= The Voice (Russian TV series) season 2 =

The Voice
- Season 2
- Presented by: Dmitry Nagiev
- Coaches: Dima Bilan; Pelageya; Alexander Gradsky; Leonid Agutin
- Winner: Sergey Volchkov
- Winning coach: Alexander Gradsky
- Runner-up: Nargiz Zakirova

Release
- Original network: Channel One
- Original release: 6 September – 27 December 2013

Season chronology
- ← Previous; Season 1 Next → Season 3

The second season of the Russian reality talent show The Voice premiered on September 6, 2013 on Channel One. Dmitry Nagiev returned as the show's presenter for his second seasons. Dima Bilan, Pelageya, Alexander Gradsky, and Leonid Agutin returned as the coach's for their second seasons.

Sergey Volchkov was announced the winner on December 27, 2013, marking Alexander Gradsky's second win as a coach, thus expanding his winning streak to two seasons in a row.

== Coaches and presenter ==
The Voice season 2 coaching panel and presenter

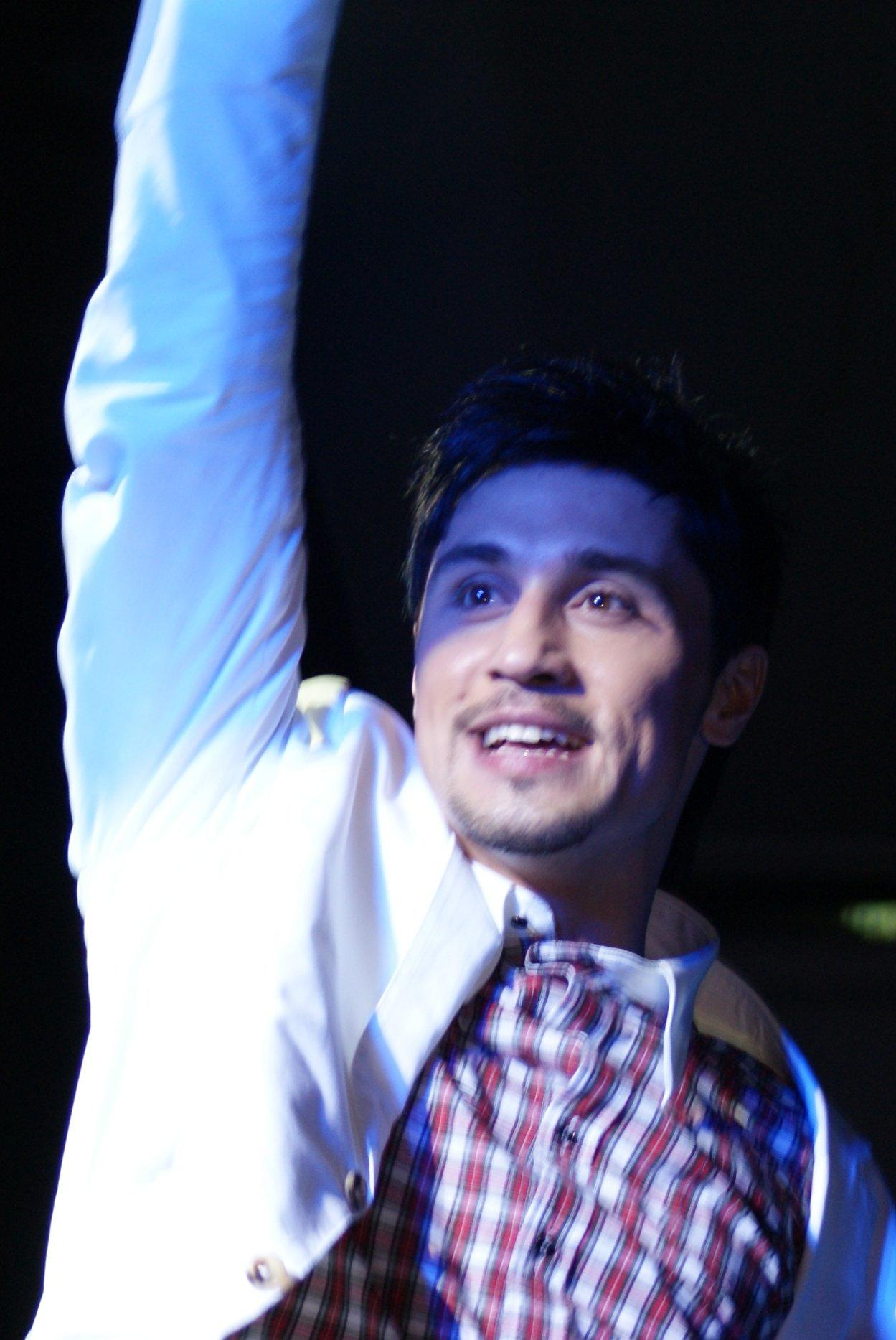
Dima Bilan

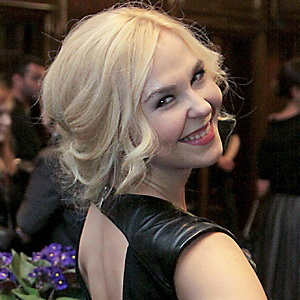
Pelageya

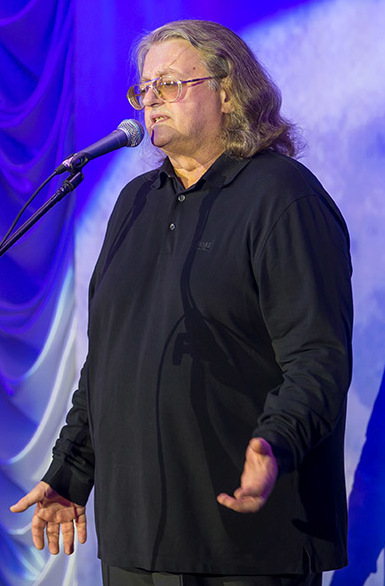
Alexander Gradsky

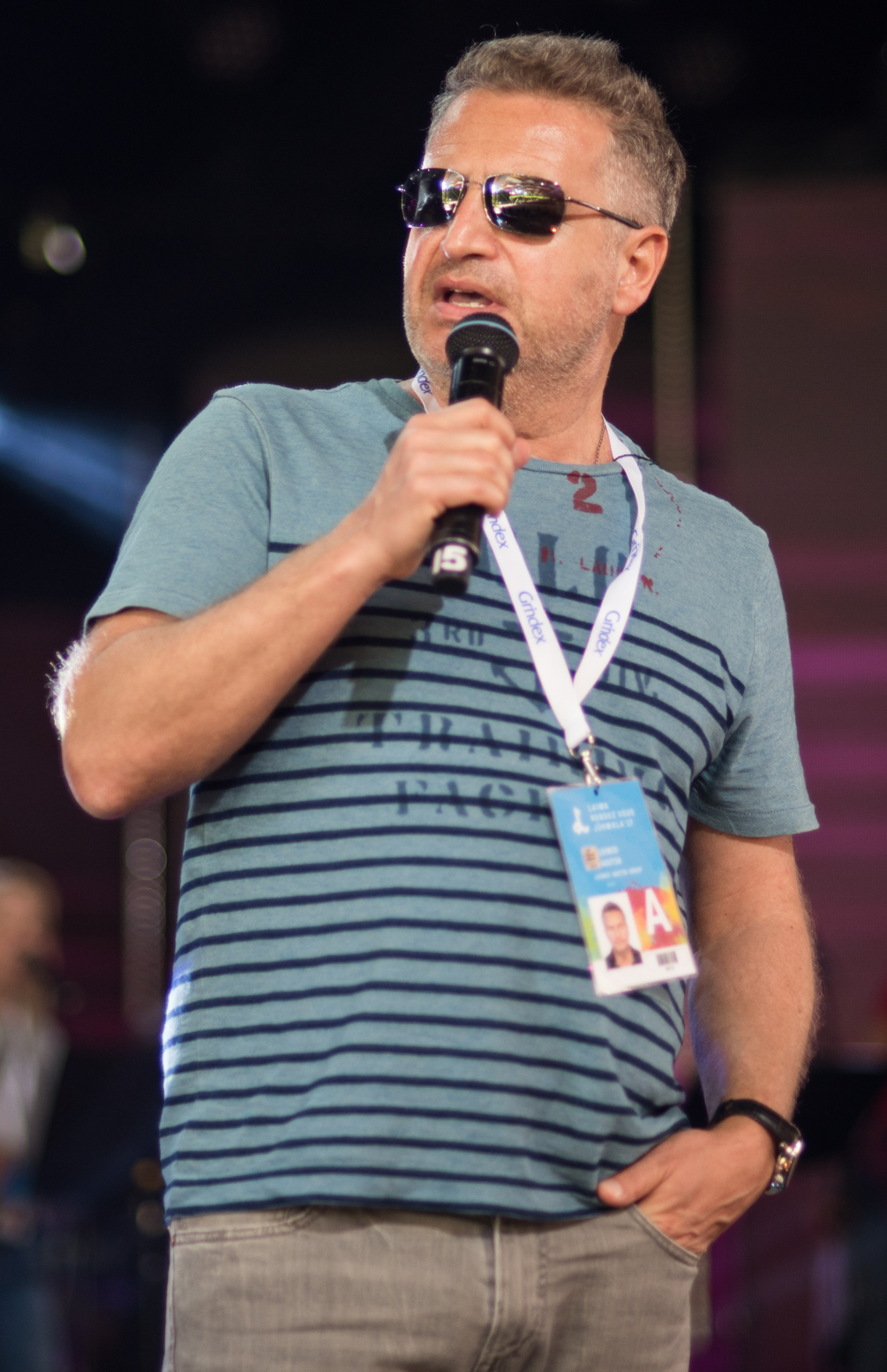
Leonid Agutin

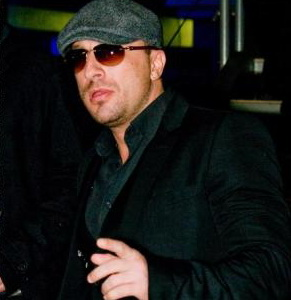
Dmitry Nagiev

Dima Bilan, Pelageya, Alexander Gradsky, and Leonid Agutin return for their second season as coaches. Dmitry Nagiev returns for his second season as a presenter.

== Teams ==
Colour key

- Winner
- Runner-up
- Third place
- Fourth place
- Eliminated in the Semifinal
- Eliminated in the Quarterfinals
- Eliminated in the Knockout rounds
- Stolen in the Battle rounds
- Eliminated in the Battles rounds

Coaches	Top 56 artists					
Dima Bilan	Gela Guralia	Andrey Tsvetkov	Yuliya Pak	Jacqueline Migal	Farid Askerov	Vadim Azarkh
Dima Bilan	Nikolay Timokhin	Olga Bragina	Valeriya Sushina	~~Polina Konkina~~	Valeriya Siltsova	Olga Sinyaeva
Dima Bilan	Viktor Balan	Mariya Stasyuk	Akhmed Shamrakh	Vitaly Makaryan		
Pelageya	Tina Kuznetsova	Anton Belyaev	Dmitry Sorochenkov	Andrey Davidyan †	Nodar Reviya	Nani Eva
Pelageya	Ivan Vabischevich	Lilit Arutyunyan	Alina Chuvashova	~~Carmen Moxie~~	~~Georgy Melikishvili~~	David Bugaev
Pelageya	Vasily Turkin	Kristina Stelmakh	Artsvik Arutyunyan	Artur Kirillov		
Alexander Gradsky	Sergey Volchkov	Sharip Umkhanov	Polina Konkina	Yana Rabinovich	Angelina Sergeeva	Alexandra Belyakova
Alexander Gradsky	Ekaterina Biserova	Svetlana Feodulova	Carmen Moxie	~~Andrey Tsvetkov~~	~~Ekaterina Kuzina~~	Yazilya Mukhametova
Alexander Gradsky	Rumiya Niyazova	Patricia Kurganova	Alexander Babenko	Aset Samrailova		
Leonid Agutin	Nargiz Zakirova	Elena Maksimova	Alena Toymintseva	Elina Chaga	Petr Elfimov	Eteri Beriashvili
Leonid Agutin	Kirill Astapov	Ekaterina Kuzina	Georgy Melikishvili	~~Nani Eva~~	~~Anton Belyaev~~	~~Farid Askerov~~
Leonid Agutin	Anna Rizman	Malika Zhalolova	Alexey Minchenko	Anna Alexandrova		
Note: Italicized names are stolen contestants (names struck through within former teams).

== Blind auditions ==
Color key

✔	Coach hit his/her "I WANT YOU" button
	Artist defaulted to this coach's team
	Artist elected to join this coach's team
	Artist eliminated with no coach pressing his or her "I WANT YOU" button

The coaches performed "Blue Suede Shoes" at the start of the show.

Episode	Order	Artist	Age	Origin	Song	Coach's and artist's choices			
Episode	Order	Artist	Age	Origin	Song	Bilan	Pelageya	Gradsky	Agutin
Episode 1 (September 6, 2013)	1	Sharip Umkhanov	32	Tolstoy-Yurt, Chechnya	"Still Loving You"	✔	✔	✔	✔
Episode 1 (September 6, 2013)	2	Angelina Sergeeva	29	Moscow	"Ты снишься мне"	—	—	✔	—
Episode 1 (September 6, 2013)	3	Maria Kirpicheva	30	Irkutsk	"New York, New York"	—	—	—	—
Episode 1 (September 6, 2013)	4	Alexandra Belyakova	23	Nizhny Novgorod	"If I Ain't Got You"	—	—	✔	✔
Episode 1 (September 6, 2013)	5	Ilya Chalov	26	Tver	"Розы"	—	—	—	—
Episode 1 (September 6, 2013)	6	Anna Alexandrova	31	Syzran, Samara Oblast	"When a Man Loves a Woman"	—	✔	✔	✔
Episode 1 (September 6, 2013)	7	Konstantin Grig	26	Volgograd	"O sole mio"	—	—	—	—
Episode 1 (September 6, 2013)	8	Viktoria Zhuk	25	Moscow	"Beggin'"	—	—	—	—
Episode 1 (September 6, 2013)	9	Anna Rizman	27	Irkutsk	"Crazy"	—	—	—	✔
Episode 1 (September 6, 2013)	10	David Bugaev	26	Vladikavkaz	"Delilah"	—	✔	—	—
Episode 1 (September 6, 2013)	11	Olesya Matakova	22	Saint Petersburg	"Снилось мне"	—	—	—	—
Episode 1 (September 6, 2013)	12	Olga Bragina	24	Berezovskiy, Sverdlovsk oblast	"Think"	✔	—	—	—
Episode 1 (September 6, 2013)	13	Ivan Vabischevich	32	Minsk, Belarus	"Мой друг лучше всех играет блюз"	—	✔	—	—
Episode 1 (September 6, 2013)	14	Yazilya Muhametova	22	Kazan	"Mei Vata Is A Appenzeller"	—	—	✔	—
Episode 2 (September 13, 2013)	1	Nodar Revia	21	Moscow	"Kiss"	✔	✔	✔	✔
Episode 2 (September 13, 2013)	2	Alena Toymintseva	21	Nizhnekamsk, Tatarstan	"Sunny"	✔	—	—	✔
Episode 2 (September 13, 2013)	3	Evgeny Plekhanov	33	Bryukhovetskaya, Krasnodar Krai	"Вдоль по Питерской"	—	—	—	—
Episode 2 (September 13, 2013)	4	Polina Konkina	25	Novosibirsk	"Run to You"	✔	—	✔	—
Episode 2 (September 13, 2013)	5	Elina Chaga	20	Kushchevskaya, Krasnodar Krai	"Mercy"	—	✔	—	✔
Episode 2 (September 13, 2013)	6	Dmitry Sorochenkov	27	Kemerovo	"На меньшее я не согласен"	—	✔	—	—
Episode 2 (September 13, 2013)	7	Viktoria Tikhonova	21	Moscow	"Помоги мне"	—	—	—	—
Episode 2 (September 13, 2013)	8	Farid Askerov	36	Baku, Azerbaijan	"Is Not She Lovely"	✔	✔	—	✔
Episode 2 (September 13, 2013)	9	Maria and Alexandra Razumnye	24/26	Obninsk	"Bother Me"	—	—	—	—
Episode 2 (September 13, 2013)	10	Yulia Pak	25	Moscow	"Listen"	✔	—	—	—
Episode 2 (September 13, 2013)	11	Igor Kamenskikh	24	Tula	"Как молоды мы были"	—	—	—	—
Episode 2 (September 13, 2013)	12	Valeria Siltsova	23	Moscow	"Nah Neh Nah"	✔	—	—	—
Episode 2 (September 13, 2013)	13	Andrea de Palma	42	Rome, Italy	"Рюмка водки"	—	—	—	—
Episode 2 (September 13, 2013)	14	Ekaterina Biserova	22	Omsk	"Mama Knows Best"	✔	✔	✔	✔
Episode 3 (September 20, 2013)	1	Olga Sinyaeva	24	Novosibirsk	"Think"	✔	—	—	✔
Episode 3 (September 20, 2013)	2	Fyodor Rytikov	50	Zelenograd	"O sole mio"	—	—	—	—
Episode 3 (September 20, 2013)	3	Alexey Minchenko	32	Bryansk	"Fly Me to the Moon"	✔	✔	✔	✔
Episode 3 (September 20, 2013)	4	Maria Kharitonova	21	Oryol	"Беловежская пуща"	—	—	—	—
Episode 3 (September 20, 2013)	5	Vasiliy Turkin	26	Istra	"New York, New York"	—	✔	—	—
Episode 3 (September 20, 2013)	6	Valeriya Sushina	17	Gubkinsky, YaNAO	"At Last"	✔	—	—	—
Episode 3 (September 20, 2013)	7	Georgy Koldun	36	Minsk, Belarus	"Снилось мне"	—	—	—	—
Episode 3 (September 20, 2013)	8	Alexandra Zaykina	26	Surgut, Yugra	"Samson and Delilah"	—	—	—	—
Episode 3 (September 20, 2013)	9	Alexander Babenko	29	Moscow	"I Believe I Can Fly"	—	—	✔	—
Episode 3 (September 20, 2013)	10	Eteri Beriashvili	41	Signagi, Georgia	"Tico, tico"	✔	✔	✔	✔
Episode 3 (September 20, 2013)	11	Vitaly Makaryan	22	Moscow	"Hello"	✔	—	—	—
Episode 3 (September 20, 2013)	12	Yana Rabinovich	31	Nyagan, Yugra	"Non, je ne regrette rien"	—	—	✔	—
Episode 3 (September 20, 2013)	13	Gela Guralia	32	Poti, Georgia	"Не отрекаются любя"	✔	—	—	—
Episode 3 (September 20, 2013)	14	Patricia Kurganova	24	Minsk, Belarus	"Run to You"	—	—	✔	—
Episode 4 (September 27, 2013)	1	Sergey Volchkov	25	Bykhov, Belarus	"Ария Мистера Икс"	✔	—	✔	—
Episode 4 (September 27, 2013)	2	Tina Kuznetsova	31	Kazan, Tatarstan	"Feeling Good"	✔	✔	✔	✔
Episode 4 (September 27, 2013)	3	Anatolie Deleu	40	Făleşti, Moldova	"Volare"	—	—	—	—
Episode 4 (September 27, 2013)	4	Lyubov Tolkunova	21	Moscow	"Боже, какой пустяк"	—	—	—	—
Episode 4 (September 27, 2013)	5	Artsvik Aryutunyan	28	Moscow	"Sunny"	—	✔	—	✔
Episode 4 (September 27, 2013)	6	Artur Kirillov	25	Nizhnekamsk, Tatarstan	"Sixteen Tons"	—	✔	—	—
Episode 4 (September 27, 2013)	7	Viktoria Mishchenko	28	Saint Petersburg	"Любовь настала"	—	—	—	—
Episode 4 (September 27, 2013)	8	Maria Stasyuk	18	Kyiv, Ukraine	"Stand Up for Love"	✔	—	—	—
Episode 4 (September 27, 2013)	9	Anton Gerasimenko	22	Mineralnye Vody, Stavropol Krai	"Влюблённый солдат"	—	—	—	—
Episode 4 (September 27, 2013)	10	Rumiya Niyazova	25	Kazan	"If I Ain't Got You"	—	—	✔	—
Episode 4 (September 27, 2013)	11	Maksim Matsyshin	22	Saratov	"Delilah"	—	—	—	—
Episode 4 (September 27, 2013)	12	Nani Eva	32	Yuzhno-Sakhalinsk	"Fly Me to the Moon"	✔	—	—	✔
Episode 4 (September 27, 2013)	13	Akhmed Shamrakh	29	Male, Maldives	"Тёмная ночь"	✔	—	—	—
Episode 4 (September 27, 2013)	14	Nargiz Zakirova	42	Tashkent, Uzbekistan	"Still Loving You"	✔	✔	✔	✔
Episode 5 (October 4, 2013)	1	Nikolay Timokhin	25	Tervolovo, Leningrad Oblast	"Как молоды мы были"	✔	✔	—	—
Episode 5 (October 4, 2013)	2	Alina Chuvashova	20	Izhevsk	"At Last"	—	✔	—	—
Episode 5 (October 4, 2013)	3	Kirill Astapov	24	Yoshkar-Ola	"Kiss"	—	✔	—	✔
Episode 5 (October 4, 2013)	4	Anneya Pashinskaya	31	Moscow	"Run to You"	—	—	—	—
Episode 5 (October 4, 2013)	5	Malika Zhalolova	21	Odesa, Ukraine	"Mercy"	✔	✔	—	✔
Episode 5 (October 4, 2013)	6	Aida Tliashinova	21	Nalchik	"It's a Man's World"	—	—	—	—
Episode 5 (October 4, 2013)	7	Grigoriy Melikishvili	35	Telavi, Georgia	"O sole mio"	—	✔	—	—
Episode 5 (October 4, 2013)	8	Anastasia Belyaeva	26	Rybinsk, Yaroslavl Oblast	"Нева"	—	—	—	—
Episode 5 (October 4, 2013)	9	Anton Belyaev	33	Magadan	"Wicked Game"	✔	✔	✔	✔
Episode 5 (October 4, 2013)	10	Lilit Arutyunyan	26	Mineralnye Vody, Stavropol Oblast	"Listen"	—	✔	—	—
Episode 5 (October 4, 2013)	11	Ekaterina Kuzina	20	Kirov	"Не отрекаются любя"	—	—	✔	—
Episode 5 (October 4, 2013)	12	Andrey Lobzhanidze	25	Prokhladny, Kabardino-Balkaria	"Проститься"	—	—	—	—
Episode 5 (October 4, 2013)	13	Svetlana Feodulova	26	Moscow	"Magic flute"	✔	—	✔	—
Episode 5 (October 4, 2013)	14	Andrey Davidyan	57	Moscow	"Georgia On My Mind"	✔	✔	✔	✔
Episode 6 (October 12, 2013)	1	Carmen Moxie	30	Los Angeles, United States	"Listen"	—	✔	—	—
Episode 6 (October 12, 2013)	2	Vadim Azarkh	39	Saint Petersburg	"Purple Rain"	✔	—	—	—
Episode 6 (October 12, 2013)	3	Elena Maksimova	34	Sevastopol, Ukraine	"Run to You"	✔	✔	✔	✔
Episode 6 (October 12, 2013)	4	Alexander Bykov	30	Krasnoyarsk	"Звон"	—	—	—	—
Episode 6 (October 12, 2013)	5	Kristina Stelmakh	23	Kaliningrad	"Mamma Knows Best"	—	✔	—	—
Episode 6 (October 12, 2013)	6	Darya Glotova	19	Cherepovets, Vologda Oblast	"Stay"	—	Team full	—	—
Episode 6 (October 12, 2013)	7	Andrey Tsvetkov	18	Moscow	"I Believe I Can Fly"	✔	Team full	✔	—
Episode 6 (October 12, 2013)	8	Aset Samrailova	31	Moscow	"If I Ain't Got You"	—	Team full	✔	—
Episode 6 (October 12, 2013)	9	Petr Elfimov	33	Minsk, Belarus	"Полетели"	—	Team full	Team full	✔
Episode 6 (October 12, 2013)	10	Jacqueline Migal	37	Moscow	"Fly Me to the Moon"	✔	Team full	Team full	Team full
Episode 6 (October 12, 2013)	11	Elena Terekhova	30	Severomorsk, Murmansk Oblast	"Stop!"	—	Team full	Team full	Team full
Episode 6 (October 12, 2013)	12	Ruslan Ivakin	25	Abakan	"Aрия Мистера Икс"	—	Team full	Team full	Team full
Episode 6 (October 12, 2013)	13	Yulia Kuusmets	27	Tallinn, Estonia	"Мой первый день без тебя"	—	Team full	Team full	Team full
Episode 6 (October 12, 2013)	14	Viktor Balan	29	Rîbnița, Moldova	"Kiss"	✔	Team full	Team full	Team full

== The Battles ==
The Battles round started with episode 7 and ended with episode 10. 'Steals' were introduced this season, where each coach could steal two contestants from another team when they lost their battle round.

Colour key:

Artist won the Battle and advanced to the Knockouts
Artist lost the Battle but was stolen by another coach and advanced to the Knockouts
Artist lost the Battle and was eliminated

Episode	Coach	Order	Winner	Song	Loser	'Steal' result			
Episode	Coach	Order	Winner	Song	Loser	Bilan	Pelageya	Gradsky	Agutin
Episode 7 (October 18, 2013)	Alexander Gradsky	1	Ekaterina Biserova	"All That Jazz"	Yazilya Mukhametova	—	—	—	—
Episode 7 (October 18, 2013)	Pelageya	2	Nodar Revia	"Туда"	Georgy Melikishvili	—	—	—	✔
Episode 7 (October 18, 2013)	Alexander Gradsky	3	Angelina Sergeeva	"Highway to Hell"	Rumiya Niyazova	—	—	—	—
Episode 7 (October 18, 2013)	Leonid Agutin	4	Petr Elfimov	"Я тебя не люблю"	Anna Rizman	—	—	—	—
Episode 7 (October 18, 2013)	Dima Bilan	5	Vadim Azarkh	"Another Day in Paradise"	Vitaly Makaryan	—	—	—	—
Episode 7 (October 18, 2013)	Pelageya	6	Alina Chuvashova	"Where the Wild Roses Grow"	David Bugaev	—	—	—	—
Episode 7 (October 18, 2013)	Dima Bilan	7	Gela Guralia	"Tell Him"	Polina Konkina	—	—	✔	—
Episode 8 (October 25, 2013)	Alexander Gradsky	1	Sharip Umkhanov	"The Prayer"	Ekaterina Kuzina	—	—	—	✔
Episode 8 (October 25, 2013)	Pelageya	2	Ivan Vabischevich	"Le Temps Des Cathedrales"	Vasily Turkin	—	—	—	Team full
Episode 8 (October 25, 2013)	Dima Bilan	3	Jacqueline Migal	"How Do You Keep the Music Playing"	Akhmed Shamrakh	—	—	—	Team full
Episode 8 (October 25, 2013)	Dima Bilan	4	Valeriya Sushina	"Пообещайте мне любовь"	Maria Stasyuk	—	—	—	Team full
Episode 8 (October 25, 2013)	Leonid Agutin	5	Elena Maksimova	"In Your Eyes"	Farid Askerov	✔	—	—	Team full
Episode 8 (October 25, 2013)	Pelageya	6	Lilit Arutyunyan	"Fighter"	Kristina Stelmakh	—	—	—	Team full
Episode 8 (October 25, 2013)	Alexander Gradsky	7	Sergey Volchkov	"Мелодия"	Patricia Kurganova	—	—	—	Team full
Episode 9 (November 1, 2013)	Leonid Agutin	1	Elina Chaga	"The Morning After"	Malika Zhalolova	—	—	—	Team full
Episode 9 (November 1, 2013)	Dima Bilan	2	Nikolay Timokhin	"Благодарю тебя"	Viktor Balan	—	—	—	Team full
Episode 9 (November 1, 2013)	Alexander Gradsky	3	Yana Rabinovich	"Вечная любовь"	Andrey Tsvetkov	✔	✔	—	Team full
Episode 9 (November 1, 2013)	Pelageya	4	Andrey Davidyan	"Never Gonna Give You Up"	Artsvik Arutyunyan	Team full	—	—	Team full
Episode 9 (November 1, 2013)	Pelageya	5	Dmitry Sorochenkov	"Солнечный остров"	Artur Kirillov	Team full	—	—	Team full
Episode 9 (November 1, 2013)	Dima Bilan	6	Yulia Pak	"Diamonds Are Forever"	Olga Sinyaeva	Team full	—	—	Team full
Episode 9 (November 1, 2013)	Leonid Agutin	7	Alena Toymintseva	"Hit the Road Jack"	Anton Belyaev	Team full	✔	—	Team full
Episode 10 (November 8, 2013)	Alexander Gradsky	1	Alexandra Belyakova	"If I Were A Boy"	Alexander Babenko	Team full	—	—	Team full
Episode 10 (November 8, 2013)	Dima Bilan	2	Olga Bragina	"Самолёты улетают"	Valeriya Siltsova	Team full	—	—	Team full
Episode 10 (November 8, 2013)	Leonid Agutin	3	Eteri Beriashvili	"Just the Two of Us"	Nani Eva	Team full	✔	—	Team full
Episode 10 (November 8, 2013)	Leonid Agutin	4	Kirill Astapov	"Снег"	Alexey Minchenko	Team full	Team full	—	Team full
Episode 10 (November 8, 2013)	Pelageya	5	Tina Kuznetsova	"Miss Celie's Blues"	Carmen Moxie	Team full	Team full	✔	Team full
Episode 10 (November 8, 2013)	Alexander Gradsky	6	Svetlana Feodulova	"Memory"	Aset Samrailova	Team full	Team full	Team full	Team full
Episode 10 (November 8, 2013)	Leonid Agutin	7	Nargiz Zakirova	"Замок из дождя"	Anna Alexandrova	Team full	Team full	Team full	Team full

== The Knockouts ==
The Knockouts round started with episode 11 and ended with episode 13.

After the Battle Round, each coach had 9 contestants for the Knockouts. The contestants were not told who they were up against until the day of the Knockout. Each contestant sang a song of their own choice, back to back, and each knockout concluded with the respective coach eliminating one of the three contestants.

The top 24 contestants will then move on to the Quarterfinal.

Colour key

Artist won the Knockout and advanced to the Quarterfinal
Artist lost the Knockout and was eliminated

Episode	Coach	Order	Song	Winners	Loser	Song
Episode 11 (November 15, 2013)	Alexander Gradsky	1	"С полуслова, с полувзгляда"	Sharip Umkhanov	Carmen Moxie	"Stay with Me Baby"
Episode 11 (November 15, 2013)	Alexander Gradsky	1	"My Yiddishe Mama"	Yana Rabinovich	Carmen Moxie	"Stay with Me Baby"
Episode 11 (November 15, 2013)	Leonid Agutin	2	"Романс"	Petr Elfimov	Georgy Melikishvili	"Mañana de Carnaval"
Episode 11 (November 15, 2013)	Leonid Agutin	2	"Карточный домик"	Eteri Beriashvili	Georgy Melikishvili	"Mañana de Carnaval"
Episode 11 (November 15, 2013)	Pelageya	3	"Crazy"	Dmitry Sorochenkov	Alina Chuvashova	"Nothing Compares to You"
Episode 11 (November 15, 2013)	Pelageya	3	"Верни мне музыку"	Nodar Reviya	Alina Chuvashova	"Nothing Compares to You"
Episode 11 (November 15, 2013)	Dima Bilan	4	"Сто часов счастья"	Jacqueline Migal	Valeriya Sushina	"Nobody's Perfect"
Episode 11 (November 15, 2013)	Dima Bilan	4	"I Knew I Loved You"	Gela Guralia	Valeriya Sushina	"Nobody's Perfect"
Episode 12 (November 22, 2013)	Pelageya	1	"Bésame Mucho"	Nani Eva	Lilit Arutyunyan	"Fallin'"
Episode 12 (November 22, 2013)	Pelageya	1	"Ты вернёшься когда-нибудь снова"	Anton Belyaev	Lilit Arutyunyan	"Fallin'"
Episode 12 (November 22, 2013)	Dima Bilan	2	"Любовь, похожая на сон"	Farid Askerov	Olga Bragina	"You Make Me Feel"
Episode 12 (November 22, 2013)	Dima Bilan	2	"They Won't Go When I Go"	Andrey Tsvetkov	Olga Bragina	"You Make Me Feel"
Episode 12 (November 22, 2013)	Alexander Gradsky	3	"Нищая"	Polina Konkina	Svetlana Feodulova	"Les Oiseaux Dans La Charmille"
Episode 12 (November 22, 2013)	Alexander Gradsky	3	"Я люблю тебя, жизнь"	Sergey Volchkov	Svetlana Feodulova	"Les Oiseaux Dans La Charmille"
Episode 12 (November 22, 2013)	Leonid Agutin	4	"Женщина, которая поёт"	Nargiz Zakirova	Ekaterina Kuzina	"I Will Always Love You"
Episode 12 (November 22, 2013)	Leonid Agutin	4	"My Heart Will Go On"	Elena Maksimova	Ekaterina Kuzina	"I Will Always Love You"
Episode 13 (November 29, 2013)	Leonid Agutin	1	"History Repeating"	Elina Chaga	Kirill Astapov	"Superstition"
Episode 13 (November 29, 2013)	Leonid Agutin	1	"День погас"	Alena Toymintseva	Kirill Astapov	"Superstition"
Episode 13 (November 29, 2013)	Dima Bilan	2	"Молитва"	Yulia Pak	Nikolay Timokhin	"Una furtiva lagrima"
Episode 13 (November 29, 2013)	Dima Bilan	2	"Apologize"	Vadim Azarkh	Nikolay Timokhin	"Una furtiva lagrima"
Episode 13 (November 29, 2013)	Alexander Gradsky	3	"Lullaby"	Angelina Sergeeva	Ekaterina Biserova	"Contigo en la distancia"
Episode 13 (November 29, 2013)	Alexander Gradsky	3	"All The Man That I Need"	Alexandra Belyakova	Ekaterina Biserova	"Contigo en la distancia"
Episode 13 (November 29, 2013)	Pelageya	4	"Ваня"	Tina Kuznetsova	Ivan Vabischevich	"Я остаюсь"
Episode 13 (November 29, 2013)	Pelageya	4	"What a Wonderful World"	Andrey Davidyan	Ivan Vabischevich	"Я остаюсь"

== Live shows ==
Colour key:

Artist was saved
Artist was eliminated

=== Week 1, 2: Quarterfinals ===
The Quarterfinals started with episode 14 and ended with episode 15. The two artists with the fewest votes from the each team left the competition by the end of the each episode.

Episode	Coach	Order	Artist	Song	Coach's vote (/100%)	Public's vote (/100%)	Votes' sum	Result
Episode 14 (December 6, 2013)	Alexander Gradsky	1	Angelina Sergeeva	"Padam... Padam..."	30%	8.5%	38.5%	Eliminated
Episode 14 (December 6, 2013)	Alexander Gradsky	2	Yana Rabinovich	"Течёт река Волга"	20%	21.2%	41.2%	Eliminated
Episode 14 (December 6, 2013)	Alexander Gradsky	3	Sergey Volchkov	"Passione"	50%	70.3%	120.3%	Advanced
Episode 14 (December 6, 2013)	Pelageya	4	Tina Kuznetsova	"Ай вы, цыгане"	50%	60.1%	110.1%	Advanced
Episode 14 (December 6, 2013)	Pelageya	5	Nodar Revia	"This Love"	30%	13.6%	43.6%	Eliminated
Episode 14 (December 6, 2013)	Pelageya	6	Andrey Davidyan	"Куда ты, туда и я"	20%	26.3%	46.3%	Eliminated
Episode 14 (December 6, 2013)	Dima Bilan	7	Vadim Azarkh	"Выхода нет"	20%	9.4%	29.4%	Eliminated
Episode 14 (December 6, 2013)	Dima Bilan	8	Yulia Pak	"Fairy World"	30%	20.5%	50.5%	Eliminated
Episode 14 (December 6, 2013)	Dima Bilan	9	Andrey Tsvetkov	"Звезда"	50%	70.1%	120.1%	Advanced
Episode 14 (December 6, 2013)	Leonid Agutin	10	Petr Elfimov	"I Don't Want to Miss a Thing"	20%	15.5%	35.5%	Eliminated
Episode 14 (December 6, 2013)	Leonid Agutin	11	Elina Chaga	"О нём"	30%	19.5%	49.5%	Eliminated
Episode 14 (December 6, 2013)	Leonid Agutin	12	Nargiz Zakirova	"Smells Like Teen Spirit"	50%	65%	115%	Advanced
Episode 15 (December 13, 2013)	Leonid Agutin	1	Eteri Beriashvili	"Дорогие мои москвичи"	20%	3.2%	23.2%	Eliminated
Episode 15 (December 13, 2013)	Leonid Agutin	2	Alena Toymintseva	"Cosmic Girl"	50%	19%	69%	Eliminated
Episode 15 (December 13, 2013)	Leonid Agutin	3	Elena Maksimova	"Je suis Malade"	30%	77.8%	107.8%	Advanced
Episode 15 (December 13, 2013)	Pelageya	4	Anton Belyaev	"No Woman, No Cry"	50%	48.5%	98.5%	Advanced
Episode 15 (December 13, 2013)	Pelageya	5	Nani Eva	"Ау"	20%	9.1%	29.1%	Eliminated
Episode 15 (December 13, 2013)	Pelageya	6	Dmitry Sorochenkov	"Бывший подъесаул"	30%	42.4%	72.4%	Eliminated
Episode 15 (December 13, 2013)	Dima Bilan	7	Jacqueline Migal	"I've Seen That Face Before"	30%	7.6%	37.6%	Eliminated
Episode 15 (December 13, 2013)	Dima Bilan	8	Farid Askerov	"Не спеши"	20%	14.7%	34.7%	Eliminated
Episode 15 (December 13, 2013)	Dima Bilan	9	Gela Guralia	"Earth Song"	50%	77.7%	127.7%	Advanced
Episode 15 (December 13, 2013)	Alexander Gradsky	10	Alexandra Belyakova	"Журавли"	20%	12%	32%	Eliminated
Episode 15 (December 13, 2013)	Alexander Gradsky	11	Sharip Umkhanov	"Maybe I, Maybe You"	50%	59.4%	109.4%	Advanced
Episode 15 (December 13, 2013)	Alexander Gradsky	12	Polina Konkina	"Молитва"	30%	28.8%	58.8%	Eliminated

=== Week 3: Semifinal ===
The one artist with the fewest votes from the each team left the competition.

Episode	Coach	Order	Artist	Song	Coach's vote (/100%)	Public's vote (/100%)	Votes' sum	Result
Episode 16 (December 20, 2013)	Alexander Gradsky	1	Sergey Volchkov	"Синяя вечность"	40%	62.3%	102.3%	Advanced
Episode 16 (December 20, 2013)	Alexander Gradsky	2	Sharip Umkhanov	"Miserere"	60%	37.7%	97.7%	Eliminated
Episode 16 (December 20, 2013)	Pelageya	3	Tina Kuznetsova	"Небо Лондона"	60%	46.3%	106.3%	Advanced
Episode 16 (December 20, 2013)	Pelageya	4	Anton Belyaev	"Shape of My Heart"	40%	53.7%	93.7%	Eliminated
Episode 16 (December 20, 2013)	Dima Bilan	5	Andrey Tsvetkov	"Heal the World"	60%	37%	97%	Eliminated
Episode 16 (December 20, 2013)	Dima Bilan	6	Gela Guralia	"Путь"	40%	63%	103%	Advanced
Episode 16 (December 20, 2013)	Leonid Agutin	7	Elena Maksimova	"Back in the U.S.S.R."	40%	44.9%	84.9%	Eliminated
Episode 16 (December 20, 2013)	Leonid Agutin	8	Nargiz Zakirova	"Когда я уйду"	60%	55.1%	115.1%	Advanced

Non-competition performances
Order	Performer	Song
16.1	Dina Garipova, Sergey Volchkov, and Sharip Umkhanov	"Подберу музыку"
16.2	Vladimir Presnyakov, Tina Kuznetsova, and Anton Belyaev	"Птица"
16.3	Alsou, Andrey Tsvetkov, and Gela Guralia	"The Whole New World"
16.4	Inna Zhelannaya, Elena Maksimova, and Nargiz Zakirova	"Иван"

=== Week 4: Final ===
The Top 4 performed on December 27, 2013. This week, the four finalists performed two solo cover songs and a duet with their coach.

Episode	Coach	Artist	Order	Duet Song (with Coach)	Order	Solo Song (no.1)	Order	Solo Song (no.2)	Result	
Episode 17 (December 27, 2013)
Episode 17 (December 27, 2013)	Dima Bilan	Gela Guralia	1	"The Way We Were"	5	"Я тебя никогда не забуду"	9	"Papa, Can You Hear Me?"	Third place	
Episode 17 (December 27, 2013)	Pelageya	Tina Kuznetsova	2	"Now We Are Free"	6	"Монолог"	Eliminated		Fourth place	
Episode 17 (December 27, 2013)	Alexander Gradsky	Sergey Volchkov	3	"Мiсяць на небi"	7	"Ария Мистера Икс"	10	"Tu, Ca Nun Chiagne"	Winner	75%
Episode 17 (December 27, 2013)	Leonid Agutin	Nargiz Zakirova	4	"Если ты когда-нибудь меня простишь"	8	"Калитка"	11	"The Show Must Go On"	Second place	25%

Non-competition performances
Order	Performer	Song
17.1	Gela Guralia, Tina Kuznetsova, Sergey Volchkov, and Nargiz Zakirova	"White Dove"
17.2	Tina Kuznetsova	"Стороною дождь" / "Try"
17.3	Sergey Volchkov (winner)	"Tu, Ca Nun Chiagne"
17.4	Top 56 artists of the 2nd season	"Last Christmas"

== Reception ==
=== Rating ===
Episode		Original airdate	Production	Time slot (UTC+3)	Audience	
Episode		Original airdate	Production	Time slot (UTC+3)	Rating	Share
1	"The Blind Auditions Premiere"	September 6, 2013	201	Friday 9:30 p.m.	9.5	31.2
2	"The Blind Auditions, Part 2"	September 13, 2013	202	Friday 9:30 p.m.	8.6	28.4
3	"The Blind Auditions, Part 3"	September 20, 2013	203	Friday 9:30 p.m.	8.9	28.7
4	"The Blind Auditions, Part 4"	September 27, 2013	204	Friday 9:30 p.m.	9.4	28.5
5	"The Blind Auditions, Part 5"	October 4, 2013	205	Friday 9:30 p.m.	9.5	28.4
6	"The Blind Auditions, Part 6"	October 12, 2013	206	Saturday 9:20 p.m.	10.0	29.5
7	"The Battles Premiere"	October 18, 2013	207	Friday 9:30 p.m.	9.4	27.3
8	"The Battles, Part 2"	October 25, 2013	208	Friday 9:30 p.m.	9.1	26.5
9	"The Battles, Part 3"	November 1, 2013	209	Friday 9:30 p.m.	9.1	27.0
10	"The Battles, Part 4"	November 8, 2013	210	Friday 9:30 p.m.	8.3	23.1
11	"The Knockouts Premiere"	November 15, 2013	211	Friday 9:30 p.m.	9.4	27.9
12	"The Knockouts, Part 2"	November 22, 2013	212	Friday 9:30 p.m.	9.0	25.2
13	"The Knockouts, Part 3"	November 29, 2013	213	Friday 9:30 p.m.	8.5	24.4
14	"Live Quarterfinals Premiere"	December 6, 2013	214	Friday 9:30 p.m.	9.1	27.0
15	"Live Quarterfinals, Part 2"	December 13, 2013	215	Friday 9:30 p.m.	9.2	27.3
16	"Live Semifinal"	December 20, 2013	216	Friday 9:30 p.m.	9.5	27.8
17	"Live Season Final"	December 27, 2013	217	Friday 9:30 p.m.	9.8	29.2
