= The Voice (Russian TV series) =

TV series or program

- Russian: Голос
- Genre: Music program
- Created by: John de Mol Jr. Roel van Velzen
- Developed by: Talpa Content
- Directed by: Ildous Kurmaleev; Andrey Sychev
- Presented by: Dmitry Nagiyev, Yana Churikova
- Judges: Dima Bilan; Pelageya; Alexander Gradsky^{†}; Leonid Agutin; Basta; Polina Gagarina; Grigory Leps; Ani Lorak; Sergey Shnurov; Konstantin Meladze; Valeriy Syutkin; Vladimir Presnyakov; Anton Belyaev; Zivert; Hibla Gerzmava; Ildar Abdrazakov; ANNA ASTI
- Opening theme: This Is The Voice
- Country of origin: Russia
- Original language: Russian
- No. of seasons: 14
- No. of episodes: 208

Production
- Producers: Yury Aksyuta; Evgeniy Orlov; Andrey Sergeev; Larisa Sinelschikova (2012–2014); Ilya Krivitsky (2012–2014)
- Production locations: Moscow, Liza Chaykina's St.1 (2012–2016); Moscow, Mosfilm (2017—)
- Camera setup: Multi-camera
- Running time: 120–150 minutes
- Production companies: Channel One (2015–); Krasny Kvadrat (2012–2014); Talpa Productions (2012–2019); ITV Studios (2020–present)

Original release
- Network: Channel One
- Release: October 5, 2012 – present

Related
- The Voice Kids; The Voice Senior; The Voice (franchise)

The Voice (Russian: Голос) is a Russian singing competition television series broadcast on Channel One. Based on the original The Voice of Holland, it has aired eight seasons and aims to find currently unsigned singing talent (solo or duets, professional and amateur). The competition is contested by aspiring singers, age 17 or over, drawn from public auditions. The winner is determined by television viewers voting by telephone, SMS text, and The Voice App.

The winners of the fourteen seasons have been: Dina Garipova, Sergey Volchkov, Alexandra Vorobyova, Hieromonk Fotiy, Darya Antonyuk, Selim Alakhyarov, Petr Zakharov, Asker Berbekov, Yana Gabbasova, Alexander Volkodav, Viktoria Solomakhina, Bogdan Shuvalov, David Sanikidze, and Elmira Karakhanova.

The series employs a panel of four coaches who critique the artists' performances and guide their teams of selected artists through the remainder of the season. They also compete to ensure that their act wins the competition, thus making them the winning coach. The original panel featured Dima Bilan (seasons 1–3, 5–6, 10), Pelageya (seasons 1–3, 6, 10, 14-), Alexander Gradsky (seasons 1–4, 6, 10), and Leonid Agutin (seasons 1–3, 5–6, 10). The coaching panel for the most recent fourteen season featured Vladimir Presnyakov (seasons 11–12, 14-), Pelageya (seasons 1–3, 6, 10, 14-), Ildar Abdrazakov (14-) and ANNA ASTI (season 14-). Other coaches from previous seasons include Grigory Leps (seasons 4–5), Ani Lorak (season 7), Konstantin Meladze (seasons 7–8), Sergey Shnurov (seasons 7–9), Valeriy Syutkin (seasons 8–9), Zivert (season 12), Basta (seasons 4, 7, 9, 11, 13–), Polina Gagarina (seasons 4–5, 8–9, 11–), Anton Belyaev (seasons 11–13) and Hibla Gerzmava (season 13).

The Voice began airing on October 5, 2012, as an autumn-winter TV season program. The show proved to be a hit for Channel One. So far, the series has aired for fourteen seasons.

== Conception ==
An adaptation of the Dutch show The Voice of Holland, Channel One announced the show under the name Голос (The Voice).

In each season, the winner receives ₽1,000,000 (approx. USD 16,000) and a record deal with Universal Music Group.

== Selection process and format ==
Blind auditions

Each season begins with the "Blind Auditions," where coaches form their team of artists (12 artists in season 1 and since season 7, 14 artists in seasons 2–6) whom they mentor through the remainder of the season. (There was a rule in seasons 3–5 that coach who complete his/her team firstly can add to his/her team still one artist). The coaches' chairs are faced towards the audience during artists' performances; those interested in an artist press their button, which turns their chair towards the artist and illuminates the bottom of the chair to read "Я выбираю тебя" ("I Want You"). At the conclusion of the performance, an artist either defaults to the only coach who turned around or selects his or her coach if more than one coach expresses interest. Eleventh season features block button which will prevent a coach from being chosen by the contestant.

Battles

In the "Battle Rounds," each coach pairs two of his or her team members to perform together, then chooses one to advance in the competition. In season 1, coaches were assisted by celebrity mentors. In the first season, coaches sit alongside their respective advisors in the battle stage. A new element was added in season two; coaches were given two "steals", allowing each coach to select two individuals who were eliminated during a battle round by another coach. However, since the seventh season (just like in the first season) each coach can't steal artists.

Knockouts

In the Knockout Rounds, a pair of artists within a team are selected to sing individual performances in succession. They are not told until a few minutes prior to their performances who their partner is. At the conclusion of the performances, coaches would decide which one of each pair gets to advance to the next round. Starting with season two each coach pairs three artists into one knockout with two contestants from the trio advance to the next round. However, since season 7 only one contestant from the trio advances to the Top 12. But the coaches were given one "steal" (just like in the previous seasons' Battles).

Live shows

In the final live performance phase of the competition, artists perform in weekly shows, where public voting and coaches' decision s narrow to a final group of artists and eventually declares a winner. In season one the coaches have the power to save one artist that had not received the public's vote in the Quarterfinal. In later seasons artists were saved by Votes' summa (Public's vote + Coach's vote). In deciding who moves on to the final four phase, the television audience and the coaches have equal say. With one team member remaining for each coach, the contestants compete against each other in the finale, where the outcome is decided solely by public vote. One contestant from each team would advance to the final four.

Addition

Since season 7, alongside the determining of the winner, television viewers vote for the Best coach using The Voice App and HbbTV option in their TV sets.

== Coaches and presenter ==
=== Coaches timeline ===
Timeline of coaches
Coach	Seasons													
Coach	1	2	3	4	5	6	7	8	9	10	11	12	13	14
Dima Bilan														
Pelageya														
Alexander Gradsky †														
Leonid Agutin														
Basta														
Polina Gagarina														
Grigory Leps														
Ani Lorak														
Sergey Shnurov														
Konstantin Meladze														
Valeriy Syutkin														
Vladimir Presnyakov														
Anton Belyaev														
Zivert														
Hibla Gerzmava														
Ildar Abdrazakov														
ANNA ASTI														

Coaches gallery

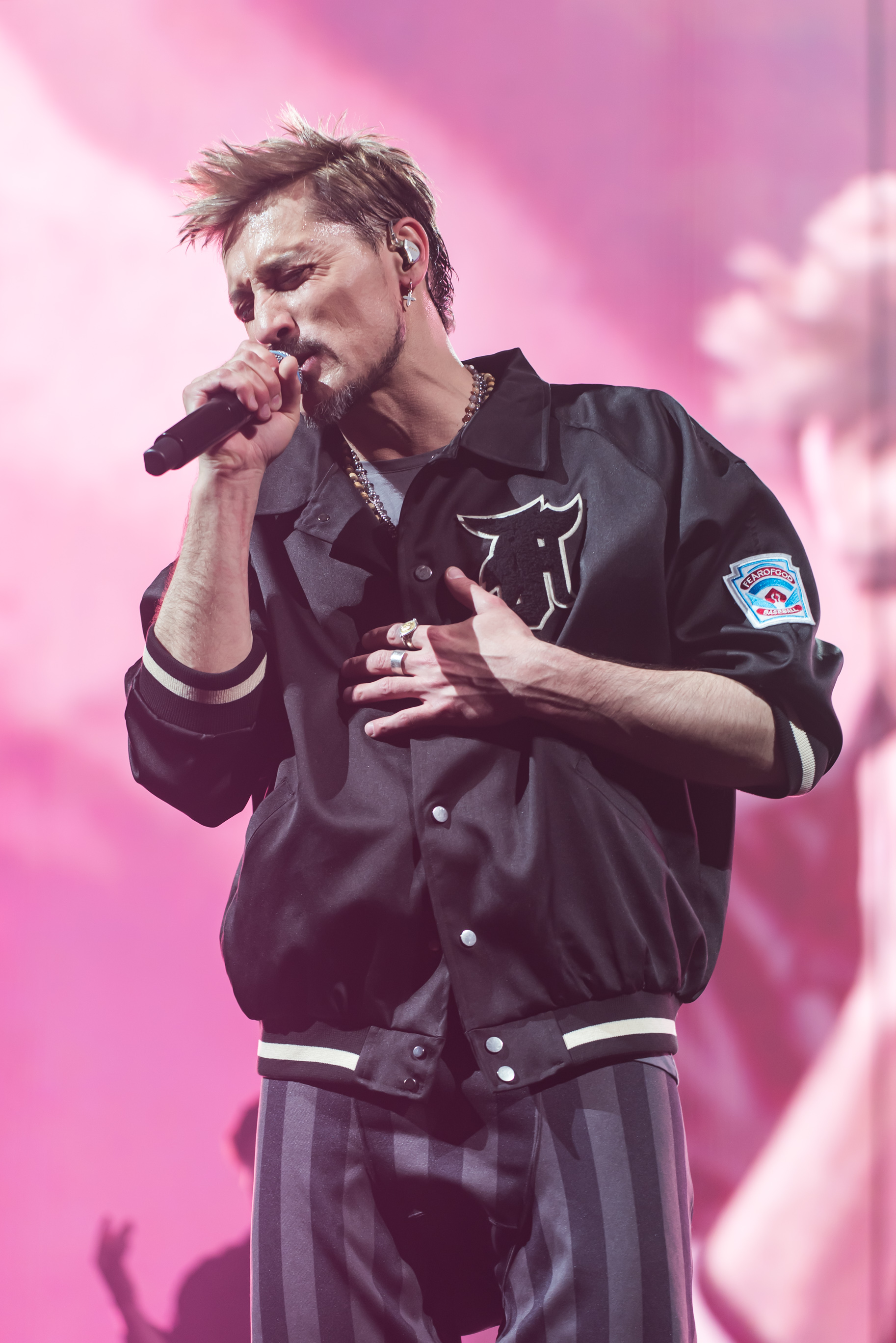
Dima Bilan
(1-3 5-6, 10)

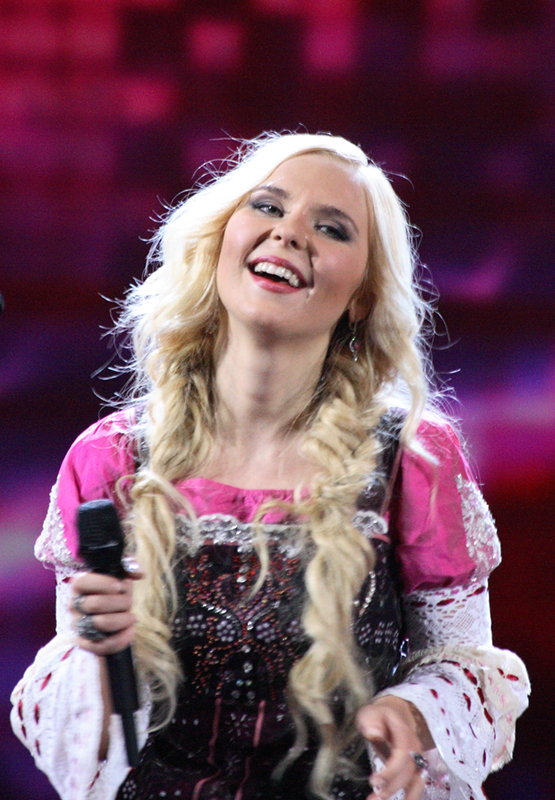
Pelageya
(1-3, 6, 10, 14-)

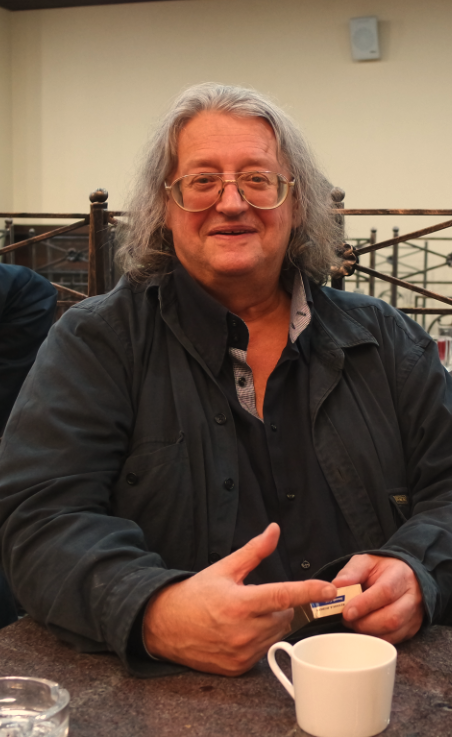
Alexander Gradsky†
(1-4, 6, 10)

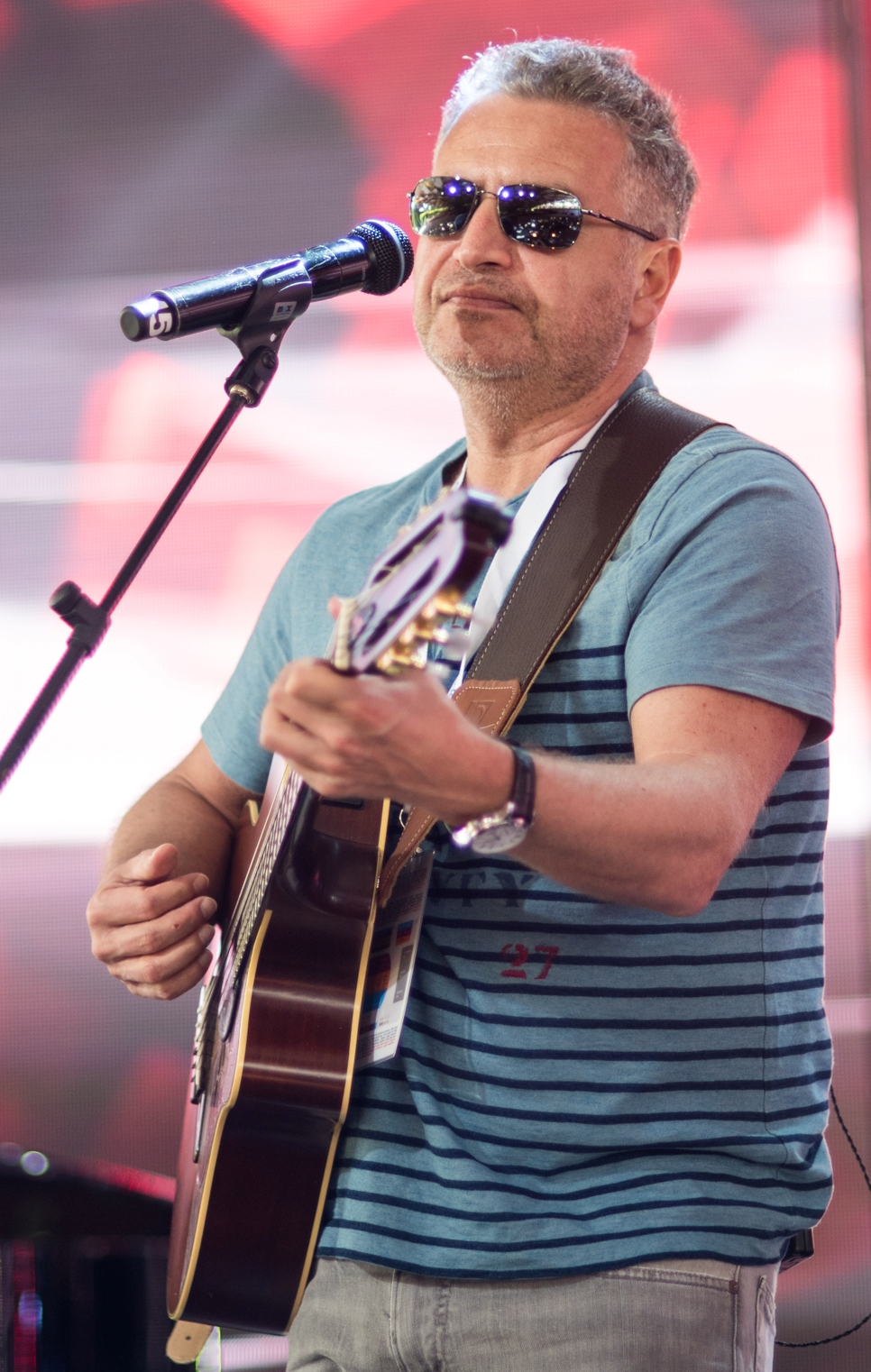
Leonid Agutin (1-3, 5-6, 10)

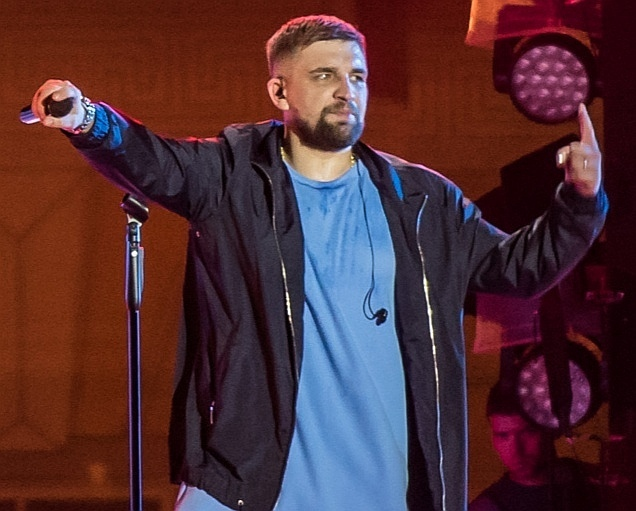
Basta
(4, 7, 9, 11, 13)

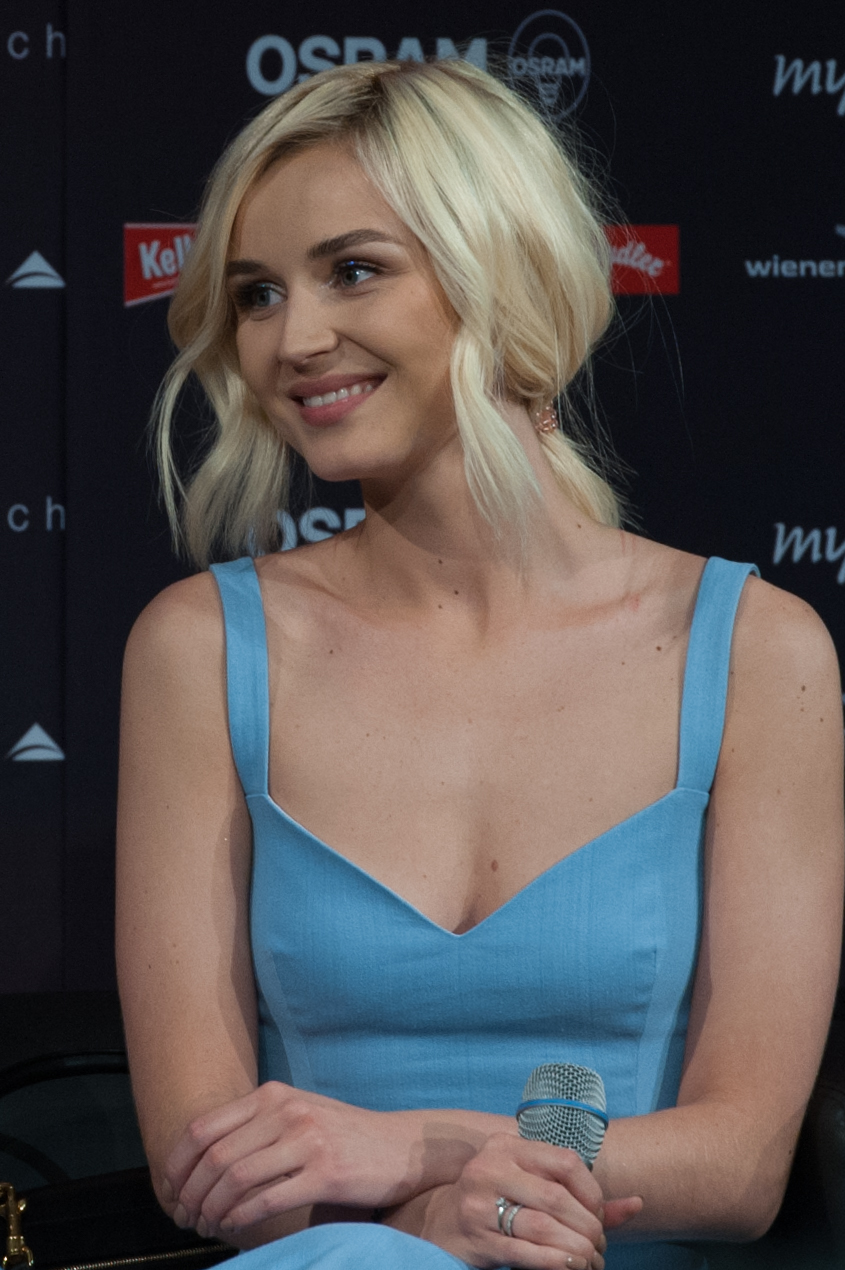
Polina Gagarina
(4-5, 8-9, 11-13)

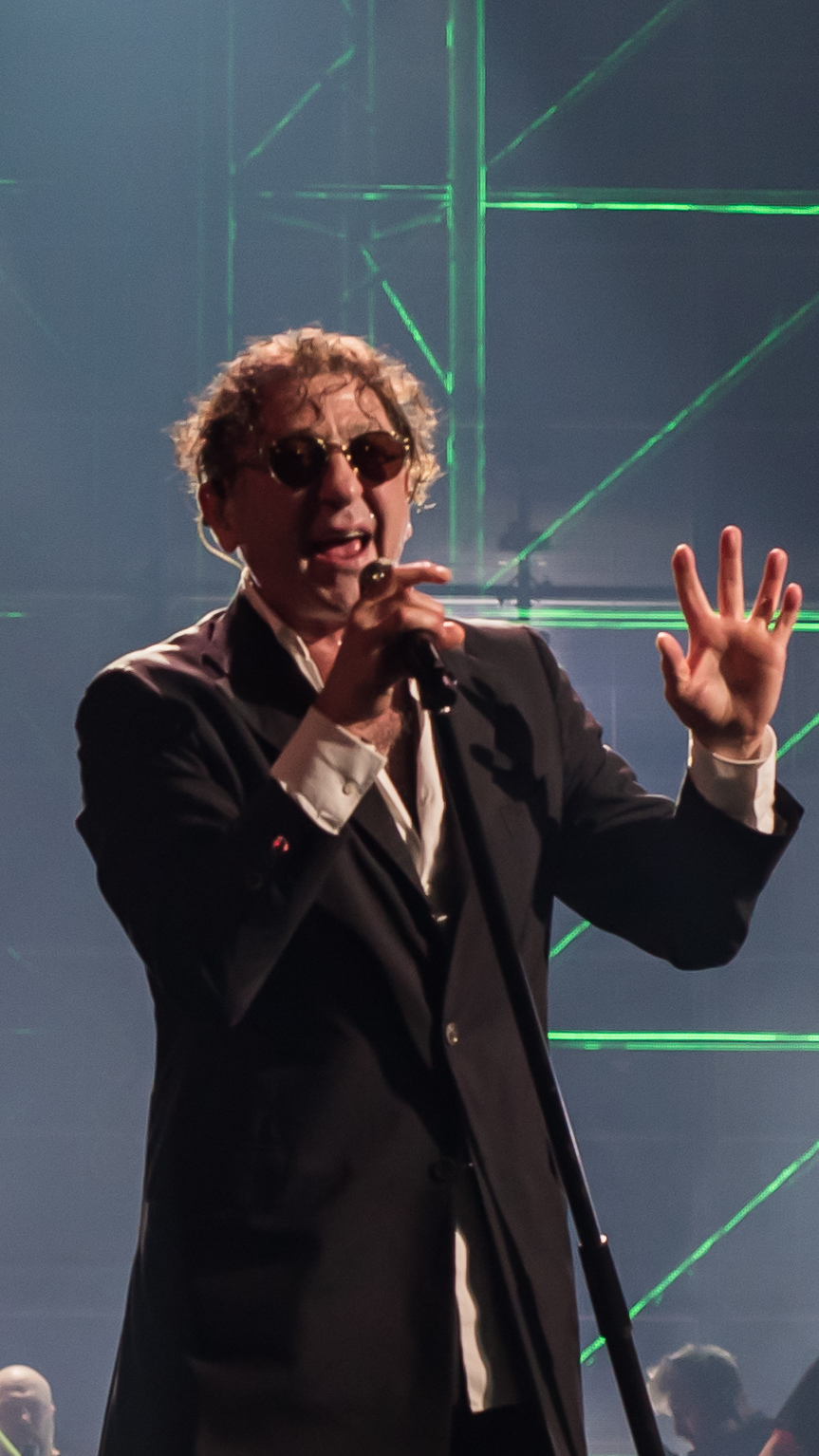
Grigory Leps (4-5)

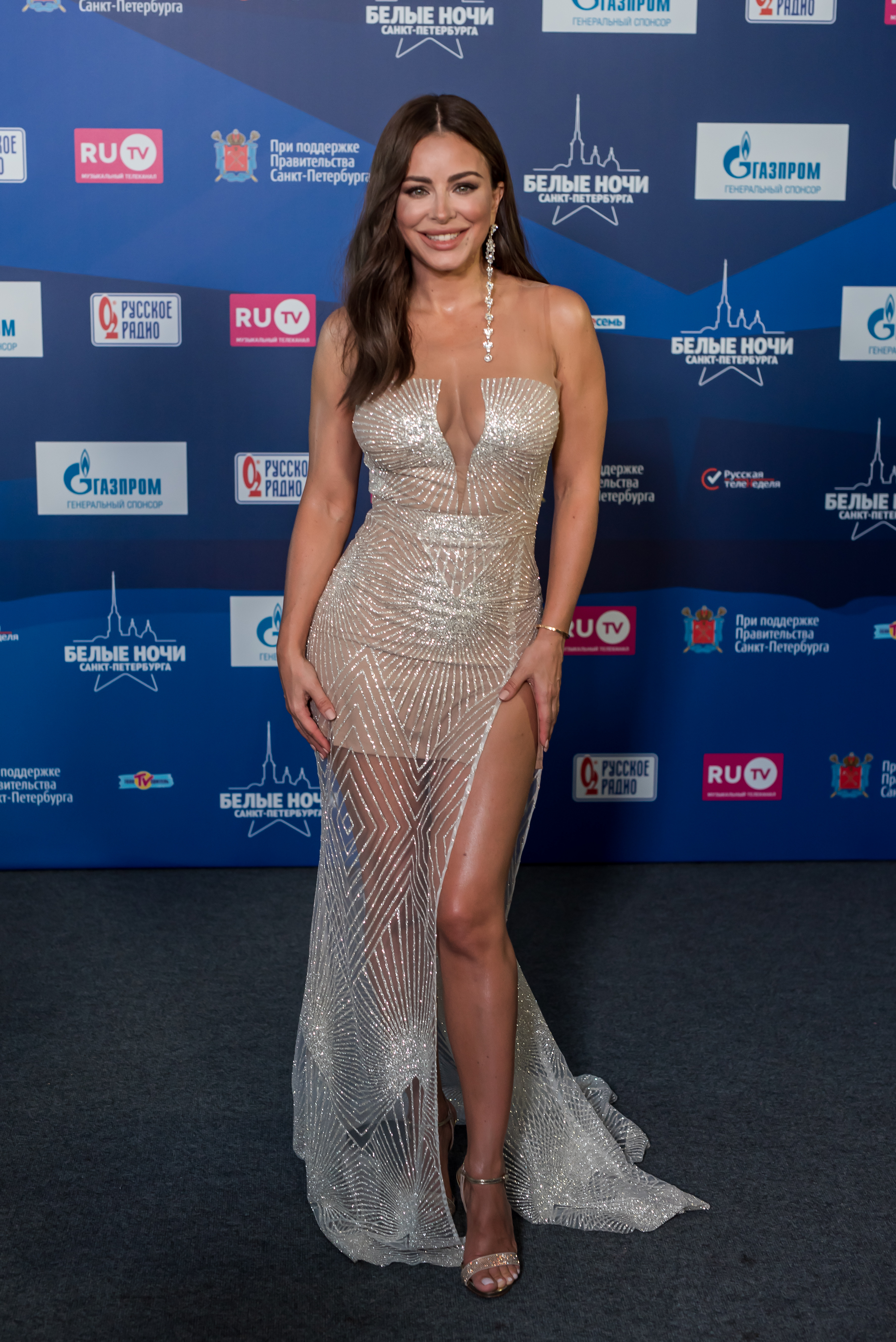
Ani Lorak (7)

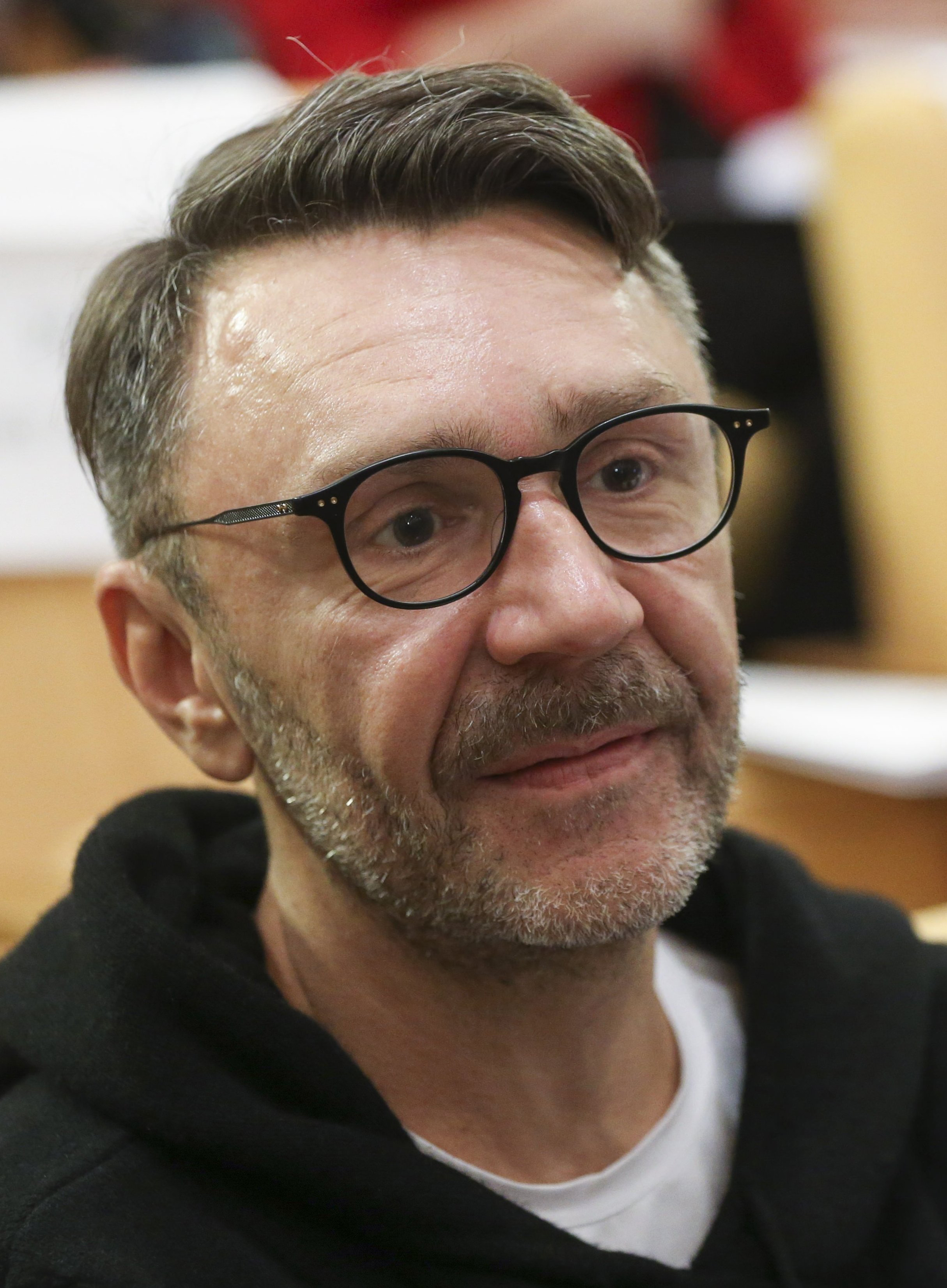
Sergey Shnurov (7-9)

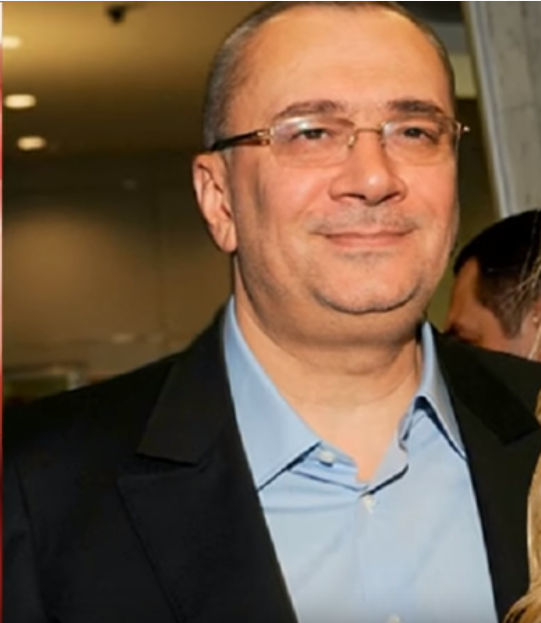
Konstantin Meladze (7-8)

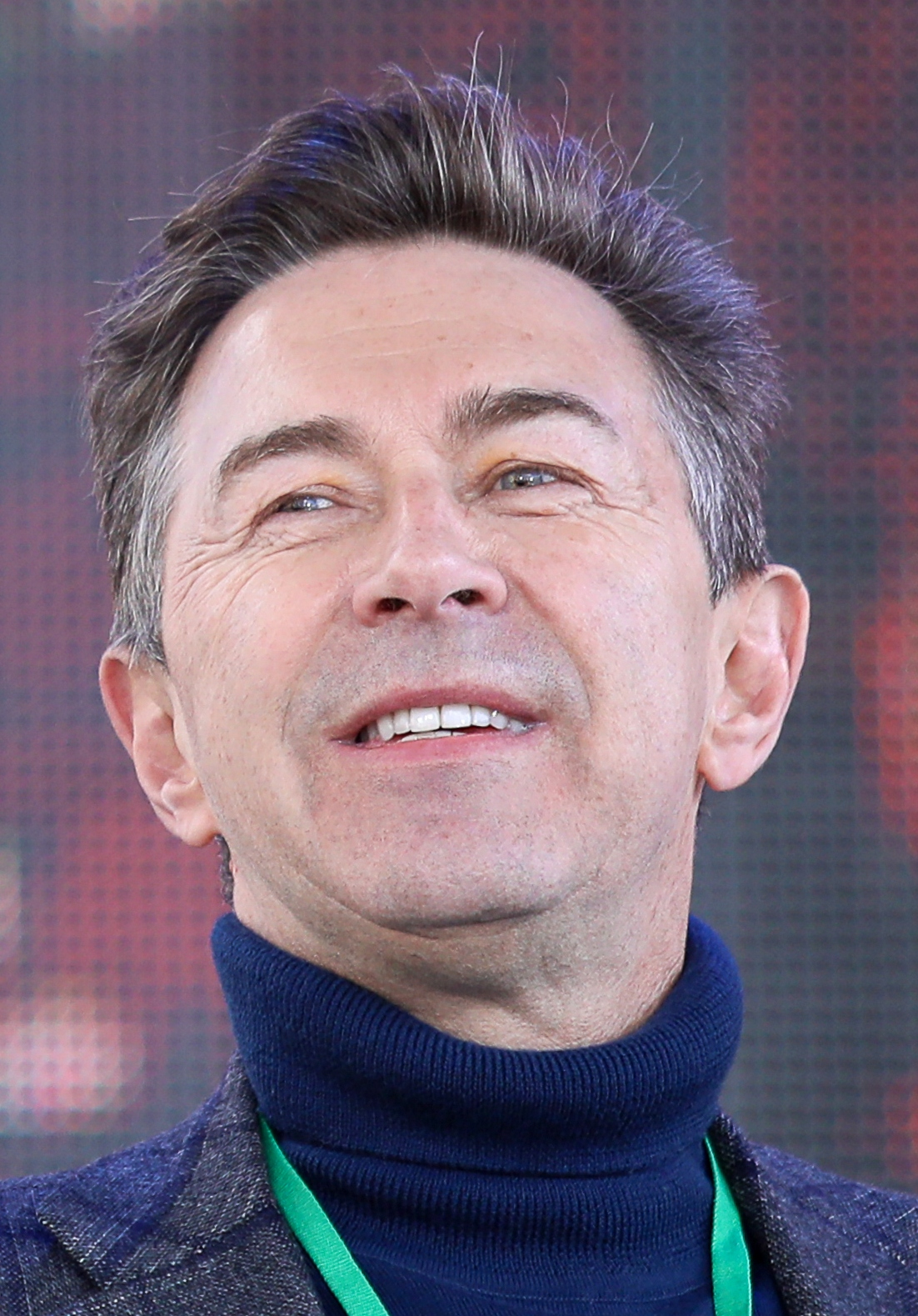
Valeriy Syutkin (8-9)

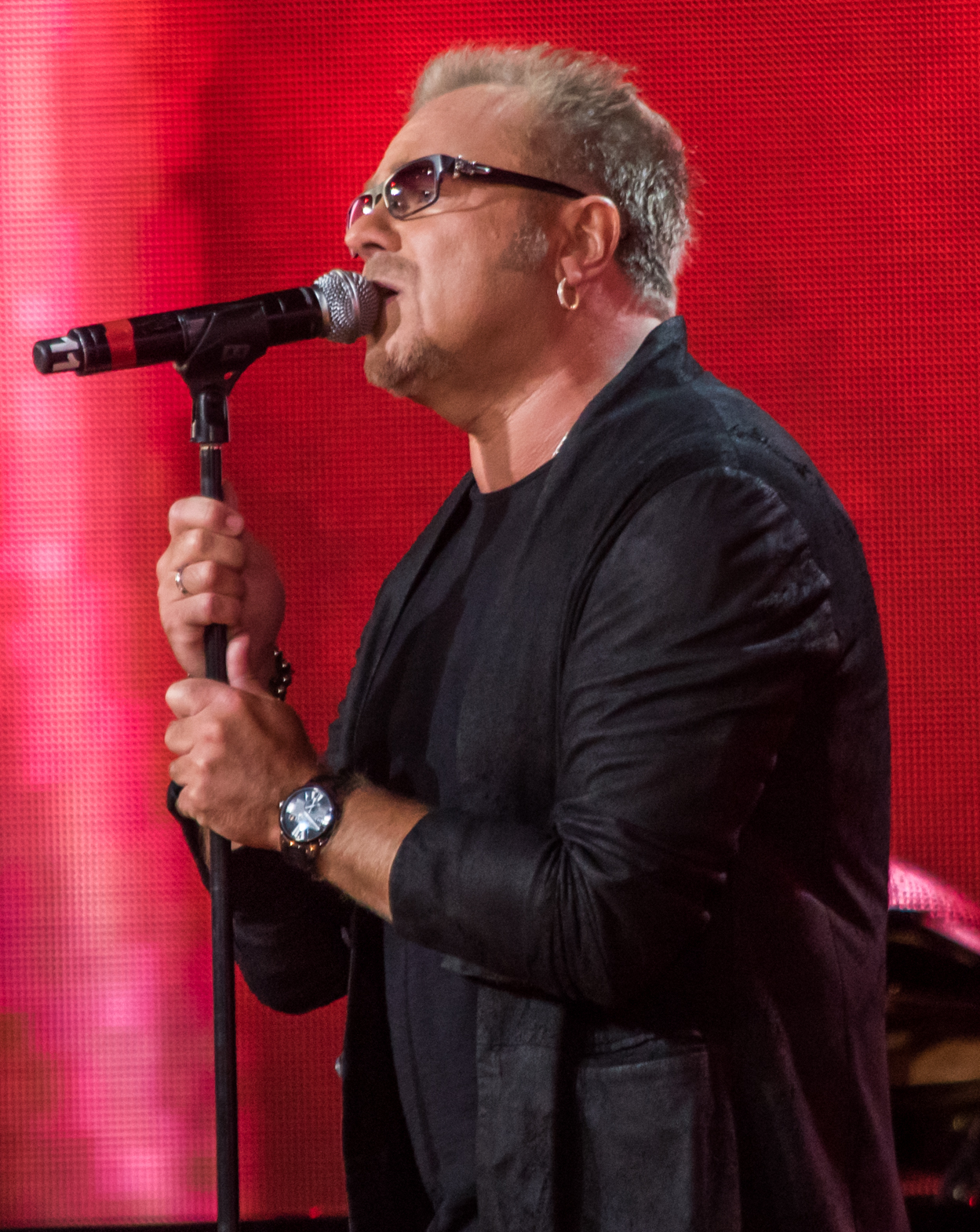
Vladimir Presnyakov (11-12, 14-)

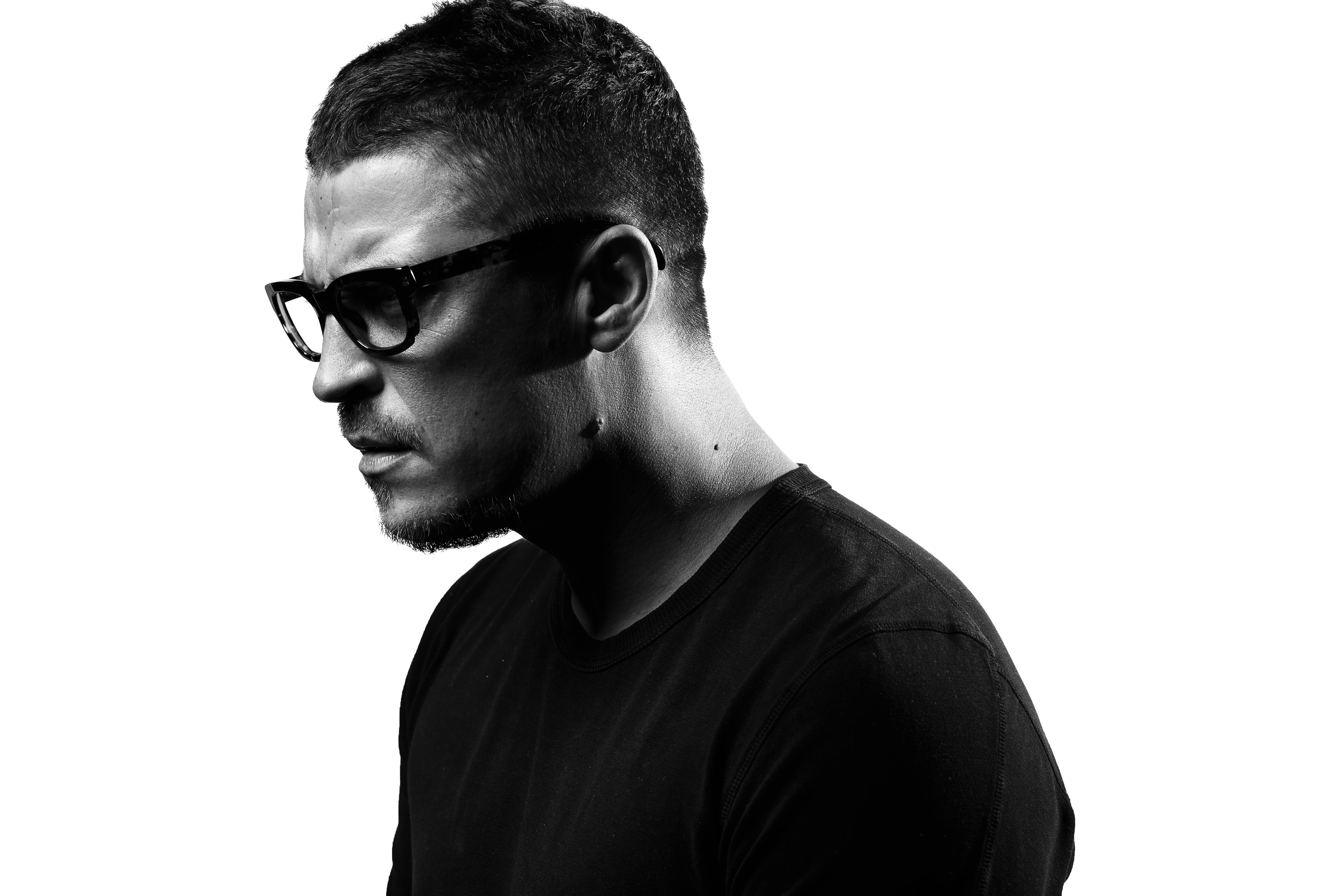
Anton Belyaev (11-13)

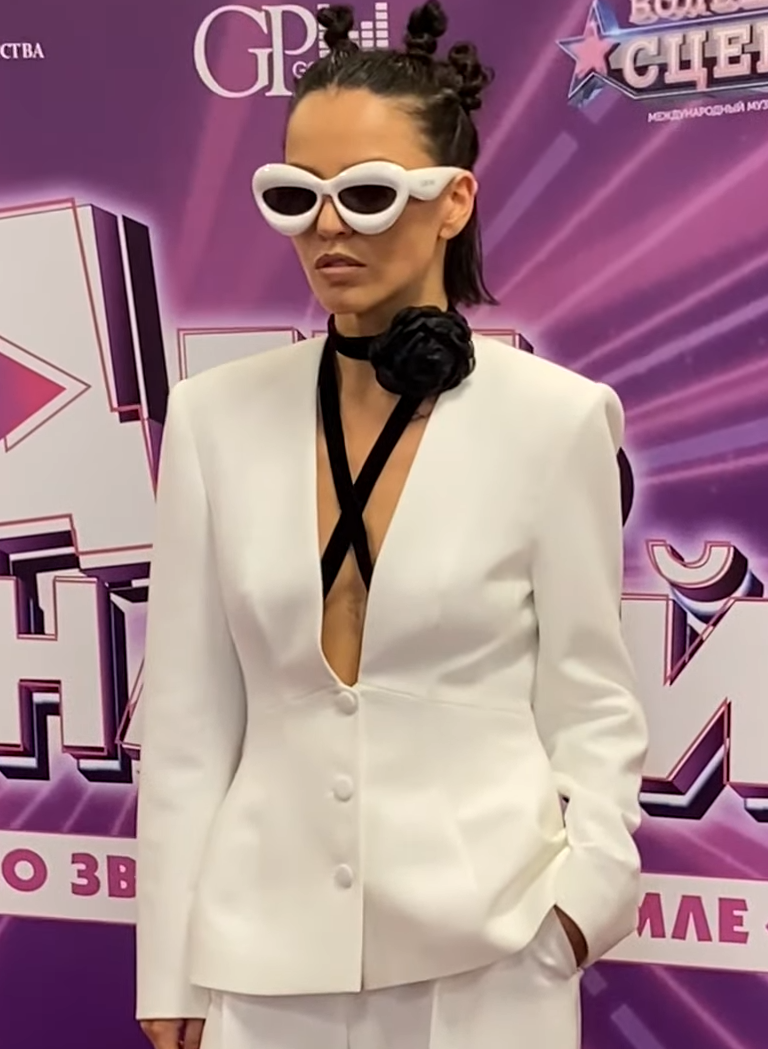
Zivert (12)

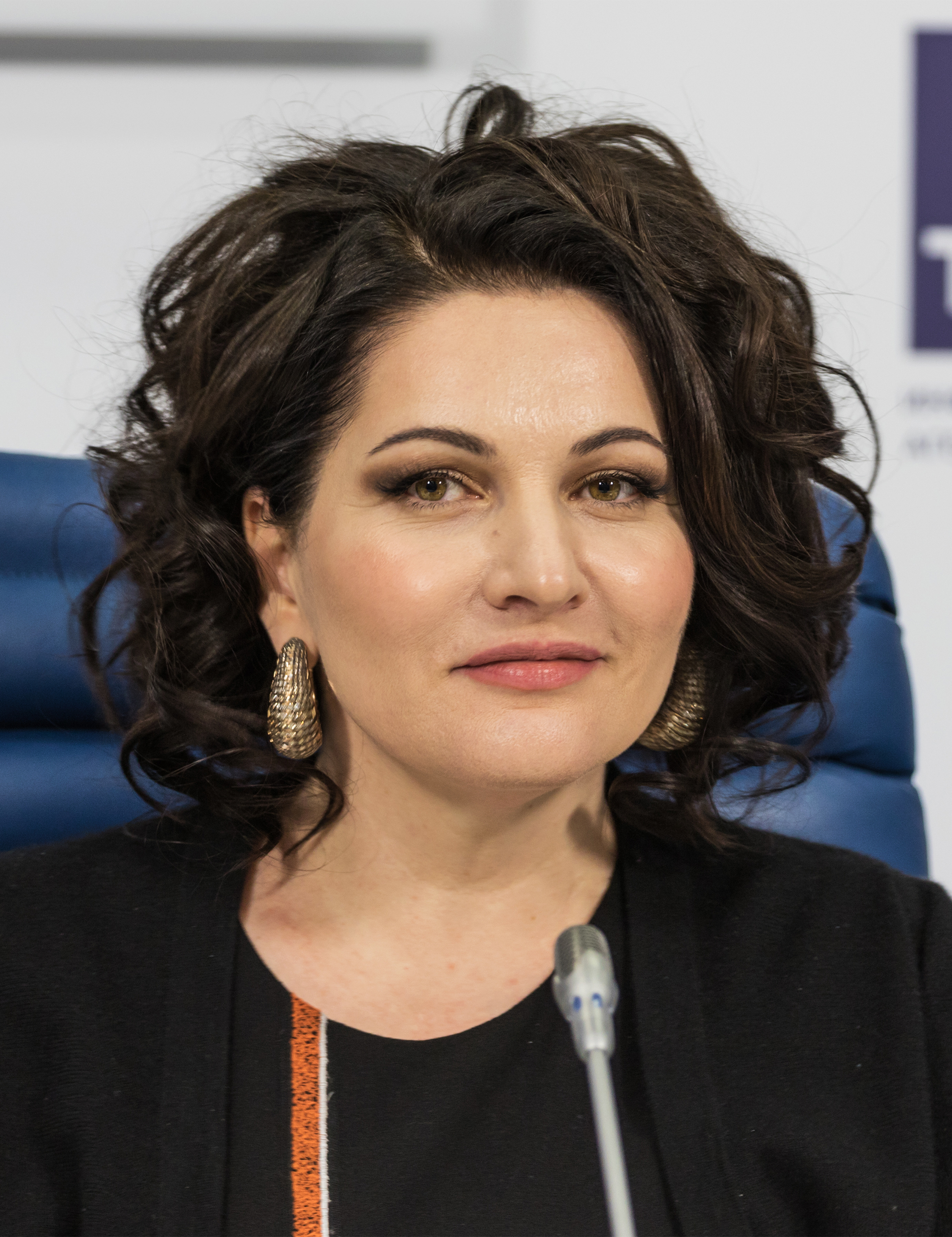
Hibla Gerzmava (13)

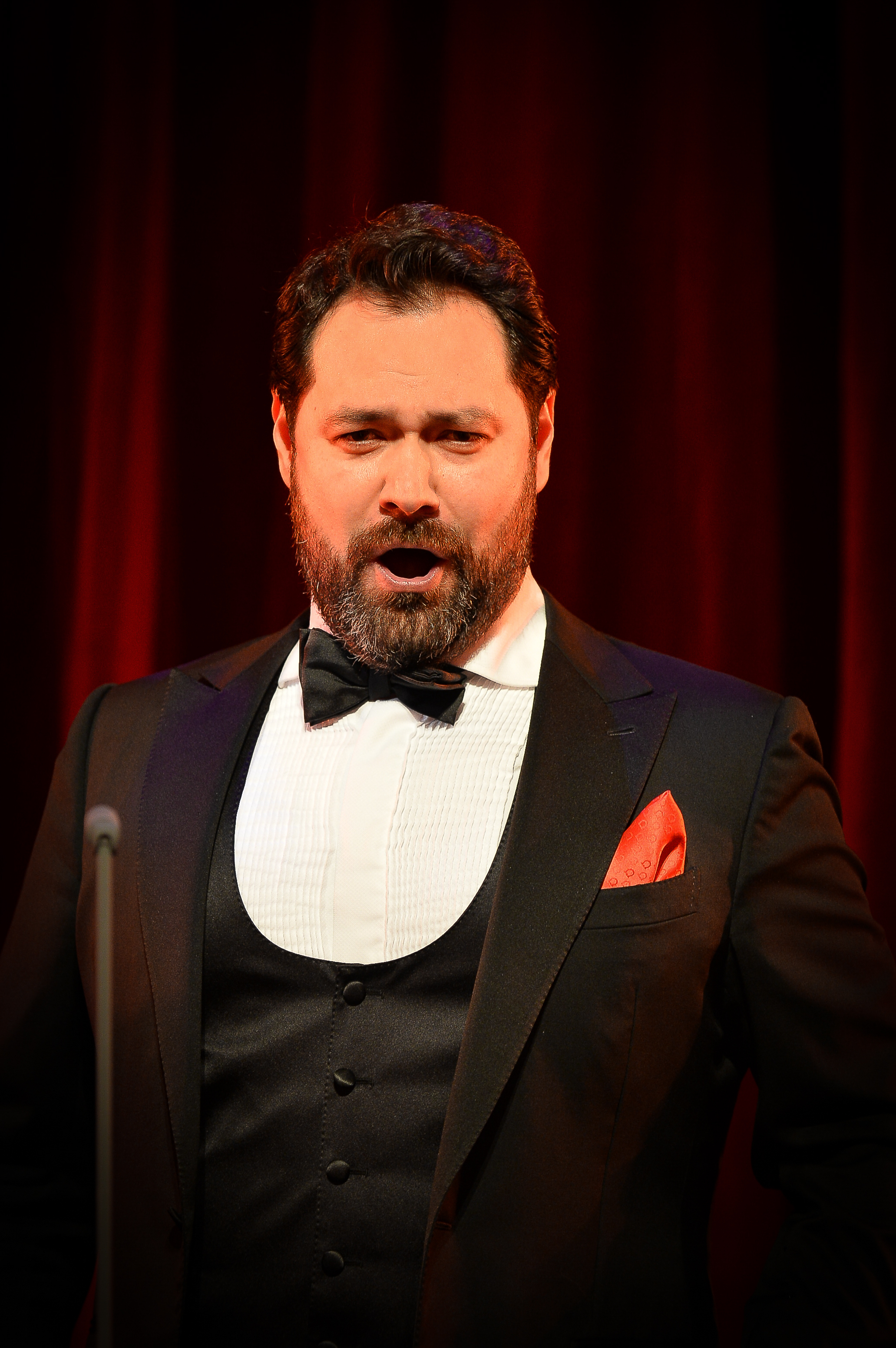
Ildar Abdrazakov (14-)

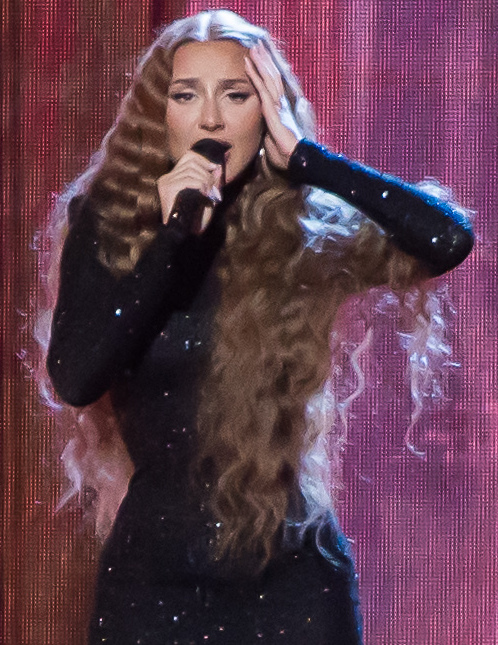
ANNA ASTI (14-)

=== Presenter ===
Timeline of presenter
Presenter	Seasons													
Presenter	1	2	3	4	5	6	7	8	9	10	11	12	13	14
Dmitry Nagiev														
Yana Churikova														

Presenters

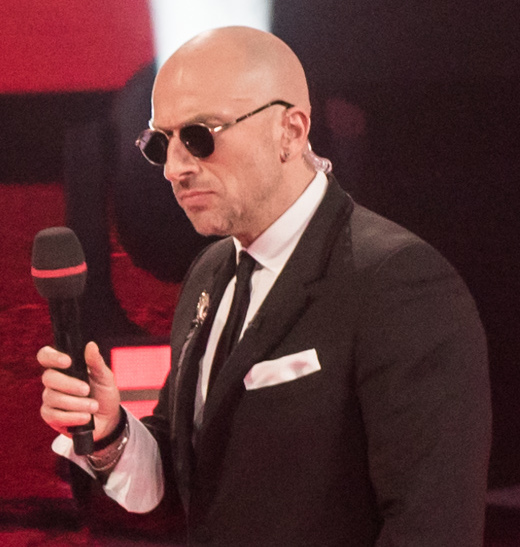
Dmitry Nagiev (2012-2021)

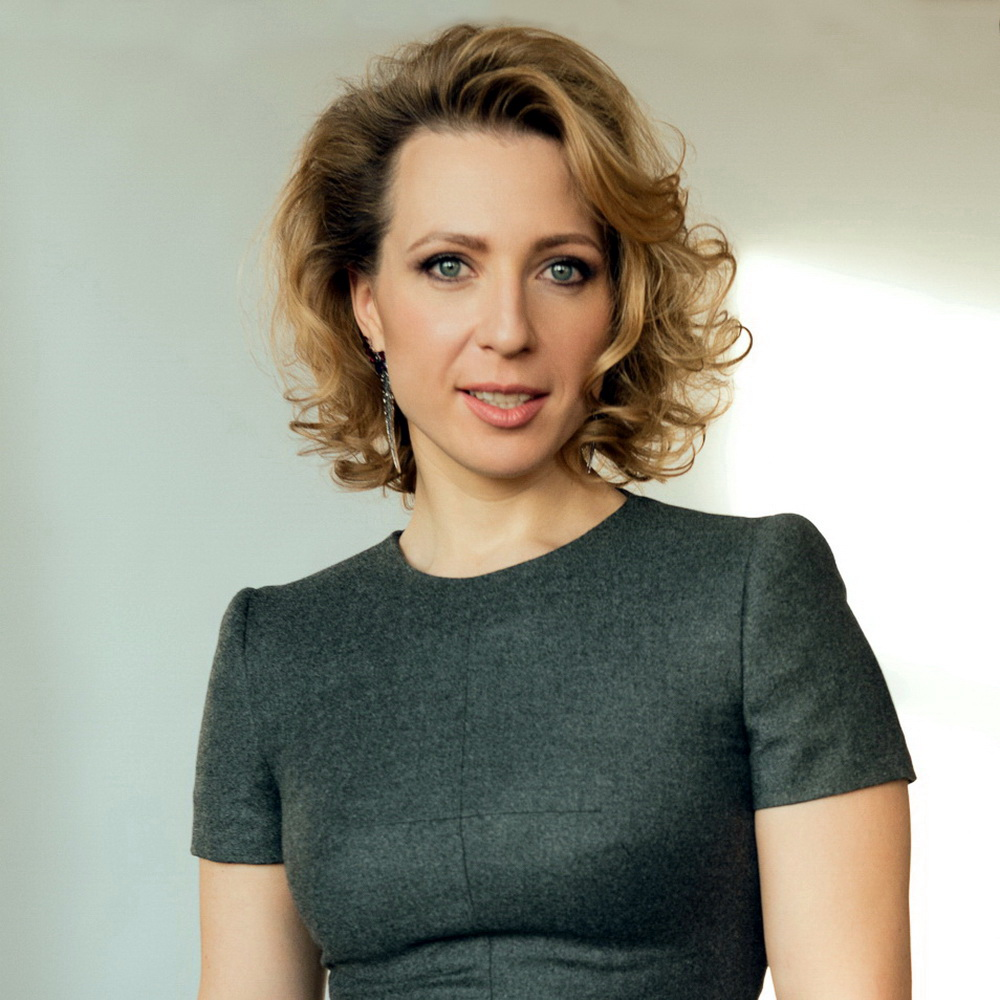
Yana Churikova (2023―)

== Coaches and finalists ==
Color key
Winner
Runner-up
Third place
Fourth place

- Warning: the following table presents a significant amount of different colors.
- Winners are in bold, the finalists in the finale are in normal size font, and the eliminated artists are in small font.

Season	Coaches and their finalists			
1	Dima Bilan	Pelageya	Alexander Gradsky	Leonid Agutin
1	Margarita Pozoyan; Olga Klyayn	Elmira Kalimullina; Maria Goya	**Dina Garipova**; Evgeny Kungurov	Anastasiya Spiridonova; Edvard Khacharyan
2	Gela Guralia; Andrey Tsvetkov	Tina Kuznetsova; Anton Belyaev	**Sergey Volchkov**; Sharip Umkhanov	Nargiz Zakirova; Elena Maksimova
3	Alexander Bon; Ksana Sergienko	Yaroslav Dronov; Alisa Ignatyeva	**Alexandra Vorobyova**; Valentina Biryukova	Mariam Merabova; Intars Busulis
4	Basta	Polina Gagarina	Alexander Gradsky	Grigory Leps
4	Era Kann; Mariya Eroyan	Olga Zadonskaya; Ivan Dalmatov	Mikhail Ozerov; Elena Minina	**Hieromonk Fotiy**; Vitold Petrovsky
5	Dima Bilan	Polina Gagarina	Leonid Agutin	Grigory Leps
5	Kayrat Primberdiev; Oleg Kondrakov	Sardor Milano; Mikhail Zhitov	**Darya Antonyuk**; Kseniya Korobkova	Alexander Panayotov; Dariya Stavrovich
6	Dima Bilan	Pelageya	Alexander Gradsky	Leonid Agutin
6	Yang Ge; Daniil Buranov	Ladislav Bubnar; Anton Lavrentyev	**Selim Alakhyarov**; Lora Gorbunova	Timofey Kopylov; Brandon Stone
7	Basta	Ani Lorak	Sergey Shnurov	Konstantin Meladze
7	Shaen Oganesyan; Andrey Polyakov	Amirkhan Umaev; Uku Suviste	Rushana Valieva; Daniel Rustamov	**Pyotr Zakharov**; Sofia Tarasova
8	Valery Syutkin	Polina Gagarina	Sergey Shnurov	Konstantin Meladze
8	Arsen Mukendi; Elimdar Seydosmanov	Iv Nabiev; Alana Chochieva	Anton Tokarev; Ragda Khanieva	**Asker Berbekov**; Nurzhigit Subankulov
9	Basta	Polina Gagarina	Sergey Shnurov	Valery Syutkin
9	Vasily Pasechnik; Elizaveta Puris	**Yana Gabbasova**; Kirill Suslov	Dmitry Vengerov; Mariya Rusakova	Oleg Akkuratov; Suren Platonov
10	Dima Bilan	Pelageya	Alexander Gradsky	Leonid Agutin
10	Ernar Sadirbaev; Ilkhom Tagirov	**Alexander Volkodav**; Yulia Koshkina	Alisher Karimov; Tatiana Kachurina	Elina Pan; Vyacheslav Yavkin
11	Vladimir Presnyakov	Polina Gagarina	Basta	Anton Belyaev
11	Elmira Divaeva; Margarita Bagdasaryan	**Viktoria Solomakhina**; Nadezhda Proskurina	Lyudmila Serebryakova; Pavel Zibrov	Irina Syshchikova; Nikolay Shcherba
12	Vladimir Presnyakov	Polina Gagarina	Zivert	Anton Belyaev
12	Georgy Russkikh; Darya Zvezdina	**Bogdan Shuvalov**; Evgeny Kurchich	Alexey Sulima; Polina Chusovitina	Anastasiya Sadkovskaya; Beka Shoshiashvili
13	Basta	Polina Gagarina	Hibla Gerzmava	Anton Belyaev
13	Ilya Altukhov; Valery Ragulin	Valentina Yanshina; Natalya Sergienko	**David Sanikidze**; Matvey Kozin	Dzambolat Dulaev; Yonatan Tashchan
14	Vladimir Presnyakov	Pelageya	Ildar Abdrazakov	ANNA ASTI
14	Alexey Smirnov; Kseniya Aksyutik	Alexander Guzko; Valery Makarov	**Elmira Karakhanova**; Valeriya Petrova	Arsen Stepanyan; Yuliya Mazunova

== Series overview ==
Teams color key

Team Dima Bilan
Team Pelageya
Team Alexander Gradsky
Team Leonid Agutin
Team Basta
Team Polina Gagarina

Team Grigory Leps
Team Ani Lorak
Team Sergey Shnurov
Team Konstantin Meladze
Team Valeriy Syutkin
Team Vladimir Presnyakov

Team Anton Belyaev
Team Zivert
Team Hibla Gerzmava
Team Ildar Abdrazakov
Team ANNA ASTI

Season	Year	Winner	Runner-up	Third place	Fourth place	Winning Coach	Presenters	Coaches (chair's order)			
Season	Year	Winner	Runner-up	Third place	Fourth place	Winning Coach	Presenters	1	2	3	4
1	2012	Dina Garipova	Elmira Kalimullina	Anastasiya Spiridonova	Margarita Pozoyan	Alexander Gradsky	Dmitry Nagiev	Dima	Pelageya	Alexander	Leonid
2	2013	Sergey Volchkov	Nargiz Zakirova	Gela Guralia	Tina Kuznetsova	Alexander Gradsky	Dmitry Nagiev	Dima	Pelageya	Alexander	Leonid
3	2014	Alexandra Vorobyova	Yaroslav Dronov	Alexander Bon	Mariam Merabova	Alexander Gradsky	Dmitry Nagiev	Leonid	Pelageya	Alexander	Dima
4	2015	Hieromonk Fotiy	Mikhail Ozerov	Olga Zadonskaya	Era Kann	Grigory Leps	Dmitry Nagiev	Basta	Polina	Alexander	Grigory
5	2016	Darya Antonyuk	Alexander Panayotov	Kayrat Primberdiev	Sardor Milano	Leonid Agutin	Dmitry Nagiev	Dima	Polina	Leonid	Grigory
6	2017	Selim Alakhyarov	Timofey Kopylyov	Ladislav Bubnar	Yang Ge	Alexander Gradsky	Dmitry Nagiev	Dima	Pelageya	Alexander	Leonid
7	2018-19	Pyotr Zakharov	Amirkhan Umaev	Rushana Valieva	Shaen Oganesyan	Konstantin Meladze	Dmitry Nagiev	Basta	Ani Lorak	Sergey	Konstantin
8	2019-20	Asker Berbekov	Anton Tokarev	Iv Nabiev	Arsen Mukendi	Konstantin Meladze	Dmitry Nagiev	Valeriy	Polina	Sergey	Konstantin
9	2020	Yana Gabbasova	Oleg Akkuratov	Dmitry Vengerov	Vasily Pasechnik	Polina Gagarina	Dmitry Nagiev	Basta	Polina	Sergey	Valeriy
10	2021	Alexander Volkodav	Alisher Karimov	Ernar Sadirbaev	Elina Pan	Pelageya	Dmitry Nagiev	Dima	Pelageya	Alexander	Leonid
11	2023	Viktoriya Solomakhina	Elmira Divaeva	Irina Syshchikova	Lyudmila Serebryakova	Polina Gagarina	Yana Churikova	Vladimir	Polina	Basta	Anton
12	2024	Bogdan Shuvalov	Georgy Russkikh	Alexey Sulima	Anastasiya Sadkovskaya	Polina Gagarina	Yana Churikova	Vladimir	Polina	Zivert	Anton
13	2025	David Sanikidze	Dzambolat Dulaev	Ilya Altukhov	Valentina Yanshina	Hibla Gerzmava	Yana Churikova	Basta	Polina	Hibla	Anton
14	2026	Elmira Karakhanova	Alexey Smirnov	Alexander Guzko	Arsen Stepanyan	Ildar Abdrazakov	Yana Churikova	Vladimir	Pelageya	Ildar	ASTI

=== Coaches' results ===
Coaches' results
Coach	Winner	Runner-up	Third place	Fourth place
Alexander Gradsky	4 times (1–3, 6)	2 times (4, 10)	—	—
Polina Gagarina	3 times (9, 11–12)	—	2 times (4, 8)	2 times (5, 13)
Konstantin Meladze	2 times (7–8)	—	—	—
Pelageya	Once (10)	2 times (1, 3)	2 times (6, 14)	Once (2)
Leonid Agutin	Once (5)	2 times (2, 6)	Once (1)	2 times (3, 10)
Grigory Leps	Once (4)	Once (5)	—	—
Hibla Gerzmava	Once (13)	—	—	—
Ildar Abdrazakov	Once (14)	—	—	—
Vladimir Presnyakov	—	3 times (11–12, 14)	—	—
Sergey Shnurov	—	Once (8)	2 times (7, 9)	—
Anton Belyaev	—	Once (13)	Once (11)	Once (12)
Valeriy Syutkin	—	Once (9)	—	Once (8)
Ani Lorak	—	Once (7)	—	—
Dima Bilan	—	—	4 times (2–3, 5, 10)	2 times (1, 6)
Basta	—	—	Once (13)	4 times (4, 7, 9, 11)
Zivert	—	—	Once (12)	—
ANNA ASTI	—	—	—	Once (14)

== Best coach ==
Season	Best season coach								
Season	First place		Second place			Third place		Fourth place	
1−6, 10	From seasons 1 through 6 and 10, the public didn't determine the Best coach.								
7	Sergey Shnurov	34%	Konstantin Meladze		30%	Basta	24%	Ani Lorak	12%
8	Sergey Shnurov	40%	Konstantin Meladze		28%	Polina Gagarina	19%	Valeriy Syutkin	13%
9	Basta	31%	Sergey; Shnurov		28%	Polina Gagarina	23%	Valeriy Syutkin	18%
11	Basta	47%	Polina Gagarina		23%	Vladimir Presnyakov	20%	Anton Belyaev	10%
12	Polina Gagarina	32%	Vladimir Presnyakov		31%	Anton Belyaev	23%	Zivert	14%
13	Basta	36%	Polina Gagarina	Hibla Gerzmava	23%	—		Anton Belyaev	18%
14	Pelageya	45%	Vladimir Presnyakov		24%	Ildar Abdrazakov	18%	ANNA ASTI	13%

== Reception ==
The Voice (ratings) : Russia viewers per episode (millions)

Season	Episode number																		Average
Season	1	2	3	4	5	6	7	8	9	10	11	12	13	14	15	16	17	18	Average
1	5.5	6.9	7.0	7.8	8.8	8.4	8.0	8.4	7.7	7.4	7.7	9.2	7.7	–					7.73
2	9.5	8.6	8.9	9.4	9.5	10.0	9.4	9.1	9.1	8.3	9.4	9.0	8.5	9.1	9.2	9.5	9.8	–	9.19
3	7.9	8.0	8.8	8.6	8.6	9.4	8.7	7.8	6.5	7.8	8.4	7.4	7.6	6.3	6.7	7.6	8.2	–	7.9
4	8.4	7.3	7.2	6.6	7.0	7.7	7.5	7.2	6.8	6.5	6.5	6.5	6.1	5.7	5.5	6.0	6.6	–	6.77
5	6.8	7.1	7.3	7.7	8.6	8.1	8.1	8.0	7.7	6.3	7.1	6.9	6.8	6.6	5.8	6.2	6.0	6.3	7.08
6	6.5	6.2	5.8	5.8	6.3	6.2	6.6	6.4	6.0	5.9	5.7	5.4	5.5	5.8	5.3	5.3	5.2	5.5	5.86
7	5.2	4.7	4.9	5.2	5.9	5.5	4.7	4.5	4.7	4.5	4.3	3.9	5.3	–					4.87
8	5.9	5.2	5.4	5.0	5.6	5.3	5.1	4.6	4.7	4.8	4.8	4.5	4.8	–					5.02
9	5.0	4.8	5.0	5.1	5.1	5.1	4.7	4.9	4.6	4.4	4.5	4.5	4.5	–					4.78

Source: MediaScope

=== Seasons average: Ratings ===
The first season premiered on October 5, 2012 with a 5.5 rating in the 18-49 demographic. For its average season rating, the show was in the Top 5 at a 7.73 ranking.

The second season premiered on September 6, 2013 with a 9.5 in the 18–49 demographic. It was up from last season's premiere by 4.0 rating scores.

The third season premiered on September 5, 2014 with a 7.9 in the 18-49 demographic. It was down from last season's premiere by 1.6 rating scores.

The fourth season premiered on September 4, 2015 with an 8.4 in the 18-49 demographic. It was up from last season's premiere by .5 rating scores.

The fifth season premiered on September 2, 2016 with a 6.8 in the 18-49 demographic. It was down from last season's premiere by 1.6 rating scores.

The sixth season premiered on September 1, 2017 with a 6.5 in the 18-49 demographic. It was down from last season's premiere by .3 rating scores.

The seventh season premiered on October 12, 2018 with a 5.2 in the 18-49 demographic. It was down from last season's premiere by 1.3 rating scores.

The eighth season premiered on October 11, 2019 with a 5.9 in the 18-49 demographic. It was up from last season's premiere by .7 rating scores.

The ninth season premiered on October 9, 2020 with a 5.0 in the 18-49 demographic. It was down from last season's premiere by .9 rating scores. This is the lowest rated season premiere to date.

Each Russian network television season starts in late August and ends in late May.

Sea- son	Timeslot (MSK (UTC+03))	# Ep.	Premiered		Ended		TV season	Viewers (ratings)
Sea- son	Timeslot (MSK (UTC+03))	# Ep.	Date	Premiere viewers (ratings)	Date	Final viewers (ratings)	TV season	Viewers (ratings)
1	Friday 9:30 pm (eps. 1–4, 6–9, 11–12); Sunday 9:20 pm (ep. 5); Friday 7:50 pm (ep. 10); Saturday 9:30 pm (Final)	13	Oct 5, 2012	5.5	Dec 29, 2012	7.7	2012/13	7.73
2	Friday 9:30 pm (eps. 1–5, 7–17); Saturday 9:20 pm (ep. 6)	17	Sep 6, 2013	9.5	Dec 27, 2013	9.8	2013/14	9.19
3	Friday 9:45 pm (eps. 1–13); Friday 9:35 pm (eps. 14–17)	17	Sep 5, 2014	7.9	Dec 26, 2014	8.2	2014/15	7.90
4	Friday 9:30 pm	17	Sep 4, 2015	8.4	Dec 25, 2015	6.6	2015/16	6.77
5	Friday 9:30 pm	18	Sep 2, 2016	6.8	Dec 30, 2016	6.3	2016/17	7.08
6	Friday 9:30 pm	18	Sep 1, 2017	6.5	Dec 29, 2017	5.5	2017/18	5.86
7	Friday 9:30 pm (eps. 1–12); Tuesday 8:00 pm (Final)	13	Oct 12, 2018	5.2	Jan 1, 2019	5.3	2018/19	4.87
8	Friday 9:30 pm (eps. 1–12); Wednesday 8:00 pm (Final)	13	Oct 11, 2019	5.9	Jan 1, 2020	4.8	2019/20	5.02
9	Friday 9:30 pm	13	Oct 9, 2020	5.0	Dec 30. 2020	4.5	2020/21	4.78
