= The Voice (Russian TV series) season 10 =

The Voice
- Season 10
- Presented by: Dmitry Nagiev
- Coaches: Dima Bilan; Pelageya; Alexander Gradsky; Leonid Agutin
- Winner: Alexandr Volkodav
- Winning coach: Pelageya
- Runner-up: Alisher Karimov

Release
- Original network: Channel One
- Original release: 8 October – 30 December 2021

Season chronology
- ← Previous; Season 9 Next → Season 11

The tenth season of the Russian reality talent show The Voice premiered on October 8, 2021, on Channel One. On August 16, 2021 Channel One announced that Dima Bilan, Pelageya, Alexander Gradsky and Leonid Agutin would be returning as coaches after a three-season break. Dmitry Nagiev returned as the show's presenter. This was also the first time in The Voice franchise history that coaches from the inaugural season returned for the anniversary season.

On November 28, 2021, one of the coaches, Alexander Gradsky, died during the season. At the time of his death, 8 episodes of the show were broadcast, 2 episodes were filmed. The press service of Channel One announced that the season will be over in memory of Gradsky.

Alexandr Volkodav was announced the winner on December 30, 2021, marking Pelageya's first win as a coach after five attempts and the second female coach to win in the show's history, behind Polina Gagarina. Pelageya became the first coach in the history of the Russian Voice who won all versions of the show; winning the fifth season of The Voice Kids and in the first and second season of The Voice Senior

== Teams ==
Colour key

- Winner
- Runner-up
- Third place
- Fourth place
- Eliminated in the Semifinal
- Eliminated in the Quarterfinal
- Stolen in the Knockout rounds
- Eliminated in the Knockout rounds
- Eliminated in the Battle rounds

Coaches	Top 49 artists				
Dima Bilan					
Dima Bilan	Ernar Sadirbaev	Ilkhom Tagirov	Yulia Kurganova	~~Elina Pan~~	Maxim Yudin
Dima Bilan	Nikita Bysyuk	Adilet Zhumabekov	David Levin	Flora Bichakhchan	Maxim Zavidiya
Dima Bilan	Olga & Lyubov Kuznetsovs	Olga Balandina	Rustim Bakhtiyarov		
Pelageya					
Pelageya	Alexandr Volkodav	Yulia Koshkina	Viktor Kirillov	Aliy Tlyunyaev	Svetlana Malyutkina
Pelageya	Darya Kopeykina	Yulia Plaksina	Ekaterina Tsymlova	Vasiliy Bodzhgua	Natalya Soboleva
Pelageya	Veronika Mokhireva	Alexandr Shpagin	Maxim Dmitriev		
Alexander Gradsky					
Alexander Gradsky	Alisher Karimov	Tatyana Kachurina	Karina Kuper	~~Viktor Kirillov~~	~~Yulia Kurganova~~
Alexander Gradsky	Miroslava Kocheva	Roman Grafov	Marina Moiseeva	Adilkhan Makin	Yulia Koval
Alexander Gradsky	Nika Khargiyanova	Samvel Azatyan	Polina Klinnikova	Ester Kandinova	
Leonid Agutin					
Leonid Agutin	Elina Pan	Vyacheslav Yavkin	Yuri Navrotskiy	~~Karina Kuper~~	Alexandr Li
Leonid Agutin	Tamara Kutidze	Ivan Kharkovskiy	Olesya Polishchuk	Diana Obolashvili	Ana Agrba
Leonid Agutin	Artur Bogdanov	Arina Danilova	Elizaveta Sharipova		
Note: Italicized names are stolen contestans (names struck through within former names).

== Blind auditions ==
Color key

✔	Coach pressed "I WANT YOU" button
✔	Coach pressed "I WANT YOU", despite the lack places in his/her team
	Coach pressed "I WANT YOU" button, even its team was already full, and artist defaulted to a coach's team
	Artist defaulted to a coach's team
	Artist elected a coach's team
	Artist eliminated with no coach pressing their button

=== Episode 1 (October 8) ===
The coaches performed «All You Need Is Love» at the start of the show.

Order	Artist	Age	Origin	Song	Coach's and artist's choices			
Order	Artist	Age	Origin	Song	Bilan	Pelageya	Gradsky	Agutin
1	Dmitry Kabunin	30	Penza	«Ночь»	—	—	—	—
2	Darya Kopeykina	17	Orsk	«Hava nagila»	—	✔	—	✔
3	Yulia Plaksina	29	Moscow	«Eye of the Tiger»	✔	✔	—	✔
4	Vyacheslav Yavkin	25	Saransk	«Беловежская пуща»	✔	✔	✔	✔
5	Marina Moiseeva	49	Moscow	«What's Up?»	—	—	✔	—
6	Nadezhda Tochilkina	24	Saratov	«Нас не догонят»	—	—	—	—
7	Maxim Zavidiya	32	Chișinău, Moldova	«Say Something	✔	✔	✔	—
8	Ester Kandinova	30	Saint Petersburg	«Карамболина, Карамболетта!»	—	—	✔	—
9	Milena Sarkisyan	24	Moscow	«Beggin'»	—	—	—	—
10	Adilkhan Makin	27	Petropavlovsk, Kazakhstan	«Не отрекаются, любя»	✔	—	✔	—
11	Nikita Bysyuk	24	Minsk, Belarus	«Payphone»	✔	—	—	—

=== Episode 2 (October 15) ===
Order	Artist	Age	Origin	Song	Coach's and artist's choices			
Order	Artist	Age	Origin	Song	Bilan	Pelageya	Gradsky	Agutin
1	Dina Garipova	30	Zelenodolsk	«А напоследок я скажу»	✔	✔	—	✔
2	Eric Panich	17	Moscow	«Natural»	—	—	—	—
3	Tamara Kutidze	19	Podolsk	«Тбилисо»	—	✔	—	✔
4	Natalia Soboleva	19	Moscow	«Ласточка»	—	✔	—	—
5	Ivan Kharkovsky	32	Moscow	«Знаешь?»	✔	✔	✔	✔
6	Anna Ginz	28	Melbourne, Australia	«Always Remember Us This Way»	—	—	—	—
7	Elina Pan	29	Norilsk	«I'm Every Woman»	✔	—	—	✔
8	Ilkhom Tagirov	27	Dushanbe, Tajikistan	«Dream a Little Dream of Me»	✔	✔	✔	✔
9	Sofia Moris	18	Odintsovo	«Опять метель»	—	—	—	—
10	Rustim Bakhtiyarov	35	Gubakha	«Nessun dorma»	✔	—	—	—
11	Yulia Kurganova	26	Chelyabinsk	«Улетаю»	—	—	✔	—
12	Alexandr Volkodav	32	Bishkek, Kyrgyzstan	«Supergirl»	—	✔	✔	—

=== Episode 3 (October 22) ===
Order	Artist	Age	Origin	Song	Coach's and artist's choices			
Order	Artist	Age	Origin	Song	Bilan	Pelageya	Gradsky	Agutin
1	Agata Vavilova	34	Saint Petersburg	«Дуся-агрегат»	—	—	—	—
2	Aliy Tlyunyaev	25	Adygeya	«Crazy»	✔	✔	✔	✔
3	Arina Danilova	17	Yakutsk	«Quizas, Quizas, Quizas»	—	✔	—	✔
4	Flora Bichakhchan	24	Ekaterinburg	«Старый отель»	✔	—	—	✔
5	Alexey Tavleev	24	Sochi	«Blinding Lights»	—	—	—	—
6	Tatyana Kachurina	22	Lipetsk	«Non, je ne regrette rien»	✔	✔	✔	✔
7	Adilet Zhumabekov	30	Bishkek, Kyrgyzstan	«End of the Road»	✔	—	✔	✔
8	Alma Boe	34	Moscow	«Пока горит свеча»	—	—	—	—
9	Roman Grafov	30	Rubtsovsk	«О чём задумались, мадам?»	—	—	✔	—
10	Ekaterina Khadulaeva	26	Krasnoyarsk	«Ты отпусти»	—	—	—	—
11	David Levin	34	Moscow	«Grace Kelly»	✔	—	—	—
12	Yulia Koval	30	Novokuibyshevsk	«Always Remember Us This Way»	—	—	✔	—

=== Episode 4 (October 29) ===
Order	Artist	Age	Origin	Song	Coach's and artist's choices			
Order	Artist	Age	Origin	Song	Bilan	Pelageya	Gradsky	Agutin
1	Artur Bogdanov	33	Saint Petersburg	«Очи чёрные»	✔	✔	—	✔
2	Elizaveta Taivan	33	Surgut	«Never Enough»	—	—	—	—
3	Pavel Brik	27	Barnaul	«Sorry Seems to Be the Hardest Word»	—	—	—	—
4	Polina Klinnikova	33	Kimry	«Я танцевать хочу»	—	—	✔	—
5	Olga Balandina	26	Naberezhnye Chelny	«Still of the Night»	✔	✔	✔	✔
6	Vasiliy Bodzhgua	25	Domodedovo	«Love in Portofino»	—	✔	—	—
7	Margarita Kolotilina	42	Pervomayskiy	«А за окном то дождь, то снег»	—	—	—	—
8	Ernar Sadirbaev	26	Nur-Sultan, Kazakhstan	«Part-Time Lover»	✔	✔	✔	✔
9	Ekaterina Tsymlova	26	Lugansk, Ukraine	«Чорнобривці»	—	✔	—	—
10	Miroslava Kocheva	17	Volokolamsk	«Выключи свет»	✔	—	✔	—
11	Mikhail Vasilenko	26	Taganrog	«Орлы или во́роны»	—	—	—	—
12	Diana Obolashvili	21	Prokhladny	«So What»	—	✔	—	✔

=== Episode 5 (November 5) ===
Order	Artist	Age	Origin	Song	Coach's and artist's choices			
Order	Artist	Age	Origin	Song	Bilan	Pelageya	Gradsky	Agutin
1	Yuri Navrotskiy	30	Minsk, Belarus	«Love Runs Out»	—	✔	✔	✔
2	Gleb Sablev	22	Yaroslavl	«Молния»	—	—	—	—
3	Elizaveta Sharipova	18	Novosibirsk	«Oh! Darling»	—	✔	—	✔
4	Alexandr Shpagin	46	Chusovoy	«Я не люблю»	—	✔	—	—
5	Karina Kuper	32	Los Angeles / Saratov	«Saving All My Love for You»	—	—	✔	✔
6	Bahram Islamov	37	Kazan	«Комета»	—	—	—	—
7	Olga & Lyubov Kuznetsovy	22	Plesetsk	«Lady Marmelade»	✔	✔	—	✔
8	Ivan Vikulov	39	Omsk	«Somos Novios»	—	—	—	—
9	Ana Agrba	28	Sukhumi, Georgia	«День опять погас»	—	—	—	✔
10	Anastasia Dyomshina	30	Kotelnich	«Ищу тебя»	—	—	—	—
11	Alisher Karimov	35	Nur-Sultan, Kazakhstan	«Вечная любовь»	—	—	✔	—
12	Viktor Kirillov	40	Khabarovsk	«Too Close»	✔	✔	✔	✔

=== Episode 6 (November 12) ===
Order	Artist	Age	Origin	Song	Coach's and artist's choices			
Order	Artist	Age	Origin	Song	Bilan	Pelageya	Gradsky	Agutin
1	Ninel Grigoryeva	34	Saint Petersburg	«Эхо любви»	—	—	—	—
2	Alexandr Li	29	Tashkent, Uzbekistan	«Ты горишь как огонь»	—	✔	—	✔
3	Svetlana Malyutkina	34	Saint Petersburg	«Highway to Hell»	—	✔	—	✔
4	Nikolay Volegov	32	Borisov, Belarus	«Катастрофически»	—	—	—	—
5	Veronika Mokhireva	23	Yekaterinburg	«La vie en rose»	✔	✔	—	✔
6	Maxim Yudin	32	Yekaterinburg	«Mercy»	✔	✔	—	—
7	Margarita Golubeva	20	Toksovo	«Вишня»	Team full	—	—	—
8	Samvel Azatyan	22	Yerevan, Armenia	«Black or White»	Team full	—	✔	—
9	Olesya Polishchuk	24	Kazan	«Блюз»	Team full	—	Team full	✔
10	Maxim Dmitriyev	19	Tynda	«I Put a Spell on You»	Team full	✔	Team full	Team full
11	Nika Khargiyanova	22	Moscow	«Слёзы»	Team full	—	✔	Team full
12	Alena Karnaukhova	25	Ust-Ilimsk	«Power»	Team full	—	Team full	Team full
13	Yulia Koshkina	26	Irkutsk	«На заре»	✔	✔	✔	✔

== The Battles ==
The Battle Rounds will be starting on November 19, 2021. No steal were available. Contestants who win their battle would advance to the Knockout rounds.

Colour key

Artist won the Battle and advanced to the Knockouts
Artist lost the Battle and was eliminated

Episode	Coach	Order	Winner	Song	Loser
Episode 7 (November 19, 2021)	Dima Bilan	1	Maxim Yudin	«Cheri, Cheri Lady»	David Levin
Episode 7 (November 19, 2021)	Alexander Gradsky	2	Miroslava Kocheva	«Ты на свете есть»	Marina Moiseeva
Episode 7 (November 19, 2021)	Alexander Gradsky	2	Miroslava Kocheva	«Ты на свете есть»	Adilkhan Makin
Episode 7 (November 19, 2021)	Leonid Agutin	3	Vyacheslav Yavkin	«Beauty and the Beast»	Olesya Polishchuk
Episode 7 (November 19, 2021)	Pelageya	4	Yulia Koshkina	«На тропинке»	Ekaterina Tsymlova
Episode 7 (November 19, 2021)	Dima Bilan	5	Adilet Zhumabekov	«Ain't No Mountain High Enough»	Flora Bichakhchan
Episode 7 (November 19, 2021)	Alexander Gradsky	6	Yulia Kurganova	«Частушки»	Yulia Koval
Episode 7 (November 19, 2021)	Pelageya	7	Alexandr Volkodav	«The Sound of Silence»	Vasiliy Bodzhgua
Episode 7 (November 19, 2021)	Leonid Agutin	8	Yuri Navrotskiy	«Кружит»	Diana Obolashvili
Episode 7 (November 19, 2021)	Alexander Gradsky	9	Viktor Kirillov	«Don't Let the Sun Go Down on Me»	Nika Khargiyanova
Episode 7 (November 19, 2021)	Dima Bilan	10	Ilkhom Tagirov	«Океан»	Maxim Zavidiya
Episode 7 (November 19, 2021)	Leonid Agutin	11	Alexandr Li	«Seven Nation Army»	Ana Agrba
Episode 7 (November 19, 2021)	Pelageya	12	Svetlana Malyutkina	«О, жизнь без завтрашнего дня!»	Natalya Soboleva
Episode 8 (November 26, 2021)	Dima Bilan	1	Elina Pan	«Like a Prayer»	Olga & Lyubov Kuznetsovy
Episode 8 (November 26, 2021)	Leonid Agutin	2	Tamara Kutidze	«Ещё минута»	Artur Bogdanov
Episode 8 (November 26, 2021)	Pelageya	3	Yulia Plaksina	«Don't Speak»	Veronika Mokhireva
Episode 8 (November 26, 2021)	Alexander Gradsky	4	Tatyana Kachurina	«La vie s’en va»	Samvel Azatyan
Episode 8 (November 26, 2021)	Dima Bilan	5	Nikita Bysyuk	«Комета»	Olga Balandina
Episode 8 (November 26, 2021)	Leonid Agutin	6	Ivan Kharkovskiy	«All of Me»	Arina Danilova
Episode 8 (November 26, 2021)	Pelageya	7	Aliy Tlyunyaev	«Кукла с человеческим лицом»	Alexandr Shpagin
Episode 8 (November 26, 2021)	Alexander Gradsky	8	Alisher Karimov	«The Prayer»	Polina Klinnikova
Episode 8 (November 26, 2021)	Leonid Agutin	9	Karina Kuper	«Чувства»	Elizaveta Sharipova
Episode 8 (November 26, 2021)	Dima Bilan	10	Ernar Sadirbaev	«Мне с детства снилась высота»	Rustim Bakhtiyarov
Episode 8 (November 26, 2021)	Pelageya	11	Darya Kopeykina	«Where You Are»	Maxim Dmitriev
Episode 8 (November 26, 2021)	Alexander Gradsky	12	Roman Grafov	«Опять мы здесь»	Ester Kandinova

== The Knockouts ==
The Knockout Rounds started on December 3, 2021. Similar to the previous season, each coach pairs three artists into one knockout with only one contestant from the trio advances to the next round and also can steal one losing artist from another coach. The top 12 contestants moved on to the Quarterfinal. The Knockouts were filmed 10 days before the death of Alexander Gradsky.

Colour key

Artist won the Knockout and advanced to the Quarterfinal
Artist lost the Knockout but was stolen by another coach and advanced to the Quarterfinal
Artist lost the Knockout and was eliminated

Episode	Coach	Order	Song	Artists		Song	'Steal' result			
Episode	Coach	Order	Song	Winner	Losers	Song	Bilan	Pelageya	Gradsky	Agutin
Episode 9 (December 3, 2021)	Alexander Gradsky	1	«Звёздочка моя ясная»	Alisher Karimov	Viktor Kirillov	«Выхода нет»	—	✔	—N/a	—
Episode 9 (December 3, 2021)	Alexander Gradsky	1	«Звёздочка моя ясная»	Alisher Karimov	Yulia Kurganova	«Black Dog»	✔	Team full	—N/a	—
Episode 9 (December 3, 2021)	Leonid Agutin	2	«Сияй»	Yuri Navrotskiy	Tamara Kutidze	«Я женщина»	Team full	Team full	—	—N/a
Episode 9 (December 3, 2021)	Leonid Agutin	2	«Сияй»	Yuri Navrotskiy	Ivan Kharkovskiy	«Lonely No More»	Team full	Team full	—	—N/a
Episode 9 (December 3, 2021)	Dima Bilan	3	«Русское поле»	Ilkhom Tagirov	Nikita Bysyuk	«Happier Than Ever»	Team full	Team full	—	—
Episode 9 (December 3, 2021)	Dima Bilan	3	«Русское поле»	Ilkhom Tagirov	Adilet Zhumabekov	«Урга»	Team full	Team full	—	—
Episode 9 (December 3, 2021)	Pelageya	4	«Полонез» / «Why Worry»	Alexandr Volkodav	Aliy Tlyunyaev	«Isn't She Lovely?»	Team full	Team full	—	—
Episode 9 (December 3, 2021)	Pelageya	4	«Полонез» / «Why Worry»	Alexandr Volkodav	Svetlana Malyutkina	«Память»	Team full	Team full	—	—
Episode 10 (December 10, 2021)	Pelageya	1	«Bring Me to Life»	Yulia Koshkina	Darya Kopeykina	«Три зимы»	Team full	Team full	—	—
Episode 10 (December 10, 2021)	Pelageya	1	«Bring Me to Life»	Yulia Koshkina	Yulia Plaksina	«I'm Outta Love»	Team full	Team full	—	—
Episode 10 (December 10, 2021)	Alexander Gradsky	2	«Архангельский свадебный плач»	Tatyana Kachurina	Miroslava Kocheva	«They Won't Go When I Go»	Team full	Team full	—N/a	—
Episode 10 (December 10, 2021)	Alexander Gradsky	2	«Архангельский свадебный плач»	Tatyana Kachurina	Roman Grafov	«Kiss»	Team full	Team full	—N/a	—
Episode 10 (December 10, 2021)	Leonid Agutin	3	«Непобедимый»	Vyacheslav Yavkin	Alexandr Li	«Радовать»	Team full	Team full	—	—N/a
Episode 10 (December 10, 2021)	Leonid Agutin	3	«Непобедимый»	Vyacheslav Yavkin	Karina Kuper	«I'm Your Baby Tonight»	Team full	Team full	✔	—N/a
Episode 10 (December 10, 2021)	Dima Bilan	4	«Melodramma»	Ernar Sadirbaev	Maxim Yudin	«Беги от меня»	Team full	Team full	Team full	—
Episode 10 (December 10, 2021)	Dima Bilan	4	«Melodramma»	Ernar Sadirbaev	Elina Pan	«Монолог»	Team full	Team full	Team full	✔

== Live shows ==
Colour key:

Artist was saved
Artist was eliminated

=== Week 1: Top 12 — Quarterfinal (December 17) ===
The Live Top 12 Quarterfinal comprised episode 11. The top twelve artists performed, with two artists from each team advancing based on the sum of the viewers' and coach's votes. In the case of Gradsky's death, the two people from his team with the most public votes will advance into the semi-final.

Episode	Coach	Order	Artist	Song	Coach's vote (/100%)	Public's vote (/100%)	Votes' sum	Result
Episode 11 (December 17)	Alexander Gradsky	1	Karina Kuper	«Hero»	—N/a	10,1%		Eliminated
Episode 11 (December 17)	Alexander Gradsky	2	Alisher Karimov	«Необыкновенные глаза»	—N/a	35,3%		Advanced
Episode 11 (December 17)	Alexander Gradsky	3	Tatyana Kachurina	«Нежность»	—N/a	54,6%		Advanced
Episode 11 (December 17)	Dima Bilan	4	Ernar Sadirbaev	«Посредине лета»	50%	39,2%	89,2%	Advanced
Episode 11 (December 17)	Dima Bilan	5	Yulia Kurganova	«Посмотри в глаза»	20%	20,5%	40,5%	Eliminated
Episode 11 (December 17)	Dima Bilan	6	Ilkhom Tagirov	«Love is a Temple»	30%	40,3%	70,3%	Advanced
Episode 11 (December 17)	Pelageya	7	Alexandr Volkodav	«Oh, Pretty Woman»	50%	24,4%	74,4%	Advanced
Episode 11 (December 17)	Pelageya	8	Yulia Koshkina	«Я любила сокола»	30%	54,3%	84,3%	Advanced
Episode 11 (December 17)	Pelageya	9	Viktor Kirillov	«Свеча горела на столе...»	20%	21,3%	41,3%	Eliminated
Episode 11 (December 17)	Leonid Agutin	10	Yuri Navrotsky	«Паранойя»	20%	10,4%	30,4%	Eliminated
Episode 11 (December 17)	Leonid Agutin	11	Elina Pan	«Quédate Conmigo»	30%	51,7%	81,7%	Advanced
Episode 11 (December 17)	Leonid Agutin	12	Vyacheslav Yavkin	«Новый год»	50%	37,9%	87,9%	Advanced

=== Week 2: Top 8 — Semifinal (December 24) ===
The top eight artists performed on December 24, 2021, with one artist from each team advancing to the Final based on the sum of the viewers' and coach's votes

Episode	Coach	Order	Artist	Song	Coach's vote (/100%)	Public's vote (/100%)	Votes' sum	Result
Episode 12 (December 25)	Dima Bilan	1	Ilkhom Tagirov	«Let It Snow!»	40%	31,5%	71,5%	Eliminated
Episode 12 (December 25)	Dima Bilan	2	Ernar Sadirbaev	«Подберу музыку»	60%	68,5%	128,5%	Votes' summa
Episode 12 (December 25)	Pelageya	3	Alexandr Volkodav	«Чёрный ворон»	60%	48,4%	108,4%	Votes' summa
Episode 12 (December 25)	Pelageya	4	Yulia Koshkina	«Summer Moved On»	40%	51,6%	91,6%	Eliminated
Episode 12 (December 25)	Alexander Gradsky	5	Tatyana Kachurina	«Во лугах»	—N/a	48%		Eliminated
Episode 12 (December 25)	Alexander Gradsky	6	Alisher Karimov	«Я тебя никогда не забуду»	—N/a	52%		Votes' summa
Episode 12 (December 25)	Leonid Agutin	7	Vyacheslav Yavkin	«Stayin' Alive»	60%	34,3%	94,3%	Eliminated
Episode 12 (December 25)	Leonid Agutin	8	Elina Pan	«Thank You for the Music»	40%	65,7%	105,7%	Votes' summa

Non-competition performances
Order	Performer	Song
12.1	Larisa Dolina, Ilkhom Tagirov and Ernar Sadirbaev	«Не надо слов»
12.2	Sergei Trofimov, Alexandr Volkodav and Yulia Koshkina	«Ветер в голове»
12.3	Aleksandra Vorobyova, Tatyana Kachurina and Alisher Karimov	«Never Enough»
12.4	Anzhelika Varum, Vyacheslav Yavkin and Elina Pan	«Это всё для тебя»

=== Week 3: Final (December 30) ===
As like the previous seasons, the winner will be determined through public votes alone. The artist with the highest percentage of votes will be declared as the winner.

Alexandr Volkodav was announced the winner, marking Pelageya's first win as a coach after five attempts. Pelageya became the first coach in the history of the Russian Voice who won all versions of the show and third coach (following Sarah Geronimo and Lea Salonga, both from the Phlilippine version) in all franchises of the Voice around the world that managed to win in three different versions of The Voice (winning the fifth season of The Voice Kids and in the first two seasons of The Voice Senior).

Episode	Coach	Artist	Order	Duet Song (with Coach)	Order	Solo Song (no.1)	Order	Solo Song (no.2)	Result	
Episode 13 (December 30)
Episode 13 (December 30)	Leonid Agutin	Elina Pan	1	"Включите свет"	5	"Любовь, похожая на сон"	Eliminated		Fourth place	
Episode 13 (December 30)	Dima Bilan	Ernar Sadirbaev	2	"Ты должна рядом быть"	6	"Ищу тебя"	9	"Unchained Melody"	Third place	
Episode 13 (December 30)	Pelageya	Alexandr Volkodav	3	"Arcade"	7	"Казачья"	10	"Серенада трубадура"	Winner	53,3%
Episode 13 (December 30)	Alexander Gradsky	Alisher Karimov	4	"Как молоды мы были"	8	"Ноктюрн"	11	"Ave Maria"	Second place	46,7%
