= Sergei Volchkov (singer) =

Russian-Belarusian singer (born 1988)

Sergei Volchkov Russian: Сергей Волчков Belarusian: Сяргей Ваўчкоў
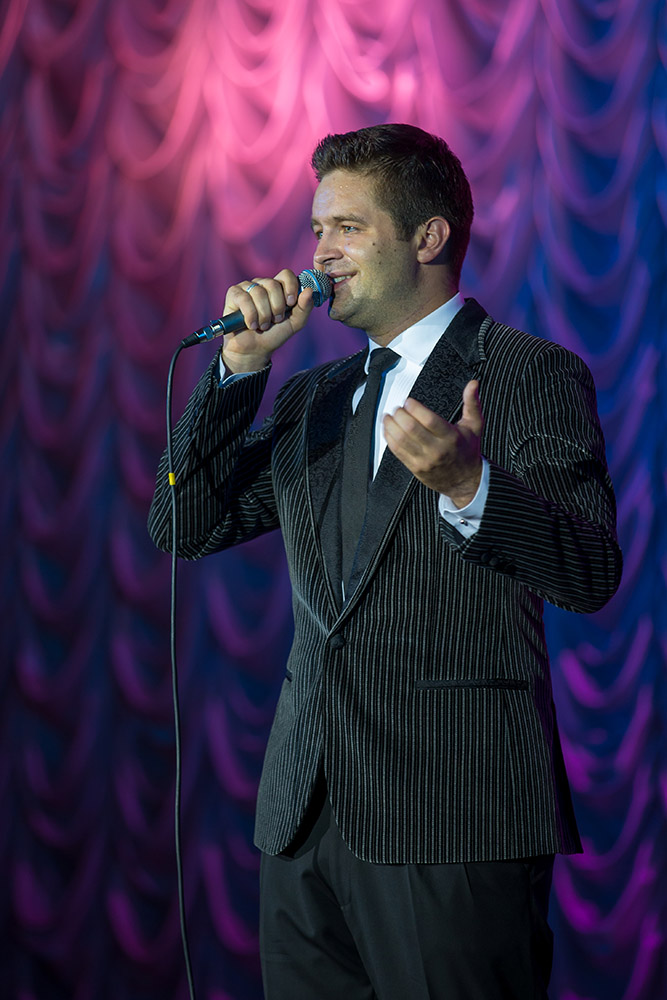
- Sergei Volchkov, 2014
- Born: Sergei Valeryevich Volchkov; 3 April 1988; Bykhaw, Mahilyow Voblasts, Belarus
- Occupations: Singer, musician
- Musical career
- Genres: Pop music, Romance, Opera
- Instrument: Vocals
- Label: Universal Music Russia
- Website: http://volchkovsergey.ru/

Sergei Valeryevich Volchkov (Russian: Сергей Валерьевич Волчков, Belarusian: Сяргей Валер'евіч Ваўчкоў, Syarhei Valeryevich Vawchkow; born 3 April 1988 in Bychaŭ, Byelorussian SSR, USSR) is a Belarusian singer who lives and works in Russia.

== Biography ==
=== 2013: Golos ===
On 27 December 2013 he won the Russian reality television singing competition Golos, based on The Voice series, with the other finalist Nargiz Zakirova coming as runner-up. In the final round he got 75% of votes.

He works in the "Gradsky Hall".

== Personal life ==
He currently lives in Moscow, is married and has daughter Ksenia (born 2014). He is Russian Orthodox Christian.

Preceded by Dina Garipova	Winner of Golos; 2013	Succeeded by Alexandra Vorobyova
