= Gela Guralia =

Georgian singer, tenor-altino (born 1980)

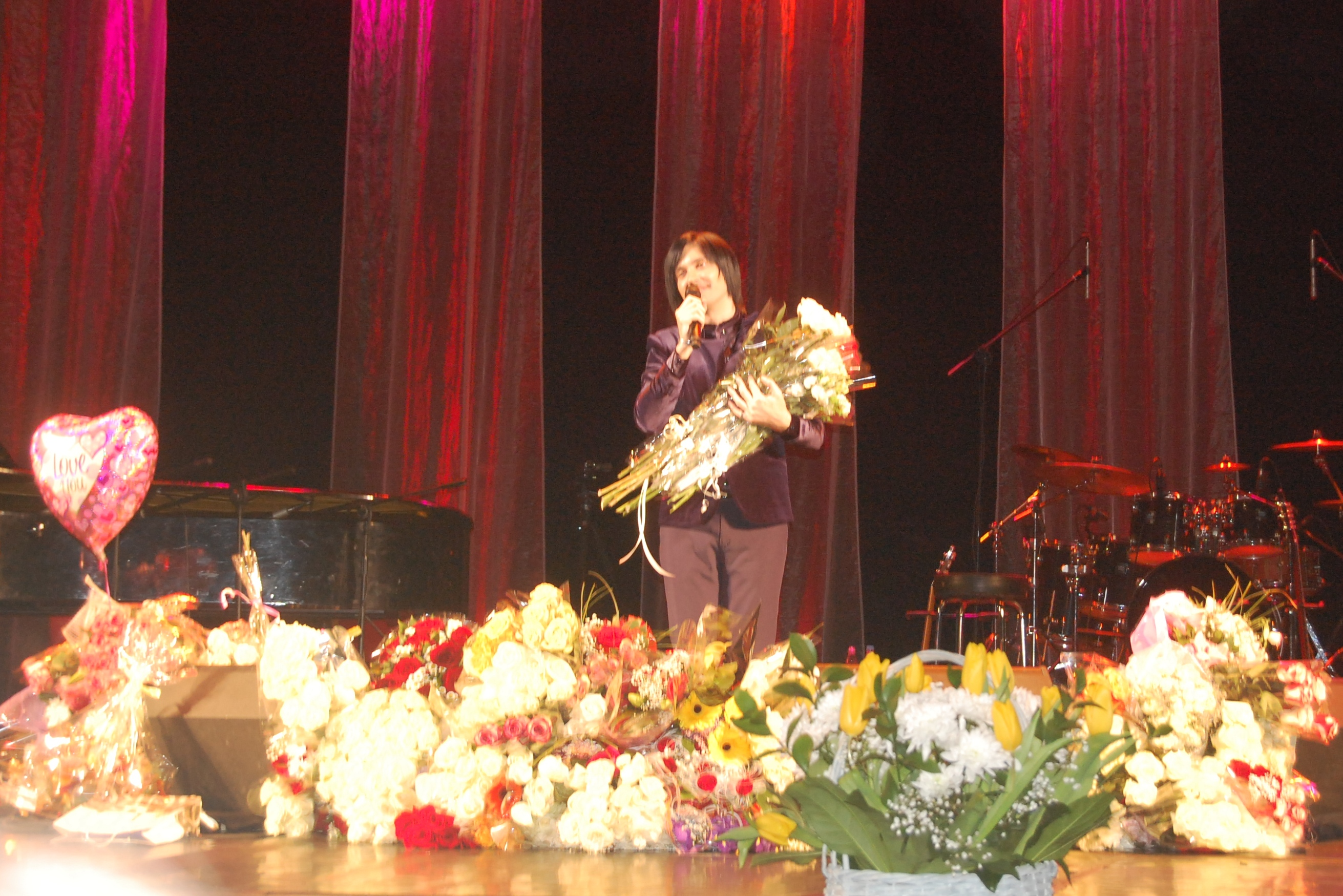
- Gela Guralia, 2014. St.Petersburg, Russia

Background information
- Born: Gela Guralia (Georgian: გელა გურალია); 22 December 1980 (age 45)
- Origin: Poti, Georgian SSR, USSR
- Genres: Pop
- Occupation: Singer

Gela Guralia (Georgian: გელა გურალია; Russian: Гела Гуралиа) is a Georgian singer, tenor-altino. In 2013, Guralia took third place in the Russian edition of the TV singing contest The Voice, Golos.

== Life and career ==
=== Early life and career ===
Gela Guralia was born in 1980 in Poti, Georgian SSR. He started singing at the age of five, participated in several local ensembles and then in a church choir. He studied piano, voice and acting at the Art School of Poti.

In school, Guralia developed interest in chemistry and, after graduating from high school, enrolled in a Chemistry degree at Tbilisi State University. In 2003, in light of an opportunity of becoming a professional singer, he moved to Moscow, Russia.

Guralia started his career as a singer in a restaurant in Moscow. He took part in the International Music Festival "Songs of the World" in Moldova in 2005 and then in the Russian "Golden Voice" contest in 2006, winning Audience Awards in both competitions.

=== TV show Golos ===
Guralia gained popularity in Russia after his appearance in the Russian edition of the TV singing contest The Voice, Golos, in 2013. The show attracted more than 10,000 applications, and only 150 singers were pre-selected for blind auditions. During blind auditions, one of the four mentors, Dima Bilan, selected Guralia into his team. Since the beginning of the show, Gela Guralia was among the favorites. He was one of the four finalists of the show and, as an outcome of the SMS voting attracting more than a million votes, he took third place in the final.

=== After the show ===
Guralia started his first solo concert tour in March 2014. The tour was a major success receiving enthusiastic reviews from critics and selling out in many cities in Russia. The final 33rd concert of the tour took place at the State Kremlin Palace Concert Hall in Moscow, the most prestigious concert stage of the country.

On 18 November 2014, the debut album of Gela Guralia was released. The leading song of the album, "Dream of Me", is written by Jud Friedman, a songwriter with several Oscar, Golden Globe and Grammy nominations for songs such as "Run to you" performed by Whitney Houston.

== Discography ==
=== Album ===
- Dream of Me (2014)

=== Music video ===
- Dream of Me (2014)
- You Know (2015)
- To the East (2018)
