= Semyonovka, Russia =

Semyonovka (Russian: Семёновка) is the name of several rural localities in Russia.

== Modern localities ==
=== Altai Krai ===
As of 2014, four rural localities in Altai Krai bear this name:

Altai Krai distribution map
Distribution of the inhabited localities called Semyonovka in Altai Krai.
- Semyonovka, Slavgorod, Altai Krai, a selo under the administrative jurisdiction of the town of krai significance of Slavgorod; 53°05′N 78°59′E
- Semyonovka, Krasnoshchyokovsky District, Altai Krai, a settlement in Krasnoshchekovsky Selsoviet of Krasnoshchyokovsky District; 51°34′N 82°45′E
- Semyonovka, Kulundinsky District, Altai Krai, a selo in Semyonovsky Selsoviet of Kulundinsky District; 52°33′N 79°19′E
- Semyonovka, Tretyakovsky District, Altai Krai, a settlement in Shipunikhinsky Selsoviet of Tretyakovsky District; 50°58′N 82°29′E

=== Amur Oblast ===
As of 2014, two rural localities in Amur Oblast bear this name:

Amur Oblast distribution map
Distribution of the inhabited localities called Semyonovka in Amur Oblast.
- Semyonovka, Bureysky District, Amur Oblast, a selo in Rodionovsky Rural Settlement of Bureysky District; 50°04′N 29°49′E
- Semyonovka, Svobodnensky District, Amur Oblast, a selo in Semyonovsky Rural Settlement of Svobodnensky District; 51°32′N 27°46′E

=== Republic of Bashkortostan ===
As of 2014, two rural localities in the Republic of Bashkortostan bear this name:

Republic of Bashkortostan distribution map
Distribution of the inhabited localities called Semyonovka in the Republic of Bashkortostan.
- Semyonovka, Chishminsky District, Republic of Bashkortostan, a village in Yengalyshevsky Selsoviet of Chishminsky District; 54°27′N 55°45′E
- Semyonovka, Meleuzovsky District, Republic of Bashkortostan, a village in Zirgansky Selsoviet of Meleuzovsky District; 53°16′N 55°52′E

=== Belgorod Oblast ===
As of 2014, one rural locality in Belgorod Oblast bears this name:

Belgorod Oblast location map
Location of Semyonovka in Belgorod Oblast
- Semyonovka, Belgorod Oblast, a selo in Novooskolsky District; 50°52′N 38°09′E

=== Bryansk Oblast ===
As of 2014, five rural localities in Bryansk Oblast bear this name:

Bryansk Oblast distribution map
Distribution of the inhabited localities called Semyonovka in Bryansk Oblast.
- Semyonovka, Karachevsky District, Bryansk Oblast, a village in Dronovsky Rural Administrative Okrug of Karachevsky District; 53°04′N 35°17′E
- Semyonovka, Mglinsky District, Bryansk Oblast, a settlement in Belovodsky Rural Administrative Okrug of Mglinsky District; 53°05′N 32°45′E
- Semyonovka, Rognedinsky District, Bryansk Oblast, a village in Voronovsky Rural Administrative Okrug of Rognedinsky District; 53°43′N 33°44′E
- Semyonovka, Sevsky District, Bryansk Oblast, a village in Novoyamsky Rural Administrative Okrug of Sevsky District; 52°12′N 34°34′E
- Semyonovka, Vygonichsky District, Bryansk Oblast, a settlement in Ormensky Rural Administrative Okrug of Vygonichsky District; 53°05′N 33°42′E

=== Republic of Buryatia ===
As of 2014, one rural locality in the Republic of Buryatia bears this name:

Republic of Buryatia location map
Location of Semyonovka in the Republic of Buryatia
- Semyonovka, Republic of Buryatia, a selo in Kudarinsky Somon of Kyakhtinsky District; 50°09′N 07°20′E

=== Chelyabinsk Oblast ===
As of 2014, one rural locality in Chelyabinsk Oblast bears this name:

Chelyabinsk Oblast location map
Location of Semyonovka in Chelyabinsk Oblast
- Semyonovka, Chelyabinsk Oblast, a village in Oktyabrsky Selsoviet of Oktyabrsky District; 54°22′N 62°37′E

=== Chuvash Republic ===
As of 2014, one rural locality in the Chuvash Republic bears this name:

Chuvash Republic location map
Location of Semyonovka in the Chuvash Republic
- Semyonovka, Chuvash Republic, a village in Askhvinskoye Rural Settlement of Kanashsky District; 55°31′N 47°21′E

=== Republic of Crimea ===
As of 2014, one rural locality in the Republic of Crimea bears this name:

- Semyonovka, Republic of Crimea, a selo in Leninsky District

=== Kaluga Oblast ===
As of 2014, one rural locality in Kaluga Oblast bears this name:

- Semyonovka, Kaluga Oblast, a selo in Peremyshlsky District

=== Krasnodar Krai ===
As of 2014, three rural localities in Krasnodar Krai bear this name:

Krasnodar Krai distribution map
Distribution of the inhabited localities called Semyonovka in Krasnodar Krai.
- Semyonovka, Sochi, Krasnodar Krai, a selo in Razdolsky Rural Okrug under the administrative jurisdiction of Khostinsky City District of the City of Sochi; 43°39′N 39°52′E
- Semyonovka, Kushchyovsky District, Krasnodar Krai, a khutor in Razdolnensky Rural Okrug of Kushchyovsky District; 46°40′N 39°44′E
- Semyonovka, Ust-Labinsky District, Krasnodar Krai, a khutor in Alexandrovsky Rural Okrug of Ust-Labinsky District; 45°20′N 40°03′E

=== Krasnoyarsk Krai ===
As of 2014, two rural localities in Krasnoyarsk Krai bear this name:

- Semyonovka, Dzerzhinsky District, Krasnoyarsk Krai, a village in Nizhnetanaysky Selsoviet of Dzerzhinsky District
- Semyonovka, Uyarsky District, Krasnoyarsk Krai, a village in Sushinovsky Selsoviet of Uyarsky District

=== Kursk Oblast ===
As of 2014, ten rural localities in Kursk Oblast bear this name:

- Semyonovka, Kastorensky District, Kursk Oblast, a selo in Semyonovsky Selsoviet of Kastorensky District
- Semyonovka, Konyshyovsky District, Kursk Oblast, a village in Platavsky Selsoviet of Konyshyovsky District
- Semyonovka, Lebyazhensky Selsoviet, Kursky District, Kursk Oblast, a village in Lebyazhensky Selsoviet of Kursky District
- Semyonovka, Shchetinsky Selsoviet, Kursky District, Kursk Oblast, a village in Shchetinsky Selsoviet of Kursky District
- Semyonovka, Lgovsky District, Kursk Oblast, a village in Krombykovsky Selsoviet of Lgovsky District
- Semyonovka, Oboyansky District, Kursk Oblast, a selo in Zorinsky Selsoviet of Oboyansky District
- Semyonovka, Shchigrovsky District, Kursk Oblast, a village in Vishnevsky Selsoviet of Shchigrovsky District
- Semyonovka, Shumakovsky Selsoviet, Solntsevsky District, Kursk Oblast, a village in Shumakovsky Selsoviet of Solntsevsky District
- Semyonovka, Vorobyevsky Selsoviet, Solntsevsky District, Kursk Oblast, a village in Vorobyevsky Selsoviet of Solntsevsky District
- Semyonovka, Sudzhansky District, Kursk Oblast, a village in Vorobzhansky Selsoviet of Sudzhansky District

=== Lipetsk Oblast ===
As of 2014, two rural localities in Lipetsk Oblast bear this name:

Lipetsk Oblast distribution map
Distribution of the inhabited localities called Semyonovka in Lipetsk Oblast.
- Semyonovka, Volovsky District, Lipetsk Oblast, a village in Naberezhansky Selsoviet of Volovsky District; 51°57′N 38°11′E
- Semyonovka, Zadonsky District, Lipetsk Oblast, a village in Kalabinsky Selsoviet of Zadonsky District; 52°12′N 38°40′E

=== Mari El Republic ===
As of 2014, four rural localities in the Mari El Republic bear this name:

Mari El Republic distribution map
Distribution of the inhabited localities called Semyonovka in the Mari El Republic.
- Semyonovka, Yoshkar-Ola, Mari El Republic, a selo under the administrative jurisdiction of the city of republic significance of Yoshkar-Ola; 56°39′N 47°58′E
- Semyonovka, Mari-Tureksky District, Mari El Republic, a village in Khlebnikovsky Rural Okrug of Mari-Tureksky District; 56°37′N 50°01′E
- Semyonovka, Sovetsky District, Mari El Republic, a village in Mikhaylovsky Rural Okrug of Sovetsky District; 56°41′N 48°20′E
- Semyonovka, Zvenigovsky District, Mari El Republic, a village in Kokshaysky Rural Okrug of Zvenigovsky District; 56°08′N 47°52′E

=== Republic of Mordovia ===
As of 2014, four rural localities in the Republic of Mordovia bear this name:

Republic of Mordovia distribution map
Distribution of the inhabited localities called Semyonovka in the Republic of Mordovia.
- Semyonovka, Chamzinsky District, Republic of Mordovia, a village in Apraksinsky Selsoviet of Chamzinsky District; 54°31′N 45°47′E
- Semyonovka, Insarsky District, Republic of Mordovia, a village in Yazykovo-Pyatinsky Selsoviet of Insarsky District; 53°45′N 44°35′E
- Semyonovka, Temnikovsky District, Republic of Mordovia, a settlement in Alexeyevsky Selsoviet of Temnikovsky District; 54°37′N 43°05′E
- Semyonovka, Torbeyevsky District, Republic of Mordovia, a village in Mordovsko-Yunkinsky Selsoviet of Torbeyevsky District; 54°09′N 43°24′E

=== Nizhny Novgorod Oblast ===
As of 2014, one rural locality in Nizhny Novgorod Oblast bears this name:

Nizhny Novgorod Oblast location map
Location of Semyonovka in Nizhny Novgorod Oblast
- Semyonovka, Nizhny Novgorod Oblast, a selo in Semyonovsky Selsoviet of Krasnooktyabrsky District; 55°27′N 45°35′E

=== Omsk Oblast ===
As of 2014, two rural localities in Omsk Oblast bear this name:

Omsk Oblast distribution map
Distribution of the inhabited localities called Semyonovka in Omsk Oblast.
- Semyonovka, Kalachinsky District, Omsk Oblast, a village in Velikorussky Rural Okrug of Kalachinsky District; 54°38′N 74°32′E
- Semyonovka, Znamensky District, Omsk Oblast, a selo in Semyonovsky Rural Okrug of Znamensky District; 57°09′N 73°45′E

=== Orenburg Oblast ===
As of 2014, two rural localities in Orenburg Oblast bear this name:

- Semyonovka, Kurmanayevsky District, Orenburg Oblast, a selo in Volzhsky Selsoviet of Kurmanayevsky District
- Semyonovka, Ponomaryovsky District, Orenburg Oblast, a selo in Semyonovsky Selsoviet of Ponomaryovsky District

=== Oryol Oblast ===
As of 2014, three rural localities in Oryol Oblast bear this name:

Oryol Oblast distribution map
Distribution of the inhabited localities called Semyonovka in Oryol Oblast.
- Semyonovka, Maloarkhangelsky District, Oryol Oblast, a village in Podgorodnensky Selsoviet of Maloarkhangelsky District; 52°23′N 36°23′E
- Semyonovka, Shablykinsky District, Oryol Oblast, a selo in Khotkovsky Selsoviet of Shablykinsky District; 52°59′N 35°18′E
- Semyonovka, Verkhovsky District, Oryol Oblast, a village in Galichinsky Selsoviet of Verkhovsky District; 52°46′N 37°15′E

=== Pskov Oblast ===
As of 2014, one rural locality in Pskov Oblast bears this name:

- Semyonovka, Pskov Oblast, a village in Nevelsky District

=== Rostov Oblast ===
As of 2014, three rural localities in Rostov Oblast bear this name:

Rostov Oblast distribution map
Distribution of the inhabited localities called Semyonovka in Rostov Oblast.
- Semyonovka, Kasharsky District, Rostov Oblast, a khutor in Popovskoye Rural Settlement of Kasharsky District; 49°17′N 41°23′E
- Semyonovka, Milyutinsky District, Rostov Oblast, a khutor in Mankovo-Berezovskoye Rural Settlement of Milyutinsky District; 48°48′N 41°35′E
- Semyonovka, Morozovsky District, Rostov Oblast, a khutor in Volno-Donskoye Rural Settlement of Morozovsky District; 48°19′N 41°41′E

=== Ryazan Oblast ===
As of 2014, one rural locality in Ryazan Oblast bears this name:

- Semyonovka, Ryazan Oblast, a village under the administrative jurisdiction of Kadom Work Settlement in Kadomsky District

=== Samara Oblast ===
As of 2014, three rural localities in Samara Oblast bear this name:

- Semyonovka, Novokuybyshevsk, Samara Oblast, a settlement under the administrative jurisdiction of the city of oblast significance of Novokuybyshevsk
- Semyonovka, Kinel-Cherkassky District, Samara Oblast, a selo in Kinel-Cherkassky District
- Semyonovka, Neftegorsky District, Samara Oblast, a selo in Neftegorsky District

=== Saratov Oblast ===
As of 2014, four rural localities in Saratov Oblast bear this name:

- Semyonovka, Arkadaksky District, Saratov Oblast, a selo in Arkadaksky District
- Semyonovka, Fyodorovsky District, Saratov Oblast, a selo in Fyodorovsky District
- Semyonovka, Krasnopartizansky District, Saratov Oblast, a selo in Krasnopartizansky District
- Semyonovka, Marksovsky District, Saratov Oblast, a selo in Marksovsky District

=== Smolensk Oblast ===
As of 2014, three rural localities in Smolensk Oblast bear this name:

- Semyonovka, Demidovsky District, Smolensk Oblast, a village in Titovshchinskoye Rural Settlement of Demidovsky District
- Semyonovka, Roslavlsky District, Smolensk Oblast, a village in Lyubovskoye Rural Settlement of Roslavlsky District
- Semyonovka, Yershichsky District, Smolensk Oblast, a village in Rukhanskoye Rural Settlement of Yershichsky District

=== Stavropol Krai ===
As of 2014, one rural locality in Stavropol Krai bears this name:

- Semyonovka, Stavropol Krai, a settlement in Shaumyanovsky Selsoviet of Georgiyevsky District

=== Tambov Oblast ===
As of 2014, four rural localities in Tambov Oblast bear this name:

- Semyonovka, Inzhavinsky District, Tambov Oblast, a selo in Nikitinsky Selsoviet of Inzhavinsky District
- Semyonovka, Petrovsky District, Tambov Oblast, a selo in Petrovsky Selsoviet of Petrovsky District
- Semyonovka, Rzhaksinsky District, Tambov Oblast, a selo in Bolsherzhaksinsky Selsoviet of Rzhaksinsky District
- Semyonovka, Tokaryovsky District, Tambov Oblast, a selo in Abakumovsky Selsoviet of Tokaryovsky District

=== Tomsk Oblast ===
As of 2014, one rural locality in Tomsk Oblast bears this name:

- Semyonovka, Tomsk Oblast, a selo in Zyryansky District

=== Tula Oblast ===
As of 2014, three rural localities in Tula Oblast bear this name:

- Semyonovka, Dubensky District, Tula Oblast, a village in Gvardeysky Rural Okrug of Dubensky District
- Semyonovka, Leninsky District, Tula Oblast, a village in Rozhdestvensky Rural Okrug of Leninsky District
- Semyonovka, Volovsky District, Tula Oblast, a village in Baskakovsky Rural Okrug of Volovsky District

=== Ulyanovsk Oblast ===
As of 2014, one rural locality in Ulyanovsk Oblast bears this name:

- Semyonovka, Ulyanovsk Oblast, a village in Timiryazevsky Rural Okrug of Ulyanovsky District

=== Vladimir Oblast ===
As of 2014, two rural localities in Vladimir Oblast bear this name:

- Semyonovka, Gorokhovetsky District, Vladimir Oblast, a village in Gorokhovetsky District
- Semyonovka, Gus-Khrustalny District, Vladimir Oblast, a village in Gus-Khrustalny District

=== Volgograd Oblast ===
As of 2014, three rural localities in Volgograd Oblast bear this name:

- Semyonovka, Dubovsky District, Volgograd Oblast, a selo in Ust-Pogozhinsky Selsoviet of Dubovsky District
- Semyonovka, Kamyshinsky District, Volgograd Oblast, a selo in Semyonovsky Selsoviet of Kamyshinsky District
- Semyonovka, Kikvidzensky District, Volgograd Oblast, a selo in Semyonovsky Selsoviet of Kikvidzensky District

=== Voronezh Oblast ===
As of 2014, two rural localities in Voronezh Oblast bear this name:

- Semyonovka, Kalacheyevsky District, Voronezh Oblast, a selo in Semyonovskoye Rural Settlement of Kalacheyevsky District
- Semyonovka, Verkhnekhavsky District, Voronezh Oblast, a selo in Semyonovskoye Rural Settlement of Verkhnekhavsky District

=== Yaroslavl Oblast ===
As of 2014, two rural localities in Yaroslavl Oblast bear this name:

- Semyonovka, Breytovsky District, Yaroslavl Oblast, a village in Ulyanovsky Rural Okrug of Breytovsky District
- Semyonovka, Pereslavsky District, Yaroslavl Oblast, a village in Aleksinsky Rural Okrug of Pereslavsky District

== Alternative names ==
- Semyonovka, alternative name of Semenovo, a village in Kenozersky Selsoviet of Plesetsky District in Arkhangelsk Oblast; 61°59′N 38°12′E
- Semyonovka, alternative name of Pribrezhny, a settlement in Zamyansky Selsoviet of Yenotayevsky District in Astrakhan Oblast; 46°51′N 47°36′E
- Semyonovka, alternative name of Semenkino, a selo in Semenkinsky Selsoviet of Aurgazinsky District in the Republic of Bashkortostan; 53°49′N 55°42′E
- Semyonovka, alternative name of Plekhanovo, a selo in Plekhanovsky Selsoviet of Gryazinsky District in Lipetsk Oblast; 52°38′N 39°51′E
- Semyonovka, alternative name of Semyanovka, a village in Loginovsky Rural Okrug of Pavlogradsky District in Omsk Oblast; 54°16′N 73°45′E

== Historical names ==
- Semyonovka, name of the town of Arsenyev in Primorsky Krai from 1895 to 1952
