= Yekaterinovka, Russia =

Name of several Russian rural localities

Yekaterinovka (Russian: Екатери́новка) is the name of several inhabited localities in Russia.

== Altai Krai ==
As of 2010, two rural localities in Altai Krai bear this name:

- Yekaterinovka, Kulundinsky District, Altai Krai, a selo in Ananyevsky Selsoviet of Kulundinsky District
- Yekaterinovka, Slavgorodsky District, Altai Krai, a selo in Selektsionny Selsoviet of Slavgorodsky District

== Astrakhan Oblast ==
As of 2010, one rural locality in Astrakhan Oblast bears this name:

- Yekaterinovka, Astrakhan Oblast, a selo in Fedorovsky Selsoviet of Yenotayevsky District

== Republic of Bashkortostan ==
As of 2010, two rural localities in the Republic of Bashkortostan bear this name:

- Yekaterinovka, Belebeyevsky District, Republic of Bashkortostan, a village in Bazhenovsky Selsoviet of Belebeyevsky District
- Yekaterinovka, Ishimbaysky District, Republic of Bashkortostan, a village in Yanurusovsky Selsoviet of Ishimbaysky District

== Belgorod Oblast ==
As of 2010, one rural locality in Belgorod Oblast bears this name:

- Yekaterinovka, Belgorod Oblast, a khutor in Grushevsky Rural Okrug of Volokonovsky District

== Bryansk Oblast ==
As of 2010, one rural locality in Bryansk Oblast bears this name:

- Yekaterinovka, Bryansk Oblast, a settlement in Krasninsky Selsoviet of Brasovsky District

== Chelyabinsk Oblast ==
As of 2010, one rural locality in Chelyabinsk Oblast bears this name:

- Yekaterinovka, Chelyabinsk Oblast, a selo in Mesedinsky Selsoviet of Katav-Ivanovsky District

== Kaluga Oblast ==
As of 2010, five rural localities in Kaluga Oblast bear this name:

- Yekaterinovka, Spas-Demensky District, Kaluga Oblast, a village in Spas-Demensky District
- Yekaterinovka, Tarussky District, Kaluga Oblast, a village in Tarussky District
- Yekaterinovka (Chemodanovo Rural Settlement), Yukhnovsky District, Kaluga Oblast, a village in Yukhnovsky District; municipally, a part of Chemodanovo Rural Settlement of that district
- Yekaterinovka (Pogorelovka Rural Settlement), Yukhnovsky District, Kaluga Oblast, a village in Yukhnovsky District; municipally, a part of Pogorelovka Rural Settlement of that district
- Yekaterinovka, Zhukovsky District, Kaluga Oblast, a village in Zhukovsky District

== Krasnodar Krai ==
As of 2010, one rural locality in Krasnodar Krai bears this name:

- Yekaterinovka, Krasnodar Krai, a selo in Yekaterinovsky Rural Okrug of Shcherbinovsky District

== Krasnoyarsk Krai ==
As of 2010, one rural locality in Krasnoyarsk Krai bears this name:

- Yekaterinovka, Krasnoyarsk Krai, a selo in Yekaterininsky Selsoviet of Idrinsky District

== Kursk Oblast ==
As of 2010, six rural localities in Kursk Oblast bear this name:

- Yekaterinovka, Kursky District, Kursk Oblast, a village in Novoposelenovsky Selsoviet of Kursky District
- Yekaterinovka, Lgovsky District, Kursk Oblast, a village in Maleyevsky Selsoviet of Lgovsky District
- Yekaterinovka, Manturovsky District, Kursk Oblast, a village in Repetskoplatavsky Selsoviet of Manturovsky District
- Yekaterinovka, Krestishchensky Selsoviet, Sovetsky District, Kursk Oblast, a village in Krestishchensky Selsoviet of Sovetsky District
- Yekaterinovka, Natalyinsky Selsoviet, Sovetsky District, Kursk Oblast, a village in Natalyinsky Selsoviet of Sovetsky District
- Yekaterinovka, Sovetsky Selsoviet, Sovetsky District, Kursk Oblast, a village in Sovetsky Selsoviet of Sovetsky District

== Leningrad Oblast ==
As of 2010, one rural locality in Leningrad Oblast bears this name:

- Yekaterinovka, Leningrad Oblast, a village in Kuyvozovskoye Settlement Municipal Formation of Vsevolozhsky District

== Lipetsk Oblast ==
As of 2010, five rural localities in Lipetsk Oblast bear this name:

- Yekaterinovka, Dobrovsky District, Lipetsk Oblast, a selo in Yekaterinovsky Selsoviet of Dobrovsky District
- Yekaterinovka, Dolgorukovsky District, Lipetsk Oblast, a village in Dolgorukovsky Selsoviet of Dolgorukovsky District
- Yekaterinovka, Krasninsky District, Lipetsk Oblast, a village in Sukhodolsky Selsoviet of Krasninsky District
- Yekaterinovka, Usmansky District, Lipetsk Oblast, a selo in Breslavsky Selsoviet of Usmansky District
- Yekaterinovka, Yeletsky District, Lipetsk Oblast, a village in Bolsheizvalsky Selsoviet of Yeletsky District

== Republic of Mordovia ==
As of 2010, one rural locality in the Republic of Mordovia bears this name:

- Yekaterinovka, Republic of Mordovia, a village in Skryabinsky Selsoviet of Lyambirsky District

== Moscow Oblast ==
As of 2010, one rural locality in Moscow Oblast bears this name:

- Yekaterinovka, Moscow Oblast, a village in Nudolskoye Rural Settlement of Klinsky District

== Nizhny Novgorod Oblast ==
As of 2010, two rural localities in Nizhny Novgorod Oblast bear this name:

- Yekaterinovka, Krasnooktyabrsky District, Nizhny Novgorod Oblast, a village in Kechasovsky Selsoviet of Krasnooktyabrsky District
- Yekaterinovka, Sechenovsky District, Nizhny Novgorod Oblast, a village in Lipovsky Selsoviet of Sechenovsky District

== Omsk Oblast ==
As of 2010, three rural localities in Omsk Oblast bear this name:

- Yekaterinovka, Moskalensky District, Omsk Oblast, a selo in Yekaterinovsky Rural Okrug of Moskalensky District
- Yekaterinovka, Tevrizsky District, Omsk Oblast, a selo in Yekaterininsky Rural Okrug of Tevrizsky District
- Yekaterinovka, Ust-Ishimsky District, Omsk Oblast, a village in Nikolsky Rural Okrug of Ust-Ishimsky District

== Orenburg Oblast ==
As of 2010, five rural localities in Orenburg Oblast bear this name:

- Yekaterinovka, Buzuluksky District, Orenburg Oblast, a selo in Derzhavinsky Selsoviet of Buzuluksky District
- Yekaterinovka, Kvarkensky District, Orenburg Oblast, a selo in Krasnoyarsky Settlement Council of Kvarkensky District
- Yekaterinovka, Saraktashsky District, Orenburg Oblast, a selo in Kairovsky Selsoviet of Saraktashsky District
- Yekaterinovka, Sharlyksky District, Orenburg Oblast, a settlement in Ratchinsky Selsoviet of Sharlyksky District
- Yekaterinovka, Tyulgansky District, Orenburg Oblast, a selo in Blagodarnovsky Selsoviet of Tyulgansky District

== Oryol Oblast ==
As of 2010, two rural localities in Oryol Oblast bear this name:

- Yekaterinovka, Kolpnyansky District, Oryol Oblast, a village in Karlovsky Selsoviet of Kolpnyansky District
- Yekaterinovka, Livensky District, Oryol Oblast, a selo in Nikolsky Selsoviet of Livensky District

== Penza Oblast ==
As of 2010, one rural locality in Penza Oblast bears this name:

- Yekaterinovka, Penza Oblast, a selo in Zasursky Selsoviet of Luninsky District

== Perm Krai ==
As of 2010, one rural locality in Perm Krai bears this name:

- Yekaterinovka, Perm Krai, a village in Uinsky District

== Primorsky Krai ==
As of 2010, one rural locality in Primorsky Krai bears this name:

- Yekaterinovka, Primorsky Krai, a selo in Partizansky District

== Rostov Oblast ==
As of 2010, three rural localities in Rostov Oblast bear this name:

- Yekaterinovka, Matveyevo-Kurgansky District, Rostov Oblast, a selo in Yekaterinovskoye Rural Settlement of Matveyevo-Kurgansky District
- Yekaterinovka, Millerovsky District, Rostov Oblast, a khutor in Krivorozhskoye Rural Settlement of Millerovsky District
- Yekaterinovka, Salsky District, Rostov Oblast, a selo in Yekaterinovskoye Rural Settlement of Salsky District

== Ryazan Oblast ==
As of 2010, three rural localities in Ryazan Oblast bear this name:

- Yekaterinovka, Miloslavsky District, Ryazan Oblast, a village in Pryamoglyadovsky Rural Okrug of Miloslavsky District
- Yekaterinovka, Putyatinsky District, Ryazan Oblast, a selo in Yekaterinovsky Rural Okrug of Putyatinsky District
- Yekaterinovka, Sapozhkovsky District, Ryazan Oblast, a village in Korovkinsky Rural Okrug of Sapozhkovsky District

== Samara Oblast ==
As of 2010, five rural localities in Samara Oblast bear this name:

- Yekaterinovka, Bezenchuksky District, Samara Oblast, a selo in Bezenchuksky District
- Yekaterinovka, Kinel-Cherkassky District, Samara Oblast, a selo in Kinel-Cherkassky District
- Yekaterinovka (selo), Krasnoyarsky District, Samara Oblast, a selo in Krasnoyarsky District
- Yekaterinovka (village), Krasnoyarsky District, Samara Oblast, a village in Krasnoyarsky District
- Yekaterinovka, Privolzhsky District, Samara Oblast, a selo in Privolzhsky District

== Saratov Oblast ==
As of 2010, three inhabited localities in Saratov Oblast bear this name:

Urban localities

- Yekaterinovka, Yekaterinovsky District, Saratov Oblast, a work settlement in Yekaterinovsky District

Rural localities

- Yekaterinovka, Novoburassky District, Saratov Oblast, a village in Novoburassky District
- Yekaterinovka, Rtishchevsky District, Saratov Oblast, a village in Rtishchevsky District

== Smolensk Oblast ==
As of 2010, one rural locality in Smolensk Oblast bears this name:

- Yekaterinovka, Smolensk Oblast, a village in Tesovskoye Rural Settlement of Novoduginsky District

== Sverdlovsk Oblast ==
As of 2010, one rural locality in Sverdlovsk Oblast bears this name:

- Yekaterinovka, Sverdlovsk Oblast, a village in Krasnoufimsky District

== Tambov Oblast ==
As of 2010, four rural localities in Tambov Oblast bear this name:

- Yekaterinovka, Kirsanovsky District, Tambov Oblast, a village in Leninsky Selsoviet of Kirsanovsky District
- Yekaterinovka, Morshansky District, Tambov Oblast, a selo in Yekaterinovsky Selsoviet of Morshansky District
- Yekaterinovka, Pichayevsky District, Tambov Oblast, a village in Bolshelomovissky Selsoviet of Pichayevsky District
- Yekaterinovka, Umyotsky District, Tambov Oblast, a village in Bibikovsky Selsoviet of Umyotsky District

== Republic of Tatarstan ==
As of 2010, five rural localities in the Republic of Tatarstan bear this name:

- Yekaterinovka, Novosheshminsky District, Republic of Tatarstan, a village in Novosheshminsky District
- Yekaterinovka, Pestrechinsky District, Republic of Tatarstan, a selo in Pestrechinsky District
- Yekaterinovka, Spassky District, Republic of Tatarstan, a selo in Spassky District
- Yekaterinovka, Tyulyachinsky District, Republic of Tatarstan, a village in Tyulyachinsky District
- Yekaterinovka, Yutazinsky District, Republic of Tatarstan, a settlement in Yutazinsky District

== Tula Oblast ==
As of 2010, two rural localities in Tula Oblast bear this name:

- Yekaterinovka, Yasnogorsky District, Tula Oblast, a village in Burakovskaya Rural Territory of Yasnogorsky District
- Yekaterinovka, Yefremovsky District, Tula Oblast, a village in Bolsheplotavsky Rural Okrug of Yefremovsky District

== Tver Oblast ==
As of 2010, one rural locality in Tver Oblast bears this name:

- Yekaterinovka, Tver Oblast, a village in Kalyazinsky District

== Tyumen Oblast ==
As of 2010, one rural locality in Tyumen Oblast bears this name:

- Yekaterinovka, Tyumen Oblast, a village in Pervopesyanovsky Rural Okrug of Ishimsky District

== Ulyanovsk Oblast ==
As of 2010, four rural localities in Ulyanovsk Oblast bear this name:

- Yekaterinovka, Baryshsky District, Ulyanovsk Oblast, a village in Polivanovsky Rural Okrug of Baryshsky District
- Yekaterinovka, Inzensky District, Ulyanovsk Oblast, a village in Oskinsky Rural Okrug of Inzensky District
- Yekaterinovka, Kuzovatovsky District, Ulyanovsk Oblast, a selo in Speshnevsky Rural Okrug of Kuzovatovsky District
- Yekaterinovka, Sengileyevsky District, Ulyanovsk Oblast, a selo in Tushninsky Rural Okrug of Sengileyevsky District

== Vladimir Oblast ==
As of 2010, one rural locality in Vladimir Oblast bears this name:

- Yekaterinovka, Vladimir Oblast, a village in Selivanovsky District

== Voronezh Oblast ==
As of 2010, three rural localities in Voronezh Oblast bear this name:

- Yekaterinovka, Liskinsky District, Voronezh Oblast, a sloboda in Petrovskoye Rural Settlement of Liskinsky District
- Yekaterinovka, Repyovsky District, Voronezh Oblast, a khutor in Butyrskoye Rural Settlement of Repyovsky District
- Yekaterinovka, Rossoshansky District, Voronezh Oblast, a selo in Lizinovskoye Rural Settlement of Rossoshansky District
