= Anna Asti discography =

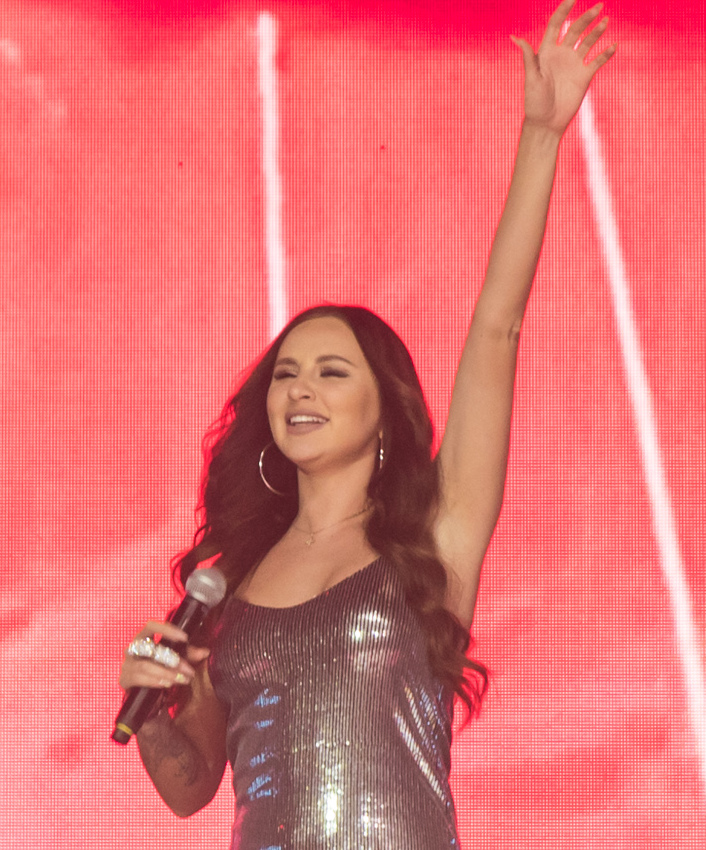
- Asti performing in 2018
- Studio albums: 3
- Singles: 14
- Music videos: 7

The discography of Russian singer Anna Asti includes three studio albums and fourteen singles.

At the end of 2021, Asti announced the beginning of her solo career. On 14 January 2022, she released her debut single "Feniks", which reached number 15 on Billboard's Russia Songs chart. In April 2022, the singer released a joint track with Philipp Kirkorov called "Khobbi". On 3 June 2022, the track "Po baram" was released and pre-order for the debut solo album Feniks was opened. It was released on 24 June 2022. On October 21, the track "Noch'yu na kukhne" was released, and on December 23, a cover of the song "Zvenit yanvarskaya vyuga" for the film Self-Irony of Fate. By the end of the year, Asti became one of the most popular artists in Russia on streaming platforms, the album Feniks and the single "Po baram" also became the leaders of various ratings. On 28 April 2023, the single "Veryu v tebya" was released. On July 14, the track "Tsaritsa" was released. On September 29, the release of the second album Tsaritsa took place. Both the track and the album became the most popular releases of the year, thanks to which Asti was again named the most popular artist according to some streaming services, including Yandex Music. On the chart-publishing platform TopHit, the singer took first place in the All Media rating in Russia. In 2024, the singer released the single "Topit", which entered the top three of the Russian Airplay chart, as well as "Ya khochu byt..." in collaboration with Igor Krutoy. On 30 May 2025, the release of the third studio album Vysshiye sily took place.

== Albums ==
Title	Album details	Peak chart positions		Certifications
Title	Album details	LAT	LTU	Certifications
Feniks	Released: 24 June 2022; Formats: Digital download	45	96	NFMI: 10× Platinum
Tsaritsa	Released: 29 September 2023; Label: Fenix Music; Formats: Digital download	1	4	
Vysshiye sily	Released: 30 May 2025; Label: Fenix Music; Formats: Digital download	*	—	
"—" denotes a recording that did not chart or was not released in that territory. "*" denotes the chart did not exist at that time.

== Singles ==
=== As lead artist ===
Title	Year	Peak chart positions										Certifications	Album
Title	Year	RUS Air.	RUS Stream. (Note: TopHit did not publish an official streaming chart for Russia before 2025. Therefore, for the song “Feniks”, the peak position in this column is taken from the Russian streaming and sales chart that was published by Billboard in 2022.)	BLR Air.	CIS Air.	EST Air.	KAZ Air.	LAT Air. (Note: No charts were published by the Latvian Music Producers Association between March 2021 and January 2023. As the association confirmed that it uses Radiomonitor data starting from January 2023, unavailable peak positions from the earlier period are also based on Radiomonitor data, but published directly by Radiomonitor. From January 2023, when both LaIPA and TopHit began publishing Latvian airplay charts, peak positions are taken from LaIPA where available; however, as not all of Asti’s singles charted on LaIPA while several peaked on TopHit, TopHit data are also taken into consideration from that date onward.)	LTU	LTU Air.	MDA Air.	Certifications	Album
"Feniks"	2022	71	15	*	80	*	*	—	—	*	121	NFMI: 9× Platinum	Feniks
"Khobbi" (with Philipp Kirkorov)	2022	28	*	*	40	*	*	15	—	*	42	NFMI: 7× Platinum	Feniks
"Po baram"	2022	11	39	39	19	*	11	—	—	141	4	NFMI: 8× Platinum	Feniks
"Nochyu na kukhne"	2022	15	*	33	19	87	3	9	—	189	1	NFMI: 3× Platinum	Tsaritsa
"Kak lyubov tvoyu ponyat?" (with Jony)	2022	59	*	173	94	63	*	16	49	*	6		Ne ishchite vo mne zhanry
"Zvenit yanvarskaya vyuga"	2022	66	49	*	109	70	*	1	—	2	—		Non-album single
"Veryu v tebya"	2023	45	*	105	60	35	50	60	—	4	—		Tsaritsa
"Tsaritsa"	2023	10	13	21	18	21	1	1	3	5	1		Tsaritsa
"Topit"	2024	3	21	15	7	95	3	12	—	5	6		Non-album single
"Ya khochu byt..." (with Igor Krutoy)	2024	74	*	—	144	—	—	109	—	4	—	NFMI: 6× Platinum	Igor Krutoy. 70
"Vysshiye sily"	2025	—	10	—	—	—	70	46	—	8	—		Vysshiye sily
"Groza"	2025	—	14	—	—	—	—	52	—	5	—		Vysshiye sily
"Plachu na tekhno"	2025	106	45	—	152	—	72	5	—	4	—		Non-album singles
"Epilog" (with Dima Bilan)	2026	21	16	126	26	—	4	25	—	—	—		Non-album singles
"NPC"	2026	—	19	—	—	—	—	—	—	—	—		Non-album singles
"—" denotes items which were not released in that country or failed to chart. "*" denotes the chart did not exist at that time.

=== As featured artist ===
Title	Year	Peak chart positions			Album
Title	Year	RUS Air.	UKR Air.	CIS Air.	Album
"Atom" (DJ Smash featuring Anna Asti)	2012	—	—	—	Novy mir
"Nebo" (GeeGun featuring Anna Asti)	2013	—	168	—	Muzyka. Zhizn.
"Zatseluyu" (DJ Noiz featuring Anna Asti)	2014	—	—	—	Non-album single
"Moy mir" (GeeGun featuring Anna Asti)	2015	—	—	—	Tvoy vybor
"Vsyo budet khorosho" (GeeGun featuring Anna Asti)	2016	182	—	176	Dzhiga
"Otpusti" (Black Bros. featuring Anna Asti)	2016	—	—	—	12
"—" denotes items which were not released in that country or failed to chart.

== Other charted songs ==
Title	Year	Peak chart positions									Album
Title	Year	RUS Air.	RUS Stream.	BLR Air.	CIS Air.	EST Air.	KAZ Air.	LAT Air.	LTU Air.	MDA Air.	Album
"Povelo"	2022	5	*	42	12	97	1	23	—	21	Feniks
"Tseluyesh druguyu"	2022	—	*	—	—	—	—	—	85	—	Feniks
"Kosmicheski"	2023	—	*	—	—	—	—	—	8	—	Tsaritsa
"Durak"	2023	61	*	—	95	53	—	—	—	—	Tsaritsa
"Predannyy byvshiy"	2025	14	21	26	22	—	1	63	42	27	Vysshiye sily
"Zalechi"	2025	—	81	—	—	—	—	—	—	—	Vysshiye sily
"Chtoby ty tozhe"	2025	—	48	—	—	—	—	45	—	—	Vysshiye sily
"—" denotes items which were not released in that country or failed to chart. "*" denotes the chart did not exist at that time.

== Music videos ==
Year	Title	Director
2022	"Feniks"	Alexey Good
2022	"Khobbi"	Alexey Good
2022	"Po baram"	Vasiliy Kozar
2022	"Kak lyubov tvoyu ponyat?" (with Jony)	Alexey Good
2023	"Veryu v tebya"	Alexey Good
2023	"Tsaritsa"	Masha Zhemchuzhina
2023	"Kosmicheski / Poobeshchay / Durak"	Masha Zhemchuzhina
