= The Voice (Russian TV series) season 14 =

The Voice
- Season 14
- Presented by: Yana Churikova
- Coaches: Vladimir Presnyakov; Pelageya; Ildar Abdrazakov; ANNA ASTI
- Winner: Elmira Karakhanova
- Winning coach: Ildar Abdrazakov
- Runner-up: Alexey Smirnov

Release
- Original network: Channel One
- Original release: 23 January – 24 April 2026

Season chronology
- ← Previous; Season 13

The fourteenth season of the Russian reality talent show The Voice premiered on January 23, 2026, on Channel One which is the fourth time that the show is not released in Fall season. The show maintained its established format, with blind auditions, battles, and live performances. This season's coaching panel consisted of Vladimir Presnyakov who returned to the show for his third season after a one-season hiatus, Pelageya who returns for her sixth season as a coach, and debutants Ildar Abdrazakov and ANNA ASTI. Yana Churikova once again hosted the show.

Elmira Karakhanova was announced as the winner of the season, marking Ildar Abdrazakov's first win as a coach. With Karakhanova's win, Ildar Abdrazakov became the fourth coach, after Grigory Leps, Konstantin Meladze, and Hibla Gerzmava to win on their debut season.

== Coaches and host ==
Vladimir Presnyakov, and Pelageya, returned for their third and sixth seasons, respectively, along with debutants Ildar Abdrazakov and Anna Asti, both from their first season.

Yana Churikova continued as the presenter of the show.

The Voice season 14 coaches and presenter

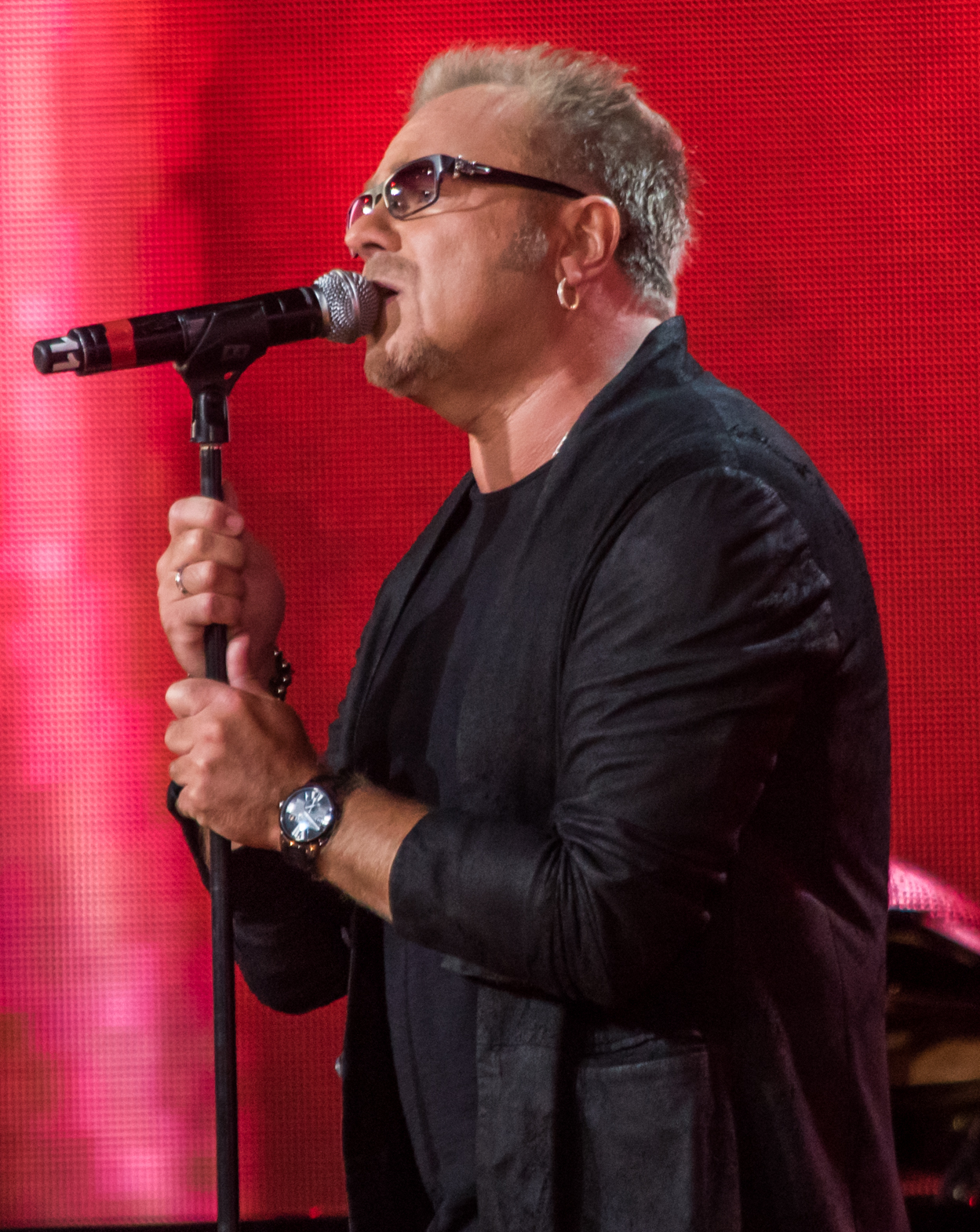
Vladimir Presnyakov

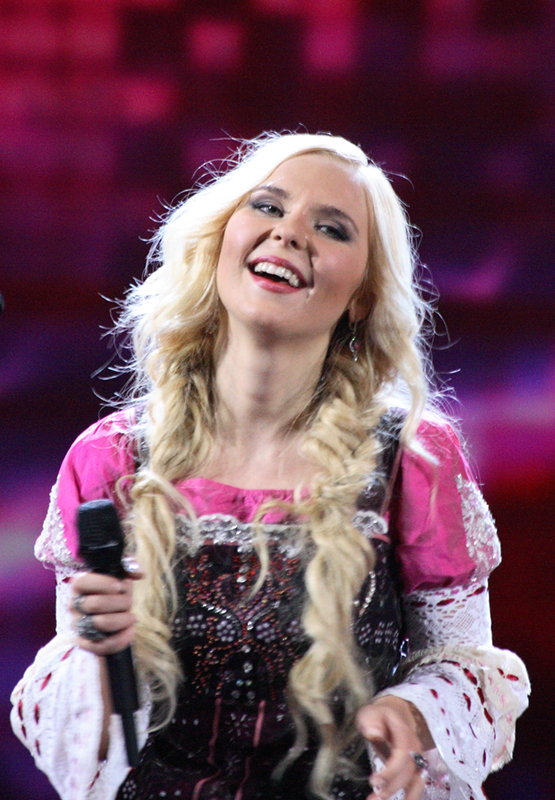
Pelageya

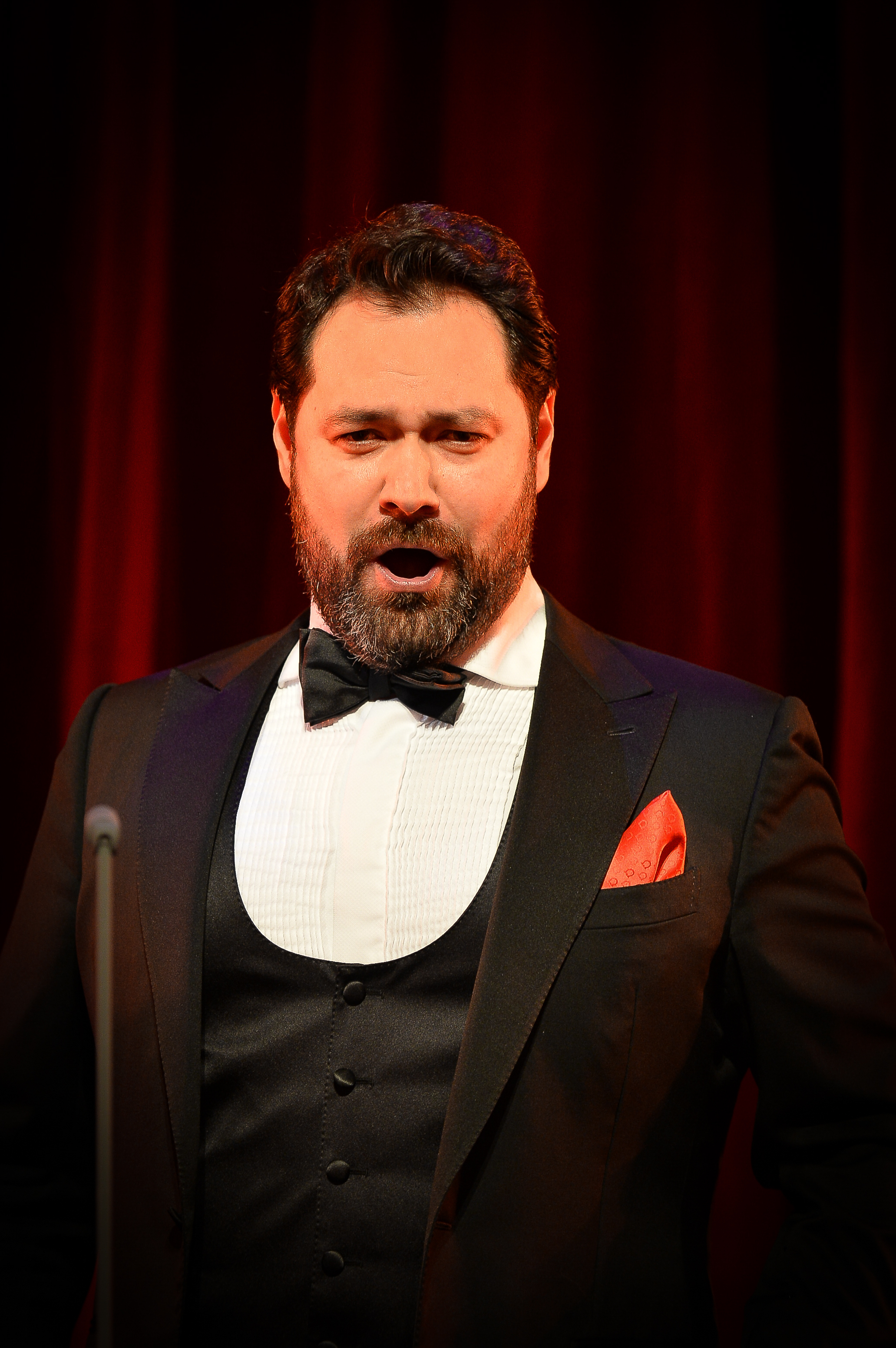
Ildar Abdrazakov

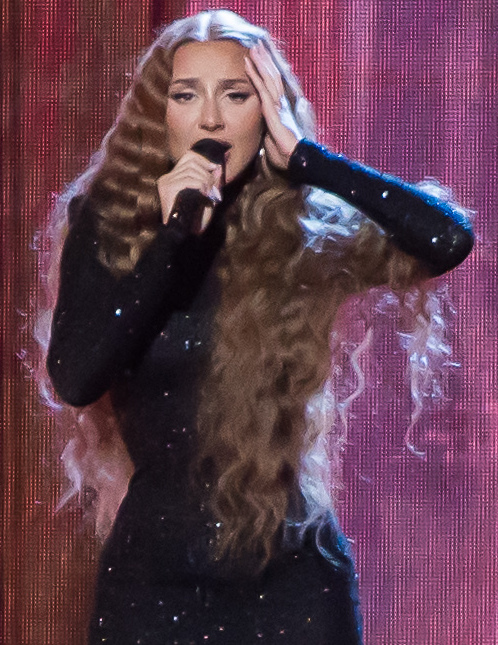
ANNA ASTI

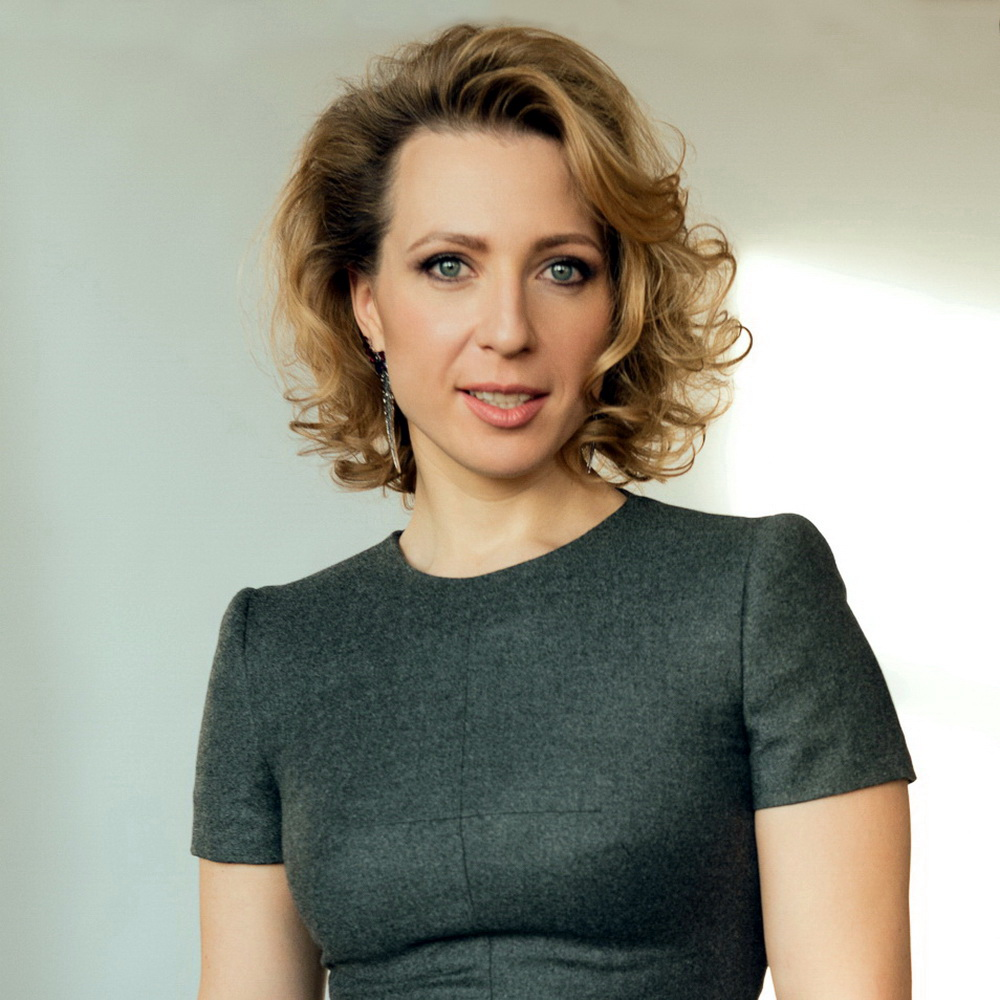
Yana Churikova

== Teams ==
Colour key

- Winner
- Runner-up
- Third place
- Fourth place
- Eliminated in the Final
- Eliminated in the Semi-final
- Stolen in the Knockout rounds
- Eliminated in the Knockout rounds
- Eliminated in the Battle rounds

Coach	Top 48 Artists				
Vladimir Presnyakov					
Vladimir Presnyakov	Alexey Smirnov	Ksenia Aksyutik	Ekaterina Gurova	~~Zlata Barzdova~~	Elena Dorodiykh
Vladimir Presnyakov	Iulya Gavrilova	Ksenia Rado	Georgiy Gogichaev	Aleksandra Novgorodova	Ksenia Misutkina
Vladimir Presnyakov	Maria Mahova	Aleksander Karnov	Karina Molaka		
Pelageya					
Pelageya	Alexander Guzko	Valery Makarov	Zlata Barzdova	~~Valeria Petrova~~	Ivan Stepanov
Pelageya	Artyom Ledenyov	Zhoselena Fokko	Yulia Galkina	Azer Nasibov	Arkady Fyodorov
Pelageya	Viktoria Maralyova	Ilya Ivanov	Valentina Bezuk		
Ildar Abdrazakov					
Ildar Abdrazakov	Elmira Karakhanova	Valeria Petrova	Aleksandra Karabeshkina	~~Arsen Stepanian~~	Graf Dombsovsky
Ildar Abdrazakov	Eugeny Vereni	Ivan Kuraev	Vadim Lanovoy	Eva Bristol	Galina Voynichenko
Ildar Abdrazakov	Gulnaz Sutanova	Olesya Miroshnichenko & Ksenia Girina	Olga Stulina		
ANNA ASTI					
ANNA ASTI	Arsen Stepanyan	Yulia Mazunova	Diana Dokhoyai	~~Ekaterina Gueova~~	Aida Safonova
ANNA ASTI	Irina Stepanova	Ionella Russu	Nikita Zuravlyov	Yulia Tishkina	Leonid Ovrutsky
ANNA ASTI	Ilya Nikko	Viacheslav Nikorov	Denitsa Karaslanova		
Note: italicized names are artists stolen from another team during the battles or the knockouts (names struck through within former teams).

== The Blind Auditions ==
The show begins with the blind auditions. In each audition, an artist sings their piece in front of the coaches, whose chairs are facing the audience. If a coach is interested in working with the artist, they may press their button to face the artist. If only one coach presses the button, the artist automatically becomes part of their team. If multiple coaches turn, they will compete for the artist, who will decide which team they will join. As from season seven, each coach must have to complete its team with twelve artists. Each coach has granted four "blocks" instead of three from the previous season to prevent another coach from getting an artist.

✔	Coach pressed "I WANT YOU" button
✔	Coach pressed "I WANT YOU" button, even its team has already full
	Artist joined this coach's team
	Artist defaulted to a coach's team
	Artist was eliminated with no coach pressing their button
✘	Coach pressed "I WANT YOU" button, but was blocked by another coach from getting the artist
	Blocked by Presnyakov; Blocked by Pelageya; Blocked by Abdrazakov; Blocked by ANNA ASTI

Episode	Order	Artist	Age	Origin	Song	Coach's and artist's choices			
Episode	Order	Artist	Age	Origin	Song	Presnyakov	Pelageya	Abdrazakov	ANNA ASTI
Episode 1 (January 23)	1	Olga Stulina	36	Moscow	"Кармен"	—	—	✔	—
Episode 1 (January 23)	2	Leonid Ovrutsky	43	Moscow	"Ешё минута"	✔	—	—	✔
Episode 1 (January 23)	3	Elena Dorodiykh	38	Novosibirsk	"Fighter"	✔	—	✔	✔
Episode 1 (January 23)	4	Egor Fyodorov	30	Moscow	"Вдоль по Питерской"	—	—	—	—
Episode 1 (January 23)	5	Aleksandra Karabeshkina	26	Chelyabinsk	"Привет"	—	—	✔	—
Episode 1 (January 23)	6	Daria Kukarskikh	26	Saint Petersburg	"Улыбка"	—	—	—	—
Episode 1 (January 23)	7	Arsen Stepanyan	34	Yerevan	"Nessun dorma"	✔	✘	✔	✔
Episode 1 (January 23)	8	Elizaveta Grinkevich	34	Moscow	"Море"	—	—	—	—
Episode 1 (January 23)	9	Iulya Gavrilova	17	Kinel-Cherkassy	"Somebody to Love"	✔	✔	✔	✔
Episode 2 (January 30)	1	Ksenia Aksyutik	26	Brest, Belarus	"Highway to Hell"	✔	✘	✔	✔
Episode 2 (January 30)	2	Alexander Guzko	35	Stavropol	"Ойся, ты ойся"	—	✔	—	—
Episode 2 (January 30)	3	Diana Dokhoyai	23	Chistoozyorny	"Нежность"	✔	✔	✔	✔
Episode 2 (January 30)	4	Vladislav Dako	35	Smolensk	"Knockin' on Heaven's Door"	—	—	—	—
Episode 2 (January 30)	5	Yulia Mazunova	20	Samara	"Медленно"	✔	—	—	✔
Episode 2 (January 30)	6	Eugeniy Kozomorov	35	Ivanovo	"Шёлк"	—	—	—	—
Episode 2 (January 30)	7	ElMira Karakhanova	30	Novokuznetsk	"Адажио"	✔	✔	✔	✔
Episode 2 (January 30)	8	Georgi Gogichaev	29	Caucasus	"Shake It On"	✔	—	—	—
Episode 2 (January 30)	9	Vadim Lanovoy	36	Vidnoye	"Романс"	✔	✘	✔	✘
Episode 3 (February 06)	1	Ivan Stephanov	25	Moscow Oblast	"Катюша"	—	✔	✘	—
Episode 3 (February 06)	2	Aleksandra Novgorodova	20	Nizhny Novgorod	"Cabaret"	✔	—	—	—
Episode 3 (February 06)	3	Anton Popov	40	Moscow	"Любив"	—	—	—	—
Episode 3 (February 06)	4	Gulnaz Sultanova	44	Bugulma	"Калиффа"	✔	—	✔	✔
Episode 3 (February 06)	5	Kazbek Ortsuev	33	Grozny	"Ты не верь слезам"	—	—	—	—
Episode 3 (February 06)	6	Yulia Tishkina	35	Yeniseysk	"Топит"	—	—	—	✔
Episode 3 (February 06)	7	Yulia Galkina	25	Vladimir, Russia	"Погадай"	✔	✔	—	✔
Episode 3 (February 06)	8	Viacheslav Novikov	32	Omsk	"Ты скажи мне, вишня"	—	—	—	✔
Episode 3 (February 06)	9	Anna Kharkovskarya	20	Moscow	"Поздно"	—	—	—	—
Episode 3 (February 06)	10	Ionella Russu	18	Moscow	"Mamma Knows Best"	✔	—	✔	✔
Episode 4 (February 13)	1	Ekaterina Gurova	22	Aldanskaya	"Люба"	✘	✔	✔	✔
Episode 4 (February 13)	2	Ruslan Chobabov	24	Tashkent	"Я тебя рисуо"	—	—	—	—
Episode 4 (February 13)	3	Denitsa Karaslavova	23	Sofia	"Never Enough"	—	—	—	✔
Episode 4 (February 13)	4	Galina Voynichenko	36	Moscow	"Звезда"	✔	✔	✔	✔
Episode 4 (February 13)	5	Leonid Bakhtalin	45	Moscow	"Куплеы Єскамильо"	—	—	—	—
Episode 4 (February 13)	6	Karina Lomaka	33	Magadan	"I See Red"	✔	—	✘	✔
Episode 4 (February 13)	7	Sofiya Vorona	21	Kingisepp	"Камаринская"	—	—	—	—
Episode 4 (February 13)	8	Ivan Kuraev	27	Voronezh	"Сердце на снегу"	—	—	✔	—
Episode 4 (February 13)	9	Maria Mahova	34	Moscow	"Кабриолет"	✔	—	—	✔
Episode 4 (February 13)	10	Azer Nasibov	25	Leningradskaya oblast'	"Maybe I Maybe You"	✔	✔	✔	✘
Episode 5 (February 20)	1	Valentina Bezuk	32	Streletskoye	"Ваня"	—	✔	✔	—
Episode 5 (February 20)	2	Ilya Ivanov	37	Kazan	"Nothing Compares 2 U"	✔	✔	✔	✘
Episode 5 (February 20)	3	Anna Pershina	32	Bratsk	"Сумасшедшая"	—	—	—	—
Episode 5 (February 20)	4	Pavel Balabanov	37	Orenburg	"Беловежская пуша"	—	—	—	—
Episode 5 (February 20)	5	Ksenia Rado	35	Almaty	"Кухни"	✔	—	—	—
Episode 5 (February 20)	6	Olesya Miroshnichenko & Ksenia Girina	20/33	Balashikha	"The Flower Duet"	✔	—	✔	—
Episode 5 (February 20)	7	Artyom Ledenyov	28	Orenburg	"Тишина"	—	✔	—	—
Episode 5 (February 20)	8	Zlata Barzdova	18	Mogilev	"Воля"	✔	—	✔	✔
Episode 5 (February 20)	9	Mikhail Grachevsky	51	Moscow	"Hero"	—	—	—	—
Episode 5 (February 20)	10	Alexey Smirnov	41	Donetskaya Narodnaya Respublika	"Озеро Надеждй"	✔	✔	—	—
Episode 6 (February 27)	1	Polina Zapolskaya	29	Bogotol	"Широка река"	—	—	—	—
Episode 6 (February 27)	2	Valery Makarov	24	Samara	"La donna è mobile"	—	✔	—	—
Episode 6 (February 27)	3	Aida Safonova	43	Tajikistan	"К единственному, нежному"	✘	—	✔	✔
Episode 6 (February 27)	4	Irina Stepanova	17	Novocheboksarsk	"Ain't Nobody"	✔	—	✔	✔
Episode 6 (February 27)	5	Graf Dombsovsky	37	Moscow	"две гитары"	—	—	✔	—
Episode 6 (February 27)	6	Kristina Dirks	35	Moscow	"Времени нет"	—	—	—	—
Episode 6 (February 27)	7	Ilia Durov	46	Ivanovo	"Я—то, что надо"	—	—	—	—
Episode 6 (February 27)	8	Eva Bristol	39	Moscow	"What's Up?"	✘	—	✔	✔
Episode 6 (February 27)	9	Arkady Fyodorov	32	Tula, Russia	"луна"	—	✔	—	—
Episode 6 (February 27)	10	Valeria Petrova	24	Maykop	"No Time to Die"	✔	✔	✔	✔
Episode 7 ( March 06)	1	Eugeny Vereni	32	Belarus	"Мадонна"	—	—	✔	✘
Episode 7 ( March 06)	2	Zhoselena Fokko	25	Moscow	"Killing Me Softly with His Song"	✔	✔	✔	✔
Episode 7 ( March 06)	3	Mamut Useinov	28	Republic of Crimea (Russia)	"Кто-то простот"	—	—	Team Full	—
Episode 7 ( March 06)	4	Kaim Aleksan	30	Riga	"Parlami d'amore Mariù"	—	—	Team Full	—
Episode 7 ( March 06)	5	Ksenia Misutkina	27	Penza	"Романс скрипача"	✔	—	Team Full	—
Episode 7 ( March 06)	6	Ilya Nikko	28	Moscow	"Океан"	✔	—	Team Full	✔
Episode 7 ( March 06)	7	Alisa Frants	19	Vyborg	"Вальс-бостон"	—	—	Team Full	—
Episode 7 ( March 06)	8	Aleksander Karnov	33	Belaya Kalitva	"I've Got You Under My Skin"	✔	—	Team Full	—
Episode 7 ( March 06)	9	Viktoria Maralyova	28	Saint Petersburg	"Заря"	✔	✔	✔	—
Episode 7 ( March 06)	10	Zakar Mironenko	36	Magadan	"Believer"	Team Full	Team Full	Team Full	—
Episode 7 ( March 06)	11	Nikita Zuravlyov	33	Novokuznetsk	"Ты не цалуй"	✔	✔	✔	✔

== The Battles ==
The Battle Rounds aired from March 13 to March 20 2026. Contestants who win their battle would advance to the Knockout rounds. No steals were allowed in this round.

Colour key

Artist won the Battle and advanced to the Knockouts
Artist lost the Battle and was eliminated

Episode	Coach	Order	Winner	Song	Loser
Episode 8 (March 13)	Vladimir Presnyakov	1	Ksenia Aksyutik	"Dancing Queen"	Karina Lomaka
Episode 8 (March 13)	Ildar Abdrazakov	2	Graf Dombsovsky	"За розовым" ("Mas que nada")	Olga Stulina
Episode 8 (March 13)	Pelageya	3	Ivan Stepanov	"Под окном черёмуха колышется"	Valentina Bezuk
Episode 8 (March 13)	ANNA ASTI	4	Irina Stepanova	"Because of You"	Denitsa Karaslanova
Episode 8 (March 13)	Vladimir Presnyakov	5	Iulya Gavrilova	"Вчера"	Aleksander Karnov
Episode 8 (March 13)	Ildar Abdrazakov	6	Elmira Karakhanova	"Ave Maria"	Olesya Miroshnichenko & Ksenia Girina
Episode 8 (March 13)	Pelageya	7	Aleksander Guzko	"Чёрная луна"/ "Растворите мне тёмную темницу"	Ilya Ivanov
Episode 8 (March 13)	ANNA ASTI	8	Ekaterina Gurova	"Пожар"	Viacheslav Nikorov
Episode 8 (March 13)	Vladimir Presnyakov	9	Elena Dorodiykh	"Верю в тебя"	Maria Mahova
Episode 8 (March 13)	Ildar Abdrazakov	10	Ivan Kuraev	"Музыка"	Gulnaz Sutanova
Episode 8 (March 13)	Pelageya	11	Zhoselena Fokko	"Валькирия"/ "Из подвешенья"	Viktoria Maralyova
Episode 8 (March 13)	ANNA ASTI	12	Yulia Mazunova	"Forever Young"	Ilya Nikko
Episode 9 (March 20)	Ildar Abdrazakov	1	Arsen Stepanian	"The Phantom of the Opera"	Galina Voynichenko
Episode 9 (March 20)	ANNA ASTI	2	Aida Safonova	"Один день"	Leonid Ovrutsky
Episode 9 (March 20)	Vladimir Presnyakov	3	Zlata Barzdova	"Я не отсуплю"	Ksenia Misutkina
Episode 9 (March 20)	Pelageya	4	Artyom Ledenyov	"This Love"	Arkady Fyodorov
Episode 9 (March 20)	Ildar Abdrazakov	5	Eugeny Vereni	"Они знакомы давно"	Eva Bristol
Episode 9 (March 20)	ANNA ASTI	6	Diana Dokhoyai	"Люба. Любовь"	Yulia Tishkina
Episode 9 (March 20)	Vladimir Presnyakov	7	Aleksey Smirnov	"Тёмная ночь"	Aleksandra Novgorodova
Episode 9 (March 20)	Pelageya	8	Valery Makarov	"Luna"	Azer Nasibov
Episode 9 (March 20)	ANNA ASTI	9	Ionella Russu	"Нон-стоп"	Nikita Zuravlyov
Episode 9 (March 20)	Ildar Abdrazakov	10	Aleksandra Karabeshkina	"When You Tell Me That You Love Me"	Vadim Lanovoy
Episode 9 (March 20)	Pelageya	11	Valeria Petrova	"Музыки осталось мало"	Yulia Galkina
Episode 9 (March 20)	Vladimir Presnyakov	12	Ksenia Rado	"Beat It"	Georgi Gogichaev

== The Knockouts ==
The Knockout Rounds aired from March 27 to April 3, 2026. Similar to the previous two seasons, each coach pairs three artists into one knockout with only one contestant from the trio advances to the next round and also can steal one losing artist from another coach. The top 12 contestants moved on to the Semifinal.

Colour key

Artist won the Knockout and advanced to the Semifinal
Artist lost the Knockout but was stolen by another coach and advanced to the Semifinal
Artist lost the Knockout and was eliminated

Episode	Coach	Order	Song	Artists		Song	'Steal' result			
Episode	Coach	Order	Song	Winner	Losers	Song	Presnyakov	Pelageya	Abdrazakov	Anna Asti
Episode 10 (March 27)	Pelageya	1	"А река течёт"	Aleksander Guzko	Zhoselena Fokko	"Sax"	—	—N/a	—	—
Episode 10 (March 27)	Pelageya	1	"А река течёт"	Aleksander Guzko	Valeria Petrova	"Корабли"	—	—N/a	✔	—
Episode 10 (March 27)	Ildar Abdrazakov	2	"Diamonds Are Forever"	Elmira Karakhanova	Ivan Kuraev	"Земля-Юпитер"	—	—	Team Full	—
Episode 10 (March 27)	Ildar Abdrazakov	2	"Diamonds Are Forever"	Elmira Karakhanova	Eugeny Vereni	"Стоп, ночь"	—	—	Team Full	
Episode 10 (March 27)	ANNA ASTI	3	"Ресницы"	Yulia Mazunova	Ionella Russu	"Left Outside Alone"	—	—	Team Full	—N/a
Episode 10 (March 27)	ANNA ASTI	3	"Ресницы"	Yulia Mazunova	Irina Stepanova	"Queen of the Night"	—	—	Team Full	—N/a
Episode 10 (March 27)	Vladimir Presnyakov	4	"Баллада о любви"	Aleksey Smirnov	Ksenia Rado	"Выключи свет"	—N/a	—	Team Full	—
Episode 10 (March 27)	Vladimir Presnyakov	4	"Баллада о любви"	Aleksey Smirnov	Iulya Gavrilova	"Smells Like Teen Spirit"	—N/a	—	Team Full	—
Episode 11 (April 03)	Pelageya	1	"На заре ты её не буди	Valery Makarov	Artyom Ledenyov	"Moscow Calling"	—	—N/a	Team Full	—
Episode 11 (April 03)	Pelageya	1	"На заре ты её не буди	Valery Makarov	Ivan Stepanov	"Я назову тебя зоренькой"	—	—N/a	Team Full	—
Episode 11 (April 03)	ANNA ASTI	2	"The Power of Love"	Diana Dokhoyai	Ekaterina Gurova	"Батарейка"	✔	—	Team Full	—N/a
Episode 11 (April 03)	ANNA ASTI	2	"The Power of Love"	Diana Dokhoyai	Aida Safonova	"Обмани меня"	Team Full	—	Team Full	—N/a
Episode 11 (April 03)	Ildar Abdrazakov	3	"Eye of the Tiger"	Aleksandra Karabeshkina	Graf Dombsovsky	"Я не забуду тебя"	Team Full	—	Team Full	—
Episode 11 (April 03)	Ildar Abdrazakov	3	"Eye of the Tiger"	Aleksandra Karabeshkina	Arsen Stepanian	"Как молоды мы были"	Team Full	—	Team Full	✔
Episode 11 (April 03)	Vladimir Presnyakov	4	"Звенит январская вьюга"	Ksenia Aksyutik	Elena Dorodiykh	"Je t'aime"	Team Full	—	Team Full	Team Full
Episode 11 (April 03)	Vladimir Presnyakov	4	"Звенит январская вьюга"	Ksenia Aksyutik	Zlata Barzdova	"Me Voy"	Team Full	✔	Team Full	Team Full

== Live shows ==
Colour key:

Artist was saved
Artist was eliminated

=== Week 1: Top 12 — Quarterfinals (April 10) ===
The Live Top 12 Semifinal comprised episode 12. The top twelve artists performed, with two artists from each team advancing based on the sum of the viewers' and coach's votes.

Episode 12 (April 10)	Coach	Order	Artist	Song	Coach's vote (/100%)	Public's vote (/100%)	Votes' sum	Result
Episode 12 (April 10)	Ildar Abdrazakov	1	Elmira Karakhanova	"Журчат ручьи"	50,0%	37,9%	87,9%	Advanced
Episode 12 (April 10)	Ildar Abdrazakov	2	Aleksandra Karabeshkina	"Не обижай меня"	20,0%	12,8%	32,8%	Eliminated
Episode 12 (April 10)	Ildar Abdrazakov	3	Valeria Petrova	"Stop!"	30,0%	49,3%	79,3%	Advanced
Episode 12 (April 10)	Pelageya	4	Zlata Barzdova	"Дальше, дальше"	20,0%	22,6%	42,6%	Eliminated
Episode 12 (April 10)	Pelageya	5	Aleksander Guzko	"Казачья песня"	50,0%	34,6%	84,6%	Advanced
Episode 12 (April 10)	Pelageya	6	Valery Makarov	"Алёнушка"	30,0%	42,8%	72,8%	Advanced
Episode 12 (April 10)	Vladimir Presnyakov	7	Aleksey Smirnov	"Я зову дождь"	30,0%	54,8%	84,8%	Advanced
Episode 12 (April 10)	Vladimir Presnyakov	8	Ekaterina Gurova	"Понарошку"	20,0%	14,2%	34,2%	Eliminated
Episode 12 (April 10)	Vladimir Presnyakov	9	Ksenia Aksyutik	"О нём"	50,0%	31,0%	81,0%	Advanced
Episode 12 (April 10)	ANNA ASTI	10	Diana Dokhoyai	"Ты здесь"	30,0%	30,4%	60,4%	Eliminated
Episode 12 (April 10)	ANNA ASTI	11	Arsen Stepanian	"Sorry Seems to Be the Hardest Word"	20,0%	45,1%	65,1%	Advanced
Episode 12 (April 10)	ANNA ASTI	12	Yulia Mazunova	"Ты меня любишь"	50,0%	24,5%	74,5%	Advanced
