= Pribrezhny =

Pribrezhny (Russian: Боровинка) is the name of several rural localities in Russia:

- Pribrezhny, Amur Oblast, a settlement in Vostochny Selsoviet of Oktyabrsky District, Amur Oblast
- Pribrezhny, Astrakhan Oblast, a settlement in Zamyansky Selsoviet of Yenotayevsky District, Astrakhan Oblast
- Pribrezhny, Belgorod Oblast a settlement in Novooskolsky District, Belgorod Oblast
- Pribrezhny, Samara Oblast a settlement in Krasnoglinsky District, Samara Oblast
