= Kozinka =

Kozinka (Russian: Козинка) is the name of several rural localities in Russia.

== Modern localities ==
=== Astrakhan Oblast ===
As of 2014, one rural locality in Astrakhan Oblast bears this name:

Astrakhan Oblast location map
Location of Kozinka in Astrakhan Oblast

- Kozinka, Astrakhan Oblast, a selo in Prishibinsky Selsoviet of Yenotayevsky District; 47°45′N 46°34′E

=== Belgorod Oblast ===
As of 2014, one rural locality in Belgorod Oblast bears this name:

Belgorod Oblast location map
Location of Kozinka in Belgorod Oblast

- Kozinka, Belgorod Oblast, a selo in Grayvoronsky District; 50°28′N 35°36′E

=== Bryansk Oblast ===
As of 2014, one rural locality in Bryansk Oblast bears this name:

Bryansk Oblast location map
Location of Kozinka in Bryansk Oblast

- Kozinka, Bryansk Oblast, a selo in Usozhsky Rural Administrative Okrug of Komarichsky District; 52°21′N 34°44′E

=== Omsk Oblast ===
As of 2014, one rural locality in Omsk Oblast bears this name:

Omsk Oblast location map
Location of Kozinka in Omsk Oblast

- Kozinka, Omsk Oblast, a village in Medetsky Rural Okrug of Cherlaksky District; 54°09′N 75°25′E

=== Oryol Oblast ===
As of 2014, one rural locality in Oryol Oblast bears this name:

Oryol Oblast location map
Location of Kozinka in Oryol Oblast

- Kozinka, Oryol Oblast, a village in Grachevsky Selsoviet of Zalegoshchensky District; 52°59′N 36°45′E

=== Rostov Oblast ===
As of 2014, one rural locality in Rostov Oblast bears this name:

Rostov Oblast location map
Location of Kozinka in Rostov Oblast

- Kozinka, Rostov Oblast, a khutor in Gruzinovskoye Rural Settlement of Morozovsky District; 48°27′N 41°48′E

=== Stavropol Krai ===
As of 2014, one rural locality in Stavropol Krai bears this name:

- Kozinka, Stavropol Krai, a khutor in Vysotsky Selsoviet of Petrovsky District

=== Tver Oblast ===
As of 2014, one rural locality in Tver Oblast bears this name:

- Kozinka, Tver Oblast, a settlement under the administrative jurisdiction of Olenino Urban Settlement in Oleninsky District

== Alternative names ==
- Kozinka, alternative name of Kazinka, a selo in Valuysky District of Belgorod Oblast; 50°14′N 37°50′E
- Kozinka, alternative name of Kazinka, a village in Glodnevsky Rural Administrative Okrug of Brasovsky District in Bryansk Oblast; 52°38′N 34°52′E
- Kozinka, alternative name of Kazinka, a selo in Kazinsky Selsoviet of Terbunsky District in Lipetsk Oblast; 52°05′N 38°23′E
- Kozinka, alternative name of Kazinka, a village in Lavsky Selsoviet of Yeletsky District in Lipetsk Oblast; 52°35′N 38°32′E
- Kozinka, alternative name of Kazinka, a village in Dubrovsky Selsoviet of Dolzhansky District in Oryol Oblast; 52°12′N 37°21′E
- Kozinka, alternative name of Kozino, a selo in Ust-Tarksky District of Novosibirsk Oblast; 55°31′N 75°29′E
- Kozinka, alternative name of Malaya Kazinka, a village in Danilovsky Selsoviet of Pokrovsky District in Oryol Oblast; 52°33′N 36°53′E
- Kozinka, alternative name of Voyskovaya Kazinka, a selo in Voyskovokazinsky Selsoviet of Dolgorukovsky District in Lipetsk Oblast; 52°25′N 38°04′E
