= Tabun-Aral =

Tabun-Aral Табун-Арал
- Selo
- Location within Astrakhan Oblast Location within Russia
- Coordinates: 47°02′N 47°19′E
- Country: Russia
- Region: Astrakhan Oblast
- District: Yenotayevsky District
- Time zone: UTC+4:00

Tabun-Aral (Russian: Табун-Арал) is a rural locality (a selo) in Tabun-Aralsky Selsoviet of Yenotayevsky District, Astrakhan Oblast, Russia. The population was 111 as of 2010. There are 2 streets.

== Geography ==
Tabun-Aral is located 39 km southeast of Yenotayevka (the district's administrative centre) by road. Lenino is the nearest rural locality.
