= Fyodorovka, Yenotayevsky District, Astrakhan Oblast =

Fyodorovka Фёдоровка
- Selo
- Location within Astrakhan Oblast Location within Russia
- Coordinates: 47°20′N 46°57′E
- Country: Russia
- Region: Astrakhan Oblast
- District: Yenotayevsky District
- Time zone: UTC+4:00

Fyodorovka (Russian: Фёдоровка) is a rural locality (a selo) and the administrative center of Fyodorovsky Selsoviet of Yenotayevsky District, Astrakhan Oblast, Russia. The population was 862 as of 2010. There are 13 streets.

== Geography ==
Fyodorovka is located 12 km northwest of Yenotayevka (the district's administrative centre) by road. Ivanovka is the nearest rural locality.
