= Semyonovka =

Semyonovka, also spelled Semenovka or Semënovka, may refer to:

- Semyonovka, Armenia, a village in Armenia
- Semënovka, former name of Qızılkənd, a village in Azerbaijan
- Semyonovka, Russia, several inhabited localities in Russia
- Semyonovka, alternative spelling of Semenivka, several locations in Ukraine
- Semyonovka, Issyk Kul, a village in Kyrgyzstan
