= Grachi, Astrakhan Oblast =

Grachi Грачи
- Selo
- Location within Astrakhan Oblast Location within Russia
- Coordinates: 47°47′N 46°16′E
- Country: Russia
- Region: Astrakhan Oblast
- District: Yenotayevsky District
- Time zone: UTC+4:00

Grachi (Russian: Грачи) is a rural locality (a selo) and the administrative center of Grachyovsky Selsoviet of Yenotayevsky District, Astrakhan Oblast, Russia. The population was 629 as of 2010. There are 13 streets.

== Geography ==
Grachi is located 91 km northwest of Yenotayevka (the district's administrative centre) by road. Nikolskoye is the nearest rural locality.
