= Kopanovka =

Kopanovka Копановка
- Selo
- Location within Astrakhan Oblast Location within Russia
- Coordinates: 47°27′N 46°48′E
- Country: Russia
- Region: Astrakhan Oblast
- District: Yenotayevsky District
- Time zone: UTC+4:00

Kopanovka (Russian: Копановка) is a rural locality (a selo) in Yenotayevsky District, Astrakhan Oblast, Russia. The population was 1,052 as of 2010. There are 18 streets.

== Geography ==
Kopanovka is located 34 km northwest of Yenotayevka (the district's administrative centre) by road. Mikhaylovka is the nearest rural locality.
