= Promyslovy =

Promyslovy Промысловый
- Settlement
- Location within Astrakhan Oblast Location within European Russia Location within Russia
- Coordinates: 47°00′N 47°25′E
- Country: Russia
- Region: Astrakhan Oblast
- District: Yenotayevsky District
- Time zone: UTC+4:00

Promyslovy (Russian: Промысловый) is a rural locality (a settlement) in Tabun-Aralsky Selsoviet of Yenotayevsky District, Astrakhan Oblast, Russia. The population was 41 as of 2010. There is 1 street.

== Geography ==
Promyslovy is located 52 km southeast of Yenotayevka (the district's administrative centre) by road. Seroglazka is the nearest rural locality.
