= Iki-Chibirsky =

Iki-Chibirsky Ики-Чибирский
- Settlement
- Location within Astrakhan Oblast Location within Russia
- Coordinates: 46°55′N 47°33′E
- Country: Russia
- Region: Astrakhan Oblast
- District: Yenotayevsky District
- Time zone: UTC+4:00

Iki-Chibirsky (Russian: Ики-Чибирский) is a rural locality (a settlement) in Srednevolzhsky Selsoviet of Yenotayevsky District, Astrakhan Oblast, Russia. The population was 125 as of 2010. There are 2 streets.

== Geography ==
Iki-Chibirsky is located 69 km southeast of Yenotayevka (the district's administrative centre) by road. Beregovoy is the nearest rural locality.
