= Yekaterinovka =

Yekaterinovka may refer to:

- Yekaterinovka, Azerbaijan, a village in Khachmaz Rayon of Azerbaijan
- Yekaterinovka, Russia, name of several inhabited localities in Russia
