= Kozinka, Astrakhan Oblast =

Kozinka Козинка
- Selo
- Location within Astrakhan Oblast Location within Russia
- Coordinates: 47°44′N 46°34′E
- Country: Russia
- Federal subject: Astrakhan Oblast
- District: Yenotayevsky District
- Time zone: UTC+4:00

Kozinka (Russian: Козинка) is a rural locality (a selo) in Prishibinsky Selsoviet of Yenotayevsky District, Astrakhan Oblast, Russia. The population was 11 as of 2010. There is 1 street.

== Geography ==
Kozinka is located 82 km northwest of Yenotayevka (the district's administrative centre) by road.
