= Yekaterinovka, Astrakhan Oblast =

Yekaterinovka Екатериновка
- Selo
- Location within Astrakhan Oblast Location within Russia
- Coordinates: 47°22′N 47°01′E
- Country: Russia
- Region: Astrakhan Oblast
- District: Yenotayevsky District
- Time zone: UTC+4:00

Yekaterinovka (Russian: Екатериновка) is a rural locality (a selo) in Fyodorovsky Selsoviet of Yenotayevsky District, Astrakhan Oblast, Russia. The population was 6 as of 2010. There are 2 streets.

== Geography ==
Yekaterinovka is located 22 km north of Yenotayevka (the district's administrative centre) by road. Dedushkin is the nearest rural locality.
