= Tsaritsa (song) =

Single by Anna Asti

from the album Tsaritsa
- Language: Russian
- Released: 14 July 2023
- Genre: Pop
- Length: 3:35
- Label: Fenix Music
- Songwriter: Dmitriy Loren
- Producer: Oleg Sashko

Anna Asti singles chronology
"Veryu v tebya" (2023)	"Tsaritsa" (2023)	"Topit" (2024)

Music video
- "Tsaritsa" on YouTube

"Tsaritsa" (Russian: Царица, lit. 'Emperor, Queen') is a song by a Ukrainian and Russian singer Anna Asti that was released on 14 July 2023 by Fenix Music. A music video for the song was released week later, on 22 July 2023.

The song topped airplay charts in Kazakhstan, Latvia and Moldova.

The song was awarded Female Singer of the Year and nominated for Song of the Year in the Russian National Music Award.

== Charts ==
=== Weekly charts ===
2023 weekly chart performance for "Tsaritsa"
Chart (2023)	Peak position
Belarus Airplay (TopHit)	21
CIS Airplay (TopHit)	18
Estonia Airplay (TopHit)	21
Kazakhstan Airplay (TopHit)	1
Latvia Airplay (TopHit)	1
Lithuania (AGATA)	3
Lithuania Airplay (TopHit)	5
Moldova Airplay (TopHit)	1
Russia Airplay (TopHit)	10

2024 weekly chart performance for "Tsaritsa"
Chart (2024)	Peak position
Belarus Airplay (TopHit)	21
CIS Airplay (TopHit)	26
Kazakhstan Airplay (TopHit)	5
Latvia Airplay (TopHit)	70
Latvia Streaming (LaIPA)	6
Moldova Airplay (TopHit)	4
Russia Airplay (TopHit)	23

2025 weekly chart performance for "Tsaritsa"
Chart (2025)	Peak position
Belarus Airplay (TopHit)	112
CIS Airplay (TopHit)	111
Kazakhstan Airplay (TopHit)	62
Latvia Airplay (TopHit)	127
Russia Airplay (TopHit)	70
Russia Streaming (TopHit) (Note: The Russian Streaming chart was launched in late March 2025. Therefore, "Tsaritsa" did not have a full run on the chart.)	13

2026 weekly chart performance for "Tsaritsa"
Chart (2026)	Peak position
Belarus Airplay (TopHit)	100
CIS Airplay (TopHit)	150
Kazakhstan Airplay (TopHit)	93
Latvia Airplay (TopHit)	133
Moldova Airplay (TopHit)	90
Russia Airplay (TopHit)	86
Russia Streaming (TopHit)	50

=== Monthly charts ===
2023 monthly chart performance for "Tsaritsa"
Chart (2023)	Peak position
Belarus Airplay (TopHit)	23
CIS Airplay (TopHit)	19
Estonia Airplay (TopHit)	25
Kazakhstan Airplay (TopHit)	3
Latvia Airplay (TopHit)	5
Lithuania Airplay (TopHit)	7
Moldova Airplay (TopHit)	2
Russia Airplay (TopHit)	12

2024 monthly chart performance for "Tsaritsa"
Chart (2024)	Peak position
Belarus Airplay (TopHit)	28
CIS Airplay (TopHit)	33
Kazakhstan Airplay (TopHit)	11
Latvia Airplay (TopHit)	94
Moldova Airplay (TopHit)	6
Russia Airplay (TopHit)	29

2025 monthly chart performance for "Tsaritsa"
Chart (2025)	Peak position
Kazakhstan Airplay (TopHit)	92
Russia Airplay (TopHit)	90
Russia Streaming (TopHit)	25

2026 monthly chart performance for "Tsaritsa"
Chart (2026)	Peak position
Russia Streaming (TopHit)	70

=== Year-end charts ===
2023 year-end chart performance for "Tsaritsa"
Chart (2023)	Position
Belarus Airplay (TopHit)	115
CIS Airplay (TopHit)	62
Estonia Airplay (TopHit)	153
Kazakhstan Airplay (TopHit)	28
Latvia Airplay (TopHit)	27
Lithuania Airplay (TopHit)	78
Russia Airplay (TopHit)	41

2024 year-end chart performance for "Tsaritsa"
Chart (2024)	Position
Belarus Airplay (TopHit)	45
CIS Airplay (TopHit)	78
Kazakhstan Airplay (TopHit)	20
Russia Airplay (TopHit)	59

2025 year-end chart performance for "Tsaritsa"
Chart (2025)	Position
Belarus Airplay (TopHit)	199
CIS Airplay (TopHit)	178
Russia Airplay (TopHit)	116
Russia Streaming (TopHit)	86

=== Decade-end charts ===
20s Decade-end chart performance
Chart (2025–2026)	Position
Russia Streaming (TopHit)	33
