= Po baram =

Single by Anna Asti
- Language: Russian
- Released: June 3, 2022
- Genre: Russian pop
- Length: 3:58
- Label: Fenix Music

"Po baram" (Russian: «По ба́рам») is a song by Russian-Ukrainian singer Anna Asti, released on June 3, 2022 as a single through the self-named label ANNA ASTI; the distributor was NDA Sound. The composition opened pre-orders for the album "Feniks" and became its featured single.

External videos
- По барам (тизер 1) on YouTube
- По барам (тизер 2) on YouTube
