= Pribrezhny, Astrakhan Oblast =

Pribrezhny Прибрежный
- Settlement
- Location within Astrakhan Oblast Location within Russia
- Coordinates: 46°50′N 47°36′E
- Country: Russia
- Region: Astrakhan Oblast
- District: Yenotayevsky District
- Time zone: UTC+4:00

Pribrezhny (Russian: Прибрежный) is a rural locality (a settlement) in Zamyansky Selsoviet of Yenotayevsky District, Astrakhan Oblast, Russia. The population was 107 as of 2010. There are 6 streets.

== Geography ==
Pribrezhny is located 244 km southeast of Yenotayevka (the district's administrative centre) by road. Zamyany is the nearest rural locality.
