= Plachu na tekhno =

Single by Khleb

from the album Pushka
- Language: Russian
- Released: November 10, 2017
- Genre: Pop
- Length: 2:50

"Plachu na tekhno" (Russian:«Пла́чу на техно») is a song by the Russian band Khleb from the 2017 album Pushka (2017), released through the labels Studio Soyuz and A+.

Music journalists called the original song one of the harbingers of the popularity of the legacy of the style of the group Ruki Vverh! in Russian pop music of the late 2010s and early 2020s, and the remake became one of the most popular Russian-language tracks of 2020.

== Cream Soda version ==
The premiere of the show "Exchanged Hits" with Khleb and the group "Cream Soda" took place on April 9, 2020. On April 10, a music video was released, which immediately attracted media attention.
