= Semyonovka, Lgovsky District, Kursk Oblast =

Rural locality in Russia

Semyonovka Семёновка
- Village
- Interactive map of Semyonovka
- Location of Semyonovka Semyonovka (Russia)
- Coordinates: 51°26′22″N 35°14′34″E
- Country: Russia
- Federal subject: Kursk Oblast
- Administrative district: Lgovsky District
- SelsovietSelsoviet: Vyshnederevensky

Population (2010 Census)
  - Total: 61
  - Estimate (2010): 61 (0%)

Municipal status
  - Municipal district: Lgovsky Municipal District
  - Rural settlement: Vyshnederevensky Selsoviet Rural Settlement
- Time zone: UTC+3 (MSK)
- Postal code: 307730
- Dialing code: +7 47140
- OKTMO ID: 38622417176
- Website: vishderss.rkursk.ru

Semyonovka (Russian: Семёновка) is a rural locality (Russian: деревня, lit. 'village') in Vyshnederevensky Selsoviet Rural Settlement, Lgovsky District, Kursk Oblast, Russia. Population: 61 (2010 census); 88 (2002 census);

== Geography ==
The village is located on the Malaya Loknya River (a left tributary of the Loknya in the Psel basin), 25 km from the Russia–Ukraine border, 73 km southwest of Kursk, 24.5 km south of the district center – the town Lgov, and 14.5 km from the selsoviet center – Vyshniye Derevenki.

Climate

Semyonovka has a warm-summer humid continental climate (Dfb in the Köppen climate classification).

== Transport ==
Semyonovka is located 21 km from the road of regional importance 38K-017 (Kursk – Lgov – Rylsk – border with Ukraine), 2 km from the road 38K-024 (Lgov – Sudzha), 16 km from the road 38K-030 (Rylsk – Korenevo – Sudzha), 3.5 km from the road of intermunicipal significance 38Н-564 (38K-030 – Kauchuk – 38K-024), 2.5 km from the nearest (closed) railway halt Anastasyevka (railway line Lgov I — Podkosylev).

The rural locality is situated 80 km from Kursk Vostochny Airport, 128 km from Belgorod International Airport and 279 km from Voronezh Peter the Great Airport.
