= Pribrezhny, Belgorod Oblast =

Pribrezhny Прибрежный
- Settlement
- Location within Belgorod Oblast Location within Russia
- Coordinates: 50°45′N 37°50′E
- Country: Russia
- Region: Belgorod Oblast
- District: Novooskolsky District
- Time zone: UTC+3:00

Pribrezhny (Russian: Прибрежный) is a rural locality (a settlement) in Novooskolsky District, Belgorod Oblast, Russia. The population was 1,168 as of 2010. There are 9 streets.

== Geography ==
Pribrezhny is located 2 km southwest of Novy Oskol (the district's administrative centre) by road. Novy Oskol is the nearest rural locality.
