= Pribrezhny, Samara Oblast =

Pribrezhny Прибрежный
- Urban-type settlement
- Location in Samara Oblast and Russia Pribrezhny (Russia)
- Coordinates: 53°29′16″N 49°51′32″E
- Country: Russia
- Federal subject: Samara Oblast
- Urban okrug: Samara
- Founded: 1959

Population (2025)
  - Total: 11,534
- Time zone: UTC+4:00
- Postal code: 443902
- Website: прибрежный.рф

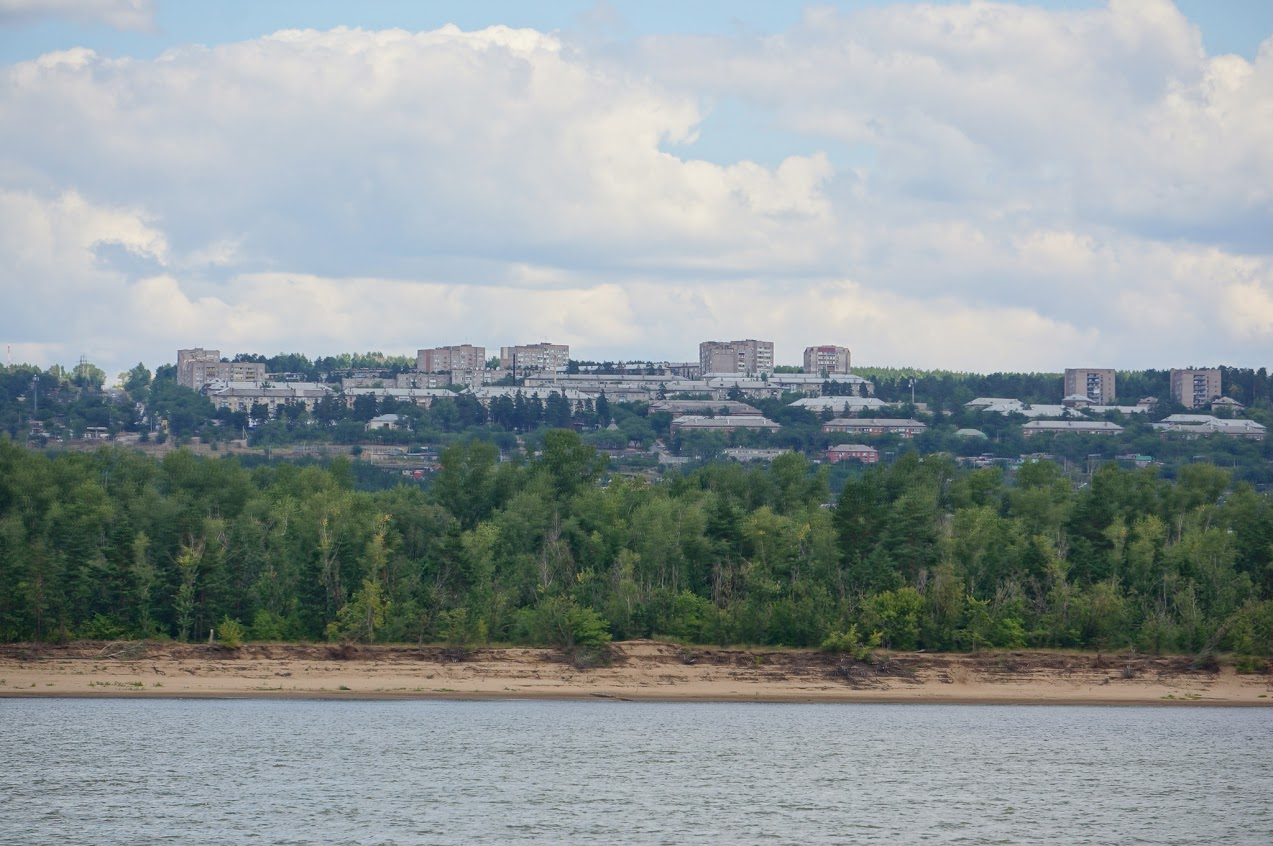
View of Priberezhny from the Volga River

Pribrezhny is an urban-type settlement in the Krasnoglinsky District of Samara, Russia. It is situated approximately 60 km from the city center and is surrounded by the territory of Stavropolsky District.

== History and geography ==
Construction of the settlement began in 1959, prompted by the development of nearby aerospace industry enterprises, including branches of the Kuybyshev Frunze Motor Plant and the Kuybyshev NPO "Trud." The location attracted skilled workers from across the USSR.

Before development began, archaeological surveys uncovered remains of Late Neolithic and Bronze Age settlements. Artifacts included clay animal figurines—goats and pigs—interpreted as ritual objects with symbolic meanings related to fertility and agriculture.

Initial housing consisted of barracks for construction teams, later followed by multi-story residential buildings with views of the Volga River. In 1959–1960, five such buildings were completed. In that same year, a detached station of the 29th Militarized Fire Unit was established.

Among early residents was Andrei Ivanovich Tikhiy, a World War II veteran, who contributed significantly to the organization of local governance and infrastructure.

In 1960, by resolution of the Kuybyshev Regional Executive Committee, Priberezhny was designated as a workers' settlement and placed under the Novo-Buyansky District of the Kuybyshev region.

Following the 23 December 1955 decree of the Presidium of the Supreme Soviet of the RSFSR, the first local council elections were held on 5 March 1961. Twenty-five deputies were elected, and an executive committee was formed on 10 March 1961. Nikolay Ivanovich Izin was elected chairman. Olga Fedorovna Sinotina served as executive secretary until August 1961. The council’s headquarters relocated from a residential flat to post office No. 57 later that year.

In 1962, the Zadelnaya railway station began operations.

On 8 October 1977, a gas explosion occurred at a local industrial warehouse. No casualties were reported, though damage was extensive. Initial reports cited gas-air mixture ignition due to a malfunction in the ventilation system.

== Archaeology ==
Archaeological research between 1957–1962 revealed multiple cultural layers from the Late Neolithic and Bronze Age. Discoveries include anthropomorphic and zoomorphic figurines interpreted as symbolic items used in fertility rituals or agricultural ceremonies.

Though not as prominent as other archaeological sites in the Volga region, these discoveries contribute to the broader understanding of prehistoric life and ritual practices in Samara Oblast.

== Population ==
As of June 1, 2025, the population of Priberezhny is 11,534. Age distribution includes: 1,149 children under age 6; 1,365 minors (ages 7–17); 1,380 young adults (18–29); 4,964 working-age adults (30–60); 2,514 senior citizens (60+); and 161 residents over age 80.
