= Kinel-Cherkassy =

Rural locality in Samara Oblast, Russia

Coordinates: 53°28′06″N 51°28′39″E

Kinel-Cherkassy (Russian: Кинель-Черкассы) is a rural locality (a selo) and the administrative center of Kinel-Cherkassky District, Samara Oblast, Russia. Population: 17,252 (2010 census); 18,536 (2002 census);
