= Semyonovka, Verkhnekhavsky District, Voronezh Oblast =

Semyonovka Семёновка
- Selo
- Location within Voronezh Oblast Location within Russia
- Coordinates: 51°54′N 40°02′E
- Country: Russia
- Region: Voronezh Oblast
- District: Verkhnekhavsky District
- Time zone: UTC+3:00

Semyonovka (Russian: Семёновка) is a rural locality (a selo) and the administrative center of Semyonovskoye Rural Settlement, Verkhnekhavsky District, Voronezh Oblast, Russia. The population was 352 as of 2010. There are 4 streets.

== Geography ==
Semyonovka is located 16 km southwest of Verkhnyaya Khava (the district's administrative centre) by road. Plyasovatka is the nearest rural locality.
