= Yekaterinovka, Rossoshansky District, Voronezh Oblast =

Yekaterinovka Екатериновка
- Selo
- Location within Voronezh Oblast Location within Russia
- Coordinates: 50°06′N 39°21′E
- Country: Russia
- Region: Voronezh Oblast
- District: Rossoshansky District
- Time zone: UTC+3:00

Yekaterinovka (Russian: Екатериновка) is a rural locality (a selo) in Lizinovskoye Rural Settlement, Rossoshansky District, Voronezh Oblast, Russia. The population was 405 as of 2010. There are 3 streets.

== Geography ==
Yekaterinovka is located 22 km southwest of Rossosh (the district's administrative centre) by road. Lizinovka is the nearest rural locality.
