= Semyonovka, Tretyakovsky District, Altai Krai =

Semyonovka Семёновка
- Settlement
- Location within Altai Krai Location within Russia
- Coordinates: 50°57′N 82°28′E
- Country: Russia
- Region: Altai Krai
- District: Tretyakovsky District
- Time zone: UTC+7:00

Semyonovka (Russian: Семёновка) is a rural locality (a settlement) in Shipunikhinsky Selsoviet, Tretyakovsky District, Altai Krai, Russia. The population was 131 as of 2013. There are 7 streets.

== Geography ==
Semyonovka is located 45 km east of Staroaleyskoye (the district's administrative centre) by road. Ivanovka is the nearest rural locality.
