= Pribrezhny, Amur Oblast =

Pribrezhny Прибрежный
- Settlement
- Location within Amur Oblast Location within Russia
- Coordinates: 50°25′N 129°10′E
- Country: Russia
- Region: Amur Oblast
- District: Oktyabrsky District
- Time zone: UTC+9:00

Pribrezhny (Russian: Прибрежный) is a rural locality (a settlement) in Vostochny Selsoviet of Oktyabrsky District, Amur Oblast, Russia. The population was 89 as of 2018. There are 6 streets.

== Geography ==
Pribrezhny is located 13 km northeast of Yekaterinoslavka (the district's administrative centre) by road. Borisovo is the nearest rural locality.
