= Yekaterinovsky District =

Yekaterinovsky District Екатериновский район (Russian)
- District
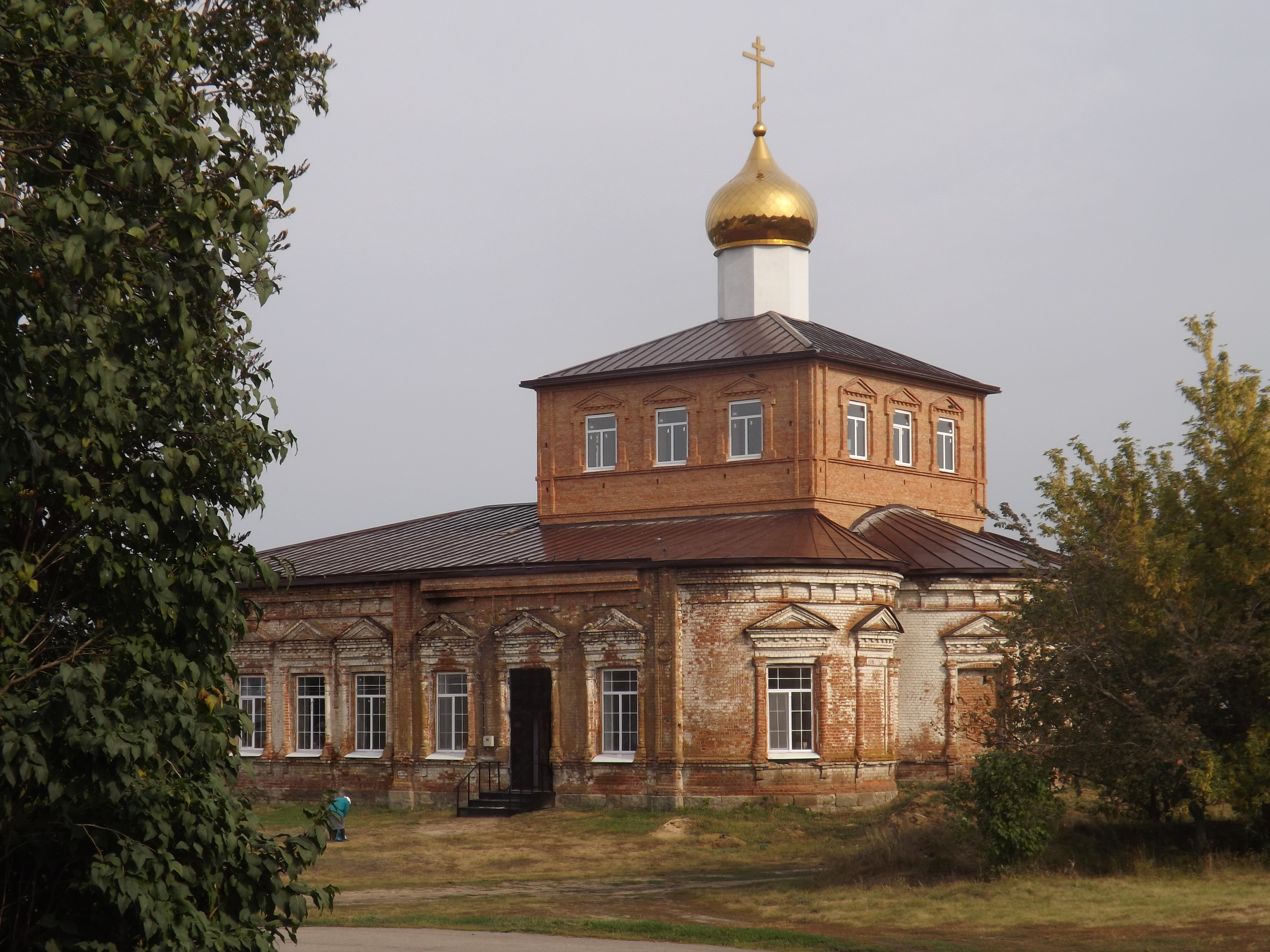
- Church of the Kazan Icon, Slastuha, Yekatrinovsky District

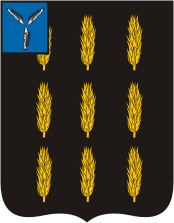
- Coat of arms
- Location of Yekaterinovsky District in Saratov Oblast
- Coordinates: 52°03′N 44°21′E
- Country: Russia
- Federal subject: Saratov Oblast
- Established: 23 July 1928
- Administrative center: Yekaterinovka

Area
  - Total: 3,000 km^{2} (1,200 sq mi)

Population (2010 Census)
  - Total: 19,798
  - Density: 6.6/km^{2} (17/sq mi)
  - Urban: 32.1%
  - Rural: 67.9%

Administrative structure
  - Inhabited localities: 1 urban-type settlements, 56 rural localities

Municipal structure
  - Municipally incorporated as: Yekaterinovsky Municipal District
  - Municipal divisions: 1 urban settlements, 11 rural settlements
- Time zone: UTC+4 (MSK+1)
- OKTMO ID: 63616000
- Website: http://ekaterinovka.sarmo.ru/

Yekaterinovsky District (Russian: Екатериновский райо́н) is an administrative and municipal district (raion), one of the thirty-eight in Saratov Oblast, Russia. It is located in the northwest of the oblast. The area of the district is 3,000 square kilometers (1,200 sq mi). Its administrative center is the urban locality (a work settlement) of Yekaterinovka. Population: 19,798 (2010 Census); 21,576 (2002 census); 23,649 (1989 Soviet census). The population of Yekaterinovka in 2010 accounted for 32.1% of the district's total population.
