= Semyonovka, Kamyshinsky District, Volgograd Oblast =

Semyonovka Семёновка
- Selo
- Location within Volgograd Oblast Location within Russia
- Coordinates: 50°29′N 45°19′E
- Country: Russia
- Region: Volgograd Oblast
- District: Kamyshinsky District
- Time zone: UTC+4:00

Semyonovka (Russian: Семёновка) is a rural locality (a selo) and the administrative center of Semyonovskoye Rural Settlement, Kamyshinsky District, Volgograd Oblast, Russia. The population was 1,023 as of 2010. There are 8 streets.

== Geography ==
Semyonovka is located on the Volga Upland, on the tight bank of the Semyonovka River, 60 km north of Kamyshin (the district's administrative centre) by road. Kalinovka is the nearest rural locality.
