= Yekaterinovka, Liskinsky District, Voronezh Oblast =

Yekaterinovka Екатериновка
- Sloboda
- Location within Voronezh Oblast Location within Russia
- Coordinates: 50°50′20″N 39°40′43″E
- Country: Russia
- Region: Voronezh Oblast
- District: Liskinsky District
- Time zone: UTC+3:00

Yekaterinovka (Russian: Екатериновка) is a rural locality (a sloboda) in Petrovskoye Rural Settlement, Liskinsky District, Voronezh Oblast, Russia. The population was 251 as of 2010. There are 3 streets.

== Geography ==
Yekaterinovka is located 22 km southeast of Liski (the district's administrative centre) by road. Petrovskoye is the nearest rural locality.
