= Khleb (group) =

Russian comedy music group

Khleb Хлеб
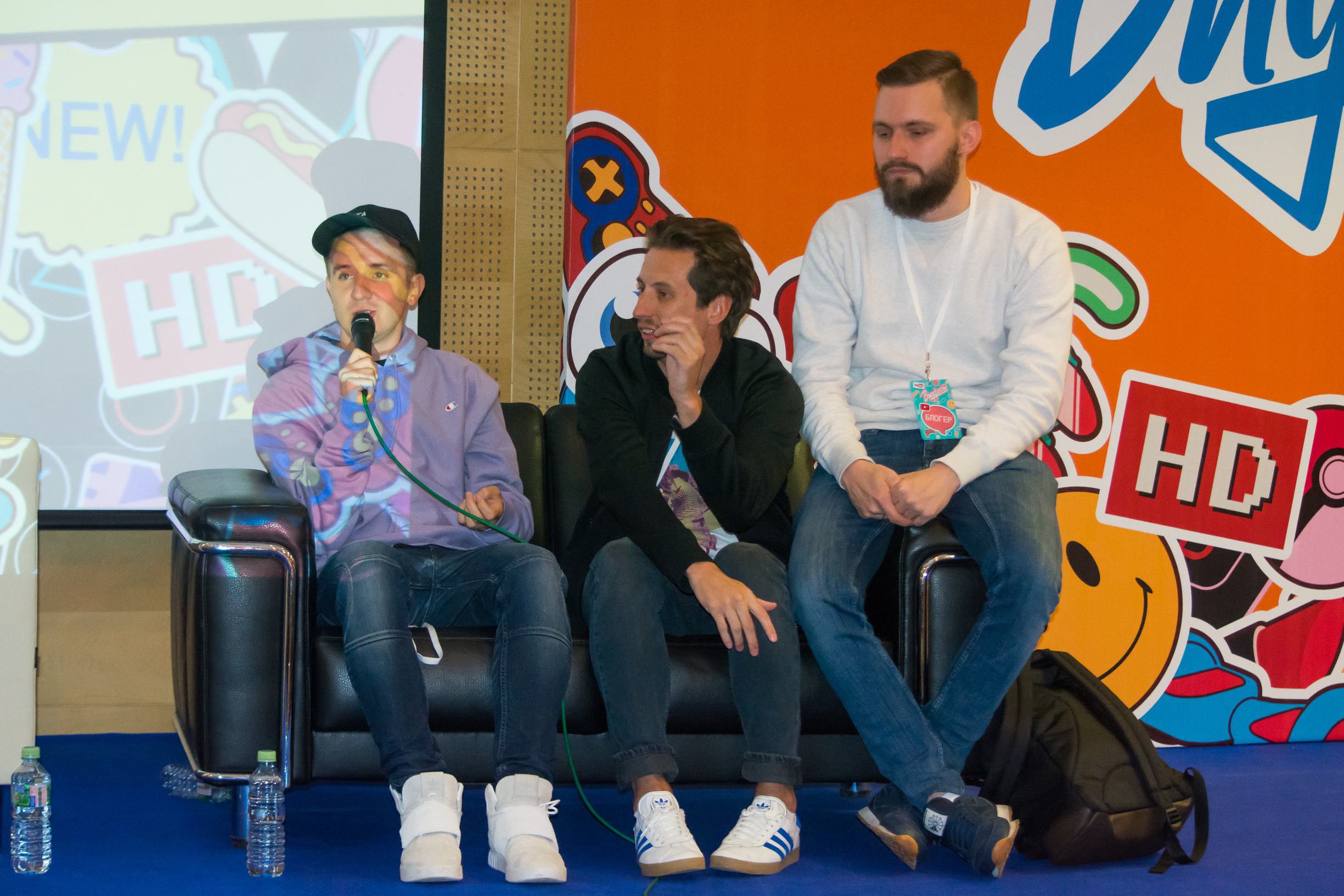

Background information
- Origin: Moscow, Russia
- Genres: Comedy hip hop; Russian hip hop; pop; trap
- Years active: 2013–present

Khleb (Russian: «Хлеб») is a Russian band, formed in 2013 by three vloggers who specialize in comedy rap. Despite the band's initial frivolity, by 2016 Khleb had become quite popular: their YouTube videos garner millions of views, and their concerts are held in major clubs.

== History of the group ==
The band's musical career began with humorous YouTube videos, the first of which were recorded by KOKA beats.

== Discography ==
=== Studio albums ===
- 2016 — "Белый"
- 2017 — "Пушка"
- 2019 — "Звёзды"
- 2023 — "Последний"
