= Semyonovka, Gorokhovetsky District, Vladimir Oblast =

Semyonovka Семёновка
- Village
- Location within Vladimir Oblast Location within Russia
- Coordinates: 56°09′N 42°50′E
- Country: Russia
- Region: Vladimir Oblast
- District: Gorokhovetsky District
- Time zone: UTC+3:00

Semyonovka (Russian: Семёновка) is a rural locality (a village) in Kupriyanovskoye Rural Settlement, Gorokhovetsky District, Vladimir Oblast, Russia. The population was 6 as of 2010.

== Geography ==
Semyonovka is located 12 km southeast of Gorokhovets (the district's administrative centre) by road. Velikovo is the nearest rural locality.
