= Tsaritsa (album) =

Studio album by Anna Asti
- Released: September 29, 2023
- Genres: Russian pop; Deep house
- Length: 34:33
- Language: Russian
- Label: Fenix Music

Professional ratings
Review scores
| Source | Rating |
|---|---|
| InterMedia | 8/10 |

Tsaritsa (Russian: «Цари́ца») is the second solo studio album by Russian-Ukrainian singer Anna Asti, released on 29 September 2023 through the label Fenix Music.
