= Semyonovka, Dubovsky District, Volgograd Oblast =

Semyonovka Семёновка
- Selo
- Location within Volgograd Oblast Location within Russia
- Coordinates: 49°31′N 44°37′E
- Country: Russia
- Region: Volgograd Oblast
- District: Dubovsky District
- Time zone: UTC+4:00

Semyonovka (Russian: Семёновка) is a rural locality (a selo) in Ust-Pogozhinskoye Rural Settlement, Dubovsky District, Volgograd Oblast, Russia. The population was 280 as of 2010. There are 4 streets.

== Geography ==
Semyonovka is located in steppe, on the Pogozhaya River, 72 km northwest of Dubovka (the district's administrative centre) by road. Ust-Pogozhye is the nearest rural locality.
