= Yekaterinovka, Ishimbaysky District, Republic of Bashkortostan =

Yekaterinovka Екатериновка
- Village
- Location within Bashkortostan Location within Russia
- Coordinates: 53°39′N 56°21′E
- Country: Russia
- Region: Bashkortostan
- District: Ishimbaysky District
- Time zone: UTC+5:00

Yekaterinovka (Russian: Екатериновка) is a rural locality (a village) in Yanurusovsky Selsoviet, Ishimbaysky District, Bashkortostan, Russia. The population was 21 as of 2010. There is 1 street.

== Geography ==
Yekaterinovka is located 46 km northeast of Ishimbay (the district's administrative centre) by road. Mikhaylovka is the nearest rural locality.
