= Kazinka, Belgorod Oblast =

Kazinka Казинка
- Selo
- Location within Belgorod Oblast Location within Russia
- Coordinates: 50°14′N 37°50′E
- Country: Russia
- Region: Belgorod Oblast
- District: Valuysky District
- Time zone: UTC+3:00

Kazinka (Russian: Казинка) is a rural locality (a selo) and the administrative center of Kazninskoye Rural Settlement, Valuysky District, Belgorod Oblast, Russia. The population was 1,020 as of 2010. There are 15 streets.

== Geography ==
Kazinka is located 22 km west of Valuyki (the district's administrative centre) by road. Posokhovo is the nearest rural locality.
