= Semyonovka, Meleuzovsky District, Republic of Bashkortostan =

Semyonovka Семёновка
- Village
- Location within Bashkortostan Location within Russia
- Coordinates: 53°15′N 55°51′E
- Country: Russia
- Region: Bashkortostan
- District: Meleuzovsky District
- Municipality: Zirgansky

Population (2010)
  - Total: 2
- Time zone: UTC+5:00
- Postal code: 453880

Semyonovka (Russian: Семёновка) is a rural locality (a village) in Zirgansky Selsoviet, Meleuzovsky District, Bashkortostan, Russia. The population was 2 as of 2010. There is 1 street.

== Geography ==
Semyonovka is located on the Barcha River, 41 km north of Meleuz (the district's administrative centre) by road, and 6 km north west of Zirgan.
