= Semyonovka, Chishminsky District, Republic of Bashkortostan =

Semyonovka Семёновка
- Village
- Location within Bashkortostan Location within Russia
- Coordinates: 54°27′N 55°44′E
- Country: Russia
- Region: Bashkortostan
- District: Chishminsky District
- Time zone: UTC+5:00

Semyonovka (Russian: Семёновка) is a rural locality (a village) in Yengalyshevsky Selsoviet, Chishminsky District, Bashkortostan, Russia. The population was 44 as of 2010.

== Geography ==
Semyonovka is located 47 km southeast of Chishmy (the district's administrative centre) by road. Balagushevo is the nearest rural locality.
