= Semyonovka, Gus-Khrustalny District, Vladimir Oblast =

Semyonovka Семёновка
- Village
- Location within Vladimir Oblast Location within Russia
- Coordinates: 55°43′N 40°56′E
- Country: Russia
- Region: Vladimir Oblast
- District: Gus-Khrustalny District
- Time zone: UTC+3:00

Semyonovka (Russian: Семёновка) is a rural locality (a village) in Posyolok Krasnoye Ekho, Gus-Khrustalny District, Vladimir Oblast, Russia. The population was 595 as of 2010. There are 5 streets.

== Geography ==
Semyonovka is located 26 km northeast of Gus-Khrustalny (the district's administrative centre) by road. Pervomaysky is the nearest rural locality.
