= Yekaterinovka, Yekaterinovsky District, Saratov Oblast =

Yekaterinovka Екатериновка
- Urban-type settlement
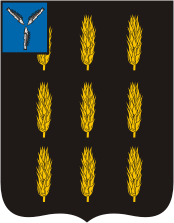
- Coat of arms
- Interactive map of Yekaterinovka
- Location of Yekaterinovka Yekaterinovka (Saratov Oblast)
- Coordinates: 52.0522°N 44.3512°E
- Country: Russia
- Federal subject: Saratov Oblast
- Administrative district: Yekaterinovsky District
- Founded: 1871

Population (2010 Census)
  - Total: 6,364
  - Estimate (2021): 5,817 (−8.6%)
- Time zone: UTC+4 (MSK+1)
- Postal code: 412120
- OKTMO ID: 63616151051

Yekaterinovka (Russian: Екатериновка) is an urban locality (an urban-type settlement) in Yekaterinovsky District of Saratov Oblast, Russia. Population: 6,364 (2010 census); 6,483 (2002 census); 6,722 (1989 Soviet census).
