= Yekaterinovka, Kulundinsky District, Altai Krai =

Yekaterinovka Екатериновка
- Selo
- Location within Altai Krai Location within Russia
- Coordinates: 52°33′N 79°36′E
- Country: Russia
- Region: Altai Krai
- District: Kulundinsky District
- Time zone: UTC+7:00

Yekaterinovka (Russian: Екатериновка) is a rural locality (a selo) in Ananyevsky Selsoviet, Kulundinsky District, Altai Krai, Russia. The population was 179 as of 2013. There are 2 streets.

== Geography ==
Yekaterinovka is located 59 km east of Kulunda (the district's administrative centre) by road. Ananyevka is the nearest rural locality.
