= Yekaterinovka, Vladimir Oblast =

Yekaterinovka Екатериновка
- Village
- Location within Vladimir Oblast Location within Russia
- Coordinates: 55°55′N 41°54′E
- Country: Russia
- Region: Vladimir Oblast
- District: Selivanovsky District
- Time zone: UTC+3:00

Yekaterinovka (Russian: Екатериновка) is a rural locality (a village) in Chertkovskoye Rural Settlement, Selivanovsky District, Vladimir Oblast, Russia. The population was 9 as of 2010.

== Geography ==
Yekaterinovka is located 9 km west from Chertkovo, 18 km northeast of Krasnaya Gorbatka (the district's administrative centre) by road. Chernovskaya is the nearest rural locality.
