= Semyonovka, Kalacheyevsky District, Voronezh Oblast =

Semyonovka Семёновка
- Selo
- Location within Voronezh Oblast Location within Russia
- Coordinates: 50°25′N 40°35′E
- Country: Russia
- Region: Voronezh Oblast
- District: Kalacheyevsky District
- Time zone: UTC+3:00

Semyonovka (Russian: Семёновка) is a rural locality (a selo) and the administrative center of Semyonovskoye Rural Settlement, Kalacheyevsky District, Voronezh Oblast, Russia. The population was 666 as of 2010. There are 7 streets.

== Geography ==
Semyonovka is located 36 km west of Kalach (the district's administrative centre) by road. Rossokhovatoye is the nearest rural locality.
