= Semyonovka, Kikvidzensky District, Volgograd Oblast =

Semyonovka Семёновка
- Selo
- Location within Volgograd Oblast Location within Russia
- Coordinates: 50°47′N 43°09′E
- Country: Russia
- Region: Volgograd Oblast
- District: Kikvidzensky District
- Time zone: UTC+4:00

Semyonovka (Russian: Семёновка) is a rural locality (a selo) in Ozerkinskoye Rural Settlement, Kikvidzensky District, Volgograd Oblast, Russia. The population was 509 as of 2010. There are 4 streets.

== Geography ==
Semyonovka is located on Khopyorsko-Buzulukskaya plain, on the right bank of the Buzuluk River, 15 km northeast of Preobrazhenskaya (the district's administrative centre) by road. Peschanovka is the nearest rural locality.
