= Yekaterinovka, Belgorod Oblast =

Yekaterinovka Екатериновка
- Khutor
- Location within Belgorod Oblast Location within Russia
- Coordinates: 50°24′N 37°35′E
- Country: Russia
- Region: Belgorod Oblast
- District: Volokonovsky District
- Time zone: UTC+3:00

Yekaterinovka (Russian: Екатериновка) is a rural locality (a khutor) in Volokonovsky District, Belgorod Oblast, Russia. The population was 113 as of 2010. There are 3 streets.

== Geography ==
Yekaterinovka is located 26 km southwest of Volokonovka (the district's administrative centre) by road. Shakhovka is the nearest rural locality.
