= Semyonovka, Svobodnensky District, Amur Oblast =

Semyonovka Семёновка
- Selo
- Location within Amur Oblast Location within Russia
- Coordinates: 51°31′N 127°45′E
- Country: Russia
- Region: Amur Oblast
- District: Svobodnensky District
- Time zone: UTC+9:00

Semyonovka (Russian: Семёновка) is a rural locality (a selo) and the administrative center of Semyonovsky Selsoviet of Svobodnensky District, Amur Oblast, Russia. The population was 327 as of 2018. There are 5 streets.

== Geography ==
Semyonovka is located 38 km northwest of Svobodny (the district's administrative centre) by road. Sukromli and Markuchi are the nearest rural localities.
