= Yekaterinovka, Kursky District, Kursk Oblast =

Rural locality in Kursk Oblast, Russia

Yekaterinovka Екатериновка
- Village
- Interactive map of Yekaterinovka
- Location of Yekaterinovka Yekaterinovka (Kursk Oblast)
- Coordinates: 51°34′14″N 36°03′30″E
- Country: Russia
- Federal subject: Kursk Oblast
- Administrative district: Kursky District
- SelsovietSelsoviet: Novoposelenovsky

Population (2010 Census)
  - Total: 124
  - Estimate (2010): 124 (0%)

Municipal status
  - Municipal district: Kursky Municipal District
  - Rural settlement: Novoposelenovsky Selsoviet Rural Settlement
- Time zone: UTC+3 (MSK)
- Postal code: 305528
- Dialing code: +7 4712
- OKTMO ID: 38620452116
- Website: novoposel.rkursk.ru

Yekaterinovka (Russian: Екатериновка) is a rural locality (Russian: деревня, lit. 'village') in Novoposelenovsky Selsoviet Rural Settlement, Kursky District, Kursk Oblast, Russia. Population: 124 (2010 census); 105 (2002 census);

== Geography ==
The village is located 74 km from the Russia–Ukraine border, 19 km south-west of Kursk, 7 km from the selsoviet center – 1st Tsvetovo.

Climate

Yekaterinovka has a warm-summer humid continental climate (Dfb in the Köppen climate classification).

== Transport ==
Yekaterinovka is located 1 km from the federal route M-2 Crimea Highway (a part of the European route E105), 0.5 km from the road of regional importance 38K-010 ("Crimea Highway" – Ivanino, part of the European route E38), on the road of intermunicipal significance 38H-208 ("Crimea Highway" – Yekaterinovka), 8 km from the nearest railway halt and passing loop 454 km (railway line Lgov I — Kursk).

The rural locality is situated 26 km from Kursk Vostochny Airport, 108 km from Belgorod International Airport and 221 km from Voronezh Peter the Great Airport.
