= Semyonovka, Bureysky District, Amur Oblast =

Semyonovka Семёновка
- Selo
- Location within Amur Oblast Location within Russia
- Coordinates: 50°04′N 129°49′E
- Country: Russia
- Region: Amur Oblast
- District: Bureysky District
- Time zone: UTC+9:00

Semyonovka (Russian: Семёновка) is a rural locality (a selo) in Rodionovsky Selsoviet of Bureysky District, Amur Oblast, Russia. The population was 249 as of 2018. There are three streets.

== Geography ==
Semyonovka is located north-east from R297 highway, 39 km (24 mi) north of Novobureysky (the district's administrative centre) by road. Tryokhrechye is the nearest rural locality.
