= Semyonovka, Konyshyovsky District, Kursk Oblast =

Rural locality in Kursk Oblast, Russia

Semyonovka Семёновка
- Village
- Interactive map of Semyonovka
- Location of Semyonovka Semyonovka (Kursk Oblast)
- Coordinates: 51°50′07″N 35°00′49″E
- Country: Russia
- Federal subject: Kursk Oblast
- Administrative district: Konyshyovsky District
- SelsovietSelsoviet: Platavsky
- Elevation: 149 m (489 ft)

Population (2010 Census)
  - Total: 73
  - Estimate (2010): 73 (0%)

Municipal status
  - Municipal district: Konyshyovsky Municipal District
  - Rural settlement: Platavsky Selsoviet Rural Settlement
- Time zone: UTC+3 (MSK)
- Postal code: 307634
- Dialing code: +7 47156
- OKTMO ID: 38616436121
- Website: platavskii.ru

Semyonovka (Russian: Семёновка) is a rural locality (Russian: деревня, lit. 'village') in Platavsky Selsoviet Rural Settlement, Konyshyovsky District, Kursk Oblast, Russia. Population: 73 (2010 census); 120 (2002 census);

== Geography ==
The village is located in the Suzhavitsa River basin (a left tributary of the Svapa River), 40 km from the Russia–Ukraine border, 82 km north-west of Kursk, 19 km south-west of the district center – the urban-type settlement Konyshyovka, 4.5 km from the selsoviet center – Kashara.

Climate

Semyonovka has a warm-summer humid continental climate (Dfb in the Köppen climate classification).

Climate data for Semyonovka
Month	Jan	Feb	Mar	Apr	May	Jun	Jul	Aug	Sep	Oct	Nov	Dec	Year
Mean daily maximum °C (°F)	−3.7 (25.3)	−2.7 (27.1)	3.2 (37.8)	13.2 (55.8)	19.5 (67.1)	22.8 (73.0)	25.3 (77.5)	24.6 (76.3)	18.3 (64.9)	10.7 (51.3)	3.6 (38.5)	−0.9 (30.4)	11.2 (52.1)
Daily mean °C (°F)	−5.8 (21.6)	−5.3 (22.5)	−0.4 (31.3)	8.4 (47.1)	14.8 (58.6)	18.5 (65.3)	20.9 (69.6)	20 (68)	14.1 (57.4)	7.4 (45.3)	1.4 (34.5)	−2.8 (27.0)	7.6 (45.7)
Mean daily minimum °C (°F)	−8.2 (17.2)	−8.4 (16.9)	−4.5 (23.9)	3 (37)	9.2 (48.6)	13.2 (55.8)	15.9 (60.6)	14.9 (58.8)	9.9 (49.8)	4.1 (39.4)	−0.8 (30.6)	−5 (23)	3.6 (38.5)
Average precipitation mm (inches)	49 (1.9)	44 (1.7)	48 (1.9)	50 (2.0)	64 (2.5)	70 (2.8)	79 (3.1)	54 (2.1)	57 (2.2)	56 (2.2)	48 (1.9)	48 (1.9)	667 (26.2)
Source: https://en.climate-data.org/asia/russian-federation/kursk-oblast/semenovka-654492/

== Transport ==
Semyonovka is located 40 km from the federal route M-3 Ukraine Highway, 61 km from the route M-2 Crimea Highway, 28.5 km from the route A-142 (Trosna – M3 highway), 27 km from the road of regional importance 38K-038 (Fatezh – Dmitriyev), 19 km from the road 38K-005 (Konyshyovka – Zhigayevo – 38K-038), 12 km from the road 38K-003 (Dmitriyev – Beryoza – Menshikovo – Khomutovka), 15.5 km from the road 38K-023 (Lgov – Konyshyovka), on the road of intermunicipal significance 38Н-132 (Kashara – Gryady), 18.5 km from the nearest railway halt Maritsa (railway line Navlya – Lgov-Kiyevsky).

The rural locality is situated 88 km from Kursk Vostochny Airport, 170 km from Belgorod International Airport and 290 km from Voronezh Peter the Great Airport.
