= Semyonovka, Republic of Buryatia =

Semyonovka Семёновка
- Selo
- Location within Republic of Buryatia Location within Russia
- Coordinates: 50°09′N 107°20′E
- Country: Russia
- Region: Republic of Buryatia
- District: Kyakhtinsky District
- Time zone: UTC+8:00

Semyonovka (Russian: Семёновка) is a rural locality (a selo) in Kyakhtinsky District, Republic of Buryatia, Russia. The population was 89 as of 2010. There are 2 streets.

== Geography ==
Semyonovka is located 86 km southeast of Kyakhta (the district's administrative centre) by road. Kudara-Somon is the nearest rural locality.
