= Semenivka =

Semenivka (Ukrainian: Семенівка) is the name of various locations in Ukraine:

- Semenivka, Chernihiv Oblast, a city in the Chernihiv Oblast
- Semenivka, Donetsk Oblast, a village in the Donetsk Oblast
- Semenivka, Poltava Oblast, an urban-type settlement in the Poltava Oblast
- Semenivka, a village and suburb of Kramatorsk in the Donetsk Oblast
- Seminivka, a river in Khmelnytskyi Oblast, right tributary of Poltva
