= Flower Duet =

Flower Duet may refer to:

- "Dôme épais le jasmin", a duet from Léo Delibes' opera Lakmé known as the Flower Duet
- "Il cannone del porto!", a duet from Giacomo Puccini's opera Madama Butterfly known as the Flower Duet
