= Streletskoye =

Streletskoye Стрелецкое
- Selo
- Location within Belgorod Oblast Location within Russia
- Coordinates: 50°38′N 36°28′E
- Country: Russia
- Region: Belgorod Oblast
- District: Belgorodsky District
- Time zone: UTC+3:00

Streletskoye (Russian: Стрелецкое) is a rural locality (a selo) in Belgorodsky District, Belgorod Oblast, Russia. The population was 6,862 as of 2010. There are 90 streets.

== Geography ==
Streletskoye is located 16 km north of Maysky (the district's administrative centre) by road. Dragunskoye is the nearest rural locality.
