= Kinel-Cherkassky District =

Kinel-Cherkassky District Кинель-Черкасский район (Russian)
- District
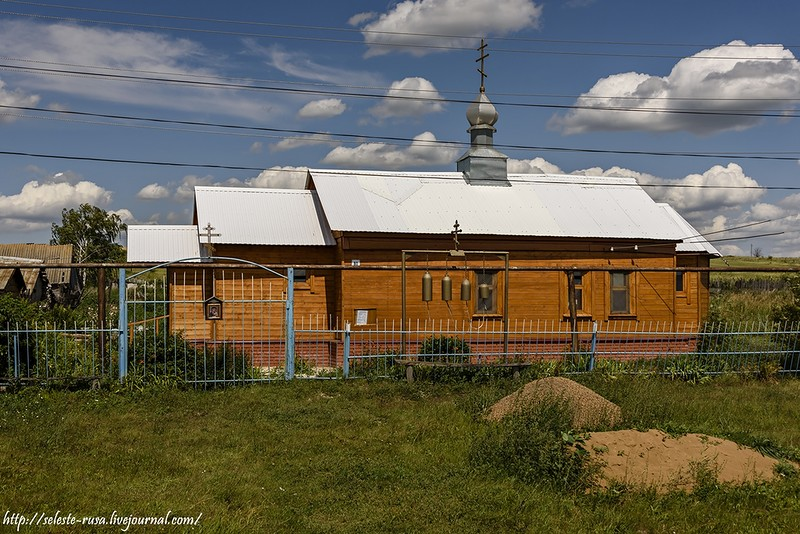
- Church in Bogorodskoe, Kinel-Cherkassky District

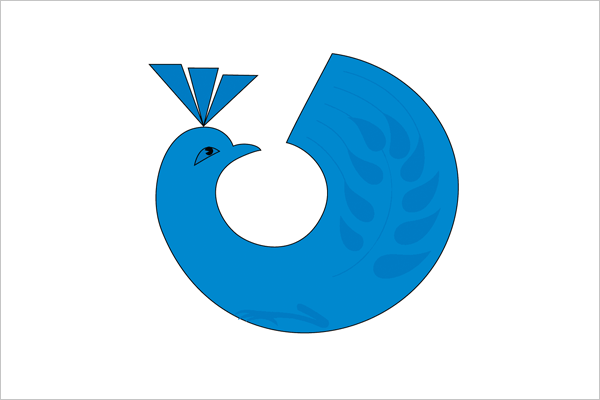
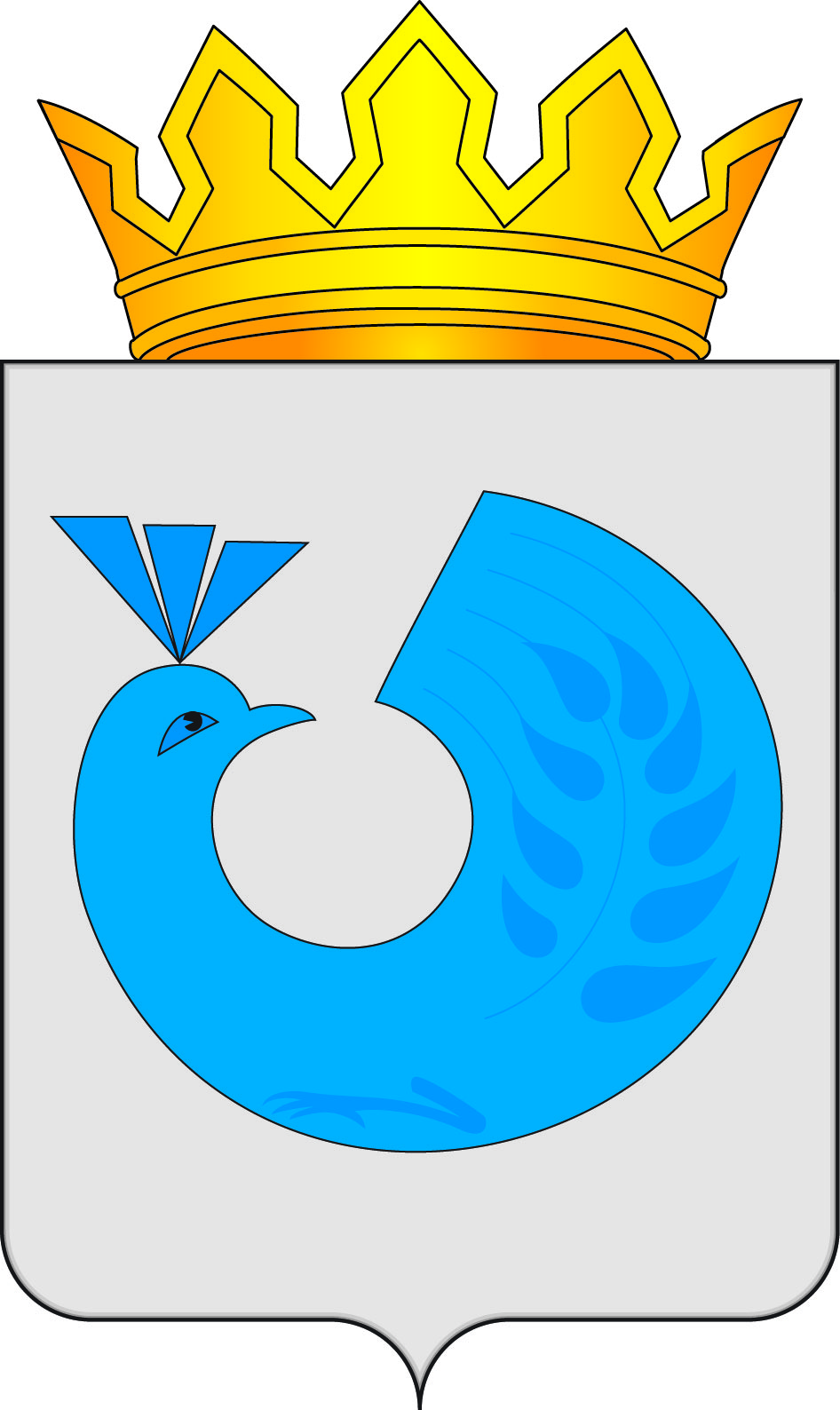
- Flag Coat of arms
- Location of Kinel-Cherkassky District in Samara Oblast
- Coordinates: 53°27′N 51°26′E
- Country: Russia
- Federal subject: Samara Oblast
- Established: 16 July 1928
- Administrative center: Kinel-Cherkassy

Area
  - Total: 2,469 km^{2} (953 sq mi)

Population (2010 Census)
  - Total: 47,362
  - Density: 19.18/km^{2} (49.68/sq mi)
  - Urban: 0%
  - Rural: 100%

Administrative structure
  - Inhabited localities: 50 rural localities

Municipal structure
  - Municipally incorporated as: Kinel-Cherkassky Municipal District
  - Municipal divisions: 0 urban settlements, 13 rural settlements
- Time zone: UTC+4 (MSK+1)
- OKTMO ID: 36620000
- Website: http://www.kinel-cherkassy.ru/

Kinel-Cherkassky District (Russian: Кинель-Черкасский райо́н) is an administrative and municipal district (raion), one of the twenty-seven in Samara Oblast, Russia. It is located in the east of the oblast. The area of the district is 2,469 square kilometers (953 sq mi). Its administrative center is the rural locality (a selo) of Kinel-Cherkassy. Population: 47,362 (2010 Census); 48,922 (2002 census); 51,193 (1989 Soviet census). The population of Kinel-Cherkassy accounts for 36.4% of the district's total population.
