= Anna Asti =

Ukrainian-Russian singer (born 1990)

Anna Asti Анна Асти
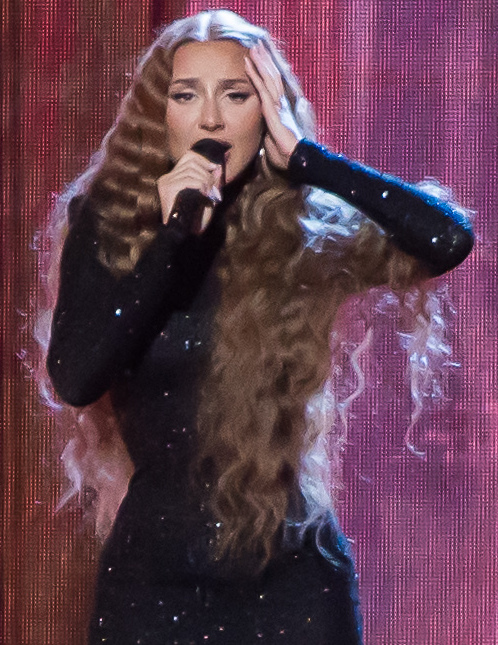
- Asti in 2025

Background information
- Born: Anna Anatolyevna Dzyuba; 24 June 1990 (age 36); Cherkasy, Ukrainian SSR, Soviet Union
- Origin: Kyiv, Ukraine
- Genre: Russian pop
- Occupation: Singer
- Years active: 2007–present
- Label: Universal Music Russia (2022) Fenix Music (2023–present)
- Formerly of: Artik & Asti (2010–2021)

Anna Anatolyevna Dzyuba (Russian: Анна Анатольевна Дзюба; Ukrainian: Ганна Анатоліївна Дзюба, romanized: Hanna Anatoliivna Dzyuba; born 24 June 1990), known professionally as Anna Asti, is a Ukrainian and Russian singer.

From 2010 to 2021, she was the soloist of the Ukrainian musical duo Artik & Asti. In 2022, she began her solo career, releasing several singles and a debut album, which became popular in Russia.

== Career ==
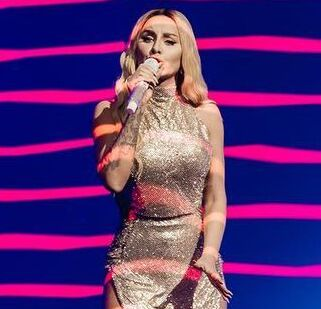
Anna Asti performing at the Zhara Music Awards in 2022

=== Artik and Asti: 2010–2021 ===
In 2010, producer Artem Umrikhin thought about creating a new musical project — Artik & Asti. On the internet, he came across Anna's recording and offered her his cooperation. In a music studio in Kyiv, they recorded their first joint composition "Antistress".

In 2011, they moved to Moscow. After realising their second studio album Zdes' i Seachas (Here and Now) the group gained great popularity: the album was recognized as one of the most popular in 2015 according to Yandex Music.

In 2020, Anna opened a beauty salon "3.33 by ASTI" in Moscow.

In 2023, she opened a bar “Spletny by Anna Asti” in Saint Petersburg.

=== Solo career: 2022–present ===
On 2 November 2021, Artik announced that Anna Asti left the band. Since leaving the band, Dzyuba has started her own solo career.

On 14 January 2022, the singer released her debut solo single and video clip "Feniks". On 29 April, she released collaboration "Khobbi" with Philipp Kirkorov.

In 2026, she was featured as a coach on the fourteenth season of The Voice Russia.

== Personal life ==
Anna Dzyuba was born in Cherkasy. In December 2020, Dzyuba secretly married entrepreneur Stanislav Yurkin.

The singer was visiting Ukraine when in February 2022 Russian troops launched an invasion of Ukraine. She spent a few days in a bomb shelter with her husband. She soon returned to Russia. She never publicly spoke out against the invasion and never publicly provided help to Ukrainian victims of the war.

In 2023, she took Russian citizenship. Following the March 2024 Crocus City Hall attack in Moscow Oblast, she donated more than $10,000 to help the families of those killed and injured and called on her fans to also donate.

== Discography ==
Studio albums

- Feniks (2022)
- Tsaritsa (2023)
- Vysshiye sily (2025)
