= Yenotayevka =

Rural locality in Astrakhan Oblast, Russia

Coordinates: 47°15′N 47°02′E

Yenotayevka (Russian: Енота́евка) is a rural locality (a selo) and the administrative center of Yenotayevsky District of Astrakhan Oblast, Russia. Population: 7,616 (2010 census); 9,022 (2002 census); 7,836 (1989 Soviet census).
