= Yenotayevsky District =

Yenotayevsky District Енотаевский район (Russian)
- District
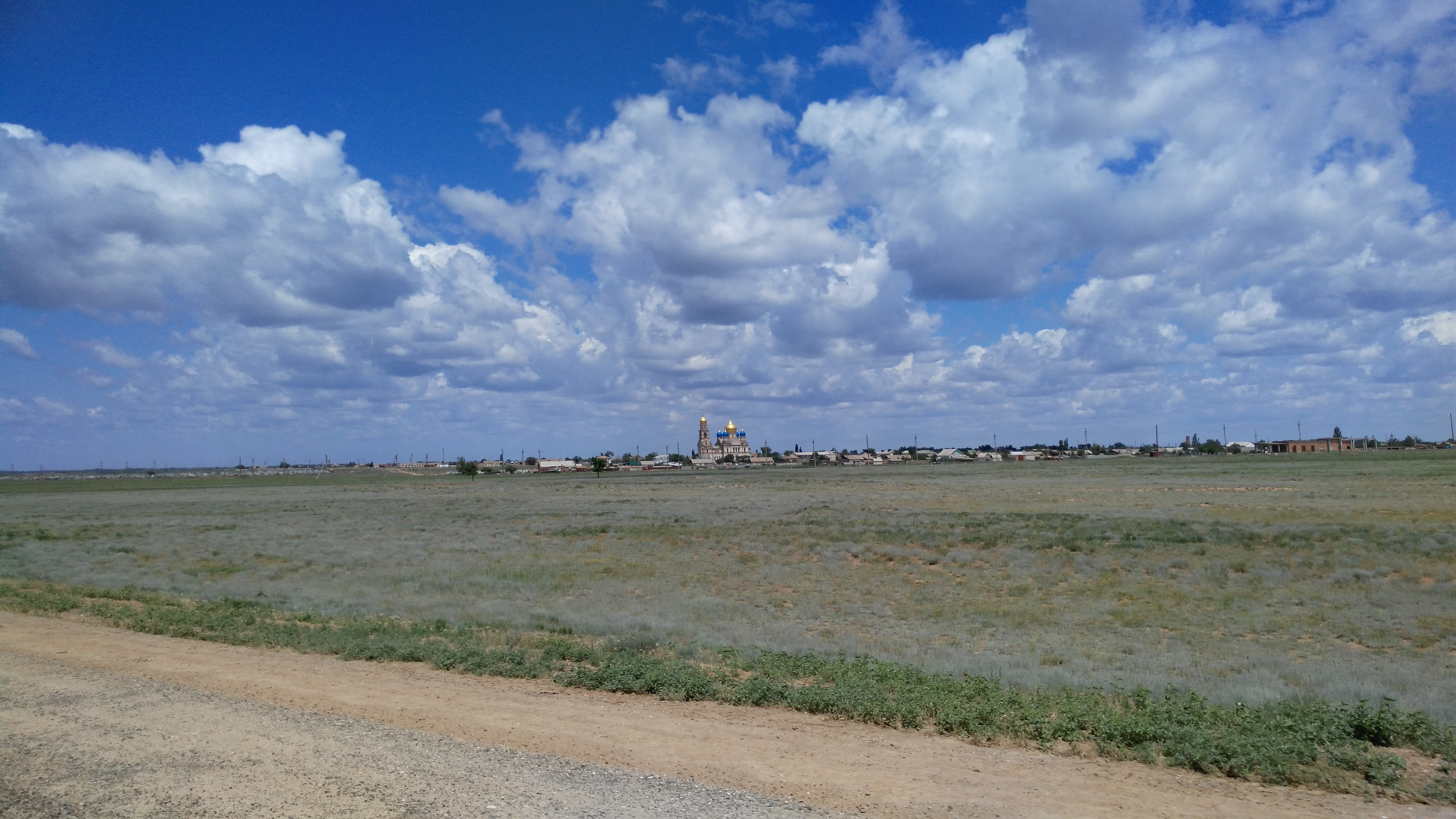
- Nikolskoye Village, Yenotayevsky District

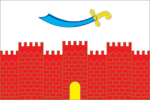
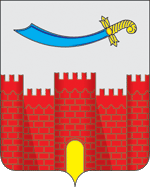
- Flag Coat of arms
- Location of Yenotayevsky District in Astrakhan Oblast
- Coordinates: 47°14′37″N 47°01′58″E
- Country: Russia
- Federal subject: Astrakhan Oblast
- Established: 1925
- Administrative center: Yenotayevka

Area
  - Total: 6,300 km^{2} (2,400 sq mi)

Population (2010 Census)
  - Total: 26,786
  - Density: 4.3/km^{2} (11/sq mi)
  - Urban: 0%
  - Rural: 100%

Administrative structure
  - Administrative divisions: 14 Selsoviets
  - Inhabited localities: 27 rural localities

Municipal structure
  - Municipally incorporated as: Yenotayevsky Municipal District
  - Municipal divisions: 0 urban settlements, 14 rural settlements
- Time zone: UTC+4 (MSK+1)
- OKTMO ID: 12615000
- Website: http://enotaevka.astranet.ru/

Yenotayevsky District (Russian: Енота́евский райо́н) is an administrative and municipal district (raion), one of the eleven in Astrakhan Oblast, Russia. It is located in the west of the oblast. The area of the district is 6,300 square kilometers (2,400 sq mi). Its administrative center is the rural locality (a selo) of Yenotayevka. Population: 26,786 (2010 census); 27,625 (2002 Census); 29,093 (1989 Soviet census). The population of Yenotayevka accounts for 28.4% of the district's total population.
