= Polina Gagarina discography =

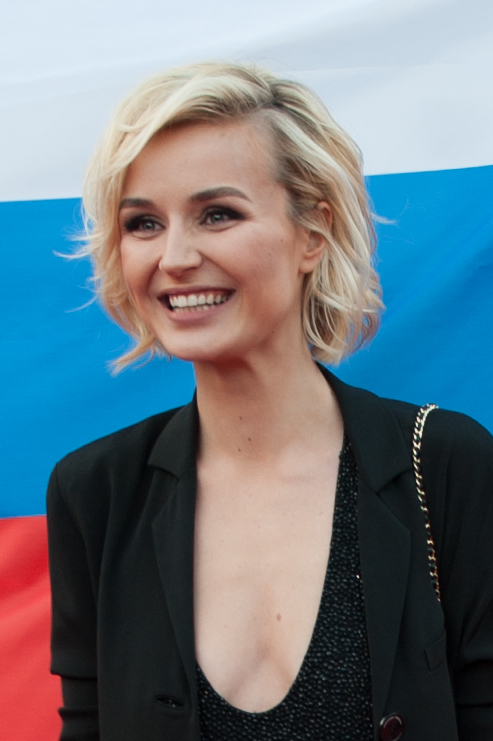
- Gagarina in 2015.
- Studio albums: 4
- Singles: 33
- Music videos: 32

The discography of Polina Gagarina, a Russian singer-songwriter, consists of four studio albums and 33 singles. She represented Russia at the 2015 Eurovision Song Contest in Vienna, Austria, with the song "A Million Voices", coming second in the final with 303 points.

Her debut album, Poprosi u oblakov, was released in 2007. It included her first single, "Kolybelnaya", alongside "Ya tvoya", "Morning" and "Ya tebya ne proschu nikogda". Her next album, O sebe, featured the singles "Lyubov pod solntsem", "Gde-to zhivyot lyubov", "Komu, zachem?" (alongside Irina Dubtsova) and "Propadi vsyo". Her third album, 9, released in 2016, involved "Day", "Tantsuy so mnoy" and "Stanu solntsem". Other high-profile singles include "Spektakl okonchen", "Net", "Navek" and "Shagay".

== Albums ==
Title	Details
Попроси у облаков (Ask the Clouds)	Released: 12 July 2007; Label: APC Records; Format: CD, Digital Distribution
О себе (About Me)	Released: 11 March 2010; Label: APC Records; Format: CD, Digital Distribution
9	Released: 9 September 2016; Label: Gazgolder; Format: CD, Digital Distribution
Вдох (Breath)	Released: 25 November 2022; Label: Полина Гагарина; Format: Digital Distribution

== Singles ==
Title	Year	Peak chart positions											Album
Title	Year	RUS	RUS Airplay	BEL (VL)	BEL (WA)	GER	IRE	NLD	SWE	SWI	UK	UKR Airplay	Album
"Колыбельная" ("Lullaby")	2005	—	—	—	—	—	—	—	—	—	—	—	Попроси у облаков
"Я твоя" ("I'm Yours")	2006	—	—	—	—	—	—	—	—	—	—	—	Попроси у облаков
"Morning"	2006	—	—	—	—	—	—	—	—	—	—	—	Попроси у облаков
"Я тебя не прощу никогда" ("I'll Never Forgive You")	2007	—	—	—	—	—	—	—	—	—	—	—	Попроси у облаков
"Любовь под солнцем" ("Love Under the Sun")	2007	—	17	—	—	—	—	—	—	—	—	—	О себе
"Где-то живёт любовь" ("Love Lives Somewhere")	2008	—	—	—	—	—	—	—	—	—	—	—	О себе
"Кому, зачем?" ("To Whom, for What?") (duet with Irina Dubtsova)	2008	—	—	—	—	—	—	—	—	—	—	—	О себе
"Пропади всё" ("Damn It All")	2009	—	—	—	—	—	—	—	—	—	—	—	О себе
"Я обещаю" ("I Promise")	2010	—	—	—	—	—	—	—	—	—	—	—	Non-album singles
"Осколки" ("Fragments")	2011	—	—	—	—	—	—	—	—	—	—	—	Non-album singles
"Спектакль окончен" ("The Play is Over")	2012	3	10	—	—	—	—	—	—	—	—	3	Non-album singles
"Нет" ("No")	2012	2	3	—	—	—	—	—	—	—	—	1	Non-album singles
"Навек" ("Forever")	2013	5	26	—	—	—	—	—	—	—	—	23	Non-album singles
"Шагай" ("Stride")	2014	—	15	—	—	—	—	—	—	—	—	15	Non-album singles
"A Million Voices"	2015	1	1	22	38	46	86	99	26	39	97	152	Non-album singles
"Кукушка" ("Cuckoo")	2015	2	—	—	—	—	—	—	—	—	—	—	Battle for Sevastopol OST
"Я не буду" ("I Will Not")	2015	—	52	—	—	—	—	—	—	—	—	—	Non-album single
"Не пара" ("Not a Couple")	2015	—	—	—	—	—	—	—	—	—	—	—	Hotel Transylvania 2 OST (Russian dub)
"Day"	2016	—	—	—	—	—	—	—	—	—	—	—	9
"Танцуй со мной" ("Dance With Me")	2016	—	82	—	—	—	—	—	—	—	—	—	9
"Стану солнцем" ("I will become the sun")	2016	—	82	—	—	—	—	—	—	—	—	—	9
"Драмы больше нет" ("Drama is gone")	2017	—	12	—	—	—	—	—	—	—	—	—	TBA
"Обезоружена" ("Disarmed")	2017	—	4	—	—	—	—	—	—	—	—	—	TBA
"Я обещаю" ("I promise") (new version)	2018	—	—	—	—	—	—	—	—	—	—	—	TBA
"Выше головы" ("Above your head")	2018	—	44	—	—	—	—	—	—	—	—	—	TBA
"Камень на сердце" ("Heart stone")	2018	—	40	—	—	—	—	—	—	—	—	—	TBA
"Меланхолия" ("Melancholy")	2018	—	18	—	—	—	—	—	—	—	—	—	TBA
"Ангелы в танце" ("Angels in dance")	2019	—	53	—	—	—	—	—	—	—	—	—	TBA
"Смотри" ("Look")	2019	—	6	—	—	—	—	—	—	—	—	—	TBA
"Ты не целуй" ("You don't kiss")	2020	—	68	—	—	—	—	—	—	—	—	—	TBA
"Небо в глазах" ("Sky in the eyes")	2020	—	22	—	—	—	—	—	—	—	—	—	TBA
"На расстоянии" ("On distance")	2020	—	—	—	—	—	—	—	—	—	—	—	TBA
"Зима" ("Winter")	2020	—	—	—	—	—	—	—	—	—	—	—	TBA
"Circles and Squares" (with Måns Zelmerlöw)	2021	—	—	—	—	—	—	—	183	—	—	—	World Figure Skating Championships 2021
"—" denotes a single that did not chart or was not released in that territory.

== Music videos ==
Title	Year	Director	Ref.
Колыбельная ("Lullaby")	2005	Vlad Opelyants	
Я твоя ("I'm Yours")	2006	Georgy Toidze	
Morning	2006	Irina Mironova	
Я тебя не прощу никогда ("I'll Never Forgive You")	2007	Semion Gorov	
Кому? Зачем? ("To Whom, for What?") (duet with Irina Dubtsova)	2009	Alexey Golubev	
Осколки ("Fragments")	2011	Natalia Merkulova	
Спектакль окончен ("The Play is Over")	2012	Sergei Solodskiy	
Нет ("No")	2012	Alan Badoev	
Навек ("Forever")	2013	Alan Badoev	
Immortal Feeling (from ballet "The Great Gatsby")	2014	Alan Badoev	
Шагай ("Stride")	2014	Sergei Solodskiy	
A Million Voices	2015	Alexey Golubev	
Больше снов ("More Dreams")	2015		
Любовь тебя найдёт ("Love Will Find You")	2015	Alexey Golubev	
Я не буду ("I Will Not")	2015	Alexey Golubev	
Не пара ("Not a couple")	2015	Alexey Golubev	
Day	2016	Alexey Golubev	
Голос ("Voice") (featuring Basta)	2016		
Танцуй со мной ("Dance with Me")	2016	Alexey Satolin	
Стану солнцем ("I will become the sun")	2017		
Ангел веры ("Angel of faith") (with Basta)	2017	Timofey Kolesnikov	
Команда ("Team") (with Egor and DJ SMASH)	2017	Alexey Golubev	
Драмы больше нет ("Drama is gone")	2017	Leonid Kolosovskiy	
Обезоружена ("Disarmed")	2017	Alexsey Kupriyanov	
В невесомости ("In zero gravity") (with Emin)	2018	Serghey Grey	
Путеводная звезда ("Guiding star") (Putin Team anthem)	2018		
Камень на сердце ("Heart stone")	2018	Leonid Kolosovskiy	
Выше головы ("Above your head")	2018	Alan Badoev	
Меланхолия ("Melancholy")	2019	Zaur Zaseev	
Смотри ("Look")	2019		
На расстоянии ("On distance")	2020	Medet Shayakhmetov	
Ты не целуй ("You don't kiss")	2020	Anton Rodin	
