= The Voice (Russian TV series) season 12 =

The Voice
- Season 12
- Presented by: Yana Churikova
- Coaches: Vladimir Presnyakov; Polina Gagarina; Zivert; Anton Belyaev
- Winner: Bogdan Shuvalov
- Winning coach: Polina Gagarina
- Runner-up: Georgy Russkikh

Release
- Original network: Channel One
- Original release: 19 January – 27 April 2024

Season chronology
- ← Previous; Season 11 Next → Season 13

The twelfth season of the Russian reality talent show The Voice premiered on January 19, 2024, on Channel One which is the second time that the show is not released in Fall season. Changes in the coaching panel saw as Vladimir Presnyakov, Polina Gagarina and Anton Belyaev returned from the previous season for their second, sixth and second seasons as coaches. Debuting coach Zivert is announced in replacing Basta. Yana Churikova returned as host of the program for her second season.

Bogdan Shuvalov was announced as the winner of the season, marking Polina Gagarina's third win as a coach, thus expanding her winning streak to two seasons in a row. With Shuvalov's win, Polina Gagarina became the second coach, after Alexander Gradsky, to win more than two seasons. Gagarina also became the first coach on the main version of the show to be both the "best coach" and the winning coach in the same season. Also, Shuvalov became the second winner, who had a block in the blind auditions, after Victoria Solomakhina in season 11 (Gagarina blocked Zivert).

== Coaches and host ==
On December 4, 2023, it was announced the new set of coaching panel whom are Polina Gagarina, Vladimir Presnyakov and Anton Belyaev, from previous season, and is joined by the first-timer coach Zivert, replacing Basta. This season marks the history in the entire Russian regular version of the show that the coaching panel features two female coaches.

Yana Churikova continued as the presenter of the show.

The Voice season 12 coaches and presenter

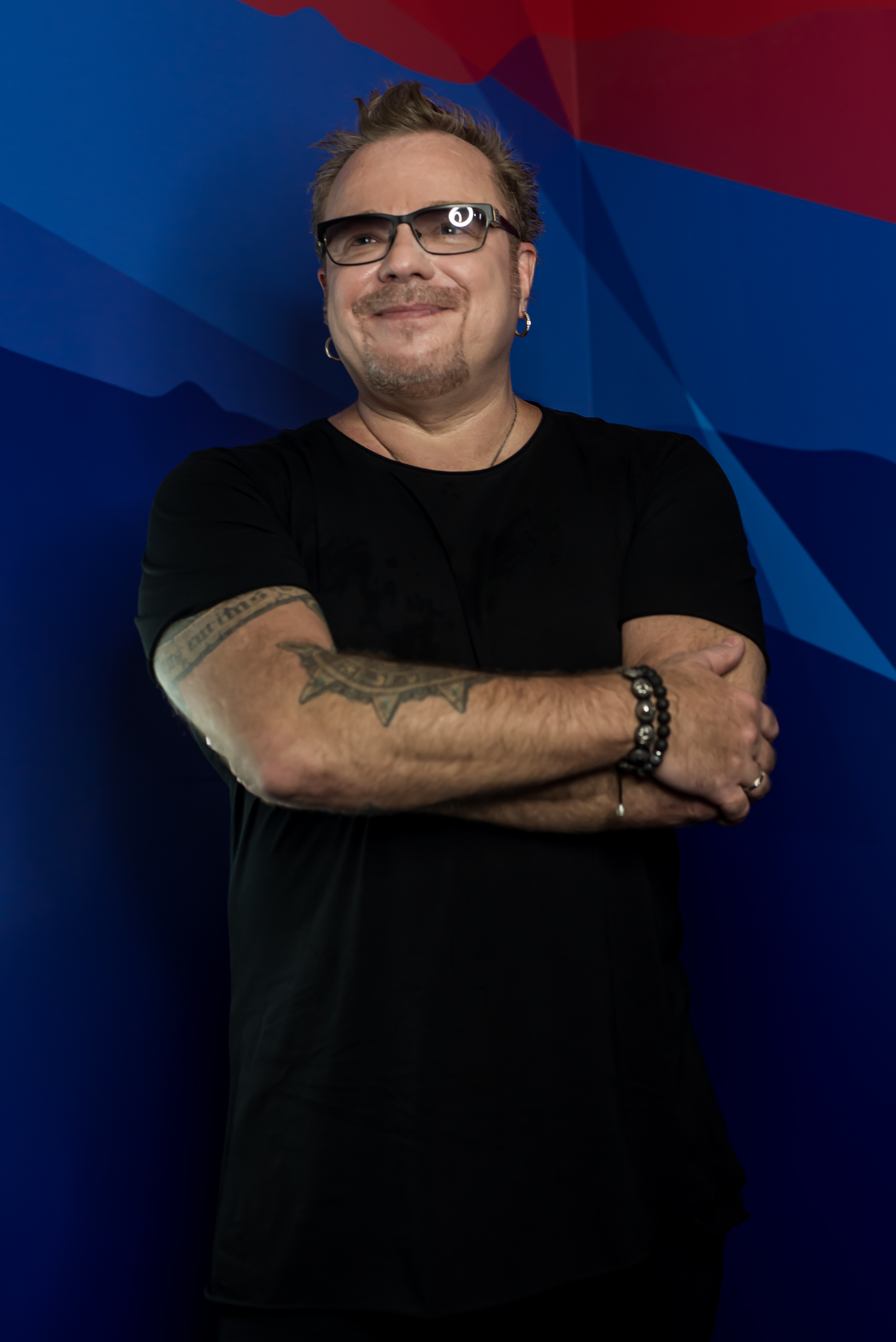
Vladimir Presnyakov

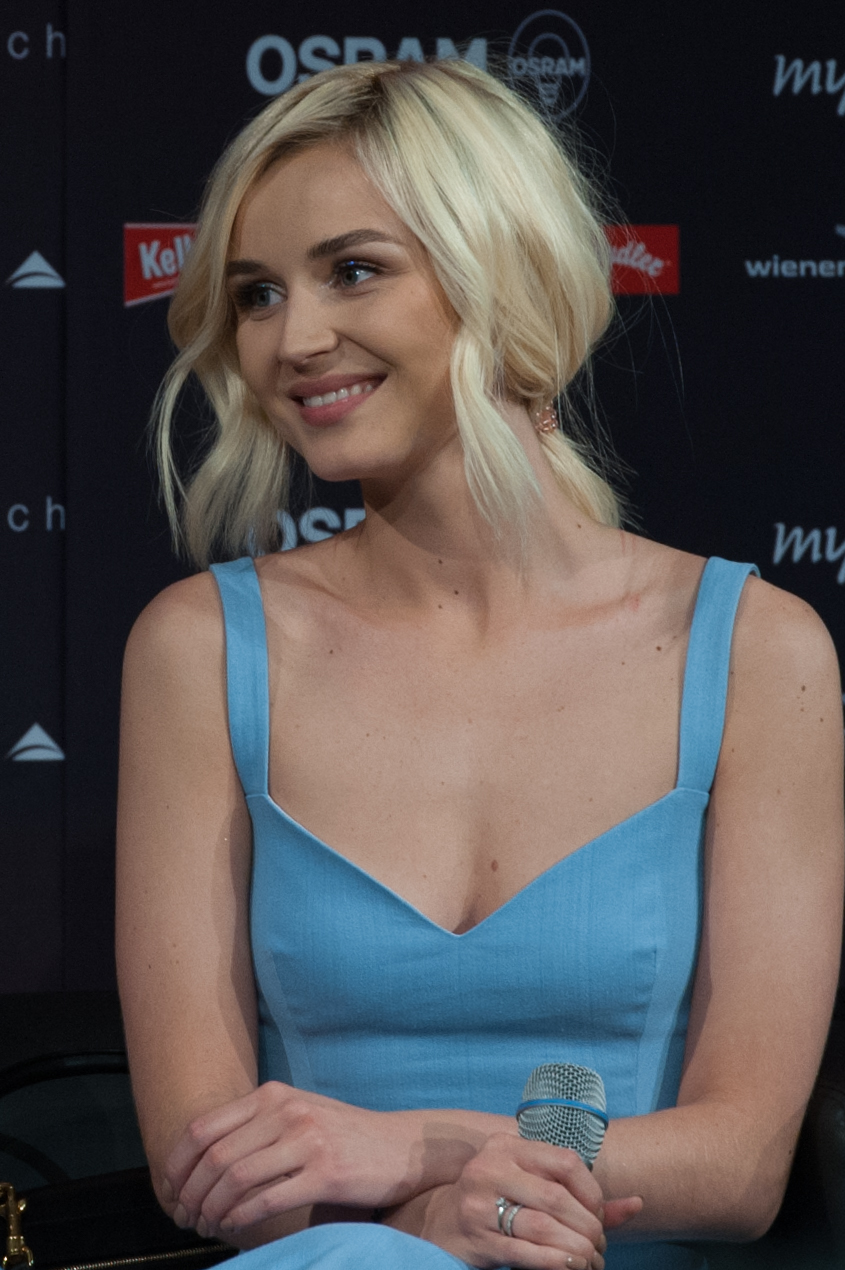
Polina Gagarina

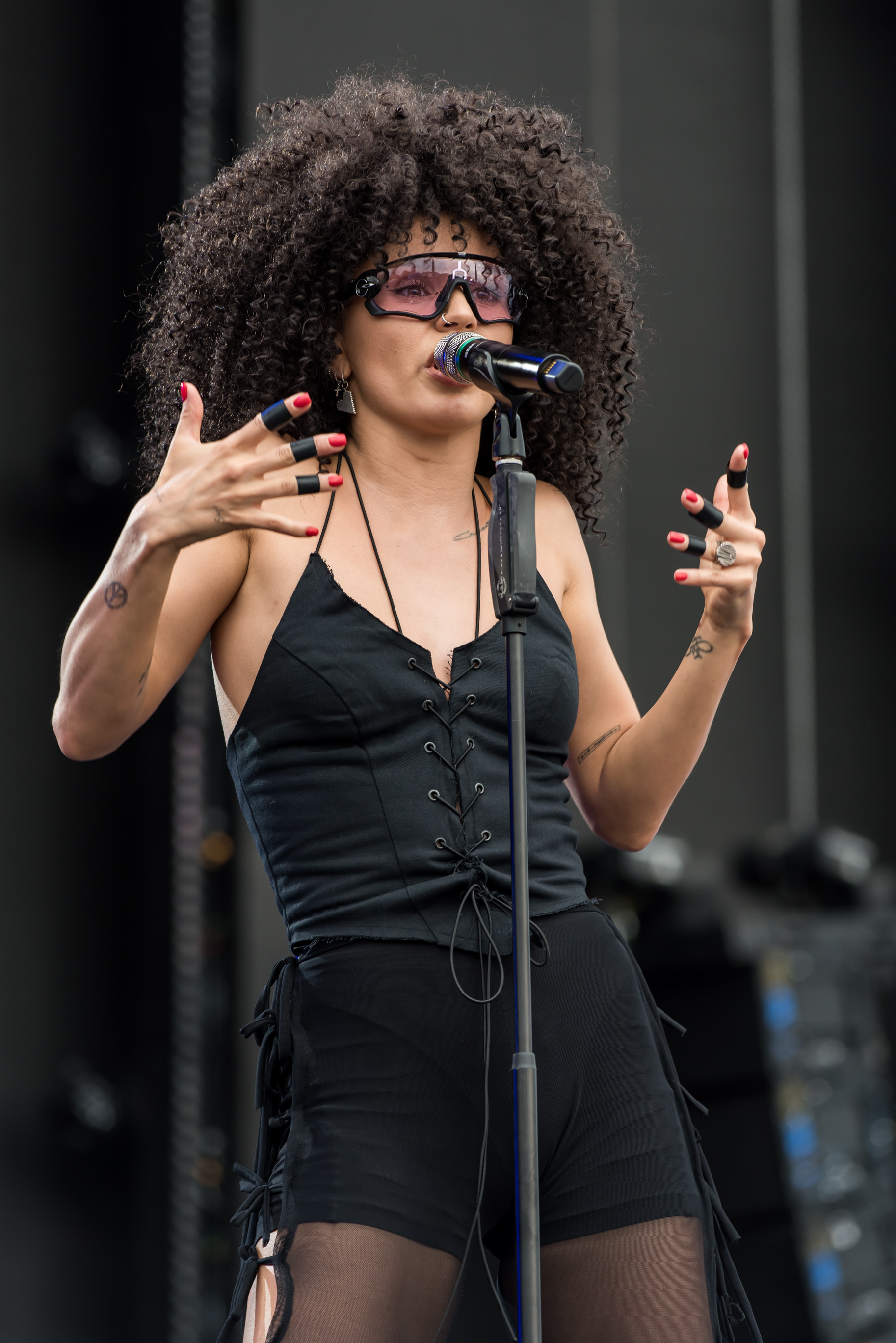
Zivert

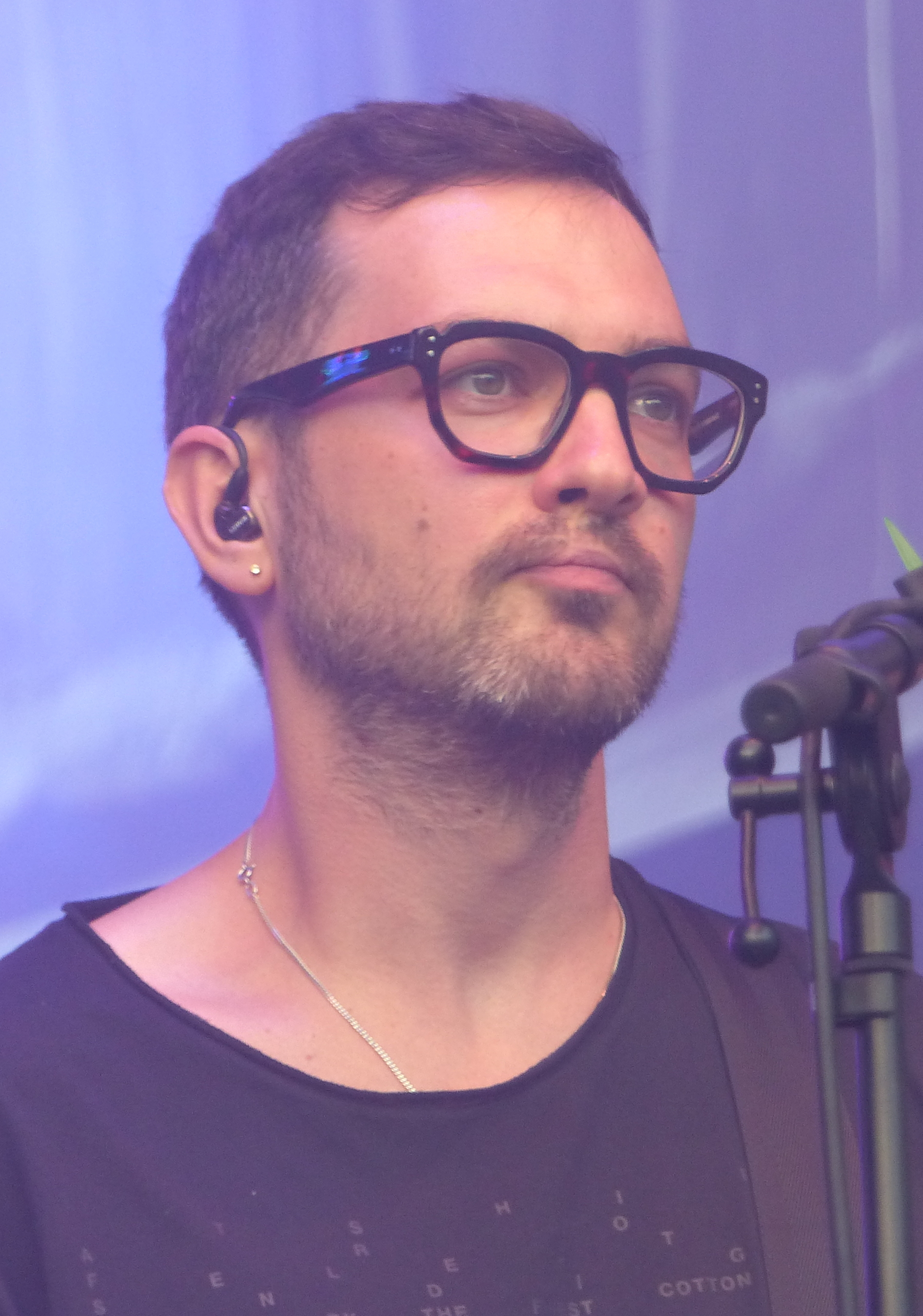
Anton Belyaev

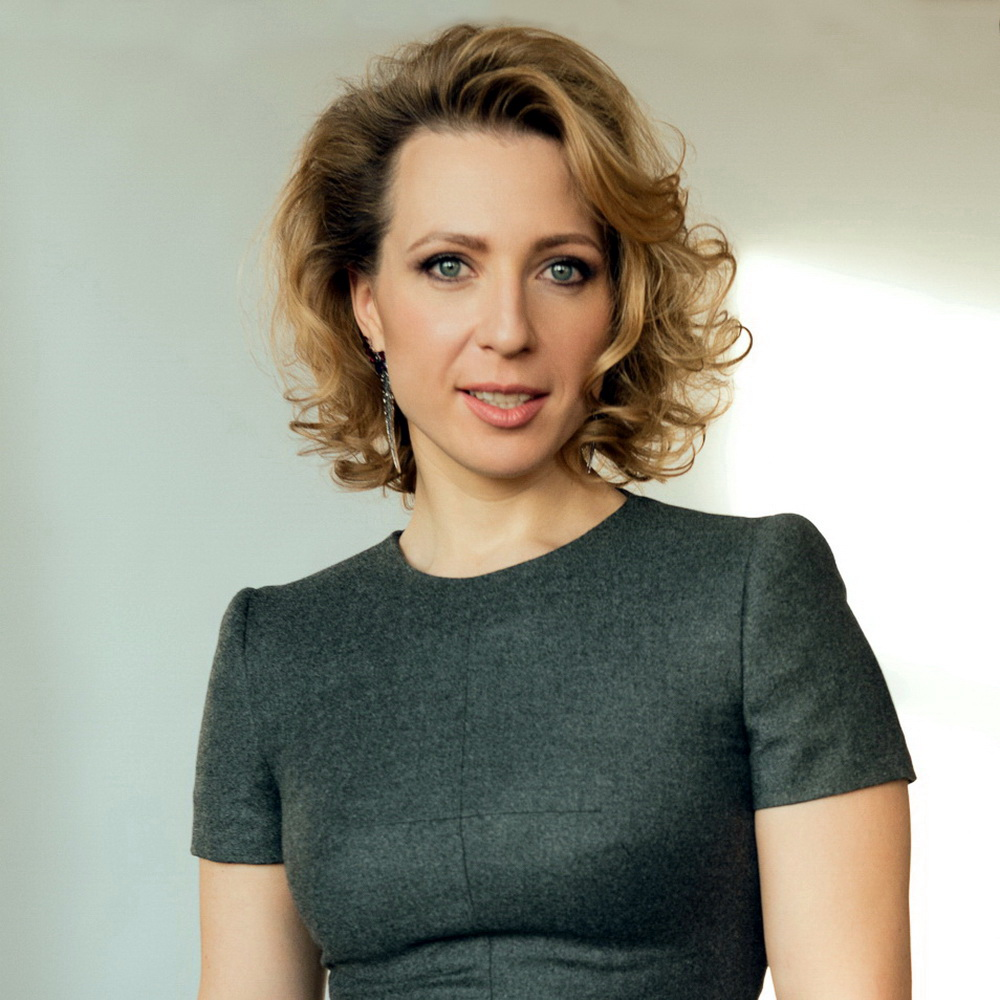
Yana Churikova

== Teams ==
Colour key

- Winner
- Runner-up
- Third place
- Fourth place
- Eliminated in the Semi-final
- Eliminated in the Quarterfinal
- Stolen in the Knockout rounds
- Eliminated in the Knockout rounds
- Eliminated in the Battle rounds

Coach	Top 48 Artists				
Vladimir Presnyakov					
Vladimir Presnyakov	Georgy Russkikh	Darya Zvezdina	Anastasia Martynova	~~Alexander Novikov~~	Arsen Dzhalavyan
Vladimir Presnyakov	Mariana Chukova	Vita Makurina	Irina Zorina	Anastasia Panshina	Gor Gabrielyan
Vladimir Presnyakov	Veronika Novikova	Stanislav Akulov & Marianna Russu	Ilya Bulygin		
Polina Gagarina					
Polina Gagarina	Bogdan Shuvalov	Evgeny Kurchich	Alina Kalashnikova	~~Darya Zvezdina~~	Diana Makarova
Polina Gagarina	Inna Evtushenko	Sofia Lloret	Ksenia Murashova	Elza Yusupova	Alexander Vlasenkov
Polina Gagarina	Fakhriddin Khakimov	Dana Sokolova	Roman Trifonov		
Zivert					
Zivert	Alexey Sulima	Polina Chusovitina	Anatoly Kolmagorov	~~Alina Kalashnikova~~	Madzh Akrut
Zivert	Karina Kagermazova	Kelvin Oveto	Anatoly Kormanovsky	Anastasia Buchkovskaya	Murad Ibragimov
Zivert	Samir Vishnyakov	Eva Avakyan	Pyotr Rodionov		
Anton Belyaev					
Anton Belyaev	Anastasia Sadkovskaya	Beka Shoshiashvili	Alexander Novikov	~~Anatoly Kolmagorov~~	Emma Dergilev
Anton Belyaev	Marina Yakovleva	Anna Ivanova	Elizaveta Denisova	Oleg Prokuratov	Pavel Murashov
Anton Belyaev	Daniil Bespalov	Violetta Tkachenko	Yunisel Gonsales		
Note: italicized names are artists stolen from another team during the battles or the knockouts (names struck through within former teams).

== The Blind Auditions ==
The show begins with the blind auditions. In each audition, an artist sings their piece in front of the coaches, whose chairs are facing the audience. If a coach is interested in working with the artist, they may press their button to face the artist. If only one coach presses the button, the artist automatically becomes part of their team. If multiple coaches turn, they will compete for the artist, who will decide which team they will join. As from season seven, each coach must have to complete its team with twelve artists. Each coach has granted four "blocks" instead of three from previous season to prevent another coach from getting an artist, with two coaches can be blocked in single audition. At the end of the blind auditions, Zivert didn’t use her fourth block.

The feature "Best Coach" is applied again this season.

✔	Coach pressed "I WANT YOU" button
✔	Coach pressed "I WANT YOU" button, even its team has already full
	Artist joined this coach's team
	Artist defaulted to a coach's team
	Artist was eliminated with no coach pressing their button
✘	Coach pressed "I WANT YOU" button, but was blocked by another coach from getting the artist
	Blocked by Vladimir Presnyakov; Blocked by Polina Gagarina; Blocked by Zivert; Blocked by Anton Belyaev

During the opening of the episode, the coaches performed "Fantasy" by Earth, Wind and Fire

Episode	Order	Artist	Age	Origin	Song	Coach's and artist's choices			
Episode	Order	Artist	Age	Origin	Song	Presnyakov	Gagarina	Zivert	Belyaev
Episode 1 (Note: Vladimir Presnyakov is The best coach of episode 1.) (January 19)	1	Anastasia Sadkovskaya	21	Kalinkavichy, Belarus	«Этот поцелуй»	✔	✘	✘	✔
Episode 1 (January 19)	2	Alexey Sulima	33	Barnaul	«Сам тебя выдумал»	—	✔	✔	✔
Episode 1 (January 19)	3	Anastasia Martynova	29	Saint Petersburg	«Set Fire to the Rain»	✔	✔	✘	✘
Episode 1 (January 19)	4	Arsen Dzhalavyan	34	Pyatigorsk	«Я – то, что надо»	✔	—	—	—
Episode 1 (January 19)	5	Irina Zorina	38	Perm	«Stop!»	✔	✘	—	—
Episode 1 (January 19)	6	Alexander Kruze	32	Tula	«Очарована»	—	—	—	—
Episode 1 (January 19)	7	Elza Yusupova	22	Biektaw, Tatarstan	«Con te partirò»	—	✔	—	—
Episode 1 (January 19)	8	Alexander Shabotinsky	35	Ivanovo	«В самое сердце»	—	—	—	—
Episode 1 (January 19)	9	Anastasia Panshina	29	Novopskov, Ukraine	«Спектакль окончен»	✔	✔	—	—
Episode 2 (Note: Vladimir Presnyakov is The best coach of episode 2.) (January 26)	1	Ilya Bulygin	25	Voronezh	«Не плачь»	✔	✔	✔	—
Episode 2 (January 26)	2	Darya Zvezdina	24	Krasnoyarsk	«Ласточка»	—	✔	—	✔
Episode 2 (January 26)	3	Oleg Prokuratov	39	Lyubertsy, Moscow Oblast	«The Best»	✘	—	—	✔
Episode 2 (January 26)	4	Anna Trubetskaya	24	Mogilev, Belarus	«Я тебе не верю»	—	—	—	—
Episode 2 (January 26)	5	Bogdan Shuvalov	26	Saint Petersburg	«Lovely»	✔	✔	✘	✔
Episode 2 (January 26)	6	Nataliya Kalyuzhnaya	27	Krasnye Barrikady, Astrakhan Oblast	«Потерянный рай»	—	—	—	—
Episode 2 (January 26)	7	Ivan Dyatlov	24	Vichuga, Ivanovo Oblast	«Livin’ la Vida Loca»	—	—	—	—
Episode 2 (January 26)	8	Veronika Novikova	27	Kolomna, Moscow Oblast	«Никак»	✔	✘	✔	✘
Episode 2 (January 26)	9	Pyotr Rodionov	37	Saint Petersburg	«Шанхай-блюз»	—	—	✔	—
Episode 2 (January 26)	10	Violetta Tkachenko	20	Rostov-on-Don	«Hotel California»	—	—	—	✔
Episode 3 (Note: Vladimir Presnyakov is The best coach of episode 3.) (February 2)	1	Elizaveta Denisova	25	Tula	«Nothing Compares 2 U»	✔	✔	✔	✔
Episode 3 (February 2)	2	Georgy Russkikh	20	Novozavidovsky, Tver Oblast	«Вечно молодой»	✔	✔	―	―
Episode 3 (February 2)	3	Mariya Chekunova	20	Moscow	«Белая вишня»	—	—	—	—
Episode 3 (February 2)	4	Sergey Shnurov	50	Saint Petersburg	«Теримнатор»	✔	✔	✔	✔
Episode 3 (February 2)	5	Marya Bulygina	18	Moscow	«Одиночка»	—	—	—	—
Episode 3 (February 2)	6	Madzh Akrut	23	Tunis, Tunisia	«Desert Rose»	✔	✔	✔	✔
Episode 3 (February 2)	7	Diana Makarova	20	Simferopol, Ukraine	«Озеро надежды»	—	✔	—	—
Episode 3 (February 2)	8	Beka Shoshiashvili	33	Tbilisi, Georgia	«Люби меня, люби»	✔	✔	—	✔
Episode 3 (February 2)	9	Vera Egorova	36	Tallinn, Estonia	«Mon mec à moi»	—	—	—	—
Episode 3 (February 2)	10	Inna Evtushenko	34	Balkhash, Kazakhstan	«Круги на воде»	—	✔	—	—
Episode 4 (Note: Vladimir Presnyakov is The best coach of episode 4.) (February 9)	1	Daniil Bespalov	22	Tolyatti, Samara Oblast	«Когда молод был»	✔	✔	—	✔
Episode 4 (February 9)	2	Anastasia Buchkovskaya	27	Saint Petersburg	«A Song for You»	✔	✔	✔	✘
Episode 4 (February 9)	3	Fakhriddin Khakimov	32	Istaravshan, Tajikistan	«Беловежская пуща»	—	✔	—	✔
Episode 4 (February 9)	4	Polina Chirikova	22	Ekaterinburg	«31-я весна»	—	—	—	—
Episode 4 (February 9)	5	Yunisel Gonsales	38	Havana, Cuba	«Volare»	—	✔	—	✔
Episode 4 (February 9)	6	Anna Kravchenko	27	Volgograd	«Life»	—	—	—	—
Episode 4 (February 9)	7	Anatoly Kolmogorov	25	Saransk	«На белом покрывале января»	✔	—	✔	✔
Episode 4 (February 9)	8	Stanislav Akulov & Marianna Russu	49/33	Tambov/Noyabrsk, YaNAO	«Stumblin’ In»	✔	—	—	—
Episode 4 (February 9)	9	Maya Safulina	29	Kazan	«К единственному, нежному...»	—	—	—	—
Episode 4 (February 9)	10	Dana Sokolova	27	Riga, Latvia	«Индиго»	—	✔	—	—
Episode 5 (Note: Polina Gagarina is The best coach of episode 5.) (February 16)	1	Polina Chusovitina	27	Ekaterinburg	«Пропадаю я»	✔	✔	✔	—
Episode 5 (February 16)	2	Evgeny Kurchich	33	Slutsk, Belarus	«Ты не целуй»	—	✔	—	—
Episode 5 (February 16)	3	Polina Parfyonova	22	Volgograd	«Бросай»	—	—	—	—
Episode 5 (February 16)	4	Emma Dergileva	20	Chișinău, Moldova	«idontwannabeyouanymore»	✔	—	—	✔
Episode 5 (February 16)	5	Georgy Lutsenko	35	Mariupol, Ukraine	«Казанова»	—	—	—	—
Episode 5 (February 16)	6	Maria Korel	35	Arkhangelsk	«That Man»	—	—	—	—
Episode 5 (February 16)	7	Samir Vishnyakov	33	Petrozavodsk	«Песня на бис»	—	✔	✔	—
Episode 5 (February 16)	8	Karina Kagermazova	18	Nalchik	«Шёлковое сердце»	—	—	✔	—
Episode 5 (February 16)	9	Pavel Murashov	41	Moscow	«Sacrifice»	—	✔	✔	✔
Episode 5 (February 16)	10	Ksenia Murashova	31	Chelyabinsk	«Shallow»	✔	✔	✘	✔
Episode 6 (Note: Polina Gagarina is The best coach of episode 6.) (March, 1)	1	Roman Trifonov	19	Atkarsk, Saratov Oblast	«Есть только миг»	—	✔	—	—
Episode 6 (March, 1)	2	Zlata Malikova	18	Novomoskovsk, Tula Oblast	«Пташечка»	—	—	—	—
Episode 6 (March, 1)	3	Alexander Novikov	35	Sergiev Posad, Moscow Oblast	«Мама»	✔	✔	✔	—
Episode 6 (March, 1)	4	Vita Makurina	33	Khabarovsk	«Колыбельная»	✔	—	—	—
Episode 6 (March, 1)	5	Anatoly Kormanovsky	35	Bratsk, Irkutsk Oblast	"Too Close"	✘	✔	✔	✘
Episode 6 (March, 1)	6	Instasamka	23	Moscow	«За деньги да»	✔	✔	✔	—
Episode 6 (March, 1)	7	Kelvin Oveto	33	Warri, Nigeria	«I Want It That Way»	—	—	✔	—
Episode 6 (March, 1)	8	Eva Avakyan	18	Reutov, Moscow Oblast	«Golden Slumbers»	—	✔	✔	—
Episode 6 (March, 1)	9	Nikolay Orlov	33	Moscow	«Улица роз»	—	—	—	—
Episode 6 (March, 1)	10	Anna Ivanova	19	Moscow	«Deedles blues»	✔	✔	✔	✔
Episode 7 (Note: Vladimir Presnyakov and Polina Gagarina are The best coach of episode 7.) (March, 9)	1	Evgeny Lepikhin	43	Moscow	«Mambo Italiano»	—	—	—	—
Episode 7 (March, 9)	2	Sofia Lloret	17	Moscow	«You Lost Me»	✔	✔	✘	✔
Episode 7 (March, 9)	3	Murad Ibragimov	21	Pyatigorsk, Stavropol Krai	«Солдат любви»	—	—	✔	—
Episode 7 (March, 9)	4	Karina Gaziyants	32	Tashkent, Uzbekistan	«Беспощадная правда»	—	—	—	—
Episode 7 (March, 9)	5	Alexander Vlasenkov	29	Tula	«Таня, Танюша»	—	✔	—	—
Episode 7 (March, 9)	6	Maria Chukova	28	Dovzhansk, Ukraine	«Easy on Me»	✔	Team full	✘	—
Episode 7 (March, 9)	7	Elizabeth Dolzhenkova	18	Blagoveshchensk	«Ах, мамочка»	—	Team full	—	—
Episode 7 (March, 9)	8	Gor Gabrielyan	21	Novorossiysk, Krasnodar Krai	«Капкан»	✔	Team full	—	—
Episode 7 (March, 9)	9	Marina Yakovleva	30	Surgut, Khanty-Mansi Autonomous Okrug	«Город влюблённых»	✔	✔	—	✔
Episode 7 (March, 9)	10	Dmitry Loshkarev	27	Gubkin, Belgorod Oblast	«No Roots»	Team full	Team full	—	Team full
Episode 7 (March, 9)	11	Yulia Baibikova	28	Saratov	«Жди меня»	Team full	Team full	—	Team full
Episode 7 (March, 9)	12	Alina Kalashnikova	20	Izobilny, Stavropol Krai	«Lovefool»	✔	✔	✔	✔

== The Battles ==
The Battle Rounds aired from March 15 to March 22, 2024. Contestants who win their battle would advance to the Knockout rounds. No steals were allowed in this round.

Colour key

Artist won the Battle and advanced to the Knockouts
Artist lost the Battle and was eliminated

Episode	Coach	Order	Winner	Song	Loser
Episode 8 (March, 15) (Note: Polina Gagarina a is The best coach of episode 8.)	Vladimir Presnyakov	1	Alexander Novikov	«Кустурица»	Ilya Bulygin
Episode 8 (March, 15)	Anton Belyaev	2	Anatoly Kolmogorov	«Fragile»	Yunisel Gonsales
Episode 8 (March, 15)	Zivert	3	Alina Kalashnikova	«Ночь» / «Стрелы»	Pyotr Rodionov
Episode 8 (March, 15)	Polina Gagarina	4	Darya Zdezdina	«Туда»	Roman Trifonov
Episode 8 (March, 15)	Vladimir Presnyakov	5	Arsen Dzhalavyan	«Hot Stuff»	Stanislav Akulov & Marianna Russu
Episode 8 (March, 15)	Anton Belyaev	6	Anna Ivanova	«Поговори со мною, мама»	Violetta Tkachenko
Episode 8 (March, 15)	Zivert	7	Madzh Akrut	«7 Seconds»	Eva Avakyan
Episode 8 (March, 15)	Polina Gagarina	8	Inna Evtushenko	«Роза чайная» / «It's Raining Men»	Dana Sokolova
Episode 8 (March, 15)	Vladimir Presnyakov	9	Georgy Russkikh	«Бросай»	Veronika Novikova
Episode 8 (March, 15)	Anton Belyaev	10	Marina Yakovleva	«Дорога»	Daniil Bespalov
Episode 8 (March, 15)	Polina Gagarina	11	Sofia Lloret	«You Raise Me Up»	Fakhriddin Khakimov
Episode 8 (March, 15)	Zivert	12	Alexey Sulima	«Проститься»	Samir Vishnyakov
Episode 9 (March, 22) (Note: Polina Gagarina is The best coach of episode 9.)	Polina Gagarina	1	Evgeny Kurchich	«Ах, ты, степь широкая»	Alexander Vlasenkov
Episode 9 (March, 22)	Zivert	2	Polina Chusovitina	«Лебединая»	Murad Ibragimov
Episode 9 (March, 22)	Anton Belyaev	3	Anastasia Sadkovskaya	«More Than Words»	Pavel Murashov
Episode 9 (March, 22)	Vladimir Presnyakov	4	Vita Makurina	«Отпусти»	Gor Gabrielyan
Episode 9 (March, 22)	Polina Gagarina	5	Bogdan Shuvalov	«A Whole New World»	Elza Yusupova
Episode 9 (March, 22)	Anton Belyaev	6	Beka Shoshiashvili	«Самолёт»	Oleg Prokuratov
Episode 9 (March, 22)	Polina Gagarina	7	Diana Makarova	«Новый герой»	Ksenia Murashova
Episode 9 (March, 22)	Zivert	8	Kelvin Oveto	«Insatiable»	Anastasia Buchkovskaya
Episode 9 (March, 22)	Vladimir Presnyakov	9	Mariana Chukova	«День опять погас»	Anastasia Panshina
Episode 9 (March, 22)	Zivert	10	Karina Kagermazova	«Don't Speak»	Anatoly Kormanovsky
Episode 9 (March, 22)	Anton Belyaev	11	Emma Dergileva	«Опять метель»	Elizaveta Denisova
Episode 9 (March, 22)	Vladimir Presnyakov	12	Anastasia Martynova	«Toxic»	Irina Zorina

== The Knockouts ==
The Knockout Rounds aired from March 29 to April 5, 2024. Similar to the previous two seasons, each coach pairs three artists into one knockout with only one contestant from the trio advances to the next round and also can steal one losing artist from another coach. The top 12 contestants moved on to the Quarterfinal.

Colour key

Artist won the Knockout and advanced to the Quarterfinal
Artist lost the Knockout but was stolen by another coach and advanced to the Quarterfinal
Artist lost the Knockout and was eliminated

Episode	Coach	Order	Song	Artists		Song	'Steal' result			
Episode	Coach	Order	Song	Winner	Losers	Song	Presnyakov	Gagarina	Zivert	Belyaev
Episode 10 (March, 29) (Note: Polina Gagarina is The best coach of episode 10.)	Anton Belyaev	1	«Мимоходом»	Anastasia Sadkovskaya	Anatoly Kolmagorov	«Песня о далёкой родине»	—	✔	✔	—N/a
Episode 10 (March, 29)	Anton Belyaev	1	«Мимоходом»	Anastasia Sadkovskaya	Anna Ivanova	«As»	—	—	Team full	—N/a
Episode 10 (March, 29)	Zivert	2	«Улетаю»	Polina Chusovitina	Karina Kagermazova	«Зелёные волны»	—	—	Team full	—
Episode 10 (March, 29)	Zivert	2	«Улетаю»	Polina Chusovitina	Kelvin Oveto	«Maria Maria»	—	—	Team full	—
Episode 10 (March, 29)	Polina Gagarina	3	«Я здесь»	Evgeny Kurchich	Darya Zdezdina	«Пёрышко»	✔	—N/a	Team full	—
Episode 10 (March, 29)	Polina Gagarina	3	«Я здесь»	Evgeny Kurchich	Sofia Lloret	«Bang Bang»	Team full	—N/a	Team full	—
Episode 10 (March, 29)	Vladimir Presnyakov	4	«Романс»	Georgy Russkikh	Mariana Chukova	«Flowers»	Team full	—	Team full	—
Episode 10 (March, 29)	Vladimir Presnyakov	4	«Романс»	Georgy Russkikh	Vita Makurina	«Bring Me to Life»	Team full	—	Team full	—
Episode 11 (April, 5) (Note: Polina Gagarina a is The best coach of episode 11.)	Vladimir Presnyakov	1	«Отпускаю»	Anastasia Martynova	Alexander Novikov	«Небо на ладони»	Team full	—	Team full	✔
Episode 11 (April, 5)	Vladimir Presnyakov	1	«Отпускаю»	Anastasia Martynova	Arsen Dzhalavyan	«Розовый фламинго»	Team full	—	Team full	Team full
Episode 11 (April, 5)	Polina Gagarina	2	«It’s Now Or Never» / «Tutti Frutti»	Bogdan Shuvalov	Inna Evtushenko	«Ариозо Иоланты»	Team full	—N/a	Team full	Team full
Episode 11 (April, 5)	Polina Gagarina	2	«It’s Now Or Never» / «Tutti Frutti»	Bogdan Shuvalov	Diana Makarova	«Останусь»	Team full	—N/a	Team full	Team full
Episode 11 (April, 5)	Anton Belyaev	3	«Что происходит?»	Beka Shoshiashvili	Marina Yakovleva	«Maria»	Team full	—	Team full	Team full
Episode 11 (April, 5)	Anton Belyaev	3	«Что происходит?»	Beka Shoshiashvili	Emma Dergilyova	«Старый отель»	Team full	—	Team full	Team full
Episode 11 (April, 5)	Zivert	4	«Чистые пруды»	Alexey Sulima	Alina Kalashnikova	«Он тебя целует»	Team full	✔	Team full	Team full
Episode 11 (April, 5)	Zivert	4	«Чистые пруды»	Alexey Sulima	Mazhd Akrut	«Part Time Lover»	Team full	Team full	Team full	Team full

== Live shows ==
Colour key:

Artist was saved
Artist was eliminated

=== Week 1: Top 12 — Quarterfinal (April 12) ===
The Live Top 12 Quarterfinal comprised episode 12. The top twelve artists performed, with two artists from each team advancing based on the sum of the viewers' and coach's votes.

Episode	Coach	Order	Artist	Song	Coach's vote (/100%)	Public's vote (/100%)	Votes' sum	Result
Episode 12 (April 12) (Note: Polina Gagarina a is The best coach of episode 12.)	Polina Gagarina	1	Bogdan Shuvalov	«Полетели»	50%	48,6%	98,6%	Advanced
Episode 12 (April 12)	Polina Gagarina	2	Alina Kalashnikova	«Больно»	20%	25,2%	45,2%	Eliminated
Episode 12 (April 12)	Polina Gagarina	3	Evgeny Kurchich	«Поздно»	30%	26,2%	56,2%	Advanced
Episode 12 (April 12)	Zivert	4	Anatoly Kolmagorov	«Señorita»	20%	14,2%	34,2%	Eliminated
Episode 12 (April 12)	Zivert	5	Polina Chusovitina	«Всё в твоих руках»	30%	17,5%	47,5%	Advanced
Episode 12 (April 12)	Zivert	6	Alexey Sulima	«Любовь, похожая на сон»	50%	68,3%	118,3%	Advanced
Episode 12 (April 12)	Anton Belyaev	7	Beka Shoshiashvili	«'O sole mio»	50%	22,1%	72,1%	Advanced
Episode 12 (April 12)	Anton Belyaev	8	Alexander Novikov	«Я буду помнить»	20%	31,1%	51,1%	Eliminated
Episode 12 (April 12)	Anton Belyaev	9	Anastasia Sadkovskaya	«Natural Blues»	30%	46,8%	76,8%	Advanced
Episode 12 (April 12)	Vladimir Presnyakov	10	Anastasia Martynova	«Звёзды»	20%	15,5%	34,5%	Eliminated
Episode 12 (April 12)	Vladimir Presnyakov	11	Georgy Russkikh	«Замок из дождя»	50%	34,5%	84,5%	Advanced
Episode 12 (April 12)	Vladimir Presnyakov	12	Darya Zvezdina	«Я твоя»	30%	50%	80%	Advanced

=== Week 2: Top 8 — Semifinal (April 19) ===
The top eight artists performed on April 19, 2024, with one artist from each team advancing to the Final based on the sum of the viewers' and coach's votes

Episode	Coach	Order	Artist	Song	Coach's vote (/100%)	Public's vote (/100%)	Votes' sum	Result
Episode 13 (April 19) (Note: Polina Gagarina a is The best coach of episode 13.)	Polina Gagarina	1	Evgeny Kurchich	«The Show Must Go On»	40%	26,5%	66,5%	Eliminated
Episode 13 (April 19)	Polina Gagarina	2	Bogdan Shuvalov	«Грешная страсть»	60%	73,5%	133,5%	Advanced
Episode 13 (April 19)	Anton Belyaev	3	Beka Shoshiashvili	«Overjoyed»	40%	29,6%	69,6%	Eliminated
Episode 13 (April 19)	Anton Belyaev	4	Anastasia Sadkovskaya	«Острова»	60%	70,4%	130,4%	Advanced
Episode 13 (April 19)	Vladimir Presnyakov	5	Darya Zvezdina	«Нечего терять»	40%	43,1%	83,1%	Eliminated
Episode 13 (April 19)	Vladimir Presnyakov	6	Georgy Russkikh	«Я привык бродить один»	60%	56,9%	116,9%	Advanced
Episode 13 (April 19)	Zivert	7	Alexey Sulima	«Тут и там»	60%	68,5%	128,5%	Advanced
Episode 13 (April 19)	Zivert	8	Polina Chusovitina	«Я просто люблю тебя»	40%	31,5%	71,5%	Eliminated

Trios
Order	Performer	Song
13.1	Nikolay Rastorguev, Evgeny Kurchich and Bogdan Shuvakov	"Конь"
13.2	Eva Polna, Beka Shoshiashvili and Anastasia Sadkovskaya	"Лучшее в тебе"
13.3	Basta, Darya Zvezdina and Georgy Russkikh	«На заре»
13.4	Lyubov Uspenskaya, Alexey Sulima and Polina Chusovitina	«Ещё минута»

=== Week 3: Final (April 27) ===
As like the previous seasons, the winner will be determined through public votes alone. The artist with the highest percentage of votes was declared as the winner.

Bogdan Shuvalov was announced the winner, marking Polina Gagarina's third win as a coach. Polina Gagarina became the second coach in the history of the Russian Voice to win three seasons.

Episode	Coach	Artist	Order	Duet Song (with Coach)	Order	Solo Song (no.1)	Order	Solo Song (no.2)	Result	
Episode 14 (April 27)
Episode 14 (April 27)	Vladimir Presnyakov	Georgy Russkikh	1	«Аэропорты»	5	«Группа крови»	9	«Моя любовь»	33,1%	Runner-up
Episode 14 (April 27)	Polina Gagarina	Bogdan Shuvalov	2	«A Million Voices»	6	«Adagio»	10	«Единственная моя»	35,4%	Winner
Episode 14 (April 27)	Anton Belyaev	Anastasia Sadkovskaya	3	«Robots»	7	«О нём»	Eliminated		Fourth place	
Episode 14 (April 27)	Zivert	Alexey Sulima	4	«неболей»	8	«На меньшее я не согласен»	11	«Я люблю тебя до слёз»	31,5%	Third place

Performer	Song
Anastasia Sadkovskaya	«Не плачь»
Bogdan Shuvalov (winner)	«It’s Now or Never» / «Tutti Frutti»

== Best Coach ==
- Best Coach
- Second place
- Third place
- Fourth place
- Episode's Best Coach

Coach	Public's vote _{(per episode)}														Result
Coach	#1	#2	#3	#4	#5	#6	#7	#8	#9	#10	#11	#12	#13	Av.	Result
Polina Gagarina	30%	30%	30%	26%	34%	35%	34%	35%	38%	33%	35%	32%	33%	32%	Best coach
Vladimir Presnyakov	32%	38%	37%	33%	25%	31%	34%	26%	25%	23%	27%	24%	30%	31%	Second place
Anton Belyaev	25%	21%	22%	30%	25%	21%	20%	23%	21%	23%	23%	22%	22%	23%	Third place
Zivert	13%	11%	11%	11%	16%	13%	12%	16%	16%	21%	15%	22%	15%	14%	Fourth place
