= The Voice (Russian TV series) season 13 =

The Voice
- Season 13
- Presented by: Yana Churikova
- Coaches: Basta; Polina Gagarina; Hibla Gerzmava; Anton Belyaev
- Winner: David Sanikidze
- Winning coach: Hibla Gerzmava
- Runner-up: Dzambolat Dulaev

Release
- Original network: Channel One
- Original release: 31 January – 25 April 2025

Season chronology
- ← Previous; Season 12 Next → Season 14

The thirteenth season of the Russian reality talent show The Voice premiered on January 31, 2025, on Channel One which is the third time that the show is not released in Fall season. The coaching panel consists of Polina Gagarina and Anton Belyaev, who both returned from the previous season for their seventh and third seasons as coaches. Former coach Basta returned for his fifth season, replacing Vladimir Presnyakov. Debuting coach Hibla Gerzmava replaced Zivert. Yana Churikova returned as host of the program for her third season.

David Sanikidze was announced as the winner of the season, marking Hibla Gerzmava's first win as a coach. With Sanikidze's win, Hibla Gerzmava became the third coach, after Grigory Leps and Konstantin Meladze to win on their debut season. However, Gerzmava was the first female coach to accomplish this. Additionally, both the winner (Sanikidze) and runner-up (Dulaev) were originally from Gerzmava's team following the blind auditions before Anton Belyaev stole Dulaev in the knockouts.

== Coaches and host ==
Basta, Polina Gagarina, and Anton Belyaev all returned for their fifth, seventh, and third seasons, respectively. Debutant Hibla Gerzmava joined the panel, marking the second season in the show's history where two female coaches were present on the panel.

Yana Churikova continued as the presenter of the show.

The Voice season 13 coaches and presenter

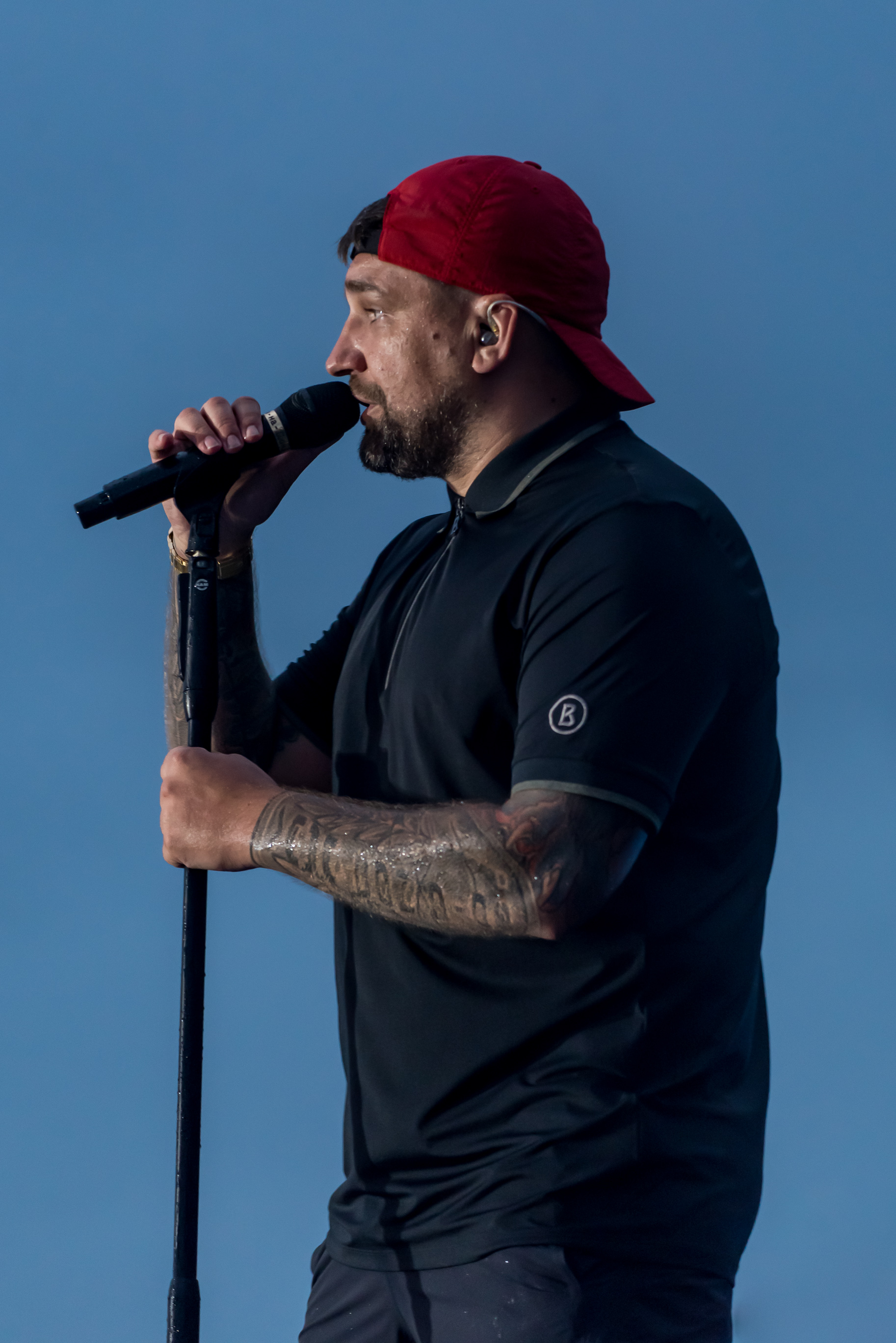
Basta

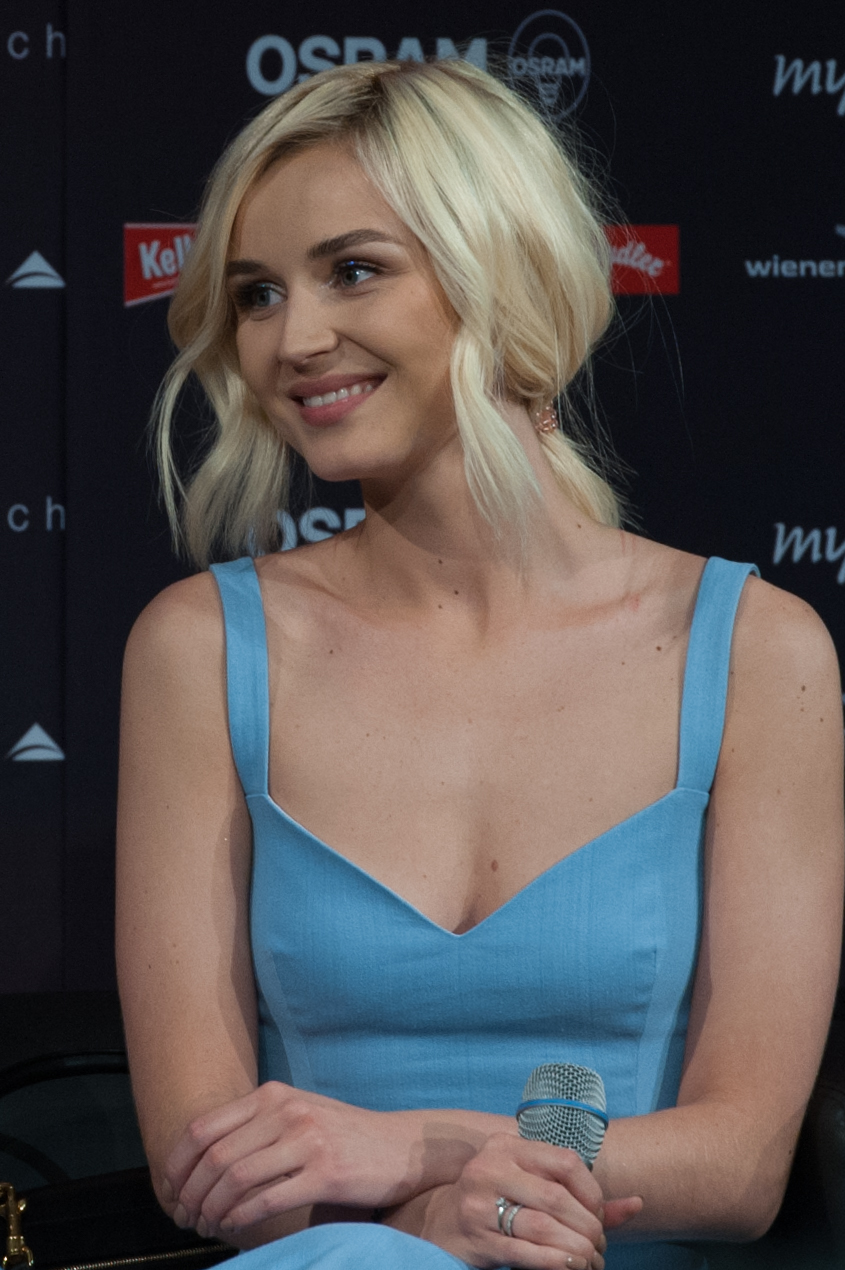
Polina Gagarina

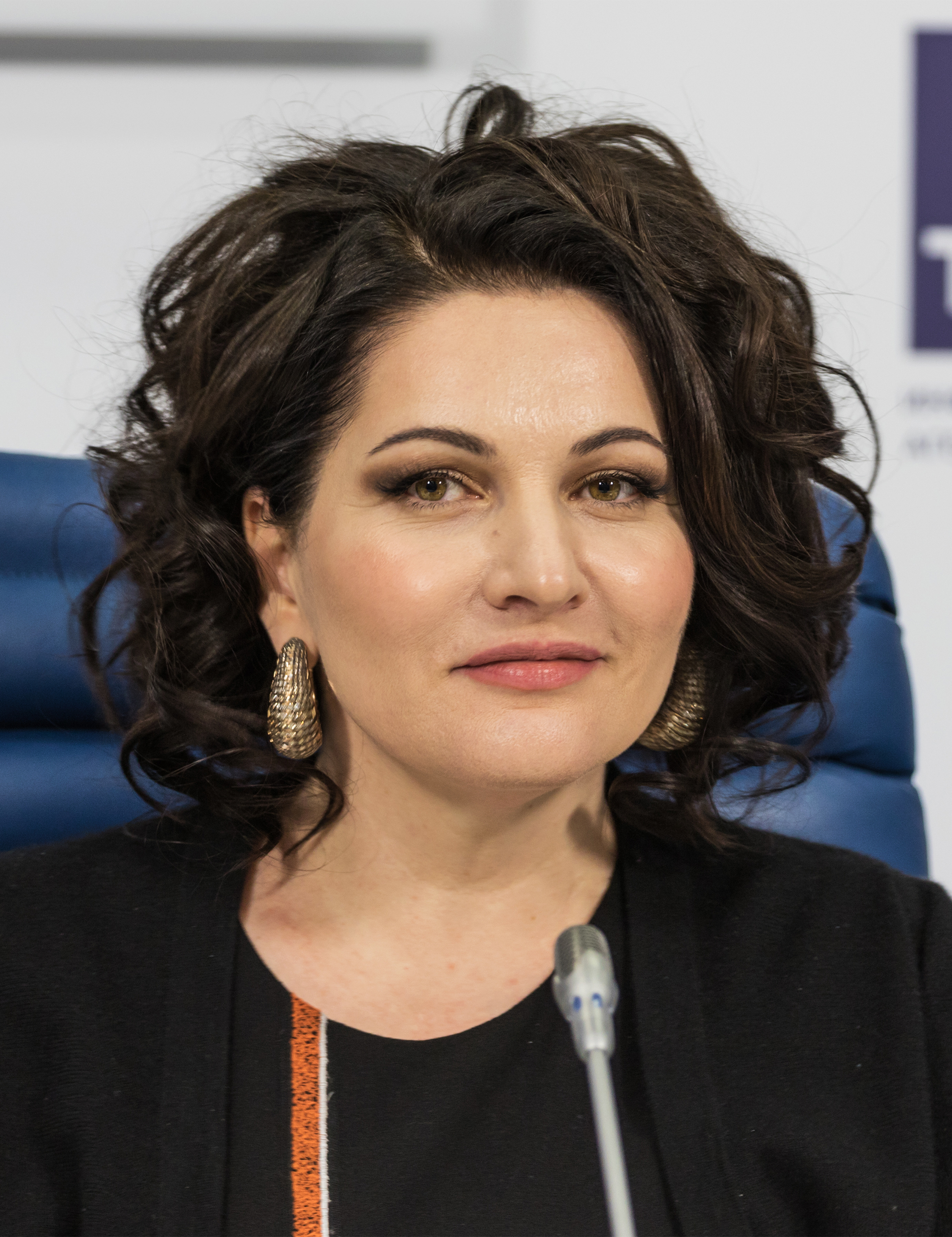
Hibla Gerzmava

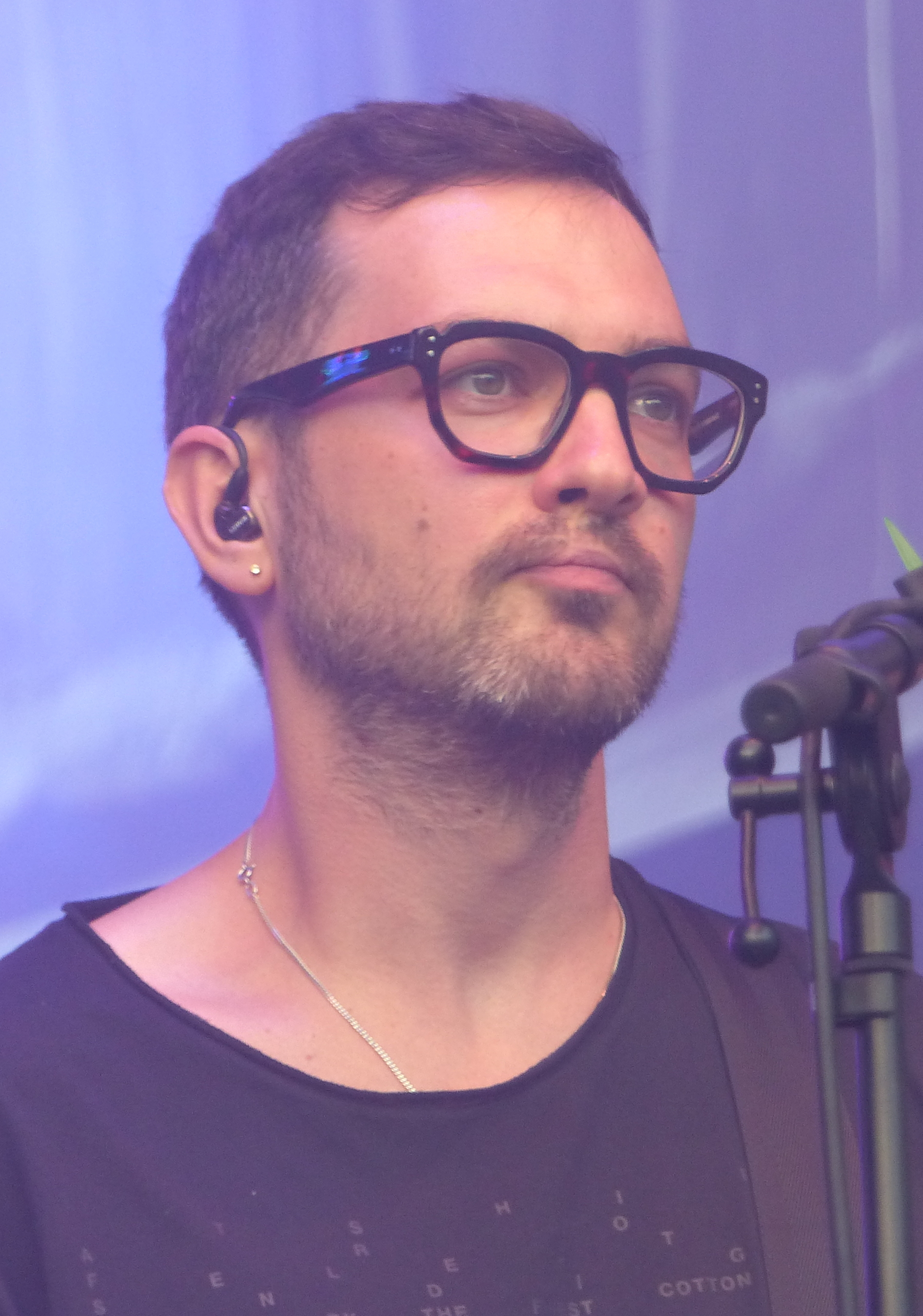
Anton Belyaev

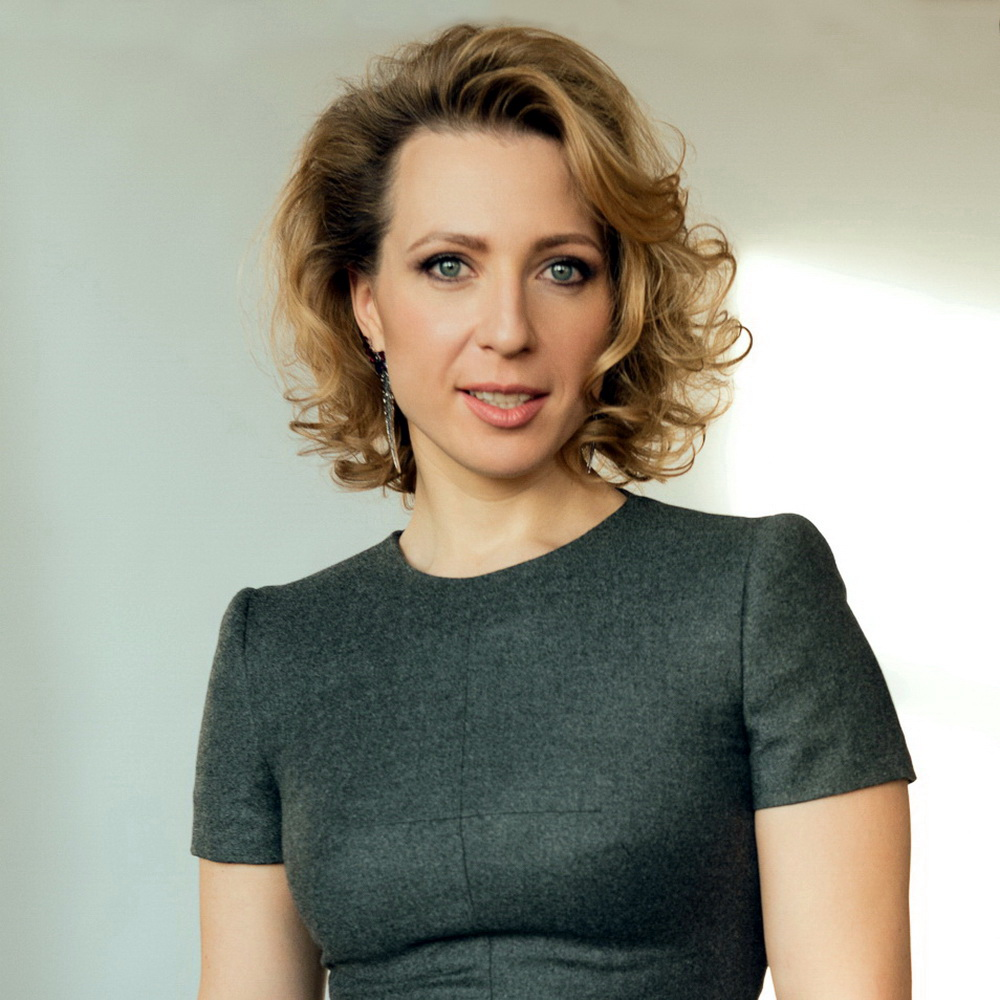
Yana Churikova

== Teams ==
Colour key

- Winner
- Runner-up
- Third place
- Fourth place
- Eliminated in the Final
- Eliminated in the Semi-final
- Stolen in the Knockout rounds
- Eliminated in the Knockout rounds
- Eliminated in the Battle rounds

Coach	Top 48 Artists				
Basta					
Basta	Ilya Altukhov	Valery Rogulin	Liana Zainullina	~~Ksenia Chagunava~~	~~Natalya Sergienko~~
Basta	Eleonora Detkova	Anna Perevozkina	Mila Novak	Aymen Gabish	Alexandra Chernousova
Basta	Veronika Meleksetyan	Daria Kotova	Ilona Triandafillidi		
Polina Gagarina					
Polina Gagarina	Valentina Yanshina	Natalya Sergienko	Valeria Asonova	Victor Chesnokov	Yulia Uchaykina
Polina Gagarina	Olga Kozlova	Alon Nizamov	Yuri Kurnakov	Dmitry Klychkov	Mikhail Demidov
Polina Gagarina	Vladimir Grinchenko	Ulyana Zarva	Ignat Izotov		
Hibla Gerzmava					
Hibla Gerzmava	David Sanikidze	Matvey Kozin	Ksenia Chagunava	~~Dzambolat Dulaev~~	Elvina Barkhitdinova
Hibla Gerzmava	Fyodor Shpagin	Anton Panzin	Chen Zi Zhan	Naira Gevorgyan	Boris Komlev
Hibla Gerzmava	Victoria Kaunova	Irina Podlesnaya	Sofia Larionova		
Anton Belyaev					
Anton Belyaev	Dzambolat Dulaev	Yonatan Tashchan	Alexey Osichev	~~Liana Zainullina~~	Ekaterina Semyonova
Anton Belyaev	Renata Tairova	Andrey Beletsky	Robert Shcherbakov	Emily Curie	Shalum Alkhasov
Anton Belyaev	Kira Kabirova	Evgenia Shakhnovich	Anastasia Ryngach		
Note: italicized names are artists stolen from another team during the battles or the knockouts (names struck through within former teams).

== The Blind Auditions ==
The show begins with the blind auditions. In each audition, an artist sings their piece in front of the coaches, whose chairs are facing the audience. If a coach is interested in working with the artist, they may press their button to face the artist. If only one coach presses the button, the artist automatically becomes part of their team. If multiple coaches turn, they will compete for the artist, who will decide which team they will join. As from season seven, each coach must have to complete its team with twelve artists. Each coach has granted three "blocks" instead of four from the previous season to prevent another coach from getting an artist.

The feature "Best Coach" is applied again this season.

✔	Coach pressed "I WANT YOU" button
✔	Coach pressed "I WANT YOU" button, even its team has already full
	Artist joined this coach's team
	Artist defaulted to a coach's team
	Artist was eliminated with no coach pressing their button
✘	Coach pressed "I WANT YOU" button, but was blocked by another coach from getting the artist
	Blocked by Basta; Blocked by Polina Gagarina; Blocked by Hibla Gerzmava; Blocked by Anton Belyaev

Episode	Order	Artist	Age	Origin	Song	Coach's and artist's choices			
Episode	Order	Artist	Age	Origin	Song	Basta	Gagarina	Gerzmava	Belyaev
Episode 1 (Note: Basta is The best coach of episode 1.) (January 31)	1	Valentina Yanshina	30	Ramenskoye	"Небо славян"	✔	✔	—	—
Episode 1 (January 31)	2	Ilya Altukhov	31	Komsomolsk-on-Amur	"Куплеты Мефистофеля"	✔	—	✔	✔
Episode 1 (January 31)	3	Volkan Jan Tashlyk	21	Almaty, Kazakhstan	"Никак"	—	—	—	—
Episode 1 (January 31)	4	Alexandra Chernousova	29	Komsomolsk-on-Amur	"I Put a Spell on You"	✔	—	—	—
Episode 1 (January 31)	5	Boris Komlev	43	Moscow	"Как молоды мы были"	—	—	✔	—
Episode 1 (January 31)	6	Natalya Sergienko	26	Rodionovo-Nesvetayskaya	"Emotions"	✔	✔	✔	✔
Episode 1 (January 31)	7	Grigory Galustyan	38	Mineralnye Vody	"Сам тебя выдумал"	—	—	—	—
Episode 1 (January 31)	8	Vera Mech	36	Moscow	"Всё, что касается"	—	—	—	—
Episode 1 (January 31)	9	Ilona Triandafillidi	29	Krymsk	"Je suis malade"	✔	✔	✘	✔
Episode 2 (Note: Basta is The best coach of episode 2.) (February 7)	1	Elvina Barkhitdinova	36	Verkhnyaya Pyshma	"Gopher Mambo"	✔	✔	✔	✔
Episode 2 (February 7)	2	Alexey Osichev	24	Slobozia, Moldova	"Стану ли я счастливей"	—	—	✔	✔
Episode 2 (February 7)	3	Alyona Koshkina	32	Kirov, Kirov Oblast	"Хорошие девчата"	—	—	—	—
Episode 2 (February 7)	4	Dmitry Nikanorov	31	Kimry	"Caruso"	—	—	—	—
Episode 2 (February 7)	5	Ulyana Zarva	17	Barnaul	"Drown in My Own Tears"	—	✔	—	✔
Episode 2 (February 7)	6	Yonatan Tashchan	24	Sevastopol, Ukraine	"Одно и то же"	✘	✔	✔	✔
Episode 2 (February 7)	7	Yulia Uchaykina	30	Vladivostok	"Кабриолет"	—	✔	—	—
Episode 2 (February 7)	8	Anton Panzin	17	Nizhny Novgorod	"Moondance"	—	—	✔	—
Episode 2 (February 7)	9	Viktoria Ustyuzhanina	24	Sergiyev Posad	"Львиное сердце"	—	—	—	—
Episode 2 (February 7)	10	Ksenia Chagunava	29	Moscow	"The House of the Rising Sun"	✔	✔	—	✘
Episode 3 (Note: Basta is The best coach of episode 3.) (February 14)	1	Anna Perevozkina	25	Borovsky, Tyumen Oblast	"Ой, там на горе"	✔	✔	✔	✔
Episode 3 (February 14)	2	David Sanikidze	23	Mezhdurechensk, Kemerovo Oblast	"Granada"	✔	✔	✔	✔
Episode 3 (February 14)	3	Valery Rogulin	36	Maykop	"Самолеты"	✔	—	—	—
Episode 3 (February 14)	4	Valeria Kuchma	21	Riga, Latvia	"Natural"	—	—	—	—
Episode 3 (February 14)	5	Giress Manguadi	37	Democratic Republic of the Congo	"Bella ciao"	—	—	—	—
Episode 3 (February 14)	6	Valeria Asonova	16	Kurchatov, Kursk Oblast	"Паромщица"	—	✔	—	—
Episode 3 (February 14)	7	Angelina Gorbunova	22	Balashov, Saratov Oblast	"Половина сердца"	—	—	—	—
Episode 3 (February 14)	8	Andrey Beletsky	31	Tashkent, Uzbekistan	"Kiss from a Rose"	✔	—	—	✔
Episode 3 (February 14)	9	Victoria Kaunova	32	Rostov-on-Don	"Что знает о любви любовь"	—	—	✔	—
Episode 3 (February 14)	10	Emily Curie	17	Moscow	"Tough Lover"	✔	✔	✘	✔
Episode 4 (Note: Basta is The best coach of episode 4.) (February 21)	1	Dmitry Klychkov	38	Nizhny Novgorod Oblast	"Мама, я 300"	—	✔	—	—
Episode 4 (February 21)	2	Sofia Larionova	20	Barnaul	"Ты не целуй"	—	✔	✔	✔
Episode 4 (February 21)	3	Maria Shelofast	35	Khabarovsk	"I See Red"	—	—	—	—
Episode 4 (February 21)	4	Chen Zi Zhan	24	Chengdu, China	"Katyusha"	—	—	✔	—
Episode 4 (February 21)	5	Victor Chesnokov	38	Korolyov, Moscow Oblast	"Il mare calmo della sera"	✔	✔	✘	✘
Episode 4 (February 21)	6	Yuri Kurnakov	22	Dzhankoi, Ukraine	"Wicked Game"	—	✔	✔	—
Episode 4 (February 21)	7	Natalia Tsikisheva	33	Mozdok, North Ossetia–Alania	"Клён"	—	—	—	—
Episode 4 (February 21)	8	Anton Starostin	34	Dimitrovgrad, Ulyanovsk Oblast	"Ты неси меня, река"	—	—	—	—
Episode 4 (February 21)	9	Daria Kotova	31	Moscow	"Живой"	✔	—	—	—
Episode 4 (February 21)	10	Mikhail Dimidov	38	Yekaterinburg	"Старинная солдатская"	—	✔	—	—
Episode 5 (Note: Basta is The best coach of episode 5.) (February 28)	1	Eleonora Detkova	27	Raduzhny, Khanty-Mansi Autonomous Okrug–Yugra	"Была любовь"	✔	✔	✘	✔
Episode 5 (February 28)	2	Mark Kondratiev	24	Moscow	"Gethsemane (I Only Want to Say)"	—	—	—	—
Episode 5 (February 28)	3	Renata Tairova	18	Astrakhan	"Пташечка"	—	✔	—	✔
Episode 5 (February 28)	4	Ignat Izotov	26	Kazan, Republic of Tatarstan	"Il mondo"	✘	✔	✔	✔
Episode 5 (February 28)	5	Khairiniso Akbarova	19	Tashkent, Uzbekistan	"Дорогой длинною"	—	—	—	—
Episode 5 (February 28)	6	Robert Shcherbakov	23	Novosibirsk	"All of Me"	—	—	—	✔
Episode 5 (February 28)	7	Danil Rakhmatulin	32	Uralsk, Kazakhstan	"Ночь"	—	—	—	—
Episode 5 (February 28)	8	Anastasia Ryngach	29	Yegoryevsk, Moscow Oblast	"Здесь хорошо"	—	✔	—	✔
Episode 5 (February 28)	9	Mila Novak	18	Moscow	"Smells Like Teen Spirit"	✔	—	—	—
Episode 5 (February 28)	10	Ekaterina Semyonova	20	Belgorod	"Anyone"	✔	✔	✔	✔
Episode 6 (Note: Basta is The best coach of episode 6.) (March 7)	1	Vladimir Grinchenko	30	Vladivostok	"Минор"	✔	✔	—	—
Episode 6 (March 7)	2	Olga Kozlova	33	Armavir, Krasnodar Krai	"The Csardas Princess"	—	✔	—	—
Episode 6 (March 7)	3	Andrey Rovkov	49	Baikonur, Kazakhstan	"Тоже является частью вселенной"	—	—	—	—
Episode 6 (March 7)	4	Evgenia Shakhnovich	30	Saint Petersburg	"Turn Up the Music"	✔	—	✔	✔
Episode 6 (March 7)	5	Amalia Krymskaya	22	Simferopol, Ukraine	"Титры"	—	—	—	—
Episode 6 (March 7)	6	Matvey Kozin	37	Zelenodolsk, Republic of Tatarstan	"Way Down We Go"	✔	✔	✔	✘
Episode 6 (March 7)	7	Anna Savchenko	43	Ulyanovsk	"Кажется"	—	—	—	—
Episode 6 (March 7)	8	Aymen Gabish	27	Tunisia	"Aïcha"	✔	—	—	✔
Episode 6 (March 7)	9	Irina Podlesnaya	29	Rostov-on-Don	"Hero"	—	—	✔	—
Episode 6 (March 7)	10	Kira Kabirova	21	Chelyabinsk	"My Heart Belongs to Daddy"	✔	✔	—	✔
Episode 7 (Note: Basta is The best coach of episode 7.) (March 14)	1	Dzambolat Dulaev	32	Vladikavkaz, Republic of North Ossetia–Alania	"Мелодия"	✔	—	✔	✘
Episode 7 (March 14)	2	Naira Gevorgyan	18	Moscow	"Mamma Knows Best"	—	—	✔	—
Episode 7 (March 14)	3	Arika Bodrova	24	Saint Petersburg	"Konchitsya leto"	—	—	—	—
Episode 7 (March 14)	4	Shalum Alkhasov	27	Nalchik, Kabardino-Balkarian Republic	"Miserere"	✔	—	—	✔
Episode 7 (March 14)	5	Veronika Meleksetyan	20	Rostov Oblast	"Земля"	✔	✔	—	—
Episode 7 (March 14)	6	Elizaveta Bryatko	22	Saratov	"Мой первый день"	Team full	—	—	—
Episode 7 (March 14)	7	Alon Nizamov	26	Moscow	"Human"	✔	✔	✔	✘
Episode 7 (March 14)	7	Alexandra Kiselyova	34	Feodosia, Ukraine	"Белая"	Team full	Team full	—	—
Episode 7 (March 14)	9	Fyodor Shpagin	17	Arzamas, Nizhny Novgorod Oblast	"Nature Boy"	Team full	Team full	✔	—
Episode 7 (March 14)	10	Alina Arakelova	23	Moscow	"Герой не моего романа"	Team full	Team full	Team full	—
Episode 7 (March 14)	11	Liana Zainullina	22	Kazan, Republic of Tatarstan	"Льдинка"	✔	✔	✔	✔

== The Battles ==
The Battle Rounds aired from March 21 to March 28, 2025. Contestants who win their battle would advance to the Knockout rounds. No steals were allowed in this round.

Colour key

Artist won the Battle and advanced to the Knockouts
Artist lost the Battle and was eliminated

Episode	Coach	Order	Winner	Song	Loser
Episode 8 (March 21) (Note: Basta is The best coach of episode 8.)	Basta	1	Valery Rogulin	«Проститься»	Ilona Triandafillidi
Episode 8 (March 21)	Polina Gagarina	2	Yulia Uchaykina	«Proud Mary»	Ulyana Zarva
Episode 8 (March 21)	Hibla Gerzmava	3	David Sanikidze	«Назови своё имя, любовь» / «Senza te»	Irina Podlesnaya
Episode 8 (March 21)	Anton Belyaev	4	Alexey Osichev	«Течёт река Волга»	Anastasia Ryngach
Episode 8 (March 21)	Basta	5	Natalya Sergienko	«Вижу тебя»	Daria Kotova
Episode 8 (March 21)	Hibla Gerzmava	6	Anton Panzin	«Somewhere»	Victoria Kaunova
Episode 8 (March 21)	Anton Belyaev	7	Andrey Beletsky	«Белая ночь»	Evgenia Shakhnovich
Episode 8 (March 21)	Hibla Gerzmava	8	Fyodor Shpagin	«If You're Not the One»	Sofia Larionova
Episode 8 (March 21)	Basta	9	Anna Perevozkina	«Воля»	Veronika Meleksetyan
Episode 8 (March 21)	Polina Gagarina	10	Alon Nizamov	«Свободна»	Vladimir Grinchenko
Episode 8 (March 21)	Anton Belyaev	11	Renata Tairova	«The Fool on the Hill»	Kira Kabirova
Episode 8 (March 21)	Polina Gagarina	12	Olga Kozlova	«Я тебя никогда не забуду»	Mikhail Dimidov
Episode 9 (March 28) (Note: Basta is The best coach of episode 9.)	Anton Belyaev	1	Yonatan Tashchan	«Улыбка»	Shalum Alkhasov
Episode 9 (March 28)	Basta	2	Eleonora Detkova	«We Found Love»	Alexandra Chernousova
Episode 9 (March 28)	Hibla Gerzmava	3	Elvina Barkhitdinova	«Вечная любовь»	Boris Komlev
Episode 9 (March 28)	Polina Gagarina	4	Valentina Yanshina	«Больно мне»	Dmitry Klychkov
Episode 9 (March 28)	Hibla Gerzmava	5	Matvey Kozin	«Океан»	Naira Gevorgyan
Episode 9 (March 28)	Anton Belyaev	6	Ekaterina Semyonova	«Somebody to Love»	Emily Curie
Episode 9 (March 28)	Basta	7	Ksenia Chagunava	«Фары»	Aymen Gabish
Episode 9 (March 28)	Polina Gagarina	8	Victor Chesnokov	«L'ultima Notte»	Ignat Izotov
Episode 9 (March 28)	Anton Belyaev	9	Liana Zainullina	«Вальс клоуна»	Robert Shcherbakov
Episode 9 (March 28)	Polina Gagarina	10	Valeria Asonova	«Если ты когда-нибудь меня простишь»	Yuri Kurnakov
Episode 9 (March 28)	Basta	11	Ilya Altukhov	«I Was Made for Lovin' You»	Mila Novak
Episode 9 (March 28)	Hibla Gerzmava	12	Dzambolat Dulaev	«Подмосковные вечера»	Chen Zi Zhan

== The Knockouts ==
The Knockout Rounds aired from April 4 to April 11, 2025. Similar to the previous two seasons, each coach pairs three artists into one knockout with only one contestant from the trio advances to the next round and also can steal one losing artist from another coach. The top 12 contestants moved on to the Semifinal.

Colour key

Artist won the Knockout and advanced to the Semifinal
Artist lost the Knockout but was stolen by another coach and advanced to the Semifinal
Artist lost the Knockout and was eliminated

Episode	Coach	Order	Song	Artists		Song	'Steal' result			
Episode	Coach	Order	Song	Winner	Losers	Song	Basta	Gagarina	Gerzmava	Belyaev
Episode 10 (April, 4) (Note: Basta is The best coach of episode 10.)	Polina Gagarina	1	«Метелица»	Valentina Yanshina	Alon Nizamov	«Unchain My Heart»	—	—N/a	—	—
Episode 10 (April, 4)	Polina Gagarina	1	«Метелица»	Valentina Yanshina	Olga Kozlova	«Улетай на крыльях ветра»	—	—N/a	—	—
Episode 10 (April, 4)	Basta	2	«Спасибо»	Valery Rogulin	Natalya Sergienko	«History Repeating»	—N/a	✔	—	—
Episode 10 (April, 4)	Basta	2	«Спасибо»	Valery Rogulin	Anna Perevozkina	«На горе мак»	—N/a	Team full	—	—
Episode 10 (April, 4)	Anton Belyaev	3	«Жестокая любовь»	Yonatan Tashchan	Andrey Beletsky	«Bitter Sweet Symphony»	—	Team full	—	—N/a
Episode 10 (April, 4)	Anton Belyaev	3	«Жестокая любовь»	Yonatan Tashchan	Liana Zainullina	«Земля»	✔	Team full	—	—N/a
Episode 10 (April, 4)	Hibla Gerzmava	4	«Go the Distance»	David Sanikidze	Anton Panzin	«Монолог»	Team full	Team full	—N/a	—
Episode 10 (April, 4)	Hibla Gerzmava	4	«Go the Distance»	David Sanikidze	Fyodor Shpagin	«Танго «Магнолия»»	Team full	Team full	—N/a	—
Episode 11 (April, 11) (Note: Basta is The best coach of episode 11.)	Anton Belyaev	1	«Right Here Waiting»	Alexey Osichev	Renata Tairova	«Вьюга»	Team full	Team full	—	—N/a
Episode 11 (April, 11)	Anton Belyaev	1	«Right Here Waiting»	Alexey Osichev	Ekaterina Semyonova	«Опять метель»	Team full	Team full	—	—N/a
Episode 11 (April, 11)	Polina Gagarina	2	«Несчастливая любовь»	Valeria Asonova	Yulia Uchaykina	«Firework»	Team full	Team full	—	—
Episode 11 (April, 11)	Polina Gagarina	2	«Несчастливая любовь»	Valeria Asonova	Victor Chesnokov	«Улетаю»	Team full	Team full	—	—
Episode 11 (April, 11)	Hibla Gerzmava	3	«If I Ever Lose My Faith in You»	Matvey Kozin	Dzambolat Dulaev	«Песня о далёкой Родине»	Team full	Team full	—N/a	✔
Episode 11 (April, 11)	Hibla Gerzmava	3	«If I Ever Lose My Faith in You»	Matvey Kozin	Elvina Barkhitdinova	«Город влюбленных людей»	Team full	Team full	—N/a	Team full
Episode 11 (April, 11)	Basta	4	«Ничто в полюшке не колышется»	Ilya Altukhov	Ksenia Chagunava	«You Lost Me»	Team full	Team full	✔	Team full
Episode 11 (April, 11)	Basta	4	«Ничто в полюшке не колышется»	Ilya Altukhov	Eleonora Detkova	«Верю в тебя»	Team full	Team full	Team full	Team full

== Live shows ==
Colour key:

Artist was saved
Artist was eliminated

=== Week 1: Top 12 — Semifinal (April 18) ===
The Live Top 12 Semifinal comprised episode 12. The top twelve artists performed, with two artists from each team advancing based on the sum of the viewers' and coach's votes.

Episode	Coach	Order	Artist	Song	Coach's vote (/100%)	Public's vote (/100%)	Votes' sum	Result
Episode 12 (April 18) (Note: Basta is The best coach of episode 12.)	Anton Belyaev	1	Alexey Osichev	«Небо на ладони»	30%	21,5%	51,5%	Eliminated
Episode 12 (April 18)	Anton Belyaev	2	Yonatan Tashchan	«Black Hole Sun»	50%	12,3%	62,3%	Advanced
Episode 12 (April 18)	Anton Belyaev	3	Dzambolat Dulaev	«Ты меня любишь»	20%	66,2%	86,2%	Advanced
Episode 12 (April 18)	Polina Gagarina	4	Valeria Asonova	«Эти цветы так кстати»	20%	22,9%	42,9%	Eliminated
Episode 12 (April 18)	Polina Gagarina	5	Natalya Sergienko	«Heaven»	30%	23,6%	53,6%	Advanced
Episode 12 (April 18)	Polina Gagarina	6	Valentina Yanshina	«Реченька»	50%	53,5%	103,5%	Advanced
Episode 12 (April 18)	Hibla Gerzmava	7	Ksenia Chagunava	«Старый клён»	20%	23%	43%	Eliminated
Episode 12 (April 18)	Hibla Gerzmava	8	Matvey Kozin	«Достучаться до небес»	30%	22,9%	52,9%	Advanced
Episode 12 (April 18)	Hibla Gerzmava	9	David Sanikidze	«La donna è mobile»	50%	54,1%	104,1%	Advanced
Episode 12 (April 18)	Basta	10	Liana Zainullina	«Love of My Life»	20%	31,6%	51,6%	Eliminated
Episode 12 (April 18)	Basta	11	Valery Rogulin	«Не плачь»	30%	27,3%	57,3%	Advanced
Episode 12 (April 18)	Basta	12	Ilya Altukhov	«Belle»	50%	41,1%	91,1%	Advanced

=== Week 2: Final and Superfinal (April 25) ===
The top eight artists performed on April 25, 2025, with one artist from each team advancing to the Superfinal based on the voting of the viewers.

==== Final ====
Episode	Coach	Order	Artist	Song	Public's vote	Result
Episode 13 (April 19)	Basta	1	Valery Rogulin	«Ну и что»	37,4%	Eliminated
Episode 13 (April 19)	Basta	2	Ilya Altukhov	«Пой, гитара»	62,6%	Advanced
Episode 13 (April 19)	Polina Gagarina	3	Natalya Sergienko	«Сто часов счастья»	43,9%	Eliminated
Episode 13 (April 19)	Polina Gagarina	4	Valentina Yanshina	«Широка река»	56,1%	Advanced
Episode 13 (April 19)	Hibla Gerzmava	5	Matvey Kozin	«Ноктюрн»	18,1%	Eliminated
Episode 13 (April 19)	Hibla Gerzmava	6	David Sanikidze	«All by Myself»	81,9%	Advanced
Episode 13 (April 19)	Anton Belyaev	7	Yonatan Tashchan	«Somebody to Love»	31,7%	Eliminated
Episode 13 (April 19)	Anton Belyaev	8	Dzambolat Dulaev	«Любовь настала»	68,3%	Advanced

==== Superfinal ====
Episode	Coach	Order	Artist	Song	Public's vote	Result
Episode 13 (April 19)
Episode 13 (April 19)	Basta	1	Ilya Altukhov	«Благодарю тебя»	17,5%	Third place
Episode 13 (April 19)	Polina Gagarina	2	Valentina Yanshina	«Виновата ли я»	15,3%	Fourth place
Episode 13 (April 19)	Hibla Gerzmava	3	David Sanikidze	«Верни мне музыку»	38%	Winner
Episode 13 (April 19)	Anton Belyaev	4	Dzambolat Dulaev	«Очарована, околдована»	29,2%	Runner-up

Performer	Song
David Sanikidze (winner)	«Smuglyanka»

== Best Coach ==
The Best Coach from the previous two seasons returned this season. Basta was voted as the best coach, with Hibla Gerzmava finishing in second, Polina Gagarina in third, and Anton Belyaev in fourth.

- Best Coach
- Second place
- Third place
- Fourth place
- Episode's Best Coach

Coach	Public's vote _{(per episode)}													Result
Coach	#1	#2	#3	#4	#5	#6	#7	#8	#9	#10	#11	#12	Av.	Result
Basta	45%	39%	39%	36%	42%	40%	34%	34%	34%	33%	29%	29%	36%	Best coach
Hibla Gerzmava	11%	22%	26%	21%	20%	21%	28%	28%	24%	24%	24%	27%	23%	Second place
Polina Gagarina	29%	22%	21%	29%	23%	24%	22%	23%	21%	22%	20%	20%	23%	Third place
Anton Belyaev	15%	17%	14%	14%	15%	15%	16%	15%	21%	21%	27%	24%	18%	Fourth place
