= 9 (Polina Gagarina album) =

Studio album by Polina Gagarina
- Released: September 9, 2016
- Recorded: June–August 2016
- Genre: Pop
- Languages: Russian, English
- Label: Gazgolder
- Producers: Polina Gagarina, Basta, Roman Capella

Polina Gagarina chronology
O sebe (2010)	9 (2016)	Vdokh (2022)

Singles from 9
- 1. "Day" Released: 12 November 2014; 2. "Tantsuy so mnoy" Released: 26 August 2016; 3. "Stanu solntsem" Released: 27 October 2016

9 is the third solo album by Russian pop star Polina Gagarina. It was released 9 September 2016.

== Background ==
Towards the end of 2014, Gagarina announced that she had started working on a new album, which would be entirely in English. On 12 November 2014, she released the single "Day" which was created after a collaboration with Anton Belyaev, the frontman of Therr Maitz. In 2015, work on the album was postponed as Gagarina was preparing for the Eurovision Song Contest 2015, where she finished second with the song "A Million Voices". In June 2015, Gagarina stopped working with Konstantin Meladze, with whom she had released a number of successful singles including "Spektakl Okonchen", "Nyet", "Navek" and "Shagay".

== About the album ==
The album was recorded in Moscow in the summer of 2016 at the studio of the label "Gazgolder". There Gagarina, with the head of the label, Basta, recorded the single "Golos". He introduced her to Roman Capella, who helped collaborate on the album. The album was named 9 as it was a symbolic and happy figure for Gagarina, stating that the number is a symbol of one's spiritual maturity and that the number represents wisdom and enlightenment. Leading up to the album's release, "Tantsuy so mnoy" was released on 26 August. The day prior to the release, a live broadcast on VK took place, where Gagarina spoke about the details of the album. The following day, it was released on iTunes and Apple Music.

== Critical reception ==
Alexey Mazhaev from InterMedia gave the album three stars out of five, stating that the album's release was met with great interest. He labelled it as experimental, but was dissatisfied with the fact that Gagarina had ignored the "spiritual requests of fans of Russian pop music" as the songs contain the active use of modern Western pop culture but few lyrics. Boris Barabanov, from the Kommersant newspaper, noted that the album is split into two parts, Russian and English. He stated that the English side of the album contained more mature songs which could be played on radio stations all across Europe. However, he also says that none of the songs on the tracklist are massive hits. The album also topped the Russian iTunes charts.

== Tracklist ==
No.	Title	Lyrics	Music	Length
1.	"Интро" (Intro)			1:34
2.	"Стану солнцем" (Stanu solntsem)	E. Kovskaya	P. Gagarina	4:33
3.	"Танцуй со мной" (Tantsuy so mnoy)	E. Kovskaya	P. Gagarina	3:56
4.	"Не отпускай" (Ne otpuskay feat. Ifeyopa)	E. Kovskaya	P. Gagarina	3:47
5.	"Высоко" (Vysoko)	P. Gagarina	P. Gagarina	3:41
6.	"Целого мира мало" (Tselogo mira malo feat. Basta)	E. Kovskaya, V. Vakulenko, M. Mironov	P. Gagarina	5:09
7.	"Intro"			1:37
8.	"Plastic"	P. Gagarina	P. Gagarina	3:26
9.	"Forbidden Love"	P. Gagarina	P. Gagarina	4:18
10.	"Free"	P. Gagarina	P. Gagarina	4:32
11.	"Hands Off"	P. Gagarina	P. Gagarina	3:44
12.	"Day" (Cvpellv Edit)	P. Gagarina	P. Gagarina, A. Belyaev	4:55

== Personnel ==
=== Musicians ===
- Polina Gagarina
- Anton Belyaev
- CVPELLV
- Sergey Rybchinsky
- Alexander Merzlyakov
- Andrey Timonin
- Grigory Golubev

=== Production ===
- Polina Gagarina
- Roman Kozlov
- Basta
