= PutinTeam =

Social movement

- Named after: Vladimir Putin
- Formation: 2 November 2017; 9 years ago
- Founder: Alexander Ovechkin
- Legal status: Active
- Purpose: To support Russian president Vladimir Putin
- Website: https://putin-team.ru//

PutinTeam is a social movement announced in 2017 by NHL player Alexander Ovechkin to support Russian President Vladimir Putin and his 2018 Russian presidential campaign.

Ovechkin has a personal relationship with Putin. Ovechkin has a personal phone number for Putin and received a present from Putin at his wedding in 2016.

PutinTeam was first announced in a 2 November 2017 post on Ovechkin’s Instagram account, which has over one million followers. On 23 November, Ovechkin announced on his Instagram that the group's official website had been launched. On the soft launch of the site, visitors were encouraged to sign up for the team, track related news, participate in contests and attend and organize events.

Ovechkin has claimed that the idea for PutinTeam was all his and that the group is non-political in its nature. However, Vedomosti, a Russian financial newspaper, reported that Kremlin sources have said that IMA-Consulting (under sanctions by New Zealand, the UK, and Ukraine) were behind the creation of the organization.

The Kremlin spoke in support of the movement after its announcement.

Fellow NHL player Evgeni Malkin, who announced his own support for the movement, stated, "We want (Putin) to understand that we support him….We just try to offer our support because, in 2018, we have the World Cup in Russia; they have elections, too".

In addition Alexander Ovechkin, the PutinTeam movement also included many Russian sportsmen, actors, musicians and social activists: Evgeni Malkin, Yelena Isinbayeva, Sergey Karjakin, Sergey Tetyukhin, Nikolay Rastorguyev, Polina Gagarina, Dima Bilan, Ilya Kovalchuk, Nyusha, Andrey Merzlikin, Pavel Bure, Evgeni Plushenko, Nikolay Baskov, Sergei Krikalev, Mikhail Galustyan, Alexander Legkov, Anton Shipulin, Ivan Tcherezov, Alexandr Karelin and others.
