= Irish Theatre Magazine =

Print and later online-only journal in Ireland

Irish Theatre Magazine was an online cultural journal dedicated to in-depth coverage of theatre and the performing arts in Ireland.

Founded in Dublin in 1998 by Karen Fricker and Willie White, from modest beginnings ITM established itself as a highly respected quarterly cultural print journal. Produced by a small team led by editor-in-chief (1998–2005) Karen Fricker, with managing editor Maura O'Keefe and art director Susan Conley, it was funded by the Arts Council of Ireland (An Chomhairle Ealaíon).

From 2005, it was edited by Helen Meany, and continued to expand its news and feature coverage of all aspects of the performing arts, while upholding its commitment to review every new Irish professional theatre production. Its readership included theatre artists, professionals and keen audience members.

In 2009, at the encouragement of the Arts Council, ITM moved exclusively online, with a new website launched in September 2009.

In 2014, Irish Theatre Magazine ceased operations and created a comprehensive digital archive of the publication.
