= O sebe =

Studio album by Polina Gagarina
- Released: March 11, 2010
- Recorded: 2007–10
- Genre: Pop
- Language: Russian
- Label: APC Records
- Producer: Polina Gagarina, Evgeniy Kuritsyn, Irina Dubtsova, Artem Ulanov, Nikolay Rostov, Pavel Vinogradov

Polina Gagarina chronology
Poprosi u oblakov (2007)	O sebe (2010)	9 (2016)

Singles from O sebe
- 1. "Lyubov pod soltsem" Released: 25 July 2007; 2. "Gde-to zhivyot lyubov" Released: 22 April 2008; 3. "Komu, zachem?" Released: 18 November 2008; 4. "Propadi vsyo" Released: 28 October 2009

O sebe is the second solo album by Russian pop star Polina Gagarina. It was released on 11 March 2010.

== Critical reception ==
Alexey Mazhaev from InterMedia gave the album three stars out of five, stating that whilst "Oy!" and "Vinovata ya" are some of the weaker tracks on the playlist, "Lyubov pod soltsem", "Gde-to zhivyot lyubov", "Tayu" and "Komu, zachem?" are definite hits. The Mirmadzhi website gave the album a mixed rating, singling out "Vinovata ya", "Polyushka", "Bez obid" and "Propadi vsyo propadom" as the best songs in the tracklist. The author of the article stated that the album is replete with songs, which hold humour, enthusiasm and fervour.

== Tracklist ==
No.	Title	Lyrics	Music	Length
1.	"Любовь под солнцем" (Lyubov pod soltsem)	A. Ulanov	N. Rostov	3:32
2.	"Ой" (Oy)	P. Gagarina	P. Gagarina	3:26
3.	"Мелочи жизни" (Melochi zhizni)	I. Dubtsova	P. Gagarina	3:47
4.	"Виновата я" (Vinovata ya)	P. Gagarina, I. Dubtsova, P. Vinogradov	P. Gagarina	3:27
5.	"Где-то живёт любовь" (Gde-to zhivyot lyubov)	P. Gagarina	P. Gagarina	4:34
6.	"Полюшка" (Polyushka)	P. Gagarina, P. Vinogradov	P. Gagarina, P. Vinogradov	3:08
7.	"Без обид" (Bez obid)	P. Gagarina, I. Dubtsova	P. Gagarina	3:38
8.	"Таю" (Tayu)	E. Kuritsyn	E. Kuritsyn	3:50
9.	"Кому, зачем?" (Komu, Zachem? feat. Irina Dubtsova)	I. Dubtsova	I. Dubtsova	4:10
10.	"Пропади всё пропадом" (Propadi vsyo propadom)	P. Gagarina	P. Gagarina	3:56
11.	"Где-то живёт любовь (Remix)" (Gde-to zhivyot lyubov)	P. Gagarina	P. Gagarina	3:31
