= Karen Fricker =

Karen Fricker (born 1966) is a professor at Brock University and a professional theatre critic, focusing her research in contemporary theatre and globalization, contemporary Québec theatre, popular performances of nation and cultural identities, and Irish theatre. Fricker is the founding editor-in-chief of Irish Theatre Magazine, an online cultural journal that provided coverage of theatre and the performing arts in Ireland. She has also reviewed and broadcast for outlets such as The Guardian, Variety, The New York Times, the BBC, and the CBC. She is a former theatre critic for the Toronto Star.

Fricker's recent publications include "Le goût du risque: Kà de Robert Lepage et du Cirque du Soleil" (Risky Business: Robert Lepage and the Cirque du Soleil's Kà) and "À l'Heure zéro de la culture (dés)unie. Problèmes de représentation dans Zulu Time de Robert Lepage et Ex Machina" (The Zero Hour of Cultural (Dis)-Unity: The Problem of Robert Lepage and Ex Machina's Zulu Time).

She was co-investigator of a study of the Eurovision Song Contest. Her co-edited volume, Performing the 'New' Europe: Identities, Feelings, and Politics in the Eurovision Song Contest, was published in May 2013, and explores the Eurovision Song Contest as a "symbolic contact zone between European cultures" and brings together the opinions of scholars from both Europe and North America.

Fricker has also received a British Academy research grant to write Making Theatre Global: Robert Lepage's Original Stage Productions, a monograph set to appear in Manchester University Press's Theatre: Theory-Practice-Performance series.

As a professor, Fricker lectured from 2007 to 2012 at Royal Holloway, University of London for Drama and Theatre. In autumn of 2012 she was the Eakin Visiting Scholar at the McGill Institute for the Study of Canada, where she was awarded the first Charles Bronfman and Rita Mayo Award for Excellence in Teaching on her Fall 2013 course, "Performing Québec in the Global Age". She is currently in Brock University's Department of Dramatic Arts since 2013 and teaches in the Theatre Praxis Concentration.
