= Hibla Gerzmava =

Russian opera singer (born 1970)

- Хибла Герзмава
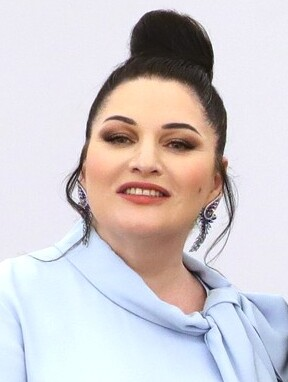
- Gerzmava in 2021
- Born: Hibla Levarsovna Gerzmava; 6 January 1970 (age 56); Pitsunda, Abkhaz ASSR, Georgian SSR, Soviet Union
- Occupation: Operatic soprano
- Years active: 1995–present
- Website: www.hibla.ru

Hibla Levarsovna Gerzmava (Abkhaz: Хьыбла Леуарса-иҧҳа Герзмаа; Russian: Хи́бла Лева́рсовна Герзма́ва; born 6 January 1970) is an Abkhazian-Russian operatic soprano who currently resides in Moscow.

== Education and career ==
Since 1995 Gerzmava has been a soloist of the Stanislavski and Nemirovich-Danchenko Theatre.

In 2008 Gerzmava made her Covent Garden debut as Tatyana in Eugene Onegin. Her voice being described as clear and focused, yet also full of colour and with a reservoir of power that enables her to ride the biggest fortes like a surfer on a wave. In the winter of 2009, Gerzmava performed for the first time the role of Lucia in the Stanislavski and Nemirovich-Danchenko Theatre.

In September–October 2010, Gerzmava made her Metropolitan Opera debut in the parts of Stella and Antonia in Jacques Offenbach's The Tales of Hoffmann, and in November–December 2011 she went back there to sing Mimi in Franco Zeffirelli's production of La bohème. Gerzmava took part in the closing ceremony of the 22nd Winter Olympic Games that took place at the Fisht Olympic Stadium in Sochi.

== Festival ==
The festival was born in 2001. On a stage of Pitsunda Cathedral and the Abkhazian State Philharmonic acted Elena Obraztsova, Vladimir Spivakov, Ildar Abdrazakov, pianist Denis Matsuev, Deborah Brown, Daniel Kramer's trio, Yakov Okun, Felix Korobov, the Kazan state orchestra "La Primavera" and other known Russian collectives. The eighth festival of classical music has passed In September, 2009. In year 2014 for the first time the Festival was running in Moscow.

== Repertoire ==
- Ludmila in Ruslan and Ludmila by Mikhail Glinka
- The Swan in The Tale of Tsar Saltan by Nikolai Rimsky-Korsakov
- Queen of Shemakha in The Golden Cockerel by Nikolai Rimsky-Korsakov
- Louise in Betrothal in a Monastery by Sergei Prokofiev
- Tatyana in Eugene Onegin by Pyotr Ilyich Tchaikovsky
- Nymph in Daphne by Marco da Gagliano
- Rosina in Il Barbiere di Siviglia by Gioachino Rossini
- Adina in L'elisir d'amore by Gaetano Donizetti
- Violetta in La traviata by Giuseppe Verdi
- Musetta and Mimi in La bohème by Giacomo Puccini
- Adele in Die Fledermaus by Johann Strauss II
- Vitelia in La clemenza di Tito by Wolfgang Amadeus Mozart
- Lucia in Lucia di Lammermoor by Gaetano Donizetti
- Donna Anna, Zerlina in Don Giovanni by Wolfgang Amadeus Mozart
- Parasha in Mavra by Igor Stravinsky
- Liu in Turandot by Giacomo Puccini
- Amelia Grimaldi in Simon Boccanegra by Giuseppe Verdi
- Olympia, Antonia, Giulietta in The Tales of Hoffmann by Jacques Offenbach
- Médée in Médée by Luigi Cherubini

== Recognitions and awards ==
- The International Rimsky-Korsakov Competition. St.-Petersburg (Russia). 2nd Prize Winner.

2001

- The Golden Orpheus Opera Festival. Moscow (Russia). The Best Singer Award.

2006

- Gerzmava was made an Merited Artist of the Russian Federation by Russian president Vladimir Putin.

2010

- The Golden Mask. Moscow (Russia). The Best Female Role.

2012

- People's Artist of Russia
