= Anton Belyaev =

Russian musician (born 1979)

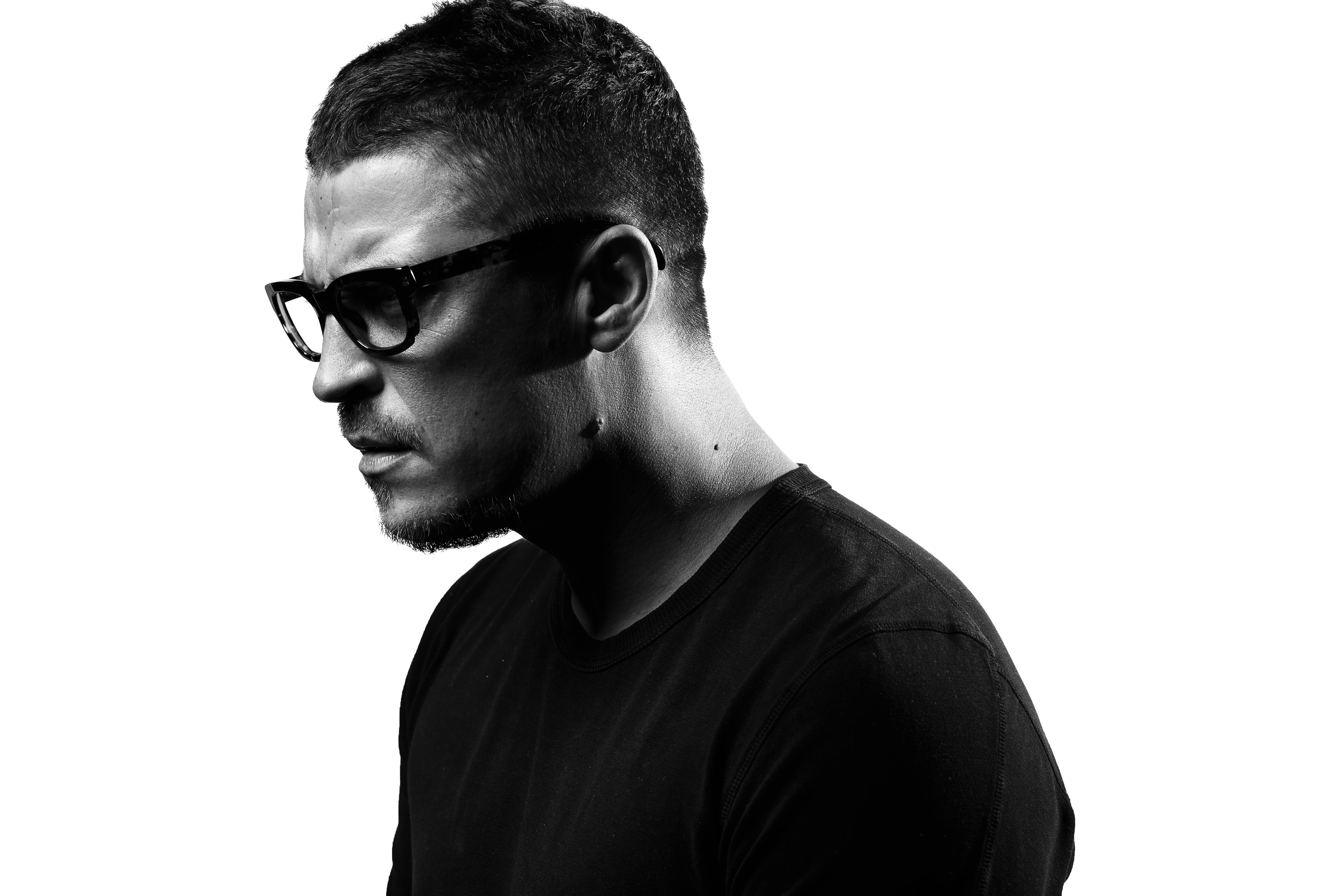
- Anton Belyaev performing with his band, Therr Maitz, at Sziget Festival, 2016

Background information
- Born: September 18, 1979 (age 46); Magadan, Russian SFSR, Soviet Union
- Genres: Electro; chillout; house; indie
- Occupations: Composer; singer; arranger; sound producer
- Years active: 1998–present
- Spouse: Yulia Aleksandrovna Belyaeva (m. 2017)

Anton Vadimovich Belyaev (born September 18, 1979) is a Russian singer, musician, composer, and producer, best known as the leader and frontman of the Russian band Therr Maitz. Belyaev gained recognition as a semi-finalist on the Russian version of The Voice.

== Early life and education ==
Anton Belyaev was born on September 18, 1979, in Magadan.

In 1984, at the age of five, Belyaev began his musical education at a music school in Magadan, Russia. Initially interested in studying drums, he instead opted for piano classes due to his young age. He participated in music contests and received awards.

At the age of thirteen, Belyaev began studying at Evgeny Chernonog's jazz studio. By 14, he was performing jazz compositions with jazz musicians in Magadan. At 16, Belyaev joined a youth jazz orchestra and recorded jazz standards alongside Evgeny Chernonog on two pianos.

When Belyaev turned 17, his mother encouraged him to move to Khabarovsk, Russia, where he was admitted to the Khabarovsk State Institute of Art and Culture, specializing in pop-jazz.

== Professional career ==
In October 1998, Belyaev worked as a musician in clubs in Khabarovsk. By 2004, he had become the art director of the "Rus" club, where he assembled a group of musicians, including Dmitry Pavlov (guitar), Maksim Bondarenko (bass), Konstantin Drobyt’ko (trumpet), and Evgeny Kozhin (drums). Utilizing the club's resources, Belyaev began creating music that would later form the basis of Therr Maitz.

In 2006, Belyaev moved to Moscow, where he worked as an arranger for four years. While in Moscow, he collaborated with artists such as Tamara Gverdtsiteli, Igor Grigoriev, Maksim Pokrovsky, and Polina Gagarina. In 2013, Belyaev participated in the second season of the Russian version of The Voice. All four mentors of the show selected him, and he chose Leonid Agutin as his coach. He was eliminated by Agutin after the second round, but was subsequently saved by Russian ethnic singer Pelageya. Belyaev exited the show during the semifinal stage. During the autumn of 2014, Belyaev supported the Russian Greenpeace project "Million for Separate Collection" and presented the song "Stop. Quiet" as a gift to those advocating for waste recycling.

In 2015, Belyaev served as a sound producer for the TV show "Main Stage" ("Glavnaya Scena") on Channel Rossiya-1, working on Igor Matvienko's team. He also served as a jury member during the qualifying castings.

On 7 January 2015, the film "Voices of a Big Country" ("Golosa bolshoi strany") was released, with Anton Belyaev serving as the sound producer and composer for the movie.

Towards the end of 2016, Belyaev created music for the immersive play "The Returning" ("Vernuvshiesya"), which premiered on 1 December 2016, in Moscow. The play was a collaboration between directors Viktor Karina and Mia Zanette from the New York theatre company Journey Lab and Russian producers Vyacheslav Dusmuhametov and Miguel (choreographer and mentor of the TV show "Dances" ("Tancy") on TNT Channel).

On 14 February 2018, the Russian film "The Ice" premiered. Belyaev composed the film's music in collaboration with Dmitriy Selipanov. The film subsequently premiered in Germany, China, and South Korea.

In 2019, Belyaev participated in the advertising campaign for UNIQLO, promoting a new collection and introducing an online shop in Russia.

== Personal life ==
In 2012, Belyaev married Yulia Aleksandrovna Belyaeva. On May 22, 2017, Anton and Yulia had a son, Semyon.

== Awards ==
Belyaev was nominated for the GQ award "Man of the Year 2015" in the category of "Musician of the Year." In 2016, he was featured in GQ's list of "50 Most Stylish Men." Additionally, he was named "The Most Stylish Man" at the Fashion Summer Awards 2016 by the Fashion TV channel. Selipanov and Yulia were recognized as one of GQ's "25 Most Stylish Couples of 2017." In 2018, Belyaev was included in GQ's list of the "100 Most Stylish Men."

In 2019, Belyaev and composer Dmitriy Selipanov were awarded "The Golden Eagle" for their music in the film "The Ice.""
