= A Million Voices (song) =

2015 single by Polina Gagarina

Single by Polina Gagarina
- Released: 7 April 2015
- Recorded: 2015
- Genre: Pop, pop rock
- Length: 3:05
- Label: Universal Music Group
- Songwriters: Gabriel Alares; Joakim Björnberg; Katrina Noorbergen; Leonid Gutkin; Vladimir Matetsky
- Producers: Magnus Wallin; Gustaf Svenungsson; Joakim Björnberg

Polina Gagarina singles chronology
"Шагай" (2014)	"A Million Voices" (2015)	"Кукушка" (2015)

Eurovision Song Contest 2015 entry
- Country: Russia
- Artist: Polina Gagarina
- Language: English
- Composers: G. Alares; J. Björnberg; K. Noorbergen; L. Gutkin; V. Matetsky
- Lyricists: G. Alares; J. Björnberg; K. Noorbergen; L. Gutkin; V. Matetsky

Finals performance
- Semi-final result: 1st
- Semi-final points: 182
- Final result: 2nd
- Final points: 303

Entry chronology
- ◄ "Shine" (2014)
- "You Are the Only One" (2016) ►

"A Million Voices" is the name of the song that represented Russia in the Eurovision Song Contest 2015. It was performed by the Russian singer, songwriter, actress, and model Polina Gagarina. In the grand final, it received 303 points, finishing second, becoming the first second-placed song ever to receive more than 300 points in the Eurovision Song Contest. The song is written by Swedish songwriters Gabriel Alares, Joakim Björnberg, by Australian Katrina Noorbergen and by Russians Leonid Gutkin and Vladimir Matetsky.

== Critical reception ==
Charlotte Runcie of The Daily Telegraph described the song as "synth-heavy with oodles of key changes, on record it sounds quite a lot like a standard karaoke ballad - think Take That-lite".

== Music video ==
The music video of the song was presented on March 15, 2015. On the same day it was published on the official channel of the contest on YouTube and gained more than 10 million views, making it the most watched Eurovision 2015 music video on the contest's channel.

The shooting of the video involved 25 people, including children, adults and elderly people of different races and nationalities, The Holi part is the end.

== Political controversy ==
The 63-year-old singing contest in which viewers phone in to vote for their favourite has always largely been political, says Karen Fricker, a professor of Dramatic Arts at the Brock University of Canada who was in Vienna for the grand final. "The song is extremely effective and I would argue, manipulative," says Fricker, "because it's one of those songs that's all about how we should all get together and link hands and be human beings together and believe in peace", and added, "We have to bear in mind this song is representing Russia, a country that is very involved in aggressive foreign relations at the moment".

Before the final, Fricker pointed out that Gagarina did not earn boos from the crowd. While she acknowledged it may be a reflection of the Russo-Ukrainian war becoming less popular news, Fricker told CTV News, "it's also perhaps because fans just love the song".

== Booing in the presentation ==
The live audience could be heard booing whenever a country awarded points to Russia at the song contest, which took place at the Wiener Stadthalle in Vienna, prompting one of the hosts to remind the audience that “music should stand over politics tonight”. Conchita Wurst, who was condemned by leading Russian religious figures following her win last year, called the boos “incomprehensible” and said that Gagarina “cannot be blamed for the rules” in her home country.

The booing was thought to be linked to Russia's anti-LGBT policies and its involvement in the war in Ukraine. Conservative Russians viewed Conchita Wurst as a threat to traditional family values, and expressed concern about hosting the Eurovision Song Contest if Russia won. Despite the negative reaction from the Eurovision crowd, Russia's entry Polina Gagarina came in a respectable second place after Sweden's Måns Zelmerlöw took the crown with the song Heroes. Anti-booing technology was reportedly installed in Wiener Stadthalle to prevent boos from being heard on television.

Russia's communications coordinator for Eurovision told The Moscow Times: “It was very embarrassing for us last year when this happened, as it was not the spirit of the contest. "We are here to build bridges, as the motto [of the contest] says".

== Track listing ==
Digital download – single

1. A Million Voices – 3:05

== Charts ==
=== Weekly charts ===
Chart (2015)	Peak position
Australia (ARIA)	79
Austria (Ö3 Austria Top 40)	10
Belgium (Ultratop 50 Flanders)	22
Belgium (Ultratop 50 Wallonia)	38
CIS Airplay (TopHit)	123
Finland (Suomen virallinen lista)	23
Germany (GfK)	46
Iceland (Tónlist)	4
Ireland (IRMA)	86
Netherlands (Single Top 100)	99
Russia (2M)	1
Scottish Singles Sales (Official Charts)	55
Sweden (Sverigetopplistan)	26
Switzerland (Schweizer Hitparade)	39
UK Singles (Official Charts)	97
UK (UK Single Downloads Chart)	61
