= Poprosi u oblakov =

Studio album by Polina Gagarina
- Released: July 12, 2007
- Recorded: 2005–07
- Genre: Pop
- Language: Russian, English
- Label: APC Records
- Producer: Polina Gagarina, Evgeniy Kuritsyn, Konstantin Meladze

Polina Gagarina chronology
Poprosi u oblakov (2007)	O sebe (2010)

Singles from Poprosi u oblakov
- 1. "Kolybelnaya" Released: 2005; 2. "Ya tvoya" Released: 2006; 3. "Morning" Released: 2006; 4. "Ya tebya ne proschu nikogda" Released: 2007

Poprosi u oblakov is the debut solo album by Russian singer Polina Gagarina. It was released on 12 July 2007.

== Critical reception ==
Alexey Mazhaev from InterMedia gave the album three stars out of five, stating that "Ya tebya ne proschu nikogda" and "Morning" were the best songs on the playlist. Vitaliy Shramkov from Russian Billboard stated that the album flowed more like a collation of songs rather than a single album, however the presentation, lyrics and intonation made it stand out. Konstantin Kudryashov from TopPop.ru expressed a very positive review about the album, with the best songs being "Ya tvoya" and "Ty moy" where Gagarina had experimented with folk music. He stated that she could, with a few amendments, claim the title of "Russian Björk".

== Tracklist ==
No.	Title	Writer(s)	Length
1.	"Я твоя" (Ya tvoya)	P. Gagarina	2:50
2.	"Ветер" (Veter)	P. Gagarina	3:37
3.	"Give Up"	P. Gagarina	2:52
4.	"Morning"	P. Gagarina	4:06
5.	"Я тебя не прощу никогда" (Ya tebya ne proschu nikogda)	K. Meladze	4:12
6.	"Помню" (Pomnyu)	P. Gagarina	3:16
7.	"Don't Waste Your Time"	P. Gagarina	3:05
8.	"Прикосновенья" (Prikosnovenya)	E. Kuritsyn	3:18
9.	"Ты мой" (Ty moy)	P. Gagarina	3:18
10.	"Time Stop"	P. Gagarina	4:04
11.	"Колыбельная" (Kolybelnaya)	P. Gagarina	3:29
12.	"Колыбельная (remix)" (Kolybelnaya)	P. Gagarina	3:42
