= Polina Gagarina =

Russian singer and songwriter (born 1987)

Polina Gagarina Полина Гагарина
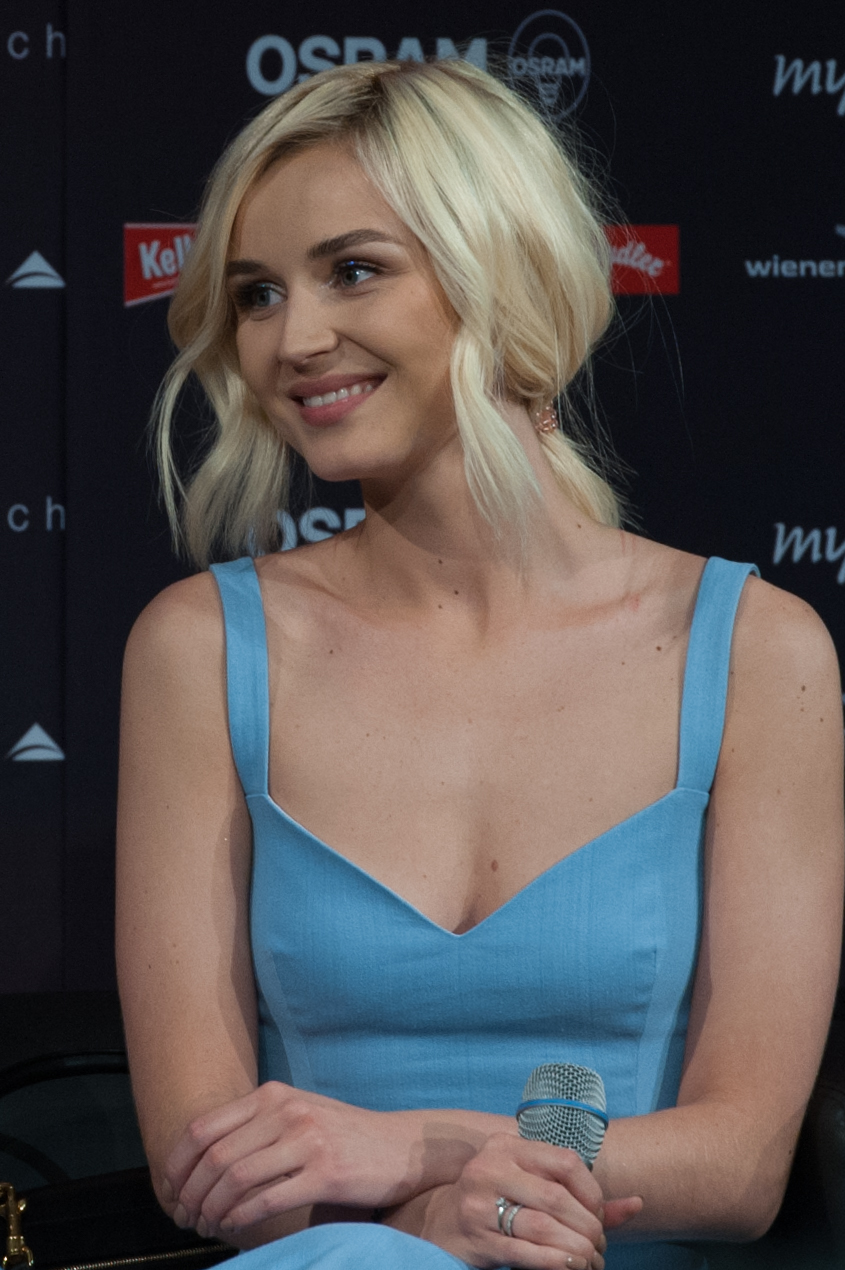
- Gagarina in 2015

Background information
- Born: Polina Sergeyevna Gagarina; 27 March 1987 (age 39); Moscow, Russian SFSR, Soviet Union
- Genres: pop
- Occupations: singer; songwriter; actress
- Years active: 2003–present
- Website: gagarina.com

Polina Sergeyevna Gagarina (Russian: Полина Сергеевна Гагарина, IPA: [pɐˈlʲinə sʲɪrˈɡʲe(j)ɪvnə ɡɐˈɡarʲɪnə]; born 27 March 1987) is a Russian singer and songwriter. She represented Russia in the Eurovision Song Contest 2015 with "A Million Voices" where she finished second with 303 points. In doing so, she became the first second-placed finisher to exceed 300 points. Gagarina also participated in the Chinese reality-competition Singer in 2019, where she was one of the finalists.

She was the tenth-highest Russian earner on Instagram and YouTube in 2021, with net revenue of about 6 million US dollars from 8.9 million subscribers.

== Biography ==
Polina Gagarina was born in Moscow, but spent most of her youth in Greece. Her mother was a ballet dancer. In 1993, Gagarina's father died and her mother decided to move back to Russia, but they soon moved back to Greece and settled in Athens.

After completing her education, she moved to Saratov to live with her grandmother. Besides her native language Russian, she is also fluent in Greek.

== Career ==
=== 2003–07: Poprosi u oblakov ===
In 2003, Gagarina competed in season two of Star Factory, a Russian reality singing competition. She performed several songs by Maxim Fadeev and went on to win the show, but refused to work with Fadeev after her victory. After winning Star Factory, Gagarina was invited to perform in the group Playgirls. The group received a recording contract with ARS Records, but ultimately disbanded. She later released the singles "Kolybelnaya", "Morning", "Ya tvoya", "Pomnyu", and "Ya tebya ne proshchu nikogda". Her debut album Poprosi u oblakov was released in 2007.

=== 2008–12: O sebe ===
In 2008, Gagarina released the single "Komu, zachem?", a duet with Russian singer Irina Dubtsova. In March 2010, her second studio album O sebe was released. In 2012, Gagarina started to collaborate with Russian-Georgian producer Konstantin Meladze. With Meladze she recorded four singles: "Spektakl okonchen" ("The Play Is Over"), "Net" ("No"), "Navek" ("Forever") and "Shagay" ("Stride").

=== 2015–16: Eurovision Song Contest and 9 ===
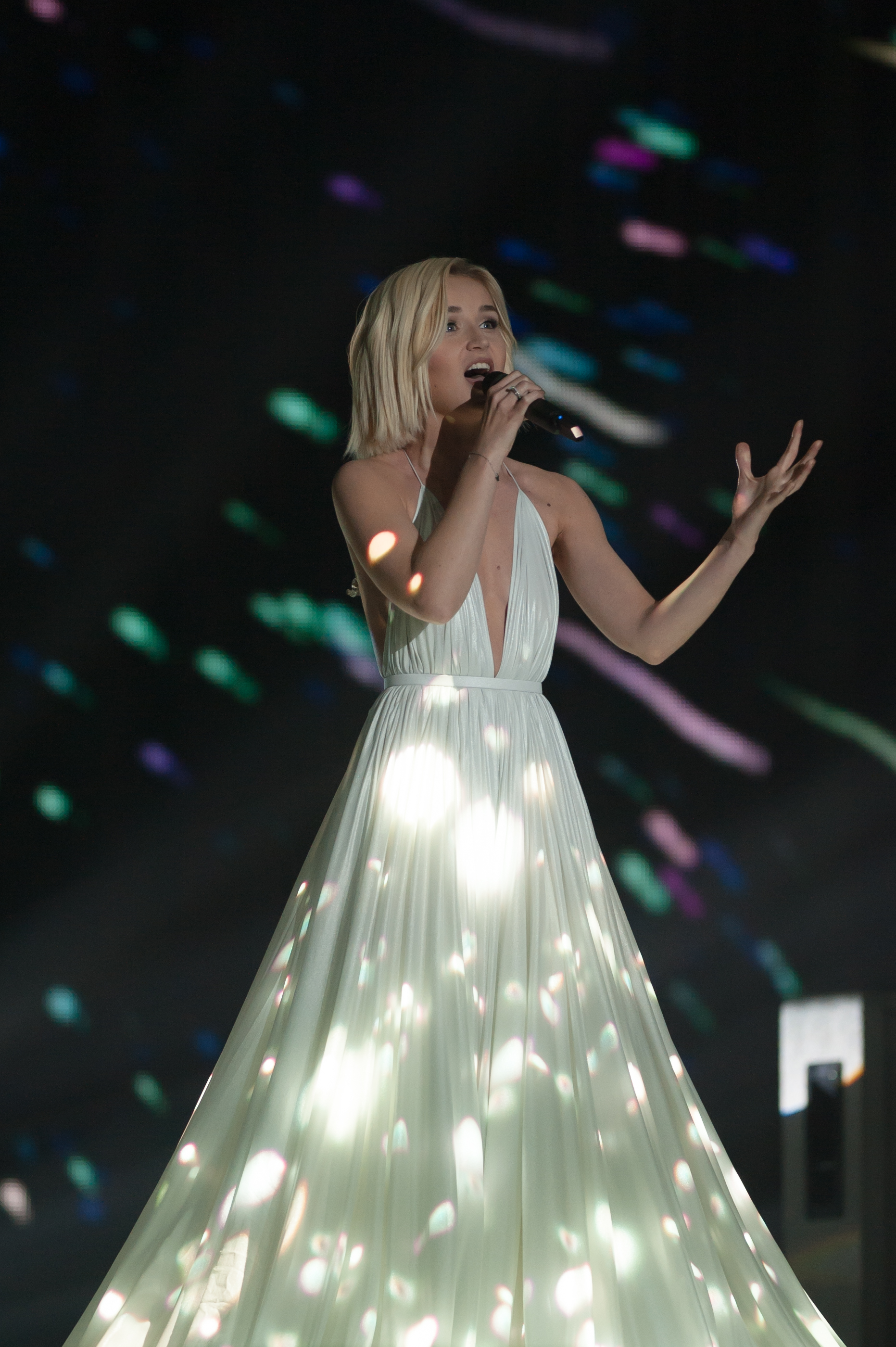
Gagarina at ESC 2015

On 9 March 2015, it was revealed that Gagarina would represent Russia in the Eurovision Song Contest 2015 with the song "A Million Voices". Gagarina placed first in the first semi-final with 182 points, before coming second in the Grand Final of the contest, ending up with 303 points. This was the fourth highest overall points total of all time and she became the first non-winning participant to exceed 300 points. On 25 July 2015, she performed "A Million Voices" as the closing song of the 2018 FIFA World Cup qualifying draw in Saint Petersburg, shown on television worldwide. On 9 August 2015, she performed at the closing ceremony of the 2015 World Aquatics Championships in Kazan. She was a coach in the Russian reality talent show The Voice in seasons four and five. In September 2016, her third studio album 9 was released. This album peaked at number one on the Russia iTunes charts.

=== 2019–present: Singer 2019 ===
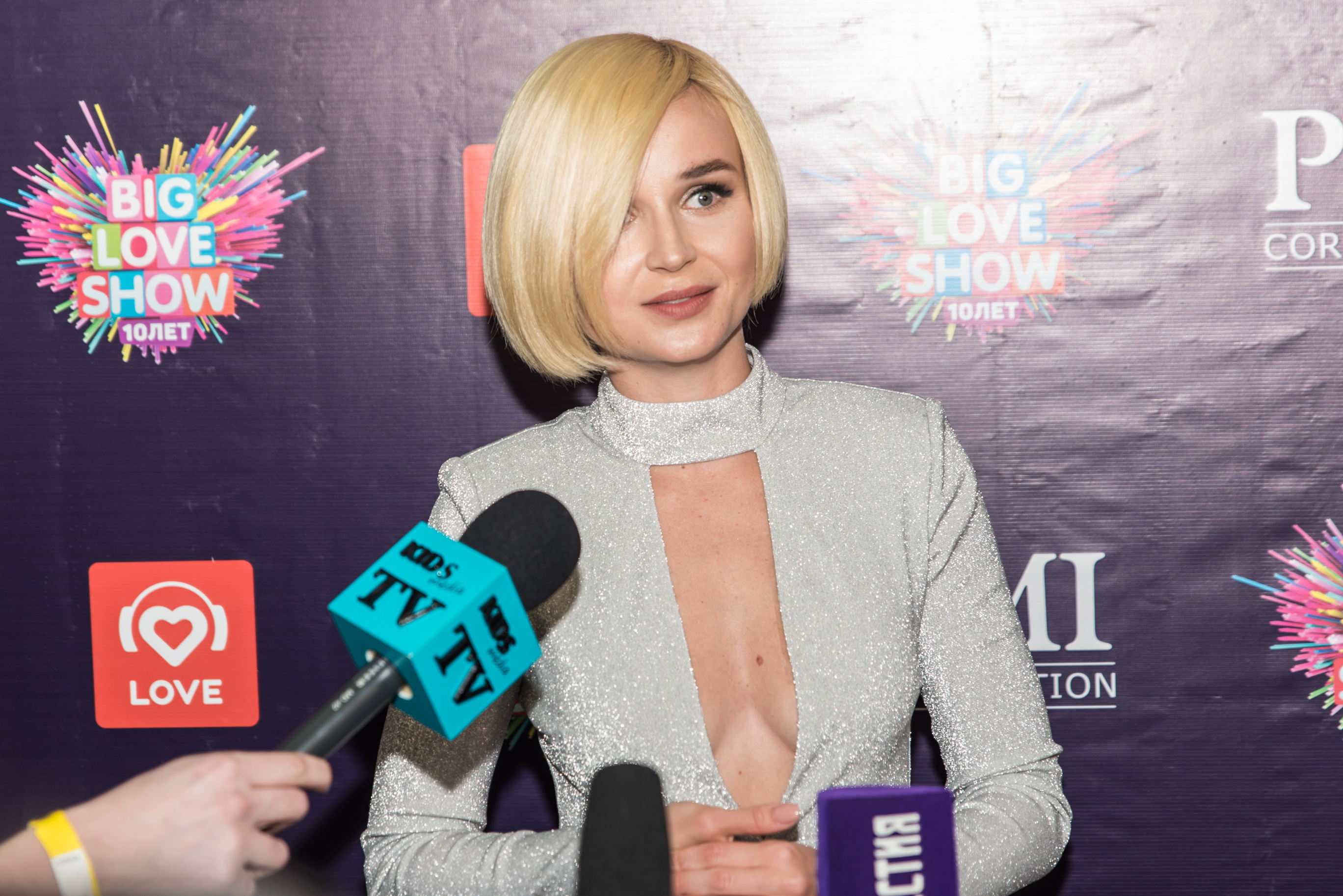
Gagarina in Saint Petersburg, 2018

On 1 February 2019, it was revealed that Gagarina participated in Chinese' reality competition Singer 2019, also known as the seventh season of I Am a Singer, entering under the substitute singer status on the fourth week. Gagarina was the third European contestant to participate after season six's winner Jessie J (United Kingdom) and Kristian Kostov (Bulgaria), who participated in season seven alongside her. Gagarina achieved three top placements on the first five-week of shows before finishing last in her sixth show, which was the Challenge round; Gagarina would have been eliminated per the competition rules but was instead saved after the Challenger of the week was unsuccessful in beating a majority (4) of the seven singers.

On 22 March, she was temporarily given a bye after reporting to the media that she sustained a muscle injury during rehearsals. Despite her injury, she eventually ranked in the top three during the following week's round, called the Breakout round (a round featured previously eliminated contestants, substitute singers, except withdrawn and non-competing singers), where she became one of the seven finalists eligible for the title of Singer 2019 winner. In the Finals Rush Hour, she performed a duet with Chinese singer Geng Sihan, singing the song "Shallow". In the first round of the final, she sang "We Are the World" alongside Kazakhstan's Junior Eurovision Song Contest 2018 participant Daneliya Tuleshova, Filipino-Canadian singer Darren Espanto and Chinese rapper Air Ari. She was, however, was knocked out that round.

Singer 2019 performances and results
Episode	Song	Original Singer	Percentage	Rank	Result
Round 2 Qualifier	"Кукушка"	Kino	20.395%	1st	Joined as a substitute singer. Got 2nd place, with 18.10% combined
Round 2 Knockout	"Katyusha"	Soviet Song	15.810%	2nd	Joined as a substitute singer. Got 2nd place, with 18.10% combined
Round 2 Challenge	"A Million Voices"	Polina Gagarina	19.395%	1st	Safe
Round 3 Qualifier	"Hurt"	Christina Aguilera	10.695%	6th	Safe (3rd overall, with 15.732% combined)
Round 3 Knockout	"Спектакль окончен"	Polina Gagarina	20.770%	1st	Safe (3rd overall, with 15.732% combined)
Round 3 Challenge	"Lake Baikal"	Li Jian	8.750%	7th	Would have been eliminated for finishing last; but a challenger failed the challenge and was eliminated instead.
Round 4 Qualifier	"Forbidden Love"	Polina Gagarina		3rd	
Breakout	"Cтороною дождь" / "Колыбельная"	Russian Folk Song / Polina Gagarina	21.93%	2nd	Safe
Finals Rush Hour	"Shallow"	Lady Gaga, Bradley Cooper	N/A (Guest performance)		
Grand Final Round 1	"We Are the World"	USA for Africa	Eliminated		

In 2019, Gaganira rejoined The Voice as a coach for its eighth season. Also, for the first time on The Voice Kids, she was a coach for its seventh season. Gagarina's final team member won the ninth season making her the first female coach to win a season in The Voice history.

In 2021, she teamed up with fellow Eurovision 2015 contestant Måns Zelmerlöw to record the official song, "Circles and Squares", for the 2021 World Figure Skating Championships. It was released on 21 February 2021.

On 18 March 2022, Gagarina sang at a pro-government rally held at the Luzhniki Stadium in Moscow celebrating the eighth anniversary of the annexation of Crimea by the Russian Federation from Ukraine and endorsing Russia's invasion of Ukraine that started the previous month. She was subsequently banned from entering Estonia and Latvia, along with a list of 24 other Russian artists who had expressed their support for the Russian government's actions. Her concert, scheduled in February 2023 in Almaty, Kazakhstan, was cancelled after online protest in Kazakhstan over her support of Russian's war against Ukraine. The Presidential Administration of Russia put Gagarina on the list of singers who were recommended to be invited to state-sponsored events.

In 2023, after taking the tenth season of The Voice off, Gagarina returned for its eleventh season and became the first female coach on the show to win multiple times. Also, she was offered by the general director Konstantin Ernst and the producers of the film to audition for the main role in the film "The Challenge" to go into space.

== Social and political activities ==
In 2018, registered as a proxy for Vladimir Putin, during the 2018 presidential election, she was part of the Putin Team movement that advocated for him.

In 2018, she was a proxy for Moscow mayoral candidate Sergey Sobyanin.

Since 2018, she has been a member of the Presidential Council for Culture and Art.

Gagarina publicly supports Russia's invasion of Ukraine. On March 18, 2022, she performed in Luzhniki at a rally-concert in honor of the anniversary of the annexation of Crimea under the title "Za world without Nazism! Za Russia! Za President!".

In 2023, she was a member of the initiative group to nominate Vladimir Putin as a candidate for the presidential election in 2024.

== Sanctions ==
In March 2022, Latvia and Estonia banned Gagarina from entry for supporting the Russian invasion of Ukraine.

On 7 January 2023, amid Russia's invasion of Ukraine, for "supporting Russian occupiers and Russia's brutal war against Ukraine", she was placed on Ukraine's sanctions lists, which imply blocking of assets, complete cessation of commercial operations, and halting fulfillment of economic and financial obligations. In November 2022, her concerts in Kazakhstan were canceled due to her support of Russia's invasion of Ukraine.

On 3 February 2023, Gagarina was placed on Canada's sanctions list as being involved in the dissemination of Russian disinformation and propaganda. Earlier, Gagarina was included by FBK in the list of corrupt and warmongers, with a proposal to impose international sanctions against her because of her participation in concerts in support of the war against Ukraine.

In late June 2024, Gagarina was included in a European Union sanction package along with other Russian artists who support the war. Following this, Spotify removed the songs and profiles of those artists, while YouTube blocked their channels in early July. Gagarina's work was removed from both platforms.

== Personal life ==
On 25 August 2007, Gagarina married Russian actor Pyotr Kislov. She gave birth to their son on 14 October 2007. They divorced on 31 March 2010.

She married photographer Dmitry Iskhakov on 9 September 2014. She gave birth to their daughter in April 2017. They split in 2021.

== Discography ==
- Poprosi u oblakov (2007)
- O sebe (2010)
- 9 (2016)
- Vdoch (2022)

== Filmography ==
Year	Title	Role
2007	Дочки-матери ("Mother and daughter")	Performed title song
2012	Катина любовь ("Katina love")	Performed title song
2012	Hotel Transylvania	Mavis (Russian dub)
2013	Саша Белый ("Sasha Bely")	Herself
2014	Legends of Oz: Dorothy's Return	Dorothy Gale (Russian dub)
2015	Одной левой ("Only with the left hand")	Sofi
2015	Hotel Transylvania 2	Mavis (Russian dub)
2015	Battle for Sevastopol	Performed main theme
2016	The Good Boy	Performed end song
2017	Richard the Stork	Olga (Russian dub)
2017	My Little Pony: The Movie	Storm (Russian dub)
2018	Duck Duck Goose	Lily (Russian dub)
2018	Hotel Transylvania 3: Summer Vacation	Mavis (Russian dub)
2018	Заповедник ("Nature reserve")	Herself

== See also ==
- Russia in the Eurovision Song Contest 2015

Awards and achievements
Preceded by Korni	Star Factory (Russia) winner 2003	Succeeded by Nikita Malinin
Preceded by Tolmachevy Sisters with "Shine"	Russia in the Eurovision Song Contest; 2015	Succeeded by Sergey Lazarev with "You Are the Only One"
