= Buranovo, Russia =

Buranovo (Russian: Бураново) is the name of several rural localities in Russia:

- Buranovo, Kalmansky District, Altai Krai, a selo in Buranovsky Selsoviet of Kalmansky District of Altai Krai
- Buranovo, Togulsky District, Altai Krai, a selo in Antipinsky Selsoviet of Togulsky District of Altai Krai
- Buranovo, Ust-Kalmansky District, Altai Krai, a selo in Kabanovsky Selsoviet of Ust-Kalmansky District of Altai Krai
- Buranovo, Novosibirsk Oblast, a selo in Cherepanovsky District of Novosibirsk Oblast
- Buranovo, Udmurt Republic, a selo in Buranovsky Selsoviet of Malopurginsky District of the Udmurt Republic
