= Kolonkovo =

Kolonkovo Колонково
- Selo
- Location within Altai Krai Location within Russia
- Coordinates: 53°19′N 85°52′E
- Country: Russia
- Region: Altai Krai
- District: Togulsky District
- Time zone: UTC+7:00

Kolonkovo (Russian: Колонково) is a rural locality (a selo) in Antipinsky Selsoviet, Togulsky District, Altai Krai, Russia. The population was 234 as of 2013. There are 3 streets.

== Geography ==
Kolonkovo is located on the Chumysh River, 17 km south of Togul (the district's administrative centre) by road. Antipino is the nearest rural locality.
