= Antipino =

Antipino Антипино
- Selo
- Location within Altai Krai Location within Russia
- Coordinates: 53°17′N 85°50′E
- Country: Russia
- Region: Altai Krai
- District: Togulsky District
- Time zone: UTC+7:00

Antipino (Russian: Антипино) is a rural locality (a selo) and the administrative center of Antipinsky Selsoviet, Togulsky District, Altai Krai, Russia. The population was 1,412 as of 2013. There are 12 streets.

== Geography ==
Antipino is located on the Chumysh River, 37 km south of Togul (the district's administrative centre) by road. Kolochkovo is the nearest rural locality.
