= Verkh-Koptelka =

Verkh-Koptelka Верх-Коптелка
- Selo
- Location within Altai Krai Location within Russia
- Coordinates: 53°28′N 86°11′E
- Country: Russia
- Region: Altai Krai
- District: Togulsky District
- Time zone: UTC+7:00

Verkh-Koptelka (Russian: Верх-Коптелка) is a rural locality (a selo) in Starotogulsky Selsoviet, Togulsky District, Altai Krai, Russia. The population was 66 as of 2013. There are 8 streets.

== Geography ==
Verkh-Koptelka is located 27 km east of Togul (the district's administrative centre) by road. Uksunay is the nearest rural locality.
