= Lnozavod =

Lnozavod (Russian: Льнозаво́д, lit. flax factory) is the name of several rural localities in Russia.

== Modern localities ==
- Lnozavod, Altai Krai, a settlement in Togulsky Selsoviet of Togulsky District in Altai Krai; 53°27′N 85°57′E
- Lnozavod, Kaluga Oblast, a selo in Iznoskovsky District of Kaluga Oblast
- Lnozavod, Kiknursky District, Kirov Oblast, a settlement in Russko-Krainsky Rural Okrug of Kiknursky District in Kirov Oblast; 57°22′N 46°48′E
- Lnozavod, Luzsky District, Kirov Oblast, a village in Papulovsky Rural Okrug of Luzsky District in Kirov Oblast; 60°36′N 47°56′E
- Lnozavod, Shabalinsky District, Kirov Oblast, a settlement in Chernovsky Rural Okrug of Shabalinsky District in Kirov Oblast; 58°41′N 47°23′E
- Lnozavod, Mari El Republic, a settlement in Chuksolinsky Rural Okrug of Novotoryalsky District in the Mari El Republic; 57°2′N 48°44′E
- Lnozavod, Omsk Oblast, a settlement in Kurgansky Rural Okrug of Muromtsevsky District in Omsk Oblast
- Lnozavod, Dukhovshchinsky District, Smolensk Oblast, a settlement under the administrative jurisdiction of Dukhovshchinskoye Urban Settlement in Dukhovshchinsky District of Smolensk Oblast
- Lnozavod, Muryginskoye Rural Settlement, Pochinkovsky District, Smolensk Oblast, a village in Muryginskoye Rural Settlement of Pochinkovsky District in Smolensk Oblast
- Lnozavod, Shatalovskoye Rural Settlement, Pochinkovsky District, Smolensk Oblast, a village in Shatalovskoye Rural Settlement of Pochinkovsky District in Smolensk Oblast
- Lnozavod, Stodolishchenskoye Rural Settlement, Pochinkovsky District, Smolensk Oblast, a village in Stodolishchenskoye Rural Settlement of Pochinkovsky District in Smolensk Oblast
- Lnozavod, Ugransky District, Smolensk Oblast, a village in Veshkovskoye Rural Settlement of Ugransky District in Smolensk Oblast
- Lnozavod, Vologda Oblast, a settlement in Minkovsky Selsoviet of Babushkinsky District in Vologda Oblast

== Alternative names ==
- Lnozavod, alternative name of Borovskoy, a settlement in Shangskoye Settlement of Sharyinsky District in Kostroma Oblast; 58°29′N 45°38′E
- Lnozavod, alternative name of Lnozavoda, a settlement in Soligalichskoye Settlement of Soligalichsky District in Kostroma Oblast; 59°5′N 42°15′E
- Lnozavod, alternative name of Mirny, a settlement in Sudislavskoye Settlement of Sudislavsky District in Kostroma Oblast; 57°54′N 41°39′E
