= Bujor =

Bujor may refer to:

== Given name ==
- Bujor Hălmăgeanu (1941–2018), Romanian retired association football defender and manager
- Bujor Hoinic (born 1950), Romanian pianist, conductor, conservatory professor and opera composer
- Bujor Nedelcovici (born 1936), Romanian novelist, essayist, playwright and screenwriter

== Surname ==
- Flavia Bujor (born 1988), French novelist of Romanian origin
- Gabriel Bujor (born 1990), Romanian handball player
- Leonid Bujor (born 1955, Moldovan politician
- Loredana Bujor (born 1972), Romanian retired tennis player
- Metodie Bujor (born 1974), Moldovan classically trained baritone and Russian singer
- Mihail Gheorghiu Bujor (1881–1964), Romanian politician
- Paul Bujor (1862–1952), Romanian zoologist, writer and politician
- Vlad Bujor (born 1989), Romanian footballer

== Places ==
=== Romania ===
- Bujor, a village in Vârvoru de Jos Commune, Dolj County
- Bujor, a village in Miheșu de Câmpie Commune, Mureș County
- Bujorul, a tributary of the Chineja in Galați County
- Târgu Bujor, a town in Galați County
- Traian Vuia, Timiș, a town known as Bujor until 1950

=== Moldova ===
- Bujor, Hînceşti, a commune in Raionul Hînceşti
