= Toptushka =

Toptushka Топтушка
- Village
- Location within Altai Krai Location within Russia
- Coordinates: 53°22′N 86°05′E
- Country: Russia
- Region: Altai Krai
- District: Togulsky District
- Time zone: UTC+7:00

Toptushka (Russian: Топтушка) is a rural locality (a selo) and the administrative center of Toptushensky Selsoviet of Togulsky District, Altai Krai, Russia. The population was 186 in 2016. There are 6 streets.

== Geography ==
Toptushka is located 25 km southeast of Togul (the district's administrative centre) by road. Stary Togul is the nearest rural locality.

== Ethnicity ==
The village is inhabited by Russians.
