= Stary Togul =

Stary Togul Старый Тогул
- Selo
- Location within Altai Krai Location within Russia
- Coordinates: 53°25′N 85°54′E
- Country: Russia
- Region: Altai Krai
- District: Togulsky District
- Time zone: UTC+7:00

Stary Togul (Russian: Старый Тогул) is a rural locality (a selo) and the administrative center of Starotogulsky Selsoviet, Togulsky District, Altai Krai, Russia. The population was 1,026 as of 2013. There are 16 streets.

== Geography ==
Stary Togul is located 5 km south of Togul (the district's administrative centre) by road. Togul is the nearest rural locality.
