= Titovo =

Titovo Титово
- Selo
- Location within Altai Krai Location within Russia
- Coordinates: 53°24′N 85°45′E
- Country: Russia
- Region: Altai Krai
- District: Togulsky District
- Time zone: UTC+7:00

Titovo (Russian: Титово) is a rural locality (a selo) in Togulsky Selsoviet, Togulsky District, Altai Krai, Russia. The population was 129 as of 2013. There are 4 streets.

== Geography ==
Titovo is located 16 km southwest of Togul (the district's administrative centre) by road. Buranovo is the nearest rural locality.
