= The Voice (Russian TV series) season 1 =

The Voice
- Season 1
- Presented by: Dmitry Nagiev
- Coaches: Dima Bilan; Pelageya; Alexander Gradsky; Leonid Agutin
- Winner: Dina Garipova
- Winning coach: Alexander Gradsky
- Runner-up: Elmira Kalimullina

Release
- Original network: Channel One
- Original release: 5 October – 29 December 2012

Season chronology
- Next → Season 2

The first season of the Russian TV show The Voice premiered on October 5, 2012, on Channel One. Dmitry Nagiev became the show's presenter. Dima Bilan, Pelageya, Alexander Gradsky and Leonid Agutin became the coach's in the premiere season.

Dina Garipova was announced the winner on December 29, 2012, marking Alexander Gradsky's first win as a coach.

== Coaches and presenter ==
The Voice season 1 coaching panel and presenter

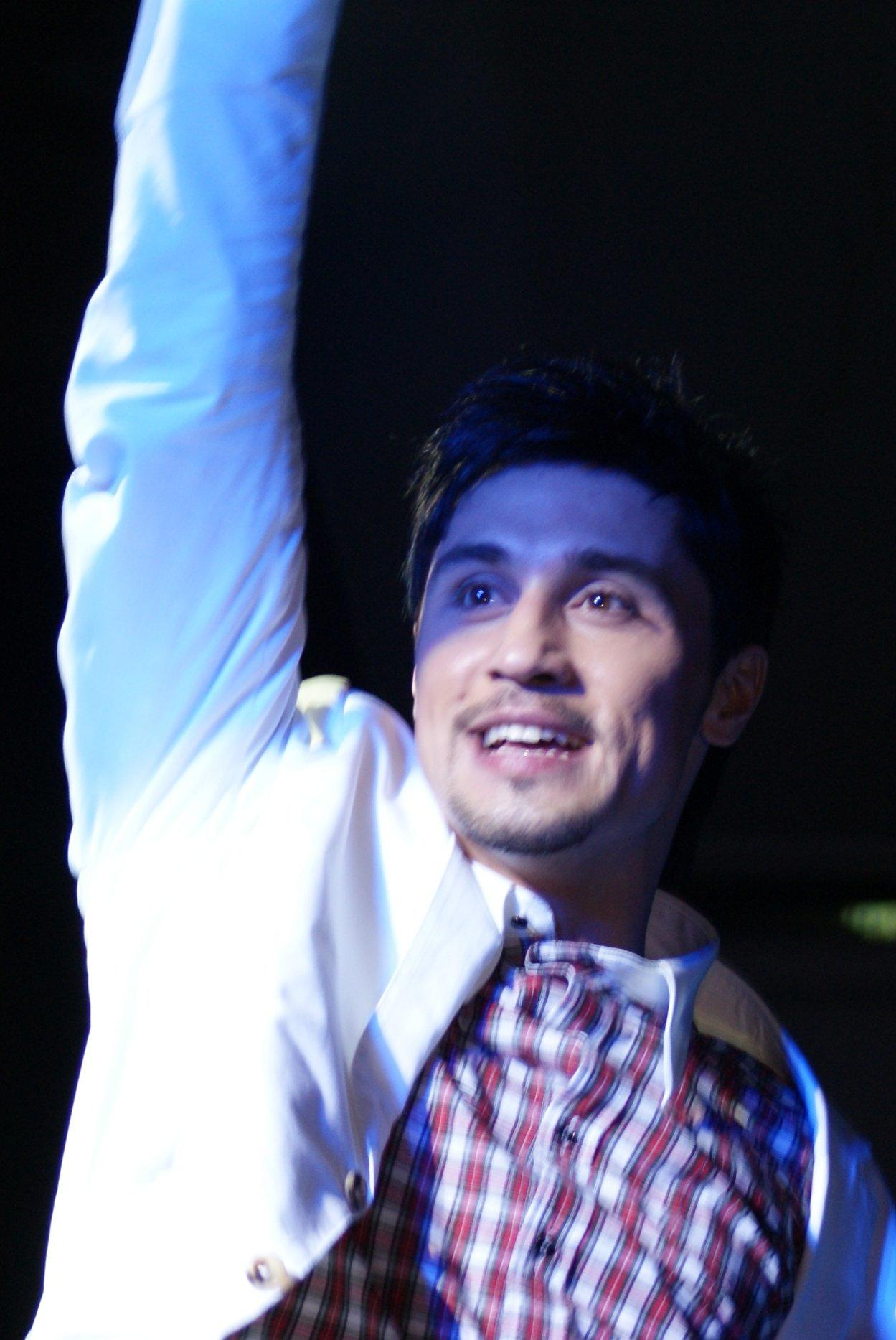
Dima Bilan

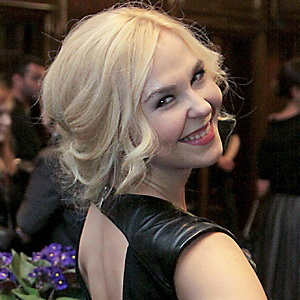
Pelageya

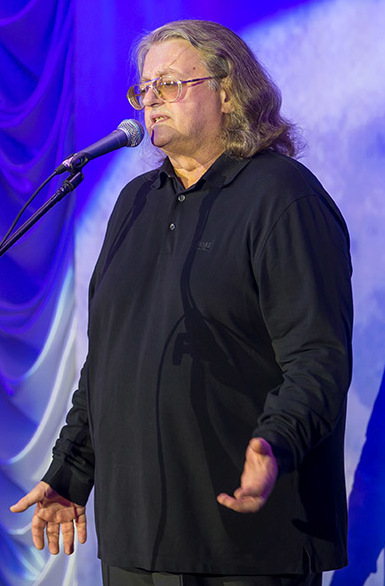
Alexander Gradsky

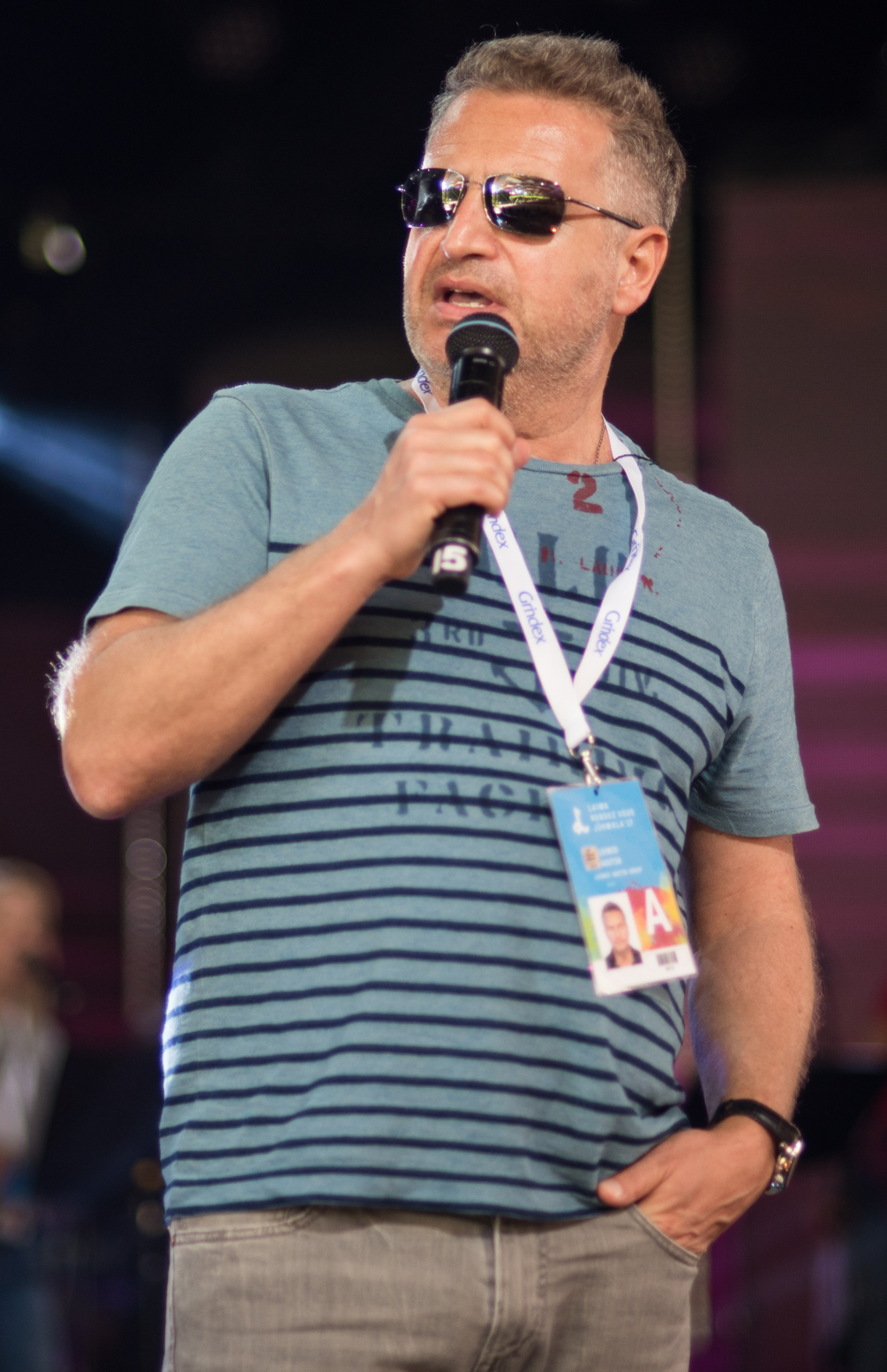
Leonid Agutin

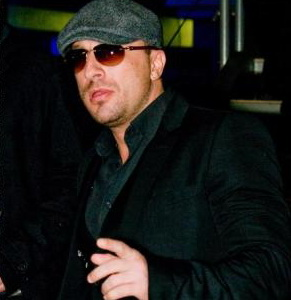
Dmitry Nagiev

== Teams ==
Colour key

- Winner
- Runner-up
- Third place
- Fourth place
- Eliminated in the Semifinal
- Eliminated in the Quarterfinal
- Eliminated in the Knockout rounds
- Eliminated in the Battle rounds

Coaches	Top 48 artists					
Dima Bilan	Margarita Pozoyan	Olga Klyain	Yuliya Tereshchenko	Anastasiya Kashnikova	Alex Malinovsky	Anastasiya Chevazhevskaya
Dima Bilan	Natalya Terekhova	Kseniya Gerasimova	Valeriya Akhatova	Alina Bashkina	Anzhelika Frolova & Viktoriya Kuzmina	Artyom Demishev
Pelageya	Elmira Kalimullina	Mariya Goya	Anri Gogniashvili	Roman Vtyurin	Achi Purtseladze	Nikita Pozdnyakov
Pelageya	Gayana Zakharova	Anna Zolotova	Mari Karne	Diana Garifullina	Oksana Petrova	Juliana Strangelove
Alexander Gradsky	Dina Garipova	Evgeny Kungurov	Polina Zizak	Ilya Yudichev	Pavel Pushkin	Svetlana Saydieva
Alexander Gradsky	Valeriya Grinyuk	Metodie Bujor	Darya Dubovitskaya	Pavel Tarasov	Artur Vasilyev	Soslan Kulumbekov
Leonid Agutin	Anastasiya Spiridonova	Edvard Khacharyan	Artyom Kacharyan	Ideliya Mukhametzyanova	Alexander Pozdnyakov	Sevara Nazarkhan
Leonid Agutin	Zlat Khabibullin	Vlad Chuprov	Alisa Geliss	Liya Sarkisyan	Alexandra Bartashevich	Sofya Avazashvili

== Blind auditions ==
Color key

✔	Coach hit his/her "I WANT YOU" button
	Artist defaulted to this coach's team
	Artist elected to join this coach's team
	Artist eliminated with no coach pressing his or her "I WANT YOU" button

The coaches performed "Let it be" at the start of the show.

Episode	Order	Artist	Age	Origin	Song	Coach's and artist's choices			
Episode	Order	Artist	Age	Origin	Song	Bilan	Pelageya	Gradsky	Agutin
Episode 1 (October 5, 2012)	1	Yuliya Tereshchenko	22	Moscow	"Мир без любимого"	✔	—	—	✔
Episode 1 (October 5, 2012)	2	Vyacheslav Olhovsky	50	Grozny	"Я люблю тебя до слёз"	—	—	—	—
Episode 1 (October 5, 2012)	3	Anna Zolotova	20	Samara	"Aria of Delilah"	✔	✔	✔	✔
Episode 1 (October 5, 2012)	4	Mark Yusim	24	Glazov, Udmurtia	"This Love"	—	—	—	—
Episode 1 (October 5, 2012)	5	Kseniya Gerasimova	19	Ivanovo	"Валенки"	✔	—	—	—
Episode 1 (October 5, 2012)	6	Edvard Khacharyan	28	Sochi, Krasnodar Krai	"Historia de un Amor"	✔	✔	✔	✔
Episode 1 (October 5, 2012)	7	Veronika Glebova	23	Omsk	"Чудесная страна"	—	—	—	—
Episode 1 (October 5, 2012)	8	Mariya Goya	24	Kyiv, Ukraine	"Simply the Best"	—	✔	—	—
Episode 1 (October 5, 2012)	9	Polina Zizak	19	Moscow	"At Last"	—	—	✔	—
Episode 1 (October 5, 2012)	10	Gleb Matveychuk	31	Moscow	"До свидания, мама!"	—	—	—	—
Episode 1 (October 5, 2012)	11	Alexandra Bartashevich	23	Brest, Belarus	"I Feel Good"	✔	✔	—	✔
Episode 1 (October 5, 2012)	12	Roman Vtyurin	23	Nizhny Novgorod	"Скажите, девушки"	—	✔	—	—
Episode 2 (October 12, 2012)	1	Evgeny Kungurov	29	Moscow	"Разговор со счастьем"	—	—	✔	—
Episode 2 (October 12, 2012)	2	Olga Klyain	25	Ekaterinburg	"I Believe I Can Fly"	✔	—	✔	✔
Episode 2 (October 12, 2012)	3	Pavel Tarasov	39	Nizhny Novgorod	"Беловежская пуща"	✔	—	✔	—
Episode 2 (October 12, 2012)	4	Marina Matveeva	26	Moscow	"My All"	—	—	—	—
Episode 2 (October 12, 2012)	5	Anri Gogniashvili	21	Tbilisi, Georgia	"You Can Leave Your Hat On"	✔	✔	—	—
Episode 2 (October 12, 2012)	6	Alina Bashkina	19	Donetsk, Ukraine	"Эхо любви"	✔	—	—	—
Episode 2 (October 12, 2012)	7	Elena Orkina	25	Rostov-on-Don	"Milord"	—	—	—	—
Episode 2 (October 12, 2012)	8	Vlada Chuprova	26	Saint Petersburg	"Mercy"	✔	✔	—	✔
Episode 2 (October 12, 2012)	9	Konstantin Shustarev	47	Sestroretsk, Saint Petersburg	"Вьюга"	—	—	—	—
Episode 2 (October 12, 2012)	10	Dina Garifullina	19	Ufa	"Strong Enough"	✔	✔	✔	—
Episode 2 (October 12, 2012)	11	Andrey Maksimov	17	Saint Petersburg	"Луч солнца золотого"	—	—	—	—
Episode 2 (October 12, 2012)	12	Mari Karne	21	Moscow	"Summertime"	✔	✔	—	—
Episode 3 (October 19, 2012)	1	Anastasiya Spiridonova	27	Velikie Luki, Pskov Oblast	"Simply the Best"	✔	—	✔	✔
Episode 3 (October 19, 2012)	2	Filipp Cherevko	26	Noyabrsk, YaNAO	"Парень чернокожий"	—	—	—	—
Episode 3 (October 19, 2012)	3	Sevara Nazarkhan	35	Tashkent, Uzbekistan	"Je t'aime"	✔	✔	—	✔
Episode 3 (October 19, 2012)	4	Artyom Kacharyan	23	Vladikavkaz	"Hello"	—	—	—	✔
Episode 3 (October 19, 2012)	5	Darya Letichevskaya	23	Moscow	"Останусь"	—	—	—	—
Episode 3 (October 19, 2012)	6	Oleg Mitrinyuk	32	Kostroma	"Я вижу свет"	—	—	—	—
Episode 3 (October 19, 2012)	7	Svetlana Saydieva	28	Tashkent, Uzbekistan	"I Will Always Love You"	✔	—	✔	—
Episode 3 (October 19, 2012)	8	Anastasiya Kashnikova	35	Moscow	"Мир без любимого"	✔	—	—	—
Episode 3 (October 19, 2012)	9	Artyom Demishev	26	Moscow	"Feeling Good"	✔	✔	✔	✔
Episode 3 (October 19, 2012)	10	Elmira Kalimullina	24	Kazan	"Колыбельная"	—	✔	—	—
Episode 3 (October 19, 2012)	11	Renata Baykova	25	Ufa	"At Last"	—	—	—	—
Episode 3 (October 19, 2012)	12	Artur Vasilyev	25	Saint Petersburg	"Con te partirò"	—	—	✔	—
Episode 4 (October 26, 2012)
Episode 4 (October 26, 2012)	1	Fyodor Rytikov	49	Zelenograd, Moscow	"Скажите, девушки"	—	—	—	—
Episode 4 (October 26, 2012)	2	Margarita Pozoyan	27	Moscow	"I Will Always Love You"	✔	—	✔	✔
Episode 4 (October 26, 2012)	3	Kristina Konovalova	23	Moscow	"Симона"	—	—	—	—
Episode 4 (October 26, 2012)	4	Soslan Kulumbekov	35	Tskhinvali, Georgia	"Historia de un Amor"	—	—	✔	—
Episode 4 (October 26, 2012)	5	Oksana Mukhina	32	Tyrnyauz, Kabardino-Balkaria	"Woman in Love"	—	—	—	—
Episode 4 (October 26, 2012)	6	Dina Garipova	21	Zelenodolsk, Tatarstan	"А напоследок я скажу"	—	—	✔	—
Episode 4 (October 26, 2012)	7	Oksana Petrova	28	Magadan	"Я ― то, что надо"	✔	✔	—	—
Episode 4 (October 26, 2012)	8	Achi Purtseladze	33	Tbilisi, Georgia	"Summertime"	—	✔	—	✔
Episode 4 (October 26, 2012)	9	Anna-Nika Vakar	18	Beltsy, Moldova	"Улетаю"	—	—	—	—
Episode 4 (October 26, 2012)	10	Sofya Avazashvili	23	Cheboksary	"Domino"	—	—	—	✔
Episode 4 (October 26, 2012)	11	Ilya Yudichev	37	Moscow	"Caruso"	—	—	✔	—
Episode 4 (October 26, 2012)	12	Ideliya Mukhametzyanova	21	Ulyanovsk	"Let It Be"	✔	✔	✔	✔
Episode 5 (November 4, 2012)	1	Alexander Pozdnyakov	19	Moscow	"You Can Leave Your Hat On"	✔	✔	—	✔
Episode 5 (November 4, 2012)	2	Nikita Pozdnyakov	27	Moscow	"Unchain My Heart"	—	✔	—	—
Episode 5 (November 4, 2012)	3	Olga Kovaleva	20	Ekaterinburg	"Чудесная страна"	—	—	—	—
Episode 5 (November 4, 2012)	4	Natalya Terekhova	26	Tula	"My All"	✔	—	—	—
Episode 5 (November 4, 2012)	5	Valeriya Grinyuk	22	Tashkent, Uzbekistan	"Останусь"	—	—	✔	—
Episode 5 (November 4, 2012)	6	Vitaly Milushev	26	Krymsk, Krasnodar Krai	"Актриса"	—	—	—	—
Episode 5 (November 4, 2012)	7	Veronika Shramko	19	Krasnodar	"Domino"	—	—	—	—
Episode 5 (November 4, 2012)	8	Pavel Pushkin	38	Vladivostok	"Aria of Delilah from the opera "Samson and Delilah"	✔	✔	✔	—
Episode 5 (November 4, 2012)	9	Gayana Zakharova	20	Krasnodar	"Колыбельная"	—	✔	—	—
Episode 5 (November 4, 2012)	10	Ilya Pichko	18	Shakhty, Rostov Oblast	"Это здорово"	—	—	—	—
Episode 5 (November 4, 2012)	11	Liya Sarkisyan	18	Fedoskino, Moscow Oblast	"At Last"	—	—	—	✔
Episode 5 (November 4, 2012)	12	Anzhelika Frolova & Viktoriya Kuzmina (Sugarmammas)	N/A	Surgut, Yugra / Moscow	"Simply the Best"	✔	✔	✔	✔
Episode 6 (November 9, 2012)	1	Zlat Khabibullin	26	Ufa	"I Feel Good"	✔	✔	✔	✔
Episode 6 (November 9, 2012)	2	Ekaterina Pechkurova	25	Saint Petersburg	"Любовь настала"	—	—	—	—
Episode 6 (November 9, 2012)	3	Darya Dubovitskaya	25	Moscow	"I Will Always Love You"	—	—	✔	—
Episode 6 (November 9, 2012)	4	Lev Elgardt	29	Tver	"Я ― то, что надо"	—	—	—	—
Episode 6 (November 9, 2012)	5	Valeriya Akhatova	26	Nadym, YaNAO	"Domino"	✔	—	—	—
Episode 6 (November 9, 2012)	6	Alex Malinovsky	26	Magadan	"Беловежская пуща"	✔	—	—	—
Episode 6 (November 9, 2012)	7	Anastasiya Ivan	23	Kyiv, Ukraine	"Je t'aime"	—	—	—	—
Episode 6 (November 9, 2012)	8	Anastasiya Chevazhevskaya	24	Moscow	"Мир без любимого"	✔	—	✔	✔
Episode 6 (November 9, 2012)	9	Alexey Ismailov	24	Novosibirsk	"Sorry Seems to Be the Hardest Word"	Team full	—	—	—
Episode 6 (November 9, 2012)	10	Alisa Geliss	20	Kaliningrad	"This Love"	Team full	—	—	✔
Episode 6 (November 9, 2012)	11	Metodie Bujor	38	Saint Petersburg	"Dicitencello vuie"	Team full	—	✔	Team full
Episode 6 (November 9, 2012)	12	Juliana Strangelove	27	Moscow	"You Can Leave Your Hat On"	Team full	✔	Team full	Team full

== The Battles ==
The Battles round started with episode 7 and ended with episode 9. Contestants who win their battle would advance to the Knockout rounds.

Colour key

Artist won the Battle and advanced to the Knockouts
Artist lost the Battle and was eliminated

Episode	Coach	Order	Winner	Song	Loser
Episode 7 (November 16, 2012)	Leonid Agutin	1	Anastasiya Spiridonova	"Бросай"	Zlat Khabibullin
Episode 7 (November 16, 2012)	Alexander Gradsky	2	Polina Zizak	"Proud Mary"	Darya Dubovitskaya
Episode 7 (November 16, 2012)	Pelageya	3	Achi Purtseladze	"Мой друг"	Oksana Petrova
Episode 7 (November 16, 2012)	Dima Bilan	4	Anastasiya Chevazhevskaya	"Vivo per lei"	Artyom Demishev
Episode 7 (November 16, 2012)	Leonid Agutin	5	Alexander Pozdnyakov	"Crazy"	Alexandra Bartashevich
Episode 7 (November 16, 2012)	Alexander Gradsky	6	Ilya Yudichev	"O sole mio"	Pavel Tarasov
Episode 7 (November 16, 2012)	Dima Bilan	7	Olga Klyain	"Ain't Nobody"	Valeriya Akhatova
Episode 7 (November 16, 2012)	Pelageya	8	Mariya Goya	"The Diva Dance"	Anna Zolotova
Episode 8 (November 23, 2012)	Pelageya	1	Nikita Pozdnyakov	"Moscow Calling"	Juliana Strangelove
Episode 8 (November 23, 2012)	Alexander Gradsky	2	Dina Garipova	"When You Believe"	Valeriya Grinyuk
Episode 8 (November 23, 2012)	Leonid Agutin	3	Edvard Khacharyan	"Я тебя люблю"	Vlada Chuprova
Episode 8 (November 23, 2012)	Dima Bilan	4	Margarita Pozoyan	"I'm Every Woman"	Natalya Terekhova
Episode 8 (November 23, 2012)	Pelageya	5	Roman Vtyurin	"Я тебя никогда не забуду"	Dina Garifullina
Episode 8 (November 23, 2012)	Leonid Agutin	6	Artyom Kacharyan	"Georgia on My Mind"	Alisa Geliss
Episode 8 (November 23, 2012)	Dima Bilan	7	Anastasiya Kashnikova	"Кому? Зачем?"	Alina Bashkina
Episode 8 (November 23, 2012)	Alexander Gradsky	8	Pavel Pushkin	"Con te partiro"	Artur Vasilyev
Episode 9 (November 30, 2012)	Alexander Gradsky	1	Evgeny Kungurov	"Синяя вечность"	Metodie Bujor
Episode 9 (November 30, 2012)	Pelageya	2	Anri Gogniashvili	"Без бою"	Mari Karne
Episode 9 (November 30, 2012)	Leonid Agutin	3	Ideliya Mukhametzyanova	"Blame It on the Boogie"	Liya Sarkisyan
Episode 9 (November 30, 2012)	Dima Bilan	4	Yuliya Tereshchenko	"Бумажный змей"	Kseniya Gerasimova
Episode 9 (November 30, 2012)	Alexander Gradsky	5	Svetlana Saydieva	"L'Italiano"	Soslan Kulumbekov
Episode 9 (November 30, 2012)	Pelageya	6	Elmira Kalimullina	"Lady Marmalade"	Gayana Zakharova
Episode 9 (November 30, 2012)	Dima Bilan	7	Alex Malinovsky	"Whenever I Say Your Name"	Anzhelika Frolova & Viktoriya Kuzmina
Episode 9 (November 30, 2012)	Leonid Agutin	8	Sevara Nazarkhan	"Run to You"	Sofya Avazashvili

== The Knockouts ==
The Knockouts round was broadcast on 7 December 2012. The top 12 contestants moved on to the Quarterfinal.

Colour key

Artist won the Knockout and advanced to the Quarterfinal
Artist lost the Knockout and was eliminated

Episode	Coach	Order	Song	Artists		Song
Episode	Coach	Order	Song	Winner	Loser	Song
Episode 10 (December 7, 2012)	Leonid Agutin	1	"Hurt"	Anastasiya Spiridonova	Ideliya Mukhametzyanova	"Cabaret"
Episode 10 (December 7, 2012)	Dima Bilan	2	"Остров любви"	Margarita Pozoyan	Anastasiya Kashnikova	"Улетай на крыльях ветра"
Episode 10 (December 7, 2012)	Alexander Gradsky	3	"Angel"	Dina Garipova	Ilya Yudichev	"Who Wants to Live Forever"
Episode 10 (December 7, 2012)	Pelageya	4	"Habanera"	Elmira Kalimullina	Roman Vtyurin	"Влюблённый солдат"
Episode 10 (December 7, 2012)	Pelageya	5	"Trouble"	Mariya Goya	Achi Purtseladze	"I Just Called to Say I Love You"
Episode 10 (December 7, 2012)	Leonid Agutin	6	"Мелодия"	Edvard Khacharyan	Alexander Pozdnyakov	"Романс"
Episode 10 (December 7, 2012)	Dima Bilan	7	"Блюз"	Yuliya Tereshchenko	Anastasiya Chevazhevskaya	"All the Man That I Need"
Episode 10 (December 7, 2012)	Alexander Gradsky	8	"My Way"	Evgeny Kungurov	Pavel Pushkin	"Песенка волшебника"
Episode 10 (December 7, 2012)	Dima Bilan	9	"Crazy in Love"	Olga Klyain	Alex Malinovskiy	"Breathe Easy"
Episode 10 (December 7, 2012)	Pelageya	10	"Wicked Game"	Anri Gogniashvili	Nikita Pozdnyakov	"Колыбельная"
Episode 10 (December 7, 2012)	Alexander Gradsky	11	"The Power of Love"	Polina Zizak	Svetlana Saydieva	"The Voice Within"
Episode 10 (December 7, 2012)	Leonid Agutin	12	"If I Ain't Got You"	Artyom Kacharyan	Sevara Nazarkhan	"Там нет меня"

== Live shows ==
Colour key:

Artist was saved by Public's vote
Artist was saved by his/her coach
Artist was eliminated

=== Week 1: Quarterfinal ===
The one artist with the fewest votes from the each team left the competition by the end of the night.

Episode	Coach	Order	Artist	Song	Result
Episode 11 (December 14, 2012)	Leonid Agutin	1	Artyom Kacharyan	"Песня о далекой родине"	Eliminated
Episode 11 (December 14, 2012)	Leonid Agutin	2	Anastasiya Spiridonova	"I'm Outta Love"	Saved by Public's vote
Episode 11 (December 14, 2012)	Leonid Agutin	3	Edvard Khacharyan	"Delilah"	Saved by Coach
Episode 11 (December 14, 2012)	Pelageya	4	Mariya Goya	"Ой не світи, місяченьку"	Saved by Coach
Episode 11 (December 14, 2012)	Pelageya	5	Elmira Kalimullina	"Is It a Crime"	Saved by Public's vote
Episode 11 (December 14, 2012)	Pelageya	6	Anri Gogniashvili	"Я хочу быть с тобой"	Eliminated
Episode 11 (December 14, 2012)	Dima Bilan	7	Olga Klyain	"It Don't Mean a Thing"	Saved by Coach
Episode 11 (December 14, 2012)	Dima Bilan	8	Yuliya Tereshchenko	"Stand Up for Love"	Eliminated
Episode 11 (December 14, 2012)	Dima Bilan	9	Margarita Pozoyan	"I Have Nothing"	Saved by Public's vote
Episode 11 (December 14, 2012)	Alexander Gradsky	10	Dina Garipova	"Ты на свете есть"	Saved by Public's vote
Episode 11 (December 14, 2012)	Alexander Gradsky	11	Polina Zizak	"And I'm Telling You"	Eliminated
Episode 11 (December 14, 2012)	Alexander Gradsky	12	Evgeny Kungurov	"Ноктюрн"	Saved by Coach

Non-competition performances
Order	Performer	Song
11.1	Leonid Agutin, Anastasiya Spiridonova, Edvard Khacharyan and Artyom Kacharyan)	"Аэропорты"
11.2	Pelageya, Elmira Kalimullina, Mariya Goya and Anri Gogniashvili	"Под ракитою"
11.3	Dima Bilan, Margarita Pozoyan, Olga Klyain and Yuliya Tereshchenko	"Believe"
11.4	Alexander Gradsky, Dina Garipova, Evgeny Kungurov and Polina Zizak	"Hey Jude"

=== Week 2: Semifinal ===
The one artist with the fewest votes from the each team left the competition.

Episode	Coach	Order	Artist	Song	Coach's vote (/100%)	Public's vote (/100%)	Votes' sum	Result
Episode 12 (December 21, 2012)	Alexander Gradsky	1	Evgeny Kungurov	"Есть только миг"	40%	29%	69%	Eliminated
Episode 12 (December 21, 2012)	Alexander Gradsky	2	Dina Garipova	"The Music of the Night"	60%	71%	131%	Advanced
Episode 12 (December 21, 2012)	Leonid Agutin	3	Edvard Khacharyan	"The Show Must Go On"	40%	46%	86%	Eliminated
Episode 12 (December 21, 2012)	Leonid Agutin	4	Anastasiya Spiridonova	"All by Myself"	60%	54%	114%	Advanced
Episode 12 (December 21, 2012)	Pelageya	5	Elmira Kalimullina	"В горнице"	60%	65%	125%	Advanced
Episode 12 (December 21, 2012)	Pelageya	6	Mariya Goya	"It's My Life"	40%	35%	75%	Eliminated
Episode 12 (December 21, 2012)	Dima Bilan	7	Margarita Pozoyan	"Rolling in the Deep"	60%	49%	109%	Advanced
Episode 12 (December 21, 2012)	Dima Bilan	8	Olga Klyain	"Колыбельная"	40%	51%	91%	Eliminated

Non-competition performances
Order	Performer	Song
12.1	Iosif Kobzon, Dina Garipova and Evgeny Kungurov	"Надежда"
12.2	Alexey Chumakov, Anastasiya Spiridonova and Edvard Khacharyan	"Загадай"
12.3	Chaif, Elmira Kalimullina and Mariya Goya	"Я рисую на окне"
12.4	Polina Gagarina, Margarita Pozoyan and Olga Klyain	"Спектакль окончен"

=== Week 3: Final ===
The Top 4 performed on December 29, 2012. The artist with the highest percentage of votes will be declared as the winner.

Episode	Coach	Artist	Order	Duet Song (with Star)	Order	Solo Song	Order	Duet Song (with Coach)	Result	
Episode 13 (December 29, 2012)
Episode 13 (December 29, 2012)	Dima Bilan	Margarita Pozoyan	1	"Ещё люблю" (with A-Studio)	5	"Не надо слов"	Eliminated		Fourth place	
Episode 13 (December 29, 2012)	Pelageya	Elmira Kalimullina	2	"Где ты?" (with Sergey Mazaev)	6	"Adagio"	9	"Cancao do mar"	Second place	33.7%
Episode 13 (December 29, 2012)	Alexander Gradsky	Dina Garipova	3	"Skyfall" (with Fantine Pritula and Igor Butman)	7	"Non, je ne regrette rien"	10	"Не отрекаются любя"	Winner	66.3%
Episode 13 (December 29, 2012)	Leonid Agutin	Anastasiya Spiridonova	4	"Я тебе не верю" (with Grigory Leps)	8	"Любовь и одиночество"	11	"На сиреневый луне"	Third place	

Non-competition performances
Order	Performer	Song
13.1	Margarita Pozoyan, Elmira Kalimullina, Dina Garipova and Anastasiya Spiridonova	"С Новым Годом!"
13.2	Dima Bilan and Margarita Pozoyan	"Caruso"
13.3	All artists of the season	"Happy New Year"

== Reception ==
=== Rating ===
Episode		Original airdate	Production	Time slot (UTC+3)	Audience	
Episode		Original airdate	Production	Time slot (UTC+3)	Rating	Share
1	"The Blind Auditions Premiere"	October 5, 2012	101	Friday 9:30 p.m.	5.5	16.2
2	"The Blind Auditions, Part 2"	October 12, 2012	102	Friday 9:30 p.m.	6.9	20.0
3	"The Blind Auditions, Part 3"	October 19, 2012	103	Friday 9:30 p.m.	7.0	20.0
4	"The Blind Auditions, Part 4"	October 26, 2012	104	Friday 9:30 p.m.	7.8	22.3
5	"The Blind Auditions, Part 5"	November 4, 2012	105	Sunday 9:20 p.m.	8.8	24.1
6	"The Blind Auditions, Part 6"	November 9, 2012	106	Friday 9:30 p.m.	8.4	23.1
7	"The Battles Premiere"	November 16, 2012	107	Friday 9:30 p.m.	8.0	22.4
8	"The Battles, Part 2"	November 23, 2012	108	Friday 9:30 p.m.	8.4	23.2
9	"The Battles, Part 3"	November 30, 2012	109	Friday 9:30 p.m.	7.7	21.2
10	"The Knockouts"	December 7, 2012	110	Friday 7:50 p.m.	7.4	21.5
11	"Live Quarterfinal"	December 14, 2012	111	Friday 9:30 p.m.	7.7	24.0
12	"Live Semifinal"	December 21, 2012	112	Friday 9:30 p.m.	9.2	25.3
13	"Live Season Final"	December 29, 2012	113	Saturday 9:30 p.m.	7.7	22.3
