= Novoiushino =

Novoiushino Новоиушино
- Village
- Location within Altai Krai Location within Russia
- Coordinates: 53°37′N 85°49′E
- Country: Russia
- Region: Altai Krai
- District: Togulsky District
- Time zone: UTC+7:00

Novoiushino (Russian: Новоиушино) is a rural locality (a selo) and the administrative center of Novoiushinsky Selsoviet of Togulsky District, Altai Krai, Russia. The population was 357 in 2016. There are 12 streets. Novoiushino is located 23 km north of Togul (the district's administrative centre) by road. Novokhmelyovka is the nearest rural locality.
