= Dina Garipova =

Russian singer (born 1991)

Dina Garipova Дина Гарипова
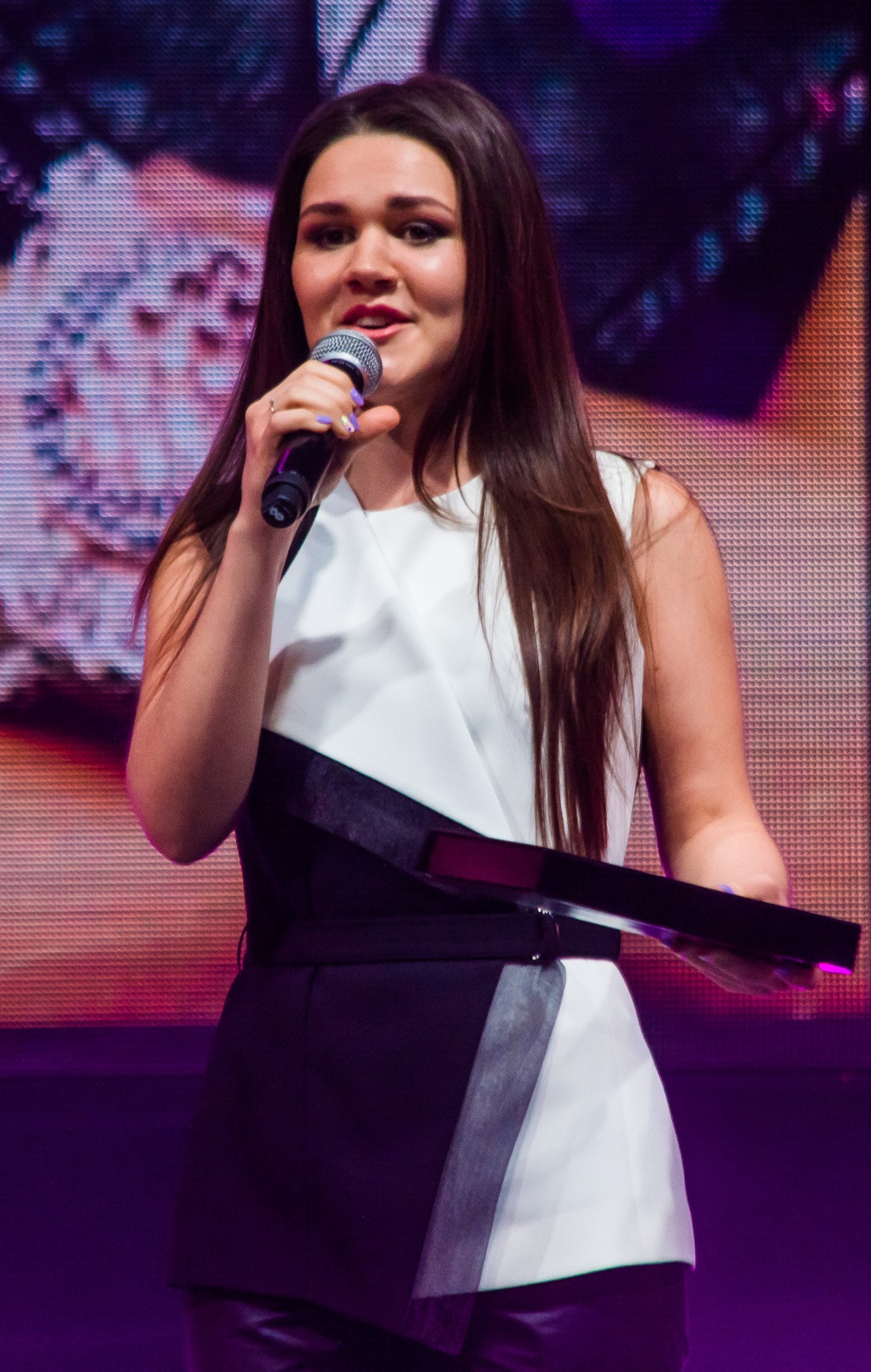
- Garipova in 2017

Background information
- Born: 25 March 1991 (age 35); Zelenodolsk, Tatar ASSR, Russian SFSR, Soviet Union
- Genres: Pop
- Years active: 1999–present
- Website: dinagaripova.ru

Garipova presenting herself at the Eurovision Song Contest 2013.

Dina Fagimovna Garipova (Russian: Дина Фагимовна Гарипова, Tatar: Динә Фәһим кызы Гарипова, romanized: Dinä Fähim kyzy Garipova; born 25 March 1991) is a Russian singer. In 2012, Garipova won the Russian version of singing competition The Voice, Golos. Garipova was selected by the Russian broadcaster Channel One to represent Russia at the Eurovision Song Contest 2013 in Malmö, Sweden, with the song "What If". At the competition, she qualified from the first semi-final and placed fifth in the final, scoring 174 points. In 2015, Garipova was one of five jurors for Russia in the Eurovision Song Contest 2015.

== Biography ==
Garipova was born on 25 March 1991, in Zelenodolsk, Tatarstan, Russia, to a family of physicians. From the age of six, Garipova studied singing at the "Zolotoy mikrofon" (Golden Microphone) Theatre, with Elena Antonova as her vocal coach. Garipova studied journalism (correspondence department) at the Kazan (Volga region) Federal University. When Garipova graduated from "Zolotoy mikrofon", she toured with the Tatarstan singer Gabdelfat Safin.

Dina's vocal range is 2.4 octaves.

Dina is of ethnic Tatar descent and is Sunni Muslim.

=== The Voice ===
Dina auditioned in 2012 to compete in season 1 of The Voice. In the blind auditions, broadcast on 26 October 2012 on Channel One, she sang "А напоследок я скажу". Only Alexander Gradsky turned his chair for her at the last few seconds of the performance.

The Voice performances

| Stage | Song | Original artist | Date | Order | Result |
|---|---|---|---|---|---|
| Blind Audition | "А напоследок я скажу" | Valentina Ponomaryova | 29 October 2012 | 4.6 | Only Alexander Gradsky turned for her. |
| Battle Rounds (Top 48) | "When You Believe" (vs. Valeria Grinyuk) | Whitney Houston and Mariah Carey | 23 November 2012 | 8.2 | Saved by Coach |
| Knockout Rounds (Top 24) | "Angel" (vs. Ilya Yudichev) | Aretha Franklin | 7 December 2012 | 10.3 | Saved by Coach |
| Live Quarterfinal (Top 12) | "Ты на свете есть" | Alla Pugacheva | 14 December 2012 | 11.10 | Saved by Public's vote |
| Live Semifinal (Top 8) | "The Music of the Night" | Michael Crawford | 21 December 2012 | 12.2 | Saved by Votes' summa |
| Live Final (Top 4) | "Skyfall" (with Igor Butman) | Adele | 29 December 2012 | 13.3 | Winner |
| Live Final (Top 4) | "Non, je ne regrette rien" | Edith Piaf | 29 December 2012 | 13.7 | Winner |
| Live Final (Top 4) | "Не отрекаются любя" | Alla Pugacheva | 29 December 2012 | 13.10 | Winner |

Non competition performances
| Order | Collaborator(s) | Song | Original Artist |
|---|---|---|---|
| 11.4 | Alexander Gradsky, Evgeniy Kungurov, and Polina Zizak | "Hey Jude" | The Beatles |
| 12.1 | Joseph Kobzon and Evgeniy Kungurov | "Надежда" | Joseph Kobzon |
| 13.1 | Margarita Pozoyan, Elmira Kalimullina, and Anastasia Spiridonova | "С Новым Годом!" | - |
| 13.3 | Top 48 artists of the season | "Happy New Year" | ABBA |

== Discography ==
=== Studio albums ===
| Title | Details |
|---|---|
| Два шага до любви (Two Steps to Love) | Released: 28 October 2014; Label: Universal Music Russia; Format: CD, digital download |

=== Singles ===
| Title | Year | Peak chart positions | | | | Album |
| Title | Year | GER | NL | SWI | UK | Album |
|---|---|---|---|---|---|---|
| "What If" | 2013 | 78 | 51 | 75 | 161 | Два шага до любви |

Awards and achievements
| Preceded by contest started | Winner of Golos; 2012 | Succeeded by Sergei Volchkov |
| Preceded by Buranovskiye Babushki with "Party for Everybody" | Russia in the Eurovision Song Contest; 2013 | Succeeded by Tolmachevy Sisters with "Shine" |
