= Shumikha =

Shumikha (Russian: Шумиха) is the name of several inhabited localities in Russia.

Urban localities

- Shumikha, Kurgan Oblast, a town in Shumikhinsky District of Kurgan Oblast

Rural localities

- Shumikha, Altai Krai, a selo in Togulsky Selsoviet of Togulsky District of Altai Krai
- Shumikha, Irkutsk Oblast, a settlement in Slyudyansky District of Irkutsk Oblast
- Shumikha, Krasnoyarsk Krai, a village in Kucherdayevsky Selsoviet of Ilansky District of Krasnoyarsk Krai
- Shumikha, Novosibirsk Oblast, a village in Bolotninsky District of Novosibirsk Oblast
- Shumikha, Karagaysky District, Perm Krai, a settlement in Karagaysky District, Perm Krai
- Shumikha, Nytvensky District, Perm Krai, a village in Nytvensky District, Perm Krai
- Shumikha, Pskov Oblast, a village in Bezhanitsky District of Pskov Oblast
- Shumikha, Sverdlovsk Oblast, a village in Prigorodny District of Sverdlovsk Oblast
