= Buranovskiye Babushki =

Russian ethno-pop band

Buranovskiye Babushki Бурановские бабушки
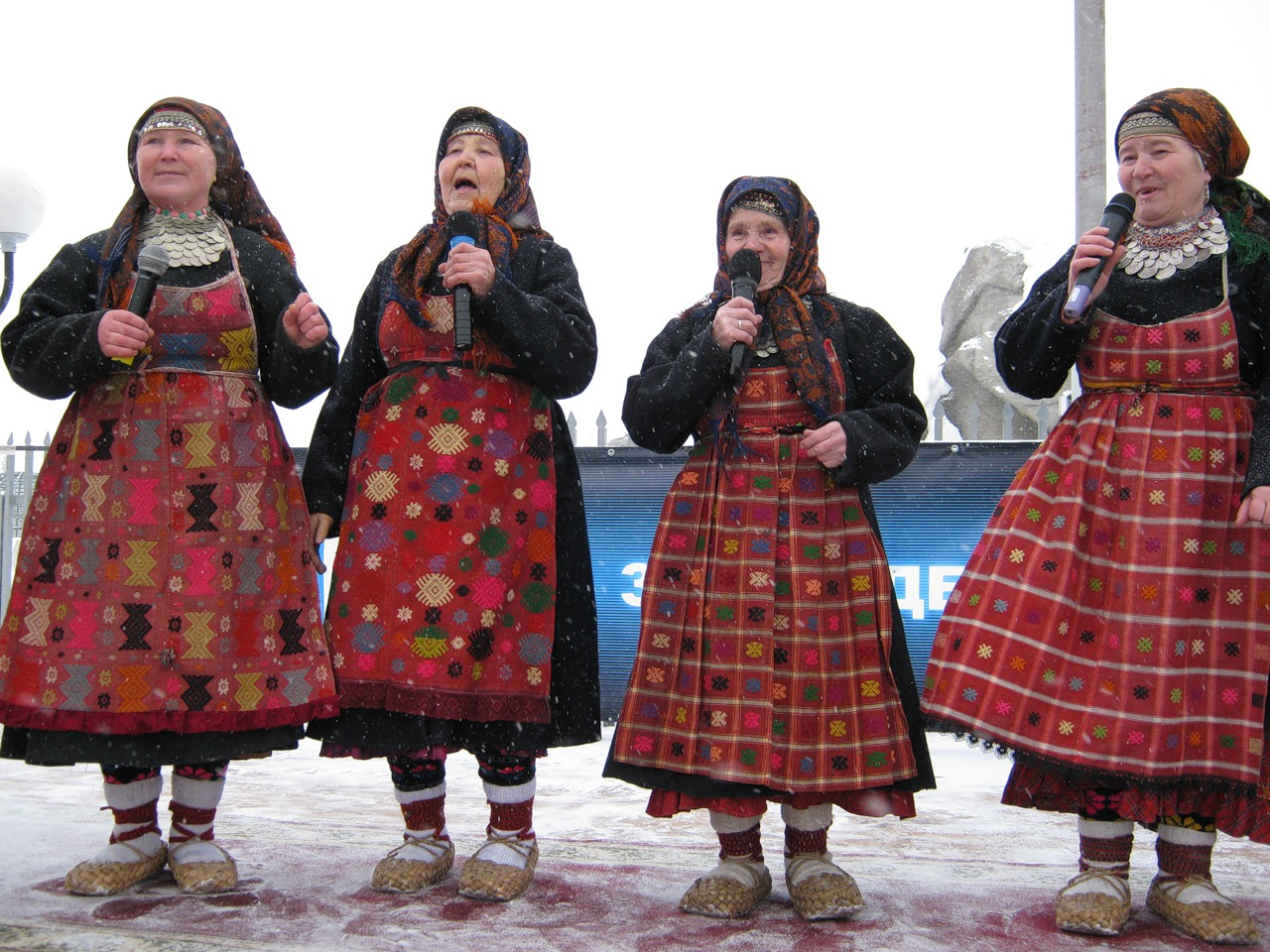
- Buranovskiye Babushki in 2011

Background information
- Origin: Buranovo, Udmurtia, Russia
- Genres: Pop; ethno
- Years active: 1970–present
- Members: Anna Prokopyeva; Valentina Serebrennikova; Yekaterina Antonova
- Past members: Yelizaveta Filippovna Zarbatova; Granya Ivanovna Baysarova; Alevtina Gennadyevna Begisheva; Zoya Sergeyevna Dorodova; Galina Nikolayevna Koneva; Valentina Semyonovna Pyatchenko; Olga Nikolayevna Tuktareva; Yekaterina Semyonovna Shklyayeva; Natalya Yakovlevna Pugachyova
- Website: buranovskiebabushki.ru

Buranovskiye Babushki (Russian: Бурановские бабушки, pronounced [bʊˈranəfskʲɪ(j)ɪ ˈbabʊʂkʲɪ]; Udmurt: Брангуртысь песянайёс, romanized: Brangurtyś pesänajos; both meaning "Buranovo Grannies") is an Udmurt-Russian ethno-pop band comprising eight elderly women from the village of Buranovo, Udmurtia. Buranovskiye Babushki represented Russia at the Eurovision Song Contest 2012 in Baku, Azerbaijan, where they finished second.

== History ==
=== Eurovision Song Contest ===
The group had previously participated on Russia's Eurovision song selection in 2010 with the song "Dlinnaja-dlinnaja beresta i kak sdelat' iz nee ajšon" ('Very long birch bark and how to turn it into a turban'), where they finished third.

They made another attempt to represent Russia by participating on Russia's Eurovision song selection in 2012 with the song "Party for Everybody", which was sung partially in English. The group eventually won, receiving 38.51 points ahead of Eurovision 2008 winner Dima Bilan who also entered the contest with T.A.T.u. member Yulia Volkova with the song "Back to Her Future", which finished second, receiving 29.25 points. They represented Russia in the Eurovision Song Contest 2012 in Baku, Azerbaijan. The group finished in 2nd place with 259 points, receiving points from 40 countries out of eligible 41 (excluding Switzerland), and were behind the winning country, Sweden, who scored 372 points.

=== Fundraising for church rebuilding ===
In 2010, the group started a fund for the rebuilding of Trinity Church in Buranovo and all of the group's income is donated into this fund. The Trinity Church was originally built, of stone, in 1865, but was closed on 19 September 1939 by the Soviet administration and demolished. The present wooden church was in poor condition. The church was opened and consecrated on 20 June 2016.

=== Post-Eurovision era ===
In 2018, to promote 2018 FIFA World Cup, Buranovskiye Babushki released a new song "Ole-ola".

== Members ==
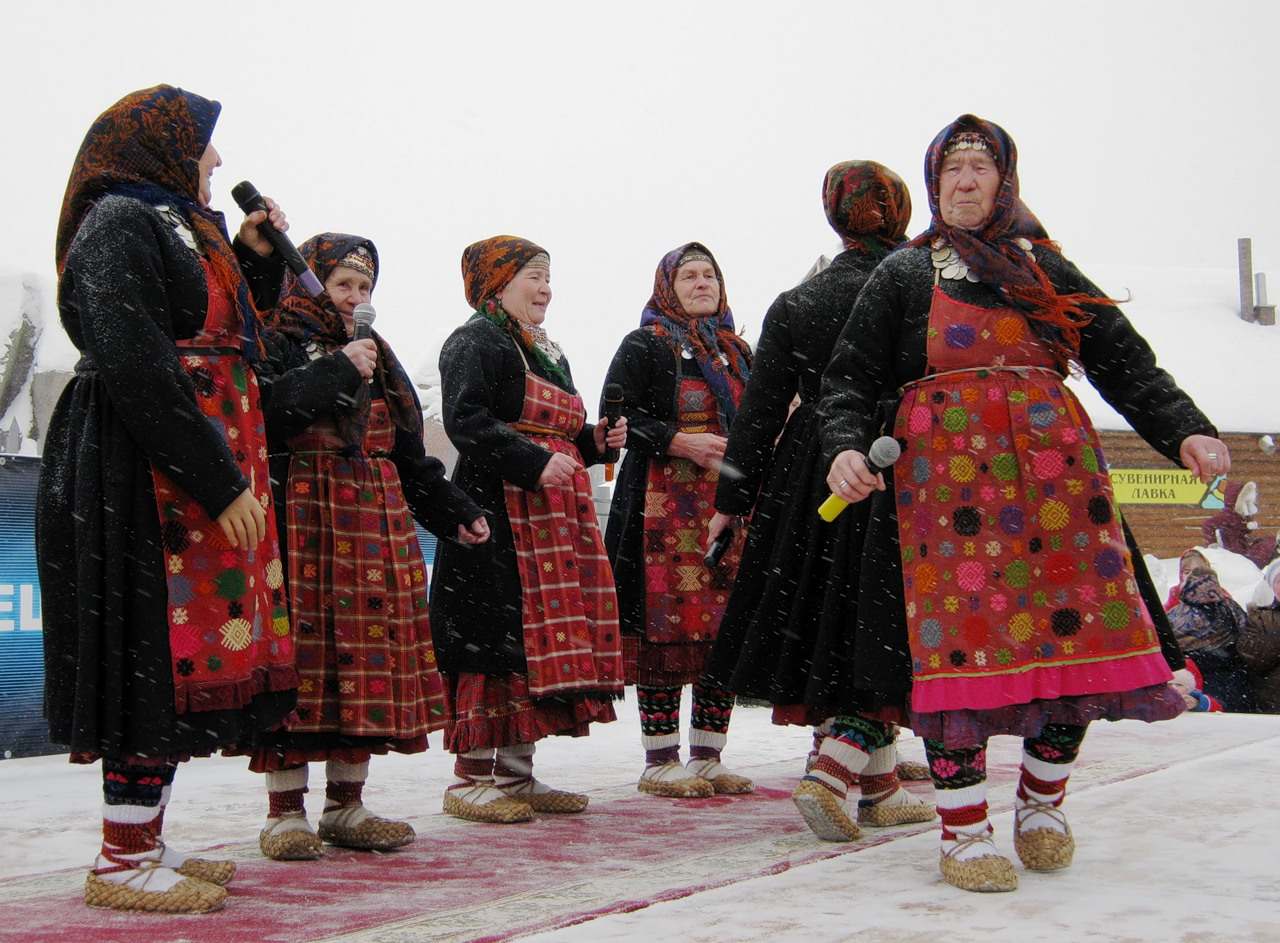
Buranovskiye Babushki touring in 2011

In 2014, Producer Ksenia Rubtsova ended the contract with the original grandmothers and recruited a new line-up of 8 primary grandmothers, including Anna Prokopyeva and Valentina Serebrennikova, and 12 back-up grandmothers. The new grandmothers are from a variety of villages in Udmurtia. The former grandmothers continue to perform under the name "Бабушки из Бураново" (Grandmothers from Buranovo).

- Grania Baysarova (born 1949)
- Alevtina Begisheva (born 1958)
- Valentina Pyatchenko (born 1937)
- Olga Tuktareva (born 1968)
- Nikolay Zarbatov (born 1963 or 1964)

=== Former ===
- Elizaveta Zarbatova (1926–2014)
- Natalya Pugacheva (1935–2019)
- Galina Koneva (born 1938)
- Ekaterina Shklyaeva (1937–2024)
- Zoya Dorodova (1940–2026)

== Critical reception ==
Russian critics noted that the success of Buranovskiye Babushki at the 2012 Eurovision Song Contest was influenced by Russian acts like Ivan Kupala.

Awards and achievements
Preceded by Alexey Vorobyov with "Get You"	Russia in the Eurovision Song Contest; 2012	Succeeded by Dina Garipova with "What If"
