= Buranovo =

Buranovo may refer to:

- Buranovo, Bulgaria, a place in Kocherinovo municipality of Kyustendil Province, Bulgaria
- Buranovo, Russia, several rural localities in Russia
