= Yuri Artamonov =

Russian serial killer and robber

- Born: Yuri Ivanovich Artamonov; 17 April 1975; Kechevo, Udmurt ASSR, RSFSR
- Other names: "The Izhevsk Raskolnikov" "The Plumber with an Axe" "Moydodyr"
- Conviction: Murder x5
- Penalty: Death; commuted to 25 years imprisonment, later to 22 years and 10 months

Details
- Victims: 5
- Span of crimes: 1995–1997
- Country: Russia
- State: Udmurtia
- Date apprehended: 7 March 1997

Yuri Ivanovich Artamonov (Russian: Юрий Иванович Артамонов; born 17 April 1975), known as the Izhevsk Raskolnikov (Russian: Ижевский Раскольников, romanized: Izhevskiy Raskolnikov), is a Russian serial killer and robber who murdered five people in the city of Izhevsk, Udmurtia, from 1995 to 1997. Initially sentenced to death, his sentence was later commuted to 25 years imprisonment, and he was released in 2017.

== Early life ==
Yuri Ivanovich Artamonov was born in 1975 in the village of Kechevo, Udmurt ASSR, into a poor family with many children. He grew up without a father and was physically abused by his strict and cruel mother. During his school years, Artamonov had no interest in studying and constantly got mediocre grades. After graduating from high school, he enrolled in a rural vocational school, where he studied to be a tractor driver.

In 1993, he was drafted to serve in the Russian Army and was stationed in the Far East. Upon his return, he moved in with his wife and parents in the Oktyabrsky District of Izhevsk, where the couple soon had a daughter. During this period, Artamonov began to experience financial difficulties and had trouble finding a job, which prompted him to turn to crime. He soon bought a hatchet, work clothes, and cotton gloves, as well as a revolver he got from the black market. He then stored all these items in a hiding place not far from his house.

== Murders ==
As his modus operandi, Artamonov operated only during the winter, where he could wear his overalls and pretend to be a plumber who needed to "check" the heating systems of elderly people. At a convenient moment, he would strike the victim several times on the head with an axe and then take everything valuable from the dwelling. Artamonov would then give the stolen items and jewellery to his wife and mother-in-law and spend the money on himself and his family. His main area of operation was in the neighbourhoods of Mayskaya Street and 10 Years of October.

His first murder took place on 25 October 1995. Having read in a newspaper that Irina Mezhueva, a 36-year-old resident of the Ustinovsky District, wanted to buy a car, he called the phone number listed in the ad and learned her address. On the next day, disguised as a plumber, Artamonov went to her home and was invited inside. He asked Mezhueva to lock her Dobermann in a room, claiming that he was afraid of dogs, and then pretended to inspect the pipes and radiators for a while before asking her to pour him some water. When Mezhueva went to the kitchen, Artamonov followed her and struck her four times on the head with the axe's butt and blade, fracturing her skull and destroying her brain. After killing her, he stole 12 million rubles, a video recorder, five video tapes, and gold earrings.

Initially, Irina's husband, Sergei, was considered the prime suspect after a neighbour's little girl told police that she had heard a woman's screams shortly after he had returned home. While Sergei claimed that he was somewhere else at the crime scene, an inspection revealed that this was untrue. In addition, investigators checked the house of some of his close relatives, where they found an axe almost identical to the murder weapon. Finally, it was noted that the dog seemed to not be alerted by the criminal, who had evidently been willingly invited into the house. While Sergei's guilt seemed obvious at first glance, investigators noticed that there were too many inconsistencies and eventually released him after he was detained for five months.

In 1996, Artamonov committed two more murders and one attempted murder. On 27 March, he killed a 68-year-old former English teacher, and on the next day, he unsuccessfully attempted to rob that same house. On 4 October, he was caught stealing sheep in Malaya Purga, for which he was sentenced to 4 years probation. On 7 February 1997, Artamonov was met with fierce resistance during another attack, as a result of which he dropped his axe and hat at the crime scene, leaving traces of blood and his own hair.

On 19 February, Artamonov killed a 72-year-old woman, and two days later, he killed his final victim, a 65-year-old pensioner who lived on a nearby street.

The so-called "Plumber murders" led to a public outcry and moral panic in the city, leading to people becoming increasingly vigilant and police officers detaining dozens of suspicious people after receiving calls from alarmed citizens. In the winter of 1997, the investigation released an identikit of the perpetrator, compiled from the testimony of surviving victims, which proved to be very similar to Artamonov.

== Arrest, investigation and trial ==
Artamonov was arrested at a marketplace on 7 March 1997, while attempting to sell a power planer he had stolen from one of the victims. He almost immediately confessed to all the crimes, and he was eventually charged with 21 crimes, including five murders, four attempted murders, and a series of thefts and robberies. A forensic psychiatric examination found him to be sane, and he was allowed to stand trial.

When the trial began, Artamonov's mother insisted that her son be given the death sentence. In November 1997, the Supreme Court of the Republic of Udmurtia sentenced Artamonov to death, after which he filed an appeal. It eventually reached the desk of President Boris Yeltsin, who commuted the sentence to 25 years in a penal colony. Subsequently, it was further reduced to 22 years and 10 months imprisonment, which Artamonov served at a colony in Sarapul.

== Release ==
On 24 November 2017, Artamonov was paroled and returned to Izhevsk, where relatives said that he moved into an apartment on Pushkin Street. Per his parole conditions, he is obliged to report to the local parole authorities four times a month; is forbidden from attending mass events; to leave his residence from 10 PM to 6 AM; and to leave the city's premises without informing the necessary authorities. His parole conditions are set to last until 2025.

== See also ==
- List of Russian serial killers

== Bibliography ==
- Andrey A. Ivanov - Criminal Wars of Izhevsk, Part 2 (in Russian: Криминальные войны Ижевска, 2 часть) (2017, Monporazhën), p. 204 [in Russian]
