= Buranovo, Togulsky District, Altai Krai =

Buranovo Бураново
- Selo
- Location within Altai Krai Location within Russia
- Coordinates: 53°22′N 85°48′E
- Country: Russia
- Region: Altai Krai
- District: Togulsky District
- Time zone: UTC+7:00

Buranovo (Russian: Бураново) is a rural locality (a selo) in Antipinsky Selsoviet, Togulsky District, Altai Krai, Russia. The population was 188 as of 2013. There are 4 streets.

== Geography ==
Buranovo is located on the Chumysh River, 47 kilometres (29 mi) southwest of Togul (the district's administrative centre) by road. Titovo is the nearest rural locality.
