= Lnozavod, Altai Krai =

Lnozavod Льнозавод
- Settlement
- Location within Altai Krai Location within Russia
- Coordinates: 53°27′N 85°57′E
- Country: Russia
- Region: Altai Krai
- District: Togulsky District
- Time zone: UTC+7:00

Lnozavod (Russian: Льнозавод) is a rural locality (a settlement) in Togulsky Selsoviet, Togulsky District, Altai Krai, Russia. The population was 152 as of 2013. There are 3 streets.

== Geography ==
Lnozavod is located 3 km east of Togul (the district's administrative centre) by road. Togul is the nearest rural locality.
