= Shumikha, Altai Krai =

Shumikha Шумиха
- Selo
- Location within Altai Krai Location within Russia
- Coordinates: 53°37′N 85°59′E
- Country: Russia
- Region: Altai Krai
- District: Togulsky District
- Time zone: UTC+7:00

Shumikha (Russian: Шумиха) is a rural locality (also called a selo) in Togulsky Selsoviet, Togulsky District, Altai Krai, Russia. The population was 77 as of 2013. There are 6 streets.

== Geography ==
Shumikha is located on the Togul River, 27 km north of Togul (the district's administrative centre) by road. Novoiushino is the nearest rural locality.
