= Party for Everybody =

2012 song by Buranovskiye Babushki

Single by Buranovskiye Babushki
- Released: 2012
- Songwriter(s): Olga Tuktaryova, Mary Susan Applegate

Buranovskiye Babushki singles chronology
"Dlinnaja-dlinnaja beresta i kak sdelat' iz nee ajšon" (2010)	"Party for Everybody" (2012)

(Russia) "Party for Everybody"
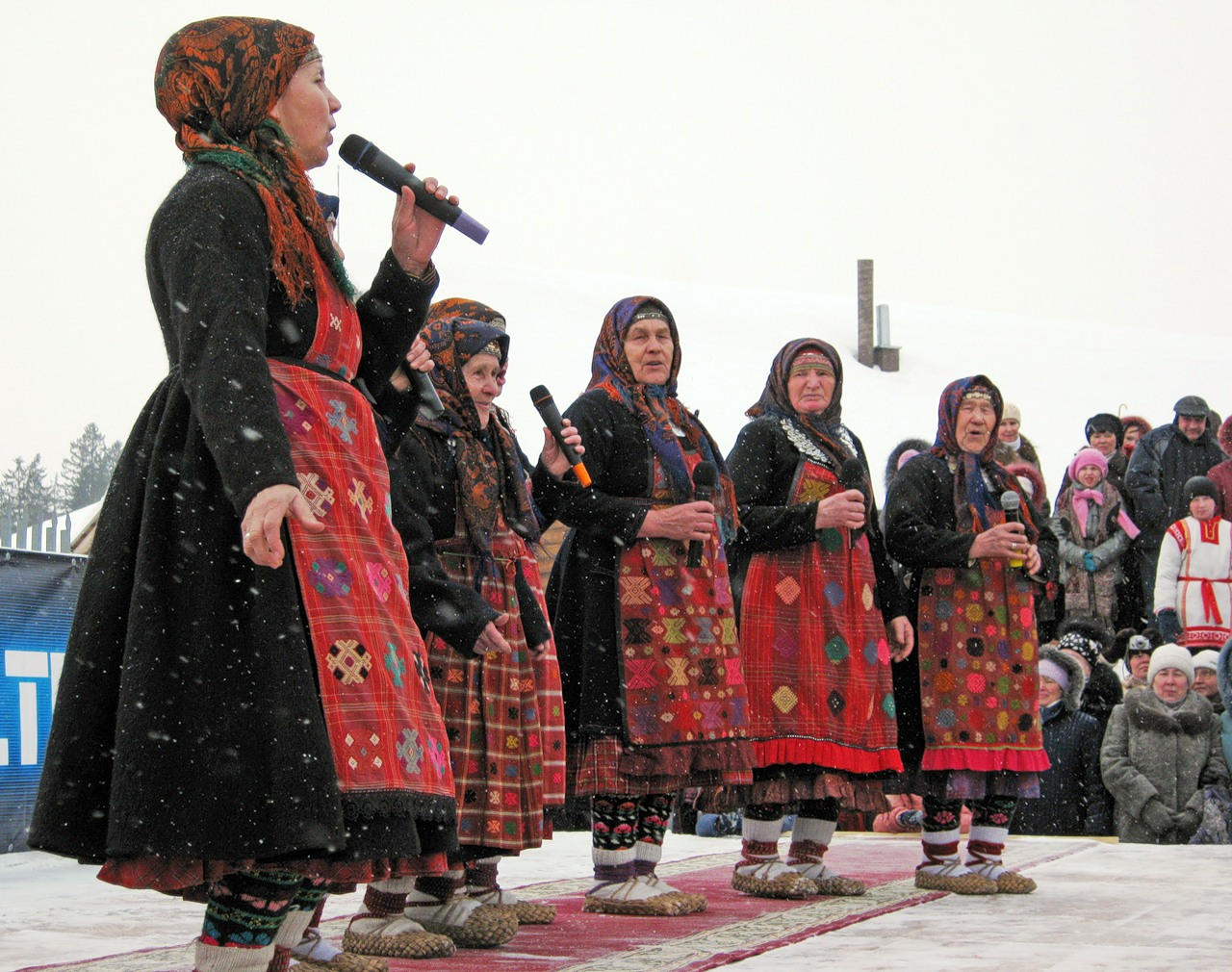

Eurovision Song Contest 2012 entry
- Country: Russia
- Artist(s): Buranovskiye Babushki
- Languages: Udmurt, English
- Composer(s): Viktor Drobysh, Timofei Leontiev
- Lyricist(s): Olga Tuktaryova, Mary Susan Applegate

Finals performance
- Semi-final result: 1st
- Semi-final points: 152
- Final result: 2nd
- Final points: 259

Entry chronology
- ◄ "Get You" (2011)
- "What If" (2013) ►

"Party for Everybody" was the Russian entry for the Eurovision Song Contest 2012 sung by Buranovskiye Babushki (The Grannies from Buranovo). The song won Russia's national song selection, which took place on 7 March 2012 in Moscow.

At the Eurovision Song Contest 2012 held in Baku, Azerbaijan, the song finished in second place with 259 points.

== Composition ==
Most of the lyrics are in the Udmurt language. During an interview with group the correspondent of Komsomolskaya Pravda, group member Olga Tuktareva said that the group wrote the song themselves, whereas the English parts were written by an unnamed British person. She said: "I will not even say the name of the author, I can't pronounce it, she's not Russian" (the English lyricist was actually the famous American songwriter, Mary Susan Applegate, best known for composing Jennifer Rush's "The Power of Love"). The music for "Party for Everybody" is written by the famous composer Victor Drobysh. Notably, the Udmurt and English words were written separately. When the Buranovskie Babushki came to the studio with their written text, the English part, too, was ready. A member of the ensemble stated what some parts of the song mean in English: "We sing about lighting the oven, kneading dough, and spreading out a tablecloth while waiting for the children to come home. And we say when our children come home, we will have fun and dance.".

The members of the group also stated that learning the English words wasn't too difficult.

== Selection process ==
The song won Russia's national song selection, which took place on 7 March 2012 in Moscow. The result of adding the proportional viewers and judges voting score for the group was 38.51 points, ahead of Eurovision 2008 winner Dima Bilan and t.A.T.u. member Yulia Volkova with their duet song "Back to Her Future" who had 29.26 points.

== At Eurovision ==
The group performed the song in the first semi-final on 22 May 2012 and came 1st with 152 points. It advanced into the finals on 26 May. The group performed sixth in the line-up and eventually finished in second place with a total of 259 points, behind the winning song, "Euphoria", by Loreen of Sweden. This was Russia's best result in 3 years since their first win in 2008.

== Critical reception ==
The song received mixed to positive reviews from critics and music producers. Artur Gasparyan told reporters that Europe could find the Buranovskie Grannies a "musical ride", so their "chance to win is minimal," and Iosif Prigozhin says that "despite the lack of confidence in the leadership, The Buranovskie Babushki might win the contest, because of their originality and individuality". Igor Krutoy called the ensemble "excellent" and said that "do not be surprised if they also win the Eurovision Song Contest". Valery Meladze says that they were his favourite choice.

== Charts ==
Chart (2012)	Peak position
Austria (Ö3 Austria Top 40)	38
Belgium (Ultratop 50 Flanders)	37
Germany (GfK)	44
Ireland (IRMA)	61
Russia (Digital Chart)	1
Sweden (Sverigetopplistan)	43
United Kingdom (Official Charts Company)	159
