= Ivan Kupala (band) =

Russian band

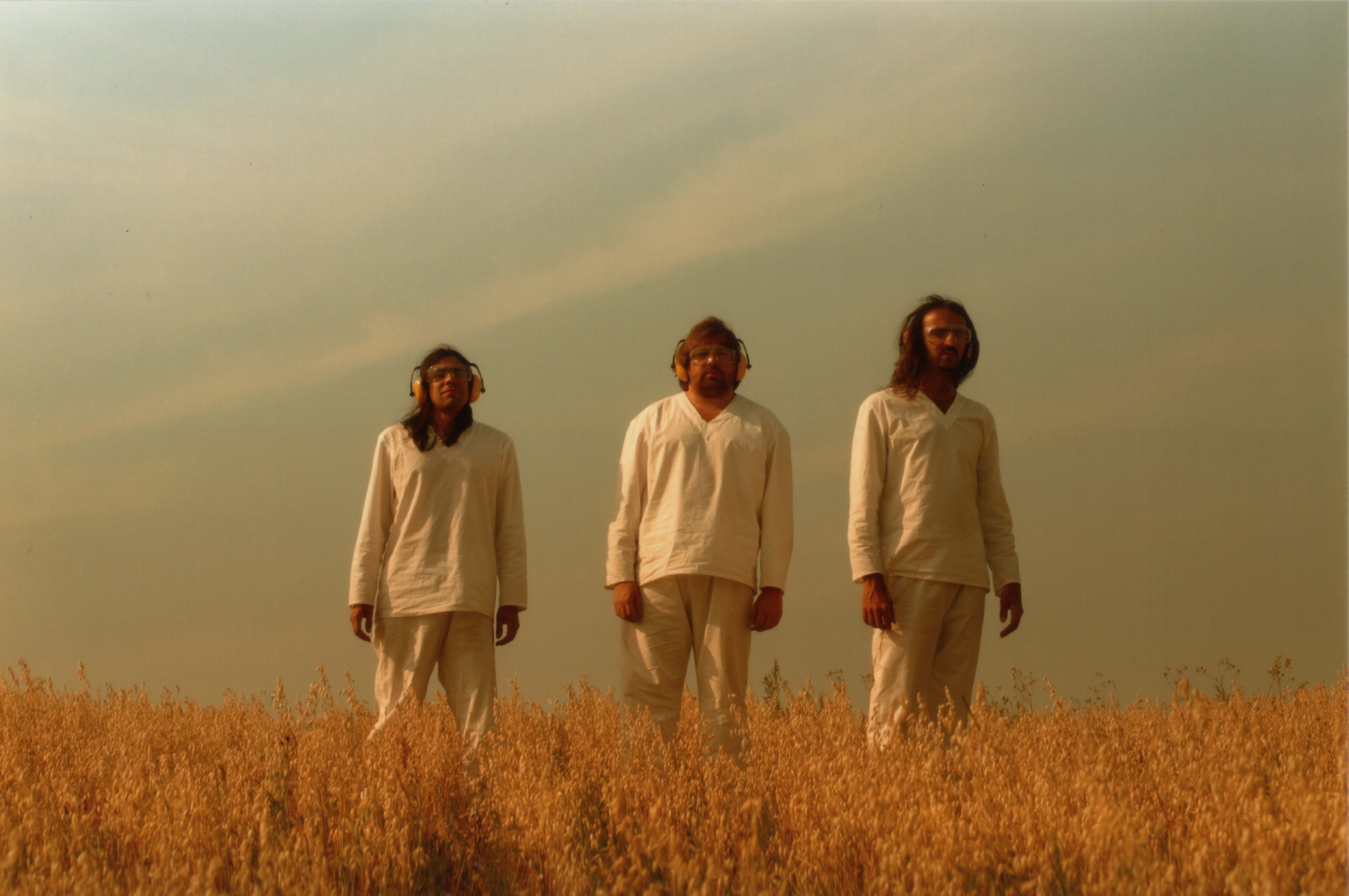

Background information
- Origin: Russia, Saint Petersburg
- Genres: World, new age, ethnic electronica
- Years active: 1996–2017
- Label: Soyuz
- Members: Denis Fyodorov; Alexei Rumyantsev; Alexei Ivanov
- Website: www.kupala.ru

Ivan Kupala (Russian: Иван Купала) is a Russian music band from Saint Petersburg comprising Denis Fyodorov, Alexei Rumyantsev and Alexei Ivanov. The group mixes traditional Russian folk songs with electronic sounds, producing a unique blend of world music. The band is named for the traditional Slavic holiday.

Their debut album Kostroma (named after East Slavic fertility goddess) was highly praised by critics. In 1999 and 2000, "Ivan Kupala" won "Ovation" awards as "Folk group of the Year". The title track "Zdorovo, Kostroma" was used in 2014 Winter Olympics opening ceremony.

The band has made a cultural impact reinventing an authentic Russian folklore. Some Russian critics noted that the success of "Buranovskiye Babushki" on Eurovision 2012 was anticipated by "Ivan Kupala".

The group was disbanded in 2017.

== Discography ==
=== Albums ===
- 1999 – Кострома / Kostroma
- 2002 – Радио Награ / Radio Nagra
- 2012 – Родина / Rodina

=== Singles ===
- 2008 – Родина / Rodina
- 2011 – Старый / Staryi

=== Compilations ===
- 2000 – Здорово, Кострома / Zdorovo, Kostroma (remixes)
- 2003 – Лучшие песни 96-03 / Best Songs 96-03

== Videos ==
- Кострома / Kostroma
- Молодость / Molodost'
- Ящер / Yashcher
- Пчёлы-2 / Pchyoly-2
- Live in Korsakov, Sakhalin, Russia. 2004, DVD5, 28 minutes

== Awards ==
- Golden Gramophone (2000)
