= The Best Exotic Marigold Hotel (soundtrack) =

The Best Exotic Marigold Hotel (Music from the Motion Picture)

Film score by Thomas Newman
- Released: 6 March 2012
- Recorded: 2011–2012
- Studio: Abbey Road, London
- Genre: Soundtrack
- Length: 46:42
- Label: Sony Classical
- Producer: Thomas Newman

Thomas Newman chronology
| The Iron Lady (2012) | The Best Exotic Marigold Hotel (2012) | Skyfall (2012) |

The Best Exotic Marigold Hotel (Music from the Motion Picture) is the soundtrack to the 2012 film of the same name, featuring musical score composed by Thomas Newman. It was released on 6 March 2012 through Sony Classical Records in digital formats, followed by a physical release on 27 March.

== Development ==
The Best Exotic Marigold Hotel marked Newman's second collaboration with Madden after The Debt (2010). Madden described it as an unconventional score where each cue has its own feeling and not a series of tunes. Due to the film's Indian setting, Newman used Indian instrumentalists and soloists for the recording sessions, which was held at the Abbey Road Studios in London for four months.

== Reception ==
Filmtracks.com wrote "Newman clearly had fun with this score, and as long as you don't have an aversion to stereotypical Indian musical tones, that spirit will be contagious." James Southall of Movie Wave, described it as a "colourful album" and wrote "while those with an intolerance to the Bollywood style will find those influences seriously harm their capacity to take much from it, others will discover Thomas Newman’s most enjoyable album in years." David Rooney of The Hollywood Reporter wrote "Thomas Newman's flavorful score adds to the intoxicating sensory overload." AllMusic-writer Heather Phares described it as "a soundtrack that's as engaging in its own right as it is in the film".

Newman's original score was shortlisted as one amongst the 104 films in contention for the Academy Award for Best Original Score category for the 85th Academy Awards.

== Track listing ==
The Best Exotic Marigold Hotel (Music from the Motion Picture) track listing
| No. | Title | Length |
|---|---|---|
| 1. | "Long Old Life" | 3:32 |
| 2. | "This Is the Day" | 0:47 |
| 3. | "The Chimes at Midnight" | 2:38 |
| 4. | "Road to Jaipur" | 1:29 |
| 5. | "Night Bus" | 1:15 |
| 6. | "Tuk Tuks" | 1:41 |
| 7. | "The Best Exotic Marigold Hotel" | 2:35 |
| 8. | "Assault on the Senses" | 2:58 |
| 9. | "Anokhi" | 1:10 |
| 10. | "Cricket Spell" | 3:46 |
| 11. | "More Than Nothing" | 2:22 |
| 12. | "Day 22" | 1:41 |
| 13. | "Mrs. Ainsley" | 1:43 |
| 14. | "Do Your Worst" | 1:48 |
| 15. | "Udaipur" | 4:10 |
| 16. | "Turning Left" | 2:00 |
| 17. | "Not Yet the End" | 0:50 |
| 18. | "Progress" | 2:42 |
| 19. | "Young Wasim" | 2:46 |
| 20. | "What Happens Instead" | 0:57 |
| 21. | "A Bit of Afters" | 3:52 |
| Total length: | | 46:42 |

== Chart performance ==
Chart performance for The Best Exotic Marigold Hotel (Music from the Motion Picture)
| Chart (2012) | Peak position |
|---|---|
| UK Soundtrack Albums (OCC) | 15 |
