= Buranovo, Udmurt Republic =

Buranovo Бураново
- Selo

Other transcription(s)
  - Udmurt: Брангурт
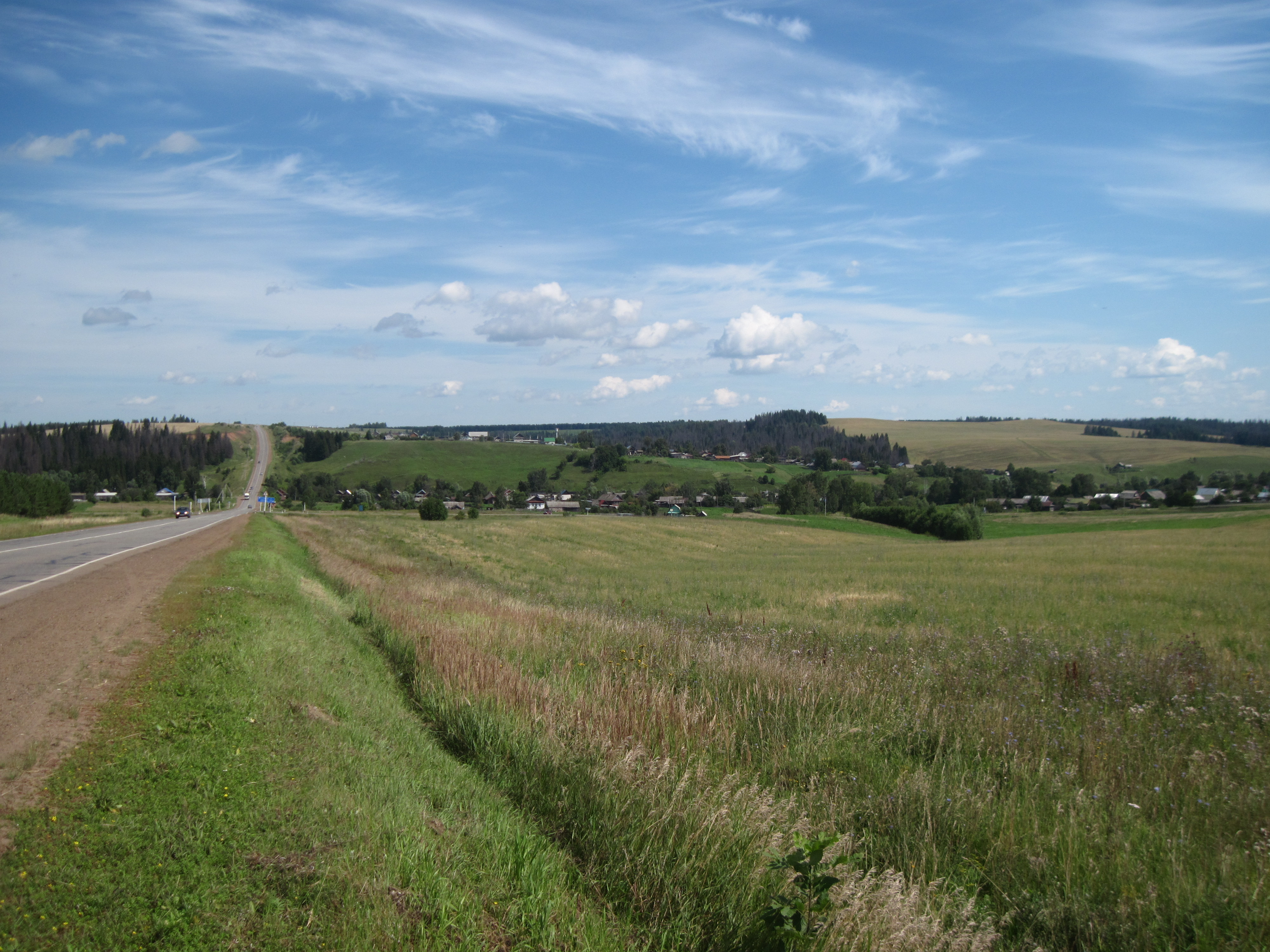
- View of Buranovo
- Interactive map of Buranovo
- Location of Buranovo Buranovo (Udmurt Republic)
- Coordinates: 56°36′N 53°19′E
- Country: Russia
- Federal subject: Udmurtia
- Administrative district: Malopurginsky District
- Selsoviet: Buranovsky Selsoviet
- First mentioned: 1710
- Rural locality status since: 1860

Population
  - Estimate (January 2011): 658 )

Municipal status
  - Municipal district: Malopurginsky Municipal District
  - Rural settlement: Buranovskoye Rural Settlement
- Time zone: UTC+4 (MSK+1)
- Postal code: 427806
- OKTMO ID: 94633420106

Buranovo (Russian: Бураново, IPA: [bʊˈranəvə]; Udmurt: Брангурт, romanized: Brangurt) is a rural locality (a selo) in Buranovsky Selsoviet of Malopurginsky District of the Udmurt Republic, Russia located 30 kilometers (19 mi) from the city of Izhevsk, 34 kilometers (21 mi) from the city of Sarapul, and 30 kilometers (19 mi) from Malaya Purga, the administrative center of the district. As of 1 January 2011, the population was estimated to be 658 residents, of whom 123 are employed in education. Municipally, it is a part of Buranovskoye Rural Settlement of Malopurginsky Municipal District.

== Notable people ==
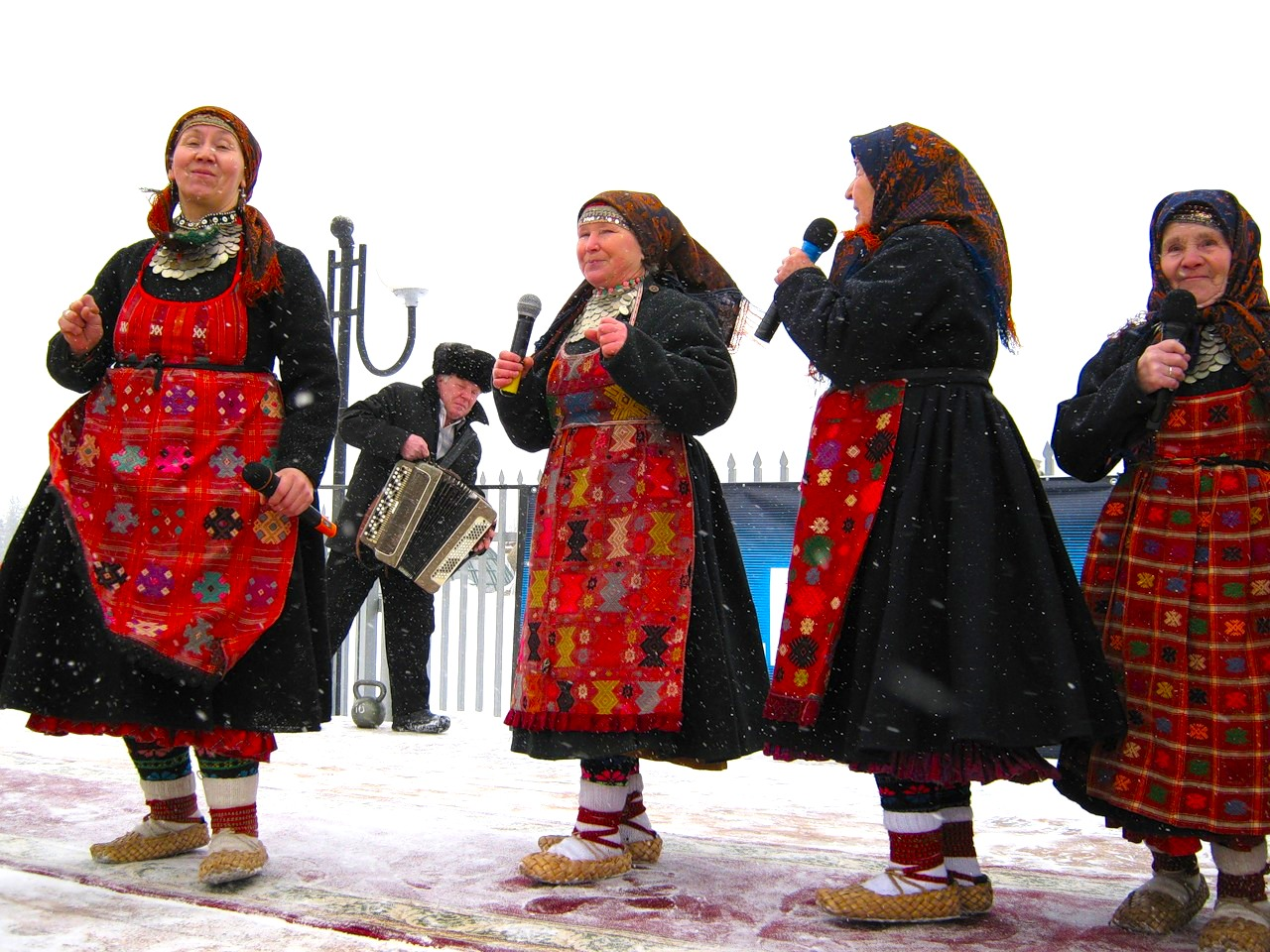
Buranovskiye Babushki perform in 2011

- Buranovskiye Babushki, a folk group who represented Russia in Eurovision Song Contest 2012, are from Buranovo.
