= The Iron Lady (soundtrack) =

The Iron Lady (Original Motion Picture Soundtrack)

Film score by Thomas Newman
- Released: December 20, 2011
- Recorded: September–November 2011
- Studio: Abbey Road Studios, London
- Genre: Film score
- Length: 54:42
- Label: Sony Classical
- Producer: Bill Bernstein; Thomas Newman; Richard Glasser

Thomas Newman chronology
The Debt (2011)	The Iron Lady (2011)	The Best Exotic Marigold Hotel (2012)

The Iron Lady (Original Motion Picture Soundtrack) is the soundtrack to the 2011 film of the same name. The film's original score is composed by Thomas Newman recorded at the Abbey Road Studios in London during September to November 2011, and was released by Sony Classical Records on December 20, 2011.

== Background ==
After finishing his score for The Best Exotic Marigold Hotel (2012), Newman received the offer to screen The Iron Lady and met the director Phyllida Lloyd to discuss about the music. He worked for over two months scoring the film, which he considered "very thematic" and is much more expressive than The Help (2011). The score had moments of British military band, influences from Edward Elgar's music, and has huge orchestral and choral moments. Recorded at the Abbey Road Studios in London, the ensemble consisted of 87-piece orchestra and 28-member vocal choir performing the score.

== Reception ==
Giving a three-and-a-half star out of five, music critic Jonathan Broxton addressed scoring The Iron Lady as a "return to form" from Newman due to his "lack luster output" in his previous ventures. He admitted that "The more large-scale pomp-and-circumstance cues are excellent pieces of effective pastiche, and Newman cleverly captures the duality of Thatcher’s time in power with music that is appealing and optimistic on one hand, but gritty and dramatic when it needs to be. The classical and show tune interludes that depict Thatcher’s own musical tastes are generally well-chosen, effectively complementing the score, and resulting in album that is an enjoyable diversion for fans of Newman’s writing." Filmtracks.com wrote "Newman has succeeded in capturing some of the basic essence of the pomp and drama necessary for The Iron Lady, but his music is ultimately as coldly clinical as Thatcher's demeanor, never allowing its fleeting moments of warmth to develop into a satisfyingly engaging narrative. Enthusiasts of the composer will appreciate the return of his early 1990s mould, but that alone cannot support a rather disjointed overall package."

William Ruhlmann of AllMusic, called it as a "detailed musical portrait of a powerful figure both admired and despised" rating three out of five to the album. James Southall of Movie Wave called that Newman is "back in very fine form" with a "strong album" and gave three out of five to the album. The Hollywood Reporter complimented that Newman's score "shifts effectively between minor-key moods and bombastic authority". Jocelyn Clarke of The Irish Times complimented it as "vintage Newman" stuff and rated four stars out of five.

Thomas Newman's score for The Iron Lady along with The Help and The Adjustment Bureau were shortlisted as one of the contenders for 84th Academy Awards.

== Track listing ==
No.	Title	Artist(s)	Length
1.	"Soldiers Of The Queen"	The Military Band Of The Queen's Regiment	0:50
2.	"MT"		0:49
3.	"Grocer's Daughter"		2:18
4.	"Grand Hotel"		0:46
5.	"Swing Parliament"		3:42
6.	"Eyelash"		1:45
7.	"Shall We Dance?" (From The King and I)	Deborah Kerr; Marni Nixon; Yul Brynner	4:24
8.	"Denis"		1:55
9.	"The Great In Great Britain"		2:21
10.	"Airey Neave"		0:48
11.	"Discord and Harmony"		2:35
12.	"The Twins"		1:04
13.	"Nation of Shopkeepers"		1:45
14.	"Fiscal Responsibility"		1:48
15.	"Crisis of Confidence"		4:04
16.	"Community Charge"		2:02
17.	"Casta Diva" (From Norma)	Maria Callas; Orchestra del Teatro alla Scala; Tullio Serafin	5:34
18.	"The Difficult Decisions"		1:33
19.	"Exclusion Zone"		4:14
20.	"Statecraft"		3:41
21.	"Steady the Buffs"		4:51
22.	"Prelude No. 1 In C Major, BWV 846"	Olli Mustonen	1:53
Total length:			54:42

== Personnel ==
Credits adapted from CD liner notes.

- Choir – London Voices
- Chorus master – Ben Perry, Terry Edwards
- Composer and conductor – Thomas Newman
- Concertmaster – Thomas Bowes
- Contractor – Isobel Griffiths
- Assistant contractor – Jo Buckley
- Design – WLP Ltd.
- Assistant engineer – Aled Jenkins, Lewis Jones
- Mastered By – Patricia Sullivan
- Orchestration, vocal arrangements – J.A.C. Redford
- Producer – Bill Bernstein, Thomas Newman, Richard Glasser
- Recorded and Mixed By – Simon Rhodes
