= Buranovo, Ust-Kalmansky District, Altai Krai =

Buranovo Бураново
- Selo
- Location within Altai Krai Location within Russia
- Coordinates: 52°01′N 82°56′E
- Country: Russia
- Region: Altai Krai
- District: Ust-Kalmansky District
- Time zone: UTC+7:00

Buranovo (Russian: Бураново) is a rural locality (a selo) in Kabanovsky Selsoviet, Ust-Kalmansky District, Altai Krai, Russia. The population was 207 as of 2013. There are 5 streets.

== Geography ==
Buranovo is located 36 km southwest of Ust-Kalmanka (the district's administrative centre) by road. Ust-Yermilikha is the nearest rural locality.
