= What If (Dina Garipova song) =

2013 song by Dina Garipova

Single by Dina Garipova
- Released: 18 March 2013
- Length: 3:04
- Label: Universal Music
- Songwriter(s): Gabriel Alares, Joakim Björnberg, Leonid Gutkin

Music video
- "What If" on YouTube

Eurovision Song Contest 2013 entry
- Country: Russia
- Artist(s): Dina Garipova
- Language: English
- Composer(s): Gabriel Alares, Joakim Björnberg, Leonid Gutkin
- Lyricist(s): Gabriel Alares, Joakim Björnberg, Leonid Gutkin

Finals performance
- Semi-final result: 2nd
- Semi-final points: 156
- Final result: 5th
- Final points: 174

Entry chronology
- ◄ "Party for Everybody" (2012)
- "Shine" (2014) ►

"What If" is a song recorded by Russian singer Dina Garipova. The song was written by Gabriel Alares, Joakim Björnberg and Leonid Gutkin. It represented Russia in the Eurovision Song Contest 2013, held in Malmö, Sweden. The song qualified the first semi-final of the competition on 14 May 2013 and placed 5th in the final on 18 May 2013, scoring 174 points. Dina also sang the song at the closing ceremonies of 2013 Summer Universiade in her hometown Kazan.

== Track listing ==
Digital download

1. What If – 3:04
2. What If (Karaoke version) – 3:05

== Controversies ==
Quickly after the premiere of the song, some music portals reported possible plagiarism and copyright infringement. There was talk about the similarity to songs: "Skin on Skin" by Sarah Connor, "Pozwól żyć" by Gosia Andrzejewicz, "Painting Flowers" by All Time Low, "All Over The World" by Brian Kennedy and "Carried Away" by Hear'Say. However, the songwriters have denied the allegations.

== Chart performance ==
Charts	Peak position
Belgium (Ultratip Bubbling Under Flanders)	59
CIS Airplay (TopHit)	100
Germany (GfK)	78
Netherlands (Single Top 100)	51
Switzerland (Schweizer Hitparade)	75
UK Singles (Official Charts Company)	161
