= Bujor, Hîncești =

Bujor
- Village
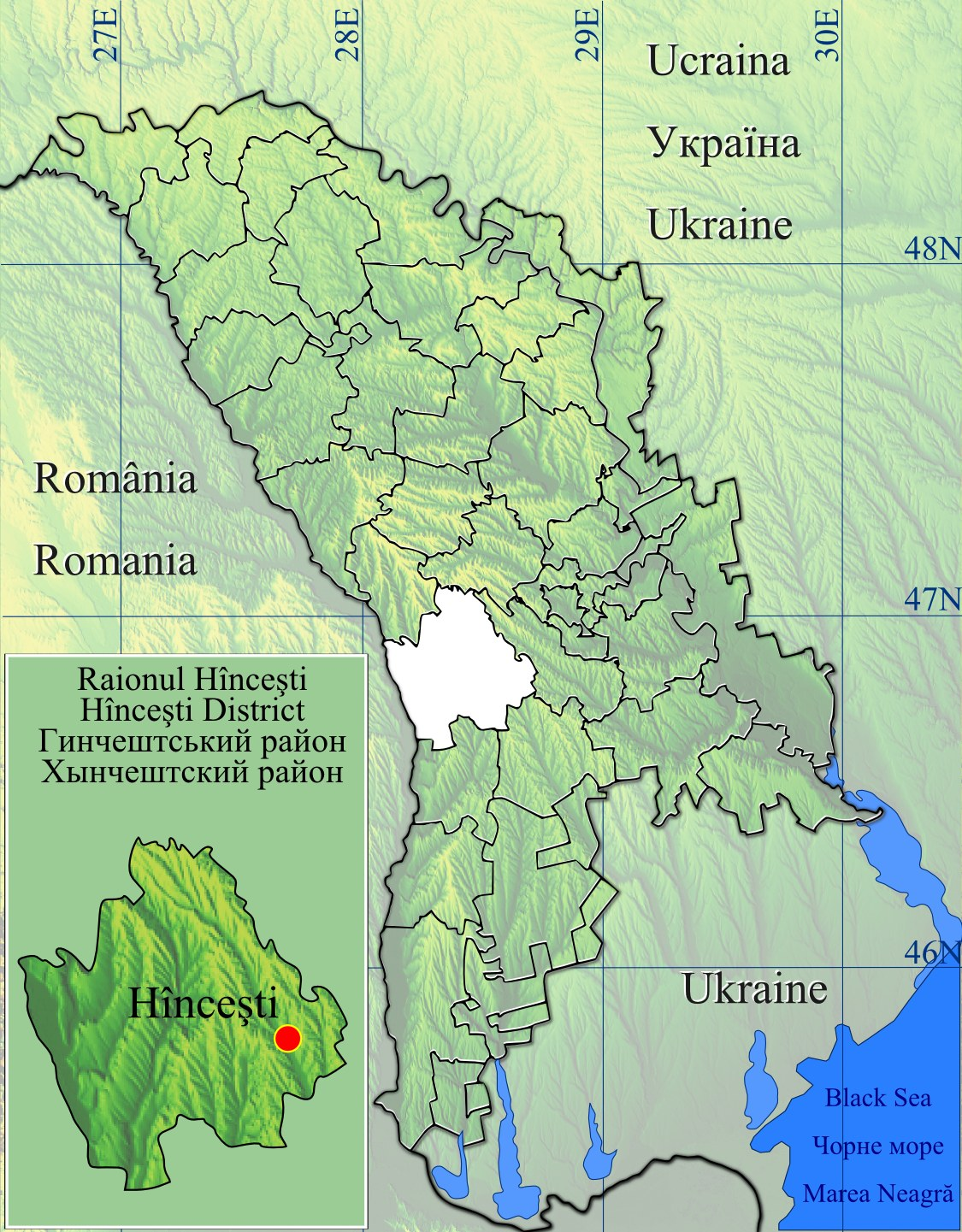
- Location within Hîncești
- Coordinates: 46°55′17″N 28°16′2″E
- Country: Moldova

Government
  - Mayor: Gheorghe Coșleț (PLDM)

Population (2014 census)
  - Total: 3,552
- Time zone: UTC+2 (EET)
  - Summer (DST): UTC+3 (EEST)
- Postal code: MD-3416

Bujor is a village in Hîncești District, Moldova.
