= Malopurginsky District =

Malopurginsky District Малопургинский район (Russian)
- District

Other transcription(s)
  - Udmurt: Пичи Пурга ёрос
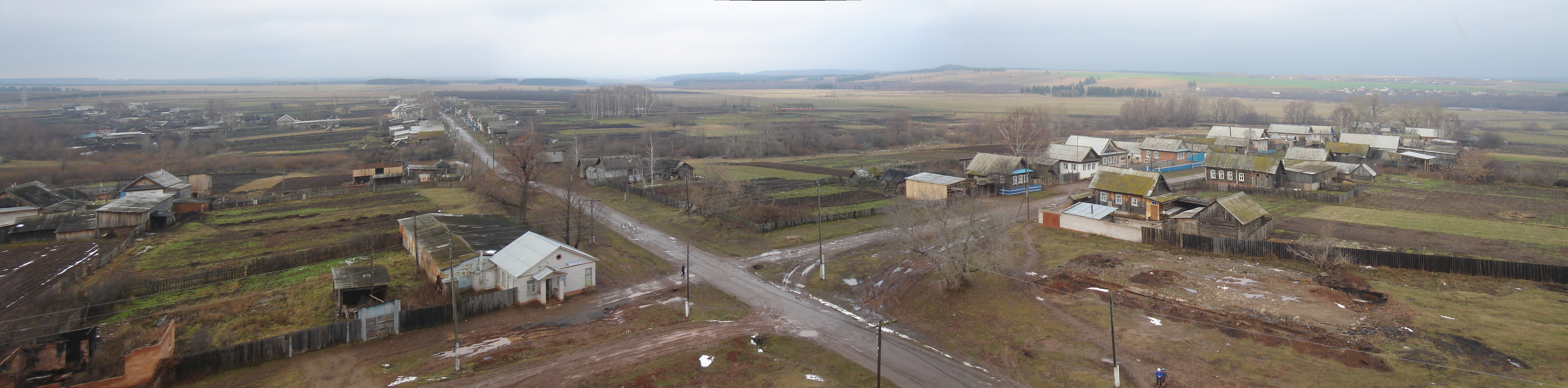
- View of the selo of Ilyinskoye in Malopurginsky District

- Flag Coat of arms
- Location of Malopurginsky District in the Udmurt Republic
- Coordinates: 56°33′15″N 52°59′43″E
- Country: Russia
- Federal subject: Udmurt Republic
- Established: 15 July 1929
- Administrative center: Malaya Purga

Area
  - Total: 1,223.2 km^{2} (472.3 sq mi)

Population (2010 Census)
  - Total: 33,058
  - Density: 27.026/km^{2} (69.997/sq mi)
  - Urban: 0%
  - Rural: 100%

Administrative structure
  - Administrative divisions: 15 selsoviet
  - Inhabited localities: 79 rural localities

Municipal structure
  - Municipally incorporated as: Malopurginsky Municipal District
  - Municipal divisions: 0 urban settlements, 15 rural settlements
- Time zone: UTC+4 (MSK+1)
- OKTMO ID: 94633000
- Website: http://malayapurga.ru/

Malopurginsky District (Russian: Малопурги́нский райо́н; Udmurt: Пичи Пурга ёрос, Pići Purga joros) is an administrative and municipal district (raion), and one of the twenty-five in the Udmurt Republic, Russia. It is located in the south of the republic. The area of the district is 1,223.2 square kilometers (472.3 sq mi). Its administrative center is the rural locality (a selo) of Malaya Purga. Population: 33,058 (2010 census); 31,558 (2002 Census); 30,849 (1989 Soviet census). The population of Malaya Purga accounts for 23.3% of the district's total population.
