= Malaya Purga =

Malaya Purga Малая Пурга
- Selo
- Flag Coat of arms
- Interactive map of Malaya Purga
- Location of Malaya Purga Malaya Purga (Udmurt Republic)
- Coordinates: 56°33′15″N 52°59′43″E
- Country: Russia
- Federal subject: Udmurtia
- Administrative district: Malopurginsky District

Population (2010 Census)
  - Total: 7,711
  - Estimate (2021): 7,604 (−1.4%)

Administrative status
  - Capital of: Malopurginsky District
- Time zone: UTC+4 (MSK+1)
- Postal code: 427820
- OKTMO ID: 94633450101

Malaya Purga (Russian: Малая Пурга; Udmurt: Пичи Пурга, Pići Purga) is a rural locality (a selo) and the administrative center of Malopurginsky District in the Udmurt Republic, Russia. Population: 7,711 (2010 census); 6,879 (2002 census); 6,163 (1989 Soviet census).
