= Metodie Bujor =

Moldovan-Russian singer (born 1974)

- Born: June 9, 1974 (age 52); Kishinev, Moldavian SSR, Soviet Union
- Occupation: Singer
- Website: metodiebujor.com

Metodie Bujor (Russian: Методие Николаевич Бужор, Metodiye Nikolayevich Buzhor; born June 9, 1974) is a classically trained baritone and popular Russian singer.

== Music career ==
Metodie Bujor started his career in 2000 with a Moscow Theater troupe New Opera where he made his debut as Sparafucile in Verdi’s Rigoletto. Since then Bujor has sung as a featured performer at the most famous venues in the world: Mikhailovsky and Mariinsky Theaters in St. Petersburg, Russia, as well as The Leipzig Opera in Germany.

In 2009 Bujor made a decision that completely changed his career. He decided to part with opera and crossover to a more popular format. In the following years he performed in different festivals, gala-concerts and small venues in his beloved St. Petersburg. As a result of his growing popularity Bujor’s first solo concert on May 24, 2012 at the most prestigious concert venue in the city Grand Concert Hall Oktyabrsky, was completely sold out.

== Television ==
In the summer 2012 Bujor auditioned and was chosen to participate in the Russian version of the “Voice” which was broadcast in November 2012 on Channel One, the biggest television network in Russia and seen over twelve times zones nationwide. His breakthrough performances, demeanor and ability to charm the judges and audiences added to his already growing popularity. After the blind auditions, during the battle rounds Bujor’s coach, Russian composer Alexander Gradsky, couldn’t decide which of the artists to pick to go on to the next round. What he did instead is throw a coin. It landed tails and Bujor who was one of the favorites to win, was out. It raised cries of outrage within the viewing audiences and well as strong support among press and Internet coverage.

After realizing how popular Bujor had become Channel One Russia invited him to participate in one of the highest rated programs on Russian television “Two Stars”. where a professional singer takes a celebrity and teaches them how to sing. The show featured at least 12 duets. Bujor’s celebrity partner turned out to be prima ballerina, Anastasia Volochkova. The first episode aired on Channel One on February 15, 2013 and the finale was broadcast on June 7, 2013. During the length of the show Bujor’s ability to connect with the viewers, voice, and personality catapulted him to an “overnight” success.

During filming, Bujor had announced two more solo concerts at the Grand Concert Hall “Oktyabrsky” on December 23, 2012 and March 9, 2013. Both sold out in advance.

== Tour Memories ==
In August 2013 Bujor starts his first solo 57-city tour called “Memories”.

Bujor’s first solo album is scheduled to come out in the fall of 2014.
