= Skyfall (soundtrack) =

Skyfall: Original Motion Picture Soundtrack

Soundtrack album by Thomas Newman
- Released: 29 October 2012
- Recorded: 2012
- Studios: Abbey Road Studios, London
- Genre: Film score
- Length: 77:31
- Label: Sony Classical
- Producers: Thomas Newman; Bill Bernstein

Thomas Newman chronology
| The Best Exotic Marigold Hotel (2012) | Skyfall: Original Motion Picture Soundtrack (2012) | Side Effects (2013) |

Professional ratings
Review scores
| Source | Rating |
|---|---|
| AllMusic | 3/5 stars |
| Filmtracks | 3/5 stars |
| Movie Wave | 4/5 stars |

Skyfall: Original Motion Picture Soundtrack is the 2012 soundtrack album to the 23rd James Bond film of the same name. Released by Sony Classical on 29 October 2012 in the United Kingdom and on 6 November 2012 in the United States, the music was composed by Thomas Newman. This is Newman's first Bond soundtrack, making him the ninth composer to score a Bond film. The score won the BAFTA Award for Best Film Music at the 66th British Academy Film Awards. In 2013, it became one of two Bond scores to be nominated for the Academy Award for Best Original Score at the 85th Academy Awards. The other to be nominated was the score from The Spy Who Loved Me (1977).

== Development ==
Producers Michael G. Wilson and Barbara Broccoli announced on 9 January 2012 that Thomas Newman, frequent collaborator of Skyfall director Sam Mendes, would score Skyfall. On describing how the job became his, Newman said, "I very shyly gave [Mendes] a call or emailed him and said, just so you know, I’d be overjoyed to do it, but would never want to be presumptuous. He emailed me back, saying I was just about to call you, let’s meet for lunch!" Newman took over musical duties for the film from David Arnold who was busy directing the musical aspects of the 2012 London Olympic and Paralympic closing ceremonies. However, Arnold later commented that the reason behind the selection of Newman had been because of his past work with Mendes. Newman's collaborator J. A. C. Redford did the orchestration.

On 6 October 2012, the album's track list was revealed featuring the running times of each track. The first preview of the score was released a few days later on 9 October 2012, while the soundtrack itself was released less than a month later by Sony Classical. This was the second time the label had released a Bond soundtrack, with the first being the Casino Royale soundtrack album.

Unlike most other Bond soundtracks, the soundtrack album to Skyfall does not contain the title song performed by Adele. This marks only the second time that this has happened, the first being the Casino Royale soundtrack album which did not include Chris Cornell's theme song "You Know My Name". Despite this, at the producer's insistence Newman added an interpolation of "Skyfall" in the track "Komodo Dragon", used in a scene where James Bond (Daniel Craig) enters a casino in Macau.

The CD booklet mentions that the score contains interpolations of the "James Bond Theme", written by Monty Norman. Arnold's arrangement of the "James Bond Theme" (which appears on the Casino Royale soundtrack as "The Name's Bond…James Bond") plays over Skyfall's end titles (which begin with the film's gun barrel sequence); however, the track does not appear on the soundtrack album. Newman's arrangement of the theme plays over the reveal of Bond's Aston Martin DB5 and his escape with M (Judi Dench) to Scotland; the track appears on the album as "Breadcrumbs".

"Boum!" by the French singer Charles Trenet featured in the execution scene on the island, but was not included in the soundtrack.

== Track listing ==
All tracks are written by Thomas Newman. Score contains interpolations of "The James Bond Theme", written by Monty Norman. "Komodo Dragon" contains an instrumental interpolation of "Skyfall", written by Adele and Paul Epworth.

Standard album
| No. | Title | Length |
|---|---|---|
| 1. | "Grand Bazaar, Istanbul" (Contains "The James Bond Theme") | 5:14 |
| 2. | "Voluntary Retirement" | 2:22 |
| 3. | "New Digs" | 2:32 |
| 4. | "Sévérine" | 1:20 |
| 5. | "Brave New World" (Contains "The James Bond Theme") | 1:50 |
| 6. | "Shanghai Drive" | 1:26 |
| 7. | "Jellyfish" | 3:22 |
| 8. | "Silhouette" | 0:56 |
| 9. | "Modigliani" | 1:04 |
| 10. | "Day Wasted" | 1:31 |
| 11. | "Quartermaster" | 4:48 |
| 12. | "Someone Usually Dies" (Contains "The James Bond Theme") | 2:29 |
| 13. | "Komodo Dragon" | 3:20 |
| 14. | "The Bloody Shot" (Contains "The James Bond Theme") | 4:46 |
| 15. | "Enjoying Death" | 1:13 |
| 16. | "The Chimera" | 1:58 |
| 17. | "Close Shave" | 1:32 |
| 18. | "Health & Safety" | 1:29 |
| 19. | "Granborough Road" (Contains "The James Bond Theme") | 2:32 |
| 20. | "Tennyson" | 2:14 |
| 21. | "Enquiry" (Contains "The James Bond Theme") | 2:49 |
| 22. | "Breadcrumbs" (Contains "The James Bond Theme") | 2:02 |
| 23. | "Skyfall" | 2:32 |
| 24. | "Kill Them First" | 2:22 |
| 25. | "Welcome to Scotland" | 3:21 |
| 26. | "She's Mine" (Contains "The James Bond Theme") | 3:53 |
| 27. | "The Moors" | 2:39 |
| 28. | "Deep Water" (Contains "The James Bond Theme") | 5:11 |
| 29. | "Mother" | 1:48 |
| 30. | "Adrenaline" | 2:18 |
| Total length: | | 77:55 |

iTunes bonus track
| No. | Title | Length |
|---|---|---|
| 31. | "Old Dog, New Tricks" | 1:48 |
| Total length: | | 79:03 |

== Charts ==
| Chart (2013) | Peak position |
|---|---|
| Polish Albums (ZPAV) | 2 |
| UK Albums (Official Charts) | 36 |
| US Billboard 200 | 100 |

== See also ==
- James Bond music
- Outline of James Bond
