= Togul =

Rural locality of Altai Krai, Russia

Coordinates: 53°28′N 85°55′E

Togul (Russian: Тогул) is a rural locality (a selo) and the administrative center of Togulsky District of Altai Krai, Russia. Population: 4,349 (2010 census); 5,166 (2002 census); 5,471 (1989 Soviet census).
