= Togulsky District =

Togulsky District Тогульский район (Russian)
- District
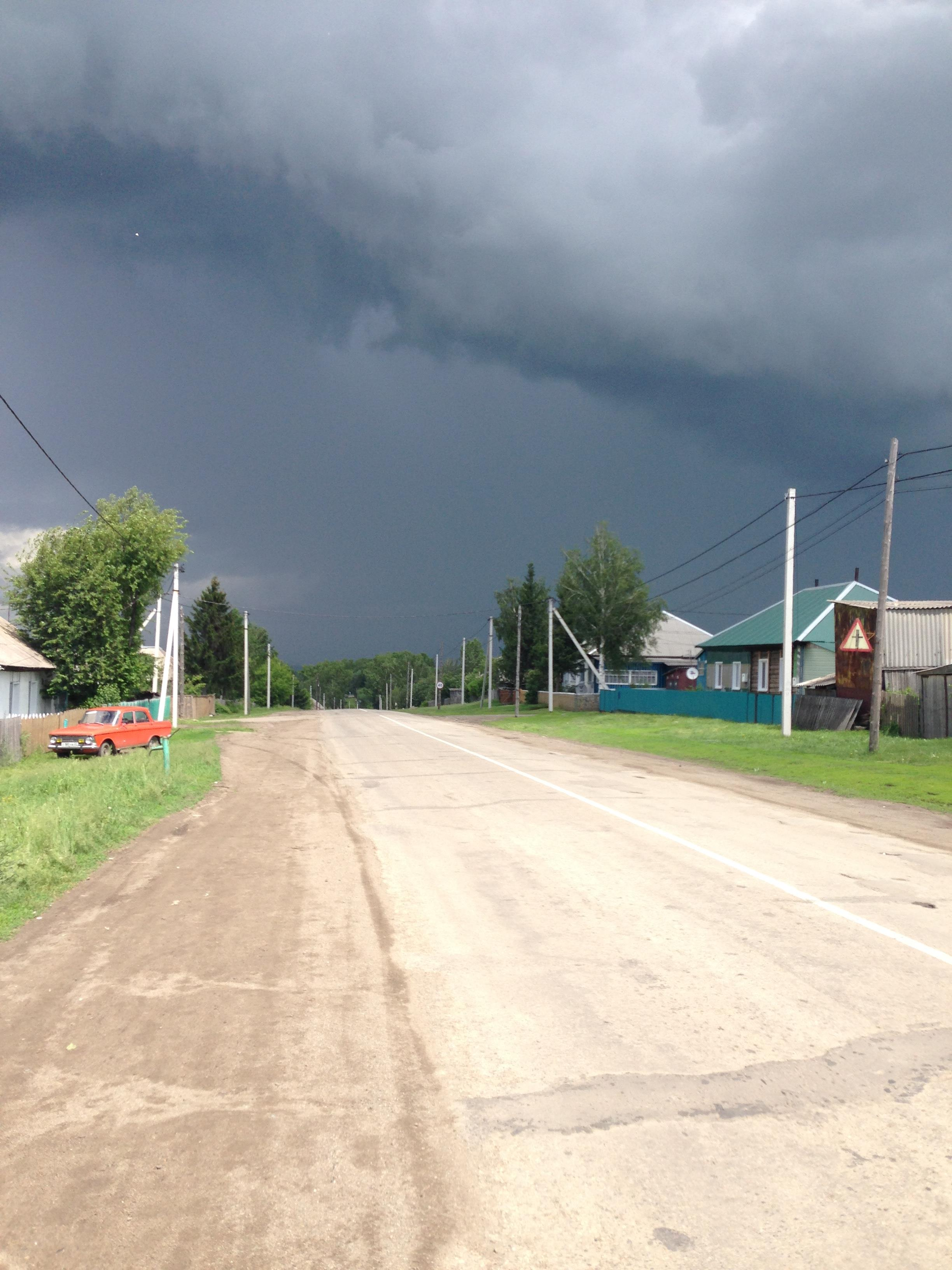
- Street view in Togulsky District
- Location of Togulsky District in Altai Krai
- Coordinates: 53°30′N 85°54′E
- Country: Russia
- Federal subject: Altai Krai
- Established: 1924
- Administrative center: Togul

Area
  - Total: 2,000 km^{2} (770 sq mi)

Population (2010 Census)
  - Total: 8,478
  - Density: 4.2/km^{2} (11/sq mi)
  - Urban: 0%
  - Rural: 100%

Administrative structure
  - Administrative divisions: 5 selsoviet
  - Inhabited localities: 12 rural localities

Municipal structure
  - Municipally incorporated as: Togulsky Municipal District
  - Municipal divisions: 0 urban settlements, 5 rural settlements
- Time zone: UTC+7 (MSK+4)
- OKTMO ID: 01648000
- Website: http://togul.org/

Togulsky District (Russian: То́гульский райо́н) is an administrative and municipal district (raion), one of the fifty-nine in Altai Krai, Russia. It is located in the east of the krai. The area of the district is 2,000 square kilometers (770 sq mi). Its administrative center is the rural locality (a selo) of Togul. Population: 8,478 (2010 census); 10,450 (2002 census); 11,431 (1989 Soviet census). The population of Togul accounts for 51.3% of the district's total population.
