= The Voice Senior (Russian TV series) =

Russian TV series

- Russian: Голос. 60+
- Genre: Music program
- Created by: John de Mol; Roel van Velzen
- Developed by: Talpa Content
- Directed by: Ildous Kurmaleev; Andrey Sychev
- Presented by: Dmitry Nagiev; Larisa Guzeeva
- Judges: Leonid Agutin; Pelageya; Lev Leshchenko; Valery Meladze; Valeriya; Mikhail Boyarsky; Tamara Gverdtsiteli; Elena Vaenga; Garik Sukachov; Stas Namin; Laima Vaikule; Valery Leontiev; Oleg Gazmanov; Valeriy Syutkin; Alexander Malinin; Igor Kornelyuk
- Opening theme: This is The Voice Senior
- Country of origin: Russia
- Original language: Russian
- No. of seasons: 5
- No. of episodes: 23

Production
- Producers: Yury Aksyuta; Evgeniy Orlov; Andrey Sergeev
- Production locations: Moscow, Mosfilm
- Camera setup: Multi-camera
- Running time: 120–135 minutes
- Production company: Channel One

Original release
- Network: Channel One
- Release: September 14, 2018 – October 2, 2022

Related
- The Voice; The Voice Kids; The Voice (franchise); The Voice Senior (Netherlands)

The Voice Senior (Russian: Голос. 60+) is a Russian singing competition television series broadcast on Channel One. Based on the original The Voice Senior, it has aired one season and aims to find currently unsigned singing talent (solo or duets, professional and amateur) contested by aspiring singers, age 60 or over, drawn from public auditions. The winner will be determined by television viewers voting by telephone, SMS text, and The Voice App. The winners of the five seasons have been: Lidia Muzaleva, Leonid Sergienko, Dina Yudina, Mikhail Serebryakov and Raisa Dmitrenko.

The series employs a panel of four coaches who critique the artists' performances and guide their teams of selected artists through the remainder of the season. They also compete to ensure that their act wins the competition, thus making them the winning coach. The original panel featured Leonid Agutin (season 1), Pelageya (seasons 1―2), Lev Leshchenko (seasons 1―3), and Valery Meladze (season 1). The panel for the upcoming fifth season features Elena Vaenga (season 3, 5―), Valeriy Syutkin (season 5―), Igor Kornelyuk (season 5―), and Alexander Malinin (season 5―). Other coaches from previous seasons include Valeriya (season 2), Mikhail Boyarsky (season 2), Tamara Gverdtsiteli (season 3), Garik Sukachov (season 3), Stas Namin (season 4), Laima Vaikule (season 4), Valery Leontiev (season 4), and Oleg Gazmanov (season 4).

The Voice Senior began airing on September 14, 2018, as an autumn TV season programme. In 2022, Channel One renewed the series through its fifth series that premiered on autumn 2022.

== Conception ==
An adaptation of the Dutch show The Voice Senior, Channel One announced the show under the name Голос. 60+ (The Voice. 60+).

In each season, the winner receives ₽1,000,000.

== Selection process and format ==
Blind auditions

Each season begins with the "Blind auditions," where coaches form their team of artists (4 artists in season 1-2, 5 artists since season 3) whom they mentor through the remainder of the season. The coaches' chairs are faced towards the audience during artists' performances; those interested in an artist press their button, which turns their chair towards the artist and illuminates the bottom of the chair to read "Я выбираю тебя" ("I Want You"). At the conclusion of the performance, an artist either defaults to the only coach who turned around or selects his or her coach if more than one coach expresses interest.

Knockouts

The Knockouts are similar to the Sing-offs in The Voice Kids. In the "Knockout Rounds," four (or five) artists within a team sing individual performances in succession. At the conclusion of the performances, coach would decide which two of four (or five) artists get to advance to the Final.

Final

In the final live performance phase of the competition, artists perform in live show, where public voting narrows to a final group of four artists and eventually declares a winner.

Addition

In each season along with determining the winner, television viewers vote for the Best coach (but in season 2 the public didn't determinate the Best coach) using The Voice App and HbbTV option in their TV sets.

== Coaches and presenter ==
=== Coaches timeline ===
Coach	Seasons				
Coach	1	2	3	4	5
Leonid Agutin					
Pelageya					
Lev Leshchenko					
Valery Meladze					
Valeriya					
Mikhail Boyarsky					
Tamara Gverdtsiteli					
Elena Vaenga					
Garik Sukachov					
Stas Namin					
Laima Vaikule					
Valery Leontiev					
Oleg Gazmanov					
Valeriy Syutkin					
Alexander Malinin					
Igor Kornelyuk					

Coaches gallery

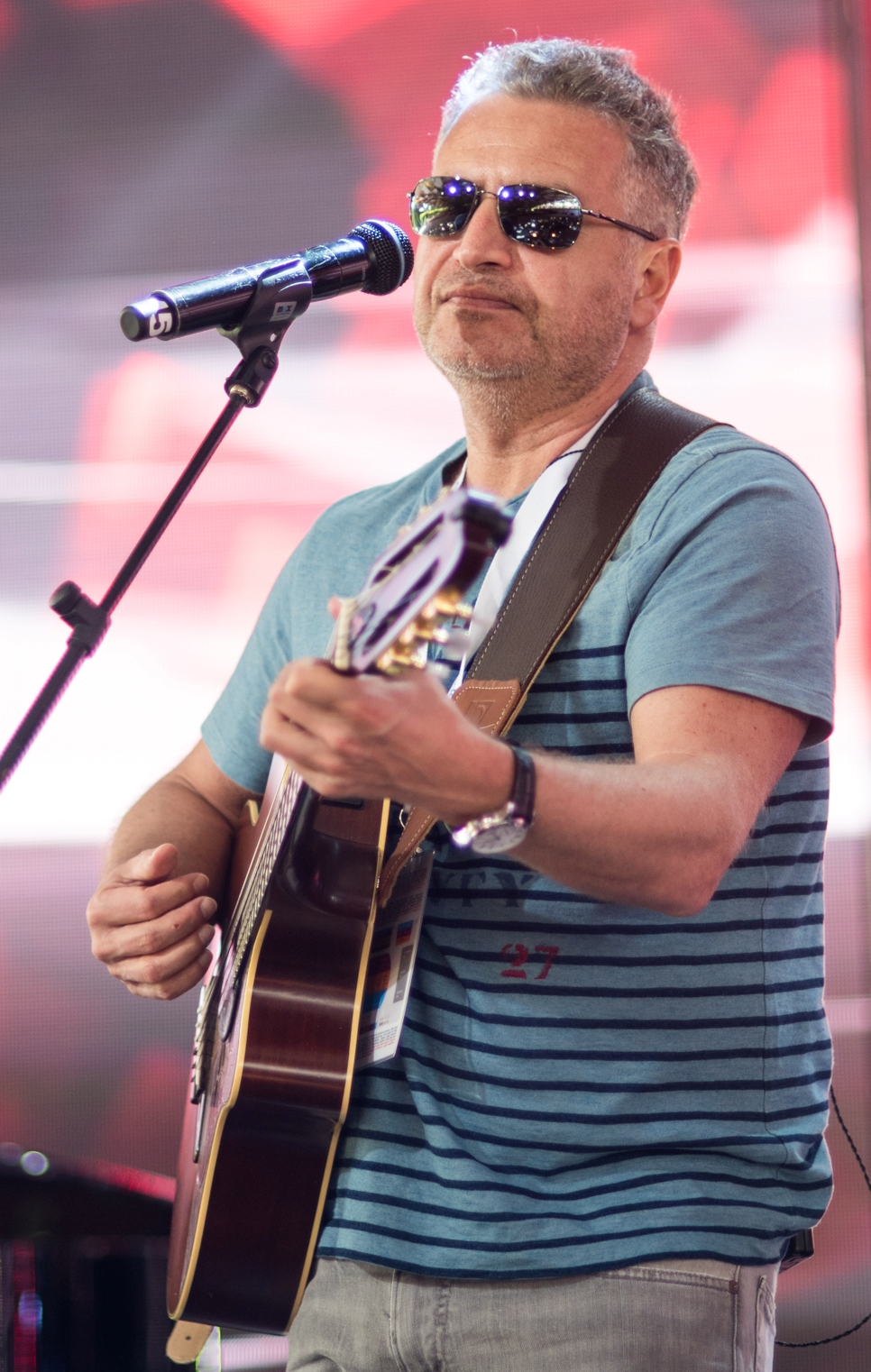
Leonid Agutin (1)

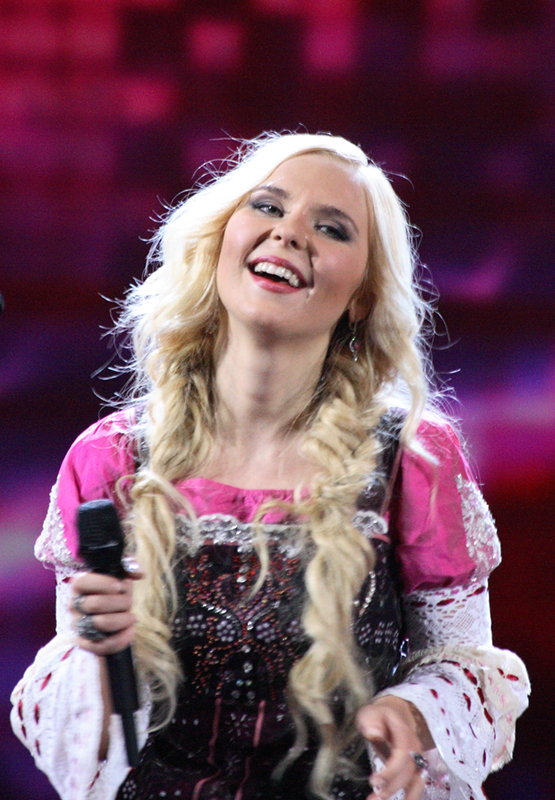
Pelageya (1—2)

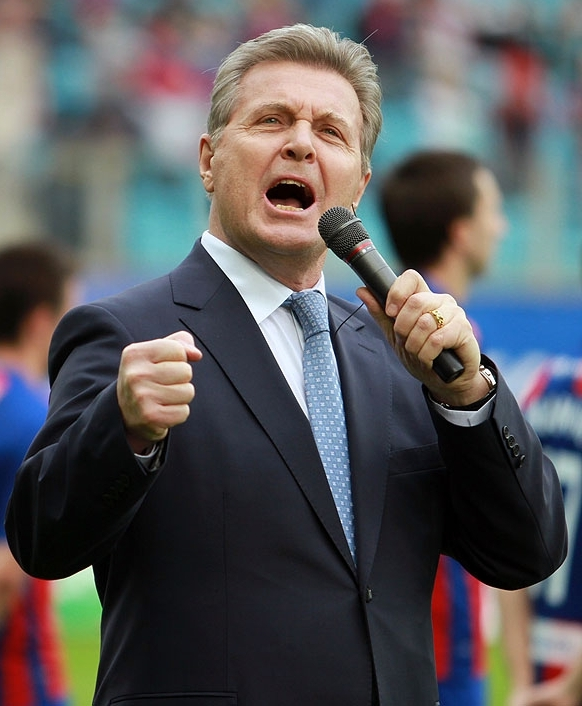
Lev Leshchenko (1—3)

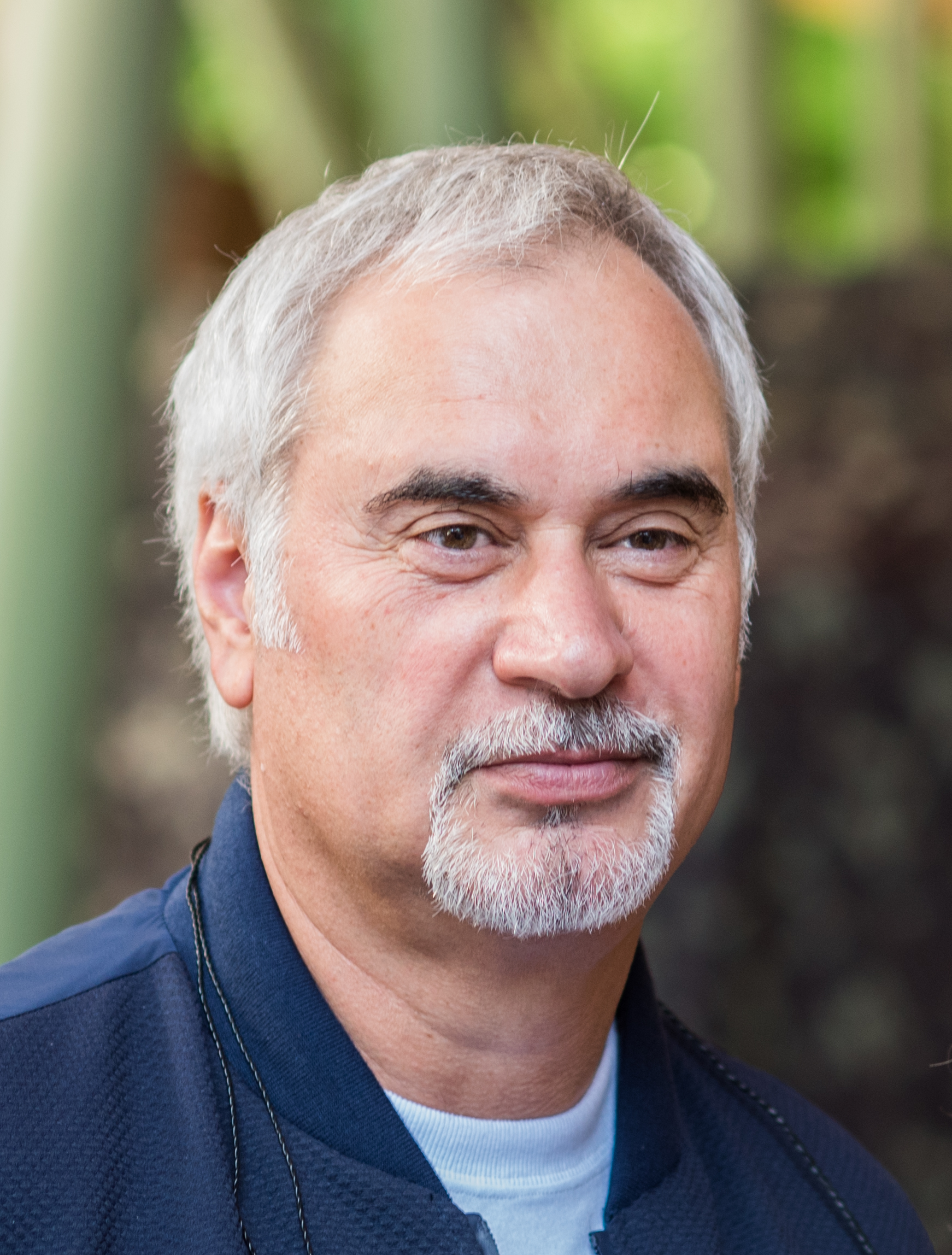
Valery Meladze (1)

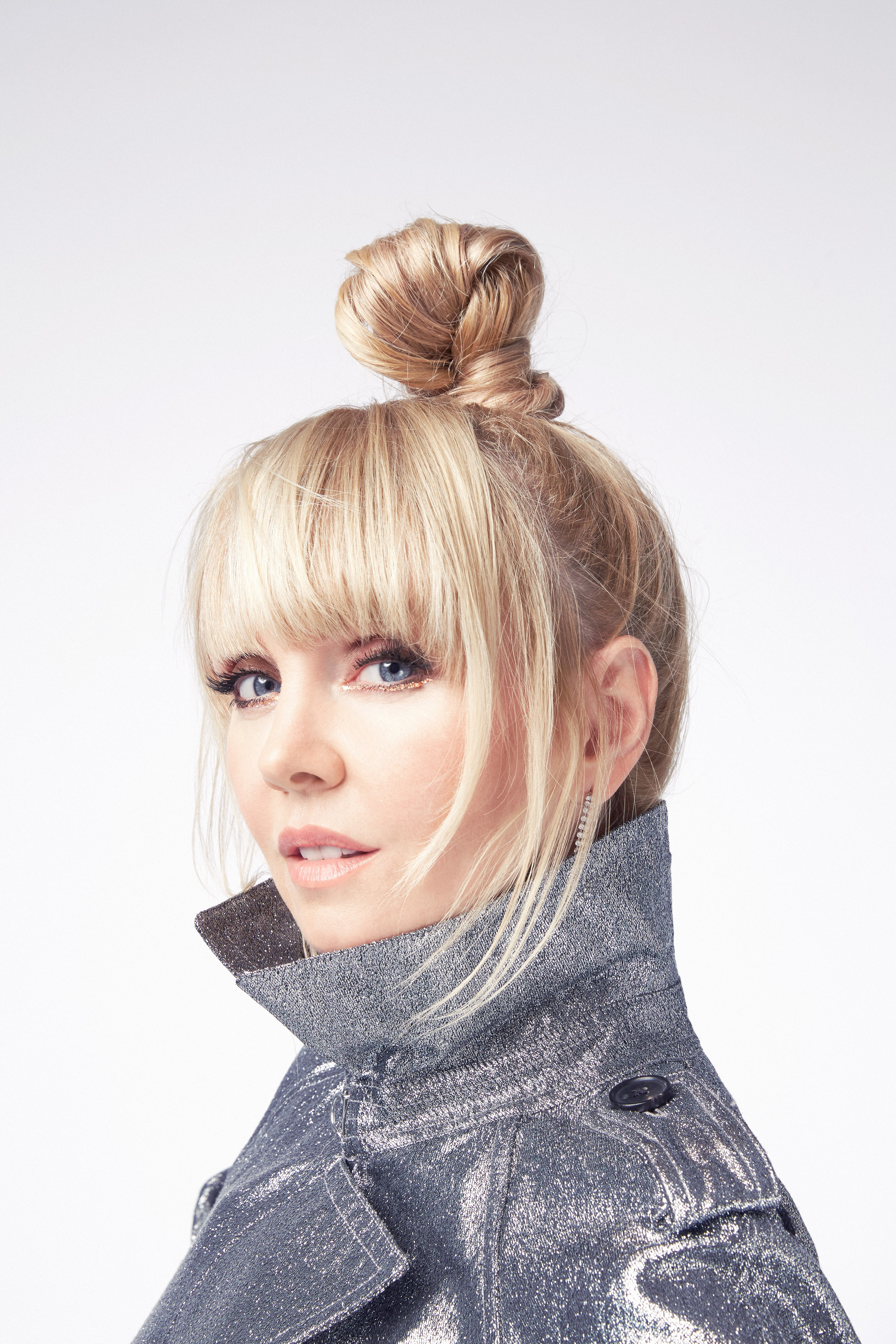
Valeriya (2)

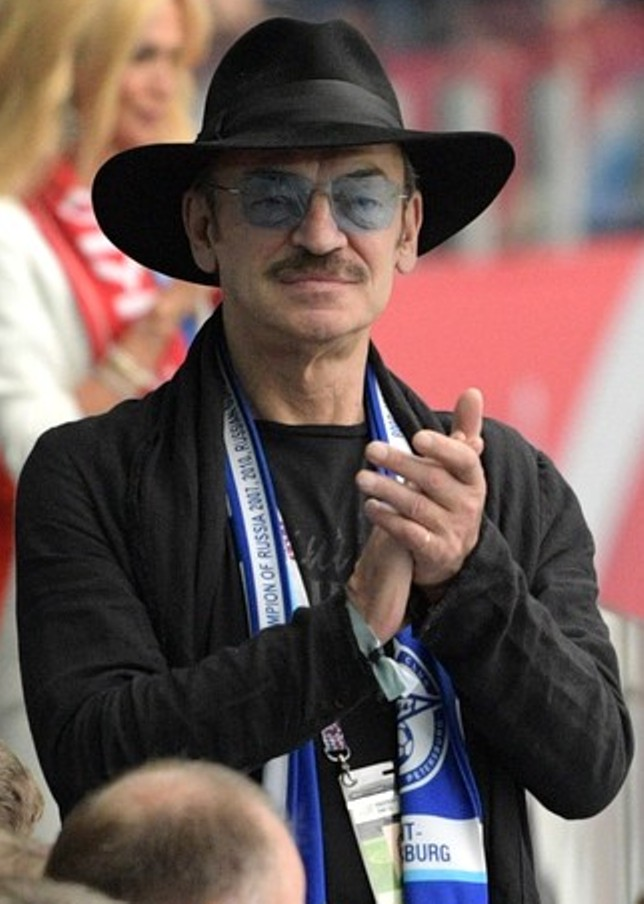
Mikhail Boyarsky (2)

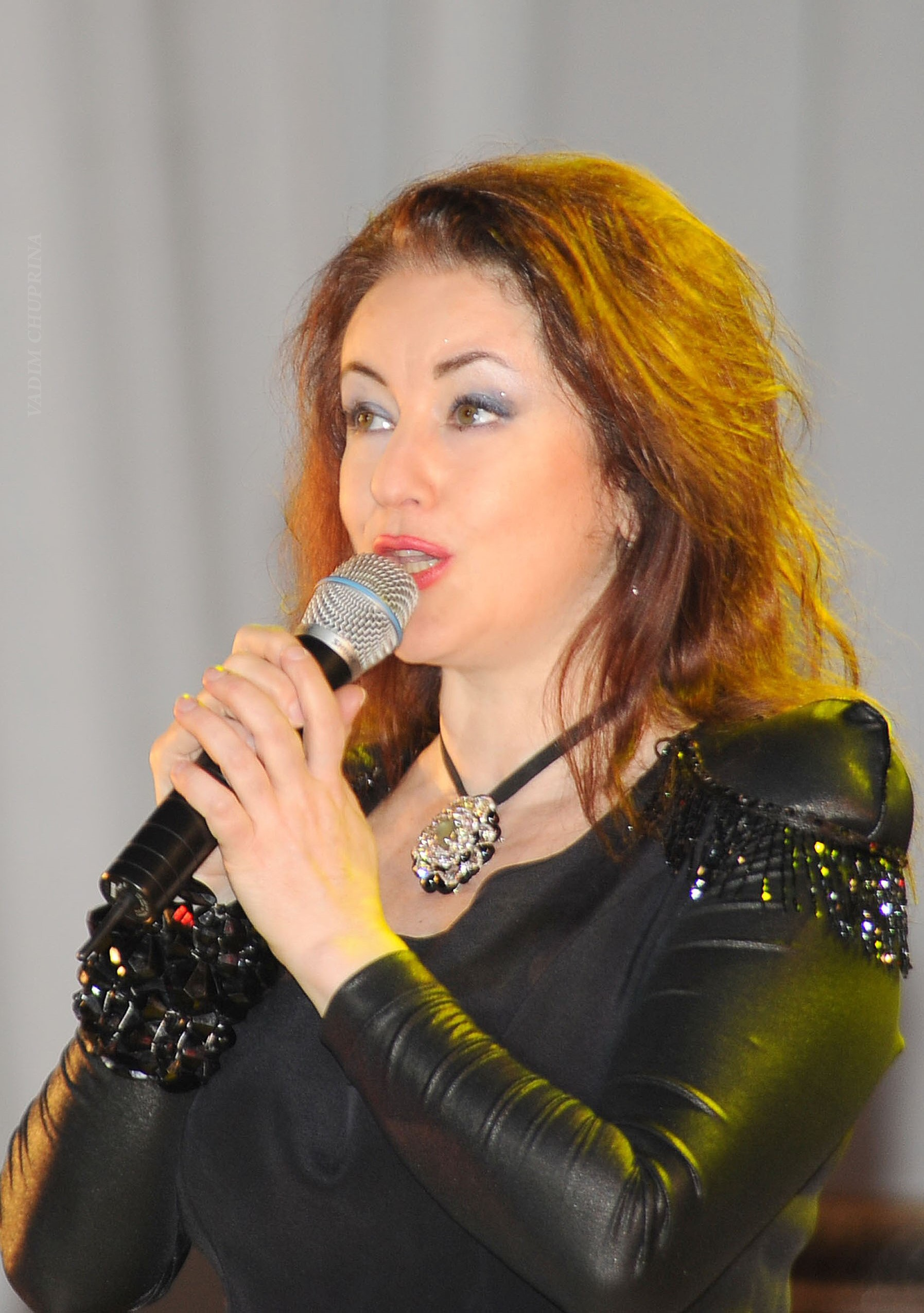
Tamara Gverdtsiteli (3)

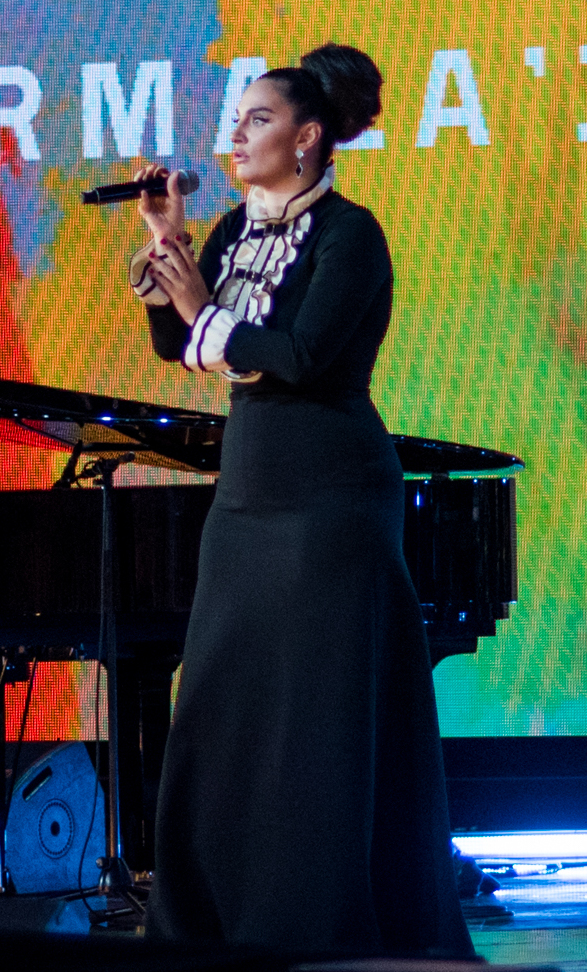
Elena Vaenga (3, 5)

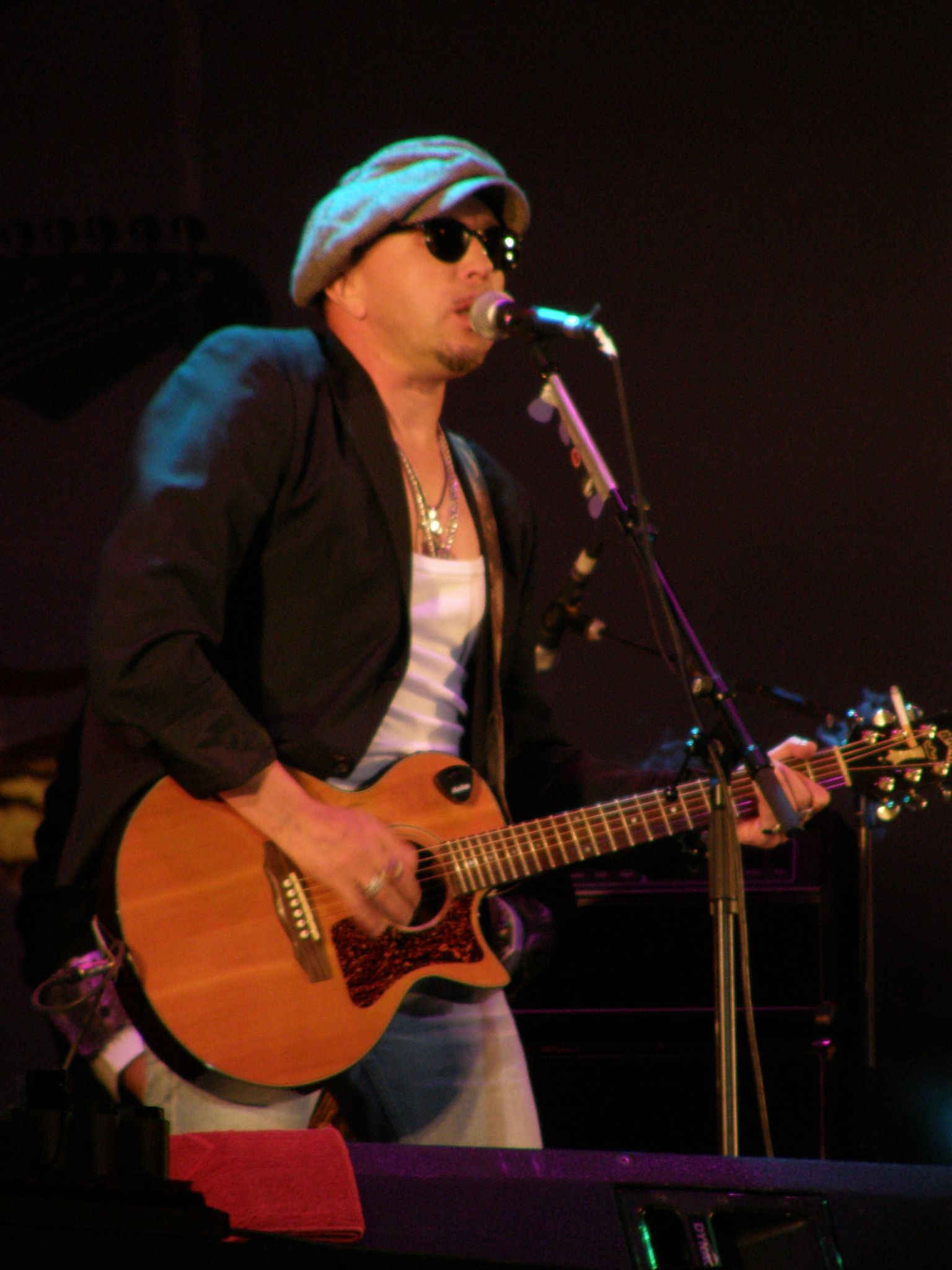
Garik Sukachov (3)

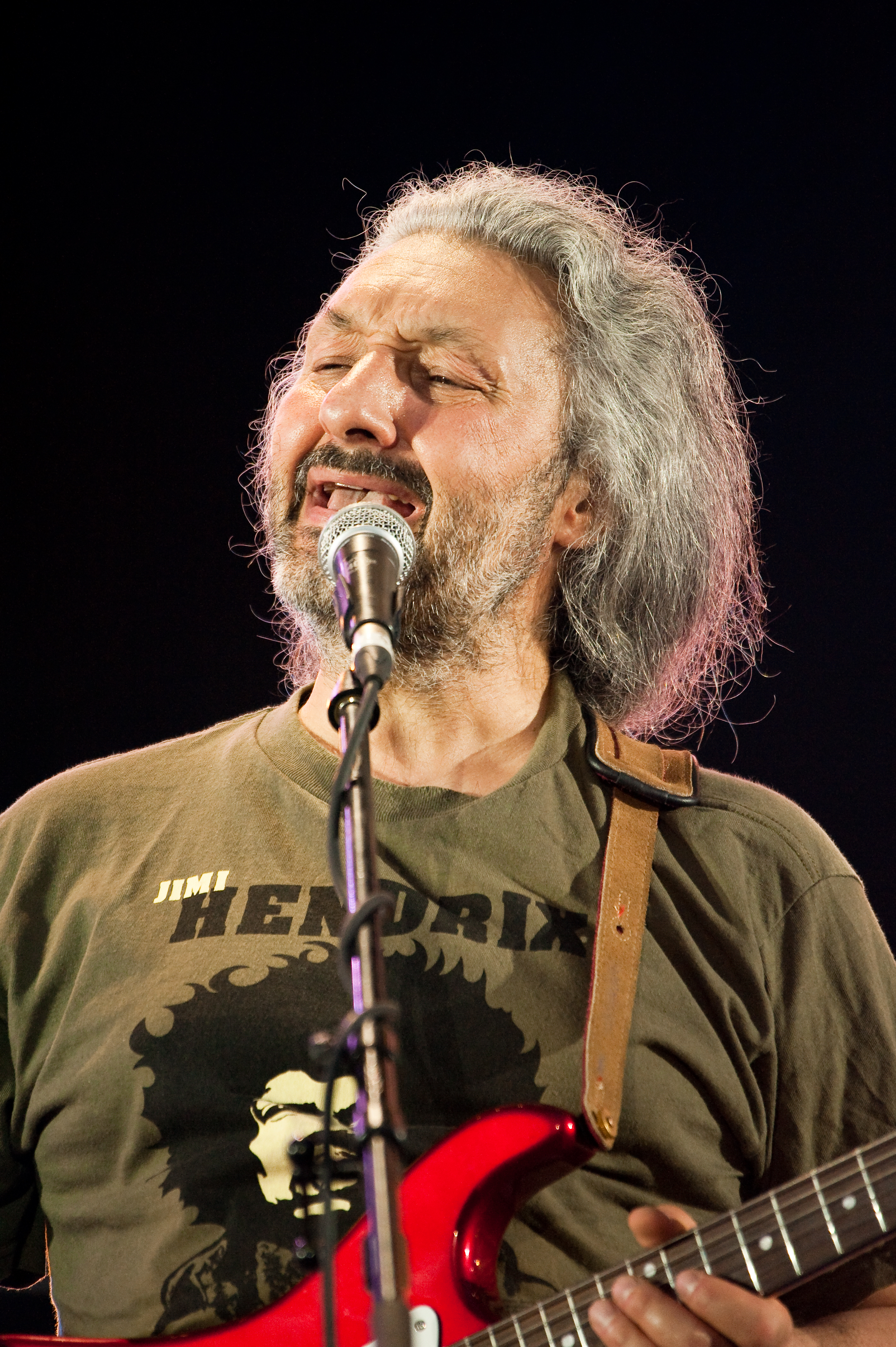
Stas Namin (4)

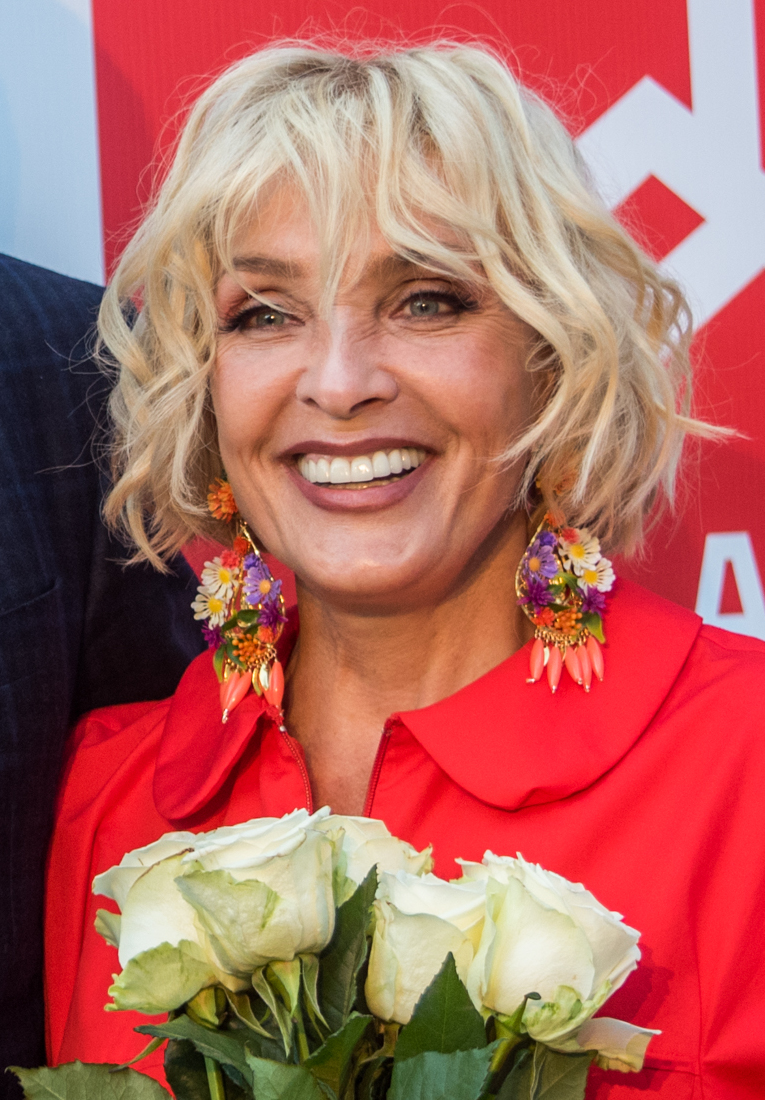
Laima Vaikule (4)

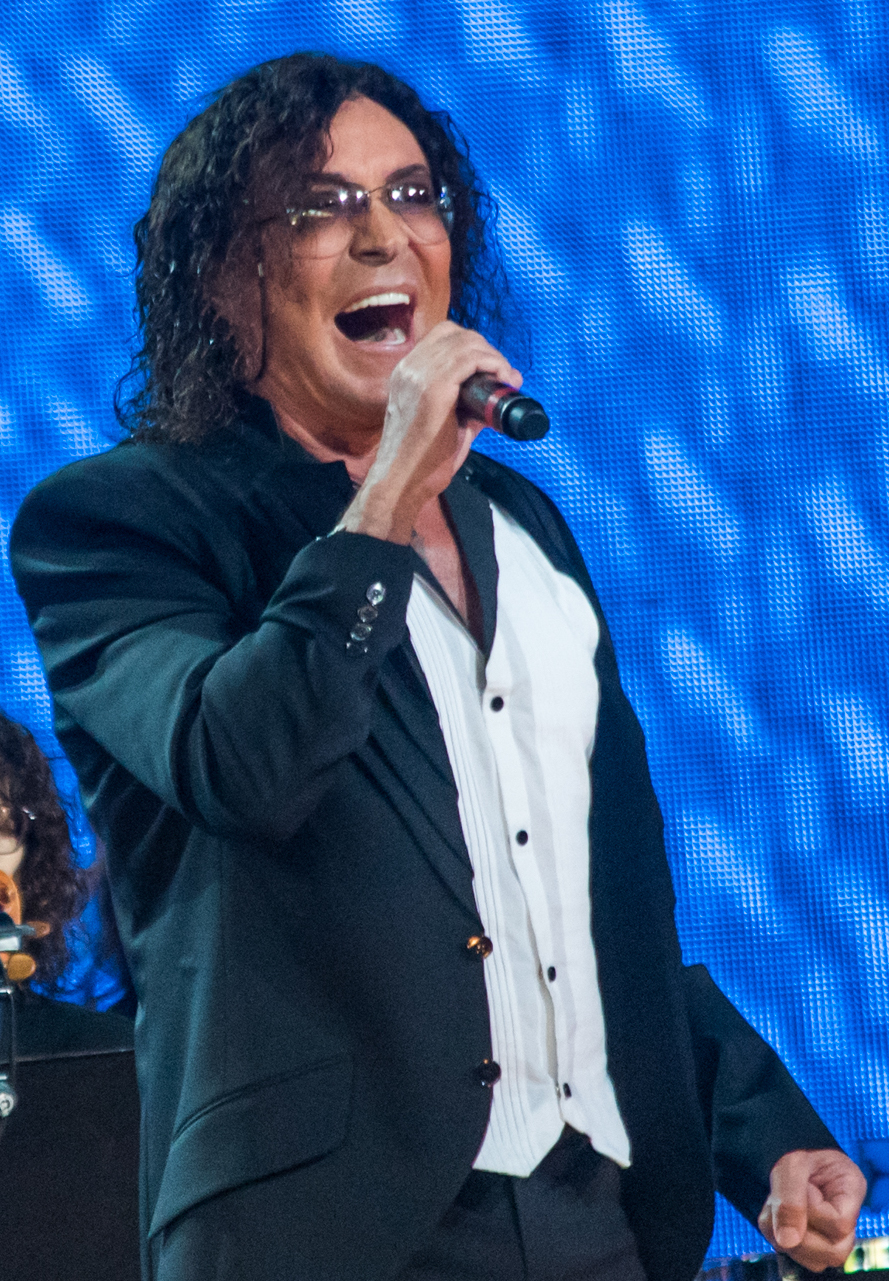
Valery Leontiev (4)

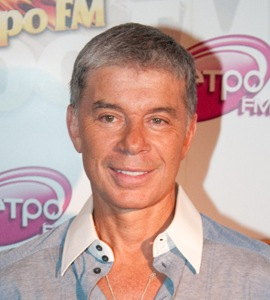
Oleg Gazmanov (4)

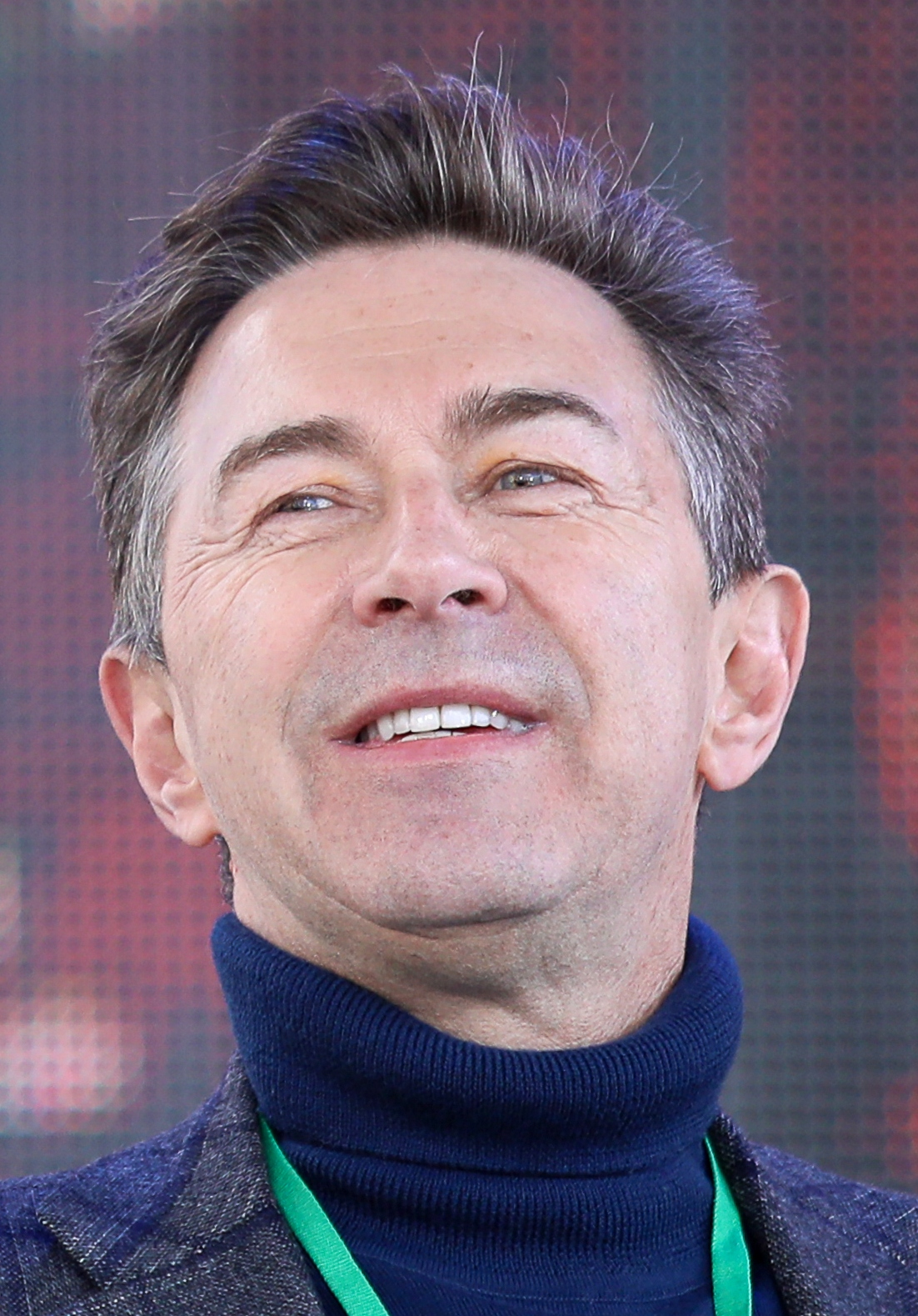
Valeriy Syutkin (5)

Alexander Malinin (5)

Igor Kornelyuk (5)

=== Presenter ===
Presenters	Seasons				
Presenters	1	2	3	4	5
Dmitry Nagiev					
Larisa Guzeeva					

Presenter

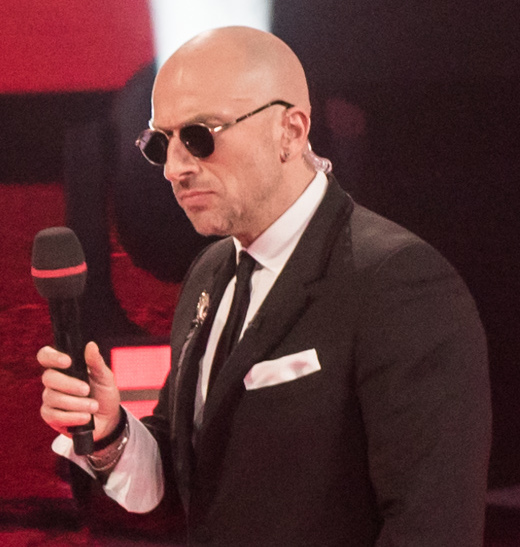
Dmitry Nagiev (1–4)

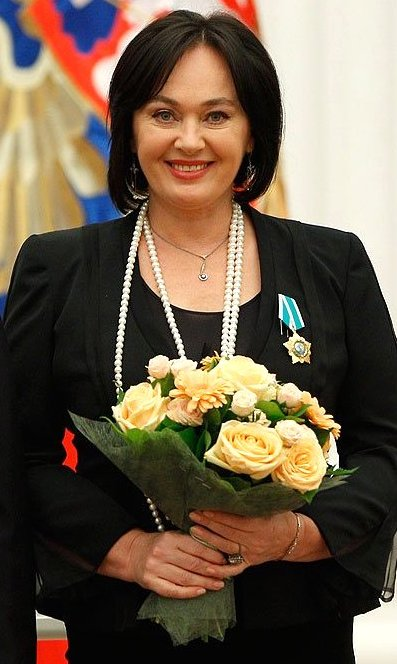
Larisa Guzeeva (5)

== Series overview ==
Team Leonid Agutin
Team Pelageya
Team Lev Leshchenko
Team Valery Meladze
Team Valeriya
Team Mikhail Boyarsky

Team Tamara Gverdtsiteli
Team Elena Vaenga
Team Garik Sukachov
Team Stas Namin
Team Laima Vaikule

Team Valery Leontiev
Team Oleg Gazmanov
Team Valery Syutkin
Team Alexander Malinin
Team Igor Kornelyuk

Season	Premiere	Final	Winner	Runner-up	Third place		Winning coach	Presenter	Coaches (chair's order)			
Season	Premiere	Final	Winner	Runner-up	Third place		Winning coach	Presenter	1	2	3	4
1	September 14, 2018	October 5, 2018	Lidiya Muzaleva	Evgeny Strugalsky	Nikolay Arutyunov†	Sergey Manukyan	Pelageya	Dmitry Nagiev	Leonid	Pelageya	Lev	Valery M.
2	September 13, 2019	October 4, 2019	Leonid Sergienko	Yury Shivrin	Vladimir Gritsyk	Elena Gurilyova	Pelageya	Dmitry Nagiev	Lev	Pelageya	Valeriya	Mikhail
3	September 4, 2020	October 2, 2020	Dina Yudina	Pyotr Tarenkov	Irina Anikina	Tatyana Shupenya	Tamara Gverdtsiteli	Dmitry Nagiev	Lev	Tamara	Elena	Garik
4	September 3, 2021	October 1, 2021	Mikhail Serebryakov†	Evgeny Solomin	Andrey Mikhaylov	Pyotr Urbanovichus	Oleg Gazmanov	Dmitry Nagiev	Stas	Laima	Valery L.	Oleg
5	September 4, 2022	October 2, 2022	Raisa Dmitrenko	Viktor Zorin	Svetlana Ivanova	Alexander Rozhnikov	Elena Vaenga	Larisa Guzeeva	Valery S.	Alexander	Elena	Igor

=== Coaches' results ===
Coaches' results
Coach	Winner	Runner-up	Third place
Pelageya	2 times (1–2)	—	—
Elena Vaenga	Once (5)	—	Once (3)
Tamara Gverdtsiteli	Once (3)	—	—
Oleg Gazmanov	Once (4)	—	—
Lev Leshchenko	—	3 times (1–3)	—
Laima Vaikule	—	Once (4)	—
Igor Kornelyuk	—	Once (5)	—
Leonid Agutin	—	—	Once (1)
Valery Meladze	—	—	Once (1)
Valeriya	—	—	Once (2)
Mikhail Boyarsky	—	—	Once (2)
Garik Sukachov	—	—	Once (3)
Stas Namin	—	—	Once (4)
Valery Leontiev	—	—	Once (4)
Valeriy Syutkin	—	—	Once (5)
Alexander Malinin	—	—	Once (5)

== Best coach ==
Season	Best coach								
Season	First place	%	Second place	%	Third place		%	Fourth place	%
1	Pelageya	38%	Leonid Agutin	31%	Valery Meladze		16%	Lev Leshchenko	15%
2	In season 2 the public didn't determine the Best coach.								
3	Lev Leshchenko	31%	Elena Vaenga	25%	Garik Sukachov	Tamara Gverdtsiteli	22%	—	
4	Oleg Gazmanov	52%	Stas Namin	21%	Valery Leontiev		17%	Laima Vaikule	10%
5	Valeriy Syutkin	31%	Elena Vaenga	30%	Igor Kornelyuk		26%	Alexander Malinin	13%

== Reception ==
The Voice Senior (ratings) : Russia viewers per episode (millions)

Season	Episode number					Average
Season	1	2	3	4	5	Average
1	5.6	5.6	5.5	5.1	–	5.45
2	4.8	5.0	4.8	4.9	–	4.88
3	4.9	4.8	4.9	4.0	4.2	4.56

Source: MediaScope

=== Seasons average: Ratings ===
The first season premiered on September 14, 2018 with a 5.6 rating in the 18–49 demographic. For its average season rating, the show was in the Top 5 at a 5.45 ranking.

The second season premiered on September 13, 2019 with a 4.8 in the 18–49 demographic. It was down from last season's premiere by .8 rating scores.

The third season will premiere on September 4, 2020 with a 4.9 in the 18–49 demographic. It was up from last season's premiere by .1 rating scores.

Each Russian network television season starts in late August and ends in late May.

Season	Timeslot (UTC+3)	# Ep.	Premiered		Ended		TV season	Viewers (ratings)
Season	Timeslot (UTC+3)	# Ep.	Date	Premiere viewers (ratings)	Date	Final viewers (ratings)	TV season	Viewers (ratings)
1	Friday 9:30 pm	4	September 14, 2018	5.6	October 5, 2018	5.1	2018–2019	5.45
2	Friday 9:30 pm	4	September 13, 2019	4.8	October 4, 2019	4.9	2019–2020	4.88
3	Friday 9:30 pm	5	September 4, 2020	4.9	October 2, 2020	4.2	2020–2021	4.56
