= The Voice Senior (Russian TV series) season 5 =

The Voice Senior
- Season 5
- Presented by: Larisa Guzeeva
- Coaches: Valeriy Syutkin; Alexander Malinin; Elena Vaenga; Igor Kornelyuk
- Winner: Raisa Dmitrenko
- Winning coach: Elena Vaenga
- Runner-up: Viktor Zorin

Release
- Original network: Channel One
- Original release: September 4 – October 2, 2022

The fifth season talent show The Voice Senior (The Voice. 60+) premiered on September 2, 2022 on Channel One. Elena Vaenga returned as coach and replaced Laima Vaikule, while Valeriy Syutkin, Alexander Malinin, and Igor Kornelyuk replaced Stas Namin, Valery Leontiev, and Oleg Gazmanov, respectively. Larisa Guzeeva replaced Dmitry Nagiev as the show's presenter.

Raisa Dmitrenko was announced the winner on October 2, 2022, marking Elena Vaenga's first win as a coach and the third female coach to win in the show's history, behind Pelageya and Tamara Gverdtsiteli. Raisa became only the 2nd winner in the show's history to have been four-chair turn in the blind auditions after Mikhail Serebryakov in season 4.

Valeriy Syutkin became the Best Coach of the season with 31%. Interestingly, in the main version of the Voice, Syuktin took the last, 4th place, in seasons 8 and 9. Elena Vaenga, as in season 3, became the second.

== Coaches and presenter ==
The Voice Senior season 5 coaches and presenter

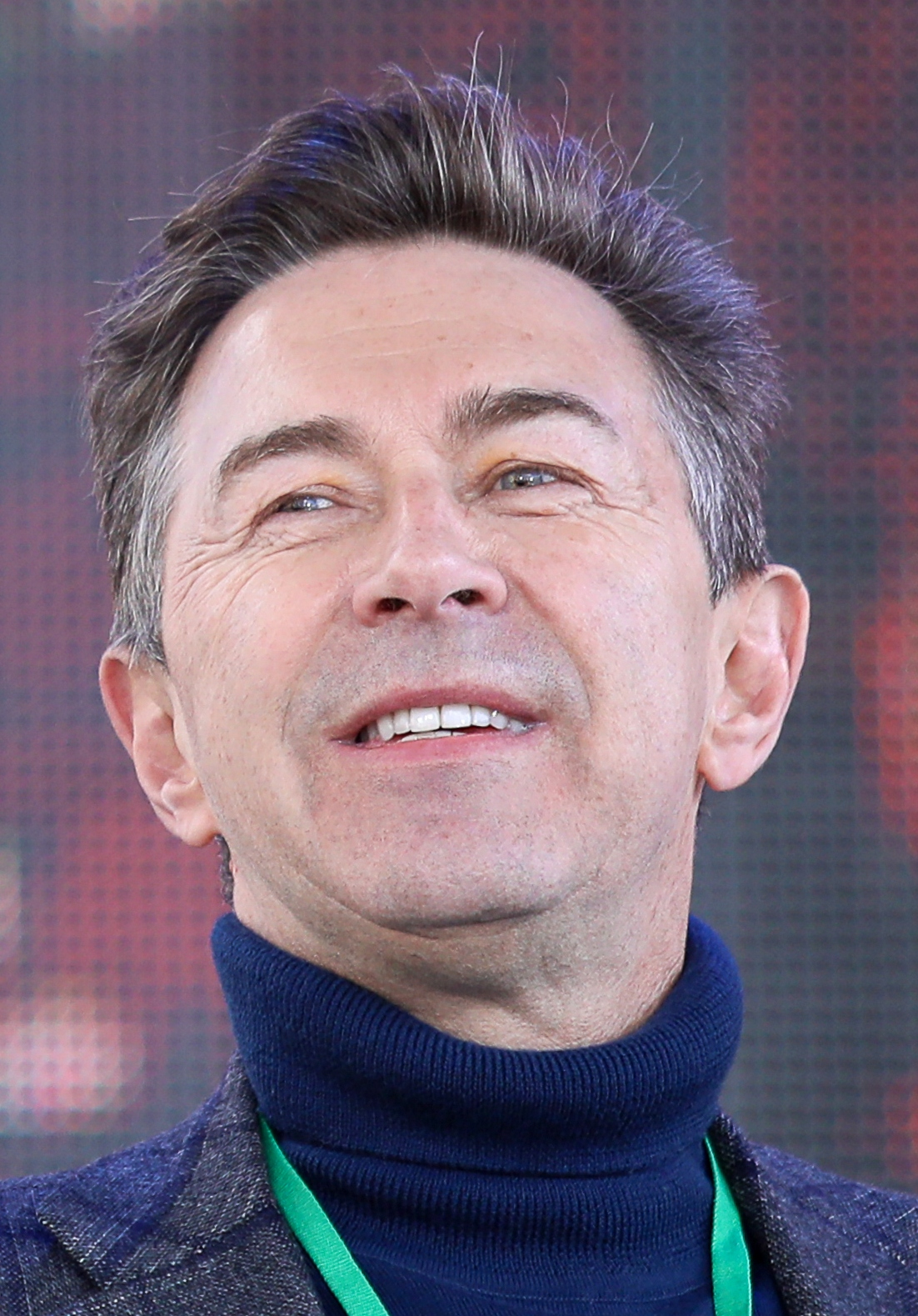
Valeriy Syutkin

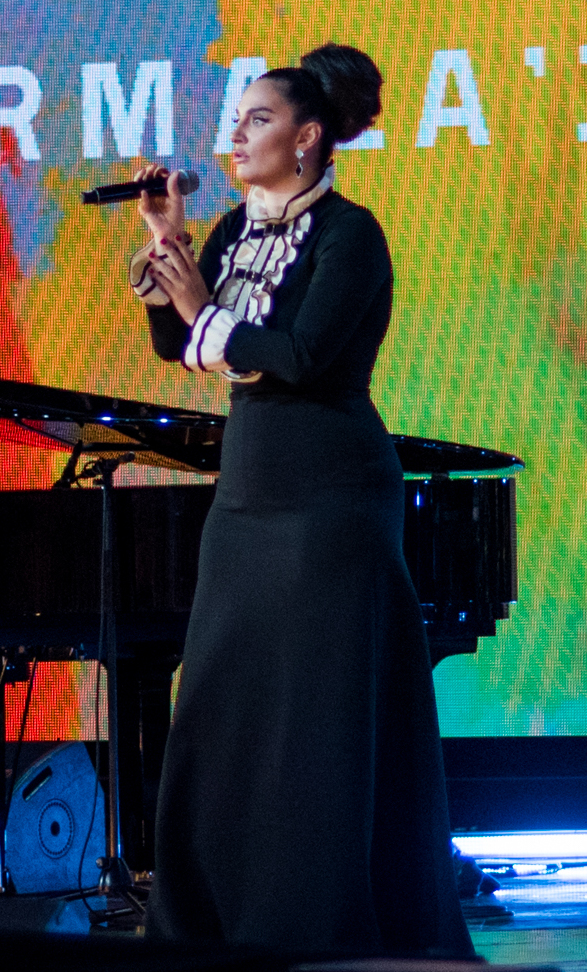
Elena Vaenga

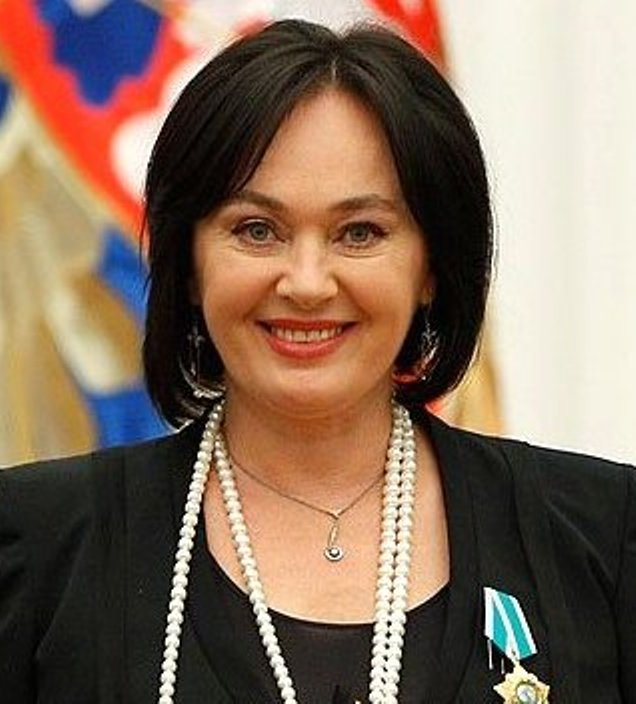
Larisa Guzeeva

Stas Namin, Laima Vaikule, Valery Leontiev, and Oleg Gazmanov didn't return for season five and were replaced by Valeriy Syutkin, Elena Vaenga, Alexander Malinin, and Igor Kornelyuk.

Larisa Guzeeva became as a presenter.

== Teams ==
Colour key

- Winner
- Runner-up
- Third place
- Eliminated in the Final
- Eliminated in the Knockout rounds

Coaches	Top 20 artists				
Valeriy Syutkin					
Valeriy Syutkin	Svetlana Ivanova	Alexey Kazakov	Oskar Sultanaliev	Olga Bibik	Vladimir Pribylov
Alexander Malinin					
Alexander Malinin	Alexander Rozhnikov	Mikhail Ryzhov	Vera Stromova	Vera Roskosh	Nodari Gviniashvili
Elena Vaenga					
Elena Vaenga	Raisa Dmitrenko	Larisa Solovyova	Nataliya Narakidze	Tamara Mikhalyova	Veronika Ilyanina
Igor Kornelyuk					
Igor Kornelyuk	Viktor Zorin	Sergey Shcherbakov	Olga Pushkina	Evgeny Oreshko	Irina Oskina

== Blind auditions ==
Colour key

✔	Coach pressed "I WANT YOU" button
✔	Coach pressed "I WANT YOU" button, even its team was already full
	Artist defaulted to a coach's team
	Artist picked a coach's team
	Artist eliminated with no coach pressing their button

The coaches performed "Дожди" at the start of the show.

Episode	Order	Artist	Age	Hometown	Song	Coach's and artist's choices			
Episode	Order	Artist	Age	Hometown	Song	Syutkin	Malinin	Vaenga	Kornelyuk
Episode 1 (Note: Valeriy Syutkin is The Best Coach of episode 1.) (September 2)
Episode 1 (September 2)	1	Valery Peshkin	67	Moscow	"Честно говоря"	—	—	—	—
Episode 1 (September 2)	2	Nataliya Narakidze	63	Kashira, Moscow Oblast	"Ягода-малина"	―	✔	✔	✔
Episode 1 (September 2)	3	Irik Ilyasov	78	Moscow	"Дрозды"	—	—	—	—
Episode 1 (September 2)	4	Svetlana Ivanova	61	Omsk	"Venus des abribus"	✔	✔	—	—
Episode 1 (September 2)	5	Natalya Mitroshina	60	Tashkent, Uzbekistan	"Ты, только ты"	—	—	—	—
Episode 1 (September 2)	6	Oskar Sultanaliev	65	Bishkek, Kyrgyzstan	"Sex Bomb"	✔	✔	✔	✔
Episode 1 (September 2)	7	Vera Stromova	64	Tambov	"Оттепель"	—	✔	—	—
Episode 1 (September 2)	8	Yury Kuznetsov	64	Moscow	"Пой, гитара"	—	—	—	—
Episode 1 (September 2)	9	Tamara Mikhalyova	83	Ulan-Ude	"Вечер на рейде"	✔	✔	✔	✔
Episode 1 (September 2)	10	Sergey Shcherbakov	65	Kirov	"Звон"	―	✔	―	✔
Episode 2 (Note: Valeriy Syutkin is The Best Coach of episode 2.) (September 11)	1	Alexey Kazakov	64	Moscow	"Venus"	✔	✔	✔	✔
Episode 2 (September 11)	2	Larisa Solovyova	61	Kuybyshev, Novosibirsk Oblast	"Ой, то не вечер"	―	✔	✔	―
Episode 2 (September 11)	3	Valery Unukovich	67	Luhansk, Ukraine	"Ходит песнка по кругу"	—	—	—	—
Episode 2 (September 11)	4	Olga Pushkina	60	Chelyabinsk	"Блюз любви"	✔	✔	―	✔
Episode 2 (September 11)	5	Valery Malakhov	70	Blagodarny, Stavropol Krai	"Случайный вальс"	—	—	—	—
Episode 2 (September 11)	6	Evgeny Oreshko	60	Sochi	"Зачарованная моя"	—	—	—	✔
Episode 2 (September 11)	7	Raisa Dmitrenko	73	Moscow	"All of Me"	✔	✔	✔	✔
Episode 2 (September 11)	8	Eduard Parfyonov	86	Moscow	"Тёмная ночь"	—	—	—	—
Episode 2 (September 11)	9	Vera Roskosh	68	Ekaterinburg	"Зимний сон"	―	✔	―	✔
Episode 2 (September 11)	10	Igor Tomilov	65	Perm	"Ноктюрн"	—	—	—	—
Episode 2 (September 11)	11	Alexander Rozhnikov	62	Lyubertsy, Moscow Oblast	"Белый лебедь на пруду"	✔	✔	✔	✔
Episode 3 (Note: Valeriy Syutkin is The Best Coach of episode 3.) (September 18)	1	Olga Bibik	68	Moscow	"Кони-звери"	✔	✔	―	―
Episode 3 (September 18)	2	Vladimir Pribylov	64	Oryol	"Come together"	✔	✔	―	✔
Episode 3 (September 18)	3	Oleg Andronov	85	Moscow	"Душечка"	Team full	—	—	—
Episode 3 (September 18)	4	Mikhail Ryzhov	60	Moscow	"Лабиринт"	Team full	✔	✔	✔
Episode 3 (September 18)	5	Oleg Tyan	64	Tashkent, Uzbekistan	"Parla piu piano"	Team full	—	—	—
Episode 3 (September 18)	6	Veronika Ilyanina	61	Ukhta, Komi	"Как за Доном, за рекой"	Team full	―	✔	―
Episode 3 (September 18)	7	Nodari Gviniashvili	68	Tkvarcheli, Georgia	"Мой город ― Тбилиси"	Team full	✔	Team full	―
Episode 3 (September 18)	8	Tatyana Marenko	69	Saint Petersburg	"Голубка"	Team full	Team full	Team full	―
Episode 3 (September 18)	9	Viktor Zorin	65	Ekaterinburg	"Есть глаза у цветов"	Team full	Team full	Team full	✔
Episode 3 (September 18)	10	Alexander Chernyaev	64	Moscow	"Have You Ever Seen the Rain?"	Team full	Team full	Team full	―
Episode 3 (September 18)	11	Irina Oskina	61	Sarov, Nizhny Novgorod Oblast	"Цвети, Земля моя"	✔	✔	✔	✔

== The Knockouts ==
Artist was saved by the Public's votes
Artist was eliminated

Episode	Coach	Order	Artist	Song	Result
Episode 4 (September 25) (Note: Elena Vaenga is The Best Coach of episode 4.)	Alexander Malinin	1	Nodar Gviniashvili	"Арго"	Eliminated
Episode 4 (September 25)	Alexander Malinin	2	Vera Stromova	"Домино"	Eliminated
Episode 4 (September 25)	Alexander Malinin	3	Mikhail Ryzhov	"Очарована, околдована"	Advanced
Episode 4 (September 25)	Alexander Malinin	4	Vera Roskosh	"Каникулы любви"	Eliminated
Episode 4 (September 25)	Alexander Malinin	5	Alexander Rozhnikov	"Я люблю тебя до слёз"	Advanced
Episode 4 (September 25)	Elena Vaenga	6	Veronika Ilyanina	"Ванюшка мой"	Eliminated
Episode 4 (September 25)	Elena Vaenga	7	Nataliya Narakidze	"Белой акации гроздья душистые"	Eliminated
Episode 4 (September 25)	Elena Vaenga	8	Larisa Solovyova	"Ай вы, цыгане"	Advanced
Episode 4 (September 25)	Elena Vaenga	9	Tamara Mikhalyova	"Вниз по Волге"	Eliminated
Episode 4 (September 25)	Elena Vaenga	10	Raisa Dmitrenko	"Романс"	Advanced
Episode 4 (September 25)	Valeriy Syutkin	11	Oskar Sultanaliev	"Мой друг (лучше всех играет блюз)"	Eliminated
Episode 4 (September 25)	Valeriy Syutkin	12	Olga Bibik	"На тот большак"	Eliminated
Episode 4 (September 25)	Valeriy Syutkin	13	Vladimir Pribylov	"Аэропорт"	Eliminated
Episode 4 (September 25)	Valeriy Syutkin	14	Svetlana Ivanova	"По полюшку"	Advanced
Episode 4 (September 25)	Valeriy Syutkin	15	Alexey Kazakov	"Вот так папа пел"	Advanced
Episode 4 (September 25)	Igor Kornelyuk	16	Irina Oskina	"Просто"	Eliminated
Episode 4 (September 25)	Igor Kornelyuk	17	Sergey Shcherbakov	"Завушнiцы"	Advanced
Episode 4 (September 25)	Igor Kornelyuk	18	Olga Pushkina	"Оранжевая песня"	Eliminated
Episode 4 (September 25)	Igor Kornelyuk	19	Evgeny Oreshko	"Симона"	Eliminated
Episode 4 (September 25)	Igor Kornelyuk	20	Viktor Zorin	"Офицеры"	Advanced

== Final ==
Colour key

Artist was saved by the Public's votes
Artist was eliminated

Episode	Coach	Order	Artist	Song	Public's vote	Result
Episode 5 (October, 2)
Episode 5 (October, 2)	Final					
Episode 5 (October, 2)	Valeriy Syutkin	1	Alexey Kazakov	"Есть только миг"	30%	Eliminated
Episode 5 (October, 2)	Valeriy Syutkin	2	Svetlana Ivanova	"Озеро надежды"	70%	Advanced
Episode 5 (October, 2)	Alexander Malinin	3	Mikhail Ryzhov	"Confessa"	48%	Eliminated
Episode 5 (October, 2)	Alexander Malinin	4	Alexander Rozhnikov	"Горький мёд"	52%	Advanced
Episode 5 (October, 2)	Elena Vaenga	5	Larisa Solovyova	"Обыкновенный"	28%	Eliminated
Episode 5 (October, 2)	Elena Vaenga	6	Raisa Dmitrenko	"Hit the Road Jack"	72%	Advanced
Episode 5 (October, 2)	Igor Kornelyuk	7	Sergey Shcherbakov	"Школьный бал"	30,5%	Eliminated
Episode 5 (October, 2)	Igor Kornelyuk	8	Viktor Zorin	"Город, которого нет"	69,5%	Advanced
Episode 5 (October, 2)	Super Final					
Episode 5 (October, 2)	Valeriy Syutkin	1	Svetlana Ivanova	"Зурбаган"	Third place	
Episode 5 (October, 2)	Alexander Malinin	2	Alexander Rozhnikov	"Радовать"	Third place	
Episode 5 (October, 2)	Elena Vaenga	3	Raisa Dmitrenko	"Песнь о солдате"	62,3%	Winner
Episode 5 (October, 2)	Igor Kornelyuk	4	Viktor Zorin	"Вечная любовь"	37,7%	Runner-up

== Best Coach ==
Colour key

- Best Coach
- Second place
- Third place
- Fourth place
- Episode's Best Coach

Coach	Public's vote _{(per episode)}					Result
Coach	#1	#2	#3	#4	Av.	Result
Valeriy Syutkin	31%	34%	31%	29%	31%	Best coach
Elena Vaenga	30%	26%	30%	35%	30%	Second place
Igor Kornelyuk	27%	28%	25%	22%	26%	Third place
Alexander Malinin	12%	12%	14%	14%	13%	Fourth place
