= The Voice Senior (Russian TV series) season 2 =

The Voice Senior
- Season 2
- Presented by: Dmitry Nagiev
- Coaches: Lev Leshchenko; Pelageya; Valeriya; Mikhail Boyarsky
- Winner: Leonid Sergienko
- Winning coach: Pelageya
- Runner-up: Yury Shivrin

Release
- Original network: Channel One
- Original release: September 13 – October 4, 2019

Season chronology
- ← Previous; Season 1 Next → Season 3

The second season of the Russian reality talent show The Voice Senior (The Voice. 60+) premiered on September 13, 2019 on Channel One. Dmitry Nagiev returned as the show's presenter for his second seasons in a row. Lev Leshchenko and Pelageya returned as coaches for their second season in a row, Valeriya and Mikhail Boyarsky replaced Leonid Agutin and Valery Meladze and became a new coach's in the show.

Leonid Sergienko was announced the winner on October 4, 2019, marking Pelageya's second win as a coach, thus expanding her winning streak to two seasons in a row. This also makes Pelageya the first female coach to win more than one season.

There was no voting for the Best Coach.

== Coaches and presenter ==
The Voice Senior season 2 coaches and presenter

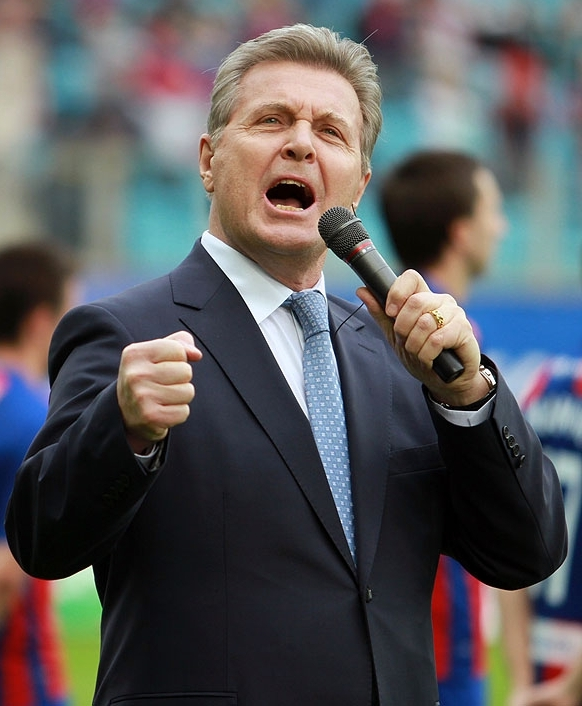
Lev Leshchenko

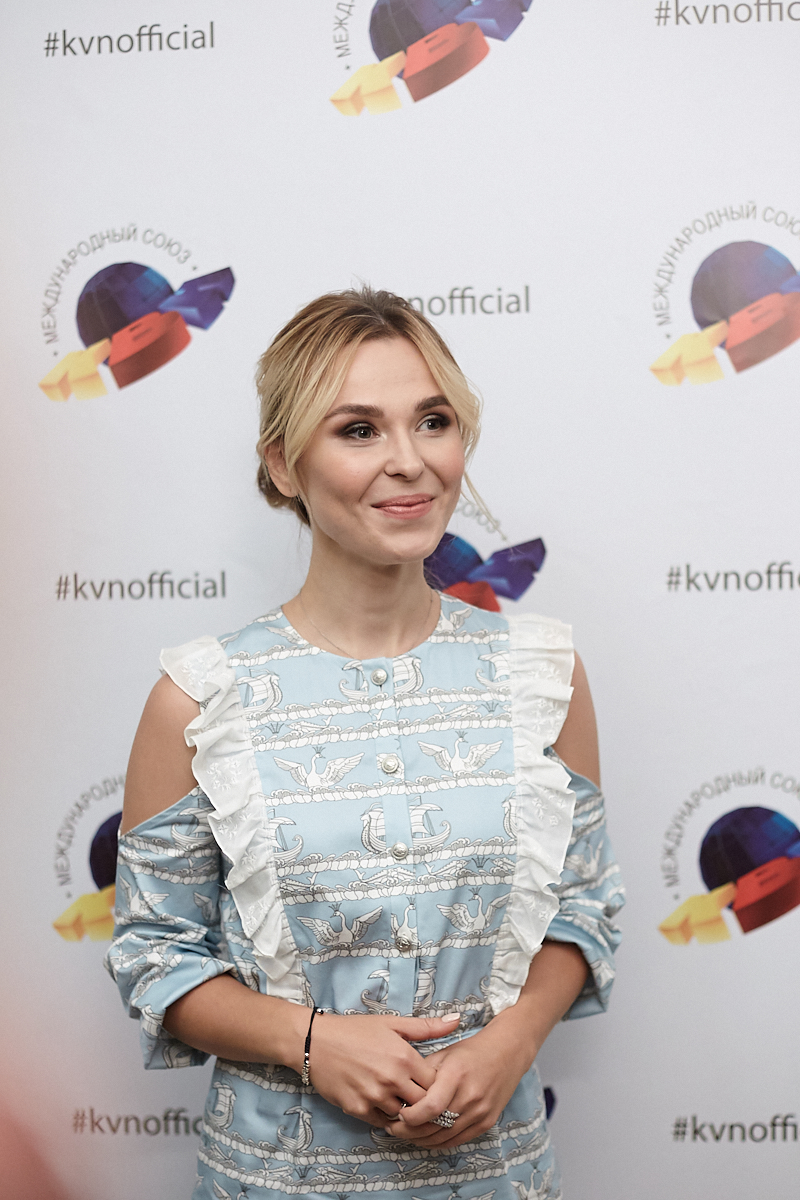
Pelageya

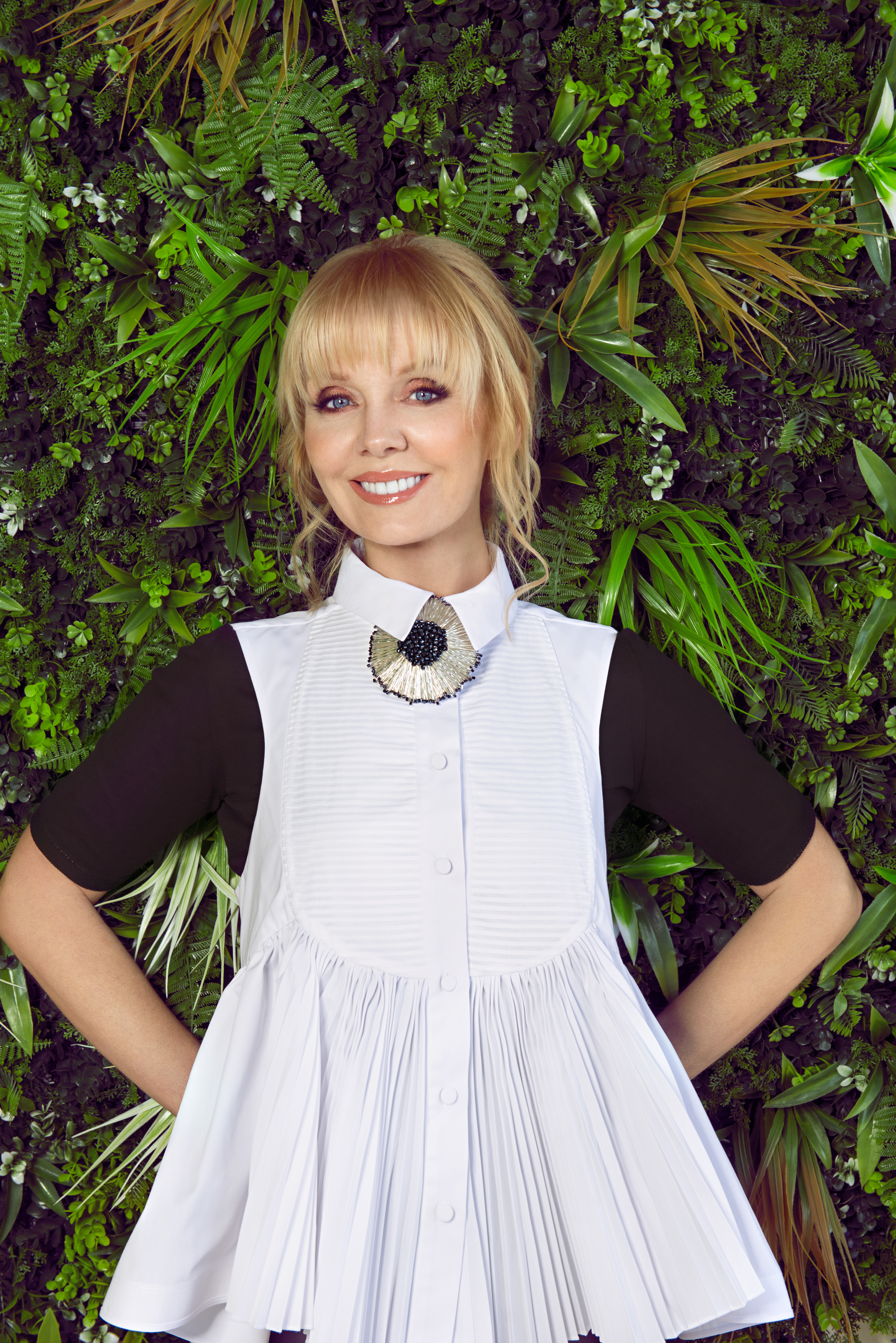
Valeriya

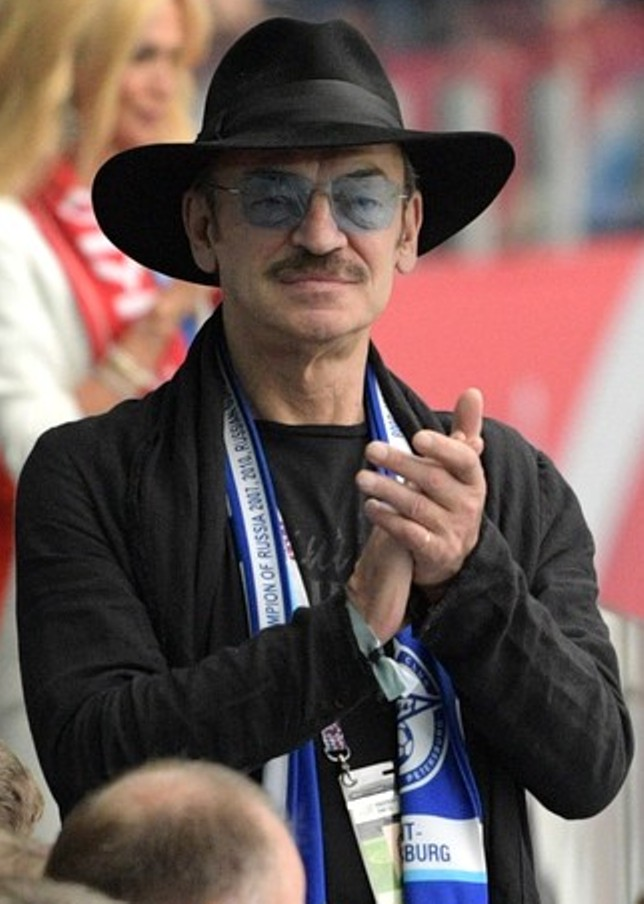
Mikhail Boyarsky

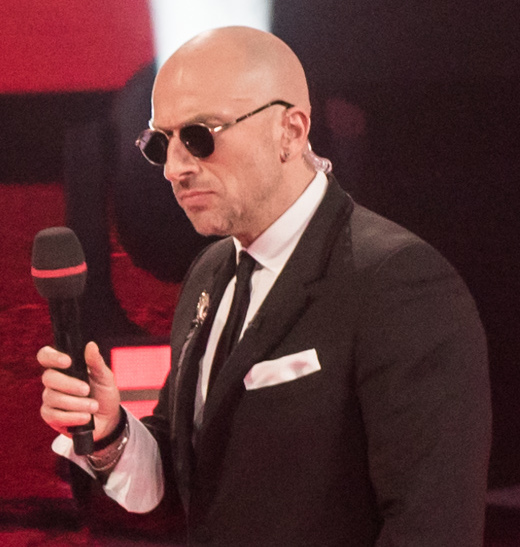
Dmitry Nagiev

Lev Leshchenko and Pelageya returned as coaches for their 2nd season in a row. Leonid Agutin and Valery Meladze did not return for season two and were replaced by Valeriya and Mikhail Boyarsky, thus making it the first season to have two female coaches.

Dmitry Nagiev also returned as a presenter.

== Teams ==
Colour key

- Winner
- Runner-up
- Third place
- Eliminated in the Final
- Eliminated in the Knockout rounds

Coaches	Top 16 artists			
Lev Leshchenko				
Lev Leshchenko	Yury Shivrin	Olga & Galina Bogdanovy	Irina Nizhegorodtseva	Andrey Lysikov
Pelageya				
Pelageya	Leonid Sergienko	Mikhail Ryzhov	Anatoly Alyoshin	Dmitry Usik
Valeriya				
Valeriya	Vladimir Gritsyk	Lyudmila Pakhomova	Oleg Sleptsov	Alexander Shans
Mikhail Boyarsky				
Mikhail Boyarsky	Elena Gurilyova	Vladimir Laptev	Vladislav Zuev	Igor Afanasyev

== Blind auditions ==
Colour key

✔	Coach pressed "I WANT YOU" button
✔	Coach pressed "I WANT YOU" button, despite the lack of places in his/her team
	Artist defaulted to a coach's team
	Artist picked a coach's team
	Artist eliminated with no coach pressing their button

The coaches performed "Поворот" at the start of the show.

Episode	Order	Artist	Age	Hometown	Song	Coach's and artist's choices			
Episode	Order	Artist	Age	Hometown	Song	Leshchenko	Pelageya	Valeriya	Boyarsky
Episode 1 (September 13, 2019)	1	Andrey Lysikov	65	Kunashir, Sakhalin oblast / Moscow	"Just a Gigolo"	✔	✔	✔	✔
Episode 1 (September 13, 2019)	2	Mikhail Ryzhov	80	Vyazemka, Penza oblast	"Что так сердце растревожено"	—	✔	—	—
Episode 1 (September 13, 2019)	3	Elena Gurilyova	68	Moscow	"Белой акации гроздья душистые"	—	—	—	✔
Episode 1 (September 13, 2019)	4	Vladimir Gritsyk	66	Severouralsk, Sverdlovsk oblast / Moscow	"Blue Skies"	—	—	✔	—
Episode 1 (September 13, 2019)	5	Irina Khanukaeva-Riksgens	68	Makhachkala / Düsseldorf, Germany	"Гитара"	—	—	—	—
Episode 1 (September 13, 2019)	6	Oleg Sleptsov	65	Moscow	"Kiss"	✔	✔	✔	✔
Episode 1 (September 13, 2019)	7	Vladimir Sapuntsov	69	Moscow	"На далёкой Амазонке"	—	—	—	—
Episode 1 (September 13, 2019)	8	Lyudmila Pakhomova	91	Aprelevka, Moscow oblast	"Немножко о себе"	—	—	✔	✔
Episode 1 (September 13, 2019)	9	Vladimir Laptev	73	Vladimir	"Маленький креольчик"	—	—	—	✔
Episode 1 (September 13, 2019)	10	Inna Bednykh	61	Saint Petersburg	"I Want to Break Free"	—	—	—	—
Episode 1 (September 13, 2019)	11	Yury Shivrin	61	Perm / Moscow	"My Way"	✔	—	—	—
Episode 2 (September 20, 2019)	1	Olga & Galina Bogdanovy	64/65	Kazan	"Лодочка"	✔	✔	—	—
Episode 2 (September 20, 2019)	2	Vladislav Zuev	65	Saint Petersburg	"Ain't Misbehavin'"	—	—	—	✔
Episode 2 (September 20, 2019)	3	Leonid Sergienko	69	Makiivka, Ukraine	"Ах ты, душечка"	—	✔	—	—
Episode 2 (September 20, 2019)	4	Irina Nizhegorodtseva	61	Moscow	"I Put a Spell on You"	✔	—	✔	—
Episode 2 (September 20, 2019)	5	Yury Tsenin	89	Moscow	"Осень"	Team full	—	—	—
Episode 2 (September 20, 2019)	6	Alexander Shans	72	Moscow	"Unchain My Heart"	Team full	—	✔	—
Episode 2 (September 20, 2019)	7	Nina Tartakovskaya	77	Moscow	"На побывку едет"	Team full	—	Team full	—
Episode 2 (September 20, 2019)	8	Anatoly Alyoshin	70	Moscow / New York City, United States	"Сумасшедший дождь"	Team full	✔	Team full	—
Episode 2 (September 20, 2019)	9	Alexander Subbotin	64	Oryol	"Ой, заря, моя зоренька"	Team full	—	Team full	—
Episode 2 (September 20, 2019)	10	Igor Afanasyev	61	Moscow	"La navi del olvido"	Team full	—	Team full	✔
Episode 2 (September 20, 2019)	11	Dmitry Usik	87	Verknyi Saltiv, Ukraine / Moscow	"Одинокая гармонь"	✔	✔	✔	✔

== The Knockouts ==
The top 8 contestants then moved on to the Finale.

Colour key

Artist was saved by the Public's votes
Artist was eliminated

Episode	Coach	Order	Artist	Song	Result
Episode 3 (September 27, 2019)	Lev Leshchenko	1	Olga and Galina Bogdanovy	"Каникулы любви"	Advanced
Episode 3 (September 27, 2019)	Lev Leshchenko	2	Yury Shivrin	"Чистые пруды"	Advanced
Episode 3 (September 27, 2019)	Lev Leshchenko	3	Irina Nizhegorodtseva	"Sweet Dreams"	Eliminated
Episode 3 (September 27, 2019)	Lev Leshchenko	4	Andrey Lysikov	"Living Next Door to Alice"	Eliminated
Episode 3 (September 27, 2019)	Pelageya	5	Dmitry Usik	"Прощайте, скалистые горы"	Eliminated
Episode 3 (September 27, 2019)	Pelageya	6	Mikhail Ryzhov	"Где же вы теперь, друзья-однополчане?"	Advanced
Episode 3 (September 27, 2019)	Pelageya	7	Anatoly Alyoshin	"Один взгляд назад"	Eliminated
Episode 3 (September 27, 2019)	Pelageya	8	Leonid Sergienko	"Як не хочеш моє серце"	Advanced
Episode 3 (September 27, 2019)	Valeriya	9	Oleg Sleptsov	"Листья жёлтые"	Eliminated
Episode 3 (September 27, 2019)	Valeriya	10	Alexander Shans	"Нет тебя прекрасней"	Eliminated
Episode 3 (September 27, 2019)	Valeriya	11	Lyudmila Pakhomova	"Песенка о капитане"	Advanced
Episode 3 (September 27, 2019)	Valeriya	12	Vladimir Gritsyk	"Текила-любовь"	Advanced
Episode 3 (September 27, 2019)	Mikhail Boyarsky	13	Vladimir Laptev	"Над розовым морем"	Advanced
Episode 3 (September 27, 2019)	Mikhail Boyarsky	14	Elena Gurilyova	"Голубка"	Advanced
Episode 3 (September 27, 2019)	Mikhail Boyarsky	15	Vladislav Zuev	"Тихая вода (Chicha woda)"	Eliminated
Episode 3 (September 27, 2019)	Mikhail Boyarsky	16	Igor Afanasyev	"Вечная любовь"	Eliminated

== Live Final ==
Colour key

Artist was saved by the Public's votes
Artist was eliminated

Episode	Coach	Order	Artist	Song	Public's vote	Result
Episode 4 (October 4, 2019)
Episode 4 (October 4, 2019)	Final					
Episode 4 (October 4, 2019)	Mikhail Boyarsky	1	Vladimir Laptev	"Дружба"	14%	Eliminated
Episode 4 (October 4, 2019)	Mikhail Boyarsky	2	Elena Gurilyova	"Мишка"	86%	Advanced
Episode 4 (October 4, 2019)	Pelageya	3	Leonid Sergienko	"Спят курганы тёмные"	57.9%	Advanced
Episode 4 (October 4, 2019)	Pelageya	4	Mikhail Ryzhov	"Кони-звери	42.1%	Eliminated
Episode 4 (October 4, 2019)	Lev Leshchenko	5	Olga and Galina Bogdanovy	"Проводы"	17.3%	Eliminated
Episode 4 (October 4, 2019)	Lev Leshchenko	6	Yury Shivrin	"Я люблю тебя, Россия"	82.7%	Advanced
Episode 4 (October 4, 2019)	Valeriya	7	Vladimir Gritsyk	"Музыкант"	52.8%	Advanced
Episode 4 (October 4, 2019)	Valeriya	8	Lyudmila Pakhomova	"Дорогой длинною"	47.2%	Eliminated
Episode 4 (October 4, 2019)	Super Final					
Episode 4 (October 4, 2019)	Mikhail Boyarsky	1	Elena Gurilyova	"Дорогие мои москвичи"	Third place	
Episode 4 (October 4, 2019)	Pelageya	2	Leonid Sergienko	"Живёт моя отрада"	70.1%	Winner
Episode 4 (October 4, 2019)	Lev Leshchenko	3	Yury Shivrin	"Ария Мистера Х"	29.9%	Runner-up
Episode 4 (October 4, 2019)	Valeriya	4	Vladimir Gritsyk	"Единственная"	Third place	

Non-competition performances
Order	Performer	Song
4.1	Mikhail Boyarsky & Lev Leshchenko	"Городские цветы"
4.2	All finalists and Coaches	"Поворот"

== Reception ==
=== Rating ===
Episode		Original airdate	Production	Time slot (UTC+3)	Audience		Source
Episode		Original airdate	Production	Time slot (UTC+3)	Rating	Share	Source
1	"The Blind Auditions Premiere"	September 13, 2019	201	Friday 9:30 p.m.	4.8	18.8	
2	"The Blind Auditions, Part 2"	September 20, 2019	202	Friday 9:30 p.m.	5.0	18.6	
3	"The Knockouts"	September 27, 2019	203	Friday 9:30 p.m.	4.8	18.5	
4	"Live Final"	October 4, 2019	204	Friday 9:30 p.m.	4.8	18.5	
