= The Voice Senior (Russian TV series) season 1 =

The Voice Senior
- Season 1
- Presented by: Dmitry Nagiev
- Coaches: Leonid Agutin; Pelageya; Lev Leshchenko; Valery Meladze
- Winner: Lidiya Muzalyova
- Winning coach: Pelageya
- Runner-up: Evgeny Strugalsky

Release
- Original network: Channel One
- Original release: September 14 – October 5, 2018

Season chronology
- Next → Season 2

The first season of the Russian reality talent show The Voice Senior (The Voice. 60+) premiered on September 14, 2018 on Channel One. Dmitry Nagiev became the show's presenter. Leonid Agutin, Pelageya, Lev Leshchenko and Valery Meladze became the coaches in the premiere season.

Lidiya Muzalyova was announced the winner on October 5, 2018, marking Pelageya's first win as a coach and the first female coach to win in the show's history. Also Pelageya became the first coach in the history of the Russian Voice who won more than one version of the show, winning the fifth season of The Voice Kids in April, 2018.

For the first time in the history of the Voice franchise, viewers could choose the Best Coach using The Voice App and HbbTV option in their TV sets. Voting was conducted in all episodes except the Final. Pelageya became the Best Coach with 38%.

== Coaches and presenter ==
The Voice Senior season 1 coaches and presenter

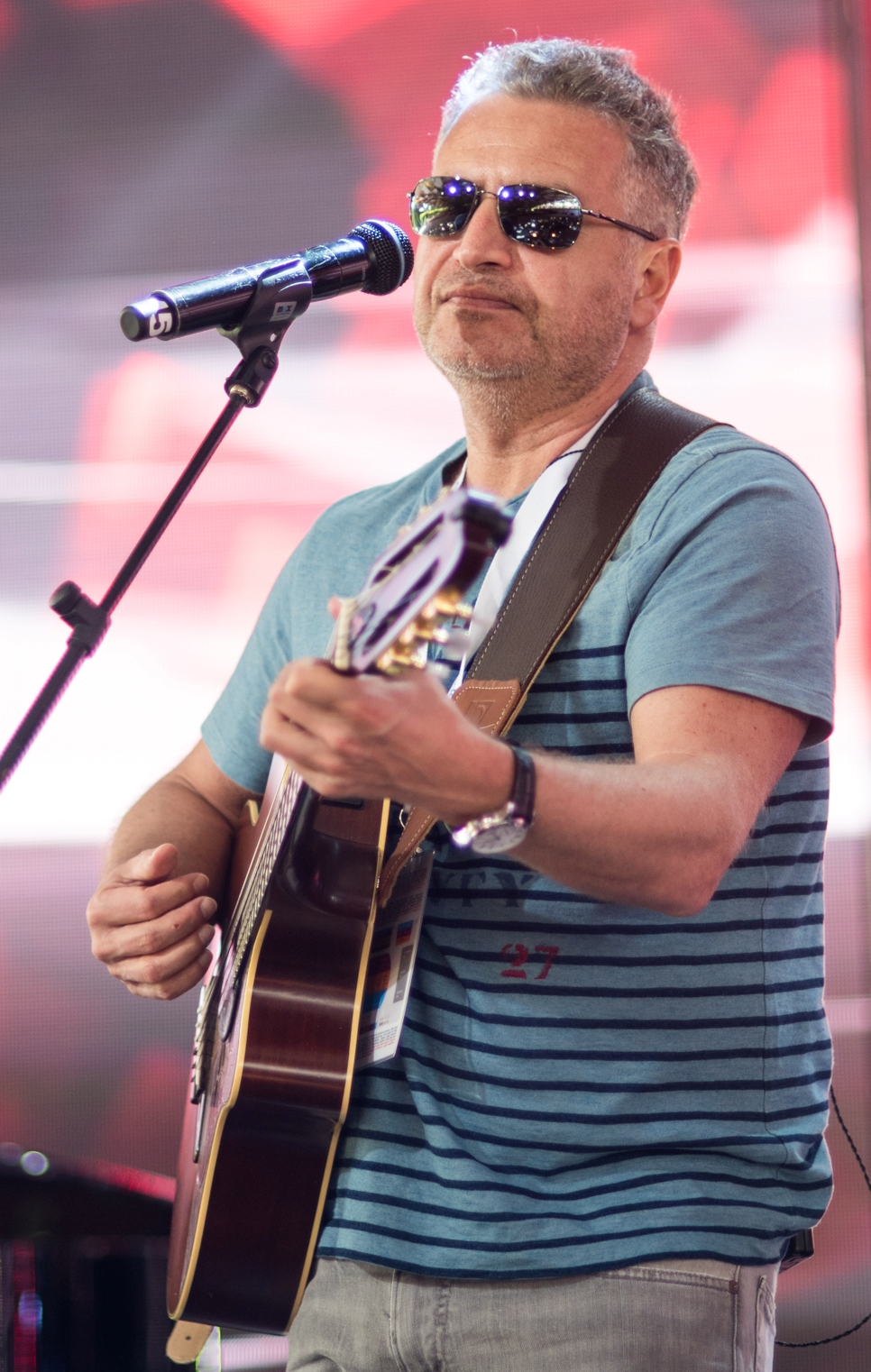
Leonid Agutin

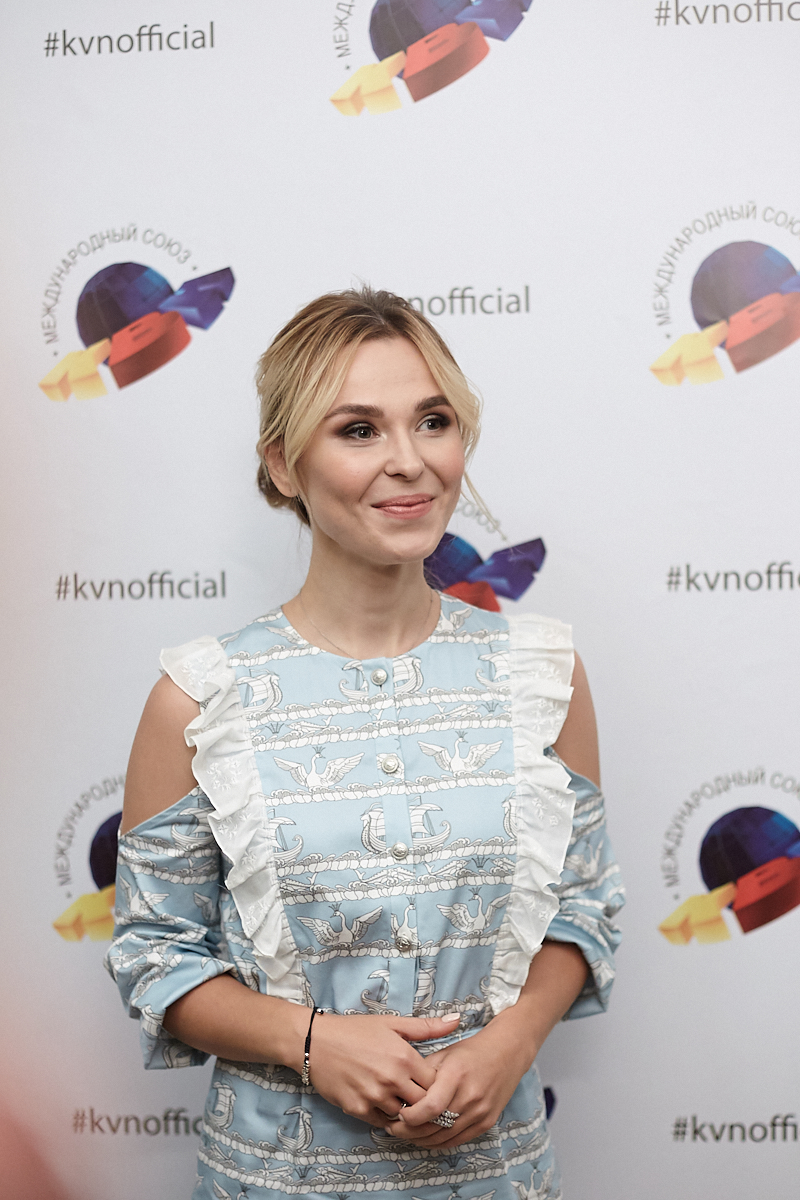
Pelageya

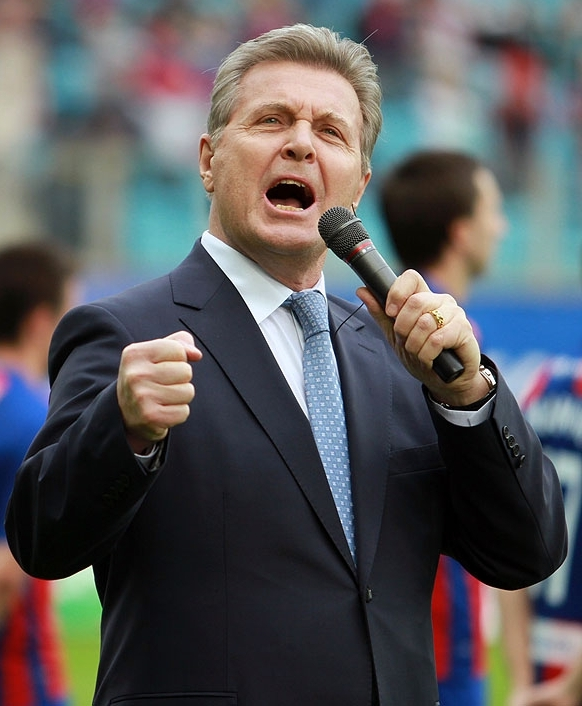
Lev Leshchenko

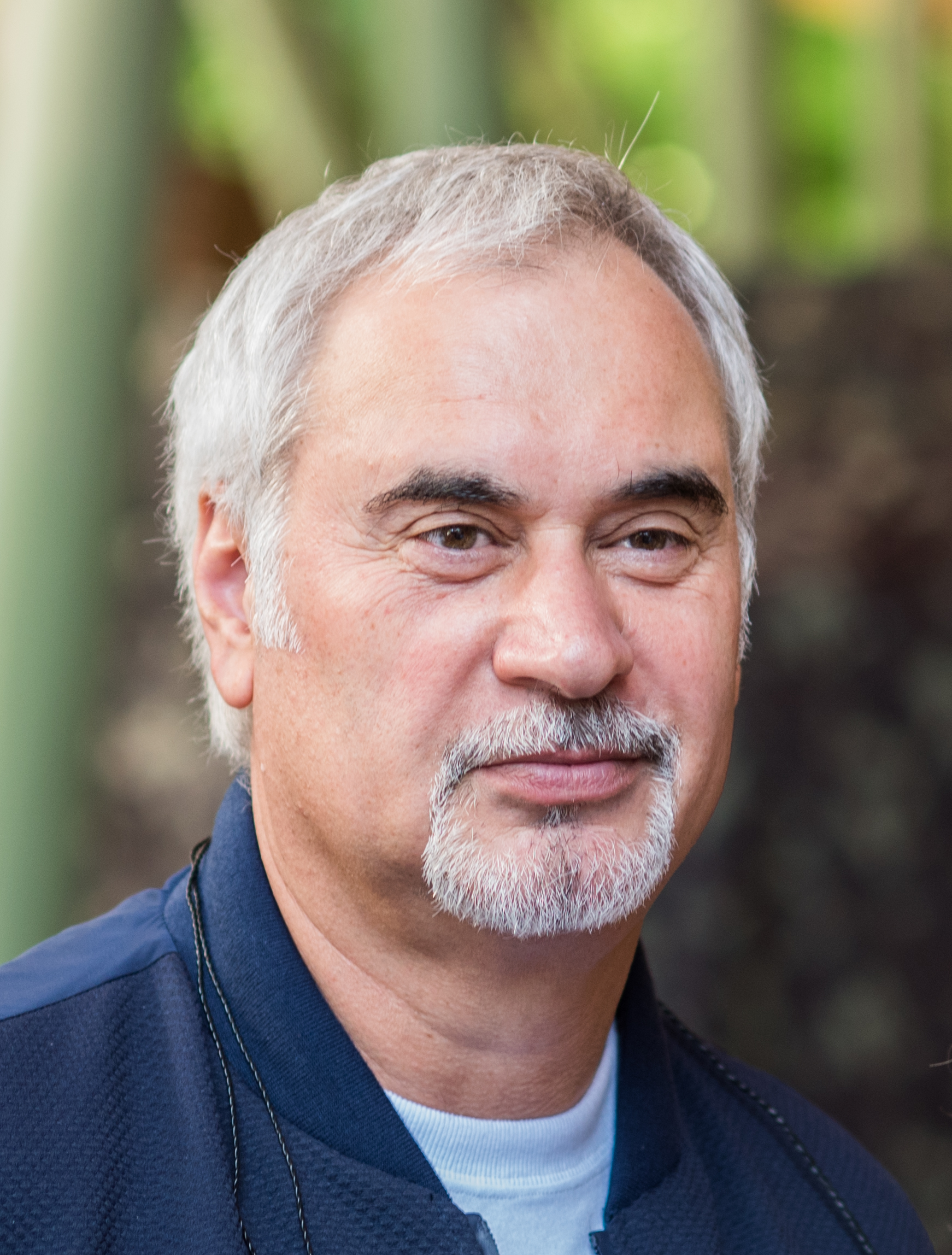
Valery Meladze

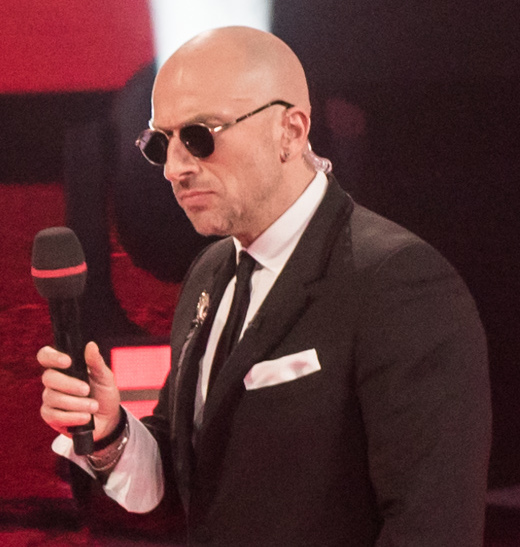
Dmitry Nagiev

Leonid Agutin, Pelageya and Valery Meladze became the first confirmed coaches on August 13, 2018, followed by Lev Leshchenko on August 14, 2018.

Dmitry Nagiev became the show's presenter.

== Teams ==
Colour key

- Winner
- Runner-up
- Third place
- Eliminated in the Final
- Eliminated in the Knockout rounds

Coaches	Top 17 artists				
Leonid Agutin					
Leonid Agutin	Nikolay Arutyunov	Nikolay Agutin	Andrey Kosinsky	Alexander Evdokimov	
Pelageya					
Pelageya	Lidiya Muzalyova	Olga Muravina	Sergey Kurzanov	Oleg Pastukhov	Nataliya Butusova
Lev Leshchenko					
Lev Leshchenko	Evgeny Strugalsky	Viktor Zuev	Mansur Tashmatov	Navruz Akhmedov	
Valery Meladze					
Valery Meladze	Sergey Manukyan	Nataliya Spevak	Gennady Kim	Sergey Pivovarenok	

== Blind auditions ==
Colour key

✔	Coach pressed "I WANT YOU" button
✔	Coach pressed "I WANT YOU" button, despite the lack of places in his/her team
	Coach pressed "I WANT YOU" button, despite the lack of places in his/her team, and artist picked a coach's team
	Artist defaulted to a coach's team
	Artist picked a coach's team
	Artist eliminated with no coach pressing their button

The coaches performed "Жизнь" at the start of the show.

Episode	Order	Artist	Age	Hometown	Song	Coach's and artist's choices			
Episode	Order	Artist	Age	Hometown	Song	Agutin	Pelageya	Leshchenko	Meladze
Episode 1 (Note: Pelageya is The Best Coach of episode 1.) (September 14, 2018)	1	Sergey Kurzanov	64	Balashikha, Moscow oblast	"Johnny B. Goode"	—	✔	✔	✔
Episode 1 (September 14, 2018)	2	Nataliya Spevak	67	Saratov	"I Know Why"	—	—	—	✔
Episode 1 (September 14, 2018)	3	Oleg Pastukhov	60	Vladivostok	"Вечерний звон"	✔	✔	✔	✔
Episode 1 (September 14, 2018)	4	Raisa Abdukhanova	71	Moscow	"Не уходи (Осень)"	—	—	—	—
Episode 1 (September 14, 2018)	5	Gennady Kim	62	Sakhalin Oblast / Moscow	"Confessa"	—	—	✔	✔
Episode 1 (September 14, 2018)	6	Evgeny Strugalskiy	80	Moscow	"Ты и эта гитара"	—	—	✔	—
Episode 1 (September 14, 2018)	7	Nataliya Butusova	61	Volgograd	"Simply the Best"	—	✔	—	—
Episode 1 (September 14, 2018)	8	Sergey Shtyrov	61	Moscow	"Дорогие мои, москвичи"	—	—	—	—
Episode 1 (September 14, 2018)	9	Sergey Manukyan	63	Moscow	"Can't Buy Me Love"	✔	✔	✔	✔
Episode 1 (September 14, 2018)	10	Irena Ginzburg-Zhurbina	68	Moscow	"Лошадка-жизнь"	—	—	—	—
Episode 1 (September 14, 2018)	11	Andrey Kosinsky	61	Petergof, Saint Petersburg	"Virtual Insanity"	✔	—	—	—
Episode 2 (Note: Pelageya is The Best Coach of episode 2.) (September 21, 2018)	1	Mansur Tashmatov	64	Tashkent, Uzbekistan	"Sex Bomb"	—	—	✔	—
Episode 2 (September 21, 2018)	2	Lidiya Muzalyova	62	Obninsk, Kaluga oblast	"Оренбургский пуховый платок"	—	✔	✔	—
Episode 2 (September 21, 2018)	3	Nikolay Arutyunov	60	Moscow	"Mercedes Benz"	✔	✔	✔	✔
Episode 2 (September 21, 2018)	4	Viktor Zuev	63	Saint Petersburg	"Come vorrei"	—	Team full	✔	—
Episode 2 (September 21, 2018)	5	Vera Kharchenko	79	Moscow	"Только раз бывает в жизни встреча"	—	Team full	—	—
Episode 2 (September 21, 2018)	6	Nikolay Agutin (Note: Nikolay Agutin is the Leonid Agutin's father.)	83	Moscow	"Я работаю волшебником"	✔	Team full	—	—
Episode 2 (September 21, 2018)	7	Alexander Evdokimov	66	Tver	"Где же ты была"	✔	Team full	✔	—
Episode 2 (September 21, 2018)	8	Boris Pogodin	79	Veliky Novgorod	"Тайна"	Team full	Team full	—	—
Episode 2 (September 21, 2018)	9	Natalya Nurmukhamedova	67	Tashkent, Uzbekistan	"Smooth Seiling"	Team full	Team full	—	—
Episode 2 (September 21, 2018)	10	Olga Muravina	77	Moscow	"Я танцевать хочу"	Team full	✔	✔	—
Episode 2 (September 21, 2018)	11	Sergey Pivovarenok	61	Yugorsk, Yugra	"Эти глаза напротив"	Team full	Team full	—	✔
Episode 2 (September 21, 2018)	12	Navruz Akhmedov	60	Moscow	"Не лукавьте"	Team full	Team full	✔	Team full

== The Knockouts ==
The top 8 contestants then moved on to the Final.

Colour key

Artist was saved by the Public's votes
Artist was eliminated

Episode	Coach	Order	Artist	Song	Result
Episode 3 (September 28, 2018) (Note: Pelageya is The Best Coach of episode 3.)	Valery Meladze	1	Sergey Pivovarenok	"Вечная весна"	Eliminated
Episode 3 (September 28, 2018)	Valery Meladze	2	Gennady Kim	"Come Together"	Eliminated
Episode 3 (September 28, 2018)	Valery Meladze	3	Nataliya Spevak	"Звать любовь не надо"	Advanced
Episode 3 (September 28, 2018)	Valery Meladze	4	Sergey Manukyan	"All of Me"	Advanced
Episode 3 (September 28, 2018)	Pelageya	5	Sergey Kurzanov	"Слепили бабу на морозе"	Eliminated
Episode 3 (September 28, 2018)	Pelageya	6	Olga Muravina	"Гори, гори, моя звезда"	Advanced
Episode 3 (September 28, 2018)	Pelageya	7	Lidiya Muzalyova	"Верила, верила верю"	Advanced
Episode 3 (September 28, 2018)	Pelageya	8	Oleg Pastukhov	"Jamaica"	Eliminated
Episode 3 (September 28, 2018)	Pelageya	9	Nataliya Butusova	"Не обижай меня"	Eliminated
Episode 3 (September 28, 2018)	Lev Leshchenko	10	Mansur Tashmatov	"Ах, эта девушка"	Eliminated
Episode 3 (September 28, 2018)	Lev Leshchenko	11	Viktor Zuev	"Buona Sera Signorina"	Advanced
Episode 3 (September 28, 2018)	Lev Leshchenko	12	Evgeny Strugalsky	"Три года ты мне снилась"	Advanced
Episode 3 (September 28, 2018)	Lev Leshchenko	13	Navruz Akhmedov	"Серенада Рикардо"	Eliminated
Episode 3 (September 28, 2018)	Leonid Agutin	14	Andrey Kosinsky	"Я не умею танцевать"	Eliminated
Episode 3 (September 28, 2018)	Leonid Agutin	15	Alexander Evdokimov	"Fantasy"	Eliminated
Episode 3 (September 28, 2018)	Leonid Agutin	16	Nikolay Agutin	"Мама"	Advanced
Episode 3 (September 28, 2018)	Leonid Agutin	17	Nikolay Arutyunov	"Can't Find a Reason"	Advanced

== Live Final ==
Colour key

Artist was saved by the Public's votes
Artist was eliminated

Episode	Coach	Order	Artist	Song	Public's vote	Result
Episode 4 (October 5, 2018)
Episode 4 (October 5, 2018)	Final					
Episode 4 (October 5, 2018)	Valery Meladze	1	Sergey Manukyan	"Старый клён"	71.1%	Advanced
Episode 4 (October 5, 2018)	Valery Meladze	2	Nataliya Spevak	"Autumn Leaves"	28.9%	Eliminated
Episode 4 (October 5, 2018)	Lev Leshchenko	3	Evgeny Strugalsky	"Случайный вальс"	67.4%	Advanced
Episode 4 (October 5, 2018)	Lev Leshchenko	4	Viktor Zuev	"What a Wonderful World"	32.6%	Eliminated
Episode 4 (October 5, 2018)	Pelageya	5	Lidiya Muzalyova	"Пой, звени, моя гитара"	60.5%	Advanced
Episode 4 (October 5, 2018)	Pelageya	6	Olga Muravina	"Песенка о хорошем настроении"	39.5%	Eliminated
Episode 4 (October 5, 2018)	Leonid Agutin	7	Nikolay Agutin	"Come prima" / "Piove"	30.3%	Eliminated
Episode 4 (October 5, 2018)	Leonid Agutin	8	Nikolay Arutyunov	"Этикет"	69.7%	Advanced
Episode 4 (October 5, 2018)	Super Final					
Episode 4 (October 5, 2018)	Valery Meladze	1	Sergey Manukyan	"Нежность"	Third Place	
Episode 4 (October 5, 2018)	Lev Leshchenko	2	Evgeny Strugalsky	"Песня старого извозчика"	48.3%	Runner-up
Episode 4 (October 5, 2018)	Pelageya	3	Lidiya Muzalyova	"Я когда-то была молодая"	51.7%	Winner
Episode 4 (October 5, 2018)	Leonid Agutin	4	Nikolay Arutyunov	"(I Can't Get No) Satisfaction"	Third Place	

Non-competition performances
Order	Performer	Song
4.1	Pelageya & Lev Leshchenko (in memory of Charles Aznavour)	"Вечная любовь"
4.2	Lidiya Muzalyova (winner)	"Оренбургский пуховый платок"

== Best Coach ==
Colour key

- Best Coach
- Second place
- Third place
- Fourth place
- Episode's Best Coach

Coach	Public's vote _{(per episode)}				Result
Coach	#1	#2	#3	Av.	Result
Pelageya	36%	37%	40%	38%	Best Coach
Leonid Agutin	30%	31%	33%	31%	Second place
Valery Meladze	19%	14%	15%	16%	Third place
Lev Leshchenko	15%	18%	12%	15%	Fourth place

== Reception ==
=== Rating ===
Episode		Original airdate	Production	Time slot (UTC+3)	Audience		Source
Episode		Original airdate	Production	Time slot (UTC+3)	Rating	Share	Source
1	"The Blind Auditions Premiere"	September 14, 2018	101	Friday 9:30 p.m.	5.6	21.7	
2	"The Blind Auditions, Part 2"	September 21, 2018	102	Friday 9:30 p.m.	5.6	21.4	
3	"The Knockouts"	September 28, 2018	103	Friday 9:30 p.m.	5.5	20.7	
4	"Live Final"	October 5, 2018	104	Friday 9:30 p.m.	5.1	19.2	
