= Elena Vaenga =

Russian singer, songwriter and actress (born 1977)

Elena Vaenga Елена Ваенга
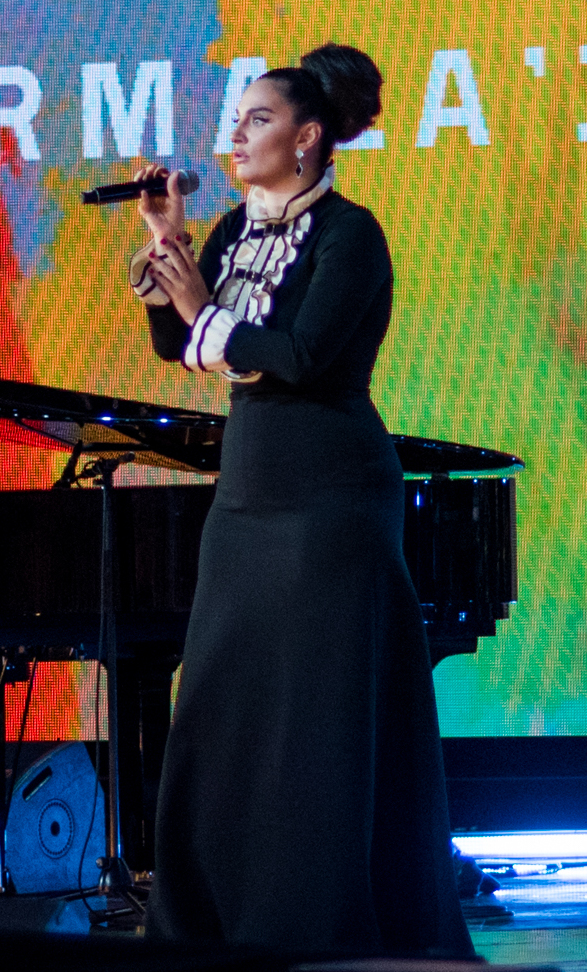

Background information
- Born: Elena Vladimirovna Khrulyova; January 27, 1977 (age 49); Severomorsk, Russian SFSR, Soviet Union
- Genres: russian chanson, folk, romance
- Occupation: Singer-songwriter
- Years active: 1996–present
- Award: Golden Gramophone Award Merited Artist of the Russian Federation (2025)
- Website: vaenga.ru

Elena Vladimirovna Khrulyova (Note: In this name that follows East Slavic naming customs, the patronymic is Vladimirovna and the family name is Khrulyova.) (born 27 January 1977), better known by the stage name Elena Vaenga (Russian: Елена Ваенга), is a popular Russian singer, songwriter and actress. Her style of singing is author song, folk rock, chanson and others. Vaenga's repertoire includes her own compositions, traditional ballads and folk songs, and songs derived from classical Russian poems. In 2025, she was awarded as a Merited Artist of the Russian Federation.

== Life and career ==
Vaenga was born in Severomorsk, Soviet Union. She takes her stage name from the name of a river near her birthplace, the Vaenga River.

Her mother was educated as a chemist and her father was an engineer. Her maternal grandfather was a rear-admiral and her paternal grandparents were natives of Saint Petersburg (formerly Leningrad), and survived the Nazi siege of that city during World War II.

In 2012 she gave birth to a son in Saint Petersburg. The son's father is Roman Sadyrbaev, her husband since 2016.

Vaenga performed throughout Russia, including several appearances in the Kremlin. She also performed in Israel, Germany, and Ukraine.

The newspaper Komsomolskaya Pravda called her "one of the most popular Russian singers". In 2011, Vaenga ranked 9th in the list of the most successful Russian entertainers, with a total income for that year of over six million dollars.

As part of the Russo-Ukrainian War of 22 January 2023, Vaenga was designated as a person subject to sanctions by Ukraine due to being a public figure who "publicly calls for and justifies the Russian Federation's armed aggression against the Ukraine and Ukrainian territory".

== Discography ==
=== Albums ===
- 1998 — Портрет (Portret / Portrait)
- 1998 — Дюны (Duny / Dunes)
- 2003 — Флейта 1 (Fleyta 1 / Flute 1)
- 2005 — Флейта 2 (Fleyta 2 / Flute 2)
- 2005 — Белая птица (Belaya Ptista / The White Bird)
- 2006 — Шопен (Chopin)
- 2007 — Абсент (Абсент / Absinthe)
- 2008 — Клавиши (Klavishi / Keys)
- 2012 — Лена (Lena)
- 2015 — New
- 2016 — Песни Военных Лет (Songs of the War Years (i.e., World War II))
- 2021 — #ре#ля (#re#lya)

=== Compilations ===
- 2014 — The Best
- 2018 — 1+1. Дуэты (Duets)
