= Valeriy Syutkin =

Russian singer and musician (born 1958)

Valery Syutkin
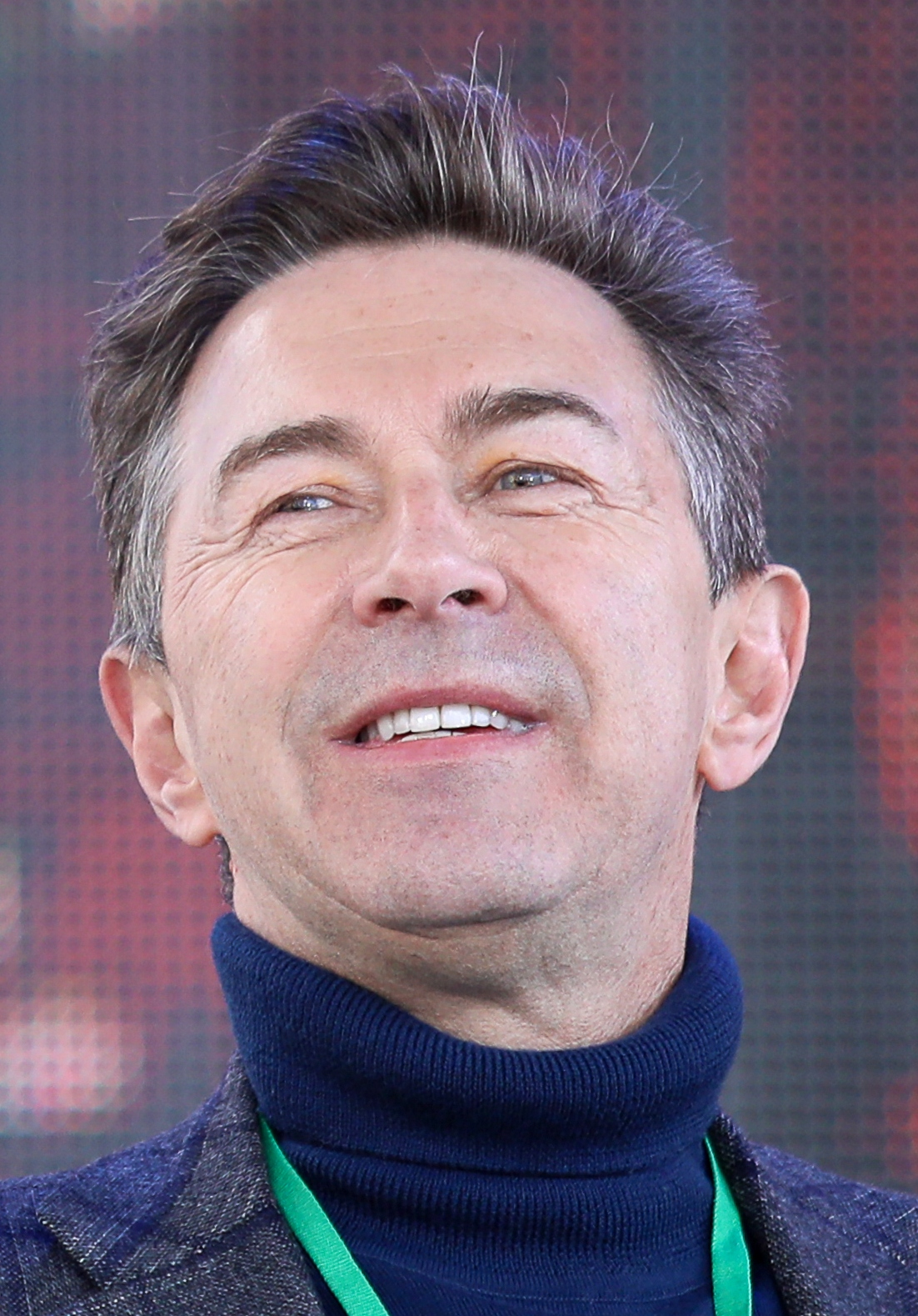
- Syutkin in 2018

Background information
- Born: Valery Miladovich Syutkin; 22 March 1958 (age 68); Moscow, Russian SFSR, Soviet Union
- Genres: Rock and roll, blues, romance, pop-rock, jazz
- Occupations: Singer-songwriter, multi-instrumentalist, television presenter
- Instruments: Vocals, guitar, drums, bass-guitar, Synthesizer

Valery Miladovich Syutkin (Russian: Вале́рий Миладович Сю́ткин; born 22 March 1958 in Moscow) is a Russian singer and musician, best known as the vocalist and songwriter for the rock-n-roll band "Bravo".

Syutkin is an Honored Artist of Russia (2008), and a professor of vocals and artistic director of the Pop Music Department of M.A. Sholokhov MGGU. He is also a board member of the Russian Authors Society.

His most well-known songs include "Flying on 7000", "Moscow-Neva", "Nighttime Roads FM", "Black Cat" and "Pretty Boy".

== Early life ==
Syutkin was born in Moscow on 22 March 1958 and is an only child. He spent his childhood at the intersection of Yauzsky and Pokrovsky Boulevard at Obukha Street (now Vorontsovo Field St.). Syutkin was born to Bronislava Andreevna Brzhezitskaya and Milad Alexandrovich Syutkin, a teacher at the Military Engineering Academy. He participated in several garage bands as a bass player or a drummer during the 1970s. Playing in the school ensemble, he covered songs by The Beatles, Grand Funk Railroad, Deep Purple, Led Zeppelin, Slade, and Smokie.

== Career ==
Before joining the army, he worked as an apprentice chef in the "Ukraine" restaurant. He served in the Air Force as aircraft mechanic in the Far East from 1976 to 1978. In his spare time he played at the airport in the ensemble "Flight". Flight included several well-known musicians, including Alexey Glyzin. In 1980 he began working with "Telephone", which two years later became a professional philharmonic touring team. "Telephone" released the album "Ka Ka", which contains songs about invented characters Suleiman Suleimanovich Kadyrov and Lev Abramovich Cascade. "Telephone" dissolved in 1984. Prior to joining the professional scene, Syutkin worked as a bartender, a porter at the Belorussky Railway Station, and finally as a conductor of passenger car. In 1985 Syutkin released the album "Twist-stage" where he accompanied Yuri Loza (guitar), Alexander Belonosov (keyboards), Gennady Gordeev (drums) and former "Bravo" saxophonist Alexander Stepanenko. In the same year Syutkin joined "Architects", where he sang with Yuri Vine.

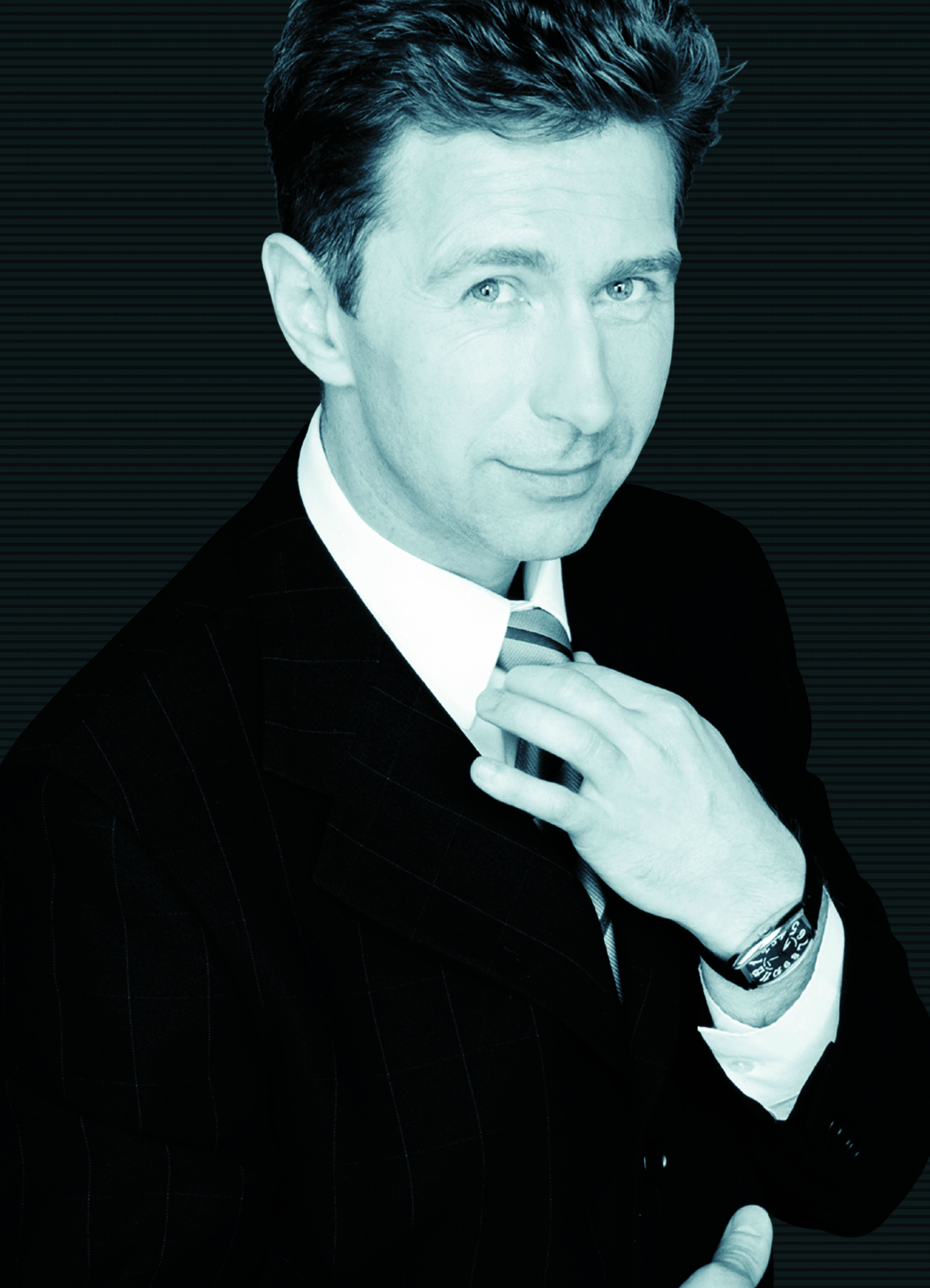
In 2004

After the departure of the Architects, he joined the Fan-o-man, a trio with whom he recorded the album "Caviar grain", and won the Audience Award at the International Competition "Steps to Parnassus". He worked for two years in the company of Mikhail Boyarsky, where he sang to the accompaniment orchestra "range". In August 1990, he received an offer from Havtan, joined "Bravo". Syutkin developed his present musical style working with "Bravo". Musically, his style takes elements from American popular music of the 1950s. With "Bravo", Syutkin recorded the albums "A Hipster from Moscow", "Moscow Beat", "LIVE IN MOSCOW" and "Road to the Clouds". All albums received multi-platinum status. The songs of this period are still heard on the radio. In 1995, Syutkin split from "Bravo" and created the group "Syutkin & Co", which recorded the albums: "That's It", "Radio Nighttime Roads ", "Not Everything...", and "004". In 1995, the song "7000 Above Earth" (Flying on 7000) from the album "That's it" was recognized as the best hit of the year. Since 2004, to acknowledge additions to the original core group, the band is called "Syutkin ROCK AND ROLL BAND". Syutkin received the "Golden Gramophone" for his songs "Minibus" (2009) and "Moscow-Neva" (2012). From 2002 to 2003, he starred in the music game show "Two Pianos" on RTR. He also starred in the Culture program "Hit Again" in 2004.

He participated in the project of the Channel One Russia "Stars on Ice" and was paired with figure skater Irina Lobacheva. He acted in the second part TV a musical "Old songs about the main". He was a frequent participant at the "Cherry Forest" Festival. He served as a Member of Cultural Programs at the Olympic Games in Seoul (1988), Athens (2004), Turin (2006), Beijing (2008), Vancouver (2010), and London (2012). He also served as the Cultural Ambassador of the Olympic Games in Sochi (2014). In March 2008, Syutkin was awarded the title "Honored Artist of the Russian Federation" for merits in the field of art. He has been the chairman of "The Muses of the world" ("Contemporary Art and Education") which chooses contestants in the "Variety and jazz performance". In 2015, with the team drummer Andrey Nikonov, he recorded the album "Moskvich 2015". The album includes songs from the 1950s and 1960s.

== Controversy ==
In an interview in 2014, Syutkin expressed his support to the annexation of the Ukrainian peninsula of Crimea by Russia. In 2020, he was banned from entering Ukraine for this statement, and a previously planned concert in Kyiv was cancelled.

== Personal life ==
He has been married three times. Valery is married to Viola since 1993, they have a daughter Viola Jr. (born 1996) and a son Leo (born 2020).

From previous marriages, he has two children: daughter Elena (born 1980) and son Maksim (1987).

They have a granddaughter Vasilisa (born 2014).

== Discography ==
=== In bands and ensembles ===
Telefon

- Телефон-1 (unreleased, 1981)
- Концерт в ФизТехе (1982)
- Кадыров-Каскад (Ка-Ка) (1983)
- Концерт во Владивостоке (1984)
- Твист-Каскад (1985)

Zodchiye

- Рок-панорама-1986 (1986)
- Концерт в Таллине (1987)
- Экология (1987)
- Дитя урбанизма (1987)
- Пятая Серия (1987)

Fen-o-men

- Икра зернистая (1989)

Bravo

- «Стиляги из Москвы» (1990)
- «Московский бит» (Moscow beat, 1992)
- «Live in Moscow» (1994)
- «Дорога в облака» (1994)
- «Песни разных лет» (1995)

=== Solo discography ===
with Ko

- «То, что надо» (1995)
- «Радио ночных дорог» (1996)
- «Далеко не всё» (1998)
- «004» (2000)
- «Лучшие песни» (2002)

With rock and roll band

- «Grand collection» (2006)
- «Новое и лучшее» (2010)
- «Целуйтесь медленно» (2012)

With Light Jazz

- «Москвич 2015» (Moskivch, 2015)

== See also ==
- Russian book ban in Ukraine
- Boycott Russian Films
