= Alexander Malinin =

Russian singer (born 1958)

Alexander Malinin Александр Малинин
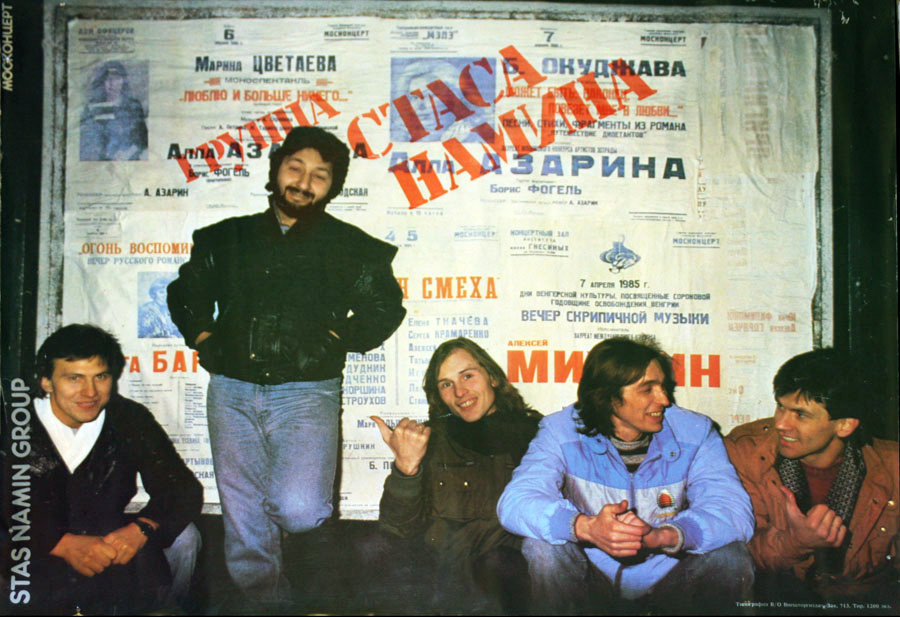
- Malinin (middle) with the ensemble Gruppa Stasa Namina in 1986

Background information
- Born: Aleksandr Nikolaevich Vyguzov; November 16, 1958 (age 67); Sverdlovsk, Soviet Union
- Genres: Russian romance, Operatic pop, pop, soft rock
- Occupation: Singer
- Years active: 1981–present
- Website: www.malinin.ru

"Nado zhit"
Sample of "Nado zhit" by Alexander Malinin (2000)

Aleksandr Nikolaevich Malinin (Russian: Александр Николаевич Малинин, born Vyguzov, Russian: Выгузов; 16 November 1958) is a Russian singer who was named a People's Artist of Russia in 1997.

== Career ==
Malinin was born in Yekaterinburg (then Sverdlovsk) as Aleksandr Nikolaevich Vyguzov.

At the end of the 1980s, he toured the United States and made a duet with David Pomeranz, becoming the first Soviet singer to collaborate with an American musician since the breakout of the Cold War.

Between 1990 and 1996, he gave several sold-out concerts named Балы с Александром Малининым (Dances with Aleksandr Malinin), breaking attendance records. The series of concerts were also broadcast on television. In 1994, he received the World Music Award as the best selling Russian artist.

Malinin is married and has four children. His son named Anton (born in 1982) was educated in part in the UK, attending Haileybury & Imperial Service College in Hertfordshire.

== Popular Songs ==
- "Berega" ("Берега")
- "Belyj Kon" ("Белый конь")
- "Naprasnie slova" ("Напрасные слова")
- "Molba" ("Мольба")
- "Zabava" ("Забава")
- "I Lyubov' i razluka" ("Любовь и разлука")
- "Dai bog" ("Дай, Бог")
- "Nado zhit" ("Надо жить")
- "Ty Takaya Krasivaya" ("Ты такая красивая")

== Awards ==
Awards
World Music Awards
Preceded by 1993 Laima Vaikule	Best-Selling Russian Artist; 1994; Alexander Malinin	Succeeded by 1995 Dmitry Malikov
