= Laima Vaikule =

Latvian actor and singer (born 1954)

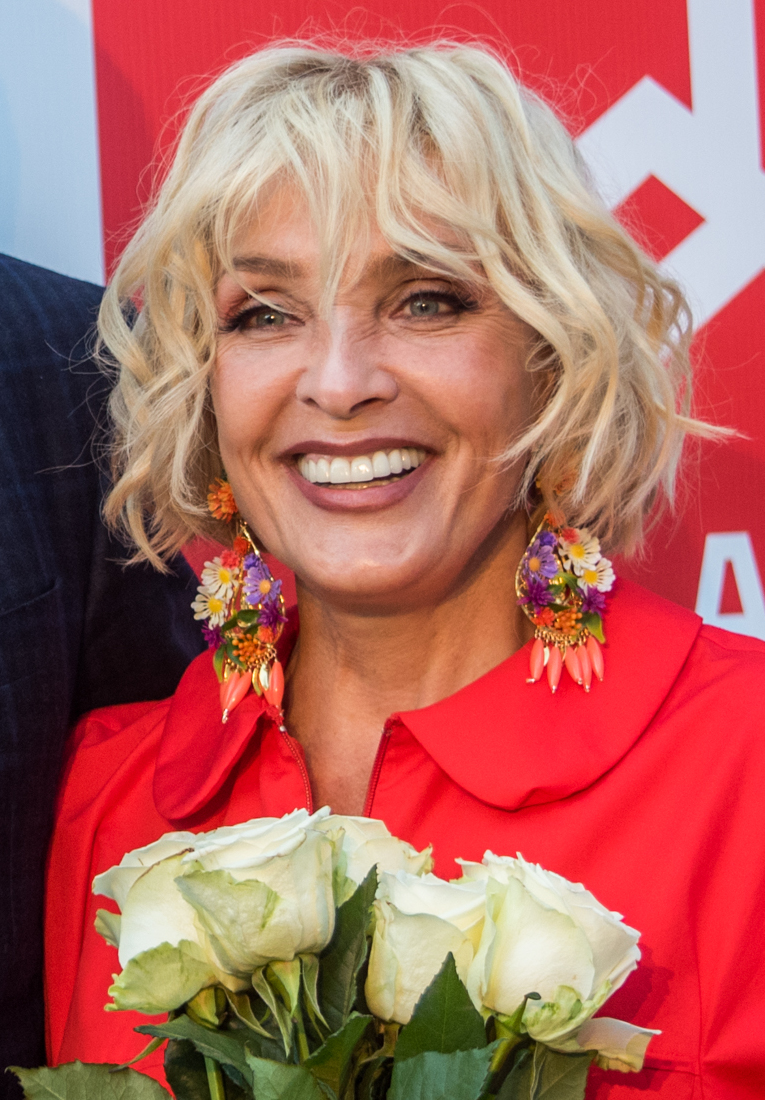
- Vaikule in 2017

Background information
- Born: March 31, 1954 (age 72); Cēsis, Soviet Latvia, Soviet Union (now Latvia)
- Genres: Pop music; estrada
- Occupations: Singer; actor
- Instruments: Singing
- Years active: 1966–present
- Labels: Melodiya; RiTonis; MCA; GRP; Microphone; Soyuz; Extraphone; Universal Russia
- Website: laima.com

Laima Vaikule (born 31 March 1954) is a Latvian actress, singer, director, and choreographer, best known in Europe and in the former Soviet Union for such popular hits as "Vernissage" and "Charlie," among other songs.

== Biography ==
Vaikule was born on 31 March 1954, in Cēsis, Latvia. Her parents moved to Riga when she was three. Young Laima was fond of music and dancing. In 1966, at the age of 12, she took part in a competition of young singers and was noticed. Between 1970 and 1973, she studied nursing at the Vilnius Medical College, while also continuing to sing with a band. Eventually, she became a lead singer with a local band in Riga, Latvia and worked night gigs at local clubs and restaurants for several years. In the 1980s she studied acting and directing at Moscow State Institute for Theatrical Arts (GITIS), graduating as actress and director.

In 1985, Laima Vaikule made her first hit in the Soviet Union. Since 1986, Vaikule has been enjoying a fruitful collaboration with popular Latvian composer, Raimonds Pauls, and Russian poet Ilya Reznik, who wrote such hits as "Vernisage", "Charlie" and "Skripach na kryshe" ("Fiddler on the roof"). She is among the original organizers of the Jurmala Festival of popular music, along with Raimonds Pauls. During the 1980s and 1990s Laima Vaikule was a regular participant at international music competitions and festivals across Europe. Vaikule was awarded the Golden Lyra at the 1987 Bratislavská lýra, was a guest singer and a host at "Jurmala 92" festival, and also took part at "AU music world" in Monaco, among other festivals and competitions. She was awarded the title Peoples Artist of Latvia (1995) and the Grand Music Award (1996) for her special contribution to the music and culture of Latvia.

== Personal life ==
Vaikule is currently living and working in Riga, Latvia and owns a second home in Moscow, Russia. She is an animal rights activist and a vegetarian.

== Public position ==
Laima Vaikule is known as an active advocate of animal rights. She is a vegetarian for ethical reasons.

In August 2018, while touring in Odesa, Vaikule said that she would not perform in Crimea, regardless of the fee offered to her. She explained "I'm a citizen of the European Union, I don't have the right to travel there", receiving criticism from Russian Senator Aleksey Pushkov and several Russian cultural figures. Vaikule later went on Russian national television, where she said her answer had been misinterpreted and what she meant was that the law forbids her from going to Crimea, not that she would not want to perform there. When asked by the anchor, whether she would perform in Crimea if no Latvian law forbade it, Vaikule answered positively.

In 2019, in an interview with the YouTube channel A pogovorit?, the singer expressed support for the LGBT community.

In February 2022, she condemned the Russian invasion of Ukraine.

In December 2022, she gave an interview to the television channel Dozhd, in which she commented on claims that her entire career would have been impossible without the Soviet Union.

"I supported the philharmonic; I supported the Soviet Union by releasing my records. Because I was paid 17 rubles while filling a stadium with 45,000 people. If anyone has nothing better to do, calculate how much money I brought the state. The Melodiya record company sold 20 million copies of my record. I received 137 rubles for that," the singer said. "And I am not even talking about Alla. Alla is absolutely number one as a person and a musician; there is nothing to discuss. The biggest star in Russia is Alla. She devoted her entire life to the stage and to these people, but what she got in return was a slap in the face. Not from everyone, but from a small, angry and foolish group… Calculate who supported whom and who paid whom. I did my work, and I supported the entire Soviet Union. And Alla supported all of this Russia that is now making accusations against her. We earned so much money for the USSR that it is embarrassing to even say."

== Popular songs ==
- It's Not Evening Yet
- Yellow Leaves
- Vernisage
- What Does the Pianist Play
- Fiddler On the Roof
- Charlie
- On Piccadilly Street

== Awards and honors ==
- Zlatá Bratislavská lyra (1987)
- Merited Artist of Latvian SSR (1990)
- World Music Awards (1993)
- Peoples Artist of Latvia (1995)
- Grand Music Award (1996)
- Order of Friendship (2011)
- Certificate of Merit of the President of Latvia (2019)
- Golden Gramophone Award (2019)

Awards
World Music Awards
Preceded by 1992 Oleg Gazmanov	Best-Selling Russian Artist; 1993; Laima Vaikule	Succeeded by 1994 Alexander Malinin
