= Igor Kornelyuk =

Soviet-Belarusian singer (born 1962)

Igor Yevgenyevich Kornelyuk
- Born: November 16, 1962 (age 63)
- Origin: Brest, Byelorussian SSR, Soviet Union
- Website: igorkorneluk.ru

Igor Yevgenyevich Kornelyuk (Russian: Игорь Евгеньевич Корнелюк; born 16 November 1962) is a Soviet and Belarusian musician, singer and composer.

== Biography ==
Igor Kornelyuk started studying music at the local child music school in Brest when he was 6 years old. At the age of 12, he played keyboards in the ensemble of the Palace of Dance Culture in Brest.

In 1978, Igor Kornelyuk moved to Leningrad to study at the School of Music of the Nikolai Rimsky-Korsakov Conservatory. He graduated in 1982, and started to follow the Composition classes at the same institute, from which he graduated in 1987. Being a student, he worked as musical director and composer for the Leningrad Theatre Buff.

His professional career started in 1988, when he reached the final of the TV show Song of the Year with his song Bilyet na Balyet (Ticket to the Ballet).

Igor Kornelyuk wrote more than 200 popular songs, many of which were recorded by popular Russian singers like Mikhail Boyarsky, Anne Veski, Edita Piekha and Philipp Kirkorov, and he wrote the soundtracks for some of the most renowned Russian films and TV-series directed by Vladimir Bortko like Gangsters of Saint-Petersburg, The Idiot, The Master and Margarita and Taras Bulba.

== Discography ==
- 1988 – Bilyet na Balyet (A ticket to the ballet)
- 1990 – Podozhdi (Wait)
- 1994 – Ya ne mogu tak zhit (I can not live like this)
- 1994 – Moy lyubimye pesni (My favorite songs)
- 1998 – Privyet, a eto Kornelyuk! (Hi, this is Kornelyuk!)
- 2003 – Banditskiy Peterburg (Gangsters of Petersburg - soundtrack)
- 2010 – Pesni iz kino (Songs from the movie)
- 2010 – Taras Bulba (Taras Bulba - soundtrack)
- 2010 – Master i Margarita (The Master and Margarita - soundtrack)
