= The Voice Kids (Russian TV series) season 1 =

The Voice Kids
- Season 1
- Presented by: Dmitry Nagiev; Natalia Vodianova
- Coaches: Dima Bilan; Pelageya; Maxim Fadeev
- Winner: Alisa Kozhikina
- Winning coach: Maxim Fadeev
- Runner-up: Ragda Khanieva

Release
- Original network: Channel One
- Original release: 28 February – 25 April 2014

Season chronology
- Next → Season 2

The first season of the Russian reality talent show The Voice Kids premiered on February 28, 2014, on Channel One. Dima Bilan, Pelageya, and Maxim Fadeev became the first coaches. Dmitry Nagiev and Natalia Vodianova became the show's presenter.

Alisa Kozhikina was announced the winner on April 25, 2014, marking Maxim Fadeev's first win as a coach.

== Coaches and presenters ==
The Voice Kids season 1 coaching panel and presenters

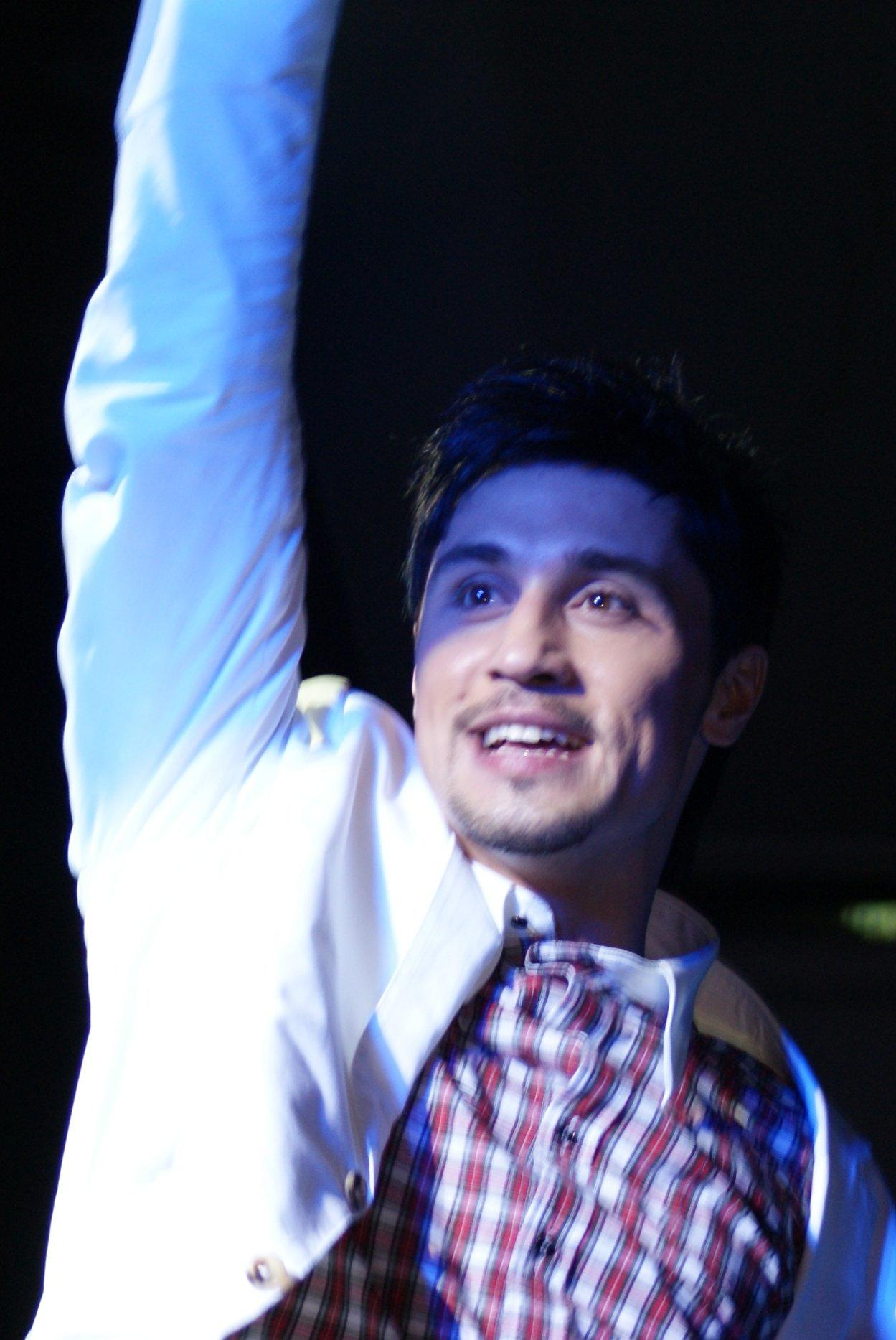
Dima Bilan

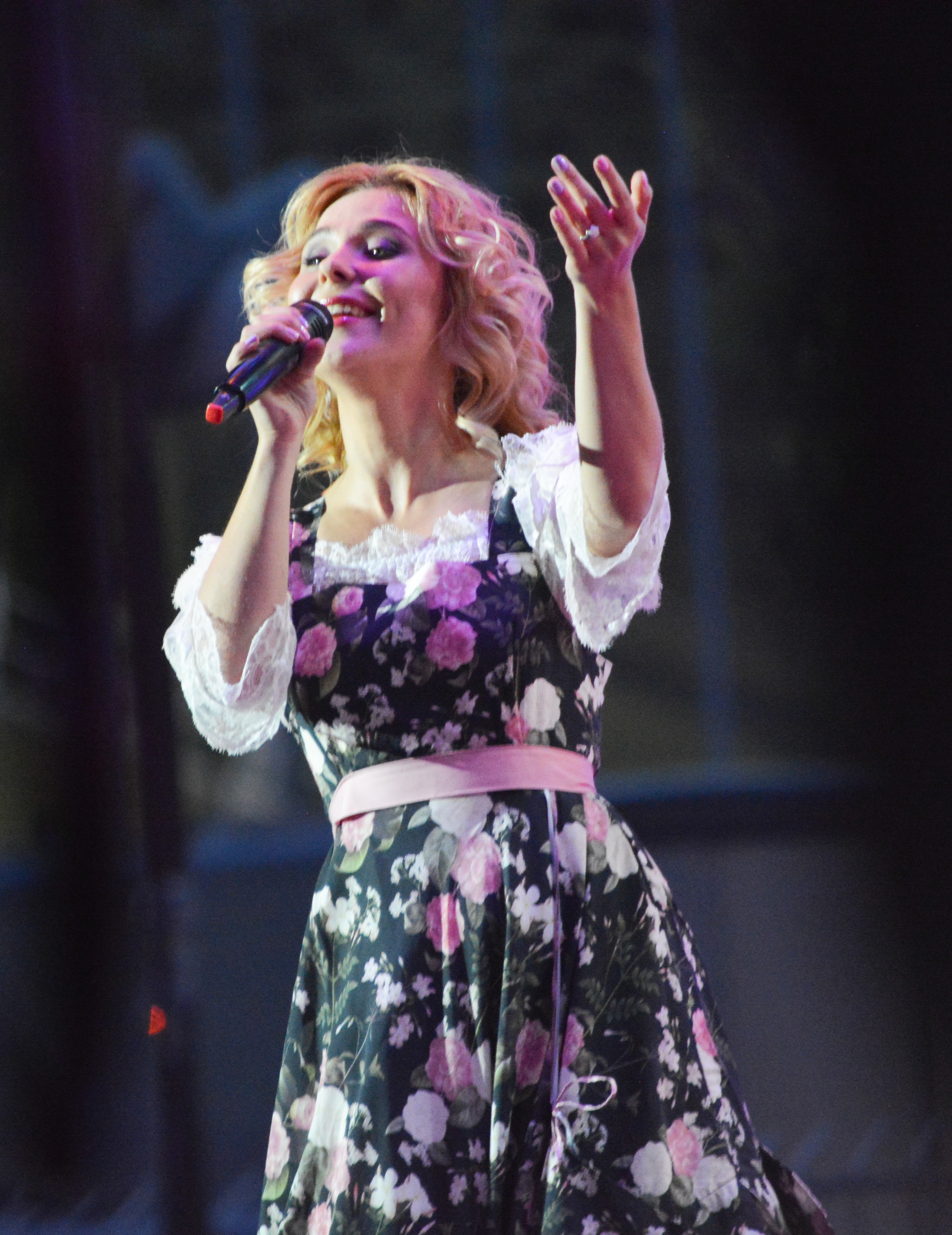
Pelageya

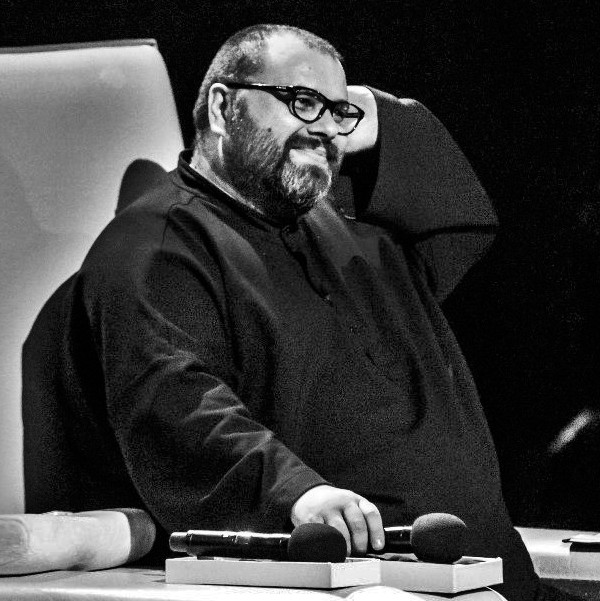
Maxim Fadeev

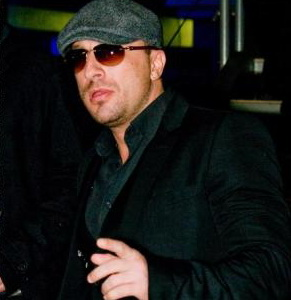
Dmitry Nagiev

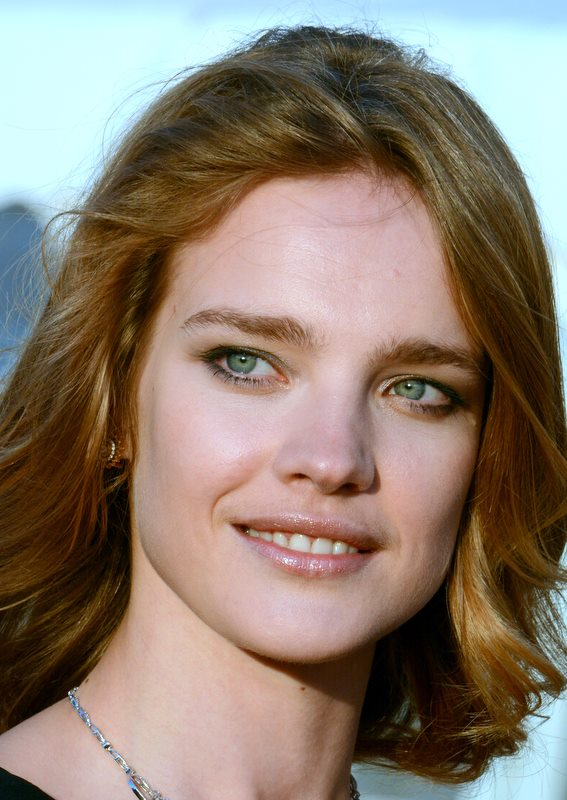
Natalia Vodianova

Dima Bilan, Pelageya, and Maxim Fadeev became the coaches. Bilan and Pelageya also was a coaches in 1–2 seasons of «The Voice». Dmitry Nagiev (presenter of «The Voice») and Natalia Vodianova became the presenters.

== Teams ==
Colour key

- Winner
- Runner-up
- Third place
- Eliminated in the Final
- Eliminated in the Sing-offs
- Eliminated in the Battle rounds

Coaches	Top 45 Artists				
Dima Bilan	Lev Akselrod	Kristian Kostov	Viktoria Volkova	Aygul Valiulina	Syuzanna Mkhitaryan
Dima Bilan	Alen Ershov	Ilya Bortkov	Nika Terentyeva	Polina Bogusevich	Mariya Yushina
Dima Bilan	Daniil Kuznetsov	Evgeniy Shkunov	Tatyana Gevorgyan	Kristina Kukasyan	Mishel Petrovich
Pelageya	Ragda Khanieva	Anastasia Titova	Elizaveta Puris	Arina Petrova	David Sanikidze
Pelageya	Irakliy Intskirveli	Vladlena Kotova	Anna Zaets	Darya Lebedeva	Rodion Trusov
Pelageya	Arina Danilova	Viktoria Ogannisyan	Milana & Violetta Volskie	Olga Sarakanidi	Roman Mishukov
Maxim Fadeev	Alisa Kozhikina	Ivaylo Filippov	Grant Melikyan	Anna Egorova	Diana Khitarova
Maxim Fadeev	Viktoria Solomakhina	Irina Morozova	Ekaterina Kosolapova	Darina Ivanova	Sofya Fisenko
Maxim Fadeev	Mariya Sverdyukova	Sofya Golubeva	Margarita Volkova	Shukhrat Turdykhodzhaev	Kseniya Chudakova

== Blind auditions ==
Colour key

✔	Coach pressed "I WANT YOU" button
	Artist defaulted to a coach's team
	Artist picked a coach's team
	Artist eliminated with no coach pressing their button

Episode	Order	Artist	Age	Hometown	Song	Coach's and artist's choices		
Episode	Order	Artist	Age	Hometown	Song	Bilan	Pelageya	Fadeev
Episode 1 (February 28, 2014)	1	Nika Terentyeva	8	Vladivostok	"Птица"	✔	—	✔
Episode 1 (February 28, 2014)	2	Lev Akselrod	13	Moscow	"Tell Me Why"	✔	✔	—
Episode 1 (February 28, 2014)	3	Alexandra Klyus	13	Bălți, Moldova	"Если в сердце живёт любовь"	—	—	—
Episode 1 (February 28, 2014)	4	Polina Bogusevich	10	Moscow	"Think"	✔	✔	✔
Episode 1 (February 28, 2014)	5	Alexander Lazin	14	Krasnoyarsk	"Whataya Want From Me"	—	—	—
Episode 1 (February 28, 2014)	6	Margarita Volkova	13	Nizhniy Novgorod	"А знаешь, всё ещё будет!.."	—	—	✔
Episode 1 (February 28, 2014)	7	Olga Sarakanidi	8	Sochi, Krasnodar Krai	"A Tisket, A Tasket"	✔	✔	✔
Episode 1 (February 28, 2014)	8	Anna Egorova	13	Moscow	"Улыбайся"	—	✔	✔
Episode 1 (February 28, 2014)	9	Zulfat Gabdulin	13	Kazan	"Because of You"	—	—	—
Episode 1 (February 28, 2014)	10	Mishel Petrovich	13	Moscow	"Skyfall"	✔	—	—
Episode 1 (February 28, 2014)	11	David Sanikidze	13	Mezhdurechensk, Kemerovo Oblast	"Лучший город Земли"	—	✔	—
Episode 1 (February 28, 2014)	12	Anastasia Dyatlova	10	Moscow	"В горнице"	—	—	—
Episode 1 (February 28, 2014)	13	Grant Melikyan	13	Ivanovo	"Torna a Surriento"	✔	✔	✔
Episode 2 (March 8, 2014)
Episode 2 (March 8, 2014)	1	Ilya Bortkov	10	Moscow	"Kiss"	✔	—	—
Episode 2 (March 8, 2014)	2	Aygul Valiulina	13	Kazan	"Нарисовать мечту"	✔	—	✔
Episode 2 (March 8, 2014)	3	Arina Danilova	9	Yakutsk	"Quizás, quizás, quizás"	✔	✔	✔
Episode 2 (March 8, 2014)	4	Mark Potapov	9	Moscow	"Лучший город Земли"	—	—	—
Episode 2 (March 8, 2014)	5	Ivetta Vladimirova	12	Moscow	"The Girl From Ipanema"	—	—	—
Episode 2 (March 8, 2014)	6	Roman Mishukov	12	Dmitrov, Moscow Oblast	"Santa Lucia"	✔	✔	✔
Episode 2 (March 8, 2014)	7	Mariya Yushina	14	Rybnoye, Ryazan Oblast	"Smile"	✔	—	—
Episode 2 (March 8, 2014)	8	Shukhrat Turdykhodzhaev	11	Tashkent, Uzbekistan	"Простая песня"	✔	—	✔
Episode 2 (March 8, 2014)	9	Ulyana Kuznetsova	10	Orenburg	"Хороший парень"	—	—	—
Episode 2 (March 8, 2014)	10	Darina Ivanova	14	Kyiv, Ukraine	"Believe Me"	—	—	✔
Episode 2 (March 8, 2014)	11	Viktoria Solomakhina	10	Voronezh	"Однажды в декабре"	—	—	✔
Episode 2 (March 8, 2014)	12	Viktor Borisov	11	Volzhsky, Volgograd Oblast	"Пароход"	—	—	—
Episode 2 (March 8, 2014)	13	Irina Morozova	14	Rostov-on-Don	"Non, je ne regrette rien"	✔	✔	✔
Episode 3 (March 14, 2014)
Episode 3 (March 14, 2014)	1	Diana Khitarova	10	Moscow	"Reflection"	✔	✔	✔
Episode 3 (March 14, 2014)	2	Katrina Paula Diringa	8	Riga, Latvia	"Снег"	—	—	—
Episode 3 (March 14, 2014)	3	Kristian Kostov	13	Moscow	"If I Ain't Got You"	✔	✔	✔
Episode 3 (March 14, 2014)	4	Arina Petrova	9	Izhevsk	"Птица"	—	✔	—
Episode 3 (March 14, 2014)	5	Artyom Sigalov	12	Moscow	"Скажите, девушки"	—	—	—
Episode 3 (March 14, 2014)	6	Syuzanna Mkhitaryan	14	Moscow	"Domino"	✔	—	—
Episode 3 (March 14, 2014)	7	Alen Ershov	12	Moscow	"Красный конь"	✔	—	—
Episode 3 (March 14, 2014)	8	Vladlena Kotova	12	Ramenskoye, Moscow Oblast	"Torna a Surriento"	—	✔	—
Episode 3 (March 14, 2014)	9	Sofya Golubeva	12	Moscow	"Я вернусь"	—	—	✔
Episode 3 (March 14, 2014)	10	Viktoria Ogannisyan	13	Moscow	"Ария Дивы Плавалгуны"	—	✔	—
Episode 3 (March 14, 2014)	11	Elisey Nikandrov	12	Ulyanovsk	"Mamma"	—	—	—
Episode 3 (March 14, 2014)	12	Rushana Valieva	14	Tolbazy, Bashkortostan	"А знаешь, всё ещё будет!.."	—	—	—
Episode 3 (March 14, 2014)	13	Anastasia Titova	13	Saint Petersburg	"Moon River"	✔	✔	✔
Episode 4 (March 21, 2014)
Episode 4 (March 21, 2014)	1	Mariya Sverdyukova	8	Vladimir	"Jamaica"	—	—	✔
Episode 4 (March 21, 2014)	2	Yan Gorshenin	14	Samara	"Симона"	—	—	—
Episode 4 (March 21, 2014)	3	Elizaveta Puris	9	Moscow	"Mamma Knows Best"	✔	✔	✔
Episode 4 (March 21, 2014)	4	Daniil Kuznetsov	13	Ekaterinburg	"Sway"	✔	—	—
Episode 4 (March 21, 2014)	5	Anna Zabolotnikova	10	Sinyavino, Leningrad Oblast	"В горнице"	—	—	—
Episode 4 (March 21, 2014)	6	Milana & Violetta Volskie	10/14	Saint Petersburg	"Mamma"	✔	✔	—
Episode 4 (March 21, 2014)	7	Darya Lebedeva	10	Arzamas	"Птица"	—	✔	—
Episode 4 (March 21, 2014)	8	Evgeniy Shkunov	14	Moscow	"Home"	✔	—	—
Episode 4 (March 21, 2014)	9	Tatyana Gevorgyan	11	Krasnodar	"Нежность"	✔	✔	—
Episode 4 (March 21, 2014)	10	Anna Muzafarova	11	Chelyabinsk	"Reflection"	—	—	—
Episode 4 (March 21, 2014)	11	Yana Barinova	12	Lepel, Belarus	"Зурбаган"	—	—	—
Episode 4 (March 21, 2014)	12	Sofya Fisenko	11	Novomoskovsk, Tula Oblast	"Once Upon a December"	—	—	✔
Episode 4 (March 21, 2014)	13	Irakliy Intskirveli	12	Korolyov, Moscow Oblast	"It's a Man's World"	✔	✔	✔
Episode 5 (March 28, 2014)
Episode 5 (March 28, 2014)	1	Ragda Khanieva	12	Moscow	"And I'm Telling You"	✔	✔	✔
Episode 5 (March 28, 2014)	2	Kseniya Chudakova	11	Orenburg	"А знаешь, всё ещё будет!.."	—	—	✔
Episode 5 (March 28, 2014)	3	Anton Savkin	14	Lipetsk	"Скажите, девушки"	—	—	—
Episode 5 (March 28, 2014)	4	Kristina Kukasyan	13	Maykop	"Think"	✔	—	✔
Episode 5 (March 28, 2014)	5	Vilena Khikmatullina	8	Kazan	"Нарисовать мечту"	—	—	—
Episode 5 (March 28, 2014)	6	Ivaylo Filippov	14	Moscow	"It's a Man's World"	✔	✔	✔
Episode 5 (March 28, 2014)	7	Madina Mukhamedshina	12	Kazan	"Call Me Maybe"	—	—	—
Episode 5 (March 28, 2014)	8	Alisa Kozhikina	10	Uspenka, Kursk Oblast	"Sunny"	—	✔	✔
Episode 5 (March 28, 2014)	9	Egor Martynenko	12	Saint Petersburg	"Пароход"	—	—	—
Episode 5 (March 28, 2014)	10	Viktoria Volkova	13	Vologda	"Smile"	✔	—	✔
Episode 5 (March 28, 2014)	11	Anna Zaets	12	Moscow	"Non, je ne regrette rien"	Team full	✔	—
Episode 5 (March 28, 2014)	12	Rodion Trusov	11	Omsk	"Santa Lucia"	Team full	✔	✔
Episode 5 (March 28, 2014)	13	Ekaterina Kosolapova	10	Severodvinsk, Arkhangelsk Oblast	"Mamma Knows Best"	Team full	Team full	✔

== The Battles ==
The Battles round started with the first half of episode 6 and ended with the first half of episode 8 (broadcast on April 4, 11, 18, 2014). Contestants who win their battle will advance to the Sing-offs round.

Colour key

Artist won the Battle and advanced to the Sing-offs
Artist was eliminated

Episode	Coach	Order	Winner	Song	Losers	
Episode 6 (April 4, 2014)	Dima Bilan	1	Viktoria Volkova	"Ту-лу-ла"	Nika Terentyeva	Tatyana Gevorgyan
Episode 6 (April 4, 2014)	Dima Bilan	2	Susanna Mkhitaryan	"Dance with Somebody"	Mariya Yushina	Mishel Petrovich
Episode 6 (April 4, 2014)	Dima Bilan	3	Kristian Kostov	"Эта музыка"	Evgeniy Shkunov	Ilya Bortkov
Episode 6 (April 4, 2014)	Dima Bilan	4	Aygul Valiulina	"Wannabe"	Polina Bogusevich	Kristina Kukasyan
Episode 6 (April 4, 2014)	Dima Bilan	5	Lev Akselrod	"Я буду помнить"	Alen Ershov	Danil Kuznetsov
Episode 7 (April 11, 2014)	Pelageya	1	David Sanikidze	"Тополя"	Roman Mishukov	Rodion Trusov
Episode 7 (April 11, 2014)	Pelageya	2	Elizaveta Puris	"Skyfall"	Anna Zaets	Milana & Violetta Voolskie
Episode 7 (April 11, 2014)	Pelageya	3	Anastasia Titova	"Ave Maria"	Viktoria Ogannisyan	Vladlena Kotova
Episode 7 (April 11, 2014)	Pelageya	4	Arina Petrova	"Ночка луговая"	Darya Lebedeva	Olga Sarakanidi
Episode 7 (April 11, 2014)	Pelageya	5	Ragda Khanieva	"Feeling Good"	Irakliy Intskirveli	Arina Danilova
Episode 8 (April 18, 2014)	Maxim Fadeev	1	Anna Egorova	"Потанцуем, Джек"	Shukhrat Turdykhodzhaev	Darina Ivanova
Episode 8 (April 18, 2014)	Maxim Fadeev	2	Alisa Kozhikina	"Боль"	Mariya Sverdyukova	Viktoria Solomakhina
Episode 8 (April 18, 2014)	Maxim Fadeev	3	Ivaylo Filipov	"I Wish"	Irina Morozova	Sofya Golubeva
Episode 8 (April 18, 2014)	Maxim Fadeev	4	Grant Melikyan	"Высоко"	Margarita Volkova	Ekaterina Kosolapova
Episode 8 (April 18, 2014)	Maxim Fadeev	5	Diana Khitarova	"Wrecking Ball"	Kseniya Chudakova	Sofya Fisenko

== The Sing-offs ==
The Sing-offs round started with the second half of episode 6 and ended with the second half of episode 8 (broadcast on April 4, 11, 18, 2014). Contestants who was saved by their coaches will advance to the Final.

Colour key

Artist was saved by his/her coach and advanced to the Final
Artist was eliminated

Episode	Coach	Order	Artist	Song	Result
Episode 6 (April 4, 2014)	Dima Bilan	1	Viktoria Volkova	"Smile"	Eliminated
Episode 6 (April 4, 2014)	Dima Bilan	2	Syuzanna Mkhitaryan	"Domino"	Eliminated
Episode 6 (April 4, 2014)	Dima Bilan	3	Kristian Kostov	"If I Ain't Got You"	Advanced to the Final
Episode 6 (April 4, 2014)	Dima Bilan	4	Aygul Valiulina	"Нарисовать мечту"	Eliminated
Episode 6 (April 4, 2014)	Dima Bilan	5	Lev Akselrod	"Tell Me Why"	Advanced to the Final
Episode 7 (April 11, 2014)	Pelageya	1	David Sanikidze	"Лучший город Земли"	Eliminated
Episode 7 (April 11, 2014)	Pelageya	2	Elizaveta Puris	"Mamma Knows Best"	Eliminated
Episode 7 (April 11, 2014)	Pelageya	3	Anastasia Titova	"Moon River"	Advanced to the Final
Episode 7 (April 11, 2014)	Pelageya	4	Arina Petrova	"Птица"	Eliminated
Episode 7 (April 11, 2014)	Pelageya	5	Ragda Khanieva	"And I'm Telling You"	Advanced to the Final
Episode 8 (April 18, 2014)	Maxim Fadeev	1	Anna Egorova	"Улыбайся"	Eliminated
Episode 8 (April 18, 2014)	Maxim Fadeev	2	Alisa Kozhikina	"Sunny"	Advanced to the Final
Episode 8 (April 18, 2014)	Maxim Fadeev	3	Ivaylo Filippov	"It's a Man's World	Advanced to the Final
Episode 8 (April 18, 2014)	Maxim Fadeev	4	Grant Melikyan	"Torna a Surriento"	Eliminated
Episode 8 (April 18, 2014)	Maxim Fadeev	5	Diana Khitarova	"Reflection"	Eliminated

== Live shows ==
Colour key:

Artist was saved by the Public's votes and advanced to the Super Final
Artist was eliminated

=== Week 1: Final ===
Episode	Coach	Order	Artist	Song	Public's vote	Result
Episode 9 (April 25, 2014)
Episode 9 (April 25, 2014)	Final					
Episode 9 (April 25, 2014)	Dima Bilan	1	Lev Akselrod	"Замок из дождя"	60.2%	Advanced to the Super Final
Episode 9 (April 25, 2014)	Dima Bilan	2	Kristian Kostov	"Знаешь"	39.8%	Eliminated
Episode 9 (April 25, 2014)	Pelageya	3	Anastasia Titova	"Лебединая верность"	48.4%	Eliminated
Episode 9 (April 25, 2014)	Pelageya	4	Ragda Khanieva	"Путь"	51.6%	Advanced to the Super Final
Episode 9 (April 25, 2014)	Maxim Fadeev	5	Alisa Kozhikina	"The Best"	85%	Advanced to the Super Final
Episode 9 (April 25, 2014)	Maxim Fadeev	6	Ivaylo Filippov	"Blue Suede Shoes"	15%	Eliminated
Episode 9 (April 25, 2014)	Super Final					
Episode 9 (April 25, 2014)	Dima Bilan	1	Lev Akselrod	"The Show Must Go On"	17.1%	Third place
Episode 9 (April 25, 2014)	Pelageya	2	Ragda Khanieva	"Friends Will Be Friends"	24.7%	Runner-up
Episode 9 (April 25, 2014)	Maxim Fadeev	3	Alisa Kozhikina	"My All"	58.2%	Winner

Non-competition performances
Order	Performer	Song
9.1	Lev Akselrod, Kristian Kostov, Ragda Khanieva, Anastasia Titova, Alisa Kozhikina, and Ivaylo Filippov	"Black or White"
9.2	Dima Bilan, Lev Akselrod and Kristian Kostov	"На берегу неба"
9.3	Pelageya, Ragda Khanieva and Anastasia Titova	"Конь"
9.4	Maxim Fadeev, Alisa Kozhikina and Ivaylo Filippov	"Twist and Shout"
9.5	Alisa Kozhikina (winner)	"The Best"
9.6	All artists of the 1st season	"Это финал"

== Reception ==
=== Ratings ===
Episode		Original airdate	Production	Time slot (UTC+3)	Audience	
Episode		Original airdate	Production	Time slot (UTC+3)	Rating	Share
1	"The Blind Auditions Premiere"	February 28, 2014	101	Friday 9:30 p.m.	8.6	24.8
2	"The Blind Auditions, Part 2"	March 8, 2014	102	Saturday 9:30 p.m.	7.7	22.5
3	"The Blind Auditions, Part 3"	March 14, 2014	103	Friday 9:30 p.m.	8.6	27.0
4	"The Blind Auditions, Part 4"	March 21, 2014	104	Friday 9:30 p.m.	9.0	29.1
5	"The Blind Auditions, Part 5"	March 28, 2014	105	Friday 9:30 p.m.	9.5	29.5
6	"The Battles and the Sing-offs Premiere"	April 4, 2014	106	Friday 9:30 p.m.	8.6	25.2
7	"The Battles and the Sing-offs, Part 2"	April 11, 2014	107	Friday 9:30 p.m.	9.0	28.5
8	"The Battles and the Sing-offs, Part 3"	April 18, 2014	108	Friday 9:30 p.m.	8.9	28.1
9	"Live Season Final"	April 25, 2014	109	Friday 9:30 p.m.	8.9	27.7

== Achievements ==
Team Dima Bilan:

- Polina Bogusevich won the Junior Eurovision Song Contest 2017.
- Kristian Kostov is a runner-up in the fourth season of X Factor Bulgaria, represented Bulgaria in the Eurovision Song Contest 2017 and finished in second place. In January 2018, Kostov won the EBBA Public Choice award. In January 2019, he was one of seven singers who performed in the seventh season of Singer.
- Aygul Valiulina participated in the 8th season of Russian Voice, but did not pass the blind auditions.

Team Pelageya:

- Ragda Khanieva participated in the 8th season of Russian Voice in Sergey Shnurov's team and reached the semi-finals. Also she participated in «The Voice. No Longer Kids» in Egor Kreed's team and was eliminated in the Final's.
- Elizaveta Puris participated in the 9th season of Russian Voice in Basta's team and reached the semi-finals.
- David Sanikidze participated in the «The Voice. No Longer Kids» also in Pelageya's team and he took the 2nd place. Later Sanikidze participated in the 13th season of Russian Voice in Hibla Gerzmava's team and won in the SuperFinal.
- Arina Danilova participated in the 10th season of Russian Voice in Leonid Agutin's team and was eliminated in the Battle's.

Team Maxim Fadeev:

- Alisa Kozhikina participated in the Junior Eurovision Song Contest 2014 and she took the 5th place. Later she participated in «The Voice. No Longer Kids» in Dima Bilan's team and was eliminated in the Battle's.
- Grant Melikyan participated in the «The Voice. No Longer Kids» in Polina Gagarina's team and was eliminated in the Battle's.
- Diana Khitarova participated in the «The Voice. No Longer Kids» in Dima Bilan's team and was eliminated in the semi-final.
- Viktoria Solomakhina participated in the 11th season of Russian Voice in Polina Gagarina's team and won in the SuperFinal.
