= The Voice (Russian TV series) season 9 =

The Voice
- Season 9
- Presented by: Dmitry Nagiyev
- Coaches: Basta; Polina Gagarina; Sergey Shnurov; Valeriy Syutkin
- Winner: Yana Gabbasova
- Winning coach: Polina Gagarina
- Runner-up: Oleg Akkuratov

Release
- Original network: Channel One
- Original release: October 9 – December 30, 2020

Season chronology
- ← Previous; Season 8 Next → Season 10

The ninth season of the Russian reality talent show The Voice premiered on October 9, 2020, on Channel One. Dmitry Nagiev returned as the show's presenter. On August 17, 2020, Channel One announced that Basta, Polina Gagarina, Sergey Shnurov, and Valeriy Syutkin became the coaches.

Yana Gabbasova was announced the winner on December 30, 2020, marking Polina Gagarina's first win as a coach after four attempts and the first female coach to win in the show's history. At age 17, Gabbasova became the youngest winner in the show's history surpassing Darya Antonyuk at 20. Also, Yana became the 5th winner in the show's history to have been just a one-chair turn in the blind auditions.

== Coaches and presenter ==
The Voice season 9 coaches and presenter

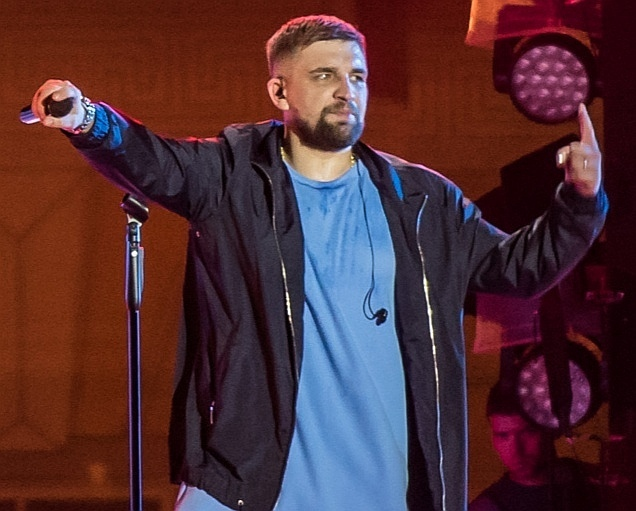
Basta

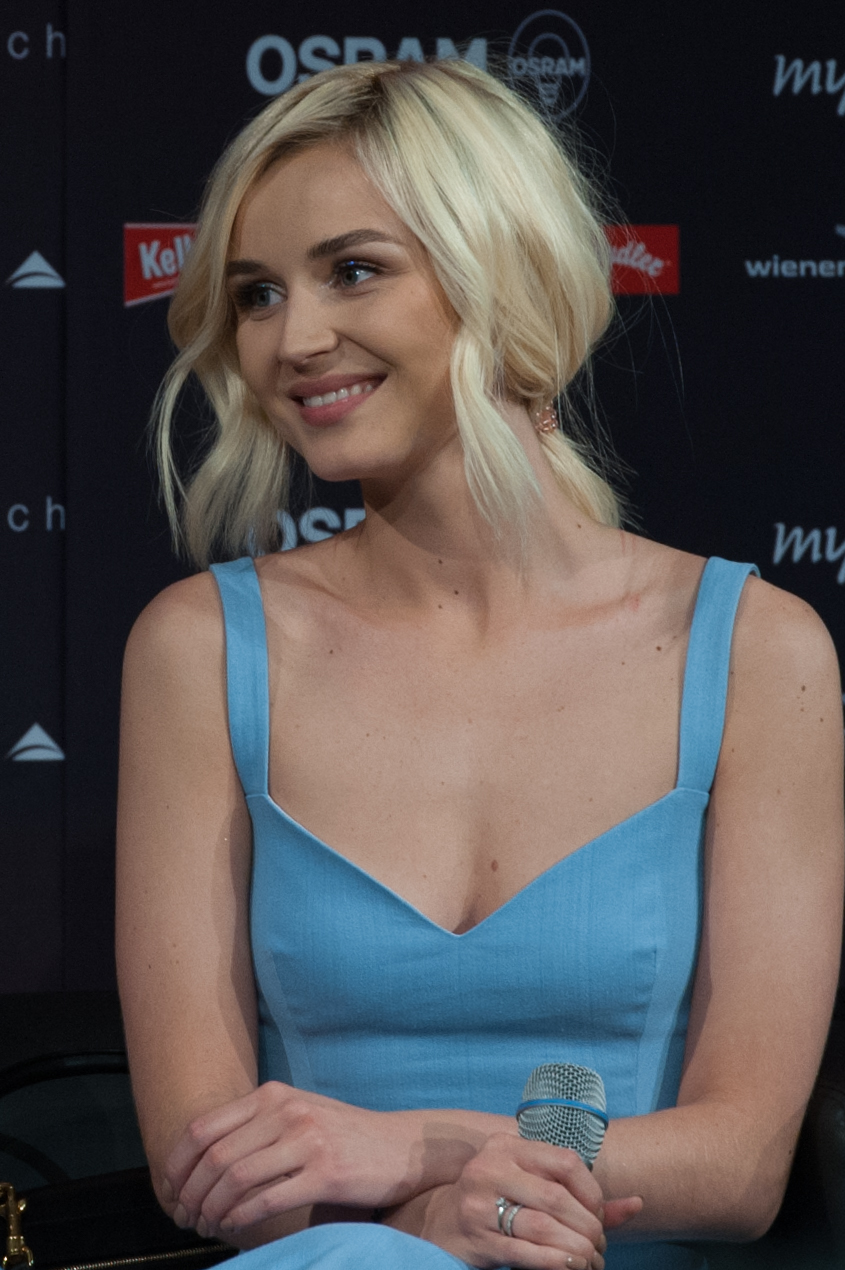
Polina Gagarina

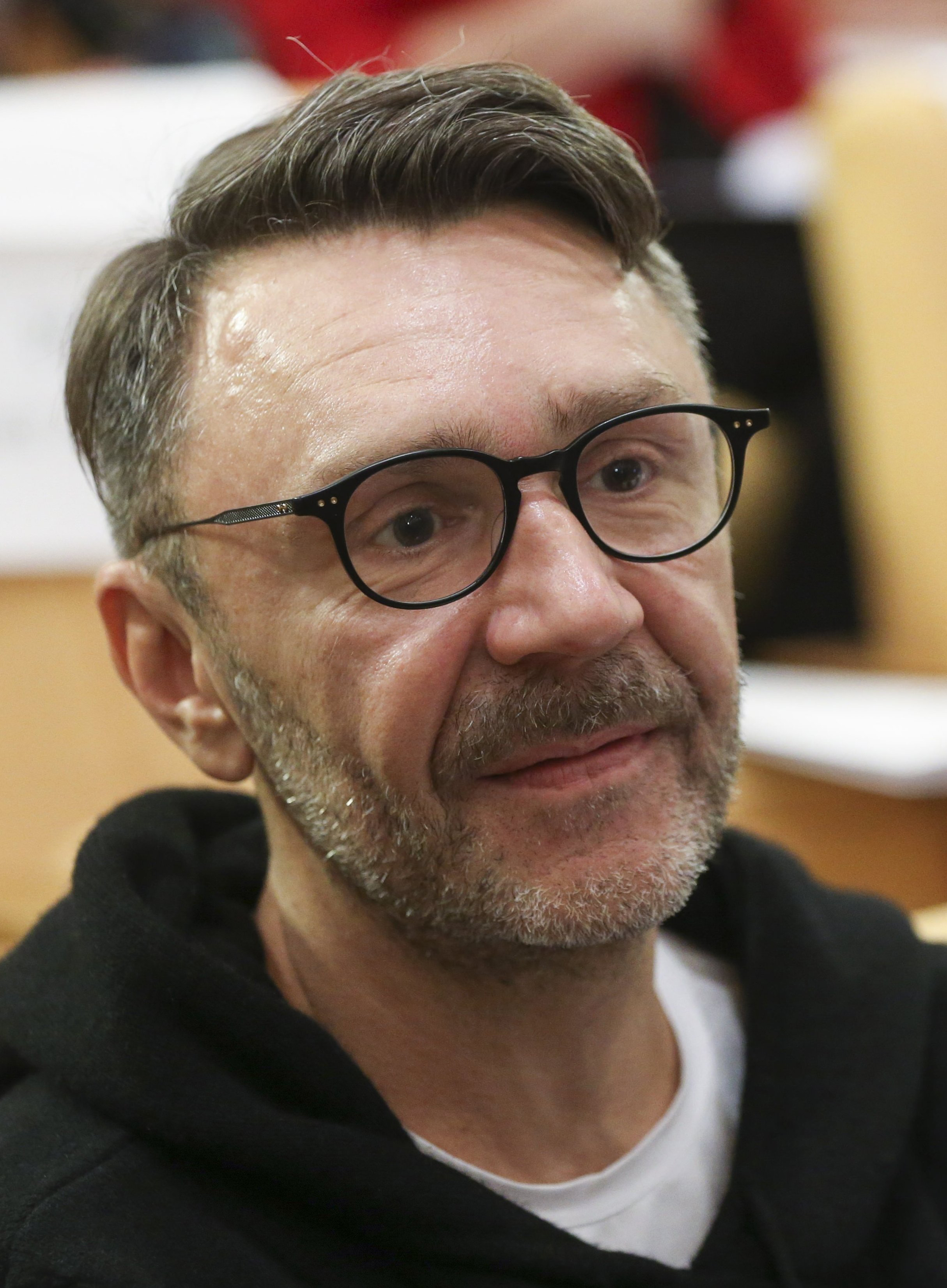
Sergey Shnurov

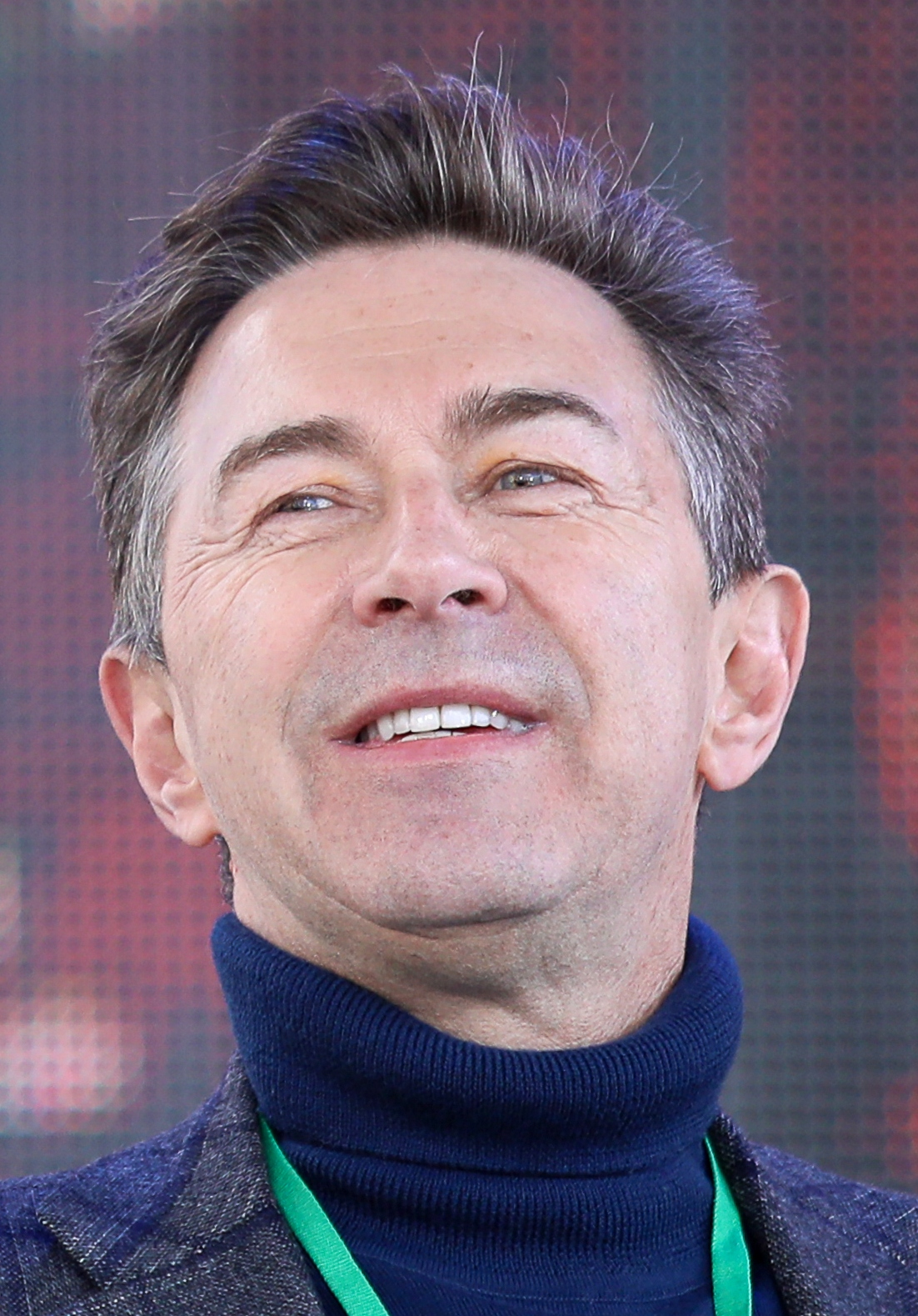
Valeriy Syutkin

On August 17, 2020, Channel One announced that Polina Gagarina, Sergey Shnurov and Valeriy Syutkin will be rejoined as the coaches by Basta who returned after a one-season break and replaced Konstantin Meladze.

Dmitry Nagiyev will return for his 9th season as the presenter.

== Teams ==
Colour key

- Winner
- Runner-up
- Third place
- Fourth place
- Eliminated in the Semifinal
- Eliminated in the Quarterfinal
- Stolen in the Knockout rounds
- Eliminated in the Knockout rounds
- Eliminated in the Battle rounds

Coaches	Top 48 artists				
Basta					
Basta	Vasily Pasechnik	Elizaveta Puris	Yuri Gordienko	~~Fantine Pritula~~	Sergey Zamkov
Basta	Alexandra Budnikova	Marina Strokachenko	Kristina Svetlichnaya	Maxim Kokovin	Alexandra Boldareva
Basta	Gulshan Begimov	Yulia Lunegova	Ivan Avakov		
Polina Gagarina					
Polina Gagarina	Yana Gabbasova	Kirill Suslov	Nadezhda Samkova	Gor Ispiryan	Safael Mishiev
Polina Gagarina	Kristina Korolkova	Alexandra Mostovyak	Ioannis Kofopulos	Daniel Dudin	Randi Hunko Torres
Polina Gagarina	Ivan Kharitonov	Ksenia Kolambatskaya	Alexandra Slavgorodskaya		
Sergey Shnurov					
Sergey Shnurov	Dmitry Vengerov	Maria Rusakova	Zhan Milimerov	~~Nadezhda Samkova~~	~~Yuri Gordienko~~
Sergey Shnurov	Bogdan Kiyashko	Leila Muradova	Anna Alexandrova	Evgeniy Panchokhin	Olga Dianova
Sergey Shnurov	Oksana Ustina	Igor Zavazalskiy	Roman Arkhipov		
Valeriy Syutkin					
Valeriy Syutkin	Oleg Akkuratov	Suren Platonov	Fantine Pritula	~~Dmitry Vengerov~~	Alexandr Yelovskikh
Valeriy Syutkin	Elene Ninidze	Mikhail Zhigalyov	Ksenia Pavroz	Oleg Sherin	Alexey Lysenko
Valeriy Syutkin	Ruslan Vorotnikov	Sarkis Edvards	Anastasia Shugaley		

== Blind auditions ==
The feature The Best coach of the season (in each episode) was applied again this season.

Colour key

✔	Coach pressed "I WANT YOU" button
✔	Coach pressed "I WANT YOU", despite the lack places in his/her team
	Artist defaulted to a coach's team
	Artist picked a coach's team
	Artist eliminated with no coach pressing their button

The coaches performed "В "Голосе" – все!" at the start of the show.

Episode	Order	Artist	Age	Origin	Song	Coach's and artist's choices			
Episode	Order	Artist	Age	Origin	Song	Basta	Gagarina	Shnurov	Syutkin
Episode 1 (Note: Sergey Shnurov is The best coach of episode 1.) (October 9)	1	Fantine Pritula	36	Moscow	"I'm Every Woman"	✔	✔	✔	✔
Episode 1 (October 9)	2	Ivan Kharitonov	17	Sergiyev Posad, Moscow oblast	"Комета"	—	✔	—	—
Episode 1 (October 9)	3	Alina Viardo	26	Pskov, Pskov oblast	"Плот"	—	—	—	—
Episode 1 (October 9)	4	Maria Rusakova	25	Omsk, Omsk oblast	"Holding Out for a Hero"	✔	✔	✔	✔
Episode 1 (October 9)	5	Oleg Sherin	24	Novosibirsk	"Отшумели летние дожди"	—	—	—	✔
Episode 1 (October 9)	6	Gor Ispiryan	34	Aginskoye, Zabaykalsky Krai	"I Want to Break Free"	—	✔	✔	—
Episode 1 (October 9)	7	Natalia Afanasyeva	39	Moscow	"Паруса"	—	—	—	—
Episode 1 (October 9)	8	Alexander Yelovskikh	36	Beryozovsky, Sverdlovsk Oblast	"Путь к свету"	—	✔	—	✔
Episode 1 (October 9)	9	Bogdan Kiyashko	28	Kirov	"Bang Bang (My Baby Shot Me Down)"	✔	✔	✔	—
Episode 1 (October 9)	10	Eleonora Nosova	23	Raduzhny, Yugra	"Fighter"	—	—	—	—
Episode 1 (October 9)	11	Olga Dianova	25	Ryazan, Ryazan oblast	"Колыбельная"	—	—	✔	—
Episode 2 (Note: Sergey Shnurov is The best coach of episode 2.) (October 16)	1	Evgeniy Panchokhin	30	Mostovskoy, Krasnodar Krai	«Розпрягайте, хлопці, коні»	—	—	✔	—
Episode 2 (October 16)	2	Ksenia Pavroz	40	Kaliningrad	«Proud Mary»	—	✔	—	✔
Episode 2 (October 16)	3	Kristina Korolkova	33	Székesfehérvár, Hungary	«Sing It Back»	✔	✔	✔	✔
Episode 2 (October 16)	4	Dzhulietta Mineeva	28	Kaluga	«Падаю в небо»	—	—	—	—
Episode 2 (October 16)	5	Safael Mishiev	27	Baku, Azerbaijan	«Reckoning Song (One Day)»	✔	✔	—	—
Episode 2 (October 16)	6	Sergey Zamkov	41	Moscow	«Rock and Roll»	✔	✔	✔	✔
Episode 2 (October 16)	7	Anna Mass'	37	Kolpino	«Не отпускай»	—	—	—	—
Episode 2 (October 16)	8	Alexandra Boldareva	18	Rostov-on-Don	«Shallow»	✔	✔	—	✔
Episode 2 (October 16)	9	Evgeniy Yuzhin	35	Saint-Petersburg	«Напрасные слова»	—	—	—	—
Episode 2 (October 16)	10	Elene Ninidze	25	Tbilisi, Georgia	«What's Up?»	—	—	✔	✔
Episode 2 (October 16)	11	Rozalina Bevzyuk	18	Mozdok	«Dance Monkey»	—	—	—	—
Episode 2 (October 16)	12	Igor Zavazalskiy	25	Vladimir	«Что происходит?»	—	—	✔	—
Episode 3 (Note: Basta is The best coach of episode 3.) (October 23)	1	Yulia Lunegova	22	Perm	«Highway to Hell»	✔	✔	✔	✔
Episode 3 (October 23)	2	Ioannis Kofopulos	44	Thessaloniki, Greece	«Misirlou»	—	✔	—	—
Episode 3 (October 23)	3	Olga Kord	31	Akhtubinsk	«Манхэттен»	—	—	—	—
Episode 3 (October 23)	4	Suren Platonov	18	Moscow	«Parlami d'amore, Mariù»	—	✔	—	✔
Episode 3 (October 23)	5	Alexandra Budnikova	18	Moscow	«Пьяное солнце»	✔	✔	✔	✔
Episode 3 (October 23)	6	Dmitry Vengerov	33	Volgograd	«Take On Me»	✔	✔	✔	✔
Episode 3 (October 23)	7	Sasha Vista	54	Moscow	«Моя любовь»	—	—	—	—
Episode 3 (October 23)	8	Anastasia Shugaley	33	Talmenka, Altai Krai	«Летела гагара»	—	—	—	✔
Episode 3 (October 23)	9	Svetlana Kim	27	Vladivostok	«I Wanna Dance with Somebody (Who Loves Me)»	—	—	—	—
Episode 3 (October 23)	10	Ivan Avakov	39	Volgodonsk	«911»	✔	✔	✔	✔
Episode 3 (October 23)	11	Leila Alekperova	27	Moscow	«Индиго»/«Waltz in e minor»	—	—	—	—
Episode 3 (October 23)	12	Roman Arkhipov	37	Moscow	«Love Hurts»	—	—	✔	—
Episode 4 (Note: Basta is The best coach of episode 4.) (October 30)	1	Elena Freiman	19	Moscow	«Something's Got a Hold on Me»	—	—	—	—
Episode 4 (October 30)	2	Vasily Pasechnik	25	Sovetskoye, Saratov oblast	«Yesterday»	✔	✔	✔	✔
Episode 4 (October 30)	3	Oksana Ustina	28	Kazakhstan	«Драмы больше нет»	—	✔	✔	✔
Episode 4 (October 30)	4	Andrey Kutuzov	40	Nizhniy Novgorod	«Младшая сестрёнка»/«На улице дождик»	—	—	—	—
Episode 4 (October 30)	5	Oleg Akkuratov	30	Yeisk	«Baby, I Love You»	✔	✔	✔	✔
Episode 4 (October 30)	6	Stanislav Rebitsky	32	Revda, Sverdlovsk oblast	«Я не могу без тебя»	—	—	—	—
Episode 4 (October 30)	7	Nadezhda Samkova	36	Krasnoyarsk	«Nella Fantasia»	✔	✔	✔	✔
Episode 4 (October 30)	8	Emil Sales	25	Kaliningrad	«Les Champs-Élysées»	—	—	—	—
Episode 4 (October 30)	9	Elizaveta Puris	16	Moscow	«Is That Alright?»	✔	✔	—	—
Episode 4 (October 30)	10	Ruslan Vorotnikov	35	Ufa	«Не плачь»	—	—	—	✔
Episode 4 (October 30)	11	Ksenia Kolambatskaya	38	Astrakhan	"Alarm"	—	✔	—	✔
Episode 4 (October 30)	12	Daniel Dudin	30	Novokuznetsk	"Starlight"	—	✔	✔	—
Episode 5 (Note: Basta is The best coach of episode 5.) (November 6)	1	Leila Muradova	32	Krasnodar	«Bang Bang»	✔	✔	✔	✔
Episode 5 (November 6)	2	Zhan Milimerov	40	Moscow	«Hotel California»	✔	—	✔	✔
Episode 5 (November 6)	3	Marina Strokachenko	30	Odesa, Ukraine	«Yuh, mein tiere tochter»/«Да, моя голубка»	✔	✔	✔	✔
Episode 5 (November 6)	4	Alisa Supronova	20	Magadan	«Седая ночь»	—	—	—	—
Episode 5 (November 6)	5	Sergey Pakhomov	48	Kaliningrad	«Bensonhurst Blues»	—	—	—	—
Episode 5 (November 6)	6	Anna Alexandrova	33	Rostov-on-Don	«Don't Speak»	—	—	✔	✔
Episode 5 (November 6)	7	Gulshan Begimov	25	Kamenka, Kaluzhskaya Oblast	«Чёрный пистолет»	✔	✔	—	—
Episode 5 (November 6)	8	Polina Kazantseva	30	Saint-Petersburg	«My Love»	—	—	—	—
Episode 5 (November 6)	9	Darya Yanvarina	25	Kirov	«Весь этот мир»	—	—	—	—
Episode 5 (November 6)	10	Kirill Suslov	26	Rzhev, Tverskaya Oblast	«Per te»	—	✔	—	✔
Episode 5 (November 6)	11	Mikhail Zhigalyov	22	Ivanovo	«Ой, то не вечер»	—	—	—	✔
Episode 5 (November 6)	12	Alexandra Mostovyak	17	Moscow	«Someone Like You»	—	✔	—	—
Episode 6 (Note: Basta is The best coach of episode 6.) (November 13)	1	Alexandra Slavgorodskaya	21	Saint-Petersburg	«Somebody to Love»	✔	✔	—	✔
Episode 6 (November 13)	2	Randi Hunko Torres	20	Cuba	«Nutbush City Limits»	✔	✔	✔	—
Episode 6 (November 13)	3	Kristina Svetlichnaya	22	Minsk, Belarus	«Я твоя»	✔	—	—	—
Episode 6 (November 13)	4	Andrey Antuzhan	42	Oslo, Norway	«Come with Me Now»	—	—	—	—
Episode 6 (November 13)	5	Yuri Gordienko	27	Saint-Petersburg	«Игрушки»	✔	✔	✔	✔
Episode 6 (November 13)	6	Yulia Loshkaryova	32	Zimogorye	«La Alegría»	—	—	Team full	—
Episode 6 (November 13)	7	Alexey Lysenko	35	Komsomolsk-on-Amur	«Воскресенье»	—	✔	Team full	✔
Episode 6 (November 13)	8	Yana Gabbasova	17	Neftekamsk	«My Heart Will Go On»	—	✔	Team full	—
Episode 6 (November 13)	9	Maxim Kokovin	24	Koryazhma, Arkhangelsk Oblast	«Always»	✔	Team full	Team full	✔
Episode 6 (November 13)	10	Yana Gurko	23	Yekaterinburg	«Белая ночь»	Team full	Team full	Team full	—
Episode 6 (November 13)	11	Ekaterina Yamshchikova	30	Ufa	«Send My Love (To Your New Lover)/«Не из саду было...»	Team full	Team full	Team full	—
Episode 6 (November 13)	12	Sarkis Edvards	43	Armenia	«You Can Leave Your Hat On»	✔	✔	✔	✔

== The Battles ==
The Battle Rounds will be starting on November 20, 2020. No steal were available. Contestants who win their battle would advance to the Knockout rounds.

Colour key

Artist won the Battle and advanced to the Knockouts
Artist lost the Battle and was eliminated

Episode	Coach	Order	Winner	Song	Loser
Episode 7 (November 20) (Note: Basta is The best coach of episode 7.)	Sergey Shnurov	1	Maria Rusakova	«Улетай, туча»	Anna Alexandrova
Episode 7 (November 20)	Valeriy Syutkin	2	Suren Platonov	«Can't Take My Eyes Off You»	Ksenia Pavroz
Episode 7 (November 20)	Basta	3	Vasily Pasechnik	«Единственная»	Kristina Svetlichnaya
Episode 7 (November 20)	Sergey Shnurov	4	Zhan Milimerov	«Bella ciao»	Evgeniy Panchokhin
Episode 7 (November 20)	Polina Gagarina	5	Kristina Korolkova	«The Time of My Life»	Ioannis Kofopulos
Episode 7 (November 20)	Polina Gagarina	6	Yana Gabbasova	«Птиченька»	Daniel Dudin
Episode 7 (November 20)	Valeriy Syutkin	7	Dmitry Vengerov	«Glorious»	Oleg Sherin
Episode 7 (November 20)	Polina Gagarina	8	Gor Ispiryan	«Maniac»	Randi Hunko Torres
Episode 7 (November 20)	Basta	9	Alexandra Budnikova	«Весна»	Maxim Kokovin
Episode 7 (November 20)	Sergey Shnurov	10	Bogdan Kiyashko	«Белые розы»	Olga Dianova
Episode 7 (November 20)	Basta	11	Elizaveta Puris	«Nothing Breaks Like a Heart»	Alexandra Boldareva
Episode 7 (November 20)	Valeriy Syutkin	12	Elene Ninidze	«Сумерки»	Alexey Lysenko
Episode 8 (November 27) (Note: Basta is The best coach of episode 8.)	Polina Gagarina	1	Alexandra Mostovyak	«Любовь настала»	Ivan Kharitonov
Episode 8 (November 27)	Valeriy Syutkin	2	Oleg Akkuratov	«Fly Me to the Moon»	Ruslan Vorotnikov
Episode 8 (November 27)	Basta	3	Fantine Pritula	«Love the Way You Lie» / «Я или ты»	Gulshan Begimov
Episode 8 (November 27)	Sergey Shnurov	4	Leila Muradova	«Чики»	Oksana Ustina
Episode 8 (November 27)	Polina Gagarina	5	Safael Mishiev	«Карусель»	Ksenia Kolambatskaya
Episode 8 (November 27)	Valeriy Syutkin	6	Alexandr Yelovskikh	«Желаю тебе»	Sarkis Edvards
Episode 8 (November 27)	Basta	7	Sergey Zamkov	«Numb»	Yulia Lunegova
Episode 8 (November 27)	Sergey Shnurov	8	Yuri Gordienko	«Нажми на кнопку»	Igor Zavazalskiy
Episode 8 (November 27)	Polina Gagarina	9	Kirill Suslov	«Always on My Mind»	Alexandra Slavgorodskaya
Episode 8 (November 27)	Valeriy Syutkin	10	Mikhail Zhigalyov	«Расскажите, птицы»	Anastasia Shugaley
Episode 8 (November 27)	Basta	11	Marina Strokachenko	«Я — это ты»	Ivan Avakov
Episode 8 (November 27)	Sergey Shnurov	12	Nadezhda Samkova	«Sad but True»	Roman Arkhipov

== The Knockouts ==
The Knockout Rounds started on December 4, 2020. Similar to the previous season, each coach pairs three artists into one knockout with only one contestant from the trio advances to the next round and also can steal one losing artist from another coach. The top 12 contestants moved on to the Quarterfinal.

Colour key

Artist won the Knockout and advanced to the Quarterfinal
Artist lost the Knockout but was stolen by another coach and advanced to the Quarterfinal
Artist lost the Knockout and was eliminated

Episode	Coach	Order	Song	Artists		Song	'Steal' result			
Episode	Coach	Order	Song	Winner	Losers	Song	Basta	Gagarina	Shnurov	Syutkin
Episode 9 (December 4) (Note: Sergey Shnurov is The best coach of episode 9.)	Polina Gagarina	1	«Люблю я макароны»	Kirill Suslov	Kristina Korolkova	«Я не умею танцевать» / «I Can't Dance»	—	—N/a	—	—
Episode 9 (December 4)	Polina Gagarina	1	«Люблю я макароны»	Kirill Suslov	Alexandra Mostovyak	«Dancing Queen»	—	—N/a	—	—
Episode 9 (December 4)	Valeriy Syutkin	2	«Ночной каприз»	Suren Platonov	Mikhail Zhigalyov	«Не отрекаются, любя»	—	—	—	—N/a
Episode 9 (December 4)	Valeriy Syutkin	2	«Ночной каприз»	Suren Platonov	Dmitry Vengerov	«Полковнику никто не пишет»	—	—	✔	—N/a
Episode 9 (December 4)	Sergey Shnurov	3	«Помоги мне»	Maria Rusakova	Nadezhda Samkova	«Жить в твоей голове»	—	✔	Team full	—
Episode 9 (December 4)	Sergey Shnurov	3	«Помоги мне»	Maria Rusakova	Leila Muradova	«Un-Break My Heart»	—	Team full	Team full	—
Episode 9 (December 4)	Basta	4	«Танцы на стёклах»	Elizaveta Puris	Marina Strokachenko	«I'll Never Love Again»	—N/a	Team full	Team full	—
Episode 9 (December 4)	Basta	4	«Танцы на стёклах»	Elizaveta Puris	Alexandra Budnikova	«Everything's Alright»	—N/a	Team full	Team full	—
Episode 10 (December 11) (Note: Basta is The best coach of episode 10.)	Polina Gagarina	1	«Романс»	Yana Gabbasova	Safael Mishiev	«Rehab»	—	Team full	Team full	—
Episode 10 (December 11)	Polina Gagarina	1	«Романс»	Yana Gabbasova	Gor Ispiryan	«Bad Romance»	—	Team full	Team full	—
Episode 10 (December 11)	Basta	2	«Livin' on a Prayer»	Vasily Pasechnik	Sergey Zamkov	«Вот пуля просвистела...»	—N/a	Team full	Team full	—
Episode 10 (December 11)	Basta	2	«Livin' on a Prayer»	Vasily Pasechnik	Fantine Pritula	«Половинка»	—N/a	Team full	Team full	✔
Episode 10 (December 11)	Valeriy Syutkin	3	«Ходит песенка по кругу»	Oleg Akkuratov	Alexandr Yelovskikh	«Зачарованная моя»	—	Team full	Team full	Team full
Episode 10 (December 11)	Valeriy Syutkin	3	«Ходит песенка по кругу»	Oleg Akkuratov	Elene Ninidze	«Sunrise»	—	Team full	Team full	Team full
Episode 10 (December 11)	Sergey Shnurov	4	«Мадонна»	Zhan Milimerov	Bogdan Kiyashko	«Молодые ветра»	—	Team full	Team full	Team full
Episode 10 (December 11)	Sergey Shnurov	4	«Мадонна»	Zhan Milimerov	Yuri Gordienko	«Ланфрен — ланфра»	✔	Team full	Team full	Team full

== Live shows ==
Colour key:

Artist was saved
Artist was eliminated

=== Week 1: Top 12 — Quarterfinal (December 18) ===
The Live Top 12 Quarterfinal comprised episode 11. The top twelve artists performed, with two artists from each team advancing based on the sum of the viewers' and coach's votes.

Episode	Coach	Order	Artist	Song	Coach's vote (/100%)	Public's vote (/100%)	Votes' sum	Result
Episode 11 (December 18)	Valery Syutkin	1	Fantine Pritula	"Virtual Insanity"	20%	8,3%	28,3%	Eliminated
Episode 11 (December 18)	Valery Syutkin	2	Oleg Akkuratov	"Une vie d'amour"/"Вечная любовь"	50%	76,3%	126,3%	Advanced
Episode 11 (December 18)	Valery Syutkin	3	Suren Platonov	"We Are the Champions"	30%	15,4%	45,4%	Advanced
Episode 11 (December 18)	Polina Gagarina	4	Kirill Suslov	"Sway"	30%	21,4%	51,4%	Advanced
Episode 11 (December 18)	Polina Gagarina	5	Nadezhda Samkova	"Frozen"	20%	23,9%	43,9%	Eliminated
Episode 11 (December 18)	Polina Gagarina	6	Yana Gabbasova	"Не для тебя"	50%	54,7%	104,7%	Advanced
Episode 11 (December 18)	Sergey Shnurov	7	Dmitry Vengerov	"Кукла колдуна"	20%	54,3%	74,3%	Advanced
Episode 11 (December 18)	Sergey Shnurov	8	Maria Rusakova	"Знаешь ли ты?"	50%	14,9%	64,9%	Advanced
Episode 11 (December 18)	Sergey Shnurov	9	Zhan Milimerov	"From Souvenirs to Souvenirs"	30%	30,8%	60,8%	Eliminated
Episode 11 (December 18)	Basta	10	Vasily Pasechnik	"Милая"	30%	42,6%	72,6%	Advanced
Episode 11 (December 18)	Basta	11	Elizaveta Puris	"La vie en rose"	50%	20,7%	70,7%	Advanced
Episode 11 (December 18)	Basta	12	Yuri Gordienko	"Where the Wild Roses Grow"	20%	36,7%	56,7%	Eliminated

=== Week 2: Top 8 — Semifinal (December 25) ===
The top eight artists performed on December 25, 2020, with one artist from each team advancing to the Final based on the sum of the viewers' and coach's votes

Episode	Coach	Order	Artist	Song	Coach's vote (/100%)	Public's vote (/100%)	Votes' sum	Result
Episode 12 (December 25)	Polina Gagarina	1	Kirill Suslov	"Лебединая верность"	40%	36,1%	76,1%	Eliminated
Episode 12 (December 25)	Polina Gagarina	2	Yana Gabbasova	"О нём"	60%	63,9%	123,9%	Votes' summa
Episode 12 (December 25)	Sergey Shnurov	3	Maria Rusakova	"Позвони мне, позвони" / "Я давно не верю в телефоны..."	40%	16,7%	56,7%	Eliminated
Episode 12 (December 25)	Sergey Shnurov	4	Dmitry Vengerov	"Районы - кварталы"	60%	83,3%	143,3%	Votes' summa
Episode 12 (December 25)	Valery Syutkin	5	Suren Platonov	"Io ti darò di più"	40%	21,5%	61,5%	Eliminated
Episode 12 (December 25)	Valery Syutkin	6	Oleg Akkuratov	"I Believe I Can Fly"	60%	78,5%	138,5%	Votes' summa
Episode 12 (December 25)	Basta	7	Elizaveta Puris	"Ой, то не вечер"	40%	43,4%	83,4%	Eliminated
Episode 12 (December 25)	Basta	8	Vasily Pasechnik	"Без названия"	60%	56,6%	116,6%	Votes' summa

Trios
Order	Performer	Song
12.1	Grigory Leps, Kirill Suslov and Yana Gabbasova	"Вьюга"
12.2	Lolita, Maria Rusakova and Dmitry Vengerov	"Ориентация — Север"
12.3	Ildar Abdrazakov, Suren Platonov and Oleg Akkuratov	"Sorry Seems to Be the Hardest Word"
12.4	Ivan Dorn, Elizaveta Puris and Vasily Pasechnik	"Синими, жёлтыми, красными"

=== Week 3: Final (December 30) ===
Coach	Artist	Order	Duet Song (with Coach)	Order	Solo Song (no.1)	Order	Solo Song (no.2)	Result	
Valery Syutkin	Oleg Akkuratov	1	"Космический рок-н-ролл"	5	"Мы разбиваемся"	9	"Let It Snow" / "В лесу родилась ёлочка"	Second place	48,9%
Sergey Shnurov	Dmitry Vengerov	2	"Просто"	6	"Я свободен"	10	"Давай за"	Third place	
Polina Gagarina	Yana Gabbasova	3	"Зима"	7	"Je t'aime"	11	"Звенит январская вьюга"	Winner	51.1%
Basta	Vasily Pasecnik	4	"Сансара"	8	"Офицеры"	Eliminated		Fourth place	

Non-competition performances
Order	Performer	Song
13.1	Vasily Pasechnik	"When a Man Loves a Woman"
13.2	Yana Gabbasova (winner)	"Звенит январская вьюга"
13.3	Top 4 artists with coaches	"Здесь проигравших нет"

== Best Coach ==
Colour key

- Best Coach
- Second place
- Third place
- Fourth place
- Episode's Best Coach

Coach	Public's vote _{(per episode)}											Result
Coach	#1	#2	#3	#4	#5	#6	#7	#8	#9	#10	Av.	Result
Basta	26%	29%	32%	34%	36%	34%	33%	32%	27%	28%	31%	Best coach
Sergey Shnurov	31%	32%	27%	24%	29%	25%	28%	27%	32%	26%	28%	Second place
Polina Gagarina	29%	26%	25%	23%	18%	25%	22%	20%	20%	23%	23%	Third place
Valeriy Syutkin	14%	13%	16%	19%	17%	16%	17%	21%	21%	23%	18%	Fourth place

== Reception ==
=== Rating ===
Episode		Original airdate	Production	Time slot (UTC+3)	Viewers (by million)	Audience		Source
Episode		Original airdate	Production	Time slot (UTC+3)	Viewers (by million)	Rating	Share	Source
1	"The Blind Auditions Premiere"	October 9, 2020	901	Friday 9:30 p.m.	3.56	5.0	19.2%	
2	"The Blind Auditions, Part 2"	October 16, 2020	902	Friday 9:30 p.m.	—	4.8	17,4%	
3	"The Blind Auditions, Part 3"	October 23, 2020	903	Friday 9:30 p.m.	—	5.0	18.2%	https://mediascope.net/data/
4	"The Blind Auditions, Part 4"	October 30, 2020	904	Friday 9:30 p.m.	—	5.1	18.8%	
5	"The Blind Auditions, Part 5"	November 6, 2020	905	Friday 9:30 p.m.	—	5.1	18.3%	
6	"The Blind Auditions, Part 6"	November 13, 2020	906	Friday 9:30 p.m.	—	5.1	18.3%	
7	"The Battles Premiere"	November 20, 2020	907	Friday 9:30 p.m.	—	4.7	17.5%	
8	"The Battles, Part 2"	November 27, 2020	908	Friday 9:30 p.m.	—	4.9	17.9%	
9	"The Knockouts Premiere"	December 4, 2020	909	Friday 9:30 p.m.	—	4.6	16.2%	
10	"The Knockouts, Part 2"	December 11, 2020	910	Friday 9:30 p.m.	—	4.4	15.9%	
