= The Voice (Russian TV series) season 8 =

The Voice
- Season 8
- Presented by: Dmitry Nagiev
- Coaches: Valery Syutkin; Polina Gagarina; Sergey Shnurov; Konstantin Meladze
- Winner: Aскер Бербеков
- Winning coach: Konstantin Meladze
- Runner-up: Anton Tokarev

Release
- Original network: Channel One
- Original release: October 11, 2019 – January 1, 2020

Season chronology
- ← Previous; Season 7 Next → Season 9

The eighth season of the Russian reality talent show The Voice premiered on October 11, 2019, on Channel One. Dmitry Nagiev returned as the show's presenter. On August 26, 2019, Channel One announced that Valery Syutkin, Polina Gagarina, Sergey Shnurov, and Konstantin Meladze became the coaches.

Asker Berbekov was named winner of the season, marking Konstantin Meladze's second and final win as a coach. With the win of Berbekov, Meladze became the second coach to win multiple seasons, behind Alexander Gradsky. Moreover, Meladze also became the second coach after Gradsky to win consecutive season. In addition, for the first time ever, the final four artists were all male.

== Coaches and presenter ==
The Voice season 8 coaches and presenter

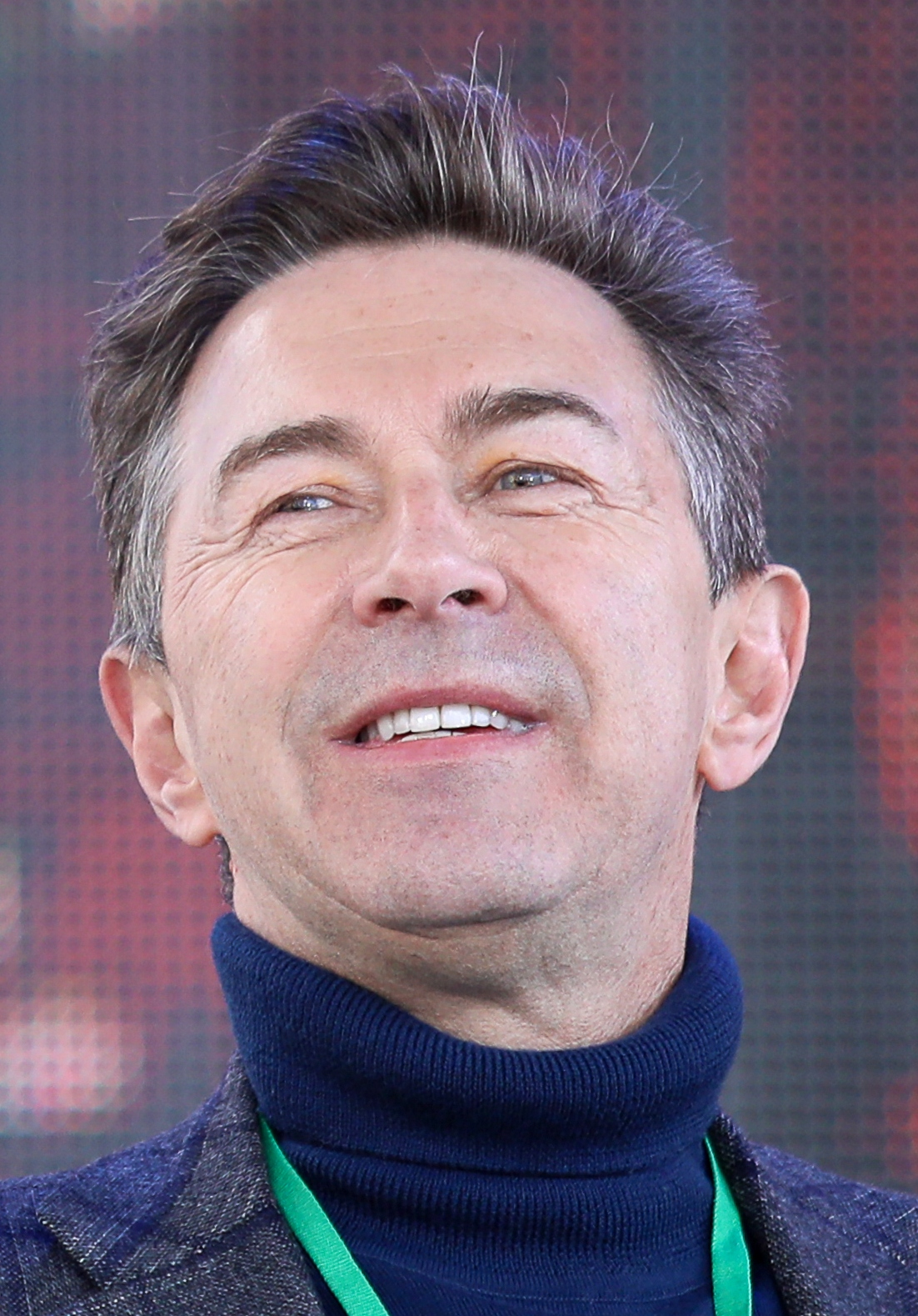
Valery Syutkin

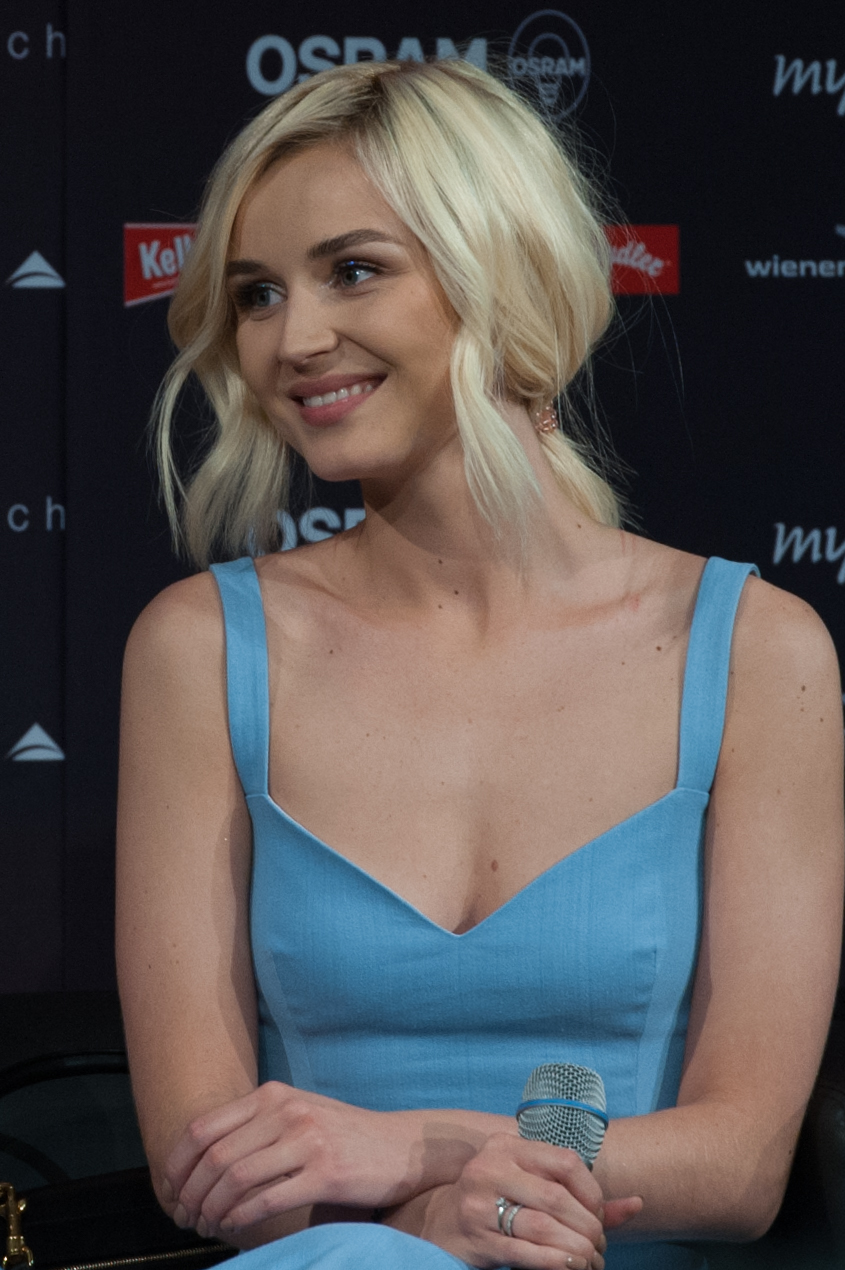
Polina Gagarina

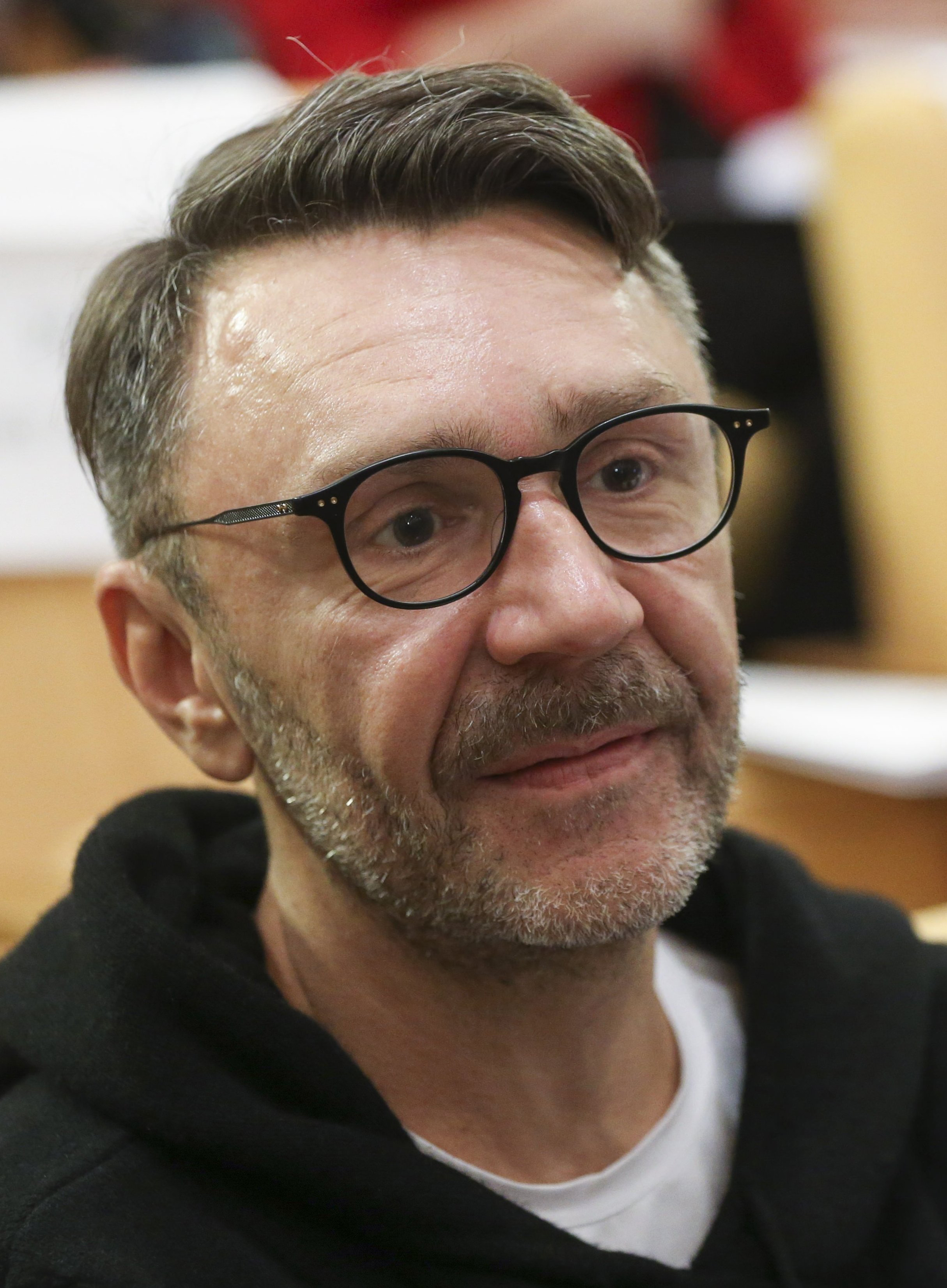
Sergey Shnurov

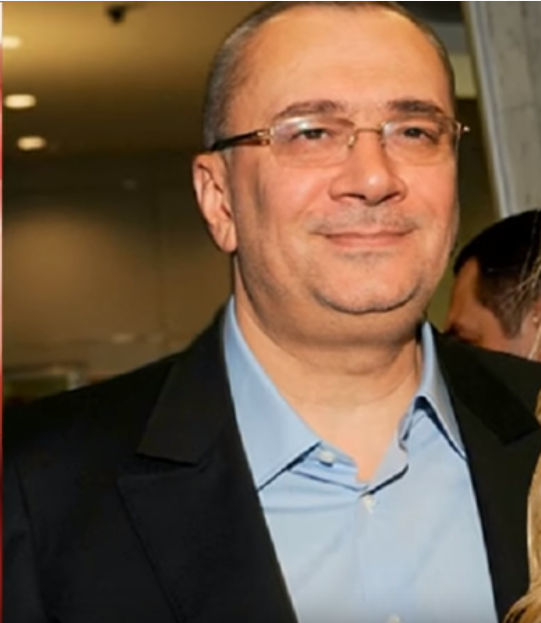
Konstantin Meladze

On August 26, 2019, Channel One announced that Sergey Shnurov and Konstantin Meladze will be rejoined as the coaches by Polina Gagarina, who returned after a two-season break, and Valery Syutkin, who replaced Basta as a new coach for the show.

Dmitry Nagiev returned for his 8th season as the presenter.

== Teams ==
Colour key

- Winner
- Runner-up
- Third place
- Fourth place
- Eliminated in the Semifinal
- Eliminated in the Quarterfinal
- Stolen in the Knockout rounds
- Eliminated in the Knockout rounds
- Eliminated in the Battle rounds

Coaches	Top 48 artists				
Valeriy Syutkin					
Valeriy Syutkin	Arsen Mukendi	Elimdar Seydosmanov	Lilia Veltman	Anastasia Yust	Tatyana Gayvoronskaya
Valeriy Syutkin	Egor Muskat	~~Nurzhigit Subankulov~~	Karin Soyref	Viktoria Karachun	Liana Meister
Valeriy Syutkin	Yury Shurkhovetsky	Daniil Danilevsky	Vladimir Konovalov		
Polina Gagarina					
Polina Gagarina	Iv Nabiev	Alana Chochieva	Anastasia Markova	Iva Todorova	Ekaterina Steblina
Polina Gagarina	Andrew Grunge	~~Lilia Veltman~~	Olga Urazgalieva	Nika Prokopyeva	Felix Kotlo
Polina Gagarina	Rinat Albikov	Maxim Larichev	Emily Cooper		
Sergey Shnurov					
Sergey Shnurov	Anton Tokarev	Ragda Khanieva	Svetlana Mamresheva	Arseny Kurchanin	Ildar Abdullin
Sergey Shnurov	Irina Chuvakova	~~Iv Nabiev~~	Filipp Lebedev	Maxim Subachev	Stanislav Moshkin
Sergey Shnurov	Dmitry Klinaev	Konstantin Strukov	Milana Rakhmanova		
Konstantin Meladze					
Konstantin Meladze	Аскер Бербеков	Nurzhigit Subankulov	Daniil Korolev	Elizaveta Shaluba	Valeria Mironova
Konstantin Meladze	Natalya Sidortsova	~~Svetlana Mamresheva~~	Polina Tyrina	Anastasia Badyina	Inna Sadayan
Konstantin Meladze	Roman Voloznev	Vrezh Kirakosyan	Renata Shtifel		

== Blind auditions ==
The feature The Best coach of the season (in each episode) was applied again this season.

Colour key

✔	Coach pressed "I WANT YOU" button
✔	Coach pressed "I WANT YOU" button, despite the lack of places in his/her team
	Artist defaulted to a coach's team
	Artist picked a coach's team
	Artist eliminated with no coach pressing their button

The coaches performed "Геленджик" at the start of the show.

Episode	Order	Artist	Age	Origin	Song	Coach's and artist's choices			
Episode	Order	Artist	Age	Origin	Song	Syutkin	Gagarina	Shnurov	Meladze
Episode 1 (Note: Sergey Shnurov is The best coach of episode 1.) (October 11)	1	Ildar Abdullin	24	Gai, Orenburg Oblast	"I Put a Spell on You"	✔	✔	✔	—
Episode 1 (October 11)	2	Tatyana Gayvorovskaya	27	Rostov-on-Don	"Я не умею танцевать"	✔	✔	✔	—
Episode 1 (October 11)	3	Ksenia Orlova	28	Belovo, Kemerovo Oblast	"Дикая вода"	—	—	—	—
Episode 1 (October 11)	4	Felix Kotlo	18	Moscow	"Englishman in New York"	✔	✔	—	—
Episode 1 (October 11)	5	Elizaveta Shaluba	19	Novorossiysk, Krasnodar krai	"Романс"	✔	✔	✔	✔
Episode 1 (October 11)	6	Viktoria Karachun	25	Minsk, Belarus	"Мар, дяндя"	✔	—	—	—
Episode 1 (October 11)	7	Karina Evn	22	Moscow	"Blow Your Mind"	—	—	—	—
Episode 1 (October 11)	8	Konstantin Strukov	31	Voronezh, Voronezh oblast	"Sugar"	✔	✔	✔	✔
Episode 1 (October 11)	9	Rushana Rakhmanona	27	Tashkent, Uzbekistan	"Не отрекаются любя"	—	—	—	—
Episode 1 (October 11)	10	Anastasia Badyina	25	Sayansk, Irkutsk oblast	"Спектакль окончен"	—	—	—	✔
Episode 1 (October 11)	11	Mikhail Mishuris	47	Novosibirsk, Novosibirsk oblast	"Evil"	—	—	—	—
Episode 1 (October 11)	12	Yury Shurkhovetsky	28	Moscow	"Perfect"	✔	—	—	—
Episode 2 (Note: Sergey Shnurov is The best coach of episode 2.) (October 18)	1	Rinat Albikov	30	Tver, Tver oblast	"Torna a Surriento"/"Luna Mezzo"	—	✔	✔	—
Episode 2 (October 18)	2	Ekaterina Osipenko	47	Skhodnya, Moscow oblast	"Мурка"	—	—	—	—
Episode 2 (October 18)	3	Iv Nabiev	33	Maysky, Perm krai	"California Dreamin'"	✔	✔	✔	✔
Episode 2 (October 18)	4	Anastasia Yust	25	Abakan, Khakassia	"Эхо любви"	✔	—	✔	✔
Episode 2 (October 18)	5	Anton Tokarev	24	Moscow	"Leave a Light On"	—	✔	✔	—
Episode 2 (October 18)	6	Vadim Izofatov	47	Omsk, Omsk oblast	"Mess Around"	—	—	—	—
Episode 2 (October 18)	7	Stanislav Moshkin	27	Terney, Primorsky krai	"Мокрые кроссы"	✔	✔	✔	—
Episode 2 (October 18)	8	Yulia Mandriko	40	Belgorod, Belgorod oblast	"The Power of Love"	—	—	—	—
Episode 2 (October 18)	9	Alana Chochieva	17	Vladimir, Vladimir oblast	"Faith"	✔	✔	✔	✔
Episode 2 (October 18)	10	Andrey Zapetsky	31	Bryansk, Bryansk oblast	"Болен тобой"	—	—	—	—
Episode 2 (October 18)	11	Iva Todorova	18	Sofia, Bulgaria	"Back to Black"	—	✔	—	—
Episode 2 (October 18)	12	Аскер Бербеков	28	Baksan, Kabardino-Balkaria	"S.O.S. d'un terrien en détresse"	—	—	—	✔
Episode 3 (Note: Sergey Shnurov is The best coach of episode 3.) (October 25)	1	Irina Chuvakova	32	Moscow	"We Will Rock You"	✔	✔	✔	✔
Episode 3 (October 25)	2	Eduard Dzyuba	32	Ryzdvyany, Stavropol krai	"Твои следы"	—	—	—	—
Episode 3 (October 25)	3	Daniil Korolev	32	Moscow	"Когда молод был"	—	✔	✔	✔
Episode 3 (October 25)	4	Milana Rakhmanova	25	Surgut, Yugra	"Toxic"	✔	✔	✔	✔
Episode 3 (October 25)	5	Natalya Svetlova	52	Ust-Katav, Chelyabinsk oblast	"Мне нравится"	—	—	—	—
Episode 3 (October 25)	6	Maxim Larichev	36	Aleksin, Tula oblast	"S.O.B."	✔	✔	—	—
Episode 3 (October 25)	7	Vladimir Konovalov	31	Lomy, Zabaykalsky krai	"Туманы"	✔	—	—	—
Episode 3 (October 25)	8	Renata Shtifel	26	Kyiv, Ukraine	"Пісня про рушник"	✔	✔	✔	✔
Episode 3 (October 25)	9	Alexander Novichkov	31	Engels, Saratov Oblast	"This Love"	—	—	—	—
Episode 3 (October 25)	10	Liana Meister	39	Moscow	"Ich hob dich zifeel lieb"	✔	—	—	—
Episode 3 (October 25)	11	Valentin Lakodin	42	Penza, Penza oblast	"Mambo Italiano"	—	—	—	—
Episode 3 (October 25)	12	Emily Cooper	17	Ashdod, Israel / Moscow	"Every Breath You Take"	—	✔	—	—
Episode 4 (Note: Sergey Shnurov is The best coach of episode 4.) (November 1)	1	Ekaterina Steblina	28	Moscow	"В городе моём"	✔	✔	—	—
Episode 4 (November 1)	2	Filipp Lebedev	29	Moscow	"Beggin'"	✔	✔	✔	—
Episode 4 (November 1)	3	Dmitry Mosichuk	41	Eindhoven, Netherlands	"Взрослые дочери"	—	—	—	—
Episode 4 (November 1)	4	Valeria Mironova	21	Nizhny Kuranakh, Yakutia	"Poker Face"	✔	✔	✔	✔
Episode 4 (November 1)	5	Maxim Subachev	22	Chelyabinsk, Chelyabinsk oblast	"I Need a Dollar"	✔	✔	✔	—
Episode 4 (November 1)	6	Oleg Shadrin	32	Ekaterinburg, Sverdlovsk oblast	"Как ты живёшь без меня"	—	—	—	—
Episode 4 (November 1)	7	Olga Urazgalieva	27	Irkutsk, Irkutsk oblast	"Halo"	—	✔	—	—
Episode 4 (November 1)	8	Polina Tyrina	27	Nur-Sultan, Kazakhstan	"Не уходи, побудь со мною"	—	—	—	✔
Episode 4 (November 1)	9	Olga Ilyukhina	23	Nizhnevartovsk, Yugra	"Любовь и одиночество"	—	—	—	—
Episode 4 (November 1)	10	Arsen Mukendi	28	Kinshasa, DR Congo	"Superstition"	✔	—	—	—
Episode 4 (November 1)	11	Karin Soyref	24	Gibraltar	"All I Ask"	✔	—	—	—
Episode 4 (November 1)	12	Ruslan Alekhno	37	Bobruysk, Belarus	"Подберу музыку"	—	—	—	—
Episode 5 (Note: Sergey Shnurov is The best coach of episode 5.) (November 8)	1	Natalya Sidortsova	35	Sergiyev Posad	"I Don't Want to Miss a Thing"	✔	✔	✔	✔
Episode 5 (November 8)	2	Ali Asheg	30	Iran	"Рюмка водки"	—	—	—	—
Episode 5 (November 8)	3	Ragda Khanieva	18	Moscow	"Birds Set Free"	—	✔	✔	✔
Episode 5 (November 8)	4	Khurshid Inogamov	38	Chirchiq, Uzbekistan	"Historia de un Amor"	—	—	—	—
Episode 5 (November 8)	5	Svetlana Mamresheva	31	Moscow	"Айсберг"	—	✔	✔	✔
Episode 5 (November 8)	6	Nika Prokopyeva	24	Tallinn, Estonia	"Too Close"	—	✔	—	—
Episode 5 (November 8)	7	Inna Sadayan	18	Vayk, Armenia	"Sareri Hovin Mernem"	✔	✔	✔	✔
Episode 5 (November 8)	8	Dmitry Klinaev	44	Saratov	"Колыбельная"	—	—	✔	—
Episode 5 (November 8)	9	Nurzhigit Sabunkulov	32	Bishkek, Kyrgyzstan	"I Got a Woman"	✔	—	—	—
Episode 5 (November 8)	10	Aigul Valiulina	18	Kazan	"Чистые пруды"	—	—	—	—
Episode 5 (November 8)	11	Daria Dyachenko	24	Viktoropol, Belgorod Oblast	"Still Loving You"	—	—	—	—
Episode 5 (November 8)	12	Roman Voloznev	22	Minsk, Belarus	"На сиреневой луне"	✔	—	—	✔
Episode 6 (Note: Sergey Shnurov is The best coach of episode 6.) (November 15)	1	Anastasia Markova	36	Kyiv, Ukraine	"It's a Man's Man's Man's World"	✔	✔	✔	✔
Episode 6 (November 15)	2	Egor Muskat	32	Moscow	"Поезд на Ленинград"	✔	—	—	—
Episode 6 (November 15)	3	Lilia Veltman	25	Arzamas	"Ты снишься мне"	✔	✔	✔	✔
Episode 6 (November 15)	4	Ksenia Menshchikova	33	Ufa	"Океанами стали"	—	—	—	—
Episode 6 (November 15)	5	Andrew Grunge	43	Toronto, Canada	"Overjoyed"	✔	✔	✔	—
Episode 6 (November 15)	6	Oksana Simon	31	Korenovsk	"The Rhythm Is Magic"	—	Team full	—	—
Episode 6 (November 15)	7	Arseny Kurchanin	17	Yekaterinburg	"Вахтёрам"	✔	Team full	✔	—
Episode 6 (November 15)	8	Elimdar Seydosmanov	36	Nevinnomyssk, Stavropol Krai	"I Got You (I Feel Good)"	✔	Team full	Team full	—
Episode 6 (November 15)	9	Anastasia Smykova	21	Tyumen	"Life"	—	Team full	Team full	—
Episode 6 (November 15)	10	Vrezh Kirakosyan	36	Katnaghbyur, Aragatsotn, Armenia	"Miserere"	—	Team full	Team full	✔
Episode 6 (November 15)	11	Ekaterina Belyakova	43	Okhotsk, Khabarovsk Krai	"I Got Rhythm"	—	Team full	Team full	Team full
Episode 6 (November 15)	12	Daniil Danilevsky	21	Korolyov, Moscow Oblast	"Ненавижу"	✔	✔	✔	✔

== The Battles ==
The Battle Rounds started on November 22, 2019. No steal were available. Contestants who win their battle would advance to the Knockout rounds.

Colour key

Artist won the Battle and advanced to the Knockouts
Artist lost the Battle and was eliminated

Episode	Coach	Order	Winner	Song	Loser
Episode 7 (November 22) (Note: Sergey Shnurov is The best coach of episode 7.)	Polina Gagarina	1	Ekaterina Steblina	"Ленинградский рок-н-ролл"	Maxim Larichev
Episode 7 (November 22)	Valeriy Syutkin	2	Tatyana Gayvorovskaya	"Proud Mary"	Karin Soyref
Episode 7 (November 22)	Konstantin Meladze	3	Valeria Mironova	"Ты скажи"	Roman Voloznev
Episode 7 (November 22)	Sergey Shnurov	4	Ragda Khanieva	"In The Heat of a Disco Night"/ "Smells Like Teen Spirit"	Filipp Lebedev
Episode 7 (November 22)	Polina Gagarina	5	Lilia Veltman	"Ain't Nobody"	Olga Urazgalieva
Episode 7 (November 22)	Sergey Shnurov	6	Iv Nabiev	"Не верь слезам"	Konstantin Strukov
Episode 7 (November 22)	Konstantin Meladze	7	Natalya Sidortsova	"Shallow"	Vrezh Kirakosyan
Episode 7 (November 22)	Valeriy Syutkin	8	Elimdar Seydosmanov	"Rolling in the Deep"	Yury Shurkhovetsky
Episode 7 (November 22)	Konstantin Meladze	9	Svetlana Mamresheva	"Грустный дэнс"	Polina Tyrina
Episode 7 (November 22)	Valeriy Syutkin	10	Nurzhigit Subankulov	"Первый снег"	Vladimir Konovalov
Episode 7 (November 22)	Polina Gagarina	11	Andrew Grunge	"Rockabye"	Emily Cooper
Episode 7 (November 22)	Sergey Shnurov	12	Irina Chuvakova	"Бледный бармен"	Dmitry Klinaev
Episode 8 (November 29) (Note: Sergey Shnurov is The best coach of episode 8.)	Sergey Shnurov	1	Ildar Abdullin	"Сэра"	Stanislav Moshkin
Episode 8 (November 29)	Polina Gagarina	2	Anastasia Markova	"Believer"	Rinat Albikov
Episode 8 (November 29)	Valeriy Syutkin	3	Arsen Mukendi	"Разговор со счастьем"	Viktoria Karachun
Episode 8 (November 29)	Konstantin Meladze	4	Asker Berbekov	"When You Tell Me That You Love Me"	Inna Sadayan
Episode 8 (November 29)	Valeriy Syutkin	5	Egor Muskat	"Дорога в облака"	Daniil Danilevsky
Episode 8 (November 29)	Sergey Shnurov	6	Anton Tokarev	"Survivor"	Milana Rakhmanova
Episode 8 (November 29)	Polina Gagarina	7	Alana Chochieva	"Люби меня, люби"	Felix Kotlo
Episode 8 (November 29)	Konstantin Meladze	8	Elizaveta Shaluba	"Treat Her Like a Lady"	Renata Shtifel
Episode 8 (November 29)	Sergey Shnurov	9	Arseny Kurchanin	"Old Town Road"	Maxim Subachev
Episode 8 (November 29)	Polina Gagarina	10	Iva Todorova	"Аэропорты"	Nika Prokopyeva
Episode 8 (November 29)	Konstantin Meladze	11	Daniil Korolev	"Сберегла"	Anastasia Badyina
Episode 8 (November 29)	Valeriy Syutkin	12	Anastasia Yust	"Never Change Lovers in the Middle of the Night"	Liana Meister

== The Knockouts ==
The Knockout Rounds started on December 6, 2019. Similar to the previous season, each coach pairs three artists into one knockout with only one contestant from the trio advances to the next round and also can steal one losing artist from another coach. The top 12 contestants moved on to the Quarterfinal.

Colour key

Artist won the Knockout and advanced to the Quarterfinal
Artist lost the Knockout but was stolen by another coach and advanced to the Quarterfinal
Artist lost the Knockout and was eliminated

Episode	Coach	Order	Song	Artists		Song	'Steal' result			
Episode	Coach	Order	Song	Winner	Losers	Song	Syutkin	Gagarina	Shnurov	Meladze
Episode 9 (December 6) (Note: Sergey Shnurov is The best coach of episode 9.)	Polina Gagarina	1	"Тает лёд"	Anastasia Markova	Iva Todorova	"Оле, оле"/ "La Vida Es Un Carnaval"	—	—N/a	—	—
Episode 9 (December 6)	Polina Gagarina	1	"Тает лёд"	Anastasia Markova	Ekaterina Steblina	"Call Me"/ "Атас"	—	—N/a	—	—
Episode 9 (December 6)	Valeriy Syutkin	2	"Я - то, что надо"	Arsen Mukendi	Nurzhigit Subankulov	"Wicked Game"	—N/a	—	—	✔
Episode 9 (December 6)	Valeriy Syutkin	2	"Я - то, что надо"	Arsen Mukendi	Egor Muskat	"Как на войне"	—N/a	—	—	Team full
Episode 9 (December 6)	Sergey Shnurov	3	"Life"/ "Bad Guy"	Ragda Khanieva	Arseny Kurchanin	"Лишь о тебе мечтая"	—	—	—N/a	Team full
Episode 9 (December 6)	Sergey Shnurov	3	"Life"/ "Bad Guy"	Ragda Khanieva	Irina Chuvakova	"Никаких больше вечеринок"	—	—	—N/a	Team full
Episode 9 (December 6)	Konstantin Meladze	4	"Што й па мору"	Daniil Korolev	Valeria Mironova	"Don't You Worry 'Bout a Thing"	—	—	—	Team full
Episode 9 (December 6)	Konstantin Meladze	4	"Што й па мору"	Daniil Korolev	Elizaveta Shaluba	"Звёздная ночь"	—	—	—	Team full
Episode 10 (December 13) (Note: Sergey Shnurov is The best coach of episode 10.)	Sergey Shnurov	1	"Седьмой лепесток"	Anton Tokarev	Iv Nabiev	"Ausländer"	—	✔	—N/a	Team full
Episode 10 (December 13)	Sergey Shnurov	1	"Седьмой лепесток"	Anton Tokarev	Ildar Abdullin	"Bamboleo"	—	Team full	—N/a	Team full
Episode 10 (December 13)	Konstantin Meladze	2	"Luna"	Asker Berbekov	Svetlana Mamresheva	"Чудесная страна"/ "Vacanze romane"	—	Team full	✔	Team full
Episode 10 (December 13)	Konstantin Meladze	2	"Luna"	Asker Berbekov	Natalya Sidortsova	"Мыслепад"	—	Team full	Team full	Team full
Episode 10 (December 13)	Polina Gagarina	3	"Опять метель"	Alana Chochieva	Andrew Grunge	"Without You"	—	Team full	Team full	Team full
Episode 10 (December 13)	Polina Gagarina	3	"Опять метель"	Alana Chochieva	Lilia Veltman	"Солдат любви"/ "Bang Bang"	✔	Team full	Team full	Team full
Episode 10 (December 13)	Valeriy Syutkin	4	"Ты меня любишь"	Elimdar Seydosmanov	Tatyana Gayvorovskaya	"Лучший город Земли"	Team full	Team full	Team full	Team full
Episode 10 (December 13)	Valeriy Syutkin	4	"Ты меня любишь"	Elimdar Seydosmanov	Anastasia Yust	"Посмотри в глаза"	Team full	Team full	Team full	Team full

== Live shows ==
Colour key:

Artist was saved
Artist was eliminated

=== Week 1: Top 12 — Quarterfinal (December 20) ===
The Live Top 12 Quarterfinal comprised episode 11. The top twelve artists performed, with two artists from each team advancing based on the sum of the viewers' and coach's votes.

Episode	Coach	Order	Artist	Song	Coach's vote (/100%)	Public's vote (/100%)	Votes' sum	Result
Episode 11 (December 20) (Note: Sergey Shnurov is The best coach of episode 11.)	Polina Gagarina	1	Anastasia Markova	"Комета"	20%	9,9%	29,9%	Eliminated
Episode 11 (December 20)	Polina Gagarina	2	Alana Chochieva	"Лететь"	50%	44,5%	94,5%	Advanced
Episode 11 (December 20)	Polina Gagarina	3	Iv Nabiev	"Красиво"	30%	45,6%	75,6%	Advanced
Episode 11 (December 20)	Valeriy Syutkin	4	Elimdar Seydosmanov	"Вокруг шум"/"Менеджер""	50%	38,6%	88,6%	Advanced
Episode 11 (December 20)	Valeriy Syutkin	5	Lilia Veltman	"Загадай"	20%	14,3%	34,3%	Eliminated
Episode 11 (December 20)	Valeriy Syutkin	6	Arsen Mukendi	"Увезу тебя я в тундру" / "Take On Me"	30%	47,1%	77,1%	Advanced
Episode 11 (December 20)	Konstantin Meladze	7	Daniil Korolev	"На заре"	20%	19,4%	39,4%	Eliminated
Episode 11 (December 20)	Konstantin Meladze	8	Nurzhigit Subankulov	"Батарейка" / "You Can Leave Your Hat On»	30%	28,1%	58,1%	Advanced
Episode 11 (December 20)	Konstantin Meladze	9	Asker Berbekov	"Because We Believe"	50%	52,5%	102,5%	Advanced
Episode 11 (December 20)	Sergey Shnurov	10	Svetlana Mamresheva	"Позови меня"	20%	13,6%	33,6%	Eliminated
Episode 11 (December 20)	Sergey Shnurov	11	Anton Tokarev	"Слёзы"	50%	40,3%	90,3%	Advanced
Episode 11 (December 20)	Sergey Shnurov	12	Ragda Khanieva	"Выхода нет"	30%	46,1%	76,1%	Advanced

=== Week 2: Top 8 — Semifinal (December 27) ===
The top eight artists performed on December 27, 2019, with one artist from each team advancing to the Final based on the sum of the viewers' and coach's votes

Episode	Coach	Order	Artist	Song	Coach's vote (/100%)	Public's vote (/100%)	Votes' sum	Result
Episode 12 (December 27) (Note: Sergey Shnurov is The best coach of episode 12.)	Konstantin Meladze	1	Nurzhigit Subankulov	"Human"	40%	43,3%	83,3%	Eliminated
Episode 12 (December 27)	Konstantin Meladze	2	Asker Berbekov	"My Baby You"	60%	56,7%	116,7%	Advanced
Episode 12 (December 27)	Sergey Shnurov	3	Ragda Khanieva	«Нас не догонят»	40%	54,8%	94,8%	Eliminated
Episode 12 (December 27)	Sergey Shnurov	4	Anton Tokarev	"Мне бы в небо" / "Весна"	60%	45,2%	105,2%	Advanced
Episode 12 (December 27)	Polina Gagarina	5	Alana Chochieva	"Арлекино"	40%	54,2%	94,2%	Eliminated
Episode 12 (December 27)	Polina Gagarina	6	Iv Nabiev	"Поговори со мною, мама"	60%	45,8%	105,8%	Advanced
Episode 12 (December 27)	Valeriy Syutkin	7	Elimdar Seydosmanov	"Там, где клён шумит"	40%	55,4%	95,4%	Eliminated
Episode 12 (December 27)	Valeriy Syutkin	8	Arsen Mukendi	"Ego"	60%	44,6%	104,6%	Advanced

Non-competition performances
Order	Performers	Song
1	Pelageya, Nurzhigit Subankulov, Asker Berbekov	"Конь"
2	Little Big, Anton Tokarev, Ragda Khanieva	"Skibidi" / "Снег"
3	Zivert, Alana Chochieva, Iv Nabiev	«Life»
4	Hibla Gerzmava, Elimdar Seydosmanov, Arsen Mukendi	"Smile"

=== Week 3: Final (January 1) ===
Coach	Artist	Order	Duet Song (with Coach)	Order	Solo Song (no.1)	Order	Solo Song (no.2)	Result	
Valeriy Syutkin	Arsen Mukendi	1	"7000 над землёй"	5	"Парень чернокожий" / "I Wish"	Eliminated		Fourth place	
Polina Gagarina	Iv Nabiev	2	"Смотри"	6	"SuperSTAR"	9	"Моя бабушка курит трубку"	Third place	
Sergey Shnurov	Anton Tokarev	3	"Супер гуд"	7	"Жить в кайф"	10	"Castle on the Hill"	Second place	33.9%
Konstantin Meladze	Asker Berbekov	4	"Как ты красива сегодня"	8	"Can't Help Falling in Love"	11	"Карточный домик"	Winner	66.1%

Non-competition performances
Order	Performers	Song
13.1	Arsen Mukendi, Iv Nabiev, Anton Tokarev, Asker Berbekov	"Last Christmas"
13.2	Arsen Mukendi	"The Last Waltz"
13.3	Asker Berbekov (winner)	"Can't Help Falling in Love"
13.4	Top 48 artists	"The Winner Takes It All"

== Best Coach ==
Colour key

- Best Coach
- Second place
- Third place
- Fourth place
- Episode's Best Coach

Coach	Public's vote _{(per episode)}													Result
Coach	#1	#2	#3	#4	#5	#6	#7	#8	#9	#10	#11	#12	Av.	Result
Sergey Shnurov	40%	38%	40%	38%	35%	36%	44%	45%	40%	40%	39%	42%	40%	Best coach
Konstantin Meladze	25%	23%	32%	30%	32%	31%	24%	25%	27%	27%	29%	29%	28%	Second place
Polina Gagarina	20%	27%	18%	20%	21%	19%	18%	18%	18%	20%	18%	16%	19%	Third place
Valeriy Syutkin	15%	12%	10%	12%	12%	14%	14%	12%	15%	13%	14%	13%	13%	Fourth place

== Reception ==
=== Rating ===
Episode		Original airdate	Production	Time slot (UTC+3)	Audience		Source
Episode		Original airdate	Production	Time slot (UTC+3)	Rating	Share	Source
1	"The Blind Auditions Premiere"	October 11, 2019	801	Friday 9:30 p.m.	5.9	21.4	
2	"The Blind Auditions, Part 2"	October 18, 2019	802	Friday 9:30 p.m.	5.2	18.8	
3	"The Blind Auditions, Part 3"	October 25, 2019	803	Friday 9:30 p.m.	5.4	18.9	
4	"The Blind Auditions, Part 4"	November 1, 2019	804	Friday 9:30 p.m.	5.0	17.2	
5	"The Blind Auditions, Part 5"	November 8, 2019	805	Friday 9:30 p.m.	5.6	18.8	
6	"The Blinds End"	November 15, 2019	806	Friday 9:30 p.m.	5.3	18.1	
7	"The Battles Premiere"	November 22, 2019	807	Friday 9:30 p.m.	5.1	18.2	
8	"The Battles, Part 2"	November 29, 2019	808	Friday 9:30 p.m.			
