= Valery Levaneuski =

Belarusian pro-democracy activist

Valery Levaneuski Валерий Левоневский
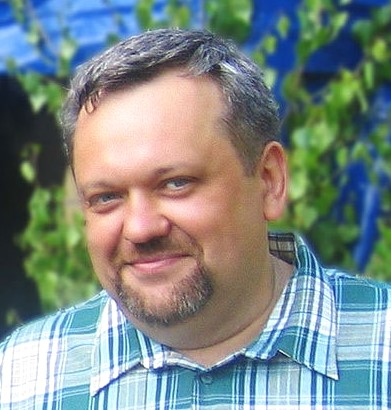
- Valery Levaneuski
- Born: 15 August 1963 (age 62); Grodno, Byelorussian SSR, USSR
- Occupations: entrepreneur, opposition leader, president of the National Strike Committee
- Website: http://levonevsky.org

Valery Stanislavovich Levaneuski (Russian: Вале́рий Станисла́вович Левоне́вский, Belarusian: Вале́ры Станісла́вавіч Леване́ўскі, Polish: Walery Lewoniewski) is a Belarusian political and social activist, and former political prisoner. Amnesty International recognizes him as a prisoner of conscience.

== Biography ==
Valery Levaneuski was born on 15 August 1963 into a large family in Grodno.

In 1979, Levaneuski became a candidate for master of sports boxing.

In 1980 Levaneuski began a career as a fitter in mechanical workshops.

From 1980 to 1982, Levaneuski served in the Soviet Armed Forces. He was an expert of Soviet and Bulgarian armies.

Between 1985 and 1991, Levaneuski was an adjuster of radio electronics, a mechanic of control and measuring devices and apparatus, and an engineer in various Grodno enterprises.

In 1991 Levaneuski registered as an entrepreneur. He directed the regional union for protection of taxpayers’, consumers’ and drivers’ rights in Grodno, as well as the Grodno information and legal center and Grodno consumer protection center.

Since 1996, Valery Levaneuski has been under close scrutiny by the authorities and subjected to searches, confiscation of property and questioning over various charges.

Since 1996, he leads the strike committee (so-called Stachkom) of entrepreneurs of the Republic of Belarus. He organized numerous mass protests of entrepreneurs in the Republic of Belarus that resulted in him being fined, arrested and prosecuted. He is a founder and chief editor of “The Employer” Republican bulletin. On numerous occasions he participated in elections as a parliamentary candidate for municipal and regional legislative bodies. Every time his registration of a candidate was denied for political reasons.

In 2001, he ran for President of the Belarus Republic. He broke the slate because of the change of legislation during the elections (Decree #20 from year 2001).

In 2002, the strike committee led by Levaneuski organized a strike of 120,000 small traders calling for President Lukashenko to be ousted and blaming him personally for the suppression of small businesses in Belarus.

In February 2003, Levaneuski was denied registration as candidate for Deputy.

From 15 May 2004 to 15 May 2006 - served sentence of imprisonment in a colony, with confiscation of property, under art. 368, part 2 of the Criminal Code (insult to the President of the Republic of Belarus). Fully served a two-year prison sentence and was released on 15 May 2006.

2004-2006 – served sentence in form of confinement at general regime penal colony with confiscation of property in accordance with part 2, article 368 of Criminal Code of the Republic of Belarus (contempt of the President of the Belarus Republic). Valery Levaunevski could not be released on conditional discharge or on amnesty. While serving his sentence in penal colonies he was penalized in form of placing into disciplinary cell, denial of relatives' visits, and also tortures, threat of homicide from administration of correctional facility. All of it was for the central purpose: for him to sign the public waiver of his political activity. Valery was denied of the qualified medical assistance and medical supervision during the entire term of his imprisonment. He was not allowed to appeal sanctions of prison administration in court.

Valery Levaneuski has served his entire 2-year sentence, “done” his time “from start to finish” in various prisons and colonies, including:

- Prison #1 of the city of Grodno
- Pre-trial detention center #1, Minsk
- Pre-trial detention center #6, Baranovichi
- Penal colony #22, “Wolf burrows”, Brest Region
- Penal colony #19, Mogilev

2010 – release of a documentary “In Government’s Hindsight” dedicated to the development of strike movement of entrepreneurs in Belarus. Valery Levaneuski, main character of the film, tells about importance and dangers of having a business in Belarus. Film was a winner of the 15th All-Polish documental watch BAZAR in Poznań.

== Arrests and searches ==
On 8 July 2001, Levaneuski and three members of his initiative group were detained by the police while collecting voters' signatures on a parking lot near the road police station on outskirts of Lida.

29 August 2002 - Two juvenile sons of Valery Levaneuski were arrested in Mogilev while distributing a bulletin titled "Predprinimatel" ("The Entrepreneur") among vendors at a local outdoor market.

On 11 October 2002, Valery Levaneuski was arrested in Grodno and charged with violation of Art. 167, par. 1 ("participation in mass actions violating public order") of the Belarusian Administrative Offenses Code for holding an authorized rally in protest against recent tax increases and insurance fees for small business owners.

Overnight on 15–16 February 2003, the law-enforcers raided the Grodno house of Valery Levaneuski. The raid commenced at 10.20p.m. and ended at 00.15a.m. Valery has just returned from Minsk. The night visit was carried out with certain acts of violence, applied against Valery's elder son Dmitry. As a result of the raid was confiscated copying machine and printed production.

In April 2003, he was arrested while delivering a petition from market traders to the parliament and subsequently sentenced to 15 days' imprisonment for taking part in the "March for a Better Life" on 12 March.

On 19 September 2004, Levaneuski's son detained at market in Lida for distributing news bulletin.

== Criminal case ==
On the threshold of 1 May 2004, there were leaflets distributed in Grodno that invited citizens to participate in an approved rally on 1 May. Leaflets also contained the following text:

come and say that you are against 'somebody' going on holiday skiing in Austria and having a good time at your cost

Because it was well known that President of Belarus, Alexander Lukashenko was spending his vacation in Austria, prosecutor's office of Belarus has later considered it as a public insult of the President.

1 May 2004 Levaneuski was going to participate in a demonstration in Grodno that was approved by government, but in the morning he was detained upon leaving his home. Police officials delivered him to local police department, removed his money and passport and placed him into the temporary detention facility. Same morning Levaneuski's children were also detained, but they were released from police department several hours later.

On 3 May 2004 Valery Levaneuski was convicted to 15-day arrest. In violation of law, he was judged not in a court house, but in the cell of the temporary detention facility.

On 3 May 2004 Uladzimir Levaneuski, son of Valery Levaneuski was convicted for 13-day arrest for active participation in the 1 May protest action.

On 7 May 2004 officials of State Security Committee of the Republic of Belarus and OMON (SWAT) team had broken the entrance door and entered Valery Levaneuski's apartment. Search had lasted for six hours. All of the computers were seized along with many documents and valuables. Officials of the KGB forced Levaneuski's underaged daughter to testify against her father. On that day and during the next few days officials from the KGB had conducted searches at Levaneuski's relatives’ houses and in the offices of non-profit organizations that might have been part of “Insult of President” case.

On 14 May 2004, one day before expiration of 15-days of arrest, Levaneuski's detention term was increased for three days.

On 18 May 2004 Levaneuski was indicted in accordance with part 2, article 368 of Criminal code of Belarus: “Public insult of the President of the Republic of Belarus, conducted by a person, previously convicted for contempt or defamation, or as an incident to accusation in committal of grave or especially grave offence”. Valery was moved from temporary detention facility into the pro-trial detention center for 2 months.

4 June 2004, for the first time since his arrest on May 1, 2004, Valery Levaneuski was allowed to meet with his wife in pro-trial detention center.

On 12 July 2004 Levaneuski's arrest was extended for another month.

On 21 July 2004 Levaneuski's wife addressed President of Belarus, Alexander Lukashenko with complaints regarding conditions of her husband's detention in pro-trial detention center.

On 21 July 2004 criminal case under article 342 of the Criminal code of Belarus “Organization of non-authorized rally”, which provides for arrest for up to 3 years, was filed against his son Uladzimir Levaneuski.

21 July 2004 Valery Levaneuski declared a hunger strike in pre-trial detention center

27 July 2004 Levaneuski suspend the hunger strike.

On 28 July 2004 Valery Levaneuski and his son were freed from the charges under article 342 of Criminal code of Belarus Republic (“Organization of non-authorized rally”).

On 1 August 2004 famous Russian rock musicians Sergey Shnurov (band “Leningrad (band)”) and Alexander Vasiliev (band “Splean”) have held a brief for Levaneuski.

On 16 August 2004 court has extended Levaneuski’ term of arrest for another month.

On 7 September 2004, court of Leninsky District of the city of Grodno had found Valery Levaneuski guilty in public insult of the President of Belarus Republic coupled to accusation in committal of grave offence, and based on part 2, article 368 of the Criminal code of Belarus Republic sentenced him to two years of confinement with serving the sentence in a general regime penal colony [28]. The judge decreed that a leaflet, which Levaneuski had distributed prior to demonstrations on 1 May 2004, contains a public insult to the President (since Alexander Lukashenko is known to have spent his holidays in Austria).

On 16 September 2004, European Parliament calls on the Belarus authorities to release immediately Valery Levaneuski and all other imprisoned political opponents of the regime.

On 2 June 2005, State Department calls on Belarus authorities to release Valery Levaneuski and all other political prisoners

== Family ==
Levanéuski is married, with four children.
