= National Strike Committee of Belarus =

Non-governmental organization in Belarus

National Strike Committee of Belarus (Russian: Общенациональный стачечный комитет Беларуси), known informally as Stachkom (Russian: Стачком) or Stachkam (Belarusian: Стачкам) is the unregistered Belarusian organization whose basic mission is to protect the rights of citizens (including the arrangement of protest actions against violation of the rights and legitimate interests of citizens).

== History ==
Strike Committee of entrepreneurs of the Republic of Belarus works since 1996. On November 25, 2003, National Strike Committee of Belarus was founded based on it.

Since foundation, the chairman is an entrepreneur and former political prisoner Valery Levaneuski. During his imprisonment, from May 1, 2004 to May 15, 2006, the Acting Chairman of the Strike Committee was his son Uladzimir Levaneuski.

== Protest actions ==
Year	Date	Type	Attendance	Length	Location	Notes	Ref(s)
2000	1 Jan	Strike	100,000	5 days			
2000	31 Jan	Meeting			Minsk	Political meeting of entrepreneurs was held in Minsk. Meeting resolution included both economic and political demands (resignation of the Minister of Entrepreneurship).	
2000	1 Feb	Strike		11 days	Nationwide	The majority of entrepreneurs of merchandise markets of Belarus started an indefinite strike, which was suspended on February 12.	
2000	23 Nov	Strike	150,000+		Nationwide	Warning strike of private entrepreneurs	
2001	1 Jan	Strike	About 200,000	5 days	Nationwide		
2001	8 May	Strike	90,000+ entrepreneurs and employed persons		Nationwide		
2001	18 May	Strike			Nationwide	General republican political strike of individual entrepreneurs, timed to the Second All-Belarusian Public Gathering held in Minsk on that day.	
2002	20 June	Strike	Entrepreneurs in Grodno		Grodno	All markets in Grodno were closed.	
2002	31 July	Strike	100,000-150,000 entrepreneurs and employed persons	1 day	Nationwide	Warning strike of individual entrepreneurs.	
2002	26 Aug	Meeting	2,000+		Minsk	Political meeting was held in Minsk in support of economic and other rights of entrepreneurs.	
2002	11 Sep	Strike	160,000 entrepreneurs and employed persons	1 day	Nationwide	Political strike of Belarusian entrepreneurs.	
2002	12 Sep	Campaign		Ongoing	Nationwide	Campaign of civil disobedience was announced. The campaign continues to the present day as well.	
2002	1 Oct	Strike	120,000-190,000 entrepreneurs and employed persons	10 days	Nationwide	Strike with termination of payment of taxes and other payments to the budget.	
2002	19 Dec	Strike	4,000+ entrepreneurs		Grodno	Demands included the resignation of President Alexander Lukashenko.	
2003	22 Jan	Strike	8,000+	1 day	Grodno	Major markets and mini-markets of the city were closed.	
2003	27 Feb	Meeting				Strike Committee of Entrepreneurs, together with business structures, organized a political meeting in defense of the rights of entrepreneurs.	
2003	12 March	March				Strike Committee of Entrepreneurs, together with several organizations, held People's March “For Better Life”.	
2003	1 April	March			Minsk	“March to Parliament” campaign. Valery Levaneuski was detained and arrested for 15 days in the beginning of this campaign.	
2003	25 Sep	Strike	50% of Belarusian entrepreneurs		Nationwide		
2004	1 May	Demonstration	4,000		Grodno	The chairman of the Strike Committee, Valery Levonevsky, was arrested for 15 days on that day, and then sentenced to two years of prison.	
2004	3 May	Meeting	1,500 entrepreneurs		Lenin Square in Grodno	The same day, plainclothes police detained and then arrested Vladimir Levonevsky for 13 days for organizing protest actions.	
2007	25 March	Strike		1 day	Minsk	Preventive strike of Belarusian entrepreneurs.	

== Other activities ==
The Strike Committee also organises to promote support for prisoners. For example, in September 2005, they gave books, sports equipment and other useful things to Ivatsevichy prison No.22. Local branches of the Strike Committee had been created in prison; by March 2005, in five Belarusian prisons such representatives were established.
