= Fantine (musician) =

Australian singer (born 1984)

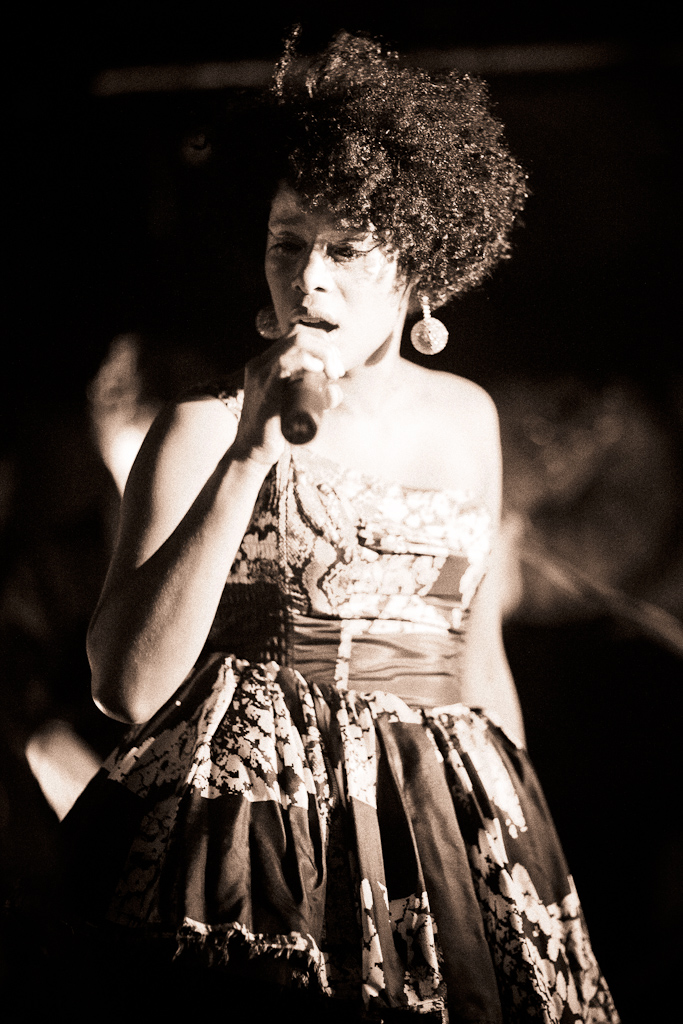
- Performing live (Sydney)

Background information
- Born: Fantine Maria Pritoula; 6 February 1984 (age 42)
- Origin: Moscow, Russia
- Genres: Indie/Electro/Soul
- Occupations: Musician, singer/songwriter
- Instruments: Vocals, piano
- Years active: 2009–present
- Label: Independent
- Website: Official Site

Fantine Maria Pritoula (born 6 February 1984) is an Australian singer and songwriter. Fantine is currently residing in Miami, Florida. She made her musical debut on the Australian indie music scene in 2010 as a featured artist in a collaboration with Space Invadas (Katalyst and Steve Spacek) resulting in the soulful, jazz-inspired single, Super Sweet.

In 2011, Fantine announced Rubberoom (2011) as her first solo release. The song was also aired on Australian national television programs including Rage and Video Hits, and was awarded "Indie Video Clip of The Week." Since then, Fantine has gone on to release singles Eleven (2011) and Perfect Strangers (2011), produced in the UK by Gorillaz producer, Jason Cox, and Don't Come Around (2012), recorded in Australia and produced by UK producer, Lee Groves.

In 2013, Fantine began working on her debut album, I Am Fantine (2015), with 19-time Grammy Award-winning producer, Emilio Estefan, and seven-time Grammy Award-winning singer/songwriter Gloria Estefan, who also co-wrote two of her songs. The Estefans curated and helped develop Fantine's Bachata de Rosa (2014) and Reservation for Two (2014), which landed the No. 5 spot on Billboard's Dance Song Chart.

In March 2015, Fantine joined three-time Grammy Award-Fwinning singer/songwriter and producer, Wyclef Jean, at the Miami Beach Centennial Celebration Concert to perform a rendition of Killing Me Softly. She is currently working on her latest single What A Day (2015) co-produced by Emilio Estefan and Wyclef Jean, featuring Wyclef Jean and reggaeton singer, El Cata.

== Early life and family ==
Born to Russian father (Anatoli Pritoula) and Dominican mother (Rita Pritoula), Fantine and sister Alexandra, were raised in a tri-lingual household (Russian, Spanish, English). The family immigrated to Australia in 1992.

Fantine returned to Australia in 2001 to study at the Notre Dame University, Western Australia in Perth, Western Australia. She was enrolled in a Bachelor of Law and Accounting. While studying, Fantine performed live with a local band Soul Corporation. During this period, music was largely a hobby.

== Music career ==
=== Collaborative work ===
Fantine's music career began in 2009 when she signed a management deal with The Coady Group and relocated to Sydney. In her first year in Sydney Fantine was introduced to Sydney-based band Space Invadas, the new project between Australian indie hip-hop producer Katalyst (musician) and Steve Spacek. Together they recorded a collaboration track titled Super Sweet. It featured Fantine on vocals and was lifted off Space Invada's album Soul:Fi (2010). Super Sweet aired was first aired on Triple J in March 2010. In support of the release of Soul:Fi, the band toured Australia performing at festivals such as Splendour in the Grass, Future Music Festival (Future Entertainment) and the rural Groovin' the Moo Festival.

In 2014, Fantine embarked on two Russian Jazz tours throughout the U.S. with the acclaimed Russian jazz saxophonist Igor Butman and his Moscow Jazz Orchestra. Some of their noted performances include the M&T Syracuse Jazz Fest.

=== Solo work ===
From June through August 2010, Fantine spent time in the US and UK co-writing music for her forthcoming EP and Album with a series of writers including Australian ARIA Award winning writer Ben Lee, songwriter and producer Sacha Skarbek, and Leeds based writers/producers John Beck and Steve Chrisanthou.

Fantine's first solo release was a single titled Rubberoom (Rubberoom) (February 2011), a song about "the place where lost ideas go". It was co-written with UK writer/producer Alex Gray and was first aired on Triple J in February 2011. The release of the song was followed by the airing of the music video on Australian national television programs including Rage, where the music video was awarded the status of "Indie Video Clip of The Week" and Video Hits (Australian TV series) as part of the 2011 Predictions Segment. Rubberoom was followed by Fantine's second release, titled Eleven (Eleven) (May 2011). This song delves into the "superstition and mysticism of the number Eleven".

In 2013, Fantine relocated to Miami to bring her music to the states and work with Emilio and Gloria Estefan, who helped Fantine produce singles Bachata de Rosa (2014), a song about "love and longing" that lends tribute to her Latin roots, and Reservation for Two (2014). The music video to Reservation for Two, which is co-produced and directed by Emilio Estefan, shows the complexities and hardships of a relationship. Fantine went on to work with DJs like Ted Smooth to develop remixes of Reservation for Two and reach a new audience. Reservation for Two went on to land the No. 5 spot on Billboard's Dance Song Chart in 2014. Fantine hit the U.S. market making several guest appearances throughout the country. In March 2014, she was a featured artist performer at Perez Hilton's 36th Birthday 'Madonnathon' in New York City. Other performers included JoJo and Kat Graham. In April 2014, Fantine made a guest appearance at the Power of Love Gala.

In June 2014, Fantine began her promo tour for her two new singles Reservation for Two and Bachata de Rosa. Her single Reservation for Two officially debuted in July 2014 on PerezHilton.com. Several popular DJ's including Ted Smooth, began remixing the song and it became a hit club single and played throughout various U.S. dance clubs. Fantine kicked off her Spanish tour for her second single, Bachata de Rosa, in August 2014. In September 2014, she made a guest appearance and publicly debuted the song on Univision's hit show, El Gordo y la Flaca, and it simultaneously launched online on PeopleEspanol.com.

In October 2014, Fantine performed her new single Reservation for Two at the People en Español's "Las 25 Mujeres Mas Poderosas" luncheon in Coral Gables, Florida. She was also seen in Miami later that month where she sang the Star Spangled Banner at the Dolphins vs. Green Bay Packers football game. After her NFL performance, Fantine was asked to perform at a campaigns rally for former Florida Governor and Democratic gubernatorial candidate Charlie Crist on 17 October 2014 in Miami, Florida.

In November 2014, Fantine performed at the 24-Hour Cotton Inc. Live Fashion Show. She sang her two singles Bachata de Rosa and Reservation for Two and was accompanied by other featured performances and appearances by Jason Derulo, Trey Smith, Fantine, D.J. Irie and fashion icon, Olivia Palermo. She also performed at the University of Miami's, Festival Miami.

Shortly after, in March 2015, Fantine announced she was working on a new project with singer/songwriter/producer Wyclef Jean, showing the two in Wyclef's recording studio in his New Jersey home. In March, Fantine appeared on NBC's 6 in the Mix alongside Wyclef Jean, Emilio Estefan, Rudy Perez, and Miami Mayor Carlos Jimenez to promote her upcoming performance at the Miami Beach Centennial Concert on 25 March 2015. At the concert, and before being joined on stage by Wyclef Jean, Fantine performed a cover of Compay Segundo's Chan Chan, paying tribute to Miami Beach's Cuban community, as well as her hit single, Reservation for Two. She then performed a rendition of The Fugees’ Killing Me Softly alongside Wyclef Jean.

Soon after her performance, Fantine announced on her social media pages that her new song, What A Day, included co-production by Emilio Estefan and also featured Dominican reggaeton singer El Cata. In June 2015, Fantine released her new single What A Day, featuring Wyclef Jean and El Cata, on AllMusic.com. The song focused on the trials faced by exotic dancers in everyday life. The official What A Day music video premiered on Vevo.com in July 2015 and a remix of the song is currently peaked at number 4 on the Billboard Dance Club Charts.

== Performances and appearances ==
=== Guest appearances ===
Fantine was also featured as a guest vocalist with Space Invadas during the launch of their album Soul:Fi at the Oxford Art Factory (Sydney).

=== Support slots ===
In March 2011, Fantine performed a support slot for Melbourne-based soul band Electric Empire. The performance received positive reviews.

Fantine also performed backing vocals for Eurythmics David A. Stewart, who accompanied Stevie Nicks as a special guest during her November/December (2011) tour of Australia.

In February 2012 Fantine performed support slots for Erykah Badu, US based soul man, Mayer Hawthorne. This was followed by a support slot with Daniel Merriweather in April 2012.

== Discography ==
=== Singles ===
Year	Title	Billboard Peak Chart Position	Certifications	EP/Album
2010	"Rubberoom"	—	—	TBA
2011	"Eleven"	—	—	TBA
2011	"Perfect Strangers"	—	—	TBA
2012	"Don't Come Around"	—	—	TBA
2012	"Desconocidos"	—	—	TBA
2012	"Contra Banda"	—	—	TBA
2014	"Bachata de Rosa"	31, Billboard Tropical Songs Chart	—	TBA
2014	"Reservation for Two"	No. 5, Billboard Hot Dance Club Charts	—	TBA
2015	"What a Day"	No. 4, Billboard Hot Dance Club Charts	—	TBA
2016	"Get Up"	TBA	TBA	

=== Music Videos ===
Year	Title	Details
2011	"Rubberoom"	Directed by Alex Roberts (Art vs. Science)
2011	"Eleven"	Directed by Francis Coady
2012	"Perfect Strangers"	Directed by Timothy Baker
2012	"Don't Come Around"	Directed by Luke Shanahan
2014	"Desconocidos"	Directed by Timothy Baker
2014	"Bachata de Rosa"	Directed by Emilio Estefan
2014	"Reservation for Two"	Directed by Emilio Estefan
2015	"What a Day"	Directed by Connor Van Vuuren
