= Viktoropol =

Viktoropol Викторополь
- Settlement
- Location within Belgorod Oblast Location within Russia
- Coordinates: 50°04′N 38°28′E
- Country: Russia
- Region: Belgorod Oblast
- District: Veydelevsky District
- Time zone: UTC+3:00

Viktoropol (Russian: Викторополь) is a rural locality (a settlement) and the administrative center of Viktoropolskoye Rural Settlement, Veydelevsky District, Belgorod Oblast, Russia. The population was 1,144 as of 2010. There are 14 streets in the settlement.

== Geography ==
Viktoropol is located 10 km south of Veydelevka (the district's administrative centre) by road. Opytny is the nearest other rural locality.
