= Sergey Shnurov =

Russian musician and songwriter (born 1973)

Sergey Shnurov Сергей Шнуров
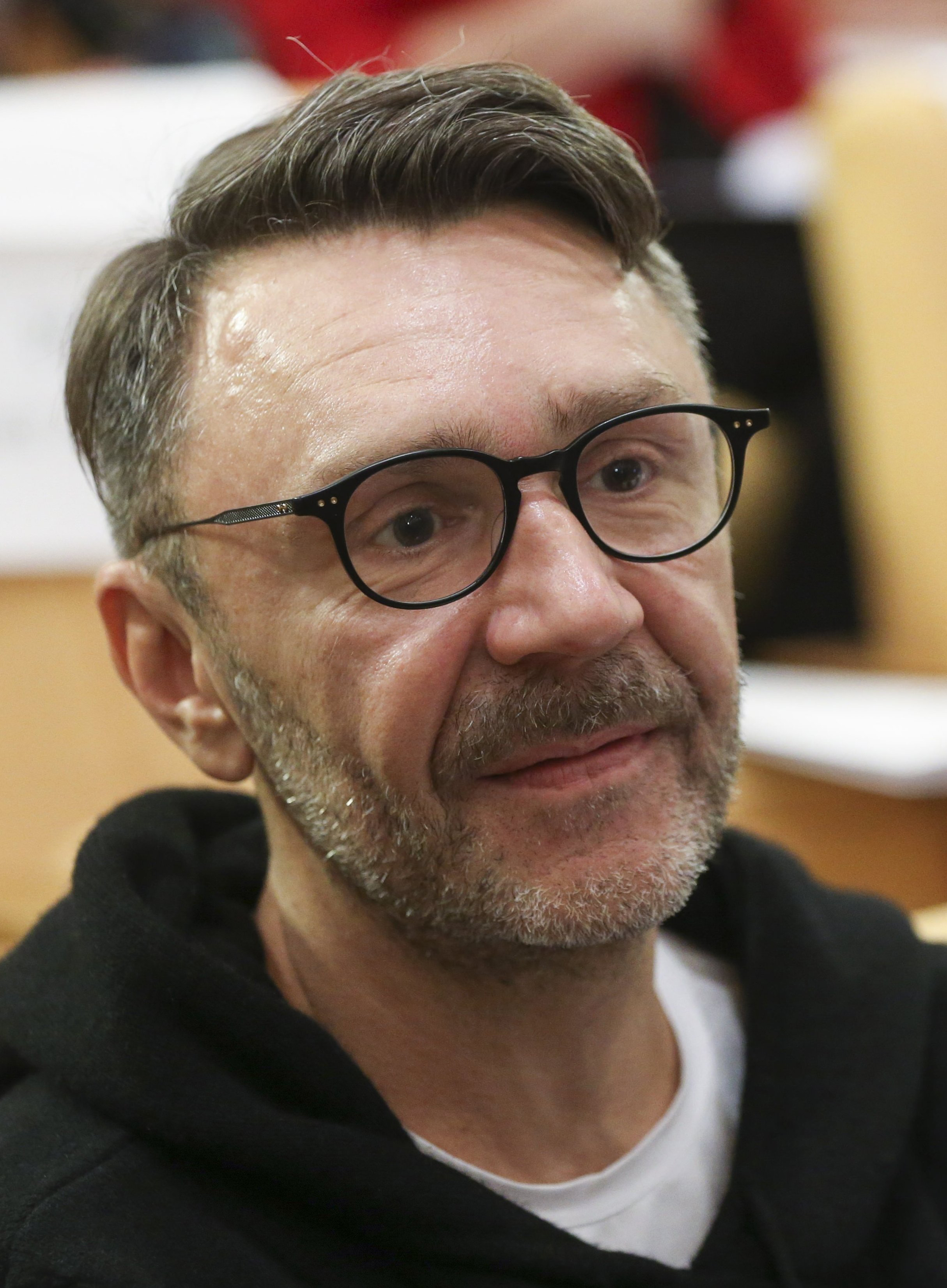
- Shnurov in 2019

Background information
- Born: Sergey Vladimirovich Shnurov; April 13, 1973 (age 53)
- Origin: Leningrad, Soviet Union
- Genres: Ska, Ska punk, Rock
- Occupations: singer, composer, poet, actor, artist, showman
- Years active: 1997–present

Sergey Vladimirovich Shnurov (Russian: Серге́й Влади́мирович Шну́ров; born 13 April 1973) is a Russian musician and songwriter, best known as Shnur (lit. cord), of the ska-punk band Leningrad which he formed in 1997. The group disbanded between 2008 and 2010, during which time Shnur formed Rubl with other members of Leningrad.

Three of Shnur's songs featured on the Everything Is Illuminated soundtrack: Звезда рок-н-ролла (Rock-n-Roll Star), Дикий мужчина (Wild Man), and Маленький мальчик (A Little Boy). Shnurov also composed music for many other movies, including the Russian cult film Bumer and its sequel.

Art critic Stanislav Zapalikov thinks that the main audience of Shnurov are clerks who need someone to channel their aggression. Most of the Shnur's songs excessively use obscene words and have a very simple composition, thus fulfilling this function. In 2016, Shnurov reported the highest income of all singers in Russia ($11 million). In 2017, he was on the cover of the Russian edition of Forbes.

After the 2022 Russian invasion of Ukraine, he appeared in a music video on YouTube suggesting that to be a Russian was equivalent to having been a Jew in 1944 in Germany during WWII. It is unclear if the text is to be understood as ironic criticism or support of Russians abroad lamenting purported anti-Russian sentiment. He also left his post as producer at the international Russian language channel RTVI, citing as a reason possible differences in opinion around the situation.

== Political views ==
Shnurov speaks critically about the activities of United Russia, Nashi, and other pro-Kremlin organizations. He also stated his lack of desire to meet with Vladimir Putin, calling the belief that something can be agreed upon with the authorities "infantilism."

In September 2010, Shnurov released a video ridiculing musicians who defended the Khimki Forest. The hero of the song claims that their activity is caused by the desire to increase ticket sales.

On 26 January 2011, he stated that he denies the existence of civil society in Russia, that the 2012 presidential elections would not be fair, and that Mikhail Khodorkovsky should be released from prison.

In February 2013, in response to a question from The New Times magazine, Shnurov spoke in support of homosexual teenagers: "There is neither a Greek nor a Jew. These words were not spoken by me, and these words are already 2000 years old. Has anything changed since then? There are people. Nothing else matters."

Shnurov refrains from making statements about the political situation in Ukraine and explained his political position as follows:

This position is very simple: this too shall pass. This is not forever: and these people are not forever, and the conflict is not forever, all this [is thought about]... If you pay attention to every such thing... I am 42 years old. I lived in a different country, with different money, with different values, and if I sincerely believed in all the bullshit that they told me about every time, I would have gone crazy. Why should I take what is said seriously now? I know I need to stay away from all this bullshit.

Shnurov opposes the death penalty. He advocated the release of Belarusian political prisoners Valery Levaneuski and Alexander Vasiliyev.

Regarding profane language, which is often present in his work, he says the following:

The fact is that there is no profane language. There is the Russian language in all its volume. There is no need to highlight this profane language. Is this a separate dying or existing language? There is no profane language. There is a Russian language that includes the word "khuy". This is a Russian word, this is the Russian language. If we exclude it, it wouldn't quite be the Russian language. Or rather, language, but not in its full extent. That's all.

[...]And in general, spoken Russian is very different from the public language. And the whole phenomenon of the success of the Leningrad group is that the presence of profanity sharply reduces the distance between the artist and the viewer. We are literally transported to a bathhouse, where man is brother to man. And you may no longer be quite an artist, because an artist is a creature practically close to the Presidential Administration; that is, it must speak in purely literary language, without using those words that, of course, everyone uses. It's as if the artist came down from heaven.

This is the legacy of the Romantic era, which we have not yet recovered from. And in Russia we still live in some kind of era, as I call it, of the Turkish Baroque. Where a baluster is high art, but some modern art and a piece of wood is no longer high art. Not art, not culture, has nothing to do with culture in the broad sense. Profanity has no right to even enter there, because the one who swears is, as it were, uncultured. It is taken outside the brackets of the cultural process. It is generally accepted that all this is not culture, although in a broad sense, of course, it is culture. What else is this?

On his Instagram page, Shnurov publishes satirical poems on socio-political topics, commenting on current news.

On 20 February 2020, Shnurov joined the Party of Growth and became the 36th member of the St. Petersburg branch of the party. "It seems to me that I will be useful to you - at least I will bring bright colors, I will call things by their proper names. It will obviously be more fun with me," said Shnurov, receiving his party card.

On 19 March 2020, the chairman of the Party of Growth, Boris Titov, announced that Shnurov would be nominated by the party for by-elections to the Legislative Assembly of Saint Petersburg on 7 June 2020. At the party congress on 7 July, he was elected one of the co-chairs of the Party of Growth. On 16 July, Boris Titov said that Shnurov had decided to run for the State Duma in the 2021 elections, but Shnurov later denied this information.

In 2022, when asked about his position on Russia’s invasion of Ukraine, Shnurov answered:

[They say] these are times when you have to choose. [...] My rights are as follows: if I want to, I'll choose; if I don’t, I won't. They bring you a glass of vodka and a glass of whiskey, but you want wine. I don't want to choose from these options. It's only an illusion of choice.

Shnurov also spoke about the cancellation of performances by artists who condemned the invasion, and the ban on referring to the events in Ukraine as a war:

Banning words is the stupidest thing that can happen. If you don't have words to explain reality, you become mute.

A ban is in any case a sign of powerlessness. Political technology must have soft power. You have to win in rhetoric, you have to win in argument. If we ban the word "brunette", will everyone become blondes? No.

I believe that it is impossible to cancel concerts, to advise what to say to them. There should always be an opinion that you can argue with.

== See also ==
- Leningrad (band)
