= 2002 Überlingen mid-air collision =

2002 mid-air collision over Germany

2002 Überlingen mid-air collision BAL Bashkirian Airlines Flight 2937 · DHL International Aviation ME Flight 611
Accident
- Date: 1 July 2002
- Summary: Mid-air collision
- Site: Überlingen, Baden-Württemberg, Germany; 47°46′42″N 9°10′26″E
- Total fatalities: 71
- Total survivors: 0

First aircraft
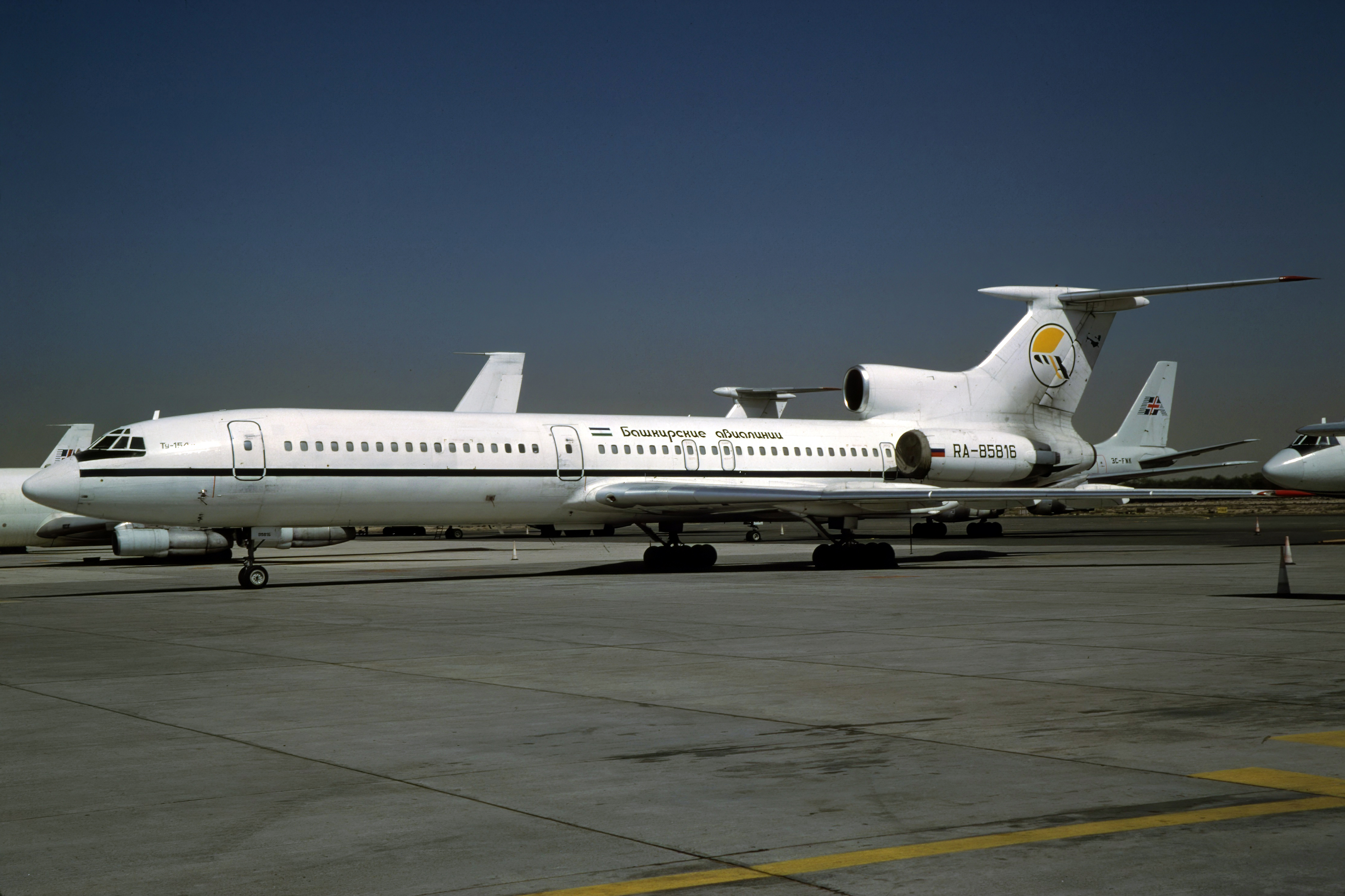
- RA-85816, the Tupolev Tu-154M involved in the collision, seen at Sharjah International Airport in March 2002
- Type: Tupolev Tu-154M
- Operator: BAL Bashkirian Airlines
- IATA flight No.: V92937
- ICAO flight No.: BTC2937
- Call sign: BRAVO TANGO CHARLIE 2937 (Note: Peter Nielsen referred to the flight as "Bravo Tango Charlie 2937" instead of the airline callsign.)
- Registration: RA-85816
- Flight origin: Domodedovo International Airport, Moscow, Russia
- Destination: Barcelona El Prat Airport, Barcelona, Spain
- Occupants: 69
- Passengers: 60
- Crew: 9
- Fatalities: 69
- Survivors: 0

Second aircraft
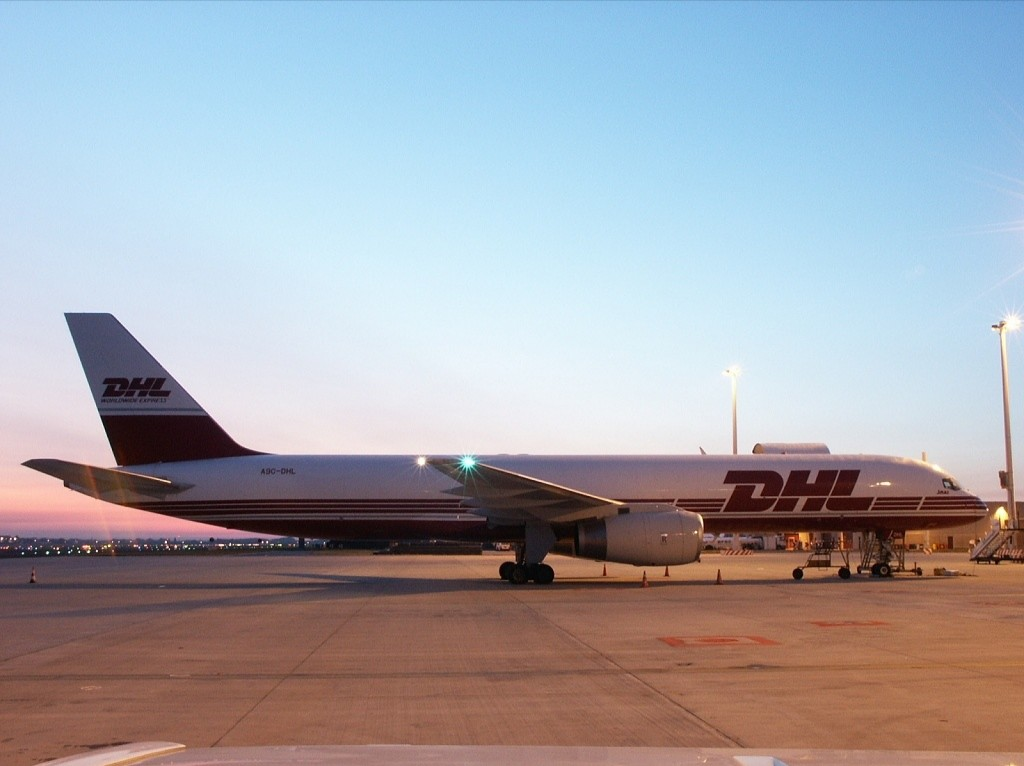
- A9C-DHL, the Boeing 757-23APF involved in the collision, seen one week before the collision
- Type: Boeing 757-23APF
- Operator: DHL International Aviation ME
- IATA flight No.: ES611
- ICAO flight No.: DHX611
- Call sign: DILMUN 611
- Registration: A9C-DHL
- Flight origin: Bahrain International Airport, Manama, Bahrain
- Stopover: Orio al Serio Airport, Bergamo, Italy
- Destination: Brussels Airport, Brussels, Belgium
- Occupants: 2
- Crew: 2
- Fatalities: 2
- Survivors: 0

On 1 July 2002, BAL Bashkirian Airlines Flight 2937, a Tupolev Tu-154 passenger jet, and DHL International Aviation ME Flight 611, a Boeing 757 cargo jet, collided in mid-air over Überlingen, a southern German town on Lake Constance, near the German-Swiss border. All of the passengers and crew aboard both planes were killed, resulting in a total death toll of 71 including 52 children.

The official investigation by the German Federal Bureau of Aircraft Accident Investigation (German: Bundesstelle für Flugunfalluntersuchung; BFU) identified the main cause of the collision to be a number of shortcomings on the part of the Swiss air traffic control (ATC) service in charge of the sector involved, as well as ambiguities in the procedures regarding the use of the traffic collision avoidance system (TCAS) on board. (Note: Section 3.2 "Causes", page 110)

On 24 February 2004, Peter Nielsen, the air traffic controller on duty at the time of the collision, was murdered in an apparent act of revenge by Vitaly Kaloyev, a Russian architect whose wife and two children died in the accident.

== Background ==
=== Tupolev aircraft and crew ===
BAL Bashkirian Airlines flight BTC2937 was a chartered flight from Moscow, Russia, to Barcelona, Spain, carrying 60 passengers and 9 crew. Forty-six of the passengers were Russian schoolchildren from the city of Ufa, in Bashkortostan, on a school trip organised by the local UNESCO committee to the Costa Daurada beach area of Catalonia. Most of the parents of the children were high-ranking officials in Bashkortostan. One of the fathers was the head of the local UNESCO committee. They travelled on an overnight train to Moscow and arrived on 29 June, then, as their driver accidentally took them to the wrong airport, they missed their original flight. They remained there for two days until 1 July in order to find the arranged chartered flight. Flight 2937 departed from Moscow Domodedovo Airport at 22:48 Moscow Time (18:48 UTC) bound for Barcelona International Airport (now Josep Tarradellas Barcelona–El Prat Airport).

The aircraft was a 1995-built Tupolev Tu-154M, with aircraft registration RA-85816.

The flight was piloted by an experienced Russian crew: 52-year-old captain Alexander Mikhailovich Gross (Russian: Александр Михайлович Гросс) and 40-year-old first officer Oleg Pavlovich Grigoriev (Russian: Олег Павлович Григорьев). The captain had more than 12,000 flight hours (including 4,918 hours on the Tu-154) to his credit. Grigoriev, the chief pilot of Bashkirian Airlines, had 8,500 hours of flying experience (with 4,317 hours on the Tu-154) and his task was to evaluate Captain Gross's performance throughout the flight.

Murat Akhatovich Itkulov (Russian: Мурат Ахатович Иткулов), a 41-year-old pilot with close to 7,900 flight hours (4,181 of them on the Tu-154), who was normally the first officer, did not officially serve on duty because this was the captain's assessment flight. Sergei Gennadievich Kharlov (Russian: Сергей Геннадьевич Харлов), a 50-year-old flight navigator with approximately 13,000 flight hours (including 6,421 hours on the Tu-154), and Oleg Irikovich Valeyev (Russian: Олег Ирикович Валеев), a 37-year-old flight engineer who had almost 4,200 flight hours (all of which were on the Tu-154), joined the three pilots in the cockpit.

=== Boeing aircraft and crew ===
DHL International Aviation ME flight 611 was a 1990-built Boeing 757-23APF in service with DHL International and registered in Bahrain as A9C-DHL. The flight was being flown by two Bahrain-based pilots, 47-year-old British Captain Paul Phillips and 34-year-old Canadian first officer Brant Campioni, who had to fly the second leg of the journey. Both pilots were very experienced — Phillips had logged close to 12,000 flight hours (including 4,145 hours on the 757) and Campioni had accumulated more than 6,600 flight hours, with 176 of them on the Boeing 757. Campioni had also previously worked as an air cadet and corporal in the Canadian Military Engineers. At the time of the accident, the aircraft was en route from Bahrain International Airport in Manama, Bahrain, to Brussels Airport in Brussels, Belgium, with a stop at Orio al Serio Airport in Bergamo, Italy, and departed Bergamo at 23:06 CEST (21:06 UTC).

== Accident ==
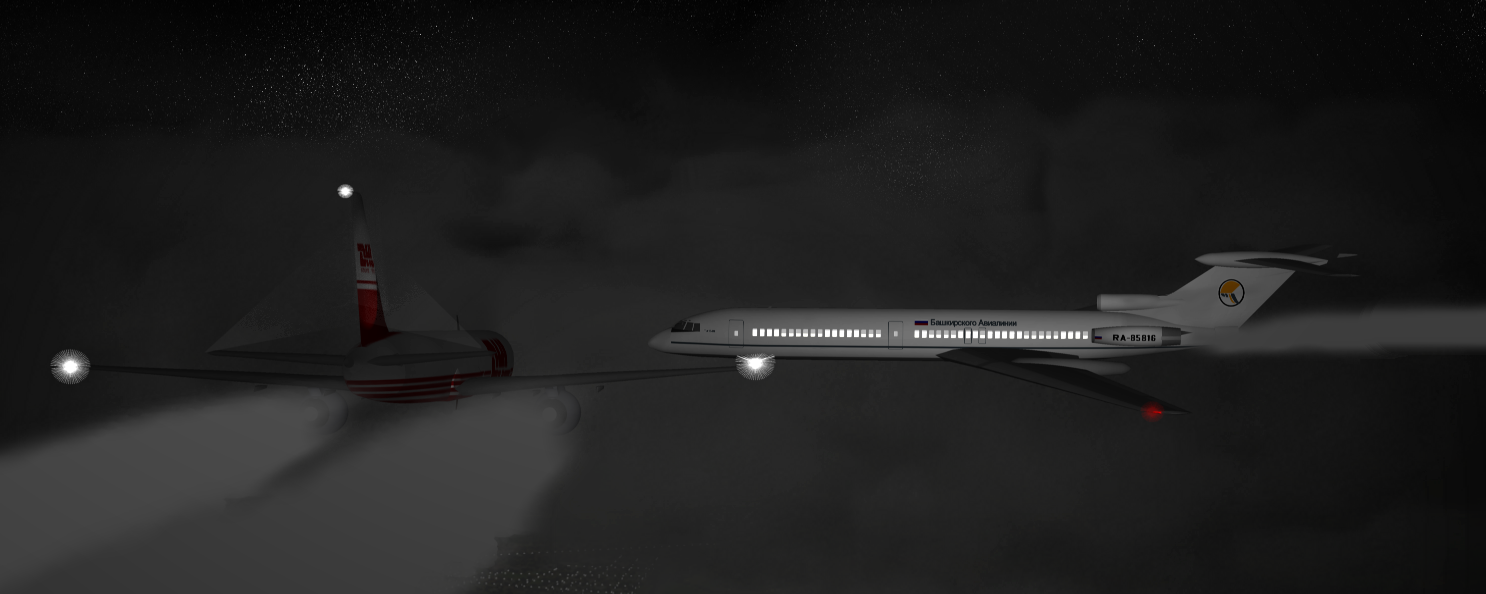
CGI rendering of the accident

The crash site, as shown within Germany

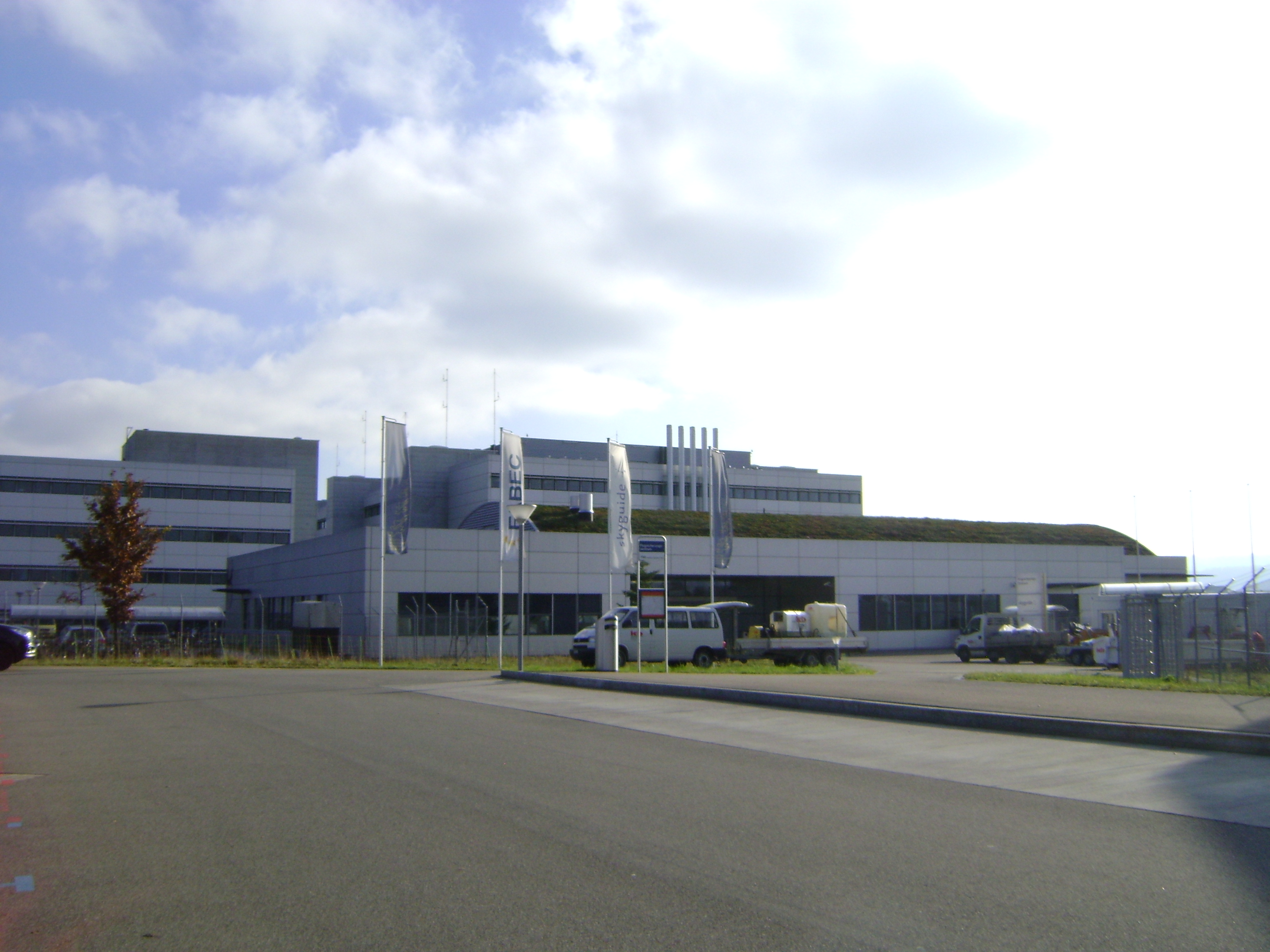
Skyguide Air Navigation Center Zürich in Wangen bei Dübendorf

The airspace was controlled from Zürich, Switzerland, by the Swiss federal airspace control Skyguide. Air traffic controller Peter Nielsen, the only controller handling the airspace, was burdened with working two workstations at the same time.

At 23:21 CEST (21:21 UTC), DHL Flight 611 reported to the area control center responsible for southern German airspace. Nielsen then instructed Flight 611 to climb from flight level 260 (26,000 ft (7,900 m)) to flight level 320 (32,000 ft (9,800 m)). Flight 611 requested permission to continue the climb to flight level 360 (36,000 feet (11,000 m)) to save fuel. Nielsen permitted Flight 611 to climb after about four to five minutes, after which Flight 611 reached the desired altitude at 23:29. Meanwhile, Flight 2937 contacted Nielsen at 23:30, which also reported to be at flight level 360. Nielsen acknowledged the flight, but did not assign a different altitude to either aircraft. That meant that both were now at the same altitude and on a collision course.

At 23:34:49 CEST (21:34:49 UTC), about a minute before the collision, Flight 2937's TCAS instructed them to climb; seconds later, Nielsen, realizing the oncoming danger, contacted Flight 2937 and instructed the pilot to descend to flight level 350 (1000 ft lower) to avoid collision with crossing traffic (Flight 611). The crew of Flight 2937 disengaged the autopilot and initiated their descent at 23:35, obeying the controller instead of the TCAS. At about the same time, the TCAS on Flight 611 instructed the crew of that aircraft to descend. (Note: Section 4 "Safety Recommendations", pages 111–113) The collision would thus not have occurred if both the aircraft's crews had obeyed the TCAS's instructions. (Note: Section 1.16.2 "ACAS/TCAS II analysis", page 34)

Flight 611's pilots followed their TCAS instructions and initiated a descent, but could not immediately inform Nielsen as he was dealing with Flight 2937. The crew of Flight 2937, however, descended as instructed by Nielsen, (Note: Section 2.7 "Analysis summary", pages 104–106) contrary to the TCAS's instructions which advised the crew to climb. Both planes were now descending.

Unaware of the TCAS-issued alerts, Nielsen repeated his instruction to Flight 2937 to descend, giving the crew incorrect information as to the position of the DHL plane, telling them that the plane was to the right (2 o'clock position) when it was in fact to the left (10 o'clock position). (Note: Section 2.4.1 "ATC Zurich", page 76) About eight seconds before the collision, Flight 611's descent rate was about 12 m/s (2,400 ft/min), not quite as rapid as the 13 to 15 m/s (2,500 to 3,000 ft/min) range advised by the TCAS.

Flight 611, responding to the developing situation, increased its descent rate. (Note: Section 1.1.1 "Boeing B757-200", pages 6–7) (Note: Section 1.1.2 "Tupolev TU154M", pages 7–9) Eight seconds before the collision, Flight 2937's crew became aware of the situation when they gained visual sight of Flight 611 incoming from the left, and, two seconds before the collision, obeyed their TCAS instruction and attempted to put the aircraft into a climb. Unfortunately, the collision had by then become inevitable. The two aircraft collided at 23:35:32 CEST (21:35:32 UTC), at almost a right angle, at an altitude of 10,630 m (34,890 ft), with Flight 611's vertical stabilizer slicing completely through Flight 2937's fuselage just ahead of the wings. Flight 2937 broke into several pieces, scattering wreckage into the Brachenreute neighborhood over a wide area. The nose section of the aircraft fell vertically, while the tail section with the engines continued, stalled, and fell. Many of the children's bodies fell in the field just southeast of the memorial.

Flight 611, now with 80% of its vertical stabilizer lost, entered a flat spin dive, and continued for a further 7 kilometres (4.3 mi; 3.8 nmi) for two minutes, before crashing into a wooded area close to the village of Taisersdorf at a 70° downward angle. Each engine ended up several hundred meters away from the main wreckage after being torn from the plane due to airframe stress, causing the black boxes to stop before the plane hit the ground, and the tail section was torn from the fuselage by trees just before impact. (Note: Section 1.12 "Wreckages and impacts information", pages 19–33) All 69 people on board Flight 2937 and the two crew members on board Flight 611 died. (Note: Section 1.2 "Injuries to persons", page 9)

== Other factors in the crash ==
Only one air traffic controller (ATC), Peter Nielsen of ACC Zurich, was controlling the airspace through which the aircraft were flying. The other controller on duty was resting in another room for the night. This was against Skyguide's regulations, but had been a common practice for years and was known and tolerated by management. Maintenance work was being carried out on the main radar image processing system, which meant that the controllers were forced to use a fallback system. Telephone systems were also under maintenance, preventing contact between other air traffic controllers. A delayed Aero Lloyd flight approached Friedrichshafen at a time when no additional landings were expected that night, and with the telephone system under maintenance, Nielsen was forced to remain in contact with the pilots until they came within radio range of the Friedrichshafen tower, while the other two planes neared collision. (Note: Section 1.17.1 "ATC Zurich", pages 35–42)

The ground-based optical collision warning system, which would have alerted the controller to the pending collision about two minutes before it happened, (Note: Section 2.6.1.4 "Warning systems", page 88) had been switched off for maintenance. Nielsen was unaware of this. An aural short-term conflict alert warning system released a warning addressed to workstation RE SUED at 23:35:00 (32 seconds before the collision). This warning was not heard by anyone present at that time, although no error in this system could be found in a subsequent technical audit; however, whether or not this audible warning is functional is not something that is technically logged. Even if Nielsen had heard this warning, at that time finding a useful resolution order by the ATC was impossible.

=== Deviating statements in the official report ===
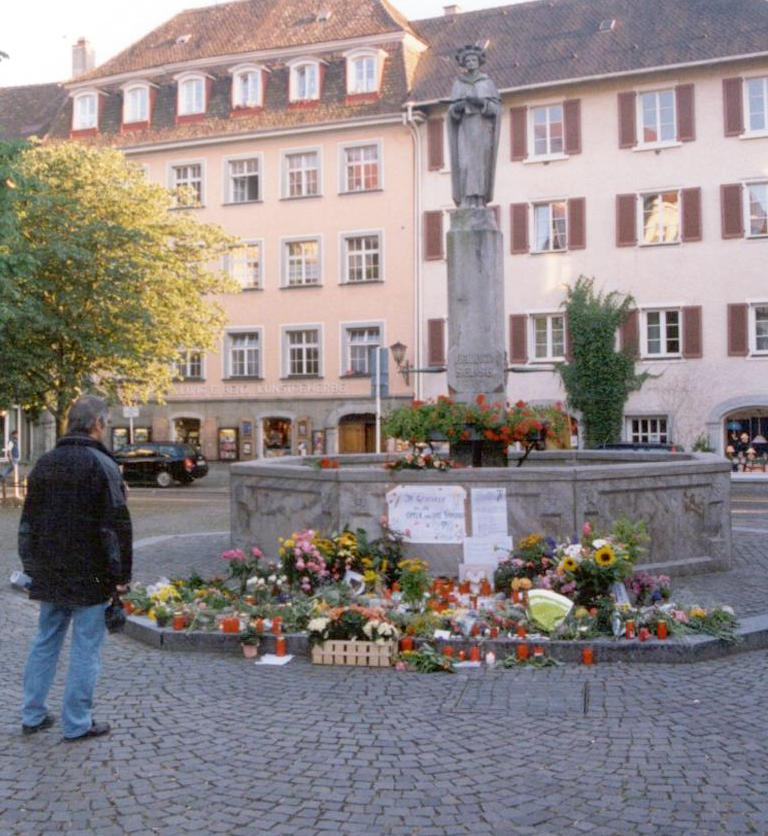
A temporary memorial at Überlingen's Sosa Fountain

All countries involved could add additional "deviating" statements to the official report. Bahrain, Switzerland, and Russia did submit positions that were published with the official report. The deviating statements were published verbatim as an appendix to the report by the BFU investigators.

The statement by Bahrain, the home country of the DHL plane, mostly agrees with the findings of the report. It says that the report should have put less emphasis on the actions of individuals and more on the faults within Skyguide's organization and management. Bahrain's statement also mentions the lack of crew resource management in the Tupolev's cockpit as a factor in the crash.

Russia states that the Russian pilots were unable to obey the TCAS advisory to climb; the advisory was given when they were already at 10,800 m (35,500 ft), while the controller wrongly stated conflicting traffic was above them at 11,000 m (36,000 ft). Also, the ATC gave the wrong position of the DHL plane (2 o'clock instead of the actual 10 o'clock). Russia asserts that the DHL crew had a "real possibility" to avoid a collision, since they were able to hear the conversation between the Russian crew and the controller.

Switzerland notes that the Tupolev was about 33 m (108 ft) below the flight level ordered by the Swiss controller, and still descending at 580 m/min (1,900 ft/min). The Swiss say that this was also a cause of the accident. Switzerland also requested that the BFU make a formal finding that the TCAS advisories would have been useful if obeyed immediately; the BFU declined to do so.

== Aftermath ==
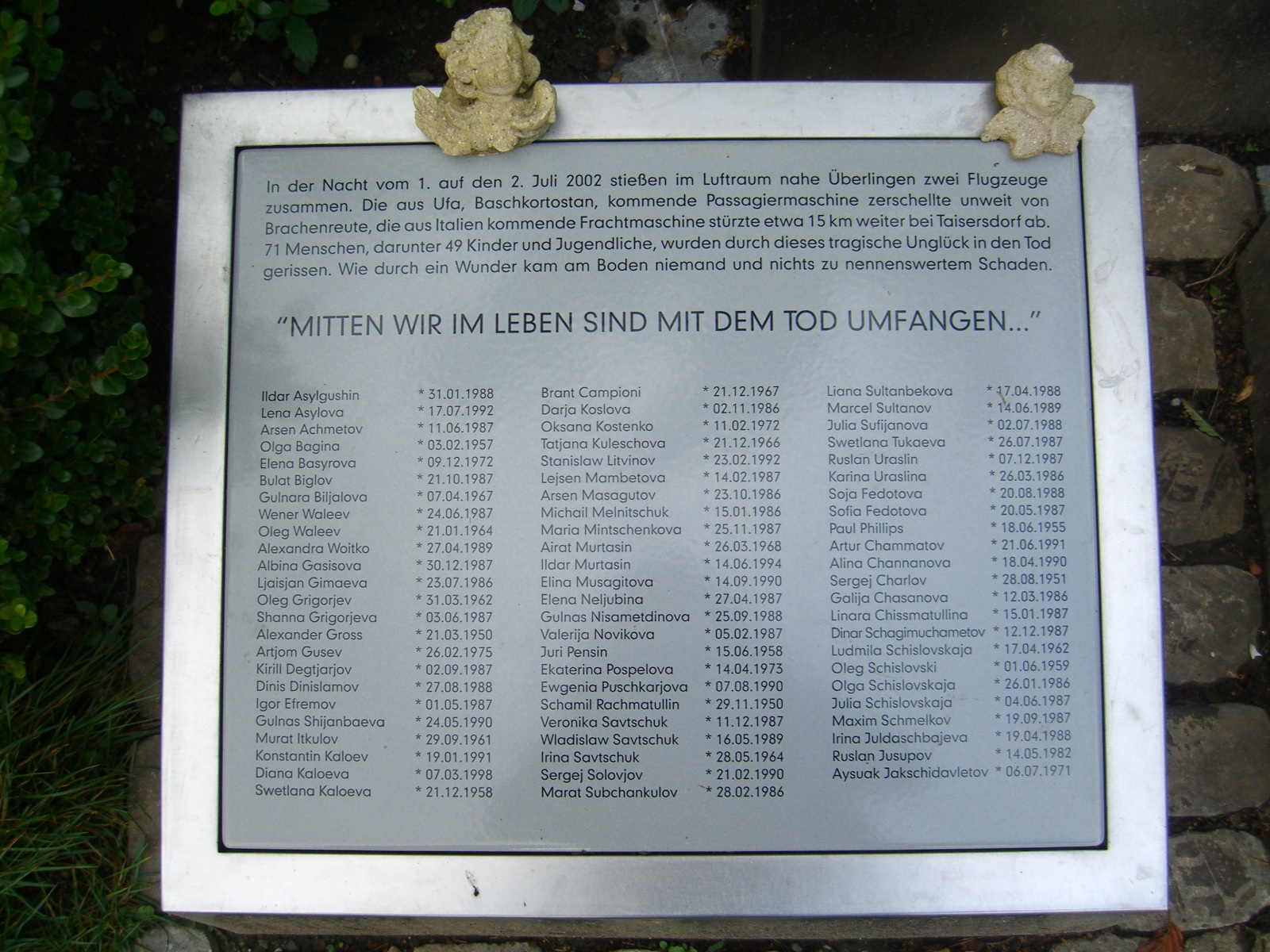
A memorial plaque

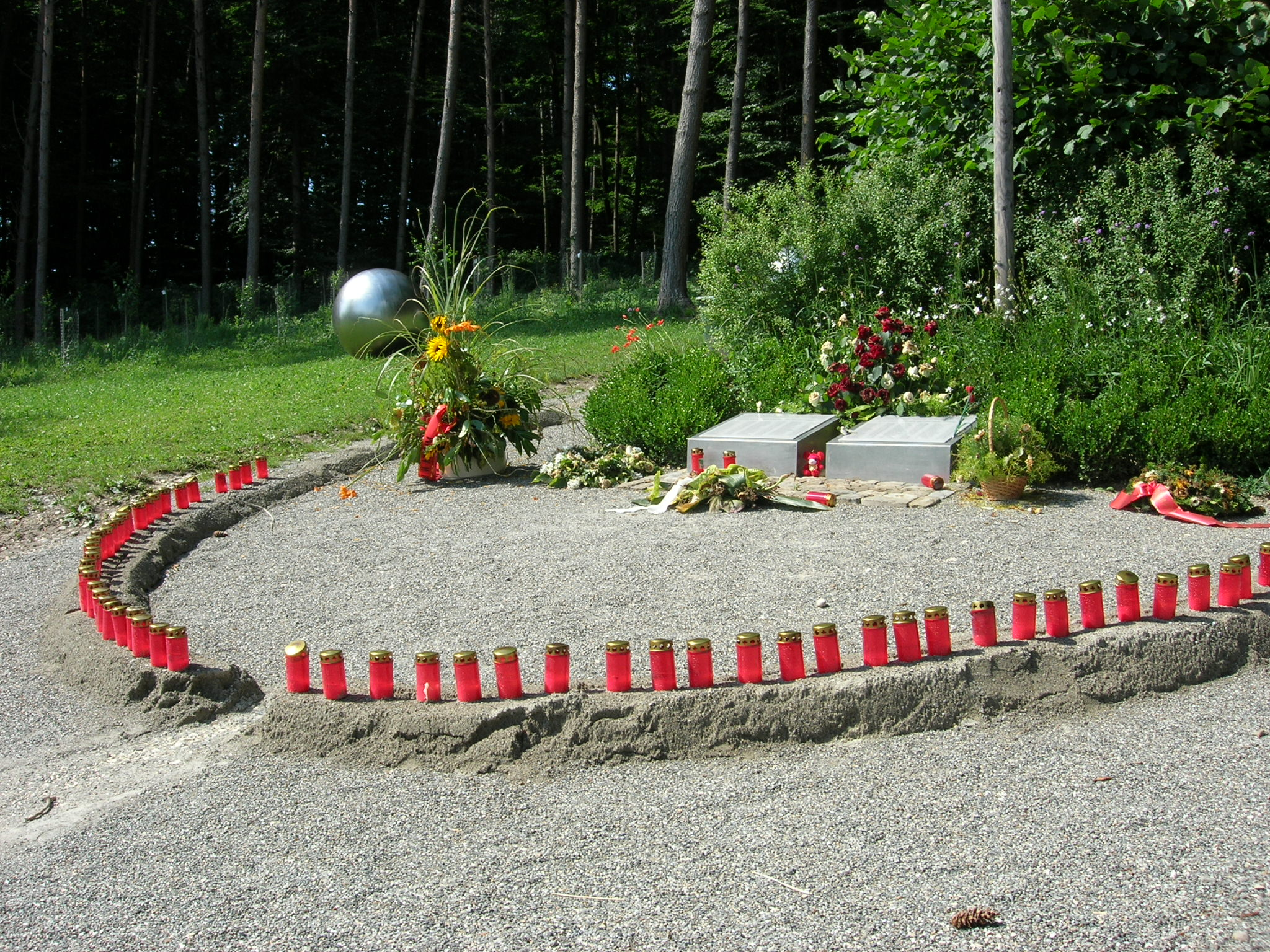
The Überlingen memorial

Nielsen needed medical attention due to traumatic stress caused by the accident. At Skyguide, his former colleagues maintained a vase with a white rose over Nielsen's former workstation. Skyguide, after initially having blamed the Russian pilot for the accident, accepted full responsibility and asked relatives of the victims for forgiveness.

The Broken Pearl Necklace memorial was built in memory of the incident near Brachenreute, where much of the wreckage of flight 2937 landed.

Skyguide paid compensation to the families of the dead children; the compensation amount was about CHF 30,000 – 36,000 (US$22,300 – 26,700 at the time). The Swiss Federal Court turned down appeals from some relatives for higher compensation in 2011.

On 27 July 2006, a court in Konstanz decided that Germany should pay compensation to Bashkirian Airlines. The court found that Germany was legally responsible for the actions of Skyguide. The government appealed the ruling, but in late 2013, Bashkirian Airlines and Germany reached a tacit agreement, ending the court case before a decision on the legal issues was reached.

In another case before the court in Konstanz, Skyguide's liability insurance is suing Bashkirian Airlines for 2.5 million euro in damages. The case was opened in March 2008; the legal questions are expected to be difficult, as the airline has filed for bankruptcy under Russian law.

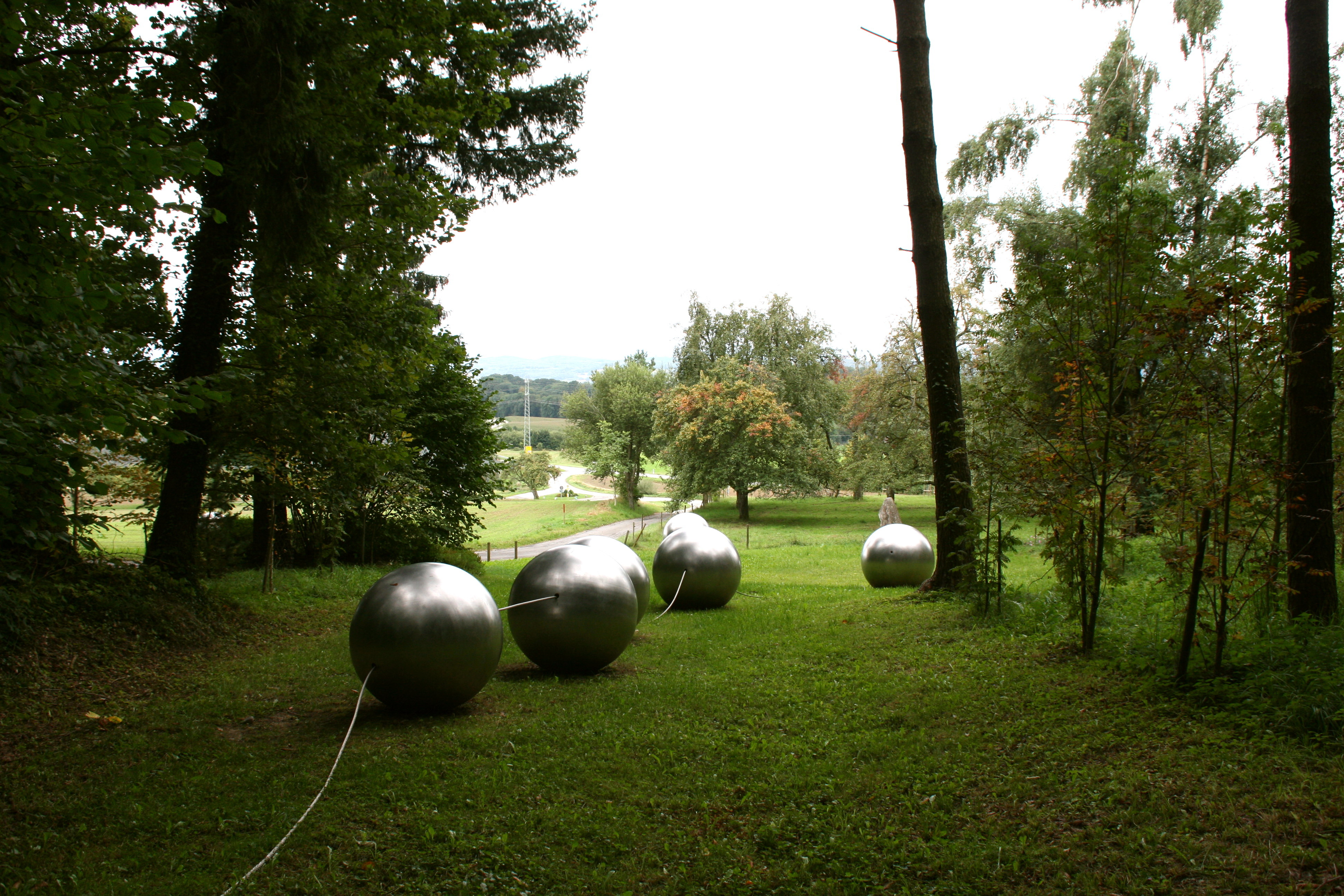
The "Broken Pearl Necklace" memorial

A criminal investigation of Skyguide began in May 2004. On 7 August 2006, a Swiss prosecutor filed manslaughter charges against eight employees of Skyguide. The prosecutor called for prison terms up to 15 months if found guilty. The verdict was announced in September 2007. Three of the four managers convicted were given suspended prison terms and the fourth was ordered to pay a fine. Another four Skyguide employees were cleared of any wrongdoing.

=== Murder of Peter Nielsen ===
Devastated by the death of his wife and two children aboard flight 2937, Vitaly Kaloyev, a Russian architect, held Peter Nielsen personally responsible for their deaths. He tracked down and stabbed Nielsen to death, in the presence of Nielsen's wife and three children, at his home in Kloten, near Zürich, on 24 February 2004. The Swiss police arrested Kaloyev at a local motel shortly afterward, and in 2005, he was sentenced to eight years for manslaughter. However, his sentence was later reduced after a Swiss judge ruled that he had acted with diminished responsibility.

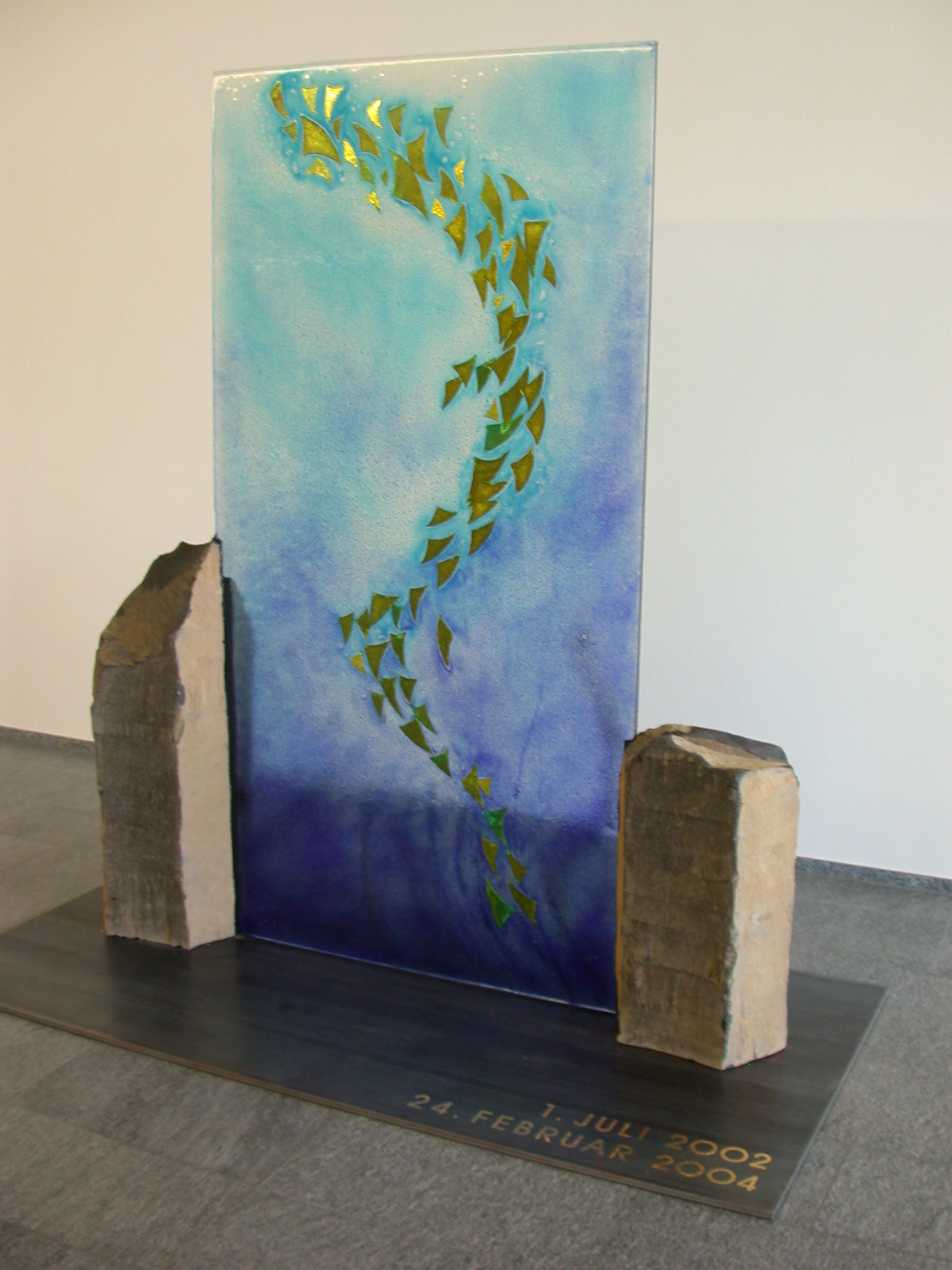
The Skyguide memorial to the aviation accident and killing of Peter Nielsen

He was released in November 2007, having spent three and a half years in prison, because his mental condition was not sufficiently considered in the initial sentence. In January 2008, he was appointed deputy construction minister of North Ossetia. Kaloyev was treated as a hero back home at Vladikavkaz, and expressed no regret for his actions, instead blaming the victim for his own death. In 2016, Kaloyev was awarded the highest state medal by the government, the medal "To the Glory of Ossetia". The medal is awarded for the highest achievements, improving the living conditions of the inhabitants of the region, educating the younger generation, and maintaining law and order.

== TCAS and conflicting orders ==
The accident raised questions as to how pilots must react when they receive conflicting orders from TCAS and ATC. TCAS was a relatively new technology at the time of the accident, having been mandatory (Note: TCAS was mandatory for aircraft with a maximum certified take-off weight over 30 tonnes or a seating capacity over 30 passengers. Both aircraft involved in this accident met the criteria for mandatory TCAS installation.) in Europe since 2000. When TCAS issues a resolution advisory (RA), the pilot flying should respond immediately by directing attention to RA displays and maneuvering as indicated, unless doing so would jeopardise the safe operation of the flight, or unless the flight crew can assure separation with the help of definitive visual acquisition of the aircraft causing the RA.

In responding to a TCAS RA that directs a deviation from assigned altitude, the flight crew should communicate with ATC as soon as practicable after responding to the RA. When the RA is removed, the flight crew should advise ATC that they are returning to their previously assigned clearance or should acknowledge any amended clearance issued.

While TCAS is programmed to assume that both crews will promptly follow the system's instructions, the operations manual did not clearly state that TCAS should always take precedence over any ATC commands. (Note: page 103: "Paragraph 6.1 of the TCAS Pilot's Guide states "TCAS 2000 is intended as a back-up to visual collision avoidance, application of 'right-of-way' rules, and ATC separation services", and leaves a degree of ambiguity over the interpretation of the term 'back-up'.") The manual described TCAS as "a backup to the ATC system", which could be wrongly interpreted to mean that ATC instructions have higher priority. (Note: page 80 "The wording "TCAS is a backup to the ATC system..." could be interpreted that ATC takes priority to TCAS") This ambiguity was replicated in the Tu-154 Flight Operations Manual, which contained contradictory sections. On the one hand, chapter 8.18.3.4 emphasised the role of ATC and describes TCAS as an "additional aid", (Note: page 53 "For the avoidance of in-flight collisions is the visual control of the situation in the airspace by the crew and the correct execution of all instructions issued by the Air Traffic Controller to be viewed as the most important tool. TCAS is an additional instrument that ensures the timely determination of oncoming traffic, the classification of the risk, and if necessary, planning of an advice for a vertical avoidance manoeuvre." – TU154M Flight Operations Manual) while chapter 8.18.3.2 forbade manoeuvres contrary to TCAS. The BFU recommended that this ambiguity should be resolved in favor of obeying TCAS advisories even when these were in conflict with ATC instructions. (Note: page 111 "Safety Recommendation 18/2003")

=== Prior incident ===
About a year before the incident, another incident had occurred involving confusion between conflicting TCAS and ATC commands. In 2001, two Japanese airliners nearly collided with each other in Japanese airspace. One of the aircraft had received conflicting orders from TCAS and ATC; one pilot followed the instructions of TCAS, while the other did not. A collision was only averted because one of the pilots made evasive manoeuvres based on a visual judgment. The aircraft missed each other by about 135 m (443 ft), and the abrupt maneuver necessary to avert disaster left 100 occupants injured on one aircraft, some seriously. Japan published its report 11 days after the Überlingen accident, in it calling on the International Civil Aviation Organization (ICAO) to make it clear that TCAS advisories should always take precedence over ATC instructions. ICAO accepted this recommendation and amended its regulations in November 2003.

=== Technical solutions ===
Before this accident, a change proposal (CP 112) for the TCAS II system had been issued. This proposal would have created a "reversal" of the original warning – asking the DHL plane to climb and the Tupolev crew to descend. According to an analysis by Eurocontrol, this would have avoided the collision if the DHL crew had received and followed the new instructions and the Tupolev had continued to descend. All TCAS II equipped aircraft have been upgraded to support RA reversal.

Additionally, an automatic downlink for TCAS, which would have alerted the controller that a TCAS advisory had been issued to the aircraft under their control, and notified them of the nature of that advisory, had not been deployed worldwide at the time of the accident.

=== Recommendations after the accident ===
The investigation report contains a number of recommendations concerning TCAS, calling for upgrades, better training and clearer instructions to the pilots. (Note: Section 4 "Safety Recommendations", pages 111–113) The TCAS II system was redesigned, with its ambiguous "Adjust Vertical Speed" RA voice command changed to "Level-Off", to increase proper responses from pilots.

== In media ==
=== Films ===
- The crash and the subsequent killing of the ATC were used as the basis of a motion picture produced by German and Swiss TV stations SWR and SF, called Flug in die Nacht – Das Unglück von Überlingen (Flight into the Night – the Accident at Überlingen) (2009), starring Ken Duken as Nielsen and Evgeni Sitochin as Kaloyev.
- The U.S. film Aftermath (2017) is loosely based on the Überlingen mid-air collision, starring Arnold Schwarzenegger as a character largely based on Kaloyev.
- The Russian film Unforgiven (2018) is based on the Überlingen mid-air collision, with Dmitry Nagiyev portraying Kaloyev.

=== Music ===
- "Ballad of Vitaly", the closing track on the U.S. rock band Delta Spirit's album History from Below (2010), recounts the story of the midair collision and Vitaly Kaloyev's actions following the crash.
- The German futurepop band Edge of Dawn alludes to Kaloyev's story and mentions his name in the song "The Flight (Lux)", which appears on their EP The Flight (2005) and their full-length album Enjoy the Fall (2007).
- Russian rock-band "Year of Snake" has created a song 2000 bucks for a cigarette about unrelated topics: friendship, treachery, love and smoking addiction. Later the band lead Alexei Markovnikov has repurposed some lyrics of the song to create an eponymous air traffic control themed power ballad loosely-based on the accident. The ballad was published using the name of a non-existing rock band "Air traffic controllers". The song text is of the second controller going smoking due to severe smoking addiction, irresponsibly leaving another one to work alone for some time.

=== Podcasts ===
- On 3 and 10 February 2019, Casefile True Crime Podcast: "Peter Nielsen", Case 106 (Parts 1 and 2) covered the story of the mid-air collision and subsequent killing of the former Skyguide controller Peter Nielsen, by Russian architect Vitaly Kaloyev.
- On 12 January 2021, the Hard Landings podcast covered the story in Episode 64: The Überlingen Mid-air Collision.
- On 5 May 2022, the Rooster Teeth Black Box Down podcast covered the story in Episode Season 3, episode 17: Accident Ends in Murder / Accident Ends in Murder / The Überlingen Mid-air Collision.
- On 3 March 2023, the Take to the Sky: the Air Disaster Podcast covered the story in "Episode 137: The Uberlingen Midair Disaster."

=== Television ===
- The collision featured in multiple segments of the Canadian TV series Mayday:
  - "Deadly Crossroads", a season-two episode (2005) (called Air Emergency and Air Disasters in the U.S. and Air Crash Investigation in the UK and elsewhere around the world). The dramatisation was broadcast in the United States with the title "A Father's Revenge"; and with the title "Mid-Air Collision" in the United Kingdom, Australia, and Asia. Kaloyev was played by actor Kresimir Bosiljevac, while Nielsen was played by actor Stephen Sparks.
  - "Collision Catastrophe", a season twenty-five episode broadcast in 2025 with an entirely different cast.
  - The flight was also included in a Mayday season-eight (2009) Science of Disaster special titled "System Breakdown", which looked at the role of air traffic controllers in aviation disasters.
- The National Geographic Channel documentary series Seconds from Disaster featured this mid-air collision in the episode entitled "Collision at 35,000 feet", released on 26 September 2011.
- The episode is dramatized in the episode "Fatal Flaws" of Why Planes Crash.

=== Theatre ===
In the U.S. off-Broadway play My Eyes Went Dark, which opened 7 June 2017 and closed 2 July, playwright and director Matthew Wilkinson tells Kaloyev's story, which featured, among other characters, Declan Conlon as Kaloyev and Thusitha Jayasundera as his wife. It played at 59E59 Theaters in New York City.

== See also ==
- List of mid-air collisions
