= Tatiana Bulanova discography =

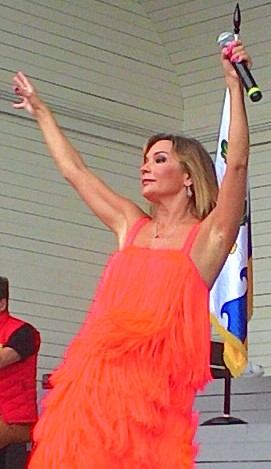
- Tatiana Bulanova in Sestroretsk in 2015
- Studio albums: 25
- Compilation albums: 10
- Singles: 112
- Video albums: 1
- Music videos: 45

Russian singer Tatiana Bulanova has released twenty-five studio albums, ten compilation album, one video album, one hundred and twelve singles, and forty-five music videos.

== Albums ==
=== Studio albums ===
Title	Album details
25 gvozdik (featuring Letny sad)	Released: 1990; Label: Self-publishing; Formats: Magnitoalbom
Ne plach (featuring Letny sad)	Released: 1991; Label: Russky disk; Formats: Magnitoalbom, LP
Starshaya sestra (featuring Letny sad)	Released: 1992; Label: Russky disk; Formats: Magnitoalbom, LP
Strannaya vstrecha (featuring Letny sad)	Released: 1993; Label: Bekar Records; Formats: LP, cassette
Izmena (featuring Letny sad)	Released: 1994; Label: Bekar Records; Formats: LP, cassette
Obratny bilet	Released: 1996; Label: Soyuz; Formats: CD, cassette
Moyo russkoye serdtse	Released: 1996; Label: Soyuz; Formats: CD, cassette
Sterpitsya – slyubitsya	Released: 1997; Label: Soyuz; Formats: CD, cassette
Zhenskoye serdtse	Released: 1998; Label: Extraphone; Formats: CD, cassette
Staya	Released: 1999; Label: Iceberg Music; Formats: CD, cassette
Moy son (featuring DJ Tsvetkоff)	Released: 2000; Label: Real Records, Iceberg Music; Formats: CD, cassette
Den rozhdeniya	Released: 2001; Label: Grand Records; Formats: CD, cassette
Zoloto lyubvi	Released: 2001; Label: Iceberg Music; Formats: CD, cassette
Krasnoye na belom	Released: 2002; Label: JRC; Formats: CD, cassette
Eto igra	Released: 2002; Label: Iceberg Music; Formats: CD, cassette
Lyubov	Released: 2003; Label: Artur Music; Formats: CD, cassette
Belaya cheryomukha	Released: 2004; Label: АРС Records; Formats: CD, cassette
Letela dusha	Released: 2005; Label: ARS Records; Formats: CD, cassette
Lyublyu i skuchayu	Released: 2007; Label: Kvadro-Disk; Formats: CD, cassette
Romansy	Released: 1 December 2010; Label: Bomba-Piter; Formats: CD
Eto ya	Released: 29 December 2017; Label: Soyuz; Formats: Digital download, CD
Yedinstvenny dom	Released: 6 August 2020; Label: United Music Group; Formats: Digital download, CD
Tanya, dyshi!	Released: 18 March 2023; Label: United Music Group; Formats: Digital download, CD
Kameo	Released: 7 March 2024; Label: United Music Group; Formats: Digital download, CD
Pripomnim yunost	Released: 26 September 2024; Label: United Music Group; Formats: Digital download

=== Compilations ===
Title	Album details
Ballady (featuring Letny sad)	Released: 1993; Label: Self-publishing; Formats: CD, cassette
Ya svedu tebya s uma (featuring Letny sad)	Released: 1995; Label: Soyuz; Formats: CD, cassette
Skoro bol proydyot (featuring Letny sad)	Released: 1995; Label: Soyuz; Formats: CD, cassette
The Best	Released: 1998; Label: Soyuz; Formats: CD, cassette
Letny son	Released: 2001; Label: Iceberg Music; Formats: CD, cassette
Beloye na krasnom	Released: 2002; Label: JRC; Formats: CD, cassette
Kollektsyya	Released: 2002; Label: Soyuz; Formats: Box-set (4xCD)
Antialbom (featuring Kardinal)	Released: 2002; Label: NEMONO Entertainment; Formats: CD, cassette
Bolshaya kollektsiya	Released: 13 October 2014; Label: Soyuz; Formats: Digital download
Luchshaya	Released: 14 August 2018; Label: Soyuz; Formats: LP

=== Video albums ===
Title	Album details
Sterpitsya – slyubitsya	Released: 1997; Label: Soyuz; Formats: VHS

== Singles ==
List of singles for airplay and digital download
Title	Year	Peak chart positions			Album
Title	Year	CIS	RUS	UKR	Album
"V gorode vesna" (featuring Russkiy Razmer)	2003	—	—	—	Tsuzamen
"Angel"	2003	—	—	—	Zhenskoye serdtse
"Dozhdi-pistolety" (featuring Zveri)	2004	99	34	55	Belaya cheryomukha
"Prityazheniye"	2006	91	—	80	Lyublyu i skuchayu
"Lyublyu i skuchayu"	2008	180	59	—	Lyublyu i skuchayu
"Ty sogrey menya"	2009	—	—	—	Eto ya
"Beskonechnaya istoriya"	2009	29	23	49	Eto ya
"Ya ne vernus"	2010	171	—	—	Eto ya
"Ranennye ptitsy" (featuring Sergey Pereverzev)	2012	—	—	—	Non-album singles
"Tsvetok" (featuring Sergey Lyubavin)	2013	—	—	—	Non-album singles
"Razvedeny mosty" (featuring Alexander Inshakov)	2013	—	—	—	Non-album singles
"Vperyod, Zenit!"	2013	—	—	—	Non-album singles
"S etogo dnya" (featuring Konstantin Kostomarov)	2013	111	—	89	Non-album singles
"Kak po telu tok"	2013	—	—	—	Eto ya
"Nikogda ne govori - nikoga" (featuring Alexander Lominsky)	2013	44	43	75	Non-album single
"Dimka"	2014	—	—	—	Eto ya
"Papa s nami"	2014	—	—	—	Eto ya
"Ne plach" (Vengerov & Fedoroff Radio Mix)	2015	123	—	—	Non-album single
"Ne boytes lyubvi"	2016	—	46	—	Eto ya
"Proshchay lyubov moya" (featuring Kai Metov)	2016	—	—	—	Non-album singles
"A ty lyubi" (featuring Vladimir Vanin)	2016	—	—	—	Non-album singles
"Aprel"	2016	—	—	—	Eto ya
"Chelovek i koshka" (featuring Nol)	2017	—	—	—	Eto ya
"Plach, lyubov"	2017	—	—	—	Eto ya
"Ne para" (featuring Igor Latyshko)	2017	—	—	—	Non-album single
"Ty i ya navsegda"	2017	—	—	—	Eto ya
"Zvezdopad" (featuring Edgar)	2017	—	—	—	A ty menya lyubi
"V dome, gde zhivyot moya pechal"	2017	—	—	—	Eto ya
"Tam gde ostalis my" (featuring Oleg Popkov)	2017	—	—	—	Non-album single
"Ty i ya navsegda" (O'neill Remix)	2018	—	—	—	Eto ya
"Prosti, mne ne prostitsya"	2018	—	—	—	Non-album singles
"Belye dorogi" (featuring ParaTayn)	2019	—	—	—	Non-album singles
"Piter" (featuring Alexey Arabov)	2019	—	—	—	Non-album singles
"Samy krasivy tsvetok" (featuring Fyodor Chistyakov)	2019	—	—	—	Non-album singles
"Igrayu v pryatki na sudbu"	2019	75	65	—	Non-album singles
"Svoy" (featuring Oleg Popkov)	2019	—	—	—	Non-album singles
"Torzhestvo lyubvi" (featuring Viktor Tartanov)	2019	—	—	—	Non-album singles
"Dva berega" (featuring Konstantin Kostomarov)	2019	—	—	—	Non-album singles
"V sokolnikakh" (featuring Pavel Sokolov)	2019	—	—	—	Non-album singles
"Zdravstvuy, novy god"	2019	—	—	—	Non-album singles
"Sto shagov"	2020	—	—	—	Non-album singles
"Ya busu pomnit o khoroshem"	2020	—	—	—	Non-album singles
"Dni letyat"	2020	170	—	—	Non-album singles
"Gorodok okolo morya" (featuring Andrey Kosinsky)	2020	—	—	—	Non-album singles
"Yasny moy svet" (Velum Remix)	2020	—	—	—	Non-album singles
"Soschitay do tryokh" (featuring Ivan Ilyushikhin)	2020	—	—	—	Non-album singles
"Pozhelay"	2020	—	—	—	Non-album singles
"Raznyye sudby" (featuring Artyom Anchukov)	2020	—	—	—	Non-album singles
"Ranena"	2021	—	—	—	Non-album singles
"Arkhangelsk" (featuring Pilot)	2021	—	—	—	Tygydym
"Moy Prazdnik"	2021	—	—	—	Non-album singles
"Dve melodii serdtsa" (featuring Ivan Ilyushikhin)	2021	—	—	—	Non-album singles
"Lego" (featuring Denis Fateev)	2021	—	—	—	Non-album singles
"Magiya"	2022	—	—	—	Kameo
"Poezda"	2022	—	—	—	Kameo
"Tanya, dyshi"	2022	—	—	—	Tanya, dyshi!
"Do svidaniya" (featuring Gonopolsky)	2022	—	—	—	Non-album singles
"Molitva" (featuring Mekhdi Ibragimi Vafa)	2022	—	—	—	Non-album singles
"Brillianty na snegu"	2022	—	—	—	Tanya, dyshi!
"Ya budu iskat tebya"	2022	—	—	—	Non-album single
"Skayp"	2023	—	—	—	Tanya, dyshi!
"S toboy odnim golosom"	2023	—	—	—	Tanya, dyshi!
"Ty moy kosmos"	2023	—	—	—	Tanya, dyshi!
"Ty vzroslaya" (featuring Gonopolsky)	2023	—	—	—	Non-album single
"Na rasstoyanii"	2023	—	—	—	Tanya, dyshi!
"Skolzky pol" (featuring Gonopolsky)	2023	—	—	—	Non-album singles
"Razgulyay" (featuring Yelena Shevchenko)	2023	—	—	—	Non-album singles
"Chuzhaya tachka" (featuring Gonopolsky)	2023	—	—	—	Non-album singles
"Igry" (featuring Roman Ruabtsev)	2023	—	—	—	Non-album singles
"Ognyom" (featuring Nikita Balakshin)	2023	—	—	—	Non-album singles
"Bely-siny-krsny" (featuring Yuliana Yan)	2023	—	—	—	Non-album singles
"Mir pod nazvaniyem Lyubov"	2023	—	—	—	Non-album singles
"Ya nauchilas proshchat"	2023	—	—	—	Non-album singles
"Seraya osen"	2023	—	—	—	Non-album singles
"Bez granits" (featuring TNL51 and Sergey Rogozhin)	2023	—	—	—	Non-album singles
"Paradoks" (featuring A-Chernyshev)	2023	—	—	—	Non-album singles
"Semeyny albom" (featuring Alina Deliss)	2023	—	—	—	Non-album singles
"Shans na lyubov" (featuring Alina Deliss)	2023	—	—	—	Non-album singles
"Lego"	2023	—	—	—	Non-album singles
"Tagil" (featuring Natalya Vishnyakova)	2024	—	—	—	Non-album singles
"Dlya tebya"	2024	—	—	—	Non-album singles
"Zerkala (Luchami, ognyami)"	2024	—	—	—	Kameo
"Lyubov ne prokhodit"	2024	—	—	—	Non-album single
"Trogatelno"	2024	—	—	—	Kameo
"Kak nayti lyubov"	2024	—	—	—	Non-album singles
"Dozhd ledyanoy"	2024	—	—	—	Non-album singles
"Ty moya zhizn" (featuring Sergey Korotkov)	2024	—	—	—	Non-album singles
"Vstrecha v puti"	2024	—	—	—	Non-album singles
"Pogovori so mnoyu, noch"	2024	—	—	—	Non-album singles
"Rano govorit"	2024	—	—	—	Non-album singles
"Lyubimyye glaza" (featuring Alexey Mayer)	2024	—	—	—	Non-album singles
"Slova lyubvi" (featuring Dobrovolsky)	2024	—	—	—	Non-album singles
"Serdtse – tocny indikator"	2024	—	—	—	Non-album singles
"V nashem puti"	2024	—	—	—	Pripomnim yunost
"Moy lyubimy muzhchina"	2024	—	—	—	Non-album singles
"Mama moya milaya"	2024	75	47	—	Non-album singles
"Tam, gde ostalis my" (featuring Oleg Popkov)	2024	—	—	—	Non-album singles
"Zapisnaya knizhka"	2024	—	—	—	Non-album singles
"Privet" (featuring Gena Seleznyov)	2024	—	—	—	Non-album singles
"Khochu byt s toboy"	2024	—	—	—	Kameo
"My s toboy"	2024	—	—	—	Non-album singles
"Neuzheli"	2024	—	—	—	Non-album singles
"Pripomnim yunost"	2024	—	—	—	Pripomnim yunost
"Tayna ulybki"	2024	—	—	—	Non-album singles
"Belyy lebyad nad polesyem"	2024	—	—	—	Non-album singles
"Odinokoye serdtse"	2024	—	—	—	Non-album singles
"Osen"	2024	—	—	—	Non-album singles
"Volshebnaya strana"	2024	—	—	—	Non-album singles
"Tolko s nim"	2024	—	—	—	Non-album singles
"Zaberu v svoy plen"	2024	—	—	—	Non-album singles
"Vmeste v Novy god"	2024	—	—	—	Non-album singles
"Era Vodoleya"	2024	—	—	—	Non-album singles
"Ya v etom mire rstsvela"	2024	—	—	—	Non-album singles
"Spasibo, Bozhe"	2024	—	—	—	Non-album singles
"—" denotes items which did not chart in that country.

== Music videos ==
Title	Year	Director(s)
"Ne plach"	1991	Andrey Bazanov
"Kak zhal"	1992	Oleg Gusev
"Sineye more"	1993	Unknown
"Tolko ty"	1994	Vladimir Shevelkov
"Plachu"	1994	Svetlana Barkhatova
"Yasny moy svet"	1996	Vladimir Shevelkov
"Moy Nenaglyadny"	1997	Vladimir Shevelkov
"Korostel"	1997	Boris Dedenev
"Vot i solntse selo"	1997	Vladimir Shevelkov
"Sterpitsya – slyubitsya"	1997	Boris Dedenev
"Ledyanoye serdtse"	1998	Vladimir Shevelkov
"Veter pel"	1999	Aleksandr Solokha
"Myortvyye tsvety"	1999	Aleksandr Solokha
"Moy son"	2000	Aleksandr Igudin
"Leto – zima"	2000	Aleksandr Igudin
"Leto – zima (Latrack Extasy Techno Mix)"	2000	Aleksandr Igudin
"Tebya lyublyu"	2001	Aleksandr Igudin
"Zolotaya pora"	2001	Aleksandr Igudin
"Ty ne lyubi ego"	2001	Aleksandr Igudin
"Da – eto net"	2002	Tatiana Bulanova
"Prosto veter" (featuring Pavel Sokolov)	2002	V. Udaltsov
"Pozvoni"	2003	Valery Khattin
"Lyubila tolko tebya"	2003	Viktor Bondaryuk
"Vot takiye dela"	2003	Aleksandr Igudin
"Belaya cheryomukha"	2004	Aleksandr Igudin
"Angel"	2004	Valery Khattin
"Oseni v glaza"	2004	Aleksandr Smirnov
"Letela dusha"	2005	Aleksandr Smirnov
"Lyublyu i skuchayu"	2006	Natalya Adrianova
"Tsvetok" (featuring Sergey Lyubavin)	2010	Yevgeny Kuritsyn
"Ranennye ptitsy" (featuring Sergey Pereverzev)	2012	Sergey Pereverzev
"S etogo dnya" (featuring Konstantin Kostomarov)	2013	Lex Rusakoff
"Razvedeny mosty" (featuring Alexander Inshakov)	2013	Aleksandr Igudin
"Nikogda ne govori - nikoga" (featuring Alexander Lominsky)	2014	Studio "Drugiye"
"Detstvo"	2015	Oleg Gusev
"Ne boytes lyubvi"	2016	Oleg Gusev
"V dome, gde zhivyot moya pechal"	2018	Rustam Romanov
"Igrayu v pryatki na sudbu"	2019	Aleksandr Igudin
"Dve kapelki" (featuring Marina Tskhay)	2019	Igor Sorokin
"Yedinstvenny dom"	2020	Katya Ivanova
"Yekhidna" (featuring Elektroslabost)	2020	Unknown
"Tanya, dyshi"	2022	Igor Latyshko
"Molitva" (featuring Mekhdi Ibragimi Vafa)	2022	Aleksandr Gonopolsky
"Do svidaniya" (featuring Gonopolsky)	2022	Aleksandr Gonopolsky
"Ty moy kosmos"	2023	Igor Latyshko
