= Matthew Bauer =

American painter, sculptor and musician

- Origin: Youngstown, Ohio, United States
- Genres: Americana, electronic, experimental
- Occupations: Artist, composer, musician
- Instruments: Vocals, guitar, piano

Matthew Bauer is an American painter, sculptor and musician. He has released music under the alias of Mathieu Bauer, as of 2015, he has returned to the usage of his real name. His album Night Demons released on So French Records reached #3 on Beatport's top Indie Dance / Nu Disco releases.

His artwork has been used by other musicians for CDs and promotional art, including the German synthpop/futurepop band Seabound's single "Travelling" released on dependent, cover artwork for the grindcore act Malefaction, and a ThouShaltNot album sleeve.

He is the composer of the score to the animated film Baby Layne (2005). It received the Audience Award at Brooklyn's 2005 Kids Filmfest.

He currently resides in Los Angeles, California.

== Discography ==
=== LPs ===
- 2015 Night Demons

=== EPs ===
- 2005 "Malerhjerne" (EED)

==== Self released albums ====
- 2006 Embryonic
- 2007 Galore
- 2010 Animal Magnetism

=== Compilations ===
- 2005 Compilations 2005 (EED)
- 2015 So French Records Summer Compilation 5

=== Remixes ===
- 2006 Ascalaphe Remixed – Micro (EED)
- 2015 Steige – Telios (The Remixes)
