= Vitaly Kaloyev =

Russian architect (born 1956)

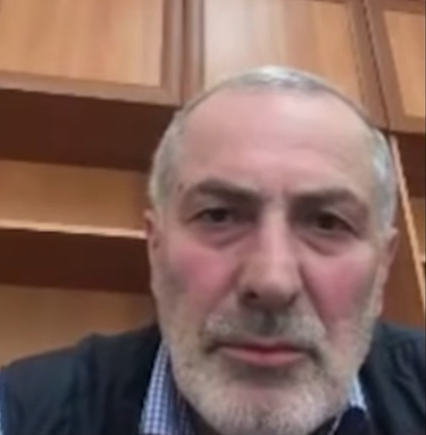
- Kaloyev in 2019
- Born: 15 January 1956 (age 70); Ordzhonikidze, North Ossetian ASSR, Soviet Union
- Occupations: Architect, deputy minister
- Known for: Murder of Peter Nielsen
- Criminal charges: Premeditated murder with malice aforethought, later reduced to without malice aforethought
- Criminal penalty: 8 years initially, sentence reduced to 5.25 years; roughly 3.5 years actually served
- Criminal status: Released in 2007 and returned to North Ossetia-Alania
- Spouses: Svetlana Kaloyeva (m. 1991; died 2002); Irina Dzarasova (m. 2012)
- Children: 4 (2 deceased)

Vitaly Konstantinovich Kaloyev (Russian: Виталий Константинович Калоев, IPA: [vʲɪˈtalʲɪj kənstɐnʲˈtʲinəvʲɪtɕ kɐˈlojɪf]; Iron Ossetic: Калоты Къостайы фырт Витали, romanized: Kaloty Qostaiy fyrt Vitali, IPA: [kɑloˈtə qostɑˈjə ˈfərt viˈtɑli]; born 15 January 1956) is a Russian former architect who was convicted of the premeditated murder of an air traffic controller after his family died aboard BAL Bashkirian Airlines Flight 2937, which collided with DHL International Aviation ME Flight 611 over Überlingen, Germany, on 1 July 2002.

Kaloyev held Peter Nielsen (16 August 1967 – 24 February 2004), the sole air traffic controller in Switzerland who was handling traffic the night of the collision, responsible. In 2004, Kaloyev travelled to the Swiss town of Kloten, where he killed Nielsen, who had since retired from his air traffic control job at Skyguide. After his release from prison, Kaloyev was appointed deputy minister of construction of North Ossetia–Alania. In 2016, upon retirement from the local Ossetian government, Kaloyev was awarded the highest regional medal by that government, the medal "To the Glory of Ossetia". The medal is awarded for the highest achievements, improving the living conditions of the inhabitants of the region, for educating the younger generation and maintaining law and order.

== Background ==
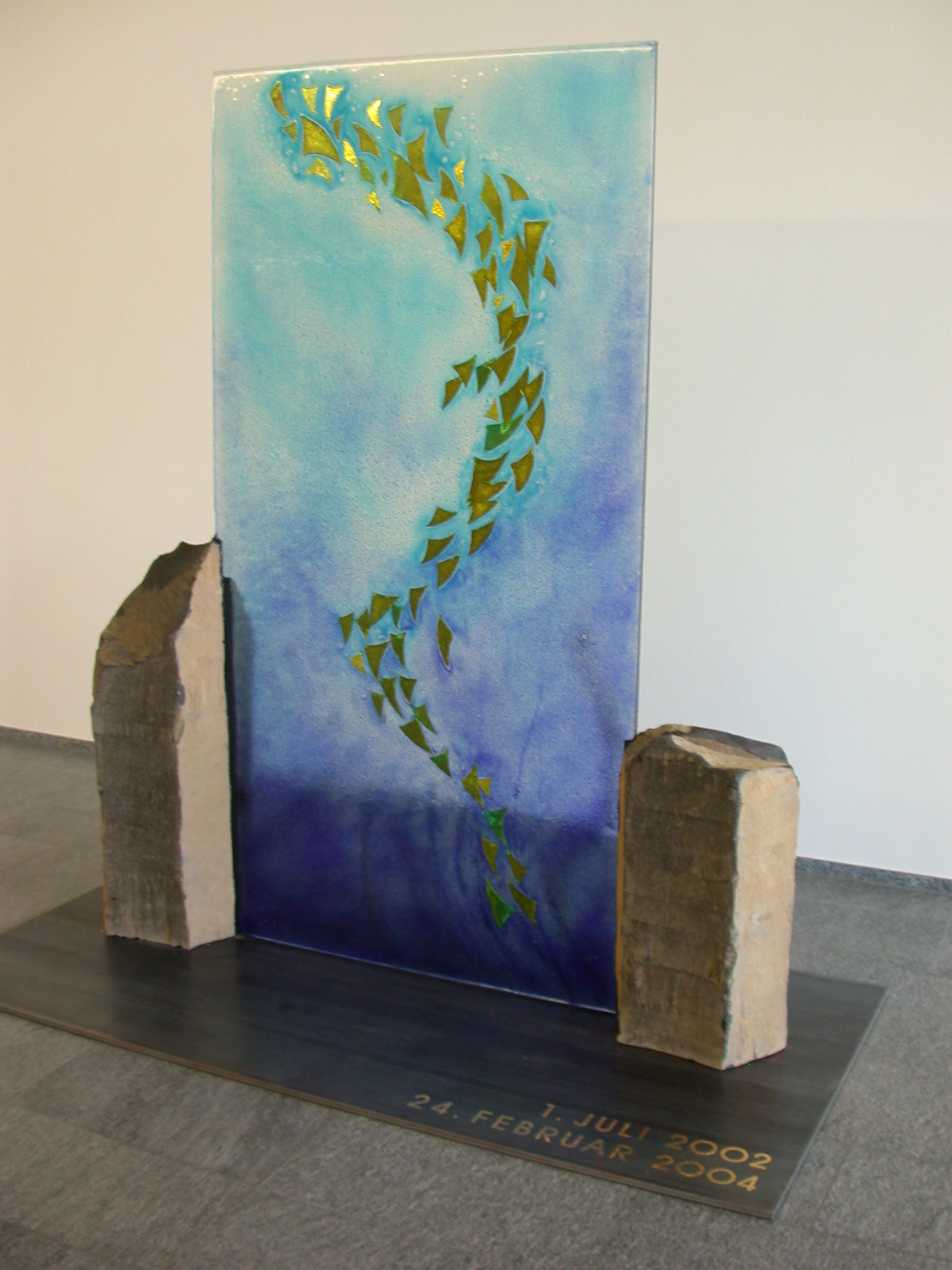
Skyguide memorial to the aviation accident and homicide of Peter Nielsen.

Vitaly Kaloyev had lost his wife Svetlana Kaloyeva (Russian: Светлана Калоева) and two children, 10-year-old Konstantin (Russian: Константин) and 4-year-old Diana (Russian: Диана) in the Überlingen mid-air collision in 2002.

Yuri Kaloyev, the brother of Vitaly, reported that he suffered a nervous breakdown following the loss of his family. Vitaly participated in the search for the bodies and located a broken pearl necklace owned by his daughter, Diana. He also found her body, which was intact, as some trees had broken her fall. Svetlana's body landed in a corn field, while Konstantin's body hit the asphalt in front of an Überlingen bus shelter.

Kaloyev spent the first year after the accident lingering at the graves of his family and building a shrine to them in his home. At the memorial service for the first anniversary of the tragedy, he asked the head of Skyguide about the possibility of meeting the controller who had been responsible for the disaster, but he received no response. Kaloyev then hired a Moscow private investigator to find Nielsen's address outside Zürich, before travelling to the former air traffic controller's home in Kloten.

=== Murder of Peter Nielsen ===
On the afternoon of 24 February 2004, Kaloyev set off for Nielsen's house. A neighbour spotted him and asked what he wanted. He waved a piece of paper with Nielsen's name on it. The neighbour pointed to Nielsen's front door, but instead of knocking, Kaloyev sat down in the garden.

Nielsen, originally from Denmark, had lived in Switzerland since 1995. He spotted Kaloyev, went outside and asked him what he wanted. His young children accompanied him into the garden as well, but his wife tried to call them back; she was still inside when she heard a "kind of scream". Nielsen was stabbed several times and died of his injuries a few minutes later in the presence of his wife and three children.

Answering questions from the judge, Kaloyev said the plane crash above Lake Constance had ended his life. He said his children were the youngest on board Flight 2937, so there was no need for him to identify the bodies. Kaloyev said he was crushed by the loss of his family: "I have been living in the cemetery for almost two years, sitting beside their graves". Kaloyev wanted Nielsen to apologize to him for the death of his family. Kaloyev offered no explanation for why he brought the weapon with him on a peaceful errand and initially denied the killing entirely.

=== Trial ===
On 26 October 2005, Kaloyev was convicted of the premeditated killing of Nielsen (a charge that falls between murder and manslaughter in Switzerland) and was sentenced to eight years in prison. In 2006, the Swiss Supreme Court reduced his sentence to five years and three months. In 2007, he was paroled by the court, but the prosecution appealed the decision.

On 23 August 2007, the court accepted the appeal, and Kaloyev remained in prison. On 8 November 2007, Kaloyev was released from prison on parole after having served only two-thirds of his sentence, a total of three and a half years.

=== Return ===
Returning to his home in North Ossetian city of Vladikavkaz, Kaloyev was met with enthusiastic crowds who cheered him as a hero. Members of the youth movement Nashi displayed a banner which read: "You are a real man" in Ossetian.

Vitaly Yusko, a member of a Russian organisation dedicated to helping the relatives of air crash victims, stated that "Kaloyev is a hero. Those guilty of causing air crashes often remain unpunished. Such a radical punishment is the only way to make them carry responsibility for their crimes". Many Russians appeared to share his sentiments, and believed that Kaloyev committed "a heroic deed avenging for the death of his family." The positive reaction and appointment in Russia were met with a negative reception in Switzerland.

I don't really take offense at people who call me a murderer. People who say that would betray their own children, their own motherland… I protected the honor of my children and the memory of my children.

He's nobody to me. He's nobody to me. He was an idiot and that's why he paid for it with his life. If he'd been smarter, it wouldn't have been like this. If he'd invited me into the house, the conversation would have happened in softer tones and the tragedy might not have happened.

— Vitaly Kaloyev

The Swiss government asked Kaloyev to repay the costs of his imprisonment, about US$157,000. Kaloyev has refused to do so. When Kaloyev travelled to Germany to attend the 10th-anniversary memorial, he was detained by German authorities, saying that he was on a Swiss watch list. Russian consular authorities protested the detainment. The Germans released Kaloyev after Russian diplomats agreed to accompany him.

In his native North Ossetia, Kaloyev was appointed Deputy Minister of Construction of the Republic. He held this post until 15 January 2016, when he retired, receiving the highest state award by the local government, the medal "To the Glory of Ossetia", on his 60th birthday. The medal was awarded for the highest achievements, improving the living conditions of the inhabitants of the region, for educating the younger generation and maintaining law and order.

Kaloyev remarried more than a decade after the air tragedy, in approximately 2012 or 2013, to a woman named Irina Dzarasova, who was an engineer at OAO Sevkavkazenergo. On 25 December 2018, Irina gave birth to twins: a boy and girl.

A petition was filed to the government of North Ossetia–Alania on 15 June 2015 to dismiss Kaloyev from his position of deputy minister because it damages relationships of Russia with other countries. The petition was reproduced in a 2016 article published in the Journal of Defense Management.

== In media ==
Beside his portrayal in news reports, Kaloyev has been portrayed in many forms of media in the years after the Überlingen mid-air collision.

Films

- The crash and the subsequent killing of the ATC were used as the basis of a film produced by German and Swiss TV stations SWR and SF, called Flug in die Nacht – Das Unglück von Überlingen (Flight into the Night – the Accident at Überlingen) (2009), starring Ken Duken as Nielsen and Evgeni Sitochin as Kaloyev.
- The U.S. film Aftermath (2017) is loosely based on the Überlingen midair collision, starring Arnold Schwarzenegger as a character largely based on Kaloyev.
- The Russian film Unforgiven (2018) is based on the Überlingen midair collision, with Dmitry Nagiyev portraying Kaloyev.

Music

- "Ballad of Vitaly", the closing track on the U.S. rock band Delta Spirit's album History from Below (2010), recounts the story of the midair collision and Vitaly Kaloyev's actions following the crash.
- The German EBM/futurepop band Edge of Dawn alludes to Kaloyev's story and mentions his name in the song "The Flight (Lux)", which appears on their EP The Flight (2005) and their full-length album Enjoy the Fall (2007).

Podcasts

- On 3 and 10 February 2019, Casefile True Crime Podcast: "Peter Nielsen", Case 106 (Parts 1 and 2) covered the story of the mid-air collision and subsequent killing of the former Skyguide controller Peter Nielsen, by Kaloyev.
- On 12 January 2021, the Hard Landings podcast covered the story in Episode 64: The Überlingen Mid-air Collision.
- On 5 May 2022, Black Box Down covered the events of the Überlingen mid-air collision and the following murder of Peter Nielsen by Kaloyev.
- On 31 March 2023, Cautionary Tales with Tim Harford podcast covered the story in "Cautionary Tales – The Vigilante and the Air Traffic Controller".

Television

- The collision featured in multiple segments of the Canadian TV series Mayday:
  - "Deadly Crossroads", a season-two (2004) episode of Mayday (called Air Emergency and Air Disasters in the U.S. and Air Crash Investigation in the UK and elsewhere around the world). The dramatisation was broadcast with the title "Mid-Air Collision" in the original United States airing, United Kingdom, Australia, and Asia. Kaloyev was played by actor Kresimir Bosiljevac.
  - The flight was also included in a Mayday season-eight (2009) Science of Disaster special titled "System Breakdown", which looked at the role of air traffic controllers in aviation disasters.
  - The flight was featured again in the season-twenty-five episode"Collision Catastrophe".
- The National Geographic Channel documentary series Seconds From Disaster featured this midair collision in the episode entitled "Collision at 35,000 feet", released on 26 September 2011. Kaloyev was interviewed in this episode.

Theatre

In the U.S. off-Broadway play, My Eyes Went Dark, which opened 7 June 2017 and closed 2 July, playwright and director Matthew Wilkinson tells Kaloyev's story, which featured, among other characters, Declan Conlon as Kaloyev and Thusitha Jayasundera as his wife. It played at 59E59 Theaters in New York City.
