= Frank Spinath =

German psychologist and musician (born 1969)

Frank Michael Spinath (born 1969) is a German psychologist and musician. He is a professor of psychology at Saarland University, known for his research in the field of differential psychology. As a musician, he is known as the vocalist of the electronic duo Seabound and the German futurepop band Edge of Dawn.

== Education and academic career ==
Born in Wipperfürth, Germany, Spinath earned his diploma, Ph.D., and habilitation degrees in psychology from Bielefeld University in 1995, 1999, and 2003, respectively. He became a full professor of psychology at Saarland University in 2004.

== Musical career ==
Spinath was introduced to fellow German Martin Vorbrodt in 1995 by a mutual friend; the two soon began collaborating. The duo perform and record as Seabound. After signing with Dependent Records, Seabound released their debut album No Sleep Demon in 2001.
