= Aftermath (2017 film) =

2017 film by Elliott Lester

- Theatrical release poster
- Directed by: Elliott Lester
- Written by: Javier Gullón
- Produced by: Scott Franklin; Randall Emmett; Eric Watson; George Furla; Peter Dealbert; Arnold Schwarzenegger; Darren Aronofsky
- Starring: Arnold Schwarzenegger; Scoot McNairy; Maggie Grace; Martin Donovan
- Cinematography: Pieter Vermeer
- Edited by: Nicholas Wayman-Harris
- Music by: Mark Todd
- Production companies: Emmett/Furla/Oasis Films; Pacific View Management; Protozoa Pictures; Grindstone Entertainment Group
- Distributed by: Lionsgate Premiere
- Release date: April 7, 2017
- Running time: 92 minutes
- Country: United States
- Language: English
- Budget: $10.5 million
- Box office: $817,874

Aftermath is a 2017 American thriller film directed by Elliott Lester and written by Javier Gullón. The film, starring Arnold Schwarzenegger, Scoot McNairy, Maggie Grace, and Martin Donovan, was released on April 7, 2017, by Lionsgate Premiere. It is based on events and people surrounding the 2002 Überlingen mid-air collision of a passenger airliner with a cargo jet, although the names, places, nationalities, and incidents were changed. It was released on video on demand.

== Plot ==
Roman Melnyk, a construction worker, is allowed to leave work early to prepare for the arrival of his wife Olena and pregnant daughter Nadiya from New York City, aboard flight AX 112. At the airport to welcome his family, Roman receives the news that AX 112, with his wife and daughter on board, had been in an accident. Roman is devastated and blames the air traffic controller for the deaths of his family.

Meanwhile, Jacob "Jake" Bonanos, an air traffic controller, is happily married to Christina with whom he has a young son named Samuel. Jake is on duty the night of the crash, which occurs when his colleague is on coffee break, forcing Jake to do both their jobs, and the telephone lines needed to communicate with other airports are briefly down while under maintenance. He is devastated after seeing AX 112 and the other flight, DH 616, disappear from the radar, knowing the two planes collided and were destroyed. Although the investigators cannot hold Jake responsible for the crash and the passengers' deaths, he blames himself; as time passes, he slowly unravels, straining the relationship with his family, and is unwilling to discuss what happened.

It is reported that all 271 passengers and crew were killed in the mid-air collision. Roman goes to the crash site and, posing as a volunteer with no relationship with the victims, recovers his daughter's necklace and the bodies of his wife and daughter. At home Roman stays hidden inside, when Tessa Gorbett, a journalist, approaches, expressing interest in writing a book on the incident. She ends up leaving behind some prior articles of plane disasters she had written about (to show her fidelity to accuracy and objectivity) through the mail slot of the door.

Because of the seriousness of the incident, his company's lawyer advises Jake to move to another state and adopt a new name for his and his family's safety. Roman meets lawyers John and James Gullick, who unsuccessfully try to convince him to sign an agreement stating that the airline will pay his expenses for medical and mental healthcare, plus $85,000 and $75,000 in damages for the loss of his wife and daughter respectively. Roman refuses to sign it, as neither the company nor the lawyers will express apologies for the loss of his family.

One year later, Roman and other crash victims' relatives attend the inauguration of a newly completed memorial at the crash site. Jake, having moved to another state, now works at a travel agency, under the name "Pat Dealbert", and lives alone. Roman has also moved to another town and now works as a carpenter.

Roman meets Tessa and asks her, as a favor, to find Jake. Tessa later reveals Jake's cover name and occupation, but she initially refuses to give his address. Roman later tracks down the building where Jake is working and follows him to his apartment. There, after waiting a day, on a day when Christina and Samuel happen to be visiting Jake for the weekend, Roman confronts him at his door. Jake tells him it was an accident without apologizing, so Roman stabs him in the torso and neck. Jake falls to the floor and bleeds to death, while Christina and Samuel sob and Roman deliriously sits down next to them on the couch.

Roman is convicted of murder and serves 10 years of his prison term, then is released early on parole, given the extenuating circumstances that motivated his crime. While visiting his family's grave, he meets a stranger. The young man turns out to be Samuel, who has tracked Roman down with the intention of killing him to avenge his father's murder. However, Roman apologizes, and Samuel, overcome with emotion, realizes he cannot go through with the execution because it's not what he was taught. He allows Roman to leave. Roman walks away alive, but now must spend the rest of his life dealing with the aftermath of his crime.

== Cast ==
- Arnold Schwarzenegger as Roman Melnyk (based on Vitaly Kaloyev)
- Scoot McNairy as Jacob "Jake" Bonanos (based on Peter Nielsen)
- Maggie Grace as Christina
- Judah Nelson as Samuel
- Glenn Morshower as Matt
- Hannah Ware as Tessa
- Mo McRae as Saab
- Martin Donovan as Robert
- Larry Sullivan as James Gullick
- Mariana Klaveno as Eve
- Kevin Zegers as John Gullick
- Lewis Pullman as Older Samuel
- Teri Clark Linden as Airline Supervisor
- Joy Elizabeth Corrigan as Shelly

== Production ==
On June 23, 2015, it was announced that Arnold Schwarzenegger would star in Javier Gullón's action drama script 478, which would be produced by Darren Aronofsky's Protozoa Pictures.

On November 4, 2015, Emmett/Furla/Oasis Films (EFOF) came on board to finance and produce the film along with Protozoa, which Elliott Lester would direct. Lionsgate Premiere would release the film domestically, which would be produced by Protozoa's Aronofsky, Scott Franklin, and Eric Watson, and EFOF's Randall Emmett and George Furla, along with Peter Dealbert.

In November 2015, Highland Film Group sold the film to different international distributors at the American Film Market. On December 24, 2015, Mariana Klaveno was cast in the film to play Eve Sanders, an airline representative who breaks the news to Roman (played by Schwarzenegger) of his tragic loss.

Principal photography on the film began on December 14, 2015, in Columbus, Ohio, previously scheduled to begin on December 6. The film was expected to wrap up in mid-January 2016.

== Release ==
=== Theatrical ===
The film was released on April 7, 2017.

== Reception ==
=== Critical response ===
As of May 2025, the film holds a 40% approval rating on the review aggregator Rotten Tomatoes, based on 57 reviews with an average score of 5.2/10. On Metacritic the film has a score of 44 out of 100, based on 13 critics, indicating "mixed or average" reviews.

=== Reaction from Vitaly Kaloyev ===
Vitaly Kaloyev, upon whose recollection of the actual events the film is based, criticised the film because of some "distortions". According to Kaloyev, he, unlike the main character of the film, did not seek anyone's pity or apology, but only wanted to achieve justice. Additionally, he stated that the real air traffic controller, Nielsen, unlike the air traffic controller portrayed in the film, showed no signs of remorse, but on the contrary behaved with arrogance and contempt.

== See also ==
- Unforgiven (2018 film)
- Arnold Schwarzenegger filmography
- List of American films of 2017
