= Teri Clark Linden =

American actress

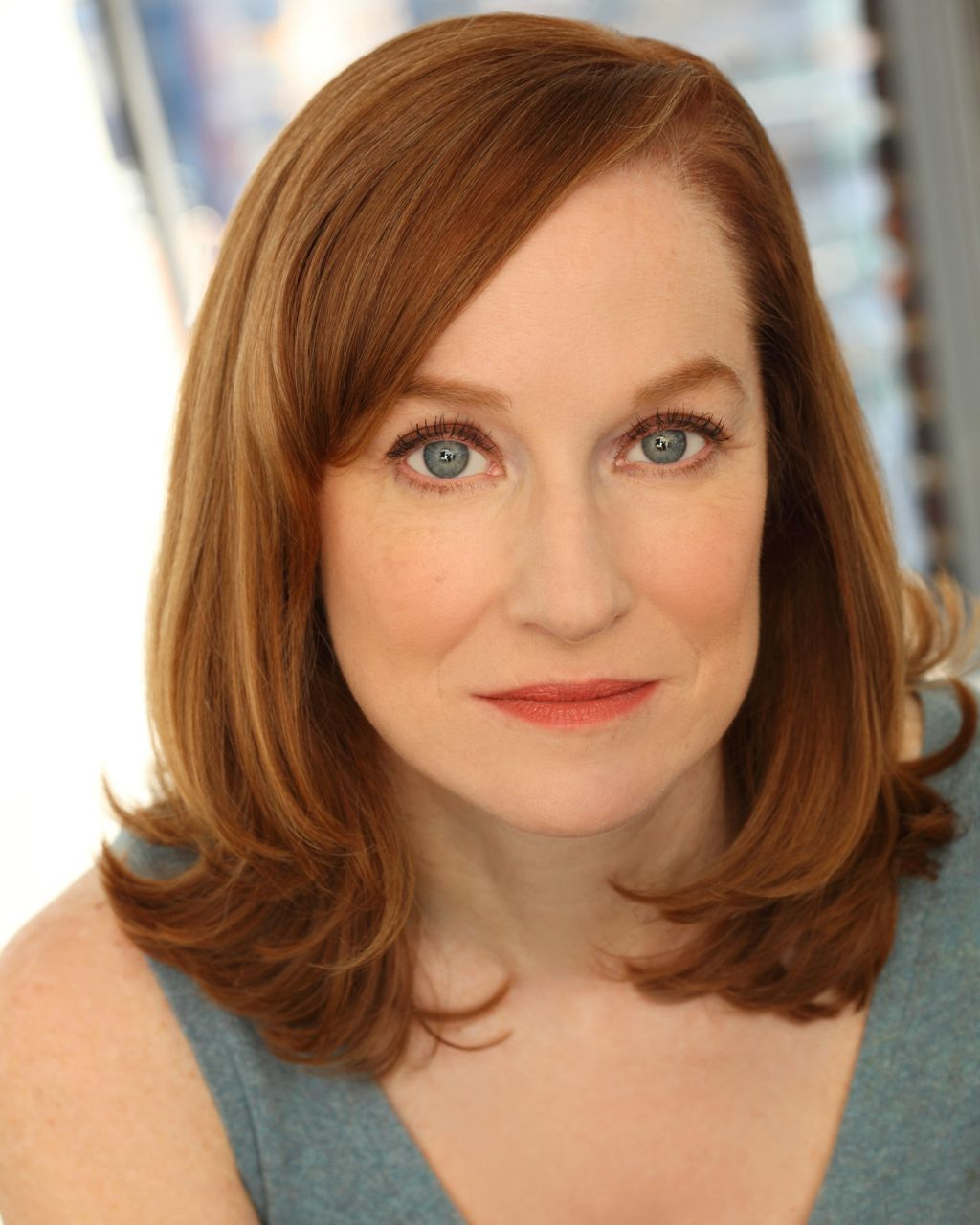
Teri Clark Linden in 2015

Teri Clark Linden is an American actress, best known for her film roles in Super 8, Jack Reacher and Love & Other Drugs.

== Early life and education ==
Clark Linden was born in Dayton, Ohio. She earned a Bachelor of Arts degree in theater from Roosevelt University.

== Career ==
From 2003 to 2004, Clark Linden appeared in five plays at actor Jeff Daniels's Purple Rose Theatre in Chelsea, Michigan, including the world premiere of Tim Clue's Leaving Iowa and Mitch Albom's Duck Hunter Shoots Angel. In 2007, she co-starred on stage with Laverne & Shirley's Cindy Williams and Eddie Mekka in the comedy Kong's Night Out. Clark Linden has narrated over 100 audiobooks for Audible.com and Brilliance Audio, mainly recorded from her home studio.

== Filmography ==
=== Film ===
Year	Title	Role	Notes
1993	Watch It	Party Guest	Uncredited
2004	Barn Red	Townsperson	Uncredited
2007	Nevermore	Doctor	
2008	Ocean of Pearls	Nurse Receptionist	
2008	Frozen Stupid	Bar Patron	Uncredited
2010	Mooz-lum	Nurse 1	
2010	Love & Other Drugs	ER Receptionist	
2011	Super 8	Mrs. Babbit	
2012	Won't Back Down	Cody's Teacher	
2012	Jack Reacher	Night Manager	
2014	Consideration	Loan Representative	
2016	A Watched Pot	Diner Waitress	
2017	Aftermath	Airline Supervisor	
2019	I See You	Mrs. Braun	
2019	Dark Waters	Neurologist	
2020	Frozen Stupid 2: Open Water	Renee	
2021	She Watches from the Woods	Sandra Smith	

=== Television ===
Year	Title	Role	Notes
1993	The Untouchables	Prostitute	Episode: "Pagano's Folly"
2018	Gone	Brenda Moran	Episode: "Secuestrado"
2022	Archive 81	Nurse	Episode: "What Lies Beneath"
