= Okna (TV series) =

Russian television tabloid talk show

- Окна
- Genre: Tabloid talk show
- Written by: Valery Komissarov
- Presented by: Dmitry Nagiev
- Country of origin: Russia
- Original language: Russian
- No. of seasons: 4
- No. of episodes: 814

Production
- Production locations: Moscow, Russia
- Camera setup: Multiple-camera setup
- Production company: Moya Semya Corporation

Original release
- Network: STS (Russia, 2002); TNT (Russia, 2002–2005); Novyi Kanal (Ukraine, 2002—2005); TET (Ukraine, 2006—2010); ONT (Belarus); KTK (Kazakhstan); TV5 (Latvia)
- Release: 2002 – 2005

Okna (Russian Окна - The Windows in English) was a Russian television tabloid talk show, hosted by Dmitry Nagiyev. Okna is ostensibly a talk show where troubled or dysfunctional families come to discuss their problems before a studio audience so that the audience or host can offer suggestions on what can be done to resolve their situations. There were lots of fighting and offensive language in show.

The show has become very popular on Russian television. It received attention in the UK after a fight was televised on Tarrant On TV, which has also led to its popularity growing on the internet via YouTube.
