= Unforgiven (2018 film) =

2018 Russian drama film directed by Sarik Andreasyan

- Poster
- Directed by: Sarik Andreasyan
- Written by: Aleksay Gravitsky; Sergei Volkov; Sarik Andreasyan
- Produced by: Sarik Andreasyan
- Starring: Dmitry Nagiev; Roza Khairullina; Mikhail Gorevoy
- Cinematography: Murad Abdel Fatah
- Edited by: Georgiy Isaakian
- Music by: Artyom Mikhaikin
- Production company: Big Cinema Home
- Distributed by: Karoprokat; Channel One Russia
- Release date: 27 September 2018
- Running time: 110 minutes
- Country: Russia
- Language: Russian
- Budget: $1.3 million (₽82.5 million)
- Box office: $6.1 million (₽393.3 million)

Unforgiven (Russian: Непрощённый, romanized: Neproshchennyy) is a Russian biographical drama film directed by Sarik Andreasyan with Dmitry Nagiyev starring as Vitaly Kaloyev. It was released on September 27, 2018.

The film is based on the 2002 Überlingen mid-air collision.

== Plot ==
Vitaly Kaloyev is an architect-engineer in Moscow, Russia. He refuses to pass the acceptance certificate for a newly finished apartment building, explaining that safety rules were violated, and its better for the construction company to face the fine and fix all potentially dangerous defects, than to put people lives at risk.

Kaloyev lives in a big house with his wife Svetlana and their two children Konstantin and Diana. As he returns home, they spend the evening together and after putting the kids to bed, Vitaly tells Svetlana that he has been offered to do a project in Barcelona. Vitaly is ready to leave for Barcelona and says goodbye to his family. Before he leaves, he gives Konstantin new chess pieces and Diana a pearl necklace. His brother Yuri drives him to the airport.

One year later, Vitaly asks Svetlana and the children to come for a holiday in Spain and she agrees. She and the children manage to purchase tickets on a flight that is leaving in a moment and make it just in time. Their journey begins, along with several schoolchildren. Vitaly waits for his family at Barcelona El Prat International Airport, but as he waits, it is revealed that Vitaly's family's flight Bashkirian Airlines Flight 2937 had collided in the air with a DHL plane just over the skies of the German city of Überlingen. Peter Nielsen, a controller at Skyguide, had been working two different screens at the same time and he had to switch from one to another while his colleague went on a rest break.

Vitaly gets a ticket at the airport and flies off to Überlingen. He soon arrives at the crash site, where rescue workers are working. After an officer hands him a security jacket and marking flags, Vitaly goes off to search and finds Diana and Svetlana's bodies.

A month later, Vitaly returns to Moscow and is unable to go into his house, but Yuri helps him. Yuri, along with their sister, Zoya, have come to help Vitaly after the loss of his family. He is later at a cemetery in which his wife and children are buried and he lays flowers next to their grave. Vitaly keeps watching the news to find out what has happened and when he hears Peter Nielsen's name, Vitaly writes down his surname and decides to meet him. After consulting with Skyguide president Alain Rossier, Vitaly is denied to meet Peter and wants Skyguide to apologize. He is then offered a compensation, but he says he does not want any money, the only thing he wants is for the company to apologize for killing his family.

Having no luck and now obsessed with finding someone to blame for the deaths of his wife and children, Vitaly travels to Zürich and stays in a hotel. He manages to find Nielsen's house and when he finds him, he shows him a picture of his wife and children and orders him to apologize for killing them. Nielsen instead orders him to leave and pushes away Vitaly's picture to the ground. Enraged, Vitaly draws a Swiss knife and stabs Peter a few times, before leaving. Vitaly returns to his hotel room and cuts his beard, before being arrested by police. He is then taken to court where he says he did not want to kill Peter, but does not deny murdering him. Vitaly is then sent to prison.

Two years later, Vitaly is released from jail and returns to Moscow. The moment he arrives at the airport, he is then surrounded by many people and members of the press, all honoring him as a hero. He then visits his family's grave again, before returning home.

A year and a half later, he finds a small kitten outside his house which he takes and holds and looks up into the sky.

In the final credits, it was said that four SkyGuide employees were fined and sentenced to probation, that Kaloyev returned to the construction site, that he is now retired and still brings flowers to the grave of his family every day. During the end credits, fragments of video recordings of the real-life crash over Lake Constance on July 1, 2002 and an interview with the real Vitaly Kaloyev are shown.

== Cast ==
- Dmitry Nagiyev as Vitaly Kaloyev
- Marjan Avetisyan as Svetlana Kaloyeva, Vitaly's wife
- Artyom Shklyaev as Konstantin "Kostya" Kaloyev, Vitaly's son
- Karina Kagramanyan as Diana Kaloyeva, Vitaly's daughter
- Samvel Muzhikyan as Yuri Kaloyev, Vitaly's brother
- Roza Khairullina as Zoya Kaloyeva, Vitaly's sister
- Mikhail Gorevoy as Vladimir Savchuk
- Andrius Paulavicius as Peter Nielsen
- Irina Bezrukova as airport employee
- Vadim Tsallati
- Sebastian Sisak as Stanislas
- Michael Dzhanibekyan
- Lisaveta Sakhnova as journalist
- Pavel Savinov as Spaniard at the airport
- Olivier Sioux as Alain Rossier

== See also ==
- Aftermath (2017 film)
