= Dmitry Nagiyev =

Russian actor, TV presenter, radio host and singer (born 1967)

- Дмитрий Нагиев
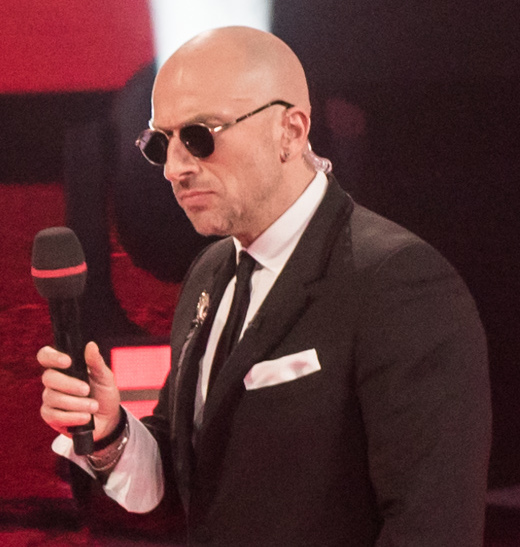
- Nagiyev on the show The Voice in 2018
- Born: Dmitry Vladimirovich Nagiyev; 4 April 1967 (age 59); Leningrad, RSFSR, USSR
- Occupations: Actor; TV presenter; radio host; singer
- Years active: 1990–present

Dmitry Vladimirovich Nagiyev (Russian: Дмитрий Владимирович Нагиев; born April 4, 1967) is a Russian actor, TV-host, musician, showman and radio host. In 1991, graduated from the Leningrad State Institute of Theatre, Music, and Cinema.

== Biography ==
Nagiyev was born in Leningrad, Russian SFSR, Soviet Union (now Saint Petersburg, Russia). In his young days, Dmitry Nagiyev has practiced Sambo, Judo (master of sports) under the leadership of Victor Gorlov and Arkady Rotenberg and gymnastics. He received the title of Junior Champion of the USSR Championships in the 1980s.

After school, he became a student at the Saint Petersburg Electrotechnical University (Faculty of Automation and Computer Engineering). While studying, he worked, then began was a part of black marketing. When he was arrested by law enforcement agencies with currency (in the Soviet times, illegal currency circulation was a criminal offense), then, in order to avoid criminal prosecution, he left for military service in the Soviet army. As an athlete he was sent to a sports company, but there was no sambo section, so Nagiyev went to serve in the air defense forces near Vologda.

After the army he entered the Russian State Institute of Performing Arts . He studied in the acting studio of Vladimir Petrov along with Igor Lifanov and Alexei Klimushkin. In September 1990, during a rehearsal of the graduation performance, Nagiyev had an attack, an ambulance urgently took him to the hospital, where doctors diagnosed facial paralysis; it took half a year to recover, but Nagiev’s “branded” squint remained for his whole life.

In April 2023, it was reported that Nagiyev had emigrated from Russia.

== Career ==
In 1991, after graduating from the institute, he worked in Saint Petersburg at the "Vremya" Theatre, then, was the anchor on "Modern" radio and four times was recognized as the country's best radio host. From 1993 to 2001, he performed songs and monologues in the program "Radio roulette" at the "Modern" radio to the music of Beethoven. He was the host of the beauty contests. In 1997, in the Saint Petersburg dance hall "Continent" he created an author's show, where he played contests, held theater lounges, as well as a comic auction with various artists.

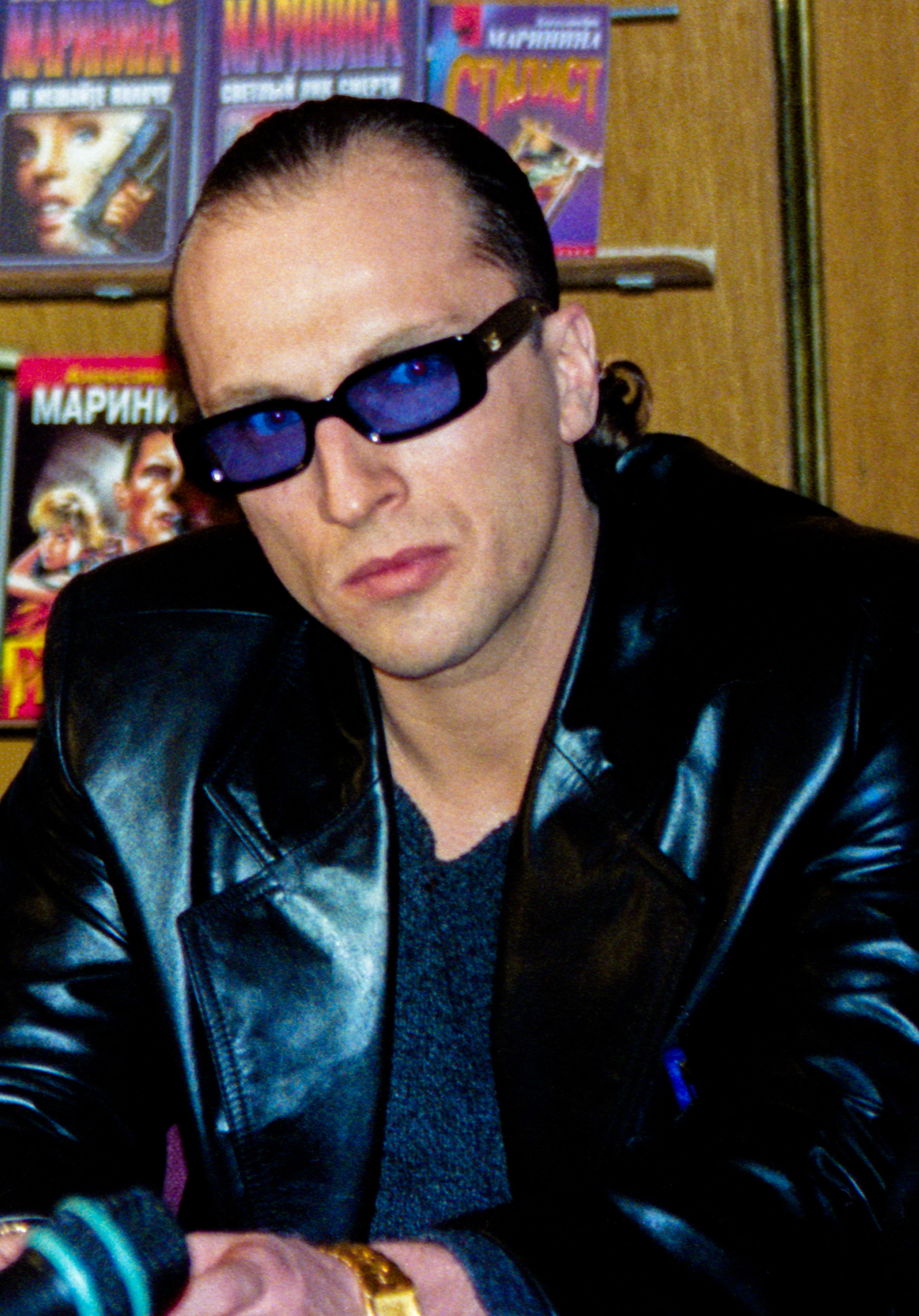
Nagiyev in 2000

From 1996 to 2004, he worked a lot in a duet with his Modern radio’s colleague, Sergey Rost: together they starred in the comedy sitcom "Look Out! Modern!" (Осторожно, модерн!), "Full Modern!" (Полный модерн! ), "Look Out! Modern! 2" (Осторожно, модерн! 2), were the hosts of the talk show "Once in the evening" (Однажды вечером) on STS and TNT, and in the early 2000s they wrote jokes for some KVN teams. Also in 1997, they starred in the film "Purgatory" (Чистилище) by Alexander Nevzorov, where Nagiyev played his first main role in the movie - the Chechen field commander Dukuz Israpilov.

After Rost’s leaving, he continued to act in the spin-offs "Beware, Zadov!" (Осторожно, Задов!) and "Zadov in Reality". From 2000 to 2008 he played in the detective sitcom Kamenskaya (TV series). From 2012 to 2016 he played the role of the owner of the Claude Monet restaurant in the sitcom Kitchen (Кухня). From 2013 to 2016 he starred in the series "Two Fathers, Two Sons" (Два отца и два сына). Since 2014, has been playing a major role in the television series "Fizruk".

He hosted the programs "Telecompact", "The Burden of Money", the talk show Okna, the final show of the project "Home" (Дом) on the TNT channel (2003). From 2005 to the present, Nagiyev is the host on Channel One Russia. In 2005-2014 he led the sports and entertainment show "Big Race" (Большие гонки). Since October 2012, he has hosted The Voice project, and since February 2014, The Voice Kids, and since September 2018 - the project The Voice Senior. Also in 2011, together with Natalya Andrejchenko and Stepan Urgant, he led the reality show "Mother in Act" on the Perets TV channel.

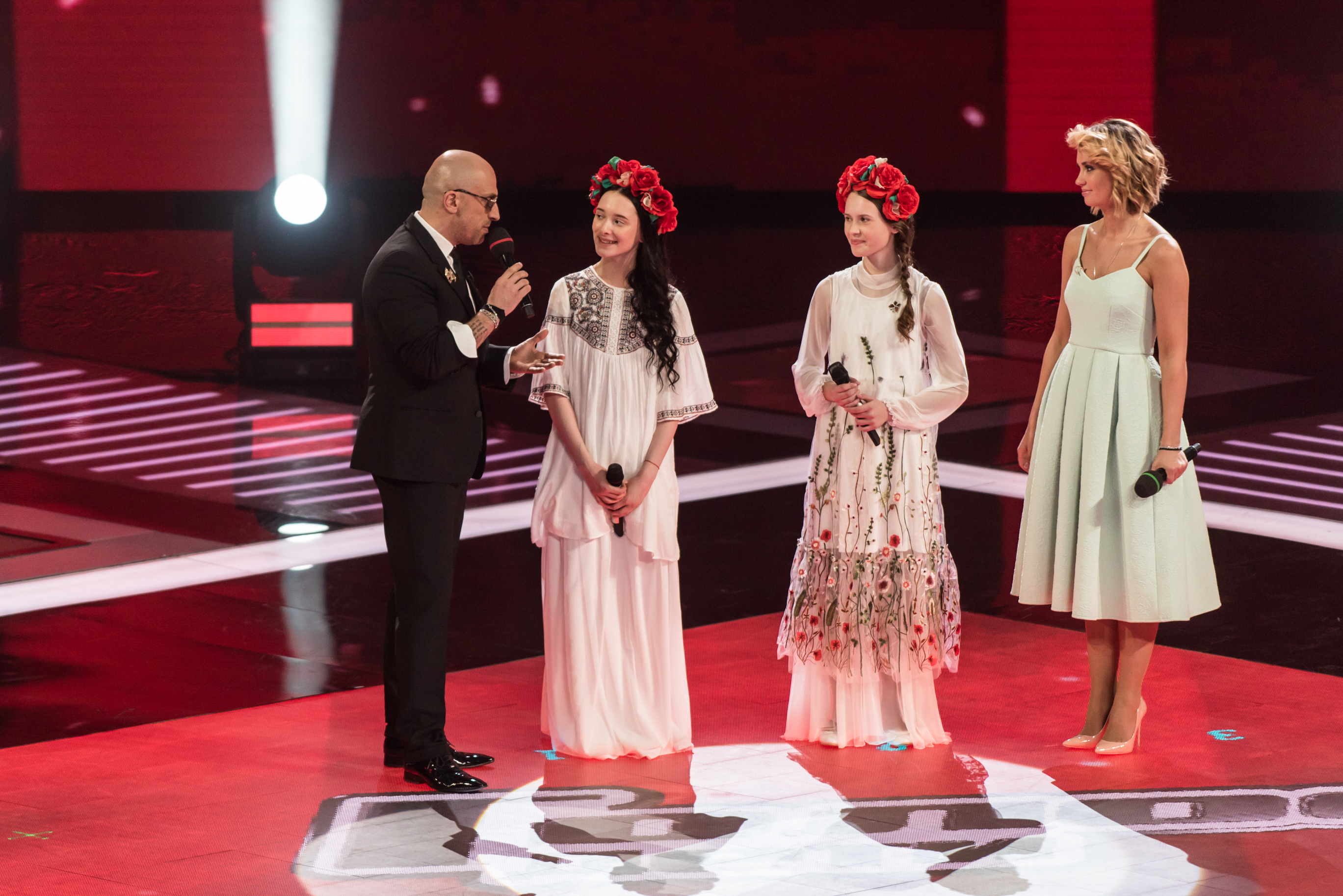
Nagiyev with TV-host Agata Muceniece and singer Eden Golan in April 2018

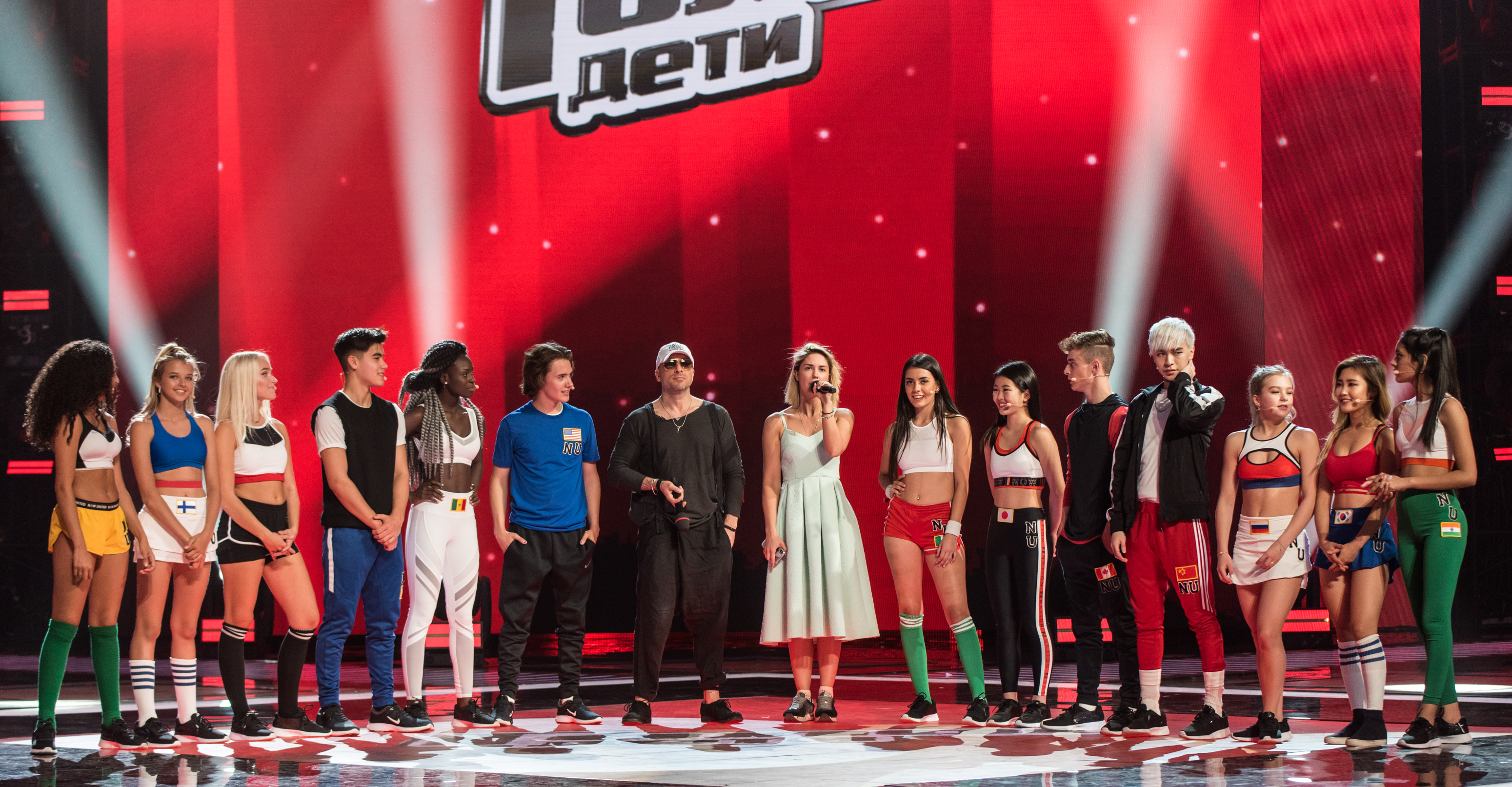
Nagiyev with the Now United on The Voice Kids Russia in 2018

In 2004, he wrote and performed the song "I Her Hoey" (Я её хой) with the group "Russkiy Razmer" and Professor Lebedinsky (a parody of the song "Dragostea Din Tei" by O-Zone), which lasted for several weeks in the top of the program"Golden Gramophone Award" on Russkoye Radio. Together with "Russkiy Razmer" and with Sergey Rogozhin, he recorded the song "My Butterfly".

In 2010 and 2011, with his ex-wife Alice Sher, he hosted the Peter FM radio award ceremony. From 2012 to 2016, he was the permanent host of the annual Golden Gramophone ceremony in a duet with Ivan Urgant. Since December 20, 2012, he became the new voice of the "Russkoye Radio Joke", replacing Vadim Galygin.

Since 2013, participates in the advertising campaign of the Russian mobile operator MTS. In 2014, he starred in an ad for the drug Miramistin. In 2015, he became the advertising person of "The Eurasia" restaurant chain in Saint Petersburg.

Often takes part in the jury of the High League of KVN. Starred in the movies, and voicing the cartoons.

In 2018, for the first time in 20 years, he played a dramatic role - Vitaly Kaloyev in the film Unforgiven by Sarik Andreasyan:

"When I received the script, the first question I asked Sarik was:"Are you sure that I am?" The cliches and roles are stuck, and short-sighted or not very brave directors are afraid to invite an artist with a comedy past"

In February 2023, he refused to host the Muz-TV awards, saying "The time will come when we will work to reward the truly best musicians."

=== Discography ===
- 1998: “Flight to Nowhere” (with Anna Samokhina and the Trubniy zov group)
- 2006: “Silver” (with the group "Razmer Project")

=== Shooting in clips ===
- "Your train is gone" with Elena Vilyuchinskaya (1998)
- Snowstorm with Elena Vasilyeva (2007)
- "My Moscow Love" with Arina and the group "Razmer Project" (2012)
- "Love will find you" with Polina Gagarina (2016)

=== Theatre ===
- "Cutie" is a musical based on the film Tootsie, directed by Lev Rakhlin - the main role
- "Kysya" (director Lev Rakhlin) - the main role - the cat Martyn, aka Kysya
- "Eroticon" (director Lev Rakhlin) - 6 characters
- "Territory" (plot - war in Chechnya) (director Rakhlin) - the main role

=== Filmography ===
- 1990: The Executioner
- 1995: Bullet to Beijing
- 1996 / 2001: Look Out! Modern!
- 1997: Purgatory
- 2000: Kamenskaya
- 2000: Nadezhda's House
- 2001: Mole
- 2002 / 2005: Okna
- 2002: The Destructive Power
- 2002: Mole 2
- 2002: Camera! Action!
- 2003: Kamenskaya 3
- 2003: Russian Special Forces
- 2003: The Game Without Rules
- 2003: Upside Down
- 2004: Russian Special Forces 2
- 2004: Yeralash
- 2005: Ali Baba
- 2005: Kamenskaya 4
- 2005: The Master and Margarita (TV)
- 2005: Hunting Wapiti
- 2005: The Fight Without Rules
- 2005: Balzac Age, Or All The Men Are Bastards
- 2005: The New Year Killer
- 2006: Weaknesses Of A Strong Woman
- 2006: Sonya The Golden Hand
- 2007: On The Way To The Heart
- 2007: Kilometer Zero
- 2007: Paradox
- 2007: The Fatal Likeness
- 2007: The Rock-Climber And The Last Of The 7th Lullaby
- 2008: The Return of the Musketeers, or The Treasures of Cardinal Mazarin
- 2008: The Best Movie
- 2008: Happy Together (TV)
- 2008: The Traffic Police etc.
- 2008: The Women's League
- 2009: The Simpletons: Episode One
- 2009: The Best Movie 2
- 2009: Katya
- 2009: The City Of Seductions
- 2009: The Last Wagon
- 2009: If Ifs And Ans Were Pots And Pans
- 2009: Savva Morozov
- 2009: The Russian Cross
- 2010: The Husband Of My Widow
- 2010: Robinzon The Woman
- 2010: The Frozen Despatches
- 2010: The Capital Of Sin
- 2011: Two Pistols
- 2011: To Run
- 2011: The Rules Of The Masquerade
- 2011: Mayakovsky. Two Days
- 2011: The International Airlines Pilot
- 2011: Kamenskaya 6
- 2012 / 2016: Kitchen (TV)
- 2012: The Jah's Territory
- 2012: The Guaranteed Male
- 2012: The Snow Queen
- 2013: What Men Up To
- 2013: The Courier From The Paradise
- 2013: The Polar Trip
- 2013 / 2016: Two Fathers, Two Sons (TV)
- 2014: The Shell-Shocked
- 2014 / 2017: The PE teacher
- 2014: The Kitchen in Paris
- 2015: The Cage
- 2015: Horoscope for good luck
- 2015: Only with the left hand
- 2015: The Very Best Day
- 2016: Smeshariki. The legend of the Golden dragon
- 2017: Kitchen. The Last Battle
- 2017: Yolki 6
- 2018: Unforgiven
- 2018: Yolki 7
- 2019 / 2020: Kitchen. War For The Hotel (TV)
- 2020: Save Kolya
- 2020: Goodbye America
- 2020: Nagiyev in quarantine
- 2021: Don't Heal Me
- 2021: Chikatilo
- 2021: BOOMERang
- 2022: Swingers
- 2022: Papy (Upcoming)
- 2022: Moy papa - vozhd (Upcoming)
- 2022: 12 Chairs (Upcoming)
- 2024: Grimsburg
- 2024: Yolki 11

== Personal life ==
External image
- Alice Sher with Kirill Nagiyev

- The ex-wife (from 1986 to 2010) - Alla Nagieva (nee Shchelischeva) (born June 18, 1966), is known as Alice Sher. Radio and television host, writer, journalist.
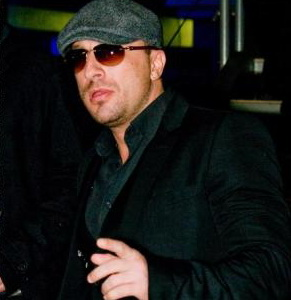
- Dmitry Nagiyev in 2009
  Son - Kirill Dmitrievich Nagiyev (born August 31, 1989), an actor at the theater and cinema, a TV host.

In 2022 - Actor and TV presenter Dmitry Nagiyev became a grandfather. He blurted this out in an interview, talking about his only son, Cyril. The showman noted that the heir does not really want to work with him on the frame.

– Now in the movie “The Hunter” he refused to play my son, he does not want parallels and the appearance of us together in the frame. Perhaps this is correct. I, as a dad, would be happy: once again my son is under supervision. And the son is already a father himself,” the artist told Caravan of Stories magazine.

Together with his older sister and her husband, they keep a stable near St. Petersburg, redeeming horses intended for slaughter.

He is a fan of the St. Petersburg Zenit.

In 2016, he became the richest Russian actor according to the Forbes magazine. His annual income amounted to $ 3.2 million.

He called himself “the sexual revolution leader”.

== Lineage ==
- Nagiyev in childhood with mom

- Nagiyev's paternal grandfather, Nikolai (Gulam) Nagiyev, after the First World War, fled from Iran to Ashgabat with his Arab parents. On the way, his parents died of starvation, and the boy ended up in a Turkmen orphanage, where he was given the name Nagiyev in honor of the people who brought him there (Turk. it means Savior of the world), and the new name Nikolai. He was fluent in Turkmen and Arabic, but spoke Russian, died of gangrene when Dmitry Nagiyev was nine years old. Dmitry often quotes his grandfather in his television programs and attributes to him funny quotes when he jokes.
- Gertruda Tsopke, Nagiyev's paternal grandmother, was a ballerina in the corps de ballet of the Bolshoi Theatre, after the wedding she moved to Ashgabat. She was half German, half Latvian. Her ancestors were from Baltic states and their first name were Leie and the Germans with the surname Tsopke; after the death of her husband she moved to her son in Leningrad.
- Father - Vladimir Nikolaevich Nagiyev, a failed actor: has lived in Ashgabat, he played in the Red Army theater by the age of 17, but he was not accepted into a theater institute. Subsequently, he worked at the Leningradskoye Optiko-Mekhanicheskoye Obyedinenie. In Leningrad, he met his first wife Lyudmila Zakharovna. After the divorce, he moved with his mother to a room on Yaroslavsky Prospekt.
- Maternal grandfather - the first secretary of the Petrograd district committee of the CPSU. During the Second World War he participated in the battle on the Nevsky Pyatachok, was wounded: a bullet ploughed through his chest and was only 3-4 centimeters from the heart, after being wounded he returned to the front. In his programs, Dmitry often mentions grandfather Zakhar, quoting his phrases (or attributing his own to him).
- Maternal grandmother - Lyudmila Ivanovna, sang in the Kirov Theatre.
- Mother - Lyudmila Zakharovna Nagiyeva (1938 - October 30, 2015) - philologist, teacher, assistant professor at the Department of Foreign Languages at the Military Academy of Communications (Saint Petersburg).
- The younger brother is Evgeny Vladimirovich Nagiyev (born July 1, 1971), an entrepreneur, the owner of a car wash and of a chain of mini-hotels, worked as a bodybuilding instructor, coached his older brother, starred in the TV sitcom "The Mole" (ru, Крот), is fond of racing, worked as a head of the security guard for a large night disco.
- Aunt - Nadezhda Zakharovna, sang in the Sandler’s choir.

Dmitry calls himself a “Russian Orthodox”.

== Social position ==
Dmitry Nagiyev - Chairman of the Board of the Dmitry Nagiyev Charitable Foundation "Anna".

In 1996, he headed the youth department of the election headquarters of the candidate for governor of St. Petersburg, Anatoly Sobchak, travelling around the city with him and the first deputy chairman of the government of St. Petersburg, Vladimir Putin, distributing buckwheat, stew and other products to the people.

According to Nagiyev, in Russia the ruling terms should be limited: "There is a written term, how many times you can go to power. So I don’t think that you need to go into power as much as you want".

Nagiyev condemns contemporaries who use the slogans "To Berlin" and "We can repeat" in their speech, offering to drag Russia into a war similar to the Great Patriotic War.

In April 2023, it was reported that Nagiyev emigrated to Turkey due to his disapproval of the Russian invasion of Ukraine.

== Books ==
- Alice Sher — "I was Nagiyev’s wife" ISBN 5-9524-1862-7
- Alice Sher — "How to never get married. Harmful advices to ex-wife of Dmitry Nagiyev" ISBN 5-9524-2014-1
