= Edge of Dawn =

- Origin: Germany
- Genre: futurepop
- Years active: 1998–present
- Labels: Dependent Records, Metropolis Records
- Members: Mario Schumacher, Frank M. Spinath
- Website: http://www.edgeofdawn.de/

Edge of Dawn is a German futurepop band consisting of Mario Schumacher and Frank M. Spinath (also a member of Seabound). Schumacher founded the band as a solo project in 1998. Spinath joined the project as vocalist in 2005. The duo's debut release, also in 2005, was the EP The Flight [Lux]. This was followed by two releases in 2007: the full-length Enjoy the Fall, which achieved the number three position on the German Alternative Chart in June 2007 and the EP Borderline Black Heart. Edge of Dawn's second studio album Anything That Gets You Through The Night was released May 21, 2010. In between releases, Edge of Dawn has contributed both original tracks and remixes to several Dependent compilations.

The name "Edge of Dawn" is an homage to the Covenant song with the same name.

== Discography ==
=== Studio albums ===
- Enjoy the Fall (2007) Metropolis Records
- Anything That Gets You Through The Night (2010) Metropolis Records

=== EPs ===
- The Flight (Lux) (2005) Metropolis Records
- Borderline Black Heart (2007) Metropolis Records
- Stage Fright (2010) Metropolis Records

=== Other releases ===
- Love Lost (2015) VA Dependence compilation
