= Russkiy Razmer =

Pop music group from Russia

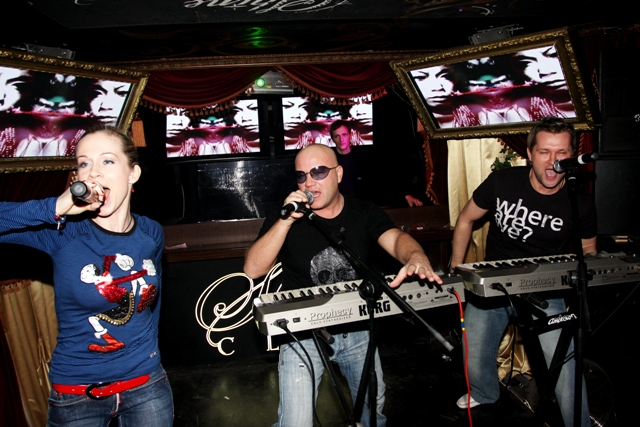

Background information
- Origin: Saint Petersburg, Russia
- Genres: Eurodance, synth-pop, techno
- Years active: 1991–present
- Members: Dmitriy Kopotilov; Igor Lutsenko; Eleonora Filimonova
- Past members: Viktor Bondaryuk; Yulia Kosheleva; Anzhelika Kuznetsova; Dmitry Khil; Alexander Turin
- Website: www.russki-razmer.spb.ru

Russkiy Razmer (Russian: Русский Размер, lit. Russian Size) is a Russian electronic dance band from Saint Petersburg.

== Origins ==
Russkiy Razmer was formed between 1991 and 1993 by Dmitry Kopotilov and Viktor Bondaryuk, two school friends originally from Kustanay, Kazakh SSR who moved to Saint Petersburg during the late 1980s independently of each other. Kopotilov was a small-business owner and Bondaryuk sold souvenirs. By that time both had played in different music bands. When Kopotilov met Bondaryuk in 1990, he suggested two songs for a new project. They started performing in rave clubs, and in 1992 they recorded several songs that later became part of their debut album: The Star Is Melting Above the Town, I'm Calling You Joy, Batman (Yu-A-Yu). Their first big concert took place in the Yubileyny Sports Palace in 1993 with various pop musicians taking part in it.

The first replicated album of Russkiy Razmer was recorded together with Vadim Volodin, a famous Russian sound-arranger and producer, in Moscow. Russkiy Razmer was an active participant in many TV music shows. The video for the song "Batman" (from the album Yu-A-Yu) reached respectable places on the top charts . During that time they actively performed as an opening band at the concerts of Army of Lovers, Haddaway, La Toya Jackson and other touring musicians. Their call "Davai-davai!" (simple translation of "C'mon-c'mon!") quickly became trendy in the Russian club culture.

In 1995 they met Alexander Levin, a TV and music producer. As the leading vocalist Angela (Anzhelika Kuznetsova) left the group to start a solo music career, Levin teamed Kopotilov and Bondaryuk with Alexey Lebedinsky, a parody singer and their old-time friend known by the stage name of Professor Lebedinsky. They regularly performed together from 1996 to 1998 and recorded two albums: Davay-Davay! in 1996 and Hello-Goodbye! in 1997. Their friend Dmitry Nagiyev, at the time a popular radio DJ and showman, also helped them with promotion.

The album We dance? was released in 1998 and reached U.S.A. and Europe. From then on Russkiy Razmer actively went on foreign tours, and during the period of 1997-2005 the group performed in the U.S.A. fifteen times. The song "Angel of the Day" (from the album 650) and the video of the song also reached the charts. Since 1999 Eleonora Filimonova has been the vocalist of the group. In the beginning of 2005 Igor Lutsenko joined the group, as a replacement for Viktor Bondaryuk, who had previously left.

== Discography ==
The first album of Russkiy Razmer, Ю-А-Ю (Yu-A-Yu), was recorded with a female vocalist, Анжела (Anzhelika Kuznetsova), and Вадим Володин (Vadim Volodin), who was the sound-arranger and producer of that time.

The next album Ля-Ля-Фа (La-La-Fa) was recorded with Профессор Лебединский (Professor Lebedinsky) and consisted mainly of rave cover-versions of all-time popular Russian songs. At the same time, the group was recording an alternative club album, Мяу (Meow). It had the alternate title Съешь таблетку, будь здоров! (Eat a Pill and be Healthy!). After a two-year hiatus the group released their fifth album in 1998, Танцуем? (We Dance?).

In 1999 the group released their album 650, which featured the female vocalist Настя (Nastya).

Before the next studio album, a collection of dance cover-versions of popular songs (mostly songs from famous Soviet films), Next, was issued. A year later, the album БумZ-БумZ (BumZ-BumZ) was released. The group then released the albums Выход - OUT (Exit - OUT), Меня колбасит (I Feel Groovy), and Восходящие воздушные потоки (Ascending Airflows). The last album with Viktor Bondaryuk was Цyzамен (Together, in German Zusammen). The new album !Слушай (!Listen) was released in 2010.

Original title	Transliterated Title	Translation	Year of release
Ю-А-Ю	Yu-A-Yu	Yu-A-Yu	1994
Ля-Ля-Фа	Lya-Lya-Fa	La-La-Fa	1995
Мяу	Myau	Meow	1996
Давай! Давай!	Davay! Davay!	Come On! Come On!	1996
Танцуем?	Tantsuyem?	Shall We Dance?	1998
650	650	650	1999
650.2	650.2	650.2	1999
БумZ-БумZ	BumZ-BumZ	BumZ-BumZ	2000
Next	Next	Next	2000
Лучшее	Luchsheye	The Best	2001
Выход - OUT	Vyhod - OUT	Exit - OUT	2001
Меня колбасит	Menya kolbasit	I Feel Groovy	2002
Восходящие воздушные потоки	Voskhodyashchiye vozdushnye potoki	Ascending Airflows	2003
The Best	The Best	The Best	2004
Цyzамен	Tsuzamen	Together/Zusammen	2004
!Слушай	!Slushai	!Listen	2010

== Literature ==
Alexander Alekseev, Andrei Burlaka (2001). Encyclopedia of Russian Pop and Rock Music. — Moscow: Eksmo-Press, p. 333. ISBN 5040066767
