= Seabound =

Electronic music duo

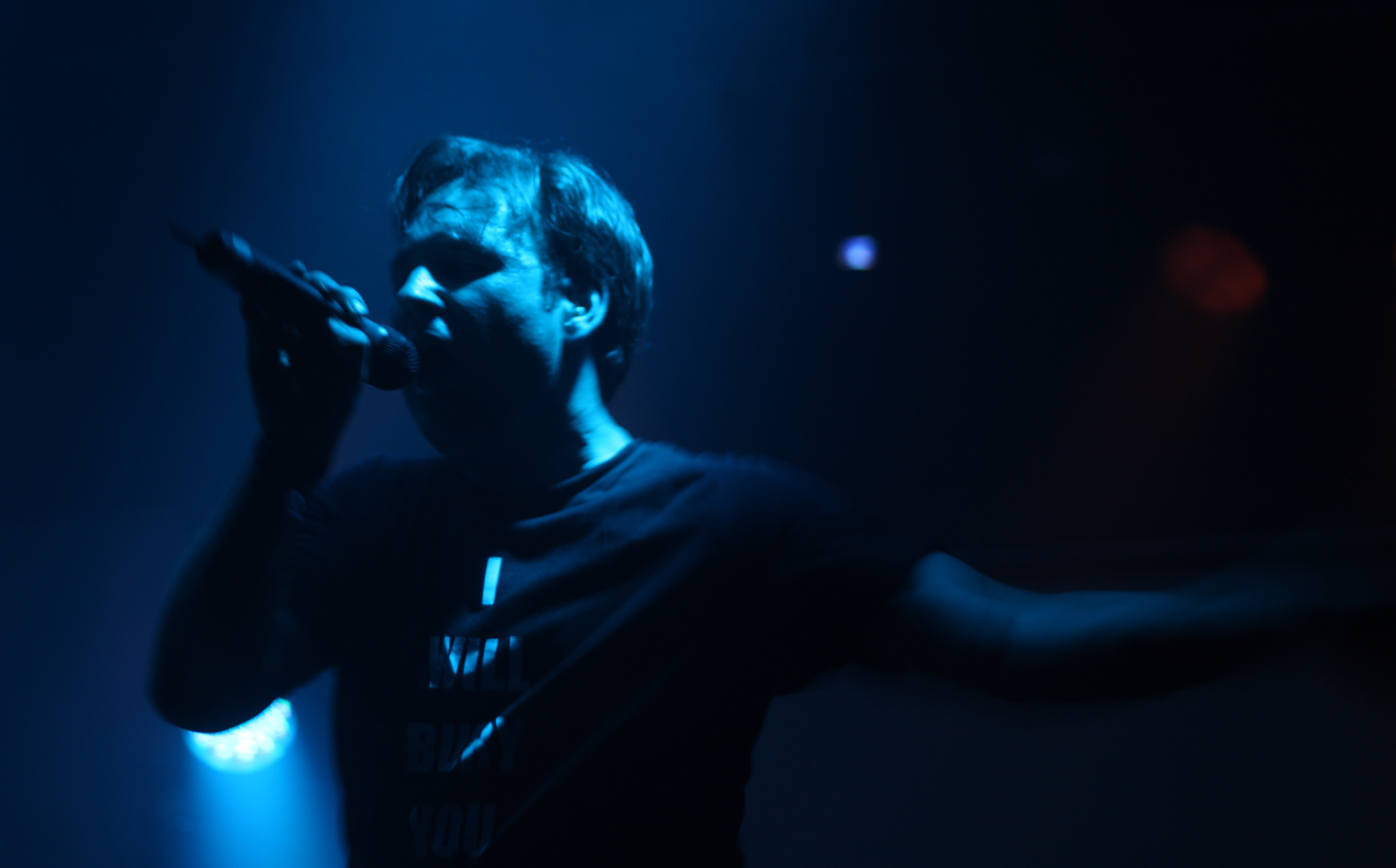
- Resistanz 2014

Background information
- Origin: Germany
- Genres: Trance, techno, downtempo, futurepop, synth-pop
- Years active: 1995–present
- Labels: Dependent, Metropolis
- Members: Frank M. Spinath; Martin Vorbrodt
- Website: seabound.de

Seabound is an electronic music duo from Germany. Their lyrics are in English and for the most part explore the human psyche and the way that everyday events can affect a person psychologically, hence the band's slogan: "Seabound: Journey into Your Mind."

== History ==
Seabound began in 1995 when Frank Spinath and Martin Vorbrodt were introduced by a mutual friend. They were so different musically that they weren't certain as to whether or not a musical collaboration between them would work. Despite the uncertainty they decided to try an informal jam-oriented home project. They soon realized that with a more focused approach, they might be able to produce something quite special. They made the band official and decided to call themselves Seabound. They decided on the name because of Spinath's love of the ocean and the fact that Vorbrodt was born near the shore. The name also implies a ship leaving from a safe harbor into the unknown and sometimes treacherous seas, a metaphor for the band itself. For live concerts they are supported by Daniel Wehmeier on drums.

The band recorded demos, which erroneously have come to now be known by fans as White Nights, a hastily proposed and shortly afterwards discarded working title for their Beyond Flatline album, and eventually caught the attention of dependent.

Their debut album No Sleep Demon was released by Dependent in 2001. Drawing influence from the beat-oriented sounds of Front 242 and Covenant, as well as new wave acts such as Visage and Depeche Mode, the album proved to be relatively successful in the European EBM and Darkwave scenes. Tracks such as Travelling and Hooked were well-suited for club play; that exposure made the band known for their warm vocals, icy synth parts, and entrancing, sinuous melodies.

2003 saw the release of the single "Contact", which peaked at number 6 on the German Alternative Charts (DAC) and ranked #100 on the DAC Top Singles for 2003.

They took their time recording the follow-up album Beyond Flatline. It was released in 2004 incorporating more of a trance influence into their sound. The duo embarked on a successful European tour with fellow Futurepop group Pride & Fall; this tour dawned the released a split EP entitled Beyond Flatline Tour 2004. The release featured a remix of the duo's single at that time "Watching Over You". Later that year the duo's debut album No Sleep Demon was re-released as No Sleep Demon V2.0 presenting new mixes of the songs "Hooked" and "Avalost".

In 2006 their third album, Double-Crosser, was released, reaching No. 1 on the DAC and German Electronic Web Charts (GEWC). The album also reached No. 3 Hellenic Alternative Charts (HAC) and No. 6 Nordic Alternative Charts (NAC).

In 2009, Seabound released When Black Beats Blue, an album containing rare and unreleased tracks. Seabound are the only band Die Form has remixed, and this album contains a version of Domination remixed by them.

After 2009, Seabound took a break since Vorbrodt married and moved to California. The band released their latest album Speak in Storms in February 2014 and scored an entry in the German Media Control Charts (MCC), the German equivalent to the Billboard charts. The album was released in three different editions, from which two edition are 2-disc versions and were limited. The Tempest Edition of Speak in Storms was released in Book form and sold out within 2 months after release.

== Live performances ==
Seabound has played various tours, mainly in Europe and North America. A complete archive of their live shows is available on their website.

== Discography ==
=== Albums ===
1. Die Blaue (Unreleased) (1996)
2. No Sleep Demon (2001)
3. Beyond Flatline (2004)
4. No Sleep Demon v2.0 (2004)
5. Double-Crosser (2006)
6. Come Forward: Live in Berlin (2008)
7. When Black Beats Blue (Rarities) (2009)
8. Speak in Storms (2014)

=== Singles and EPs ===
1. Travelling (2001)
2. Hooked Promo MCD (2001)
3. Contact (2003)
4. Dependent Club Invasion (2003)
5. Poisonous Friend EP (2004)
6. Beyond Flatline Tour 2004 (2004)

Full artist discography:

=== Side projects ===
- Vorbrodt has done remixes for multiple artists, including Haujobb and Stromkern
