= Agon (band) =

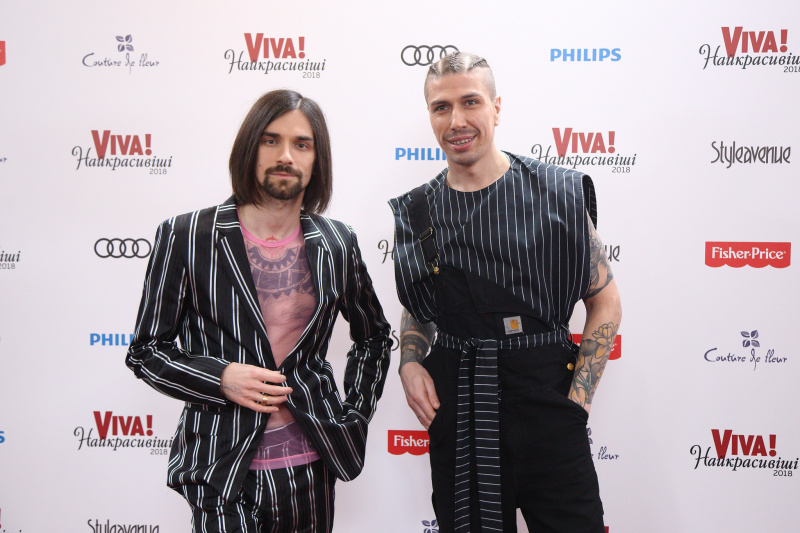

Background information
- Origin: Kyiv, Ukraine
- Genres: Pop, Electronic, Dance, House
- Years active: 2016–present
- Label: Warner Music
- Spinoff of: Quest Pistols Show
- Website: agon.band

Agon (Ukrainian: Агонь, translation from Russian slang: Fire) is a Ukrainian-based pop boyband from Ukraine made up of Anton Savlepov, Konstantine Borovski and Nikita Goryuk. Assembled in Kyiv in 2016 by former members of Quest Pistols Show, the group has released one album and several singles so far. In November 2017 the three most popular music videos of Agon had a total of over 20 million views on YouTube.

== Overview ==
The band was formed by three former members of the Ukrainian pop band Quest Pistols Show – Anton Savlepov (born 1988), Konstantine Borovski (born 1981) and Nikita Goryuk (born 1985) in January 2016 after they had collaborated from 2007 in the previous band whose music videos had tens of millions of views.

== Music and lyrics ==
The author of both music and lyrics of both Agon and its predecessor Quest Pistols is Sasha Chemerov whose own former Ukrainian band Dymna Sumish (1998–2012) and present US band The Gitas performed grunge. Despite Sasha Chemerov always singing in Ukrainian and English, the language of songs of Agon is Russian.

== Other facts ==
=== Name ===
The name of the band Agon is a Russian word for fire written with help of Phonemic orthography (written as it sounds in Russian, in slang) – but in fact, the Belarusian word for fire is written as Агонь (Agon).

=== Stance regarding Russia-Ukraine war ===
Despite Ukrainian Parliament in January 2015 recognised Russia as aggressor state, «Agon» several times gave concerts in Russia mainly in Moscow

=== Lifestyle ===
All three members of «Agon» are vegetarians from no later than 2005 and they made this choice under influence of their songwriter Sasha Chemerov

== Discography ==
=== Studio albums ===
- #Ябудулюбитьтебя (2016), Warner (translation from Russian: #Iwillloveyou)

== Music videos ==
Year	Title
2016	«Отпусти»
2016	«Каждый за себя»
2016	«Лето»
2016	«Опа Опа»
2017	«Супергерой»
2017	«Беги»
