= Sofia Tarasova =

Ukrainian singer and actress (born 2001)

Sofia Tarasova Софія Тарасова
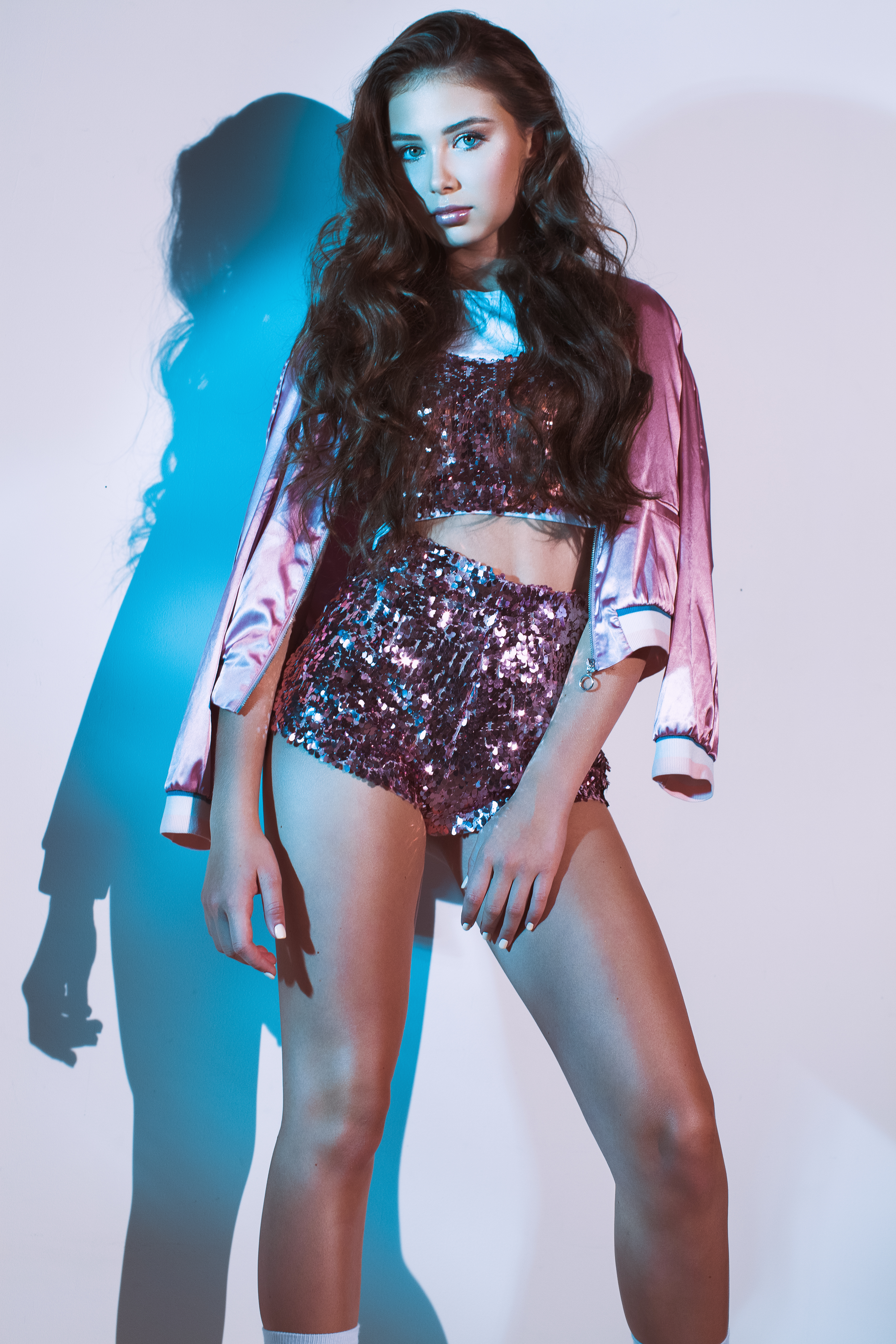
- Sofia Tarasova in 2016

Background information
- Born: Sofia Mikhaylivna Tarasova; 31 March 2001 (age 25); Kyiv, Ukraine
- Genres: Pop
- Occupations: singer; actor
- Instrument: Vocals
- Years active: 2006–present
- Formerly of: Nu Virgos

Sofia Mikhaylivna Tarasova (Ukrainian: Софія Михайлівна Тарасова; born 31 March 2001) is a Ukrainian singer, actress and former member of the Ukrainian girl group Nu Virgos. She represented Ukraine at the Junior Eurovision Song Contest 2013, with the song "We Are One", placing 2nd overall with 121 points.

== Early life ==
Sofia Tarasova was born on 31 March 2001 in Kyiv, the capital of Ukraine, to Russian parents from Saint Petersburg. She began to display vocal talents at the age of two and a half, whereupon her perfect pitch ensured her entrance into a group for gifted children at the prestigious Reinhold M. Gliere Music College in her hometown. Subsequently, 4-year old Tarasova successfully passed an examination to enter the preparatory division of the Academy of Arts, allowing her to study in the fields of music, choreography and art. Moreover, at age 6, Tarasova joined the "Chunga-Changa" show theatre, which provided the singer with acting classes and the opportunity to perform leading roles in musicals. In a 2013 biography, the singer stated "Gerda" in The Snow Queen was a favourite theatrical role. At ten, she entered the "PARADIZ" centre, where she, as of 2013, took place for tuition in voice, choreography, modelling and acting.

== Musical career ==
=== 2012: The Voice of Ukraine Junior, Junior Eurovision 2012 and Euro Pop Contest 2012 ===
In 2012, Tarasova won Holos. Dity, the children's edition of the Ukrainian version of The Voice. In the same year, she also took part in the Ukrainian national selection for the Junior Eurovision Song Contest 2012 with the song "Zhityeviy Pazl" (Puzzle of Life), but was not chosen to represent the nation. Tarasova also represented her country for the first time at the Euro Pop Contest, a singing contest held in Berlin, that has a similar format to the Eurovision Song Contest.

=== 2013: New Wave Junior, Eurovision Music Academy and Junior Eurovision 2013 ===
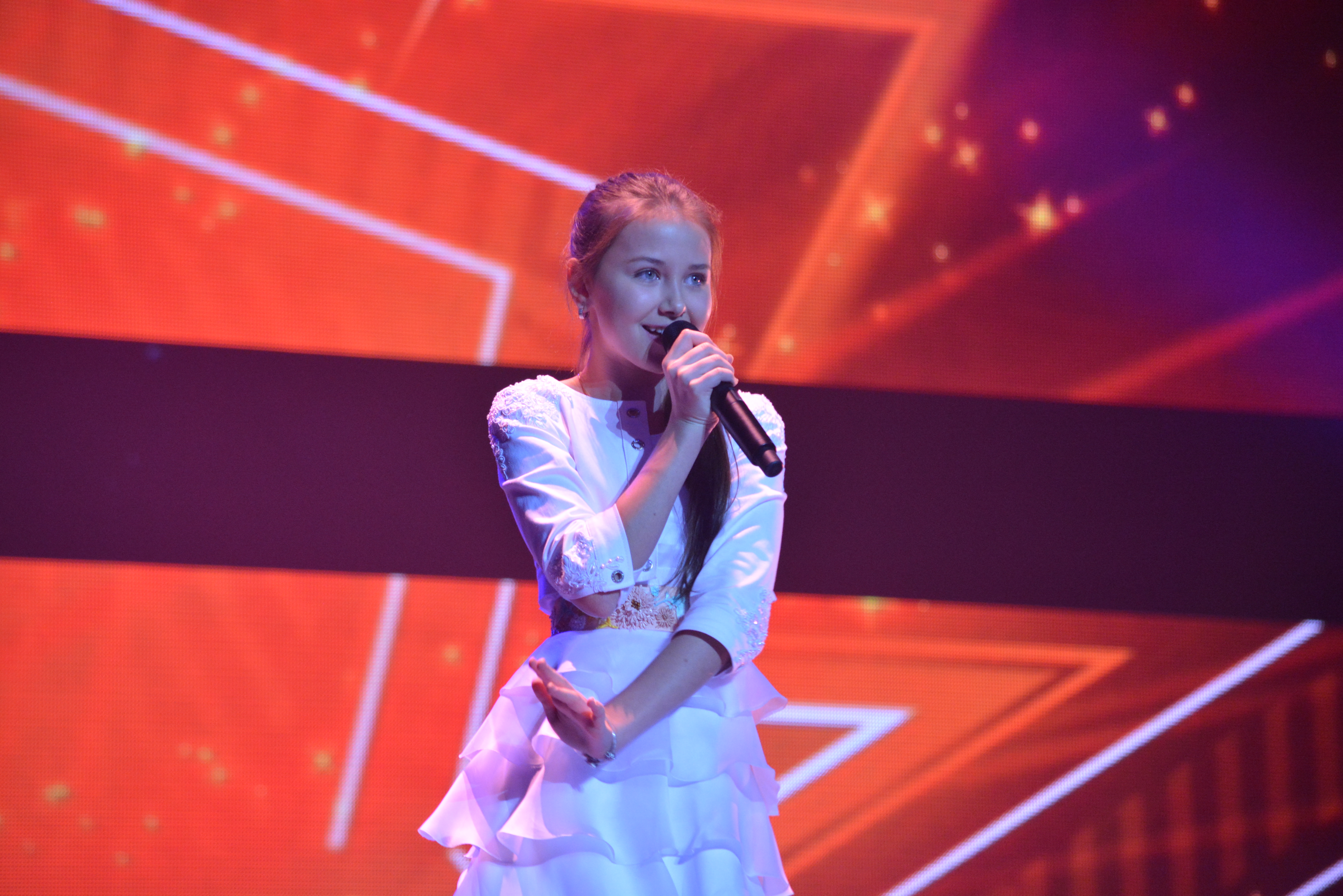
Sofia Tarasova during a rehearsal at the Junior Eurovision Song Contest 2013

Tarasova won the VI International Pop Performers Competition "New Wave Junior" in 2013, and in the same year she also won the "Eurovision Music Academy". On 2 August 2013, Sofia competed in the Ukrainian selection for the 2013 contest with her song "We Are One," finishing first in a field of 20 candidates, winning the right to represent her nation. Tarasova's song placed 2nd with 121 points.

=== 2014: "Ver' mne" and Euro Pop Contest 2014 ===
In late April 2014, Tarasova released a new original song called "Ver' mne" (Believe me). The music video was released on 21 May 2014. Tarasova was chosen to read the points for Ukraine at the Junior Eurovision Song Contest 2014 in Marsa, Malta on 15 November.

Tarasova competed for the second time at the Euro Pop Contest and on 1 December 2014 she won first place in the 10–13 category. She was to be a member of the Ukrainian jury for the Eurovision Song Contest 2017, but withdrew for personal reasons.

=== 2018: The Voice ===
In October 2018, Tarasova decided to compete in season 7 of Golos, the Russian version of The Voice. She performed "I'm Your Baby Tonight" by Whitney Houston, leading all four coaches choosing her, after which she selected to be a part of Team Konstantin. In the Battle round, Tarasova competed against Ekaterina Korotkova in their joint cover of "Obiymy" (Обiйми; lit. Embrace) by Okean Elzy. Tarasova won the battle, thus reaching the knockout stage. During the knockout performance, Tarasova sang "Ty otpusti" (Ты отпусти; lit. You let go) by Tina Karol, and later qualified for the live shows. During the quarterfinal, Tarasova sang "Amerikanskaya zhena" (Американская жена; lit. American wife) from the movie Stilyagi, in which she qualified for the next round. In the semi-final, she performed "We Are the World" by USA for Africa. Despite positive feedback from the coaches, Tarasova was eliminated from the semi-final.

=== 2019–present: Solo career ===
She started performing under the pseudonym SOFA and released three singles "Мы стоим у воды" (We're standing by the water), "Киев-Москва" (Kiev-Moscow), and "Харизма" (Charisma). "Не обижай меня" (Don't hurt me) and the feature song "Одуванчиков поле" (Dandelion Field) were released afterwards.

On 8 September 2023 she released a new single featuring Konstantin Meladze titled ″Почему я?″ (Why me?).

=== 2020–2022: VIA Gra ===
On 6 November 2020, Tarasova joined the Ukrainian pop group Nu Virgos.

On 22 February 2022 due to the 2022 Russian invasion of Ukraine, the group disbanded.

== Discography ==
=== Singles ===
==== Solo ====
| Year | Title | English translation | Album |
|---|---|---|---|
| 2012 | "Zhityeviy pazl" | Puzzle of life | Non-album singles |
| 2013 | "We Are One" | – | Non-album singles |
| 2013 | "Zminyty vse" | To change everything | Non-album singles |
| 2013 | "Bryunetki krasche" | Brunettes are more pretty | Non-album singles |
| 2014 | "Ver' mne" | Believe me | Non-album singles |
| 2014 | "Happy End" | – | Non-album singles |
| 2015 | "Vos'moe chudo" | Eighth wonder | Non-album singles |
| 2015 | "Neba dozhdi" | Heaven's rain | Non-album singles |
| 2016 | "Sestra" | Sister | Non-album singles |
| 2016 | "Letet' vysoko" | Fly high | Non-album singles |
| 2016 | "Everybody" | – | Non-album singles |
| 2016 | "Forever Young" | – | Non-album singles |
| 2016 | "Doshi" | Rain | Non-album singles |
| 2017 | "V glaza" | In your eyes | Non-album singles |
| 2018 | "Leave Me Alone" | – | Non-album singles |

==== As featured artist ====
| Year | Title | English translation | Album |
|---|---|---|---|
| 2014 | "Mir bez voyny" (with Respublika Kids and Open Kids) | World without wars | Non-album singles |
| 2020 | Oduvanchikov pole (with MARUSHOVA) | Dandelion field | Non-album singles |
| 2023 | Pochemu Ya (with Konstantin Meladze) | Why me | Non-album singles |

With Nu Virgos

| Year | Title | English translation | Album |
|---|---|---|---|
| 2020 | Рикошет | Ricochet | Non-album singles |
| 2021 | Антигейша Родниковая Вода Манекен | Antigeisha Rodnikovaya Voda Maneken | Non-album singles |

=== Music videos ===
- 2014 – Ver' mne
- 2014 – Zminyty vse
- 2014 – We Are One (English version only)
- 2014 – Mir bez voyny (with members of Respublika Kids and Open Kids)
- 2016 – Letet' vysoko
- 2018 – Leave Me Alone

Awards and achievements
| Preceded by Anastasiya Petryk with "Nebo" | Ukraine in the Junior Eurovision Song Contest; 2013 | Succeeded by Sympho-Nick with "Pryyde vesna" |
