= Oleksandr Chemerov =

Ukrainian rock musician

Oleksandr Chemerov Олександр Чемеров
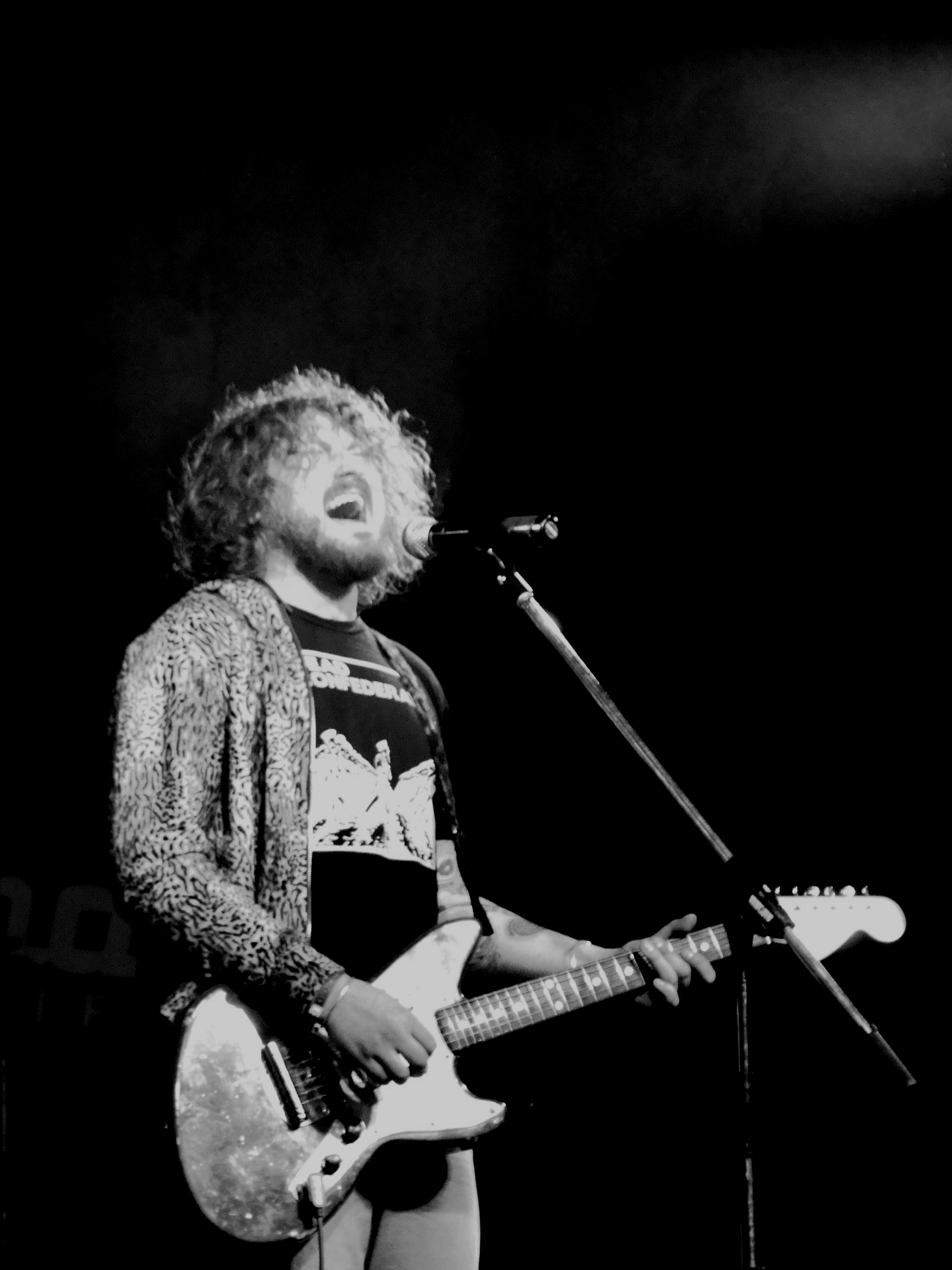
- Chemerov in 2012

Background information
- Born: 4 August 1981 (age 44); Chernihiv, Ukrainian SSR, Soviet Union
- Origin: Ukraine
- Genres: grunge, alternative, pop rock, pop music, dance music
- Occupations: musician, singer-songwriter, record-producer, poet, dj
- Instruments: vocal, electric guitar, acoustic guitar
- Years active: 1998–present
- Website: https://www.thegitas.com

Oleksandr "Sasha" Valeriiovych Chemerov (Ukrainian: Олександр «Саша» Валерійович Чемеров; born 4 August 1981) is a Ukrainian rock musician, songwriter, DJ and the frontman of Ukrainian rock band Dymna Sumish and of US rock band The Gitas. Also, he was the author (both music and lyrics) of the songs for the bands Quest Pistols Show (before 2016) and Agon, for actor, TV presenter and singer Arthur Pirozhkov and for singer Valeria Kozlova, also he was the author of lyrics for songs of English-language album of Ivan Dorn. Music videos of songs written by Sasha Chemerov had hundreds of millions of views on YouTube as of May 2020.

== Biography ==
Oleksandr Chemerov was born on August 4, 1981, in Chernihiv a Ukrainian city 148 km (91 mi) north to the capital Kyiv. His father was a restaurateur and local politician and mother was stewardess. He began to play rock music in the age of 14 and in 1998 he founded the band Dymna Sumish which played mainly grunge and already in 1999 won the second place on Chervona Ruta (festival) and in next years won highest places on several another festivals including Woodstock Festival (Poland). The band released three albums: Ty zhyvyi (2005) (Ти живий), V kraini iliuziy (2008) (В країні ілюзій) and Dymna Sumish (2009) (Димна Суміш).

== Songwriting ==
=== Quest Pistols and Agon ===
Oleksandr Chemerov was the author of music and lyrics of Ukrainian pop-rock band Quest Pistols Show from its emerging in 2007 to 2015 and then he became the author of songs of successor of this band which name is Agon. The Chemerov's songs of Quest Pistols had in May 2020 more than 100 mln views on YouTube in total and about 42 mln views for Agon.

=== Arthur Pirozhkov ===
In 2010-2018 Oleksandr Chemerov wrote music and lyrics for several songs of very popular (6,6 mln followers of his account in Instagram) Russian actor, TV presenter and singer Arthur Pirozhkov. The Chemerov's songs of Arthur Pirozhkov had in May 2020 more than 100 mln views in Youtube.

=== Valeria Kozlova ===
In 2010 the album "Dai mne znak" of Russian singer Valeria Kozlova with all 12 Chemerov's songs was released

=== Ivan Dorn ===
The lyrics of all songs of the English-language album "OTD" (2017) of Ukrainian singer Ivan Dorn was written by Oleksandr Chemerov.

== Moving to USA and The Gitas ==
In 2012 Oleksandr Chemerov moved from Ukraine to the United States. In January 2015 he founded in Los Angeles the English-language rock band "The Gitas" which released EP "Garland" in 2015 and 13-track album "Beverly Kills" in 2017.
