= Ivan Dorn =

Ukrainian singer (born 1988)

Ivan Dorn Иван Дорн Іван Дорн
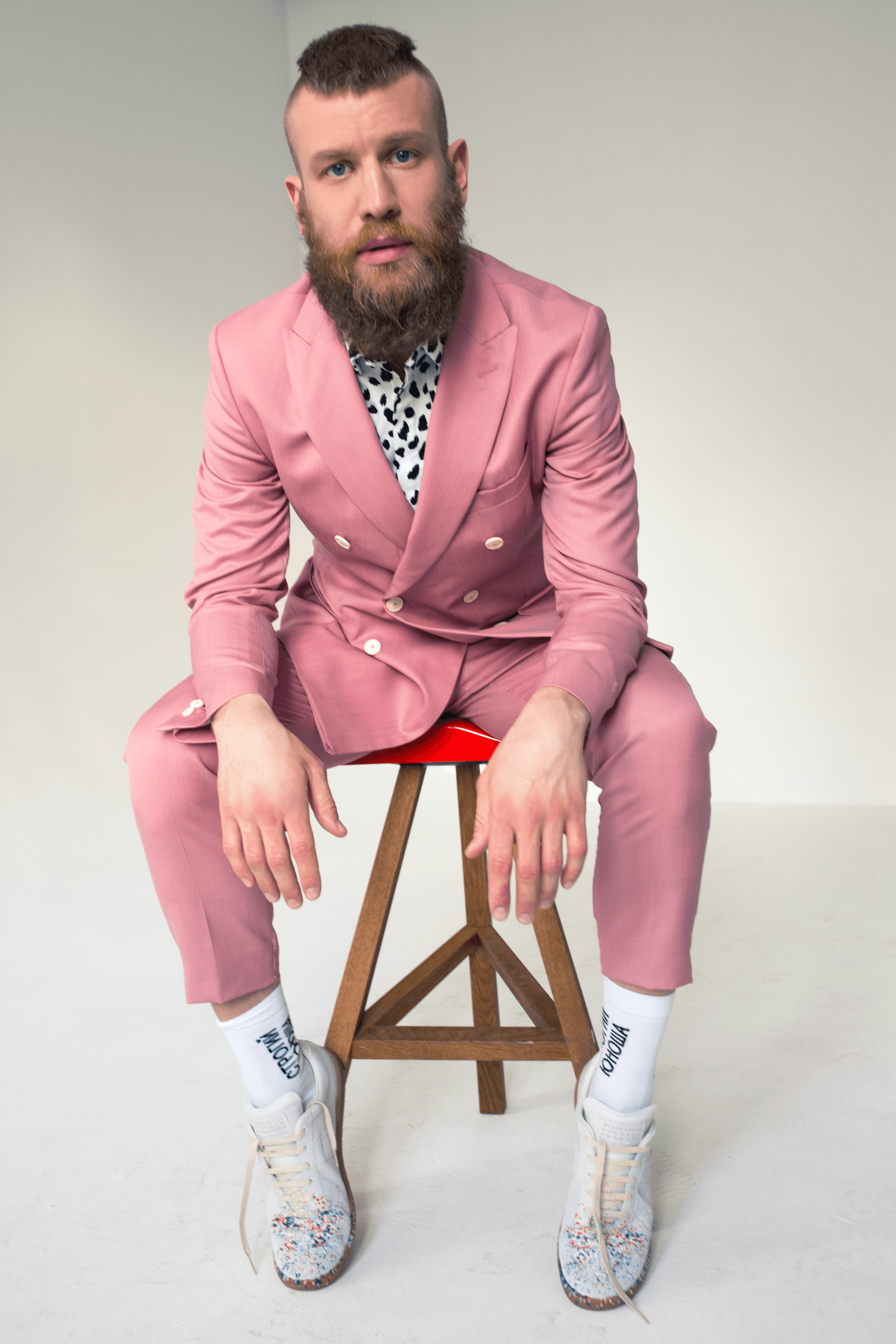
- Dorn in 2017

Background information
- Born: Ivan Aleksandrovich Yeryomin; 17 October 1988 (age 37); Chelyabinsk, Russian SFSR Soviet Union
- Genres: Alternative Pop; Funk; House; Jazz; Soul; R&B; Disco; Hip Hop
- Occupations: Singer; songwriter; record producer; actor; TV host
- Instruments: singing; keyboard
- Years active: 2006–present
- Label: Masterskaya
- Website: ivandorn.com

Ivan Oleksandrovich Dorn (Ukrainian: Іван Олександрович Дорн), born Ivan Aleksandrovich Yeryomin (Russian: Иван Александрович Ерёмин; born 17 October 1988), is a Ukrainian singer and actor. He is also active as a DJ, TV presenter and producer, and a former member of the band Para Normalnyh (Пара Нормальных). Since 2010 he has been a solo artist. His music combines elements of house, disco, pop, jazz, funk, UK garage, hip-hop and soul. He won an MTV EMA in 2017.

== Biography ==
Ivan Dorn was born 17 October 1988 in Chelyabinsk, Russia (at the time part of the Soviet Union). His family is of German-Ukrainian descent. At the age of two, he and his family moved to the Ukrainian city of Slavutych, Ukraine. Until second grade, he had the last name "Eryomin" until his mother, Lidia Dorn, changed it to be the same as her own. He began acting at the age of 6 years at the festival «Gold autumn of Slavutich».

Ivan actively engaged in sport, winning several prizes in curling and lacrosse. Ivan also received training in piano, winning several competitions including:

- The Moscow competition «Light your star» – 1st place
- «Pearl of Crimea» – the prize of spectator sympathies
- «The Black sea games» (2001 won 3rd place, 2005 won the 2nd prize)
- «Yurmala 2008»

== Career ==
In 2006, he sang in a Moscow a cappella duo, but soon decided to return to Ukraine to join the Kyiv National I. K. Karpenko-Kary Theatre, Cinema and Television University. In 2006, at a Jamiroquai concert, he met Anna Dobrydneva and together they created the duo «Para Normalnykh» ("A Pair of Normals").

From 2007 to 2010, he continued to sing with Anna but then in 2010 she began working with Ukrainian singer Artem Meh. In 2008, on invitation by the TV producer Oleksandr Asaulyuk Dorn began his TV career as the host of the program Guten Morgen on M1 channel.

He released his debut studio album "Co'N'Dorn" in 2012 which had made a huge impact on both Russian and Ukrainian scene and won many awards. Dorn was honoured as "an idol for a new generation."

In 2014, Dorn was a judge on the fifth season of X Factor Ukraine.

In the summer of 2014, Dorn took part in the New wave music festival in Jūrmala, where he performed the Ukrainian-language song of the Skryabin (band) – 'Penguin Dance' dressed in a sweater with the image of the coat of arms of Ukraine. This act received positive reviews in Ukraine. In Russia, because of this, the singer was suggested to be banned. But he wasn't banned and remains popular. In Ukraine Dorn was criticized for continuing to performing in Russia following the 2014 Russian military intervention in Ukraine. This criticism was somewhat relieved when it was reported that Dorn had secretly donated $10,000 to the Ukrainian army in 2014. However, Dorn denied this in an April 2017 interview with Yury Dud. He claimed he had donated not to the military, but specifically to civilians who had been affected by shelling, but that the volunteer who was in charge of spending the money used part of it to buy army supplies, and publicly thanked Dorn for that, putting the singer in "an uncomfortable position." Also in the online interview with Dud, Dorn claimed that had worn the Ukrainian symbol at the 2014 New wave music festival "so that people wouldn’t make a stink," apparently meaning that he wanted to avoid criticism from his compatriots, who, he recalls, criticized another Ukrainian performer for wearing a costume with the colors of the Russian flag at the same event.

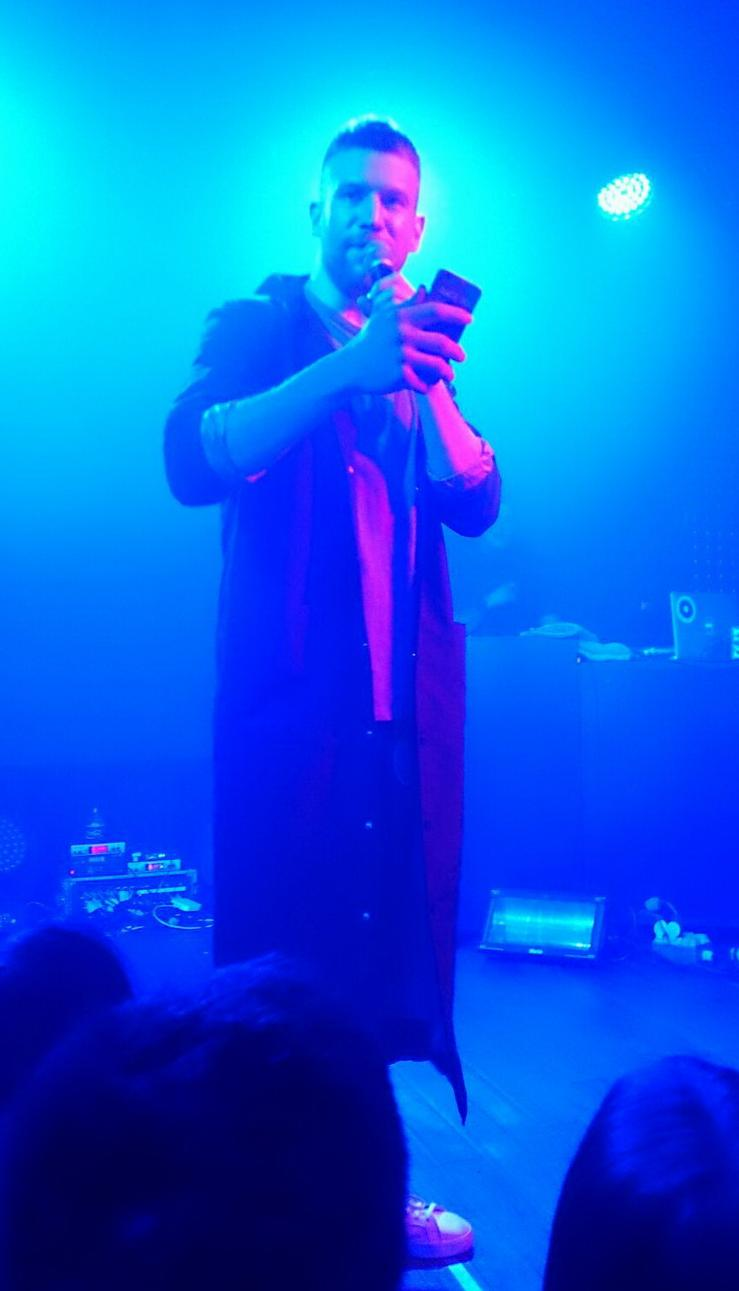
Dorn performing in Ufa, Russia, 2016

In 2016, Dorn was a coach at The Voice Ukraine.

In 2016, Dorn started Masterskaya, an independent music label focused on bringing the exciting sound of Ukrainian underground to the main stage.

In June 2016 Dorn, to appease activists in Lviv who threatened to cancel his concert there, put on his official Facebook page a map of Ukraine which included Crimea (Crimea is de jure, an autonomous republic of Ukraine, though it was unilaterally annexed by Russia in 2014), a fragment of the Ukrainian anthem and the words "We will win".

In February 2017, Dorn released his first live album "Jazzy Funky Dorn" which reflects his passion to funk music.

In April 2017 Dorn, in the online interview with Yury Dud, labeled the War in Donbas (which had already claimed more than 10,000 lives) a "quarrel" and made several other remarks that were criticized in Ukraine. Dorn was criticized for not being a patriot of Ukraine while seeking to please his Russian audience. In the same interview, Dorn also referred to Ukraine and Russia, as "younger and older brothers," a description that is favored in Russia but disliked by many in Ukraine. Ukrainian Culture Minister Yevhen Nyshchuk was one of those who lashed out at Dorn, saying that it was Dorn's choice whether to donate money to Ukrainian army or not, but "talking about a quarrel as if nothing is happening (in eastern Ukraine) is unworthy."

Later in 2017, Dorn began working on his first English-language album in Los Angeles. The author of the lyrics of this album was famous former Ukrainian rock musician Sasha Chemerov. His US debut album premiered in 2017.

In June 2017 Dorn cancelled a concert in Odesa after threats that it would be disrupted by Ukrainian nationalists who claimed Dorn "supported the war against Ukraine".

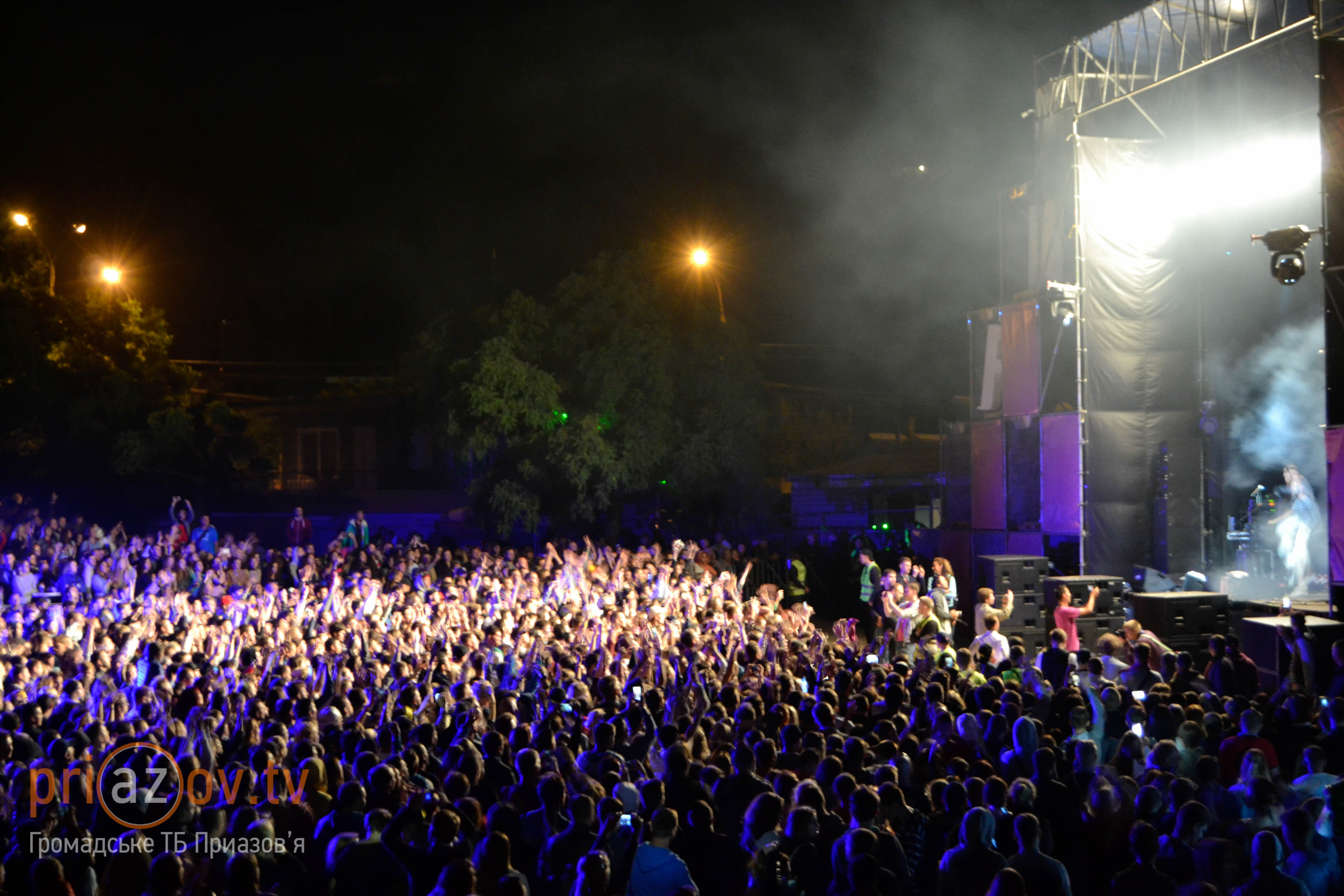
Dorn's concert in Mariupol, Ukraine, 2017

In 2017 won MTV EMA 2017 for "Best MTV Russia act". Dorn did not attend the ceremony, but showed in Instagram that he was happy for his victory.

In 2018 Dorn traveled to Uganda to film a music video Afrika with Masaka Kids Africana dance crew and a documentary about them. This grew into a charity project called AFRIKA, with a main goal to build a dancing school for Masaka Kids Africana in Uganda.

At the end of 2018 he released a track called "Right Wrong" featuring HER's Victor Solf

Dorn starred in his first film, Petrov's Flu, which premiered at the 2021 Cannes Film Festival in July 2021. According to the director, Kirill Serebrennikov, Dorn was a "wonderful dramatic artist" with "an interest in the paradoxical, energy, control of his tools, an ability to exactly recreate the image he wanted to impress on his audience, and a very deliberate approach to art." Dorn announced that with this film he would end his musical career and begin his acting career.

In February 2022, Dorn condemned the Russian invasion of Ukraine. He was subsequently included in a list of artists who are banned from performing in Russia. In March 2022, Dorn's label Masterskaya closed its music catalogue for users from Russia and Belarus.

== Discography ==
=== Albums ===
As a member of "Para Normalnyh"

- 2008 «Я придумаю Happy End» (I'll Devise a Happy End)
- 2010 «Скандал во время рекламы» (Scandal during an Ad)

Solo career

- 2012 "Co'N'Dorn"
- 2014 "Randorn"
- 2017 "Jazzy Funky Dorn" (Live Album)
- 2017 OTD (Open the Dorn)
- 2019 3 Хороших Песни

=== Singles ===
Year	Name
2008	"Happy End"
2009	"Scandal"
2010	Тем Более ("Tem bolee"/"All The More")
2011	"Stytsaman"
2011	Ненавижу ("Nenavizhu"/"I Hate")
2011	Северное сияние ("Severnoe Syanie"/"Northern Lights")
2012	Синими, жёлтыми, красными ("Sinimi, Zheltymi, Krasnymi"/"By Blue, Yellow and Red")
2012	Идолом ("Idolom"/"By Idol")
2012	Бигуди ("Bigudi"/"Curler")
2013	Невоспитанный ("Nevospitanniy"/"Ill-Mannered")
2014	Номер 23 ("Nomer 23"/"No.23")
2017	"Collaba"
2017	"OTD"
2018	"Kaida feat. Moldanazar"
2018	"Опомнись (feat. Vakula)"
2018	"Diplo & MØ feat. Ivan Dorn – Stay Open"
2018	"Right Wrong feat. Victor Solf"

=== Videography ===
Year	Song	Director
2011	«Стыцамэн» (Stytsaman)	Дмитрий и Евгений Мисюра
2011	«Так сильно» (So Strongly)	Дмитрий и Евгений Мисюра
2011	«Северное сияние» (Northern Lights)	Дмитрий и Евгений Мисюра
2012	«Синими, жёлтыми, красными» (By Blue, Yellow, Red)	Дмитрий и Евгений Мисюра
2012	«Идолом» (By Idol)	Дмитрий и Евгений Мисюра
2013	«Невоспитанный» (Ill-Mannered)	Дмитрий и Евгений Мисюра
2015	«Телепорт» (Teleport)	Ivan Dorn
2016	"Ты всегда в плюсе" (You're always in advantage)	Maria Unzhakova
2017	"Collaba"	Aisultan Seitov
2017	"OTD"	Aisultan Seitov
2017	"Beverly"	Aisultan Seitov
2017	«Мастерской огонёк (feat. YUKO, гурт [О] & Constantine)» (Masterskaya's lights)	Павел Бекезин
2017	«Стыцамэн (Найденная версия)» (Stytsamen (Found version))	//
2018	"Preach"	Misha Koroteev
2018	"Afrika"	Aisultan Seitov
2018	«Опомнись» (Wake up!)	Евгений Мисюра

=== Documentaries ===
Year	Documentary	Director
2013	«Невоспитанные» (Ill-Mannered)	Gena Trunov
2015	RANDORN Tour	Gena Trunov & Kirill Filippov
2016	RAINDORN. Live on Helipad	Gena Trunov
2017	Уезжать / Jazzy Funky Dorn (Live)	Gena Trunov
2017	Телепорт / Jazzy Funky Dorn (live)	Gena Trunov
2017	Лимонадный feat. Kasta / Jazzy Funky Dorn (live)	Gena Trunov
2018	OTD Live	Gena Trunov
2018	Power of Afrika	Gena Trunov

== Filmography ==
- "How to find the ideal?" (2008)
- "In Love with the Kyiv" (2011)
- "Hotel Transylvania" (Ukrainian dubbing) — Jonathan
- "12 months" (2013)
- "Funny guys" (2014)
- "Hotel Transylvania 2" (Ukrainian dubbing) — Jonathan
- Petrov's Flu— Sergei

== Awards and nominations ==
=== Berlin Music Video Awards ===
The Berlin Music Video Awards is an international festival that promotes the art of music videos.

Year	Nominated work	Award	Result	Ref.
2025	Foreign Root	Best Concept	Nominated	

Preceded by Volodymyr Klychko	Most beautiful by VIVA! 2012; With: Ani Lorak	Vacant Title suspended Title next held by Dmytro Komarov (2017)
