= Open Kids =

Ukrainian pop group

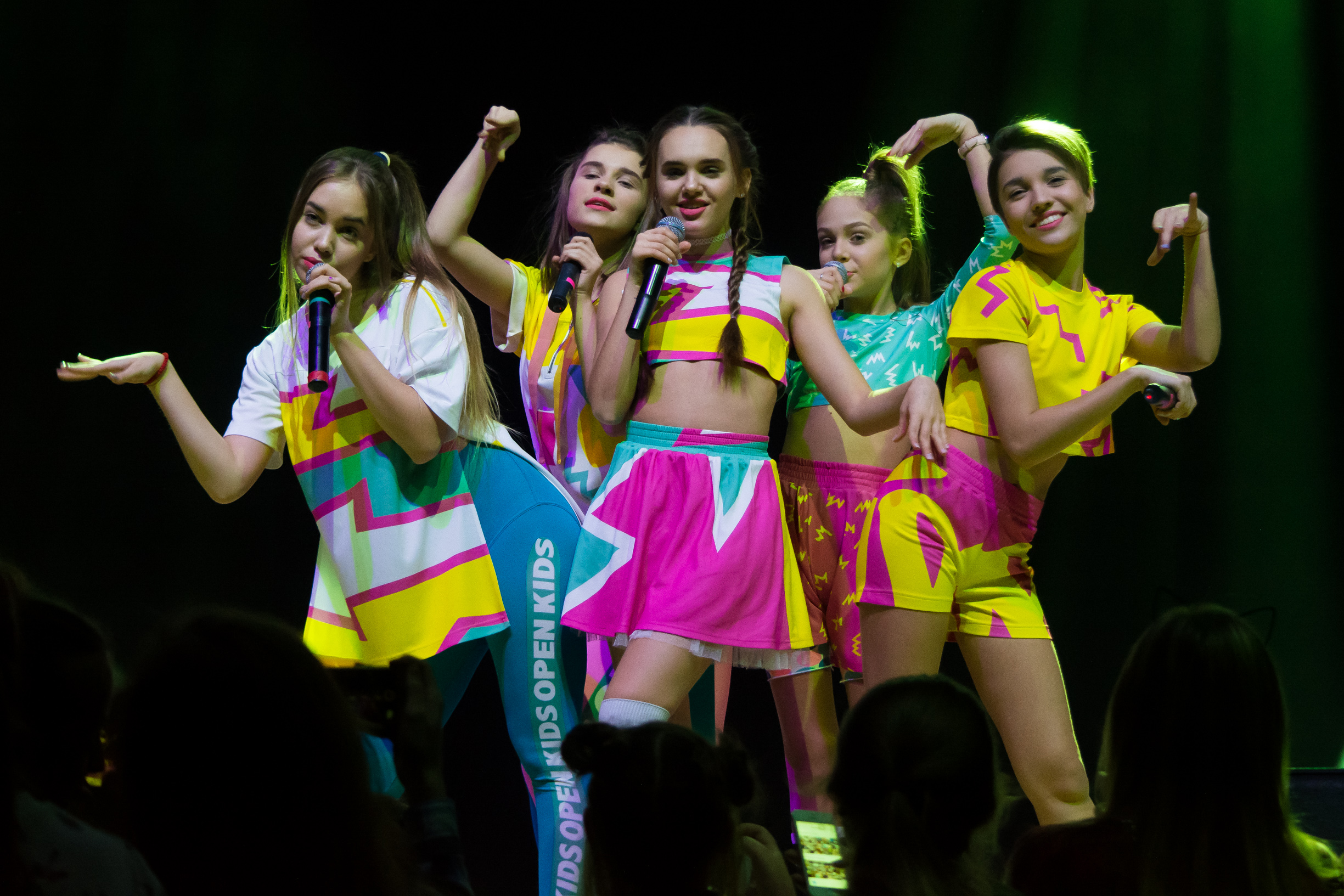
- Open Kids

Background information
- Origin: Kyiv, Ukraine
- Genre: pop
- Years active: 2012–present
- Labels: UMIG Music; Sony Music Entertainment
- Members: Angie; Kvitka; Sandra; Tamara Lova
- Past members: Viktoria Vernik; Anna Muzafarova; Angelina Romanovska; Lera Didkovska; Yulia Gamaliy; Anna Bobrovska; Elizaveta Kostyakina; Annika kozensitbs Monika Makhdavi
- Website: open-kids.com

Open Kids is a pop group consisting of four girls from Kyiv, Ukraine.

== History ==
The band officially formed on October 11, 2012, with the release of their first music video titled "Show Girls". Prior to this, the group trained together in the studio, initially without Annika Kozensitbs. Viktoria Vernik, Angelina Romanovska, Lera Didkovska, Yulia Gamaily, and Anna Bobrovska debuted on October 11, 2012, marking the formation of the first girl group of Open Art Dance Studio. Despite mainly living in the United States at that time, Annika Kozensky continued to be seen training with the members of Open Kids throughout the years.

On June 25, 2014, the group hosted a presentation event for their new music video "На Десерт" ("For Dessert") at City Beach Club in Kyiv, Ukraine. The video was filmed in Germany.

In early November 2015, it was announced that Vika Vernik left Open Kids to move to the United States, and in the same month, the group began casting for a fifth member.

In early December 2015, the band made their stage debut at the Caribbean Club in Kyiv.

In February 2016, Open Kids released their first love song, "Кажется" ("It Seems").

In October 2020, members of Open Kids announced via IGTV that they would no longer continue as a group. Shortly after, producers released information about casting for new members.

In 2021, a new lineup replaced the original one.

== Members ==
- Angelina "Angie" Biletska, born 29 November 2010 (age 15)
- Kvitka Vorobey, born 21 October 2011 (age 14)
- Sandra Smirnova, born 28 June 2009 (age 17)
- Tamara "Toma" Shpilova, born 30 September 2009 (age 17)

=== Former members ===
- Angelina Romanovska, born 22 December 2000 (age 25)
- Lera Didkovska, born 17 April 2000 (age 26)
- Yulia Gamaliy, born 30 August 2003 (age 23)
- Annika Kozensitbs, born December 03, 2003 (22)
- Anna Bobrovska, born 30 November 2002 (age 23)
- Elizaveta Kostyakina, born 31 August 2003 (age 23)
- Viktoria Vernik, born 16 February 2000 (age 26)
- Anna Muzafarova, born in Chelyabinsk, Russia, on 11 January 2002 (age 24)
- Monika Makhdavi, born 19 December 2008 (age 17)

== Management ==
The group is produced by Yuriy Petrov and Veronika Politaieva, the founders of Open Art Studio, a school of performing and fine arts in Kyiv.

== Discography ==
=== Singles and selected songs ===
| Year | Title | Charts | | |
| Year | Title | CIS | | RU |
| Year | Title | TopHit Weekly YouTube Top 10 | IVI Music Videos Top 50 | RU.TV Super 20 |
|---|---|---|---|---|
| 2012 | "Show Girls" | — | — | — |
| 2013 | "Stop People!" | — | — | — |
| 2014 | "На десерт" ("For Dessert") | — | — | — |
| 2015 | «Milky Way» | — | — | — |
| 2015 | "На радостях" ("In Joy") | — | — | — |
| 2015 | "Не танцуй!" ("Don't Dance!") | 9 | 5 | — |
| 2016 | "Кажется" ("It Seems") | — | 2 | — |
| 2016 | "Круче всех" ("Cooler than Everyone Else") (ft. Quest Pistols Show) | 10 | 2 | 1 |

==== As featured artist ====
| Year | Title | Charts | |
| Year | Title | CIS^{[A]} | |
| Year | Title | TopHit Weekly General | TopHit Weekly Audience Choice |
|---|---|---|---|
| 2015 | "Мир без войны" ("World Without War"): by Дети Земли (Children of the Earth) (feat. children from Respublika KIDS, Open Kids, Sofia Tarasova, etc.) | 313 | 283 |

^{[A]} The Top Hit Weekly General chart's rankings are based on airplay on 230 radio stations in Russia, as well as 200 Russian-language radio stations all over the world (in Ukraine, the CIS countries, the Baltic states, Cyprus, Israel, Germany, the United States, and Canada).

== Awards and nominations ==
| Year | Award | Category | Result |
|---|---|---|---|
| 2017 | Nickelodeon Kids' Choice Awards 2017 | Favorite Russian Music Act | Won |
