= The Voice (Russian TV series) season 7 =

The Voice
- Season 7
- Presented by: Dmitry Nagiev
- Coaches: Basta; Ani Lorak; Sergey Shnurov; Konstantin Meladze
- Winner: Petr Zakharov
- Winning coach: Konstantin Meladze
- Runner-up: Amirkhan Umaev

Release
- Original network: Channel One
- Original release: October 12, 2018 – January 1, 2019

Season chronology
- ← Previous; Season 6 Next → Season 8

The seventh season of the Russian reality talent show The Voice, that was called "Reloading", premiered on October 12, 2018, on Channel One. Dmitry Nagiev returned as the show's presenter. On August 22, 2018, Channel One announced that Basta, Ani Lorak, Sergey Shnurov, and Konstantin Meladze became the coaches.

Petr Zakharov was named winner of the season. With his victory, Konstantin Meladze became the second new coach to win on his first season, behind Grigory Leps.

== Coaches and presenter ==
The Voice season 7 coaches

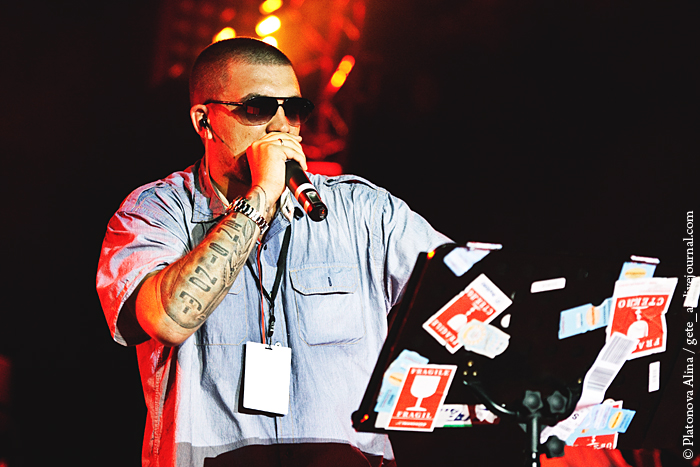
Basta

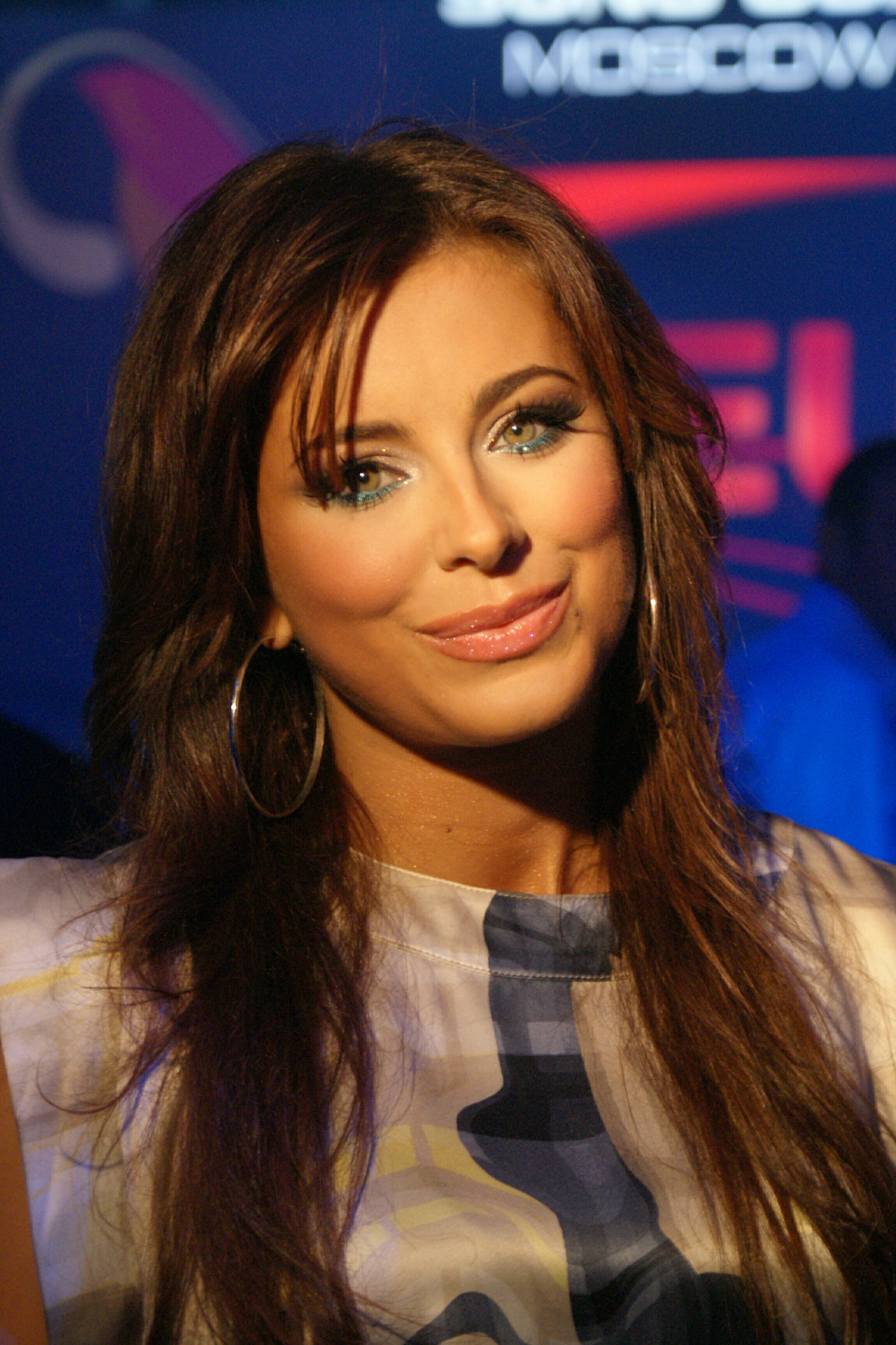
Ani Lorak

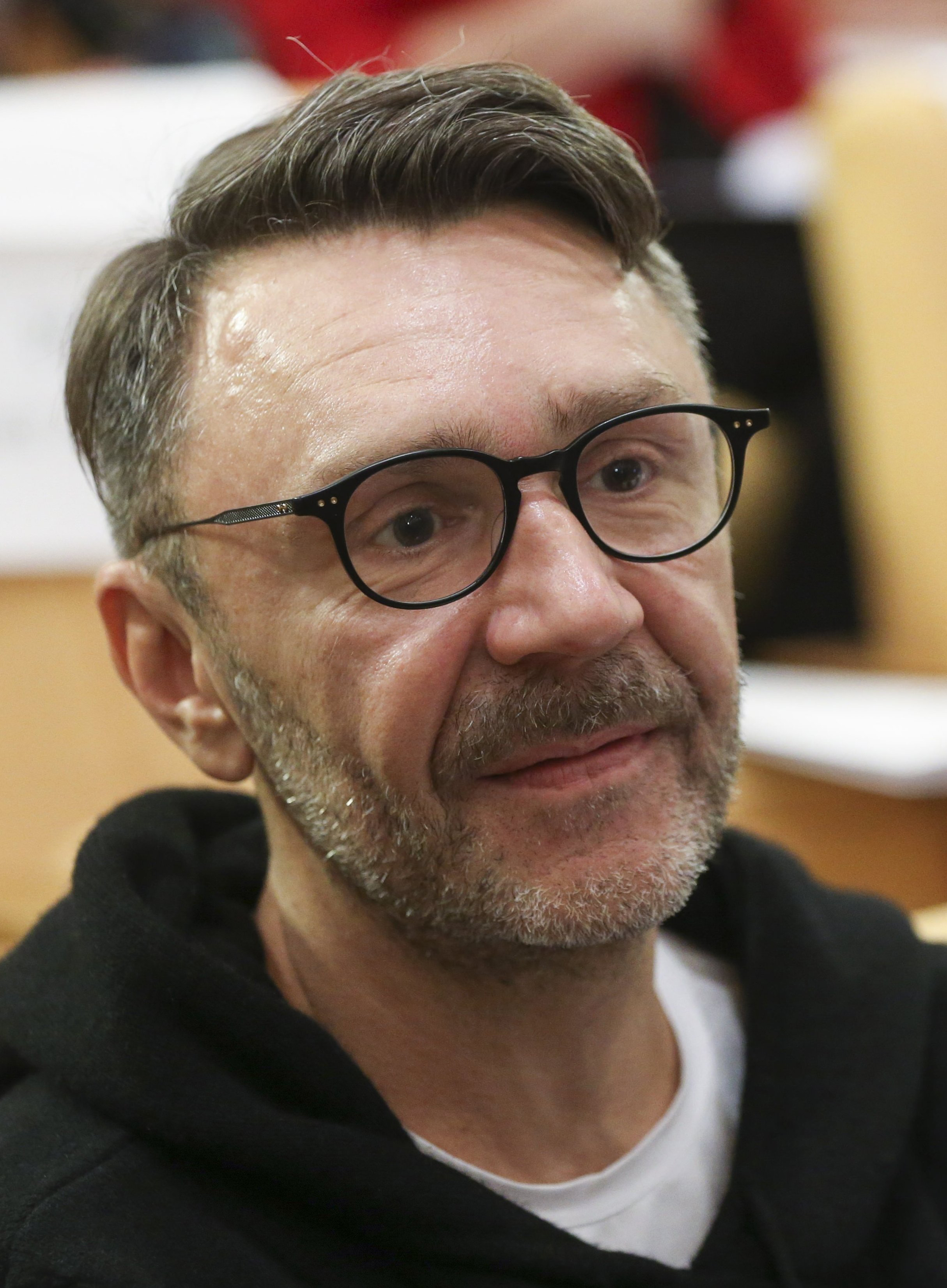
Sergey Shnurov

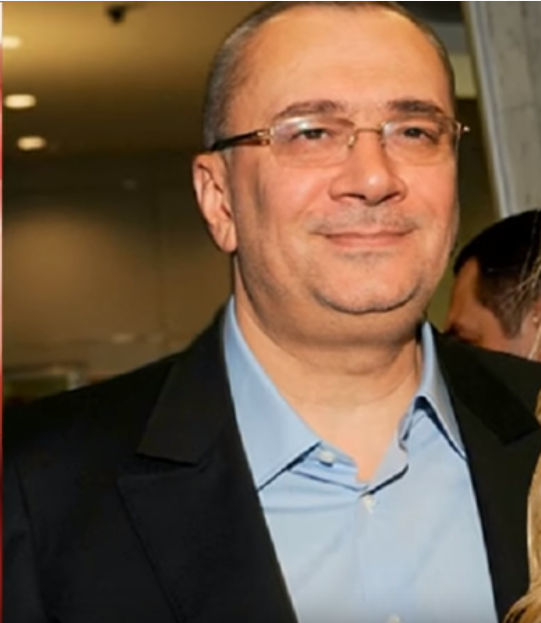
Konstantin Meladze

On August 22, 2018, Channel One announced the names of the coaches. Basta replaced Dima Bilan and returned for his 2nd season as a coach after a two season-break. Ani Lorak, Sergey Shnurov, and Konstantin Meladze replaced Pelageya, Alexander Gradsky, and Leonid Agutin as new coaches for the show.

Dmitry Nagiyev returned for his 7th season as a presenter.

== Teams ==
Colour key

- Winner
- Runner-up
- Third place
- Fourth place
- Eliminated in the Semifinal
- Eliminated in the Quarterfinal
- Stolen in the Knockout rounds
- Eliminated in the Knockout rounds
- Eliminated in the Battle rounds

Coaches	Top 48 artists				
Basta					
Basta	Shaen Oganesyan	Andrey Polyakov	Darya Shigina	Ksena Ivanova	Konstantin Biteev
Basta	Karina Arbelyani	Alexandra Zakharik	Sergey Lamas	Anna Pingina	Laura Plenkina
Basta	Yury Pak	Valeria Bugorskaya	Sergey Arutyunov		
Ani Lorak					
Ani Lorak	Amirkhan Umaev	Uku Suviste	Sofia Legran	~~Daniel Rustamov~~	Olga Shitova
Ani Lorak	Thomas Grazioso	Tatyana Paradnaya	Arina Bagaryakova	Taymuraz Khadartsev	Arpi Abkaryan
Ani Lorak	Valery Anokhin	Alexandra Kruglova	Oleg Shaumarov		
Sergey Shnurov					
Sergey Shnurov	Rushana Valieva	Daniel Rustamov	Annagazel Gokinaeva	~~Tatyana Shabanova~~	~~Shaen Oganesyan~~
Sergey Shnurov	~~Sofia Legran~~	Daria Grossman	Jack Gypsy	Iliana Sanchez	Rita Kron
Sergey Shnurov	Taina Souers	Marianna Georgiadu	Sergey Mushta		
Konstantin Meladze					
Konstantin Meladze	Petr Zakharov	Sofia Tarasova	Tatyana Shabanova	Yuliana Belyaeva	Valerio Sgargi
Konstantin Meladze	Marzhana Makisheva	Levan Kbilashvili	Lusia Znamenskaya	Ekaterina Korotkova	Svetlana Zhavoronkova
Konstantin Meladze	Narek Gevorgyan	Grigoriy Zalezhnev	Ruslan Umkhanov		
Note: Italicized names are stolen contestans (names struck through within former names).

== Blind auditions ==
A new feature this season is The Best coach of the season (also in each episode).

Colour key

✔	Coach pressed "I WANT YOU" button
	Artist defaulted to a coach's team
	Artist picked a coach's team
	Artist eliminated with no coach pressing their button

The coaches performed "Live is Life" at the start of the show.

Episode	Order	Artist	Age	Origin	Song	Coach's and artist's choices			
Episode	Order	Artist	Age	Origin	Song	Basta	Lorak	Shnurov	Meladze
Episode 1 (Note: Sergey Shnurov is The best coach of episode 1.) (October 12)	1	Darya Shigina	21	Kineshma, Ivanovo oblast	"Heaven"	✔	✔	✔	✔
Episode 1 (October 12)	2	Taymuraz Khadartsev	32	Vladikavkaz, North Ossetia	"Три года ты мне снилась"	✔	✔	—	—
Episode 1 (October 12)	3	Agnessa Koroleva	27	Nizhny Tagil, Sverdlovsk oblast	"Roar"	—	—	—	—
Episode 1 (October 12)	4	Sergey Mushta	31	Vyksa, Nizhny Novgorod oblast	"Как жаль"	✔	✔	✔	—
Episode 1 (October 12)	5	Annagazel Gokinaeva	26	Minsk, Belarus	"Feel It Still"	✔	—	✔	—
Episode 1 (October 12)	6	Sergey Druzhkov	30	Kovrov, Vladimir oblast	"I Wish"	—	—	—	—
Episode 1 (October 12)	7	Alexandra Stepanova	26	Minsk, Belarus	"Ты дарила мне розы"	—	—	—	—
Episode 1 (October 12)	8	Sofia Tarasova	17	St. Petersburg	"I'm Your Baby Tonight"	✔	✔	✔	✔
Episode 1 (October 12)	9	Karina Arbelyani	30	Snizhne, Ukraine	"Нет, мой милый"	✔	—	✔	—
Episode 1 (October 12)	10	Sergey Lamas	33	Nizhny Novgorod / Krasnodar	"Thinking Out Loud"	✔	—	—	—
Episode 1 (October 12)	11	Oskar Takhaviev	39	Kazan, Tatarstan	"Mas que nada"	—	—	—	—
Episode 1 (October 12)	12	Svetlana Zhavoronkova	29	Moscow	"Усталое такси"	—	—	—	✔
Episode 2 (Note: Basta is The best coach of episode 2.) (October 19)	1	Jack Gypsy	29	Artemisa, Cuba	"Smoke on the Water"	✔	—	✔	—
Episode 2 (October 19)	2	Alexandra Zakharik	29	Minsk, Belarus	"Ты глядел на меня"	✔	—	✔	✔
Episode 2 (October 19)	3	Amirkhan Umaev	27	Grozny, Chechnya	"Miserere"	✔	✔	—	—
Episode 2 (October 19)	4	Laura Plenkina	28	Moscow	"Hit 'em Up Style"	✔	✔	✔	✔
Episode 2 (October 19)	5	Ekaterina Korotkova	17	Voronezh, Voronezh oblast	"Hava Nagila"	—	✔	—	✔
Episode 2 (October 19)	6	Eldar Babaev	33	Samarkand, Uzbekistan	"Сука-любовь"	—	—	—	—
Episode 2 (October 19)	7	Taina Souers	31	Moscow	"Hallelujah I Love Her So"	✔	✔	✔	✔
Episode 2 (October 19)	8	Anna Vorfolomeeva	30	Volgograd, Volgograd oblast	"Ветер знает"	—	—	—	—
Episode 2 (October 19)	9	Vladislav Korolev	24	Novosibirsk, Novosibirsk oblast	"I'm Not the Only One"	—	—	—	—
Episode 2 (October 19)	10	Lusia Znamenskaya	31	Chișinău, Moldova	"Любовь – волшебная страна"	—	—	✔	✔
Episode 2 (October 19)	11	Arina Bagaryakova	17	Ekaterinburg, Sverdlovsk oblast	"Yesterday"	—	✔	—	—
Episode 3 (Note: Konstantin Meladze is The best coach of episode 3.) (October 26)	1	Evgenia Otradnaya	32	Korolev, Moscow oblast	"Звенит январская вьюга"	—	—	—	—
Episode 3 (October 26)	2	Shaen Oganesyan	27	St. Petersburg	"I've Got a Woman"	✔	✔	✔	—
Episode 3 (October 26)	3	"Vasily Pupkin"	28	Chelyabinsk, Chelyabinsk oblast	"Got My Mind Set on You"	—	—	—	—
Episode 3 (October 26)	4	Anastasia Martynova	23	St. Petersburg	"Ты не стал судьбой"	—	—	—	—
Episode 3 (October 26)	5	Anna Pingina	40	Moscow / Tokyo, Japan	"Говорила мне бабка лютая"	✔	—	✔	✔
Episode 3 (October 26)	6	Valerio Sgargi	38	Milan, Italy	"I've Got You Under My Skin"	—	✔	—	✔
Episode 3 (October 26)	7	Natalia Larionova	22	Tomsk, Tomsk oblast	"Обними меня"	—	—	—	—
Episode 3 (October 26)	8	Rushana Valieva	19	Tolbazy, Bashkortostan	"Пообiцяй менi"	✔	✔	✔	✔
Episode 3 (October 26)	9	Olga Shitova	27	Pyt-Yakh, Yugra	"I Wanna Dance"	—	✔	—	—
Episode 3 (October 26)	10	Valery Anokhin	55	Moscow	"Синева, пустота, тишина"	—	✔	—	—
Episode 3 (October 26)	11	Konstantin Biteev	25	St. Petersburg	"When We Were Young"	✔	—	—	—
Episode 3 (October 26)	12	Alexandra Kruglova	23	Moscow	"If I Were a Boy"	—	✔	—	—
Episode 4 (Note: Konstantin Meladze is The best coach of episode 4.) (November 2)	1	Yuliana Belyaeva	29	Minsk, Belarus	"They Won't Go When I Go"	✔	✔	✔	✔
Episode 4 (November 2)	2	Oleg Shaumarov	34	Moscow / Tashkent, Uzbekistan	"Вдвоём"	✔	✔	—	—
Episode 4 (November 2)	3	Rita Kron	27	Moscow	"It's Raining Men"	✔	✔	✔	—
Episode 4 (November 2)	4	Maksim Lidov	32	Egoryevsk, Moscow oblast	"Le temps des cathédrales"	—	—	—	—
Episode 4 (November 2)	5	Valeria Bugorskaya	19	Barnaul, Altai krai	"Каждый раз"	✔	—	—	—
Episode 4 (November 2)	6	Tatyana Paradnaya	42	Moscow / Berlin, Germany	"Private Dancer"	—	✔	—	—
Episode 4 (November 2)	7	Sergey Arkhipov	26	Novosibirsk, Novosibirsk oblast	"On the Sunny Side of the Street"	—	—	—	—
Episode 4 (November 2)	8	Tatyana Shabanova	23	Engels, Saratov oblast	"Индиго"	✔	✔	✔	✔
Episode 4 (November 2)	9	Natalya Pugacheva	23	Voronezh, Voronezh oblast	"В кейптаунском порту"	—	—	—	—
Episode 4 (November 2)	10	Uku Suviste	36	Tallinn, Estonia	"Perfect"	—	✔	✔	—
Episode 4 (November 2)	11	Nika Gavrilova	27	St. Petersburg	"Место для шага вперёд"	—	—	—	—
Episode 4 (November 2)	12	Arpi Abkaryan	25	Sochi, Krasnodar krai	"Dangerous Woman"	✔	✔	—	—
Episode 5 (Note: Konstantin Meladze is The best coach of episode 5.) (November 9)	1	Petr Zakharov	38	St. Petersburg	"Смуглянка"	✔	—	✔	✔
Episode 5 (November 9)	2	Iliana Sanchez	25	Holguín, Cuba	"Yo Vivire"	—	—	✔	—
Episode 5 (November 9)	3	Sergey Arutyunov	32	Moscow	"Send Me an Angel"	✔	✔	✔	✔
Episode 5 (November 9)	4	Veronika Danilova	48	Elektrostal, Moscow oblast	"Дельфины"	—	—	—	—
Episode 5 (November 9)	5	Marzhana Makisheva	30	Moscow / Jezkazgan, Kazakhstan	"Love on the Brain"	✔	✔	—	✔
Episode 5 (November 9)	6	Viktor Ivanov	30	Bataysk, Rostov oblast	"Выхода нет"	—	—	—	—
Episode 5 (November 9)	7	Ksena Ivanova	33	Moscow	"Отпусти меня"	✔	—	✔	—
Episode 5 (November 9)	8	Daniel Rustamov	23	Dushanbe, Tajikistan	"Versace on the Floor"	✔	✔	✔	—
Episode 5 (November 9)	9	Levan Kbilashvili	27	Tbilisi, Georgia	"Patara gogo" / "Turfa"	—	—	—	✔
Episode 5 (November 9)	10	Anastasia Zakharova	31	St. Petersburg	"Городок"	—	—	—	—
Episode 5 (November 9)	11	Sona Dunoyan	21	Masis, Armenia	"Ciao Adios"	—	—	—	—
Episode 5 (November 9)	12	Andrey Polyakov	32	Vologda, Vologda oblast	"Dazed and Confused"	✔	—	✔	—
Episode 6 (Note: Konstantin Meladze is The best coach of episode 6.) (November 16)	1	Anastasia Prokosheva	25	Glazov, Udmurtia	"Hora din Moldova"	—	—	—	—
Episode 6 (November 16)	2	Narek Gevorgyan	28	Krasnodar, Krasnodar krai	"Я не могу без тебя"	—	—	✔	✔
Episode 6 (November 16)	3	Sofia Legran	21	Sochi, Krasnodar krai	"Love Me Again"	✔	✔	✔	✔
Episode 6 (November 16)	4	Valentin Khmelev	26	Surgut, Yugra	"Что так сердце растревожено"	—	—	—	—
Episode 6 (November 16)	5	Thomas Grazioso	33	Rome, Italy	"Every Breath You Take"	✔	✔	✔	✔
Episode 6 (November 16)	6	Daria Grossman	17	Petrozavodsk, Karelia	"Stronger Than Me"	✔	Team full	✔	—
Episode 6 (November 16)	7	Svetlana Afanasyeva	20	Tula, Tula oblast	"Драмы больше нет"	—	Team full	—	—
Episode 6 (November 16)	8	Yury Pak	19	Moscow	"Gangnam Style"	✔	Team full	—	—
Episode 6 (November 16)	9	Radmira Yakubova	22	Moscow	"Rehab"	Team full	Team full	—	—
Episode 6 (November 16)	10	Ruslan Umkhanov	23	Tolstoy-Yurt, Chechnya	"Here Without You"	Team full	Team full	—	✔
Episode 6 (November 16)	11	Marianna Georgiadu	26	Thessaloniki, Greece	"Шопен"	Team full	Team full	✔	—
Episode 6 (November 16)	12	Grigoriy Zalezhnev	26	St. Petersburg	"Rebel Yell"	Team full	Team full	Team full	✔

== The Battles ==
The Battle Rounds started on November 23. For the second time in the series' history the coaches can't steal two losing artists from other coaches. Contestants who win their battle will advance to the Knockout rounds.

Colour key

Artist won the Battle and advanced to the Knockouts
Artist lost the Battle and was eliminated

Episode	Coach	Order	Winner	Song	Loser
Episode 7 (November 23) (Note: Sergey Shnurov is The best coach of episode 7.)	Konstantin Meladze	1	Valerio Sgargi	"Torna a Surriento"	Ruslan Umkhanov
Episode 7 (November 23)	Basta	2	Darya Shigina	"We Will Rock You" / "I Love Rock 'n' Roll"	Sergey Arutyunov
Episode 7 (November 23)	Sergey Shnurov	3	Rushana Valieva	"Наше лето"	Sergey Mushta
Episode 7 (November 23)	Ani Lorak	4	Daniel Rustamov	"Believer"	Oleg Shaumarov
Episode 7 (November 23)	Basta	5	Alexandra Zakharik	"Плохо танцевать"	Valeria Bugorskaya
Episode 7 (November 23)	Konstantin Meladze	6	Yuliana Belyaeva	"Beat It"	Grigoriy Zalezhnev
Episode 7 (November 23)	Sergey Shnurov	7	Annagozel Gokinaeva	"Старый отель"	Taina Sauers
Episode 7 (November 23)	Ani Lorak	8	Uku Suviste	"Love Runs Out"	Alexandra Kruglova
Episode 7 (November 23)	Sergey Shnurov	9	Shaen Oganesyan	"Не плачь"	Marianna Georgiadu
Episode 7 (November 23)	Konstantin Meladze	10	Levan Kbilashvili	"Махинджи вар"	Narek Gevorgyan
Episode 7 (November 23)	Ani Lorak	11	Tatyana Paradnaya	"Мой первый день без тебя"	Valeriy Anokhin
Episode 7 (November 23)	Basta	12	Andrey Polyakov	"Это всё..."	Yury Pak
Episode 8 (November 30) (Note: Sergey Shnurov is The best coach of episode 8.)	Sergey Shnurov	1	Daria Grossman	"Стюардесса по имени Жанна"	Rita Kron
Episode 8 (November 30)	Basta	2	Konstantin Biteev	""Perfect Duet" version"	Laura Plenkina
Episode 8 (November 30)	Konstantin Meladze	3	Marzhana Makisheva	"Purple Rain"	Svetlana Zhavoronkova
Episode 8 (November 30)	Ani Lorak	4	Amirkhan Umaev	"Беги по небу"	Arpi Abkaryan
Episode 8 (November 30)	Sergey Shnurov	5	Tatyana Shabanova	"Bang Bang"	Iliana Sanchez
Episode 8 (November 30)	Ani Lorak	6	Olga Shitova	"Жить в твоей голове"	Taymuraz Khadartsev
Episode 8 (November 30)	Basta	7	Karina Arbelyani	"Otherwise"	Anna Pingina
Episode 8 (November 30)	Konstantin Meladze	8	Sofia Tarasova	"Обiйми"	Ekaterina Korotkova
Episode 8 (November 30)	Sergey Shnurov	9	Sofia Legran	"I Don't Want to Miss a Thing"	Jack Gypsy
Episode 8 (November 30)	Basta	10	Ksena Ivanova	"Лето без тебя"	Sergey Lamas
Episode 8 (November 30)	Ani Lorak	11	Thomas Grazioso	"Set Fire to the Rain"	Arina Bagaryakova
Episode 8 (November 30)	Konstantin Meladze	12	Petr Zakharov	"Давай присядем и поговорим"	Lusia Znamenskaya

== The Knockouts ==
The Knockout Rounds started on December 7. Each coach pairs three artists into one knockout with only one contestant from the trio advances to the next round. But the coaches for the first time in the show's history on this stage can steal one losing artist from another coach. The top 12 contestants will then move on to the Quarterfinal.

Colour key

Artist won the Knockout and advanced to the Quarterfinal
Artist lost the Knockout but was stolen by another coach and advanced to the Quarterfinal
Artist lost the Knockout and was eliminated

Episode	Coach	Order	Song	Artists		Song	'Steal' result			
Episode	Coach	Order	Song	Winner	Losers	Song	Basta	Lorak	Shnurov	Meladze
Episode 9 (December 7) (Note: Sergey Shnurov is The best coach of episode 9.)	Konstantin Meladze	1	"Love Story"	Petr Zakharov	Marzhana Makisheva	"До свидания, мама!"	—	—	—	—N/a
Episode 9 (December 7)	Konstantin Meladze	1	"Love Story"	Petr Zakharov	Levan Kbilashvili	"Очарована, околдована"	—	—	—	—N/a
Episode 9 (December 7)	Sergey Shnurov	2	"Мало половин"	Rushana Valieva	Shaen Oganesyan	"Полёт на дельтаплане"	✔	—	—N/a	—
Episode 9 (December 7)	Sergey Shnurov	2	"Мало половин"	Rushana Valieva	Sofia Legran	"Shallow"	Team full	✔	—N/a	—
Episode 9 (December 7)	Ani Lorak	3	"I'm Not the Only One"	Uku Suviste	Tatyana Paradnaya	"Whatever Lola Wants"	Team full	Team full	—	—
Episode 9 (December 7)	Ani Lorak	3	"I'm Not the Only One"	Uku Suviste	Daniel Rustamov	"Лейла"	Team full	Team full	✔	—
Episode 9 (December 7)	Basta	4	"Knockin' on Heaven's Door"	Andrey Polyakov	Alexandra Zakharik	"Down on My Knees"	Team full	Team full	Team full	—
Episode 9 (December 7)	Basta	4	"Knockin' on Heaven's Door"	Andrey Polyakov	Karina Arbelyani	"Что я тебе сделала"	Team full	Team full	Team full	—
Episode 10 (December 14) (Note: Sergey Shnurov is The best coach of episode 10.)	Basta	1	"Снег"	Darya Shigina	Konstantin Biteev	"Моё сердце"	Team full	Team full	Team full	—
Episode 10 (December 14)	Basta	1	"Снег"	Darya Shigina	Ksena Ivanova	"Killing Me Softly with His Song"	Team full	Team full	Team full	—
Episode 10 (December 14)	Sergey Shnurov	2	"Розовый фламинго"	Annagozel Gokinaeva	Daria Grossman	"Girl, You'll Be a Woman Soon"	Team full	Team full	Team full	—
Episode 10 (December 14)	Sergey Shnurov	2	"Розовый фламинго"	Annagozel Gokinaeva	Tatyana Shabanova	"Новый герой"	Team full	Team full	Team full	✔
Episode 10 (December 14)	Ani Lorak	3	"Я вернусь"	Amirkhan Umaev	Olga Shitova	"Плакала"	Team full	Team full	Team full	Team full
Episode 10 (December 14)	Ani Lorak	3	"Я вернусь"	Amirkhan Umaev	Tomas Grazioso	"Ja tebia liubliu"	Team full	Team full	Team full	Team full
Episode 10 (December 14)	Konstantin Meladze	4	"Ты отпусти"	Sofia Tarasova	Yuliana Belyaeva	"Lullaby of Birdland"	Team full	Team full	Team full	Team full
Episode 10 (December 14)	Konstantin Meladze	4	"Ты отпусти"	Sofia Tarasova	Valerio Sgargi	"Shake a Tail Feather"	Team full	Team full	Team full	Team full

== Live shows ==
Colour key:

Artist was saved
Artist was eliminated

=== Week 1: Top 12 — Quarterfinal (December 21) ===
The Live Top 12 Quarterfinal comprised episode 11. The top twelve artists performed, with two artists from each team advancing based on the sum of the viewers' and coach's votes.

Episode	Coach	Order	Artist	Song	Coach's vote (/100%)	Public's vote (/100%)	Votes' sum	Result
Episode 11 (December 21) (Note: Sergey Shnurov is The best coach of episode 11.)	Basta	1	Shaen Oganesyan	"Livin' la Vida Loca"	20%	53.5%	73.5%	Advanced
Episode 11 (December 21)	Basta	2	Darya Shigina	"Медуза"	30%	24.5%	54.5%	Eliminated
Episode 11 (December 21)	Basta	3	Andrey Polyakov	"Олимпиада-80"	50%	22%	72%	Advanced
Episode 11 (December 21)	Ani Lorak	4	Sofia Legrand	"Я пою"	20%	16.2%	36.2%	Eliminated
Episode 11 (December 21)	Ani Lorak	5	Uku Suviste	"Кеды"	50%	10.9%	60.9%	Advanced
Episode 11 (December 21)	Ani Lorak	6	Amirkhan Umaev	"Nessun dorma"	30%	72.9%	102.9%	Advanced
Episode 11 (December 21)	Konstantin Meladze	7	Tatyana Shabanova	"Малыш"	20%	7.3%	27.3%	Eliminated
Episode 11 (December 21)	Konstantin Meladze	8	Sofia Tarasova	"Американская жена"	30%	23.7%	53.7%	Advanced
Episode 11 (December 21)	Konstantin Meladze	9	Petr Zakharov	"Две гитары"	50%	69%	119%	Advanced
Episode 11 (December 21)	Sergey Shnurov	10	Daniel Rustamov	"Natural"	20%	37%	57%	Advanced
Episode 11 (December 21)	Sergey Shnurov	11	Rushana Valieva	"Прыгну со скалы"	50%	43.7%	93.7%	Advanced
Episode 11 (December 21)	Sergey Shnurov	12	Annagazel Gokinaeva	"I Shot the Sheriff"	30%	19.3%	49.3%	Eliminated

=== Week 2: Top 8 — Semifinal (December 28) ===
The top eight artists performed on December 28, 2018, with one artist from each team advancing to the Final based on the sum of the viewers' and coach's votes.

Episode	Coach	Order	Artist	Song	Coach's vote (/100%)	Public's vote (/100%)	Votes' sum	Result
Episode 12 (December 28) (Note: Sergey Shnurov is The best coach of episode 12.)	Sergey Shnurov	1	Daniel Rustamov	"Treasure"	40%	30.1%	70.1%	Eliminated
Episode 12 (December 28)	Sergey Shnurov	2	Rushana Valieva	"Ариведерчи"	60%	69.9%	129.9%	Advanced
Episode 12 (December 28)	Ani Lorak	3	Amirkhan Umaev	"Con te partirò"	60%	81.3%	141.3%	Advanced
Episode 12 (December 28)	Ani Lorak	4	Uku Suviste	"You Raise Me Up"	40%	18.7%	58.7%	Eliminated
Episode 12 (December 28)	Basta	5	Andrey Polyakov	"Евпатория"	40%	29.4%	69.4%	Eliminated
Episode 12 (December 28)	Basta	6	Shaen Oganesyan	"Вахтёрам"	60%	70.6%	130.6%	Advanced
Episode 12 (December 28)	Konstantin Meladze	7	Sofia Tarasova	"We Are the World"	40%	34.4%	74.4%	Eliminated
Episode 12 (December 28)	Konstantin Meladze	8	Petr Zakharov	"The World We Knew"	60%	65.6%	125.6%	Advanced

Trios
Order	Performer	Song
12.1	Philipp Kirkorov, Daniel Rustamov, and Rushana Valieva	"Цвет настроения синий"
12.2	A-Studio, Amirkhan Umaev, and Uku Suviste	"Песенка про меня"
12.3	Aya, Andrey Polyakov, and Shaen Oganesyan	"Останусь"
12.4	Valery Meladze, Sofia Tarasova, and Petr Zakharov	"Красиво"

=== Week 3: Final (January 1) ===
The Top 4 artists performed on January 1, 2019. This week, the four finalists performed two solo cover songs and a duet with their coach.

Coach	Artist	Order	Duet Song (with Coach)	Order	Solo Song (no.1)	Order	Solo Song (no.2)	Result	
Basta	Shaen Oganesyan	1	"Stay"	5	"Чистые пруды"	Eliminated		Fourth Place	
Ani Lorak	Amirkhan Umaev	2	"Верни мою любовь"	6	"Il mondo"	9	"Мама"	45.9%	Runner-up
Sergey Shnurov	Rushana Valieva	3	"Мой голос"	7	"Город золотой"	10	"Toxic"	Third Place	
Konstantin Meladze	Petr Zakharov	4	"Опять метель"	8	"Русское поле"	11	"Останься"	54.1%	Winner

Non-competition performances
Order	Performer	Song
13.1	Shaen Oganesyan, Amirkhan Umaev, Rushana Valieva, and Petr Zakharov	"Новый Год мы встретим с тобой"
13.2	Shaen Oganesyan	"Let It Snow"
13.3	Petr Zakharov (winner)	"Смуглянка"
13.4	Top 48 artists	"Здесь проигравших нет"

== Best Coach ==
Colour key

- Best Coach
- Second place
- Third place
- Fourth place
- Episode's Best Coach

Coach	Public's vote _{(per episode)}													Result
Coach	#1	#2	#3	#4	#5	#6	#7	#8	#9	#10	#11	#12	Av.	Result
Sergey Shnurov	30%	28%	27%	26%	25%	24%	38%	37%	40%	43%	46%	48%	34%	Best Coach
Konstantin Meladze	29%	25%	32%	35%	40%	42%	30%	29%	29%	27%	25%	23%	30%	Second place
Basta	28%	35%	30%	27%	27%	24%	23%	24%	21%	19%	17%	17%	24%	Third place
Ani Lorak	13%	12%	11%	12%	8%	10%	9%	10%	10%	11%	12%	12%	12%	Fourth place

== Reception ==
=== Rating ===
Episode		Original airdate	Production	Time slot (UTC+3)	Audience		Source
Episode		Original airdate	Production	Time slot (UTC+3)	Rating	Share	Source
1	"The Blind Auditions Premiere"	October 12, 2018	701	Friday 9:30 p.m.	5.2	18.6	
2	"The Blind Auditions, Part 2"	October 19, 2018	702	Friday 9:30 p.m.	4.7	16.8	
3	"The Blind Auditions, Part 3"	October 26, 2018	703	Friday 9:30 p.m.	4.9	17.6	
4	"The Blind Auditions, Part 4"	November 2, 2018	704	Friday 9:30 p.m.	5.2	18.3	
5	"The Blind Auditions, Part 5"	November 9, 2018	705	Friday 9:30 p.m.	5.9	20.4	
6	"The Blinds End"	November 16, 2018	706	Friday 9:30 p.m.	5.5	18.4	
7	"The Battles Premiere"	November 23, 2018	707	Friday 9:30 p.m.	4.7	17.2	
8	"The Battles, Part 2"	November 30, 2018	708	Friday 9:30 p.m.	4.5	15.8	
9	"The Knockouts Premiere"	December 7, 2018	709	Friday 9:30 p.m.	4.7	16.4	
10	"The Knockouts, Part 2"	December 14, 2018	710	Friday 9:30 p.m.	4.5	14.7	
11	"Live Top 12 Quarterfinal"	December 21, 2018	711	Friday 9:30 p.m.	4.3	14.1	
12	"Live Top 8 Semifinal"	December 28, 2018	712	Friday 9:30 p.m.	3.9	13.4	
13	"Live Season Final"	January 1, 2019	713	Tuesday 8:00 p.m.	5.3	16.1	
