= Fenix (Alexander Mamonov) =

Russian DJ and producer (born 1986)

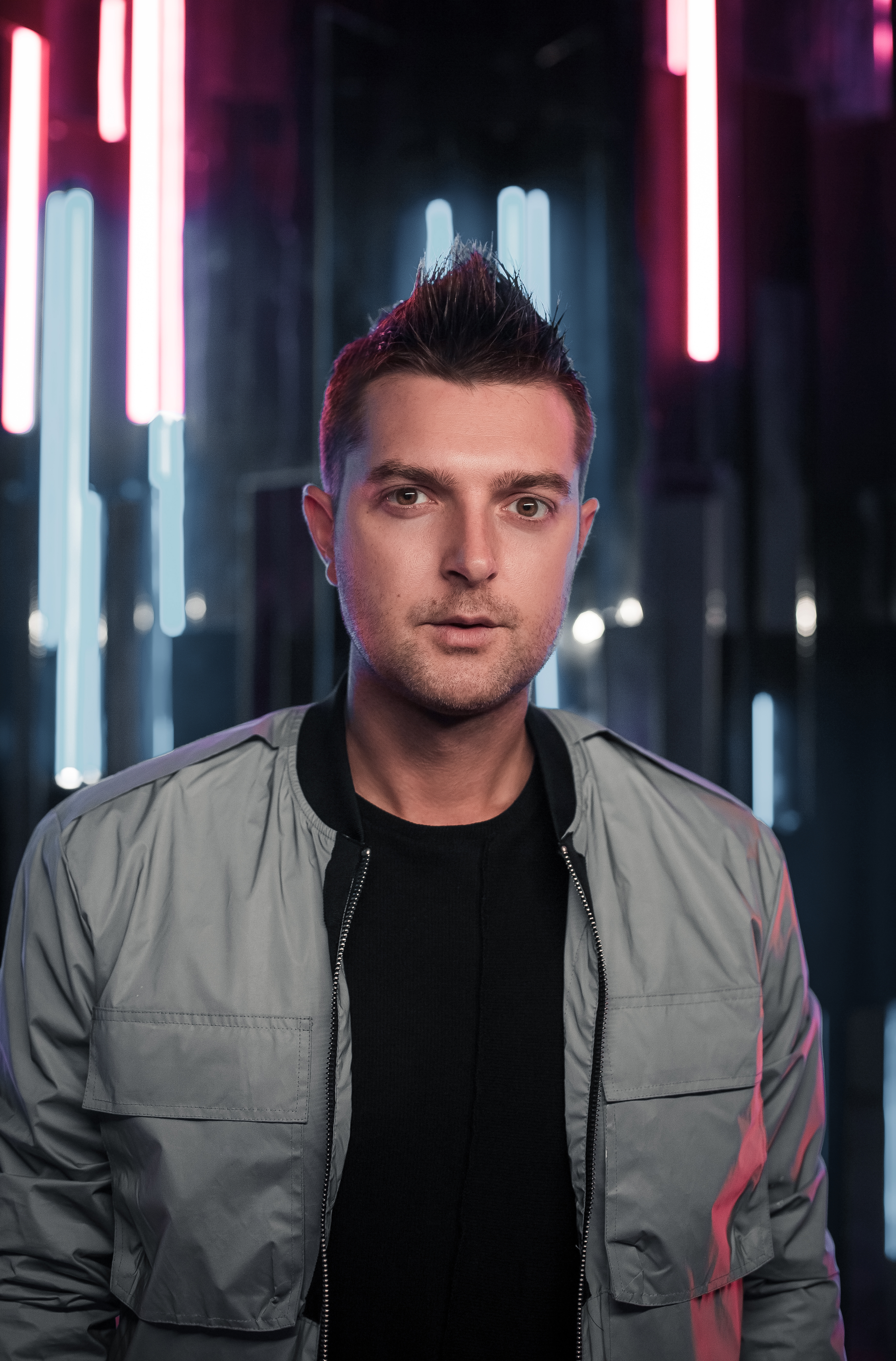
- Fenix in 2019
- Born: Alexander Mamonov; 5 July 1986 (age 39); Moscow, Russia
- Other name: Fenix
- Occupations: DJ; producer; musician
- Years active: 2004–present
- Musical career
- Genres: Progressive house; Big room house; EDM; house; progressive house; electro house; dance-pop
- Instruments: Digital audio workstation; guitar
- Labels: Carrillo Music; Say Wow Records; Say Wow Music
- Website: djfenix.com

Fenix aka DJ Fenix (Real Name: Alexander Mamonov) (born 5 July 1986) is a house music and electronic dance music deejay, producer and musician, born and raised in Moscow, Russia. In 2017, Fenix won the Remix of The Year Award for his remix of Justin Timberlake's "Can't Stop the Feeling". Fenix is the first electronic dance music deejay to perform at the Kremlin in Moscow.

== Early life ==
Alexander Mamonov was born in 1986 and grew up in Moscow (Russia) in a military family. During his youth, Alexander was in the volleyball team at school, ultimately gaining a spot at the youth Olympic volleyball team of Russia. He left his volleyball team, once he decided to dedicate himself to music. His musical style was influenced by the music that his father used to listened to.

Inspired by hip-hop and classic rock, he became interested in Moscow electronic music. When he turned 16, he began his career as a DJ at a local club. Afterwards, he started performing in the city.

== Career ==
=== 2004–06: Moscow club scene ===
Fenix began his career playing in Moscow clubs in 2004, later on he collaborated with British dance duo Supafly.

=== 2007–09: Supafly – I Believe ===
Together with Supafly he recorded and released his first international single "I Believe" in 2007. The single charted and aired on radio in the US, Australia, Germany and UK.

=== 2010–13: Best DJ Award and touring ===
In 2012, Fenix received the Best DJ award at the Music Entertainment Awards. He resumed his live performances for the next few years, sharing stage with David Guetta and Bob Sinclar.

=== 2014–16: Kremlin and Music Box Award ===
In November 2014, Fenix was the first EDM musician to perform live in the Kremlin as an introductory act at the 2014 Musicbox Awards ceremony, where he received a Best DJ award. Fenix made his US debut which led to the release of his first single Cosmo Zoo in the US. Before the release of the album, he made a New York tour in January 2015. On 16 February 2015 "Cosmo Zoo" debuted in 11th place on the chart of Beatport Progressive House. He followed the single with the release of "Eternity" in April 2015.

In April 2016, Fenix released "Satellite" with the participation of Frankie. This track was the second single by Fenix on Carrillo Music, aired on Y100 radio station Miami, FM. Then he released Justin Timberlake's remix of "Can't Stop the Feeling" which ended up trending # 1 at New York's 103.5 KTU music station for three weeks, ranking in the top 30 remixes by Shawn Hamilton.

=== 2017–present: All Around the World ===
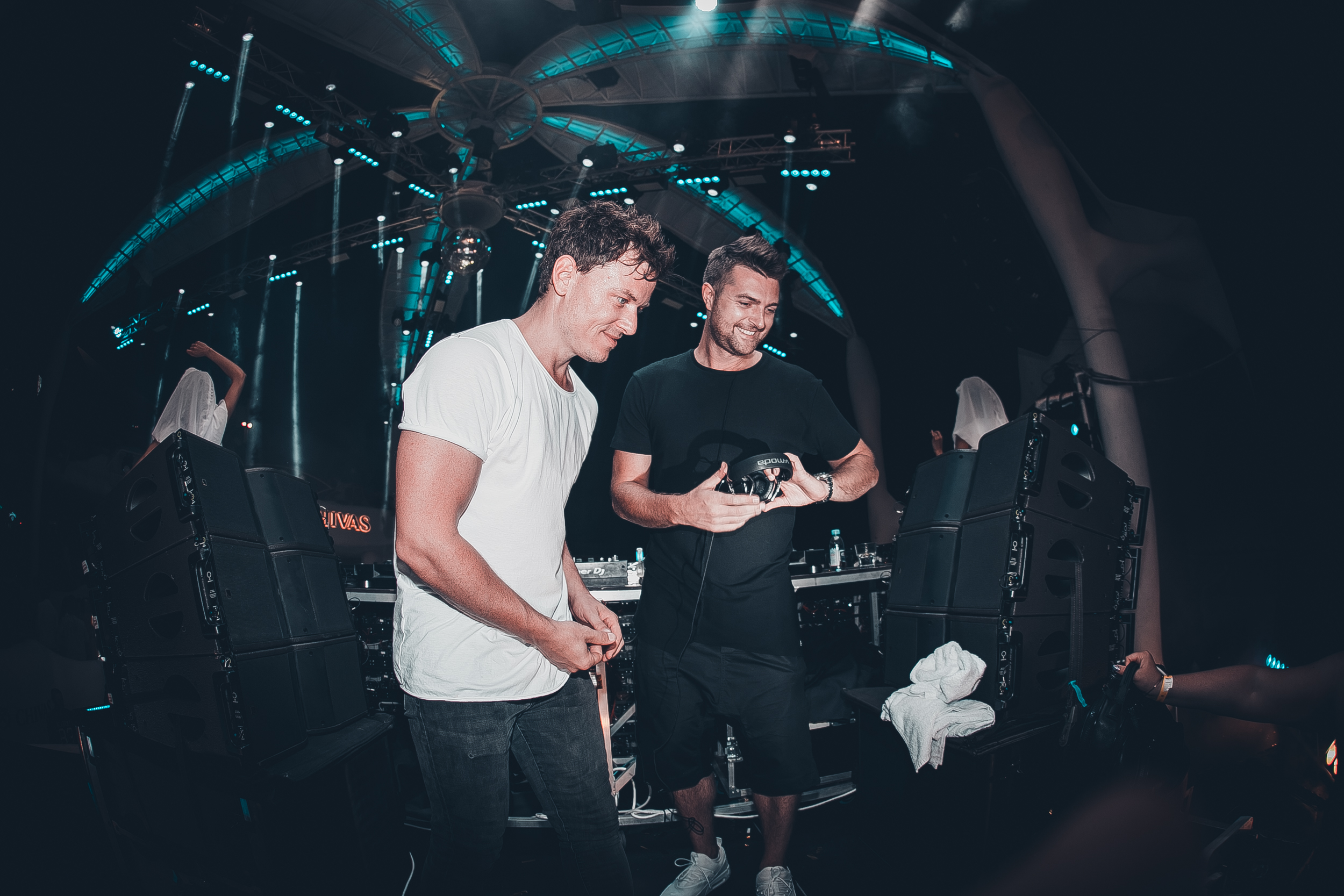
Fenix and Dj Fedde Le Grand

In March 2017, Mamonov released his next single, All Around the World, dedicated to Chris Casino on Spotify, iTunes and Beatport. In the same month, Fenix performed at the 2nd Annual Remix Awards 2017 which is a part of the 2017 Miami Music Week.

Mamonov performs mostly for Western audiences in the United States and Europe. He explained this fact by the difficulties of conducting his professional activity in Russia for EDM musicians and lack of opportunities in distribution of their work through popular services such as Spotify, Pandora and SoundCloud, since these services are blocked in his country.

== Personal life ==
He released an app in 2007 titled "You Can be a DJ," to assist young DJs.

== Awards and nominations ==
Year	Awards	Category	Recipient	Outcome	Ref.
2012	Music Entertainment Awards	Best DJ	DJ Fenix	Won	
2013	VKLUBE TV Awards	Best DJ	DJ Fenix	Won	
2013	Musicbox Awards	Best DJ	DJ Fenix	Nominated	
2014	Musicbox Awards	Best DJ	DJ Fenix	Won	
2016	OOPS! Choice Awards	Best Clip	DJ Fenix and Bobo	Nominated	
2017	2017 Remix Awards	Best Bootleg	DJ Fenix	Won	
2018	M1 Music Аwards	Project of Summer	DJ Fenix	Nominated	

== Releases ==
Year	Release	Ref.
2007	Fenix – I Believe (Feat. Supafly Inc.)	
2015	Fenix – Cosmo Zoo	
2015	Fenix – The Voice Of The Earth	
2015	Fenix – Satisfied (Feat. Alicia Madison)	
2016	Fenix – Revolution	
2016	Fenix & Terri B – Groove Situation	
2016	Fenix – Satelite (Feat. Frankie C.)	
2017	Fenix – Eternity	
2017	Fenix – Drums of Life (Feat. Lion)	
2017	Fenix – All Around The World (Feat. Chris Casino)	
2017	Fenix – California Sun Feat. Lisa Williams	
2017	Fenix – Until The Break (Feat. DJ Miller)	
2018	Fenix & Reiss Harrison – Bring The World Down	
2018	Fenix – Butterfly	
2018	Fenix – Rage	
2019	Fenix – Let’s Get Down	
2019	Fenix – Train	
2019	Fenix & SM1LO Feat. LLexa – Where We Begin	
