= Dymna Sumish =

Ukrainian band

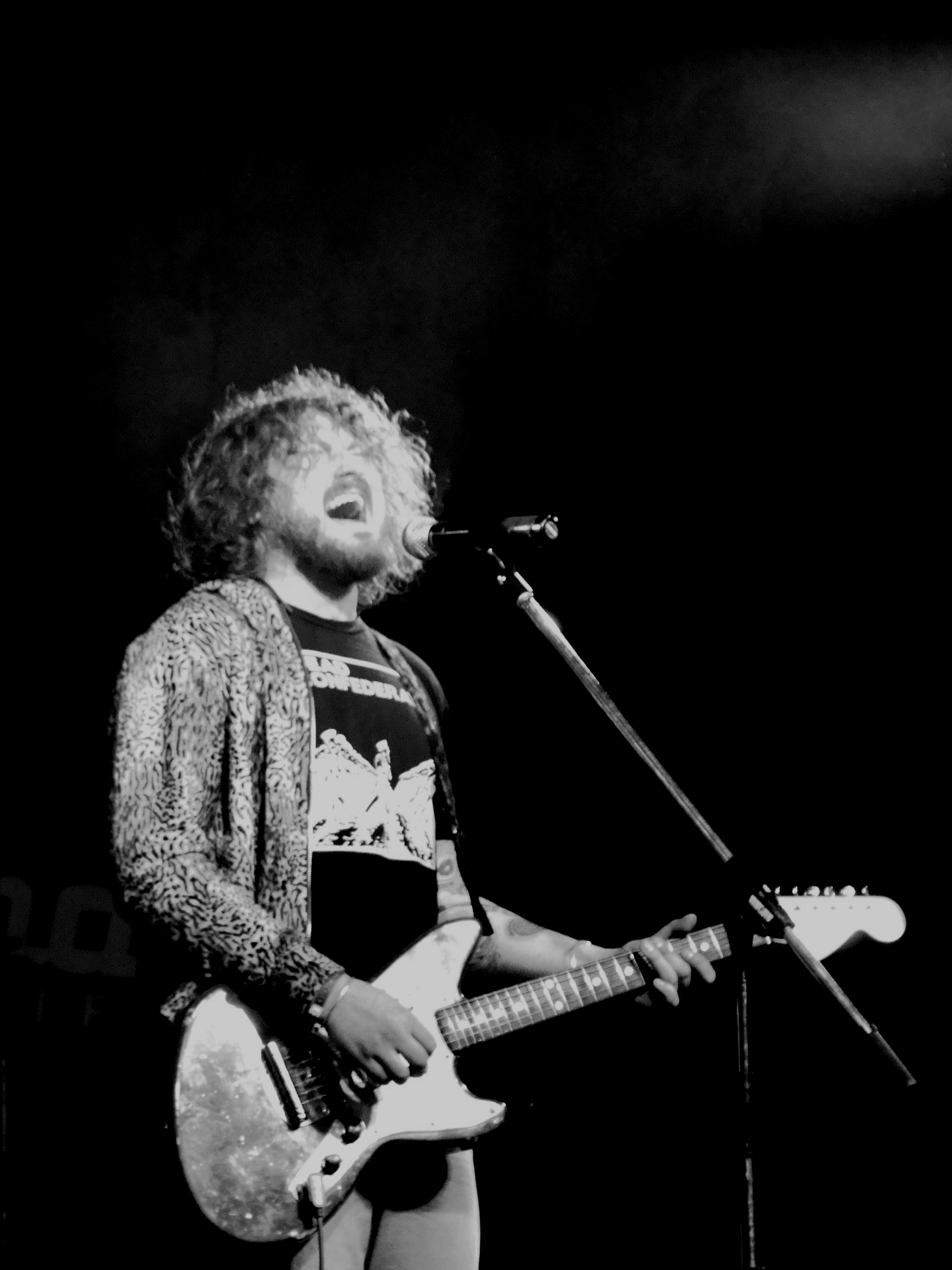
- Oleksandr Chemerov in 2012

Background information
- Origin: Chernihiv, Ukraine
- Genres: Psychedelic rock, post-grunge, hardcore punk
- Years active: 1998–2012 (hiatus)
- Past members: Oleksandr Chemerov; Serhii Martynov; Ihor Herzhyna; Oleh Fedosov

Dymna Sumish (Ukrainian: Димна Суміш) is a Ukrainian musical band. Founded on 3 December 1998 in Chernihiv, the group plays a mix of hardcore, punk and psychedelic rock. Winners of the festivals «Chervona Ruta» (Ukraine), «Pearls of the Season» (Ukraine), «Boards» (Moscow), «Woodstock» (Poland). Its name means Smoking Mix.

All members of the group are vegetarians. They openly express their opinion against violence, drugs and alcohol, trying to convey to the listeners with their music and lyrics the value of life.

In April 2012, the participants of the group said that the group temporarily stop their activity because of inability to cope with the situation in Ukraine - when a culture isn't valued, but instead all the power has policy, social experiments and "totalitarianism".

== Past members ==
- Oleksandr Chemerov - vocals, guitar, screaming
- Serhii Martynov - guitar, sitar
- Ihor Herzhyna - bass
- Oleh Fedosov - drums

== Albums ==
- Ty zhyvyi (2005) (Ти живий)
- V kraini iliuziy (2008) (В країні ілюзій)
- Dymna Sumish (2009) (Димна Суміш)

== Music videos ==
- «В Країні Ілюзій» (2007)
- «Псіходелічні Краї» (2008)
- «Вкрай Стомлений» (2008)
- «Океан» (2008)
- «Танцюй, Танцюй» (2008)
- «Кожної весни» (2009)
- «R'n'R» (2009)
- «Кращий друг самурая» (2009)
- "Карма" (2010)
