= Quest Pistols Show =

Ukrainian band

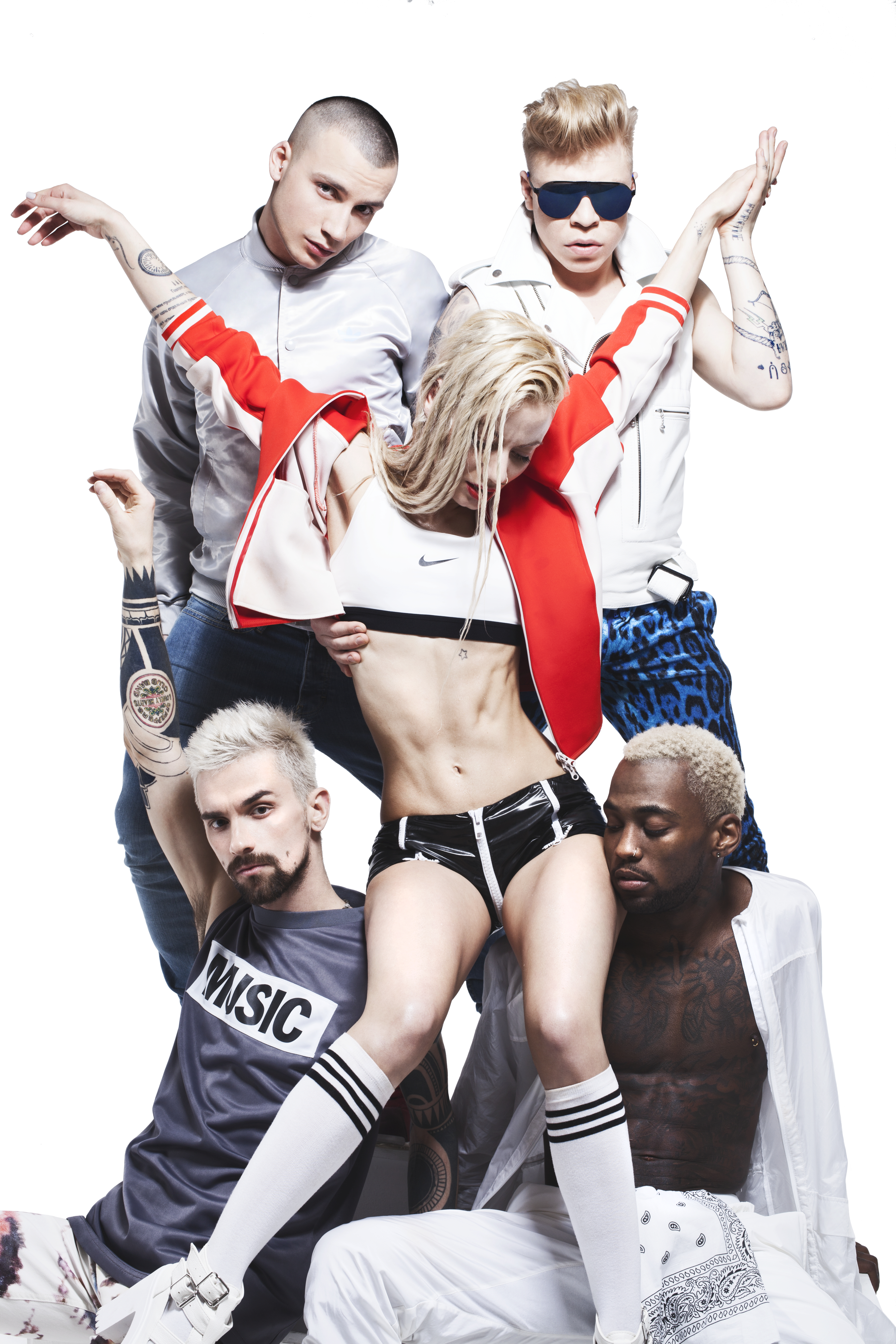
- Quest Pistols Show in 2015

Background information
- Origin: Kyiv, Ukraine
- Genres: Pop; rock; electronic; house
- Years active: 2007-present
- Labels: Kruzheva Music
- Members: Daniel Matseychuk; Washington Salles; Ivan Krishtoforenko
- Past members: Anton Savlepov; Nikita Goruk; Konstantin Borovsky; Mariam Turkmenbaeva
- Website: http://questpistols.ru

Quest Pistols Show (before 2014, Quest Pistols) are a Ukrainian boy band formed in 2007, originally consisting of Anton Savlepov (vocals, guitar), Nikita Goruk (vocals, bass), and Kostiantyn 'Kostya' Borovsky (vocals, keyboard). In 2012 Kostya left the band and was replaced by Daniel Joy. The band began as a group of dancers in a show called "Quest Ballet". On April 1, 2007 they took part as singers during the show "Chance" as an April Fools prank with the song "Я устал" and received over 60,000 positive votes. After their success, the group decided to become a band. Since their formation, the band has released the studio albums: Dlja tebja, in 2007 and Superklass in 2009; and one EP "Волшебные краски + ROCK’N'ROLL и кружева" in 2008, and now the single 'Forget Everything' in 2013 (later added to the album 'Shards of Ice'). This song marks the start of 'a new stage' of the band, completely different from the usual image. The press team commented; 'With this release, they start the next level in their musical career, it's changed not only the style of sound, but the pitch, perception, positioning, and also the choice of material.' Most recently, the band released 'Shards of Ice', which takes the band in a more electronic and synthpop direction.

In 2008 the band won the MTV Europe Music Awards 2008 as best Ukrainian Act of the year.

In 2009 the band had been touring across Ukraine, Kazakhstan, Uzbekistan, Turkey, Belarus, Latvia, Estonia and Germany.

In January 2016, Anton Savlepov and Nikita Goruk left the band and joined former Quest Pistols member Konstantin Borovsky in a new band called "Агонь".

== Discography ==
=== Studio albums ===
- 2007 - Dlja tebja (Для тебя, For you)
- 2008 - Superklass
- 2013 - Shards of Ice - unreleased album
- 2016 - Lyubimka (Любимка, My dear)

=== EPs ===
- 2008 - Volshebnyye kraski + ROCK’N'ROLL i kruzheva (Волшебные краски + ROCK’N'ROLL и кружева, Magic paints + ROCK'N'ROLL and lace)
- 2015 - Soundtrack

=== Singles ===
- 2008 - Volshebnyye Kraski (Волшебные Краски, Magic paints)
- 2013 - Zabudem vse (Забудем все, Forget Everything)
- 2015 - Mokraya (Мокрая, Wet) with MONATIK
- 2016 - Nepokhozhiye (Непохожие, Unlike)
- 2016 - Kruche vsekh (Круче всех, The coolest) feat. Open Kids
- 2018 - Ub'yu (Убью, I'll kill) feat. Constantine [Video Version]

=== Songs not included in albums ===
- 2009 - YA tvoy narkotik (Я твой наркотик, I'm your drug)
- 2009 - Revolyutsiya (Революция, Revolution)
- 2011 - Ty tak krasiva (Ты так красива, You're so beautiful)
- 2011 - Zharkiye tantsy (Жаркие танцы, Hot Dancing)
- 2011 - Ty Pokhudela (Ты Похудела, You lost weight)
- 2012 - Utomlennoye solntse (Утомленное солнце, The tired sun) feat. Lena Katina from t.A.T.u.
- 2015 - Vso pakhnet toboy (Всё пахнет тобой, Everything smells of you)
- 2017 - Ukh ty kakoy! (Ух ты какой!, Oh man!) feat. Меджикул
- 2018 - Pey voda (Пей вода, Drink water) feat. DJ Fenix

== Videography ==
=== DVDs ===
- 2008 - Party

=== Music videos ===
Title	Year	Album
"Я устал" (YA ustal, I'm tired)	2007	Для тебя
"Дни гламура" (Dni glamura, Days of glamour)	2007	Для тебя
"Для тебя" (Dlya tebya, For you)	2008	Для тебя
"Клетка" (Kletka, Cell)	2008	—
"Белая стрекоза любви" (Belaya strekoza lyubvi, White Dragonfly of love)	2009	Superklass
"Он рядом" (On ryadom, He is near)	2009	Superklass
"Я твой наркотик" (YA tvoy narkotik, I'm your drug)	2010	—
"Революция (feat. Aleksandr Revva)" (Revolyutsiya, Revolution)	2010	—
"Ты так красива" (Ty tak krasiva, You're so beautiful)	2011	—
"Ты похудела (feat. Lolita)" (Ty pokhudela, You lost weight)	2011	—
"Разные" (Raznyye, Different)	2012	—
"Забудем всё" (Zabudem vso, Forget everything)	2013	—
"Ромео" (Romeo)	2013	—
"Babyboy"	2013	—
"Жара" (Zhara, Heat)	2014	—
"Бит (feat. Secret Q)" (Bit)	2014	—
"Санта Лючия" (Santa Lyuchiya, Santa Lucia)	2014	—
"Мокрая (feat. Monatik)" (Mokraya, Wet)	2015	Звучит (Sounds)
"Пришелец" (Prishelets, The stranger)	2015	Superklass
"Непохожие" (Nepokhozhiye, Unlike)	2016	Superklass
"Круче всех (feat. Open Kids)" (Kruche vsekh, The coolest)	2016	Superklass
"Любимка" (Lyubimka, My dear)	2017	Superklass
"Ух ты какой! (feat. Меджикул)" (Ukh ty kakoy!, Oh man!)	2017	—
