= Euro Pop Contest =

The Euro Pop Contest (German: Euro Pop Contest "Berliner Perle"), often shortened to Euro Pop or EPC, is an annual song competition for young people held in Berlin, Germany by the non-profit organization Music, Accuracy and Veranstaltulgen eV since 2003.

== Origins ==
The contest was founded as "Berliner Perle" in Berlin, Germany by Viktor Leis, a former musician and producer in Russia for 30 years. Leis already realized his idea of an international singing competition for children and young people in his later years as a musician and producer in Germany, but with the increasing internationalization of his contest's organizing committee, it was renamed as Euro Pop Contest "Berliner Perle" in 2009.

== Format ==
The contest was usually held at the Russian House of Science and Culture because the venue had been the long-term supporter of the competition and was where the selection of entries which a country sent to the contest was done. Submission of entries to the contest is done through various methods such as that via a sent video application. It could also be done through a regional finals followed by a national qualifying round as is practiced by Russia, Bulgaria, Poland, Ukraine, Latvia, Lithuania, and Estonia, where their country's representative to the contest for the year is determined through a national selection finals. In Austria, an online pre-selection is done to determine the entry for the country. In other cases, the Organizing Committee of the contest decides on the submitted applications sent by e-mail by one country where no preliminary selection took place.

== Participation ==
Formerly, only citizens of European countries were eligible to participate in the contest, but since 2014 the contest has accepted participants from outside Europe, with the Philippines being the first country to do so.

== Hosting ==
The contest has always been hosted by Berlin, Germany and is entirely funded by contributions from participating nations. The contest has no sponsors; instead, it has several partners who help conduct the implementation of the competition within the framework of possibilities.
