= The Voice (franchise) =

International television series franchise

- Created by: John de Mol Jr.; Roel van Velzen
- Original work: The Voice of Holland
- Owners: Talpa Media (2010–2019); ITV Studios (2019–present)
- Years: 2010–present

Films and television
- Television series: The Voice (see international versions); The Voice Kids; The Voice Teens; The Voice Senior; The Voice Rap; The Voice All Stars; The Voice Generations; The Voice Native Songs; The Voice Pride; The Voice Celebrity

Audio
- Original music: "This Is the Voice" (theme song) composed by Martijn Schimmer

Miscellaneous
- Genre: Reality; Singing competition
- First aired: 17 September 2010; 16 years ago

Official website
- Production website

The Voice is an international reality television singing competition franchise originally created by Dutch producer John de Mol Jr. and Dutch singer Roel van Velzen.

It has become a rival to the Idol franchise, The Four, Rising Star and The X Factor. The owner of the franchise was Talpa Network up until 2020 and ITV Studios ever since.

Originating from the reality singing competition The Voice of Holland, many other countries adapted the format and began airing their own versions starting in 2010. Up till now, seven different versions of The Voice have been produced by countries/regions all around the world. Some programs still stick to the original format of the show while most of them are produced with twists of the format added.

The franchise maintains official YouTube channels called The Voice Global and La Voz Global (as the Spanish version). The channels upload compilation videos of performances from The Voice all around the world. The Voice Global channel currently has over 10 million subscribers. Other channels on YouTube such as Best of The Voice and Best of The Voice Kids also feature compilations of the performances.

== History ==
Talpa's John de Mol Jr., creator of Big Brother, first created The Voice concept with Dutch singer Roel van Velzen. Erland Galjaard, a Dutch program director, asked John de Mol about whether he could come up with a format that went a step further than The X Factor. De Mol then came up with the idea of Blind Audition. He wanted the show's image to be about the focus on singing quality alone, so the coaches must be top artists in the music industry. The rotating chairs concept was invented by Roel van Velzen. It would also be the first talent show in which social media was actively involved.

On 17 September 2010, The Voice of Holland began to air on RTL 4 with Angela Groothuizen, Roel van Velzen, Nick & Simon, and Jeroen van der Boom as the mentor-judges (dubbed as "coaches") of the show. The show proved to be an instant success in the Netherlands.

The format was later sold to different countries, in many cases replacing a previous Endemol music contest format, Operation Triumph/Star Academy.

== Original format ==
The show's format features five stages of competition: producers' auditions, blind auditions, battle rounds, knockouts (since 2012), and live performance shows.

=== Blind auditions ===
Contestants are aspiring singers drawn from public auditions (which are not broadcast) and active recruitment. Unlike Idols and The X Factor, the producers pick fewer contestants (usually from 100, up to 200 contestants), which are deemed "the best artists", to perform in the broadcast auditions. The first televised stage is the blind auditions, in which the four coaches, all noteworthy recording artists, listen to the contestants in chairs facing away from the stage so as to avoid seeing them and to prevent judging the contestants based on other factors. If a coach likes what they hear from that contestant, they press a button to rotate their chairs to signify that they are interested in working with that contestant. If more than one coach presses their button, the contestant chooses the coach he or she wants to work with. The blind auditions end when each coach has a set number of contestants to work with. Coaches will dedicate themselves to developing their singers mentally, musically and in some cases physically, giving them advice, and sharing the secrets of their success.

=== Battles ===
The contestants who successfully pass the blind auditions proceed to the battle rounds (dubbed The Cut/Callbacks in some versions), where the coaches put two or sometimes three of their own team members against each other to sing the same song together in front of a studio audience. After the vocal face-off, the coach must choose only one to advance. If no specific winner can be identified, either the competition turns to a game of fate via a coin toss, or the coach may combine them into a duo throughout the rest of the competition. In rare cases the coach can also choose to advance neither one (As seen in season eight of The Voice of Holland). In some versions, there are steals where opposing coaches can steal a contestant who was voted off by their own coach by pressing their button. As in the blind auditions, if more than one coach presses their button, the contestant chooses which coach they want. Each coach has a set number of steals, usually one or two (raised to three in the seventh season of The Voice Brasil).

=== Knockouts ===
The knockout round was introduced in 2012 and is implemented in some versions. The winners of the battle rounds proceed to this round (dubbed Super-battle round/Singoffs in some versions).

As in the battle rounds, coaches pit members of their own team (usually 2/3/4, rarely 6 or 10) against each other. This time, the contestants choose their own song to perform individually while the other watches and waits. After that, the coach chooses one to advance while the other is sent home. At the end of the knockout rounds, the strongest members of each coach's roster proceed to the live stage shows. Some versions include steals. Like in the battle round, the opposing coaches can steal a contestant who was voted off by their own coach by pressing their button. Similar to the blind auditions, if more than one coach presses their button, the contestant chooses which coach they want.

=== Live shows ===
In the final performance phase of the competition, the top contestants from each team compete against each other during a live broadcast. The television audience vote to save one contestant on each team, leaving the coach to decide on live television who they want to save and who will not move on. In the next round, the public chooses between the two artists left on each team, and the coach also has a vote that weighs equally with the public vote.

Finally, each coach will have their best contestant left standing to compete in the finals, singing an original song. From these four or five, one will be named "The Voice"—and will receive the grand prize of a recording contract and a cash prize. Universal Music Group is the general record company associated and affiliated with The Voice format in most countries.

=== Social media participation ===
One of the cornerstones of The Voice format is the social media participation via Twitter, Facebook and the specially designed platform "connect". Users are able to log in via their Facebook account and retrieve background information about the show. The platform also offers the possibility to stream the show online as well as to vote, interact with friends and to discuss various topics and questions asked by the producers throughout the show.

== Format variations ==
=== Blind auditions twists ===
==== No conversations if no turn ====
Starting from the fifth season of The Voice of Holland, if all the coaches rejected one specific contestant, they left the stage straight away, without any conversations with the coaches, and the chairs remained unturned. This format has been used in versions of other countries in list below;

Regular versions that adapted "No turn, No conversation" rule
| Regular Version | Season(s) | Ref. |
|---|---|---|
| Albania | 6 | |
| Armenia | 4 | |
| Australia | 15– | |
| Belgique | 4–6 | |
| Belgium | 6 | |
| Bulgaria | 4– | |
| Česko Slovensko | 3 | |
| Finland | 6– | |
| France | 6–8 | |
| Françafrique | 2–3 | |
| Georgia | 5 | |
| Germany | 6–8 | |
| Italy | 5 | |
| Kazakhstan | 3 | |
| Lithuania | 4–8 | |
| Mexico | 6–7, 11 | |
| Mongolia | 2– | |
| Myanmar | 2–3 | |
| Nepal | 4, 6– | |
| Nigeria | 3–4 | |
| Poland | 6– | |
| Romania | 5, 8 | |
| South Africa | 2–3 | |
| Sri Lanka | 2– | |
| Thailand | 6–8 | |
| Ukraine | 8 | |
| United Kingdom | 6– | |

==== "Block" buttons ====
The fourteenth season of the American version introduced a new mechanism for the blind auditions: "block" buttons. A coach who wants a specific contestant can prevent another coach from doing so by pressing that coach's "block" button instead of their own main button. The coach who is blocked will not know until pressing their red button; upon turning around, the word "blocked" appears on the LED floor instead of their name. More than 40 versions around the world have adapted this feature. In most cases, a coach can only use a single block button per season, although variations exist, as indicated in the table below.

Countries that adapted the "block" buttons
| Country / Region | Version | Season(s) | Notes | Ref. |
|---|---|---|---|---|
| Arab World | Regular | 5– | In season 6, a coach can block another one after the performance, and the blocked coach's chair will turn to the audience again. | |
| Arab World | Kids | 4– | Coach can block another one after the performance, and the blocked coach's chair will turn to the audience again | |
| Argentina | Regular | 4– | Each coach has three "blocks". Coaches press the "block" button and then the main one. In the next season, the button block was made the main | |
| Afrique Francophone | Regular | 4 | | |
| Australia | Regular | 9– | The number of "blocks" is two for each coach and two blocks are permitted in a single audition. Also, the "block" can only be used after the blocked and the blocking coaches have already turned around. Starting in season 11, the "block" buttons can be used even after the contestant's performance. In season 12, "block" buttons can be used before the blocked coach turns and, then, the chair does not turn around. In season 13, "blocks" are reduced to one, however, the second block was replaced with a twist called "ultimate block" which "blocks" all other turned coaches. | |
| Belgium | Regular (French) | 8– | Starting in season 9, the number of "blocks" increased to two per coach. In season 11, a coach can block another one after the performance, and the blocked coach's chair will turn to the audience again. The "superblock" buttons were removed in season 12 but was replaced with a twist called "ultimate block" which "blocks" all other turned coaches | |
| Belgium | Kids (French) | 2 | Each coach has three "blocks" to use. The block buttons were removed in season 3 | |
| Belgium | Regular (Dutch) | 6, 9– | The "block" buttons were removed in season 7. It returned in season 9, and coach can block another one after the performance, and the blocked coach's chair will turn to the audience again The "superblock" buttons were removed in season 10 but was replaced with a twist called "ultimate block" which "blocks" all other turned coaches | |
| Belgium | Kids (Dutch) | 5–7 | Two "blocks" for each coach. In season 7, blocks were reduced to one and a coach can block another one after the performance, and the blocked coach's chair will turn to the audience again. The "superblock" buttons were removed in season 8 | |
| Brazil | Regular | 7– | The "blocks" are also possible in the battles round. Starting in season 8, the number of blocks per coach was raised to two, only in the auditions. Starting in season 10, the "block" buttons were only available during the auditions. In season 11, two " blocks" are permitted in a single audition. In season 12 the blocks returned in the battles. | |
| Bulgaria | Regular | 6– | Only in season 7, when the blocked coach tried to turn around, the chair did not turn. Starting in season 8, each coach had two "blocks" to use. Starting in season 10, blocking a coach could happen only when the audition ended, and the blocked coach's chair will turn back to the audience. From season 11 two blocks are permitted in a single audition. In season 12 each coach had one "block" and one "superblock" to use during the auditions. | |
| Cambodia | Regular | 3 | | |
| Canada (Quebec) | Regular | 7– | In season 10, a coach can block another one after the performance, and the blocked coach's chair will turn to the audience again, and coaches are given two "blocks". | |
| Chile | Regular | 4 | Coaches can use the "block" buttons indefinitely, and two coaches can be blocked in a single audition. When the blocked coach tries to turn for the contestant, the chair does not turn around. | |
| Colombia | Kids | 6 | Coaches can use the "block" buttons indefinitely, and when the blocked coach presses their button to turn, the chair does not turn The "block" buttons were removed in season 7. around. | |
| Colombia | Senior | 2 | Coaches can use the "block" buttons indefinitely, and when the blocked coach presses their button to turn, the chair does not turn around. | |
| Croatia | Regular | 3– | | |
| Croatia | Kids | 1– | In season 2 it was allowed to block two coaches | |
| Finland | Regular | 11– | Coaches press the "block" button first and then the main button for the block to be valid. Blocked coach can turn first before the one who did block. Starting in season 13, each coach had two "blocks" to use. | |
| France | Regular | 8– | Starting in season 11, the number of "blocks" per coach was raised to two. In season 12, a coach can block another one after the performance, and the blocked coach's chair will turn to the audience again. | |
| France | Kids | 6– | In season 9, a coach can block another one during or after the performance, and the blocked coach's chair will turn to the audience again. | |
| Georgia | Regular | 4– | | |
| Germany | Regular | 13– | Each coach has three "blocks" to use. Starting in season 15 the amount of "blocks" were reduced to two per coach and the "block" can be used at any time, even after the contestants performance. In season 16 the amount of "blocks" were raised to three | |
| Greece | Regular | 5– | The number of available "blocks" is four per coach. | |
| Hungary | Regular | 2 | | |
| India | Regular | 3 | | |
| Indonesia | Regular | 4 | | |
| Indonesia | Kids | 4 | Two "blocks" for each coach. | |
| Israel | Regular | 5– | | |
| Italy | Regular | 5–6 | The "block" buttons only blocks the coach, and the coach who presses it only turns around by pressing the main button. If only the blocked coach turns around, it is considered that no coaches turned for the contestant; this was removed in season 6. The number of "blocks" raised from one to two per coach. | |
| Italy | Senior | 1– | | |
| Italy | Kids | 1– | In season 2, a coach can block another one after the performance, and the blocked coach's chair will turn to the audience again. | |
| Italy | Generations | 1– | Coach can block another one after the performance, and the blocked coach's chair will turn to the audience again | |
| Lithuania | Regular | 7– | Starting in season 9, each coach was given two "blocks" in the entire season. | |
| Lithuania | Generations | 1– | Starting in season 2, each coach was given two "blocks" in the entire season. | |
| Mexico | Regular | 7, 9–11 | In season 8, after the show was acquired by TV Azteca, the "block" buttons were not used. They returned in season 9, and each coach had two "blocks" to use. In season 11, the "blocks" available per coach increased to four. | |
| Mongolia | Regular | 3– | Each coach is given two "blocks" to use. Coaches turn their chair first, and then press the block button. | |
| Nepal | Regular | 5– | | |
| Nepal | Kids | 3– | | |
| Netherlands | Regular | 12 | Coaches can block another one after they have turned around. In season 13, the "block" buttons were removed. | |
| Nigeria | Regular | 4 | | |
| Peru | Regular | 4–6 | Three "blocks" per coach. Starting in season 6, two "blocks" are permitted in a single audition. | |
| Peru | Senior | 1–2 | Three "blocks" per coach and two "blocks" are permitted in a single audition. In season 2, coaches may block another one after they have turned around. | |
| Peru | Kids | 4–5 | | |
| Peru | Generations | 1 | | |
| Philippines | Teens | 2–3 | The number of "blocks" is two for each coach. | |
| Philippines | Kids | 5 | In season 6, "block" buttons were removed shortly after the show being acquired by GMA Network | |
| Poland | Regular | 11– | Two "blocks" for each coach, and two coaches can be blocked in one audition. In season 12–13, the "block" buttons can be used even after a contestant's performance. From the fourteenth season coaches can use their block buttons only after a contestant's performance, and the blocked coach's chair will turn to the audience again. Also, this season "superblocks" was increased to three. In season 15 the number of superblocks was reduced to two as in seasons 11–13. | |
| Portugal | Regular | 6– | In season 8, blocking a coach could happen when they have already turned around; also, blocks were increased to two. Starting in season 9, two coaches can be blocked in a single audition. In season 10, the blocked coach's chair won't turn around but this only applies if the blocking coach pressed the "block" button first before the blocked coach. In season 11, a coach can block another one after the performance, and the blocked coach's chair will turn to the audience again. In season 12 three coaches can be superblocked in a single audition. In season 13 the number of superblocks was reduced to one. | |
| Portugal | Kids | 2– | Two blocks per coach, and coaches can block another one after they have turned around. Starting in season 4, the "block" buttons can be used even after the contestant's performance. In season 5, a coach can block another one after the performance, and the blocked coach's chair will turn to the audience again. In season 7 the number of superblocks was reduced to one. | |
| Portugal | Generations | 2– | Starting in season 3, blocking a coach could happen only when the audition ended, and the blocked coach's chair will turn back to the audience. | |
| Romania | Regular | 8– | From season 12, a coach can block another one after the performance, and the blocked coach's chair will turn to the audience again. | |
| Russia | Regular | 11– | In 11th season each coach had three "blocks" to use. From 12th season each coach has four "blocks" to use and amount of blocked coaches has increased: from 1 to 2 in single blind audition. From 13th season each coach has an unlimited quantity of "blocks" to use during blind auditions. | |
| South Korea | Regular | 3 | | |
| Spain | Regular | 6– | The number of "blocks" per coach is three and when the blocked coach presses their button to turn, the chair does not turn around. In season 9, two coaches can be blocked in a single audition. In season 10, a coach can block another one after the performance, and the blocked coach's chair will turn to the audience again. This season consists of 2 blocks and superblocks per coach. In season 11 the number of super blocks has been increased to three and it is possible to block three coaches in one audition | |
| Spain | Kids | 5– | The number of "blocks" per coach was two and when the blocked coach presses their button to turn, the chair does not turn around. In season 7, the "blocks" given to coach raised to three and two coaches can be blocked in single audition. In season 9, a coach can block another one after the performance, and the blocked coach's chair will turn to the audience again. This season consists of 3 blocks and 2 superblocks per coach. | |
| Spain | Senior | 2–3 | When the blocked coach presses their button to turn, the chair does not turn around. | |
| Spain | All Stars | 1 | A coach can block another one after the performance, and the blocked coach's chair will turn to the audience again. Each coach is granted one superblock. | |
| Sri Lanka | Regular | 3– | | |
| Thailand | Regular | 7– | The number of "blocks" started to be two per coach, but got increased to three in season 8. In season 9, a coach can block another one after the performance, and the blocked coach's chair will turn to the audience again. The number of block has decreased to one per coach | |
| Thailand | Kids | 7 | | |
| Thailand | All Stars | 1 | | |
| Thailand | Pride | 1– | Coach can block another one after the performance, and the blocked coach's chair will turn to the audience again | |
| Turkey | Regular | 9– | Coaches can use the "block" buttons indefinitely; two coaches can be blocked in a single audition; "block" buttons can be used after the contestant's performance. | |
| Turkey | RAP | 1–2 | | |
| Ukraine | Regular | 9–10 | In season 11, the "block" buttons were removed. | |
| United Kingdom | Regular | 10–11 | In season 12, the "block" buttons were removed. | |
| United States | Regular (English) | 14–28 | The "block" buttons were removed in season 29 | |
| United States | Regular (Spanish) | 1–2 | In season 2, the number of "blocks" was increased to two. | |
| Uruguay | Regular | 3– | Two blocks per coach with two blocks permitted in a single audition, and can be used only after the performance, and the blocked coach's chair will turn to the audience again. | |
| Uruguay | Kids | 2– | When the blocked coach presses their button to turn, the chair does not turn around. | |
| Vietnam | Regular | 5–6 | Starting on season 6, a coach can turn their chair first, and then press the block button to block another coach. | |
| Vietnam | Kids | 6–8 | In season 7, the number of blocks was raised to two per coach, and the blocked coach's chair does not turn around. However, the contestants are able to unblock the blocked coach and choose their team. In season 8, the number of "blocks" per coach was reduced from two to one. | |

==== "Mute" button ====
The sixth season of the Vietnamese kids' version, Giọng hát Việt nhí, had a new feature called "Mute button". As its name implies, the muted coach is not allowed to speak, but can still do any kind of body language to convince the contestant to join their team. The "mute" only adds excitement to the program, as contestants can still pick the muted coach. Each coach has one "mute" per audition. It was shortly removed, in the seventh season, and then returned in the next season. The eleventh season of Vocea României also applied the mute buttons, but the coaches have to use it after the coaches have turned around. In season 11 of La Voz, coaches also have their chances to mute another coach. In season 13 of The Voice Kids Germany, coach can mute all turning coaches and have their seats turn back to the audience. However, the mute feature was removed in the following season.

==== "Wild Card" round, "The Comeback Stage" and "Second Chance Coach" ====
The "Wild Card" round was introduced in the first two seasons of The Voice of Holland, wherein the failed contestants from the blind auditions were screened and would perform via radio program Radio 538. Some coaches would select if they want that contestant on their team to compete in the battles, but it was abandoned in later seasons.

In the 15th season of the English-American version, a similar concept was introduced, called "The Comeback Stage". On it, a fifth coach would mentor contestants that failed to make it into a team in the blind auditions, and they would compete against each other in a digital series, broadcast on YouTube. The winner, chosen by the public, secured a spot in the live shows. This round was acquired in other countries such as Germany, Indonesia, Spain, Finland, Flanders, Argentina, Brazil, Netherlands, France, Ukraine, Chile, Canada, Sri Lanka, Thailand, Poland and in the Spanish-American version.

In the 15th season of The Voice Australia, a new concept of gave artists a Second Chance from a fifth coach who would mentor contestants that failed to make it into a team in the blind auditions in order to prepare them to audition again.

==== Switch artists ====
The sixth season of Giọng hát Việt introduced the "Switch". Coaches with a full team could press the "switch" button to swap one contestant with another contestant that expressed interest in the coach. Each coach only has one "switch" during the course of the blind auditions.

With this feature, the "Special coach" was also introduced this season. One of the four coaches has their chair turned towards the stage during all performances, allowing them to know how the contestants look like. This coach has the ability to choose unlimited contestants, unlike other coaches, and their selection button is still valid even when the contestant has finished their performance. However, the "special coach" can only select contestants that were not chosen by the other three coaches.

==== No limit of team members ====
In season ten of Australian The Voice, the coaches did not have a limit on the number of contestants they could turn for during the blind auditions. However, in order to balance out numbers, a following round was introduced (straight after the blind auditions), called "The Cut". Coaches hold a private callback session with their team to make them battle for five spots in the knockouts round. This rule was also adapted in Bulgaria, Dominican Republic, Romania, Finland, Lithuania and Belgium.

==== "Battle pass" ====
The eleventh season of Australian The Voice introduced the "Battle pass". In this twist, coaches have a silver button who they can press to send the contestant automatically to the battles round (later removed in the twelfth season). Each coach could only press the button once during the auditions. This addition was also acquired in the fourth season of The Voice Nigeria.

==== "Superpass" ====
In the second season of The Voice Kids Italy, a new button called "Superpass" was introduced. Once a coach presses the button, it automatically blocks the other coaches, and then the talent is defaulted to the coach's team, straight to the finale. This format is applied in the fifth season of The Voice Kids Portugal wherein after a Coach pressed this special button feature, the Talent will move straight ahead to the live shows, it was later introduced in the twelfth season of the main edition. In the eleventh season of Glasat na Bulgaria the Button blocks all the other coaches, and the contestants goes to The Battles.

==== "Second Chance" buttons ====
In the fourth season of the Italian version of The Voice Senior, a new button called "Second Chance Button" was introduced. When a contestant fails to make to a team, one of the coaches can hit this button in order to allow this contestant to audition again in a following episode. It subsequently appeared in the fourteenth season of The Voice la plus belle voix, and in the twenty-eighth season of the American version, with the notable change that is the host who can give a second chance to an artist. Vocea României will also introduce the "Second Chance Button" on its fourteenth season – each coach can save one contestant on the spot, while the host can give one contestant the chance to audition again in a subsequent episode.

==== "Coach Replay" ====
In the twenty-sixth season of the American version of The Voice, a new feature was introduced, dubbed the "Coach Replay". This addition allows each coach to press their button one time in the span of the blind auditions for an artist that was originally eliminated with no coaches turning. The artist is subsequently defaulted to that team. The "Coach Replay" returned for season twenty-seven, where this time a coach may use it if he/she did not initially turn and if one or more of the other coaches did turn to make the coach who didn't turn eligible for the artist to pick. It subsequently appeared in season 12 of La Voz Spain, season 13 of The Voice Portugal, season 12 of The Voice Belgique, season 11 of La Voz Kids and season 14 of The Voice UK (renamed as "Rewind").

=== Battles twists ===
The seventh season of The Voice of Holland created the non-stop "steal", which means that coaches may replace their stolen contestant as many times as they want until the end of the battles. This feature was adapted in Poland, Romania, Dutch-Belgium, Portugal, Ukraine, Armenia, the Arab World, Norway, Israel, Vietnam, Germany, the Dominican Republic, Bulgaria, Kazakhstan and France.

The fourth season of Spanish La Voz Kids introduced the "supercoach". Instead of the regular coaches choosing whom of their team artists advance in the competition, this rule belonged to the "supercoach".

The fifth season of Giọng hát Việt featured the "no-elimination" twist. When a coach wants to advance both artists to the next round, they can ask and get consent from both contestants to become a duo throughout the rest of the competition. If a coach does not get consent, they must choose only one to advance to the knockouts, as the original format.

The 23rd season of the American series introduced the "playoff pass", which allows each coach to advance further both artists of a battle: one advances to the knockouts, and the recipient of the "pass" will bypass the knockouts and go directly to the playoffs.

The eleventh season of The Voice Portugal features live battles, the first in the franchise worldwide.

=== Knockouts twists ===
The third season of The Voice South Africa introduced a new way to conduct the knockouts round: after each contestant's solo performance, the respective coach will have to decide whether they are in the "Safe Zone" – which means qualified for the next round – or the "Danger Zone" – at risk of elimination. Each coach can only send three contestants to the "safe zone", and also have two steals to use across the round. After all members from one team have concluded their performances, the coach will save a number of artists from the "danger zone" to move on to the battles. Contestants who are sent to the "danger zone" and not chosen by their coach are eliminated. However, the audience can also save one artist in the "danger zone" by televoting. This rule was then applied in the eighth season of The Voice: la plus belle voix, where public's vote is not included, in the third season of The Voice Nigeria and in the eleventh season of Glasat na Bulgaria.

==== Super Save ====
In the 24th season of the American series introduced the "super save", which allows each coach to save an eliminated artist from their or another coach's team and have them advance in their team.

==== Teamfights ====
In the 13th season of The Voice of Germany the third phase was called Teamfights. Every coach had nine talents from the battles and in every episode, three of each team are singing for four Hot-Seats. The coaches choose one talent in each round und afterwards they decide against with singer they want to fight for a Hot-Seat. The four talents who are sitting on the seats after the last contestant advanced to the semifinal. So, it is possible that one coach gets the whole team in the next phase or lose all the team members. The winner of each fight was chosen by the studio visitors.

==== The Groups ====
In the 14th season on The Voice – La plus belle voix was first introduced. Every coach can divide into 3 or 4 participants and can choose from 1 to 3 participants. After the stage is completed, each coach will have 6 participants left who will advance to the battle stage.

=== Live shows twists ===
The cross-battles were introduced in the semi-final of the fourth season of The Voice of Holland. In this round, two contestants from two different teams compete against each other and the public determines who advances. This was also introduced in Brasil, Greece, Vietnam, United States' English and Spanish versions, France, Bulgaria, Lithuania, Ukraine, Belgium Vlaanderen, Canada and Belgium.

=== All-Star format ===
The eighth and ninth seasons of Australian The Voice introduced a new twist, called all-star. Former contestants from past seasons were able to compete just like new talents. Diana Rouvas and Chris Sebastian from the first season of the show were hailed as champions of seasons eight and nine, respectively. This status was adapted in Germany, Portugal and Brazil.

On the other hand, an "All-Stars" edition that is only for previous candidates was announced by the ITV Studios' President Maarten Meijs, in September 2020. TF1 was the first broadcaster to air this version. The format was then applied in Finland, Thailand, Spain and Indonesia.

== Non-televised shows ==
There were non-televised shows as not seen in the various format of the franchise such as The Voice of the Ocean (US) with Princess Cruises, The Voice of the Ocean (Germany) with AIDA Cruises, The Voice of the Sea (Italian) with Costa Cruises, The Voice Univa and The Voice Teens Univa (Spanish) with Grupo Telecentro in Mexico.

== The Voice around the world ==
A combined 753 singers have won The Voice, The Voice Kids, The Voice Teens, The Voice Senior, The Voice Rap, The Voice All-Stars, The Voice Generations, The Voice Native Songs, and The Voice Pride in 78 countries/regions. Each winner is given a recording contract, a monetary prize, and a title as that nation's "Voice". The first winner was Ben Saunders from The Voice of Holland. The most recent was Giovanni Scribano from The Voice Senior Italy

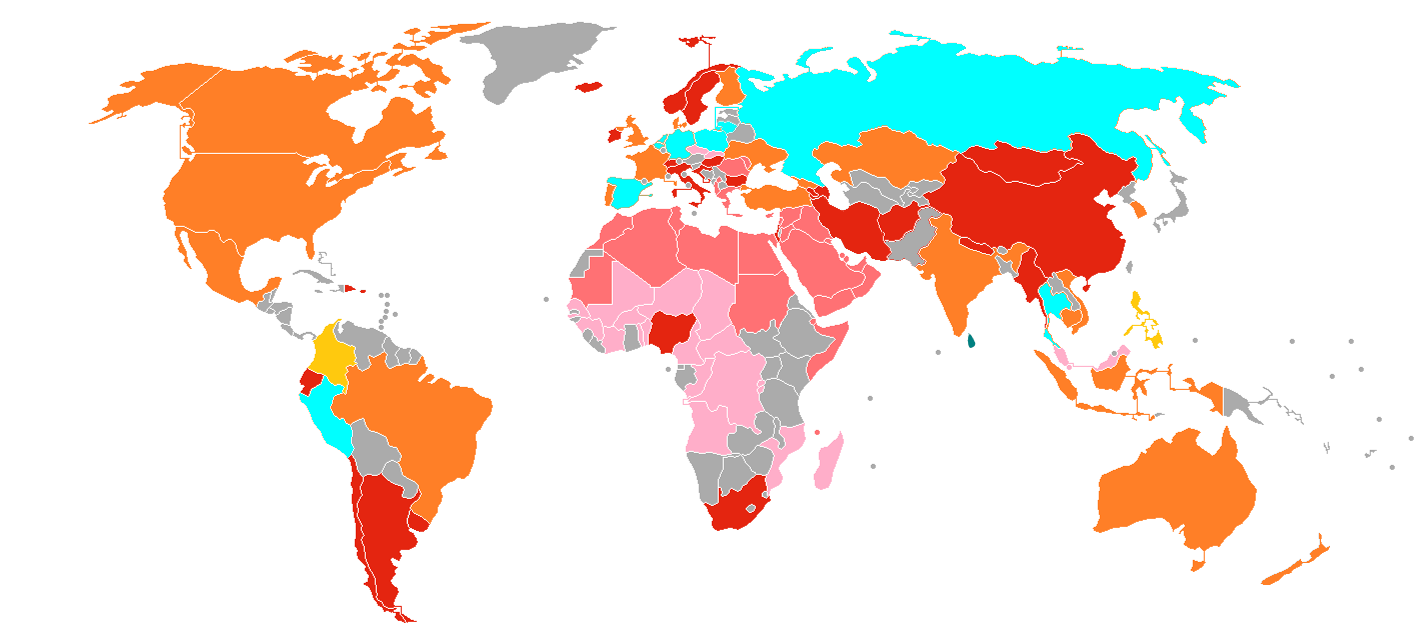
Location of The Voice versions: With own version of The Voice With own versions of The Voice and The Voice Teens With own versions of The Voice and The Voice Kids With own versions of The Voice, The Voice Kids and The Voice Teens With own versions of The Voice, The Voice Kids and The Voice Senior Part of a regional or multinational version of The Voice Part of a regional or multinational versions of The Voice and The Voice Kids Part of a regional or multinational versions of The Voice, The Voice Kids and The Voice Senior Part of a regional or multinational versions of The Voice, The Voice Kids, The Voice Teens and The Voice Senior

Key

Franchise with a currently airing season
Franchise with an upcoming season
Franchise with an unknown status
Franchise that has ceased to air
Franchise that was cancelled during production

Alphabet

The Voice versions around the world
| Country/Region | Local title | Network | Winners | Coaches | Hosts |
|---|---|---|---|---|---|
| Afghanistan | آواز افغانستان; The Voice of Afghanistan | Tolo TV | Season 1, 2013: Jawed Yosufi; Season 2, 2014: Najibullah Shirzad | Aryana Sayeed (1); Qais Ulfat (1–2); Nazir Khara (1–2); Obaid Juenda (1–2); Fereshta Samah (2) | Ahmad Popal (1); Omid Nezami (2); Kadija Sadat (backstage, 1–2) |
| Africa | The Voice Africa | Airtel TV | Season 1, 2023–24: Cancelled | Yemi Alade; Awilo Longomba; Lady Jaydee; Locko | Gaetano Kagwa; Dakore Egbuson-Akande |
| Africa Françafrique | Current; The Voice – Plus qu'une voix (5–); The Voice – More than a voice Former; The Voice Afrique Francophone (1–4) | Current; Canal+ Afrique (5–); Former; VoxAfrica (1–4) | Season 1, 2016–17: Pamela Baketana; Season 2, 2017–18: Victoire Biaku; Season 3, 2020–21: Lady Shine; Season 4, 2024: Vova Music; Season 5, 2026: Saara Houansou | Current; Josey (4–); Franglish (5–); Emma'a (5–); Meiway (5–); Former; A'salfo (1–2)^{20}; Singuila (1–2); Nayanka Bell (3)^{20}; Lokua Kanza (1–3); Charlotte Dipanda (1–3)^{20}; Hiro Le Coq (3); Mix Premier (4); Didi B (4); O’Nel Mala (4); Guest coaches; Josey (2, live shows)^{20}; Youssoupha (2–3, live shows)^{20} | Current; Jean Michel Onnin (5–); Former; Claudy Siar (1–3); Yves Zogbo Jr. (4) |
| Africa Françafrique | The Voice Kids | Current; Canal+ Afrique (5–); Former; VoxAfrica (1–4) | Season 1, 2022: Myriam Obama | Daphne; Sidiki Diabaté; Teeyah; KS Bloom ^{7} | Willy Dumbo |
| Albania; Kosovo | The Voice of Albania^{1} | Top Channel; Website | Season 1, 2011–12: Rina Bilurdagu; Season 2, 2012–13: Venera Lumani; Season 3, 2013–14: Florent Abrashi; Season 4, 2014–15: Aslaidon Zaimaj; Season 5, 2016: Tiri Gjoci; Season 6, 2017: Klinti Çollaku | Miriam Cani (1–2); Elton Deda (1–3); Aurela Gaçe (3); Elsa Lila (4); Alma Bektashi (1–5); Sidrit Bejleri (1–5); Genc Salihu (4–5); Jonida Maliqi (5); Alban Skënderaj (6); Besa Kokëdhima (6); Rona Nishliu (6); Xuxi (6) | Ledion Liço (1–6); Marina Vjollca (backstage, 1); Kiara Tito (backstage, 5); Mishel Rrena (backstage, 5); Fjoralba Ponari (backstage, 6) |
| Albania; Kosovo | The Voice Kids | Top Channel; Website | Season 1, 2013: Rita Thaqi; Season 2, 2018: Denis Bonjaku; Season 3, 2019: Altea Ali | Alma Bektashi (1); Altin Goci (1); Elton Deda (1); Eneda Tarifa (2); Aleksandër & Renis Gjoka (duo, 2–3); Miriam Cani (2–3); Arilena Ara (3) | Xhemi Shehu (1); Ledion Liço (2); Dojna Mema (backstage, 2; main, 3); Flori Gjini (backstage, 3) |
| Angola; Mozambique | The Voice Angola^{5} | Dstv | Season 1, 2015–16: Mariedne Feliciano | Dji Tafinha; Paulo Flores; Yola Semedo; Walter Ananaz | Dinamene Cruz; Weza Solange (backstage) |
| Arab World | The Voice – أحلى صوت; The Voice – Best Voice | MBC1; LBCI; Website | Season 1, 2012: Mourad Bouriki; Season 2, 2013–14: Sattar Saad; Season 3, 2015: Nedaa Sharara; Season 4, 2018: Dumooa Tahseen; Season 5, 2019: Mahdi Ayachi; Season 6, 2025–26: Joudy Shahen^{33} | Sherine (1–3); Saber Rebaï (1–3); Kazem al-Saher (1–3); Assi El Helani (1–4); Ahlam (4–5); Elissa (4); Mohamed Hamaki (4–5); Samira Said (5); Ragheb Alama (5); Nassif Zeytoun (6); Rahma Riad (6); Ahmed Saad (6) | Arwa Goudeh (1–2); Mohammad Kareem (1–2); Aimée Sayah (3); Nardine Farag (4–5); Nadine Njeim (backstage, 1–2); Moamen Nour (backstage, 3); Badr Al Zaidan (backstage, 4); Yaser Al Sakkaf (backstage, 5, main 6–) |
| Arab World | The Voice Kids – أحلى صوت; The Voice Kids – Best Voice | MBC1; LBCI; Website | Season 1, 2016: Lynn Hayek; Season 2, 2017–18: Hamza Labyad; Season 3, 2020: Mohamad Islam Rmeih; Season 4, 2026: Lama Qais | Tamer Hosny (1–2); Kazem al-Saher (1–2); Nancy Ajram (1–3); Assi El Helani (3); Mohamed Hamaki (3); Ramy Sabry (4); Dalia Mubarak (4); Al Shami (4) | Aimée Sayah (1); Moamen Nour (1); Nardine Farag (2–3); Badr Al Zaidan (2–3); Andria Tayeh (4–) |
| Arab World | The Voice Senior – أحلى صوت; The Voice Senior – Best Voice | MBC1; LBCI; Website | Season 1, 2020: Abdou Yaghi | Melhem Zein; Samira Said; Najwa Karam; Hany Shaker^{†} | Annabella Hilal |
| Argentina | La Voz Argentina; The Voice Argentina^{18} | Telefe; Website | Season 1, 2012: Gustavo Corvalán; Season 2, 2018: Braulio Assanelli; Season 3, 2021: Francisco Benitez; Season 4, 2022: Yhosva Montoya; Season 5, 2025: Nicolás Behringer | Current; Soledad Pastorutti; Lali Espósito (3–); Miranda! (duo, 1, 5–); Luck Ra (5–); Karina la Princesita (comeback stage, 5–); Former; El Puma (1); Axel (1–2); Tini Stoessel (2); Ricardo Montaner (2–4); Mau y Ricky (duo, 3–4); Comeback Stage; Emilia Mernes (comeback stage, 3)^{19}; MYA (duo, comeback stage, 4)^{19} | Current; Nico Occhiato (5–); Former; Marley; Luli Fernández (backstage, 1); Candelaria Molfese (digital host, 2); Stefi Roitman (digital host, 3); Rocío Igarzábal (digital host, 4) |
| Armenia | Հայաստանի ձայնը The Voice of Armenia | Armenia TV | Season 1, 2012–13: Meri "Masha" Mnjoyan; Season 2, 2013: Ana Khanchalyan; Season 3, 2014: Raisa Avanessian; Season 4, 2017: Hayk Ghulyan | Tata Simonyan (1); Arto Tunçboyaciyan (1); Christine Pepelyan (2); Michael Poghosyan (2); Shushan Petrosyan (2); Hayko^{†} (2–3); Sona (1, 3); Armen Martirosyan (3); Eva Rivas (3); Sofi Mkheyan (1, 4); Aramé (4); Nune Yesayan (4); Sevak Khanagyan (4) | Rafael Ghazaryan (1–3); Nazeni Hovhannisyan (1–4); Ara Kazaryan (4); Hakob Hakobyan (backstage, 1–3); Hrach Muradyan (backstage, 1–3) |
| Australia | The Voice | Current; Seven Network (10–); Former; Nine Network (1–9) | Season 1, 2012: Karise Eden; Season 2, 2013: Harrison Craig; Season 3, 2014: Anja Nissen; Season 4, 2015: Ellie Drennan; Season 5, 2016: Alfie Arcuri; Season 6, 2017: Judah Kelly; Season 7, 2018: Sam Perry; Season 8, 2019: Diana Rouvas; Season 9, 2020: Chris Sebastian; Season 10, 2021: Bella Taylor Smith; Season 11, 2022: Lachie Gill; Season 12, 2023: Tarryn Stokes; Season 13, 2024: Reuben De Melo; Season 14, 2025: Alyssa Delpopolo; Season 15, 2026: Yung Milla | Joel Madden (solo^{6}, 1–3); will.i.am (3); Kylie Minogue (3); Ricky Martin (2–4); Jessie J (4–5); Joel & Benji Madden (duo^{6}, 4–5); Seal (1–2, 6); Joe Jonas (7); Delta Goodrem (1–2, 4–9); Boy George (6–9); Kelly Rowland (6–9); Keith Urban (1, 10–11); Jessica Mauboy (10–12); Rita Ora (10–12); Jason Derulo (12); Guy Sebastian (8–13); LeAnn Rimes (13); Adam Lambert (13); Kate Miller-Heidke (13–15); Ronan Keating (5, 14–15); Richard Marx (14–15); Melanie C (14–15); Tones and I (second chance, 15)^{19} | Darren McMullen (1–4, 9); Renee Bargh (9); Sonia Kruger (4–8, 10–15); Faustina Agolley (backstage, 1–2) |
| Australia | The Voice Kids | Nine Network | Season 1, 2014: Alexa Curtis | Delta Goodrem; Mel B; Joel & Benji Madden (duo) | Darren McMullen; Prinnie Stevens (backstage) |
| Australia | The Voice Generations^{30} Original | Seven Network | Season 1, 2022: Caitlin & Tim Rizzoli | Guy Sebastian; Keith Urban; Jessica Mauboy; Rita Ora | Sonia Kruger |
| Azerbaijan | Səs Azərbaycan; The Voice of Azerbaijan | Current itv (2–)^{24} Former; AzTV (1) | Season 1, 2015–16: Emiliya Yaqubova; Season 2, 2021–22: Nadir Rustamli; Season 3, 2025: Jamila Hashimova | Current; Murad Arif (2–); Eldar Gasimov (2–); Zulfiyya Khanbabayeva (3–); Röya Aykhan (3–); Former; Faiq Ağayev (1); Mübariz Tağiyev (1); Manana Japaridze (1); Tünzalə Ağayeva (1–2); Brilliant Dadashova (2) | Current; Azer Suleymanli (2–); Former; Tural Asadov (1) |
| Azerbaijan | Səs Uşaqlar; The Voice Kids Azerbaijan | itv^{24} | Season 1, 2020–21: Amina Hajiyeva | Chingiz Mustafayev; Zulfiyya Khanbabayeva; Murad Arif | Leyla Quliyeva |
| Azerbaijan | Səs Azərbaycan. Doğma Nəğmələr; The Voice of Azerbaijan. Native Songs; Original | itv^{24} | Season 1, 2023: Zulfu Asadzade | Gulyaz Memmedova; Ilqar Xeyal; Samira Aliyeva | Azer Suleymanli |
| Belgium; Flanders; Wallonia | The Voice van Vlaanderen (Dutch); The Voice of Flanders | vtm Website | Season 1, 2011–12: Glenn Claes; Season 2, 2013: Paulien Mathues; Season 3, 2014: Tom De Man; Season 4, 2016: Lola Obasuyi; Season 5, 2017: Luka Cruysberghs; Season 6, 2019: Ibe Wuyts; Season 7, 2021: Grace Khuabi; Season 8, 2022: Louise Goedefroy; Season 9, 2024: Christophe Verholle; Season 10, 2026: Bas Serra; Season 11, 2027: Upcoming season | Current; Koen Wauters; Mathieu Terryn (8–); Laura Tesoro (10–); Joost Klein (10–); Maarten & Dorothee (duo, comeback stage 10–)^{19}; Former; Jasper Steverlinck (1–2); Axelle Red (3); Regi Penxten (3); Bent Van Looy (3–4); Alex Callier (1–2, 5–6); Bart Peeters (4–6); Tourist LeMC (7); Niels Destadsbader (7); Natalia (1–2, 4–9); Jan Paternoster (8–9); Comeback Stage; Laura Tesoro (comeback stage, 7–9)^{19} | Current; An Lemmens; Aster Nzeyimana (9–); Former; Sean Dhondt (1–3, 5–7); Aaron Blommaert (8); Sam De Bruyn (backstage, 4) |
| Belgium; Flanders; Wallonia | The Voice Kids (Dutch) | vtm Website | Season 1, 2014: Mentissa Aziza; Season 2, 2015–16: Jens Dolleslagers; Season 3, 2017: Katarina Pohlodkova; Season 4, 2018: Jade De Rijcke; Season 5, 2020: Gala Aliaj; Season 6, 2022: Karista Khan; Season 7, 2023: Sikudhani Mbugua; Season 8, 2027: Upcoming season; Season 9, 2028: Upcoming season | Current; Metejoor (6–); Camille Dhont (8–); Maksim Stojanac (8–); Thibault Christiaensen (8–); Former; Regi Penxten (1); Natalia (1–2); Slongs Dievanongs (2); Josje Huisman (3); Sean Dhondt (1–5); Gers Pardoel (4–5); K3 (trio, 4–6)^{17}; Duncan Laurence (6); Laura Tesoro (3–7); Coely (7); Pommelien Thijs (7) | Current; Nora Gharib (7–); Aaron Blommaert (7–); Former; An Lemmens (1–6); Koen Wauters (6); Kürt Rogiers (backstage, 1–3); Sieg De Doncker (backstage, 4–5); Maksim Stojanac (backstage, 6) |
| Belgium; Flanders; Wallonia | The Voice Senior(Dutch) | vtm Website | Season 1, 2018: John Leo; Season 2, 2020: Roland Van Beeck | Helmut Lotti (1); Dana Winner (1); Natalia (1); Walter Grootaers (1–2); Sam Gooris (2); Karen Damen (2); André Hazes Jr. (2) | An Lemmens |
| Belgium; Flanders; Wallonia | The Voice Belgique(French); The Voice Belgium | La Une; VivaCité; Website | Season 1, 2011–12: Roberto Bellarosa; Season 2, 2013: David Madi; Season 3, 2014: Laurent Pagna; Season 4, 2015: Florent Brack; Season 5, 2016: Laura Cartesiani; Season 6, 2017: Théophile Rénier; Season 7, 2018: Valentine Brognion; Season 8, 2019: Charlotte Foret; Season 9, 2020–21: Jérémie Makiese; Season 10, 2021–22: Alec Golard; Season 11, 2024: Emma Sorgato; Season 12, 2026: Clément Chevalier | Current; Christophe Willem (10–); Loïc Nottet (9, 12–); Axelle Red (12–); Hoshi (12–); Former; Lio (1); Joshua (duo, 1); Natasha St-Pier (2–3); Bastian Baker (3); Jali (4); Chimène Badi (4); Stanislas (4–5); Cats on Trees (duo, 5); Quentin Mosimann (1–2, 5–6); Marc Pinilla (2–3, 6); Bigflo & Oli (duo, 6); Vitaa (7–8); Slimane (7–8); Matthew Irons (7–8); Henri PFR (9); Typh Barrow (8–10); Black M (10); BJ Scott (1–7, 9–11); Hatik (11); Mentissa Aziza (11) | Current; Jérémie Baise (12–); Former; Maureen Louys (1–11); Adrien Devyver (backstage, 1–3); Walid (backstage, 4–6); Cécile Djunga (backstage, 7); Fanny Jandrain (Blind auditions and Knockouts: 10) |
| Belgium; Flanders; Wallonia | The Voice Kids Belgique(French); The Voice Kids Belgium | La Une; VivaCité; Website | Season 1, 2020: Océana Siciliano; Season 2, 2023: Elena Kabongo; Season 3, 2025: Ilena Vigna; Season 4, 2027: Upcoming season | Current; Alice on the Roof (2–); Joseph Kamel (3–); Lorie (4–); Mentissa Aziza (4–)^{7}; Former; Vitaa (1); Slimane (1); Black M (2); Matthew Irons (1–3); Typh Barrow (2–3) | Current; Fanny Jandrain (3–); Robin Soysa (backstage, 3–); Former; Maureen Louys (1–2); Prezzy (backstage, 1); Luana Fontana (backstage, 2) |
| Brazil | The Voice Brasil | Current; SBT (13–); Former; TV Globo (1–12) | Season 1, 2012: Ellen Oléria; Season 2, 2013: Sam Alves; Season 3, 2014: Danilo Reis & Rafael; Season 4, 2015: Renato Vianna; Season 5, 2016: Mylena Jardim; Season 6, 2017: Samantha Ayara; Season 7, 2018: Léo Pain; Season 8, 2019: Tony Gordon; Season 9, 2020: Victor Alves; Season 10, 2021: Giuliano Eriston; Season 11, 2022: Keilla Júnia; Season 12, 2023: Ivan Barreto; Season 13, 2025: Thiago Garcia; Season 14, 2026: Current season; Season 15, 2027: Upcoming season | Current; Matheus & Kauan (duo, 13–); Lauana Prado (14–); Paulo Ricardo (14–); Diogo Nogueira (14–); Priscilla (battles, 14–); Former; Daniel (1–3); Ivete Sangalo (6–8); Claudia Leitte (1–5, 10); Gaby Amarantos (11); Carlinhos Brown (1–7, 9–10, 12); Michel Teló (4–9, 11–12)^{19}; Iza (8–12); Lulu Santos (1–12); Duda Beat (13); Péricles (13); Mumuzinho (13); Comeback Stage; Michel Teló (comeback stage, 10)^{19}; Guest coach; Mumuzinho (blind auditions, 12) | Current; Tiago Leifert (1–10, 13–); Gaby Cabrini (backstage 13–); Former; André Marques (10); Fátima Bernardes (11–12); Miá Mello (backstage, 2); Fernanda Souza (backstage, 3); Daniele Suzuki (backstage, 1, 4); Mariana Rios (backstage, 5–7); Jeniffer Nascimento (backstage, 8–10); Thaís Fersoza (backstage, 11) |
| Brazil | The Voice Kids | TV Globo | Season 1, 2016: Wagner Barreto; Season 2, 2017: Thomas Machado; Season 3, 2018: Eduarda Brasil; Season 4, 2019: Jeremias Reis; Season 5, 2020: Kaue Penna; Season 6, 2021: Gustavo Bardim; Season 7, 2022: Isis Testa; Season 8, 2023: Henrique Lima | Ivete Sangalo (1–2); Victor & Leo (duo, 1–2); Claudia Leitte (3–5); Simone & Simaria (duo, 3–5); Gaby Amarantos (6); Michel Teló (6–7); Maiara & Maraisa (duo, 7); Carlinhos Brown (1–8); Iza (8); Mumuzinho (8); Guest coaches; Mumuzinho (live shows, 5); Toni Garrido (showdowns, 7) | Tiago Leifert (1); André Marques (2–5); Márcio Garcia (6–7); Fátima Bernardes (8); Kika Martinez (backstage, 1); Thalita Rebouças (backstage, 2–7) |
| Brazil | The Voice + | TV Globo | Season 1, 2021: Zé Alexanddre; Season 2, 2022: Vera de Maria Maga | Claudia Leitte (1); Daniel (1); Mumuzinho (1); Ludmilla (1–2); Fafá de Belém (2); Carlinhos Brown (2); Toni Garrido (2) | André Marques (1–2); Thalita Rebouças (backstage, 1); Thaís Fersoza (backstage, 2) |
| Bulgaria | Гласът на България; The Voice of Bulgaria | bTV; Website | Season 1, 2011: Steliyana Hristova; Season 2, 2013: Ivailo Donkov; Season 3, 2014: Kristina Ivanova; Season 4, 2017: Radko Petkov; Season 5, 2018: Nia Petrova; Season 6, 2019: Atanas Kateliev; Season 7, 2020: Georgi Shopov; Season 8, 2021: Petya Paneva; Season 9, 2022: Jacklyn Tarrakci; Season 10, 2023: Nadezhda Kovacheva; Season 11, 2024: Slaveya Ivanova; Season 12, 2026: Current season | Current; Ivan Lechev (4–); Dara (8–); Maria Ilieva (10–); Medi (12–); Former; Ivana (1); Mariana Popova (1); Kiril Marichkov^{†} (1); Preslava (2); Yordan Karadjov (2); Victoria Terziyska (2); Desi Slava (3); Atanas Penev (3); Orlin Goranov (3); Poli Genova (4–5); Kamelia (4–7); Mihaela Fileva (6–7); Galena (8–9); Lubo Kirov (8–9); Miro (1–3, 10); Grafa (4–7, 11) | Current; Vladimir Zombori (11–); Boryana Bratoeva (11–); Former; Victoria Terziyska (main, 1; Live shows, 3); Marten Roberto (Live shows, 1; main, 2–3); Yana Marinova (Live shows, 2); Pavell (4–7); Venci Venc' (4–7); Ivan Tishev (8–10); Emanuela Ivanova (online backstage, 1–3); Gencho «NJOY» Genchev (TV backstage, 1); Todor Georgiev-Toshey (online backstage, 4–5); Elina Markovska (online backstage, 6); Aleksandra Bogdanska (online backstage, 7–8); Preyah (online backstage, 9); Petya Dikova (online backstage, 11) |
| Cambodia | The Voice Cambodia | Hang Meas HDTV | Season 1, 2014: Buth Seiha; Season 2, 2016: Thel Thai; Season 3, 2023: Lim Serey HanNika | Pich Sophea; Chhorn Sovannareach; Aok Sokunkanha; Nop Bayyareth | Chan Keonimol; Chea Vibol (1–2); Rasy Sok (3) |
| Cambodia | The Voice Kids Cambodia | Hang Meas HDTV | Season 1, 2017: Pich Thai; Season 2, 2018: Tep Piseth; Season 3, 2022: Sarum Panhasak | Aok Sokunkanha (1–3); Preap Sovath (1–2); Sokun Nisa (1, 3); Sous Visa (2); Zono (3) | Chea Vibol; Kong Socheat |
| Cambodia | The Voice Teens Cambodia | Hang Meas HDTV | Season 1, 2027: New series | TBA | TBA |
| Canada; Quebec | La Voix^{3} (French); The Voice | TVA | Season 1, 2013: Valérie Carpentier; Season 2, 2014: Yoan Garneau; Season 3, 2015: Kevin Bazinet; Season 4, 2016: Stéphanie St-Jean; Season 5, 2017: Ludovick Bourgeois; Season 6, 2018: Yama Laurent; Season 7, 2019: Geneviève Jodoin; Season 8, 2020: Josiane Comeau; Season 9, 2023: Sophie Grenier; Season 10, 2024: Maude Cyr-Deschênes; Season 11, 2026: Rosemarie Boivin | Current; Corneille (9–); Mario Pelchat (9–); Roxane Bruneau (comeback stage, 9; 10–)^{19}; France D'Amour (10–); Former; Marie-Mai (1); Jean-Pierre Ferland^{†} (1); Louis-Jean Cormier (2); Ariane Moffatt (1, 4); Isabelle Boulay (2–3, 5); Éric Lapointe (2–7); Lara Fabian (6–7); Alex Nevsky (6–7); Julien Clerc (supercoach, 7); Ginette Reno (supercoach, 8); Pierre Lapointe (3–5, 8); Garou (6, 8); Cœur de pirate (8); Marc Dupré (1–5, 7–9); Marjo (9) | Charles Lafortune |
| Canada; Quebec | La Voix Junior (French); The Voice Junior | TVA | Season 1, 2016: Charles Kardos; Season 2, 2017: Sydney Lallier | Marie-Mai (1–2); Marc Dupré (1–2); Alex Nevsky (1–2) | Charles Lafortune |
| Chile | The Voice Chile | Canal 13 (1–2); Chilevisión (3–4) | Season 1, 2015: Luis Pedraza; Season 2, 2016: Javiera Flores; Season 3, 2022: Pablo Rojas; Season 4, 2023: Hadonais Nieves | Franco Simone (1); Nicole (1–2); Luis Fonsi (1–2); Álvaro López (1–2); Ana Torroja (2); Yuri (3); Gente de Zona (duo, 3); Cami (3); Beto Cuevas (3–4); Francisca Valenzuela (4); El Puma (4); Prince Royce (4); Comeback Stage; Gepe (comeback stage, 3)^{19}; Daniela Castillo (comeback stage, 4)^{19} | Sergio Lagos (1–2); Jean Philippe Cretton (1–2); Julian Elfenbein (3–4); Diana Bolocco (4); Emilia Daiber (online host, 3–4) |
| China (Mandarin) | The Voice of China – 中国好声音; The Voice of China – Best Voice of China | Zhejiang TV | Season 1, 2012: Liang Bo; Season 2, 2013: Li Qi; Season 3, 2014: Zhang Bichen; Season 4, 2015: Zhang Lei | Liu Huan^{†} (1); A-mei (2); Yang Kun (1, 3); Chyi Chin (3); Na Ying (1–4); Wang Feng (2–4); Harlem Yu (1–2, 4); Jay Chou (4) | Hu Qiaohua |
| Colombia | La Voz Colombia; The Voice Colombia | Caracol Televisión | Season 1, 2012: Miranda; Season 2, 2013: Camilo Martínez | Carlos Vives (1); Fanny Lú (1–2); Andrés Cepeda (1–2); Ricardo Montaner (1–2); Gilberto Santa Rosa (2) | Linda Palma (1–2); Alejandro Palacio (1–2); Carlos Ponce (1); Diego Sae3nz (backstage, 1–2) |
| Colombia | La Voz Kids; The Voice Kids | Caracol Televisión | Season 1, 2014: Ivanna García; Season 2, 2015: Luis Mario Torres; Season 3, 2018: Juan Sebastian Laverde; Season 4, 2019: Anabelle Campaña; Season 5, 2021: Maria Liz; Season 6, 2022: Diana Camila; Season 7, 2024: Carranga Kids | Current; Andrés Cepeda; Greeicy (7–); Aleks Syntek (7–); Former; Maluma (1–2); Fanny Lú (1–4); Sebastián Yatra (3–4); Natalia Jiménez (5); Jesús Navarro (5); Kany García (6); Nacho (6) | Current; Iván Lalinde (6–); Laura Tobón (3–5, 7–); Former; Linda Palma (1–2); Alejandro Palacio (1–4); Laura Acuña (5–6) |
| Colombia | La Voz Teens; The Voice Teens; Original | Caracol Televisión | Season 1, 2016: Carol Mendoza | Gusi (1); Gloria Martínez (1); Andrés Cepeda (1) | Laura Tobón (1); Karen Martínez (1); Catalina Uribe (backstage, 1) |
| Colombia | La Voz Senior; The Voice Senior | Caracol Televisión | Season 1, 2021: Maria Nelfi Duque; Season 2, 2022: Chencho Trejos | Current; Andrés Cepeda; Kany García (2–); Nacho (2–); Former; Natalia Jiménez (1); Jesús Navarro (1) | Current; Laura Acuña; Iván Lalinde (2–); Former; Laura Tobón (1) |
| Croatia | Current; The Voice Hrvatska(3–); The Voice of Croatia; Former; The Voice – Najljepši glas Hrvatske (1–2); The Voice – The Most Beautiful Voice of Croatia | HRT 1 Website | Season 1, 2015: Nina Kraljić; Season 2, 2016: Ruža Janjiš; Season 3, 2019–20: Vinko Ćemeraš; Season 4, 2023–24: Martin Kosovec; Season 5, 2026–27: Upcoming season | Current; Vanna (3–); Davor Gobac (3–); Dino Jelusick (4–); Damir Urban (4–); Former; Tony Cetinski (1–2); Indira Levak (1–2); Jacques Houdek (1–2); Ivan Dečak (1–3); Massimo Savić^{†} (3) | Iva Šulentić; Ivan Vukušić |
| Croatia | The Voice Kids | HRT 1 Website | Season 1, 2024–25: Marino Vrgoč; Season 2, 2025–26: Nikol Kutnjak | Vanna; Davor Gobac; Mia Dimšić; Marko Tolja | Iva Šulentić; Ivan Vukušić |
| Czech Republic & Slovakia | Hlas Česko Slovenska (1–2); The Voice of Czecho Slovakia; The Voice Česko Slovensko(3) | TV Nova; Website; Markíza; Website | Season 1, 2012: Ivanna Bagová; Season 2, 2014: Lenka Hrůzová; Season 3, 2019: Annamária d'Almeida | Rytmus (1); Dara Rolins (solo, 1); Michal David (1–2); Majk Spirit (2); Dara Rolins & Marta Jandová (duo, 2); Josef Vojtek (1–3); Kali (3); Vojtěch Dyk (3); Jana Kirschner (3) | Leoš Mareš (1–2); Tereza Kerndlová (3); Mária Čírová (3); Tina (backstage, 1–2) |
| Denmark; Faroe Islands; Greenland | Voice – Danmarks største stemme Voice – The Biggest Voice of Denmark^{16} | TV 2 | Season 1, 2011–12: Kim Wagner; Season 2, 2012: Emilie Paevatalu | L.O.C. (1–2); Sharin Foo (1–2); Lene Nystrøm (1–2); Steen Jørgensen (1); Xander (2) | Morten Resen (1); Felix Smith (2); Sigurd Kongshøj Larsen (backstage, 1) |
| Denmark; Faroe Islands; Greenland | Voice Junior | TV 2 (1–5); Kanal 5 (6); Website | Season 1, Spring 2014: Melina Neustrup Nielsen; Season 2, Fall 2014: Aland Mustafa; Season 3, 2015: Isabel Brogaard; Season 4, 2016: Oliver Arndt; Season 5, 2017: Dafne Stilund Nielsen; Season 6, 2019: Camille Haven Beck | Oh Land (1–5); Wafande (1–6); Joey Moe (1–6); Mette Lindberg (6) | Mikkel Kryger (1–5); Emilie Paevatalu (1–2); Amelia Høy (3–4); Stephania Potalivo (5); Ihan Hayder (6); Jacob Riising (6) |
| Dominican Republic | The Voice Dominicana | Telesistema 11 | Season 1, 2021: Yohan Amparo; Season 2, 2022: Adriana Green-Ortiz | Juan Magán (1); Nacho (1); Milly Quezada (1–2); Musicologo The Libro (1–2); Eddy Herrera (2); Alex Matos (2) | Luz García (1–2); Jhoel López (1–2) |
| Ecuador | La Voz Ecuador; The Voice Ecuador | Teleamazonas; Website | Season 1, 2015: Gustavo Vicuña; Season 2, 2016: Antonio Guerrero | Jerry Rivera (1); Marta Sánchez (1); Jorge Villamizar (1); Daniel Betancourth (1–2); Américo (2); Paty Cantú (2); Joey Montana (2) | Carlos Luís Andrade (1–2); Constanza Baez (1); Andrea Hurtado (2) |
| Estonia | The Voice Eesti; The Voice Estonia | TV3 | Season 1, 2027: New series | Sandra Sillamaa; Karl-Erik Taukar; TBA; TBA | Tõnis Niinemets |
| Finland | The Voice of Finland | Nelonen | Season 1, 2011–12: Mikko Sipola; Season 2, 2013: Antti Railio; Season 3, 2014: Siru Airistola; Season 4, 2015: Miia Kosunen; Season 5, 2016: Suvi Åkerman; Season 6, 2017: Saija Saarnisto; Season 7, 2018: Jerkka Virtanen; Season 8, 2019: Markus Salo; Season 9, 2020: Juffi Seponpoika; Season 10, 2021: Kalle Virtanen; Season 11, 2022: Sussu Erkinheimo; Season 12, 2023: Onni Kivipelto; Season 13, 2024: Laura Ruusumaa; Season 14, 2025: Oliver Rosenholm; Season 15, 2026: Jose Carlos; Season 16, 2027: Upcoming season | Current; Elastinen (1–3, 12–); Sanni (13–); Jenni Vartiainen (15–); Sipe Santapukki (solo, 16–); Former; Lauri Tähkä (1–2); Paula Koivuniemi (1–2); Mira Luoti (3); Anne Mattila (3); Tarja Turunen (4–5); Michael Monroe (1–6); Olli Lindholm^{†} (4–8); Toni Wirtanen (solo, 7–8); Redrama (4–10); Juha Tapio (9–11); Anna Puu (6–9, 11–12); Toni Wirtanen & Sipe Santapukki (duo, 9–12); Maija Vilkkumaa (10–14); Arttu Wiskari (13–15); Comeback Stage; Paradise Mikko (comeback stage, 10)^{19} | Current; Heikki Paasonen (5–); Jaana Pelkonen (backstage, 13–); Former; Axl Smith (1–4); Kristiina Komulainen (backstage, 1); Tea Khalifa (backstage, 2); Jenni Alexandrova (backstage, 3–5); Sami Kuronen (knockouts, 11); Elina Kottonen (backstage, 7–12) |
| Finland | The Voice Kids | Nelonen | Season 1, 2013: Molly Rosenström; Season 2, 2014: Aino Morko | Krista Siegfrids (1–2); Elastinen (1); Mira Luoti (1); Arttu Wiskari (2); Diandra Flores (2) | Axl Smith (1–2); Tea Khalifa (1–2) |
| Finland | The Voice All Stars^{29} | Nelonen | Season 1, 2021: Andrea Brosio | Elastinen; Tarja Turunen; Michael Monroe | Heikki Paasonen |
| Finland | The Voice Senior | Nelonen | Season 1, 2022: Jaska Mäkynen | Michael Monroe; Tarja Turunen; Ressu Redford | Heikki Paasonen; Elina Kottonen |
| France | The Voice – La plus belle voix^{12} The Voice – The Most Beautiful Voice | TF1; Website | Season 1, 2012: Stéphan Rizon; Season 2, 2013: Yoann Fréget; Season 3, 2014: Kendji Girac; Season 4, 2015: Lilian Renaud; Season 5, 2016: Slimane Nebchi; Season 6, 2017: Lisandro Cuxi; Season 7, 2018: Maëlle Pistoia; Season 8, 2019: Whitney Marin; Season 9, 2020: Abi Bernadoth; Season 10, 2021: Marghe Davico; Season 11, 2022: Nour Brousse; Season 12, 2023: Aurélien Vivos; Season 13, 2024: Alphonse; Season 14, 2025: Il Cello; Season 15, 2026: Lady O; Season 16, 2027: Upcoming season | Current; Tayc (15–); Mika (3–8, 13, 16–); Marine (16–); Suzane (16–); Former; Louis Bertignac (1–2); Garou (1–3, 5); Matt Pokora (6); Soprano (8); Julien Clerc (8); Jenifer (1–4, 8); Pascal Obispo (7, 9); Marc Lavoine (9–11); Zazie (4–7, 12–13); Bigflo & Oli (duo, 12–13); Vianney (10–14); Zaz (14); Patricia Kaas (14); Florent Pagny (1–7, 10–11, 14–15); Amel Bent (9–12, 15); Lara Fabian (9, 15); Comeback Stage; Nolwenn Leroy (comeback stage, 11); Camille Lellouche (comeback stage, 13)^{19} | Current; Nikos Aliagas; Anaïs Grangerac (backstage 14–); Former; Virginie de Clausade (backstage, 1); Karine Ferri (backstage, 2–10) |
| France | The Voice Kids | TF1; Website | Season 1, 2014: Carla Georges; Season 2, 2015: Jane Constance; Season 3, 2016: Manuela Diaz; Season 4, 2017: Angélina Nava; Season 5, 2018: Emma Cerchi; Season 6, 2019: Soan Arhimann; Season 7, 2020: Rébecca Sayaque; Season 8, 2022: Raynaud Sadon; Season 9, 2023: Durel Loumouamou; Season 10, 2024: Tim; Season 11, 2025: Charlotte Deseigne; Season 12, 2026: Nelson Charles; Season 13, 2027: Upcoming season | Current; Patrick Fiori (2–); Soprano (5–7, 11–); Matt Pokora (3–4, 11–); Santa (11–); Former; Garou (1); Louis Bertignac (1–2); Amel Bent (5–6); Jenifer (1–7); Louane (8); Julien Doré (8); Kendji Girac (7–9); Nolwenn Leroy (9); Slimane (9–10); Claudio Capéo (10); Lara Fabian (10) | Current; Nikos Aliagas; Styleto (12–); Former; Karine Ferri (1–11) |
| France | The Voice : All-Stars^{29} Original | TF1; Website | Season 1, 2021: Anne Sila | Florent Pagny; Mika; Zazie; Jenifer; Patrick Fiori | Nikos Aliagas; Karine Ferri |
| Georgia | ახალი ქართული ხმა (1–2); New Georgian Voice; The Voice საქართველო(3–); The Voice Georgia | Imedi TV (1–3); 1tv (4–) | Season 1, 2012–13: Salome Katamadze; Season 2, 2013–14: Mariam Chachkhiani; Season 3, 2015–16: Giorgi Nadibaidze; Season 4, 2021: Magda Ivanishvili; Season 5, 2022–23: Iru Khechanovi; Season 6, 2026–27: Upcoming season | Current; Dato Porchkhidze (1–2, 5–); Sopho Khalvashi (6–); Giorgi Datiashvili (6–)^{33}; Former; Nino Chkheidze (1); Merab Sepashvili (1); Maia Darsmelidze & Stephane Mgebrishvili (duo, 1); Lela Tsurtsumia (2); Maia Darsmelidze (solo, 2); Keti Topuria (3); Anri Jokhadze (3); Nodiko Tatishvili (3); Nutsa Shanshiashvili (3); Niaz Diasamidze (4); Salome Korkotashvili (4); Nikoloz Rachveli (4); Stephane Mgebrishvili (solo, 2, 4–5); Sopho Toroshelidze (5); Dato Evgenidze (5) | Current; TBA (6–); Former; Duta Skhirtladze (1–3); Anna Imedashvili (1–3); Ruska Makashvili (4); Gvantsa Daraselia (5) |
| Georgia | ახალი საბავშო ხმა New Kids Voice | Imedi TV | Season 1, 2013: Reziko Didebashvili | Eka Kakhiani (1); Dato Porchkhidze (1); Stephane Mgebrishvili (1) | Samory Balde (1); Ruska Makashvili (1) |
| Germany | The Voice of Germany | ProSieben; Sat.1; Website | Season 1, 2011–12: Ivy Quainoo; Season 2, 2012: Nick Howard; Season 3, 2013: Andreas Kümmert; Season 4, 2014: Charley Ann Schmutzler; Season 5, 2015: Jamie-Lee Kriewitz; Season 6, 2016: Tay Schmedtmann; Season 7, 2017: Natia Todua; Season 8, 2018: Samuel Rösch; Season 9, 2019: Claudia Emmanuela Santoso; Season 10, 2020: Paula Dalla Corte; Season 11, 2021: Sebastian Krenz; Season 12, 2022: Anny Ogrezeanu; Season 13, 2023: Malou Lovis Kreyelkamp; Season 14, 2024: Jennifer Lynn; Season 15, 2025: Anne Mosters; Season 16, 2026: Current season; Season 17, 2027: Upcoming season | Current; Rea Garvey (solo, 1–2, 4–5, 9, 12, 15–); Michi Beck & Smudo (duo, 4–8, 15–); Nico Santos (10–11, 15–); Shirin David (13, 15–); Former; Xavier Naidoo (1–2); The BossHoss (duo, 1–3); Nena (1–3); Max Herre (3); Andreas Bourani (5–6); Michael Patrick Kelly (8); Sido (9); Alice Merton (9); Samu Haber & Rea Garvey (duo, 10); Yvonne Catterfeld & Stefanie Kloß (duo, 10); Sarah Connor (11); Johannes Oerding (11); Stefanie Kloß (solo, 4–5, 12); Peter Maffay (12); Giovanni Zarrella (13); Bill Kaulitz & Tom Kaulitz (duo, 13); Ronan Keating (13); Samu Haber (solo, 3–4, 6–7, 14); Mark Forster (7–12, 14); Yvonne Catterfeld (solo, 6–8, 14); Kamrad (14); Comeback Stage; Nico Santos (comeback stage, 9)^{19}; Michael Schulte (comeback stage, 10)^{19}; Elif Demirezer (comeback stage, 11)^{19}; Calum Scott (comeback stage, 15)^{19} | Current; Melissa Khalaj (11–); Matthias Killing (16–); Former; Stefan Gödde (1); Thore Schölermann (2–15); Annemarie Carpendale (10); Lena Gercke (5–11); Steven Gätjen (11); Doris Golpashin (backstage, 1–4) |
| Germany | The Voice Kids | Sat.1; Website | Season 1, 2013: Michèle Bircher; Season 2, 2014: Danyiom Mesmer; Season 3, 2015: Noah-Levi Korth; Season 4, 2016: Lukas Janisch; Season 5, 2017: Sofie Thomas; Season 6, 2018: Anisa Celik; Season 7, 2019: Mimi & Josy; Season 8, 2020: Lisa-Marie Ramm; Season 9, 2021: Egon Werler; Season 10, 2022: Georgia Balke; Season 11, 2023: Emma Filipović; Season 12, 2024: Jakob Hebgen; Season 13, 2025: Neo Klingl; Season 14, 2026: Katelyn Harrington; Season 15, 2027: Upcoming season | Current; Mark Forster (3–7, 15–); Wincent Weiss (9–13, 15–); Ayliva (13, 15–); Former; Tim Bendzko (1); Henning Wehland (1–2); Johannes Strate (2–3); Nena & Larissa Kerner (duo, 5–6); The BossHoss (duo, 7); Sasha Schmitz (4–5, 8); Max Giesinger (6, 8); Deine Freunde (duo, 8); Michi Beck & Smudo (duo, 9–12); Lena Meyer-Landrut (1–4, 7–8, 10–12); Stefanie Kloß (7, 9, 13); Clueso (13); HE/RO (duo, 14); Álvaro Soler (9–12, 14); Leony (14); Michael Patrick Kelly (14) | Current; Andrea Kaiser (15–); Former; Thore Schölermann (1–13); Chantal Janzen (3–4); Debbie Schippers (5–6); Melissa Khalaj (7–14); Aline von Drateln (backstage, 1); Nela Lee (backstage, 2); Marc van Velzen (backstage-online, 1–3); Noah-Levi Korth (backstage-online, 4); Jonas Ems (backstage-online, 5); Iggi Kelly (backstage-online, 7); Mimi & Josy (backstage-online, 8); Keanu Rapp (backstage-online, 9–10); Egon Werler (backstage-online, 10); Chiara Castelli (backstage-online, 11–12) |
| Germany | The Voice Senior | Sat.1; Website | Season 1, 2018–19: Dan Lucas; Season 2, 2019: Monika Smets | Mark Forster (1); Sasha Schmitz (1–2); The BossHoss (duo, 1–2); Yvonne Catterfeld (1–2); Michael Patrick Kelly (2) | Lena Gercke (1–2); Thore Schölermann (1–2) |
| Germany | The Voice Rap^{32} | ProSieben; Joyn | Season 1, 2023: Leon "Ezo" Weick | Kool Savas; Dardan | Thore Schölermann |
| Greece; Cyprus | The Voice of Greece^{4} | Current; Skai TV (3–); Sigma TV (3–); Former; ANT1 (1–2) | Season 1, 2014: Maria Elena Kiriakou; Season 2, 2015: Kostas Ageris; Season 3, 2016–17: Giannis Margaris; Season 4, 2017: Yiorgos Zioris; Season 5, 2018: Lemonia Beza; Season 6, 2019: Dimitris Karagiannis; Season 7, 2020–21: Ioanna Georgakopoulou; Season 8, 2021: Anna Argyrou; Season 9, 2022–23: Maria Sakellari; Season 10, 2024–25: Sofia Chistoforidou; Season 11, 2025: Konstantinos Komodromos; Season 12, 2026–27: Current season | Current; Panos Mouzourakis (3–); Helena Paparizou (3–); Christos Mastoras (10–); Paola (12–); Former; Antonis Remos (1–2); Despina Vandi (1–2); Melina Aslanidou (1–2); Michalis Kouinelis (1–2); Kostis Maraveyas (3–5); Eleonora Zouganeli (6–7); Sakis Rouvas (3–9); Konstantinos Argyros (8–9); Giorgos Mazonakis† (10–11) | Current; Giorgos Lianos (6–9, 12–); Former; Giorgos Liagkas (1–2); Doukissa Nomikou (7); Fay Skorda (9); Giorgos Kapoutzidis (3–5, 10–11); Themis Georgantas (backstage, 1–2); Elena Tsagrinou (backstage, 3); Christina Bompa (backstage, 6); Laura Narjes (backstage, 4–5, 7); Valia Hatzitheodwrou (backstage, 8–9) |
| Greece; Cyprus | The Voice Kids | ANT1 | 2014–15: Cancelled | —N/a | —N/a |
| Hungary | The Voice – Magyarország hangja (1); The Voice – Voice of Hungary; The Voice Magyarország (2); The Voice of Hungary | TV2 (1); RTL (2) | Season 1, 2012–13: Dénes Pál; Season 2, 2023: Erika Szakács | Mihály Mező (1); Tamás Somló^{†} (1); Andrea Malek (1); "Caramel" Ferenc Molnár (1); Curtis (2); Erika Miklósa (2); Nóra Trokán (2); Manuel (2) | Tamás Szabó Kimmel (1); Bence Istenes (2); Miklós Bányai (backstage, 1) |
| Iceland | The Voice Ísland; The Voice Iceland | Sjónvarp Símans | Season 1, 2015: Hjörtur Traustason; Season 2, 2016–17: Karitas Harpa Davíðsdóttir | Helgi Björnsson (1–2); Salka Sól Eyfeld (1–2); Svala Björgvinsdóttir (1–2); Unnsteinn Manuel Stefánsson (1–2) | Sigvaldi Kaldalóns (1–2); Svavar Örn Svavarsson (1–2) |
| India | The Voice India^{21} | &TV (1–2); StarPlus (3) | Season 1, 2015: Pawandeep Rajan; Season 2, 2016–17: Farhan Sabir; Season 3, 2019: Sumit Saini | Shaan (1–2); Mika Singh (1); Sunidhi Chauhan (1); Himesh Reshammiya (1); Neeti Mohan (2); Benny Dayal (2); Salim Merchant (2); Adnan Sami (3); Armaan Malik (3); Kanika Kapoor (3); Harshdeep Kaur (3); A. R. Rahman (3, supercoach) | Karan Tacker (1); Sugandha Mishra (2); Divyanka Tripathi (3) |
| India | The Voice India Kids | &TV; Website | Season 1, 2016: Nishtha Sharma; Season 2, 2017–18: Manashi Saharia | Neeti Mohan (1); Shekhar Ravjiani (1); Shaan (1–2); Papon (2); Palak Muchhal (2); Himesh Reshammiya (2) | Jay Bhanushali (1–2); Sugandha Mishra (1–2) |
| Indonesia | The Voice Indonesia^{23} | Indosiar (1); RCTI (2); GTV (3–4); Website | Season 1, 2013: Billy Simpson; Season 2, 2016: Mario G. Klau; Season 3, 2018–19: Ronaldo Longa; Season 4, 2019: Vionita Veronika | Sherina Munaf (1); Glenn Fredly^{†} (1); Giring Ganesha (1); Ari Lasso (2); Agnez Mo (2); Kaka (2); Judika (2); Anggun (3); Armand Maulana (1, 3–4); Titi DJ (3–4); Vidi Aldiano^{†} & Nino Baskoro (duo, 3–4); Isyana Sarasvati (4); Comeback Stage; Gamaliel Tapiheru (comeback stage, 4) | Darius Sinathriya (1); Daniel Mananta (2); Ananda Omesh (3–4); Fenita Arie (backstage, 1); Conchita Caroline (backstage, 1); Astrid Tiar (backstage, 3); Gracia Indri (backstage, 4) |
| Indonesia | The Voice Kids Indonesia | GTV; Website | Season 1, 2016: Christopher Edgar; Season 2, 2017: Sharla Martiza; Season 3, 2018: Keva Hamzah; Season 4, 2021: Nikita Mawarni | Bebi Romeo (1–2); Muhammad Tulus (1–2); Agnez Mo (1–3); Kaka (3); Marcell Siahaan (3–4); Isyana Sarasvati (4); Yura Yunita & Rizky Febian (duo, 4) | Ananda Omesh; Dian Ayu Lestari (backstage, 3); Ersa Mayori (backstage, 1–2, 4); Kaneishia Yusuf (online, 2); Kimberley Fransa (online, 3); Okky Lukman (guest, 4) |
| Indonesia | The Voice All Stars | GTV; Website | Season 1, 2022: Jogi Simanjuntak | Armand Maulana; Titi DJ; Vidi Aldiano^{†} & Nino Baskoro (duo); Isyana Sarasvati | Robby Purba |
| Iran | The Voice Persia | MBC Persia | Season 1, 2023: Amin Yahyazadeh | Bijan Mortazavi; Leila Forouhar; Sogand Soheili; Kamyar | Hamed Nikpay |
| Ireland | The Voice of Ireland | RTÉ One | Season 1, 2012: Pat Byrne; Season 2, 2013: Keith Hanley; Season 3, 2014: Brendan McCahey; Season 4, 2015: Patrick Donoghue; Season 5, 2016: Michael Lawson | Brian Kennedy (1); Sharon Corr (1–2); Jamelia (2–3); Dolores O'Riordan^{†} (3); Kian Egan (1–5); Bressie (1–5); Rachel Stevens (4–5); Una Healy (4–5) | Kathryn Thomas (1–5); Eoghan McDermott (1–5) |
| Israel | The Voice ישראל; The Voice Israel | Channel 13; Reshet; Website | Season 1, 2012: Kathleen Reiter; Season 2, 2012–13: Lina Makhul; Season 3, 2014: Elkana Marziano; Season 4, 2016–17: Sapir Saban; Season 5, 2019: Amit Shauli; Season 6, 2026: Emma Ziza Cohen | Rami Kleinstein (1); Yuval Banay & Shlomi Bracha (duo, 2); Sarit Hadad (1–3); Mosh Ben-Ari (3); Miri Mesika (4); Avraham Tal (4); Aviv Geffen (1–4); Shlomi Shabat (solo, 1–4); Ivri Lider (5); Nasreen Qadri (5); Doron Medalie (5); Shlomi Shabat & Yuval Dayan (duo, 5); Noa Kirel (6); Idan Raichel (6); Eden Ben Zaken (6); Static (6) | Michael Aloni; Shlomit Malka (4); Sivan Klein (backstage, 1); Mor Silver (backstage, 1–3) |
| Israel | The Voice All Stars | Channel 13; Reshet; Website | Season 1, 2026: Daniel Barzilay | Noa Kirel; Idan Raichel; Eden Ben Zaken; Static | Michael Aloni |
| Italy | The Voice of Italy^{11} | Rai 2 Rai HD; Website | Season 1, 2013: Elhaida Dani; Season 2, 2014: Suor Cristina Scuccia; Season 3, 2015: Fabio Curto; Season 4, 2016: Alice Paba; Season 5, 2018: Maryam Tancredi; Season 6, 2019: Carmen Pierri | Riccardo Cocciante (1); Noemi (1–3); Piero Pelù (1–3); Roby & Francesco Facchinetti (duo, 3); Raffaella Carrà^{†} (1–2, 4); Dolcenera (4); Emis Killa (4); Max Pezzali (4); J-Ax (2–3, 5); Al Bano (5); Cristina Scabbia (5); Francesco Renga (5); Morgan (6); Gué Pequeno (6); Elettra Lamborghini (6); Gigi D'Alessio (6) | Fabio Troiano (1); Federico Russo (2–4); Costantino della Gherardesca (5); Simona Ventura (6); Carolina Di Domenico (backstage, 1); Valentina Correani (backstage, 2–3); Alessandra Angeli (backstage, 4) |
| Italy | The Voice Senior | Rai 1 | Season 1, 2020: Erminio Sinni; Season 2, 2021–22: Annibale Giannarelli; Season 3, 2023: Maria Teresa Reale; Season 4, 2024: Diana Puddu; Season 5, Spring 2025: Patrizia Conte; Season 6, Fall 2025: Francesco De Siena; Season 7, 2026: Giovanni Scribano | Current; Arisa (4–); Clementino & Rocco Hunt (duo, 6–); Nek (6–); Fiorella Mannoia (7–); Former; Al Bano & Jasmine Carrisi (duo, 1); Orietta Berti (2); Ricchi e Poveri (duo, 3); Clementino (solo, 1–5); Gigi D'Alessio (1–5); Loredana Bertè (1–6) | Antonella Clerici |
| Italy | The Voice Kids | Rai 1 | Season 1, Spring 2023: Melissa Agliottone; Season 2, Fall 2023: Simone Grande; Season 3, 2024: Melissa Memeti; Season 4, 2026: Matteo Trullu; Season 5, 2027: Upcoming season | Current; Loredana Bertè; Arisa (2–); Clementino & Rocco Hunt (duo, 4–); Nek (4–); Former; Ricchi e Poveri (duo, 1); Gigi D'Alessio (1–3); Clementino (solo, 1–3) | Antonella Clerici |
| Italy | The Voice Generations | Rai 1 | Season 1, 2024: Gino & Noemi; Season 2, 2026: Jessica & Gilda | Current; Loredana Bertè; Arisa; Clementino & Rocco Hunt (duo, 2–); Nek (2–); Former; Gigi D'Alessio (1); Clementino (solo, 1) | Antonella Clerici |
| Japan | The Voice Japan | TV Tokyo; Website | Season 1, 2023: Yurina Koyanagi | Yuuri; Maximum The Ryokun; Izumi Nakasone; Shikao Suga | Jay Kabira |
| Kazakhstan | Current; The Voicе Қазақстан (7–); Former; Қазақстан Дауысы (1–3); The Voice of Kazakhstan; Голос Казахстана (4); The Voice Kazakhstan; Qazaqstan дауысы (5–6); The Voice of Kazakhstan | Current; Khabar (7–); Former; Perviy Kanal Evraziya (4); Qazaqstan TV (1–3, 5–6) | Season 1, 2013–14: Shaharizat Seidakhmet; Season 2, 2014–15: Bauyrzhan Retbaev; Season 3, 2015: Murat Xayrolda; Season 4, 2016–17: Dinmuhammed Dauletov; Season 5, 2021: Quralay Meyrambek; Season 6, 2023: Musa Marat; Season 7, 2025: Nurai Mykty | Current; Meirambek Besbaev (7–); Bagym Mukhitdenova & Bayan Alaguzova (duo 7–); Baigali Serkebayev (7–); TURAR (7–); Former; Medeu Arynbaev (1–2); Nurlan Alban (1–3); Almas Kishkenbayev (1–3); Madina Saduakasova (1–3); Rustem Nurzhigit (3); Ali Okapov (4); Eva Becher (4); Nurlan Abdullin (4); Zhanna Orynbasarova (4); Saken Maigaziyev (5); Alem (5); Mayra Muhammad (5); Marzhan Arapbayeva (5–6); Zhanar Dugalova (6); Rakhym Kuandyk (6); Tolegen Mukhamejanov (6) | Current; Tursynbek Qabatov (7–); Maqsat Rahmet (finale, 7); Former; Azamat Satybaldy (1–3); Chingiz Kapin (4); Galym Kenshilik (5; finale, 6); Taukel Musilim (5); Jubanish Jeksen (6); Irina Ten (6) |
| Kazakhstan | Голос Дети Казахстана^{14} (1); The Voice Kids Kazakhstan; Qazaqstan дауысы. Балалар (2–3); The Voice of Kazakhstan. Kids | Perviy Kanal Evraziya (1); Qazaqstan TV (2–3) | Season 1, 2017: Daniil Yun; Season 2, 2022: Ersultan Omar; Season 3, 2023: Nurshat Kusanova | Ali Okapov (1); Eva Becher (1); Zhanna Orynbasarova (1); Marzhan Arapbayeva (2); Dastan Orazbekov (2); Zhanar Dugalova (2); Jubanish Jeksen (2–3); Alem (3); Tolkyn Zabirova (3); Marhaba Sabi (3)^{7} | Chingiz Kapin (1); Galym Kenshilik (2–3); Gulnur Orazymbetova (backstage, 2); Zhuldyz Omirgali (backstage, 3) |
| Lithuania | Lietuvos Balsas; The Voice of Lithuania | LNK | Season 1, 2012: Julija Jegorova; Season 2, 2013–14: Paulius Bagdanavičius; Season 3, 2014–15: Justina Budaitė; Season 4, 2015–16: Kotryna Juodzevičiūtė; Season 5, 2017–18: Monika Marija Paulauskaitė; Season 6, 2018: Gerda Šukytė; Season 7, 2020: Evita Cololo; Season 8, 2021: Meidė Šlamaitė; Season 9, 2023: Anyanya Udongwo; Season 10, 2024–25: Sidas Gvozdiovas; Season 11, 2026: Current season | Current; Mantas Jankavičius (9–); Monika Liu (7–9, 11–); Žemaitukai (duo, 11–); Aistè (11–); Former; Violeta Tarasovienė (1); Egidijus Sipavičius (1); Jurgis Didžiulis & Erica Jennings (duo, 1); Merūnas Vitulskis (1–3); Katažina Nemycko (2–3); Arūnas Valinskas & Inga Valinskienė (duo, 2–3); Rūta Ščiogolevaitė (4); Aleksandras Ivanauskas-Fara (4); Renata Norvilė & Deivis Norvilas (duo, 4); Džordana Butkutė (5); Leon Somov (5–6); Inga Jankauskaitė (5–6); Donatas Montvydas (2–8); Moniqué (7–8); Justinas Jarutis (6–9); Benas Aleksandravičius (9–10); Gabrielė Vilkickytė (10); Jessica Shy (10); Free Finga (comeback stage, 10) | Current; Rolandas Mackevičius (4–); Eglė Jurgaitytė (backstage, 10–); Former; Vytautas Rumšas Jr. (1); Inga Jankauskaitė (2–3); Rolandas Vilkončius (2–3); Jonas Nainys (4); Žygimantas Barysas (backstage, 1); Santa Audickaitė (backstage, 2–3); Šarūnas Kirdeikis (backstage, 2–3); Agnė Juškėnaitė (backstage, 4–5); Ignas Lelys (backstage, 6); Karolina Meschino (backstage, 7); KaYra (backstage, 8–9) |
| Lithuania | Lietuvos balsas. Vaikai; The Voice of Lithuania. Kids | LNK | Season 1, 2019: Milėja Stankevičiūtė; Season 2, 2020: Matas Saukantas; Season 3, 2021: Džiugas Joneikis | Monika Marija (1–2); Donatas Montvydas (1–3); Mantas Jankavičius (1–3); Moniqué (3) | Rolandas Mackevičius (1–3); Karolina Meschino (backstage, 2–3) |
| Lithuania | Lietuvos balsas. Senjorai; The Voice of Lithuania. Senior | LNK | Season 1, 2019: Gedeminas Jepšas | Monika Marija; Justinas Jarutis; Inga Jankauskaitė; Mantas Jankavičius | Rolandas Mackevičius; Karolina Meschino |
| Lithuania | Lietuvos Balsas. Kartos; The Voice of Lithuania. Generations | LNK | Season 1, 2022: Hey! Mix; Season 2, 2024: T3 | Current; Vaidas Baumila; Benas Aleksandravičius; Nomeda Kazlaus (2–); Gabrielė Vilkickytė (2–); Former; Ieva Prudnikovaitė (1); 69 Danguje (trio, 1)^{17} | Current; Rolandas Mackevičius; Eglė Jurgaitytė (backstage, 2–); Former; Ieva Mackevičienė (backstage, 1) |
| Malaysia; Singapore | The Voice – 决战好声; The Voice – Battle for the Best Voice | StarHub TV E City; Astro AEC | Season 1, 2017: Lim Wen Suen | Sky Wu (1); Ding Dang (1); Gary Chaw (1); Hanjin Tan (1) | Siow Hui Mei (1); Wong Woon Hong (1) |
| Malta | The Voice Kids^{25} | TVM | Season 1, 2022–23: Dawn Desire; Season 2, 2025: Eliza Borg; Season 3, 2026: Beppe Caruana | Current; Destiny Chukunyere; Aleandro Spiteri Monsigneur (3–); Gaia Cauchi (3–); Former; Owen Leuellen (1); Gianluca Bezzina (1–2); Sarah Bonnici (2) | Current; Maxine Pace (2–); Former; Sarah Bajada (1) |
| Malta | The Voice Senior | TVM | Season 1, 2024: Cancelled | TBA | TBA |
| Mexico | La Voz... México (1–7); The Voice... Mexico; La Voz (8–11); The Voice | Las Estrellas (1–7); Website; Azteca Uno (8–11); Website | Season 1, 2011: Oscar Cruz; Season 2, 2012: Luz Maria; Season 3, 2013: Marcos Razo; Season 4, 2014: Guido Rochin; Season 5, 2016: Yuliana Martínez; Season 6, 2017: Luis Adrián Cruz; Season 7, 2018: Cristina Ramos; Season 8, 2019: Fatima Dominguez; Season 9, 2020: Fernando Sujo; Season 10, 2021: Sherlyn Sánchez; Season 11, 2022: Fátima Elizondo | Lucero (1); Aleks Syntek (1); Espinoza Paz (1); Beto Cuevas (2); Jenni Rivera^{†} (2); Paulina Rubio (2); Marco Antonio Solís (3); Wisin & Yandel (duo, 3); Alejandra Guzmán (3); Ricky Martin (4); Julión Álvarez (4); J Balvin (5); Gloria Trevi (5); Los Tigres del Norte (duo, 5); Alejandro Sanz (1, 5); Laura Pausini (4, 6); Yuri (4, 6); Carlos Vives (6); Maluma (6–7); Carlos Rivera (7); Anitta (7); Natalia Jiménez (7); Yahir (8); Lupillo Rivera (8); Ricardo Montaner (8–9); Belinda (8–9); Christian Nodal (9); María José (9–10); Edith Márquez (10); Jesús Navarro (10); Miguel Bosé (2, 10); David Bisbal (3, 11); Yuridia (11); Ha*Ash (duo, 11); Joss Favela (11) | Mark Tacher (1); Jacqueline Bracamontes (2–6); Lele Pons (7); Jimena Pérez (8); Eddy Vilard (9–11); Cynthia Urías (backstage, 1–2); Lidia Ávila (backstage, 3); Paty Cantú (backstage, 4); Natalia Téllez (backstage, 5); Odalys Ramírez (backstage, 6–7); Sofía Aragón (backstage, 9–11) |
| Mexico | La Voz Kids; The Voice Kids | Las Estrellas (1–2); Azteca Uno (3–4); Website | Season 1, 2017: Eduardo Barba; Season 2, 2019: Roberto Xavier; Season 3, 2021: Randy Ortiz; Season 4, 2022: Kevin Aguilar | Maluma (1); Emmanuel & Mijares (duo, 1); Rosario Flores (1); Carlos Rivera (2); Lucero (2); Melendi (2); Belinda (3); María José (3); Camilo (3); Mau y Ricky (duo, 3–4); Paty Cantú (4); Joss Favela (4); María León (4)^{7} | Yuri (1–2); Eddy Vilard (3–4); Olivia Peralta (backstage, 1–2) |
| Mexico | La Voz Senior; The Voice Senior | Azteca Uno; Website | Season 1, 2019: Salvador Rivera; Season 2, 2021: Omar Alexander | Lupillo Rivera (1); Ricardo Montaner (1–2); Belinda (1–2); Yahir (1–2); María José (2) | Jimena Pérez (1); Eddy Vilard (2) |
| Mongolia | The Voice of Mongolia | Mongol TV; Website | Season 1, 2018: Enguun Tseyendash; Season 2, 2020: Yadam Khurelmunkh; Season 3, 2022: Davaadalai Gerelt-Od; Season 4, 2025–26: E.Amin-Erdene | Current; Uka; Baachka (4–); Big Gee (4–); Naagii (4–); Former; Ononbat Sed (1–2); Bold Dorjsuren (1–3); Otgonbayar Damba (1–3); Naranzun Badruugan (3) | Ankhbayar Ganbold; Uuganbayar Enkhbat |
| Mongolia | The Voice Kids | Mongol TV; Website | Season 1, 2024: E.Chinguun; Season 2, 2027: Upcoming season | Current; TBA (2–); TBA (2–); TBA (2–); Former; Uka 1); Naagii 1); ThunderZ 1) | Uuganbayar Enkhbat; Sansarmaa Battur |
| Myanmar | The Voice Myanmar | MRTV-4 | Season 1, 2018: Ngwe Soe; Season 2, 2019: Novem Htoo; Season 3, 2020: Nool | Lynn Lynn (1); Kyar Pauk (1–3); Yan Yan Chan (1–3); Ni Ni Khin Zaw (1–3); R Zarni (2–3) | Tayzar Kyaw |
| Nepal | The Voice of Nepal | Current; Himalaya Television (2–); Former; Kantipur (1); Kantipur HD (1); Website | Season 1, 2018: CD Vijaya Adhikari; Season 2, 2019: Ram Limbu; Season 3, 2021: Kiran Gajmer; Season 4, 2022: Karan Rai; Season 5, 2023–24: Binod Rai; Season 6, 2025: Proshesh Pandey; Season 7, 2025–26: Nita Kumari Thapa Sanjita; Season 8, 2026–27: Current season | Current; Pramod Kharel (1–5, 7–); Milan Newar (5, 8–); Naren Limbu (8–); Ekdev Limbu (8–); Former; Sanup Paudel (1); Abhaya Subba (1); Astha Raut (2); Deep Shrestha (1–3); Trishna Gurung (3); Prabisha Adhikari (4); Rajesh Payal Rai (4–5); Uday Sotang (5–6); Khem Century (6–7); Raju Lama (2–4, 6–7); Melina Rai (6–7) | Current; Sushil Nepal; Former; Oshin Sitaula (1) |
| Nepal | The Voice Kids | Himalaya Television | Season 1, 2021–22: Jenish Upreti; Season 2, 2023: Spandan Subba; Season 3, 2024: Anuhya Tamang; Season 4, 2025: Sonali Rajbhandari; Season 5, 2026: Subashna Khadka | Current; Milan Newar; Satya Raj Acharya (4–); Arjun Sapkota (5–); Wangden Sherpa (5–)^{7}; Former; Raju Lama (1); Prabisha Adhikari (1–2); Sushant KC (2); Pramod Kharel (1–3); Chhewang Lama (3); Melina Rai (3–4); Khem Century (4) | Sushil Nepal (1–2, 4–); Roneeshma Shrestha (3–) |
| Netherlands (Original) | The Voice of Holland; Original | RTL 4 Website | Season 1, 2010–11: Ben Saunders†; Season 2, 2011–12: Iris Kroes; Season 3, 2012: Leona Philippo; Season 4, 2013: Julia van der Toorn; Season 5, 2014: OG3NE; Season 6, 2015–16: Maan de Steenwinkel; Season 7, 2016–17: Pleun Bierbooms; Season 8, 2017–18: Jim van der Zee; Season 9, 2018–19: Dennis van Aarssen; Season 10, 2019–20: Sophia Kruithof; Season 11, 2020–21: Dani van Velthoven; Season 12, 2022: Cancelled; Season 13, 2026: Ruben Hillen; Season 14, 2027: Upcoming season | Current; Ilse DeLange (4–5, 13–); Willie Wartaal (13–); Suzan & Freek (duo, 13–); Dinand Woesthoff (13–); Snelle & Domien Verschuuren (duo, comeback stage, 14–)^{19}; Former; Jeroen van der Boom (1); Angela Groothuizen (1–2); Nick & Simon (duo, 1–3); Roel van Velzen (1–3); Trijntje Oosterhuis (3–5); Marco Borsato (2–6); Guus Meeuwis (7); Sanne Hans (6–8); Lil' Kleine (9–10); Jan Smit (11); Anouk (6, 8–12); Ali B (4–12); Waylon (7–12); Glennis Grace (12); Typhoon & Maan (duo, comeback stage, 12)^{19} | Current; Chantal Janzen (10–); Edson da Graça (13–); Martijn Krabbé (13–, voice-over only); Former; Martijn Krabbé (1–12); Wendy van Dijk (1–9); Winston Gerschtanowitz (backstage, 1–4); Geraldine Kemper (backstage, 10–12); Jamai Loman (backstage, 5–9, 12) |
| Netherlands (Original) | The Voice Kids^{7} Original | RTL 4 Website | Season 1, 2012: Fabiënne Bergmans; Season 2, 2012–13: Laura van Kaam; Season 3, 2013–14: Ayoub Maach; Season 4, 2015: Lucas van Roekel; Season 5, 2016: Ésmée Schreurs; Season 6, 2017: Iris Verhoek; Season 7, 2018: Yosina Roemajauw; Season 8, 2019: Silver Metz; Season 9, 2020: Dax Hovius; Season 10, 2021: Emma Kok; Season 11, 2026–27: Current season; Season 12, 2027: Upcoming season | Current; Ilse DeLange (5–8, 10–); Flemming (11–); Emma Heesters (11–); Claude (11–); Former; Angela Groothuizen (1–4); Nick & Simon (duo, 1–4); Douwe Bob (7); Marco Borsato (1–9); Anouk (8–9); Ali B (5–10); Sanne Hans (9–10); Snelle (10) | Current; Jamai Loman (9–); Quinty Misiedjan (11–); Former; Wendy van Dijk (1–8); Martijn Krabbé (1–10) |
| Netherlands (Original) | The Voice Senior; Original | RTL 4 Website | Season 1, 2018: Jimi Bellmartin^{†}; Season 2, 2019: Ruud Hermans; Season 3, 2020: Henny Thijssen; Season 4, 2021: Phil Bee | Geer & Goor (duo, 1); Marco Borsato (1–2); Ilse DeLange (1–4); Angela Groothuizen (1–4); Frans Bauer (2–4); Gerard Joling (solo, 3–4) | Martijn Krabbé; Wendy van Dijk (1); Lieke van Lexmond (2–4) |
| Nigeria | The Voice Nigeria | Africa Magic | Season 1, 2016: A'rese; Season 2, 2017: Idyl; Season 3, 2021: Esther Benyeogo; Season 4, 2022–23: Pere Jason | Waje (1–4); 2Baba (1); Patoranking (1–2); Timi Dakolo (1–2); Yemi Alade (2–3); Falz (3); Darey (3); Praiz (4); Niyola (4); Naeto C (4) | IK Osakioduwa (1–2); Stephanie Coker (backstage, 1–2); Toke Makinwa (3); Nancy Isime (3); Kate Henshaw (4); Zainab Balogun (4) |
| North Macedonia | The Voice of Macedonia | MRT 1 | Season 1, 2027: New series | TBA | TBA |
| North Macedonia | The Voice Kids | MRT 1 | Season 1, 2027: New series | TBA | TBA |
| Norway | The Voice – Norges beste stemme The Voice – Norway's Best Voice | TV2; Website | Season 1, 2012: Martin Halla; Season 2, 2013: Knut Marius; Season 3, 2015: Yvonne Nordvik Sivertsen; Season 4, 2017: Thomas Løseth; Season 5, 2019: Maria Engås Halsne; Season 6, 2021: Erlend Gunstveit; Season 7, 2022: Jørgen Dahl Moe; Season 8, 2023: Kira Dalan-Eriksen; Season 9, 2024: Inger Lise Hope; Season 10, 2025: Andrea Holm; Season 11, 2026: Eskil Fossum Vik; Season 12, 2027: Upcoming season | Current; Espen Lind (2–3, 6–); Jarle Bernhoft (8–9, 11–); Ingebjørg Bratland (11–); Marion Raven (11–); Former; Magne Furuholmen (1); Tommy Tee (2); Lene Nystrøm (2); Sondre Lerche (1–3); Hanne Sørvaag (1, 3); Lene Marlin (4–5); Morten Harket (4–5); Martin Danielle (4–5); Matoma (6–7); Ina Wroldsen (6–9); Yosef Wolde-Mariam (1, 3–10); Gabrielle Leithaug (10); Eva Weel Skram (10) | Current; Siri Avlesen (7–); Maria Bodøgaard (backstage); Former; Øyvind Mund (1–6) |
| Pakistan | The Voice Pakistan | TBA | Season 1, 2027: New series | TBA | TBA |
| Peru | La Voz Peru; The Voice Peru | Latina Televisión | Season 1, 2013: Daniel Lazo; Season 2, 2014: Ruby Palomino; Season 3, 2015: Yamilet de la Jara; Season 4, 2021: Marcela Navarro; Season 5, 2022: Lita Pezo; Season 6, 2023: Luis Manuel | Jerry Rivera (1–2); El Puma (1–2); Kalimba (1–2); Gian Marco Zignago (3); Álex Lora (3); Luis Enrique (3); Guillermo Dávila (4); Mike Bahía (4); Daniela Darcourt (4–5); Noel Schajris (5); Christian Yaipén (5); Eva Ayllón (1–6); Mauricio Mesones (6); Maricarmen Marin (6); Raúl Romero (6) | Diego Ubierna (1–2); Cristian Rivero (1–5); Jesús Alzamora (3, 6); María Paz Gonzales-Vigil (6); Karen Schwarz (Live shows, 4–5) |
| Peru | La Voz Kids; The Voice Kids | Latina Televisión | Season 1, 2014: Amy Gutiérrez; Season 2, 2015: Sofía Hernández; Season 3, 2016: Nicolás Parra; Season 4, 2021: Gianfranco Bustios; Season 5, 2022: Gianmarco Morales | Kalimba (1–2); Anna Carina (1–3); Luis Enrique (3); Daniela Darcourt (4); Joey Montana (4); Christian Yaipén (4); Eva Ayllón (1–5); Victor Muñoz (5); Maricarmen Marin (5); Ezio Oliva (5)^{7} | Cristian Rivero (1–5); Almendra Gomelsky (1); Gigi Mitre (2); Katia Condos (3); Gianella Neyra (4); Karen Schwarz (5) |
| Peru | La Voz Senior; The Voice Senior | Latina Televisión | Season 1, 2021: Mito Plaza; Season 2, 2022: Javier Carranza | Pimpinela (duo, 1); Tony Succar (1); Eva Ayllón (1–2); Daniela Darcourt (1–2); René Farrait (2); Raúl Romero (2) | Cristian Rivero; Karen Schwarz (Live shows) |
| Peru | La Voz Generaciones; The Voice Generations | Latina Televisión | Season 1, 2022–23: Los Dávila | Eva Ayllón; Tony Succar & Mimy Succar (duo); Christian Yaipén | Cristian Rivero; Karen Schwarz |
| Philippines | The Voice of the Philippines | Current; GMA Network (3–); Former; ABS-CBN (1–2) | Season 1, 2013: Mitoy Yonting; Season 2, 2014–15: Jason Dy | apl.de.ap (1–2); Lea Salonga (1–2); Sarah Geronimo (1–2); Bamboo Mañalac (1–2) | Toni Gonzaga (1–2); Luis Manzano (2); Robi Domingo (backstage, 1–2); Alex Gonzaga (backstage, 1–2) |
| Philippines | The Voice Kids | Current; GMA Network (6–); Former; ABS-CBN (1–4); Kapamilya Channel (5); A2Z (5); TV5 (5) | Season 1, 2014: Lyca Gairanod; Season 2, 2015: Elha Nympha; Season 3, 2016: Joshua Oliveros; Season 4, 2019: Vanjoss Bayaban; Season 5, 2023: Shane Bernabe; Season 6, 2024: Nevin Garceniego; Season 7, 2025: Sofia Mallares; Season 8, 2026: Current season; Season 9, 2027: Upcoming season | Current; Julie Anne San Jose (6–); Yeng Constantino (8–); Gloc-9 (8–); Former; Sharon Cuneta (3); Lea Salonga (1–4); Sarah Geronimo (1–2, 4); Bamboo Mañalac (1–5); KZ Tandingan (5); Martin Nievera (5); Stell (6); Pablo (6); Billy Crawford (6–7); Zack Tabudlo (7); Paolo and Miguel Benjamin Guico (duo, 7) | Current; Dingdong Dantes (6–); Gabbi Garcia (backstage, 8–); Former; Luis Manzano (1–3); Toni Gonzaga (4); Alex Gonzaga (backstage, 1); Yeng Constantino (backstage, 2); Kim Chiu (backstage, 3); KaladKaren (online, 4); Robi Domingo (backstage, 2–4; main, 5); Bianca Gonzalez (until semi-finals, backstage, 5); Jolina Magdangal (finals, backstage, 5); Jeremy Glinoga (online, 4–5); Elha Nympha (online, 5); Josh Ford (finals, online, 7); Cheska Fausto (finals, online, 7) |
| Philippines | The Voice Teens | ABS-CBN (1–2); Kapamilya Channel (2–3) | Season 1, 2017: Jona Marie Soquite; Season 2, 2020: Team Winners per Coach^{28}; Season 3, 2024: Jillian Pamat | Sharon Cuneta (1); Lea Salonga (1–2); Sarah Geronimo (1–2); apl.de.ap (2); Bamboo Mañalac (1–3); KZ Tandingan (3); Martin Nievera (3) | Toni Gonzaga (1); Luis Manzano (1–2); Alex Gonzaga (2); Robi Domingo (online, 1; main, 3); Bianca Gonzalez (3); KaladKaren (online, 2); Jeremy Glinoga (online, 2–3); Lorraine Galvez (online, 3); Kendra Aguirre (online, 3); Isang Manlapaz (online, 3) |
| Philippines | The Voice Generations | GMA Network | Season 1, 2023: VOCALMYX | Chito Miranda; Billy Crawford; Julie Anne San Jose; Stell | Dingdong Dantes; Betong Sumaya (online); Jennie Gabriel (online); Crystal Paras (online); Timmy Albert (online); Matt Lozano (online); Shuvee Etrata (online) |
| Poland | The Voice of Poland | TVP2; Website | Season 1, 2011: Damian Ukeje; Season 2, Spring 2013: Natalia Sikora; Season 3, Fall 2013: Mateusz Ziółko; Season 4, Spring 2014: Juan Carlos Cano; Season 5, Fall 2014: Aleksandra Nizio; Season 6, 2015: Krzysztof Iwaneczko; Season 7, 2016: Mateusz Grędziński; Season 8, 2017: Marta Gałuszewska; Season 9, 2018: Marcin Sójka; Season 10, 2019: Alicja Szemplińska; Season 11, 2020: Krystian Ochman; Season 12, 2021: Marta Burdynowicz; Season 13, 2022: Dominik Dudek; Season 14, 2023: Jan Górka; Season 15, 2024: Anna Iwanek; Season 16, 2025: Jan Piwowarczyk; Season 17, 2026: Current season | Current; Tomson & Baron (duo, 2–8, 10–); Michał Szpak (8–11, 15–); Kuba Badach (15–); Edyta Bartosiewicz (17–); Ania Karwan (comeback stage, 16–)^{19}; Former; Anna Dąbrowska (1); Kayah (1); Nergal (1); Natalia Kukulska (7); Andrzej Piaseczny (1, 6–8); Maria Sadowska (3–4, 6–8); Piotr Cugowski (9); Grzegorz Hyży (9); Patrycja Markowska (2, 9); Kamil Bednarek (10); Edyta Górniak (3, 5–6, 11); Urszula Dudziak (11); Sylwia Grzeszczak (12); Justyna Steczkowska (2, 4–5, 12–14); Marek Piekarczyk (2–5, 12–14); Lanberry (13–15); Margaret (10, 16) | Current; Paulina Chylewska (15–); Maciej Musiał (backstage, 2–9; main, 10–11, 15–); Jan Dąbrowski (backstage, 15, 17–); Sylwia Dąbrowska (backstage, 17–); Former; Hubert Urbański (1); Marika (2–4); Magdalena Mielcarz (1, 5); Halina Mlynkova (6); Barbara Kurdej-Szatan (7–9); Mateusz Szymkowiak (backstage, 1); Iga Krefft (backstage, 2); Marta Siurnik (backstage, 3–5); ReZigiusz (backstage, 6); Łukasz Jakubiak (backstage, 7); Krzysztof Jankowski (backstage, 9); Marcelina Zawadzka (backstage, 8, 10); Adam Zdrójkowski (backstage, 10–11); Małgorzata Tomaszewska–Słomina (backstage, 11; main, 12–13); Michał Szczygieł (backstage, 12); Tomasz Kammel (2–14); Aleksander Sikora (backstage, 12–14); Hi Hania (backstage, 16) |
| Poland | The Voice Kids | TVP2; Website | Season 1, 2018: Roksana Węgiel; Season 2, 2019: Anna Dąbrowska; Season 3, 2020: Marcin Maciejczak; Season 4, 2021: Sara James; Season 5, 2022: Mateusz Krzykała; Season 6, 2023: Martyna Gąsak; Season 7, 2024: Michell Siwak; Season 8, 2025: Zosia Wójcik; Season 9, 2026: Wiktor Sas; Season 10, 2027: Upcoming season | Current; Cleo (2–); Tribbs (9–); Tomson & Baron (duo, 1–8, 10–); Sara James (10–)^{7}; Former; Edyta Górniak (1); Dawid Kwiatkowski (1–6); Natasza Urbańska (7–8); Blanka (9) | Current; Paulina Chylewska (8–); Michalina Sosna (8–); Jan Dąbrowski (backstage, 2–3, 8–); Antoni Scardina (backstage, 2–); Former; Barbara Kurdej-Szatan (1–2); Adam Zdrójkowski (backstage, 1); Leon Paszek (backstage, 1); Witold Sosulski (backstage, 1); Tomasz Kammel (1–7); Ida Nowakowska (3–7); Oliwier Szot (backstage, 4–7) |
| Poland | The Voice Senior | TVP2; Website | Season 1, 2019: Jola, Krystyna, & Ela Szydłowskie; Season 2, 2021: Barbara Parzeczewska; Season 3, 2022: Krzysztof Prusik; Season 4, 2023: Zbigniew Zaranek; Season 5, 2024: Regina Bavcevic; Season 6, 2025: Wojciech Bardowski; Season 7, 2026: Violetta Kapcewicz; Season 8, 2027: Upcoming season | Current; Andrzej Piaseczny (1–2, 6–); Robert Janowski (6–); Alicja Majewska (1–3, 7–); Majka Jeżowska (7–); Former; Marek Piekarczyk (1); Urszula Dudziak (1); Izabela Trojanowska (2); Witold Paszt^{†} (2–3); Piotr Cugowski (3–4); Maryla Rodowicz (3–5); Alicja Węgorzewska (4–5); Tomasz Szczepanik (4–5); Halina Frąckowiak (5); Małgorzata Ostrowska (6); Tatiana Okupnik (6) | Current; Marta Manowska (1–3, 5–); Łukasz Nowicki (7–); Former; Marek Grąbczewski (backstage); Tomasz Kammel (1); Małgorzata Tomaszewska–Słomina (4); Nina Busk^{†} (backstage, 1); Rafał Brzozowski (2–5); Robert Stockinger (6–) |
| Portugal | Current; The Voice Portugal (2–); Former; A Voz de Portugal (1); The Voice of Portugal | RTP1 | Season 1, 2011–12: Denis Filipe; Season 2, 2014: Rui Drumond; Season 3, 2015–16: Deolinda Kinzimba; Season 4, 2016: Fernando Daniel; Season 5, 2017: Tomás Adrião; Season 6, 2018: Marvi; Season 7, 2019–20: Rita Sanches; Season 8, 2020–21: Luís Trigacheiro; Season 9, 2021–22: Rodrigo Lourenço; Season 10, 2022–23: Gustavo Reinas; Season 11, 2023–24: José Bacelar; Season 12, 2024–25: Rafael Ribeiro; Season 13, 2025–26: Rafael Alves; Season 14, 2026–27: Current season; Season 15, 2027–28: Upcoming season | Current; Fernando Daniel (11–14); Sónia Tavares (11–); David Carreira & Mickael Carreira (duo, 14–); Cláudia Pascoal (14–); Luís Trigacheiro (second chance, 14–); Former; Anjos (duo, 1); Mia Rose (1); Paulo Gonzo (1); Rui Reininho (1–2); Anselmo Ralph (2–6); Mickael Carreira (solo, 2–6); Aurea (3–9); Marisa Liz (2–10); Diogo Piçarra (7–10); Carolina Deslandes (10); Dino d'Santiago (10); António Zambujo (7–9, 11); Nininho Vaz Maia (12); Calema (13); Sara Correia (11–13) | Current; Catarina Furtado; Maria Petronilho (backstage, 12–); Former; Vasco Palmeirim (2–10); Diogo Beja (backstage, 1); Laura Figueiredo (backstage, 2); Mariana Monteiro (backstage, 2); Pedro Fernandes (backstage, 2); Jani Gabriel (backstage, 3–5); Mafalda de Castro (backstage, 6–7); Fábio Lopes (backstage, 8–9); Catarina Maia (backstage, 10–11) |
| Portugal | The Voice Kids | RTP1 | Season 1, 2014: Diogo Garcia; Season 2, 2021: Simão Oliveira; Season 3, 2022: Maria Gil; Season 4, 2023: Júlia Machado; Season 5, 2024: Victoria Nicole; Season 6, 2025: Inês Gonçalves; Season 7, 2026: Salvador Rio | Current; Cuca Roseta (5–); Diogo Piçarra (6–); Miguel Cristovinho (6–); Nena (6–)^{7}; Former; Raquel Tavares (1); Daniela Mercury (1); Anselmo Ralph (1); Marisa Liz (2); Carolina Deslandes (2–3); Fernando Daniel (2–4); Aurea (4); Carlão (2–5); Bárbara Tinoco (3–5); Nininho Vaz Maia (5) | Current; Catarina Furtado (2–); Maria Petronilho (backstage, 6–); Former; Vasco Palmeirim (1); Mariana Monteiro (1); Rui Maria Pêgo (backstage, 1); Bárbara Lourenço (backstage: Blind auditions and Battles, 2); Fábio Lopes (backstage: Live shows, 2; full season, 3); Catarina Maia (backstage, 4–5) |
| Portugal | The Voice Gerações; The Voice Generations | RTP1 | Season 1, 2022: Rodrigo d'Orey & Teresa de Castro; Season 2, 2023: Todagente; Season 3, 2025: D'Anto; Season 4, 2026: Os En'Canta Modas | Current; Mickael Carreira; Anselmo Ralph; Marisa Liz (3–); Gisela João (3–); Former; Bárbara Bandeira (1); Simone de Oliveira (1–2); Sara Correia (2) | Current; Catarina Furtado; Maria Petronilho (backstage, 3–); Former; Vasco Palmeirim (1–2); Catarina Maia (backstage, 2) |
| Romania; Moldova^{10} | Vocea României; The Voice of Romania | Pro TV; Pro TV Chișinău; Website | Season 1, 2011: Ștefan Stan; Season 2, 2012: Julie Mayaya; Season 3, 2013: Mihai Chițu; Season 4, 2014: Tiberiu Albu; Season 5, 2015: Cristina Bălan; Season 6, 2016: Teodora Buciu; Season 7, 2017: Ana Munteanu; Season 8, 2018: Bogdan Ioan; Season 9, 2019: Dragoș Moldovan; Season 10, 2022: Iulian Nunucă; Season 11, 2023: Alexandra Căpitănescu; Season 12, 2024: Aura Șova; Season 13, 2025: Alessia Pop; Season 14, 2026: Current season | Current; Tudor Chirilă (4–); Smiley (solo, 1–9, 11–); Irina Rimes (8–14); Theo Rose & Horia Brenciu (duo, 11–); Former; Marius Moga (1–6); Loredana Groza (1–7); Adrian Despot (7); Andra (8); Horia Brenciu (solo, 1–3, 9); Denis Roabeș (10); Smiley & Theo Rose (duo, 10) | Current; Pavel Bartoș; Adela Popescu (backstage, 12, semifinale, 13–); Former; Roxana Ionescu (1); Nicoleta Luciu (2–3); Vlad Roșca (backstage, 1–3); Oana Tache (backstage, 4–5); Lili Sandu (backstage, 6–7); Laura Giurcanu (backstage, 8); Irina Fodor (backstage, 8–9); Iulia Pârlea (backstage, 10); Alina Ceușan (backstage, 11); Gina Pistol (backstage, 12, 1st live); Mihai Rait Dragomir (backstage, 12, finale) |
| Romania; Moldova^{10} | Vocea României Junior; The Voice of Romania Junior | Pro TV; Pro TV Chișinău; Website | Season 1, 2017: Maia Mălăncuș; Season 2, 2018: Maya Ciosa | Andra; Marius Moga; Inna | Mihai Bobonete; Robert Tudor |
| Russia | Голос^{14} The Voice | Channel One; Website | Season 1, 2012: Dina Garipova; Season 2, 2013: Sergey Volchkov; Season 3, 2014: Alexandra Vorobyeva; Season 4, 2015: Hieromonk Fotiy; Season 5, 2016: Daria Antonyuk; Season 6, 2017: Selim Alakhyarov; Season 7, 2018–19: Petr Zakharov; Season 8, 2019–20: Asker Berbekov; Season 9, 2020: Yana Gabbasova; Season 10, 2021: Alexander Volkodav; Season 11, 2023: Victoria Solomakhina; Season 12, 2024: Bogdan Shuvalov; Season 13, 2025: David Sanikidze; Season 14, 2026: Elmira Karakhanova | Grigory Leps (4–5); Ani Lorak (7); Konstantin Meladze (7–8); Sergey Shnurov (7–9); Valeriy Syutkin (8–9); Dima Bilan (1–3, 5–6, 10); Leonid Agutin (1–3, 5–6, 10); Alexander Gradsky^{†} (1–4, 6, 10); Zivert (12); Polina Gagarina (4–5, 8–9, 11–13); Anton Belyaev (11–13); Basta (4, 7, 9, 11, 13); Hibla Gerzmava (13); Vladimir Presnyakov (11–12, 14); Pelageya (1–3, 6, 10, 14); Ildar Abdrazakov (14); Anna Asti (14) | Dmitry Nagiev (1–10); Yana Churikova (11–14) |
| Russia | Голос. Дети^{14} The Voice Kids | Channel One; Website | Season 1, 2014: Alisa Kozhikina; Season 2, 2015: Sabina Mustaeva; Season 3, 2016: Danil Pluzhnikov; Season 4, 2017: Elizaveta Kachurak; Season 5, 2018: Rutger Garekht; Season 6, 2019: No winner^{22}; Season 7, 2020: Olesya Kazachenko; Season 8, 2021: Vladislav Tyukin; Season 9, 2022: Adelia Zagrebina; Season 10, 2022–23: Anna Dorovskaya; Season 11, 2024: Vasily Igolkin; Season 12, 2025: Maria Nikulina; Season 13, 2026: Current season | Current; Polina Gagarina (7, 9, 13–); Aida Garifullina & Alexey Vorobyov (duo, 13–); Vanya Dmitrienko (13–); Former; Maxim Fadeev (1–2); Leonid Agutin (3); Nyusha (4); Pelageya (1–3, 5–6); Valery Meladze (4–7); LOBODA (6, 8); Basta (5, 7–10); Egor Kreed (8–10); MakSim (10); Yulianna Karaulova (11); JONY (11); Dima Bilan (1–4, 11–12); Vladimir Presnyakov & Natalia Podolskaya (duo, 12); Aida Garifullina (solo, 12) | Current; Yana Churikova (10–); Valya Karnaval (11–); Former; Dmitry Nagiev (1–9); Natalia Vodianova (1); Anastasia Chevazhevskaya (2); Valeria Lanskaya (3); Svetlana Zeinalova (4); Aglaya Shilovskaya (6); Agata Muceniece (5, 7–10) |
| Russia | Голос. 60+ The Voice 60+ | Channel One; Website | Season 1, 2018: Lidia Muzaleva; Season 2, 2019: Leonid Sergienko; Season 3, 2020: Dina Yudina; Season 4, 2021: Mikhail Serebryakov^{†}; Season 5, 2022: Raisa Dmitrenko | Leonid Agutin (1); Valery Meladze (1); Pelageya (1–2); Valeriya (2); Mikhail Boyarsky (2); Lev Leshchenko (1–3); Tamara Gverdtsiteli (3); Garik Sukachov (3); Stas Namin (4); Laima Vaikule (4); Valery Leontiev (4); Oleg Gazmanov (4); Elena Vaenga (3, 5); Valeriy Syutkin (5); Alexander Malinin (5); Igor Kornelyuk (5) | Dmitry Nagiev (1–4); Larisa Guzeeva (5) |
| Russia | Голос. Уже не дети The Voice No longer kids Original | Channel One; Website | Season 1, 2023: Veronika Syromlya | Dima Bilan; Pelageya; Polina Gagarina; Egor Kreed | Yana Churikova |
| Serbia | The Voice – Najlepši glas The Voice – The Most Beautiful Voice | Prva TV | Season 1, 2027: New series | TBA | TBA |
| South Africa | The Voice South Africa | M-Net^{9} Website | Season 1, 2016: Richard Stirton; Season 2, 2017: Craig Lucas; Season 3, 2019: Tasché Burger | Karen Zoid (1–2); Kahn Morbee (1–2); Bobby van Jaarsveld (1–2); Lira (1–3); Riana Nel (3); Francois Van Coke (3); Riky Rick^{†} (3) | Lungile Radu (1–2); Anele Mdoda (3); Stacey Norman (backstage, 1–2) |
| South Korea | The Voice of Korea | Mnet^{9} Website | Season 1, 2012: Son Seung-yeon; Season 2, 2013: Lee Ye-jun; Season 3, 2020: Kim Ji-hyun | Gil (1–2); Kangta (1–2); Baek Ji-young (1–2); Shin Seung-hun (1–2); Kim Jong-kook (3); BoA (3); Sung Si-kyung (3); Dynamic Duo (duo, 3) | Kim Jin-pyo (1–2); Jang Sung-kyu (3); Park Ji-yoon (backstage, 1–2) |
| South Korea | The Voice Kids | Mnet^{9} Website | Season 1, 2013: Kim Myung-ju | Yoon Sang (1); Seo In-young (1); Yang Yo-seob (1) | Jun Hyun-moo (1) |
| Spain; Andorra | La Voz^{13} The Voice | Current; Antena 3 (6–); Former; Telecinco (1–5); Website | Season 1, 2012: Rafa Blas; Season 2, 2013: David Barrull; Season 3, 2015: Antonio José; Season 4, 2016: Irene Caruncho; Season 5, 2017: Alba Gil; Season 6, 2019: Andrés Martín; Season 7, 2020: Kelly; Season 8, 2021: Inés Manzano; Season 9, 2022: Javier Crespo; Season 10, 2023: Elsa Tortonda; Season 11, 2024: Manuel Ayra; Season 12, 2025: Antía Pinal; Season 13, 2026: Current season | Current; Pablo López (5–7, 9–); Mika (12–); Melendi (1, 4, 13–); Lola Índigo (13–); Vanesa Martín (13–; battles); Former; David Bisbal (1–2); Rosario Flores (1–2); Manuel Carrasco (4–5); Juanes (5); Paulina Rubio (6); Alejandro Sanz (3–4, 7–8); Pablo Alborán (8); Laura Pausini (3, 7, 9); Miriam Rodríguez (comeback stage, 7–8, 10)^{19}; Luis Fonsi (6, 8–11); Antonio Orozco (2–3, 6–7, 9–11); Malú (1–5, 8, 10–12); Sebastián Yatra (12) | Current; Eva González (6–); Former; Jesús Vázquez (1–5); Tania Llasera (backstage, 1–5); Juanra Bonet (backstage, 6) |
| Spain; Andorra | La Voz Kids; The Voice Kids | Current; Antena 3 (5–); Former; Telecinco (1–4); Website | Season 1, 2014: María Parrado; Season 2, 2015: José María Ruiz; Season 3, 2017: Rocío Aguilar; Season 4, 2018: Melani García Gaspar; Season 5, 2019: Irene Gil; Season 6, 2021: Levi Díaz; Season 7, 2022: Pol Calvo; Season 8, 2023: Rubén Franco; Season 9, 2024: Alira Moya; Season 10, 2025: Lucas Paulano; Season 11, 2026: Eduardo Sánchez; Season 12, 2027: Upcoming season | Current; Edurne (10–); Ana Mena (11–); Antonio Orozco (3–4, 11–); Manuel Turizo (10, 12–)^{7}; Former; Malú (1); Manuel Carrasco (2); Vanesa Martín (5–6); Pablo López (7); Aitana (7–8); Sebastián Yatra (7–8); Rosario Flores (1–6, 8–9); Melendi (4–6, 9); David Bisbal^{15} (1–3, 5–10); Lola Indigo (9–10); Luis Fonsi (11) | Current; Eva González (5–); Juanra Bonet (backstage, 5–); Former; Jesús Vázquez (1–4); Tania Llasera (backstage, 1–4) |
| Spain; Andorra | La Voz Senior; The Voice Senior | Antena 3 | Season 1, 2019: Helena Bianco^{†}; Season 2, 2020: Naida Abanovich; Season 3, 2022: Gwen Perry | Antonio Orozco (1–3); David Bisbal (1); Paulina Rubio (1); Pablo López (1); Rosana (2); Pastora Soler (2); David Bustamante (2–3); Niña Pastori (3); José Mercé (3) | Eva González |
| Spain; Andorra | La Voz All Stars; The Voice All Stars | Antena 3 | Season 1, 2023: Toyemi | Luis Fonsi; Pablo López; Antonio Orozco; Malú | Eva González |
| Sri Lanka | The Voice Teens^{25} | Sirasa TV | Season 1, 2020: Hashen Dulanjana; Season 2, 2022: Pranirsha Thiyagaraja; Season 3, 2026: Janiru Kavinda | Current; Sanka Dineth (2–); Yohani (3–); Yasas Medagedara (3–); Raini Charuka Goonatillake (1–2) (battles onwards, 3–); Former; Ashanthi De Alwis (1); Dumal Warnakulasuriya (1); Sanuka Wickramasinghe (1); Lahiru Perera (2); Abhisheka Wimalaweera (2) (Blind auditions, 3) | Current; Julia Sonali; Former; Stephanie Siriwardhana (1-2) |
| Sri Lanka | The Voice Sri Lanka^{31} | Sirasa TV | Season 1, 2020–21: Harith Wijeratne; Season 2, 2022–23: Rameesh Sashinka; Season 3, 2024–25: Imesh Sandeepa; Season 4, 2026–27: Upcoming season | Current; Supun Perera (comeback stage, 2,) (3–)^{19}; Raini Charuka Goonatillake (3–); Hirushi (3–); Mihindu Ariyaratne (3–); Former; Kasun Kalhara (1–2); Sashika Nisansala (1–2); Umaria Sinhawansa (1–2); Bathiya and Santhush (duo, 1–2) | Current; Sumiran Dhananjaya Gunasekara; Former; Dinithi Walgamage (Blind auditions, 1); Kingsley Rathnayake (Battles, 1) |
| Sri Lanka | The Voice Kids | Sirasa TV | Season 1, 2023–24: Aslam Roshan | Pradeep Rangana; Uresha Ravihari; Harshana Dissanayake; Nadini Premadasa | Nathasha Perera |
| Sweden | The Voice Sverige; The Voice Sweden | TV4 | Season 1, 2012: Ulf Nilsson | Petter (1); Ola Salo (1); Magnus Uggla (1); Carola Häggkvist (1) | Carina Berg (1); Simona Abraham (backstage, 1) |
| Switzerland; Liechtenstein | The Voice of Switzerland | SRF 1 (1–2); 3+ (3); Website | Season 1, 2013: Nicole Bernegger; Season 2, 2014: Tiziana Gulino; Season 3, 2020: Remo Forrer | Stress (1–2); Marc Sway (1–2); Stefanie Heinzmann (1–2); Philipp Fankhauser (1–2); DJ Antoine (3); Anna Rossinelli (3); Noah Veraguth (3); Büetzer Buebe (duo, 3) | Sven Epiney (1–2); Christa Rigozzi (3); Max Loong (3); Viola Tami (backstage, 1; main, 2); Tanya König (backstage, 2) |
| Thailand | The Voice Thailand | Current; True4U (10–); Former; Channel 3 (1–6); PPTV36 (7–8); One31 (9); Website | Season 1, 2012: Thanon Chamroen; Season 2, 2013: Rangsan Panyaruen; Season 3, 2014: Somsak Rinnairak; Season 4, 2015: Thittinan Aonpan; Season 5, 2016–17: Siphum Bencharat; Season 6, 2017–18: Wachirawit Chinkoet; Season 7, 2018–19: Pongsatorn Kambang; Season 8, 2019: Eakkamon Bunphothong; Season 9, 2024: Theeraphong Deaw; Season 10, 2026: Current season | Current; Kong Saharat; Jennifer Kim (1–4, 7–); Oat Pramote (9–); Jaii Taitosmith (9–); Former; Stamp Apiwat (1–3); Singto Numchok (4–6); Da Endorphine (5–6); Joey Boy (1–8); Pop Pongkul (7–8); Bowkylion (comeback stage 9) | Current; Songsit Roongnophakunsri; Former; Rinlanee Sripen (backstage, 2–6) |
| Thailand | The Voice Kids | Channel 3 (1–5); 3 HD (2–5); PPTV36 (6–7); Website | Season 1, 2013: Kuljira Tongkham; Season 2, 2014: Pornsawun Yanvaro; Season 3, 2015: Natharika Phetfu; Season 4, 2016: Jedsada Sukharom; Season 5, 2017: Siripong Srisukha; Season 6, 2019: Mac-Sirichai Chaiyakul; Season 7, 2020: Gracy Phattanan | Two Popetorn (1); Zani Nipaporn (1–3); Parn Thanaporn (1–3); Sumet & The Punk (duo, 2–3); Tongneng Rudklao (4–5); Lula (4–6); Tik Shiro (4–7); Joke So Cool (6–7); Mam Patcharida (6–7); Wan Thanakrit (7)^{7} | Songsit Roongnophakunsri; Rinlanee Sripen (1–5); Sawitree Sutthichanon (6–7) |
| Thailand | The Voice Senior | PPTV36; Website | Season 1, 2019: Sanae Damkham; Season 2, 2020: Ah Fort | Parn Thanaporn (1); Stamp Apiwat; Tam Charas; Kong Saharat; Took Viyada (2) | Songsit Roongnophakunsri |
| Thailand | The Voice All Stars | One31 (1) | Season 1, 2022: Pure Ekkaphan Wannasut | Joey Boy; Kong Saharat; Jennifer Kim; Pop Pongkul | Songsit Roongnophakunsri |
| Thailand | The Voice Pride; Original | Channel 7 HD | Season 1, 2025: Nerd Natnicha | Timethai; Saowalak Leelabut; Chalatit Tantiwut | Songsit Roongnophakunsri |
| Thailand | The Voice Teens | True4U | Season 1, 2027: New series | Jeff Satur; Bowkylion; The Toys; Ink | Paris Intarakomalyasut |
| Thailand | The Voice Celebrity | True4U | Season 1, 2026: New series | Kong Saharat; Jennifer Kim; Oat Pramote; Jaii Taitosmith | Songsit Roongnophakunsri |
| Turkey | O Ses Türkiye; The Voice Turkey | Show TV (1); Star TV (2–3); TV8 (4–); Website | Season 1, 2011–12: Oğuz Berkay Fidan; Season 2, 2012–13: Mustafa Bozkurt; Season 3, 2013–14^{27}: Hasan Doğru; Season 4, 2014–15: Elnur Hüseynov; Season 5, 2015–16: Emre Sertkaya; Season 6, 2016–17: Dodan Özer; Season 7, 2017–18: Lütfiye Özipek; Season 8, 2018–19: Ferat Üngür; Season 9, 2019–20: Alkan Dalgakıran; Season 10, 2021–22: Hasan Koçak; Season 11, 2025: Mert Özer | Mustafa Sandal (1–2); Hülya Avşar (1–2); Mazhar Alanson & Özkan Uğur ^{†} (duo, 4); Gökhan & Hakan Özoğuz (duo^{6}, 5–6); Sibel Can (6); Yıldız Tilbe (7); Beyazıt Öztürk (8–11); Seda Sayan (8–9); Oğuzhan Koç (10); Murat Boz (1–3, 5–10); Ebru Gündeş (3–5, 10); Hadise (1–9, 11); Gökhan Özoğuz (solo^{6}, 3–4, 7, 11); Melike Şahin (11) | Acun Ilıcalı (1–10); Alp Kırşan (1–3); Zeynep Dörtkardeşler (4–9); Saadet Özsırkıntı (11) |
| Turkey | O Ses Çocuklar^{7} The Voice Kids | Star TV (1); TV8 (2–3) | Season 1, 2014: Şahin Kendirci; Season 2, 2015: Bade Karakoç; Season 3, 2016: Derin Yeğin | Hadise (1–3); Murat Boz (1–2); Mustafa Ceceli (1–2); Oğuzhan Koç (2–3); Burak Kut (3) | Jess Molho (1–3); Sinem Yalçinkaya (backstage, 1); Zeynep Dörtkardeşler (backstage, 2–3) |
| Turkey | O Ses Türkiye Rap; The Voice Turkey Rap; Original | Exxen | Season 1, 2021: Ekin Koşar; Season 2, 2023: Eray Ünal | Mero (solo, 1); Murda (solo, 1); Eypio; Hadise; Mero & Murda (duo, 2); Sefo (2) | Heja (1); Saadet Özsırkıntı (2) |
| Ukraine | Голос країни^{14} The Voice of Ukraine | 1+1 (1 – 12е5); TET (12е6 – 12e12); 1+1 Ukraine (13–); Belsat (13); Website | Season 1, 2011: Ivan Hanzera; Season 2, 2012: Pavlo Tabakov; Season 3, 2013: Anna Khodorovsʹka; Season 4, 2014: Ihor Hrokhotsʹkyy; Season 5, 2015: Anton Kopityn; Season 6, 2016: Vitalina Musyenko; Season 7, 2017: Oleksandr Klymenko; Season 8, 2018: Olena Lutsenko; Season 9, 2019: Oksana Mukha; Season 10, 2020: Roman Sasanchyn^{26}; Season 11, 2021: Serhiy Lazanovskyy; Season 12, 2022: Mariya Kvitka; Season 13, 2023: Mykhailo Panchyshyn (PTASHKIN); Season 14, 2026–27: Current season; Season 15, 2027: Upcoming season | Current; Artem Pyvovarov (13–); Tina Karol (3, 5–11, 14–); Monatik (9–11, 14–); Natalia Mohylevska (14–); Former; Ruslana (1); Stas Piekha (1); Diana Arbenina (1–2); Valeriya (2); Oleh Skrypka (2–3); Ani Lorak (4); Sergey Lazarev (4); Tamara Gverdtsiteli (4); Oleksandr Ponomariov (1–3, 5); Ivan Dorn (6); Jamala (7–8); Sergiy Babkin (7–8); Potap & NK (duo, 10); Dan Balan (9–10); Olegg Vynnyk (11); Potap (solo, 5–9, 12); Svyatoslav Vakarchuk (3–6, 12); Olya Polyakova (12); Nadya Dorofeeva (11–13); Julia Sanina (13); Ivan Klymenko (13); Comeback Stage; Oleksandra Zaritska & Andriy Matsola (comeback stage, 12)^{19} | Current; Yuriy Horbunov (5–); Kateryna Osadcha (1–3, 6–); Natalie Solonik (backstage 14–); Former; Andriy Domansʹkyy (1–3); Olʹha Freymut (4–5); Mykyta Dobrynin (backstage, 1); Anatoliy Anatolich (backstage, 1–5); Artem Gagarin (backstage, 8); Roma Geniy (backstage, 10); Slava Demin (backstage, 11); Serhiy Lazanovskyy (backstage, 12) |
| Ukraine | Голос. Діти^{14} The Voice Kids | 1+1 | Season 1, 2012–13: Anna Tkach; Season 2, 2015: Roman Sasanchyn^{26}; Season 3, 2016: Elina Ivaschenko; Season 4, 2017: Daneliya Tuleshova; Season 5, 2019: Oleksandr Zazarashvyli | Oleh Skrypka (1); LOBODA (1); Tina Karol (1–3); Potap (2–3); Monatik (3–4); Natalia Mohylevska (2, 4); Vremya i Steklo (duo, 4–5); Jamala (5); Dzidzio (5) | Andriy Domansʹkyy (1); Kateryna Osadcha (1–5); Yuriy Horbunov (2–5) |
| United Kingdom | The Voice UK | Current; ITV (6–)^{24} Website; Former; BBC One (1–5); Website | Season 1, 2012: Leanne Mitchell; Season 2, 2013: Andrea Begley; Season 3, 2014: Jermain Jackman; Season 4, 2015: Stevie McCrorie; Season 5, 2016: Kevin Simm; Season 6, 2017: Mo Adeniran; Season 7, 2018: Ruti Olajugbagbe; Season 8, 2019: Molly Hocking; Season 9, 2020: Blessing Chitapa; Season 10, 2021: Craig Eddie; Season 11, 2022: Anthonia Edwards; Season 12, 2023: Jen & Liv; Season 13, 2024: AVA; Season 14, 2026: Cate McHugh; Season 15, 2027: Upcoming season | Current; will.i.am; Kelly Rowland (14–); Cheryl (15–); Aitch (15–); Former; Danny O'Donoghue (1–2); Jessie J (1–2); Kylie Minogue (3); Ricky Wilson (3–5); Rita Ora (4); Boy George (5); Paloma Faith (5); Gavin Rossdale (6); Jennifer Hudson (6–8); Meghan Trainor (9); Olly Murs (7–12); Anne-Marie (10–12); LeAnn Rimes (13); Sir Tom Jones (1–4, 6–14); Tom Fletcher & Danny Jones (duo, 13–14) | Current; Alesha Dixon (15–); Stacey Solomon (backstage, 15–); Former; Holly Willoughby (1–2); Emma Willis (3–14); Reggie Yates (backstage, 1–2); Marvin Humes (backstage, 3–5); Cel Spellman (backstage, 6); Jamie Miller (backstage, 7); Vick Hope (backstage, 7); AJ Odudu (backstage, 8–10) |
| United Kingdom | The Voice Kids | ITV^{24} Website | Season 1, 2017: Jess Folley; Season 2, 2018: Daniel Davies; Season 3, 2019: Sam Wilkinson; Season 4, 2020: Justine Afante; Season 5, 2021: Torrin Cuthill; Season 6, 2022: Israella Chris; Season 7, 2023: Shanice & Andrea Nyandoro | will.i.am (1–7); Pixie Lott (1–7); Danny Jones (1–7); Jessie J (3); Paloma Faith (4); Melanie C (5); Ronan Keating (6–7) | Emma Willis (1–7); Cel Spellman (backstage, 1); Vick Hope (backstage, 2); AJ Odudu (backstage, 3–5) |
| United Kingdom; Wales | Y Llais(Welsh); The Voice | S4C | Season 1, 2025: Rose Datta; Season 2, 2026: Carrie Sauce; Season 3, 2027: Upcoming season | Bryn Terfel; Aleighcia Scott; Yws Gwynedd; Bronwen Lewis | Current; Steffan Powell (3–); Former; Sian Eleri (1–2) |
| United States and Caribbean countries | The Voice^{8}(English) | NBC; Website | Season 1, 2011: Javier Colon; Season 2, Spring 2012: Jermaine Paul; Season 3, Fall 2012: Cassadee Pope; Season 4, Spring 2013: Danielle Bradbery; Season 5, Fall 2013: Tessanne Chin; Season 6, Spring 2014: Josh Kaufman; Season 7, Fall 2014: Craig Wayne Boyd; Season 8, Spring 2015: Sawyer Fredericks; Season 9, Fall 2015: Jordan Smith; Season 10, Spring 2016: Alisan Porter; Season 11, Fall 2016: Sundance Head; Season 12, Spring 2017: Chris Blue; Season 13, Fall 2017: Chloe Kohanski; Season 14, Spring 2018: Brynn Cartelli; Season 15, Fall 2018: Chevel Shepherd; Season 16, Spring 2019: Maelyn Jarmon; Season 17, Fall 2019: Jake Hoot; Season 18, Spring 2020: Todd Tilghman; Season 19, Fall 2020: Carter Rubin; Season 20, Spring 2021: Cam Anthony; Season 21, Fall 2021: Girl Named Tom; Season 22, 2022: Bryce Leatherwood; Season 23, Spring 2023: Gina Miles; Season 24, Fall 2023: Huntley; Season 25, Spring 2024: Asher HaVon; Season 26, Fall 2024: Sofronio Vasquez; Season 27, Spring 2025: Adam David; Season 28, Fall 2025: Aiden Ross; Season 29, Spring 2026: Alexia Jayy; Season 30, Fall 2026: Current season; Season 31, Spring 2027: Upcoming season; Season 32, Fall 2027: Upcoming season | Current; Kelly Clarkson (14–21, 23, 29–30); Adam Levine (1–16, 27, 29–30); Riley Green (30–); Queen Latifah (30–); Former; CeeLo Green (1–3, 5); Shakira (4, 6); Usher (4, 6); Christina Aguilera (1–3, 5, 8, 10); Pharrell Williams (7–10); Miley Cyrus (11, 13); Alicia Keys (11–12, 14); Jennifer Hudson (13, 15); Nick Jonas (18, 20); Ariana Grande (21); Camila Cabello (22); Blake Shelton (1–23); Chance the Rapper (23, 25); Dan + Shay (duo, 25); Gwen Stefani (7, 9, 12, 17, 19, 22, 24, 26); Kelsea Ballerini (27); Michael Bublé (26–28); Niall Horan (23–24, 28); Reba McEntire (24–26, 28); Snoop Dogg (26, 28); John Legend (16–22, 24–25, 27, 29); Comeback Stage; Kelsea Ballerini (comeback stage, 15)^{19}; Bebe Rexha (comeback stage, 16)^{19}; Guest coaches; Kelsea Ballerini (battles, 20); Dan + Shay (duo, knockouts, 24); Jennifer Hudson (battles, 29); Upcoming; Joe Jonas (31–) | Current; Carson Daly (1–30); Former; Alison Haislip (backstage, 1); Christina Milian (backstage, 2–4); Upcoming; Keke Palmer (31) |
| United States and Caribbean countries | La Voz Kids (Spanish)^{25} The Voice Kids | Telemundo; Website | Season 1, 2013: Paola Guanche; Season 2, 2014: Amanda Mena; Season 3, 2015: Jonael Santiago; Season 4, 2016: Christopher Rivera | Paulina Rubio (1); Roberto Tapia (1–2); Prince Royce (1–2); Natalia Jiménez (2–4); Daddy Yankee (3–4); Pedro Fernández (3–4) | Jorge Bernal (1–4); Daisy Fuentes (1–3); Patricia Manterola (4) |
| United States and Caribbean countries | La Voz(Spanish); The Voice | Telemundo; Website | Season 1, 2019: Jeidimar Rijos; Season 2, 2020: Sammy Colon | Luis Fonsi (1–2); Alejandra Guzmán (1–2); Wisin (1–2); Carlos Vives (1–2); Mau y Ricky (duo, comeback stage, 2)^{19} | Jorge Bernal; Jacqueline Bracamontes; Jéssica Cediel (backstage, 1); Nastassja Bolívar (backstage, 2) |
| Uruguay | La Voz Uruguay; The Voice Uruguay | Canal 10 | Season 1, 2022: Oscar Collazo; Season 2, 2023: Federico Garat; Season 3, 2024: Marcos Agüero | Current; Agustín Casanova; Valeria Lynch; Luana Persíncula (3–); Former; Lucas Sugo (1–2); Rubén Rada^{†} (1–3) | Current; Noelia Etcheverry (3–); Former; Natalia Oreiro (1–2) |
| Uruguay | La Voz Kids; The Voice Kids | Canal 10 | Season 1, 2023: Sol Muñóz; Season 2, 2025: Valentina Sosa | Current; Agustín Casanova; Luana Persíncula (2–); Former; Valeria Lynch (1); Alex Ubago (1); Rubén Rada^{†} & Julieta Rada (duo, 1); Rubén Rada^{†} (solo, 2) | Noelia Etcheverry; Rafa Cotelo (backstage, 1); Daniel Ketchedjian (backstage, 2) |
| Uzbekistan | OVoz; The Voice of Uzbekistan | Zo'r TV | Season 1, 2024: Shohruxmirzo G’aniyev; Season 2, 2026: Diyora Jafarova | Current; Farrukh Zokirov; Shohruxxon (2–); Nasiba Abdullaeva (2–); Anvar Juraev (2–); Former; Ozodbek Nazarbekov (1); Sevara Nazarkhan (1); Tohir Sodiqov (1) | Mirshakar Fayzulloyev |
| Uzbekistan | OVoz Bolalar; The Voice Kids | Zo'r TV | Season 1, 2024: Qodirjon Valijonov; Season 2, 2027: Upcoming season | Current; TBA (2–); TBA (2–); TBA (2–); Former; Sevara Nazarkhan (1); DJ Piligrim (1); Botir Qodirov (1) | Jahongir Xo’jayev Khusnora Shadieva |
| Uzbekistan | OVoz 50+ The Voice 50+ | Zo'r TV | Season 1, 2025: O'lmas Olloberganov | Farrukh Zokirov; Kumush Razzoqova; DJ Piligrim | Mirshakar Fayzulloyev |
| Uzbekistan | OVoz O'smirlar; The Voice Teens | Zo'r TV | Season 1, 2025: Laylo | Shohruxxon; Anvar Juraev; Kumush Razzoqova | Mirshakar Fayzulloyev |
| Vietnam | Giọng hát Việt; The Voice of Vietnam | VTV3; VTV3 HD; Website | Season 1, 2012–13: Phạm Thị Hương Tràm; Season 2, 2013: Vũ Thảo My; Season 3, 2015: Đức Phúc; Season 4, 2017: Ali Hoàng Dương; Season 5, 2018: Trần Ngọc Ánh; Season 6, 2019: Hoàng Đức Thịnh | Trần Lập^{†} (1); Hồ Ngọc Hà (1); Mỹ Linh (2); Hồng Nhung (2); Quốc Trung (2); Đàm Vĩnh Hưng (1–3); Mỹ Tâm (3); Thu Minh (1, 4); Đông Nhi (4); Tóc Tiên (4–5); Noo Phước Thịnh (4–5); Thu Phương (3, 5); Lam Trường (5); Tuấn Hưng (3, 6); Tuấn Ngọc (6); Thanh Hà (6); Hồ Hoài Anh (special coach, 6) | Phan Anh (1–3); Nguyên Khang (4); Phí Linh (5–6); Phương Mai (backstage, 1); V.Music band (backstage, 1); Yumi Dương (backstage, 2); Phạm Mỹ Linh (backstage, 3); Tim (backstage, 4); Đặng Quỳnh Chi (backstage, 4); Ali Hoàng Dương (backstage-blind audition, 5–6) |
| Vietnam | Giọng hát Việt nhí The Voice Kids of Vietnam | VTV3; VTV3 HD; Website | Season 1, 2013: Nguyễn Quang Anh; Season 2, 2014: Nguyễn Thiện Nhân; Season 3, 2015: Trịnh Nguyễn Hồng Minh; Season 4, 2016: Trịnh Nhật Minh; Season 5, 2017: Dương Ngọc Ánh; Season 6, 2018: Hà Quỳnh Như; Season 7, 2019: Kiều Minh Tâm | Hiền Thục (1); Thanh Bùi (1); Cẩm Ly (2–3); Lam Trường (2); Dương Khắc Linh (solo, 3); Noo Phước Thịnh (4); Đông Nhi & Ông Cao Thắng (duo, 4); Vũ Cát Tường (solo, 4–5); Soobin Hoàng Sơn (solo, 5); Hương Tràm & Tiên Cookie (duo, 5); Hồ Hoài Anh & Lưu Hương Giang (duo, 1–3, 6); Khắc Hưng & Bảo Anh (duo, 6); Soobin Hoàng Sơn & Vũ Cát Tường (duo, 6); Ali Hoàng Dương & Lưu Thiên Hương (duo, 7); Dương Cầm & Hương Giang (duo, 7); Dương Khắc Linh & Phạm Quỳnh Anh (duo, 7) | Thanh Thảo (1); Trấn Thành (1); Thanh Bạch (2–3); Ngô Kiến Huy (4); Thành Trung (5); Phí Linh (6); Ali Hoàng Dương (6); Khả Ngân (7); Gil Lê (7); Thanh Duy (backstage, 2); Jennifer Phạm (backstage, 2); Hoàng Oanh (backstage, 3); Chi Pu (backstage, 4); Đặng Quỳnh Chi (backstage, 5) |

== Notes ==
1. ^1 The Voice of Albania is also broadcast in Kosovo. People from Kosovo are also allowed to join the show and vote.
2. ^2 The Chinese version allowed people who could speak Mandarin to join the competition, starting from season three. In 2016, there was a controversial issue between the producers of the Chinese version and Talpa on the copyrights of The Voice of China. Therefore, the show was rebranded as Sing! China, and is no longer part of The Voice franchise.
3. ^3 While La Voix is broadcast all across Canada, people from provinces outside Quebec (excluding those from the Ottawa/Gatineau area and English-speaking communities at New Brunswick) are not allowed to join the show.
4. ^4 The Voice of Greece is also broadcast in Cyprus. Cypriots are also allowed to join the show.
5. ^5 The Voice Angola is also broadcast in Mozambique. People from Mozambique are allowed to join the show.
6. ^6 In the Australian version of The Voice, Joel Madden served as a solo coach from season one to three. On seasons four and five, he was joined by his brother Benji Madden, and became as a duo coach called "The Madden Brothers". Similar in the Turkish version of The Voice, Gökhan Özoğuz also served as a solo coach from season three to four, before he was joined by Hakan Özoğuz for the following two seasons. But then, Gökhan goes as solo coach in the later seasons.
7. ^7 Season two of Turkish The Voice Kids was the first season to have four coaches among all versions of The Voice Kids. Afterwards, other versions around the world have added a fourth coach too.
8. ^8 English-American The Voice is also broadcast in Canada and some Caribbean countries and territories; people from all Canadian provinces (excluding Quebec) and from select Caribbean countries are allowed to join the show.
9. ^9 South African network M-Net is not to be confused with South Korean music channel Mnet.
10. ^10 Vocea României is also broadcast in Moldova; Moldovans are allowed to join the show, provided they have a biometric passport or a visa.
11. ^11 The Voice of Italy is also broadcast in San Marino and Vatican. However, people from Vatican City are not allowed to join the show.
12. ^12 The Voice – la plus belle voix is also broadcast in Luxembourg and Monaco. People from these countries can participate on the show.
13. ^13 Spanish La Voz is also broadcast in Andorra. People from Andorra are also allowed to join the show.
14. ^14 Although the Kazakh, Russian, and Ukrainian versions are never broadcast in the CIS area, people from other CIS countries (including Russia, Kazakhstan, and Ukraine) are allowed to join these shows.
15. ^15 A "supercoach" was introduced in the fourth season of Spanish La Voz Kids, who decided who should proceed to the next round. David Bisbal was the supercoach in that season.
16. ^16 Voice – Danmarks største stemme is also broadcast in Faroe Islands and Greenland. People from these countries are allowed to join the show.
17. ^17 The Belgian-Flemish version of The Voice Kids introduced a trio coach, which was the first in the franchise's history. A trio was also featured in the first season of Lithuania's Lietuvos balsas. Kartos.
18. ^18 La Voz Argentina is also broadcast in Uruguay. People from Uruguay are allowed to join the show.
19. ^19 In the fifteenth season of the English-American The Voice, a new round, called "The Comeback Stage", was created. It featured a fifth coach that saved eliminated contestants to have a second chance on the show. Several countries adapted this round to their respective versions.
20. ^20 In season two of The Voice Afrique Francophone, A'salfo and Charlotte Dipanda originally signed up to serve as coaches full-time. However, due to a postponement which made the season finished later than planned, A'salfo and Dipanda were not able to resume their duties for the last four live shows because of pre-arranged commitments. Youssoupha and Josey replaced them, respectively, and served as coaches until the end of the season. In the third season, Youssoupha returned once again as coach to replace Nayanka Bell for the live shows, who was unable to return due to the COVID-19 pandemic.
21. ^21 The Voice India is also broadcast in Sri Lanka. People from Sri Lanka are allowed to join the show.
22. ^22 Following the fraud scandal on the finale of Russian's The Voice Kids season six, the broadcaster closed the investigation by stating that there had been fraud and announced that it canceled the results. The producer announced that the nine finalists are all winners of the season.
23. ^23 The Voice Indonesia is also broadcast in East Timor. People from East Timor are allowed to join the show.
24. ^24 United Kingdom's ITV is not to be confused with Azerbaijan's itv network.
25. ^25 This country featured a kids' version before producing a regular edition.
26. ^26 First time in the history of The Voice franchise that a winner of a kids' version wins the adult version, a few years later, in the same country and with the same coach.
27. ^27 For the first and, so far, only time in the whole franchise, the finalists were all from the same team.
28. ^28 Due to the COVID-19 pandemic, Filipino's The Voice Teens declared one champion per team: Heart Salvador, Cydel Gabutero, Kendra Aguirre and Isang Manlapaz.
29. ^29 To celebrate the 10-year-anniversary of France's The Voice – la plus belle voix, an All-stars version was produced and it had five individual coaches. The All-stars format was then adapted in Finland, where it only featured three coaches.
30. ^30 For the first time in the history of The Voice, Australia was the first country to dedicate a version for family groups, who come to sing together, under the name The Voice Generations.
31. ^31 Longest produced series in the history of the entire franchise.
32. ^32 First ever series on the franchise to only have two coaches.
33. ^33 First ever series on the regular edition to only have three coaches.
