= List of The Voice Senior TV series =

The Voice Senior is a version of The Voice TV series franchise in which seniors participate.

== Versions ==
The first such variation was The Voice Senior from the Netherlands, which was followed by other international variants:

Franchise with a currently airing season
Franchise with an upcoming season
Franchise with an unknown status
Franchise that has ceased to air
Original version of The Voice Senior

Country/Region	Local title	Network	Winners	Coaches	Hosts
Arab World	The Voice Senior	MBC 1	Season 1, 2020: Abdou Yaghi	Melhem Zein; Samira Said; Najwa Karam; Hany Shaker	Annabella Hilal
Belgium; Flanders	The Voice Senior (Dutch)	vtm Website	Season 1, 2018: John Leo; Season 2, 2020: Roland Van Beeck	Current; Walter Grootaers; Sam Gooris (2–); Karen Damen (2–); André Hazes jr. (2–); Former; Helmut Lotti (1); Dana Winner (1); Natalia (1)	An Lemmens
Brazil	The Voice + The Voice Senior	Rede Globo; Website	Season 1, 2021: Zé Alexanddre; Season 2, 2022: Vera de Maria Maga	Ludmilla; Claudia Leitte (1); Daniel (1); Mumuzinho (1); Fafá de Belém (2); Carlinhos Brown (2); Toni Garrido (2)	André Marques; Thalita Rebouças (1)(backstage); Thaís Fersoza (2) (backstage)
Colombia	La Voz Senior; The Voice Senior	Caracol Television	Season 1, 2021: Maria Nelfi; Season 2, 2022: Chencho	Andrés Cepeda; Natalia Jiménez; Jesús Navarro	Laura Tobón; Laura Acuña
Finland	The Voice Senior	Nelonen	Season 1, 2022: Jaska Makynen	Michael Monroe; Tarja Turunen; Ressu Redford	Heikki Paasonen; Elina Kottonen
Germany	The Voice Senior	Sat.1	Season 1, 2018–19: Dan Lucas; Season 2, 2019: Monika Smets	Mark Forster (1); Sasha Schmitz (1–2); The BossHoss (duo, 1–2); Yvonne Catterfeld (1–2); Michael Patrick Kelly (2)	Lena Gercke (1–2); Thore Schölermann (1–2)
Italy	The Voice Senior	Rai 1	Season 1, 2020: Erminio Sinni; Season 2, 2021–22: Annibale Giannarelli	Current; Gigi D'Alessio; Loredana Bertè; Clementino; Orietta Berti (2–); Former; Al Bano & Jasmine Carrisi (duo) (1)	Antonella Clerici
Lithuania	Lietuvos balsas. Senjorai; The Voice of Lithuania. Senior	LNK	Season 1, 2019: Gedeminas Jepšas	Monika Marija; Justinas Jarutis; Inga Jankauskaitė; Mantas Jankavičius	Rolandas Mackevičius; Karolina Meschino
Mexico	La Voz Senior; The Voice Senior	Azteca Uno; Website	Season 1, 2019: Salvador Rivera; Season 2, 2021: Omar Alexander	Lupillo Rivera (1); Yahir; Belinda; Ricardo Montaner; María José (2)	Jimena Pérez (1); Eddy Vilard (2)
Netherlands (Original)	The Voice Senior; Original	RTL 4 Website	Season 1, 2018: Jimi Bellmartin; Season 2, 2019: Ruud Hermans; Season 3, 2020: Henny Thijssen; Season 4, 2021: Phil Bee	Current; Ilse DeLange; Angela Groothuizen; Frans Bauer (2–); Gerard Joling (solo, 3–); Former; Geer & Goor (duo, 1); Marco Borsato (1–2)	Current; Martijn Krabbé; Lieke van Lexmond (2–); Former; Wendy van Dijk (1)
Peru	La Voz Senior; The Voice Senior	Frecuencia Latina	Season 1, 2021: Mito Plaza; Season 2, 2022: Javier Carranza; Season 3, TBA: Upcoming season	Eva Ayllón; Pimpinela (duo); Daniela Darcourt; Tony Succar	Cristian Rivero
Poland	The Voice Senior	TVP2; Website	Season 1, 2019: Jola, Krystyna, & Ela Szydłowskie; Season 2, 2021: Barbara Parzeczewska; Season 3, 2022: Krzysztof Prusik; Season 4, 2023: Zbigniew Zaranek; Season 5, 2024: Regina Bavcevic; Season 6, 2025: Wojciech Bardowski; Season 7, 2026: Violetta Kapcewicz; Season 8, 2027: Upcoming season	{{plainlist|: Current; Andrzej Piaseczny (1–2, 6–); Robert Janowski (6–); Alicja Majewska (1–3, 7–); Majka Jeżowska (7–); Former; Marek Piekarczyk (1); Urszula Dudziak (1); Izabela Trojanowska (2); Witold Paszt^{†} (2–3); Piotr Cugowski (3–4); Maryla Rodowicz (3–5); Alicja Węgorzewska (4–5); Tomasz Szczepanik (4–5); Halina Frąckowiak (5); Małgorzata Ostrowska (6); Tatiana Okupnik (6)	Current; Marta Manowska (1–3, 5–); Łukasz Nowicki (7–); Former; Marek Grąbczewski (backstage); Tomasz Kammel (1); Małgorzata Tomaszewska–Słomina (4); Nina Busk^{†} (backstage, 1); Rafał Brzozowski (2–5); Robert Stockinger (6)
Russia	Голос. 60+ The Voice 60+	Channel One; Website	Season 1, 2018: Lidia Muzaleva; Season 2, 2019: Leonid Sergienko; Season 3, 2020: Dina Yudina; Season 4, 2021: Mikhail Serebryakov^{†}; Season 5, 2022: Raisa Dmitrenko	Current; Elena Vaenga (3, 5–); Igor Kornelyuk (5–); Alexander Malinin (5–); Valeriy Syutkin (5–); Former; Leonid Agutin (1); Valery Meladze (1); Pelageya (1–2); Valeriya (2); Mikhail Boyarsky (2); Lev Leshchenko (1–3); Tamara Gverdtsiteli (3); Garik Sukachov (3); Stas Namin (4); Laima Vaikule (4); Valery Leontiev (4); Oleg Gazmanov (4)	Current; Larisa Guzeeva (5–); Former; Dmitry Nagiev (1–4)
Spain; Andorra	La Voz Senior	Antena 3	Season 1, 2019: Helena Bianco; Season 2, 2020: Naida Abanovich; Season 3, 2022: Gwen Perry	Antonio Orozco; David Bisbal (1); Pablo López (1); Paulina Rubio (1); David Bustamante (2–3); Rosana (2); Pastora Soler (2); Niña Pastori (3); José Mercé (3)	Eva González
Thailand	The Voice Senior	PPTV36; Website	Season 1, 2019: Sanae Damkham; Season 2, 2020: Ah Fort	Parn Thanaporn (1); Stamp Apiwat; Tam Charas; Kong Saharat; Took Viyada (2)	Songsit Roongnophakunsri

== See also ==
- The Voice (franchise)
- List of The Voice Kids TV series
