= La Voz Senior (Mexican TV series) season 2 =

Television season

La Voz Senior
- Season 2
- Hosted by: Eddy Vilard
- Coaches: Ricardo Montaner; Belinda; María José; Yahir

Release
- Original network: Azteca Uno
- Original release: April 27 – May 31, 2021

Season chronology
- ← Previous; Season 1

The second season of La Voz Senior premiered on 27 April 2021, on Azteca Uno. Ricardo Montaner, Yahir, and Belinda returned as coaches from the previous season, meanwhile María José joined the coaching panel, replacing Lupillo Rivera. Eddy Vilard joined as the show's host.

== Coaches ==
La Voz Senior season 2 coaches

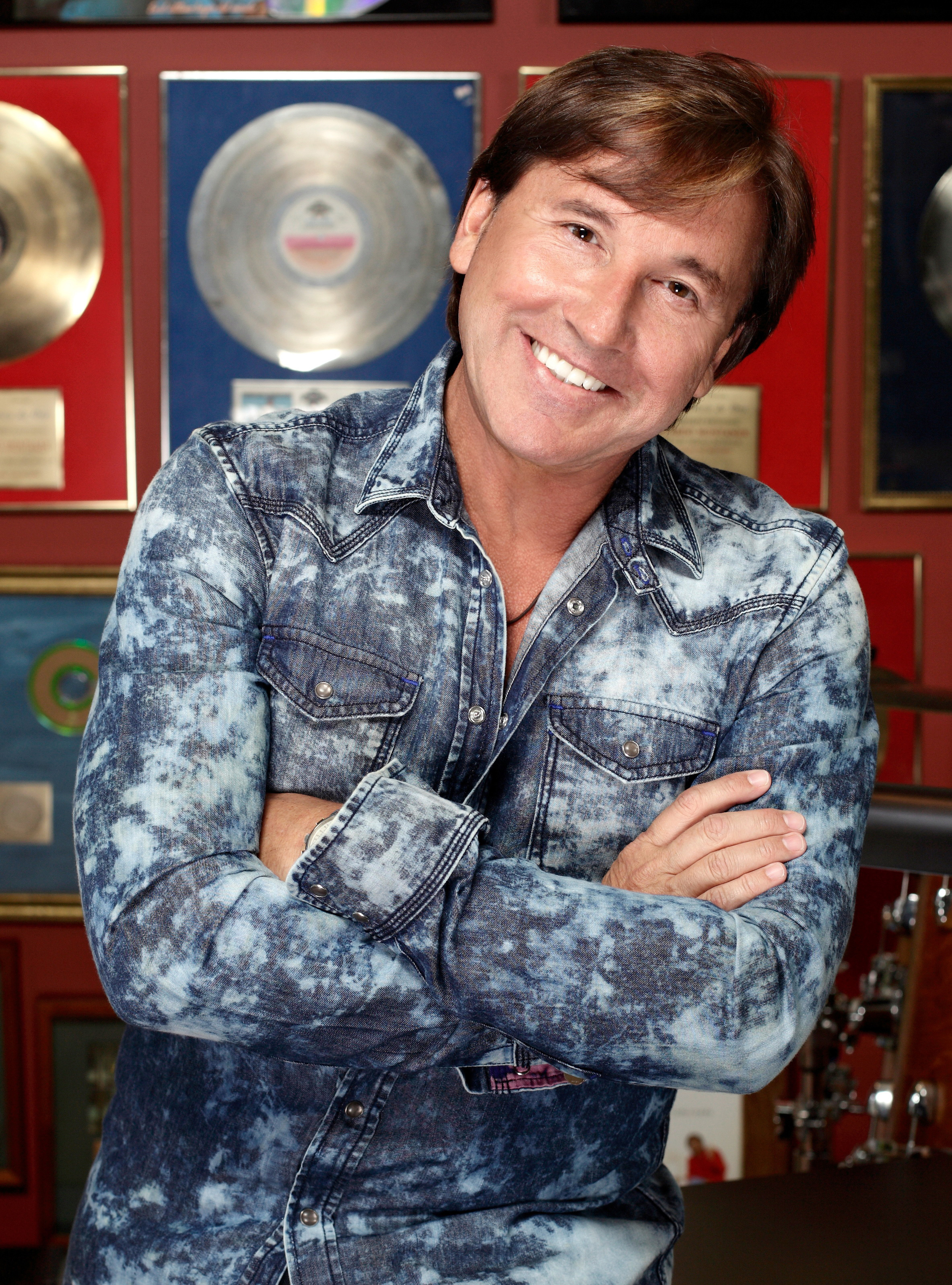
Ricardo Montaner

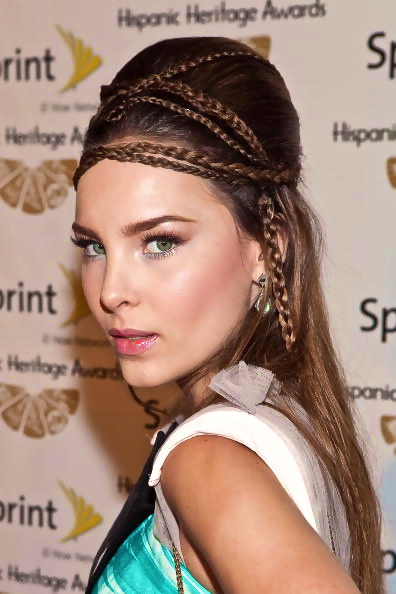
Belinda

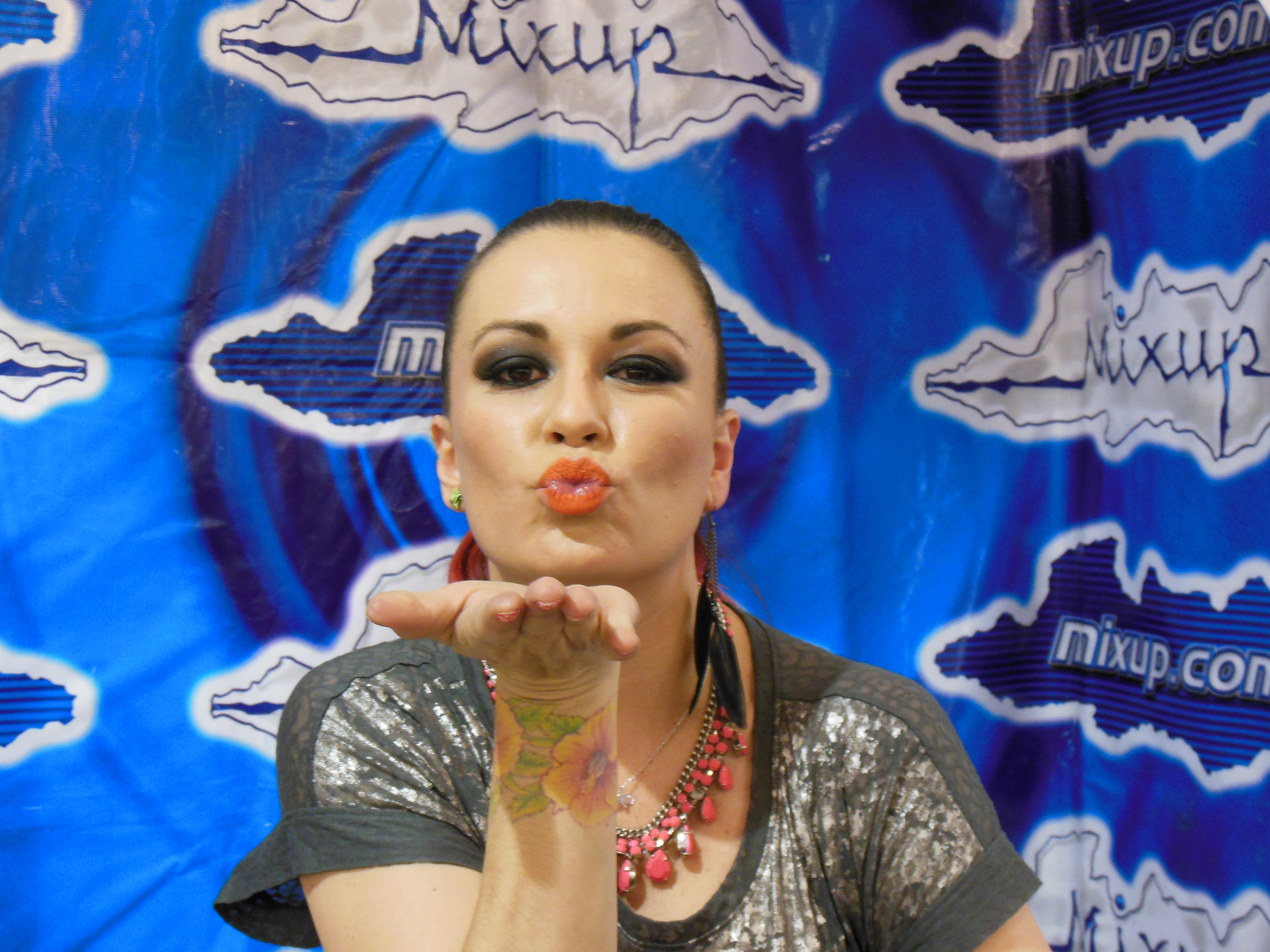
María José

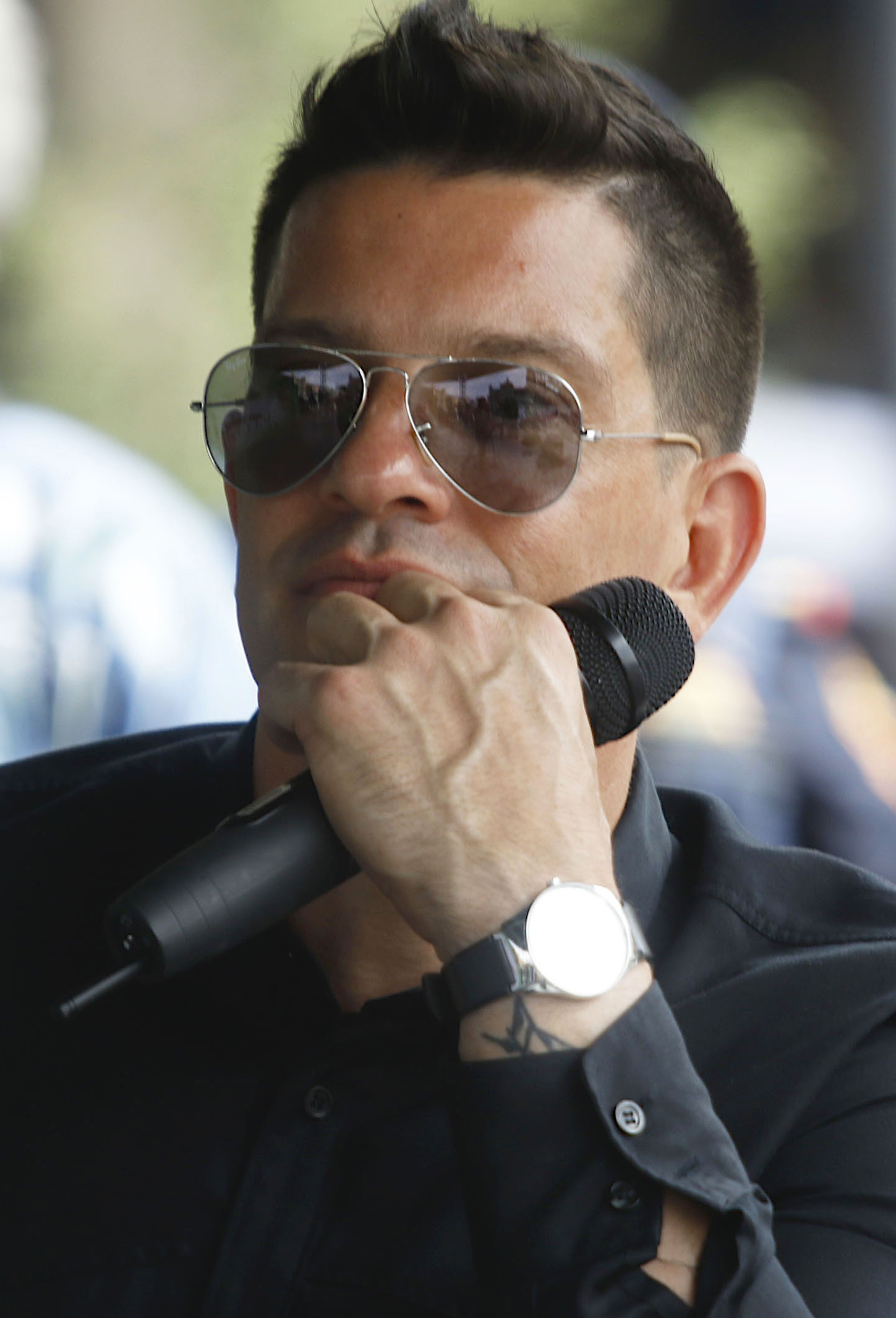
Yahir

Filming for the second season started in late 2020, revealing Ricardo Montaner, Belinda, María José and Yahir as the coaches. But, it wasn't until April 2021 that they were officially confirmed by the broadcaster. This marks Belinda's fifth, Montaner's fourth, and María's and Yahir's third season coaching in the Mexican versions of La Voz.

On 31 May 2021, Omar Alexander was announced as the winner, marking coach Ricardo's fourth victory throughout the La Voz franchise. Also, this marked La Vox Mexico's first back-to-back coach to win in seasons.

== Teams ==
Color key

- Winner
- Runner-up
- Eliminated in the Finale
- Eliminated in the Semifinal
- Eliminated in the Knockouts

| Coaches | Top 48 artists | | | | | |
|---|---|---|---|---|---|---|
| Ricardo Montaner | | | | | | |
| Ricardo Montaner | Omar Alexander | Manolo | Rossy Guizar | Juan Manuel | Abbel Kaanan | Marta Bella |
| Ricardo Montaner | Zoila Regina | Miguel Ángel Grageda | Rosa Velia | Francisco Navarro | Maximino Juárez | Any Ochoa |
| Belinda | | | | | | |
| Belinda | Baby Batíz | Enrique Avilés | Viola Dorantes | Raúl Alvarez | Carlos Oceguera | Alinna |
| Belinda | Roy Flores | Sol de México | Ángel Alonso | Chicho Barragán | Arturo Masson | Raúl Canseco |
| María José | | | | | | |
| María José | Rossy Rodríguez | Hilda Gil | Lucero Campos | Armando Valdez | Manuel Beltrán | Raúl Lerma |
| María José | Tonny Fox | José Luis Acevedo | Juan Manuel | Luis Jorge | José Becerra | El Toskano |
| Yahir | | | | | | |
| Yahir | Mr. Clayton | La Istmeña | Freddy Persa | Jimmy | Letty Brown | Lolita Enríquez |
| Yahir | Adaliz | Juan José Castillo | Pippa | José Gerardo | Antonio Gaytán | Patty Carr |

== Blind Auditions ==
In the Blind Auditions, each coach had to complete their teams with 12 contestants.

Color key
| ✔ | Coach pressed "QUIERO TU VOZ" button |
| | Artist defaulted to a coach's team |
| | Artist elected a coach's team |
| | Artist eliminated with no coach pressing his or her "QUIERO TU VOZ" button |

=== Episode 1 (April 27) ===
The coaches performed "Bésame Mucho" at the beginning of the episode.

| Order | Artist | Age | Hometown | Song | Coach's and artist's choices | | | |
| Order | Artist | Age | Hometown | Song | Ricardo | Belinda | María | Yahir |
|---|---|---|---|---|---|---|---|---|
| 1 | Baby Bátiz | 70 | Tijuana, Baja California | "Oh! Darling" | ✔ | ✔ | ✔ | ✔ |
| 2 | Alfonso Cacique | N/A | Mexico City | "Amorcito Corazón" | – | – | – | – |
| 3 | Pippa | 64 | Cancún, Quintana Roo | "Leona Dormida" | – | ✔ | ✔ | ✔ |
| 4 | Abbel Kaanan | 60 | Mexico City | "Can't Take My Eyes Off You" | ✔ | ✔ | ✔ | ✔ |
| 5 | Chicho Barragán | 62 | Tampico, Tamaulipas | "Ladies Night" | – | ✔ | ✔ | ✔ |
| 6 | Lucero Campos | 64 | Mexico City | "Mentiras" | ✔ | ✔ | ✔ | ✔ |
| 7 | Don Beto | 66 | Veracruz, Veracruz | "Los Mandados" | – | – | – | – |
| 8 | José Gerardo | 67 | Ecatepec, Mexico State | "Un Hombre Normal" | – | – | ✔ | ✔ |
| 9 | Su Norman | 64 | Mexico City | "Rosas en el mar" | – | – | – | – |
| 10 | Armando Valdez | 60 | Guaymas, Sonora | "Todo Pasará" | – | ✔ | ✔ | ✔ |
| 11 | Maximino Juárez | 69 | Chihuahua, Chihuahua | "Qué bonito amor" | ✔ | ✔ | ✔ | – |
| 12 | Juan Manuel | 67 | Mexico City | "Mackie La Navaja" | ✔ | ✔ | ✔ | ✔ |

=== Episode 2 (May 3) ===
| Order | Artist | Age | Hometown | Song | Coach's and artist's choices | | | |
| Order | Artist | Age | Hometown | Song | Ricardo | Belinda | María | Yahir |
|---|---|---|---|---|---|---|---|---|
| 1 | Hilda Gil | N/A | Aguascalientes, Aguascalientes | "Desdén" | – | – | ✔ | ✔ |
| 2 | Raul Canseco | N/A | Mexico City | "Júrame" | – | ✔ | – | ✔ |
| 3 | Ana Julia | 61 | Aguascalientes, Aguascalientes | "El Sol No Regresa" | – | – | – | – |
| 4 | Jimmy | 65 | Naucalpan, México State | "Born to be Wild" | ✔ | ✔ | ✔ | ✔ |
| 5 | Lolita Enriquez | 78 | Mexico City | "Cómo Han Pasado Los Años" | – | ✔ | – | ✔ |
| 6 | Luis Humberto | 61 | Guadalajara, Jalisco | "O me voy o te vas" | – | – | – | – |
| 7 | Manuel Beltrán | 65 | Guadalajara. Jalisco | "Smoke Gets in Your Eyes" | ✔ | ✔ | ✔ | ✔ |
| 8 | Efren Cantator | 62 | Boca del Río, Veracruz | "No soy el aire" | – | – | – | – |
| 9 | Carlos Oceguera | 65 | Querétaro, Querétaro | "La Flor de la Canela" | – | ✔ | – | – |
| 10 | Rossy Guizar | 60 | Monterrey, Nuevo León | "El Color de Tus Ojos" | ✔ | ✔ | ✔ | ✔ |
| 11 | Eliseo Maldonado | 66 | Mexico City | "¿Y Quién Puede Ser?" | – | – | – | – |
| 12 | Omar Alexander | 66 | Mexico City | "Dueño de nada" | ✔ | ✔ | ✔ | ✔ |

=== Episode 3 (May 4) ===
| Order | Artist | Age | Hometown | Song | Coach's and artist's choices | | | |
| Order | Artist | Age | Hometown | Song | Ricardo | Belinda | María | Yahir |
|---|---|---|---|---|---|---|---|---|
| 1 | Sol de México | 70 | Mexico City | "Historia de un Amor" | – | ✔ | – | ✔ |
| 2 | Raúl Lerma | 60 | Parral, Chihuahua | "Buenos Dias Amor" | – | – | ✔ | – |
| 3 | Maka | 67 | Puebla, Puebla | "Tú de Que Vas" | – | – | – | – |
| 4 | Miguel Ángel Graceda | 63 | Mexico City | "Si Dios me quita la vida" | ✔ | ✔ | – | ✔ |
| 5 | Juan José Castillo | 74 | Cadereyta Jiménez, Nuevo León | "Y nos dieron las diez" | ✔ | ✔ | ✔ | ✔ |
| 6 | Arturo Masson | 60 | Tulancingo, Hidalgo | "A Puro Dolor" | – | ✔ | ✔ | ✔ |
| 7 | La Istmeña | 66 | Istmo de Tehuantepec, Oaxaca | "Cancion Mixteca" | – | – | – | ✔ |
| 8 | Bety Reyes | 69 | Querétaro, Querétaro | "Fallaste corazón" | – | – | – | – |
| 9 | José Becerra | 73 | Querétaro, Querétaro | "Urge" | – | – | ✔ | – |
| 10 | Alinna | 61 | Querétaro, Querétaro | "Aprendiz" | ✔ | ✔ | ✔ | ✔ |
| 11 | Palotito García | 74 | Pachuca, Hidalgo | "Nunca digas que te quise" | – | – | – | – |
| 12 | Rosa Velia Aguilar | 76 | Torreón, Coahuila | "Ave María" | ✔ | – | – | – |
| 13 | Arturo Gutiérrez | 65 | Mexico City | "El Siete Mares" | – | – | – | – |
| 14 | Adaliz | 61 | Mexico City | "Yerbero Moderno" | ✔ | ✔ | ✔ | ✔ |

=== Episode 4 (May 10) ===
| Order | Artist | Age | Hometown | Song | Coach's and artist's choices | | | |
| Order | Artist | Age | Hometown | Song | Ricardo | Belinda | María | Yahir |
|---|---|---|---|---|---|---|---|---|
| 1 | Raul Alvarez | 71 | Cholula, Puebla | "New York, New York" | – | ✔ | ✔ | – |
| 2 | Lourdes | 68 | Mexico City | "La Feria de las Flores" | – | – | – | – |
| 3 | Tonny Foxx | N/A | Mexico City | "Amor, Amor" | – | – | ✔ | – |
| 4 | Any Ochoa | 71 | Mexico City | "Nunca es suficiente" | ✔ | ✔ | ✔ | ✔ |
| 5 | Ana Guadalupe | N/A | Merida, Yucatán | "Tres Veces te Engañe" | – | – | – | – |
| 6 | Juan Manuel | 62 | Mexico City | "Blue Suede Shoes" | ✔ | ✔ | ✔ | ✔ |
| 7 | Ángel Alonso | 66 | Puebla, Puebla | "Vuelve Primavera" | – | ✔ | ✔ | ✔ |
| 8 | Antonio Gaytán | 71 | Morelia, Michoacán | "Amante a la Antigua" | – | – | – | ✔ |
| 9 | Angelita Valdez | N/A | Mexico City | "Motivos" | – | – | – | – |
| 10 | Zoila Regina | 72 | Oaxaca, Oaxaca | "Piensa en mi" | ✔ | ✔ | ✔ | ✔ |
| 11 | Roy Flores | 60 | Ebano, San Luis Potosí | "Payaso" | – | ✔ | – | – |
| 12 | Carlos Mendoza | 78 | Acapulco, Guerrero | "Me Dedique a Perderte" | – | – | – | – |
| 13 | Letty Brown | 64 | Veracruz, Veracruz | "Serenata Huasteca" | – | ✔ | ✔ | ✔ |
| 14 | José Luis Acevedo | N/A | Santo Tomás, Mexico State | "Como Quien Pierde una Estrella" | – | – | ✔ | – |

=== Episode 5 (May 11) ===
| Order | Artist | Age | Hometown | Song | Coach's and artist's choices | | | |
| Order | Artist | Age | Hometown | Song | Ricardo | Belinda | María | Yahir |
|---|---|---|---|---|---|---|---|---|
| 1 | Patty Carr | 63 | Mexico City | "Last Dance" | – | – | – | ✔ |
| 2 | Luis Jorge | N/A | Mexico City | "Quiero Dormir Cansado" | – | – | ✔ | – |
| 3 | Lázaro Arroyo | 74 | Acapulco, Guerrero | "Inolvidable" | – | – | – | – |
| 4 | Viola Dorantes | N/A | Veracruz, Veracruz | "Que nadie sepa mi sufrir" | – | ✔ | – | – |
| 5 | Francisco Navarro | 70 | Ocotlán, Jalisco | "Fruto Robado" | ✔ | ✔ | ✔ | ✔ |
| 6 | Mr. Clayton | 62 | Tijuana, Baja California | "Vehicle" | ✔ | ✔ | ✔ | ✔ |
| 7 | Bertha Ofelia | 74 | Culiacán, Sinaloa | "Paloma Negra" | – | – | – | – |
| 8 | Enrique Villanueva | N/A | Morelia, Michoacán | "El Ausente" | – | – | – | – |
| 9 | Manolo | 63 | Aguascalientes, Aguascalientes | "Amnesia" | ✔ | – | – | – |
| 10 | Rossy Rodríguez | 61 | Culiacán, Sinaloa | "Como una ola" | ✔ | ✔ | ✔ | ✔ |
| 11 | Freddy Persa | N/A | Villahermosa, Tabasco | "¿Y cómo es él?" | – | ✔ | ✔ | ✔ |
| 12 | Enrique Avilés | N/A | Cerro Azul, Veracruz | "Dos Gardenias para tí" | – | ✔ | ✔ | Team full |
| 13 | El Toskano | 66 | La Paz, Baja California Sur | "Después de tí... ¿Qué?" | – | Team full | ✔ | Team full |
| 14 | Marta Bella | N/A | Ciudad Victoria, Tamaulipas | "Me Cuesta tanto Olvidarte" | ✔ | Team full | Team full | Team full |

== Knockouts ==
The Knockouts round started on 17 May. In this round, three contestants of each team compete face to face in a knockout. The artist who is chosen by their coach as the winner advances to the Semifinal.

Color key
| Artist won the Knockout and advanced to The Semifinal |
| Artist lost the Knockout and was eliminated |
| Artist withdrew from the competition |

Knockout performances
| Episode | Coach | Order | Song | Artists | | Song |
| Episode | Coach | Order | Song | Winner | Loser | Song |
|---|---|---|---|---|---|---|
| Episode 6 (Monday, May 17, 2021) | Belinda | 1 | "Como Sufro" | Enrique Avilés | Chicho Barragán | "Tómbola" |
| Episode 6 (Monday, May 17, 2021) | Belinda | 1 | "Como Sufro" | Enrique Avilés | Arturo Masson | "¿Quieres ser Mi Amante?" |
| Episode 6 (Monday, May 17, 2021) | Ricardo Montaner | 2 | "A Mi Manera" | Manolo | Maximino Juárez | "Paloma Querida" |
| Episode 6 (Monday, May 17, 2021) | Ricardo Montaner | 2 | "A Mi Manera" | Manolo | Any Ochoa | "Como Tu Mujer" |
| Episode 6 (Monday, May 17, 2021) | María José | 3 | "Como Fui a Enamorarme de Ti" | Hilda Gil | José Becerra | "Cien Años" |
| Episode 6 (Monday, May 17, 2021) | María José | 3 | "Como Fui a Enamorarme de Ti" | Hilda Gil | El Toskano | "Te Quiero Tal Como Eres" |
| Episode 6 (Monday, May 17, 2021) | Yahir | 4 | "Light My Fire" | Jimmy | Antonio Gaytán | "Vive" |
| Episode 6 (Monday, May 17, 2021) | Yahir | 4 | "Light My Fire" | Jimmy | Patty Carr | "Tu Voz" |
| Episode 6 (Monday, May 17, 2021) | Belinda | 5 | "You Really Got Me" | Baby Batíz | Sol de México | "¿Cómo fue?" |
| Episode 6 (Monday, May 17, 2021) | Belinda | 5 | "You Really Got Me" | Baby Batíz | Ángel Alonso | "Cómo Te Voy A Olvidar" |
| Episode 6 (Monday, May 17, 2021) | Ricardo Montaner | 6 | "Te fallé" | Rossy Guizar | Francisco Navarro | "Perfume De Gardenias" |
| Episode 6 (Monday, May 17, 2021) | Ricardo Montaner | 6 | "Te fallé" | Rossy Guizar | Rosa Velia | "Tata Dios" |
| Episode 7 (Tuesday, May 18, 2021) | María José | 1 | "Tu Significas Todo Para Mi" | Armando Valdez | Juan Manuel | "Vivir Mi Vida" |
| Episode 7 (Tuesday, May 18, 2021) | María José | 1 | "Tu Significas Todo Para Mi" | Armando Valdez | Luis Jorge | "Vivir así es morir de amor" |
| Episode 7 (Tuesday, May 18, 2021) | Yahir | 2 | "Qué será de ti" | Freddy Persea | Pippa | "A donde quiera" |
| Episode 7 (Tuesday, May 18, 2021) | Yahir | 2 | "Qué será de ti" | Freddy Persea | José Gerardo | "Pídeme" |
| Episode 7 (Tuesday, May 18, 2021) | Ricardo Montaner | 3 | "I Saw Her Standing There" | Juan Manuel | Miguel Angel Grageda | "Perdóname" |
| Episode 7 (Tuesday, May 18, 2021) | Ricardo Montaner | 3 | "I Saw Her Standing There" | Juan Manuel | Zoila Regina | "La Gata Bajo La Lluvia" |
| Episode 7 (Tuesday, May 18, 2021) | Yahir | 4 | "Fly Me to the Moon" | Mr. Clayton | Adaliz | "El Recuento De Los Daños" |
| Episode 7 (Tuesday, May 18, 2021) | Yahir | 4 | "Fly Me to the Moon" | Mr. Clayton | Juan José Castillo | "El Día Que Puedas" |
| Episode 7 (Tuesday, May 18, 2021) | Belinda | 5 | "Pena Negra" | Viola Dorantes | Alinna | "Como yo nadie te ha amado" |
| Episode 7 (Tuesday, May 18, 2021) | Belinda | 5 | "Pena Negra" | Viola Dorantes | Roy Flores | "Llamarada" |
| Episode 8 (Monday, May 24, 2021) | María José | 1 | "" | Rossy Rodriguez | Tonny Foxx | "" |
| Episode 8 (Monday, May 24, 2021) | María José | 1 | "" | Rossy Rodriguez | José Luis Acevedo | "" |
| Episode 8 (Monday, May 24, 2021) | Belinda | 2 | "" | Raúl Álvarez | Carlos Oceguera | "" |
| Episode 8 (Monday, May 24, 2021) | Belinda | 2 | "" | Raúl Álvarez | Raúl Canseco | "" |
| Episode 8 (Monday, May 24, 2021) | Yahir | 3 | "" | La Istmeña | Letty Brown | "" |
| Episode 8 (Monday, May 24, 2021) | Yahir | 3 | "" | La Istmeña | Lolita Enríquez | "" |
| Episode 8 (Monday, May 24, 2021) | María José | 4 | "" | Lucero Campos | Manuel Beltrán | "" |
| Episode 8 (Monday, May 24, 2021) | María José | 4 | "" | Lucero Campos | Raúl Lerma | "" |
| Episode 8 (Monday, May 24, 2021) | Ricardo Montaner | 5 | "" | Omar Alexander | Marta Bella | "" |
| Episode 8 (Monday, May 24, 2021) | Ricardo Montaner | 5 | "" | Omar Alexander | Abbel Kaanan | "" |

Non-competition performances
| Order | Performers | Song |
|---|---|---|
| 7.1 | María José featuring Yahir | "Ya No Me Acuerdo Más de Ti" |
| 8.1 | Belinda featuring María José | "Bella Traición" |
| 8.2 | Yahir and Belinda | "Me cuesta tanto olvidarte" |

== Final Phase ==
Color key
| Artist was saved by his/her coach |
| Artist was eliminated |

=== Week 1: Semifinal (May 25) ===
In the Semifinal, the sixteen remaining participants performed in order to become one of their coach's choice to advance into the Finale. Each coach advanced with two artists, while the other two were eliminated.

Episode 9
| Order | Coach | Artist | Song | Result |
|---|---|---|---|---|
| 1 | Ricardo Montaner | Juan Manuel | "" | Eliminated |
| 2 | María José | Lucero Campos | "Hoy Tengo Ganas de Ti" | Eliminated |
| 3 | Yahir | Jimmy | "Unchain My Heart" | Eliminated |
| 4 | Belinda | Raúl Álvarez | "Tus Ojos" | Eliminated |
| 5 | Ricardo Montaner | Rossy Guizar | "Lo Que Son Las Cosas" | Eliminated |
| 6 | María José | Armando Valdez | "Tu Voz" | Eliminated |
| 7 | Yahir | La Istmeña | "Mi Eterno Amor Secreto" | Yahir's choice |
| 8 | Belinda | Enrique Avilés | "Y Volveré" | Belinda's choice |
| 9 | Ricardo Montaner | Omar Alexander | "Mentira" | Ricardo's choice |
| 10 | María José | Hilda Gil | "No Volveré" | María's choice |
| 11 | Yahir | Mr. Clayton | "Yesterday" | Yahir's choice |
| 12 | Belinda | Viola Dorantes | "" | Eliminated |
| 13 | Ricardo Montaner | Manolo | "" | Ricardo's choice |
| 14 | María José | Rossy Rodríguez | "Castillos" | María's choice |
| 15 | Yahir | Freddy Persa | "" | Eliminated |
| 16 | Belinda | Baby Batíz | "Piece of My Heart" | Belinda's choice |

=== Week 2: Finale (May 31) ===
The Finale was prerecorded. In the first round, the participants sang a solo song. After the performances, each coach had to choose one artist to advance to the second round. In this round, the four finalists performed their song from the Blind auditions. The show's production shot four different winning results (one per finalist), but only the chosen winner by the public at home one was shown on TV.

==== First Round ====
Episode 10
| Order | Coach | Artist | Song | Result |
|---|---|---|---|---|
| 1 | Belinda | Enrique Avilés | "El Cantante" | Eliminated |
| 2 | Yahir | La Istmeña | "La Media Vuelta" | Eliminated |
| 3 | María José | Rossy Rodriguez | "Acaríciame" | María's choice |
| 4 | Ricardo Montaner | Omar Alexander | "Porque yo te amo" | Ricardo's choice |
| 5 | Ricardo Montaner | Manolo | "" | Eliminated |
| 6 | María José | Hilda Gil | "Acá Entre Nos" | Eliminated |
| 7 | Yahir | Mr. Clayton | "You Are So Beautiful" | Yahir's choice |
| 8 | Belinda | Baby Batíz | "Venus" | Belinda's choice |

Non-competition performances
| Order | Performers | Song |
|---|---|---|
| 10.1 | Yahir | "La Locura" |
| 10.2 | Belinda | "En la Obscuridad" |
| 10.3 | María José | "No Soy Una Señora" |
| 10.4 | Ricardo Montaner | "Dejame Llorar" |

==== Second Round ====
| Order | Coach | Artist | Song | Result |
|---|---|---|---|---|
| 1 | Yahir | Mr. Clayton | "Vehicle" | Runner-up |
| 2 | María José | Rossy Rodriguez | "Como una ola" | Runner-up |
| 3 | Belinda | Baby Batíz | "Oh! Darling" | Runner-up |
| 4 | Ricardo Montaner | Omar Alexander | "Dueño de nada" | Winner |

== Elimination Chart ==
=== Color key ===
Artist's info

- Team Montaner
- Team Belinda
- Team María José
- Team Yahir

Result details

- Winner
- Runner-up
- Saved by his/her coach
- Eliminated

Final Phase Results per week
| Artists | Week 1 Semifinal | Week 2 Finale | |
| Artists | Week 1 Semifinal | Round 1 | Round 2 |
|---|---|---|---|
| Omar Alexander | Safe | Safe | Winner |
| Baby Batíz | Safe | Safe | Runner-up |
| Rossy Rodríguez | Safe | Safe | Runner-up |
| Enrique Avilés | Safe | Safe | Runner-up |
| Mr. Clayton | Safe | Eliminated | Eliminated (Finale, Round 1) |
| Manolo | Safe | Eliminated | Eliminated (Finale, Round 1) |
| Hilda Gil | Safe | Eliminated | Eliminated (Finale, Round 1) |
| La Istmeña | Safe | Eliminated | Eliminated (Finale, Round 1) |
| Viola Dorantes | Eliminated | Eliminated (Week 1) | |
| Juan Manuel | Eliminated | Eliminated (Week 1) | |
| Lucero Campos | Eliminated | Eliminated (Week 1) | |
| Jimmy | Eliminated | Eliminated (Week 1) | |
| Raúl Álvarez | Eliminated | Eliminated (Week 1) | |
| Rossy Guizar | Eliminated | Eliminated (Week 1) | |
| Armando Valdez | Eliminated | Eliminated (Week 1) | |
| Freddy Persa | Eliminated | Eliminated (Week 1) | |

== Ratings ==
| Show | Episode | Air date | Timeslot (CT) | Viewers (millions) |
|---|---|---|---|---|
| 1 | "Blind Auditions, Part 1" | April 27, 2021 | Tuesday 7:30 p.m. | 1.3 |
| 2 | "Blind Auditions, Part 2" | May 3, 2021 | Monday 7:30 p.m. | 1.2 |
| 3 | "Blind Auditions, Part 3" | May 4, 2021 | Tuesday 7:30 p.m. | 1.3 |
| 4 | "Blind Auditions, Part 4" | May 10, 2021 | Monday 7:30 p.m. | 1.0 |
| 5 | "Blind Auditions, Part 5" | May 11, 2021 | Tuesday 7:30 p.m. | 1.2 |
| 6 | "The Knockouts, Part 1" | May 17, 2021 | Monday 7:30 p.m. | 1.3 |
| 7 | "The Knockouts, Part 2" | May 18, 2021 | Tuesday 7:30 p.m. | 1.4 |
| 8 | "The Knockouts, Part 3" | May 24, 2021 | Monday 7:30 p.m. | 1.2 |
| 9 | "Semifinal" | May 25, 2021 | Tuesday 7:30 p.m. | 1.3 |
| 10 | "Finale" | May 31, 2021 | Monday 7:30 p.m. | 1.5 |
