= The Voice Senior (Dutch TV series) =

- Genre: Reality television
- Created by: John de Mol Jr.
- Developed by: Talpa Content
- Directed by: Martijn Nieman; Jeroen van Zalk; Sander Vahle
- Presented by: Martijn Krabbé; Wendy van Dijk; Lieke van Lexmond
- Starring: The Voice of Holland Band
- Judges: Angela Groothuizen; Gerard Joling; Gordon Heuckeroth; Ilse DeLange; Marco Borsato; Frans Bauer
- Voices of: Martijn Krabbé
- Theme music composer: Martijn Schimmer
- Country of origin: Netherlands
- Original language: Dutch
- No. of seasons: 4
- No. of episodes: 19

Production
- Producer: Talpa Productions
- Production location: Studio 24, Hilversum
- Running time: 120 minutes (inc. adverts)

Original release
- Network: RTL 4 (2018–2021)
- Release: 24 August 2018 – 8 October 2021

Related
- The Voice of Holland; The Voice Kids

The Voice Senior is a Dutch talent-search television program produced by Talpa Productions which is broadcast on RTL 4. The show is based on the concept of The Voice of Holland and The Voice Kids, both of which were also created by John de Mol Jr. However, participants must be older than sixty.

== Format ==
The show consists of four different phases: production audition, Blind Audition, The Knockouts and the Live Finale. The production auditions are not filmed, here only the good singers are selected by the program to go to the Blind Auditions.

=== The Blind Auditions ===
The blind auditions are similar to The Voice of Holland and The Voice Kids. The contestants sing during the blind auditions while the chairs of the four judges/coaches are turned over. Each candidate has the chance to sing a song of their choice for about a minute and a half. The coaches can only choose the contestant on the basis of musicality and voice by pressing the button, causing their chairs turn around and facing the artist. If two or more coaches want the same artist, the artist can choose which coach he or she wants to continue in the program. The Blind Auditions will end when all teams are full.

=== The Knockouts ===
Each coach pairs two or three singers from his team who have to compete against each other by performing a song chosen by the coach. After the Knockouts, the coach chooses one contestant from each pairto to advance the next round. In the end, every coach retains two contestants.

=== The Finale ===
The remaining two contestants from each team will be in the final. The Live finale will be broadcast live on RTL 4. The contestants are mentored by their coach and choose a song that they want to sing in the final. The coach then decides one act to remain, the other act will then be eliminated. The final winner is chosen by the public at home by televoting. Unlike the other editions, the final is not broadcast live. The final is recorded in advance and stops before the results are announced. Then they switch to a live late night program at RTL 4 in 2018 this was RTL Late Night with Twan Huys and in 2019 to BEAU. In those programs they will interview the jury members, presenters and the last four finalists. Thereafter the winner will be announced live in that program.

== Coaches and hosts ==
=== Coaches ===
On 1 December 2017, three coaches from the adult as well as the kids version: Ali B, Ilse DeLange and Marco Borsato, were announced as coaches for the senior version, but Ali B eventually didn't become a coach for the show. On 7 May 2018 it was announced in a radio show that Angela Groothuizen, who previously also appeared as a coach in The Voice of Holland and The Voice Kids, would become the third coach. A month later, it was revealed that Gerard Joling and Gordon Heuckeroth would be joining the show as a duo coach and would sit in a double chair under the name Geer & Goor. On 25 May 2019 it was announced that singer Frans Bauer would become a new coach for the second season. On 14 June 2019 it was confirmed on the show's Facebook page that Angela Groothuizen, Ilse DeLange and Marco Borsato would all return on the second season.

On 6 June 2020 it was announced that Groothuizen, DeLange and Bauer would return on the third season as coaches. On 21 July 2020 it was announced that Gerard Joling would return on the third season replacing Borsato, but this time as a solo coach. In July 2021, it was announced that all coaches and hosts from the previously season would return for the fourth series.

Coaches gallery

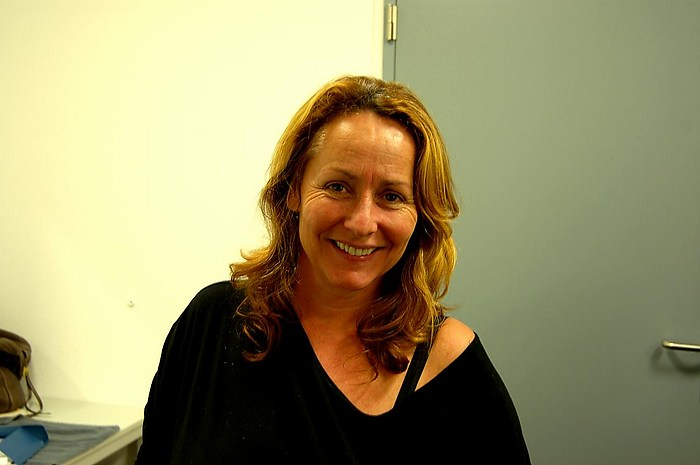
Angela Groothuizen (2018–2021)

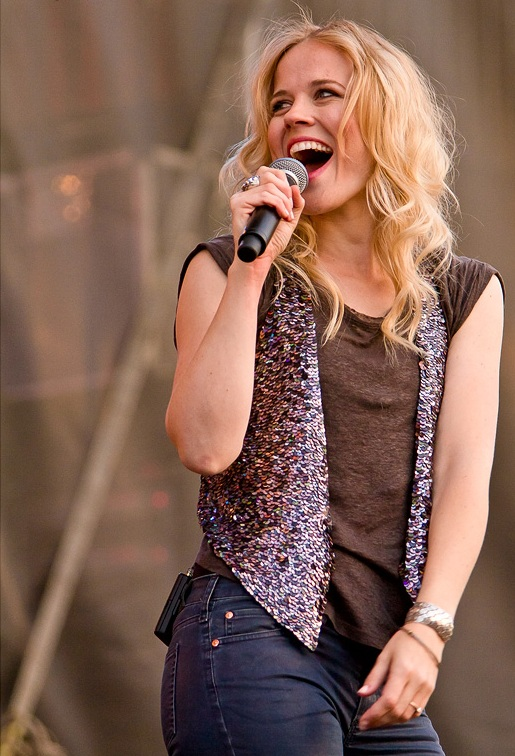
Ilse DeLange (2018–2021)

Marco Borsato (2018–2019)

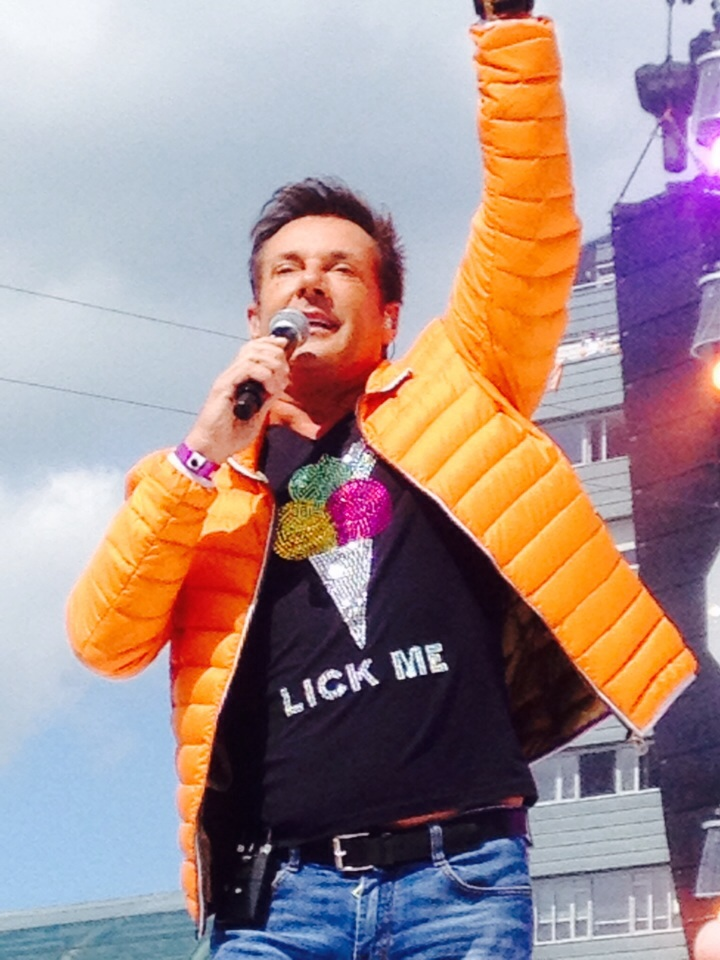
Gerard Joling (duo, 2018; solo, 2020–2021)

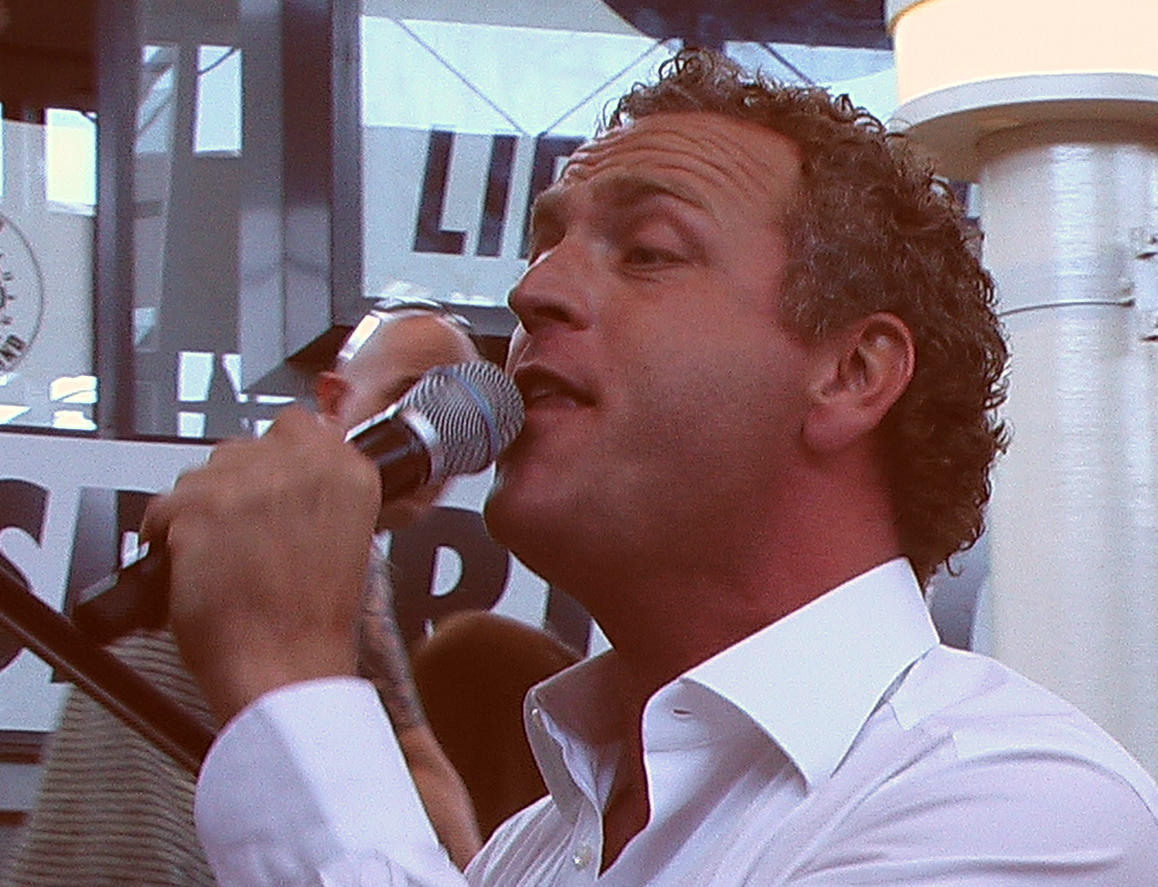
Gordon Heuckeroth (duo, 2018)

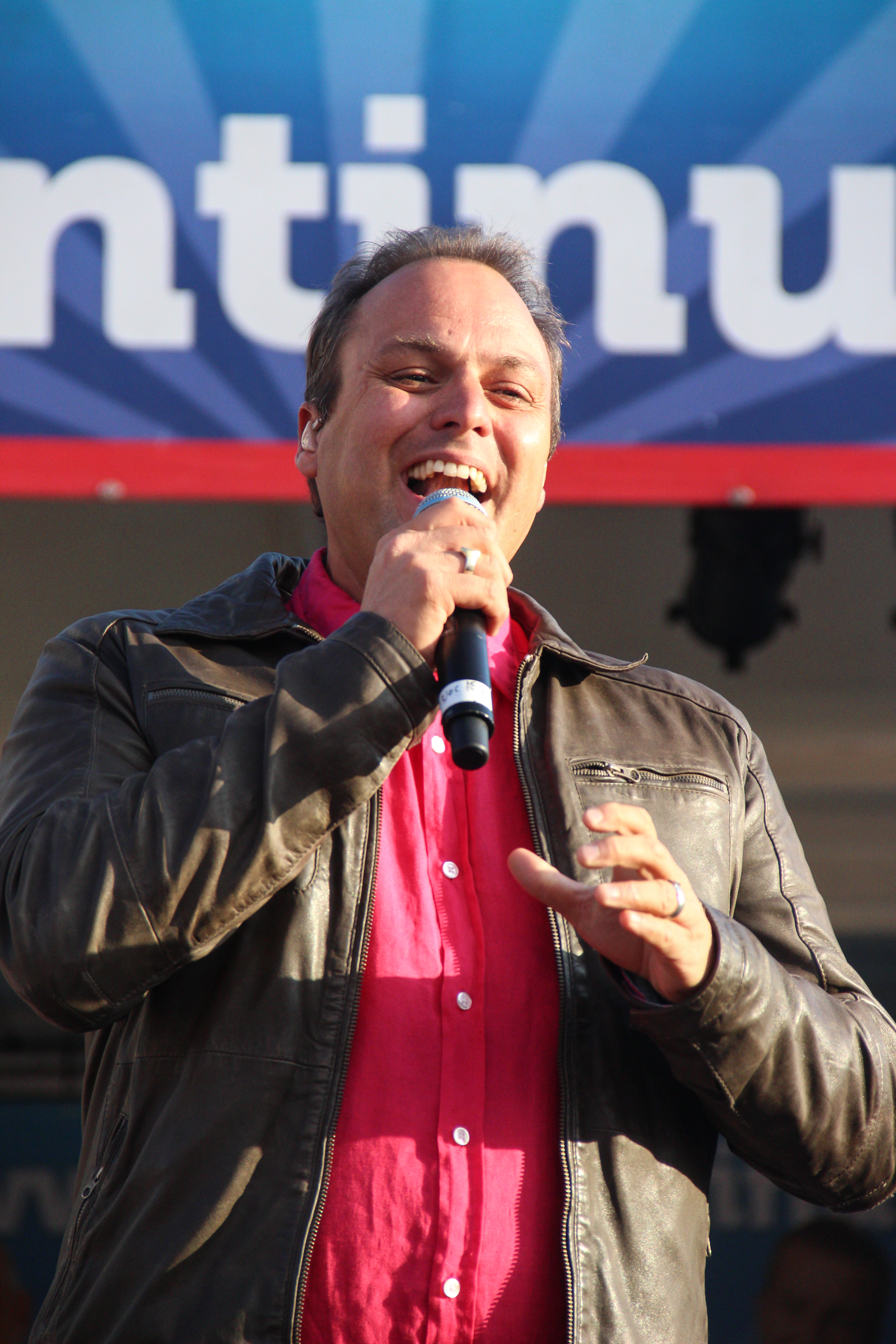
Frans Bauer (2019–2021)

==== Timeline of coaches ====
Coaches	Seasons			
Coaches	1	2	3	4
Ilse DeLange				
Angela Groothuizen				
Marco Borsato				
Gerard Joling				
Gordon Heuckeroth				
Frans Bauer				

=== Line-up of Coaches ===
Coaches' line-up by chairs order
Season	Year	Coaches			
Season	Year	1	2	3	4
1	2018	Angela	Geer & Goor	Ilse	Marco
2	2019	Angela	Frans	Ilse	Marco
3	2020	Angela	Frans	Ilse	Gerard
4	2021	Angela	Frans	Ilse	Gerard

=== Hosts ===
Martijn Krabbé and Wendy van Dijk, who both host the adult and the kids version, also became hosts for The Voice Senior. In March 2019 it was announced that Van Dijk was going to stop as a presenter because she switched from television channel RTL 4 to SBS6, and would be replaced by Lieke van Lexmond.

Hosts gallery

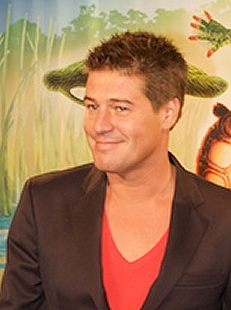
Martijn Krabbé (2018–2021)

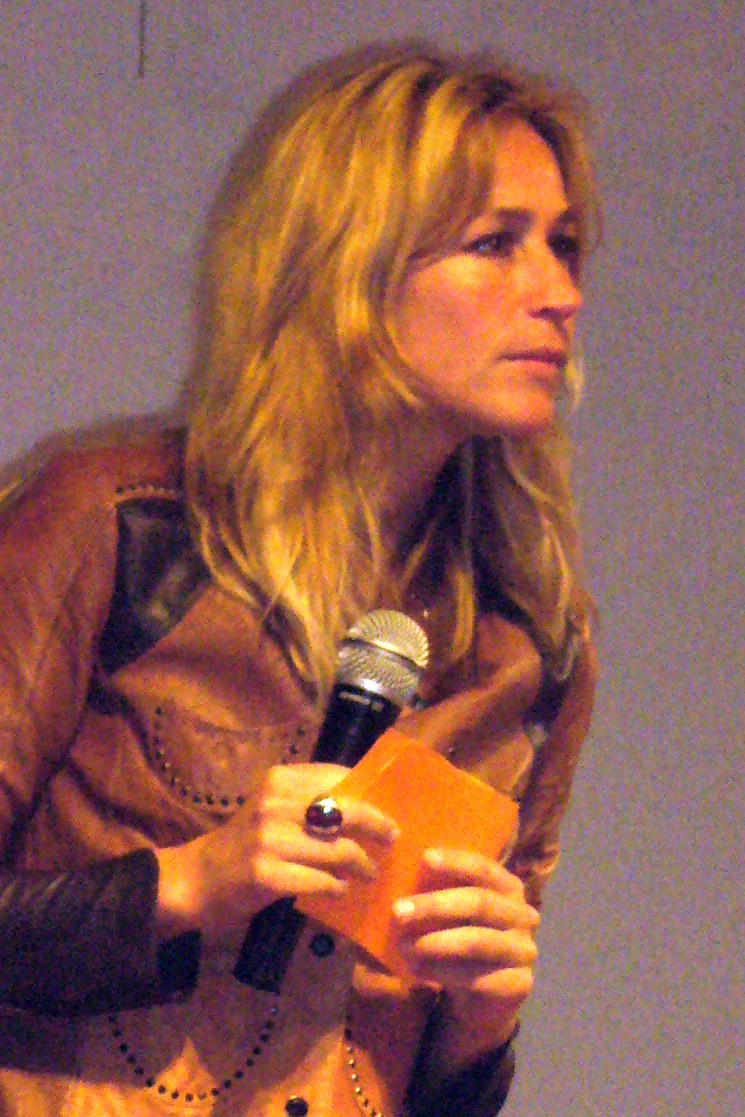
Wendy van Dijk (2018)

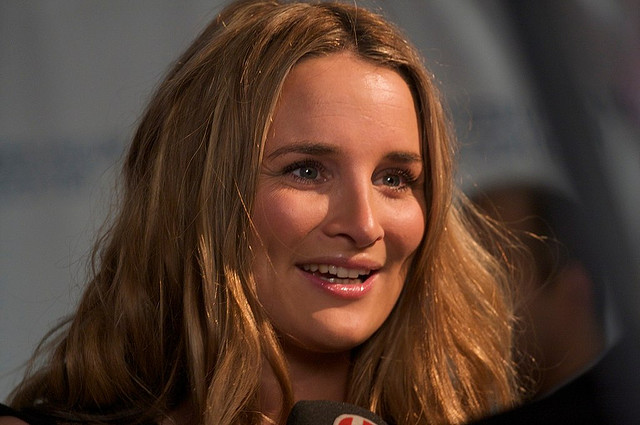
Lieke van Lexmond (2019–2021)

==== Timeline of hosts ====
Hosts	Seasons			
Hosts	1	2	3	4
Martijn Krabbé				
Wendy van Dijk				
Lieke van Lexmond				

== Series overview ==
Warning: the following table presents a significant amount of different colors.

Teams color key
Artist from Team Gerard & Gordon	Artist from Team Marco
Artist from Team Angela	Artist from Team Frans
Artist from Team Ilse	Artist from Team Gerard

Season	Aired	Winner	Other finalists			Winning coach	Hosts
1	2018	Jimi Bellmartin†	Marianne Noble	Annet Hesterman	Georges Lotze	Gerard & Gordon	Martijn Krabbé, Wendy van Dijk
2	2019	Ruud Hermans	Eddie Taylor	IJsbrand van Belleghem	Steve Yocum	Ilse DeLange	Martijn Krabbé, Lieke van Lexmond
3	2020	Henny Thijssen	Rosy Pereira	Evert Braumuller	Hein Migchelbrink	Frans Bauer	Martijn Krabbé, Lieke van Lexmond
4	2021	Phil Bee	Tollak Ollestad	Leoni Jansen	Hans Baltus	Frans Bauer	Martijn Krabbé, Lieke van Lexmond

== International franchises ==
Since its creation in 2017, it was announced that the format had been sold to Belgium and the Belgian-Flemish version will be airing in the autumn of 2018. Up to now, many countries have acquired the right to produce their own version of The Voice Senior:

- (Russia) Channel One — The Russian version of the show, Голос 60+ began airing on 14 September 2018, with Leonid Agutin, Pelageya, Lev Leshchenko and Valery Meladze as coaches.
- (Germany) Sat.1 — The German version of the show began airing on 23 December 2018, with Mark Forster, Yvonne Catterfeld, Sascha Schmitz and The BossHoss as coaches. However, this show was cancelled after airing for two seasons.
- vtm — The Flemish part of Belgium have announced their version of The Voice Senior with Walter Grootaers, Dana Winner, Natalia Druyts and Helmut Lotti as coaches.
- (Spain) Atresmedia — After Antena 3 acquired the show, they announced that La Voz Senior would be produced in 2019. David Bisbal, Pablo López, Antonio Orozco and Paulina Rubio were confirmed as coaches.
- PPTV — APJ & Co, licensee in Thailand has announced audition of The Voice Senior Thailand that would be on air in 2019. Stamp Apiwat, Charat Fuang-arom, Parn Thanaporn and Kong Saharat were confirmed as coaches.
- (Mexico) TV Azteca — After TV Azteca acquired the broadcasting rights of La Voz it was announced that it would make its own version of The Voice Senior entitled La Voz Senior. Lupillo Rivera, Ricardo Montaner, Yahir and Belinda were announced as coaches of the senior version.
- (Lithuania) LNK — The senior edition of the Lithuanian version of the show was announced to be in production in early 2019, with coaches Justinas Jarutis, Inga Jankauskaitė, Monika Marija and Mantas Jankavičius.
- TVP2 — The Polish version of the show, The Voice Senior Poland, was announced in June 2019. Marek Piekarczyk, Urszula Dudziak, Alicja Majewska and Andrzej Piaseczny were announced as coaches of the senior version.
- (Arab League) MBC1 — The network producing the Arabic version of the show has announced their plan of debuting the senior edition in June 2019.
- (Italy) Rai 1 - The Italian version of The Voice Senior was announced in summer of 2020 the first edition of this format, with Antonella Clerici as presenter. The coaches were Gigi d'Alessio, Loredana Bertè, Clementino and the duo Al Bano and with his daughter Yasmine Carrisi.
- (Brazil) TV Globo — The Brazilian version of the show, The voice + began airing on 17 January 2021, with Ludmilla, Daniel, Claudia Leitte and Mumuzinho as coaches.
- (Peru) Latina Television – The Peruvian version La Voz Senior was announced in early 2021 and premiered on 27 August 2021, with Eva Ayllón, Daniela Darcourt, Tony Succar and the duo Pimpinela as coaches.
- (Colombia) Caracol Televisión – The Colombian version of the show premiered on 20 September 2021. Andrés Cepeda, Natalia Jiménez and Jesus Navarro were announced as coaches.
- (Finland) Nelonen – The Finnish version of the show premiered on 20 May 2022. With the coaches Michael Monroe, Tarja Turunen and Ressu Redford.
