= La Voz Senior (Mexican TV series) =

Mexican reality talent show

- Genre: Reality competition
- Created by: John de Mol
- Directed by: Acunmedya; José Luis Romero
- Presented by: Jimena Pérez; Eddy Vilard
- Judges: Lupillo Rivera; Belinda; Yahir; Ricardo Montaner; María José
- Narrated by: Jimena Pérez; Eddy Vilard
- Country of origin: Mexico
- Original language: Spanish
- No. of seasons: 2
- No. of episodes: 16

Production
- Executive producer: José Luis Romero
- Production locations: Azteca Estudios; Mexico City
- Camera setup: Multi-camera
- Running time: 180 minutes
- Production companies: Talpa Media (2019); TV Azteca; Acunmeyda; ITV Studios (2021

Original release
- Network: Azteca Uno
- Release: July 15, 2019 – May 31, 2021

Related
- La Voz; La Voz Kids

La Voz Senior (Spanish for The Voice Senior) is a Mexican reality talent show that premiered on July 15, 2019 on Azteca Uno. It is based on and part of The Voice franchise created by television producer John de Mol.

When TV Azteca acquired the format of La Voz in 2019 from Televisa, they announced they would also produce La Voz Senior, for elders over 55.

== Format ==
The show consists of three phases: Blind audition, Knockout phase, and Finale. Four judges/coaches, all noteworthy recording artists, choose teams of contestants through a blind audition process (6 members in season 1 and 12 members in season 2 y 3).

=== First Phase – The Blind Auditions ===
Each judge has the length of the auditioner's performance (about one minute) to decide if he or she wants that singer on his or her team; if two or more judges want the same singer (as happens frequently), the singer has the final choice of coach. The third season introduced the block button, where a coach could prevent another coach from getting a contestant on their team.

=== Second Phase – The Knockouts ===
In this phase two artists from the same team sing an individual song and their coach chooses the winner. In the Senior format, no steals are available.

=== Third Phase – The Finale ===
In the Finale, each artist competes to receive their coach’s and public’s vote. The artist with the highest votes from each team advances to the next round. In the last round, the highest voted artist wins the title as their country’s The Voice 'Senior', along with their coach.

== Coaches and hosts ==
The first season features Ricardo Montaner, Belinda, Yahir and Lupillo Rivera as coaches, and Jimena Pérez as host, same as season eight of the adult version. Filming for the second season began in September 2020, revealing Belinda, Montaner, Yahir returning as coaches, joined by María José, replacing Rivera. Pérez also was replaced in the second season by Eddy Vilard.

=== Coaches ===
Coach	Seasons	
Coach	1	2
Ricardo Montaner		
Yahir		
Belinda		
Lupillo Rivera		
Maria José		

=== Coaches' gallery ===
Coaches

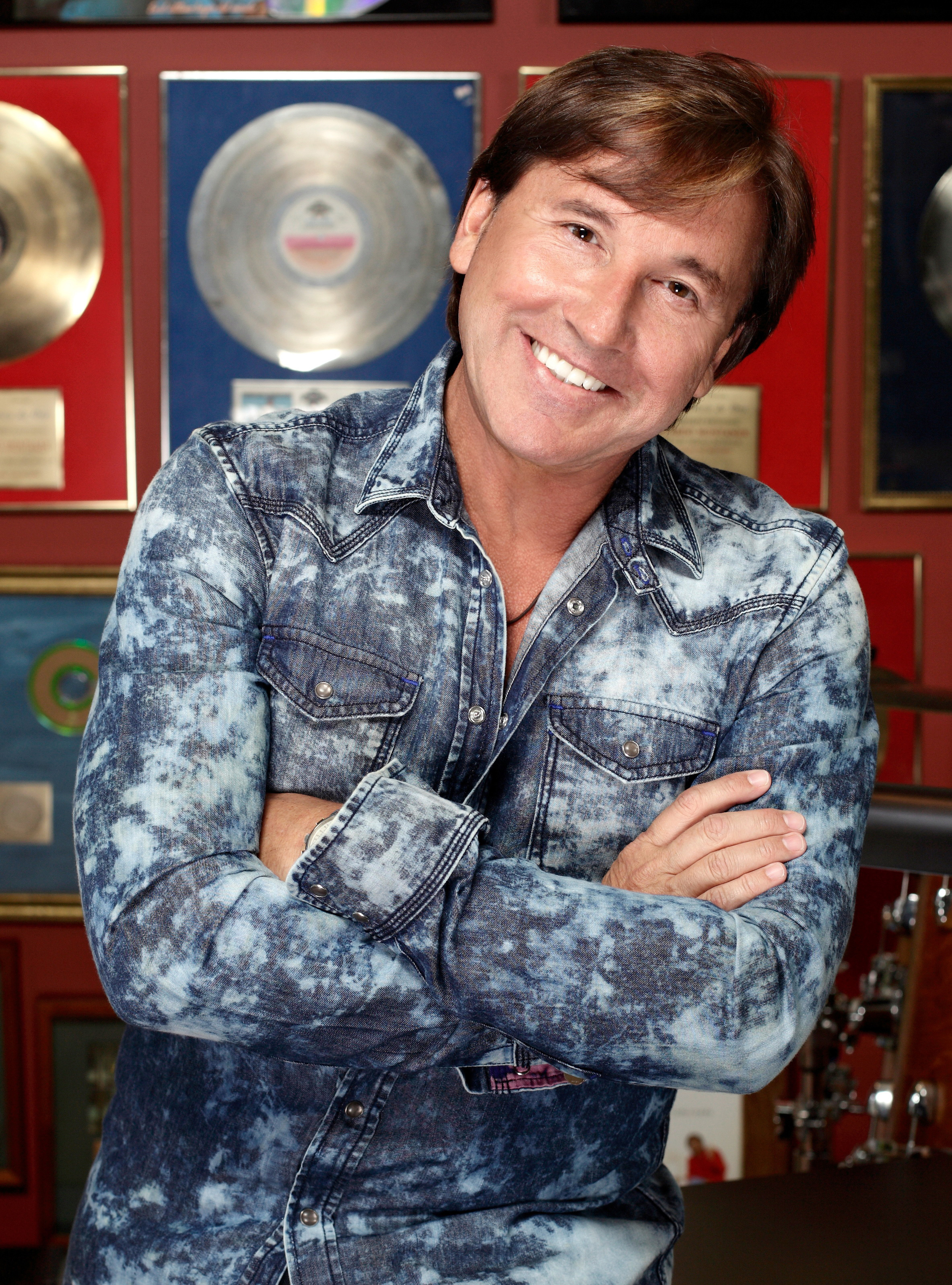
Ricardo Montaner (2019, 2021)

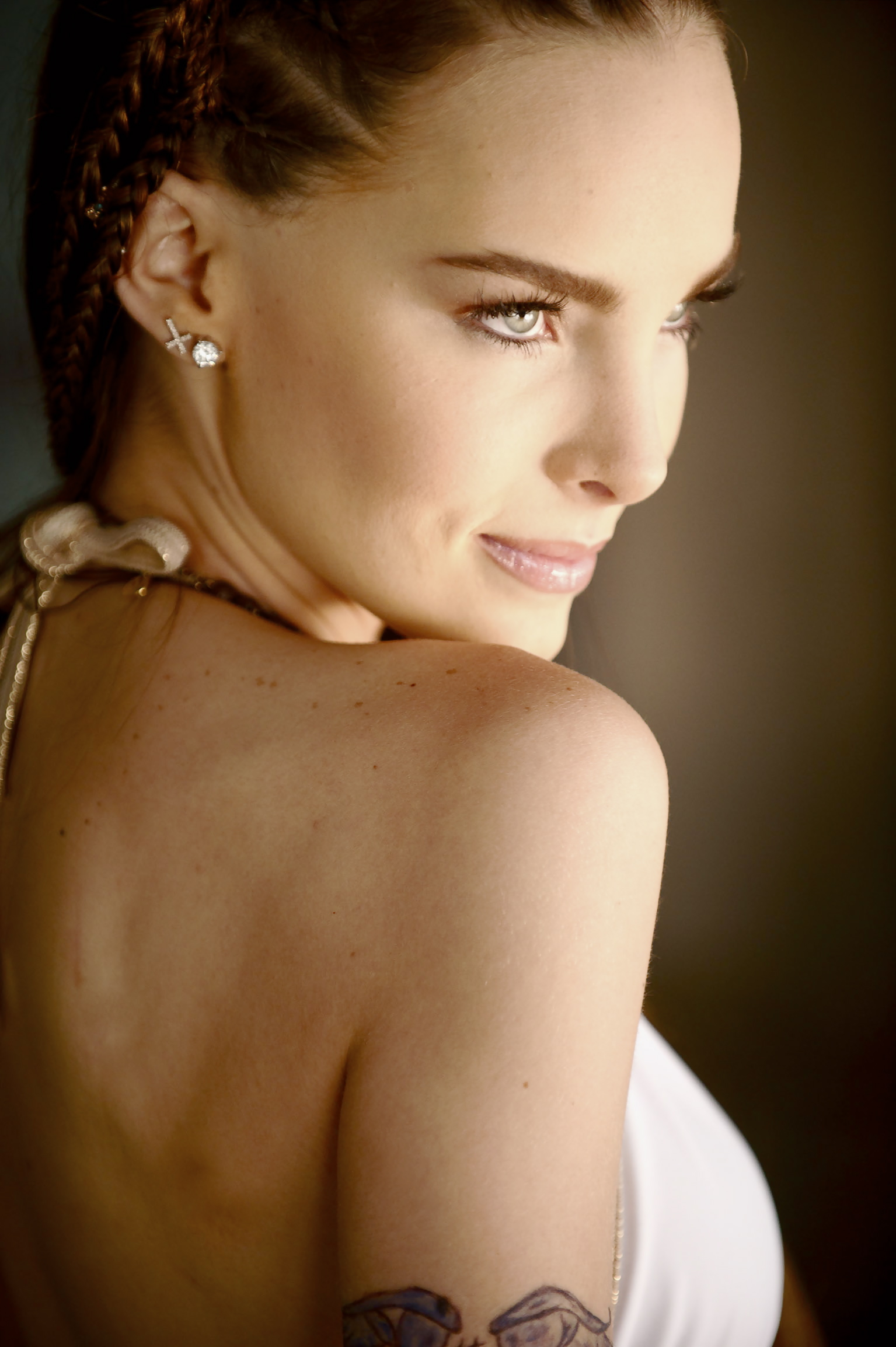
Belinda (2019, 2021)

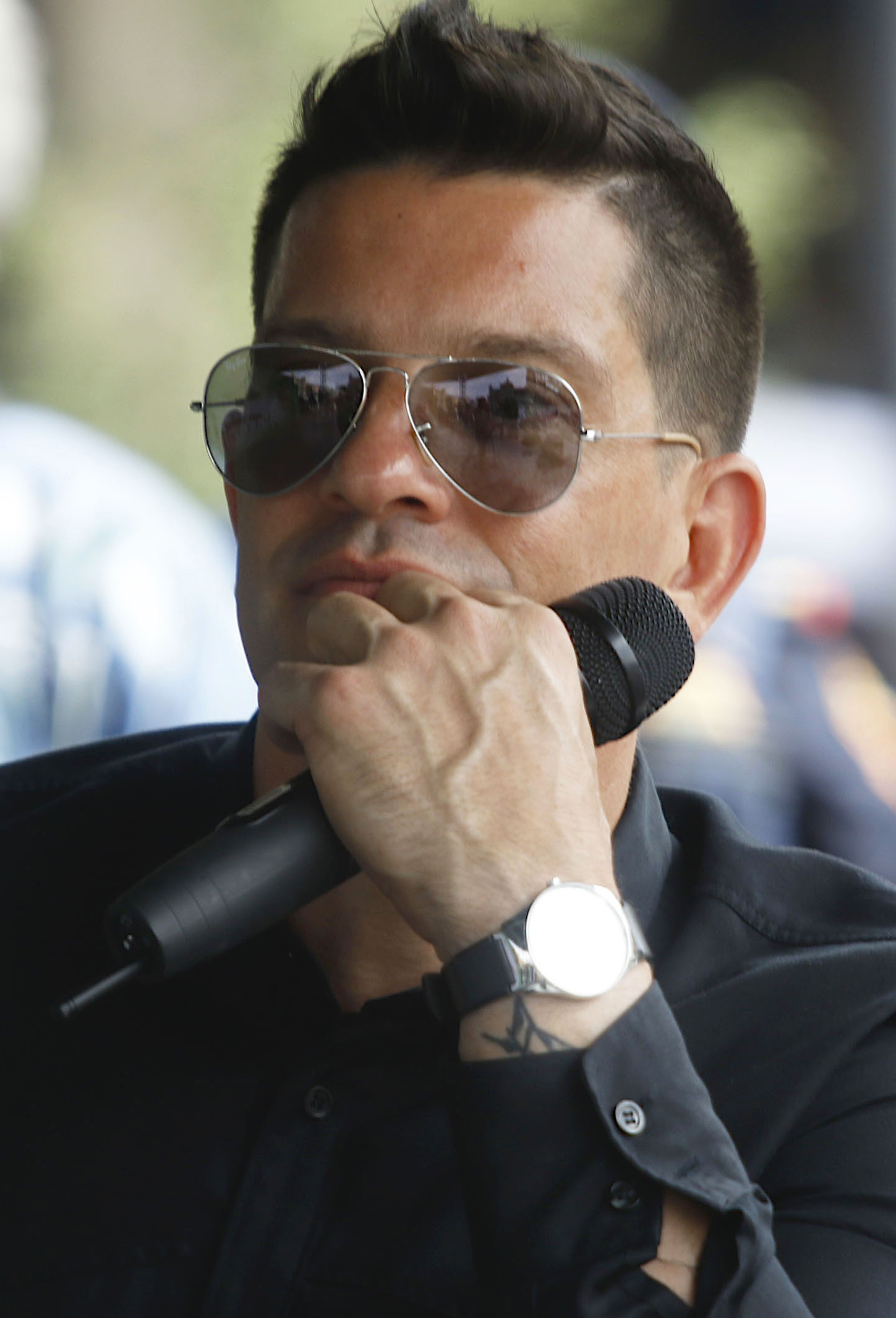
Yahir (2019, 2021)

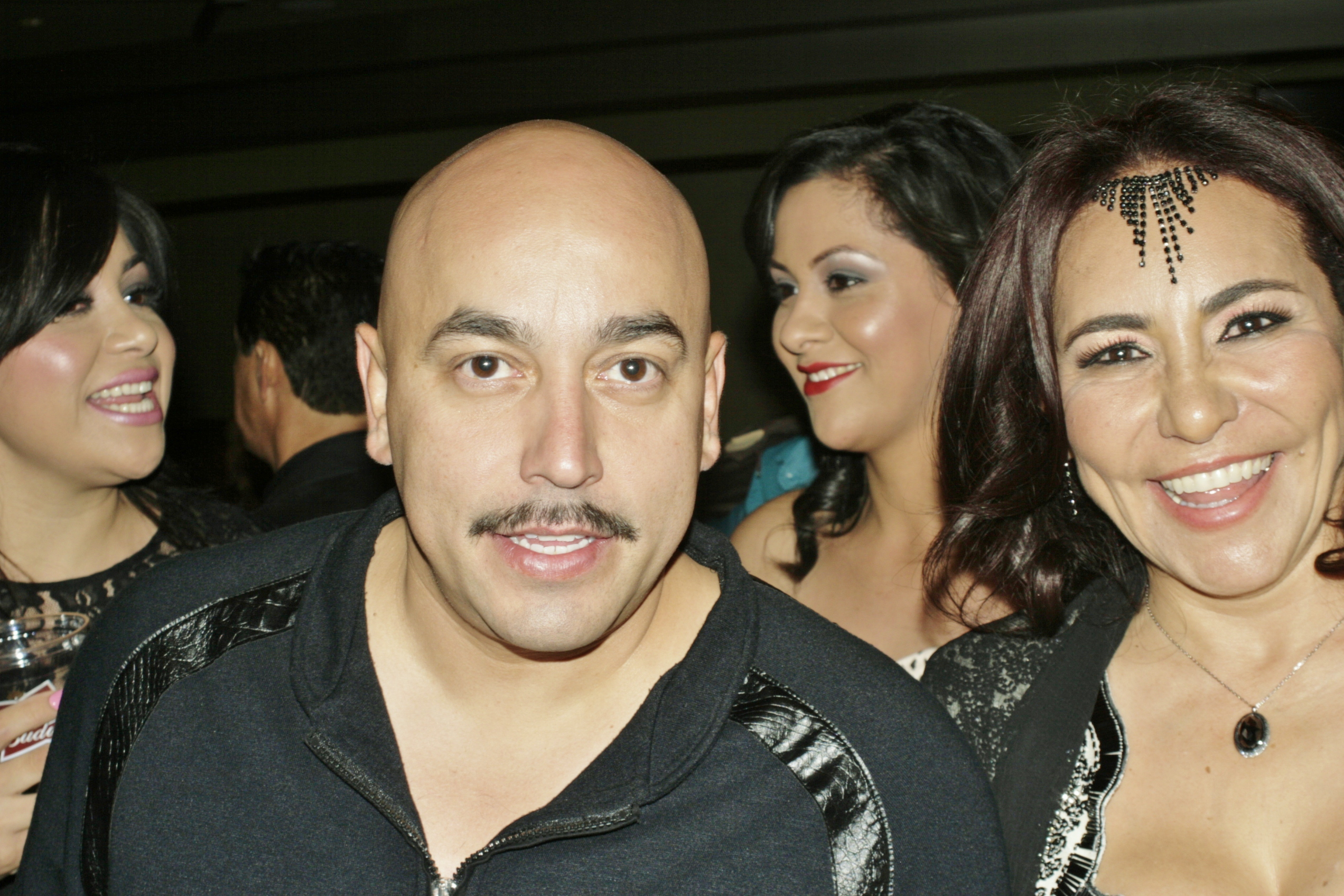
Lupillo Rivera (2019)

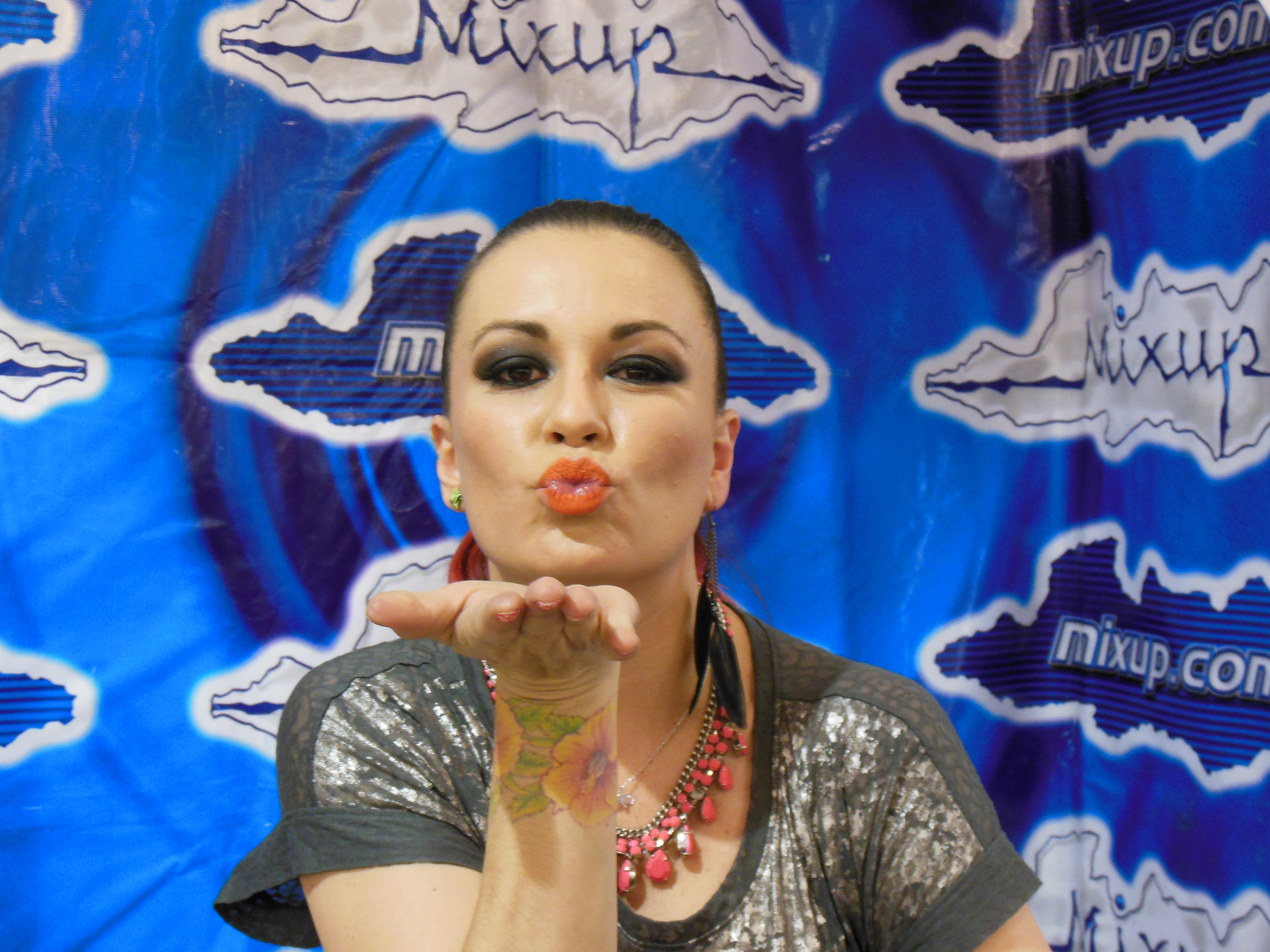
María José (2021)

== Coaches' teams ==
– Winning coach/contestant
– Runner-up coach/contestant
– Third place coach/contestant
– Fourth place coach/contestant

Season	Coaches			
1	Lupillo Rivera	Belinda	Yahir	Ricardo Montaner
1	Jorge Orozco; Robertha; Yamel Kuri	Genaro Palacios; Maggie Mei; Durcy Denys	Cuca Tena; Sergio Jiménez; Mario Sanabria	Salvador Rivera; Xavier Gibler; Noel Rodriguez
2	Ricardo Montaner	Belinda	María José	Yahir
2	Omar Alexander; Manolo; Juan Manuel; Rossy Guizar	Baby Bátiz; Enrique Avilés; Viola Dorantes; Raúl Álvarez	Rossy Rodríguez; Hilda Gil; Lucero Campos; Armando Valdéz	Mr. Clayton; La Istmeña; Jimmy; Freddy Persa

== Series overview ==
La Voz Senior series overview
Season	Aired	Winner	Finalists			Winning coach	Host	Coaches (chairs' order)			
Season	Aired	Winner	Finalists			Winning coach	Host	1	2	3	4
1	2019	Salvador Rivera	Genaro Palacios	Cuca Tena	Jorge Orozco	Ricardo Montaner	Jimena Pérez	Lupillo	Belinda	Yahir	Ricardo
2	2021	Omar Alexander	Baby Bátiz	Rossy Rodríguez	Mr. Clayton	Ricardo Montaner	Eddy Vilard	Ricardo	Belinda	María José	Yahir

=== Season 1 ===
Name	Age	Description	Musical style
Ricardo Montaner	61 years old	International Star	Latin pop, Balada romántica
Belinda	29 years old	International Artist	Latin pop, pop rock, dance-pop, electropop
Yahir	40 years old	National Artist	Latin pop, Balada romántica
Lupillo Rivera	47 years old	Regional Artist	Norteño, Ranchera, Banda sinaloense, Mariachi

=== Season 2 ===
Name	Age	Description	Musical style
Ricardo Montaner	63 years old	International Star	Latin pop, Balada romántica
Belinda	31 years old	International Artist	Latin pop, pop rock, dance-pop, electropop
María José	45 years old	International Artist	Latin pop, pop rock, Rock, Balada romántica, soul
Yahir	42 years old	National Artist	Latin pop, Balada romántica
