= La Voz Senior (Mexican TV series) season 1 =

Television season

La Voz Senior
- Season 1
- Hosted by: Jimena Pérez
- Coaches: Lupillo Rivera; Belinda; Yahir; Ricardo Montaner
- Winner: Salvador Rivera
- Winning coach: Ricardo Montaner
- Runner-up: Genaro Palacios

Release
- Original network: Azteca Uno
- Original release: July 15 – July 30, 2019

Season chronology
- Next → Season 2

The first season of La Voz Senior premiered on July 15, 2019, on Azteca Uno. Ricardo Montaner, Yahir, Belinda and Lupillo Rivera served as the coaches for this season, just like in the eighth season of La Voz. Jimena Pérez hosted the show.

When TV Azteca acquired rights to La Voz from Televisa, they announced their plan to produce a senior version specifically for individuals aged 60 and over. Mexico became the first country in Latin America to produce the senior version of the show.

== Coaches ==
La Voz season 1 coaches

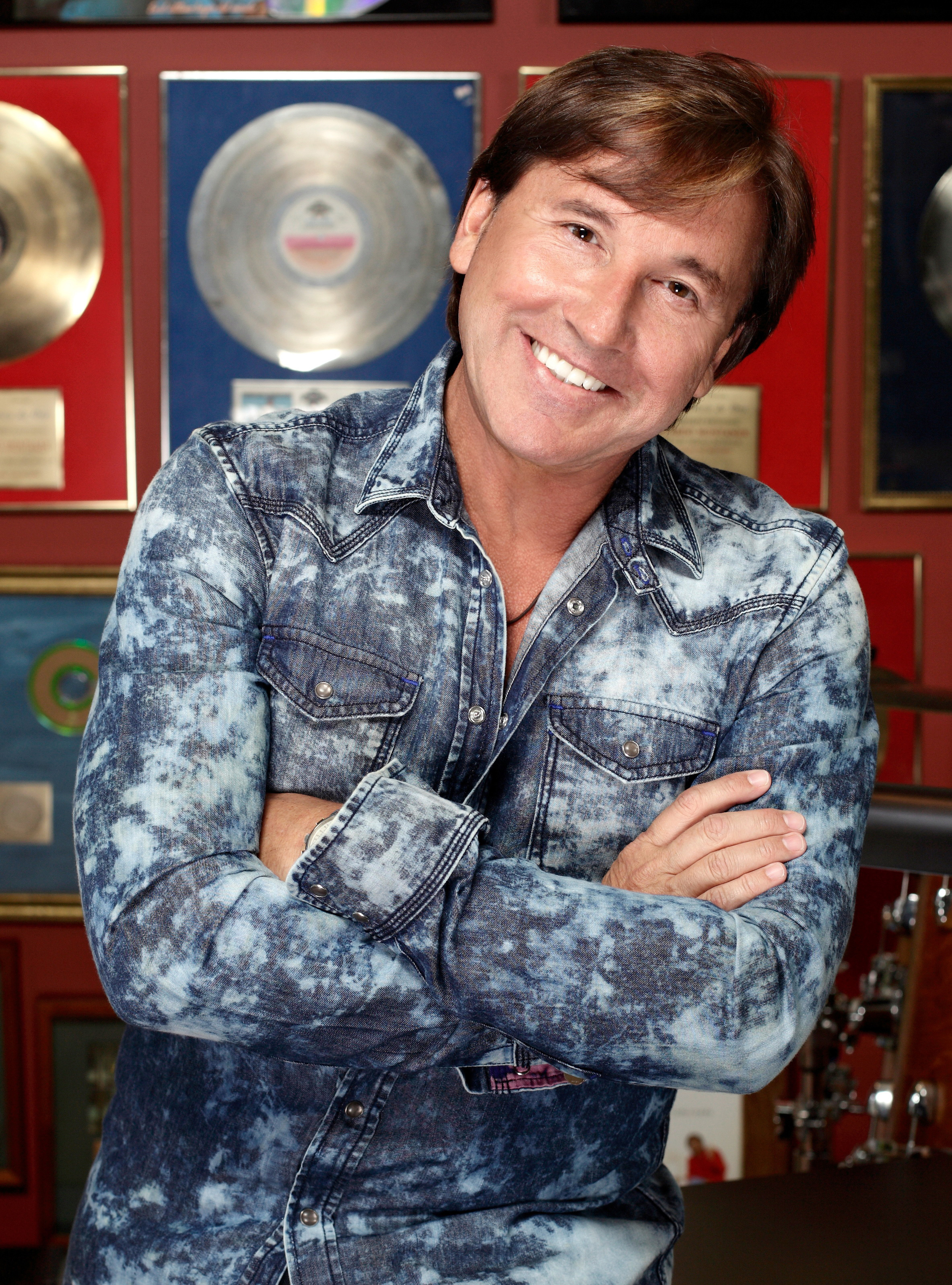
Ricardo Montaner

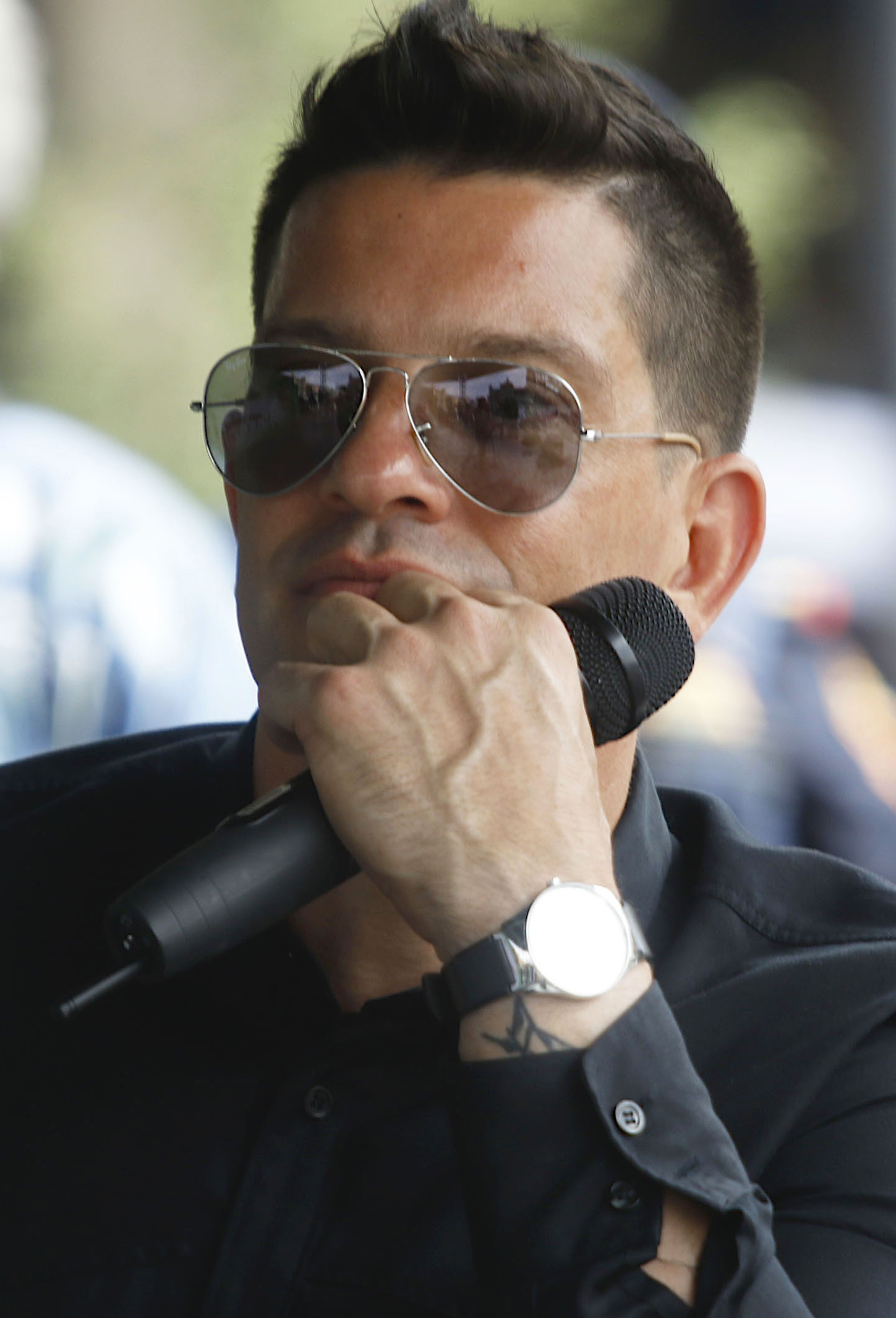
Yahir

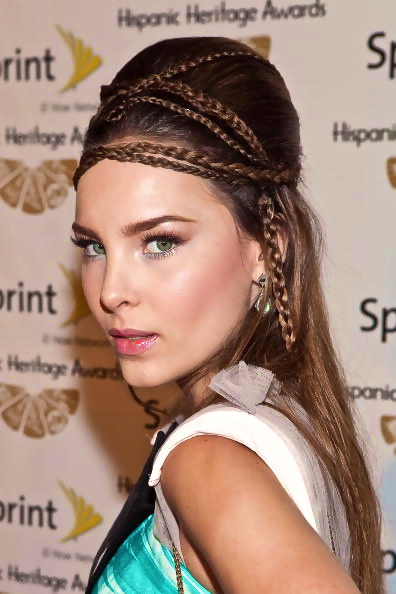
Belinda

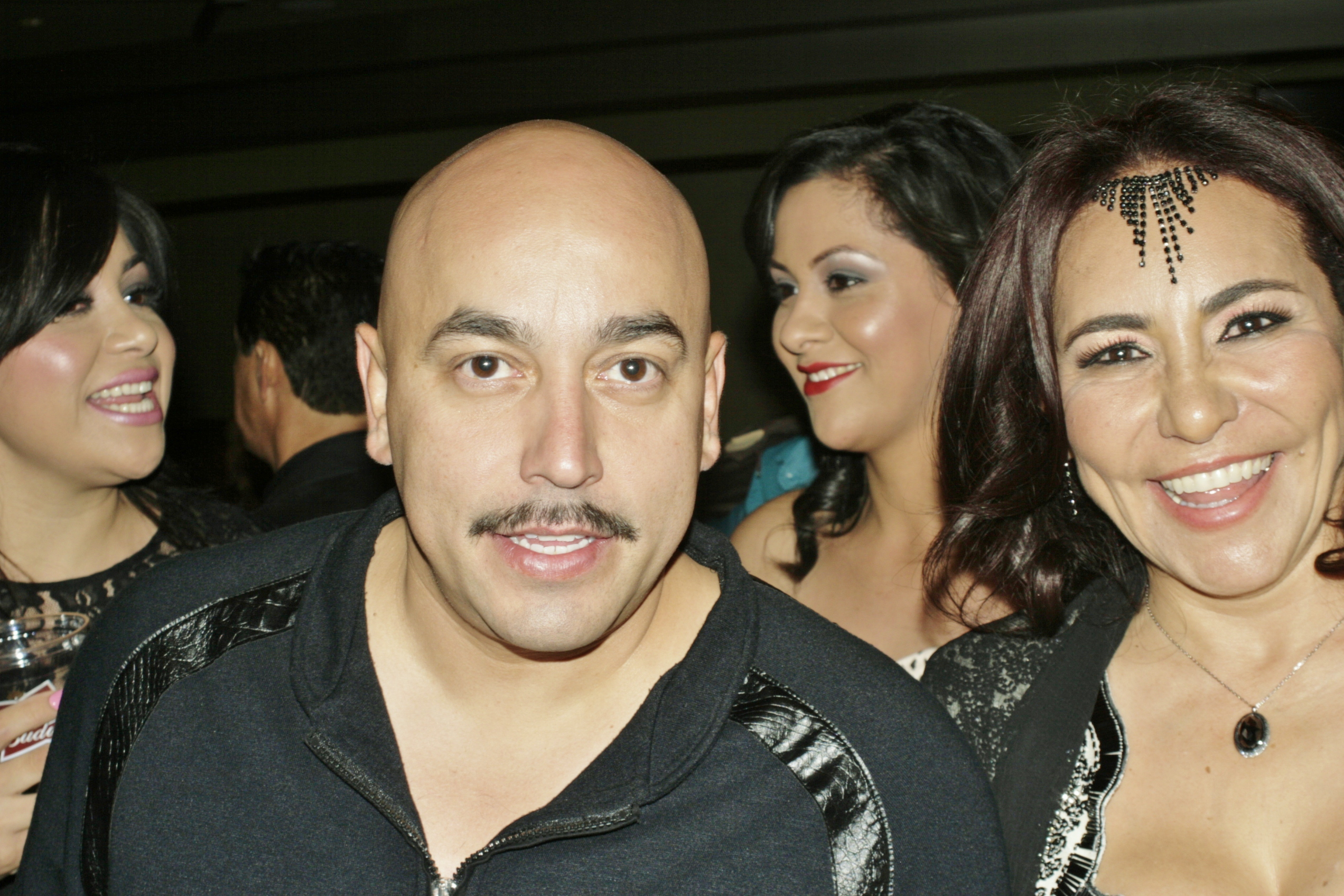
Lupillo Rivera

== Teams ==
Color key

- Winner
- Runner-up
- Third place
- Fourth place
- Eliminated in the Finale
- Eliminated in the Knockouts

Coaches	Top 24 artists					
Lupillo Rivera						
Lupillo Rivera	Jorge Orozco "Mr.Soul"	Robertha "La Voz de Amor"	Yamel Kuri	Alfredo Jiménez	Paco Rodríguez	Laura Estela Badillo
Belinda						
Belinda	Genaro Palacios	Maggie Mei	Durcy Denys	Marisol Harmony	Patty Ortiz	Mara Monteros
Yahir						
Yahir	Cuca Tena	Mario Sanabria	Sergio Jiménez	Michelet	Atala Chávez	Lety Grey
Ricardo Montaner						
Ricardo Montaner	Salvador Rivera	Noel Rodriguez	Xavier Gibler	Patricia Martín Sánchez	Guadalupe Divina	Ángeles Jiménez

== Blind Auditions ==
Color key
✔	Coach pressed "QUIERO TU VOZ" button
	Artist elected a coach's team
	Artist defaulted to a coach's team
	Artist eliminated with no coach pressing his or her “QUIERO TU VOZ” button

=== Episode 1 (July 15) ===
Order	Artist	Age	Hometown	Song	Coach's and artist's choices			
Order	Artist	Age	Hometown	Song	Lupillo	Belinda	Yahir	Ricardo
1	Patty Ortíz	59	Culiacán, Sinaloa	"Paloma Negra"	–	✔	✔	–
2	Linda Sánchez	78	Mexico City	"La Llorona"	–	–	–	–
3	Salvador Rivera	60	Mexico City	"Te quiero, te quiero"	✔	–	✔	✔
4	Jorge Orozco "Mr. Soul"	68	Mexico City	"Papa's Got a Brand New Bag"	✔	✔	✔	✔
5	Maria Troya	64	Puebla, Puebla	"O mio babbino caro"	–	–	–	–
6	Sergio Jiménez	66	Mexico City	"Como yo te ame"	✔	✔	✔	–
7	Genaro Palacios	70	Guadalajara, Jalisco	"Sweet Home Chicago"	✔	✔	✔	✔
8	Micaela Leal	60	La Paz, Baja California Sur	"Se va Muriendo mi Alma"	–	–	–	–
9	Robertha "La Voz del Amor"	–	Lima, Perú	Angelitos Negros"	✔	–	✔	–
10	Geronimo Aguilar	60	Mexico City	"Volcán"	–	–	–	–
11	Mara Monteros	70	Mexico City	"Garufa"	✔	✔	✔	–
12	Lupita Bustamante	55	Hermosillo, Mexico	Adiós Amor"	–	–	–	–

=== Episode 2 (July 16) ===
Order	Artist	Age	Hometown	Song	Coach's and artist's choices			
Order	Artist	Age	Hometown	Song	Lupillo	Belinda	Yahir	Ricardo
1	Guadalupe Divina	56	Mexico City	"Manías"	–	–	–	✔
2	Michelet	70	Mexico City	"Tengo Todo Excepto a Ti	✔	–	✔	–
3	Pedro Hernández	67	Telchac Pueblo, Yucatán	"Te He Prometido"	–	–	–	–
4	Durcy Denys	74	Veracruz, Veracruz	"Por Cobardia"	✔	✔	✔	✔
5	Jesús Reyes González	71	Lagos de Moreno, Jalisco	"Tristes Recuerdos"	–	–	–	–
6	Maggie Mei	72	Mexico City	"The House of the Rising Sun"	✔	✔	✔	✔
7	Xavier Gibler	60	San Miguel de Allende, Guanajuato	"Hoy Tengo Ganas de Ti"	✔	✔	✔	✔
8	Patricia Martín Sánchez	64	Mexico City	"La Vie en rose"	✔	✔	✔	✔
9	Gil Alvarez	60	Mexico City	"Buenos dias amor"	–	–	–	–
10	Laura Estella Badillo	55	Mexico City	"Insensible a ti"	✔	–	–	–
11	Manuel Reyes López	74	Campeche, Campeche	"Sabor a Nada"	–	–	–	–
12	Lety Grey	56	Mexico City	"Recuerdos"	–	–	✔	–

=== Episode 3 (July 22) ===
Order	Artist	Age	Hometown	Song	Coach's and artist's choices			
Order	Artist	Age	Hometown	Song	Lupillo	Belinda	Yahir	Ricardo
1	Atala Chávez	63	Ecatepec de Morelos, State of Mexico	"Odiame"	✔	✔	✔	–
2	Alfredo Jiménez	69	Queretaro, Queretaro	"Amaneci en tus Brazos"	✔	✔	✔	✔
3	Alejandro Rivera	62	Mexico City	"Usted Se Me Llevo la Vida"	–	–	–	–
4	Maria del Refugio "Cuca" Tena	70	Mexico City	"Sweet Nothin's"	✔	✔	✔	✔
5	Yamel Kuri	65	Mexico City	"Acariciame"	✔	–	–	–
6	Ángeles Jiménez	58	Queretaro, Queretaro	"Un Mundo Raro"	✔	–	–	✔
7	Marisol Harmony	58	Mexico City	"Con te partirò"	–	✔	✔	–
8	Noel Rodriguez	60	Cancun, Quintana Roo	"El Cantante"	✔	Team full	✔	✔
9	Paco Rodriguez	67	Mexico City	"Yo Que No Vivo Sin Ti"	✔	Team full	–	Team full
10	Tito Villalobos	60	Chihuahua, Chihuahua	"Granada"	Team full	Team full	–	Team full
11	Pathy Meade	70	Mexico City	"Yo te pido amor"	Team full	Team full	–	Team full
12	Mario Sanabria	72	Mexico City	"Just the Way You Are"	Team full	Team full	✔	Team full

== Knockouts ==
Color key
Artist won the Knockout and advanced to the Final
Artist lost the Knockout and was eliminated

Episode	Coach	Order	Song	Artists		Song
Episode	Coach	Order	Song	Winner	Loser	Song
Episode 4 (Tuesday, July 23, 2019)	Lupillo	1	"Stand by Me"	Jorge Orozco "Mr. Soul"	Laura Estela Badillo	"Casi Perfecto"
Episode 4 (Tuesday, July 23, 2019)	Ricardo	2	"I've Got You Under My Skin"	Xavier Gibler	Patricia Martín Sánchez	"Te amaré"
Episode 4 (Tuesday, July 23, 2019)	Belinda	3	"She Caught the Katy"	Genaro Palacios	Mara Monteros	"La gata bajo la lluvia"
Episode 4 (Tuesday, July 23, 2019)	Lupillo	4	"Summertime"	Robertha "La voz del Amor"	Alfredo Jiménez	"La venia bendita"
Episode 4 (Tuesday, July 23, 2019)	Belinda	5	"ADO"	Maggie Mei	Patty Ortíz	"Que nadie sepa mi sufrir"
Episode 4 (Tuesday, July 23, 2019)	Yahir	6	"Me acordaré de ti"	Sergio Jiménez	Atala Chavéz	"Pídeme"
Episode 5 (Monday, July 29, 2019)	Ricardo	1	"Unforgettable"	Noel Rodriguez	Guadalupe Divina	"Cielo Rojo"
Episode 5 (Monday, July 29, 2019)	Yahir	2	"Sway"	Mario Sanabria	Michelet	"Un nuevo Amor"
Episode 5 (Monday, July 29, 2019)	Belinda	3	"No soy el aire"	Durcy Denys	Marisol Harmony	"Amar y Querer"
Episode 5 (Monday, July 29, 2019)	Lupillo	4	"Y volveré"	Yamel Kuri	Paco Rodríguez	"Perfume de Gardenias"
Episode 5 (Monday, July 29, 2019)	Ricardo	5	"Si me tenías"	Salvador Rivera	Ángeles Jiménez	"Algo contigo"
Episode 5 (Monday, July 29, 2019)	Yahir	6	"Route 66"	Cuca Tena	Lety Grey	"Mi Buen Amor"

== The Final ==
The Final Episode aired on Tuesday, July 30. In the first round all artists performed and, in the end, each coach picked one artist to advance to the second round. In this one, the four remaining artists performed twice (one new song and blind audition song). At the end of the night, the first ever winner of La Voz Senior México was announced.

Color key
Artist was chosen by coach to advance to the Second Round
Artist was not chosen and was eliminated

First Round
Order	Coach	Artist	Song	Result
1	Belinda	Maggie Mei	"Chica Alborotada"	Eliminated
2	Yahir	Sergio Jiménez	"Llorando por dentro"	Eliminated
3	Lupillo Rivera	Jorge Orozco Sánchez "Mr. Soul"	"I Got You (I Feel Good)"	Advanced
4	Ricardo Montaner	Xavier Gibler	"No"	Eliminated
5	Belinda	Durcy Denys	"Quiero Amanecer con Alguien"	Eliminated
6	Yahir	Mario Sanabria	"Tus ojos"	Eliminated
7	Lupillo Rivera	Yamel Kuri	"El espejo"	Eliminated
8	Ricardo Montaner	Noel Rodriguez	"Contigo en la Distancia"	Eliminated
9	Belinda	Genaro Palacios	"When the Saints Go Marching In"	Advanced
10	Yahir	Cuca Tena	"Ya no"	Advanced
11	Lupillo Rivera	Robertha "La voz del Amor"	"Amor no llores"	Eliminated
12	Ricardo Montaner	Salvador Rivera	"No lo beses"	Advanced

Color key
Winner
Runner-up
Third place
Fourth place

Second round
Coach	Artist	Order	Song	Order	Song	Result
Belinda	Genaro Palacios	1	"Tequila Charlie's"	5	"Sweet Home Chicago"	Runner-up
Yahir	Cuca Tena	2	"Eddy Eddy"	6	"Sweet Nothin's"	Third Place
Lupillo Rivera	Jorge Orozco "Mr. Soul"	3	"You'll Never Find Another Love like Mine"	7	"Papa's Got a Brand New Bag"	Fourth Place
Ricardo Montaner	Salvador Rivera	4	"Aunque ahora estés con él"	8	"Te quiero, Te quiero"	Winner

== Ratings ==
Show	Episode	Air date	Timeslot (CT)	Viewers (millions)
1	"Blind Auditions, Part 1"	July 15, 2020	Monday 7:30 p.m.	1.6
2	"Blind Auditions, Part 2"	July 16, 2020	Tuesday 7:30 p.m.	1.6
3	"Blind Auditions, Part 3"	July 22, 2020	Monday 7:30 p.m.	1.5
4	"The Knockouts, Part 1"	July 23, 2020	Tuesday 7:30 p.m.	1.4
5	"The Knockouts, Part 2"	July 29, 2020	Monday 7:30 p.m.	1.5
6	"Finale"	July 30, 2020	Tuesday 7:30 p.m.	1.5
