= Wilma Landkroon =

Dutch pop singer (born 1957)

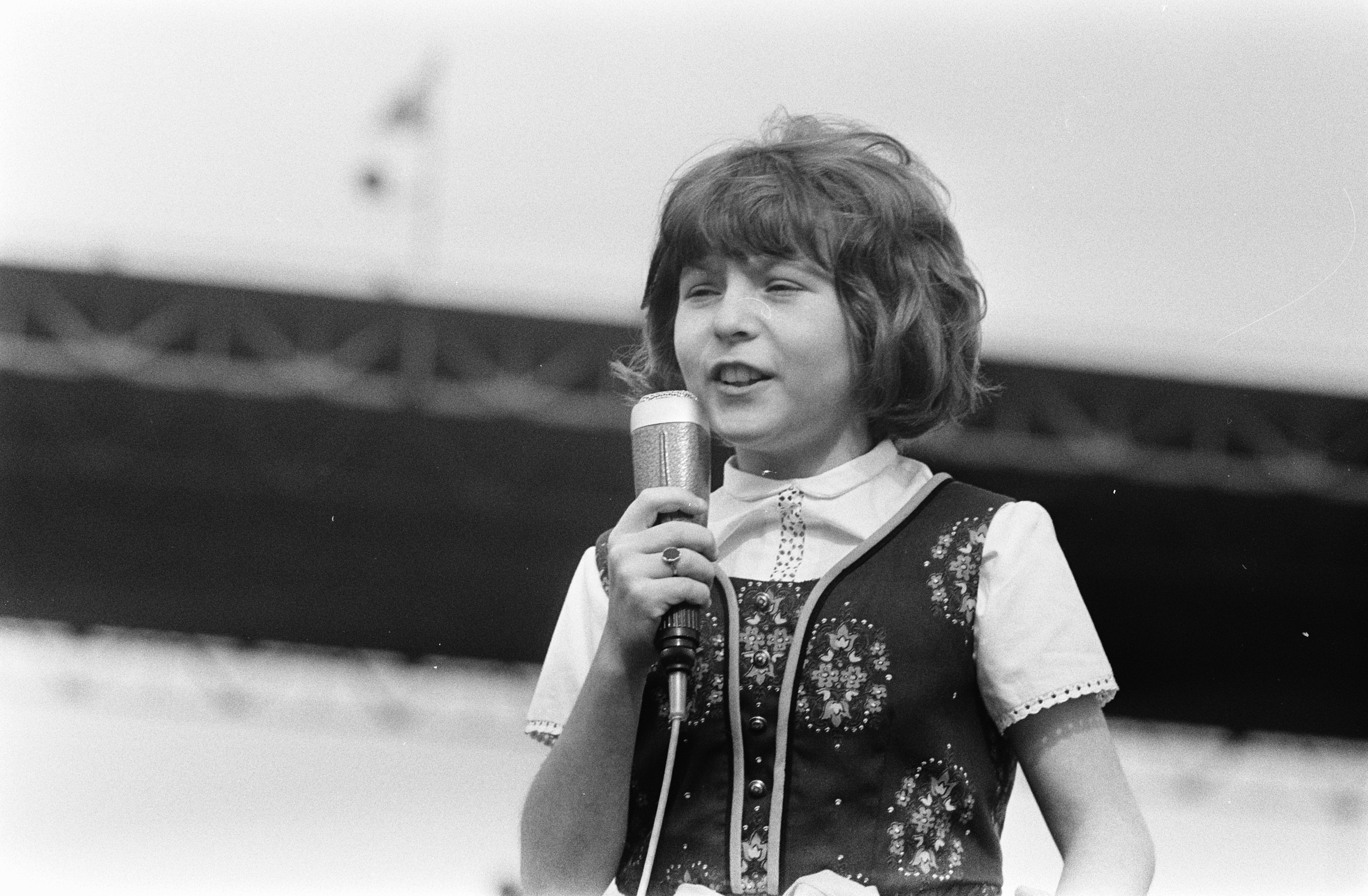
- Landkroon performing in 1969

Background information
- Born: 28 April 1957 (age 69); Enschede, Netherlands
- Genres: Pop
- Occupation: Singer
- Instrument: Vocals
- Years active: 1968–present

Wilma Landkroon (born 28 April 1957, Enschede) is a Dutch pop singer. At eleven years old, her first top chart success in the Netherlands and Germany was in 1968 the song "Heintje, bau ein Schloss für mich".

== Career ==
Her biggest hit was the 1968 song Heintje, "Heintje bau ein Schloss für mich" (Heintje, build a castle for me), which was very popular in the Netherlands and Germany. The song was her answer to the song "Ich Bau Dir Ein Schloss" (I am building a castle for you) by Heintje, another contemporary child singing star. She was awarded a golden record after the sale of 100,000 copies of her single. She received another golden record for the song "Zou het erg zijn lieve opa" which she sang along with Pierre Kartner. Eventually, she was awarded four golden records in all. Between 1968 and 1972, she had 8 hits in the top 40. However, an attempt at doing a more adult repertoire with a group called De Makkers failed. As a young singer, she performed until 1973.

In the late 1960s, she appeared in a number of German-language films. She also travelled around the world, and appeared in TV shows.

In 2003, a CD with old and new songs of her was produced ("Wilma –- toen en nu", which means "Wilma – Then and Now"). In the song "Gouden platen – volle zalen" (Golden Records – Full Halls) she gives a melancholy review of her life as one of the most successful child stars of all time. She decided to try another comeback in 2009, and recorded (with Sylvia Corpiér) a duet, "Niets of Niemand" (Nothing or No One).The song was ranked No. 1 in Holland FM Top 25 at the end of August 2009.

In October 2022, she performed as a kind of farewell in Enschede along with her brother Henny Thijssen singing "Onze liefde" (our love) composed by Thijssen. She was having health problems at the time. In 2023, she said she still received messages from fans. In May 2025, in improved health, she performed again with her brother at Muziekfeest op het Plein (music festival on the square) in Leeuwarden.

== Personal life ==
Landkroon began her career when she was 11 years old at her divorced father's insistence. She came under the direction of Gert Timmerman, when she would go on stage at least three times per day. As a result, she never completed her education. Her first three hits were under Timmerman's direction. Later she came under the direction of Pierre Kartner. Wilma came became entangled in an onerous contract under the management of Ben Essing, when she needed stimulants to perform every night.

After 1973, Landkroon got into trouble due to misbehaviour and had several contacts with the police.

Landkroon did not gain financial rewards from her successes, as cunning managers kept the proceeds for themselves. She alleged that one manager had swindled her. She had held negative feelings towards Gert Timmerman and Pierre Kartner, but she would later visit with Timmerman to reconcile, and wished to do so with Kartner but his death in 2022 prevented that.

In 1995, Landkroon lost her collection of golden records in a household fire. Later, music producer Edwin van Hoevelaak was searching for artists who had won golden records for his TV program Goud! (Gold) on RTV Oost. In the process, he came upon the story of Wilma Landkroon and her lost collection. Van Hoevelaak found a replacement golden record and presented it to her in 2025.

She is the younger sister of singer Reiny Landkroon and singer-songwriter Henny Thijssen. She has two sons from a former marriage, and also a grand-daughter.

== Discography (Dutch) (selected) ==
=== Singles ===
- 1968 Heintje, baue ein Schloss für mich (German)
- 1969 Toverfee
- 1969 80 rode rozen
- 1969 Een klomp met een zeiltje
- 1969 Grootpappa
- 1970 Huil toch niet als je weg moet gaan
- 1970 'n Suikerspin
- 1971 Zou het erg zijn (with Pierre Kartner)
- 1971 Ik heb een vraag (with Pierre Kartner)
- 1971 Schenkt man sich Rosen in Tirol (with John van Kesteren) (German)
- 1972 Gebeurtenissen
- 1972 Waarom laat iedereen mij zo alleen
- 1973 Michael (with De Makkers)
- 2009 Niets of Niemand (with Sylvia Corpiér)

=== Albums ===
- 1969 Wilma
- 1969 Wilma's Kerstfeest
- 1970 Veel liefs van...
- 1971 Zou het erg zijn lieve opa
- 1993 De 34 beste van Wilma
- 2003 Wilma - toen en nu
- 2004 Wilma - Dubbelgoud = Dubbelgoed (Dutch - German)
