= Henny Thijssen =

Dutch singer-composer (born 1952)

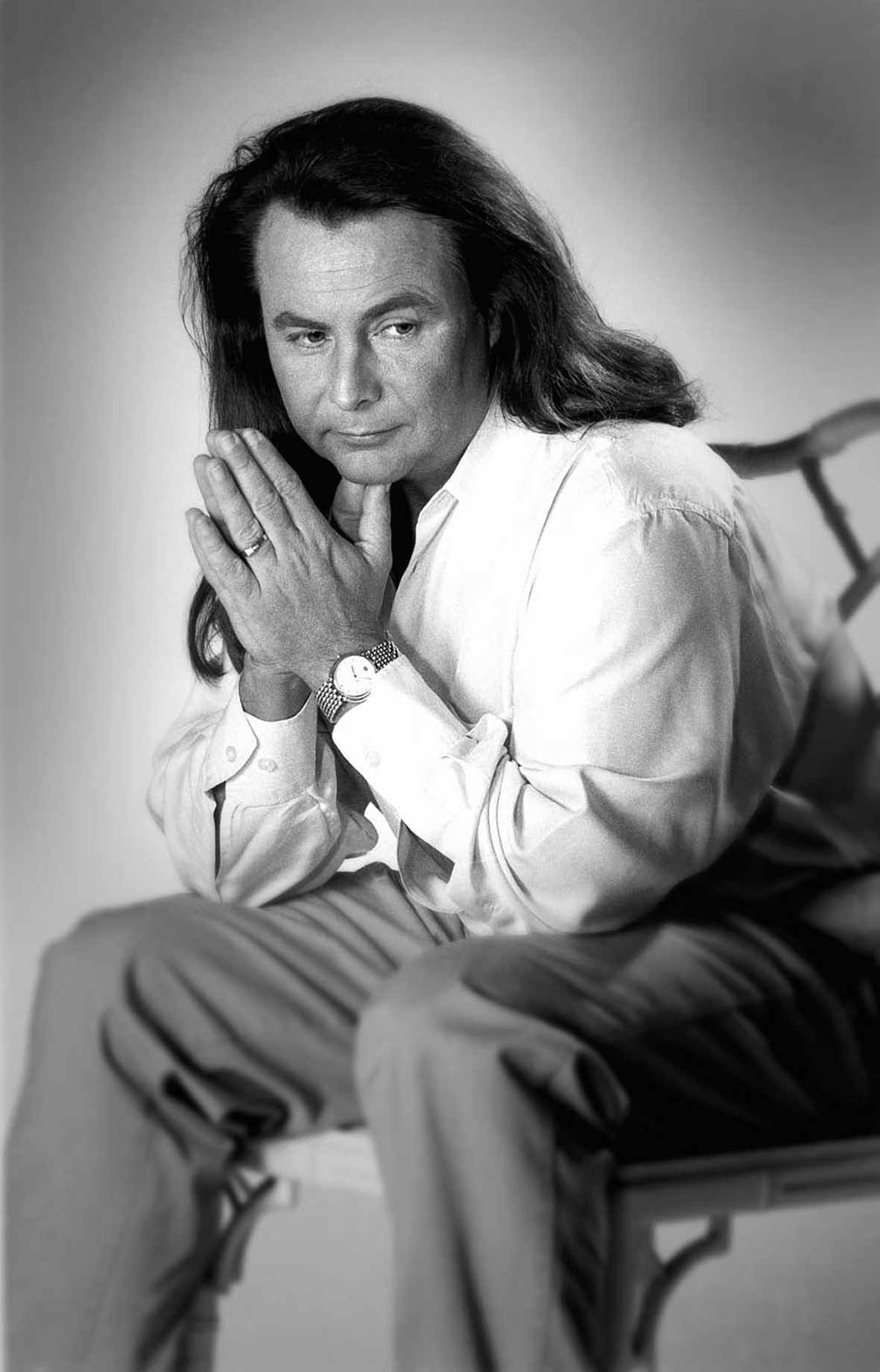

Henny Thijssen (born April 18, 1952, Enschede) is a Dutch singer-composer. He is the elder brother of singers Wilma and Reiny Landkroon.

In 1988, Thijssen received 1st place public jury and the 3rd place specialized jury with Save Our Planet in the World Songfestival in Bratislava, Slovakia. In 1998, he published Tastbaar and, in 2008, he published Levensecht.

His last singles were Tabbe Tabbe Tab (2007), Die Nacht is mijn Leven (2008; with Henri van Velzen) and Dans nog een keer met mij (2008) what was a nice success in the Netherlands Charts. Thijssen writes songs for many Dutch artists.

Awards and achievements
Preceded by Ruud Hermans	The Voice Senior; Winner; 2020	Succeeded by Phil Bee
