= Frans Bauer =

Dutch singer

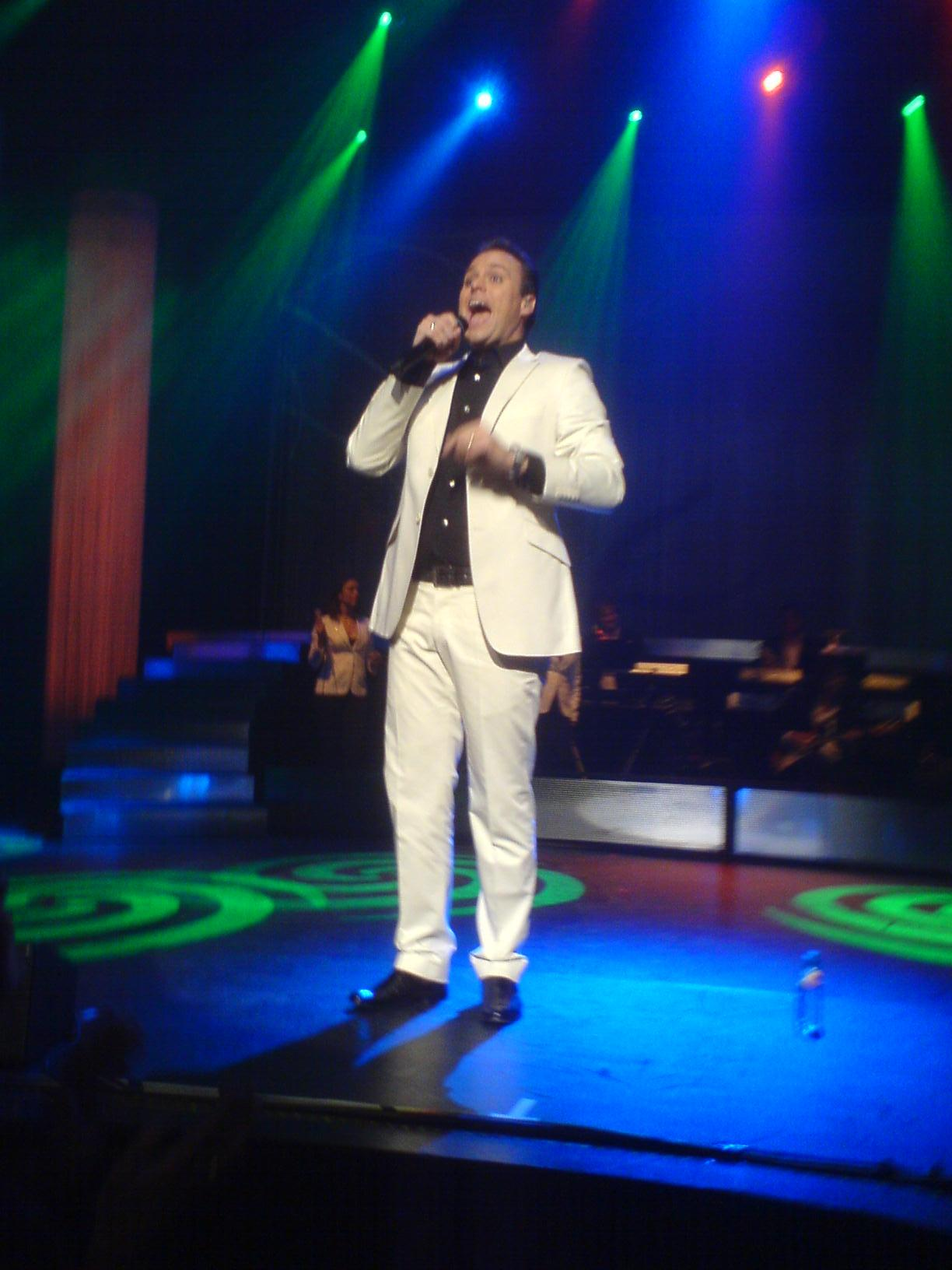

Background information
- Also known as: Frans Bauer
- Born: François van Dooren; 30 December 1973 (age 52)
- Origin: Netherlands
- Genres: Pop; Schlager
- Occupation: Singer
- Instrument: Vocals
- Years active: 1994–present

Frans Bauer (born 30 December 1973 in Roosendaal as François van Dooren) is a Dutch singer in the levenslied genre.

== Early life ==
Frans Bauer was born as François van Dooren, after his mother Wies van Dooren who wasn't married to his father Chris Bauer (1944-2015) at the time. From an early age, Frans Bauer was determined to become a singer. His great idols are Julio Iglesias, Elvis Presley and Koos Alberts. By the latter, he was sometimes brought on stage to sing along with Ik verscheurde je foto (I tore up your photo).

== Career ==
=== 20th century ===
Bauer's own musical career was shaped in 1987, when he recorded his first single Ben je jong (Are you young) under the supervision of producers Riny Schreijenberg and Emile Hartkamp. Bauer grew to be a local celebrity in his hometown, Fijnaart.

He received his first national attention through the television programme All you need is love (1991), in which, with the permission of his girlfriend Mariska, he could select two female fans (who both coincidentally are named Diana) to go out with him for an evening. The television show made Bauer famous, though, mostly because of the denial of national radio stations, it was only in 1994 that Bauer achieved his first hit called Als sterren aan de hemel staan (If stars are in the heavens)

In 1997, he published his first album for the German Schlager album, Weil Ich Dich Liebe (Because I love you). In the same year, De Regenboog (The Rainbow), a duet with Dutch singer Marianne Weber reached number 1 in the Dutch charts. The year 1997 for Bauer however ended tragically: two members of his band, returning from a concert, died in a traffic incident.

Thanks to his fans Frans Bauer became increasingly popular. In March 1998 he gave his first series of concerts in Ahoy.

=== 21st century ===
In 2003 the reality soap De Bauers, about the family life of Frans and Mariska, was a much-watched television programme. Bauer is an ambassador of Villa Pardoes, for children with life-threatening diseases. In 2004, Bauer, because of his charity work and singing, was appointed to Knight of the Order of Orange-Nassau. In the same year, he won the Gouden Televizier-ring, a Dutch television prize, awarded by the public.

In 2014 Bauer was the main character in the book 'Heb je even voor mij?' written by Wim Hendrikse. From 2019 to 2021, Bauer was one of the coaches in the Dutch television show The Voice Senior.
