= Jimi Bellmartin =

Dutch singer (1949–2021)

- Born: Jimi Silawanebessy; 29 January 1949; Bogor, Indonesia
- Died: 28 May 2021 (aged 72); Den Bosch, The Netherlands
- Occupation: Singer
- Years active: 1970–2021
- Known for: Singing

Jimi Bellmartin (29 January 1949 – 28 May 2021) was a Dutch singer of Moluccan descent.

== Early life ==
Bellmartin was born in Bogor, Indonesia on January 29, 1949. He moved to Den Bosch in the Netherlands at the age of 1.

== Career ==
Bellmartin released his first single called This is my lovesong / The winter of my life in 1970.

In 2007, Bellmartin started as the singer of a funk band called The Soul Snatchers.

In 2018, Bellmartin participated in the Dutch TV Show The Voice Senior which he won. In this show he was coached by Gordon and Gerard Joling. After winning, Bellmartin was allowed to record an EP and perform live at the Ziggo Dome.

== Death ==
He died on 28 May 2021, after a short illness.

Awards and achievements
Preceded by N/A	The Voice Senior; Winner; 2018	Succeeded by Ruud Hermans
