= Eddy Vilard =

Mexican actor and model (born 1988)

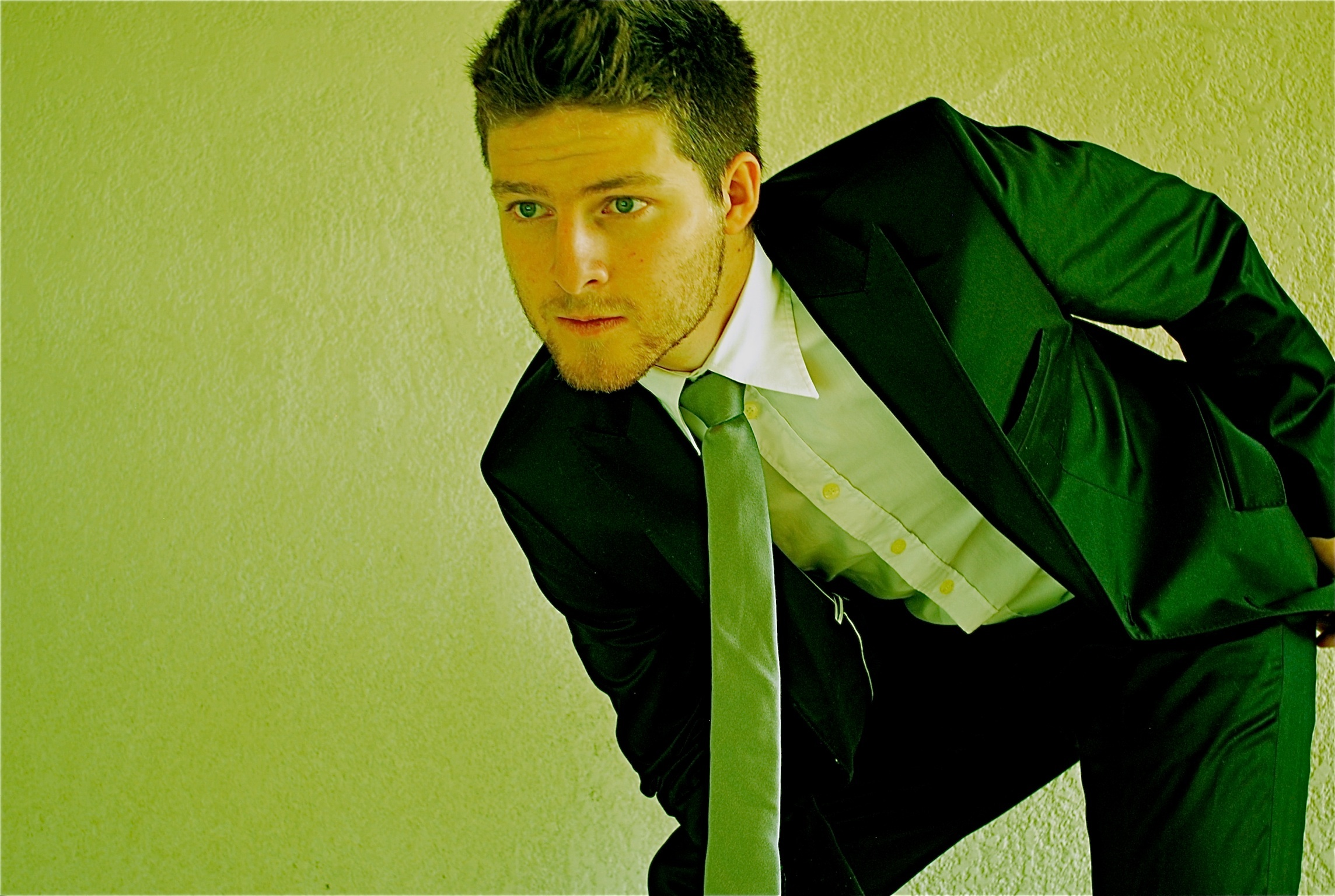
- Born: Manuel Eduardo Villasana Ruiz; November 2, 1988 (age 37); Cancún, Quintana Roo, Mexico
- Occupation: Actor
- Years active: 2004-present

Eddy Vilard (born Martin Eduardo Villasana Ruiz on November 2, 1988) is a Mexican actor and model.

== Biography ==
Before joining the cast of Rebelde, Eddy Vilard was part of the Necaxa and Cruz Azul soccer teams; he was going to be drafted to Argentina to play pro-soccer because of his skills, but he hit a nerve while playing and was unable to go. He appeared in Belinda's music video for her hit single "Ángel".

He was born in Cancún, Quintana Roo, Mexico.

== Filmography ==
=== Film ===
Year	Title	Role	Notes
2004	Avisos de ocasión	Michael	Film debut

=== Television ===
Year	Title	Role	Notes
2004-2006	Rebelde	Teódoro "Téo" Ruiz Palacios	Television debut
2007	Lola, érase una vez	Archibaldo Von Ferdinand	
2008-2009	Alma de hierro	Luis "Wicho" Hierro Jiménez	
2009	Mujeres asesinas	Leonardo Saavedra	"Carmen, honrada" (Season 2, Episode 13)
2012	Amor bravío	Pablo Albarrán	
2013	Noches con Platanito	Himself	"Eddie Vilard/Dulce María/Banda El Recodo" (Season 1, Episode 18)
2014-2015	Hasta el fin del mundo	Oliver Peralta Carbonell	
2015-2016	Antes muerta que Lichita	Alejandro de Toledo y Mondragón Casablanca	
2016	Tres veces Ana	Daniel	
2019	México tiene talento	Host	Debut as host
2020–present	La Voz	Host	
2021–present	La Voz Kids	Host	
2021	La Voz Senior	Host	
2023–present	Punto Final	Analyst	

== Awards and nominations ==
=== TVyNovelas Awards ===
Year	Category	Telenovela	Result
2009	Best Male Revelation	Alma de Hierro	Won
2013	Best Young Lead Actor	Amor Bravio	Nominated
