= Yahir =

Mexican singer and actor

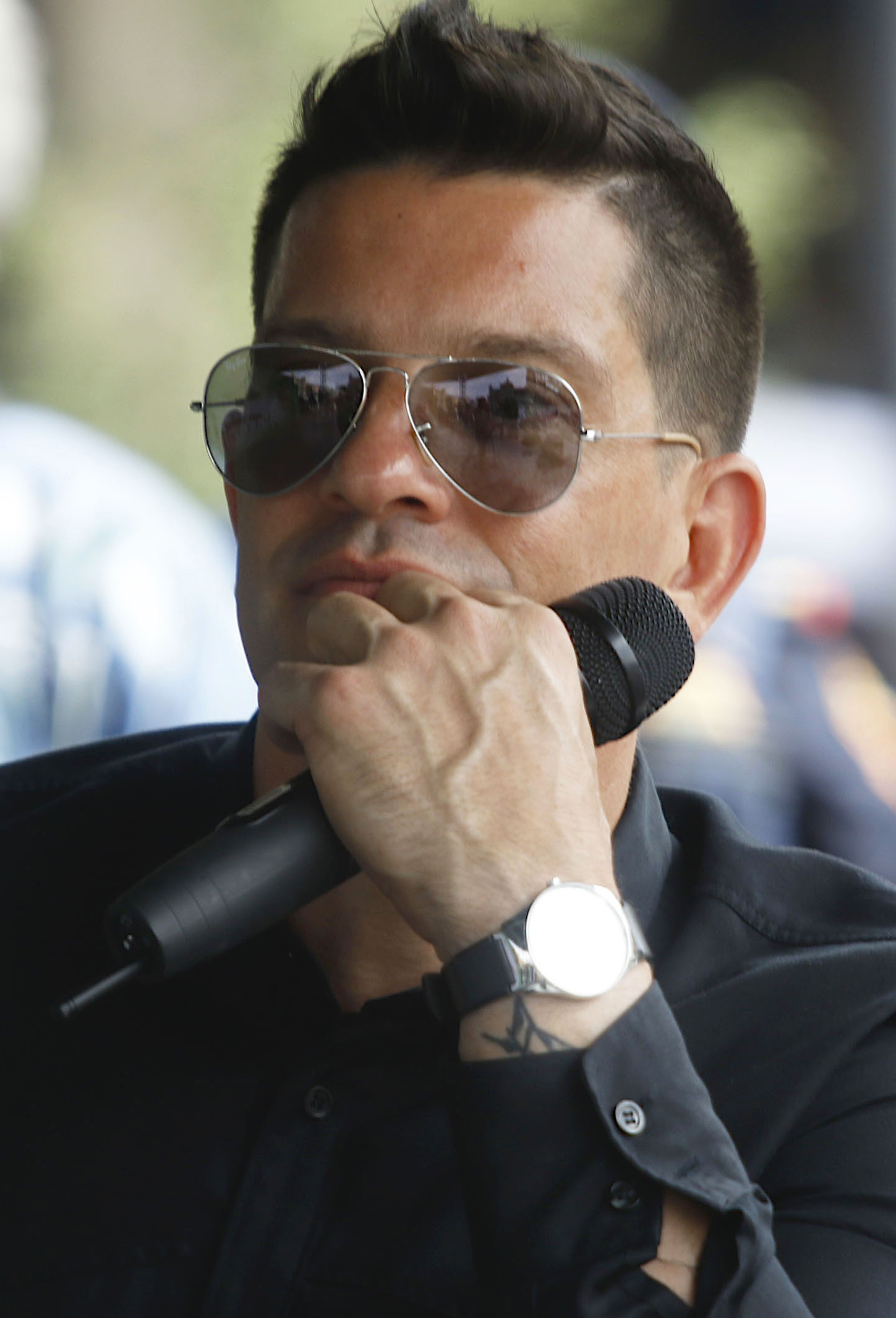
- Yahir in 2019

Background information
- Born: Yahir Othón Parra; 21 March 1979 (age 47); Hermosillo, Sonora, Mexico
- Genres: Latin pop
- Occupation: Singer
- Instrument: Vocals
- Years active: 2002–present
- Website: http://www.yahir.tv

Yahir Othón Parra (born 21 March 1979), simply known as Yahir, is a Mexican singer and actor from Hermosillo, Sonora. He began his career as one of the participants in the music reality show La Academia in 2002 and in addition to Yuridia, also from Hermosillo, is one of the most popular stars to come from the show. He became a judge of the show's tenth season.

== Personal life ==
Yahir's mother converted from Roman Catholicism to Jehovah's Witnesses, and although he was brought up in his mother's faith he no longer practices it. He says that despite their differing beliefs his mother is now one of his biggest fans.

== Career ==
His first hit single was a cover of Italian singer Tiziano Ferro's biggest hit in Mexico, "Alucinado", taken from his first album "Yahir" in 2003. His next album, "Otra Historia De Amor" in 2004 produced the hit single "La Locura". In 2005, Yahir decided to make a tribute album to Brazilian singer Roberto Carlos with the entire album being covers of Carlos' hits. This album was titled "No Te Apartes De Mi" (2005) and had a hit single in the title track. In 2006, Yahir recorded his fourth album "Con El Alma Entre Las Manos..." which produced two hit singles: "Maldito Amor" and "El Amor". This was followed by a greatest hits album "Recuerdos" in 2007, and a new studio album "Elemental" in 2009, and a tribute album "Sexto" in 2012.

Yahir is also a television actor for TV Azteca, having appeared in two telenovelas. Yahir's debut in the telenovela world was through "Enamórate"(2003) opposite Martha Higareda in which he played "Yahir Jimenez" a son of a prominent businessman. After "Enamórate" he started in "Soñarás" (You Will Dream) playing "Rey" a charismatic young musician who is a waiter at the bar he plays at after his shift. His co star was Vanessa Acosta. He was also the protagonist of "Bellezas Indomables"

In 2019, he was one of the coaches for the first season of the Mexican singing competition show, La Voz on TV Azteca after being acquired from Televisa after 7 seasons.

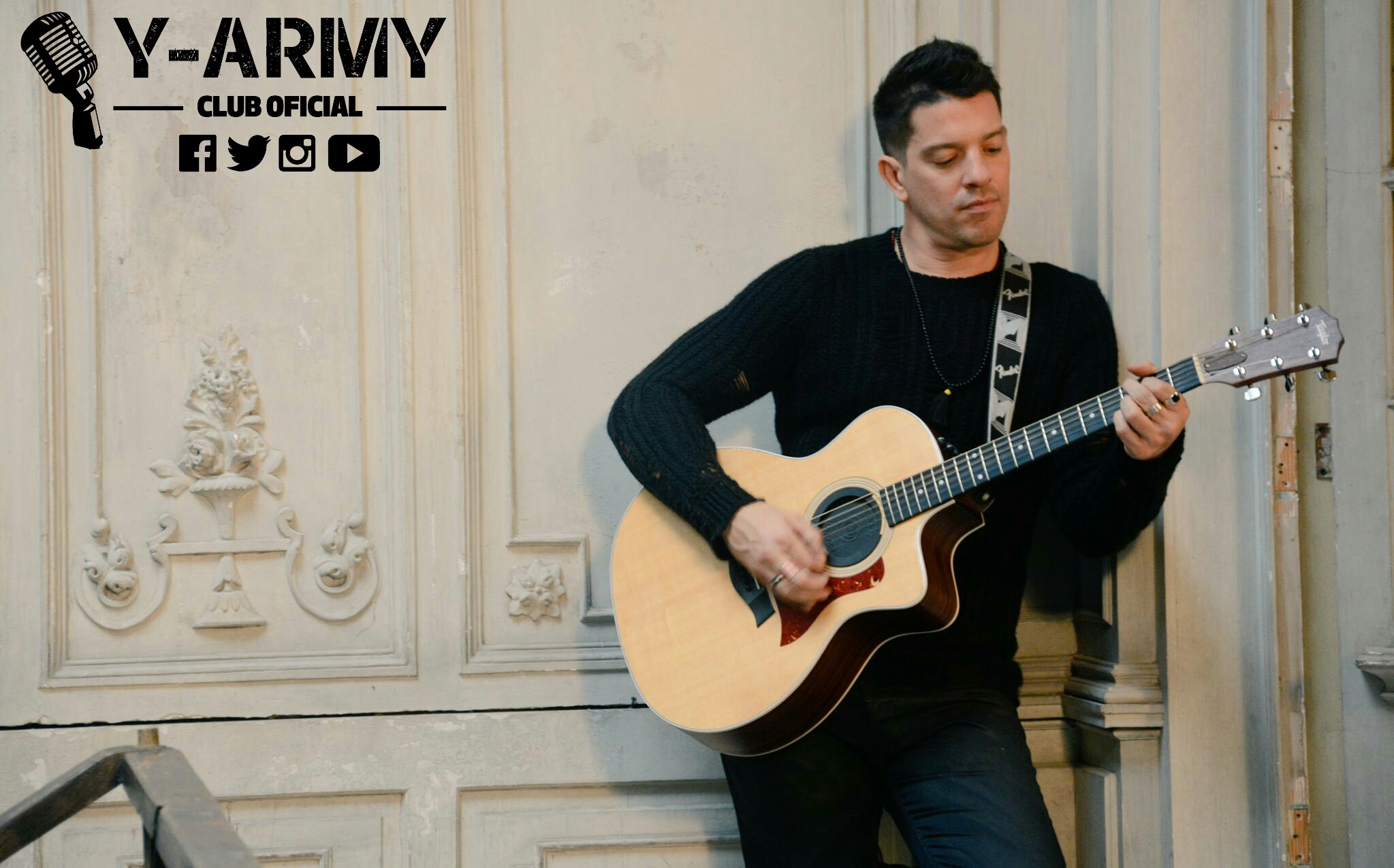
Yahir Othon Parra

== Discography ==
- Yahir (2003)
- Otra Historia De Amor (2004)
- No Te Apartes De Mí (2005)
- Con El Alma Entre Las Manos (2006)
- Recuerdos (2007)
- Elemental (2009)
- Quiéreme... Elemental Reloaded (2010)
- Sexto VI (2012)
- Zona Preferente (Live) (2013)
- + Allá (2016)

== Singles ==
- Alucinado- No. 1 (MEX)
- Contigo Si w/ Nadia- No. 3 (MEX)
- La Locura- No. 2 (MEX)
- Te Amare- No. 7 (MEX)
- No Te Apartes de Mi- No. 2 (MEX)
- Maldito Amor- No. 8 (MEX)
- El Amor- No. 6 (MEX)
- Márcame la piel- No. 10 (MEX)
- Viviré – No. 7 (MEX)
- Adiós Para Siempre – No. 16 (MEX)
- Soledad – No. 18 (MEX)
- Si Tu Te Vas
- Perdóname
- Vivi Así Es Morir de Amor
- El Alma en Pie – a dueto con Yuridia (En Vivo / Live) (2013) – No. 1 (MEX)
- Casualmente Miraste (En Vivo / Live) (2013)

== Videography ==
- Alucinado
- La Locura
- Detalles
- Contigo si
- Amiga
- Marcame la Piel
- Vivire
- Soledad
- Si tu te vas
- Perdoname

== Filmography ==
| Year | Title | Role | Notes |
|---|---|---|---|
| 2003 | Enamórate | Yahir Jiménez | Lead role |
| 2004 | Soñarás | Rey | Lead role |
| 2007–2008 | Bellezas Indomables | Manuel Molina / Fernando Blanco | Lead role |
| 2010 | Quiéreme tonto | Guillermo Romero | Lead role |
| 2017 | Mi marido tiene familia | Xavi Galán | Supporting Role |
| 2021 | La desalmada | Santiago Ramirez | Special appearance |
