= Limited Edition (Yolandita Monge album) =

Remix album by Yolandita Monge
- Released: 1991
- Recorded: San Juan
- Genre: Latin pop
- Label: Sony Discos
- Producer: Rudy Pérez, Ricardo Eddy, Pablo Manavello, Pablo Flores, Javier Garza

Yolandita Monge chronology
Portfolio (1990)	Limited Edition (1991)	Mis Canciones Preferidas 2 (1991)

Limited Edition is a remix album by Puerto Rican singer Yolandita Monge and the first ever of its kind by any Latin performer, male or female.

It was produced and remixed by internationally known DJ and producer Pablo Flores along with his partner, Grammy-winning engineer Javier Garza. The album includes the new Megamix and selected remixes from the previously released Maxi Singles of Por Tí, Fuiste Un Sueño and No Me Acostumbro. The cover is a new color painted photo from Vivencias by Raúl Torres. It was released in 1991 and is out of print in all media formats.

== Track listing ==
Track	Title	Composer(s)	Original Version(s) Taken From The Album(s)	Length
01	"Megamix (Fuiste Un Sueño, Por Tí, No Me Acostumbro)"	Pablo Manavello/Giorgio Spagna, Alfredo Larry Pignagnoli, Ivana Spagna, Rudy Pérez/Pablo Manavello	Portfolio & Vivencias	18:54
02	"Fuiste Un Sueño (Pablo's Dream Single)"	Pablo Manavello	Portfolio	04:12
03	"Por Tí (Pablo Flores Club Mix Single)"	Giorgio Spagna, Alfredo Larry Pignagnoli, Ivana Spagna, Rudy Pérez	Vivencias	03:48
04	"No Me Acostumbro (Pablo Flores Acostumbrate Mix Single)"	Pablo Manavello	Portfolio	04:21
05	"No Me Acostumbro (Pablo Flores Acostumbrate Mix)"	Pablo Manavello	Portfolio	06:12

== Credits and personnel ==
- Vocals: Yolandita Monge
- All Additional Production, Megamix and Remixes by Pablo Flores and Javier Garza for Hits' n' Mixes Productions
- Artwork and Concept: Raúl Torres
- Graphic Design: Luis Rafael Vázquez and Lydia Gregory

== Notes ==
- Track listing and credits from album cover.
- Released in Cassette Format on 1991 (DIC-80601).
- Released in CD Format on 1991 (CD-80601).
