= La Voz (Mexican TV series) season 7 =

La Voz
- Season 7
- Hosted by: Lele Pons; Odalys Ramirez
- Coaches: Maluma; Anitta; Carlos Rivera; Natalia Jiménez
- No. of contestants: 48 artists
- Winner: Cristina Ramos
- Winning coach: Carlos Rivera
- Runner-up: Diana Villamonte

Release
- Original network: Las Estrellas
- Original release: September 30 – December 16, 2018

Season chronology
- Next → Season 8

The seventh season of the Mexican version of La Voz... México premiere on September 30, 2018 through the channel Las Estrellas. For the first time in 5 seasons, Jacqueline Bracamontes will not be the presenter, and this time the program will be hosted by Lele Pons and Odalys Ramírez behind the scenes. The coaches are Maluma, (for the second time), Carlos Rivera, Anitta and Natalia Jiménez This is the second season of La Voz... México with a jury with a different nationality for each coach (Carlos Rivera is Mexican, Natalia Jimenez is Spanish, Maluma is Colombian and Anitta is Brazilian) after the second edition in 2012 (Paulina Rubio is Mexican, Jenni Rivera is Mexican-American, Beto Cuevas is Chilean and Miguel Bosé is Spanish). In addition, this is the season with the youngest coaches, not only in Mexico, but in the worldwide format.

== Coaches and presenters ==
The seventh season has four new coaches Natalia Jiménez, Carlos Rivera, Anitta and Maluma. The show continues to be hosted by Lele Pons and Odalys Ramírez behind the scenes.

== Recordings ==
Nine of the ten episodes of this season were recorded in August 2018. This is the first time that almost the entire season was recorded in less than a month; the first probably due to the coaches' schedules. The Grand Final will take place on December 16, with eight participants (two per team).

== Teams ==
Key

Winner
Runner-up
Third place
Cuarto place
Eliminated in the final
Eliminated in the semi-final
Stolen in the Battles
Eliminated in the Battles

Coaches	Top 48					
Maluma						
Maluma	Diana Villamonte	Ley Memphis	Erika Alcocer	Paola Guanche	Francisco Treviño	Nacho Pérez
Maluma	Ariel Vi	José Dhalí	~~Gabby Tamez~~	~~Jesús De la Rosa~~	Lilian El Jeitani	B.A.E.
Maluma	Estefanía Martínez	Liliana García				
Anitta						
Anitta	Delian	Ángel Elizondo	Mafer Labastida	Morganna Love	Jesús De la Rosa	Luanna Silva
Anitta	Colette Acuña	Diana Campos	~~Norah Montero~~	Maverick López	André Eliz	Andah
Anitta	Hugo Lezama	Marlen Barrera				
Carlos Rivera						
Carlos Rivera	Cristina Ramos	Guillermo Mendoza	Aneeka	Mad Rapsodia	Dulce Najar	Gabby Tamez
Carlos Rivera	Rey Cristopher	Ale Ramírez	~~Ley Memphis~~	~~Colette Acuña~~	~~Luis Ochoa~~	Rolando Lesmo
Carlos Rivera	Renné Dacosta	Luis Eduardo Chávez				
Natalia Jiménez						
Natalia Jiménez	Carmen Goett	Adriana y Cristian	Maggy Aranda	Cindy Coleoni	Anthon Mor	Norah Montero
Natalia Jiménez	Luis Ochoa	Rosa Michell	~~Cristina Ramos~~	~~Francisco Treviño~~	Adelaide Pilar	Hugo Coronel
Natalia Jiménez	Aarón Antonio	Santiago Jiménez				
Note: Italicized names are stolen artists (names struck through within former teams).

== Blind auditions ==
The goal of each coach will be to choose twelve participants for their teams

Color key

✔	Coach pressed "QUIERO TU VOZ" button
	Artist defaulted to a coach's team
	Artist elected a coach's team
	Artist was eliminated with no coach pressing his or her "QUIERO TU VOZ" button
	Artist in Red, auditioned inside "The Box"
✘	Coach pressed the "QUIERO TU VOZ" button, but was blocked by Natalia from getting the artist
✘	Coach pressed the "QUIERO TU VOZ" button, but was blocked by Carlos from getting the artist
✘	Coach pressed the "QUIERO TU VOZ" button, but was blocked by Anitta from getting the artist
✘	Coach pressed the "QUIERO TU VOZ" button, but was blocked by Maluma from getting the artist

=== Episode 1 (September 30) ===
The coaches presented "Vivir mi vida" at the beginning of the program.

Order	Artist	Age	Hometown	Song	Coach's and artist's choices			
Order	Artist	Age	Hometown	Song	Natalia	Carlos	Anitta	Maluma
1	Diana Villamonte	23	Puerto Vallarta, Jalisco	"And I Am Telling You I'm Not Going"	✔	✔	✔	✔
2	Guillermo Mendoza	32	Mexico City	"Te Amaré"	✔	✔	✔	✔
3	Mafer Labastida	28	Puebla, Puebla	"Open Arms"	✔	✔	✔	—
4	Marianna Serra	27	Mexico City	"Inolvidable"	–	–	–	–
5	Maggy Aranda	46	Monterrey, Nuevo León	"Back in Black"	✔	—	—	—
6	Luis Ochoa	22	Tangamandapio, Michoacan	"Entre beso y beso"	✔	✔	✔	✔
7	Joana Berenice	31	Guadalajara, Jalisco	"El último beso"	—	—	—	—
8	Ley Memphis	69	Mazamitla, Jalisco	"House of the Rising Sun"	✔	✔	✔*	✔
9	Norah Montero	24	Mexico City	"Vive"	✔	—	✔	✔
10	Morganna Love	38	San Miguel de Allende, Guanajuato	"Habanera"	✔	✔	✔	✘
11	Gerardo Meléndez	32	Tonalá, Jalisco	"El Negrito Bailarín"	—	—	—	—
12	Erika Alcocer	42	Tampico, Tamaulipas	"Never Enough"	✘	✔	✔	✔

- Carlos Rivera presses Anitta's button

=== Episode 2 (October 7) ===
- During the program, "Recuérdame" by Carlos Rivera is performed.
- Cristina Ramos' audition aired on October 7, but her decision was not announced until October 14, during the next audition show.

Order	Artist	Age	Hometown	Song	Coach's and artist's choices			
Order	Artist	Age	Hometown	Song	Natalia	Carlos	Anitta	Maluma
1	Carmen Goett	19	Puerto Aventuras, Quintana Roo	"Amazing Grace"	✔	✔	✔	✔
2	Emilio Osorio	15	Mexico City	"El baño"	—	—	—	—
3	Paola Guanche	17	Cancún, Quintana Roo	"Girl on Fire"	✔	✔	✔	✔
4	Dueto Terra	50y56	Guadalajara, Jalisco	"Te quiero, te quiero"	—	—	—	—
5	Gabby Tamez	25	China, Nuevo León	"Si una vez"	—	✔	—	✔
6	Nacho Pérez	29	Aguascalientes, Aguascalientes	"Call Out My Name"	✔	✔	✔	✔
7	Ariel Vi	23	Cerro Azul, Veracruz	"Bella"	—	—	—	✔
8	Enero del Moral	21	San Francisco del Rincón, Guanajuato	"Me cuesta tanto olvidarte"	—	—	—	—
9	Luanna Silva	18	Rio de Janeiro, Brazil	"Paradinha"	✔	✔	✔	✘
10	Marlen Barrera	27	Monterrey, Nuevo León	"Toxic"	—	—	✔	—
11	B.A.E.	20 y 21	Mexico City / Colombia / Venezuela	"Andas en Mi Cabeza"	—	✔	—	✔
12	Dulce Najar	30	Mexico City	"Mi Peor Error"	✔	✔	—	—
13	Omar Zúñiga	15	Torreón, Coahuila	"A quien"	—	—	—	—
14	Cristina Ramos	40	Islas Canarias, España	"La Traviata" / "It's Raining Men"	✔	✔	✔	✔

=== Episode 3 (October 14) ===
- During the program, "Beautiful" is performed by Lele Pons in a blind audition with a snare drum and a medley of "Algo más" and "Daría" by Natalia Jiménez played on the ukulele.

Order	Artist	Age	Hometown	Song	Coach's and artist's choices			
Order	Artist	Age	Hometown	Song	Natalia	Carlos	Anitta	Maluma
1	Hugo Lezama	47	Minatitlán, Veracruz	"Te quiero tal como eres"	✔	–	✔	✔
2	Ale Lomelí	20	Ensenada, Baja California	"¿Por Qué Terminamos?"	–	–	–	–
3	Cindy Coleoni	25	Bacalar, Quintana Roo / Argentina	"Don't Speak"	✔	✔	✔	–
4	Caro Mancilla	24	Monterrey, Nuevo León	"Mediocre"	–	–	–	–
5	Francisco Treviño	23	Monterrey, Nuevo León	"Lose Yourself"	✔	–	–	✔
6	Rolando Lesmo	29	Querétaro, Querétaro / Cuba	"Tardes Negras"	–	✔	–	–
7	Cellik Hazel Rivera	17	Nacajuca, Tabasco	"Por Siempre Tu"	–	–	–	–
8	Anthon Mor	16	Mexico City	"I'm Still Standing"	✔	✔	–	–
9	Ramón Rodríguez	22	Torreón, Coahuila	"No te apartes de mí"	–	–	–	–
10	Aneeka	32	San Cristóbal, Venezuela	"Sin Combustible"	✔	✔	✔	✔
11	Renné Dacosta	26	Navojoa, Sonora	"Solamente Tú"	✔	✔	✔	✔
12	Lucca Restori	25	Mexico City	"Cama y Mesa"	–	–	–	–
13	Adriana Rojas y Cristian Rivera	26 y 28	Mexico City	"That's What I Like"	✔	✘	✔	✔

=== Episode 4 (October 21) ===
- During the program, Anitta performed "Delirio."

Order	Artist	Age	Hometown	Song	Coach's and artist's choices			
Order	Artist	Age	Hometown	Song	Natalia	Carlos	Anitta	Maluma
1	Guimel Romero	28	Mexico City	"Tú sí sabes quererme"	–	–	–	–
2	Francisco Morales	22	Mexico City	"Human"	–	–	–	–
3	Hugo Coronel	19	Mexicali, Baja California	"Bachata Rosa"	✔	✔	✔	✔
4	Ale Ramírez	26	Cadereyta Jiménez, Nuevo León	"Cobarde"	✔	✔	–	–
5	Luis Eduardo Chávez	32	Guadalajara, Jalisco	"Más que tu Amigo"	✔	✔	–	–
6	Santiago Jiménez	17	Mexico City	"No hay nadie más"	✔	—	—	—
7	Fátima Yesenia Díaz	18	Mexicali, Baja California	"Algo Contigo"	–	–	–	–
8	Rosa Michell	17	Guamúchil, Sinaloa	"Cicatrices"	✔	–	✔	–
9	Alexi Rebolledo	20	Veracruz, Veracruz	"Se te olvidó"	–	–	–	–
10	Aarón Antonio	21	Mexico City	"Déjala que vuelva"	✔	—	—	—
11	Ángel Elizondo	21	Torreón, Coahuila	"Love on Top"	—	—	✔	—
12	Alex Portillo	28	Mexico City	"El color de tus ojos"	–	–	–	–
13	Colette Acuña	35	Ciudad Victoria, Tamaulipas	"Culpable o No"	✔	✔	–	–

=== Episode 5 (October 28) ===
- During the program, "El Préstamo" is performed by Maluma.

Order	Artist	Age	Hometown	Song	Coach's and artist's choices			
Order	Artist	Age	Hometown	Song	Natalia	Carlos	Anitta	Maluma
1	Diana Campos	16	Tijuana, Baja California	"New Rules"	—	—	✔	✔
2	Jesús de la Rosa	24	Maracaibo, Venezuela	"Se Preparó"	—	—	—	✔
3	Rick Loera	30	Mexico City	"I Love Rock 'n Roll"	—	—	—	—
4	Rey Cristopher	24	Valladolid, Yucatán	"Mi soldedad y yo"	✔	✔	–	–
5	Andrea "Andah" García	30	Mexico city	"When We Were Young"	✔	✔	✔	–
6	Lilian El Jeitani	18	Querétaro, Querétaro	"Amorfoda"	—	—	—	✔
7	Maverick López	22	Vinaroz, España	"Perfect"	–	✔	✔	✔
8	André Eliz	19	Ensenada, Baja California	"Te boté"	—	—	✔	—
9	Adelaide Pilar	35	Los Ángeles, California	"Tiene Espinas El Rosal"	✔	—	—	—
10	Liliana García	34	Ciudad Madero, Tamaulipas	"Ángel"	Team full	—	—	✔
11	Estefanía Martínez	23	Monterrey, Nuevo León	"De Repente"	Team full	—	—	✔
12	Mad Rapsodia	23	Mexico city	"A Natural Woman"	Team full	✔	✔	✔
13	Delian	25	San Diego, California	"Friends"	Team full	Team full	✔	✔
14	José Dhalí	22	Ciudad Juárez, Chihuahua	"Believer"	Team full	Team full	Team full	✔

== The Battles ==
The battle round began at the end of episode 5. The coaches will face two contestants from their team in a duet, choosing one to advance to the next round, with the other being eliminated from their team. In addition, each coach is awarded two "steals," giving them the opportunity to save losing contestants. The winning and stolen contestants will advance to the Semifinal round. The co-coaches were Sofía Reyes for Team Natalia, Tommy Torres for Team Carlos, Prince Royce for Team Anitta, and the Piso 21 group for Team Maluma.

Color key:

Artist won the Battle and advanced to the Semifinal
Artist lost the Battle but was stolen by another coach
Artist lost the Battle and was eliminated

Episode	Coach	Order	Winner	Song	Loser	'Steal' result			
Episode	Coach	Order	Winner	Song	Loser	Natalia	Carlos	Anitta	Maluma
Episode 5	Natalia Jiménez	1	Carmen Goett	"Nessun dorma"	Cristina Ramos	N/A	✔	✔	–
Episode 6 (Sunday, November 4)	Maluma	1	Erika Alcocer	"El Triste"	Liliana García	–	–	–	N/A
Episode 6 (Sunday, November 4)	Carlos Rivera	2	Mad Rapsodia	"Can't Help Falling in Love"	Ley Memphis	–	N/A	–	✔
Episode 6 (Sunday, November 4)	Anitta	3	Mafer Labastida	"Sweet Child o' Mine"	Marlen Barrera	–	–	N/A	–
