= Alejandro Jano Fuentes =

Mexican singer (1971–2016)

Alejandro "Jano" Fuentes (16 June 1971 – 18 June 2016) was a Mexican singer best known for his participation in La Voz... México, the Mexican version of The Voice.

Fuentes was in a car after celebrating his 45th birthday in Chicago, when an individual approached the car in South Archer Avenue near Brighton Park and tried to force him out of the car at gunpoint. When Fuentes refused, the attacker shot him several times in the head. Fuentes was rushed to Mount Sinai Hospital where he initially was pronounced dead at 2:07 pm, but then put on life support and finally pronounced dead on 18 June.
