= Ricardo Montaner (album) =

Studio album by Ricardo Montaner
- Released: 1986
- Recorded: 1986
- Studio: Estudios Audio Uno (Caracas, Venezuela)
- Genre: Latin pop · latin ballad (80s)
- Length: 40:55
- Label: TH-Rodven
- Producer: Pablo Manavello

Ricardo Montaner chronology
Cada Día (1983)	Ricardo Montaner (1986)	Ricardo Montaner, Vol. 2 (1988)

Ricardo Montaner is the debut studio album recorded by Venezuelan singer-songwriter Ricardo Montaner. It was released by TH-Rodven. It reached No. 1 on the Billboard Latin Pop Albums chart.

== Track listing ==
No.	Title	Writer(s)	Length
1.	"Uno Del Otro"	Pablo Manavello	04:36
2.	"Vamos A Dejarlo"	Fernando Osorio	03:58
3.	"Necesito De Ti"	Pablo Manavello	03:39
4.	"Yo Qué Te Amé"	Juan Carlos Pérez Soto	05:26
5.	"Dame Una Mañana"	Billy Alessi	03:39
6.	"Ojos Negros"		03:28
7.	"Extraño Sentimiento"	Tulio Cremisini	03:54
8.	"No Me Quites Tú Amor"	Pablo Manavello	03:32
9.	"Afortunados"		04:12
10.	"En Ti"		04:37

== Chart performance ==
Chart (1988)	Peak position
US Latin Pop Albums (Billboard)	1

== See also ==
- List of number-one Billboard Latin Pop Albums from the 1980s
