= La Voz (Mexican TV series) =

Mexican singing competition television series

- Also known as: La Voz... México (former name)
- Genre: Reality competition
- Created by: John de Mol Jr.
- Directed by: Miguel Angel Fox; José Luis Romero
- Creative directors: Cuquis Razo; AcunMedya
- Presented by: Mark Tacher; Jacqueline Bracamontes; Lele Pons; Jimena Pérez; Eddy Vilard
- Judges: Aleks Syntek; Espinoza Paz; Lucero; Alejandro Sanz; Jenni Rivera †; Beto Cuevas; Paulina Rubio; Miguel Bosé; David Bisbal; Marco Antonio Solís; Alejandra Guzmán; Wisin & Yandel; Yuri; Julión Álvarez; Laura Pausini; Ricky Martin; J Balvin; Gloria Trevi; Los Tigres del Norte; Carlos Vives; Maluma; Natalia Jiménez; Carlos Rivera; Anitta; Lupillo Rivera; Belinda; Yahir; Ricardo Montaner; María José; Christian Nodal; Edith Márquez; Jesús Navarro; Yuridia; Ha*Ash; Joss Favela
- Narrated by: Mark Tacher; Jacqueline Bracamontes; Paola Rojas; Jimena Pérez; Eddy Vilard
- Country of origin: Mexico
- Original language: Spanish
- No. of seasons: 11
- No. of episodes: 220

Production
- Executive producers: Miguel Angel Fox; José Luis Romero
- Production locations: Televisa San Ángel (2011–2018); Azteca Estudios (2019–2022)
- Camera setup: Multi-camera
- Running time: 60-180 minutes
- Production companies: Televisa (2011–2018, 2026–); Talpa Media (2011–2019); TV Azteca (2019–2022); AcunMedya (2019–2022); ITV Studios (2020–2022)

Original release
- Network: Las Estrellas
- Release: 11 September 2011 – 16 December 2018
- Network: Azteca Uno
- Release: 12 March 2019 – 29 August 2022
- Network: Nueve
- Release: March 2026

Related
- The Voice (franchise); La Voz Kids; La Voz Senior

La Voz (Spanish for The Voice) is a Mexican singing competition television series broadcast on Azteca Uno. The show originally premiered 11 September 2011, on Las Estrellas. It is based on the format of The Voice of Holland originated in the Netherlands and part of the international franchise The Voice created by television producer John de Mol Jr.

Mexico was the first Spanish-speaking country to adapt this format and the first among 6 globally. The series' first episode scored a rating of 28.2/47.1, surpassing Spanish-language TV series La Academia rating of 9.6/17.

The last series produced by Televisa had Lele Pons as host and Maluma, Anitta, Carlos Rivera and Natalia Jiménez as jury. In 2019, the license of The Voice format was acquired from Televisa to TV Azteca. A new edition was announced for this season under a different title (La Voz instead of La Voz... México) with the leadership of Jimena Pérez and with Ricardo Montaner, Yahir, Belinda and Lupillo Rivera as coaches.

The eleventh and last season on Azteca Uno was aired from June to August 2022 with David Bisbal, Yuridia, Ha*Ash, and Joss Favela forming the coaching panel.

== Program ==
The official website says of the program:

(The Voice... Mexico) is a television program that sets aside the appearance of any competitor, that matters is finding a new voice to the end the program. The Voice... Mexico tries to find candidates with real vocal skills. And for that, four major music stars, are responsible for finding and training the next great Voice of Mexico. "

This program has become very famous, because unlike other programs, it is divided into three parts, and the artists do not have to spend almost half a year with teachers in a school.

== Format ==
The series consisted of three phases: Blind audition, Battle phase, and Performance shows. Four judges/coaches, all noteworthy recording artists, choose teams of contestants through a blind audition process (12 members in season 1-3 & 5–7, 16 in season 4, 51 in season 8, 42 in season 9, 39 in season 10, 30 on season 11). After being acquired by TV Azteca in season 8, the show featured the Blind auditions, Knockouts, Battles and Performance Shows.

=== First Phase – The Blind Auditions ===
Each judge has the length of the auditioner's performance (about one minute) to decide if he or she wants that singer on his or her team; if two or more judges want the same singer (as happens frequently), the Singer has the final choice of coach. In the seventh season, the block button was featured where a coach could prevent another coach from getting a contestant.

=== Second Phase – The Knockouts ===
In the eighth season, the second phase was changed from the Battles to the Knockouts. In this phase three artists (two from Season 11) from the same team sing an individual song and their coach chooses the winner. The two (one from Season 11) losing artist(s) are available to 'steal' by the other three coaches.

=== Third Phase – The Battles ===
The Battles were moved to the third stage after season 8. The Battle Rounds remained the same with coaches having two of their artists battle against each other directly by singing the same song together, with the coach choosing which artist advances to the Performance Shows. The losing artist is available to 'steal' by the other three coaches.

=== Fourth Phase – The Performance Shows ===
In the Performance Shows, each artist competes to receive their coach's and public's vote. The artists with the highest votes from their team advance to the next round. This repeats throughout the show until the Finale, where one artist per team is voted as the Top 4. In the Finale, the highest voted artist wins the title as their country's The Voice, along with their coach.

== Coaches and hosts ==
The show premiered on 11 September 2011, with Espinoza Paz, Alejandro Sanz, Lucero, Aleks Syntek as coaches and Mark Tacher as host. For season two, Jacqueline Bracamontes was announced as the replacement of Tacher. Jenni Rivera, Miguel Bosé, Paulina Rubio, and Beto Cuevas were announced as coaches. In August 2013, it was announced that Marco Antonio Solís, Alejandra Guzmán, David Bisbal and Wisin & Yandel would be the coaches in the third season. For the fourth season, Yuri, Julión Álvarez, Laura Pausini and Ricky Martin took over the coaching panel. For season five, after a three-season absence, Sanz returned as a coach alongside new coaches Gloria Trevi, J Balvin, and a double chair for the frontmen of Los Tigres del Norte. For the sixth season, Pausini and Yuri returned after a one-season absence joined by Maluma and Carlos Vives which premiered on 15 October 2017. After five seasons as host, Bracamontes moved to Spanish-language network Telemundo leaving the presenter role to YouTube figure Lele Pons for season seven. Maluma was announced to return for his second season, and was joined by new coaches Anitta, Carlos Rivera, and Natalia Jiménez.

In December 2018, TV Azteca acquired the show's rights. The first coach confirmed was Belinda, followed by Yahir, Ricardo Montaner and Lupillo Rivera. Season eight premiered on 13 March 2019, on the new channel with Jimena Peréz as host. On January 21, 2020, it was announced that Belinda and Montaner would be joined by María José and Christian Nodal to coach the participants in season nine. A month later, Eddy Vilard and Sofía Aragón were confirmed as new hosts, replacing Jimena Peréz. Filming for the tenth season started in February 2021, revealing María José as the only coach returning, alongside Miguel Bosé who coached in season two, and debuting coaches, Edith Márquez, and Jesús Navarro. Filming for season eleven began April 2022, revealing the return of David Bisbal since coaching in season three, alongside Yuridia, Ha*Ash, and Joss Favela.

=== Coaches ===
Seasons
Coach	1	2	3	4	5	6	7	8	9	10	11
Alejandro Sanz	1st place, gold medalist(s)										
Lucero											
Espinoza Paz											
Aleks Syntek											
Miguel Bosé											
Paulina Rubio											
Beto Cuevas											
Jenni Rivera		1st place, gold medalist(s)									
Wisin & Yandel											
Alejandra Guzmán											
Marco Antonio Solís			1st place, gold medalist(s)								
David Bisbal											
Ricky Martin											
Laura Pausini						1st place, gold medalist(s)					
Julión Álvarez				1st place, gold medalist(s)							
Yuri											
Los Tigres del Norte											
Gloria Trevi											
J Balvin					1st place, gold medalist(s)						
Maluma											
Carlos Vives											
Anitta											
Carlos Rivera							1st place, gold medalist(s)				
Natalia Jiménez											
Ricardo Montaner											
Yahir											
Belinda											
Lupillo Rivera								1st place, gold medalist(s)			
María José											
Christian Nodal									1st place, gold medalist(s)		
Edith Márquez										1st place, gold medalist(s)	
Jesús Navarro											
Yuridia											1st place, gold medalist(s)
Ha*Ash											
Joss Favela											

==== Line-up of coaches ====
Coaches' line-up by chairs order
Season	Year	Coaches			
Season	Year	1	2	3	4
1	2011	Syntek	Espinoza	Lucero	Alejandro
2	2012	Jenni	Beto	Paulina	Miguel
3	2013	David	Marco	Alejandra	Wisin & Yandel
4	2014	Yuri	Julión	Laura	Ricky
5	2016	Balvin	Gloria	Tigres	Alejandro
6	2017	Yuri	Vives	Laura	Maluma
7	2018	Natalia	Carlos	Anitta	Maluma
8	2019	Lupillo	Belinda	Yahir	Ricardo
9	2020	Ricardo	Belinda	María José	Christian
10	2021	María José	Miguel	Edith	Jesús
11	2022	David	Yuridia	Ha*Ash	Joss
12	2026	Pepe	María José	Thalía	Miguel
13	2027	Fonsi	Jennifer	Yatra	María José
14	2028	Marc	Danna	Mau & Ricky	Ricardo

Current coaches

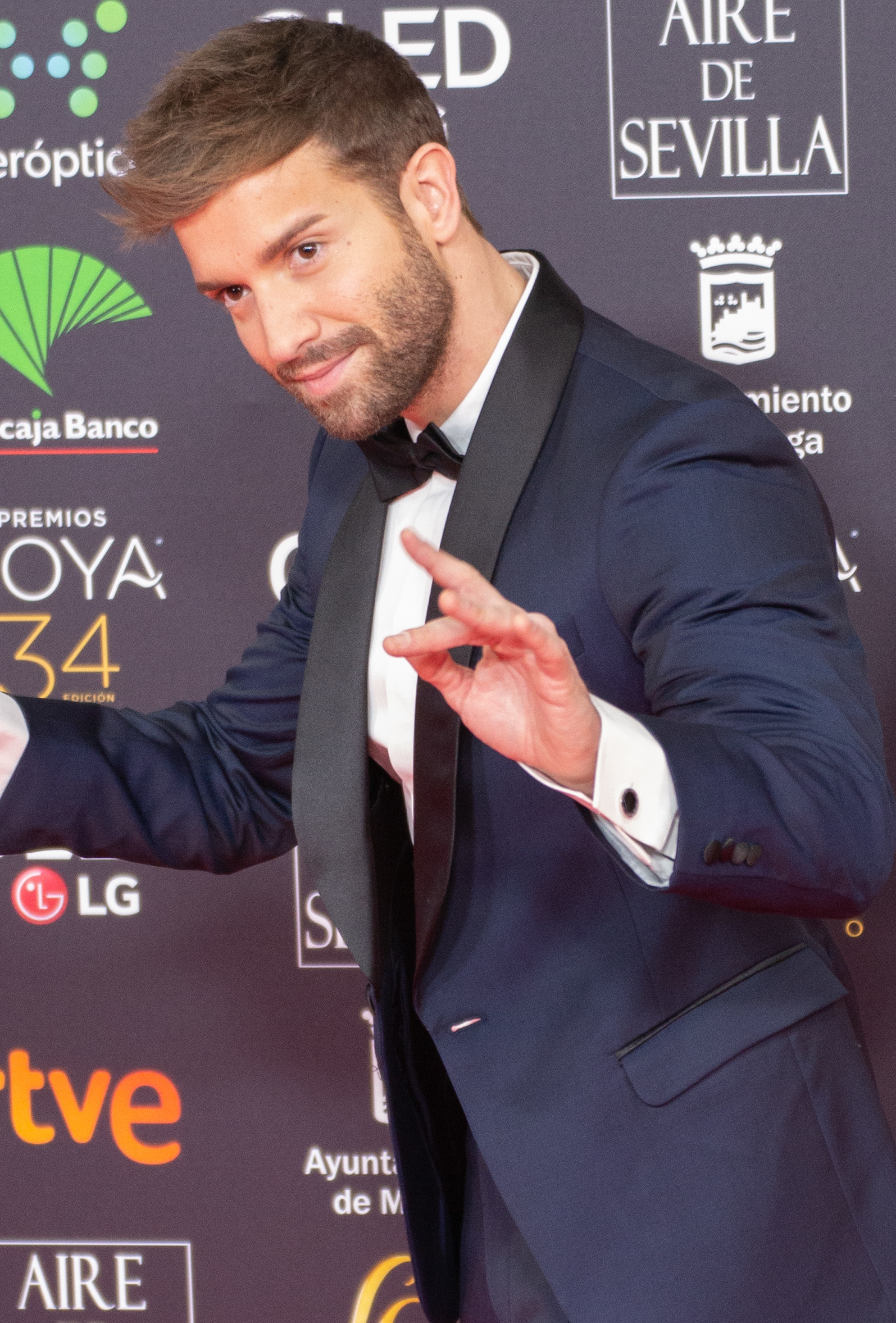
Pablo Alborán ( Upcoming 12 )

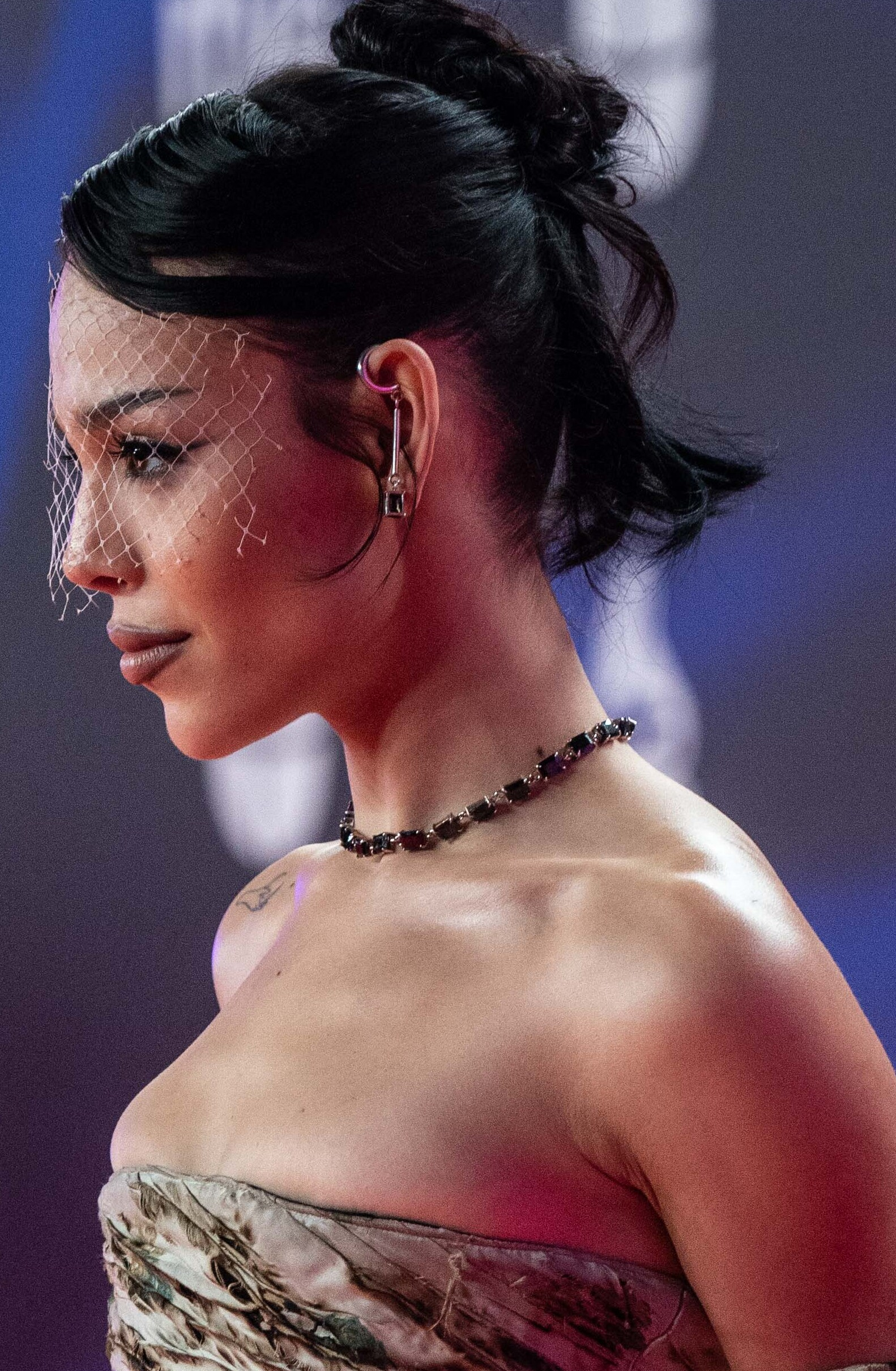
Danna Paola ( Upcoming 12 )

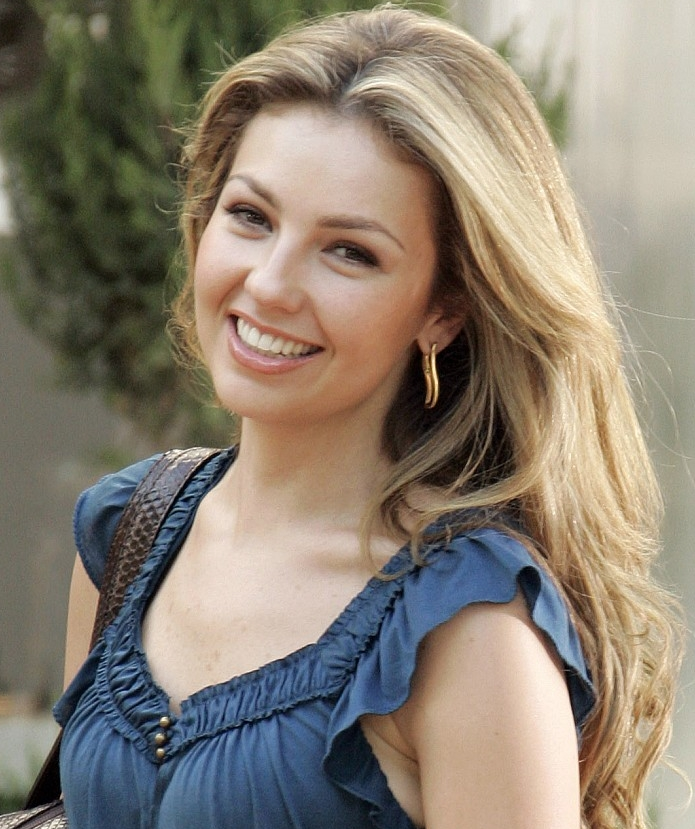
Thalía ( Upcoming 12 )

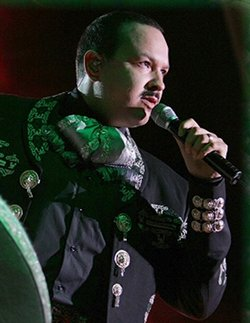
Pepe Aguilar ( Upcoming 12 )
Former coaches

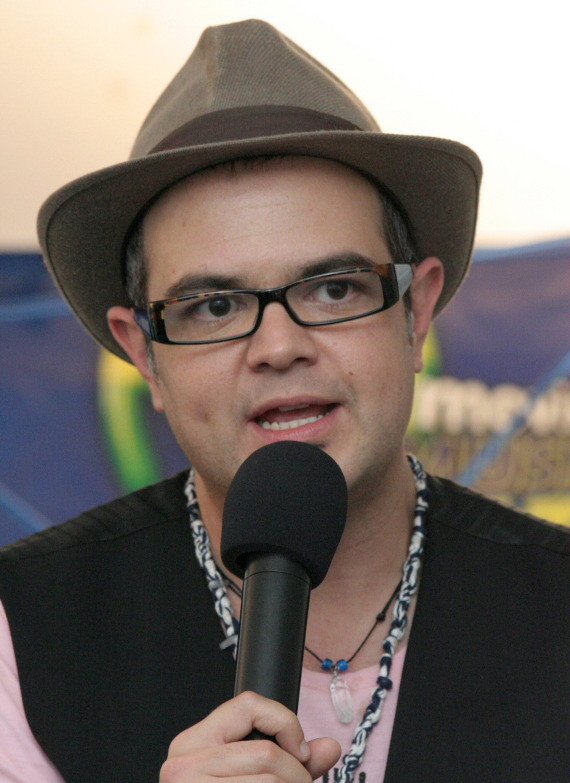
Aleks Syntek ( 1 )

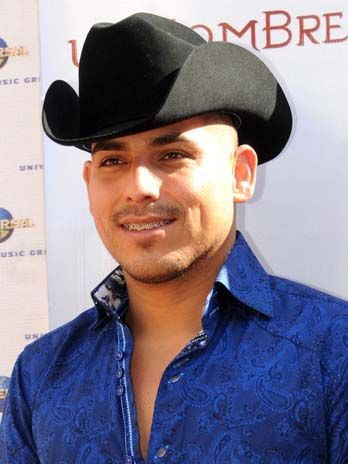
Espinoza Paz ( 1 )

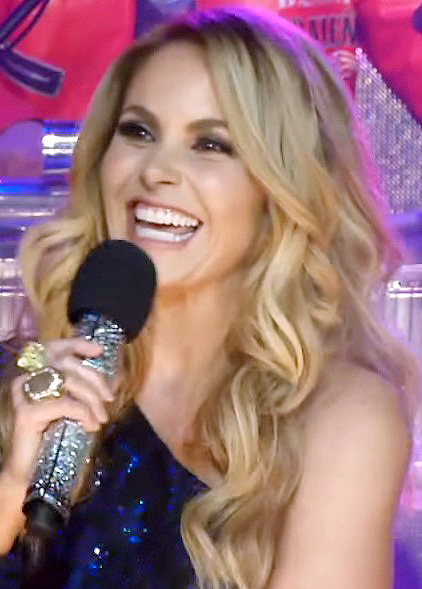
Lucero ( 1 )

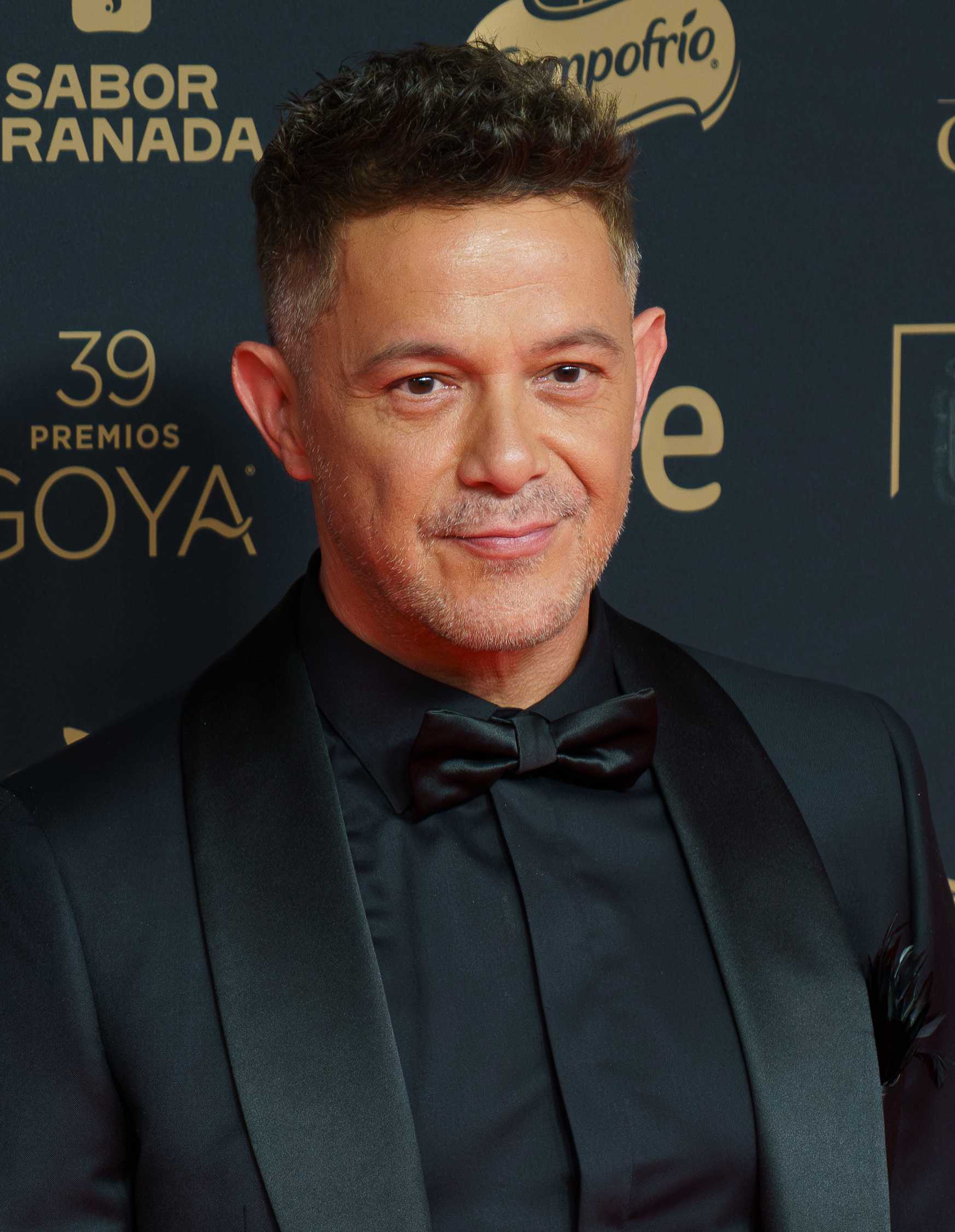
Alejandro Sanz ( 1, 5 )

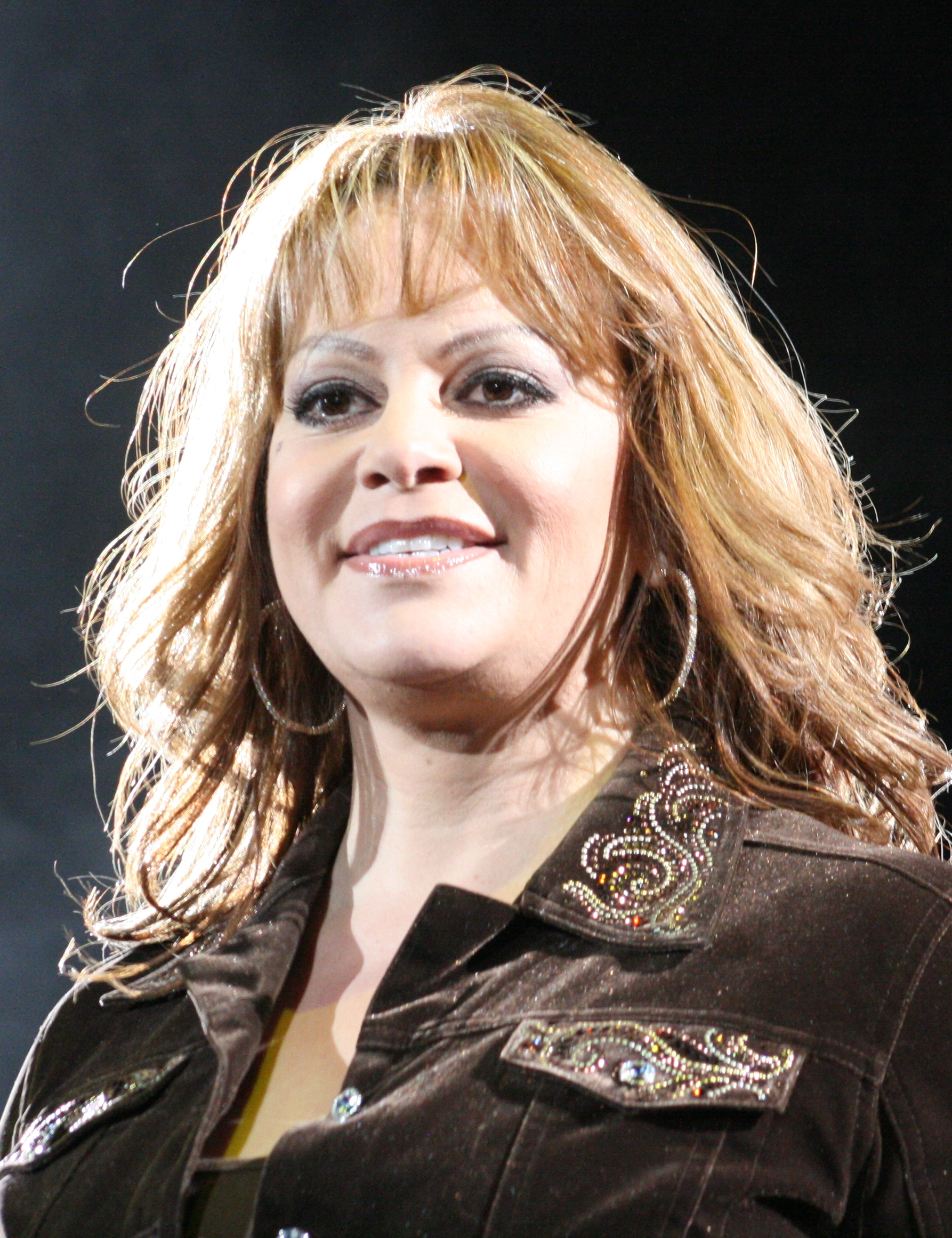
Jenni Rivera ( 2 )

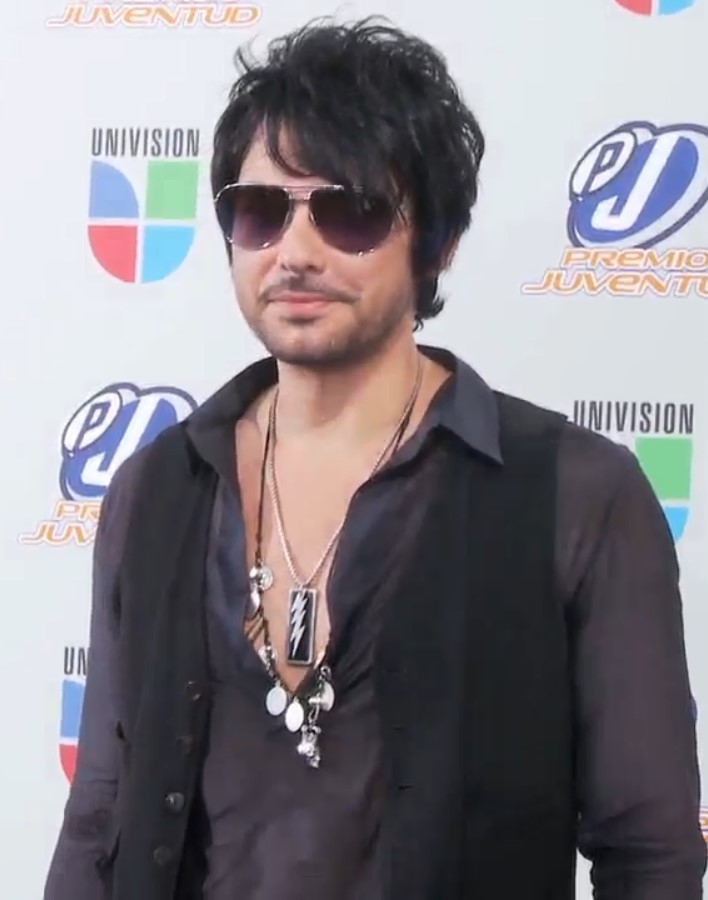
Beto Cuevas ( 2 )

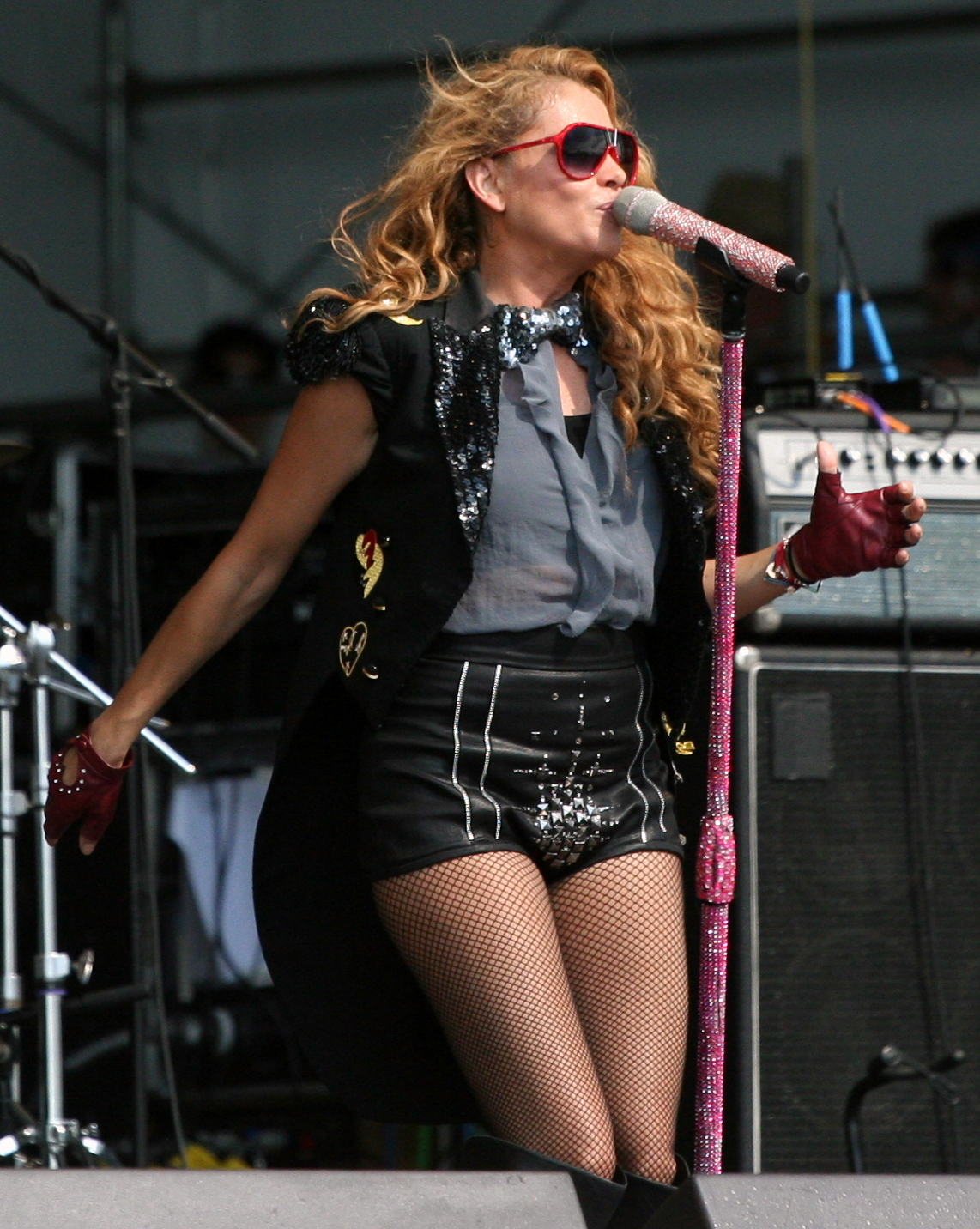
Paulina Rubio ( 2 )

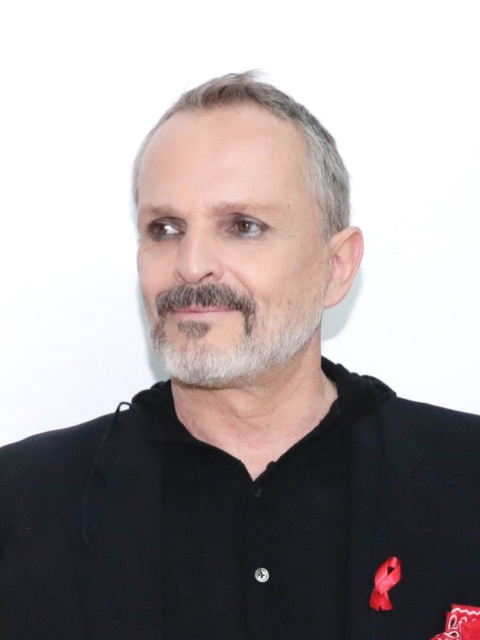
Miguel Bosé ( 2, 10 )

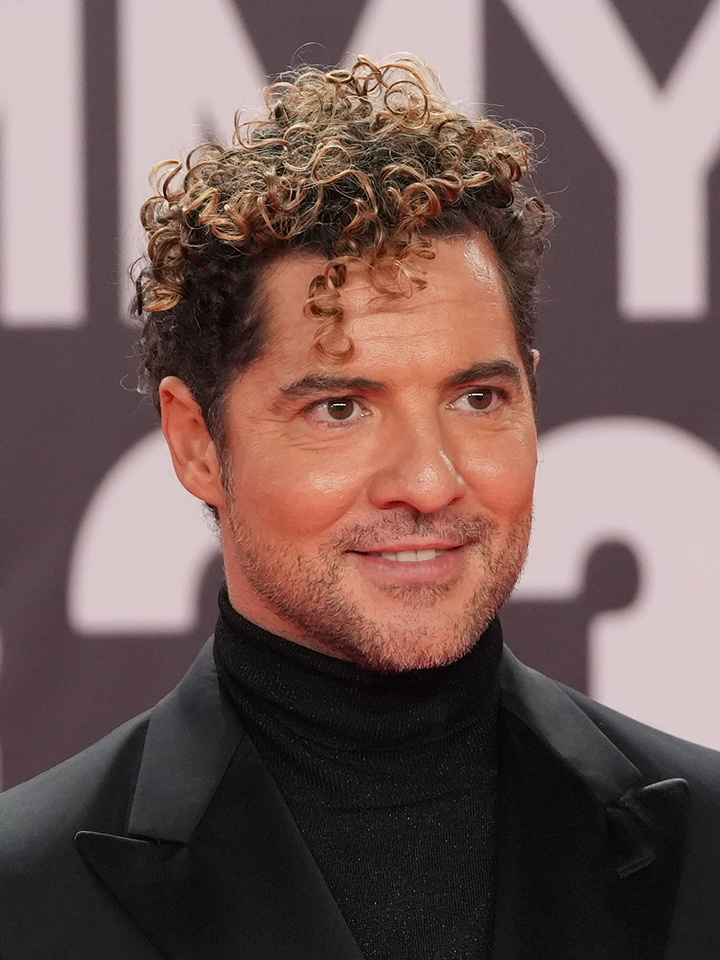
David Bisbal ( 3, 11 )

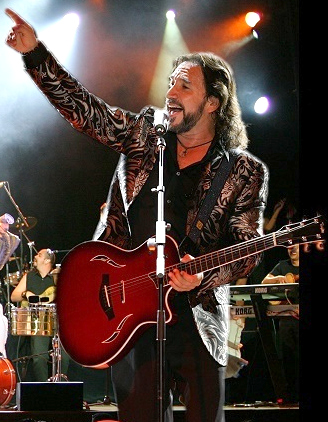
Marco Antonio Solís ( 3 )

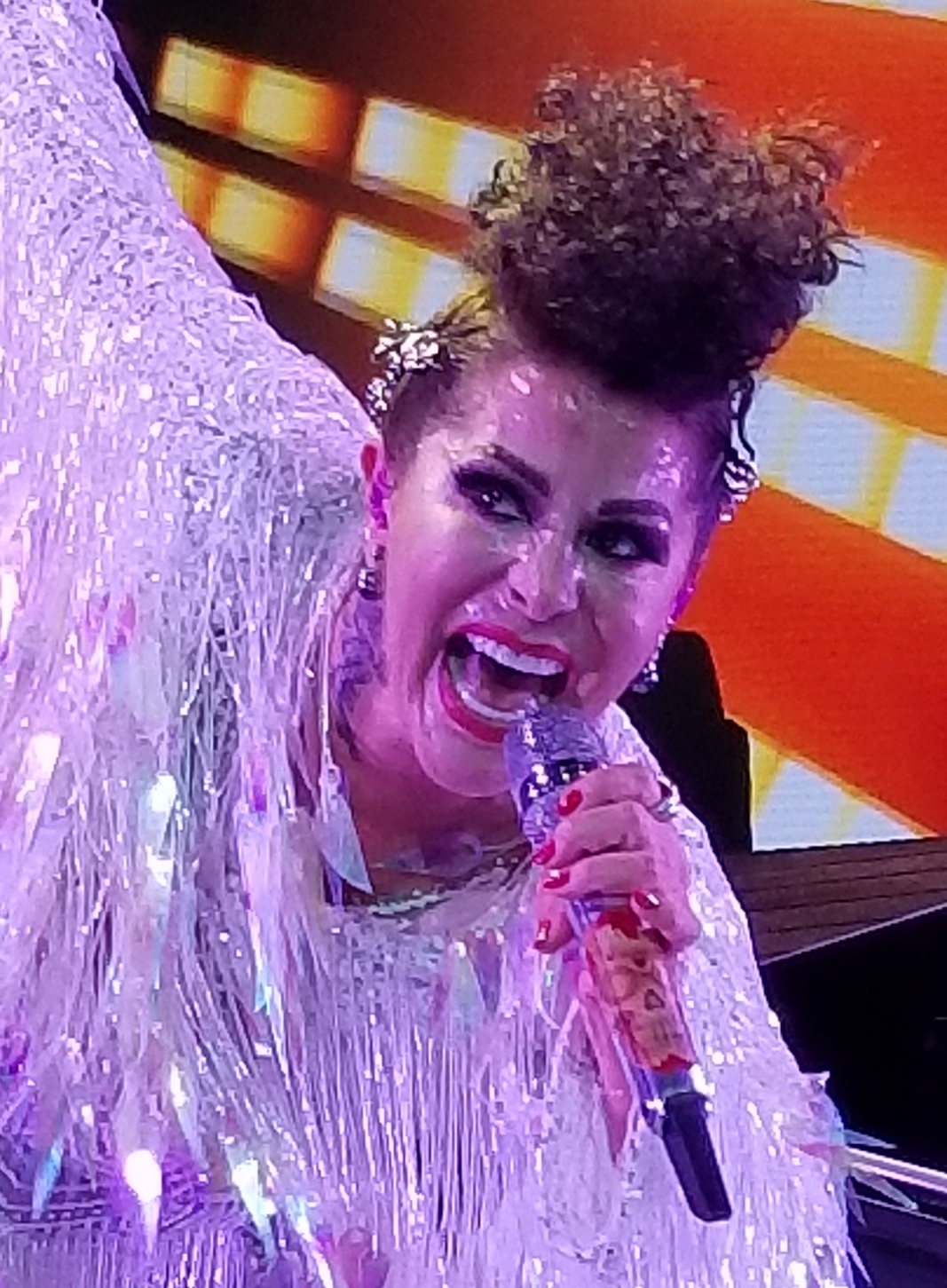
Alejandra Guzmán ( 3 )

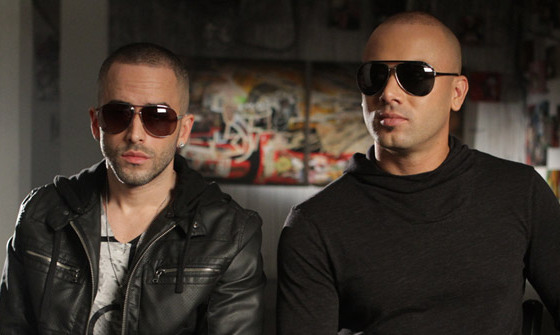
Wisin & Yandel ( duo, 3 )

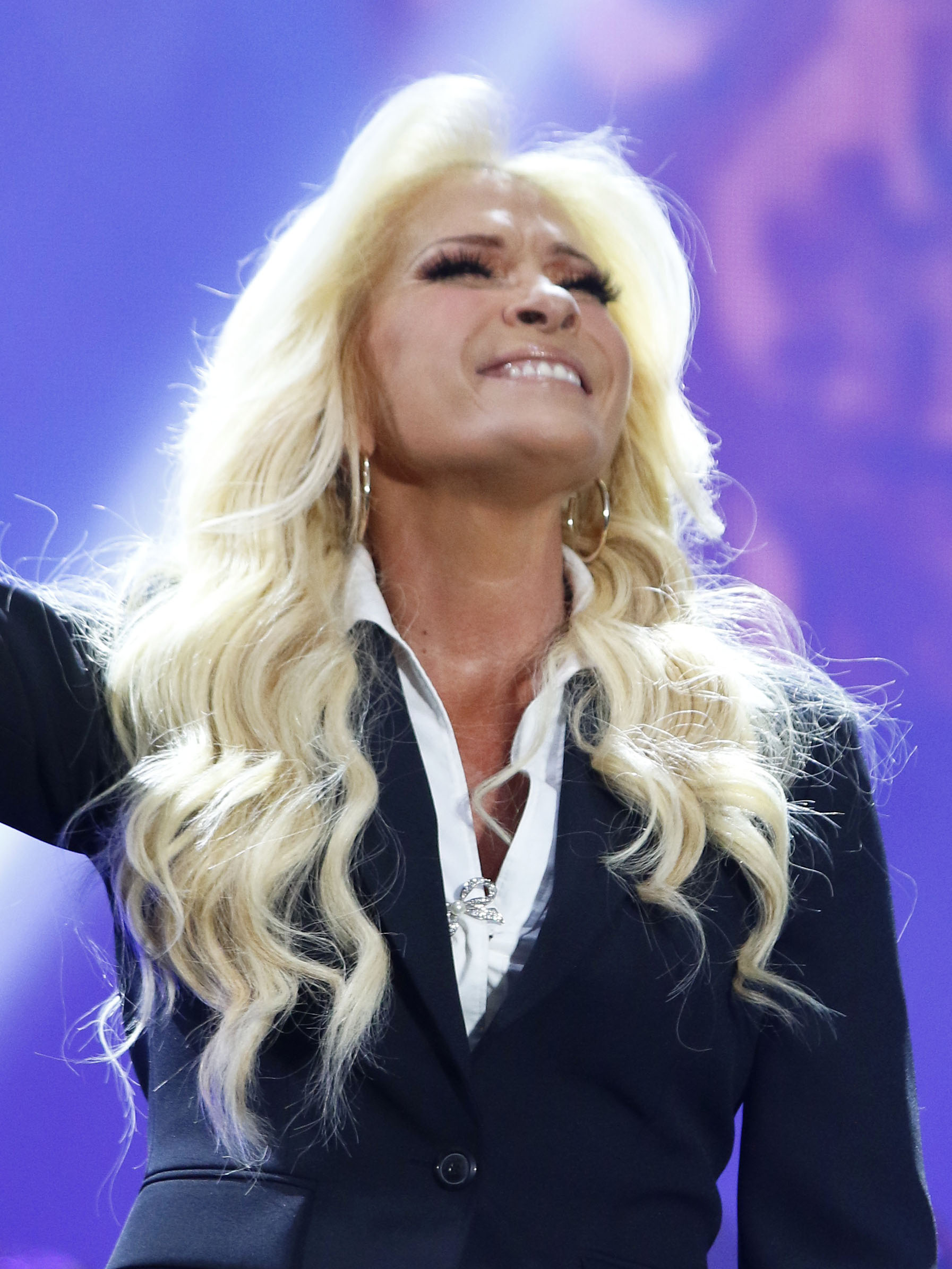
Yuri ( 4, 6 )

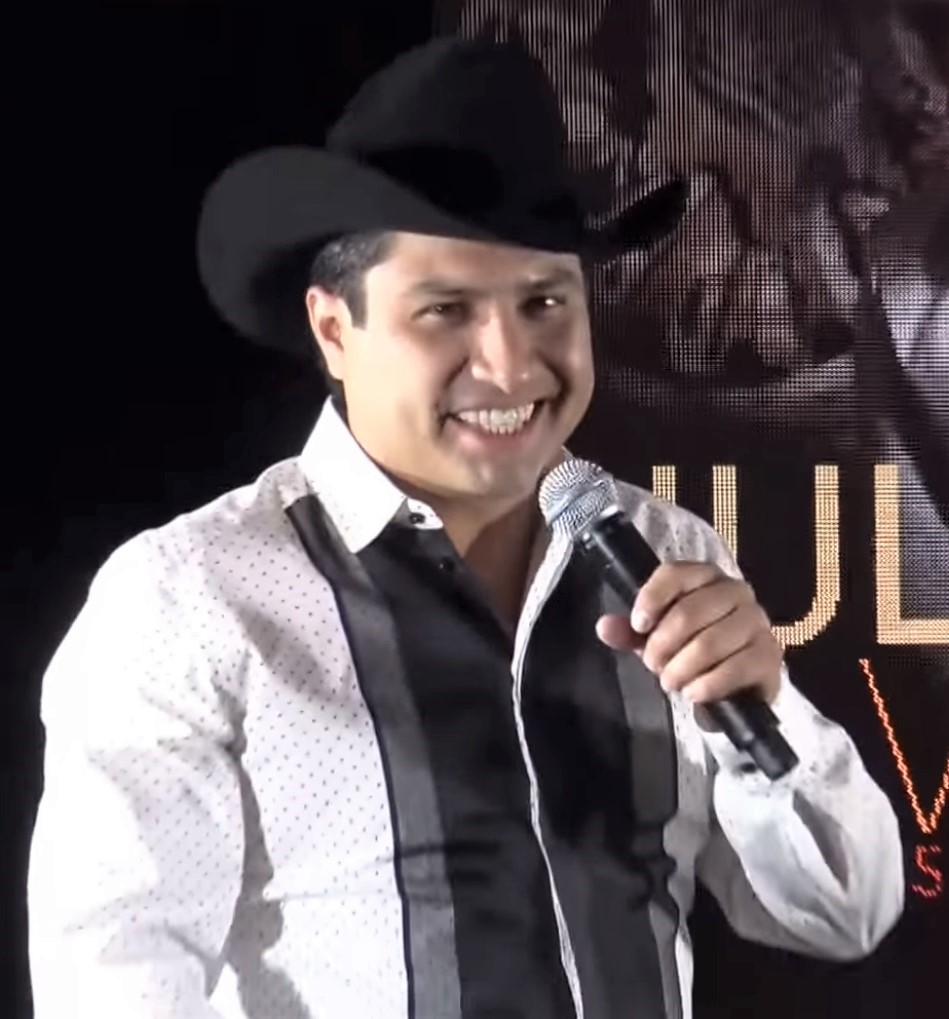
Julión Álvarez ( 4 )

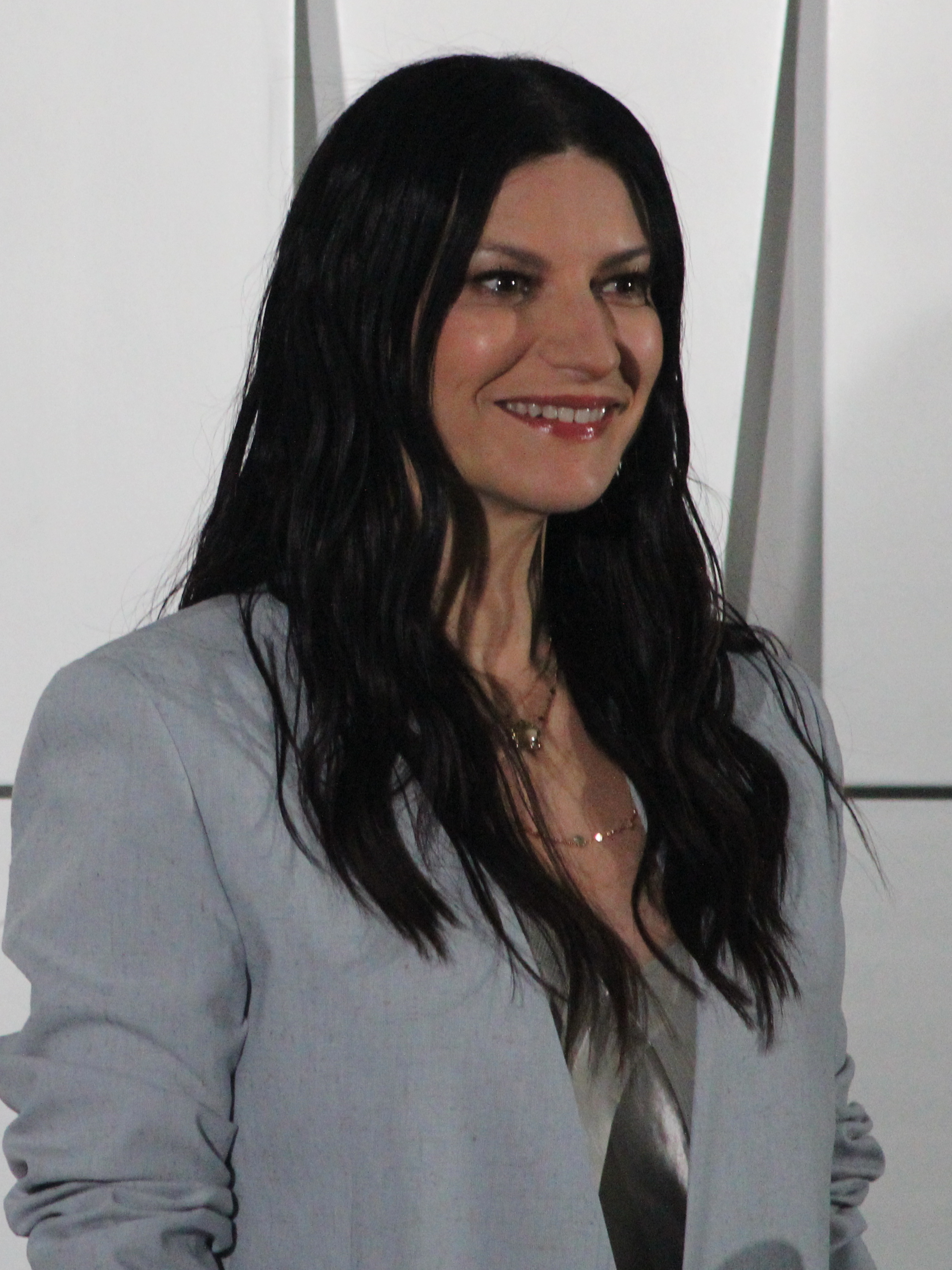
Laura Pausini ( 4, 6 )

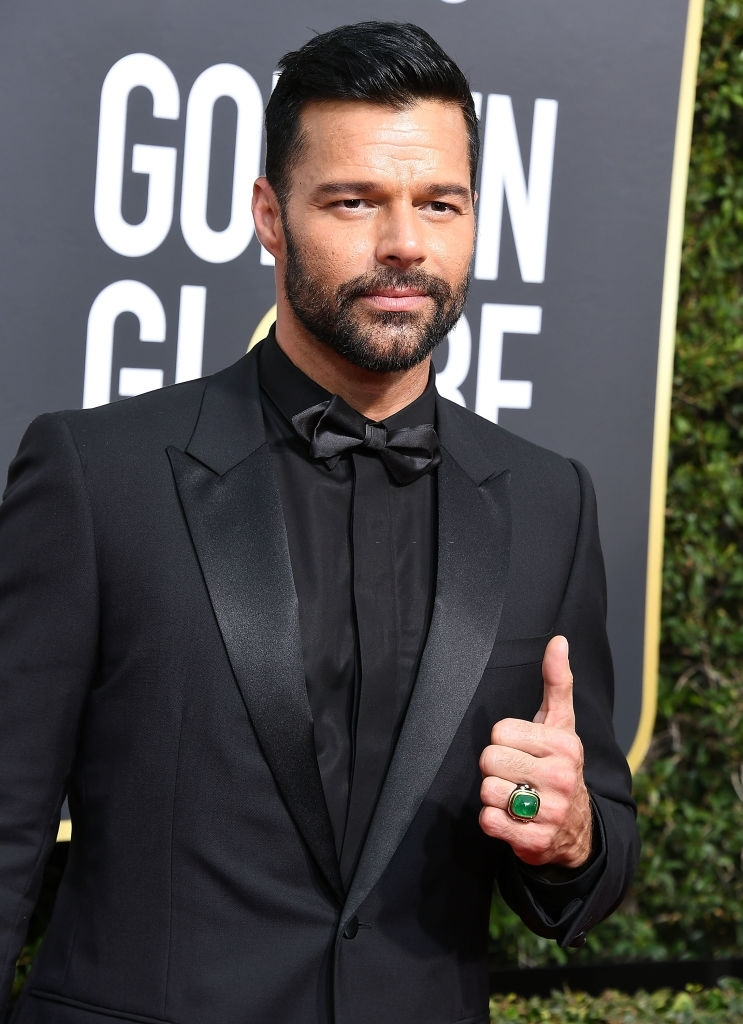
Ricky Martin ( 4 )

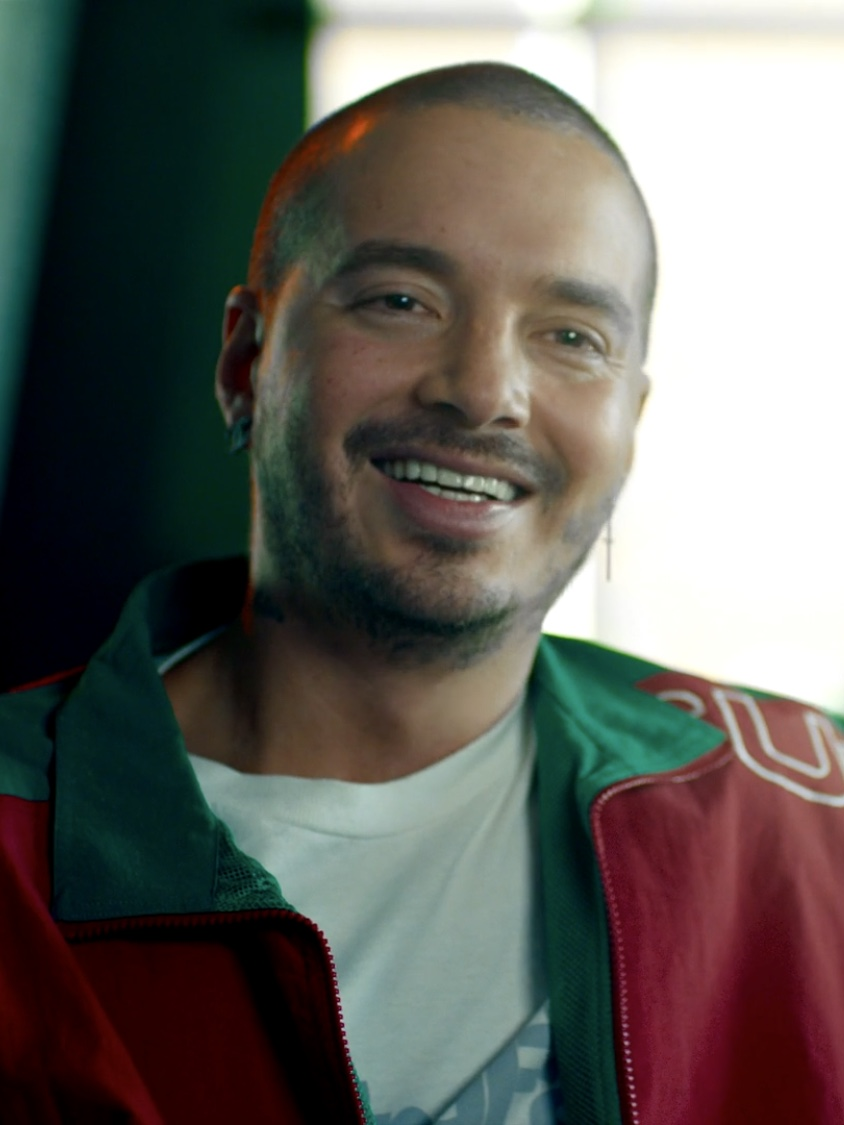
J Balvin ( 5 )

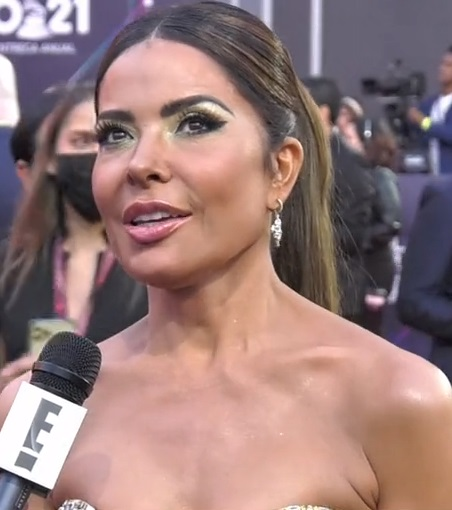
Gloria Trevi ( 5 )

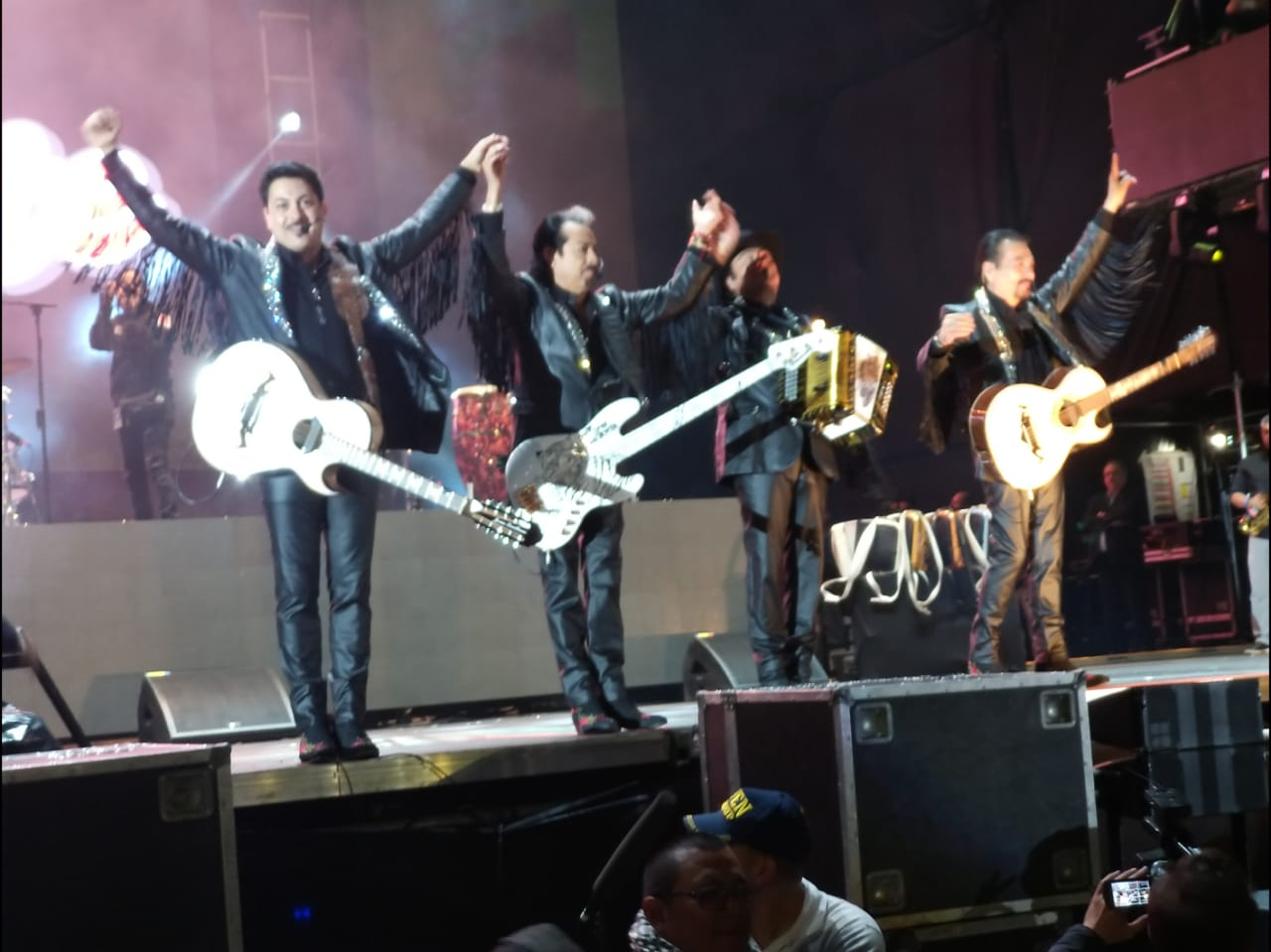
Los Tigres del Norte ( 5 )

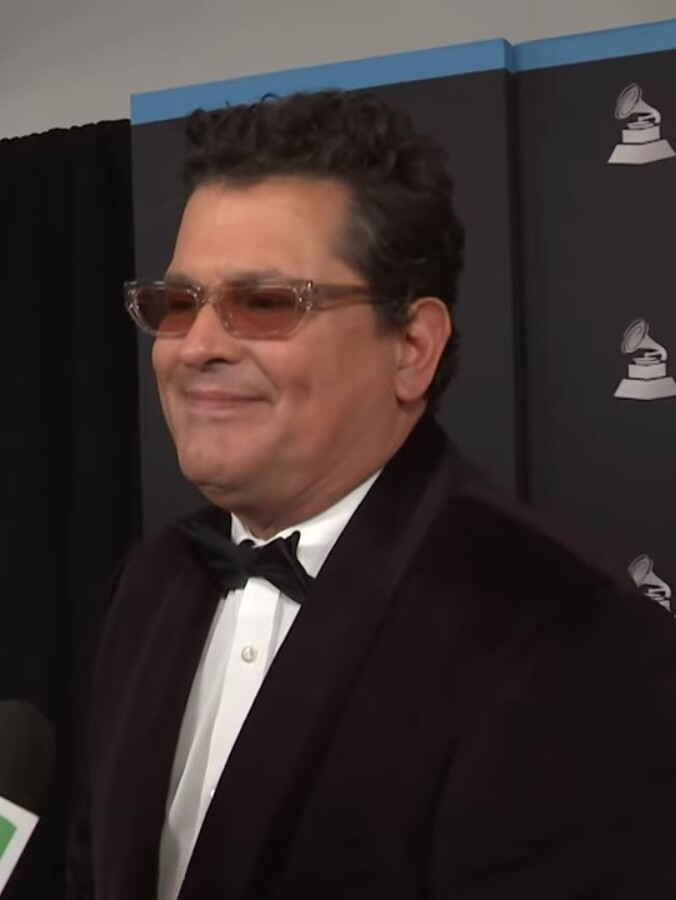
Carlos Vives ( 6 )

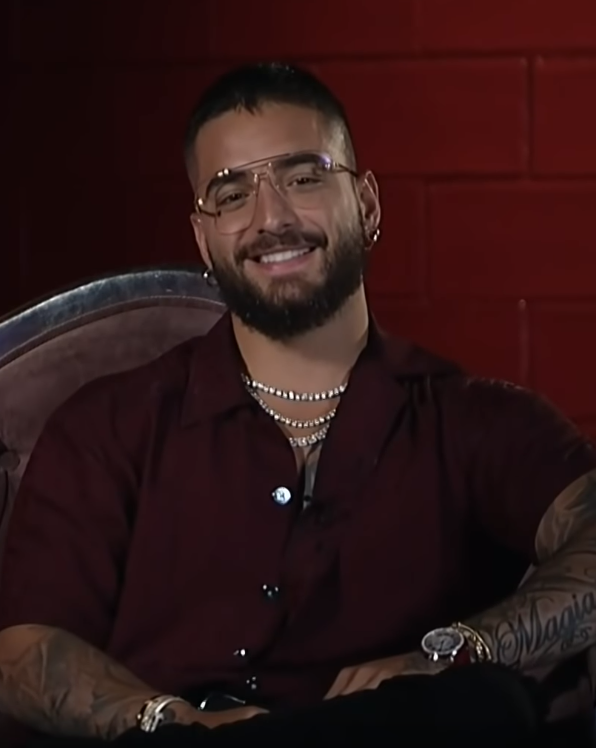
Maluma ( 6 - 7 )

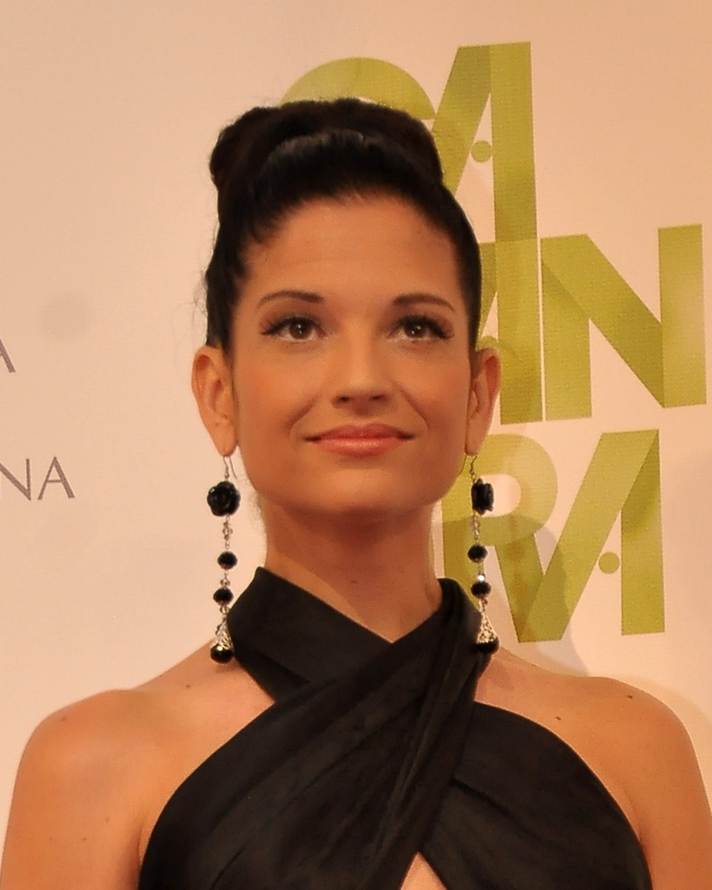
Natalia Jiménez ( 7 )

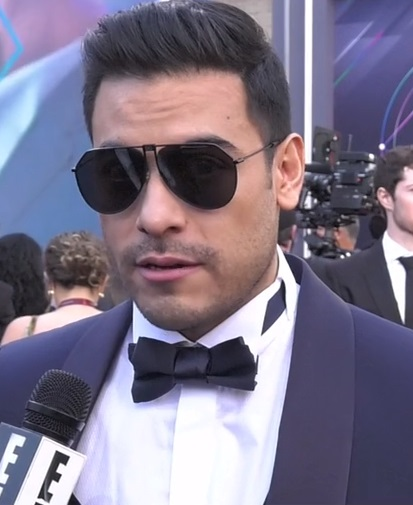
Carlos Rivera ( 7 )

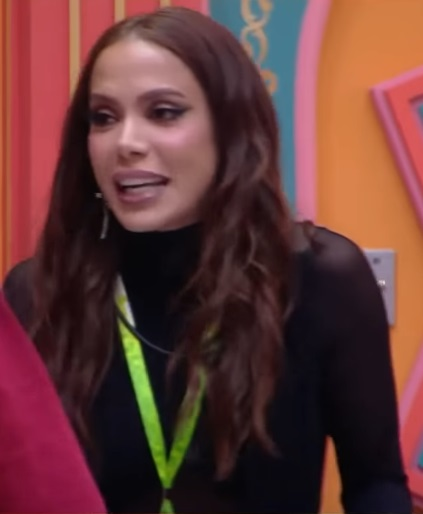
Anitta ( 7 )

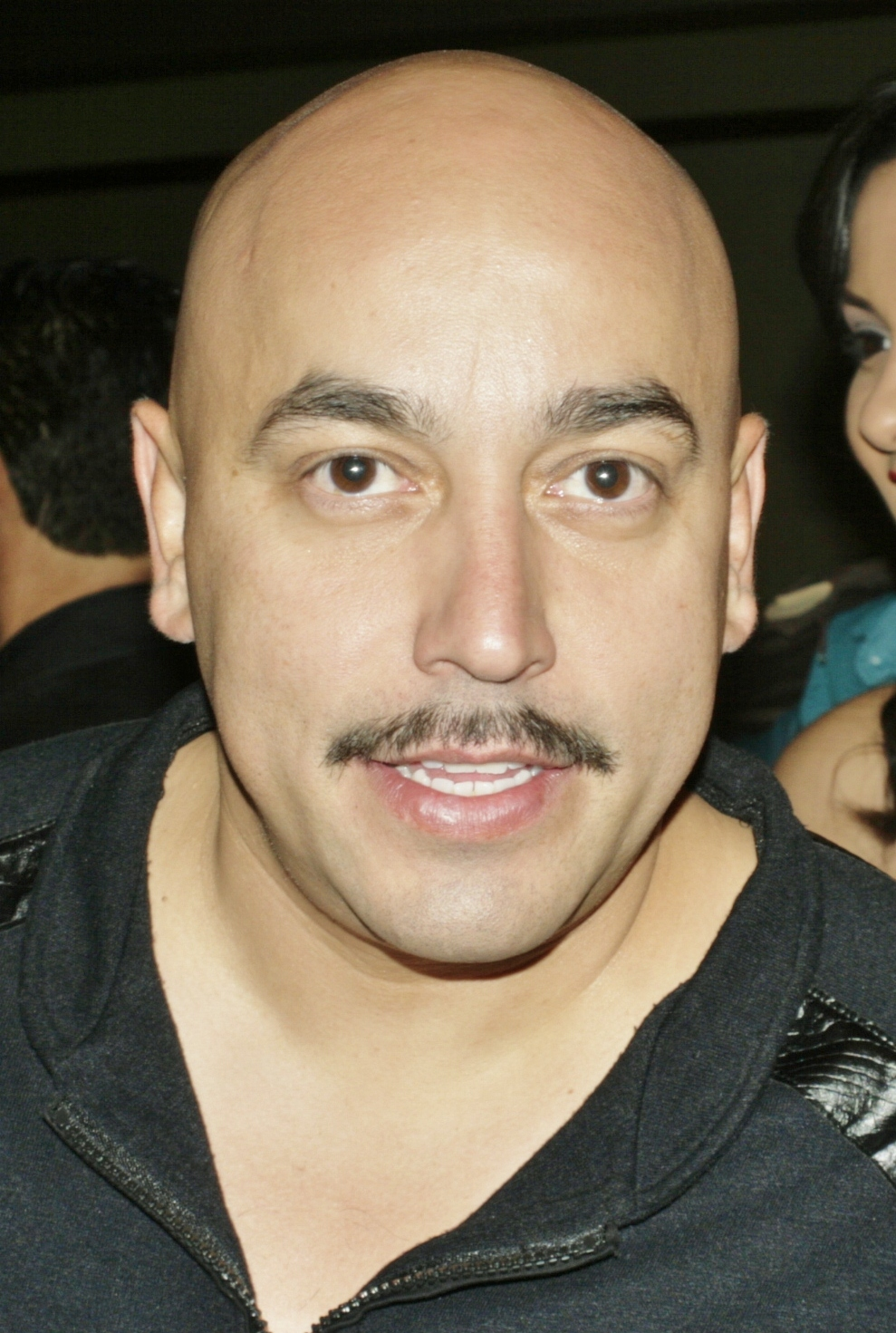
Lupillo Rivera ( 8 )

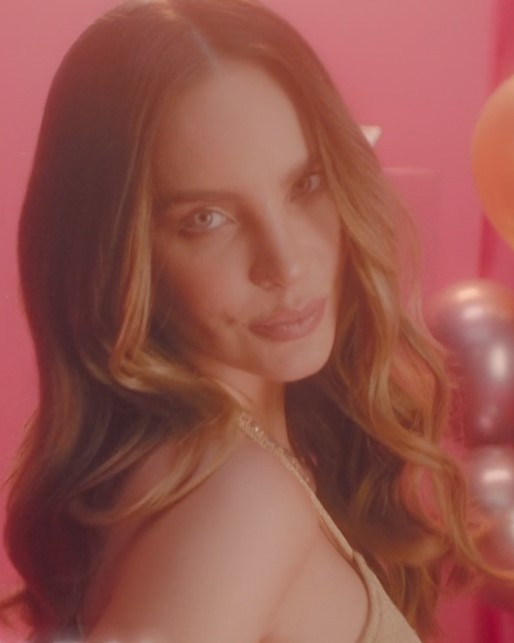
Belinda ( 8 - 9 )

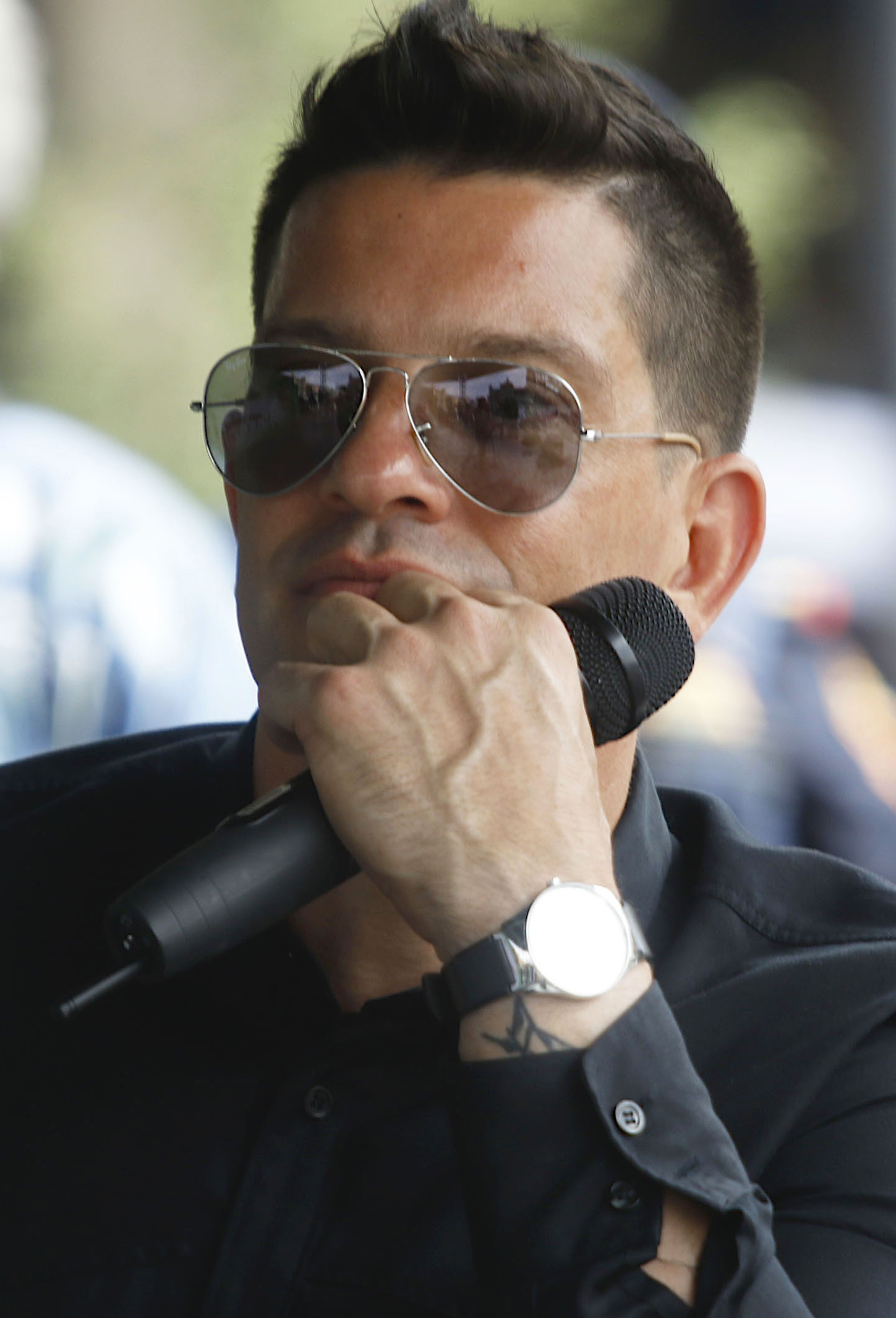
Yahir ( 8 )

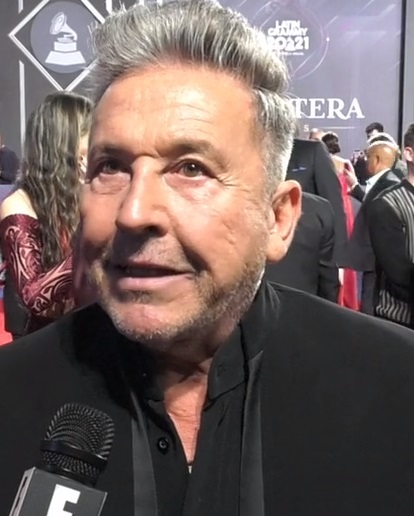
Ricardo Montaner ( 8 - 9 )

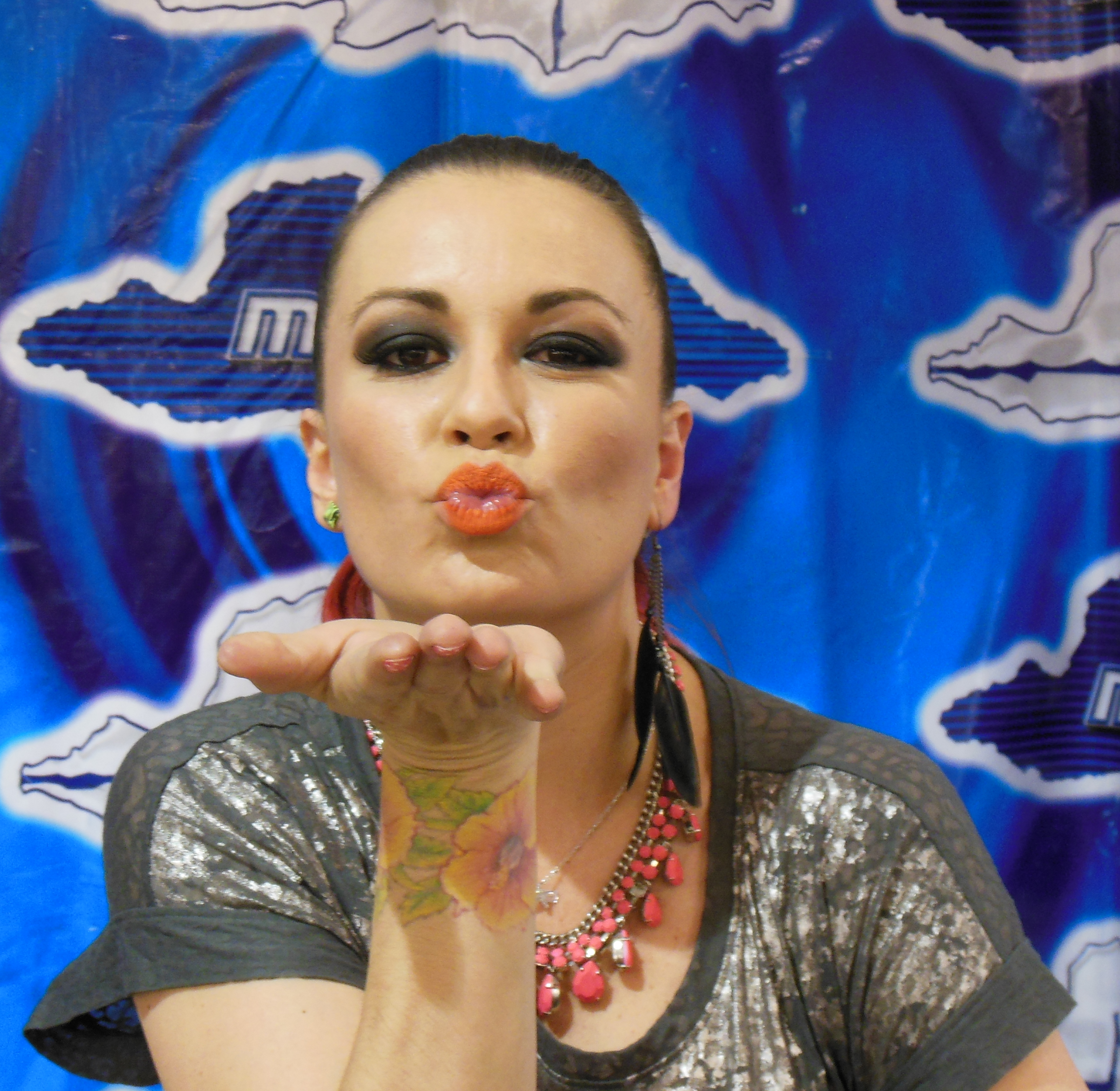
María José ( 9 - 10 )

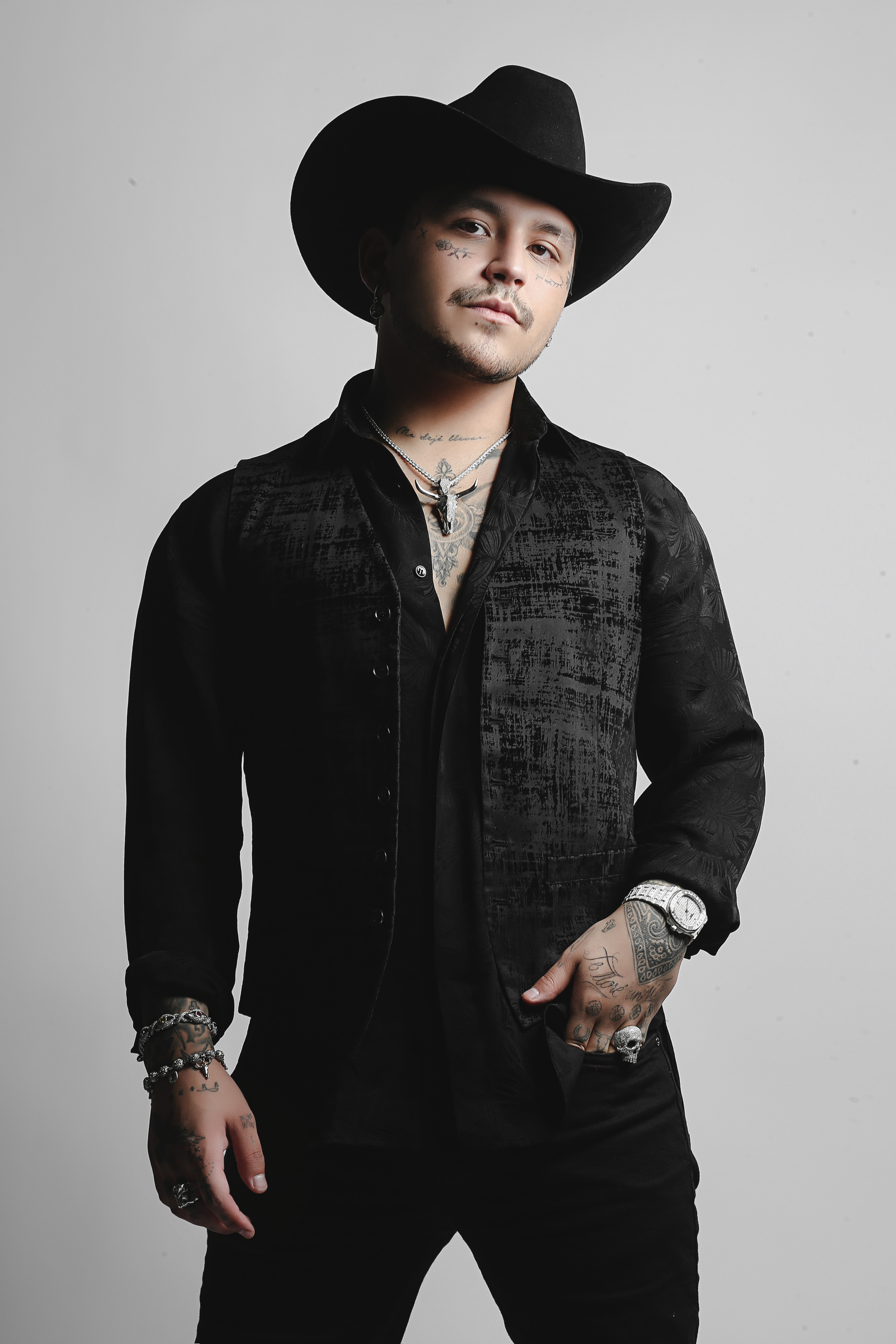
Christian Nodal ( 9 )

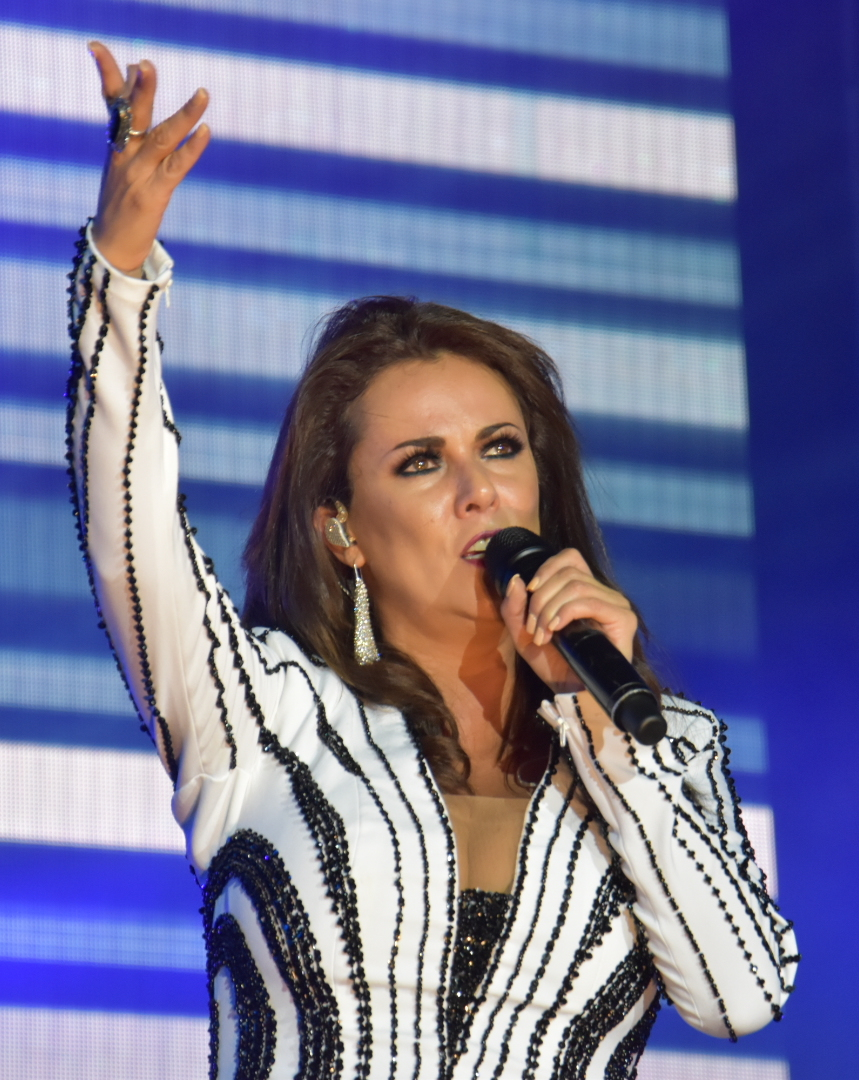
Edith Márquez ( 10 )

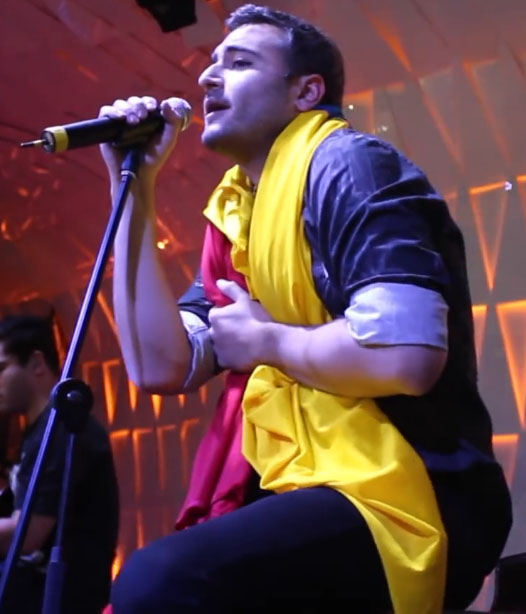
Jesús Navarro ( 10 )

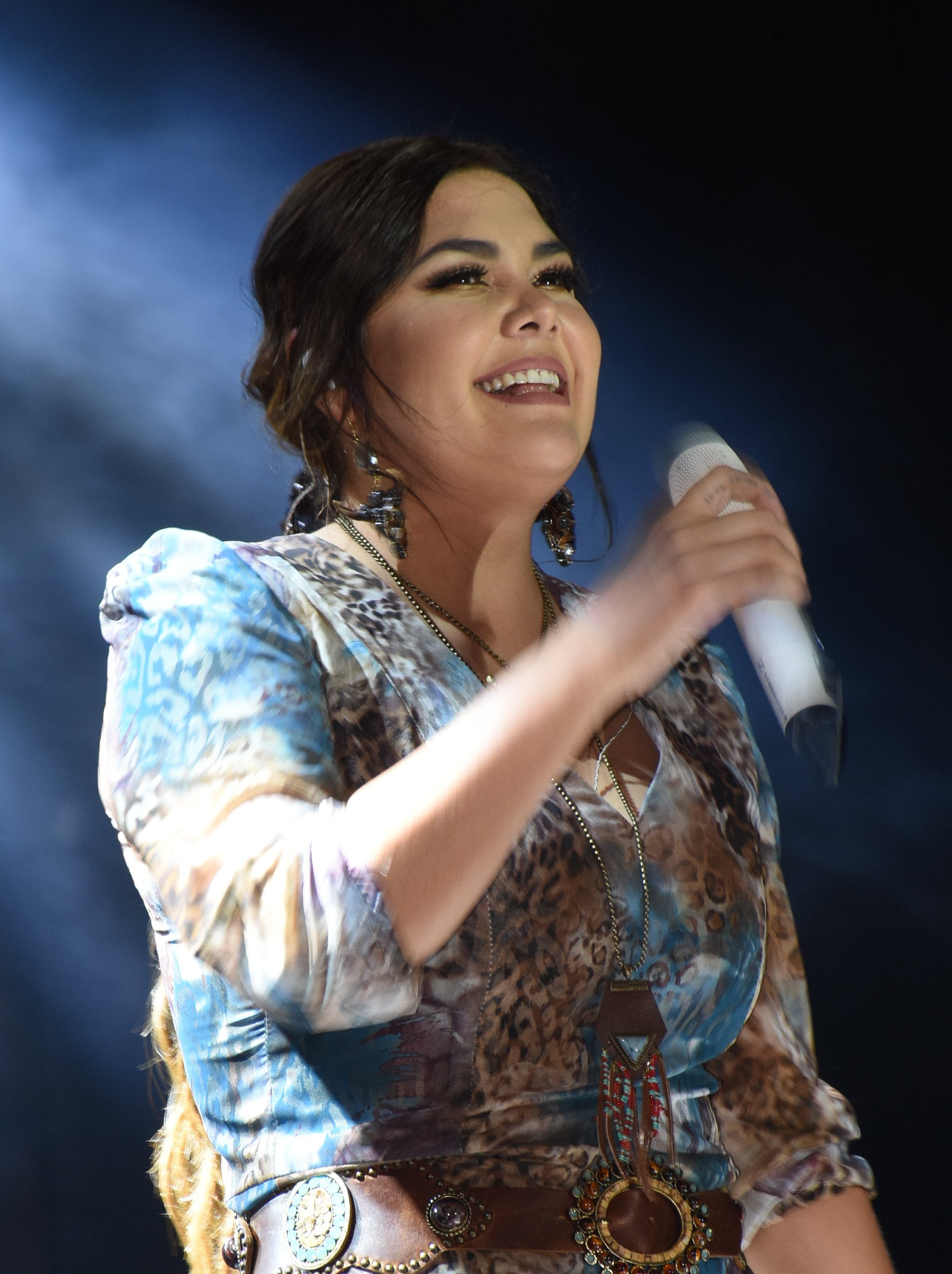
Yuridia ( 11 )

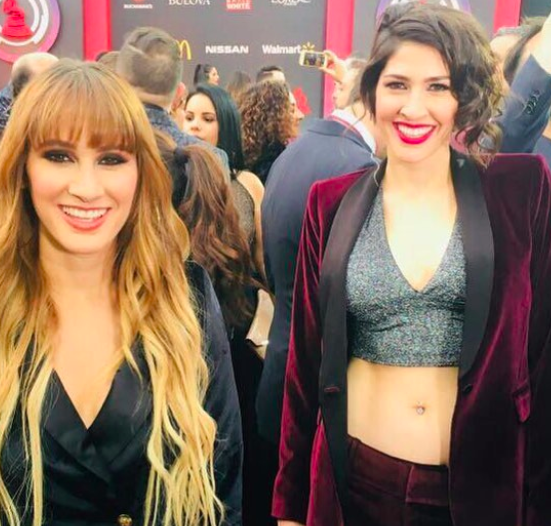
Ha*Ash ( 11 )

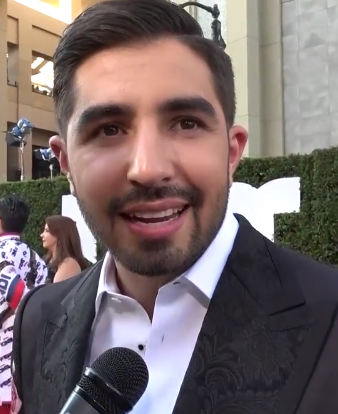
Joss Favela ( 11 )

== Coaches' teams ==
– Winning coach and contestant. Winners are in bold.
– Runner-up coach and contestant. Final contestant first listed.
– 3rd place coach and contestant. Final contestant first listed.
– 4th place coach and contestant. Final contestant first listed.
† - Coach/Contestant is deceased

Season	Coaches			
1	Aleks Syntek	Espinoza Paz	Lucero	Alejandro Sanz
1	**Oscar Garrido**; Marian & Mariel Santos; Andrea Araujo; Paulina Aguilera; Alondra Vilchis; Daphne Gutiérrez	**Alejandra Orozco**; Lluvia Ayala; Ramiro Benavidez; Daniel Inurreta; Uziel & Zuriel Ramírez; Ana Carla Sinclair	**Gabriel Navarro**; Fernando Serafin; Vivian Rodriguez; Lucero Antonio; Javier Robledo; Jano Fuentes †	**Oscar Cruz**; Damiana Conde; Polo Rojas; Jass Reyes; Sergio García; Melissa Menéndez
2	Jenni Rivera †	Beto Cuevas	Paulina Rubio	Miguel Bosé
2	**Luz María Ramírez**; Ricardo Yocupicio; Diana Laura Gascón; Sandra Rodríguez; Rubén Renné García; Raúl Partida & Raúl Partida Jr.; Miguel Ángel Patiño; Jana Ruz	**Ximena Villalón**; Fernando Irigoyen; Perla Mondragón; Federico Vega; Javier Minjarez; Isaac Ruíz; Ana Karen Aboytes; Rigoberto Gutiérrez	**Gerardo Bazúa**; Gerardo Demara; Yosigey Vergara; Roberto Carlos Cerda; Jorge Romano; Keren Shy; Gabriela Espinosa; Gabriel Ornelas	**Miguel & Alejandro Pérez**; José Ignacio Martínez; Mike Sierra; Jovanko Ibarra; Noam Tuchmam; Rocío Jaramillo; Luís Javier Duhart; René Torash
3	David Bisbal	Marco Antonio Solís	Alejandra Guzmán	Wisin & Yandel
3	**Willy Espinoza**; Jessy Miranda; Samantha Rae; Azael García	**Marcos Razo**; **Kate Botello**; Marcela Aguilar; Hector Villareal	**Carolina Ross**; Rodrigo Estrada; Valentino Dávalos; América Estamates	Kerem Santoyo; Aby Espinoza; Santiago Ogarrio; Oliver Ahucid; Gibrán Martiz(+)
4	Yuri	Julión Álvarez	Laura Pausini	Ricky Martin
4	**Natalia Sosa**; Frank DI; Joel Espinoza; Marcela Galvez; Lisbeth † & Lizeth	**Guido Rochin**; Iliana Beilis; Juan Carlos & José Manuel; Mike Miramontes; Daniela Pedali	**Kike Jiménez**; Jonathan Becerra; Saak Figueroa; Melissa Galindo; Ayness López	**Agina Álvarez**; Sarah & Joe; Alejandro Blumerkron; Alex Hoyer; Mitsuo Yokishi
5	J Balvin	Gloria Trevi	Los Tigres del Norte	Alejandro Sanz
5	**Yuliana Martínez**; **Jorge Eduardo**; Valentina Batta; Monse Limongi; Faustino & Tito Villalobos	**Eddy Ray**; Jose Talamantes; Sofía Elena; Karina Ambriz; Anuar	**Poncho Arocha**; Giovana Taboada; María Jimena; Marco & Rick; Alba & Belén Arellano	Kike García; Melissa Jiménez; Manu Negrete & Lucho Aguilera; Gil Bokacho; Jimena Villareal
6	Yuri	Carlos Vives	Laura Pausini	Maluma
6	**Leslie Mar**; Bubba Barsant; Lizeth González; Alex Rodríguez; Julio Adrián Adame	**Mayela Orozco**; Thalía Ramírez; Lu Infante; Diana Laura Gascón; Flor Amargo	**Luis Adrián Cruz**; Johan Sotelo; Stefano Marocco; Marian & Mariel Santos; Erika Peña	**Irlanda Valenzuela**; Ryan González; Gaby Albo; Fernando Irigoyen; Hugo Márquez
7	Natalia Jiménez	Carlos Rivera	Anitta	Maluma
7	**Carmen Goett**; Adriana & Cristian; Maggy Aranda; Cindy Coleoni; Anthon Mor; Norah Montero; Luis Ochoa; Rosa Michell	**Cristina Ramos**; Guillermo Mendoza; Aneeka; Mad Rapsodia; Dulce Najar; Gabby Tamez; Rey Cristopher; Ale Ramírez	**Delian**; Ángel Elizondo; Mafer Labastida; Morganna Love; Luanna Silva; Jesús De la Rosa; Colette Acuña; Diana Campos	**Diana Villamonte**; Ley Memphis; Erika Alcocer; Paola Guanche; Francisco Treviño; Nacho Pérez; Ariel Vi; José Dhalí
8	Lupillo Rivera	Belinda	Yahir	Ricardo Montaner
8	**Fátima Domínguez**; José de Jesús "Pichi"; Miguel Rivera	**Viviann Baeza**; Lucas Martín; Meli G	**Leo Rosas** †; Tenoch Niño de Rivera; Daniela González	**Mashiakh & Dara Warnero**; Sury Faría; Diana Bellini
9	Ricardo Montaner	Belinda	María José	Christian Nodal
9	**Alexis Tanguma**; Alonso Hernández; Gabby Muller	**Prudence**; Juan Ma; DYF	**Glenda Ramírez**; Majo Cornejo; Kike Jiménez	**Fernando Sujo**; Natalia Marrokin; Arnoldo Tapia
10	María José	Miguel Bosé	Edith Márquez	Jesús Navarro
10	**Arturo De La Fuente**; Melina; Ale Soto	**Kike Aristi**; Vida; Edeer Velásquez	**Sherlyn Sánchez**; Azucena Del Toro; Dugali	**Arantza**; Sumiko; Ela
11	David Bisbal	Yuridia	Ha*Ash	Joss Favela
11	**Anyelique Solorio**; Gabriel García; José María Ortega	**Fátima Elizondo**; Isabela Rodríguez; Jennifer Santos	**Marcela López**; Adrianna Foster; Brandon Parra	**Sandra Guevara**; Christian Valdés; Aeda Fernanda

== Series overview ==
La Voz series overview
Season	Aired	Winner	Runner-up	Third place	Fourth place	Winning coach	Host
1	2011	Óscar Cruz	Alejandra Orozco	Óscar Garrido	Gabriel Navarro	Alejandro Sanz	Mark Tacher
2	2012	Luz María Ramírez	Miguel & Alejandro	Gerardo Bazúa	Ximena Villalón	Jenni Rivera	Jacqueline Bracamontes
3	2013	Marcos Razo	Willy Espinoza	Carolina Ross	Kate Botello	Marco A. Solis	Jacqueline Bracamontes
4	2014	Guido Rochin	Kike Jiménez	Agina Álvarez	Natalia Sosa	Julión Álvarez	Jacqueline Bracamontes
5	2016	Yuliana Martínez	Eddy Ray	Poncho Arocha	Jorge Eduardo	J Balvin	Jacqueline Bracamontes
6	2017	Luis Adrián Cruz	Leslie Mar	Irlanda Valenzuela	Mayela Orozco	Laura Pausini	Jacqueline Bracamontes
7	2018	Cristina Ramos	Diana Villamonte	Carmen Goett	Delian	Carlos Rivera	Lele Pons
8	2019	Fátima Domínguez	Leo Rosas	Viviann Baeza	Mashiakh & Dara	Lupillo Rivera	Jimena Pérez
9	2020	Fernando Sujo	Alexis Tanguma	Glenda Ramírez	Prudence	Christian Nodal	Eddy Vilard
10	2021	Sherlyn Sánchez	Arturo De La Fuente	Arantza	Kike Aristi	Edith Márquez	Eddy Vilard
11	2022	Fátima Elizondo	Anyelique Solorio	Marcela López	Sandra Guevara	Yuridia	Eddy Vilard
12	2026						

== Seasons' summaries ==
=== Season 1 ===
Name	Age	Description	Musical style	Advisor
Alejandro Sanz	42 years old	International Star	Latin pop, Balada romántica, Pop-Rock, Flamenco, Spanish rock	Mario Domm
Espinoza Paz	30 years old	Regional Artist	Norteño, Ranchera, Banda sinaloense	David Bisbal
Aleks Syntek	42 years old	International Artist	Pop-Rock, Pop, Latin pop, Balada pop	Joy
Lucero	42 years old	International Artist	Pop, Ranchera, Baladas en español	Manuel Mijares

=== Season 2 ===
Name	Age	Description	Musical style	Advisor(s)
Jenni Rivera †	43 years old	International Star	Norteño, Ranchera, Banda sinaloense, Bachata	Espinoza Paz
Miguel Bosé	56 years old	International Star	Pop, Balada, Latin pop	Ximena Sariñana
Paulina Rubio	41 years old	International Star	Pop, Pop-Rock, Latin pop	Jesús Navarro
Beto Cuevas	45 years old	International Artist	Pop, Latin pop, Rock, Pop-Rock, Latin rock	Ha*Ash

=== Season 3 ===
Name	Age	Description	Musical style	Advisor(s)
Marco Antonio Solís	53 years old	International Star	Ranchera, Bolero, Balada, Pop, Mexican cumbia	Edith Márquez
David Bisbal	34 years old	International Star	Pop, Balada romántica, Pop latino	Paty Cantú
Alejandra Guzmán	45 years old	International Artist	Pop, Pop-Rock, Latin pop, Rock	Motel
Wisin & Yandel	34–36 years old	Urban Stars	Reggaeton, Latin trap, Urban music	Prince Royce

=== Season 4 ===
Name	Age	Description	Musical style	Advisor
Julión Álvarez	30 years old	International Artist	Ranchera, Banda sinaloense, Latin pop	Ricardo Montaner
Laura Pausini	39 years old	International Star	Pop-Rock, Balada romántica, Pop, Latin music, Europop	Alex Ubago
Ricky Martin	42 years old	International Star	Latin pop, Balada, Latin music, Bachata, Guaracha	Mario Domm
Yuri	50 years old	International Artist	Latin Pop, Balada romántica, Pop, Ranchera	Poncho Lizárraga

=== Season 5 ===
Name	Age	Description	Musical style	Advisor
J Balvin	30 years old	Urban Star	Reggaeton, Latin trap, Urban music	Julión Álvarez
Gloria Trevi	48 years old	International Artist	Latin pop, Pop-Rock, Reggaeton	Manuel Carrasco
Los Tigres del Norte	58–61 years old	International Artists	Norteño, Ranchera, Cumbia Norteña, Bolero	Diego Torres
Alejandro Sanz	47 years old	International Star	Latin pop, Balada romántica, Pop-Rock, Flamenco, Spanish rock	Paty Cantú

=== Season 6 ===
Name	Age	Description	Musical style
Laura Pausini	42 years old	International Star	Pop-Rock, Balada romántica, Pop, Latin music, Europop
Yuri	53 years old	International Artist	Latin Pop, Balada romántica, Pop, Ranchera
Maluma	23 years old	Urban Star	Reggaeton, Latin trap, Urban music
Carlos Vives	56 years old	International Star	Vallenato, Cumbia, Latin pop

=== Season 7 ===
Name	Age	Description	Musical style	Advisor(s)
Carlos Rivera	32 years old	International Artist	Latin pop, Balada romántica	Tommy Torres
Maluma	24 years old	International Artist	Reggaeton, Latin trap, Urban music	Piso 21
Natalia Jiménez	36 years old	International Artist	Latin pop, Pop-Rock	Sofía Reyes
Anitta	25 years old	International Artist	Reggaeton, Latin pop, Funk carioca	Prince Royce

=== Season 8 ===
Name	Age	Description	Musical style
Lupillo Rivera	47 years old	Regional Artist	Norteño, Ranchera, Banda sinaloense, Mariachi
Yahir	40 years old	National Artist	Latin pop, Balada romántica
Belinda	29 years old	International Artist	Latin pop, pop rock, dance-pop, electropop
Ricardo Montaner	61 years old	International Star	Latin pop, Balada romántica

=== Season 9 ===
Name	Age	Description	Musical style
Christian Nodal	21 years old	International Artist	Ranchera, Banda sinaloense, Mariachi, Latin pop
Ricardo Montaner	62 years old	International Star	Latin pop, Balada romántica
María José	44 years old	International Artist	Latin pop, pop rock, Rock, Balada romántica, soul
Belinda	30 years old	International Artist	Latin pop, pop rock, dance-pop, electropop

=== Season 10 ===
Name	Age	Description	Musical style
Edith Márquez	47 years old	International Artist	Balada, Pop, Ranchero, Bolero, Banda sinaloense
María José	45 years old	International Artist	Latin pop, pop rock, Rock, Balada romántica, soul
Jesús Navarro	35 years old	International Artist	Latin pop, Pop rock, Rock, Reggaeton
Miguel Bosé	65 years old	International Star	Pop, Balada, Latin pop

=== Season 11 ===
Name	Age	Description	Musical style
Yuridia	35 years old	International Artist	Balada, Balada romántica, Pop latino, Banda sinaloense
David Bisbal	42 years old	International Star	Pop, Balada romántica, Pop latino
Ha*Ash	36–35 years old	International Artists	Balada romántica, country, electropop, pop latino
Joss Favela	31 years old	Regional Artist	Banda sinaloense, Ranchera
