= Es Así =

Studio album by Ricardo Montaner
- Released: 28 October 1997
- Genre: Latin pop
- Length: 50:40
- Language: Spanish
- Label: WEA Latina
- Producer: Piero Cassano

Ricardo Montaner chronology
| Viene del Alma (1995) | Es Así (1997) | Con la London Metropolitan Orchestra (1999) |

Singles from Es Así
- 1. "Es Así" Released: 1997; 2. "Para Llorar" Released: 1998; 3. "Ojala" Released: 1998; 4. "La Mujer de Mi Vida"

Es Así (It Is So) is the ninth studio album released by Ricardo Montaner. It is his first album to be released under WEA Latina. The self-titled track became his first number one song on the Latin Pop Airplay chart. "La Mujer de Mi Vida" was featured as the theme song for the 1998 Venezuelan telenovela of the same name. "Para Llorar" was one of the recipients of the 1999 ASCAP Latin Awards on the Pop/Ballad category.

== Track listing ==
All tracks are written by Piero Cassano and Ricardo Montaner, except where noted.

| No. | Title | Writer(s) | Length |
|---|---|---|---|
| 1. | "Y Si Te Miro" | | 4:08 |
| 2. | "Tanto Que Decirte" | José Luis "Caplís" Chacín; Montaner | 4:35 |
| 3. | "La Mujer de Mi Vida" | Cassano; Chacín; Montaner | 4:15 |
| 4. | "Es Así" | | 5:02 |
| 5. | "Dame Olvido" | Chacín; Montaner | 4:46 |
| 6. | "Este Amor" | | 4:22 |
| 7. | "Para Llorar" | | 4:36 |
| 8. | "Ojala" | Cassano; Chacín; Montaner | 5:18 |
| 9. | "Tributo al Amor" | | 4:44 |
| 10. | "Te Pienso" | | 4:31 |
| 11. | "Una Palabra" | | 4:23 |

== Charts ==
| Chart (1997) | Peak position |
|---|---|
| US Top Latin Albums (Billboard) | 29 |
| US Latin Pop Albums (Billboard) | 12 |

== Sales and certifications ==
| Region | Certification | Certified units/sales |
|---|---|---|
| Argentina (CAPIF) | Gold | 30,000^{^} |
| United States (RIAA) | Platinum (Latin) | 100,000^{^} |
^{^} Shipments figures based on certification alone.
