= Alejandro Montaner =

Venezuelan singer (born 1976)

- Born: Alejandro Manuel Reglero Vaz; 7 May 1976 (age 50); Maracaibo, Zulia, Venezuela
- Citizenship: Venezuela; Argentina
- Education: University of Miami
- Occupation: Singer
- Years active: 1993–present
- Spouse: Ximena Datorre Torres (m. 2010)
- Musical career
- Genre: Latin pop
- Instrument: Vocals
- Label: Sony Latin (2001–present)

Alejandro Manuel Reglero Vaz (born 7 May 1976), known professionally as Alejandro Montaner, is a Venezuelan-born Argentine singer and the son of Ricardo Montaner. Montaner released in 2002 his debut album titled Todo Lo Que Tengo and two of its singles reached the Billboard Latin Songs chart, "Voy a Volverte Loca" (#10) and "Dímelo" (#18). In 2003, at the 15th Lo Nuestro Awards, he was nominated for Pop New Artist of the Year.

== Discography ==
Year	Album title	Label	Certifications
2002	Todo lo que tengo	Sony Music Latin	
2025	Voy a volverte loca	Sony Music Latin	
