= Ricardo Montaner =

Venezuelan singer

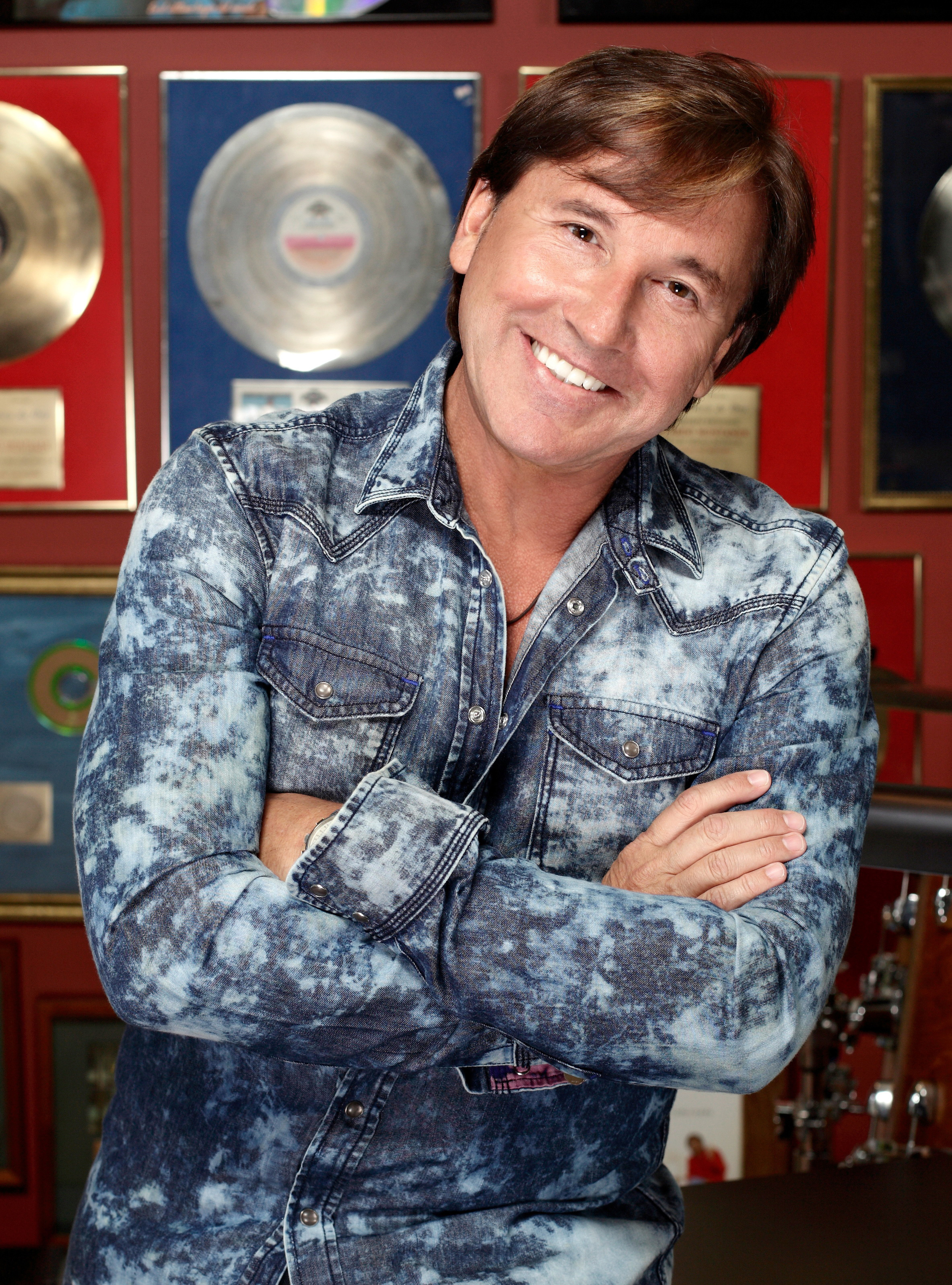
- Montaner in 2010
- Born: Héctor Eduardo Reglero Montaner; 8 September 1957 (age 69); Valentín Alsina, Argentina
- Citizenship: Argentina; Venezuela; Dominican Republic; Colombia
- Occupations: Singer; songwriter
- Years active: 1976–present
- Spouse: Marlene Rodríguez Miranda (m. 1989)
- Children: 5 (including Evaluna, Alejandro, Mauricio and Ricardo)
- Relatives: Camilo (son-in-law); Stefanía Roitman (daughter-in-law); Sara Escobar (daughter-in-law)
- Musical career
- Genre: Latin pop
- Instrument: Vocals
- Labels: Rodven (1982–1992); EMI Latin (1994–1995); Warner Latina (1997–2004); EMI Latin (2005–2010); Sony Latin (2012–present)

Héctor Eduardo Reglero Montaner (born 8 September 1957), better known as Ricardo Montaner (Spanish pronunciation: [riˈkaɾðo montaˈneɾ]), is a Venezuelan singer. Since starting his career in the late 1970s, he has released more than 24 albums, and many successful singles. He has sold an estimated 10 million records worldwide, making him one of the best-selling Latin music artists.

== Biography ==
=== Early years ===
Montaner was born as Héctor Eduardo Reglero Montaner, in Valentín Alsina, Buenos Aires Province, Argentina. His family moved to Venezuela when he was 6 years old. During his youth, he performed in the church choir in the city of Maracaibo. The first song he internationally performed in a festival in Peru was "Canta, viejo, canta". After this, he decided to choose his artistic name Ricardo Montaner (using his maternal family name).

In 1976, he recorded his first single named Mares produced by the Venezuelan Italian singer Roberto Luti. The same year he participated in the Ancon Festival (a Peruvian music festival from 1968 to 1984), where he gained some popularity after performing his song "Murallas".

In 1983, he released his first album titled Cada Día. Although the album was not a great success in Venezuela, it was a start for Montaner's career in Venezuela. It was not until 1987 that Montaner became widely popular in Venezuela, with the singles "Yo Que Te Amé" and "Vamos a Dejarlo" from his self-titled album.

=== Success ===
The following year he came out with Ricardo Montaner 2 which featured hit songs like "Tan Enamorados" and "A Donde Va el Amor". At the same time, he acted in the popular telenovela (soap opera), Niña Bonita. This became a starting point to make his songs known to the rest of Latin America where he won 4 platinum albums in Argentina alone. His next two albums, Un Toque de Misterio and En el Último Lugar del Mundo, became big hits in the Mexican charts, also in Central and South America he had hits such as "La Cima del Cielo", "Me Va a Extrañar", "Déjame Llorar" and "Será".

By 1992, Ricardo decided to hit the Spanish Caribbean with Los Hijos del Sol, an album that contained songs like "Castillo Azul", "Honda" and "Piel Adentro". That year, he also recorded a duet with Michelle, which was the Latin American version for the Aladdin song "A Whole New World" titled "Un Mundo Ideal". In the same year, he performed his live concert in Madison Square Garden with more than 16,000 people who attended the concert. Additionally, he released singles such as "La pequeña Venecia" in which he demonstrates his immense love and appreciation towards his naturalized country of Venezuela, in which he refers to Venezuela as his country. Montaner was nominated for three Lo Nuestro Awards in 1993: Pop Artist of the Year, and Pop Song and Video of the Year for the single "Castillo Azul".

Although Montaner has written most of his songs he has worked closely with other songwriters in Latin America such as Pablo Manavello, Ilan Chester, and Oscar Gómez. But in 1994, Ricardo Montaner wrote and produced all the songs in his album Una Mañana y un Camino, which became popular only years after his release due to the lack of promotion by his new record label EMI Latin, with which Ricardo would also release Viene del Alma in 1995, an Italian pop music themed album. Also in 1995, he teamed up with Yolandita Monge to establish a Guinness World Record for performing three concerts in different cities on the same day in Puerto Rico. This was only possible by air transportation via helicopter from stage to stage.

=== Changes in style ===
By 1997, Montaner again worked with Pablo Manavello and was signed under a new record company, Warner Music. Es Así brought Ricardo attention in the Spanish-speaking areas of the United States and allowed Montaner to tour more than 17 countries in Latin America. Songs like "La Mujer de Mi Vida", "Para Llorar" and "Es Así" became very popular all around.

In 1999, Montaner recorded his greatest hits album of his well-known songs featuring the London Metropolitan Orchestra. This was also a hit upon release, selling over 1 million copies. Ricardo made another attempt in 2001 with Sueño Repetido that included the bolero-style song "Bésame" arranged by Bebu Silvetti. Again, the song enjoyed immense success all over the world. Succeeding collaboration with Juan Carlos Calderón, Kike Santander, and Silvetti further propelled Ricardo's career to new heights in 2002, 2003, and 2004.

2002's Suma (Bolero style songs) and 2003's Prohibido Olvidar (balada pop) had fair results in terms of sales. "Si Tuviera Que Elegir" in Suma was written for his daughter. In 2003, he broke the record for the most concerts on the same tour in the theater of Bellas Artes in Puerto Rico. He sold out 18 concerts breaking his past record of 12, which was held previously by Yolandita Monge and Ricardo Arjona. In 2004, he made another album with the London Metropolitan Orchestra named Con La London Metropolitan Orchestra Vol. 2 featuring his latest hits songs and two exclusive songs such as "Desesperado" and "Esta Escrito". In 2005, Montaner launched Todo y Nada which featured the songs "Cuando a mi Lado Estas" and "Nada". For this album, he was nominated in the Latin Grammys for Album and Song of the Year for "Cuando a mi Lado Estas". "Amarte es mi Pecado" and "Heridas de Amor" are non-album songs that have been chosen to be the theme songs on two Mexican soap operas.

=== Recent years ===
In 2007, Ricardo released Las Mejores Canciones Del Mundo produced by Argentine producer Adrian Posse with the songs "Hoy Tengo Ganas de Ti", "Nostalgias (Argen Version)", "Échame A Mí La Culpa (Artista Invitado: Juanes)".

In 2008, he released Las Mejores Canciones Del Mundo II – Y Algunas Mías...! with the songs "Cuando Un Amigo Se Va", "Ansiedad", "Bésame (Featuring Pasión Vega)". In 2009, Montaner received the ASCAP Latin Heritage Award. His album "Viajero Frecuente" (Frequent Traveler) was launched on 16 October 2012, on iTunes, his first with Sony Music. The recording features a duet with his daughter actress and singer Evaluna Montaner, "La Gloria de Dios" (The Glory of God) whose video has more than 433 million views on YouTube/Vevo. Ricardo Montaner has sold over 65 million albums and keeps breaking records in arenas and theaters all over the world. One of the most remarkable was in Mar del Plata in Argentina where 220,000 people attended the concert that night. Montaner started his "Viajero Frecuente Tour 2013" in Mexico on 24 January 2013. The Special Edition of the "Viajero Frecuente" album released also in México featured a duet with Spanish musician Alejandro Sanz.

In October 2016, "Ida y Vuelta" was released, containing 20 songs, of which 11 were written by him. This album is different because he sang nine songs written by well known Mexican singers; in return, those Mexican singers sang some of Montaner's songs, all in the same album. A month later, Montaner received the Latin Grammy Lifetime Achievement Award.

== Personal life ==
Montaner is married to Marlene Rodríguez Miranda, the daughter of shareholder and owner of the former Venezuelan record company Sonorodven, where Montaner started his career. He has three children with Marlene: Ricardo, Mauricio, and Evaluna. He also has two older sons from a previous marriage with Ana Vaz: Alejandro and Héctor Jr. All of them are singers: Evaluna, Héctor, and Alejandro perform independently, while Mauricio and Ricardo formed a duo together known as Mau y Ricky.

In 1994, after Montaner fell out with his record label Sonorodven, he signed with Sonográfica. This was cause for a legal dispute between the two companies, exacerbating a struggle between them which has gone on since about 2006.

Montaner is a citizen of Argentina, Venezuela, Colombia and the Dominican Republic. He is an Argentine citizen from birth and later became a naturalised Venezuelan citizen, having moved there with his family at the age of 6. In 2012, Montaner was awarded Colombian citizenship by then-president Juan Manuel Santos, having been a judge for the TV programme La Voz Colombia. Montaner has said that he does not identify as Argentine.

Originally from a Catholic background, Montaner was an Evangelical Christian as of 2012.

== Discography ==
Year	Album title	Label	Certifications
1983	Cada Día	Palacio de la Música (Venezuela)	
1986	Ricardo Montaner	Sonorodven (Venezuela)	
1988	Ricardo Montaner 2	Sonorodven (Venezuela)	
1989	Un Toque de Misterio	Sonorodven (Venezuela)	
1991	En El Último Lugar del Mundo	Sonorodven (Venezuela)	
1992	Los Hijos del Sol	Sonorodven (Venezuela)	
1994	Una Mañana y Un Camino	EMI Music Latin (Estados Unidos)	
1995	Viene del Alma	EMI Music Latin (Estados Unidos)	
1997	Es Así	Warner Music Latin (Estados Unidos)	CAPIF: Gold; RIAA: Platinum (Latin)
1999	Con La London Metropolitan Orchestra	Warner Music Latin (Estados Unidos)	AMPROFON: Platinum; CAPIF: Platinum; RIAA: Platinum (Latin)
2001	Sueño Repetido	Warner Music Latin (Estados Unidos)	CAPIF: Platinum; RIAA: 2× Platinum (Latin)
2002	Suma	Warner Music Latin (Estados Unidos)	CAPIF: Gold; RIAA: Platinum (Latin)
2003	Prohibido Olvidar	Warner Music Latin (Estados Unidos)	CAPIF: Gold
2004	Con La London Metropolitan Orchestra, Vol. 2	Warner Music Latin (Estados Unidos)	CAPIF: Gold
2005	Todo y Nada	EMI Televisa Music (Estados Unidos)	
2007	Las Mejores Canciones del Mundo	EMI Televisa Music (Estados Unidos)	AMPROFON: Platinum
2008	Las Mejores Canciones del Mundo II – Y Algunas Mías...!	EMI Televisa Music (Estados Unidos)	CAPIF: Gold; AMPROFON: Gold
2009	Las Cosas Son Como Son	EMI Televisa Music (Estados Unidos)	
2012	Viajero Frecuente	Sony Music Latin (Estados Unidos)	AMPROFON: Gold
2014	Agradecido	Sony Music Latin (Estados Unidos)	
2016	Ida y Vuelta	Sony Music Latin (Estados Unidos)	AMPROFON: Platinum
2019	Montaner	Sony Music Latin (Estados Unidos)	
2021	Fe	Sony Music Latin (Estados Unidos)	
2022	Tango	Sony Music Latin (Estados Unidos)	

== Billboard charts ==
https://www.billboard.com/artist/ricardo-montaner/chart-history/htl/

- La Cima del Cielo (#1)
- Castillo Azul (#1)
- Piel Adentro (#1)
- Quisiera (#1)
- Déjame Llorar (#2)
- Será (#2)
- El Poder de Tu Amor (#2)
- Yo Puedo Hacer (#2)
- Me Va a Extrañar (#4)
- Al Final del Arco Iris (#4)
- Bésame (#4)
- Es Así (#5)
- Que Ganas (#5)
- Para Llorar (#6)
- Cuando a Mi Lado Estás (#6)
- Sólo con Un Beso (#7)
- Honda (#8)
- No Te Pareces a Mí (#8)
- Si Tuviera Que Elegir (#8)
- Tan Enamorados (#9)
- A Dónde Va el Amor (#10)
- La Pequeña Venezia (#10)
- Resumiendo (#11)
- Desesperado (#11)
- Vamos Pa' la Conga (#12)
- La Clave del Amor (#12)
- En el Último Lugar del Mundo (#13)
- Muchacha (#21)
- Hoy Tengo Ganas de Ti (#23)
- Debo Cambiar de Amor (#27)
- Ojos Negros (#28)
- Los Hijos del Sol (#29)
- Heridas de Amor (#29)
- Ojalá (#30)
- Para un Poco (#30)
- Soy Tuyo (#34)
- Convenceme (#38)

== Filmography ==
- Betty La Fea (himself), 2000
- Los Reyes (himself), 2005
- Rebelde (Mexican telenovela) (himself), 2005
- Casi angeles (telenovela Argentina) (himself), 2009
- La Voz Colombia, 2012–2013
- La Voz Argentina, 2018–2022
- La Voz Mexico, 2019–2020
- La Voz Senior, 2019–2021

== See also ==
- List of best-selling Latin music artists
- List of singer-songwriters/Venezuela
