= Pablo Manavello =

- Born: May 21, 1950; Treviso, Italy
- Died: January 18, 2016 (aged 65) Miami, Florida, US
- Genres: Latin pop, rock, Latin music, Jazz fusion
- Occupations: Singer, songwriter, record producer, composer
- Instruments: Guitar, mandolin
- Years active: 1967–2016
- Labels: Rodven, Top Hits, Warner Music, EMI Televisa Music
- Formerly of: Ricardo Montaner, Chayanne, Olga Tañon, Carlos Vives, Luis Fonsi, Noelia, Yolandita Monge, Melissa Griffiths, , Ilan Chester, Ignacio Peña, Guillermo Dávila, Ricky Martin; Soraya, Shakira, Paralamas
- Website: pablomanavello.com

Pablo Manavello (May 21, 1950 – January 18, 2016) was an Italian-born Venezuelan composer, guitarist, singer and songwriter.

== Career ==
Manavello started his career in the early 1970s in Caracas and participated in more than 50 albums (including his own). He also worked for many Hispanic artists such as Ricardo Montaner, Yolandita Monge Chayanne, Carlos Vives, Shakira, Ricky Martin, Antonio De Carlo, Soraya, Melissa , Paralamas, and many others, and scored films and TV shows.

Manavello began his career in the mid-1960s with Los Memphis, a pop-rock band from Caracas influenced by The Beatles. Los Memphis released their first album in 1967 and another one in 1969 before disbanding. Later he founded Sangre, which released a self-titled album 1971. He worked as a session musician before collaborating with Juan Michelena in the protest album "Dicen que soy..." in 1977 and joining Vytas Brenner's Venezuelan fusion band Ofrenda.

In 1979 he released Cosas Sencillas, his first solo album and began a successful career as composer and producer of many Latin artists and bands. He then interrupted his career after receiving a scholarship from the Venezuelan Government to study film scoring in Berklee College of Music. He graduated in 1982, and by the late 80s became one of the top Latin music producers.

His debut as composer and producer was in Ricardo Montaner's first album in 1986. That album was certified multi-platinum in Venezuela and reached #1 on the Billboard Latin Pop Albums chart. Afterward, he worked as producer and composer for other Venezuelan acts like Melissa, Kiara and Ilan Chester.

Thereafter, Manavello moved to Miami, Florida, where he continued to produce records for Olga Tañón and Luis Fonsi, among others.

== Discography ==
=== Albums ===
Year	Album	Label
1979	Cosas Sencillas	Color/ Corporación Los Ruices
1980	Un Día de Otoño	Polydor
1981	Mi Fantasía	Polydor
1982	Una Mirada hacia Dentro	Polydor
1985	Gota de Fuego	Sonorodven
1989	En Concreto	Sonorodven
