= La Voz Colombia =

Television program

- Genre: Reality television
- Created by: John de Mol Jr. Roel van Velzen
- Directed by: Pablo Garro
- Presented by: Carlos Ponce; Alejandro Palacio; Linda Palma; Diego Sáenz (Backstage)
- Judges: Fanny Lú; Ricardo Montaner; Andres Cepeda; Carlos Vives; Gilberto Santa Rosa
- Country of origin: Colombia
- Original language: Spanish
- No. of seasons: 2
- No. of episodes: 118

Production
- Executive producer: John de Mol Jr.

Original release
- Network: Caracol TV
- Release: October 1, 2012 – December 18, 2013

Related
- The Voice (franchise); La Voz Kids; La Voz Senior

La Voz Colombia (Spanish for The Voice Colombia) is a reality television singing competition, based on the original Dutch version, which has become a worldwide phenomenon. Over 50 countries now have their own version of The Voice. In this show, Colombians with outstanding singing talent are sought, and will be coached by four great music superstars who will be in charge of finding and training the next "voice" of Colombia.

The first season premiered on Caracol TV on October 1, 2012. For the second season, The Voice Colombia has a Second Screen TV Application, developed by Applicaster. The app offers an aggregated live feed of both broadcaster driven activities and social networks integration. The activities include a variety of gamification events, behind the scenes exclusive content, and various layers of information, to enhance primetime viewership. Show-related tweets and Facebook posts are integrated into the TV app feed during live primetime shows. Parlar TV, Caracol TV's app is available on the app store and on Google Play.

The winner of season 1 was Miranda Cardona and the winner of Season 2 was Camilo Martinez.

== Format ==
Participants attempt their shot at the competition in blind auditions, where the judges and future coaches, sit with their backs to the contestants. This format allows the participants to be judged solely on their singing ability and not on physical appearance. Judges can turn their chairs at the press of a button, indicating that they are interested in the performer. If more than one judge turns his/her chair, the contestant can choose a judge who will then become their coach as well. This format is based on the talent show The Voice.

At the second stage, The Battles, coaches are forced to reduce their team by half. They have to pit two of their contestants to sing against each other in a ring. In the end each coach made the decision to eliminate one of them, who left the competition. In this phase, coaches are supported by guest advisors.

The third stage is the live shows, which are broadcast live. Each contestant must sing for the coaches. At the end of the show, each coach will be obliged to saves one from his/her team. The elimination consists of the two nominees at risk each week, the audience save one of the nominees and the other two will sing the song with which they performed in the show. The coach will eliminate one. The elimination procedure continues until there is one artists per team in the final. In the second season, the Live Shows had format changed and any coach could have no finalist in the final.

Due to a clause in the contract between Caracol and Talpa (producer that owns the format), the program is not broadcast internationally, with the exception of Spain and Ecuador, due to a special cause.

The first season of the show released a compilation CD, Lo Mejor de La Voz Colombia ("The Best of The Voice Colombia"), recorded by 12 of the contestants, and was put on sale in the country, where it was certified platinum.

Thanks to the excellent performance of The Voice Colombia in Ecuador, Ecuavisa aired the first season of The Voice Colombia and was one of the only The Voice versions to be transmitted outside the originating country.

== Coaches and hosts ==
In the first season Carlos Vives, Ricardo Montaner, Andrés Cepeda and Fanny Lu were the coaches, while battle advisors were Maia, MR (Mau and Ricky Montaner), Amaury Gutiérrez, and Gilberto Santa Rosa. For the second season, Carlos Vives announced that due to several tours and prior commitments he would not return, for which "The gentleman of salsa" Gilberto Santa Rosa replaced him on the coaching panel.

The show was hosted by Carlos Ponce, Linda Palma and Diego Sáenz in season 1. Alejandro Palacio replaced Ponce in season 2.

=== Coaches' advisors ===
Season	Coaches			
1	Carlos Vives	Ricardo Montaner	Fanny Lu	Andrés Cepeda
1	Maía	Mau & Ricky Montaner	Gilberto Santa Rosa	Amaury Gutiérrez
2	Gilberto Santa Rosa	Mau & Ricky Montaner	Luis Fonsi	Kike Santander
2	Kany García	Mau & Ricky Montaner	Luis Fonsi	Kike Santander

=== Coaches' teams ===
- – Winner
- – Runner-up
- – Third place
- – Fourth place

Season	Coaches			
Season	Ricardo Montaner	Andrés Cepeda	Carlos Vives	Fanny Lu
1	- Miranda; - Ignacio Peña; - Ana María Villa; - Alejandro Preciado; - Joan Alarcón; - Dahyana Ríos; - Daniel Lema; - Orlando Hurtado; - Yohana Alvarado	- Victoria Castillo; - Víctor Rodríguez; - Julieth Rodríguez; - Nina Díaz; - Sebastián Trujillo; - Juan Manuel Coral; - Steven Arenas; - Patricia del Valle; - Angelo Milán	- Giovanna Giacometto; - Roxanna Restrepo; - Iván Camilo Quiroga; - Andrea Castellanos; - Juan Riveros; - Diana Ciliberti; - Ana Milena Quevedo; - Julián Villa; - Nicoyembe	- Andrea Flórez; - Andrés Parra; - Giovanny Gil; - Juan David Becerra; - Damián Torres; - Paola Vargas; - Pilar Cabrera; - Shadia Abdalá; - Carmen Antonilez
2	Ricardo Montaner	Andrés Cepeda	Gilberto Santa Rosa	Fanny Lu (Note: In the second season, because of the format change in the Live shows, Santa Rosa ended up with two finalists in the Final and Fanny Lu did not have a finalist.)
2	- Jessica Agualimpia; - Aura y Catherine Jiménez; - Jerónimo Hernández; - Andrea Orozco; - Carlos Manjarrés; - David Marulanda; - Esmeralda Carvajal; - Juan Manuel Güiza	- Camilo Martínez; - José Rodríguez; - Jorge "Coke" Estupiñan; - Yesid "Jessi" Uribe; - Jair Santrich; - Annie McCausland; - Mariana Gómez; - Fallon Camargo	- Anita Moreno; - J. Cadenas; - María Angélica Chavarriaga; - Helder Balanta; - Diego Portilla; - Carlos Jaraba; - Leonardo Medina; - Estefanía "Nhya" Varela	- Javier Rodríguez; - Laura Ballesteros; - Hugo "Junior" Bolívar; - Julián Díaz; - Leonela Mosquera; - Reinel Valencia; - Bryan Visbal; - Juan Carlos Ángel "Angelo"

== Season summary ==
La Voz Colombia series overview
Season	First aired	Last aired	Winner	Runner-up	Third place	Fourth place	Winning coach	Presenters		Coaches (chairs' order)			
Season	First aired	Last aired	Winner	Runner-up	Third place	Fourth place	Winning coach	Main	Backstage	1	2	3	4
1	1 Oct 2012	20 Dec 2012	Miranda	Victoria Castillo	Giovanna Giacometto	Andrea Flórez	Ricardo Montaner	Carlos Ponce, Linda Palma	Diego Sáenz	Carlos	Fanny	Ricardo	Cepeda
2	23 Sep 2013	18 Dec 2013	Camilo Martínez	Jessica Agualimpia	Anita Moreno	J. Cadenas	Andrés Cepeda	Palma, Alejandro Palacio	Diego Sáenz	Gilberto	Fanny	Ricardo	Cepeda

== Kids edition ==
- La Voz Kids is a Colombian kids talent show, based on the Dutch competition The Voice Kids, broadcast by Caracol Television. In each season, contestants are trained by one of the three coaches, competing to win COL$300 million and a contract with Universal Music. Participation is only open to children aged from 6 to 15. As of September 2023, information on season 7 has announced which will take place in 2024.

=== Format ===
The format of La Voz Kids share the same blind audition rules from the adult's version. However, in the battles, three participants from the same team are put against each other and only one advances to the next stage. The next stage is the superbattles, where the teams are reduced again. Each coach must organize battles and choose 3 or 2 participants of their team to face each other. Each contestant will be assigned a different song. After that, each coach will have 5 participants to the live shows and a contestant will leave until the three finalists, one from each team, remain in the final.

Starting from the second season of La Voz Kids, participants who are eliminated in the super battles round have the opportunity to return to the competition. Each contestant will sing for the coaches with a free-choice song. In the end, six contestants enter again and can choose the coach they want to go with.

=== Coaches and hosts ===
- For La Voz Kids, the coaching panel consists of two coaches from the adult version, Andrés Cepeda and Fanny Lu, and then having its own coach, Maluma. In season three, Maluma was replaced by Sebastián Yatra. The show was hosted by Alejandro Palacio and Linda Palma in the first two seasons. Laura Tobón replaced Palma from season three onward. Laura Acuña replaced Palacio for season five. Ivan Lalinde replaced Tobon for season six.

== Teens edition ==
- La Voz Teens was the first-ever teens' version on The Voice franchise. The difference from the kids' versions is that participation was only open to singers between the ages of 13 and 17. In 2016, the first and, so far, only season premiered.

=== Format ===
The format of La Voz Teens share the same blind audition rules from the adult's version. However, in the battles, three participants from the same team are put against each other and only one advances to the next stage. The next stage is the superbattles, where the teams are reduced again. Each coach must organize battles and choose 3 or 2 participants of their team to face each other. Each contestant will be assigned a different song. After that, each coach will have 5 participants to the live shows and a contestant will leave until the three finalists, one from each team, remain in the final.

== La Voz Kids & La Voz Teens ==
- For La Voz Teens, Cepeda was part of the coaching panel, along with Venezuelan singer Gusi, and ChocQuibTown singer Gloria Martinez. The hosts were Tobón and Karen Martínez, with Catalina Uribe on the backstage.

=== Coaches' timeline ===
Seasons
Coach	1	2	3	4	5	6	7
Andrés Cepeda							
Fanny Lu							
Maluma							
Sebastián Yatra							
Natalia Jiménez							
Jesús Navarro							
Kany García							
Nacho							
Greeicy							
Aleks Syntek							

=== Coaches and finalists ===
– Winning coach & contestant.
– Runner-up coach & contestant.
– Third place coach & contestant.

- Winners are in bold, remaining finalists in italic, and eliminated contestants in small font.

Season	Coaches		
1	Maluma	Fanny Lu	Andrés Cepeda
1	**Ivanna García**; Juan Sebastian Serna; Luis Giraldo; María Fernanda Herrera; Jessica Angulo; Óscar Chalán; Valeria Góez; Matthew Moreno; Esmeralda Gil	Tatiana Cañizares; Helen Saray Villegas; Isabella Ruiz; Magdalena Van Eps; Sara Ramírez; Melissa Cáceres; Carolina Cruz; Cristian Ordóñez; Juan José Jiménez	Melissa Anaya; Adrián Londoño; Fabio Trillos; Daniela Arredondo; Natalia Bedoya; Andrés Betancurt; Santiago Bonilla; David Peña; Miguel Reyes
2	Maluma	Fanny Lu	Andrés Cepeda
2	Ana Rosales; Juan Andrés Orozco; Gabriela Parra; María Fernanda Cardona; Mía Sánchez; Juan David Aparicio; Daniela Sánchez; Keyla Rivera; María Alejandra Ramírez	Camilo Martínez; Lenni and Daniel Algarra; César Augusto Zuluaga; Zharick Sarmiento; Juan José Figueroa; Mariana Gómez; Nicolás Hernández; María de los Ángeles Márquez; Ana Sofía Londoño	**Luis Mario Torres**; Lenni and Daniel Algarra; César Augusto Zuluaga; Zharick Sarmiento; Juan José Figueroa; Mariana Gómez; Nicolás Hernández; María de los Ángeles Márquez; Ana Sofía Londoño
3	Sebastián Yatra	Fanny Lu	Andrés Cepeda
3	**Juanse Laverde**; Robert Farid Loaiza; David Alejandro Tarapues; María Juliana López; Víctor Swing; María Camila Cajiao; Montserrat Van Eps; Ana Sofía "Nana"; Juan David Ortega	Jorge Nasra; Brayan Rodríguez; Azuquitar; Steven Lucas Padilla; Camila Esparza; Jhon Alan Borda; Mariana Ramírez; Mariángeles Viloria; Danna Marcela Vidal	Carlos Mario Castro; Santiago Santos; Chevy de León; Julieth; Tomás García; Mar Ocampo; Mario Alejandro Rodríguez; Juan José Rey; Saray Sofía Ardila
4	Sebastián Yatra	Fanny Lu	Andrés Cepeda
4	Samuel David; Jaziel; Daniel Ortega; Luis Ángel Maldonado; Juan David Rueda; Lukas Kaskas; Pipe Prado; Ana Sofía Trejos; Isabela Camacho	Maite Montenegro; Luisa María Vásquez; Valentina Paola Parra; Sarah Lucía Prieto; Katerin Muñoz; Sara Marcela Ortega; Juan Esteban Mendoza; Angie Daniela Serna; Damar Guerrero	**Anabelle Campaña**; Alexandra Luque; Angie Vannesa Ortega; Isabella Danies; Nataly Martínez; Melissa Murillo; Natalia Madariaga; María José López; Simón García
5	Jesús Navarro	Natalia Jiménez	Andrés Cepeda
5	Brayan D. María Camila Campo; Danna Carolina Parra; Allegra; Sneider Navarro; Isabella Villamil; Leyder Esteban Marín; Samuel Chávez; Hostin Ciro	**Maria Liz Patiño**; Shaireth Rosado; Angelyn Vergara; Mía Cortés; Alan David Bueno; Valeria Pérez; María Laura Colorado; Paola Andrea Manrique; Dylan Daniel Bustos	Josué Salazar; Frailyn Chaverra; Stefanía Linares; Laura Sofía Rosas; Juan Pablo Eraso; Camilo Vargas; Darwin Arias; Jesús Adrián Parra; Samuel Cuervo
6	Nacho	Kany García	Andrés Cepeda
6	Sky Cuellar; Sebas and Alex; Adriel Santiago; Sofia Isabel Arévalo; Paloma Serrano Caceres; Omar David Marcano Peña; Maria Parra; Sol Ángel; Diego Gutierrez	Nicolás Monroy; Simón Cifuentes; Maite Contreras; Mathías Naranjo; Laura Sofia; Manuel José Leal; Mary and Angela; Emmanuel Montes; Manuela	**Diana Camila**; Jean Simon; José Alejandro Isandará; Emmanuel Caicedo; Jade; Sahian Maria; Tamara Gordon; Ángel Santiago; Sara Castro Fuentes
7	Aleks Syntek	Greeicy	Andrés Cepeda
7	Matias Hernández; Juanita Botero Vallejo; Matias Gaviria; Helen de Los Ángeles; José Alejandro Rodríguez Peñaranda; Ashley Valentina Arenas	Emiliana Pérez; Danna Michel González; Nehemias Camaño; Isabella Velásquez; Shaira Nieves; Daniel José Galvis	**Carranga Kids**; Ernesto Hernández; Miguel Ángel Figueroa Muñoz; Fabián Alejandro Rodríguez; Sebastian Isaac Jiménez Figueroa; Guillermo Antonio Suárez

=== Season summary ===
Colombian La Voz Kids series overview
Season	Year aired	Winner	Runner-up	Third place	Winning coach	Presenter	Backstage host	Coaches (chairs' order)		
Season	Year aired	Winner	Runner-up	Third place	Winning coach	Presenter	Backstage host	1	2	3
1	2014	Ivanna García	Tatiana Cañizares	Melissa Anaya	Maluma	Alejandro Palacio	Linda Palma	Maluma	Fanny	Cepeda
2	2015	Luis Mario Torres	Camilo Martínez	Ana Rosales	Andrés Cepeda	Alejandro Palacio	Linda Palma	Maluma	Fanny	Cepeda
3	2018	Juanse Laverde	Carlos Mario Castro	Jorge Nasra	Sebastián Yatra	Alejandro Palacio	Laura Tobón	Yatra	Fanny	Cepeda
4	2019	Anabelle Campaña	Maite Montenegro	Samuel David	Andrés Cepeda	Alejandro Palacio	Laura Tobón	Yatra	Fanny	Cepeda
5	2021	Maria Liz Patiño	Josué Salazar	Brayan D.	Natalia Jiménez	Laura Acuña	Laura Tobón	Jesús	Natalia	Cepeda
6	2022	Diana Camila	Sky Cuellar	Nicolás Monroy	Andrés Cepeda	Laura Acuña	Iván Lalinde	Nacho	Kany	Cepeda
7	2024	Carranga Kids	Matias Hernández	Emiliana Pérez	Andrés Cepeda	Laura Tobón	Iván Lalinde	Syntek	Greeicy	Cepeda

Colombian La Voz Teens series overview
Season	First aired	Winner	Runner-up	Third place	Winning coach	Presenters		Coaches (chairs' order)		
Season	First aired	Winner	Runner-up	Third place	Winning coach	Main	Backstage	1	2	3
1	2016	Caliope	Nikki Garden	Jennifer Ramírez	Gloria Martinez	Karen Martínez; Laura Tobón	Catalina Uribe	Gusi	Goyo	Cepeda

== La Voz Senior ==
La Voz Senior is new edition in Colombia to premiere on September 20, 2021 under Caracol TV. Based on the Dutch competition, The Voice Senior, the show is only for singers over the age of 60. Auditions for the first season were announced through the official website and other social media accounts along with the comeback of La Voz Kids. Coaches for the first season were Andrés Cepeda, Natalia Jiménez and Jesus Navarro. The show is presented by Laura Tobón and Laura Acuña.

=== Coaches' timeline ===
Coach	Seasons	
Coach	1	2
Andrés Cepeda		
Natalia Jiménez		
Jesús Navarro		
Kany García		
Nacho		

=== Series overview ===
Colombian La Voz Senior series overview
Season	First aired	Last aired	Winner	Runner-up	Third place	Winning coach	Presenters	Coaches (chairs' order)		
Season	First aired	Last aired	Winner	Runner-up	Third place	Winning coach	Presenters	1	2	3
1	20 Sep 2021	25 Oct 2021	María Nelfi	Emeterio Torres	Haydee Barros	Natalia Jiménez	Laura Tobón, Laura Acuña	Jesús	Natalia	Cepeda
2	13 Sep 2022	1 Nov 2022	Chencho	Nubia Ibeth	Gloria Elena	Kany García	Laura Acuña, Iván Lalinde	Nacho	Kany	Cepeda

== Reception ==
=== Accolades ===
Year	Award	Category	Recipients	Result
2013	India Catalina Awards	Best Competition Program	The Voice Colombia	Won
2014	India Catalina Awards	Best Competition Program	The Voice Colombia	Won
2014	India Catalina Awards	Best presenter (a) of entertainment	Linda Palma	Nominated
2014	TVyNovelas Awards	Best reality or contest	The Voice Colombia	Won
2014	TVyNovelas Awards	Best Favorite jury	Andrés Cepeda	Won
2014	TVyNovelas Awards	Best Favorite jury	Fanny Lu	Nominated
2014	TVyNovelas Awards	Best Favorite jury	Ricardo Montaner	Nominated
2014	Nickelodeon Colombia Kids' Choice Awards	Favorite reality	The Voice Colombia	Nominated

== See also ==
- La voz Kids (Colombia) in (in Spanish)
- La Voz Teens (Colombia) in (in Spanish)
