= Día tras día =

Día tras día may refer to:

- Día tras día, the fifth studio album by Andrés Cepeda
- Día tras día, the 1951 Spanish film directed by Antonio del Amo
