= La Voz Kids (Colombian TV series) season 6 =

La Voz Kids
- Season 6
- Hosted by: Laura Acuña; Iván Lalinde (backstage host)
- Coaches: Andrés Cepeda; Kany García; Nacho
- Winner: Diana Camila
- Winning coach: Andrés Cepeda
- Runner-up: Sky Cuellar

Release
- Original network: Caracol Television
- Original release: July 18 – September 12, 2022

The sixth season of Colombian reality singing contest La Voz Kids aired on July 18 in Caracol Television. Andrés Cepeda is the only coach who returned from previous season, while joined by the new coaches, Puerto Rican singer Kany García and Venezuelan Nacho who replacing Jesús Navarro and Natalia Jimenez who both departed from the show.

Laura Acuña remains as the presenter, joined by Iván Lalinde serves as backstage host

== Teams ==
- Winner
- Runner-up
- Third place
- Eliminated in the Semi-final.
- Eliminated in the Súper Battles.
- Eliminated in the Battles

Coaches	Top 81 artists				
Nacho					
Nacho	Sky Cuellar	Sebas and Alex	Adriel Santiago	Sofia Isabel Arévalo	Paloma Serrano Caceres
Nacho	Omar David Marcano Peña	Maria Celeste Barrero Parra	Sol Ángel Alvarado Nossa	Diego Alejandro Zarate Gutierrez	Ricardo David Ramírez
Nacho	Giuliana Isabella Achury Pompa	Juneska Medina "Carla Jun"	Veronica Villa Arrieta	Maria Juliana	Juan David Cabiativa
Nacho	Antonia de Dios Ledesma Abril	Max Hoyos	David Santiago Méndez	Eddy Alejandro Pinto Guaranguay	Blue
Nacho	Victoria y Jacobo Agudelo	Christopher Y. Santiago	Yeicool Cono	Yisneidy Ramirez Usme	Maria Camila Ramos Unigarro
Nacho	Andrew Canchica Ortíz	Santiago Acevedo	—		
Kany García					
Kany García	Nicolás Monroy	Simón Cifuentes	Maite Contreras	Mathías Naranjo	Laura Sofia "Lauren"
Kany García	Manuel José Leal	Mary and Angela	Emmanuel Montes	Manuela	Angie Montes
Kany García	Angie Catalina Piedrahita Barreto	Santiago Rojas	Yanger Acevedo	Vale Romero	Victoria de Dios Guette
Kany García	Neymar Guevara	Juan David Pira	Francesca Echeverry Blázquez	Lucia Garcia	Juan David Muñoz
Kany García	Susana Amador	Manuela Villa Socarrás	Belén Canchila	Isaac Rodríguez Marcillo	Angel David De La Barrera López
Kany García	Sharyt Yirleny Parra Devia	Thaliana Díaz	—		
Andres Cepeda					
Andres Cepeda	Diana Camila	Jean Simon	José Alejandro Isandará	Emmanuel Caicedo	Jade
Andres Cepeda	Sahian Maria	Tamara Gordon	Ángel Santiago	Sara Castro Fuentes	Luciana Garcia Gaviria
Andres Cepeda	Ela del Castillo	Diana Marcela Perez López	Isabela Cortés Rojas	María José Amezcua Cruz	Juanita Cano
Andres Cepeda	Juan Martin	Martin Quintero Fernández	David Santiago Gomez	Jhónatan Camilo Montoya	Jaime Andres Lizcano
Andres Cepeda	Samy C. Urrego	Alison Colmenares	Cielo Rodríguez	Annie Blanco	Estefanía López Betancur "Mía"
Andres Cepeda	María José Jaramillo	Ana Maria Trujillo	—		

== The Blind Auditions ==
Each coach has to form its team with twenty-seven contestants. This season, implemented the "Block" button in which allows coaches to block one of the other coaches to prevent them recruiting the contestant on its team. Each coach has given indefinite number of blocks to use during the blinds, and when the blocked coach tries to turn around for the contestant, the chair won't turn.

✔	Coach pressed "QUIERO TU VOZ" button
	Artist elected to join this coach's team
	Artist defaulted to this coach's team
	Artist eliminated as no coach pressing "QUIERO TU VOZ" button
✘	Coach pressed the "QUIERO TU VOZ" button, but was blocked by Nacho
✘	Coach pressed the "QUIERO TU VOZ" button, but was blocked by Kany
✘	Coach pressed the "QUIERO TU VOZ" button, but was blocked by Cepeda

Episode	Order	Artist	Age	Hometown	Song	Coach's and artist's choices		
Episode	Order	Artist	Age	Hometown	Song	Nacho	Kany	Cepéda
Episode 1 (Monday, July 18)	1	Jhónatan Camilo Montoya	10	Apartadó	"Historia Triste"	✔	✔	✔
Episode 1 (Monday, July 18)	2	Sky Cuellar	13	Miami, Florida, United States	"Sweet Child o' Mine"	✔	✔	✘
Episode 1 (Monday, July 18)	3	Ricardo David Ramirez	10	Carabobo, Venezuela	"Lo Pasado, Pasado"	✔	✔	✔
Episode 1 (Monday, July 18)	4	José Alejandro Isandará	6	Medellín	"Sin Ti"	✔	✔	✔
Episode 1 (Monday, July 18)	5	Victoria De Dios Guette	11	Ciénaga	"Aquí Estoy Yo"	✔	✔	✔
Episode 1 (Monday, July 18)	6	Nicolás Monroy	12	Facatativá	"El Triste"	✔	✔	✘
Episode 2 (Tuesday, July 19)	1	Emanuel Caicedo	11	Ipiales	"No Se Va"	✔	✔	✔
Episode 2 (Tuesday, July 19)	2	Manuela Villa Socarrás	10	Momil	"Cómo Duele El Frío"	—	✔	✔
Episode 2 (Tuesday, July 19)	3	Santiago Acevedo	13	Medellín	"Recuérdame"	✔	✘	✔
Episode 2 (Tuesday, July 19)	4	Luciana Rangel	11	Barranquilla	"Gloria"	—	—	—
Episode 2 (Tuesday, July 19)	5	Sebas y Alex	10 & 11	Venezuela	"La Malagueña"	✔	✔	✔
Episode 2 (Tuesday, July 19)	6	Thaliana Díaz	11	Dosquebradas	"Pero Me Acuerdo De Ti"	—	✔	✔
Episode 2 (Tuesday, July 19)	7	Belén Canchila	10	Corozal, Puerto Rico	"Nunca Voy a Olvidarte"	—	✔	—
Episode 3 (Thursday, July 21)	1	Manuela Castillo	12	Tuluá	"Antes De Ti"	✔	✔	✔
Episode 3 (Thursday, July 21)	2	Maximiliano Hoyos Barrera	7	Medellín	"We Are the Champions"	✔	✔	✘
Episode 3 (Thursday, July 21)	3	Jean Simón	14	Santa Marta	"Momentos De Amor"	✔	✔	✔
Episode 3 (Thursday, July 21)	4	Christopher Yeray Santiago	8	Boyacá	"Cielo Rojo"	✔	✔	—
Episode 3 (Thursday, July 21)	5	Valentina Romero	15	Sincelejo	"Me Equivoqué"	—	✔	—
Episode 3 (Thursday, July 21)	6	Camilo Márquez	11	Maracaibo, Venezuela	"Baila, Baila, Baila"	—	—	—
Episode 4 (Friday, July 22)	1	Laura Sofia	9	Villavicencio	"Titanium"	✔	✔	✘
Episode 4 (Friday, July 22)	2	Jaime Andrés Gutiérrez Lizcano	10	—	"Amigo"	✔	✔	✔
Episode 4 (Friday, July 22)	3	Blue	6	Medellín	"Yo No Te Pido La Luna"	✔	—	—
Episode 4 (Friday, July 22)	4	Simón Cifuentes	10	Bogotá	"El Cantante"	—	✔	✔
Episode 4 (Friday, July 22)	5	Samuel David Urrego "Samy Cruz"	13	Bogotá	"Si Nos Dejan"	—	—	✔
Episode 4 (Friday, July 22)	6	Jerónimo Cañón Solís	8	Manizales	"No Tengo Dinero"	—	—	—
Episode 4 (Friday, July 22)	7	Elisabet Sanchez	9	Medellín	"Rosas"	—	—	—
Episode 5 (Monday, July 25)	1	Diego Alejandro Zárate Gutierrez	8	Barranquilla	"La De La Mochila Azul"	✔	✔	✘
Episode 5 (Monday, July 25)	2	Diana Camila Estupiñan Anchico	12	Buenaventura	"Senderito De Amor"	✔	✔	✔
Episode 5 (Monday, July 25)	3	Manuel José Leal	13	Bucaramanga	"Ángel"	✔	✔	—
Episode 5 (Monday, July 25)	4	Juliana Carolina Aristizabal Rojas	13	Barranquilla	"Tú"	—	—	—
Episode 5 (Monday, July 25)	5	Juan David Muñoz	13	Bucaramanga	"Temblando"	—	✔	—
Episode 5 (Monday, July 25)	6	Cristian David Moreno Espejo	9	Anolaima	"Por Tu Maldito Amor"	—	—	—
Episode 5 (Monday, July 25)	7	Giuliana Isabella Achury Pompa	10	Caracas, Venezuela	"Día De Suerte"	✔	—	—
Episode 6 (Tuesday, July 26)	1	David Santiago Gómez	11	Medellín	"La Calandria"	✔	✔	✔
Episode 6 (Tuesday, July 26)	2	Luisa Camila Zuñiga Aguilera "Jade"	10	Pasto	"Ángel"	—	—	✔
Episode 6 (Tuesday, July 26)	3	Robin Daniel Carrielsosa Rivera	9	Honda	"Cielito Lindo"	—	—	—
Episode 6 (Tuesday, July 26)	4	Manuela	12	Bello	"Cedro"	✔	✔	✔
Episode 6 (Tuesday, July 26)	5	Mateo Nuñez Anaya	9	Lorica	"Los Caminos De La Vida"	—	—	—
Episode 6 (Tuesday, July 26)	6	Susana Amador Rivera	9	Manizales	"Embrujo"	✘	✔	✔
Episode 7 (Wednesday, July 27)	1	Adriel Santiago	10	Cojedes, Venezuela	"¿Y Cómo Es Él?"	✔	✘	✔
Episode 7 (Wednesday, July 27)	2	Maite Contreras	7	Villeta	"Cucurrucucú Paloma"	—	✔	—
Episode 7 (Wednesday, July 27)	3	Mathías Naranjo	7	Pereira	"Canción del Mariachi"	✔	✔	—
Episode 7 (Wednesday, July 27)	4	Luisa María De Arco Mora	9	Barranquilla	"No Me Queda Más"	—	—	—
Episode 7 (Wednesday, July 27)	5	Juan Martin	12	Medellín	"Ben"	✔	—	✔
Episode 7 (Wednesday, July 27)	6	Jose Manuel Bermudez	10	Maracaibo, Venezuela	"A Puro Dolor"	—	—	—
Episode 8 (Thursday, July 28)	1	Neymar Fabián Guevara	8	Saravena	"Las Chamaquitas"	✘	✔	—
Episode 8 (Thursday, July 28)	2	Tamara Gordon	9	Madrid	"Colores En El Viento"	✔	✔	✔
Episode 8 (Thursday, July 28)	3	Mia Gordon	7	Madrid	"Roar"	—	—	—
Episode 8 (Thursday, July 28)	4	Paloma Serrano Caceres	8	Bogotá	"La Gata Bajo La Lluvia"	✔	—	—
Episode 8 (Thursday, July 28)	5	Ángel Santiago	12	El Cerrito	"Tenías Razón"	✔	—	✔
Episode 8 (Thursday, July 28)	6	Mariana Tael Alvear De La Hoz	9	Sincelejo	"Te Lo Pido Por Favor"	—	—	—
Episode 9 (Friday, July 29)	1	Maria José Jaramillo	6	Bogotá	"Veo En Ti La Luz"	✔	✔	✔
Episode 9 (Friday, July 29)	2	Sharyt Yirleny Parra Devia "Sharyt Yir"	9	Florencia	"Herida"	✔	✔	—
Episode 9 (Friday, July 29)	3	Maria Alejandra Vera	11	Cúcuta	"Me Nace Del Corazón"	—	—	—
Episode 9 (Friday, July 29)	4	Juneska Medina "Carla Jun"	10	Venezuela	"Yerberito Moderno"	✔	✘	✔
Episode 9 (Friday, July 29)	5	Santiago Rojas	11	—	"Mi Salón Está De Fiesta"	—	✔	—
Episode 9 (Friday, July 29)	6	Santiago Cepeda	12	Medellín	"Adios Amor"	—	—	—
Episode 10 (Monday, August 1)	1	Luciana Garcia Gaviria	8	Medellín	"Como La Flor"	✔	✘	✔
Episode 10 (Monday, August 1)	2	Andrés Camilo	13	Santa Marta	"Noviembre Sin Tí"	—	—	—
Episode 10 (Monday, August 1)	3	Omar David Marcano Peña	11	Anzoátegui, Venezuela	"Dulce Pecado"	✔	—	✔
Episode 10 (Monday, August 1)	4	Violeta Cañón	10	Medellín	"Ahora Te Puedes Marchar"	—	—	—
Episode 10 (Monday, August 1)	5	Martín Quintero Fernández	12	Cali	"No Me Doy Por Vencido"	✔	✔	✔
Episode 10 (Monday, August 1)	6	Eddy Alejandro Guaranguay	7	Pasto	"Deja Que Salga La Luna"	✔	—	—
Episode 11 (Tuesday, August 2)	1	Dian Lopez "Diana Payares"	12	Cartagena	"El Arcoiris"	✔	✔	✔
Episode 11 (Tuesday, August 2)	2	Diana Alejandra	12	Villavicencio	"No Hay Nadie Más"	—	—	—
Episode 11 (Tuesday, August 2)	3	Anngie Montes	9	Leticia	"Chiquitita"	✔	✔	✘
Episode 11 (Tuesday, August 2)	4	Juan Felipe Zambrano "Pipe R"	13	Ibagué	"Ya No Mi Amor"	—	—	—
Episode 11 (Tuesday, August 2)	5	David Santiago Méndez	11	Zipaquirá	"La De Los Hoyitos"	✔	—	—
Episode 11 (Tuesday, August 2)	6	María Paula Mero Vera	9	Ubaque	"Así Fué"	—	—	—
Episode 12 (Wednesday, August 3)	1	Juan Sebastian Portilla	11	Pamplona	"Sobreviviré"	—	—	—
Episode 12 (Wednesday, August 3)	2	Sol Ángel Alvarado Nossa	9	Bogotá	"Cuán Lejos Voy"	✔	✘	✔
Episode 12 (Wednesday, August 3)	3	Annie Blanco	9	Caracas, Venezuela	"Creo En Mí"	—	—	✔
Episode 12 (Wednesday, August 3)	4	Saray Munar Gómez	9	La Virginia	"No Puedo Olvidarla"	—	—	—
Episode 12 (Wednesday, August 3)	5	Juan David Pira	9	Soacha	"La Del Sombrerito"	—	✔	—
Episode 12 (Wednesday, August 3)	6	Marlon David	11	Barranquilla	"Como Mirarte"	—	—	—
Episode 13 (Thursday, August 4)	1	Sharon Pérez	13	—	"Llorar"	—	—	—
Episode 13 (Thursday, August 4)	2	Sofia Isabel Arévalo	13	Barranquilla	"Esta Vida"	✔	✔	✔
Episode 13 (Thursday, August 4)	3	Cielo Rodríguez	9	La Mesa	"Murió El Amor"	✔	—	✔
Episode 13 (Thursday, August 4)	4	Sebastián Miguel Silva	12	Bejuma, Carabobo, Venezuela	"Tu Falta De Querer"	—	—	—
Episode 13 (Thursday, August 4)	5	Francesca Echeverry Blázquez	10	Barranquilla	"Listen"	✔	✔	—
Episode 13 (Thursday, August 4)	6	Ian Alejandro Díaz	9	Bogotá	"Reminiscencias"	—	—	—
Episode 14 (Friday, August 5)	1	Danna Camila "Mila"	9	Soacha	"Es Demasiado Tarde"	—	—	—
Episode 14 (Friday, August 5)	2	Alison Colmenares "La Criolla Celeste"	5	Yopal	"Una Casita Bella Para Tí"	✘	✔	✔
Episode 14 (Friday, August 5)	3	Luciana	11	Medellín	"Se Me Acabó El Amor"	—	—	—
Episode 14 (Friday, August 5)	4	Yisneidy Ramirez Usme	10	—	"Ódiame"	✔	—	—
Episode 14 (Friday, August 5)	5	Gabriel Vélez "Gabo"	12	Bogotá	"Y Hubo Alguien"	—	—	—
Episode 14 (Friday, August 5)	6	Juan David Cabiativa	10	Bogotá	"Talking To The Moon"	✔	—	—
Episode 15 (Monday, August 8)	1	Victoria y Jacobo Agudelo	6	Manizales	"Un Año"	✔	—	✘
Episode 15 (Monday, August 8)	2	Mariana Sofia Bolaño Vieco	9	Becerril	"Nunca Es Suficiente"	—	—	—
Episode 15 (Monday, August 8)	3	Isaac Rodríguez Marcillo	11	Pasto	"Vivir Así Es Morir De Amor"	✔	✔	✔
Episode 15 (Monday, August 8)	4	Sara Castro Fuentes	12	Cali	"I Will Always Love You"	—	—	✔
Episode 15 (Monday, August 8)	5	Milán David Castañeda Giraldo "Milan El Casta"	6	Medellín	"Lo Que Pasó, Pasó"	—	—	—
Episode 15 (Monday, August 8)	6	Mathias Cifuentes	8	Medellín	"Corriente y Canelo"	—	—	—
Episode 16 (Tuesday, August 9)	1	Maria Camila Salamanca Garcia	11	Spain	"¡Que Bonito!"	—	—	—
Episode 16 (Tuesday, August 9)	2	Juanita Cano	11	Envigado	"Bésame Mucho"	✔	✔	✔
Episode 16 (Tuesday, August 9)	3	Alana y Samara Sanchez	8	Chia	"Dance Monkey"	—	—	—
Episode 16 (Tuesday, August 9)	4	Maria Celeste Barrero Parra	8	Duitama	"Un Beso y Una Flor"	✔	—	—
Episode 16 (Tuesday, August 9)	5	Adrián José	8	Venezuela	"Vida De Rico"	—	—	—
Episode 16 (Tuesday, August 9)	6	Yanger Acevedo	11	Arauca	"Ley Del Monte"	✘	✔	—
Episode 17 (Wednesday, August 10)	1	Isabela Cortés Rojas	8	Bogotá	"La Gota Fría"	✘	✔	✔
Episode 17 (Wednesday, August 10)	2	Lezly Restrepo	10	Caucasia	"Ocean"	—	—	—
Episode 17 (Wednesday, August 10)	3	Emmanuel Montes	11	Cartago	"El Crucifijo De Piedra"	✔	✔	—
Episode 17 (Wednesday, August 10)	4	Veronica Villa Arrieta	11	Barranquilla	"Hasta La Raíz"	✔	—	—
Episode 17 (Wednesday, August 10)	5	Nicolas Correa	7	Manizales	"Recuerdame"	—	—	—
Episode 17 (Wednesday, August 10)	6	José Luis Martelo "El Pequeño Mariachi"	10	Barranquilla	"La Mugrosita"	—	—	—
Episode 18 (Thursday, August 11)	1	Tomás Osorio	11	Manizales	"Fly Me to the Moon"	—	—	—
Episode 18 (Thursday, August 11)	2	Ana Maria Trujillo	7	Pasto	"Tutu"	✔	✘	✔
Episode 18 (Thursday, August 11)	3	Sahian Maria	12	Palmira	"La cigarra"	✔	✔	✔
Episode 18 (Thursday, August 11)	4	Sharon Valentina Angarita Hoover	11	Bogotá	"Por primera vez"	—	—	—
Episode 18 (Thursday, August 11)	5	Mary Lorena De La Barrera López	7	Lorica	"Amor eterno"	—	—	—
Episode 18 (Thursday, August 11)	6	Angel David De La Barrera López	11	Lorica	"Sin medir distancia"	—	✔	—
Episode 19 (Friday, August 12)	1	Salomé Hoyos Aristizabal	7	Medellín	"Calma"	—	—	—
Episode 19 (Friday, August 12)	2	Yeicool Cono	12	Armenia City	"La Tequilera"	✔	✔	✘
Episode 19 (Friday, August 12)	3	Danna Sofia Ortíz Berrío	9	Medellín	"Hijo de la luna"	—	—	—
Episode 19 (Friday, August 12)	4	Maria Camila Ramos Unigarro	9	Pasto	"Amor Prohibido"	✔	—	—
Episode 19 (Friday, August 12)	5	Leidy Viviana Galvis Vera	12	Soledad	"Mujer Latina"	—	—	—
Episode 19 (Friday, August 12)	6	Angie Catalina Piedrahita Barreto	9	Pitalito	"Ya te olvide"	—	✔	—
Episode 19 (Friday, August 12)	7	María José Amezcua Cruz	13	Chile	"O mio babbino caro"	—	—	✔
Episode 20 (Tuesday, August 16)	1	Lucia Garcia	9	Manizales	"Me muero"	—	✔	✘
Episode 20 (Tuesday, August 16)	2	Elena Sanchez Tello	7	Bogotá	"Florecita Rockera"	—	—	—
Episode 20 (Tuesday, August 16)	3	Antonia de Dios Ledesma Abril	7	Bogotá	"Dos oruguitas"	✔	—	—
Episode 20 (Tuesday, August 16)	4	Santiago Cortés	13	Bogotá	"Como quien pierde una estrella"	—	—	—
Episode 20 (Tuesday, August 16)	5	Maria Juliana	9	Bogotá	"¡Corre!"	✔	—	—
Episode 20 (Tuesday, August 16)	6	Nerisly Estrella Parra Gonzalez	11	Ciudad Ojeda, Venezuela	"Llegaste tú"	—	—	—
Episode 21 (Wednesday, August 17)	1	Nicole Valeria Suarez Rincón	11	Cúcuta	"Hechizo"	—	—	—
Episode 21 (Wednesday, August 17)	2	Maria Ángel Gallego Posada	10	Medellín	"No quererte"	—	—	—
Episode 21 (Wednesday, August 17)	3	Mary and Angela	12 & 14	Pasto	"Tu sí sabes quererme"	—	✔	—
Episode 21 (Wednesday, August 17)	4	Emmanuel Díaz Hernández	5	Los Patios	"Usted no me olvida"	—	Team full	—
Episode 21 (Wednesday, August 17)	5	Mia López Betancur	10	Támesis	"Hoy ya me voy"	✘	Team full	✔
Episode 21 (Wednesday, August 17)	6	Andrew Canchica Ortíz	13	Caracas, Venezuela	"Creo en tí"	✔	Team full	Team full

== The Battle Rounds ==
The battle rounds began on August 19. During this round, coaches would group their team by trios. At the end of the battle, the coach would choose the winner of the battle to proceed into the next round. The coaches decide with the help of advisors for their teams, Cali y El Dandee for team Nacho, Arelys Henao for team Kany and Alejandro Santamaría for team Cepeda

Artist won the Battle and advanced to the Super battles
Artist was eliminated

Episode	Coach	Order	Winner	Song	Loser	
Episode 22 (Friday, August 19)	Nacho	1	Adriel Santiago	Hoy Tengo Ganas De Ti	Andy C.	Santiago Acevedo
Episode 22 (Friday, August 19)	Kany García	2	Nicolas Monroy	Te Quiero Te Quiero	Sharyt Yir	Thaliana Díaz
Episode 22 (Friday, August 19)	Andrés Cepeda	3	Jose Alejandro Isandará	Historia De Un Amor	Maria José Jaramillo	Ana Maria Trujillo
Episode 23 (Monday, August 22)	Kany Garcia	1	Manuel José	Mi Niña Bonita	Isaac Rodríguez Marcillo	Ángel David
Episode 23 (Monday, August 22)	Andrés Cepeda	2	Tamara Gordon	El Sol No Regresa	Estefania López Betancur "Mia"	Annie Blanco
Episode 23 (Monday, August 22)	Nacho	3	Omar David Marcano Peña	Le Hace Falta Un Beso	Maria Camila Ramos Unigarro	Yisneydy Ramirez Usme
Episode 24 (Tuesday, August 23)	Andrés Cepeda	1	Luisa Camila Zuñiga Aguilera "Jade"	Prometo	Alison Colmenares	Cielo Rodríguez
Episode 24 (Tuesday, August 23)	Nacho	2	Sebas y Alex Marchán	Volver, Volver	Christopher Yeray Santiago	Yeicool Cono
Episode 24 (Tuesday, August 23)	Kany Garcia	3	Simón Cifuentes	Hasta Que Te Conocí	Shanis Belén Canchila	Manuela Villa Socarrás
Episode 25 (Wednesday, August 24)	Andrés Cepeda	1	Angel Santiago	La Bikina	Samuel David Urrego	Jaime Andres Gutiérrez Lizcano
Episode 25 (Wednesday, August 24)	Nacho	2	Sol Angel Alvarado Nossa	Más Fuerte	Victoria and Jacobo	Blue
Episode 25 (Wednesday, August 24)	Kany Garcia	3	Mary and Angela	Día Tras Día	Juan David Muñoz	Susana Amador
Episode 26 (Thursday, August 25)	Kany Garcia	1	Laura Sofia "Lauren"	Alguien	Francesca Echeverry Blázquez	Lucia Garcia
Episode 26 (Thursday, August 25)	Andrés Cepeda	2	Sahian Maria	Te Hubieras Ido Antes	David Santiago Gómez	Jhonatan Camilo Montoya Trujillo
Episode 26 (Thursday, August 25)	Nacho	3	Diego Alejandro Zarate Gutiérrez	Yo No Fui	David Santiago Méndez	Eddy Alejandro Pinto Guaranguay
Episode 27 (Friday, August 26)	Andrés Cepeda	1	Emanuel Caicedo	Besos En Guerra	Juan Martin	Martin Quintero Fernandez
Episode 27 (Friday, August 26)	Nacho	2	Maria Celeste Barrero Parra	Color Esperanza	Antonia de Dios Ledesma Abril	Maximiliano Hoyos Barrera
Episode 27 (Friday, August 26)	Kany Garcia	3	Mathías Naranjo	El Rey	Neymar Fabián Guevára	Juan David Pira
Episode 28 (Monday, August 29)	Kany Garcia	1	Manuela Gómez	Como Yo Te Amo	Valentina Romero	Victoria de Dios Guette López
Episode 28 (Monday, August 29)	Andrés Cepeda	2	Sara Castro Fuentes	Hero	Maria Jose Amezcua	Juanita Cano
Episode 28 (Monday, August 29)	Nacho	3	Paloma Serrano Caceres	Robarte Un Beso	Maria Juliana	Juan David Cabiativa
Episode 29 (Tuesday, August 30)	Nacho	1	Sofia Isabel Arévalo	Vivir Lo Nuestro	Juneska Medina "Karlayun"	Veronica Villa Arrieta
Episode 29 (Tuesday, August 30)	Kany Garcia	2	Emmanuel Montes	Los Besos Que Te Dí	Santiago Rojas	Yanger Acevedo
Episode 29 (Tuesday, August 30)	Andrés Cepeda	3	Jean Simón	Así Fué Mi Querer	Diana Marcela Pérez López "Diana Payares"	Isabela Cortés Rojas
Episode 30 (Wednesday, August 31)	Andrés Cepeda	1	Diana Camila Estupiñán Anchico	Flor Palida	Manuela Castillo "Ela Del Castillo	Luciana Garcia Gaviria
Episode 30 (Wednesday, August 31)	Kany Garcia	2	Maite Contreras	Popurri Juan Gabriel	Angie Montes	Angie Catalina Piedrahita Barreto
Episode 30 (Wednesday, August 31)	Nacho	3	Sky Cuellar	Como Yo Nadie Te Ha Amado	Giuliana Isabela Achury Pompa	Ricardo David Ramírez

== Super Battles ==
In this round, coaches divide the remaining artist from its team to trios and perform a song of their choice. After all artist performed, the coach would choose one artist to proceed to the semi-finals.

Artist won the Super Battles and advanced to the Semi-finals
Artist was eliminated

Episode	Coach	Order	Song	Artists		Song
Episode	Coach	Order	Song	Winner	Loser	Song
Episode 31 (Thursday, September 1)	Kany Garcia	1	La Quiero A Morir	Simón Cifuentes	Manuela Gomez	Libre
Episode 31 (Thursday, September 1)	Kany Garcia	1	La Quiero A Morir	Simón Cifuentes	Emmanuel Montes	Mi Chorro De Voz
Episode 31 (Thursday, September 1)	Nacho	2	Ay Chabela	Sebas y Alex Marchán	Sol Ángel Alvarado Nossa	Si Una Vez
Episode 31 (Thursday, September 1)	Nacho	2	Ay Chabela	Sebas y Alex Marchán	Diego Alejandro Zárate Gutiérrez	A La Antiguita
Episode 31 (Thursday, September 1)	Andrés Cepeda	3	Mi Buenaventura	Diana Camila Estupiñán Anchico	Ángel Santiago	Te Esperaré
Episode 31 (Thursday, September 1)	Andrés Cepeda	3	Mi Buenaventura	Diana Camila Estupiñán Anchico	Sara Castro Fuentes	Antologia
Episode 32 (Friday, September 2)	Nacho	1	María, María	Adriel Santiago	Omar David Marcano Peña	La Cima Del Cielo
Episode 32 (Friday, September 2)	Nacho	1	María, María	Adriel Santiago	Maria Celeste	Quizás, Quizás, Quizás
Episode 32 (Friday, September 2)	Andrés Cepeda	2	Como Tu Mujer	José Alejandro Isandará	Sahian Maria	Un Mundo Ideal
Episode 32 (Friday, September 2)	Andrés Cepeda	2	Como Tu Mujer	José Alejandro Isandará	Tamara Gordon	Rayito De Luna
Episode 32 (Friday, September 2)	Kany Garcia	3	El Pastor	Nicolas Monroy	Manuel José Leal	Por Amarte Así
Episode 32 (Friday, September 2)	Kany Garcia	3	El Pastor	Nicolas Monroy	Mary and Angela	Nada Fue Un Error
Episode 33 (Monday, September 5)	Andrés Cepeda	1	Jaime Molina	Jean Simón	Emanuel Caicedo	Lo Mejor Que Hay En Mi Vida
Episode 33 (Monday, September 5)	Andrés Cepeda	1	Jaime Molina	Jean Simón	Luisa Camila Zuñiga Aguilera "Jade"	Sin Documentos
Episode 33 (Monday, September 5)	Kany Garcia	3	Mujeres Divinas	Maite Contreras	Mathias Naranjo	La Chancla
Episode 33 (Monday, September 5)	Kany Garcia	3	Mujeres Divinas	Maite Contreras	Laura Sofia "Lauren"	Así No Te Amará Jamás
Episode 33 (Monday, September 5)	Nacho	3	Rolling in the Deep	Sky Cuellar	Sofia Isabel Arevalo	Que Precio Tiene El Cielo
Episode 33 (Monday, September 5)	Nacho	3	Rolling in the Deep	Sky Cuellar	Paloma Serrano Caceres	¿A Quien Le Importa?

== Final phase ==
In this stage, the 3 participants from each team will sing individually, and the coaches must choose 1 participant who will go on to the grand final.

Final phase color key
Artist was saved by his/her coach
Artist was eliminated

=== Semi-final ===
Episodie	Coach	Order	Artists	Song	Result
Episode 34 (Wednesday, September 7)	Nacho	1	Adriel Santiago	Mientes	Eliminated
Episode 34 (Wednesday, September 7)	Nacho	2	Sebas y Alex Marchán	Tú	Eliminated
Episode 34 (Wednesday, September 7)	Nacho	3	Sky Cuellar	Sola Otra Vez	Nacho's choice
Episode 35 (Thursday, September 8)	Andrés Cepeda	1	José Alejandro Isandará	La Barca	Eliminated
Episode 35 (Thursday, September 8)	Andrés Cepeda	2	Jean Simón	Bonita	Eliminated
Episode 35 (Thursday, September 8)	Andrés Cepeda	3	Diana Camila Estupiñán Anchico	La Rebelión	Cepeda's choice
Episode 36 (Friday, September 9)	Kany Garcia	1	Maite Contreras	Las Margaritas	Eliminated
Episode 36 (Friday, September 9)	Kany Garcia	2	Simón Cifuentes	Aguanilé	Eliminated
Episode 36 (Friday, September 9)	Kany Garcia	3	Nicolas Monroy	América, América	Kany's choice

==== Grand Final ====
Episodie	Coach	Order	Artists	Song	Result
Episode 37 (Monday, September 12)	Kany Garcia	1	Nicolas Monroy	El Triste	Third place
Episode 37 (Monday, September 12)	Andrés Cepeda	2	Diana Camila	Senderito De Amor	Winner
Episode 37 (Monday, September 12)	Nacho	3	Sky Cuellar	Sweet Child O' Mine	Runner-up

== Elimination chart ==
=== Overall ===
Color key
Artist's info

- Team Nacho
- Team Kany
- Team Cepeda

Result details

- Winner
- Runner-up
- Third place
- Saved by the coach
- Eliminated

Live Show Results per week
Artists	Super Battles	Semi-final, Top 3	Grand finale
Diana Camila	Safe	Safe	Winner
Sky Cuellar	Safe	Safe	Runner-up
Nicolas Monroy	Safe	Safe	Third place
Simón Cifuentes	Safe	Eliminated	Eliminated (Semi-final)
Maite Contreras	Safe	Eliminated	Eliminated (Semi-final)
Jean Simón	Safe	Eliminated	Eliminated (Semi-final)
José Alejandro Isandará	Safe	Eliminated	Eliminated (Semi-final)
Sebas y Alex Marchán	Safe	Eliminated	Eliminated (Semi-final)
Adriel Santiago	Safe	Eliminated	Eliminated (Semi-final)
Paloma Serrano Caceres	Eliminated	Eliminated (Super Battles)	
Sofia Isabel Arevalo	Eliminated	Eliminated (Super Battles)	
Laura Sofia "Lauren"	Eliminated	Eliminated (Super Battles)	
Mathias Naranjo	Eliminated	Eliminated (Super Battles)	
Luisa Camila Zuñiga Aguilera "Jade"	Eliminated	Eliminated (Super Battles)	
Emanuel Caicedo	Eliminated	Eliminated (Super Battles)	
Manuel José Leal	Eliminated	Eliminated (Super Battles)	
Mary and Angela	Eliminated	Eliminated (Super Battles)	
Tamara Gordon	Eliminated	Eliminated (Super Battles)	
Sahian Maria	Eliminated	Eliminated (Super Battles)	
Maria Celeste Barrero Parra	Eliminated	Eliminated (Super Battles)	
Omar David Marcano Peña	Eliminated	Eliminated (Super Battles)	
Sara Castro Fuentes	Eliminated	Eliminated (Super Battles)	
Ángel Santiago	Eliminated	Eliminated (Super Battles)	
Diego Alejandro Zárate Gutiérrez	Eliminated	Eliminated (Super Battles)	
Sol Ángel Alvarado Nossa	Eliminated	Eliminated (Super Battles)	
Emmanuel Montes	Eliminated	Eliminated (Super Battles)	
Manuela Gomez	Eliminated	Eliminated (Super Battles)	
