= Calle Ilusión =

Studio album by Álex Ubago
- Released: March 10, 2009
- Recorded: 2009
- Genres: Pop; rock
- Label: Warner Music

Álex Ubago chronology
Aviones de cristal (2006)	Calle Ilusión (2009)	Mentiras Sinceras (2012)

Calle Ilusión is the fourth album from Álex Ubago. Released on March 10, 2009 in Spain, it was nominated for a Latin Grammy Award for Best Male Pop Vocal Album at the 10th Annual Latin Grammy Awards.

== Track listing ==
1. Amarrado a Ti (feat. Sharon Corr)
2. Me Arrepiento
3. Amsterdam
4. 20 Horas de Nada
5. Calle Ilusión
6. Ciudad Desierta
7. No Estás Sola
8. Demasiado Amor
9. Mil Horas
10. Cerca de Mí
11. Como Si Fuera El Último

== Charts ==
Chart performance for Calle Ilusión
Chart (2009)	Peak position
Spanish Albums (Promusicae)	3
