= Para Amarte Mejor =

Studio album by Andrés Cepeda
- Released: 2005
- Genre: Pop, Latin rock, Latin ballad
- Length: 39:34
- Label: FM Discos & Cintas

Andrés Cepeda chronology
| Cancion Rota (2003) | Para Amarte Mejor (2005) | Día Tras Día (2009) |

Alternative cover

Singles from Para Amarte Mejor
- 1. "Para Amarte Mejor"; 2. "Voy a Extrañarte"; 3. "No Tiene Sentido"; 4. "Si Fueras Mi Enemigo"

Para Amarte Mejor is the fourth studio album by the Colombian musician Andrés Cepeda the album was released in 2005 and has a 2007 re-issue with DVD.

== Track listing ==
| No. | Title | Writer(s) | Length |
|---|---|---|---|
| 1. | "Para Amarte Mejor" (pop) | Juan Gabriel Turbay | 3:37 |
| 2. | "Voy a Extrañarte" | Alfredo Nodarse | 2:43 |
| 3. | "No Tiene Sentido" | Alfredo Nodarse | 3:02 |
| 4. | "Ella Mintió" | Alfredo Nodarse | 3:24 |
| 5. | "Las Cuarenta" (Mariachi version) | Francisco Gorrindo; Roberto León | 3:32 |
| 6. | "Antes Que Te Vayas" | Alfredo Nodarse | 2:46 |
| 7. | "Me Está Tallando" | Jaime Andrés Castillo | 3:27 |
| 8. | "Día de Tristeza" | Maria Isabel Saavedra | 4:25 |
| 9. | "Para Amarte Mejor" (Acoustic) | Juan Gabriel Turbay | 3:33 |
| 10. | "Las Cuarenta" | Francisco Gorrindo; Roberto León | 3:16 |
| 11. | "Cómo Puede Ser" | Armando Manzanero | 3:26 |
| 12. | "No Tiene Sentido" (Acoustic) | Alfredo Nodarse | 2:23 |
| Total length: | | | 39:34 |

2007 reissue
| No. | Title | Writer(s) | Length |
|---|---|---|---|
| 1. | "Pronostico" | Jorge Luis Piloto | 3:40 |
| 2. | "Si Fueras Mi Enemigo" | Jorge Luis Piloto | 3:54 |
| 3. | "Para Amarte Mejor" (Salsa Version) | Juan Gabriel Turbay | 3:39 |
| 4. | "Voy A Extrañarte" | Alfredo Nodarse | 2:45 |
| 5. | "No Tiene Sentido" | Alfredo Nodarse | 3:04 |
| 6. | "Las Cuarenta" | Francisco Gorrindo; Roberto León | 3:16 |
| 7. | "Antes Que Te Vayas" | Alfredo Nodarse | 2:46 |
| 8. | "Me Está Tallando" | Jaime Andrés Castillo | 3:29 |
| 9. | "Día De Tristeza" | Maria Isabel Saavedra | 4:27 |
| 10. | "Cómo Puede Ser" | Armando Manzanero | 3:26 |
| Total length: | | | 34:26 |

2007 DVD
| No. | Title | Length |
|---|---|---|
| 1. | "Voy A Extrañarte" |
| 2. | "Carmelina" |
| 3. | "Canción Rota" |
| 4. | "No Tiene Sentido" |
| 5. | "Para Amarte Mejor" |

== Awards ==
The 2007 reissue album was nominated for the following 2007 Latin Grammy Awards: Best Male Pop Album.
