= Álex Ubago =

Spanish musician (born 1981)

Alex Ubago
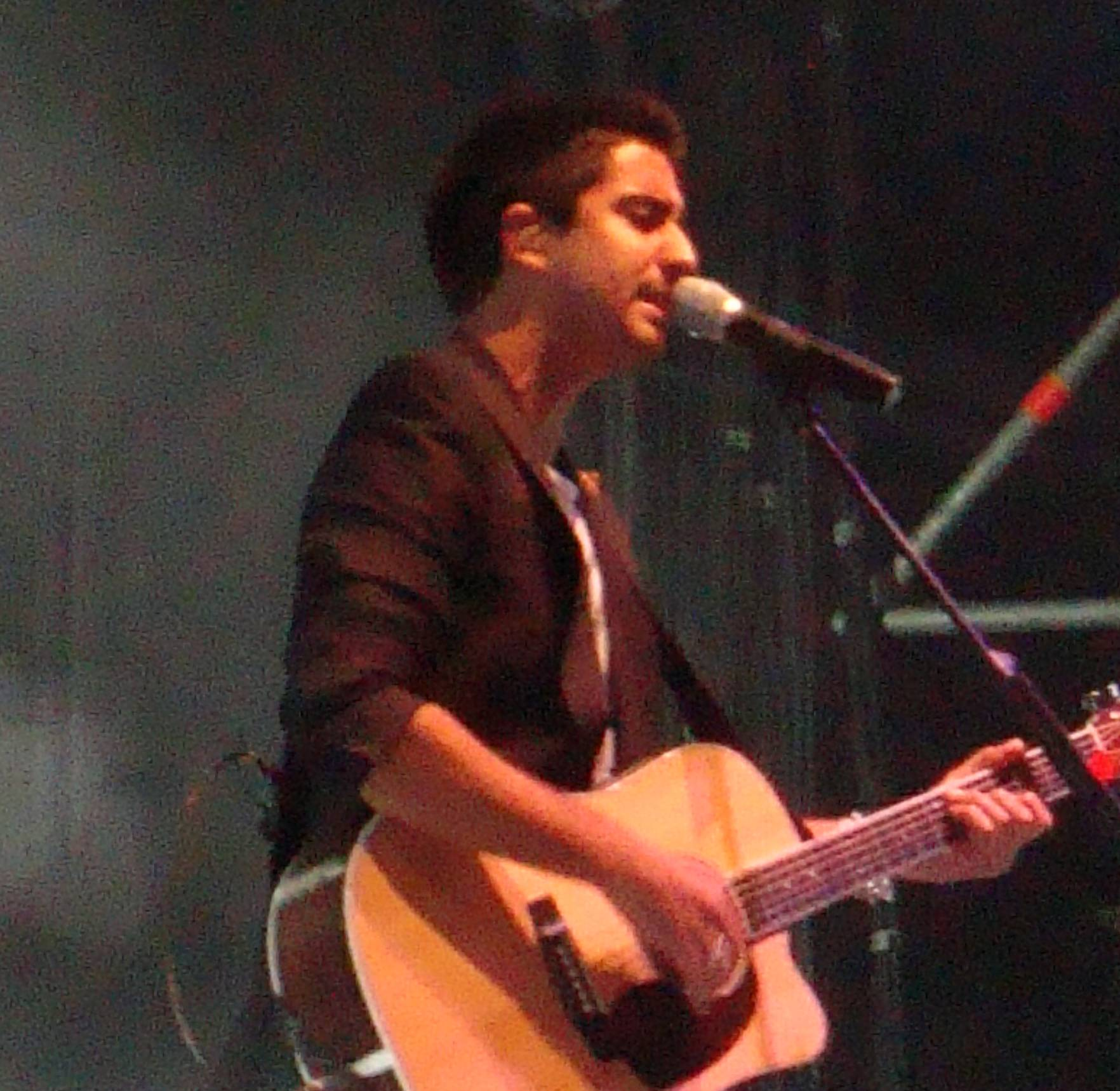
- Alex Ubago

Background information
- Born: Alejandro Martínez de Ubago Rodríguez; 29 January 1981 (age 45); Vitoria-Gasteiz, Álava, Spain
- Genres: Pop; pop rock
- Occupations: Musician; singer; songwriter
- Instruments: Vocals; guitar; piano
- Years active: 2000–present
- Member of: Alex, Jorge y Lena
- Website: www.alexubago.com

Álex Ubago (born Alejandro Martínez de Ubago Rodríguez on 29 January 1981) is a Spanish musician. He is especially known for his heartfelt voice and his ballads. He was able to record his debut album ¿Qué pides tú? when manager Iñigo Argomaniz that used to go to Alex's cousin's bar heard a demo that Alex made for his girlfriend. His first album contains songs from that first demo recording; the songs are "Sabes" and "Hay Que Ver". Alex started to tour national radios with his guitar to sing his songs live and get further exposure. Eventually, this strategy worked, and his album finally hit the charts. But he reached absolute fame with the publication of the song "Sin Miedo A Nada", featuring Amaia Montero, which is his biggest hit to date.

== Early life ==
When he was four years old, his parents moved to San Sebastián. He wrote his first song at the age of 15.

== Career ==
Álex Ubago taught himself to sing, and at the age of 20 released his debut album ¿Qué pides tú?, which sold 900,000 units in Spain and was certified 9× platinum in Mexico. Ubago received a Latin Grammy Award nomination for Best New Artist in 2003, but the award was won by fellow Spanish performer David Bisbal. Ubago's album Fantasía o realidad was released in 2003, and was as successful as his first album. Ubago was nominated again for a Latin Grammy Award for Best Male Pop Vocal Album for his album Calle Ilusión which peaked at number three in the Spanish Albums Charts.

In 2019, he collaborated in the CD edited by La Marató de TV3, a telethon devoted to raise funds for the research of incurable diseases, with a version in Catalan of his song "Sin miedo a nada".

== Discography ==
=== Albums ===
List of albums, with selected chart positions and certifications
Title	Album details	Peak chart positions		Certifications
Title	Album details	SPN	ARG	Certifications
¿Qué pides tú?	Released: September 23, 2001	1	—	ARG: Platinum; MEX: 2× Platinum; SPA: 9× Platinum
21 meses, 1 semana y 2 días	Released: July 21, 2003	1	—	
Fantasía o realidad	Released: February 24, 2004	1	—	ARG: Gold; MEX: Platinum+Gold; SPA: 3× Platinum; US: Platinum (Latin)
Álex Ubago: En Directo	Released: August 20, 2004	6	—	
Aviones de cristal	Released: September 26, 2006	3	61	MEX: Gold; SPA: Gold
Calle Ilusión	Released: March 10, 2009	3	3	
Mentiras Sinceras	Released: December 4, 2012	16	—	
Canciones Impuntuales	Released: May 5, 2017	14	—	
"—" denotes album that did not chart or was not released
