= Latin Grammy Award for Best Male Pop Vocal Album =

Honor presented annually at the Latin Grammy Awards from 2001 to 2011

- Awarded for: recordings of the pop genre by male performers
- Country: United States
- Presented by: The Latin Recording Academy
- First award: 2001
- Final award: 2011
- Website: latingrammy.com

The Latin Grammy Award for Best Male Pop Vocal Album was an honor presented annually at the Latin Grammy Awards from 2001 to 2011. The award was given to a male performer for albums containing at least 51% of new recordings of the pop genre. Since its inception, the award category has had several name changes. In 2000 it was presented as Best Male Pop Vocal Performance. The following year onwards the award is known as Best Male Pop Vocal Album.

Spanish artists have won the award more times than any other nationality, though award-winning albums have also been performed by musicians originating from Argentina, Colombia, Guatemala, Mexico, Puerto Rico and Venezuela. The award for Best Male Pop Vocal Performance was presented in 2000 to Mexican singer Luis Miguel for "Tu Mirada". No Es Lo Mismo and Paraíso Express, recorded by Alejandro Sanz, Adentro, performed by Ricardo Arjona and La Vida... Es un Ratico by Juanes, received the award and also earned the Grammy Award for Best Latin Pop Album. Sanz is the most awarded singer in the category with three accolades, while performers Marc Anthony, Alejandro Lerner and Marco Antonio Solís share the record for most nominations without a win, with three each.

== Recipients ==
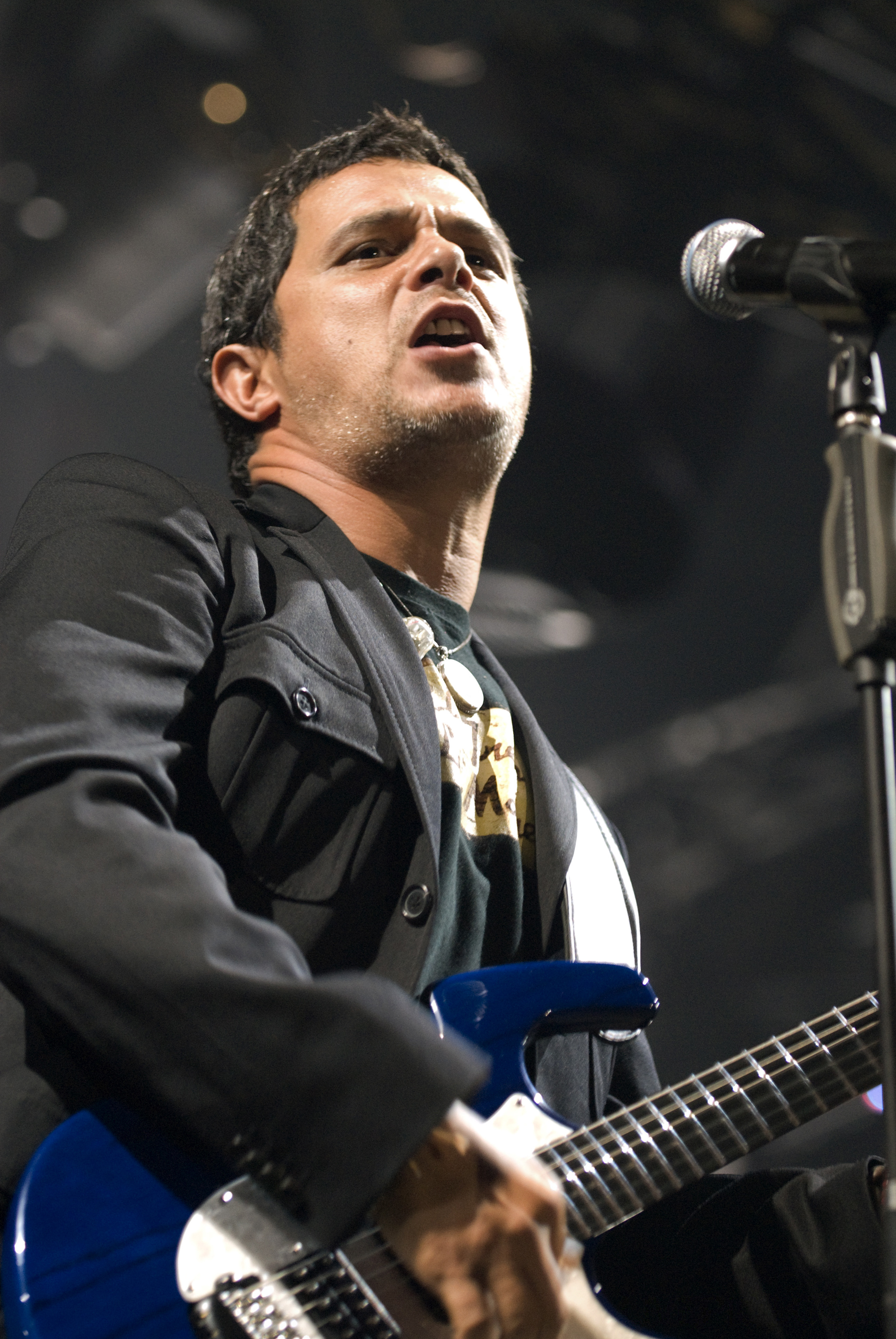
Alejandro Sanz is the most awarded performer in this category with three wins, winning in 2001, 2004 and 2010.

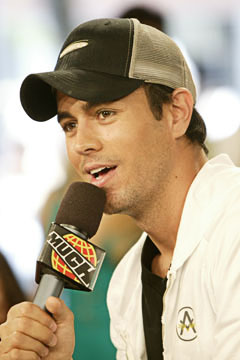
Enrique Iglesias won the award in 2003 for Quizás.

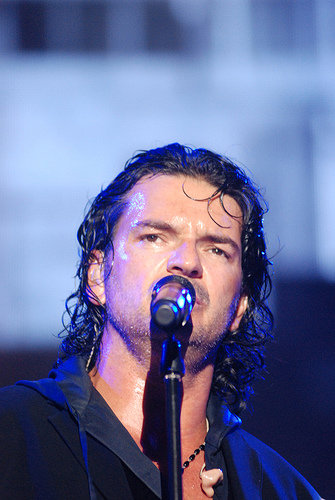
2006 winner Ricardo Arjona

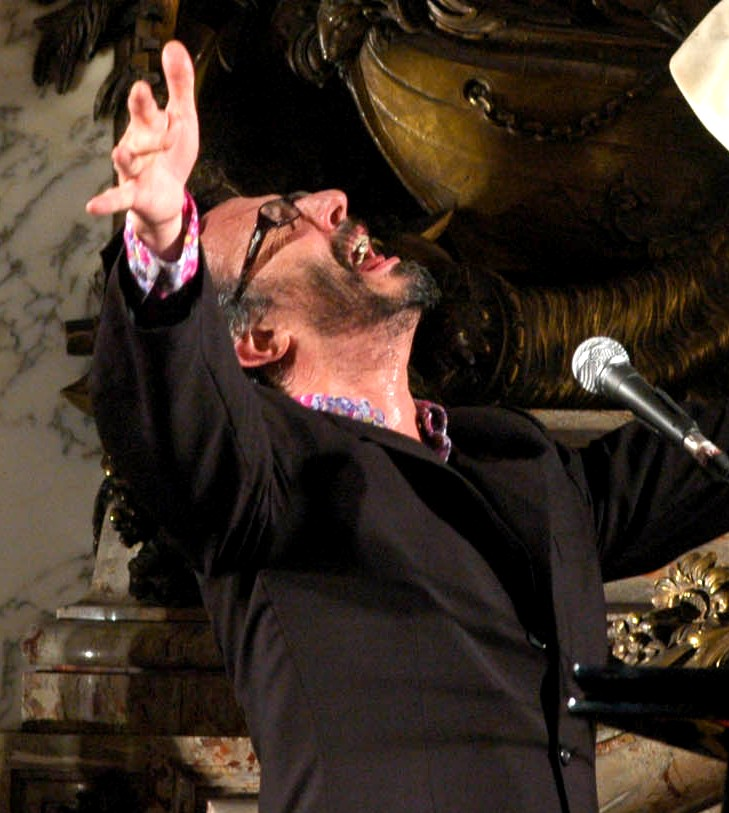
Fito Páez won the award in 2009 for the live album No sé si es Baires o Madrid.

=== 2000s ===
Year^{[I]}	Performing artist(s)	Work	Nominees^{[II]}	Ref.
2000	Luis Miguel	"Tu Mirada"	Marc Anthony – "Dímelo"; Alejandro Fernández – "Quiéreme"; Ricky Martin – "Bella"; Carlos Vives – "Fruta Fresca"	
2001	Alejandro Sanz	El Alma al Aire	Pedro Guerra – Ofrenda; Luis Miguel – Vivo; Alejandro Lerner – Si Quieres Saber Quién Soy; Antonio Vega – De un Lugar Perdido	
2002	Miguel Bosé	Sereno	Jorge Drexler – Sea; Alejandro Lerner – Lerner Vivo; Marco Antonio Solís – Más de Mi Alma; Gian Marco Zignago – A Tiempo	
2003	Enrique Iglesias	Quizás	Ricardo Arjona – Santo Pecado; David Bisbal – Corazón Latino; Alexandre Pires – Estrella Guía; Joan Manuel Serrat – Versos en La Boca	
2004	Alejandro Sanz	No Es Lo Mismo	Obie Bermúdez – Confesiones; David Bisbal – Bulería; Ricky Martin – Almas del Silencio; Luis Miguel – 33	
2005	Obie Bermúdez	Todo el Año	Marc Anthony – Amar Sin Mentiras; Franco De Vita – Stop; Alejandro Fernández – A Corazón Abierto; Marco Antonio Solís – Razón de Sobra	
2006	Ricardo Arjona	Adentro	Andrea Bocelli – Amor; Chayanne – Cautivo; Luis Fonsi – Paso a Paso; Ricardo Montaner – Todo y Nada	
2007	Ricky Martin	MTV Unplugged	Miguel Bosé – Papito; Andrés Cepeda – Para Amarte Mejor; Franco De Vita – Mil y Una Historias En Vivo; Aleks Syntek – Lección de Vuelo	
2008	Juanes	La Vida... Es un Ratico	Ricardo Arjona – Quién Dijo Ayer; Jeremías – Un día más en el gran circo; Alejandro Lerner – Enojado; Gian Marco Zignago – Desde Adentro	
2009	Fito Páez	No sé si es Baires o Madrid	Andrés Cepeda – Día Tras Día; Francisco Céspedes – Te Acuerdas...; Coti – Malditas Canciones; Álex Ubago – Calle Ilusión	

=== 2010s ===
Year^{[I]}	Performing artist(s)	Work	Nominees^{[II]}	Ref.
2010	Alejandro Sanz	Paraíso Express	Marc Anthony – Iconos; Alex Cuba – Alex Cuba; Joaquín Sabina – Vinagre y Rosas; Aleks Syntek – Métodos de Placer Instantáneo	
2011	Franco De Vita	En Primera Fila	Pablo Alborán – Pablo Alborán; Reyli Barba – Bien Acompañado; Cristian Castro – Viva el Príncipe; Marco Antonio Solís – En Total Plenitud	

^{^[I]} Each year is linked to the article about the Latin Grammy Awards held that year.

== See also ==
- Grammy Award for Best Male Pop Vocal Performance
- Latin Grammy Award for Best Female Pop Vocal Album
- Latin Grammy Award for Best Pop Vocal Album, Duo or Group
- Latin Grammy Award for Best Contemporary Pop Vocal Album
- Latin Grammy Award for Best Traditional Pop Vocal Album
