= Aviones de cristal =

Aviones De Cristal

Studio album by Alex Ubago
- Released: September 26, 2006 (SPN)
- Recorded: 2005 / 2006
- Genre: Pop- rock
- Label: Warner Music

Alex Ubago chronology
| Álex Ubago: En Directo (2004) | Aviones De Cristal (2006) | Calle Ilusión (2009) |

Aviones de cristal, is the third studio album from Alex Ubago. It was released on September 25, 2006, in Spain. It was certified Gold in both Spain and Mexico.

Sigo Buscando ("Still Searching") peaked at number 32 on Los 40 (Spain) charts.

== Track listing ==
=== CD ===
| No. | Title | Length |
|---|---|---|
| 1. | "Sigo Buscando" | 4:47 |
| 2. | "Viajar Contigo" | 3:33 |
| 3. | "Cada Día" | 5:01 |
| 4. | "La Estación" | 4:53 |
| 5. | "María" | 4:21 |
| 6. | "Aviones de Cristal" | 4:37 |
| 7. | "Si Tú Me Llevas" | 4:40 |
| 8. | "El Único Habitante" | 4:15 |
| 9. | "No Dices Nada" | 4:03 |
| 10. | "Reinas de la Fiesta" | 4:20 |
| 11. | "Instantes" | 4:29 |
| 12. | "Como en Los Sueños" | 4:37 |
| Total length: | | 53:36 |

=== DVD ===
| No. | Title | Length |
|---|---|---|
| 1. | "Cómo se grabó" |
| 2. | "Cómo se rodó" |
| 3. | "Viajar contigo" (videoclip) |
| 4. | "Viajar contigo" (videoclip con banda) |
| 5. | "Viajar contigo" (Videoclip proyección) |

== Charts ==
| Chart (2006–2007) | Peak position |
|---|---|
| Spanish Albums (PROMUSICAE) | 3 |

== Sales and certifications ==
| Region | Certification | Certified units/sales |
|---|---|---|
| Mexico (AMPROFON) | Gold | 50,000^{^} |
| Spain (PROMUSICAE) | Gold | 40,000^{^} |
^{^} Shipments figures based on certification alone.
