= ¿Qué pides tú? =

¿Qué Pides Tú?

Studio album by Alex Ubago
- Released: September 23, 2001
- Recorded: 2001
- Genre: Pop
- Label: Warner Music

Alex Ubago chronology
¿Qué Pides Tú? (2001)	21 Meses, 1 Semana y 2 Dias (2003)

¿Qué pides tú? (What do you ask for?) is the debut studio album title from Alex Ubago. It was released on September 23, 2001, in Spain in the middle of the Operación Triunfo boom (despite Ubago's isolation from the reality programme itself). It was certified 9× Platinum in Spain, 2× Platinum in México, Platinum in Argentina and in 2007 Platinum in Europe. It is the best selling album of Ubago's career, with more than 1.5 million copies sold worldwide.

== Track listing ==
1. ¿Qué Pides Tú? (What Do You Ask For?)
2. A Gritos De Esperanza (Screams of Hope)
3. ¿Sabes? (You Know?)
4. No Te Rindas (Don't give up)
5. Hay Que Ver (One must see)
6. Sin Miedo A Nada (Without fear of anything)
7. Ahora Que No Estás (Now that you are not here)
8. Por Esta Ciudad (In this city)
9. Vuelves A Pensar (Think Again)
10. Dime Si No Es Amor (Tell me if it isn't love)

== Sales and certifications ==
Region	Certification	Certified units/sales
Argentina (CAPIF)	Platinum	40,000^{^}
Mexico (AMPROFON)	2× Platinum	300,000^{^}
Spain (PROMUSICAE)	9× Platinum	900,000^{^}
Summaries
Europe (IFPI)	Platinum	1,000,000^{*}
Worldwide	—	1,500,000
^{*} Sales figures based on certification alone.^{^} Shipments figures based on certification alone.

== See also ==
- List of best-selling albums in Spain
