= Mentiras Sinceras =

2012 album

Studio album by Álex Ubago
- Released: December 4, 2012
- Label: WEA Latina

Álex Ubago chronology
Calle Ilusión (2009)	Mentiras Sinceras (2012)	Canciones Impuntuales (2017)

Mentiras Sinceras (lit. "Sincere Lies") is the fifth studio album by Spanish singer-songwriter Álex Ubago. It was released by WEA Latina on December 4, 2012.

== Production ==
It was recorded in Milan, Italy at Claudio Guidetti's studio between July and August 2012. The album features the collaboration of Lele Melotti and Paolo Costa, with whom he worked on his second record material Fantasía o Realidad, under the production of Jesús N. Gomez.

Promotion began on the album with the release of an EP made up of the songs "Ella vive en mí", "Mentiras sinceras" and "Being with you", the latter being a solo version that was originally released when Ubago was part of the group "Alex, Jorge and Lena", with whom he got his first Latin Grammy.

Mentiras Sinceras was released in physical format in Spain and in digital format for Latin America and the rest of the world. The physical format for Latin America was launched in March 2013.

== Track listing ==
1. "Ella vive en mí" - 3:27
2. "Dueños de este mundo" - 3:23
3. "Nunca dejé de creer" - 3:55
4. "Destinados" - 4:00
5. "No me dejes afuera" - 3:26
6. "Detrás de un cristal" - 3:44
7. "Amores de papel" - 3:40
8. "Mientras tú me quieras" - 4:10
9. "Puedes ser tú" - 3:55
10. "Mentiras sinceras" - 3:16
11. "Estar contigo" - 3:53
12. "Para aprenderte" - 4:26
13. "Nada que dar" (iTunes)

Bonus tracks 2014

1. "Somos Familia"
2. "Dueños de este mundo" (featuring Efecto Mariposa)»

== Charts ==
Chart performance for Mentiras Sinceras
Chart (2012–2013)	Peak position
Spanish Albums (PROMUSICAE)	16
US Top Latin Albums (Billboard)	15
US Latin Pop Albums (Billboard)	7
US Heatseekers Albums (Billboard)	19
