= Miranda (Colombian singer) =

Colombian singer

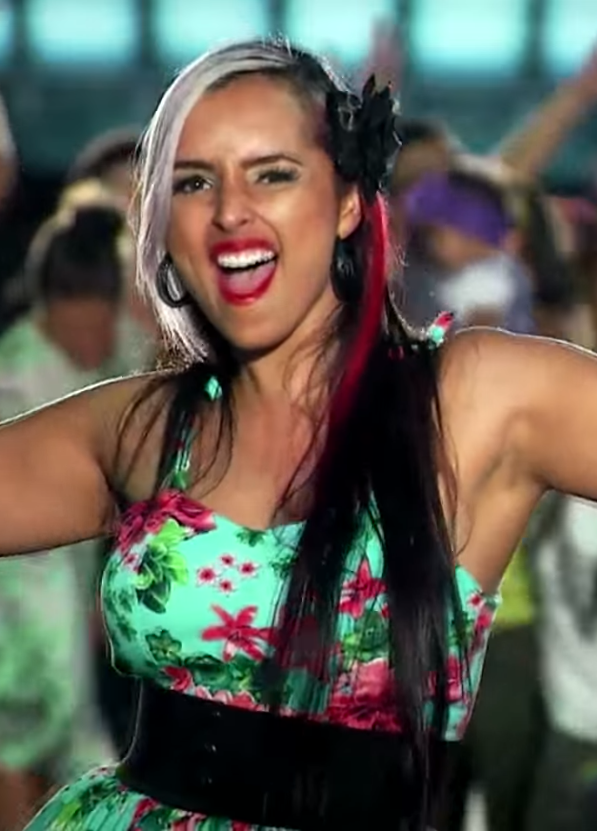
- Miranda in 2015

Background information
- Born: Lady Diana Miranda Cardona; November 20, 1984 (age 41); Bello, Antioquia, Colombia
- Genres: Latin pop; R&B; soul; jazz; Christian
- Occupation: Singer-songwriter
- Label: Universal Music

Lady Diana Cardona Miranda (November 20, 1984), better known as Miranda, is a Colombian singer. At 27 years old she appeared in the first season of Colombian musical competition La Voz Colombia, and was part of Team Ricardo Montaner winning the contest on the final held on December 20, 2012; She received a monetary prize, a contract with the label Universal Music, in addition to sharing the stage with Carlos Vives and Alejandro Sanz in Feria de Manizales. Miranda is also the vocalist of her band Miranda & the Soul Band. She was nominated for Latin Grammy Award for Best New Artist.

== Career ==
Miranda was born in Bello, Antioquia, on November 20, 1984. Her mother was a physiotherapist by profession and a Christian believer. As a teenager, Miranda always had a strong inclination for music, and spent almost 14 years related to music. She became the winner of The Voice Colombia. She studied at the University of Antioquia. But she soon left a possible professional career to start an artistic career. She also worked as a professor of vocal techniques, at Solo Rock Musical academy in Medellín. Prior to taking part in La Voz Colombia, she formed a band called Miranda & The Soul Band in 2009, with her group still remaining in force.

On December 20, 2012, she won La Voz Colombia title, where she was mentored by the Venezuelan singer Ricardo Montaner She got 32.8% of the vote, winning a record contract from Universal Music to record an album. she also got a monetary prize of 300m pesos, equivalent to $135,000.

The song "Rolling in the Deep," a cover of Adele was her debut single and appeared on the album Lo Mejor de la Voz... Colombia, a compilation of the best performances during season 1 of the show. It debuted at the top position in local iTunes chart.

In early December 2013, the Colombian singer released her first studio album, Alma .

Miranda has appeared at various important events. In mid-October 2012, during Festival Internacional Altavoz, she was invited to share the stage with renowned local and international bands. On January 12, 2013, the artist was the opening act for Carlos Vives and Alejandro Sanz in a concert held in Manizales, during the 57th version of the Feria de Manizales and in Premios India Catalina. On February 23, 2013, she performed during the India Catalina Awards in Cartagena, Colombia and again on March 8, 2013, at Teletón Colombia.

== Discography ==
=== Albums ===
- Alma (2013)

Other albums

- Miranda & La Soul Band
- Lo Mejor de la Voz... Colombia

=== Singles ===
- "¿Por qué?"
- "El Gran Secreto"
- "Cuidando de Ti"
- "Eterno" (feat. Dj Elektrik)

== Awards and nominations ==
Ilona awards and nominations
Awards and nominations
Award	Wins	Nominations
Latin Grammy Awards	0	1
Premios Shock	1	2

Totals (Note: Certain award groups do not simply award one winner. They acknowledge several different recipients, have runners-up, and have third place. Since this is a specific recognition and is different from losing an award, runner-up mentions are considered wins in this award tally. For simplification and to avoid errors, each award in this list has been presumed to have had a prior nomination.)
- Wins: 1
- Nominations: 3

=== Latin Grammy Awards ===
A Latin Grammy Award is an accolade by the Latin Academy of Recording Arts & Sciences to recognize outstanding achievement in the music industry.

Year	Nominee / work	Award	Result
2014	Miranda	Best New Artist	Nominated

=== Premios Shock ===
Shock Awards are the most important awards in Colombia.

Year	Nominee / work	Award	Result
2013	¿Por qué?	Best New Female Solo Artist	Won
2014	El Gran Secreto	Best Solo	Nominated

Preceded by N/A	La Voz Colombia Winner; 2012	Succeeded by Camilo Martínez

Awards
Preceded by Maluma; Mojito Lite; Miltón Salcedo	Colombian Artist for Best New Artist Latin Grammy; 2014; Miranda; Juan Pablo Vega	Succeeded by Incumbent
