= Fantasía o realidad =

Fantasía o Realidad

Studio album by Alex Ubago
- Released: February 24, 2004
- Recorded: 2003
- Genre: Pop
- Label: Warner Music

Alex Ubago chronology
21 Meses, 1 Semana y 2 Dias (2003)	Fantasía o Realidad (2004)	Álex Ubago: En Directo (2004)

Fantasía o realidad is the second studio album from Álex Ubago. It was released on February 24, 2004; the album was commercially successful, being certified 3× Platinum in Spain, Platinum+Gold in Mexico, Platinum (Latin) in the United States and Gold in Argentina.

== Track listing ==
1. Aunque no te pueda ver
2. Fantasía o realidad
3. Dame tu aire
4. Prefiero
5. Cuanto antes
6. Otro día más
7. Allí estaré
8. Despertar
9. Lo más grande
10. Por tantas cosas
11. Salida
12. No soy yo

== Alternate version ==
Two different versions of the album were released. The original released in Spain contained two different songs than the version released in the rest of the world. The two songs are “Lo más grande” and “No soy yo”.

== Charts ==
Chart (2004–2005)	Peak position
Spanish Albums (PROMUSICAE)	78
US Top Latin Albums (Billboard)	14
US Latin Pop Albums (Billboard)	7
US Heatseekers Albums (Billboard)	32

== Sales and certifications ==
Region	Certification	Certified units/sales
Argentina (CAPIF)	Gold	20,000^{^}
Mexico (AMPROFON)	Platinum+Gold	150,000^{^}
Spain (PROMUSICAE)	3× Platinum	300,000^{^}
United States (RIAA)	Platinum (Latin)	100,000^{^}
^{^} Shipments figures based on certification alone.
