= Día tras día (album) =

Día Tras Día

Studio album by Andrés Cepeda
- Released: October 27, 2009
- Genre: Pop, Latin rock, Latin ballad
- Length: 53:48
- Label: FM Discos & Cintas
- Producer: Andrés Cepeda, Fredy Camelo Salamanca

Andrés Cepeda chronology
Para Amarte Mejor (2005)	Día Tras Día (2009)	Vivo en Directo (2010)

Alternative cover

Singles from Día Tras Día
- 1. "Besos Usados"; 2. "Enfermedad de Ti"; 3. "Día Tras Día"

Día Tras Día is the fifth studio album by the Colombian musician Andrés Cepeda the album is written in collaboration with the Cuban musician Amaury Gutiérrez.

== Track listing ==
No.	Title	Writer(s)	Length
1.	"Día Tras Día"	Jorge Luis Piloto; Joel Enríquez	4:03
2.	"Enfermedad de Ti"	Amaury Gutiérrez	3:08
3.	"Besos Usados"	Paloma Ramírez; Alejandro Martínez	3:54
4.	"Bandida"	Piloto; Cepeda	2:51
5.	"Sombras"	Rosario Sansores Pren	3:05
6.	"Fallaste"	Alfredo Nodarse	3:46
7.	"Así de Grande"	Alexis Valdez	3:52
8.	"Faltarán"	Gabriel Turbay	3:13
9.	"No Es Casual"	Piloto	3:31
10.	"Se Te Nota"	Yasmil Marrufo	3:38
11.	"Hoy Como Tu"	Nodarse	3:35
12.	"Me Sacaste de la Casa"	José Rodríguez	2:14
13.	"Ya No Me Sabe Igual"	Nodarse	3:58
14.	"Tanto, Tanto"	Nodarse	2:43
15.	"Necesito"	Iván Benavides	6:17
Total length:			53:48

== Awards ==
The album was nominated for the following 2009 Latin Grammy Awards:

- Album of the Year: Día Tras Día
- Song of the Year: "Día Tras Día" - Yoel Henríquez and Jorge Luis Piloto, songwriters
- Best Male Pop Vocal Album: Día Tras Día
