= Laura Tobón =

Colombian presenter, model, singer and YouTuber

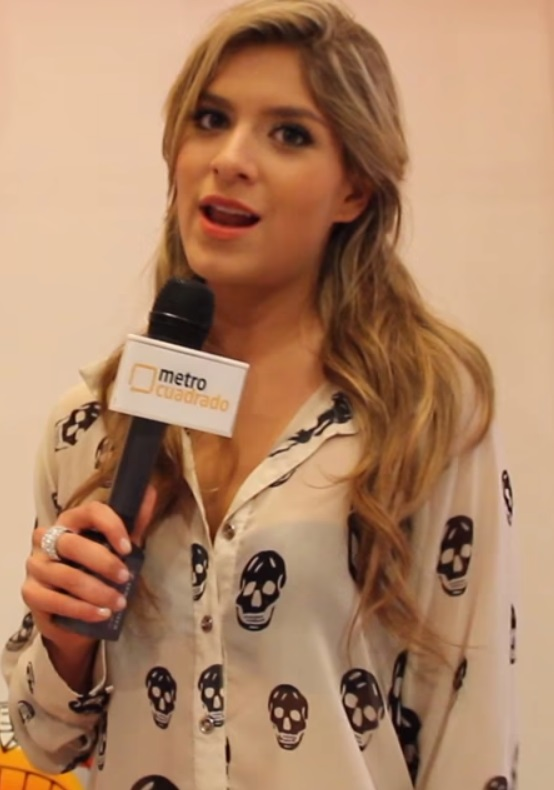
- Laura Tobón in 2017
- Born: Laura María Tobón Yepes; 5 January 1990 (age 36); Bogotá, Colombia
- Education: Pontifical Xavierian University
- Occupations: Presenter, singer, model, YouTuber
- Years active: 2010–present
- Awards: TVyNovelas Award (2016, 2018)

Laura María Tobón Yepes (born 5 January 1990) is a Colombian presenter, model, singer, and YouTuber.

== Early life ==
Laura Tobón was born in Bogotá on 5 January 1990, the daughter of Jairo Tobón and Gina Yepes. She graduated from the Colegio Andino in 2008, and studied social communication with an emphasis in journalism at the Pontifical Xavierian University.

She began her career as a model at age 15. She was represented by the agency RCN Models, and later moved to Grupo4. She now models independently. She has appeared in fashion shows at many of the country's prominent catwalks, such as Colombia Moda, Cali Exposhow, and Ixel Moda.

She married businessman Álvaro Rodríguez in 2017.

== Television career ==
In 2011, Tobón participated in the contest Chica E! Colombia, in which she was a finalist. Following this, she was the presenter of RCN's La Rueda de la Fortuna contest. Months later, she became a presenter for the channel's entertainment department. In 2016, she presented La voz Teens with Karen Martínez.

In 2017, she became the presenter of the Discovery Home & Health program Dile sí al Vestido, and in 2018 she presented La Vuelta al mundo en 80 risas and the third season of La voz Kids on Caracol Televisión.

== YouTube ==
After leaving television, Tobón decided to start her own YouTube channel, where she uploads content that relates experiences from her personal and professional life. In 2015, she launched a line of swimwear called Laura Tobón by Milonga, demonstrating her versatility as a designer and businesswoman. In 2016, she released her book La magia está dentro de ti, in which she addresses issues about happiness and inner tranquility from her personal history.

In 2018, she celebrated her channel reaching 200,000 subscribers by releasing a cover of the Piso 21 song "La vida sin ti".

She also appeared in both the English and Spanish versions of Luis Fonsi's song "Sola" from his album Vida.

== Awards ==
In 2016, she received the TVyNovelas Award for Best Show Business Presenter. She won again for Best Variety Presenter in 2018.

== Books ==
- La magia está dentro de ti (2016), Penguin Random House, ISBN 9789588912585
