= Andrés Cepeda =

Colombian musical artist

Andrés Cepeda Cediel
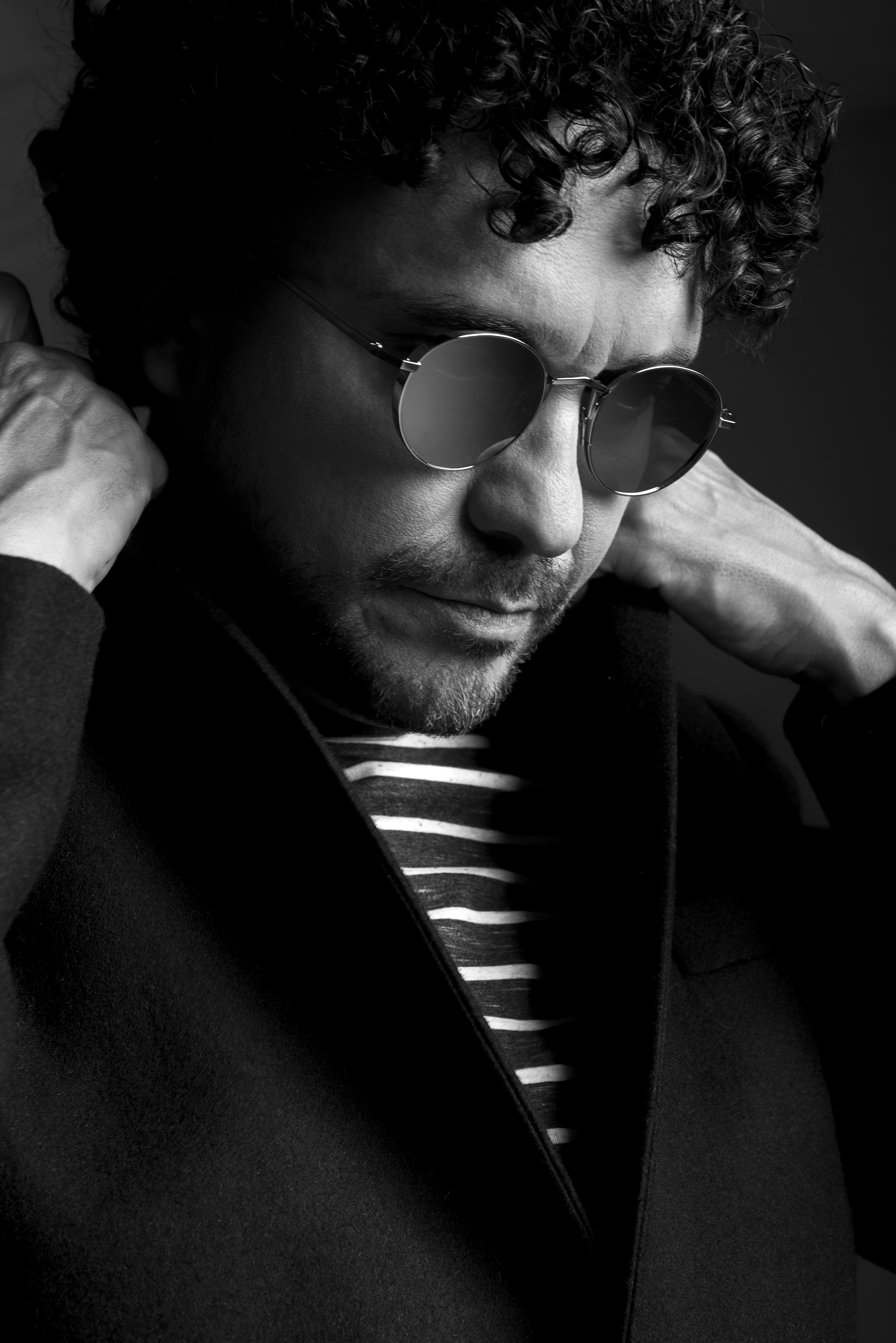
- Cepeda in promotional shoot in 2018

Background information
- Born: July 7, 1973 (age 53)
- Origin: Bogotá, Colombia
- Genres: Latin; Pop; Jazz; Rock
- Occupations: Singer; songwriter; musician
- Instruments: Guitar; Keyboards; Vocals
- Years active: 1989–present
- Labels: FM Discos & Cintas (1999–2013); Sony Music (2014–present)

Andrés Cepeda Cediel (born July 7, 1973) is a popular Colombian singer-songwriter. He was born in Bogotá, the youngest of five children. He displayed an inclination towards music from an early age, studying piano since the age of 5. He composed his first piece at the age of 12. He studied at Colegio San Carlos and later at Colegio Emilio Valenzuela. His musical career began as the lead voice of Poligamia, a latin rock-pop group which he founded with some friends during his adolescence. After Poligamia was disbanded, Cepeda continued with his musical career as a soloist, finding success in different musical genres such as bolero and Balada, among other romantic genres. His album El carpintero achieved quadruple-platinum sales in Colombia.

== Discography ==
=== With Poligamia ===
- Una Canción (1993)
- Vueltas y Vueltas (1995)
- Promotal 500 mg (1996)
- Buenas Gracias, Muchas Noches (1998) – Farewell Concert

=== Solo Work ===
==== Albums ====
- Sé Morir (1999)
- El Carpintero (2001)
- Siempre Queda Una Canción (2002)
- Canción Rota (2003)
- Para Amarte Mejor (2006)
- Pop Latino (2007)
- Día Tras Día (2009)
- Lo Mejor Que Hay En Mi Vida (2012)
- Mil Ciudades (2015)
- TRECE (2020)
- Me Estás Haciendo Falta (2021)
- Décimo Cuarto (2023)

== Filmography ==
- La Voz Colombia (Coach), 2012
- La Voz Colombia (Coach), 2013
- La Voz Colombia (Coach), 2014
- Encanto at the Hollywood Bowl, 2022

== Awards and nominations ==
=== Latin Grammy Awards ===
A Latin Grammy Award is an accolade by the Latin Academy of Recording Arts & Sciences to recognize outstanding achievement in the music industry. Andres Cepeda has received one award from eight nominations.

Year	Nominee / work	Award	Result
2007	Para Amarte Mejor	Best Male Pop Vocal Album	Nominated
2009	Día tras día	Album of the Year	Nominated
2009	Día tras día	Song of the Year	Nominated
2009	Día tras día	Best Male Pop Vocal Album	Nominated
2013	Lo Mejor Que Hay En Mi Vida	Album of the Year	Nominated
2013	Lo Mejor Que Hay En Mi Vida	Song of the Year	Nominated
2013	Lo Mejor Que Hay En Mi Vida	Record of the Year	Nominated
2013	Lo Mejor Que Hay En Mi Vida	Best Traditional Pop Vocal Album	Won

== Premios 40 Principales ==
Premios 40 Principales is an awards ceremony hosted annually by the Spanish radio channel Los 40 Principales.

Year	Nominee / work	Award	Result
2007	Andrés Cepeda	Best Colombian Act	Nominated
2009	Andrés Cepeda	Best Colombian Act	Won

== Premios TVyNovelas ==
Year	Nominee / work	Award	Result
2014	Andrés Cepeda By La Voz Colombia 2	Best Jury	Won
