= The Voice (Russian TV series) season 3 =

The Voice
- Season 3
- Presented by: Dmitry Nagiev
- Coaches: Leonid Agutin; Pelageya; Alexander Gradsky; Dima Bilan
- Winner: Alexandra Vorobyova
- Winning coach: Alexander Gradsky
- Runner-up: Yaroslav Dronov

Release
- Original network: Channel One
- Original release: 5 September – 26 December 2014

Season chronology
- ← Previous; Season 2 Next → Season 4

The third season of the Russian reality talent show The Voice premiered on September 5, 2014 on Channel One. Dmitry Nagiev returned as the show's presenter for his third seasons. Dima Bilan, Pelageya, Alexander Gradsky, and Leonid Agutin returned as the coach's for their third seasons.

Alexandra Vorobyova was announced the winner on December 26, 2014, marking Alexander Gradsky's third win as a coach, thus expanding his winning streak to third seasons in a row.

== Coaches and presenter ==
The Voice season 3 coaching panel and presenter

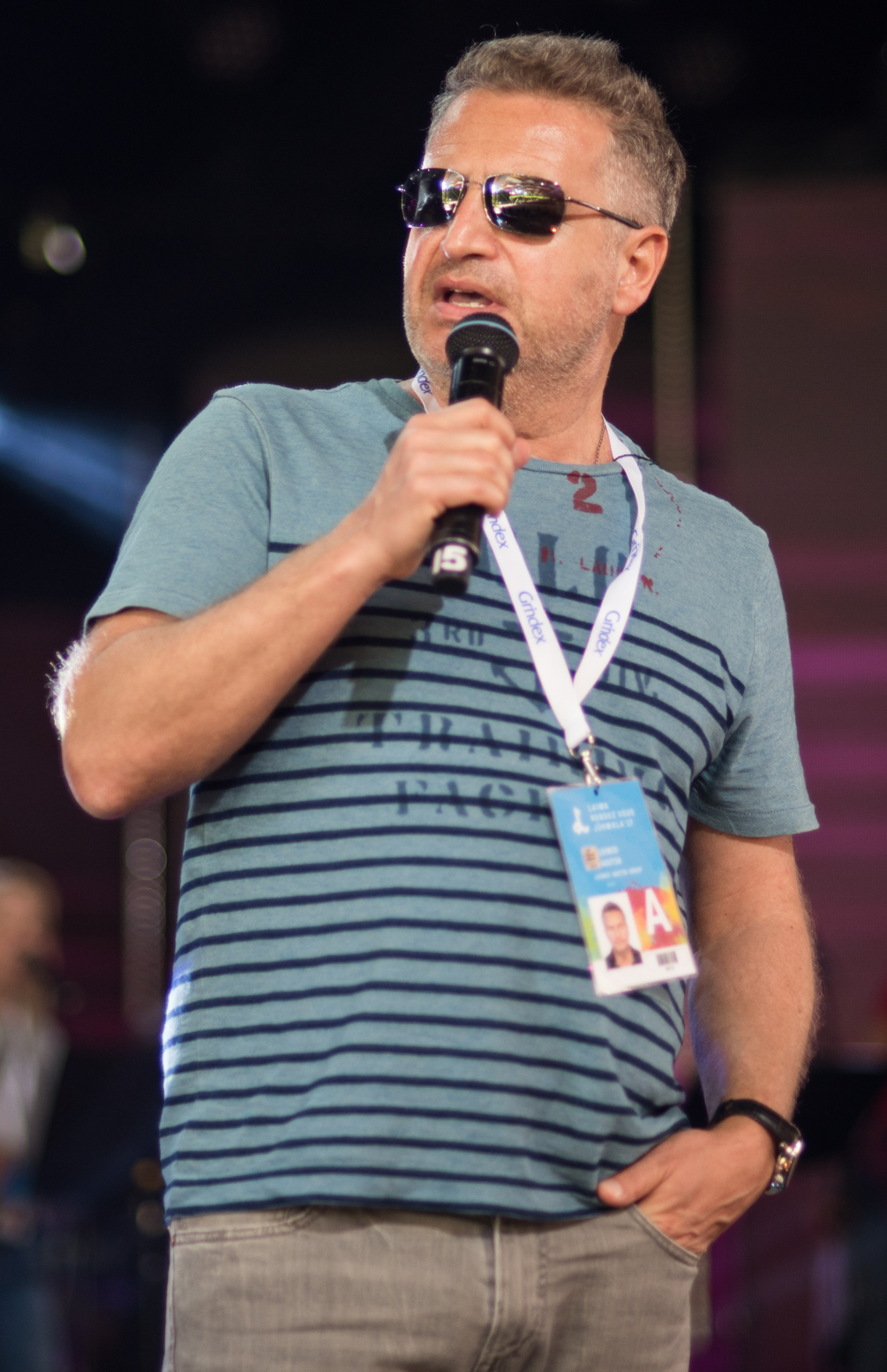
Leonid Agutin

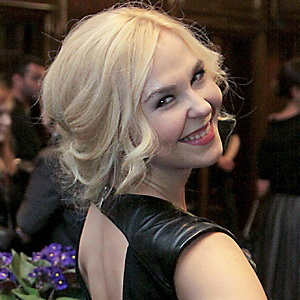
Pelageya

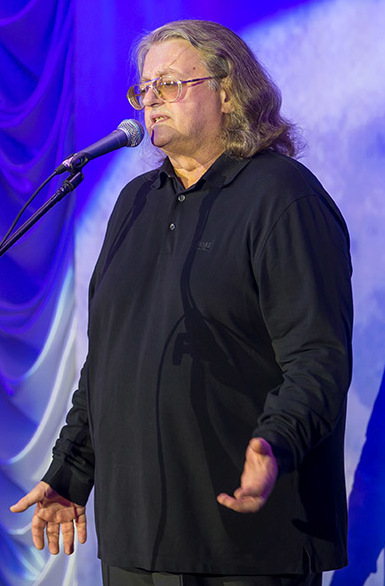
Alexander Gradsky

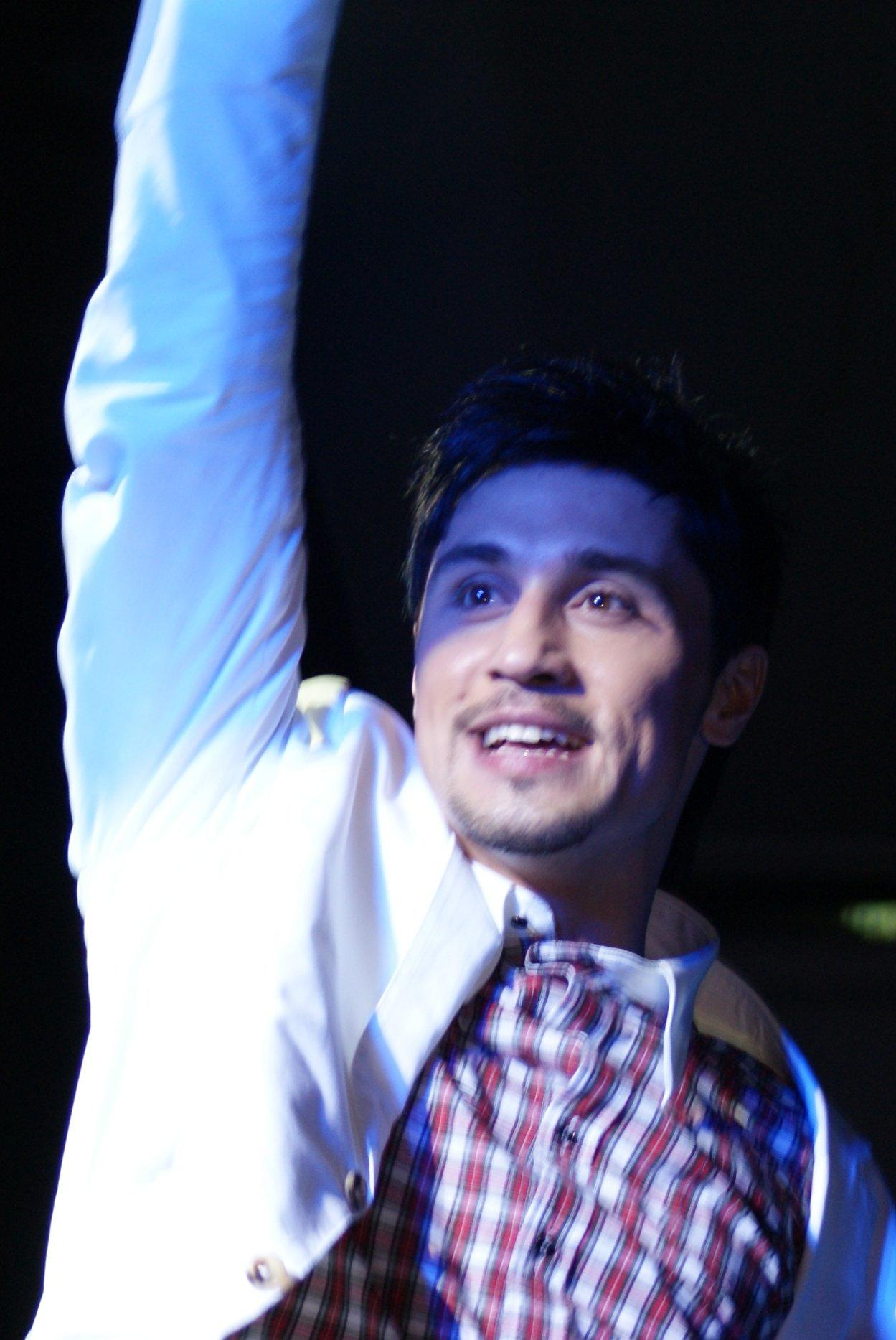
Dima Bilan

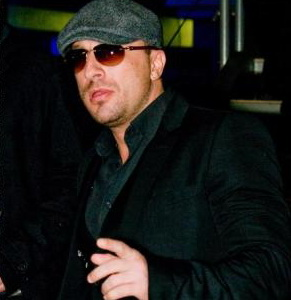
Dmitry Nagiev

Leonid Agutin, Pelageya, Alexander Gradsky, and Dima Bilan return for their third season as coaches. Dmitry Nagiev returns for his third season as a presenter.

== Teams ==
Colour key

- Winner
- Runner-up
- Third place
- Fourth place
- Eliminated in the Semifinal
- Eliminated in the Quarterfinals
- Eliminated in the Knockout rounds
- Stolen in the Battle rounds
- Eliminated in the Battles rounds

Coaches	Top 57 artists					
Leonid Agutin	Mariam Merabova	Intars Busulis	Artur Best	Lyudmila Sokolova	Georgy Yufa	Andrey Grizli
Leonid Agutin	Mariya Zaytseva	Sofia Rubina Hunter	Samvel Vardanyan	~~Diana Sharapova~~	~~Sevil Velieva~~	Michael Blaise
Leonid Agutin	Vladimir Stepanyants	Kseniya Buzina	Ntantie Mari Nzhipuakuyu	Viktoriya Cherentsova	Alena & Elizaveta Shakhtariny	
Pelageya	Yaroslav Dronov	Alisa Ignatyeva	Pierre Edel	Anastasiya Glavatskikh	Ilya Kireev	Sergey Mikhaylin
Pelageya	Albert Musaelyan	Ivan Chebanov	Aygyun Askerova	~~Grigory Lavysh~~	~~Sofia Rubina Hunter~~	Zarif Norov
Pelageya	Andrey Zvonky	Nikita Vasilyev	Alexander Albert	Anzhelika Frolova		
Alexander Gradsky	Alexandra Vorobyova	Valentina Biryukova	Busha Goman	Roman Koshkarov	Andrey Lefler	Stanislas Vitort
Alexander Gradsky	Ramin Alkhansky	Ekaterina Shemyakina	Diana Sharapova	~~Samvel Vardanyan~~	Ulyana Sinetskaya	Sergey Onishchenko
Alexander Gradsky	Anna Abramochkina	Alexander Bichev	Igor Manashirov	Gulshat Khamurzina		
Dima Bilan	Alexander Bon	Ksana Sergienko	Evgeniya Blagova	Simona da Silva	Egor Sesarev	Olga Oleynikova
Dima Bilan	Evgeny Kraft	Grigory Lavysh	Sevil Velieva	~~Ramin Alkhanskiy~~	~~Aygyun Askerova~~	~~Ivan Chebanov~~
Dima Bilan	David Mgeladze	Dilyara Vagapova	Sofie Jane Lagan	Ilya Rimar		
Note: Italicized names are stolen contestants (names struck through within former teams).

== Blind auditions ==
Colour key

✔	Coach pressed "I WANT YOU" button
✔	Coach pressed "I WANT YOU" button, despite the lack of places in his/her team
	Coach pressed "I WANT YOU" button, despite the lack of places in his/her team, and artist defaulted to a coach's team
	Artist defaulted to a coach's team
	Artist picked a coach's team
	Artist eliminated with no coach pressing their button

The coaches performed "Come Together" at the start of the show.

Episode	Order	Artist	Age	Origin	Song	Coach's and artist's choices			
Episode	Order	Artist	Age	Origin	Song	Agutin	Pelageya	Gradsky	Bilan
Episode 1 (September 5, 2014)	1	Grigory Lavysh	25	Grodno, Belarus	"О любви"	✔	✔	✔	—
Episode 1 (September 5, 2014)	2	Asya Pivovarova	28	Angarsk, Irkutsk oblast	"Stayin' Alive"	—	—	—	—
Episode 1 (September 5, 2014)	3	Sergey Mikhailin	37	Khabarovsk	"Voyage, voyage"	—	✔	✔	✔
Episode 1 (September 5, 2014)	4	Sergey Onishchenko	27	Novokuznetsk, Kemerovo oblast	"Вечная любовь"	—	—	✔	✔
Episode 1 (September 5, 2014)	5	Intars Busulis	36	Talsi, Latvia	"It Don't Mean a Thing"	✔	✔	—	—
Episode 1 (September 5, 2014)	6	Alena Maltseva	33	Saint Petersburg	"Валенки"	—	—	—	—
Episode 1 (September 5, 2014)	7	Valentina Biryukova	30	Troitsk, Moscow	"Шопен"	✔	—	✔	✔
Episode 1 (September 5, 2014)	8	Yana Blinder	26	Moscow	"Let It Be"	—	—	—	—
Episode 1 (September 5, 2014)	9	Vladimir Stepanyants	48	New York City, United States	"Mañana de carnaval"	✔	—	—	—
Episode 1 (September 5, 2014)	10	Anastasia Glavatskikh	21	Ekaterinburg	"This is a Man's World"	—	✔	—	—
Episode 1 (September 5, 2014)	11	Darya Mashko	28	Surgut, Yugra	"Влюблённый солдат"	—	—	—	—
Episode 1 (September 5, 2014)	12	Ivan Urgant	36	Saint Petersburg	"Обернитесь"	—	—	—	—
Episode 1 (September 5, 2014)	13	Egor Sesarev	26	Saint Petersburg	"Angels"	—	—	—	✔
Episode 1 (September 5, 2014)	14	Gulshat Khamurzina	19	Almetyevsk, Tatarstan	"I Have Nothing"	—	—	✔	✔
Episode 2 (September 12, 2014)	1	Nikita Vasilyev	28	Vladikavkaz, North Ossetia-Alania	"Sunny"	✔	✔	—	—
Episode 2 (September 12, 2014)	2	Olga Oleynikova	37	Samara	"I Can't Stand the Rain"	✔	✔	✔	✔
Episode 2 (September 12, 2014)	3	Ulyana Sinetskaya	18	Ekaterinburg	"Белый снег"	—	—	✔	—
Episode 2 (September 12, 2014)	4	Andrey Zvonkiy	37	Moscow	"Солдат"	—	✔	—	—
Episode 2 (September 12, 2014)	5	Irina Burenkova	29	Samara	"Woman in Love"	—	—	—	—
Episode 2 (September 12, 2014)	6	Nail Gimadeev	27	Moscow	"Ave Maria (Schubert)"	—	—	—	—
Episode 2 (September 12, 2014)	7	Ntantie Mari Nzhypuakuyu	30	Foumban, Cameroon	"Я милого узнаю по походке"	✔	—	—	—
Episode 2 (September 12, 2014)	8	Evgeniya Blagova	27	Novouralsk, Sverdlovsk oblast	"Je suis Malade"	—	✔	✔	✔
Episode 2 (September 12, 2014)	9	Atesh Abbasov	22	Moscow	"Шанхай-блюз"	—	—	—	—
Episode 2 (September 12, 2014)	10	Mikhail Movshovich	67	Moscow	"Скажите, девушки"	—	—	—	—
Episode 2 (September 12, 2014)	11	Ivan Chebanov	26	Barnaul	"Don't Worry, Be Happy"	✔	—	—	✔
Episode 2 (September 12, 2014)	12	Alisa Ignatyeva	24	Moscow	"Ой, у вишневому саду"	—	✔	—	—
Episode 2 (September 12, 2014)	13	Irina Gorbunova	26	Ekaterinburg	"Black Velvet"	—	—	—	—
Episode 2 (September 12, 2014)	14	Georgiy Yufa	39	Moscow	"Nothing's Gonna Change My Love for You"	✔	✔	✔	✔
Episode 3 (September 19, 2014)	1	Pierre Edel	28	Paris, France	"House of the Rising Sun"	✔	✔	—	—
Episode 3 (September 19, 2014)	2	Kristina Yarskaya	21	Yar, Udmurtia	"Птица"	—	—	—	—
Episode 3 (September 19, 2014)	3	Mariam Merabova	42	Moscow	"Georgia on My Mind"	✔	✔	✔	✔
Episode 3 (September 19, 2014)	4	Kurban Nabiulin	55	Krasnoyarsk	"Песня старого извозчика"	—	—	—	—
Episode 3 (September 19, 2014)	5	Sevil Velieva	21	Simferopol	"Listen"	✔	—	—	✔
Episode 3 (September 19, 2014)	6	Ilya Kireev	27	Moscow	"Танцы на стёклах"	—	✔	—	—
Episode 3 (September 19, 2014)	7	Alexander Bichev	22	Kamenka, Voronezh Oblast	"Per te"	✔	✔	✔	—
Episode 3 (September 19, 2014)	8	Alexandra Akmanova	22	Murmansk	"Get Lucky" / "Топится баня"	—	—	—	—
Episode 3 (September 19, 2014)	9	Yaroslav Dronov	22	Novomoskovsk, Tula oblast	"Знаешь"	—	✔	—	✔
Episode 3 (September 19, 2014)	10	Sofia Shams	18	Saint Petersburg	"Не надо слов"	—	—	—	—
Episode 3 (September 19, 2014)	11	Albert Musaelyan	23	Saratov	"What a Wonderful World"	—	✔	—	—
Episode 3 (September 19, 2014)	12	Evgeny Kraft	27	Novosibirsk	"Happy"	—	—	—	✔
Episode 3 (September 19, 2014)	13	Simona da Silva	22	Lipetsk	"If I Ain't Got You"	—	—	—	✔
Episode 3 (September 19, 2014)	14	Alexander Albert	29	Kazan	"Верни мне музыку"	✔	✔	✔	✔
Episode 4 (September 26, 2014)	1	Lyudmila Sokolova	42	Volgograd	"Падаю в небо"	✔	✔	✔	✔
Episode 4 (September 26, 2014)	2	Eldar Akhmedov	16	Tula	"Funiculì, Funiculà"	—	—	—	—
Episode 4 (September 26, 2014)	3	Alena & Elizaveta Shakhtariny	26/23	Tomsk	"Mr. Sandman"	✔	—	—	—
Episode 4 (September 26, 2014)	4	Sophie Jane Lagan	29	London, United Kingdom	"Like a Star"	—	—	—	✔
Episode 4 (September 26, 2014)	5	Zarif Norov	26	Akhtubinsk, Astrakhan Oblast	"Дай мне шанс"	—	✔	—	—
Episode 4 (September 26, 2014)	6	Igor Manashirov	49	Moscow	"Summertime"	—	✔	✔	✔
Episode 4 (September 26, 2014)	7	Marta Zhdanyuk	21	Minsk, Belarus	"Купалинка"	—	—	—	—
Episode 4 (September 26, 2014)	8	David Mgeladze	28	Tbilisi, Georgia	"Nothing's Gonna Change My Love for You"	—	—	—	✔
Episode 4 (September 26, 2014)	9	Roman Kashkarov	35	Barnaul	"Superstition"	—	—	✔	✔
Episode 4 (September 26, 2014)	10	Ruslan Silin	40	Vorkuta, Komi	"Государыня"	—	—	—	—
Episode 4 (September 26, 2014)	11	Natalya Vinokurova	25	Moscow	"Stop"	—	—	—	—
Episode 4 (September 26, 2014)	12	Anna Abramochkina	42	Tomsk	"Зеркало"	—	✔	✔	—
Episode 4 (September 26, 2014)	13	Stanislas Vitort	39	Toronto, Canada	"Dicitencello vuje"	—	—	✔	—
Episode 4 (September 26, 2014)	14	Maria Zaytseva	21	Moscow	"Why"	✔	—	✔	✔
Episode 5 (October 3, 2014)	1	Ekaterina Shemyakina	35	Moscow	"Get Lucky"	—	✔	✔	—
Episode 5 (October 3, 2014)	2	Artur Best	33	Kapan, Armenia	"Ноктюрн"	✔	—	✔	✔
Episode 5 (October 3, 2014)	3	Aglaya Shilovskaya	21	Moscow	"House of the Rising Sun"	—	—	—	—
Episode 5 (October 3, 2014)	4	Michael Blaise	34	Kursk	"This is a Man's World"	✔	—	—	—
Episode 5 (October 3, 2014)	5	Sofia Rubina Hunter	29	Tallinn, Estonia	"Autumn Leaves"	—	✔	—	✔
Episode 5 (October 3, 2014)	6	Daniil Gradsky	33	Moscow	"Tears in Heaven"	—	✔	—	✔
Episode 5 (October 3, 2014)	7	Natalya Bayara	21	Minsk, Belarus	"Ты снишься мне"	—	—	—	—
Episode 5 (October 3, 2014)	8	Alexander Prostakov	25	Kazan	"WWW"	—	—	—	—
Episode 5 (October 3, 2014)	9	Ksana Sergienko	30	New York City, United States	"Why"	✔	✔	✔	✔
Episode 5 (October 3, 2014)	10	Nikita Osin	23	Tashkent, Uzbekistan	"Гори, гори, моя звезда"	—	—	—	—
Episode 5 (October 3, 2014)	11	Diana Sharapova	30	Almaty, Kazakhstan	"Stop"	✔	—	—	—
Episode 5 (October 3, 2014)	12	Andrey Grizli	27	Moscow	"Знаешь"	✔	—	—	✔
Episode 5 (October 3, 2014)	13	Ksenia Buzina	24	Chita	"If I Ain't Got You"	✔	—	✔	✔
Episode 5 (October 3, 2014)	14	Busha Goman	37	Lyubertsy, Moscow Oblast	"Nothing's Gonna Change My Love for You"	Team full	—	✔	✔
Episode 6 (October 10, 2014)	1	Alexandra Vorobyova	23	Engels, Saratov Oblast	"Chandelier"	Team full	✔	✔	✔
Episode 6 (October 10, 2014)	2	Yury Kononov	36	Moscow	"Напрасные слова"	Team full	—	—	—
Episode 6 (October 10, 2014)	3	Alexander Bon	29	Murmansk	"Je suis Malade"	Team full	✔	—	✔
Episode 6 (October 10, 2014)	4	Viktoria Cherentsova	26	Korkino, Chelyabinsk Oblast	"Шопен"	✔	✔	✔	✔
Episode 6 (October 10, 2014)	5	Vitaliy Voronko	23	Minsk, Belarus	"Blurred Lines"	Team full	—	—	—
Episode 6 (October 10, 2014)	6	Dilyara Vagapova	29	Kazan	"Солдат"	Team full	—	—	✔
Episode 6 (October 10, 2014)	7	Nicole Chavez	19	Quito, Ecuador	"Contigo en la Distancia"	Team full	—	—	—
Episode 6 (October 10, 2014)	8	Aigyun Askerova	37	Baku, Azerbaijan	"Миражи"	Team full	—	—	✔
Episode 6 (October 10, 2014)	9	Ilya Rimar	26	Saint Petersburg	"Скажите, девушки"	Team full	—	—	✔
Episode 6 (October 10, 2014)	10	Vladimir Ivanov	29	Kazan	"Happy"	Team full	—	—	—
Episode 6 (October 10, 2014)	11	Andrey Lefler	27	Nalchik, Kabardino-Balkar Republic	"Снилось мне"	Team full	—	✔	—
Episode 6 (October 10, 2014)	12	Anzhelika Frolova	27	Surgut, Yugra	"I Believe I Can Fly	Team full	✔	✔	—
Episode 6 (October 10, 2014)	13	Ramin Alkhanskiy	26	Sochi, Krasnodar Krai	"Ноктюрн"	Team full	Team full	—	✔
Episode 6 (October 10, 2014)	14	Samvel Vardanyan	21	Moscow	"Song for You"	✔	✔	✔	✔

== The Battles ==
The Battles round started with episode 7 and ended with episode 10. The coaches can steal two losing artists from another coach. Contestants who win their battle or are stolen by another coach will advance to the Knockout rounds.

Colour key

Artist won the Battle and advanced to the Knockouts
Artist lost the Battle but was stolen by another coach and advanced to the Knockouts
Artist lost the Battle and was eliminated

Episode	Coach	Order	Winner	Song	Loser	'Steal' result			
Episode	Coach	Order	Winner	Song	Loser	Agutin	Pelageya	Gradsky	Bilan
Episode 7 (October 17, 2014)	Leonid Agutin	1	Andrey Grizli	"Bad Girls"	Ntentie Mari Nzhipuakuyu	—N/a	—	—	—
Episode 7 (October 17, 2014)	Dima Bilan	2	Ksana Sergienko	"Я тебя отвоюю"	Aigyun Askerova	—	✔	—	—N/a
Episode 7 (October 17, 2014)	Pelageya	3	Albert Musaelyan	"Freedom"	Nikita Vasilyev	—	—N/a	—	—
Episode 7 (October 17, 2014)	Leonid Agutin	4	Lyudmila Sokolova	"Если ты слышишь"	Sevil Velieva	—N/a	—	—	✔
Episode 7 (October 17, 2014)	Alexander Gradsky	5	Andrey Lefler	"Miserere"	Sergey Onishchenko	—	—	—N/a	—
Episode 7 (October 17, 2014)	Pelageya	6	Anastasia Glavatskikh	"Белая песня"	Anzhelika Frolova	—	—N/a	—	—
Episode 7 (October 17, 2014)	Alexander Gradsky	7	Ekaterina Shemyakina	"Unforgetable"	Igor Manashirov	—	—	—N/a	—
Episode 8 (October 24, 2014)	Leonid Agutin	1	Georgy Yufa	"Beauty and the Beast"	Diana Sharapova	—N/a	✔	✔	—
Episode 8 (October 24, 2014)	Dima Bilan	2	Olga Oleynikova	"Ищу тебя"	Ilya Rimar	—	—	—	—N/a
Episode 8 (October 24, 2014)	Leonid Agutin	3	Intars Busulis	"Play That Funky Music"	Michael Blaze	—N/a	—	—	—
Episode 8 (October 24, 2014)	Alexander Gradsky	4	Alexandra Vorobyova	"Две розы"	Gulshat Khamurzina	—	—	—N/a	—
Episode 8 (October 24, 2014)	Dima Bilan	5	Evgeniy Kraft	"Every Breath You Take"	Sophie Jain Lagan	—	—	—	—N/a
Episode 8 (October 24, 2014)	Pelageya	6	Sergey Mikhaylin	"На заре"	Grigory Lavysh	—	—N/a	—	✔
Episode 8 (October 24, 2014)	Pelageya	7	Alisa Ignatyeva	"The Shadow of Your Smile"	Alexander Albert	—	—N/a	—	Team full
Episode 9 (October 31, 2014)	Leonid Agutin	1	Mariam Merabova	"Бумажный змей"	Viktoriya Cherentsova	—N/a	—	—	Team full
Episode 9 (October 31, 2014)	Leonid Agutin	1	Mariam Merabova	"Бумажный змей"	Ksenia Buzina	—N/a	—	—	Team full
Episode 9 (October 31, 2014)	Dima Bilan	2	Egor Sesarev	"Billie Jean"	Ivan Chebanov	—	✔	—	Team full
Episode 9 (October 31, 2014)	Alexander Gradsky	3	Stanislas Vitort	"I Hate You Then I Love You"	Anna Abramochkina	—	Team full	—N/a	Team full
Episode 9 (October 31, 2014)	Pelageya	4	Ilya Kireev	"Для тебя"	Andrey Zvonkiy	—	Team full	—	Team full
Episode 9 (October 31, 2014)	Dima Bilan	5	Simona da Silva	"Say Something"	Ramin Alkhansky	—	Team full	✔	Team full
Episode 9 (October 31, 2014)	Alexander Gradsky	6	Valentina Biryukova	"Твои следы"	Alexander Bichev	—	Team full	Team full	Team full
Episode 9 (October 31, 2014)	Leonid Agutin	7	Artur Best	"Ese Momento"	Vladimir Stepanyants	—N/a	Team full	Team full	Team full
Episode 10 (November 7, 2014)	Pelageya	1	Pierre Edel	"Total Eclipse of the Heart"	Sophia Rubina Hunter	✔	Team full	Team full	Team full
Episode 10 (November 7, 2014)	Leonid Agutin	2	Maria Zaytseva	"Три счастливых дня"	Shakhtariny Sisters	—N/a	Team full	Team full	Team full
Episode 10 (November 7, 2014)	Pelageya	3	Yaroslav Dronov	"7 Nation Army"	Zarif Norov	—	Team full	Team full	Team full
Episode 10 (November 7, 2014)	Alexander Gradsky	4	Busha Goman	"How Do You Keep the Music Playing"	Ulyana Sinetskaya	—	Team full	Team full	Team full
Episode 10 (November 7, 2014)	Dima Bilan	5	Alexander Bon	"Я ждал всю жизнь"	David Mgeladze	—	Team full	Team full	Team full
Episode 10 (November 7, 2014)	Alexander Gradsky	6	Roman Kashkarov	"Living for the City"	Samvel Vardanyan	✔	Team full	Team full	Team full
Episode 10 (November 7, 2014)	Dima Bilan	7	Evgeniya Blagova	"Как тревожен этот путь"	Dilyara Vagapova	Team full	Team full	Team full	Team full

== The Knockouts ==
The Knockouts round started with episode 11 and ended with episode 13.

After the Battle Round, each coach had 9 contestants for the Knockouts. The contestants were not told who they were up against until the day of the Knockout. Each contestant sang a song of their own choice, back to back, and each knockout concluded with the respective coach eliminating one of the three contestants.

The top 24 contestants will then move on to the Quarterfinal.

Colour key

Artist won the Knockout and advanced to the Quarterfinal
Artist lost the Knockout and was eliminated

Episode	Coach	Order	Song	Winners	Loser	Song
Episode 11 (November 14, 2014)	Leonid Agutin	1	"Они знакомы давно"	Artur Best	Sophia Rubina Hunter	"Can't Buy Me Love"
Episode 11 (November 14, 2014)	Leonid Agutin	1	"Tu Mi Manchi Amore Mio"	Lyudmila Sokolova	Sophia Rubina Hunter	"Can't Buy Me Love"
Episode 11 (November 14, 2014)	Alexander Gradsky	2	"Вальс о вальсе"	Alexandra Vorobyova	Ekaterina Shemyakina	"Hurt"
Episode 11 (November 14, 2014)	Alexander Gradsky	2	"Баллада о матери"	Valentina Biryukova	Ekaterina Shemyakina	"Hurt"
Episode 11 (November 14, 2014)	Pelageya	3	"Le Temps des Cathedrales"	Pierre Edel	Albert Musaelyan	"Без тебя"
Episode 11 (November 14, 2014)	Pelageya	3	"Something's Got a Hold on Me"	Anastasia Glavatskikh	Albert Musaelyan	"Без тебя"
Episode 11 (November 14, 2014)	Dima Bilan	4	"I Can't Dance"	Egor Sesarev	Grigory Lavysh	"Этажи"
Episode 11 (November 14, 2014)	Dima Bilan	4	"Часы"	Alexander Bon	Grigory Lavysh	"Этажи"
Episode 12 (November 21, 2014)	Dima Bilan	1	"Hold On, I'm Comin'"	Olga Oleynikova	Sevil Velieva	"Я искала тебя"
Episode 12 (November 21, 2014)	Dima Bilan	1	"Broken Vow"	Ksana Sergienko	Sevil Velieva	"Я искала тебя"
Episode 12 (November 21, 2014)	Pelageya	2	"Летела гагара"	Alisa Ignatyeva	Ivan Chebanov	"Девчонка-девчоночка"
Episode 12 (November 21, 2014)	Pelageya	2	"Боже, какой пустяк"	Yaroslav Dronov	Ivan Chebanov	"Девчонка-девчоночка"
Episode 12 (November 21, 2014)	Leonid Agutin	3	"Полетели"	Andrey Grizli	Samvel Vardanyan	"Historia De Un Amor"
Episode 12 (November 21, 2014)	Leonid Agutin	3	"Путь к свету"	Georgiy Yufa	Samvel Vardanyan	"Historia De Un Amor"
Episode 12 (November 21, 2014)	Alexander Gradsky	4	"They Won't Go When I Go"	Roman Kashkarov	Diana Sharapova	"Out Here on My Own"
Episode 12 (November 21, 2014)	Alexander Gradsky	4	"Ederlezi"	Busha Goman	Diana Sharapova	"Out Here on My Own"
Episode 13 (November 28, 2014)	Pelageya	1	"Белые крылья"	Sergey Mikhaylin	Aigyun Askerova	"All Around the World / "Невеста в жёлтом"
Episode 13 (November 28, 2014)	Pelageya	1	"Cry Me a River"	Ilya Kireev	Aigyun Askerova	"All Around the World / "Невеста в жёлтом"
Episode 13 (November 28, 2014)	Leonid Agutin	2	"Я тебя рисую"	Intars Busulis	Maria Zaytseva	"I Belong to You"
Episode 13 (November 28, 2014)	Leonid Agutin	2	"Реквием"	Mariam Merabova	Maria Zaytseva	"I Belong to You"
Episode 13 (November 28, 2014)	Dima Bilan	3	"Goomba Boomba"	Evgeniya Blagova	Evgeniy Kraft	"Love of My Life"
Episode 13 (November 28, 2014)	Dima Bilan	3	"Небеса"	Simona da Silva	Evgeniy Kraft	"Love of My Life"
Episode 13 (November 28, 2014)	Alexander Gradsky	4	"Песня о корабле"	Andrey Lefler	Ramin Alkhanskiy	"Y Si Fuera Ella"
Episode 13 (November 28, 2014)	Alexander Gradsky	4	"Жил-был я"	Stanislas Vitort	Ramin Alkhanskiy	"Y Si Fuera Ella"

== Live shows ==
Colour key:

Artist was saved by Votes' summa
Artist was eliminated

=== Week 1, 2: Quarterfinals ===
The Quarterfinals started with episode 14 and ended with episode 15. The two artists from the team with the fewest votes left the competition by the end of the nights.

Episode	Coach	Order	Artist	Song	Coach's vote (/100%)	Public's vote (/100%)	Votes' sum	Result
Episode 14 (December 5, 2014)	Leonid Agutin	1	Georgiy Yufa	"September"	30%	23.5%	53.5%	Eliminated
Episode 14 (December 5, 2014)	Leonid Agutin	2	Lyudmila Sokolova	"Ты здесь"	20%	38.2%	58.2%	Eliminated
Episode 14 (December 5, 2014)	Leonid Agutin	3	Mariam Merabova	"Play The Game"	50%	38.3%	88.3%	Advanced
Episode 14 (December 5, 2014)	Alexander Gradsky	4	Roman Kashkarov	"С чего бы"	30%	11.4%	41.4%	Eliminated
Episode 14 (December 5, 2014)	Alexander Gradsky	5	Alexandra Vorobyova	"You Lost Me"	50%	67.4%	117.4%	Advanced
Episode 14 (December 5, 2014)	Alexander Gradsky	6	Andrey Lefler	"Вот так папа пел"	20%	21.2%	41.2%	Eliminated
Episode 14 (December 5, 2014)	Dima Bilan	7	Evgeniya Blagova	"Ария звезды"	20%	38.5%	58.5%	Eliminated
Episode 14 (December 5, 2014)	Dima Bilan	8	Egor Sesarev	"Игрушки"	30%	18.8%	48.8%	Eliminated
Episode 14 (December 5, 2014)	Dima Bilan	9	Ksana Sergienko	"Beat It"	50%	42.7%	92.7%	Advanced
Episode 14 (December 5, 2014)	Pelageya	10	Yaroslav Dronov	"Когда молод был"	50%	70.9%	120.9%	Advanced
Episode 14 (December 5, 2014)	Pelageya	11	Ilya Kireev	"Smile Mona Lisa"	20%	15.6%	35.6%	Eliminated
Episode 14 (December 5, 2014)	Pelageya	12	Anastasia Glavatskikh	"Secretly"	30%	15.5%	43.5%	Eliminated
Episode 15 (December 12, 2014)	Alexander Gradsky	1	Stanislas Vitort	"The Music of the Night"	20%	10.5%	30.5%	Eliminated
Episode 15 (December 12, 2014)	Alexander Gradsky	2	Valentina Biryukova	"Арлекино"	50%	65.7%	117.5%	Advanced
Episode 15 (December 12, 2014)	Alexander Gradsky	3	Busha Goman	"Fallin' in Love with Jesus"	30%	22%	52%	Eliminated
Episode 15 (December 12, 2014)	Leonid Agutin	4	Intars Busulis	"Я люблю тебя больше природы"	50%	39.6%	89.6%	Advanced
Episode 15 (December 12, 2014)	Leonid Agutin	5	Andrey Grizli	"Counting Stars"	20%	24%	44%	Eliminated
Episode 15 (December 12, 2014)	Leonid Agutin	6	Artur Best	"Поздний вечер в Сорренто"	30%	36.4%	66.4%	Eliminated
Episode 15 (December 12, 2014)	Pelageya	7	Sergey Mikhaylin	"Jesus to a Child"	20%	12.8%	32.8%	Eliminated
Episode 15 (December 12, 2014)	Pelageya	8	Alisa Ignatyeva	"Белым снегом"	50%	58.4%	108.4%	Advanced
Episode 15 (December 12, 2014)	Pelageya	9	Pierre Edel	"Я лишь хочу сказать"	30%	28.8%	58.8%	Eliminated
Episode 15 (December 12, 2014)	Dima Bilan	10	Olga Oleynikova	"До самого неба"	20%	8.4%	28.4%	Eliminated
Episode 15 (December 12, 2014)	Dima Bilan	11	Simona da Silva	"Wrecking Ball"	30%	23.2%	53.2%	Eliminated
Episode 15 (December 12, 2014)	Dima Bilan	12	Alexander Bon	"Supremacy"	50%	68.4%	118.4%	Advanced

=== Week 3: Semifinal ===
The one artist with the fewest votes from the each team left the competition.

Episode	Coach	Order	Artist	Song	Coach's vote (/100%)	Public's vote (/100%)	Votes' sum	Result
Episode 16 (December 19, 2014)	Leonid Agutin	1	Intars Busulis	"Honesty"	40%	45.6%	85.6%	Eliminated
Episode 16 (December 19, 2014)	Leonid Agutin	2	Mariam Merabova	"Сто часов счастья"	60%	54.4%	114.4%	Advanced
Episode 16 (December 19, 2014)	Dima Bilan	3	Alexander Bon	"Давай друг друга украдём"	60%	81.9%	141.9%	Advanced
Episode 16 (December 19, 2014)	Dima Bilan	4	Ksana Sergienko	"Приезжай"	40%	18.1%	58.1%	Eliminated
Episode 16 (December 19, 2014)	Pelageya	5	Yaroslav Dronov	"Я здесь"	60%	65.6%	125.6%	Advanced
Episode 16 (December 19, 2014)	Pelageya	6	Alisa Ignatyeva	"Брови"	40%	34.4%	74.4%	Eliminated
Episode 16 (December 19, 2014)	Alexander Gradsky	7	Valentina Biryukova	"The Best"	40%	43.4%	83.4%	Eliminated
Episode 16 (December 19, 2014)	Alexander Gradsky	8	Alexandra Vorobyova	"Listen"	60%	56.6%	116.6%	Advanced

Non-competition performances
Order	Performer	Song
16.1	Alexander Marshal, Alexey Belov, Intars Busulis, and Mariam Merabova	"Moscow Calling"
16.2	Valeriya, Alexander Bon, and Ksana Sergienko	"Pardonne-moi ce caprice d'enfant"
16.3	Garik Sukachov, Yaroslav Dronov, and Alisa Ignatyeva	"Ольга"
16.4	Mikhail Boyarskiy, Alexandra Vorobyova, and Valentina Biryukova	"Nowhere Man"

=== Week 4: Final ===
The Top 4 performed on December 26, 2014. This week, the four finalists performed two solo cover songs and a duet with their coach.

Episode	Coach	Artist	Order	Duet Song (with Coach)	Order	Solo Song (no.1)	Order	Solo Song (no.2)	Result	
Episode 17 (December 26, 2014)
Episode 17 (December 26, 2014)	Leonid Agutin	Mariam Merabova	1	"Что происходит?"	5	"I Just Wanna Make Love to You"	Eliminated		Fourth place	
Episode 17 (December 26, 2014)	Pelageya	Yaroslav Dronov	2	"Не для меня"	6	"Настоящему индейцу"	9	"What Love Can Be"	Second place	45%
Episode 17 (December 26, 2014)	Alexander Gradsky	Alexandra Vorobyova	3	"Любимая, спи"	7	"Лебединая верность"	10	"Призрак оперы"	Winner	55%
Episode 17 (December 26, 2014)	Dima Bilan	Alexander Bon	4	"Не молчи"	8	"I Was Made for Lovin' You"	11	"Созрела"	Third place	

Non-competition performances
Order	Performers	Song
17.1	Mariam Merabova, Yaroslav Dronov, Alexandra Vorobyova, and Alexander Bon	"The Winner Takes It All"
17.2	Mariam Merabova	"Исповедь артиста"
17.3	Alexandra Vorobyova (winner)	"Лебединая верность"
17.4	All artists of the 3rd season	"The Winner Takes It All"

== Reception ==
=== Rating ===
Episode		Original airdate	Production	Time slot (UTC+3)	Audience		Source
Episode		Original airdate	Production	Time slot (UTC+3)	Rating	Share	Source
1	"The Blind Auditions Premiere"	September 5, 2014	301	Friday 9:45 p.m.	7.9	27.8%	
2	"The Blind Auditions, Part 2"	September 12, 2014	302	Friday 9:45 p.m.	8.0	29.5%	
3	"The Blind Auditions, Part 3"	September 19, 2014	303	Friday 9:45 p.m.	8.8	29.1%	
4	"The Blind Auditions, Part 4"	September 26, 2014	304	Friday 9:45 p.m.	8.6	26.9%	
5	"The Blind Auditions, Part 5"	October 3, 2014	305	Friday 9:45 p.m.	8.6	27.7%	
6	"The Blind Auditions, Part 6"	October 10, 2014	306	Friday 9:45 p.m.	9.4	30.3%	
7	"The Battles Premiere"	October 17, 2014	307	Friday 9:45 p.m.	8.7	27.2%	
8	"The Battles, Part 2"	October 24, 2014	308	Friday 9:45 p.m.	7.8	25.3%	
9	"The Battles, Part 3"	October 31, 2014	309	Friday 9:45 p.m.	6.5	20.4%	
10	"The Battles, Part 4"	November 7, 2014	310	Friday 9:45 p.m.	7.8	23.8%	
11	"The Knockouts Premiere"	November 14, 2014	311	Friday 9:45 p.m.	8.4	26.2%	
12	"The Knockouts, Part 2"	November 21, 2014	312	Friday 9:45 p.m.	7.4	22.9%	
13	"The Knockouts, Part 3"	November 28, 2014	313	Friday 9:45 p.m.	7.6	24.3%	
14	"Live Quarterfinal 1"	December 5, 2014	314	Friday 9:35 p.m.	6.3	20.2%	
15	"Live Quarterfinal 2"	December 12, 2014	315	Friday 9:35 p.m.	6.7	21.8%	
16	"Live Semifinal"	December 19, 2014	316	Friday 9:35 p.m.	7.6	24.2%	
17	"Live Season Final"	December 26, 2014	317	Friday 9:35 p.m.	8.2	26.8%	
