= La fiesta de la paz =

2025 single by Omar Acedo

Single by Omar Acedo
- Language: Spanish
- English title: The Festival of Peace
- Released: 1 August 2025
- Length: 4:01
- Label: White Box Distribution; Headliner Music
- Composer: Omar Rafael Acedo Sánchez
- Lyricist: Omar Rafael Acedo Sánchez
- Producer: Omar Rafael Acedo Sánchez

Omar Acedo singles chronology
"Psiquiatra" (2025)	"La fiesta de la paz" (2025)	"Nada cambiará Mi amor" (2025)

Music video
- "La fiesta de la paz" on YouTube

Alternative cover
- Cover art for the song's release on Russian streaming services

"La fiesta de la paz" (transl. The Festival of Peace) is a song by Venezuelan singer Omar Acedo. The single was released on 1 August 2025 and represented Venezuela in the Intervision 2025. The song peaked at number one at Venezuelan airplay chart.

== Background ==
Speaking in an interview about the song's message, the artist said: "This is a song that speaks to that beautiful feeling of sharing and having a good time, prioritizing peace as a means of overcoming difficulties."

== Intervision 2025 ==
=== Internal selection ===
On 1 August 2025, Omar Acedo was officially announced as the representative of Venezuela at Intervision 2025.

A few weeks before the contest, Venezuelan Minister of Culture Ernesto Villegas revealed in an interview, that as soon as the country received an invitation from the organizers to participate in the contest, "given the nature of the show, we automatically chose Omar Acedo [as our representative], who perfectly fit the style with his music blending contemporary rhythms with Venezuelan musical roots and an aesthetic consistent with the show".

=== At Intervision ===
The Intervision 2025 took place at Live Arena in Novoivanovskoye, (Note: Labelled as Moscow in promotional material) Russia, and consisted of final held on 20 September 2025. At the performance order draw on 12 August, Venezuela was chosen to perform in position 17, after Netsanet Sultan of Ethiopia and before Slobodan Trkulja and Balkanopolis of Serbia. In the end, Omar Acedo placed 13th with 268 points.

== Commercial performance ==
In Venezuela, the song debuted at number five on Record Report's Venezuelan airplay chart dated 18 August 2025. Two weeks later, at the chart dated 13 September 2025 it peaked at number one.

== Charts ==
Chart performance for "La fiesta de la paz"
Chart (2025)	Peak position
Venezuela Airplay (Record Report)	1
