= Phù Đổng Thiên Vương (song) =

Single by Đức Phúc
- Language: Vietnamese
- Released: 29 August 2025
- Length: 3:00
- Label: Sony Music Entertainment Hong Kong
- Composer: Hồ Hoài Anh
- Lyricists: Hồ Hoài Anh; Nguyễn Duy; Phúc Du; Orange

Music video
- "Phù Đổng Thiên Vương" on YouTube

"Phù Đổng Thiên Vương" is a song by Vietnamese singer Đức Phúc. Released on 29 August 2025, it represented Vietnam at Intervision 2025 and won the contest with a total score of 422 points.

== Background and composition ==
"Phù Đổng Thiên Vương" is based on the legend of Thánh Gióng, a character in Vietnamese folk beliefs who embodies the spirit and strength of the Vietnamese people. The song is composed by Hồ Hoài Anh, with arrangement by DuongK. Phúc Du wrote the rap lyrics, while the English lyrics were written by Orange. The opening verse of the song is taken from the first four lines of the poem "Vietnamese Bamboo" by Nguyen Duy.

== Intervision 2025 ==
=== Internal selection ===
On 13 July 2025, Đức Phúc was announced as the official representative of Vietnam to participate in the 2025 Intervision Song Contest held in Russia. The selection was entrusted by the Ministry of Culture, Sports and Tourism to Nomad MGMT Vietnam, a company under the DatVietVAC group, and Phúc was chosen thanks to "his outstanding voice and modern musical thinking that was close to international standards".

=== During Intervision 2025 ===
The Intervision 2025 took place at Live Arena in Novoivanovskoye, (Note: Labelled as Moscow in promotional material) Russia, and consisted of final held on 20 September 2025. At the performance order draw on 12 August, Vietnam was chosen to perform in position 20, after Mzansi Jikelele of South Africa and before Nastya Kravchenko of Belarus. In the end, Đức Phúc received a total of 422 points, winning the competition.

== Charts ==
Chart performance
| Chart (2025) | Peak position |
|---|---|
| Vietnam Top Vietnamese Songs (Billboard Vietnam) | 70 |
