= Russia in the Intervision Song Contest =

- Participating broadcaster: Channel One Russia (C1R; 2008, 2025–present)

Participation summary
- Appearances: 2
- First appearance: 2008
- Highest placement: 2nd: 2008
- Host: 2008, 2025

Russia was represented at the Intervision Song Contest twice: in 2008 and in 2025; and hosted both editions of the contest.

== History ==
Russia first participated in 2008 with Kvatro as the representing artist, and ended up in second place, their highest to date.

Russia participated again in the 2025 revival, being representated by Shaman. Shaman later confirmed that the country may participate in 2026.

== Participation overview ==
Table key
2	Second place
†	Upcoming event

Year	Artist	Song(s)	Language	Place	Points
2008	Kvatro	"Romans" (Романс)	Russian	2	215
2008	Kvatro	"Skazhite, devushki, podruzhke vashey" (Скажите, девушки, подружке вашей)	Russian	2	215
2008	Kvatro	"Sola otra vez"	Spanish	2	215
2025	Shaman	"Pryamo po serdtsu" (Прямо по сердцу)	Russian	Not ranked (Note: Officially it is unknown why Russia was not included in the final results. After his performance, the representative of Russia, Shaman, addressed the audience and asked the jury to skip him in the voting, as "he was not interested in competing for victory, but rather in ensuring hospitality and giving other participants a chance".)	
2026	Upcoming †				

== Related involvement ==
=== Commentators and jurors ===
Year	Channel	Commentator(s)	Juror	Ref.
2025	C1R	Yana Churikova and Yuriy Aksyuta	Igor Matvienko	
