= Pryamo po serdtsu =

2025 single by Shaman

Single by Shaman
- Language: Russian
- English title: Straight to the Heart
- Released: 7 June 2025
- Recorded: May 2025
- Genre: Pop; Russian pop
- Length: 2:57
- Label: Headliner Music
- Composer: Maxim Fadeev
- Lyricist: Maxim Aleksandrovich Fadeev

Shaman singles chronology
"Drug" (2025)	"Pryamo po serdtsu" (2025)	"Gulyay, Rossiya!" (2025)

Music video
- "Pryamo po serdtsu" on YouTube

"Pryamo po serdtsu" (Russian: Прямо по сердцу, transl. Straight to the Heart) is a song by Russian singer Shaman. It was written and composed by Maxim Fadeev. The song was released on 7 June 2025 and represented Russia at Intervision 2025. The song peaked at number 74 at Russian airplay chart.

== Background and composition ==
On 19 May 2025, Shaman confirmed in an interview that the song will be written only in Russian.

On 6 June 2025, the organisers of Intervision confirmed that the song will be titled "Pryamo po serdtsu" and was written and composed by Maxim Fadeev.

The composer confirmed, that the song was created in three different versions before the final one got selected. He accepted the offer to create the song in March 2025 and did not know who will be the representative while working on it.

== Music video and promotion ==
On 2 June 2025, the Russian music TV channel Muz-TV exclusively announced that the song would be performed live for the first time at the Premya Muz-TV 2025 music awards. The event took place on 7 June 2025.

On 3 July 2025, the singer confirmed that the music video is being filmed and will be released soon.

On 18 July 2025, Muz-TV announced that the official music video for the song will premiere exclusively on their TV channel at 12:30 Moscow Time. An additional promo premiere will take place at 20:30 Moscow time on the same day at "one of the largest media facades in the country", located in the Kinoteatr Oktyabr building on New Arbat Avenue in Moscow.

The music video was directed by Elvin Fomin, which emphasised that "the concept of the video conveys a profound meaning, which Dronov masterfully embodied. Dark and cold shades emphasise the drama of the lyrical hero's story". Fomin noted that the "coordinated work with the artist, with whom he already has experience of collaborating, ensured the success of the filming process".

Shaman additionally sang the song live during the press conference held to celebrate 100 days before the final of Intervision 2025.

The song was also performed live on 27 June 2025 during televised event Moskosvskiy Vypusknoy 2025 hosted by Muz-TV.

== Intervision 2025 ==
=== Internal selection ===
On 19 May 2025, Intervision organizers officially confirmed that Shaman will represent Russia at Intervision 2025. The same day his participation was officially confirmed at Channel One's talk show Let Them Talk. Responding to the announcement, Shaman said he was "very happy and grateful" for having been chosen to represent Russia.

=== At Intervision ===
The Intervision 2025 took place at Live Arena in Novoivanovskoye, (Note: Labelled as Moscow in promotional material) Russia, and consisted of final held on 20 September 2025.

== Commercial performance ==
In Russia, the song debuted at number 127 on TopHit's Russian airplay chart dated 26 June 2025. It eventually peaked on the chart at number 74 on week dated 14 August 2025. In Commonwealth of Independent States, the song debuted at number 193 on TopHit's Commonwealth of Independent States Airplay chart dated 3 July 2025. It eventually peaked at number 156, on chart dated 7 August 2025.

== Charts ==
Chart performance for "Pryamo po serdtsu"
Chart (2025)	Peak position
CIS Airplay (TopHit)	156
Russia Airplay (TopHit)	74
