= Intervision 2025 =

International song competition

Intervision 2025 Интервидение 2025
- Музыка в сердце твоей страны "Music in the heart of your country"

Date and venue
- Final: 20 September 2025
- Venue: Live Arena; Novoivanovskoye, (Note: Labelled as Moscow in promotional material.) Russia

Organisation
- Organiser: Ministry of Foreign Affairs of the Russian Federation; Foundation for the Preservation and Support of Cultural Heritage and the Development of National and World Culture "Traditions of Art"; Channel One; National Media Group

Production
- Director: Roman Butovsky
- Executive producer: Konstantin Ernst
- Presenters: Domestic: Alexey Vorobyov; Aida Garifullina; International: Meng Lei (China); Stefy Patel (India)

Participants
- Number of entries: 22
- Debuting countries: See list of participants
- Participation map: Participating countries

Vote
- Voting system: Each juror awarded 29, 25, 22, 20, 18–1 points to their favourite 22 songs
- Winning song: Vietnam "Phù Đổng Thiên Vương"

Intervision 2025 (Russian: Интервидение 2025, romanized: Intervideniye 2025), officially the Intervision 2025 International Music Contest, was an international song competition that took place at the Live Arena in Novoivanovskoye near the city of Moscow, Russia, on 20 September 2025. The event primarily featured representatives from BRICS, CIS, Latin American, African, Middle Eastern, South and Southeast Asian countries, each with a single entrant. Although its organiser, format, objectives, and set of participants differed from the original run, it was regarded as a revival of the Intervision Song Contest.

In a decree by Russian president Vladimir Putin, Deputy Prime Minister Dmitry Chernyshenko was appointed chairman of the organising committee, while the Russian foreign ministry was in charge of promoting the contest. The winner was Vietnam, represented by Đức Phúc with the song "Phù Đổng Thiên Vương".

== Background ==
The Intervision Song Contest was originally launched in the 1960s by the International Radio and Television Organisation (OIRT) as an alternative to the Eurovision Song Contest for the Eastern Bloc of states, but was eventually discontinued in 1980. After 28 years, in 2008; an unrelated song contest entitled Five Stars: Intervision took place, this time featuring countries from the Commonwealth of Independent States, the Shanghai Cooperation Organisation, and the former Soviet Republics.

On 25 February 2022, following the start of the Russian invasion of Ukraine, the European Broadcasting Union (EBU) excluded Russia from the Eurovision Song Contest 2022, as "the inclusion of a Russian entry in [the 2022] contest would bring the competition into disrepute", following pressure from several participating broadcasters. On 26 February, the Russian member broadcasters of the EBU (RTR, Channel One, and RDO) announced their intention to withdraw from the union following their exclusion from the contest. On 1 March, the EBU suspended their membership, and on 26 May, the suspension became indefinite, making them ineligible to participate in any EBU events.

On 3 February 2025, Russian president Vladimir Putin ordered the return of an Intervision Song Contest by decree, inviting "friendly" countries to the contest, with the goal of "developing international cultural and humanitarian cooperation". The new contest is also supposed to, according to Russian senator Lilia Gumerova, "promote real music" and reject "fake values that are alien to any normal person", referring to Eurovision's inclusion of acts such as drag performer Conchita Wurst, who won the Eurovision Song Contest 2014 for Austria. The contestants are encouraged to "emphasise respect for traditional universal, spiritual and family values". Russian foreign minister Sergey Lavrov suggested that Intervision would be free of "perversion and abuse of human nature, as we saw in the Paris Olympics".

On 26 May 2025, the Ministry of Foreign Affairs of Ukraine stated that it viewed the event "as an instrument of hostile propaganda and a means of whitewashing the aggressive policy of the Russian Federation". The ministry instructed its foreign diplomatic missions to take measures of "political and diplomatic response" against countries that intend to take part in Intervision, with the aim of persuading countries with which Ukraine has at least neutral relations to opt out of the event.

On 16 September 2025, Russian foreign minister Sergey Lavrov claimed that there were countries whose artists were willing to participate in the contest, but their governments prevented them from participating. He added: "We will not name these countries in order to avoid difficulties [in the future]. Anyone who wants to come will always be welcome."

== Location ==
On 29 October 2023, Russian prime minister Mikhail Mishustin announced plans for an Intervision Song Contest to be held in 2024 in Saint Petersburg. However, on 21 March 2024, the planned location was changed to Moscow and a budget of 600 million ₽ was allocated for the event. In June, the contest was postponed to 2025.

=== Venue ===
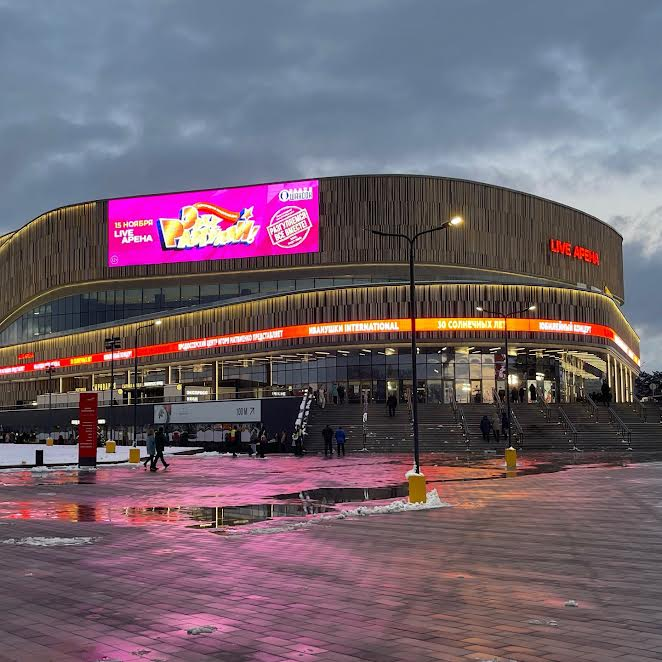
Live Arena was the host venue

The venue had to be able to sustain a capacity of at least 5,000 spectators. The contest was held in Live Arena, which is located in Novoivanovskoye, an urban-type settlement in the Odintsovsky District of the Moscow region of Russia. Opened in 2022, Live Arena is a multi-purpose entertainment complex located with a seating capacity of up to 11,000 spectators.

== Format and production ==
=== Graphic design and slogan ===
On 16 May 2025, the logo and slogan of the contest was revealed by the organisers. The logo is based on a rhombus inspired by Russian suprematism. The graphic design maintains visual continuity with the old contest of 1965–1980 but also incorporates modern elements to "emphasise the relevance" of the event. According to the organisers, the chosen slogan "Music in the heart of your country" (Russian: Музыка в сердце твоей страны, romanized: Muzyka v serdtse tvoyey strany) is supposed to illustrate the unifying nature of the event as music holds the ability to "make a million hearts beat in unison".

=== Entries ===
Entries were supposed to be pieces "popular in the [participant's] country as of the date of the Contest Final", and released within the year preceding the contest, performed by no more than six people on stage.

Documents seen by Reuters stated that "artists may not perform songs that call for violence, humiliate the honour and dignity of society, and it is required that political themes in the lyrics are completely excluded". Participants had up to four minutes and could sing in any language they wish. The winner would be awarded a trophy and 30 million ₽.

=== Voting ===
The results were determined by an international jury from the competing countries. Each competing country provides one juror, defined as "a cultural figure from their respective country (such as a producer, pop artist, composer, musician, teacher, etc.) recognized as a professional in the music industry".

- Belarus – Olga Shlyager
- Brazil – Cacá Machado
- China – Wu Bixia
- Colombia – Jorge Zorro
- Cuba – Adriana Pazos Tacoronte
- Egypt – Mohsen Sayed Ahmed Issa
- Ethiopia – Sultan Nuri
- India – Jaan Nissar Lone
- Kazakhstan – Zhanat Mukanov
- Kenya – Peter Chuani
- Kyrgyzstan – Yryskeldi Osmonkulov
- Madagascar – Mamy Gotso
- Qatar – Khalid Al-Salem
- Russia – Igor Matvienko
- Saudi Arabia – Ahmed Karkanavi
- Serbia – Mirko Radenović
- South Africa – Ntsiki Mazwai
- Tajikistan – Amirbeki Muso
- United Arab Emirates – Jassim Mohammed Abdulla
- United States – Joe Lynn Turner
- Uzbekistan – Mansur Tashmatov
- Venezuela – Estelín Polanco
- Vietnam – Nguyễn Trọng Đài

=== Ambassadors ===
The following list includes Russian personalities who were announced as official ambassadors of the contest by the organisers.

- Dima Bilan (announced on 12 June 2025)
- Klava Koka (announced on 19 July 2025)
- Ay Yola (announced on 3 August 2025)
- Pelageya (announced on 22 August 2025)
- Alexander Ovechkin (announced on 23 August 2025)

== Participants ==
The Russian government directly coordinated participation with foreign governments. A list of 20 countries confirmed to participate in the contest was publicly announced on 12 June during a press conference, with Madagascar additionally confirmed as a participant on 25 July. On 19 August, Azerbaijan and the United Arab Emirates were announced to have withdrawn, while Ethiopia and Kenya were announced to be participating the following day. On 27 August, Brazil was added to the list and the United Arab Emirates was reinstated.

During the contest's final, the hosts announced that the United States' entrant, Vassy, would not be performing. They claimed that this was due to "unprecedented political pressure from the Australian government", as Vassy is a dual citizen of both countries. In a later interview with Australia's ABC, Vassy expressed disappointment and was "reluctant to give further details until she spoke with the Australian government". The Australian Department of Foreign Affairs and Trade, meanwhile, said it had "no engagement" with the organisers of Intervision. The US continued to participate as a juror.

It is not known whether government officials and/or organisations from China, Kenya, Serbia and United States took part in the selection of their countries' respective entries.

Key

Withdrew

List of participants of Intervision 2025
Country	Entity	Artist	Song	Language	Songwriter(s)	Ref.
Belarus	Belteleradio	Nastya Kravchenko	"Motylyok" (Мотылёк)	Russian	Anastasiya Kravchenko	
Brazil	MinC	Luciano Calazans and Tais Nader	"Pipoca com amor"	Portuguese	Tais Nader	
China	N/A	Wang Xi	"Zài lùshàng" (在路上)	Mandarin	Simon Mongtrison; Alex Hong	
Colombia	MinCulturas	Nidia Góngora	"En los manglares"	Spanish	Nidia Sofía Góngora Bonilla	
Cuba	MINCULT	Zulema Iglesias Salazar	"Guaguancó"	Spanish	Ángel Toirac; Rodrigo Sosa; Zulema Iglesias Salazar	
Egypt	TEN TV	Mustafa Saad	"Ben elbanat" (بن البنات)	Arabic	Nabil Abdulrahman	
Ethiopia	Balageru TV	Netsanet Sultan	"Halaala" (ሃላላ)	Amharic	Samigo Ayele	
India	ARMS Record Label	Rauhan Malik	"Ishq" (इश्क़)	Hindi	Amir Ameer	
Kazakhstan	MCS RK	Amre	"Dala tañy" (Дала таңы)	Kazakh	Sayat Rakhymzhan	
Kenya	N/A	Sanaipei	"Flavour"	Swahili, English	Natasha Sanaipei Tande	
Kyrgyzstan	MMSJJSM	Nomad	"Jalgyz saga" (Жалгыз сага)	Kyrgyz, Russian	Murzali Jeenbayev; Mahabat Moldaliyeva	
Madagascar	Real TV	D-Lain and Denise	"Tiako hanjeky"	Malagasy	Ratolojanahary Lalaina; Denise Ep Be	
Qatar	MCQ	Dana Al Meer	"Huwa dha anta" (هو ذا أنت)	Arabic	Ahmad Handan	
Russia	NMG; MKRF	Shaman	"Pryamo po serdtsu" (Прямо по сердцу)	Russian	Maxim Fadeev	
Saudi Arabia	MoCSA	Zena Emad	"Mojrad ham" (مجرّد هم)	Arabic	Saham; Dhai	
Serbia	N/A	Slobodan Trkulja and Balkanopolis	"Tri ružice" (Три ружице)	Serbian	Slobodan Trkulja	
South Africa	DSAC	Mzansi Jikelele	"Home"	English, Zulu	Mckenzie Mpho Matome; Zakhele Peter Mabena	
Tajikistan	VFChT	Farrukh Hasanov	"Gori!" (Гори!)	Russian, English	Natan Dushevno; Farrukh Khasanzoda	
United Arab Emirates	MoC	Saif al-Ali	"Dawaa lilsalam" (دواء للسلام)	Arabic	Ali Al Khawar	
United States (Note: During the contest's final, the hosts announced that the United States' entrant, Vassy, would not be performing. It was claimed by them that this was due to "unprecedented political pressure from the Australian government", as Vassy is a dual citizen of both countries. The US continued to participate as a juror.)	N/A	Vassy	"Midnight"	English	Andrew James Charlton Hill; Justin George Shave; Phil Bentley; Vasiliki Karagiorgos	
Uzbekistan	ORMSIV	Shokhrukh Mirzo Ganiev	"Sensan sevarim" (Сенсан севарим)	Uzbek	Abdulla Sobir Lutfi	
Venezuela	MinCultura	Omar Acedo	"La fiesta de la paz"	Spanish	Omar Rafael Acedo Sánchez	
Vietnam	DatVietVAC; MoCST	Đức Phúc	"Phù Đổng Thiên Vương"	Vietnamese, English, Russian	Trương Anh Phúc; Khương Hoàn Mỹ; Hồ Hoài Anh; Nguyễn Duy	

=== Other countries ===
The following countries expressed interest, were invited, or even "confirmed" by the organisers. However, they were all ultimately not in the list of participants announced by Russia.

- Armenia – On 6 April 2025, the Special Representative of the President of the Russian Federation for International Cultural Cooperation, Mikhail Shvydkoy, stated that on 7 April he would go to a meeting with the Minister of Culture of Armenia, Zhanna Andreasyan, to find out to what extent Armenia is ready to participate in the contest. The media later regularly mentioned Armenia as one of the countries confirmed to participate in the contest. On 16 September, the Minister of Foreign Affairs of Russia Sergey Lavrov confirmed that Armenia had not explained in any way the reasons for its refusal to participate in the contest, even though they got the invitation.
- Azerbaijan – On 12 June, the country appeared on the official list of participants. Amid speculations of a potential withdrawal of Azerbaijan due to the 2025 Azerbaijan–Russia diplomatic crisis, on 7 July, Anastasia Grigorieva, spokesperson of Press for Intervision confirmed the country hadn't communicated its withdrawal at the time and was still set to participate. However, on 19 August, it was confirmed that Azerbaijan withdrew from the contest. On 20 August, the Azerbaijani state news agency Report İnformasiya Agentliyi stated that the official reason for Azerbaijan's withdrawal from participation in the contest was due to "internal circumstances and lack of time for preparation", while first deputy chairwoman of the State Duma's Culture Committee, Yelena Drapeko, stated that country's withdrawal was "a continuation of its general policy of distancing itself from Russia" in the face of the above-mentioned diplomatic crisis.
- Bolivia – On 26 April 2024, Lavrov told Russian media that the Bolivian government had been invited to organise Bolivia's debut in the contest.
- Hungary – On 6 April 2025, Shvydkoy said that negotiations were underway with the Government of Hungary on their participation in the contest.
- Iran – The country is a member of BRICS, which the organisers have listed as an organisation whose members they intended to invite to participate in the contest. Russian media regularly mentioned Iran as one of the countries confirmed to participate in the contest.
- Mexico – On 19 April 2025, Mexico's ambassador to Russia Eduardo Villegas said in an interview that, according to his information, Mexico would take part in Intervision 2025. He added that he thought a decision on the choice of representative would not be made before June or July.
- North Korea – On 22 July 2025, the Intervision press office confirmed in a conversation with Russian media that the organisers had sent an invitation to participate in Intervision 2025 to North Korean representatives.
- Pakistan – On 2 December 2024, Speaker of the National Assembly of Pakistan Ayaz Sadiq stated that Pakistan was ready to participate in Intervision 2025, but found it difficult to answer the question whether artists from Pakistan had already been invited to Intervision.
- Slovakia – The country was included in the list of countries that the organisers intended to invite to participate in the contest.
- Thailand – On 25 March 2025, Shvydkoy stated that the Thai government had "politically approved" the country's participation in Intervision 2025. Russian media later mentioned Thailand as one of the countries confirmed to participate in the contest.
- Turkmenistan – Russian media regularly mentioned Turkmenistan as one of the countries confirmed to participate in the contest.

== Contest overview ==
The event took place on 20 September 2025 and featured 23 competing countries. The running order (R/O) was determined by a random draw on 12 September. Before she was set to go on stage, it was announced that Vassy, representing the United States, was not allowed to perform "due to pressure from the Department of Foreign Affairs and Trade of Australia". Vietnam won the contest with 422 points, with Kyrgyzstan, Qatar, Colombia, Tajikistan, Belarus, Kazakhstan, Madagascar, China, and Uzbekistan completing the top ten. Saudi Arabia, Kenya, Ethiopia, Egypt, and Brazil occupied the bottom five positions.

Key

Winner
Withdrawn

Results of Intervision 2025
R/O	Country	Artist	Song	Points	Place
1	Cuba	Zulema Iglesias Salazar	"Guaguancó"	285	11
2	Kyrgyzstan	Nomad	"Jalgyz saga"	373	2
3	China	Wang Xi	"Zài lùshàng"	328	9
4	Egypt	Mustafa Saad	"Ben elbanat"	166	20
~~5~~	~~United States~~	~~Vassy~~	~~"Midnight"~~	Withdrawn	
6	Kenya	Sanaipei	"Flavour"	214	18
7	Kazakhstan	Amre	"Dala tañy"	339	7
8	United Arab Emirates	Saif al-Ali	"Dawaa lilsalam"	232	16
9	Russia	Shaman	"Pryamo po serdtsu"	Not ranked (Note: Officially it is unknown why Russia was not included in the final results. After his performance, the representative of Russia, Shaman, addressed the audience and asked the jury to skip him in the voting, as "he was not interested in competing for victory, but rather in ensuring hospitality and giving other participants a chance".)	
10	Brazil	Luciano Calazans and Tais Nader	"Pipoca com amor"	164	21
11	Tajikistan	Farrukh Hasanov	"Gori!"	344	5
12	Qatar	Dana Al Meer	"Huwa dha anta"	369	3
13	Madagascar	D-Lain and Denise	"Tiako hanjeky"	338	8
14	Saudi Arabia	Zena Emad	"Mojrad ham"	224	17
15	Colombia	Nidia Góngora	"En los manglares"	347	4
16	Ethiopia	Netsanet Sultan	"Halaala"	179	19
17	Venezuela	Omar Acedo	"La fiesta de la paz"	268	13
18	Serbia	Slobodan Trkulja and Balkanopolis	"Tri ružice"	236	14
19	South Africa	Mzansi Jikelele	"Home"	233	15
20	Vietnam	Đức Phúc	"Phù Đổng Thiên Vương"	422	1
21	Belarus	Nastya Kravchenko	"Motylyok"	341	6
22	Uzbekistan	Shokhrukh Mirzo Ganiev	"Sensan sevarim"	296	10
23	India	Rauhan Malik	"Ishq"	272	12

== Detailed voting results ==
These detailed results are incomplete, as only the highest scores awarded by each juror were revealed during the broadcast.

Detailed jury voting results of Intervision 2025
		Total score	Belarus	Brazil	Venezuela	Vietnam	Egypt	India	Kazakhstan	Qatar	Kenya	China	Colombia	Cuba	Kyrgyztan	Madagascar	United Arab Emirates	Russia	Serbia	United States	Tajikistan	Uzbekistan	Ethiopia	South Africa	Saudi Arabia
Contestants	Cuba	285		20	12	15	20			18		16	16		22	22	20	20		20	20			20	20
Contestants	Kyrgyzstan	373	20		**29**	20	18		18	15	18	22	18	20		**29**	22	22		16	16	16	13		16
Contestants	China	328	**29**	18				12	20		20		20	16	15				22			22	25		
Contestants	Egypt	166														18			16						
Contestants	Kenya	214		13									14		13	20							20	16	
Contestants	Kazakhstan	339	25		15	18	13				15	**29**		14	25		25	25	15	17	17	20	14		17
Contestants	United Arab Emirates	232	13			22	12		15					12		17									
Contestants	Brazil	164			20			14																	
Contestants	Tajikistan	344	17	17	25	14	17	15	12	17	**29**	18	13		16		16	16	20			15		15	
Contestants	Qatar	369		14	16	**29**	15	**29**			16	14	15	25	17	13			**29**	15	15	17	18	22	15
Contestants	Madagascar	338	15		22	17	14	18	**29**	13	25	13		22	**29**		17	17				13	15	18	
Contestants	Saudi Arabia	224		16			16	22	13	16		15			12	15	15	15							
Contestants	Colombia	347		**29**	14	13	22		17	22	13			**29**	20		14	14		25	25			**29**	25
Contestants	Ethiopia	179								14						14						12			
Contestants	Venezuela	268	14	25						12		12		15		25			17	12	12		22	17	12
Contestants	Serbia	236	18	12				13												18	18	18			18
Contestants	South Africa	233																							
Contestants	**Vietnam**	**422**	22	22	17			25	25	**29**	22		25	13	14		13	13	18	**29**	**29**	25	**29**	25	**29**
Contestants	Belarus	341			13	25		20	16	20		20	**29**				**29**	**29**	25			**29**	17		
Contestants	Uzbekistan	296				16		16	22		17	25	22	17					13	22	22			13	22
Contestants	India	272	16				**29**				14		17			16	18	18	14	14	14		16	12	14

=== 29 points ===
The table below summarises how the maximum 29 points were awarded from one country to another. The winning country is shown in bold. Vietnam received the maximum score of 29 points from five countries, with Belarus receiving four sets of 29 points. Qatar and Colombia each receive three sets, Kyrgyzstan and Madagascar receive two, and Kazakhstan, China, Tajikistan, and India each receive one maximum score.

Distribution of 29 points awarded at Intervision 2025
N.	Contestant	Nation(s) giving 29 points
5	**Vietnam**	Qatar, United States, Tajikistan, Ethiopia, Saudi Arabia
4	Belarus	Colombia, United Arab Emirates, Russia, Uzbekistan
3	Qatar	Vietnam, India, Serbia
3	Colombia	Brazil, Cuba, South Africa
2	Kyrgyzstan	Venezuela, Madagascar
2	Madagascar	Kazakhstan, Kyrgyzstan
1	Kazakhstan	China
1	China	Belarus
1	Tajikistan	Kenya
1	India	Egypt

== Broadcasts ==
Known details on the broadcasts in each country, including the specific broadcasting stations and commentators, are shown in the tables below. An international live stream was also available through YouTube.

Brazil, Kenya, and Saudi Arabia participated in the contest, but according to the official broadcast schedule, the final would not be shown by their local broadcasters for unknown reasons.

Confirmed broadcasters and commentators in participating countries
Country	Time	Broadcaster	Channel(s)	Commentator(s)	Ref.
Belarus	Live	Belteleradio	Belarus-1	Vladimir Bogdan and Nikolay Sosin	
China	Unknown	CMG	CCTV	Unknown	
Colombia	Delayed	RTVC	Señal Colombia	Laura Galindo	
Cuba	Delayed	TVC	Cubavisión	Unknown	
Egypt	Delayed	TEN TV		No commentary	
Ethiopia	Live	Balageru TV		No commentary	
India	Live	ITV Network	NewsX	No commentary	
Kazakhstan	Live	Channel One Eurasia		Unknown	
Kyrgyzstan	Live	NTRK	KTRK	Unknown	
Kyrgyzstan	Live	NTRK	Muzyka	Unknown	
Kyrgyzstan	Live	NTRK	Madaniyat Taryh Til	Unknown	
Madagascar	Live	Real TV		Mendrika Razafindratsima and Alain	
Qatar	Unknown	QMC	QTV	Unknown	
Russia	Live	C1R		Yana Churikova and Yuriy Aksyuta	
Russia	Live	VK Video		No commentary (Note: The broadcast was aired on VK Video without commentary while Nansi & Sidorov presented interrupts from on-site studio between entries.)	
Serbia	Live	Toxic Entertainment	Toxic TV	Filip Popović and Miljan Tanić	
South Africa	Delayed	SABC	SABC 3	Unknown	
South Africa	Live	SABC	SABC+	Unknown	
Tajikistan	Unknown	TVS		Unknown	
United Arab Emirates	Unknown	ADMN	ADTV	Unknown	
Uzbekistan	Unknown	Zo'r TV		Unknown	
Venezuela	Live	SiBCI	TVES	No commentary (Note: TVES provided oral simultaneous interpretation to Spanish for the broadcast as well as provided the running line with biographies of entrants; however, there were no commentators of the show.)	
Vietnam	Delayed	VTV	VTV3	Sơn Lâm and Hằng	
