= Motylyok =

2025 single by Nastya Kravchenko

Single by Nastya Kravchenko
- Language: Russian
- English title: Moth
- Released: 11 July 2025
- Length: 3:00
- Label: Headliner Music
- Composer: Nikolay Sosin
- Lyricist: Anastasiya Igorievna Kravchenko

Nastya Kravchenko singles chronology
"Svetofory" (2025)	"Motylyok" (2025)	"Sila" (2025)

Music video
- "Motylyok" on YouTube

"Motylyok" (Russian: Мотылёк, transl. Moth) is a song by Belarusian singer Nastya Kravchenko. The single was released on 11 July 2025 and represented Belarus in the Intervision 2025. The song peaked at number 37 at Belarusian airplay chart.

== Background and composition ==
The song was written only by the artist herself and fully composed by Nikolay Sosin, a Ukrainian television producer known in Belarus mostly as the music composer working for Belarusian talent show Factor.BY aired on Belarus-1.

On 30 May 2025, the singer stated in an interview for Belarusian Telegraph Agency that at that point, the song did not yet have a title.

The artist said in a comment for the Belteleradio's Pervyy informatsionnyy that the song "is dedicated for those who are looking for the strength to overcome challenges and believe in themselves. It's a reminder that we can all make our dreams come true."

Additionally, it was noted on the Intervision's press release, that the song is based on the author's personal story. According to the article, Nastya Kravchenko "wrote it at a difficult time in her life, when external circumstances and internal fears and uncertainty almost forced her to give up her dreams of becoming a singer. However, she understood that the only way forward was to believe in herself and keep going, and she did not give up. Nastya conveyed her experiences in the song through the image of a moth – a symbol of transformation and hope. The lyrics are filled with metaphors: masks, fragile porcelain dolls and crystal tears symbolise human illusions and vulnerability. But the main message of the song – 'I am alive' – says that each of us is capable of overcoming any difficulties."

== Promotion ==
On 9 July 2025, Belarusian national broadcaster Belteleradio confirmed that the song will be first performed live the next day during Slavianski Bazaar in Vitebsk.

The official release of the studio version of the song took place on First National Channel of Belarusian Radio's YouTube channel on 11 July 2025, shortly after the performance was published online.

The song was released to all streaming services on 22 July 2025 by Headliner Music.

The music wideo was directed by Russian director Oksana Rasskazova.

== Intervision 2025 ==
=== Internal selection ===
On 28 February 2025, Belarusian national broadcaster Belteleradio opened submission window for Intervision 2025.

On 19 May 2025, Belteleradio announced that Nastya Kravchenko had been selected from among 37 entries to represent Belarus at Intervision 2025. The broadcaster confirmed that the singer was selected by a specially appointed focus group, in which 8 out of 13 members voted for Kravchenko.

=== At Intervision ===
The Intervision 2025 took place at Live Arena in Novoivanovskoye, (Note: Labelled as Moscow in promotional material) Russia, and consisted of final held on 20 September 2025, in which Belarus ultimately placed 5th with 341 points.

== Commercial performance ==
In Belarus, the song debuted at number 39 on TopHit's Belarusian airplay chart dated 24 July 2025. The next week dated 31 July 2025 it peaked at number 37.

== Charts ==
=== Weekly charts ===
Weekly chart performance for "Motylyok"
Chart (2025)	Peak position
Belarus Airplay (TopHit)	37

=== Monthly charts ===
Monthly chart performance for "Motylyok"
Chart (2025)	Peak position
Belarus Airplay (TopHit)	52
