= Denise (singer) =

Malagasy singer (born 1989)

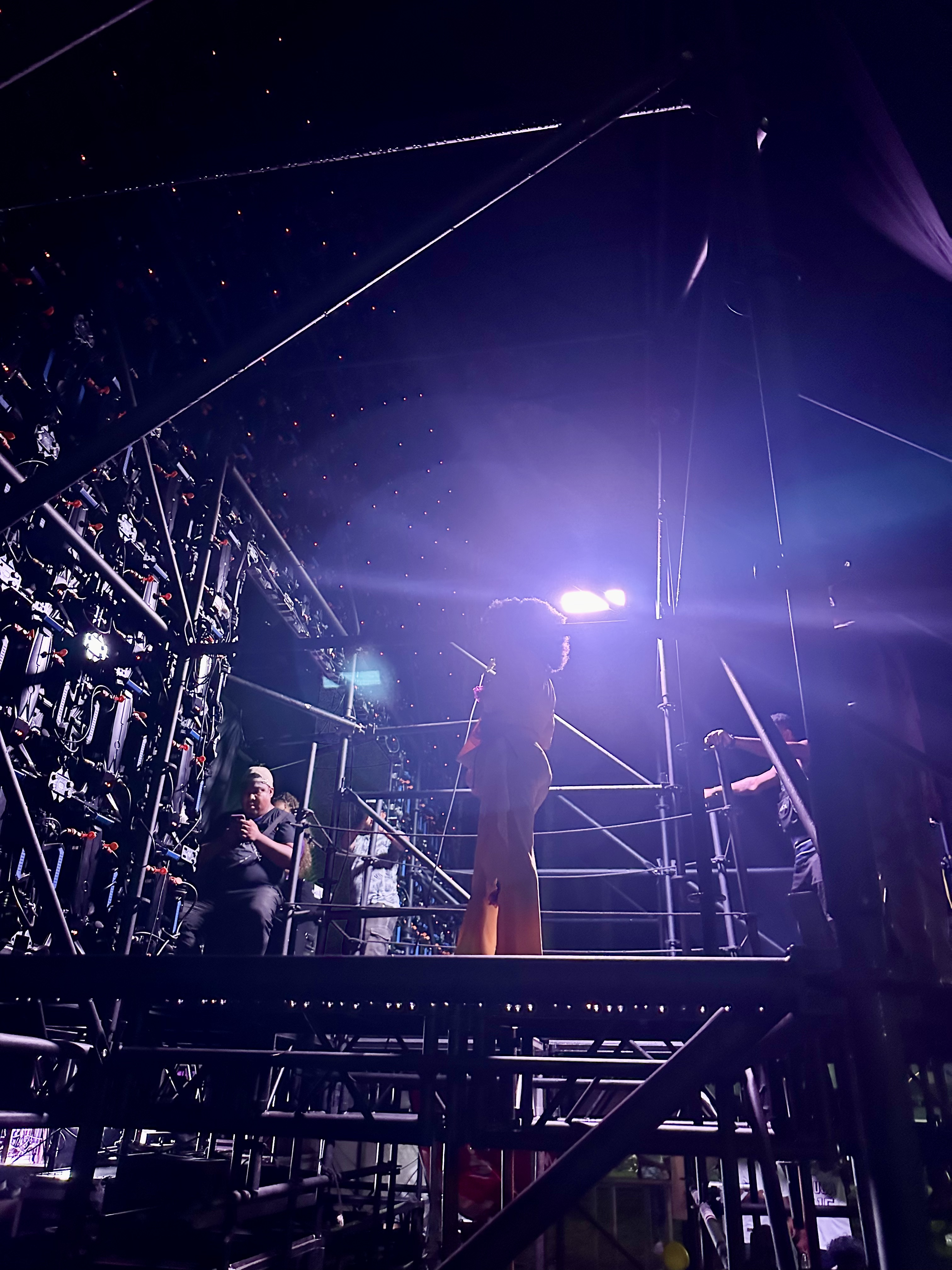
- Denise in 2024

Background information
- Also known as: Deenyz
- Born: 20 March 1989 (age 37); Toamasina, Madagascar
- Occupation: Singer
- Years active: 2003-present

Denise, formerly Deenyz, (born March 20, 1989) is a Malagasy singer. She gained international prominence with her victory in Island Africa Talent in 2014. She represented Madagascar at Intervision 2025 alongside singer D-Lain with the song "Tiako hanjeky", finishing 8th with 338 points.

== Biography ==
Denise was born in Toamasina on March 20, 1989. She began her career in 2003 at the age of 13 with R&B and soul music and was signed with Rosat Records. Her music is in Malagasy, but she can also speak French and English. She is married to Shyn.

== Career ==
She signed with Destiny Records in 2013 after meeting artist Ray Neiman. She went on to represent Madagascar at Island Africa Talent in 2014, which she won, receiving 5 million CFA francs. In 2017, she signed with Universal Music Africa (UMA). For songs of hers like Allofo, produced through UMA, she used both Afro pop and more traditional African elements to create the song. She has cited Miriam Makeba and Brenda Fassie as influences. Also in 2017, she featured on Coke Studio Africa alongside Jason Derulo.

During the COVID-19 pandemic, Denise recorded live sessions of her music, part of a trend.

On 25th July 2025, Malagasy broadcaster Real TV announced that Denise and D-Lain will represent Madagascar at Intervision 2025 in Moscow. Out of 22 participants, Madagascar placed 8th with the song "Tiako hanjeky".
