= Aleksandra Vorobyova =

Russian singer (born 1989)

- Born: Aleksandra Andreyevna Vorobyova; 24 December 1989 (age 36); Engels, Saratov Oblast, Russian SFSR, USSR
- Genres: Pop
- Occupation: Singer
- Instrument: Vocals
- Label: Universal Music Russia

Alexandra Andreyevna Vorobyova (Russian: Александра Андреевна Воробьёва; born 24 December 1989), also known as Sasha Vorobyeva (Russian: Саша Воробьева), is a Russian singer.

On 26 December 2014 she won the Russian reality television singing competition Golos, based on The Voice series, with the other finalist Yaroslav Dronov coming as runner-up. In the final round she got near 55% of votes. She was coached by the Russian composer Alexander Gradsky.

Preceded by Sergei Volchkov	Winner of Golos; 2014	Succeeded by Hieromonk Fotiy
