= Đức Phúc =

Vietnamese singer

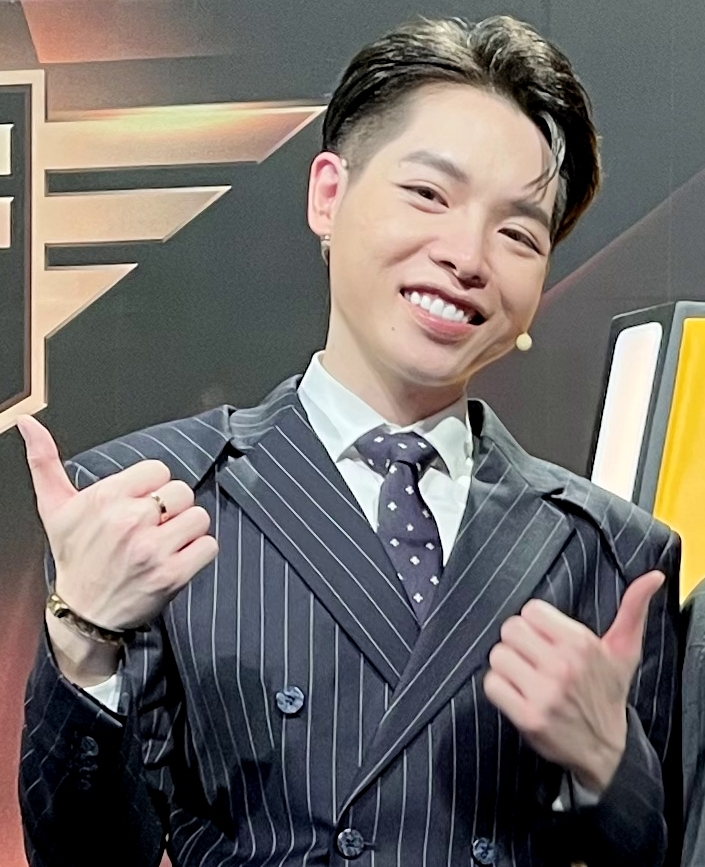
- Đức Phúc in 2021

Background information
- Born: Nguyễn Đức Phúc; 15 October 1996 (age 29); Hanoi, Vietnam
- Occupations: Singer; actor
- Musical career
- Genres: V-pop; R&B; dance-pop; EDM; ballad
- Instrument: Vocals
- Years active: 2015–present

Nguyễn Đức Phúc (born 15 October 1996), commonly known as Đức Phúc, is a Vietnamese singer and the winner of Intervision 2025.

== Early life and career ==
Đức Phúc was born on 15 October 1996 in Hanoi, Vietnam.

In September 2015, he won the third season of The Voice of Vietnam (Giọng hát Việt).

In 2024, Phúc participated in the first season of Hot Bros "Say Hi" and made it to the top 5.

In September 2025, Phúc won Intervision 2025 in Moscow with the song "Phù Đổng Thiên Vương", coming first out of 23 entries, exactly ten years after winning The Voice.

== Discography ==
=== Charted singles ===
==== As lead artist ====
List of singles released as lead artist, showing year released, chart positions and album name
Title	Year	Peak chart positions		Album
Title	Year	VIE	VIE Viet.	Album
"Ngày đầu tiên"	2022	1	1	Non-album singles
"Quá khứ đôi, hiện tại đơn"	2022	14	10	Non-album singles
"Em đồng ý (I Do)" (with 911)	2023	1	1	Non-album singles
"Phù Đổng Thiên Vương"	2025	—	70	Non-album singles
"—" denotes items which were not released in that country or failed to chart.

Awards and achievements
Preceded by Debut	Vietnam in the Intervision Song Contest; 2025	Most recent
Preceded by (Tajikistan) Tahmina Niyazova with "Hero"	Winner of the Intervision Song Contest; 2025	Most recent
