= Yarsky District =

Yarsky District Ярский район (Russian)
- District

Other transcription(s)
  - Udmurt: Яр ёрос
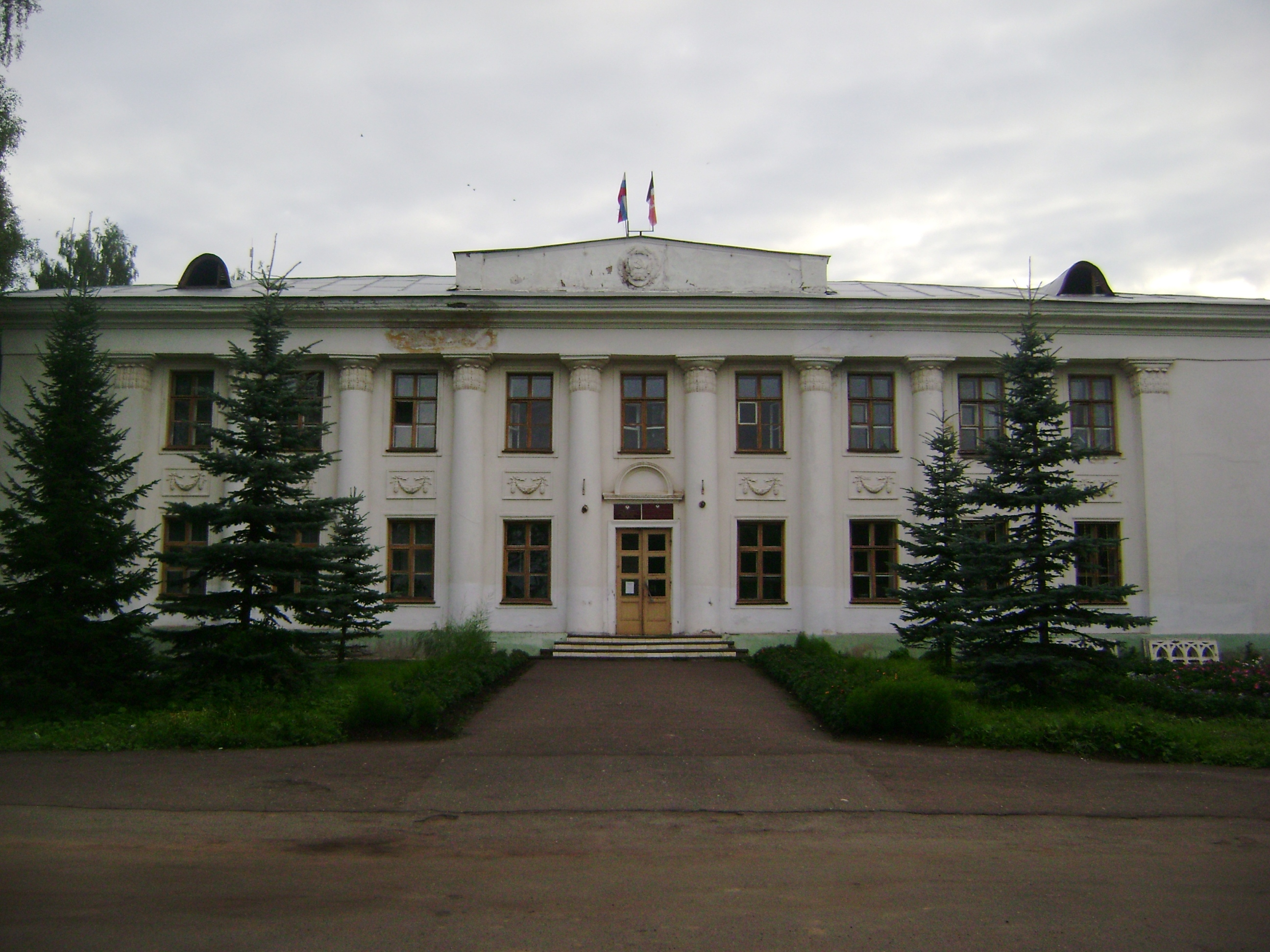
- Yarsky District Administration building in Yar

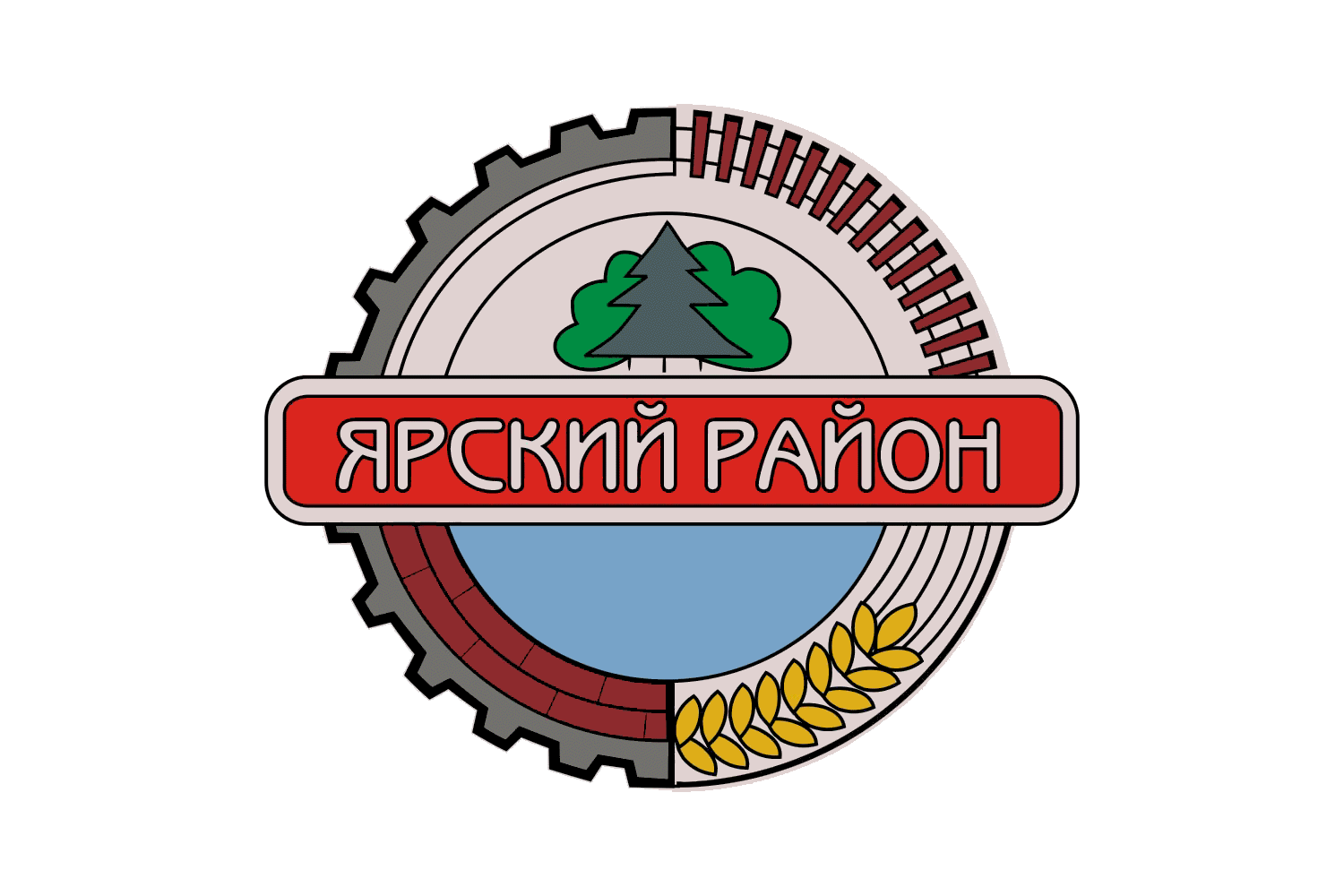
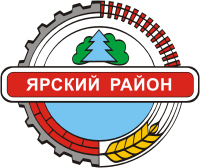
- Flag Coat of arms
- Location of Yarsky District in the Udmurt Republic
- Coordinates: 58.245°N 51.503°E
- Country: Russia
- Federal subject: Udmurt Republic
- Established: 15 July 1929
- Administrative center: Yar

Area
  - Total: 1,524.3 km^{2} (588.5 sq mi)

Population (2010 Census)
  - Total: 15,286
  - Density: 10.028/km^{2} (25.973/sq mi)
  - Urban: 43.2%
  - Rural: 56.8%

Administrative structure
  - Administrative divisions: 11 selsoviet
  - Inhabited localities: 68 rural localities

Municipal structure
  - Municipally incorporated as: Yarsky Municipal District
  - Municipal divisions: 0 urban settlements, 10 rural settlements
- Time zone: UTC+4 (MSK+1)
- OKTMO ID: 94652000
- Website: http://www.yar.udmurt.ru/

Yarsky District (Russian: Я́рский райо́н; Udmurt: Яр ёрос, Jar joros) is an administrative and municipal district (raion), one of the twenty-five in the Udmurt Republic, Russia. It is located in the northwest of the republic. The area of the district is 1,524.3 square kilometers (588.5 sq mi). Its administrative center is the rural locality (a settlement) of Yar. Population: 15,286 (2010 census); 18,880 (2002 Census); 20,595 (1989 Soviet census). The population of Yar accounts for 43.2% of the district's total population.
