= Ya russkiy =

2022 single by Shaman

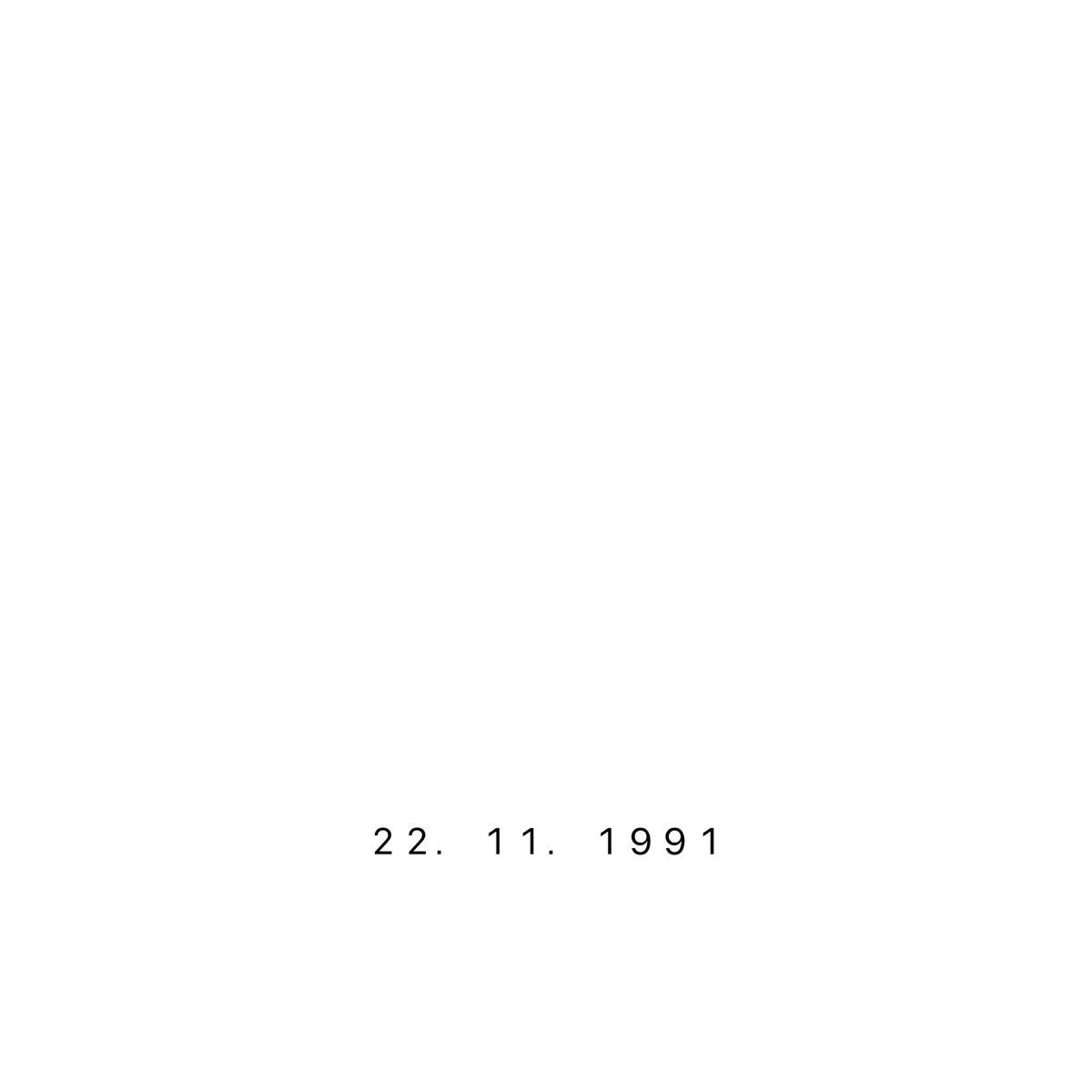

Song by Shaman
- English title: I'm Russian
- Released: 22 July 2022
- Recorded: 2022
- Genre: Pop rock

"Ya russkiy" (Russian: Я русский, 'I'm Russian') is a single by Russian singer Shaman, released on 22 July 2022.

== Composition ==
The performer of the song characterized its content as follows: "For me it is not a patriotic song, but first of all just a song that reflects the natural state of my soul since birth".

In a special report by Russia-24, the singer commented on several lines of the song. In particular, responded to criticism of the phrase "I am Russian to the whole world out of spite": Yaroslav stated that "'out of spite' is a synonym for the words 'in spite of', 'in spite of', 'in spite of', so there is no evil here, it's just a phrase established in the Russian language". He also deciphered the line "My blood is from the Father", which is repeated at the end of the song against the background of sounding bells: it refers to the Heavenly Father – God (i.e. it means "My blood is from God").

== Reception ==
Alexey Mazhayev of InterMedia gave the track a positive review, giving it 7 stars out of 10. The critic believes that the composition has "a very high quality melody, a confident delivery, a stunning voice – everything is in place and makes a powerful impression". At the same time, he noted that the text "in some places looks like it was approved by the Russian Foreign Ministry, but even the phrase "I am Russian to spite the world" in the performance of Yaroslav does not cut the ear and sounds quite natural".

Сritic Pavel Rudchenko noted that "the song encourages pride in one's country, in one's people", which explains the popularity of this composition.

Music critic Evgeny Babichev writes that Dronov has "an individual image, manner, vocal shimmers, which are rare among young artists. Perhaps this is the voice of a new generation". The critic notes that Dronov leads a "patriotic line", which is usually characteristic of singers like Oleg Gazmanov and Grigory Leps with an audience of people over 50 years old, but at the same time is oriented towards the youth.

Otar Kushanashvili called the performer of the song a "strange guy" who "screams 'I am Russian' because he knows the meaning of the word 'opportunism' very well". Ivan Konovalov also negatively assessed the composition, writing that the track "does not possess even a hint of intellectual value".

Music critic Artemy Troitsky was critical of the song: "...the content of the pacifist anthems 'Let There Always Be Sunshine' and 'Do Russians Want War?' doesn't evoke any objections from a normal person. The same cannot be said at all about the paranoid declarations of the same Shaman: 'I am Russian — out of spite to the whole world!'. Very typical, or rather, symptomatic of today's Russian sentiments/resentments. Resentment towards the whole world, malice, aggression. Moreover — in an asylum for the violently depressive".

Literary and music critic Yan Shenkman notes: "This video has already been turned into a patriotic fetish, but, if you think about it, you'll find few songs in Russian show business that are so un-Russian... Stylistically, it's typical American stadium pop-rock from the 1980s–2000s... What we have here is classic Russianness for export, something like the ushanka hats with a star sold from stalls on Arbat in the summer".

Music critic Yekaterina Kretova, on the contrary, states that Shaman works in the style of "Russian rock," which is what makes him interesting to Russians.

Ksenia Sobchak gave a negative review of the composition: "I honestly don't understand why we always need to contrast ourselves with someone else for self-identification. Why patriotic lyrics of modern Russia are built on universal resentment and at the same time pride that we are not like everyone else". According to journalist Tatyana Kondratyeva, "an unknown musician with romantic tracks" became one of the leaders in the number of views on YouTube "thanks to lines about dead soldiers and Russians" who support Russia's invasion of Ukraine.

== Controversies ==
In February 2023, a resident of Tula Oblast wrote a statement to the Criminal Investigation Department of the Russian Ministry of Internal Affairs in Tula Oblast stating that the song "Ya Russkiy" incites interethnic discord.

Yaroslav Dronov wrote a clarification in which he stated that the song "I am Russian" is not extremist, it passed checks before being published on music platforms and before being broadcast on Russian TV channels. He also added that his song is "known, loved and sung by representatives of completely different nationalities" living in Russia. For each of them, the phrase "I am Russian" means belonging to a common history and culture.

Elena Afanasyeva, a member of the Federation Council, asked the Prosecutor General's Office to check the citizen who wrote the statement against Yaroslav Dronov. She called the statement on the singer a natural incitement of Russophobia in Russia itself, a desire to intimidate Russians by nationality.

On August 30, 2022, Alexander Gudkov posted a parody of the song titled "I'm narrow" (Russian: Я узкий) on YouTube. The next day, the leader of the Russian Civil Committee, Artur Shlykov, asked the Investigative Committee of Russia to make a legal assessment and check the comedian's clip for the element of humiliation of honor and dignity of Russians on ethnic grounds.

== Patent ==
In October 2024, the singer filed to register the trademarks "Я русский" for the production of alcohol, cosmetics, and snacks. According to Shaman's press service, the trademark registration was carried out to prevent other entrepreneurs from using the song's title "Я русский" as a brand name.

== Charts ==
Within two days, the song's music video garnered two million views on YouTube. The video also debuted at number one on the Russian YouTube Music chart for July 27, 2022.

In July 2024, the music video of the song was removed from YouTube following an appeal from the Lithuanian Radio and Television Commission.
