= Belarus in the Intervision Song Contest =

- Participating broadcaster: Belteleradio (2025–present)

Participation summary
- Appearances: 2
- First appearance: 2008
- Highest placement: 6th: 2025

Belarus was represented at the Intervision Song Contest twice: in 2008 and in 2025.

== History ==
Belarus first participated in 2008, with The Champions representing the country. They placed seventh in the final with 153 points.

They participated seventeen years later in 2025 with the song "Motylyok" by Nastya Kravchenko. Belarus placed sixth, which is the country's highest placement to date.

After Intervision 2025, the Belarusian Telegraph Agency announced that the country would participate in 2026.

== Participation overview ==
Table key
†	Upcoming event

Year	Artist	Song(s)	Language	Place	Points
2008	The Champions	"Ya Begu Na Zemle" (Я бегу по земле)	Russian	7	153
2008	The Champions	"Tam, Gde Klen Shumit" (Там, где клен шумит)	Russian	7	153
2008	The Champions	"I Like to Move It"	English	7	153
2025	Nastya Kravchenko	"Motylyok" (Мотылёк)	Russian	6	341
2026	Upcoming †				

== Related involvement ==
=== Commentators and jurors ===
Year	Channel	Commentator(s)	Juror	Ref.
2025	Belarus-1	Vladimir Bogdan and Nikolay Sosin	Olga Shlyager	
