= Real TV Madagasikara =

Television channel in Madagascar

- Type: Private
- Industry: television
- Founded: 2017
- Headquarters: Antananarivo, Madagascar
- Owner: Real TV/94 FM

Real TV Madagasikara or simply Real TV is a private television channel based in Madagascar. The channel was founded by Onitiana Realy, formerly of TV Plus Madagascar. Its sister station is 94 FM.

On the morning of 7 April 2020, the station was taken off air due to vandalism in Ambohimitsimbina, but resumed its services on the morning of 11 April.

The channel as of 2023 was in a tense political situation, in which Gascar Fenosoa had his political discussion program in jeopardy. Onitiana Realy was known to have more transparency than the minister of communications and could destabilize the regime of the time. Gascar was audited for eight hours on 11 December.

On 28 July 2025, the channel was added to Canal+ Madagascar. On 30 July, it was announced that Real TV chose the singers, D-Lain and Denise, taking part at Intervision 2025.
