= Yekaterina Mizulina =

Russian politician (born 1984)

- Екатерина Мизулина
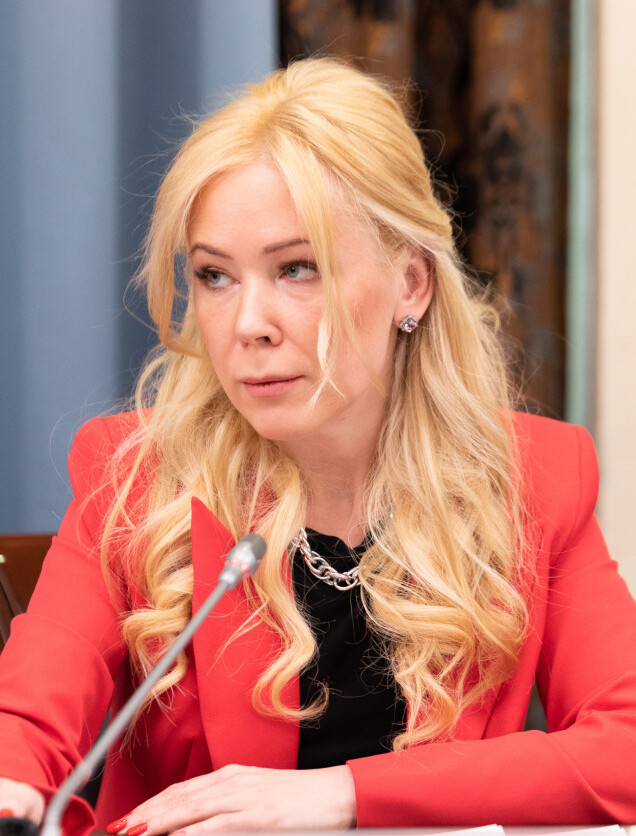
- Mizulina in 2023
- Born: Yekaterina Mikhailovna Mizulina; 1 September 1984 (age 41); Yaroslavl, RSFSR, Soviet Union
- Occupation: Public figure
- Spouse: Shaman (m. 2025)

Yekaterina Mikhailovna Mizulina (Russian: Екатерина Михайловна Мизулина; born September 1, 1984) is a Russian public figure, executive director of the National Center for Children's Assistance (2017–2020), member of the Civic Chamber of the Russian Federation, head of the Safe Internet League. She is the daughter of former Senator Yelena Mizulina.

== Biography ==
Yekaterina Mizulina was born in 1984 in Yaroslavl. In 2004, she graduated from the School of Oriental and African Studies at the University of London with a degree in art history and Indonesian language, and in 2010 from the Institute of Asian and African Countries. Even before this, she began working as a Chinese translator as part of official Russian delegations in China. Since 2015, she has worked in the field of charity (in particular, at the St. Basil the Great Foundation). In 2017, she was appointed director of the Association of Internet Industry Market Participants Safe Internet League, in 2018 executive director of the National Monitoring Center for Assistance to Missing and Victimized Children. Coordinates a program to train volunteers involved in the search for missing children.

In her activities, Mizulina advocates for censorship on the Internet, for fines and other sanctions against media and social networks that do not comply with Russian legislation. Her initiatives on this topic regularly find themselves in the spotlight of the media. According to journalists, Ekaterina Mizulina is not inferior to her mother in fame.

In 2023, she supported the claim of the Russian Ministry of Justice to the Supreme Court demanding that the international public LGBT movement be recognized as extremist, and its activities banned in Russia.

=== Sanctions ===
On January 29, 2024, Mizulina was included in the sanctions list of 27 EU countries for human rights violations and serious and systematic violations of freedom of expression.

== Personal life ==
Mizulina is the daughter of Yelena Mizulina and Mikhail Yuryevich Mizulin, a scholar and associate professor of political science. Her brother, Nikolai Mizulin, a lawyer, has been living in Belgium since the mid-2010s.

Mizulina has no children.

On March 9, 2025, during a performance, singer Shaman (born 1991) and Mizulina announced that they were in a relationship. On November 5 of the same year, they married in a ceremony held in Donetsk.

== Income and property ==
In January 2022, Alexei Navalny’s team, in a mini-investigation, estimated Mizulina’s wardrobe at more than 27 million rubles. Based on publicly available photographs, it emerged that Mizulina wears a Breguet watch worth 11 million rubles, as well as Burberry and Dolce&Gabbana clothing, Hermès accessories, Christian Louboutin shoes, and items from other luxury brands. The authors of the investigation noted that even her parents’ income would not have enabled Mizulina to afford such purchases: in 2020, her mother earned about 6 million rubles, and her father 1.4 million rubles.

According to journalistic investigations, Mizulina is registered and lives in a 212-square-meter apartment in Moscow, in an elite residential complex in Pogorelsky Lane, with an estimated value of 200 million rubles.
