= Toxic TV =

- Country: Serbia
- Headquarters: Belgrade, Serbia

Programming
- Language: Serbian language
- Picture format: 16:9 1080i (HDTV)

Ownership
- Owner: Toxic Television Network d.o.o. Beograd (Toxic Entertainment)
- Sister channels: Toxic Folk; Toxic Rap

History
- Launched: 15 December 2019

Links
- Website: www.toxictv.rs

Toxic TV (Serbian Cyrillic: Токсик ТВ) is a Serbian cable television channel owned by Toxic Television Network d.o.o. Beograd (also known as Toxic Entertainment) that received its license on 11 October 2019 and has been broadcasting since 15 December 2019. The channel airs music from regional artists and programs covering the entertainment scene. In the channel's early months, it was expected to include a string of premieres, which included interviews and live performances.

The channel broke its audience record on 19 April 2020, Easter in Orthodoxy, which was marked by the effects of the pandemic. The program was a Saša Matić concert in Kalemegdan had a share of 17,26%; 2 million viewers reached the channel during the concert. On 12 May 2020, regulator REM approved the launch of two sister channels, Toxic Folk and Toxic Rap. Toxic Rap started broadcasting in August, it specializes in Serbian and international rap music.

In August 2025, it was announced that Toxic TV would broadcast Intervision 2025 in Serbia, which took place on 20 September. For this end, a team of the channel was dispatched to Moscow.
