= Slobodan Trkulja =

Serbian musician and composer

Slobodan Trkulja Слободан Тркуља
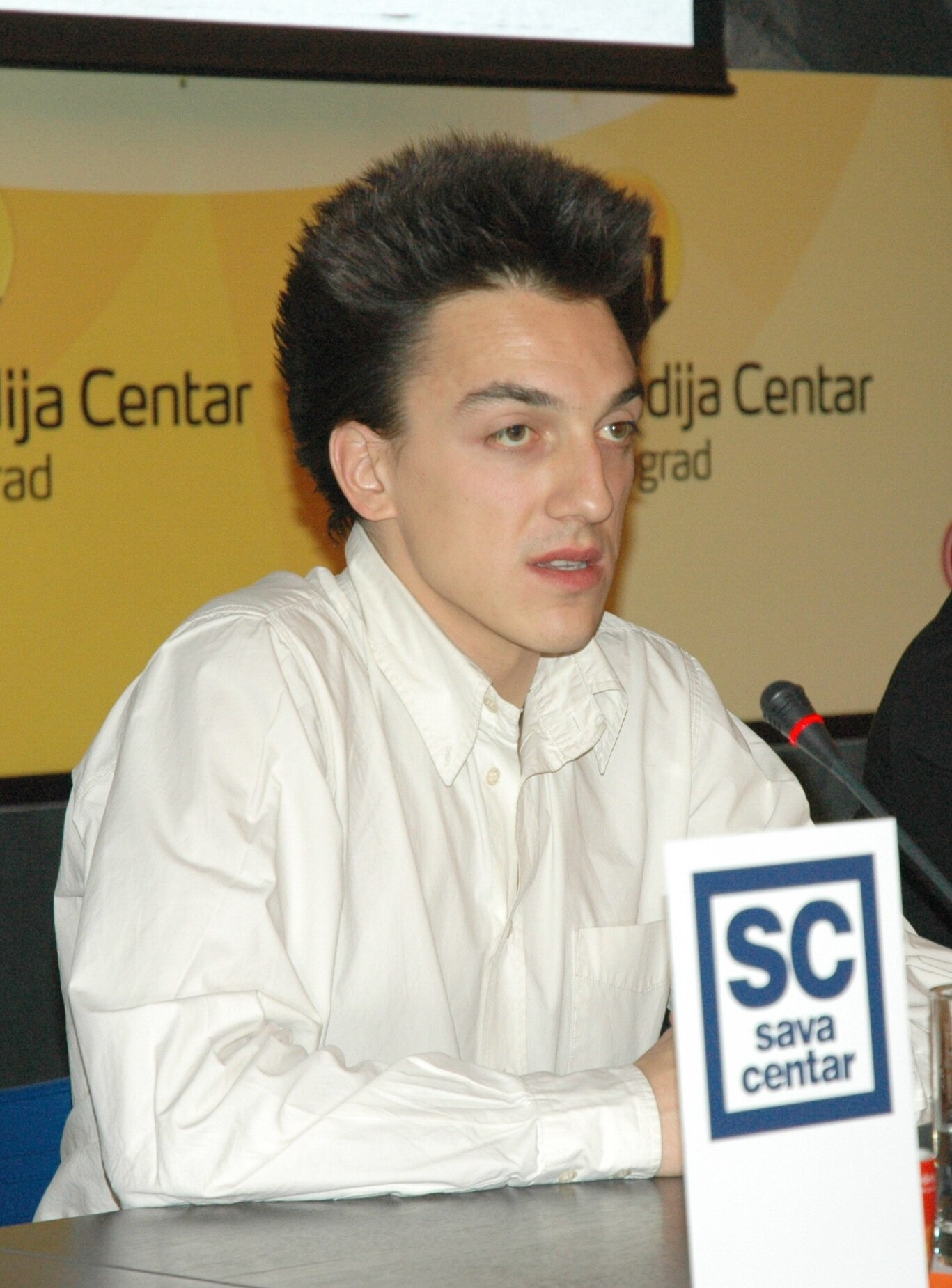
- Slobodan Trkulja in 2009

Background information
- Born: Slobodan Trkulja; 29 May 1977 (age 48); Odžaci, SR Serbia, SFR Yugoslavia
- Genres: Modern Balkan tradition, arena rock, orchestral, avantgard pop, rock, Byzantine chants, pop,
- Instruments: Clarinet; Bagpipes; Diple; Double flute Kaval; Flute; Acoustic Guitar; Tenor Saxophone; Drum Kit; Armenian Duduk; Ocarina; Alto Saxophone; Soprano Saxophone
- Years active: 1997–present
- Labels: Balkanopolis CMT

Slobodan Trkulja (pronounced [sloˈbǒdan ˈtř̩kuʎa], Serbian: Слободан Тркуља; born 29 May 1977) is a Serbian multi-instrumentalist, composer and singer in traditional and Byzantium style. Trkulja is one of the first artists who composed, performed, and popularized Balkan Traditional Music with a modern approach in arrangements. He is the founder of the Modern Balkan Tradition music genre, although he is most famous for his collaboration with Metropole Orchestra from Netherlands in 2008. Aside from playing 13 instruments, Dutch daily NRC Handelsblad called him "one of the most beautiful male voices of the Balkan." He had no formal music training until 1997, but attended a public high school in Sremski Karlovci. Slobodan moved to Netherlands in 1997, and returned to Serbia in 2008, where he has been since. He represented Serbia at the Intervision 2025 with the song "Tri ružice" finishing in 14th place with 236 points.

== Biography ==
=== Early life ===
Trkulja was born in Odžaci on 29 May 1977. At the age of 10 he taught himself to play the clarinet. After clarinet, Slobodan learned to play dozen more instruments in the next eight years. At the age of 14, he started playing in the professional folk ensemble Kolo in Belgrade. In less than a year he was announced the best instrumentalist at the "Festival of Music Societies of Vojvodina". He spent the next four years focusing on his high school education and performing with Kolo. In 1998 Slobodan went to Amsterdam, where he studied at Conservatorium van Amsterdam, Saxophone Department, an instrument which he had played less than a year and a half at that point. In 1999, right before the NATO bombing of Serbia, he returned to his homeland and postponed his education until the end of the war. Trkulja continued with his studies in February 2000. In 2004 he graduated, and three years later he received his Master’s Degree of Arts with honors and an award for his MA concert.

=== Religious influences ===
Slobodan claims to have recognized the true gist of music upon entering his religion, when suddenly he experienced a revelation of different and unknown musical views and fields. The feedback that he got from religion was reciprocal, because he entered faith through music. “One day, I went to the Kovilj Monastery and experienced a great temblor inside my soul the moment I heard monks chanting. For me it was an out-of-body experience, an un-earthy feeling… something that shook me to that extent that I felt physical changes inside." Slobodan was threading deeper into the faith and realized that in great part Serbian traditional singing and traditional songs were immensely based on Byzantine chants. “Many melodies in old Serbian songs are almost exactly the same as Orthodox Christian music”, says Trkulja. "The predominant emotion in our tradition is an emotion weaved with spirituality, because our people couldn’t make music that was not close to their souls. What I personally as a musician like the most about these melodies is that they are infinite. They start and keep on going, they are endless as a prayer. At one moment it overwhelms you and you forget about yourself, about your ego, about your problems, about all the things that make you feel bad. It’s like you're bathing your soul in a pure, beautiful energy that nurtures you from inside."

== Music career ==
=== Balkanopolis ===
In 1997, in the clubs of Novi Sad, Trkulja started playing music that was inspired by Serbian music and Balkan tradition, but had strong modern influences from the west. Pursuing his dream further, he founded the group Balkanopolis, with whom he held many concerts and published an independent album titled Let Iznad Balkana (One Flew Over the Balkans). Western musicologists consider his sound a new genre that they call “Modern Balkan Tradition.” Ever since, under the Balkanopolis influence, many musical groups ensued and continued to weave the Modern Tradition into the Serbian music scene. This exposure brought him a lecturing invitation for the "International Ethno Camp" in Sweden. Slobodan was featured as an artistic leader, representing the Balkan countries in the "mix of world music" in Stockholm.

Today Trkulja plays 13 instruments in total. Clarinet since he was 10; bagpipes, diple, double, kaval, flute, acoustic guitar since he was 15; flute since age of 18 and tenor saxophone since 19. Today, besides all of these, he plays the drums, Armenian duduk, ocarina, alto and soprano saxophone. In addition to his talent for playing, Slobodan Trkulja also has impressive singing abilities, which he developed by listening to traditional Serbian throat-singers. The most respected Dutch daily NRC Handelsblad called him "one of the most beautiful male voices of the Balkan."

In 2005 he played at the neo-Balkan music concert “Večiti most” ("Eternal Bridge") at the exhibition Expo in Japan. He performed at Exit 2006th, completely alone on stage, in front of three thousand people. On North Sea Jazz Festival in 2002. - he participated with "Balkanopolis", and reached the finals, where he won the award "Best New Talent." On September 15, the same year, he participated in a charity concert of ethnic music "Kuća na putu” (“House on the road”) in Belgrade's Sava Center, with blessings of the Serbian Patriarch Pavle. In 2003 he was one of the main soloists in the prestigious project of Theo Hook and “Metropole Orchestra”, called “Mixed Nuts”. At the benefit concert “Dar za Hilandar” ("A gift for Hilandar") on 13 April 2004 in the Sava Center, Trkulja performed his song Lepe moje crne oči (Beautiful black eyes of mine). In December, same year – same place, with Belgrade Philharmonic Orchestra and “Balkanopolis”, Trkulja held a groundbreaking concert, conducted by Arjan Tien, called Prizivanje kiše (Invocation of rain) where he singlehandedly introduced Serbian traditional instruments to contemporary music. This concert was held on the occasion of the completion of the Dutch presidency of the European Union organized by the Netherlands Embassy in Belgrade.

Currently Balkanopolis consists of:

- Slobodan Trkulja - lead vocal, composer (bagpipes, kaval, frula, guitar, tambura, clarinet etc.)
- Arie den Boer - drums
- Leonid Pilipović - punk tambura
- Jurre Hogervorst - bass guitar
- Dragutin Jakovljević - rock guitar
- Miloš Jakovljević - kaval flute
- Marko Milatović - keyboards, programming, piano
- Goran Milošević - traditional vocals, traditional percussions
- with guest appearances of Byzantine chanter from Chilandar monastery on Mountain Athos Aleksandar Jovanović On 22 February 2008, they had a notable appearance on the 15th Celtic Connections festival in Scotland. With attendances reaching 120,000 and events taking place across 14 venues throughout Glasgow they had great feedback from this visit.

=== Metropole Orchestra ===
In 2008, April and May marked collaboration with Metropole orchestra. On April 17, in Hilversum, Netherlands, Balkanopolis and Metropole Orchestra started their collaboration by recording the program for the interval act of Eurovision. This session was conducted by Jules Buckley. The next day Balkanopolis and Metropole Orchestra had a rehearsal in MCO Studios on which Richard Evans, producer and musician in the Peter Gabriel Band that was due to record and produce new Balkanopolis album, talked with Slobodan about future sound of Balkanopolis.

=== Albums ===
On their debut album, "Prizivanje Kiše" ("Invocation of Rain", published in 2006 by PGP RTS), Trkulja build a fusion of modern jazz and original folklore. Album features several popular traditional folk song covers, a jazz standard, and six original compositions in which they combine traditional music, jazz, pop and ambiental music.

Second album "Kingdom of Balkanopolis" (published in 2010) was produced in four countries on two continents. Slobodan Trkulja worked on this album with his colleagues and friends for a couple of years. David Rhodes, John Giblin and Tony Levin were featured as guest musicians on 8 compositions. Producers of this album are world-renowned Richard Evans (UK) and Tchad Blake (USA). It was recorded in Peter Gabriel's Real World Studios in the UK. Metropole Orchestra recorded the orchestral sections in Netherlands. Album went through the final stage of post-production in Gateway mastering studio in USA. The sound engineer Adam Ayan said: "Sound that Trkulja creates is a unique combination of tradition and modern sound that has emerged as a real refreshment at a time when all the bands are more like each other."

=== Involvement in Jazz ===
Trkulja collaborated with numerous jazz bands and philharmonic orchestras. He joined the multinational groove-jazz band "Turqumstances,” in Amsterdam. On their common appearances, his solo sections had a special place as well as duets with clarinetist Oguz Buyukberber. After this, he easily made his way through the Latin jazz scene, traveling through Benelux with the Latino big band of Eddie Martinez from Colombia. At the Concertgebouw in Amsterdam, in a traditional New Year’s concert, January 2002, he performed his Pythagora Oro, together with Dutch Brass Ensemble. The performance at this concert (which was directly transmitted by the Dutch television) was the high point of Trkulja’s career, which gained him admiring reviews and earned him recognition in the Netherlands. On 6 February 2005 he won the Dutch Erasmus Prize for performing jazz saxophone and clarinet pieces for 45 minutes with drummer Arie Den Boer as his only accompaniment. Other than a sum of money from Rotterdam Conservatory, the prize included a number of concerts at the renowned jazz clubs in the Netherlands.

=== Concert for Babies ===
In 2011 Slobodan performed a concert he specially designed for babies and children. This concert was followed by a workshop in which the audience could musically interact and play the instruments with Slobodan. This concert took place in SKC Novi Beograd, Belgrade and, as part of the Pokreni Se (Move) project, it was done in collaboration with the students of the Belgrade Academy of Music and Center for Culture and Information Kissaro. This was one of 33 projects that were supported by Center for the Promotion of Science of Serbia.

Arena concert

Slobodan Trkulja organised a humanitarian concert "Balkanopolis & friends" in Belgrade Arena on 15 May 2015. Special guests were fado diva Mariza, soul singer/composer Oleta Adams, Lebanese young star Mayssa Karaa and renown singer from Senegal Baaba Maal. In front of the 10.000 people in the audience, Balkanopolis was the first neo-traditional group to perform their own concert in a venue of that scale, marking their 18th birthday.

== Summary ==
Trkulja’s music is described as contemporary art and intelligent synthesis of traditional Serbian music and modern jazz and fusion, asymmetric bars of Balkan rhythms and grooving beats of modern funk, which entail unprecedented examples of rhythmic fireworks. He does not hesitate to use exotic, almost delirious time signatures like 25/8. He employs vocal counterpoint parts in which he plays with different textures, which produce a powerful effect in his melancholic ballads. He claims that he is not narrowed by genre. Trkulja once said that for him music making is not subject to any kind of classification. On Beovizija 2007 Slobodan Trkulja and “Balkanopolis” competed with his composition ”Nebo” (“Sky”), which combines traditional and Byzantine ecclesiastical chant. They won second place with 10/12 points of TV audience votes and 7/12 points of votes of the jury as well as the prize for best interpretation assigned by the Eurovision Fan Club(OGAE Serbia). The song "Nebo" also was a representative for Serbia at the annual OGAE “Second chance” contest 2007 in Slovenia. The song finished 14th.

== Politics ==
In 2023, he signed a letter of support for the parliamenatary group Serbia Must Not Stop.
