= Yar, Yarsky Selsoviet, Yarsky District, Udmurt Republic =

Rural locality in Udmurtia, Russia

Coordinates: 58°14′37″N 52°06′27″E

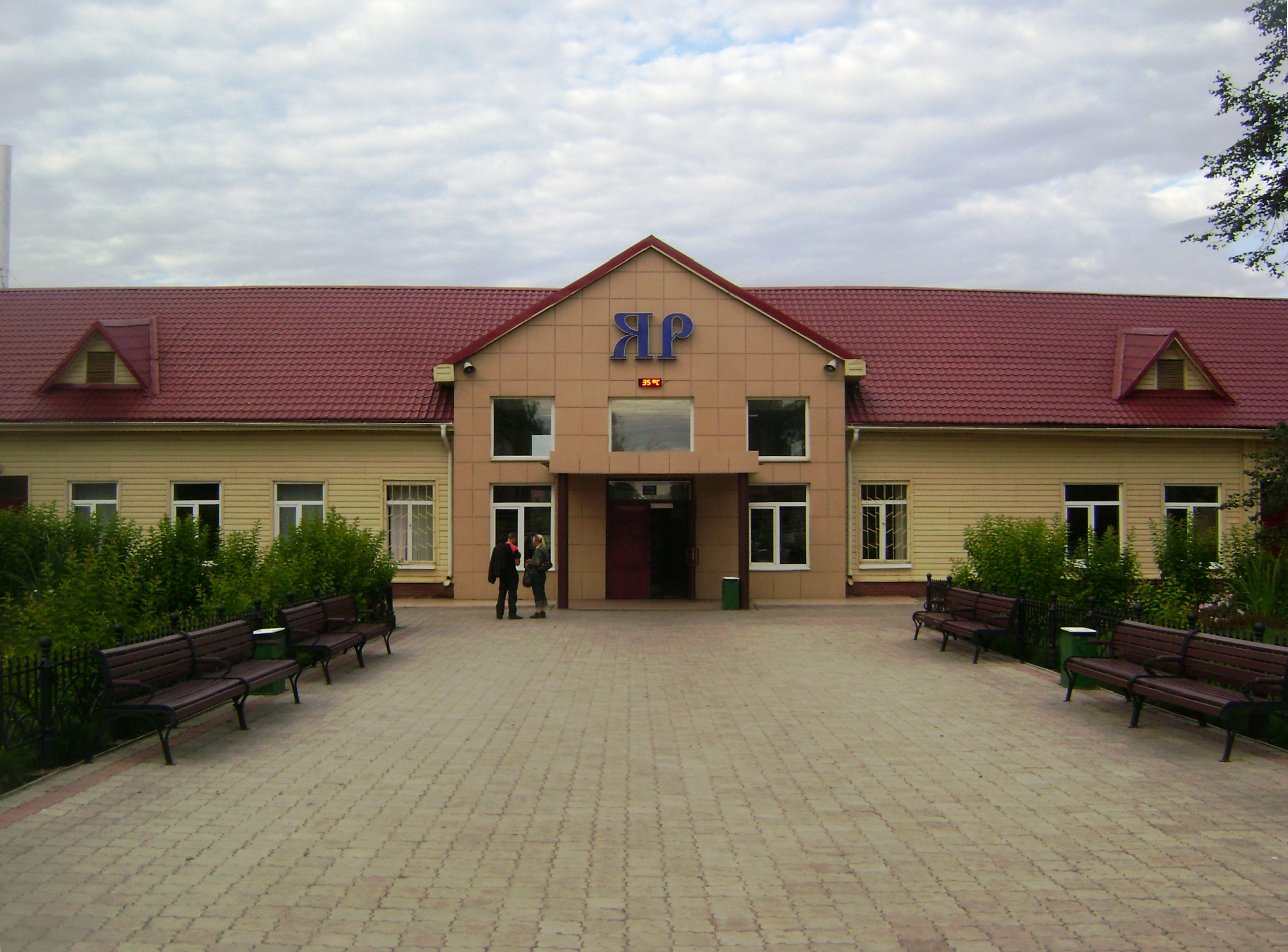
Yar Railway station

Yar (Russian: Яр, Udmurt: Яр, Jar) is a rural locality (a settlement) and the administrative center of Yarsky District, Udmurtia, Russia. Population: 6,596 (2010 census); 7,202 (2002 census); 6,917 (1989 Soviet census).
