= Safe Internet League =

Russian Internet censorship organization

The Safe Internet League (Russian: Лига безопасного интернета) is a state-sponsored nonprofit Russian Internet censorship organization.

It was registered on January 26, 2011 under the full name АССОЦИАЦИЯ УЧАСТНИКОВ РЫНКА ИНТЕРНЕТ-ИНДУСТРИИ "ЛИГА БЕЗОПАСНОГО ИНТЕРНЕТА". As of 2025, its director is Ekaterina Mizulina (recorded in this capacity on April 10, 2018). It was created with the support of the Russian Ministry of Internal Affairs, Ministry of Digital Development, Communications and Mass Media, and the State Duma Committee on Family, Women, and Children. Until 2015 the board of directors was headed by Russian media mogul Konstantin Malofeev in the capacity of managing partner of Marshall Capital Partners investment fund. On April 20, 2015 this position was taken by Denis Davydov, former executive director.

On January 29, 2024 the head of the organization Ekaterina Mizulina was sanctioned by the European Union for "enforcing censorship practices against Internet content creators and artists in favour of the Russian government and its policies" and saying that she is "responsible for serious and systematic abuses of freedom of opinion and expression". By the same decision organization itself was also sanctioned because it "allows the Russian government to reinforce censorship practices by silencing Internet content creators and artists, who make content not consistent with the official line of the Russian government"... "Using the threat of imposing punitive or economic measures, Safe Internet League is trying to make Internet content creators and artists either to delete anti-government content or to create content in favour of the Russian government and praising its policies."
