= Shaman (singer) =

Russian singer-songwriter (born 1991)

- Шаман
- Shaman in 2024
- Born: Yaroslav Yuryevich Dronov; 22 November 1991 (age 35); Novomoskovsk, Russian SFSR, Soviet Union
- Occupations: Singer; songwriter; record producer
- Years active: 2013–present
- Spouses: Marina Roshchupkina (m. 2012; div. 2016) Elena Martynova (m. 2017; div. 2024) Ekaterina Mizulina (m. 2025)
- Children: 1
- Musical career
- Genres: Pop; rock
- Instrument: Vocals
- Labels: Atlantic; ONErpm
- Website: shamanofficial.ru

Yaroslav Yuryevich Dronov (Russian: Ярослав Юрьевич Дронов; born 22 November 1991), better known by his stage name Shaman (stylized in all Latin caps), is a Russian singer-songwriter and music producer. He represented Russia at Intervision 2025.

He gained popularity in 2022 against the backdrop of Russia's invasion of Ukraine, performing the songs "Vstanem", "Ya russkiy" and other patriotic songs.

Shaman was voted the second-best Russian singer of 2022 in a poll conducted by the state-owned Russian Public Opinion Research Center (VTsIOM). He was awarded the honorary title of Merited Artist of the Russian Federation in 2024.

== Career ==
Yaroslav Yuryevich Dronov was born on 22 November 1991, in the city of Novomoskovsk within the Russian Soviet Federative Socialist Republic.

At the age of four, his parents enrolled him in the local children's vocal and pop group "Assorti". He graduated from a music school with a focus on "Folk Singing" and later completed his studies at the Novomoskovsk College of Music, specializing in "Head of Folk Choir". At the age of 15, he began performing at a local restaurant.

He performed on Faktor A (the Russian version of The X Factor) in 2013 and on the Russian version of The Voice in 2014.

Dronov adopted the stage name Shaman in 2020. The blonde-haired singer previously wore his hair in dreadlocks, which he described as a "Russian folk hairstyle, because they look like wheat stalks."

On 23 February 2022, Shaman released "Rise Up" (Russian: Встанем; romanized: Vstanem) for Defender of the Fatherland Day. The song, which honors soldiers who died, was also released on the eve of the Russian invasion of Ukraine. In an interview with Russia-1, he stated that he believed the song was "dictated to me from above." His single amassed 46 million views on YouTube and was featured on the Russian state channel Russia-1. The song was dedicated to Russian war heroes of the Great Patriotic War.

Later in 2022, he released "Ya Russkiy" (Russian: Я русский; English: I'm Russian). The song got more than 42 million views, though it was ridiculed on Russian social media. The music critic Pavel Rudchenko noted that "the song encourages pride in being Russian, in being a part of Russia," which explains the composition's popularity. Shaman was voted the second-best Russian singer of 2022 in a poll conducted by the state-owned Russian Public Opinion Research Center (VTsIOM).

Shaman expressed his support for the Russian invasion of Ukraine in December 2022 and was invited to speak and perform at Kremlin-organized events. In November 2022, he was criticized by the head of the Russian Media Group for not performing in Russian-occupied Ukraine. In January 2023, he performed for Russian soldiers in the occupied cities of Luhansk and Mariupol.

In July 2023, Shaman released a clip from his song "My Fight" (Russian: Мой бой, romanized: Moy boy); the clip received over a million views in its first 24 hours. While it was praised by Russian news outlets, it was criticized on Russian social media for its perceived references to Adolf Hitler's Mein Kampf.

In December 2023, Shaman was included in the list of proxies approved by the Central Election Commission to campaign for incumbent president Vladimir Putin in the 2024 Russian presidential election for his fifth term as president.

In July 2024, he was awarded the honorary title of Merited Artist of the Russian Federation, with Putin signing the corresponding decree, which recognized him "for his significant contribution to the development of Russian culture and art, and for his many years of fruitful work.".

In August 2024, Shaman visited Russian-occupied Ukraine, including Mariupol, Tokmak, and Enerhodar, where he performed for Russian soldiers; he also performed at the Zaporizhzhia Nuclear Power Plant, which had been seized by Russian forces. The same month, he also visited Kursk Oblast in Russia to perform for Russian soldiers following a Ukrainian incursion into the region.

In January 2025, Russian State Duma deputy Sergey Kolunov announced that Shaman and other pro-war singers, including Oleg Gazmanov and Denis Maidanov, would tour schools across the country from February to April, stating, "Our artists proposed the idea of holding patriotic music lessons". The tour was part of a State Duma initiative to draw up a list of patriotic songs to be taught in music classes beginning in September. In August, the Russian education ministry stated that one of Shaman's songs, "Moya Rossiya", would be included on a list of patriotic songs recommended for study in schools.

On 15 August 2025, Shaman performed in Pyongyang, North Korea, at a concert held to mark the 80th anniversary of Korea's liberation from Japanese rule towards the end of World War II. In October, Shaman performed at an event held in Pyongyang to mark the 80th anniversary of the founding of the Workers' Party of Korea, at which he released a new song praising North Korean leader Kim Jong Un.

In September 2025, Shaman represented Russia at Intervision 2025, revived by the Russian government as an alternative to the Eurovision Song Contest after Russia was banned from the contest. He performed the song "Pryamo po serdtsu" at the contest.

== Personal life ==
From 2012 to 2016, Dronov was married to singing teacher Marina Roshchupkina, whom he met in his native Novomoskovsk. They have a daughter who was born in 2014 and lives with her mother.

Dronov married Elena Martynova, who is 14 years older than him, in 2017. Since 2012, Martynova has worked in the PR department of USM Holdings Alisher Usmanov, and since 2018, she has held the position of Deputy General Director for Strategic Communications and Brand Promotion of the company MegaFon. Shortly before her wedding with Dronov, Martynova divorced her first husband Aleksandr Tsypkin and planned to move to Los Angeles, but before leaving, she "met her love". Martynova was described as being responsible for Dronov's stage image, though he has denied this; she also accompanied him to work meetings at media holdings and on the radio. On 26 September 2024, Dronov announced his divorce from Martynova.

On 9 March 2025, Dronov announced during a speech that he was in a relationship with Ekaterina Mizulina, director of the Safe Internet League (a state-sponsored Russian Internet censorship organisation). On 5 November, they married in a ceremony held in Donetsk.

=== Sanctions ===
On 17 March 2023, the Latvian foreign ministry imposed sanctions on him, banning him from entering the country, along with other Russian artists and cultural figures who supported the 2022 Russian invasion of Ukraine. On 20 July, Dronov was added to Canada's sanctions list.

On 24 June 2024, Dronov was sanctioned by the European Union for participating in Kremlin-organized concerts, including those in the Russian-occupied regions of southeastern Ukraine. Following this, his YouTube channel and Spotify artist page were deleted. In response to the YouTube suspension of his channel, Shaman staged a protest concert near the U.S. embassy in Moscow in July 2024. Kremlin press secretary Dmitry Peskov praised the protest.

== Discography ==
List of studio albums, with selected details
Title	Details
Sdelano v Rossii	Released: 9 September 2023; Label: Self-published; Format: CD, Digital download, streaming

=== Singles ===
==== As lead artist: 2020–2023 ====
List of singles released from 2020 to 2023 as lead artist, showing year released, chart positions and album name
Title	Year	Peak chart positions		Album
Title	Year	RUS Air.	CIS Air.	Album
"Devochka-Vesna"	2020	—	—	Non-album singles
"Luna"	2020	—	—	Non-album singles
"Lyod"	2020	—	—	Non-album singles
"Yesli tebya net"	2020	—	—	Non-album singles
"Vspominay menya"	2020	—	—	Non-album singles
"V nevesomosti"	2020	—	—	Non-album singles
"Samaya"	2021	—	—	Non-album singles
"Rodnaya"	2021	—	—	Non-album singles
"Ogon'"	2021	—	—	Non-album singles
"Molodost'"	2021	—	—	Non-album singles
"Tayali"	2021	—	—	Non-album singles
"Uletay"	2021	—	—	Sdelano v Rossii
"Mokryy dozhd'"	2021	—	—	Non-album single
"Teryayem my lyubov'"	2022	—	—	Sdelano v Rossii
"Vstanem"	2022	—	—	Sdelano v Rossii
"Ty moya"	2022	—	—	Sdelano v Rossii
"Do samogo neba"	2022	—	—	Sdelano v Rossii
"Ya russkiy"	2022	—	—	Sdelano v Rossii
"Vorony moi"	2022	—	—	Non-album single
"Gimn Rossii" (Cover of the national anthem of Russia)	2022	—	—	Sdelano v Rossii
"Ispoved'"	2023	—	—	Sdelano v Rossii
"Moya Rossiya"	2023	98	—	Sdelano v Rossii
"Samyy russkiy khit"	2023	63	97	Sdelano v Rossii
"My"	2023	—	—	Sdelano v Rossii
"Myod"	2023	—	—	Sdelano v Rossii
"Moy boy"	2023	62	91	Sdelano v Rossii
"—" denotes items which were not released in that country or failed to chart.

==== As lead artist: 2024–2025 ====
List of singles released from 2024 to 2025 as lead artist, showing year released, chart positions and album name
Title	Year	Peak chart positions		Album
Title	Year	RUS Air.	CIS Air.	Album
"Zhivoy"	2024	82	—	Non-album singles
"Mama"	2024	—	—	Non-album singles
"Rekviyem 22.03.24"	2024	—	—	Non-album singles
"Chernyy voron"	2024	—	—	Non-album singles
"Lyubimaya zhenshchina"	2024	—	—	Non-album singles
"Dusha naraspashku"	2024	—	—	Non-album singles
"Ya ostanus' s toboy"	2024	—	—	Non-album singles
"Nebo slavyan"	2025	—	—	Non-album singles
"Byvshiye"	2025	69	—	Non-album singles
"Minuta molchaniya" (with Nikolay Rastorguyev and Alexander Vainberg)	2025	—	—	Non-album singles
"Pervaya lyubov"	2025	—	—	Non-album singles
"Drug" (with Nikita Osin)	2025	—	—	Non-album singles
"Pryamo po serdtsu"	2025	74	156	Non-album singles
"Gulyay, Rossiya!"	2025	—	—	Non-album singles
"Ona togo stoit"	2025	—	—	Non-album singles
"Ona ne skazhet Da" (with Grigory Leps)	2025	—	—	Non-album singles
"Belyy veter"	2025	—	—	Non-album singles
"Ya krasivo zhivu" (with Igor Butman)	2025	—	—	Non-album singles
"Metelitsa"	2025	—	—	Non-album singles
"—" denotes items which were not released in that country or failed to chart.

==== As lead artist: since 2026 ====
List of singles released since 2026 as lead artist, showing year released, chart positions and album name
Title	Year	Peak chart positions	Album
Title	Year	RUS Air.	Album
"Za tekh"	2026	—	Non-album singles
"Ne dushi moyu dushu"	2026	—	Non-album singles
"Rossiya – Mama"	2026	—	Non-album singles
"Brat'ya slavyane"	2026	—	Non-album singles
"Bozhe, pomogi"	2026	—	Non-album singles
"Proshchay, moya lyubov'"	2026	—	Non-album singles
"Ya russkiy muzhik"	2026	83	Non-album singles
"—" denotes items which were not released in that country or failed to chart.

=== Promotional singles ===
List of promotional singles, showing year released and album name
Title	Year	Album
"Vyzov"	2022	Vyzov (soundtrack)
"Spasibo"	2023	Sdelano v Rossii
"Serdtse plachet i bolit"	2023	Sdelano v Rossii
"Rodnaya" (Another version of the single from 2021)	2023	Sdelano v Rossii
"Za toboy"	2023	Sdelano v Rossii
"Day zharu"	2023	Sdelano v Rossii
"Da"	2023	Sdelano v Rossii
"Greshnaya lyubov'"	2023	Sdelano v Rossii
"Rossiya – serdtse Zemli" (with Nikolay Baskov, Julia Gavrilova, Anna Volkova, Matvey Yaitsky and Alexander Egromzhan)	2026	Non-album single
