= Novoivanovskoye =

Novoivanovskoye Новоивановское
- Urban-type settlement
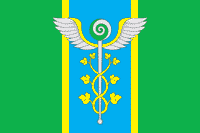
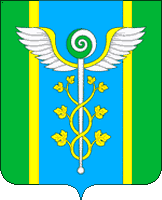
- Flag Coat of arms
- Interactive map of Novoivanovskoye
- Location of Novoivanovskoye Novoivanovskoye (Moscow Oblast)
- Coordinates: 55.7053°N 37.3663°E
- Country: Russia
- Federal subject: Moscow Oblast
- Administrative district: Odintsovsky District

Population (2010 Census)
  - Total: 6,003
  - Estimate (2025): 13,705 (+128.3%)
- Time zone: UTC+3 (MSK)
- Postal code: 143025
- OKTMO ID: 46641162051

Novoivanovskoye (Russian: Новоивановское) is an urban locality (an urban-type settlement) in Odintsovsky District of Moscow Oblast, Russia. Population: 6,003 (2010 census);
