= Homay (song) =

Single by Ay Yola

from the album Ural batyr
- Language: Bashkir
- Released: March 14, 2025
- Genre: folktronica; indie; electronic; alt-rock
- Length: 4:04
- Label: MTS Label
- Songwriters: Ruslan Shayhitdinov; Diana Kildina
- Producer: Ruslan Sever

Ay Yola singles chronology
"Batyr" (2025)	"Homay" (2025)	"Tugan Tel" (2025)

"Homay" (ho-MY, Bashkir: Һомай, lit. 'Huma') is a song by the Russian folk-pop trio Ay Yola. The Bashkir-language song was released on March 14, 2025.

The song combines ancient folklore and electronic music, and has gone viral internationally, particularly in Turkic-speaking countries, where it was among the top-charting tracks on TikTok and Shazam.

The song speaks about the Huma bird, a mythological character in the legend of Ural-batyr. She is the daughter of Samrau, the ruler of birds and the Sun. Huma is depicted as a keeper of sacred knowledge and the symbol of wisdom and light. The song creates a parallel between Huma and modern Bashkir women, outlining cultural succession and identity.

== Charts ==
=== Weekly charts ===
Weekly chart performance for "Homay"
Chart (2025–2026)	Peak position
Belarus Airplay (TopHit)	25
CIS Airplay (TopHit)	5
Estonia Airplay (TopHit)	186
Kazakhstan Airplay (TopHit)	1
Latvia Airplay (TopHit)	4
Lithuania Airplay (TopHit)	15
Moldova Airplay (TopHit)	4
Russia Airplay (TopHit)	1
Russia Streaming (TopHit)	1

Weekly chart performance for "Homay" (version with Dima Bilan)
Chart (2025–2026)	Peak position
Latvia Airplay (TopHit)	41
Moldova Airplay (TopHit)	49
Russia Streaming (TopHit)	87

=== Monthly charts ===
Monthly chart performance for "Homay"
Chart (2025–2026)	Peak position
Belarus Airplay (TopHit)	31
CIS Airplay (TopHit)	6
Kazakhstan Airplay (TopHit)	4
Latvia Airplay (TopHit)	32
Moldova Airplay (TopHit)	7
Russia Airplay (TopHit)	1
Russia Streaming (TopHit)	1

Monthly chart performance for "Homay" (version with Dima Bilan)
Chart (2026)	Peak position
Latvia Airplay (TopHit)	52

=== Year-end charts ===
Year-end chart performance for "Homay"
Chart (2025)	Position
Belarus Airplay (TopHit)	89
CIS Airplay (TopHit)	24
Kazakhstan Airplay (TopHit)	58
Moldova Airplay (TopHit)	35
Russia Airplay (TopHit)	9
Russia Streaming (TopHit)	4

=== Decade-end charts ===
20s Decade-end chart performance
Chart (2025–2026)	Position
Russia Streaming (TopHit)	3
