= Tashkent-Humo Airport =

Airport in Tashkent, Uzbekistan

Tashkent-Humo Airport Tashkent-Humo
- IATA: TVT; ICAO: UTTP

Summary
- Airport type: public
- Location: Tashkent
- Opened: August 27, 2025; 14 months ago
- Coordinates: 41°18′42″N 69°23′30″E
- Interactive map of Tashkent-Humo Airport

Tashkent-Humo Airport (previously known as Tashkent-Eastern) is an international commercial aviation airport in the Yashnobod district of Tashkent, Uzbekistan.

== History ==
During the Soviet period and into the 2010s, the airfield was used as a test runway for locally built Ilyushin Il-76 cargo aircraft.

In 2018, the Tashkent-Vostochny airfield and part of the territory of the Tashkent Mechanical Plant (former TAPOiCh) were transferred to JSC "Uzbek Railways." That same year, a construction of a civil aerospace complex began.

In 2025, intensive construction of the airport was completed. The airport occupies 561 hectares. In September of 2025, the airport welcomed its first technical flight, An Uzbek Government Boeing 767

In November 2025, the airport was named "Tashkent-Humo" in honor of the Huma bird, a symbol of happiness and good luck.
