= Huma bird =

Mythical bird of Iranian mythology

Huma
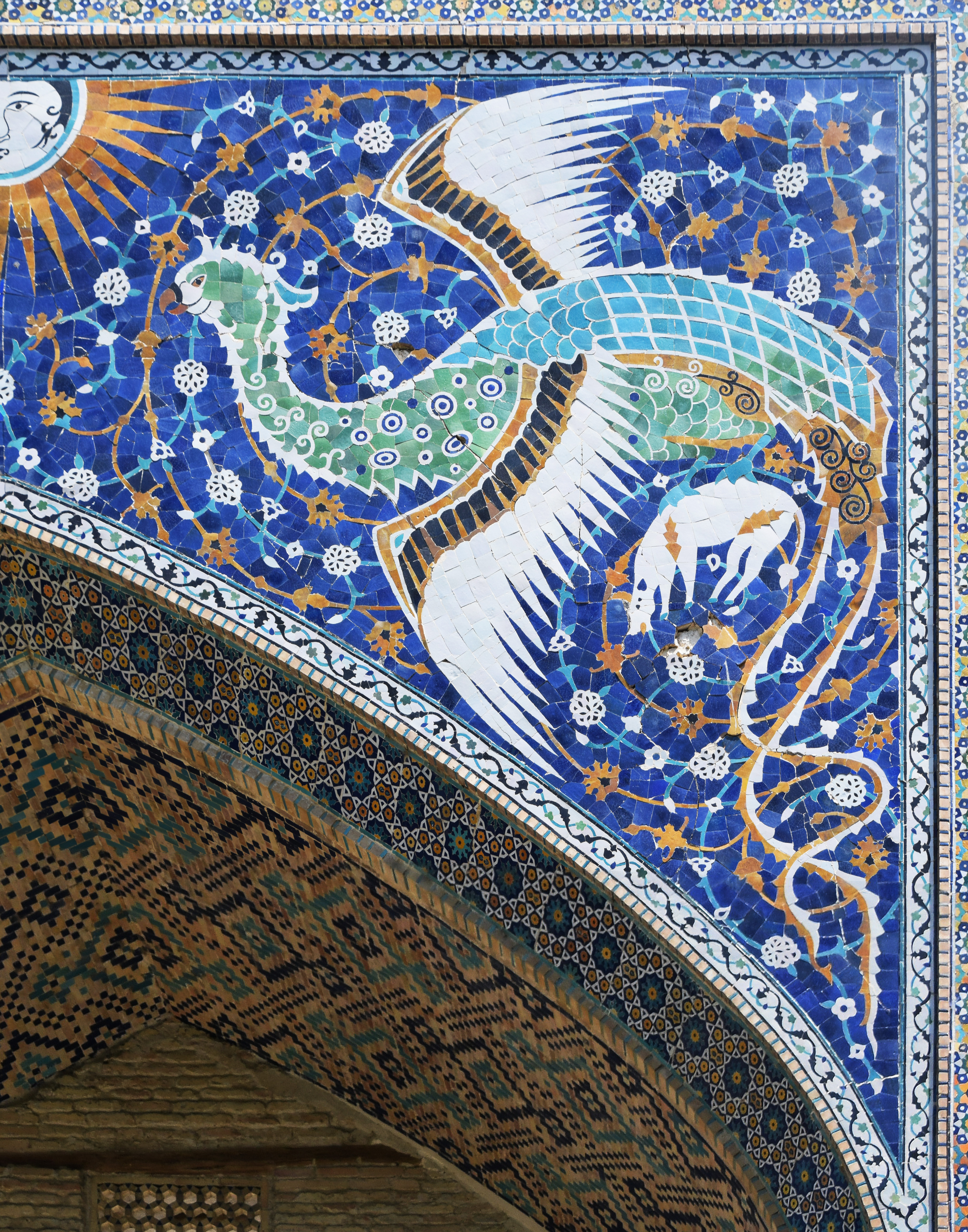
- Mosaic of the mythical Huma bird on the portal of Nadir Divan-Begi Madrasa in Bukhara, Uzbekistan

Creature information
- Grouping: Mythical creature
- Folklore: Persian mythology

Origin
- Country: Ancient Iran

The Huma (Persian: هما, Homâ, Avestan: Homāio), also Homāy or Humo, is a mythical bird of Iranian legends and fables, and continuing as a common motif in Sufi and Diwan poetry. Although there are many legends of the creature, common to all is that the bird is said never to alight on the ground, and instead to live its entire life flying invisibly high above the earth.

== Myths and legends ==
The Huma bird is said to never come to rest, living its entire life flying invisibly high above the earth, and never alighting on the ground (in some legends it is said to have no legs).

In several variations of the Huma myths, the bird is said to be phoenix-like, consuming itself in fire every few hundred years, only to rise anew from the ashes. The Huma bird is said to have both the male and female natures in one body (reminiscent of the Chinese Fenghuang), each nature having one wing and one leg. Huma is considered to be compassionate, and a 'bird of fortune' since its shadow (or touch) is said to be auspicious.

In Sufi tradition, catching the Huma is beyond even the wildest imagination, but catching a glimpse of it or even a shadow of it is sure to make one happy for the rest of one's life. It is also believed that Huma cannot be caught alive, and the person killing a Huma will die in forty days.

In Ottoman poetry, the creature is often referred to as a 'bird of paradise'; early European descriptions of the Paradisaeidae species portrayed the birds as having no wings or legs, and the birds were assumed to stay aloft their entire lives.

In Attar of Nishapur's allegorical masterpiece The Conference of the Birds, an eminent example of Sufi works in Persian literature, the Huma bird is portrayed as a pupil that refuses to undertake a journey because such an undertaking would compromise the privilege of bestowing kingship on those whom it flew over. In Iranian literature, this kingship-bestowing function of the Huma bird is identified with pre-Islamic monarchs, and stands vis-à-vis ravens, which is a metaphor for Arabs. The legend appears in non-Sufi art as well.

The kingship-bestowing function of the Huma bird reappear in Indian stories of the Mughal Empire era, in which the shadow (or the alighting) of the Huma bird on a person's head or shoulder were said to bestow (or foretell) kingship. Accordingly, the feathers decorating the turbans of kings were said to be plumage of the Huma bird.

Sufi teacher Inayat Khan gives the bestowed-kingship legend a spiritual dimension: "Its true meaning is that when a person's thoughts so evolve that they break all limitation, then he becomes as a king. It is the limitation of language that it can only describe the Most High as something like a king."

The Huma bird symbolizes unreachable highness in Turkish folk literature. Some references to the creature also appear in Sindhi literature, where – as in the diwan tradition – the creature is portrayed as bringing great fortune. In the Zafarnama of Guru Gobind Singh, a letter addressed to Mughal Emperor Aurangzeb refers to the Huma bird as a "mighty and auspicious bird".

== Legacy ==
- Iran Air's logo depicts the homa bird.
- A British Museum catalog captions a photograph of the griffin-like capitals at Persepolis with "Column capital in the form of griffins (locally known as 'homa birds')".
- Huma bird in the Emblem of Uzbekistan
  The emblems of Uzbekistan and its autonomous republic Karakalpakstan both feature the Huma bird.
- Tashkent-Humo Airport is named after the Humo bird.
- Herman Melville briefly alludes to the bird in Moby-Dick. At the beginning of the chapter entitled "The Tail", the narrator speaks of "the bird that never alights."
- It provides the title of Bird's Shadow, a collection of short stories by Ivan Bunin.
- It is also referred to in the movie Days of Being Wild by Wong Kar-wai and the play "Orpheus Descending" by Tennessee Williams.
- The literature series Dragonlance named Krynn's greatest hero, Huma Dragonbane, after the Huma bird.
- the asteroid 3988 Huma discovered by Eleanor F. Helin named after the Huma bird. The asteroid's name was suggested by the SGAC Name An Asteroid Campaign.
- It is said that those named Huma possess the most beautiful voice.
- The 2025 song Homay by Ay Yola is dedicated to the Bashkir rendition of the Huma bird.

== Nomenclature ==
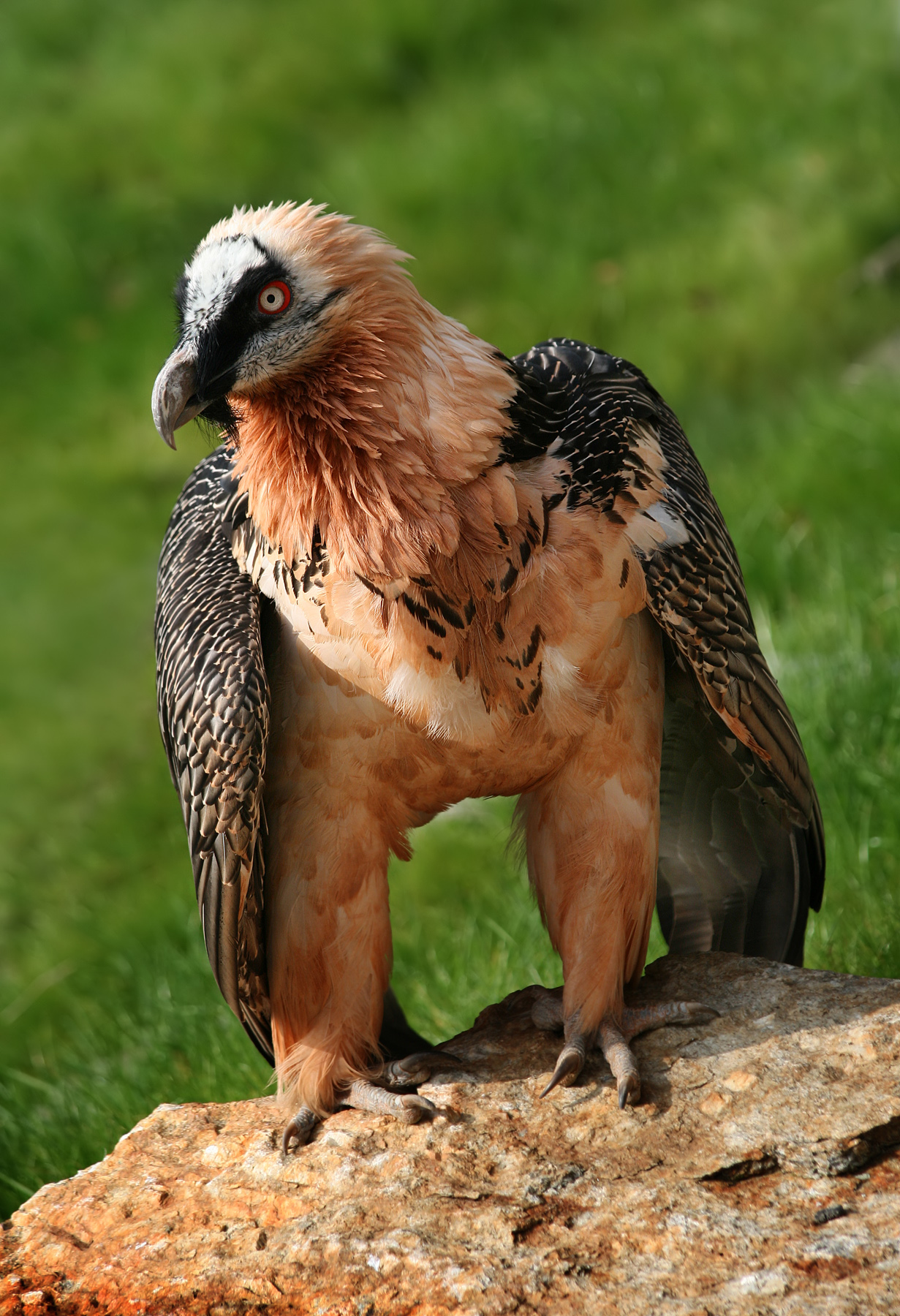
The bearded vulture is a very large bird of prey. It is morphologically similar to depictions of the Huma bird.

Although the Huma is a mythical bird, it is attributed to an existing bird of prey, the bearded vulture (Gypaetus barbatus). The species therefore has a sacred connection to mythology, and is revered by many people.

In general, Iranian and Zoroastrian traditions consider vultures as beneficial creatures due to their ability to efficiently and cleanly scavenge corpses and carrion, thereby preventing contamination of the soil and water.

== See also ==
- Chamrosh
- Garuda
- Griffin
- Fenghuang
- List of phoenixes in popular culture
- Martlet
- Shahbaz (bird)
- Simurgh
- Triple-headed eagle
- Turul
