= Shulgan =

Figure in Bashkir and Turkic mythology

Shulgan or Shulgen (Bashkir: Шүлгән, Turkish: Şölgen) is the king of Waterlands in Bashkort and Turkic mythologies.

The beginning of the legend "Ural Batyr" tells about two boys born on an island, surrounded by the ocean. A woman (Yanbike) and man (Yanbirde) have two boys named Ural and Shulgan. Ural is a good boy and obedient to his parents. Shulgan does not follow his parents' rules and traditions.

Once when their parents are gone hunting, Shulgen challenges Ural to drink the blood of animal at home that was left by their parents. Ural refuses to do it. Shulgan then drinks the blood himself. The couple curse their son Shulgan and reject him. Shulgan, however, is the name of the first king of the Sumerian country.

Today Shulgan-Tash Cave is located in the country of Bashkiriya. In Bashkortstan the cult of Shulgan-Tash has survived to the present, reflected in many ancient eposes of the Southern Urals.

== See also ==
- Ural Batyr
