= Ay Yola =

Russian musical group

- Origin: Ufa, Russia
- Genre: Folk-pop
- Years active: 2024–present
- Label: MTS
- Members: Ruslan Shayhitdinov; Adel Shayhitdinova; Rinat Ramazanov

Ay Yola (Bashkir: Ай Йола) is a Russian Bashkir-language folk-pop musical group, which was formed in Ufa in 2024.

Ay Yola is most famous through its 2025 debut single "Homay", which went viral internationally, notably in the Turkic states: Kazakhstan, Turkey, Uzbekistan, Kyrgyzstan, and Turkmenistan. Additionally, the song topped the airplay and streaming charts in Russia and got into top 10 of airplay charts in Commonwealth of Independent States, Kazakhstan, Latvia, and Moldova.

== Name ==
The name of the group is Bashkir in origin. Connecting the group name to the Ural-batyr legend, member Rinat Ramazanov explains its meaning to be "universal laws, charter", "set of rules of the universe": don't kill, don't steal, respect your elders, protect your juniors.

== Members ==
The group has three members:

- Adel Shayhitdinova. A vocalist, songwriter, guitarist, and dombra player. She was born in Ufa and is the daughter of Russian mother and Bashkir father Ruslan Shayhitdinov and Honored Artist of the Republic of Bashkortostan.
- Ruslan Shayhitdinov. A keyboard, bass guitar and kobyz player, Shayhitdinov is a musician, sound engineer, and producer. Named Honored Artist of the Republic of Bashkortostan, he is also known as DJ Ruslan Sever.
- Rinat Ramazanov. The vocalist and the quray player of the group, Ramazanov is a musician, public figure and Honored Artist of the Republic of Bashkortostan. Additionally being the soloist and leader of the folk-group "Argymak", he was Chairman of the All-Russian Kurultai of the Bashkir Youth from 2016 to 2025. His social media account included a repost raising funds for the Russian Army and a post of Ramazanov sending his brother off to the "special military operation". Ramazanov is noted as previously being an active member of pro-government organizations, including as Chairman of the All-Russian Kurultai of the Bashkir Youth.

== History ==
The Ay Yola group was founded from representatives of two other musical groups. Ruslan and Adel Shayhitdinovs began their creative work in the Musume project in 2010, and Rinat Ramazanov is the lead singer and leader of the "Argymak" ethno group. Ruslan Shayhitdinov and Rinat Ramazanov met in 2024 while writing the song "My Ufa", dedicated to the 450th anniversary of the founding of Ufa. Acquaintance and joint work inspired the musicians to create a new project, in which modern sound is combined with ethnic motives and the epic of Ural-batyr. Thus, within 10 months, a music album of the same name with the Bashkir epic was created. The second track Homay was especially viral in Kazakhstan, Uzbekistan, Azerbaijan, Turkmenistan and Russia.

On 3 August 2025, it was announced that the band had become one of the official ambassadors of Intervision 2025.

== Style ==
The band's musical style is characterized by a monotonous rhythm reminiscent of the clatter of hooves and the use of repetitive musical phrases. A special atmosphere is created by a deep, monotonous bass. The song Homay additionally includes throat singing.

While the single Homay was met with a lot of praise, some Bashkir listeners criticized its pronunciation of the Bashkir-language words, and encouraged the lead singer to "take a few lessons to improve her pronunciation". Shaykhitdinova replied that she is not bothered by the comments, stating: "I'm half Bashkir and half Russian. There are no native speakers in our family. But that doesn't stop me from being interested in the culture and singing in the native language".

== Discography ==
=== Albums ===
- Ural batyr (2025)

=== Singles ===
List of singles as lead artist, showing year released, chart positions and album name
Title	Year	Peak chart positions									Album
Title	Year	RUS Air.	RUS Stream.	BLR Air.	CIS Air.	EST Air.	KAZ Air.	LAT Air.	LTU Air.	MDA Air.	Album
"Homay"	2025	1	1	25	5	186	1	4	15	4	Ural batyr
"Tugan Tel"	2025	—	—	—	—	—	—	—	—	—	Ural batyr
"Batyr"	2025	—	—	—	—	—	—	—	—	—	Ural batyr
"Yola"	2025	—	96	—	—	—	—	—	—	—	Ural batyr
"Homay" (version with Dima Bilan)	2025	—	87	—	—	—	—	41	—	49	Non-album single
"Ural vasyaty"	2025	—	—	—	—	—	—	—	—	—	Ural batyr
"Ugez"	2025	—	—	—	—	—	—	—	—	—	Ural batyr
"Chornaya luna"	2025	55	97	—	86	—	—	—	—	—	August (soundtrack)
"Ay, bylbylym" (with Alsou)	2025	—	—	—	—	—	—	—	—	—	Non-album singles
"Ay, bylbylym" (solo version)	2026	—	—	—	—	—	—	—	—	—	Non-album singles
"Aihylyu"	2026	—	—	—	—	—	—	—	—	—	Non-album singles
"Amanat"	2026	—	—	—	—	—	—	—	—	—	Non-album singles
"—" denotes items which were not released in that country or failed to chart.

== Awards and nominations ==
=== Berlin Music Video Awards ===
The Berlin Music Video Awards is an international festival that promotes the art of music videos.

Year	Nominated work	Award	Result	Ref.
2026	"Homay"	Best Song	Nominated	
