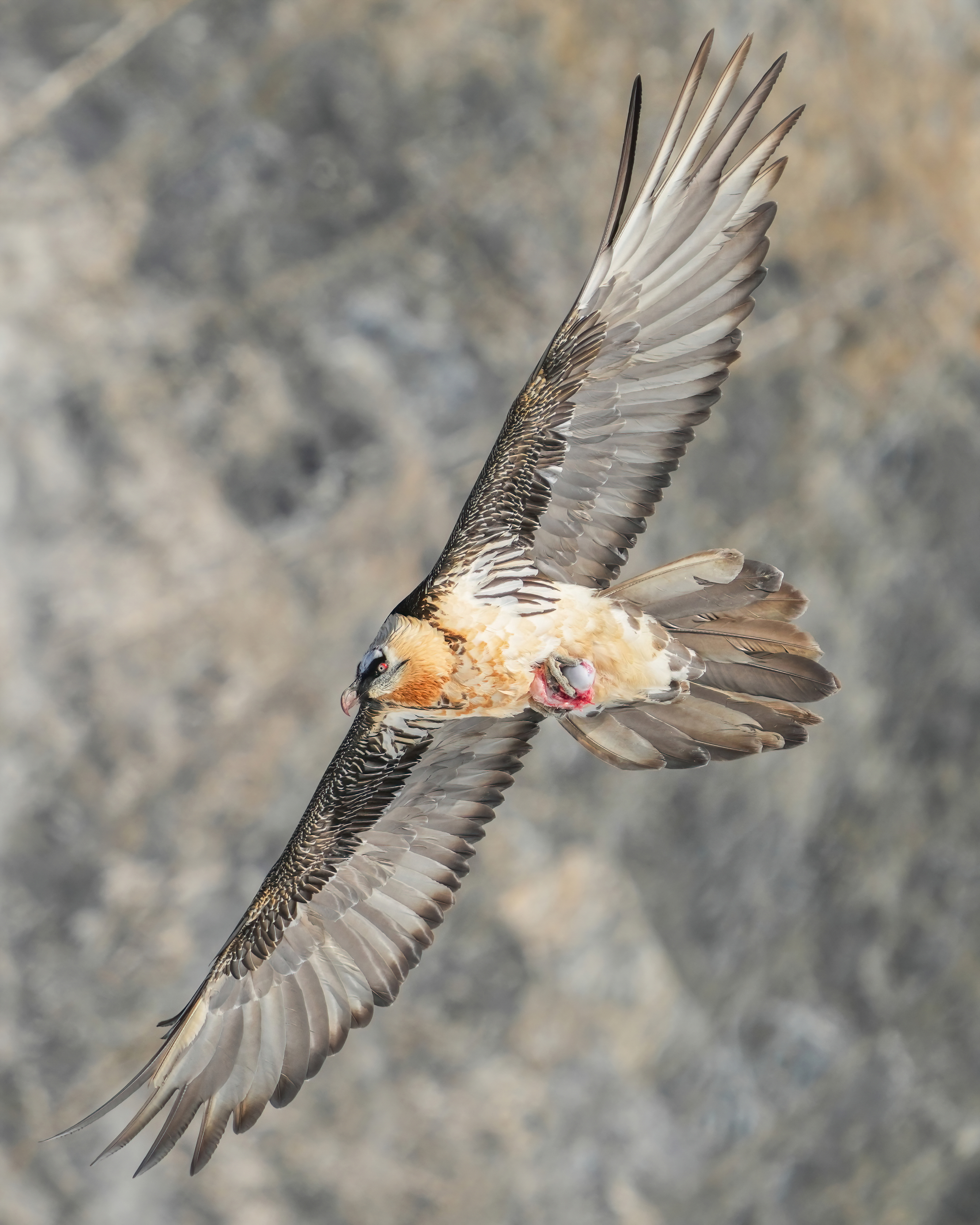
- G. b. barbatus in Switzerland

Conservation status
- Near Threatened (IUCN 3.1)

Scientific classification
- Kingdom: Animalia
- Phylum: Chordata
- Class: Aves
- Order: Accipitriformes
- Family: Accipitridae
- Subfamily: Gypaetinae
- Genus: Gypaetus; Storr, 1784
- Species: G. barbatus

Binomial name
- Gypaetus barbatus (Linnaeus, 1758)

Subspecies
- G. b. barbatus (Linnaeus, 1758); G. b. meridionalis Keyserling & J. H. Blasius, 1840
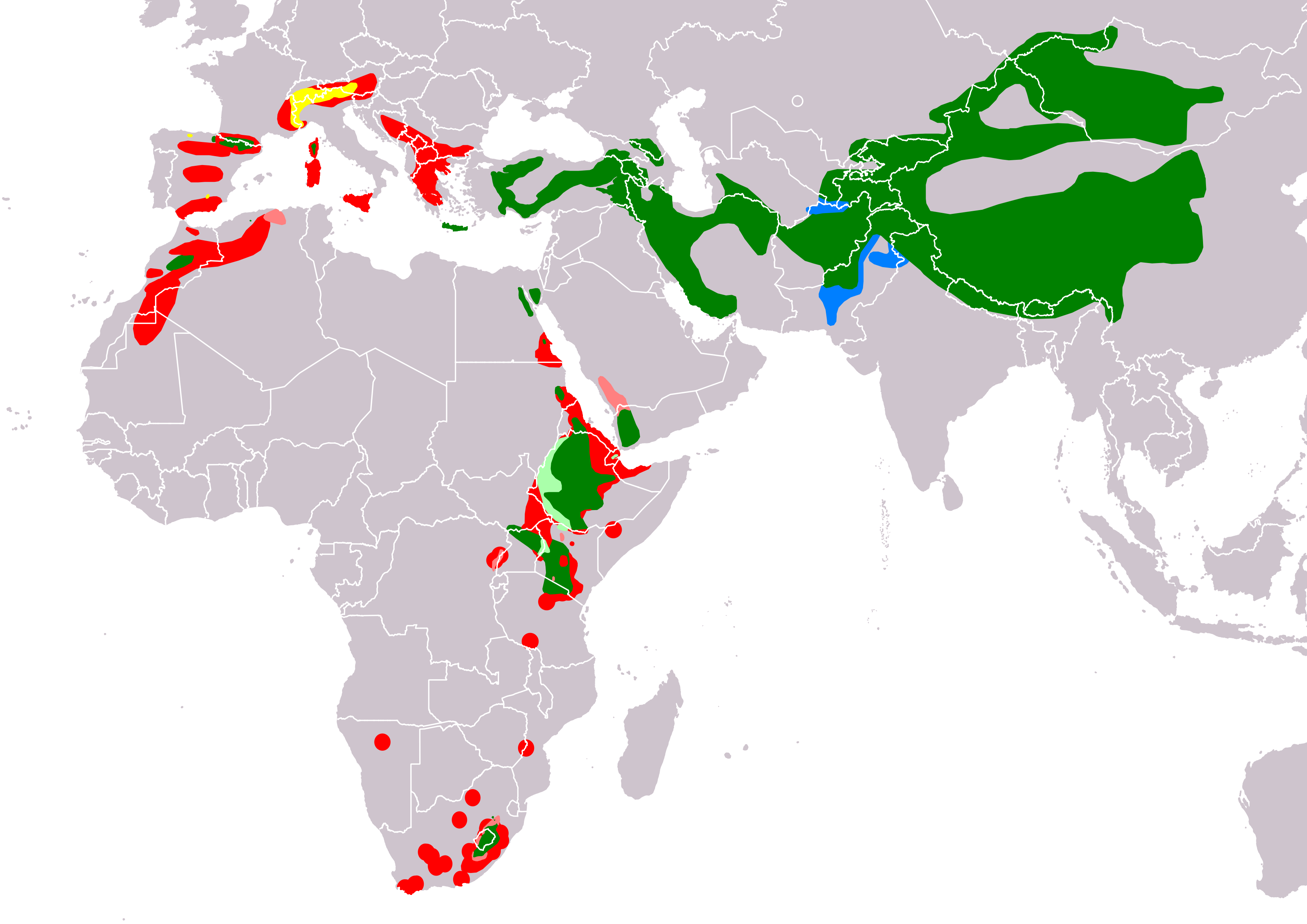
- Distribution of Gypaetus barbatus Resident Non-breeding Probably extinct Extinct Possibly extant (resident) Extant & reintroduced (resident)

Synonyms
- Vultur barbatus Linnaeus, 1758

= Bearded vulture =

Species of bird

The bearded vulture (Gypaetus barbatus), also known as the lammergeier and ossifrage, is a very large bird of prey in the monotypic genus Gypaetus. The bearded vulture is the only known vertebrate whose diet consists of 70–90% bone.

Traditionally considered an Old World vulture, it actually forms a separate minor lineage of Accipitridae together with the Egyptian vulture (Neophron percnopterus), its closest living relative. It is not much more closely related to the Old World vultures proper than to, for example, hawks, and differs from the former by its feathered neck. Although dissimilar, the Egyptian and bearded vulture each have a lozenge-shaped tail—unusual among birds of prey. It is vernacularly known as Homa, a bird in Iranian mythology.

The bearded vulture population is thought to be in decline; in 2004, it was classified on the IUCN Red List as least concern but has been listed as near threatened since 2014. It lives and breeds on crags in high mountains in Iran, southern Europe, East Africa, the Indian subcontinent, Tibet, and the Caucasus. Females lay one or two eggs in mid-winter that hatch at the beginning of spring.

== Etymology ==
The genus name Gypaetus is from Ancient Greek gupaietos, a corrupt form of hupaietos meaning "eagle" or "vulture". The specific epithet barbatus is Latin meaning "bearded" from barba, "beard". The name "lammergeier" originates from the German word Lämmergeier, which means "lamb-vulture". The name stems from the belief that it attacks lambs. The common name "ossifrage" is derived from the Latin word ossifragus, which literally means "bone-breaking," referring to the bird's diet consisting largely of bone. Ossifragus is also the root word for the osprey, which is within the same order, Accipitriformes, as vultures.

== Taxonomy ==
The bearded vulture was formally described in 1758 by Carl Linnaeus in the tenth edition of his Systema Naturae. He placed it with the vultures and condors in the genus Vultur and coined the binomial name Vultur barbatus. Linnaeus based his account on the "bearded vulture" that had been described and illustrated in 1750 by George Edwards who had based his hand-coloured etching on a specimen that had been collected at Santa Cruz near the town of Oran in Algeria. Linnaeus specified the type locality as Africa, but in 1914 this was restricted to Santa Cruz by Ernst Hartert.

The bearded vulture is the only species in the genus Gypaetus that was introduced in 1784 by Gottlieb Storr.

=== Subspecies ===
Two subspecies are recognised:

Image	Subspecies	Notes
	G. b. barbatus (Carl Linnaeus, 1758)	Includes G. b. hemachalanus and G. b. aureus in southern Europe and northwest Africa to northeast China through the Himalayas to Nepal and west Pakistan
	G. b. meridionalis Keyserling & Johann Heinrich Blasius, 1840	In southwestern Arabia and northeastern, eastern and southern Africa

Compared to the nominate subspecies, G. b. meridionalis lacks the black ear tuft and black chin bristles, has less heavily feathered tarsi, has overall plumage that is not as thick, and are smaller in size.

Historically, the species has had up to 5 subspecies. Only two are still considered valid.

== Description ==
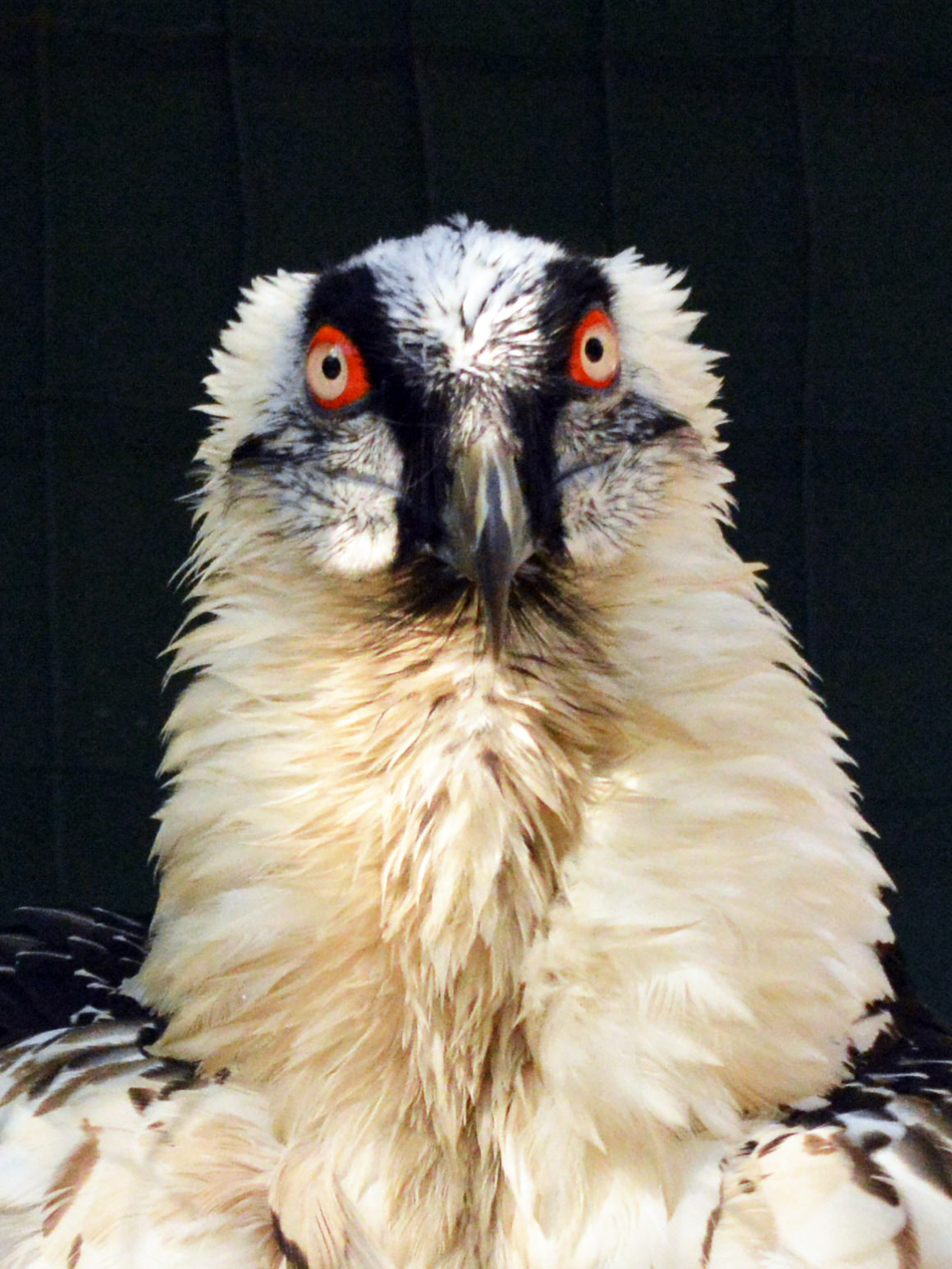
Front view of head, at the Mykolaiv Zoo in Ukraine

The bearded vulture is 94–125 cm (37–49 in) long with a wingspan of 2.31–2.83 m (7 ft 7 in – 9 ft 3 in). It weighs 4.5–7.8 kg (9.9–17.2 lb), with the nominate race averaging 6.21 kg (13.7 lb) and G. b. meridionalis of Africa averaging 5.7 kg (13 lb). In Eurasia, vultures found around the Himalayas tend to be slightly larger than those from other mountain ranges. Females are slightly larger than males. It is essentially unmistakable with other vultures or indeed other birds in flight due to its long, narrow wings, with the wing chord measuring 71.5–91 cm (28.1–35.8 in), and long, wedge-shaped tail, which measures 42.7–52 cm (16.8–20.5 in) in length. The tail is longer than the width of the wing. The tarsus is relatively small for the bird's size, at 8.8–10 cm (3.5–3.9 in). The proportions of the species have been compared to a falcon, scaled to an enormous size.

Unlike most vultures, the bearded vulture does not have a bald head. This species is relatively small-headed, although its neck is powerful and thick. It has a generally elongated, slender shape, sometimes appearing bulkier due to the often hunched back of these birds. The gait on the ground is waddling and the feet are large and powerful. The adult is mostly dark grey, rusty, and whitish in colour. It is grey-blue to grey-black above. The creamy-coloured forehead contrasts against a black band across the eyes and lores and bristles under the chin, which form a black beard that give the species its English name. Bearded vultures are variably orange or rust of plumage on their head, breast, and leg feathers, but this is thought to be cosmetic. This colouration comes from dust-bathing or rubbing iron-rich mud on its body. They also transfer the brown colour to the eggs. The tail feathers and wings are dark grey. The juveniles are dark black-brown over most of the body, with a grey-brown breast, gradually attaining more adult-like plumage over successive years; they take five to seven years to reach full maturity, with the first breeding at eight years or older. The bearded vulture is silent, apart from shrill whistles in their breeding displays and a falcon-like cheek-acheek call made around the nest.

=== Physiology ===
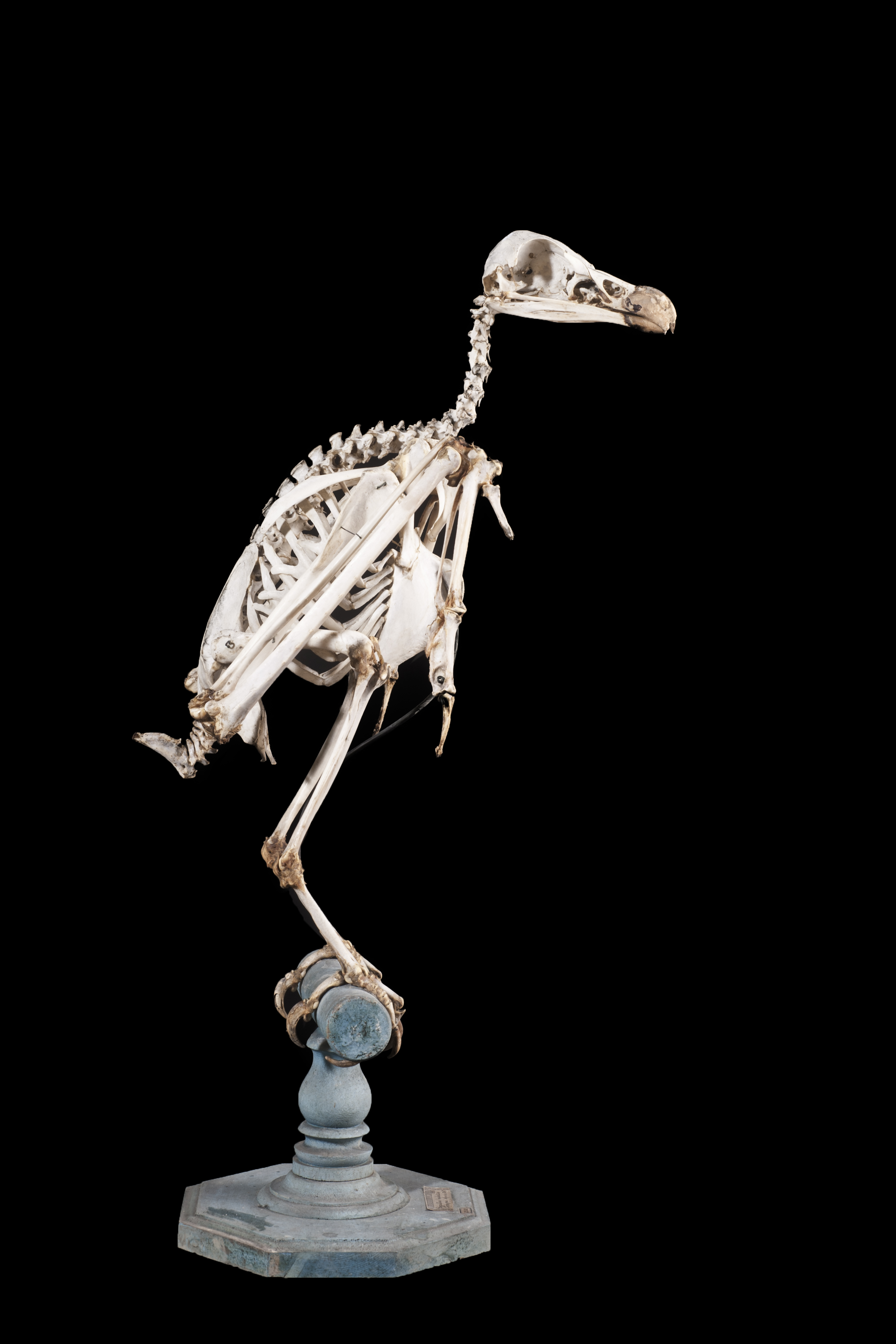
Skeleton, at the Natural History Museum of the University of Pisa

The acidity of the bearded vulture's stomach acid has been estimated at around pH 1. Large bones are digested in about 24 hours, aided by slow mixing or churning of the stomach contents. Protein retained in the bone matrix makes bones a more feasible energy source compared to that of muscle, with 140g of dry bones containing protein equivalent to 111g of muscle. The high lipid content of bone marrow make fresh bones exceed the energy content of muscle, with fresh bones containing about 108% of the energy of fresh meat by weight. A skeleton left on a mountain will dehydrate and become protected from bacterial degradation, and the bearded vulture can return to consume the remainder of a carcass even months after the soft parts have been consumed by other animals, larvae, and bacteria.

== Distribution and habitat ==
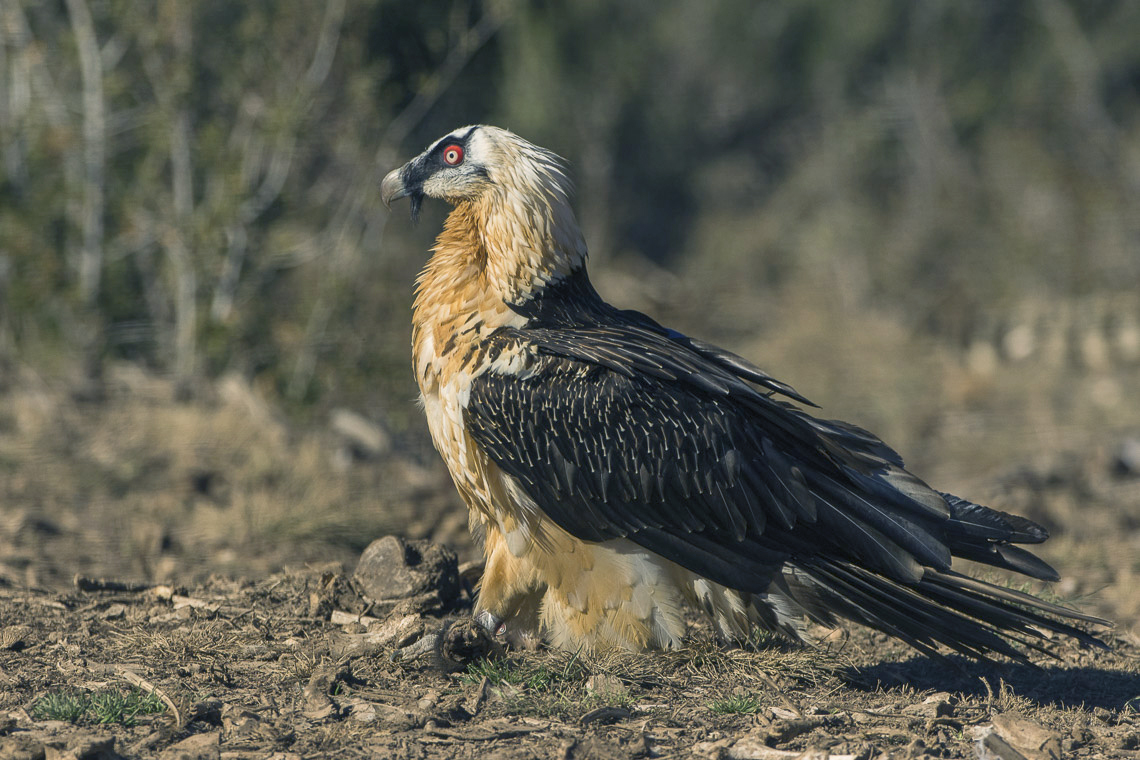
Bearded vulture in the Pyrenees, Spain

The bearded vulture is sparsely distributed across a vast range. It occurs in mountainous regions in the Pyrenees, the Alps, the Arabian Peninsula, the Caucasus region, the Zagros Mountains and Alborz Mountains in Iran, the Koh-i-Baba in Bamyan, Afghanistan, the Altai Mountains, the Himalayas, Ladakh in northern India, and western and central China. In Africa, it lives in the Atlas Mountains, the Ethiopian Highlands and south from Sudan to northeastern Democratic Republic of the Congo, central Kenya, and northern Tanzania. An isolated population inhabits the Drakensberg in South Africa. It has been reintroduced in several places in Spain, such as the Sierras de Cazorla, Segura and Las Villas Jaén, the Province of Castellón and Asturias. The resident population as of 2018 was estimated at 1,200 to 1,500 individuals.

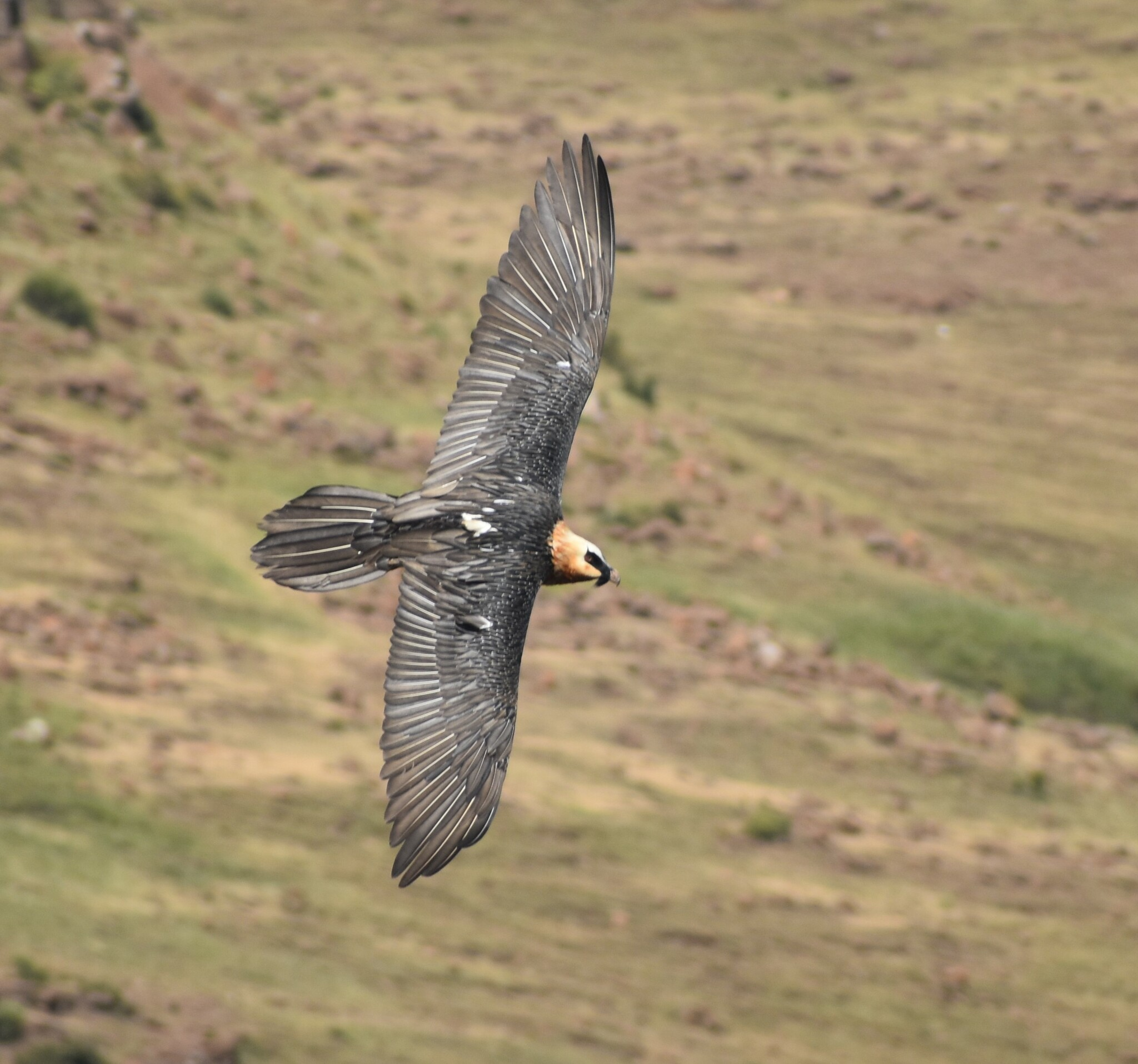
G. b. meridionalis dorsal view in flight, in Lesotho

In Israel it is locally extinct as a breeder since 1981, but young birds have been reported in 2000, 2004, and 2016. The species is extinct in Romania, the last specimens from the Carpathians being shot in 1927. However, unconfirmed sightings of the bearded vulture happened in the 2000s, and in 2016 a specimen from a restoration project in France also flew over the country before returning to the Alps.

In southern Africa, the total population as of 2010 was estimated at 408 adult birds and 224 young birds of all age classes therefore giving an estimate of about 632 birds.

In Ethiopia, it is common at garbage dumps tips on the outskirts of small villages and towns. Although it occasionally descends to 300–600 m (980–1,970 ft), the bearded vulture is rare below altitudes of 1,000 m (3,300 ft) and normally resides above 2,000 m (6,600 ft) in some parts of its range. It typically lives around or above the tree line which are often near the tops of the mountains, at up to 2,000 m (6,600 ft) in Europe, 4,500 m (14,800 ft) in Africa and 5,000 m (16,000 ft) in central Asia. In southern Armenia, it breeds below 1,000 m (3,300 ft) if cliff availability permits. It has even been observed living at elevations of 7,500 m (24,600 ft) in the Himalayas and been observed flying at a height of 7,300 m (24,000 ft).

There are two records of bearded vultures from the Alps reintroduction schemes which have reached the United Kingdom, with the first sighting taking place in 2016 in Wales and the Westcountry. A series of sightings took place in 2020, when an individual bird was sighted separately over the Channel Island of Alderney after migrating north through France, then in the Peak District, Derbyshire, Cambridgeshire, and Lincolnshire. The bird, nicknamed 'Vigo' by Tim Birch of the Derbyshire Wildlife Trust, originated from the reintroduced population in the Alps. As these two birds were both released captive birds, not wild, they have been placed in Category E ("escapes"), and not added to the formal British bird list.

A confirmed first sighting in Sweden occurred outside of Arvika in western Sweden in June 2022. Another specimen was sighted on Öland in June 2026.

== Behaviour and ecology ==
=== Diet and feeding ===
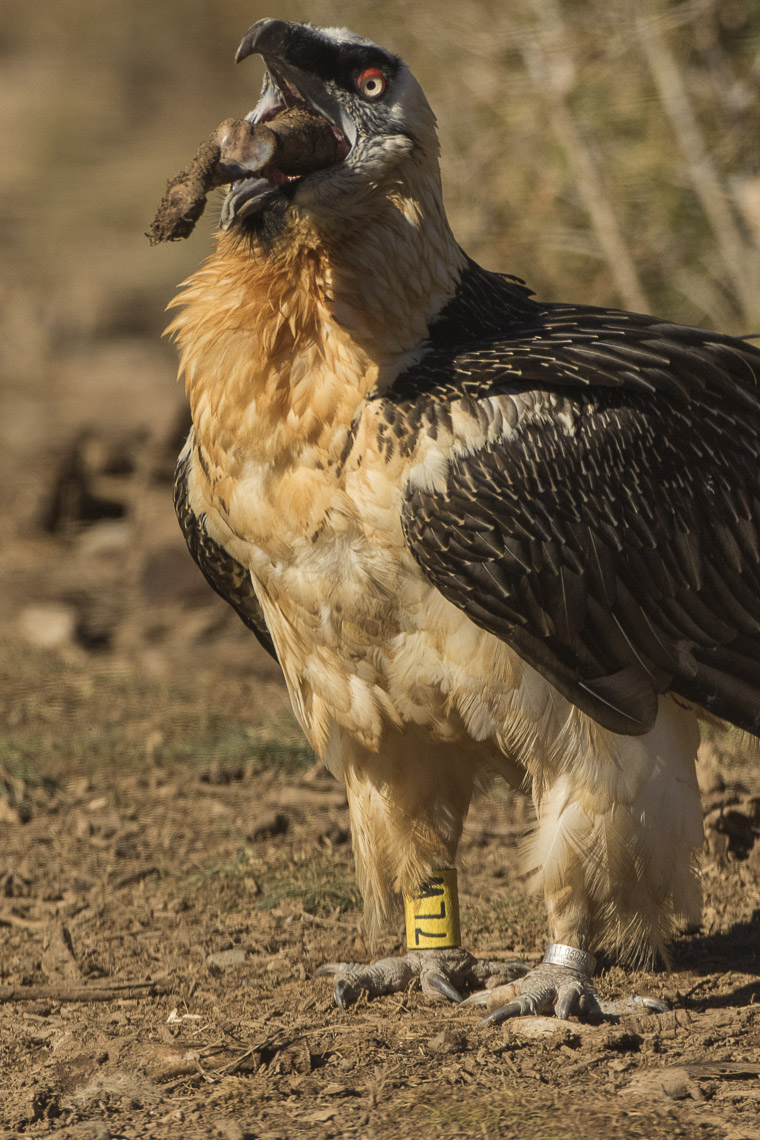
Swallowing a bone, in the Pyrenees, Spain

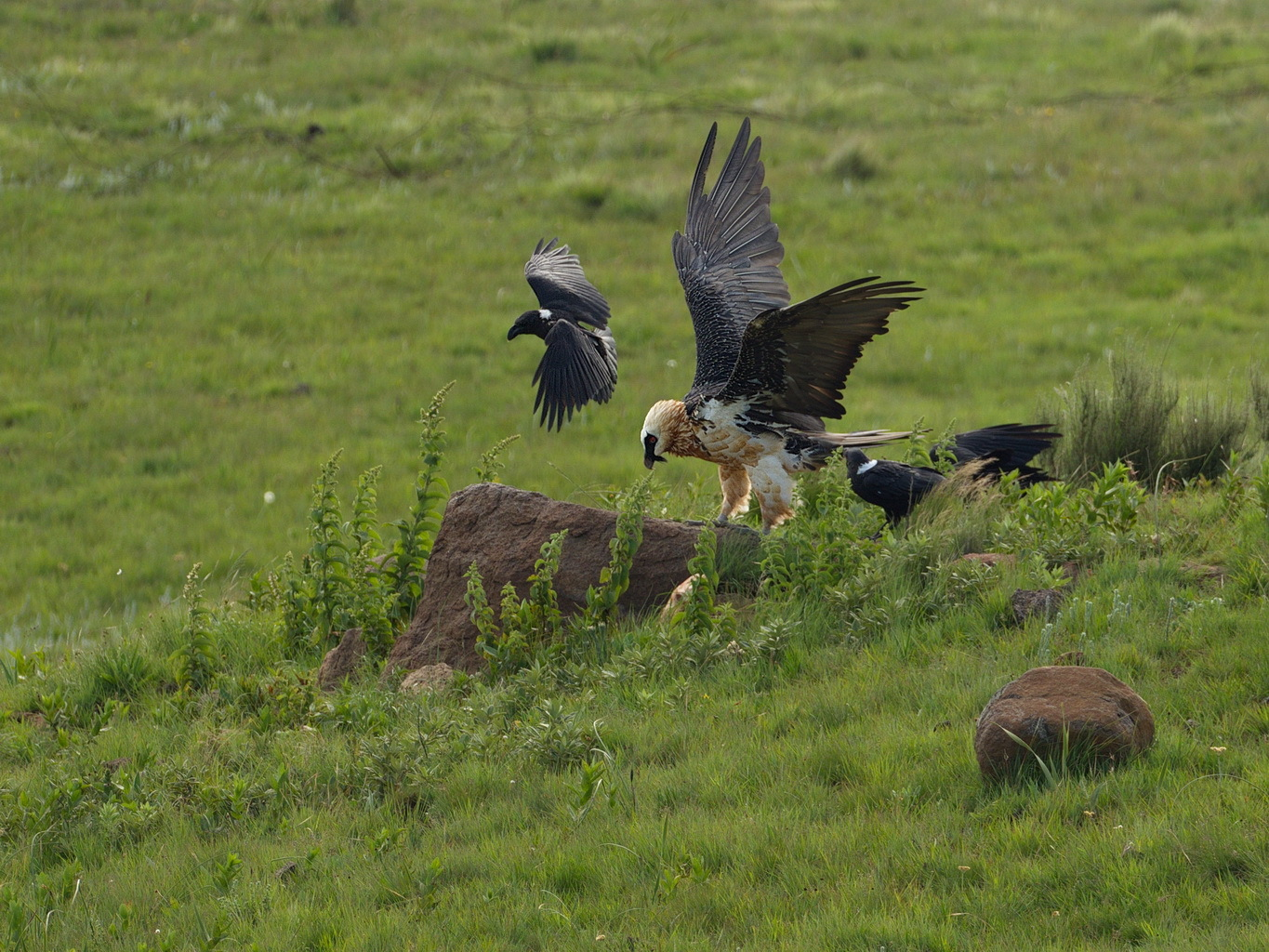
G. b. meridionalis with white-necked ravens, in South Africa

The bearded vulture is a scavenger, feeding mostly on the remains of dead animals. Its diet comprises mammals (93%), birds (6%) and reptiles (1%), with medium-sized ungulates (i.e. hoofed mammals) forming a large part of the diet. It usually disdains the actual meat and typically lives on 85–90% bones including bone marrow. This is the only living bird species that specializes in feeding on bones. Meat and skin only makes up a small part of what the adults eat, but scraps of meat or skin makes up a larger amount of the chicks' diet. The bearded vulture can swallow whole or bite through brittle bones up to the size of a lamb's femur and its powerful digestive system quickly dissolves even large pieces. Their favoured variants of bones to consume consist of fattier and elongated bones like tarsal bones and tibias. They contain higher levels of oleic acid that is more nutritional for them than smaller bones, which contain less accessible bone marrow. The bearded vulture will crack bones too large to be swallowed by carrying them in flight to a height of 50–150 m (160–490 ft) above the ground and then dropping them onto rocks below, which smashes them into smaller pieces and exposes the nutritious marrow. They can fly with bones up to 10 cm (3.9 in) in diameter and weighing over 4 kg (8.8 lb), or nearly equal to their own weight.

After dropping the large bones, the bearded vulture spirals or glides down to inspect them and may repeat the act if the bone is not sufficiently cracked. This learned skill requires extensive practice by immature birds and takes up to seven years to master. Its old name of ossifrage ("bone breaker") relates to this habit. Less frequently, these birds have been observed trying to break bones (usually of a medium size) by hammering them with their bill directly into rocks while perched. During the breeding season they feed mainly on carrion. They prefer the limbs of sheep and other small mammals and they carry the food to the nest, unlike other vultures which feed their young by regurgitation.

Bearded vultures sometimes attack live prey: perhaps more often than other vultures. Among these, tortoises seem to be especially favoured depending on their local abundance. Tortoises preyed on may be nearly as heavy as the preying vulture. To kill tortoises, bearded vultures fly with them to some height and drop them to crack open the bulky reptiles' hard shells. Golden eagles have been observed to kill tortoises in the same way. Other live animals, up to nearly their own size, have been observed to be seized predaceously and dropped in flight. Among these are rock hyraxes, hares, marmots and, in one case, a 62 cm (24 in) long monitor lizard. Larger animals have been known to be attacked by bearded vultures, including ibex, Capra goats, chamois, and steenbok. These animals have been killed by being surprised by the large birds and battered with wings until they fall off precipitous rocky edges to their deaths; although in some cases these may be accidental killings when both the vulture and the mammal surprise each other. Many large animals killed by bearded vultures are unsteady young, or have appeared sickly or obviously injured. Humans have been anecdotally reported to have been killed in the same way. This is unconfirmed, however, and if it does happen, most biologists who have studied the birds generally agree it would be accidental on the part of the vulture. Occasionally smaller ground-dwelling birds, such as partridges and pigeons, have been reported eaten, possibly either as fresh carrion (which is usually ignored by these birds) or killed with beating wings by the vulture. When foraging for bones or live prey while in flight, bearded vultures fly fairly low over the rocky ground, staying around 2–4 m (6 ft 7 in – 13 ft 1 in) high. Occasionally, breeding pairs may forage and hunt together. In the Ethiopian Highlands, bearded vultures have adapted to living largely off human refuse.

=== Reproduction and life cycle ===
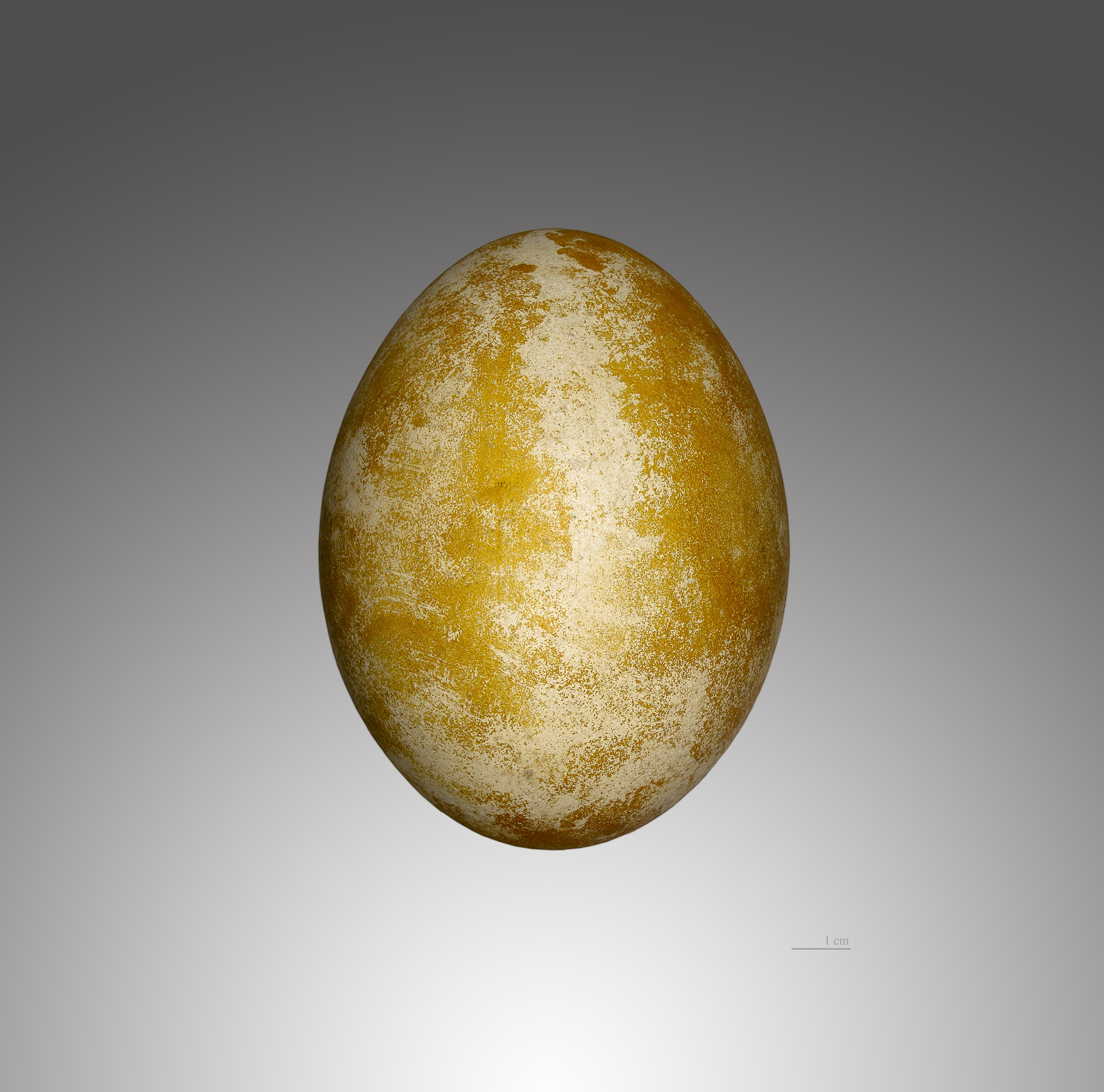
A bearded vulture egg

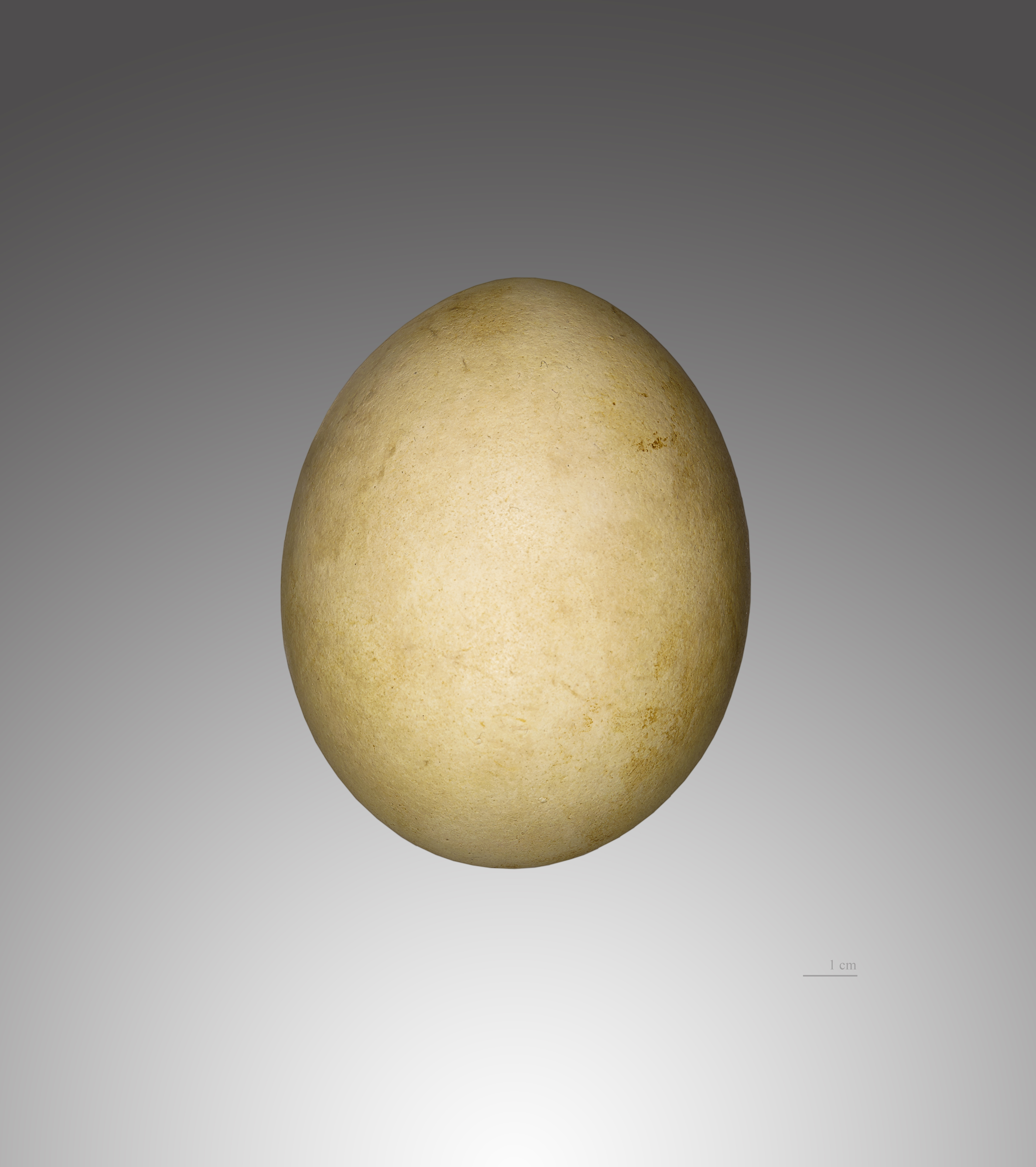
A bearded vulture egg with differing staining

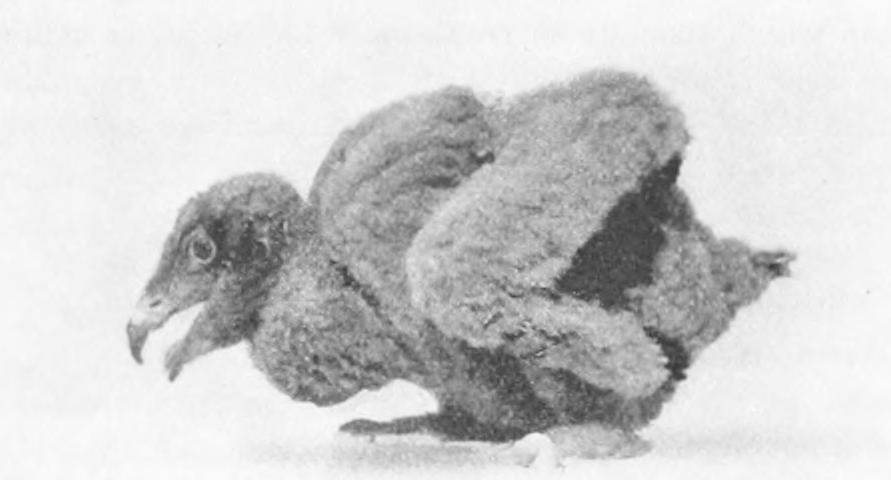
Nestling

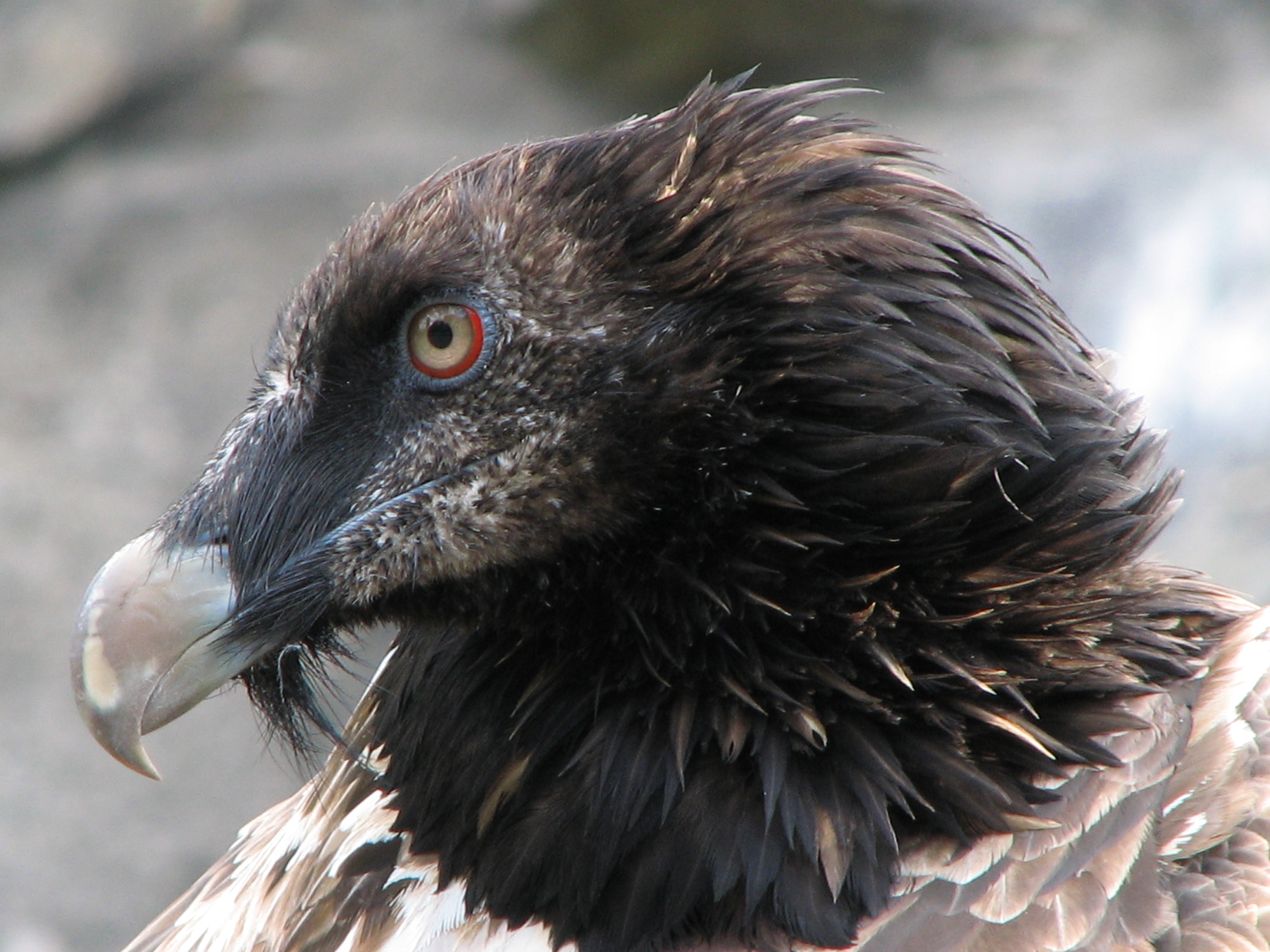
Juvenile

The bearded vulture occupies an enormous territory year-round. It may forage over 2 km^{2} (0.77 sq mi) each day. The breeding period is variable, being December through September in Eurasia, November to June in the Indian subcontinent, October to May in Ethiopia, throughout the year in eastern Africa, and May to January in southern Africa. Although generally solitary, the bond between a breeding pair is often considerably close. Biparental monogamous care occurs in the bearded vulture. In a few cases, polyandry has been recorded in the species. The territorial and breeding display between bearded vultures is often spectacular, involving the showing of talons, tumbling, and spiraling while in solo flight. The large birds also regularly lock feet with each other and fall some distance through the sky with each other. In Europe, the breeding pairs of bearded vultures are estimated to be 120. The mean productivity of the bearded vulture is 0.43±0.28 fledglings per breeding pair per year and the breeding success averaged 0.56±0.30 fledglings per pair with clutches/year.

The nest is a massive pile of sticks, that goes from around 1 m (3 ft 3 in) across and 69 cm (27 in) deep when first constructed up to 2.5 m (8 ft 2 in) across and 1 m (3 ft 3 in) deep, with a covering of various animal matter from food, after repeated uses. The female usually lays a clutch of 1 to 2 eggs, though 3 have been recorded on rare occasions, which are incubated for 53 to 60 days. After hatching, the young spend 100 to 130 days in the nest before fledging. The young may be dependent on the parents for up to 2 years, forcing the parents to nest in alternate years on a regular basis. Typically, the bearded vulture nests in caves and on ledges and rock outcrops or caves on steep rock walls, so are very difficult for nest-predating mammals to access. Wild bearded vultures have a mean lifespan of 21.4 years, but have lived for up to at least 45 years in captivity.

Bearded vulture nests can be used for centuries by multiple generations of birds, as evidenced by the discovery, in the same nest, of objects, such as shoes, dated (by carbon-14) to different periods, spanning from the 13th to the 19th centuries. The nest was located in southern Spain, in an area where the species became extinct around the beginning of the 20th century.

== Threats ==
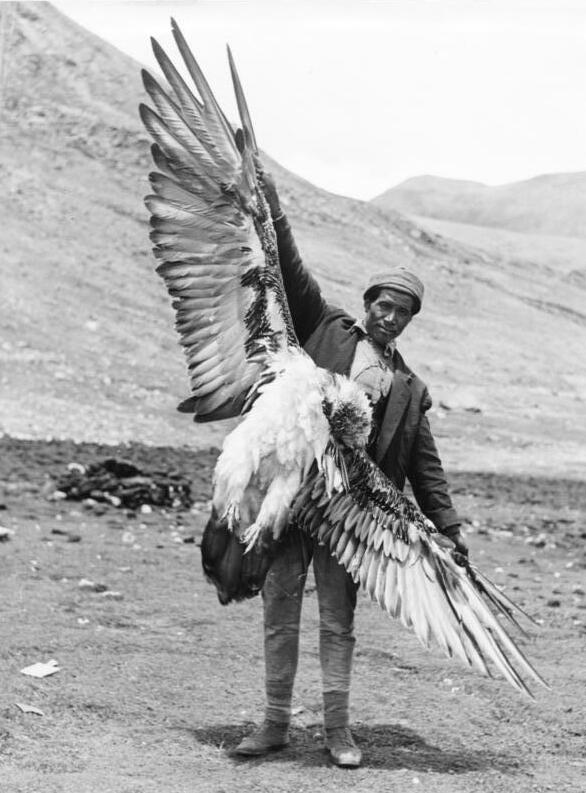
1938 photo of a Sikkim sherpa holding a slain bearded vulture

The bearded vulture is listed as near threatened on the IUCN Red List. It is one of the most endangered European bird species as over the last century its abundance and breeding range have drastically declined. It naturally occurs at low densities, with anywhere from a dozen to 500 pairs in each mountain range in Eurasia where it breeds. It is most common in Ethiopia, where an estimated 1,400 to 2,200 pairs are estimated to breed. Relatively large, healthy numbers seem to occur in some parts of the Himalayas as well. It was almost wiped out in Europe. By the start of the 20th century, significant numbers occurred only in the Spanish and French Pyrenees. Since then, it has been successfully reintroduced to the Swiss and Italian Alps, from where it has spread into France.

The 20th century extinction of the bearded vulture in Central Europe is mainly attributed to human persecution through hunting and poisoning. The increase of the human population and expansion of infrastructure results in the declines of the bearded vulture populations. The increase of infrastructure includes the building of houses, roads, and power lines. A major issue with infrastructure and bird species populations is collision with power lines. The declines of bearded vulture populations have been documented throughout its range resulting from a decrease in habitat space, fatal collisions with energy infrastructure, reduced food availability, poisons left out for carnivores and direct persecution in the form of trophy hunting.

The species suffers from low genetic diversity and inbreeding, which is most severe in southern African populations.

== Conservation ==
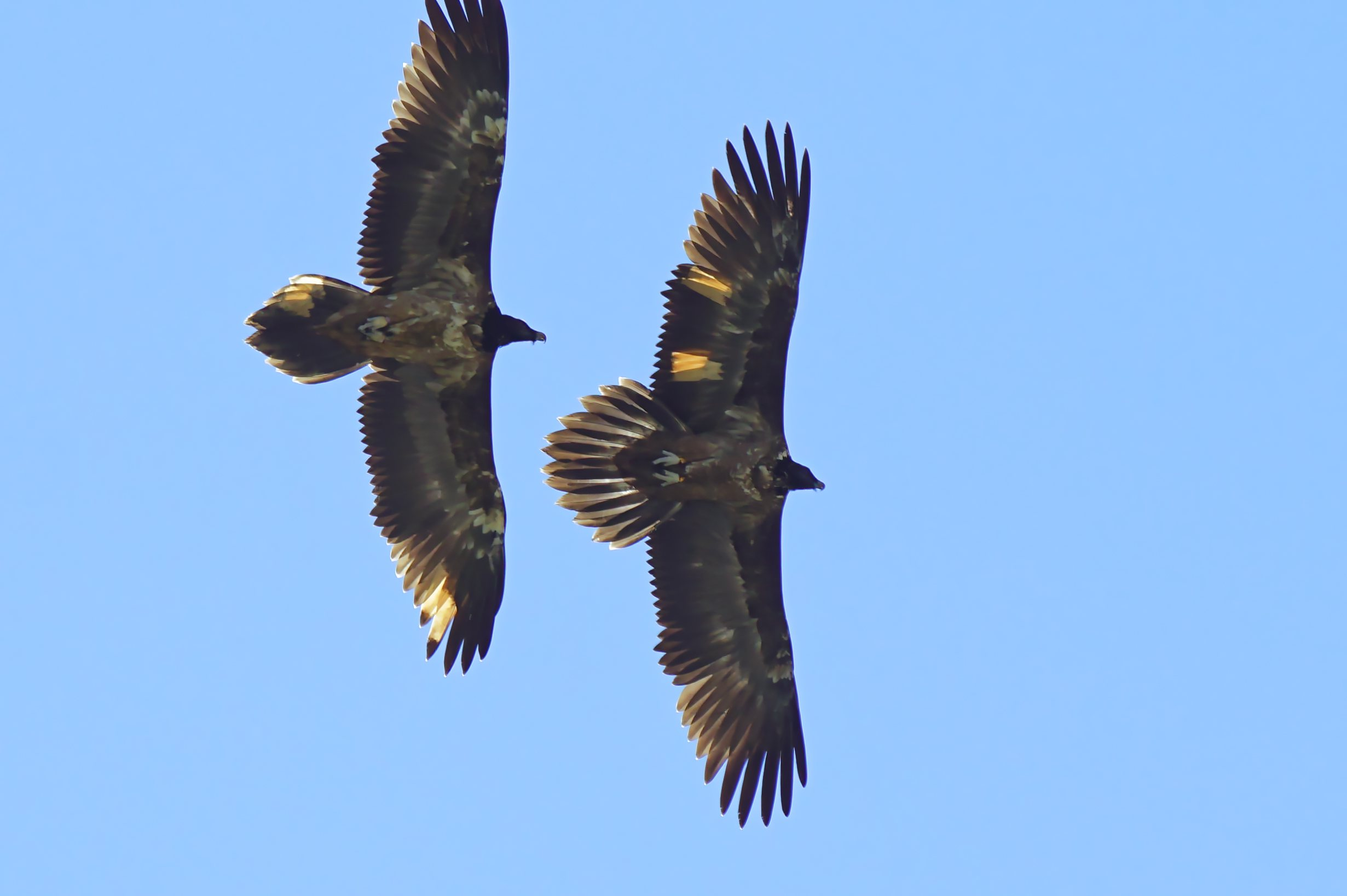
In 2021, two bearded vultures were reintroduced to Bavaria for the first time. Bavaria (left) and Wally (right) were two young females.

Mitigation plans have been established to reduce the population declines in bearded vulture populations. One of these plans includes the South African Biodiversity Management Plan that has been ratified by the government to stop the population decline in the short term. Actions that have been implemented include the mitigation of existing and proposed energy structures to prevent collision risks, the improved management of supplementary feeding sites as well to reduce the populations from being exposed to human persecution and poisoning accidents and outreach programmes that are aimed at reducing poisoning incidents.

The Foundation for the Conservation of the Bearded Vulture (Spanish: Fundación para la Conservación del Quebrantahuesos), established in Spain in 1995, was created in response to the national population dropping to 30 specimens by the end of the 20th century. Focused on conserving the species in the Pyrenees, it also returned the species to other already extinct areas such as the Picos de Europa in the north of the country or the Sierra de Cazorla, in the south. After 25 years of work, the Foundation reported that they had managed to recover the population, with more than 1,000 individuals throughout the country.

=== Reintroduction in the Alps ===
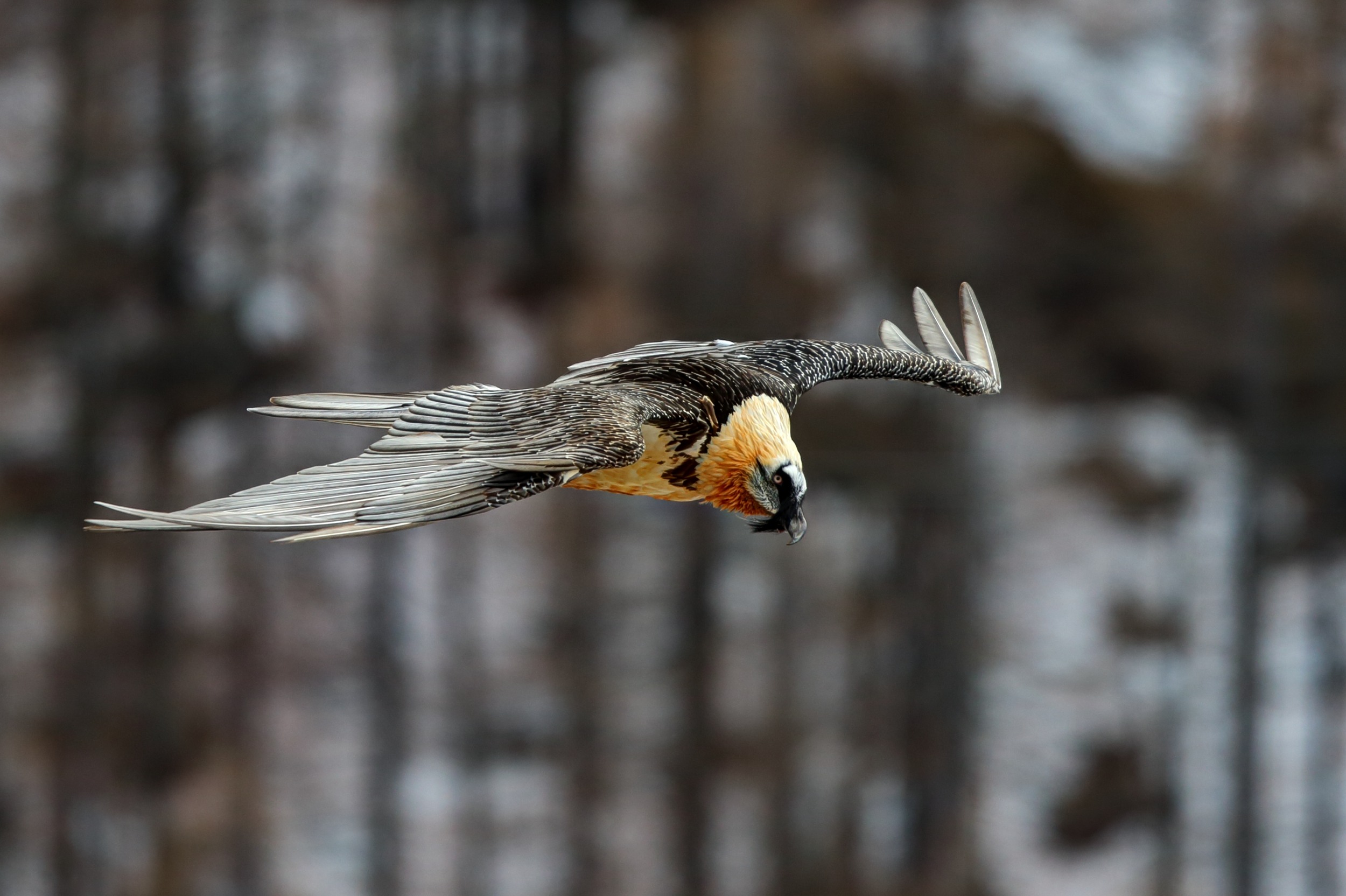
A bearded vulture flying over Gran Paradiso National Park

In the Alps, bearded vultures were being shot as late as 1913, and were completely locally extinct in the Alps by the 1930s. Efforts to reintroduce the bearded vulture began in the 1970s in the French Alps with the release of vultures that had been captured in Afghanistan; but this approach proved unsuccessful as it was too difficult to capture the vultures in the first place, and too many died in transport on their way to France. A second attempt was made in 1987, using a technique called "hacking", in which young individuals (between 90 and 100 days in age) from zoological parks would be taken from the nest and placed in a protected area in the Alps. As they were still unable to fly at that age, the chicks were hand-fed by humans until the birds learned to fly and were able to reach food without human assistance. This method has proven more successful, with over 200 birds released in the Alps from 1987 to 2015, and a bearded vulture population has reestablished itself in the Alps.

The reintroduced population in the Alps is descended mainly from birds of Eastern European or Asian populations.

== In culture ==
The bearded vulture is considered a threatened species in Iran. Iranian mythology considers the rare bearded vulture (Persian: هما; lit. 'Homa') the symbol of luck and happiness. It was believed that if the shadow of a Homa fell on one, he would rise to sovereignty and anyone shooting the bird would die in forty days. The habit of eating bones and apparently not killing living animals was noted by Sa'di in Gulistan, written in 1258, and Emperor Jahangir had a bird's crop examined in 1625 to find that it was filled with bones.

The Greek playwright Aeschylus was said to have been killed in 456 or 455 BC by a tortoise dropped by an eagle who mistook his bald head for a stone. If this incident did occur, the bearded vulture is a likely candidate for the "eagle" in this story.

The ancient Greeks used ornithomancers to guide their political decisions: bearded vultures, or ossifrage, were one of the few species of birds that could yield valid signs to these soothsayers.

In Tibet, corpses are fed to this vulture. The rite is called a "sky burial" and is accompanied by prayers and mantras for the deceased person. There is a specialist assigned to this task which occurs high in the mountains where the vultures swoop down to eat the bones. The birds are blessed too. They are called "jagod" in the Tibetan language.

In the Bible/Torah, the bearded vulture, as the ossifrage, is among the birds forbidden to be eaten (Leviticus 11:13).

In 1944, Shimon Peres and David Ben-Gurion found a nest of bearded vultures in the Negev desert. The bird is called peres in Hebrew, and Shimon Persky liked it so much he adopted it as his surname.
