= Ural-batyr =

Bashkir folk epic

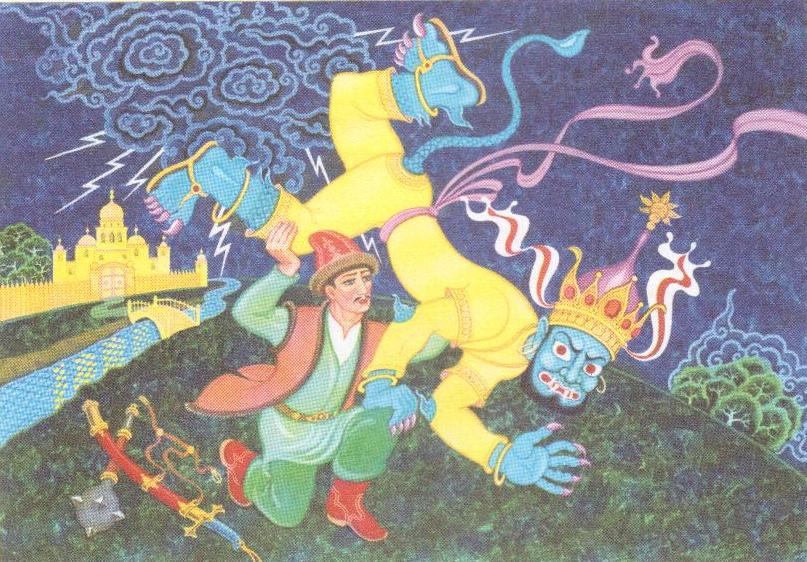
A young man is fighting with div

Ural-batyr or Oral-batır (Bashkir: Урал батыр, pronounced [oˈɾɑɫ.bɑˌtɯ̞ɾ], from Ural + Turkic batır 'hero, brave man') is the most famous kubair (epic poem) of the Bashkirs. It is a telling of heroic deeds and legendary creatures, the formation of natural phenomena, and so on.

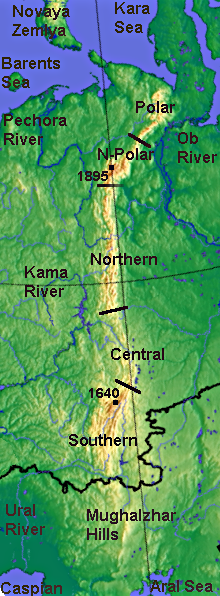
The Ural Mountains

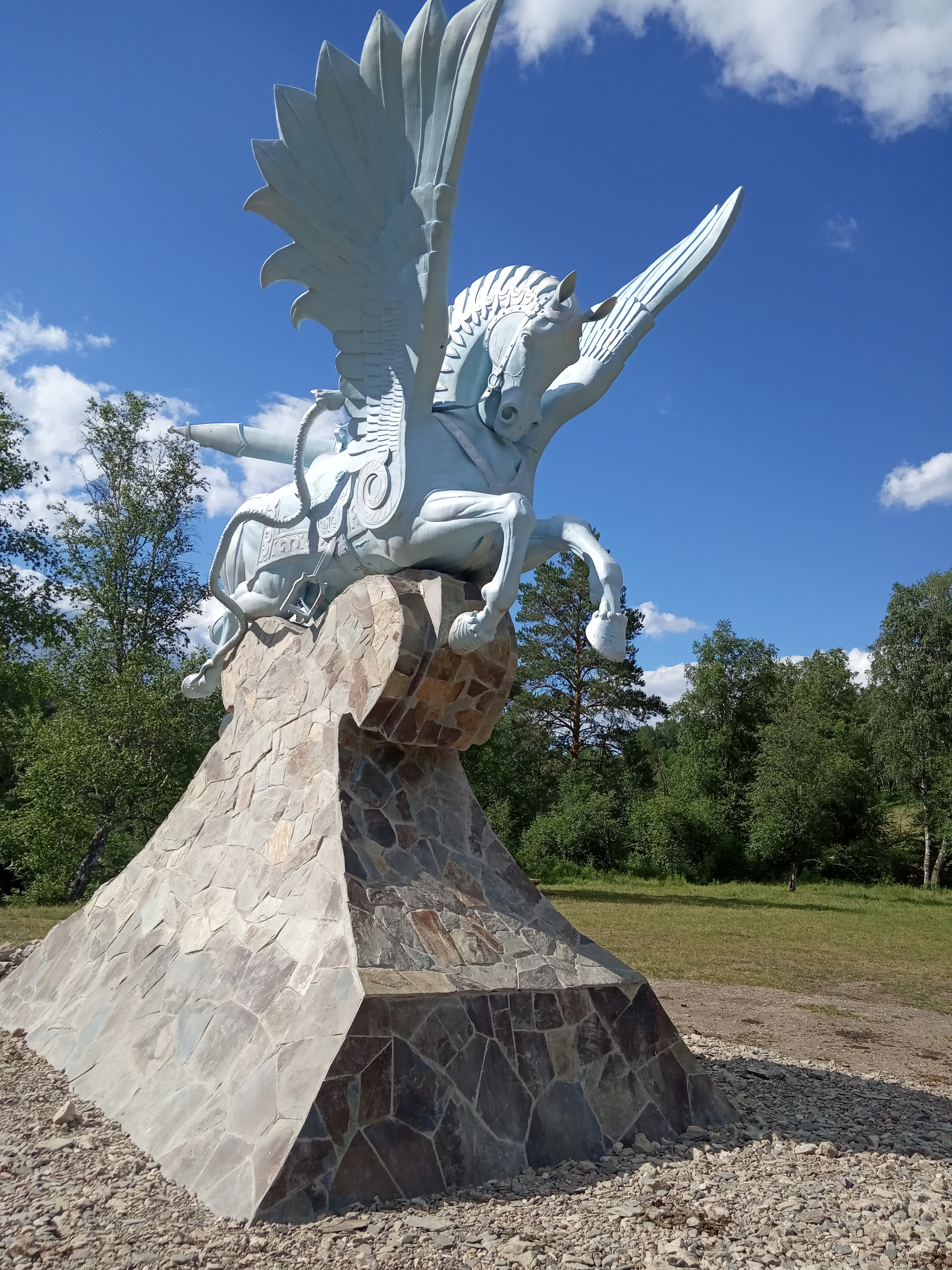
Horse Akbuzat near Lake Yylkysykkan, Burzyansky District, Bashkortostan (2019)

== Plot ==
Based on the Turkic and Iranic folk song traditions, the poem narrates about the heroic deeds of Ural-batyr. Ural is born to an elderly couple, Yanbike and Yənberði. (Note: Yan (from Persian word جان jan, meaning "soul"), and Yənberði means "Given Soul", while Yanbike means "Woman of Soul".) Ural evinces from his very infancy all the features of a legendary hero, such as unflinching courage, honesty, kindheartedness, empathy, and great physical strength. Unlike his cunning and treacherous brother Shulgan, Ural is an eager enemy of the evil and of Death which personifies it. Having matured, Ural sets out on the quest for Death, with the desire to find and destroy Him. On his way, he meets with various people and legendary creatures and is often deferred by long adventures; in all cases, his actions serve to save lives or quell the evil. Riding his winged stallion Akbuthat (or Akbuz At 'White-Grey Horse'), he saves young men and women prepared for sacrifice by the tyrannical Shah Katil from imminent death, tames a wild bull, destroys an immense number of devs (дейеү), marries the legendary Humai (from Persian همای Humay), a swan-maid, and finally smites the chief dev (from Persian دیو div) Azraka, whose dead body is said to have formed Mount Yaman-tau in the South Urals. Ural perishes in his final grapple with the devs, as he is forced to drink up a whole lake where they had hidden from him, but he leaves his sons to continue his initiative.

== History ==
The poem, originally existing solely in the oral form of a song, was set in the written form by the Bashkir folk poet Mukhamedsha Burangulov in 1910. This story is very ancient, and reminiscent of stories from Babylon and Sumer. There are traces of Iranian civilization in Bashkort culture, as some words and names of cities and people.

The epic was transmitted orally from generation to generation by storytellers – sėsėns. In 1910, Mukhamedsha Burangulov recorded an epic from two kuraist ('musician') and sesens ('poet'), Gabit Argynbaev (≈ 1850–1921) from the аul ('village') of Idris and Khamit Almukhametov (1861–1923) from the village of Malyi Itkul (volost Itkulskaya of the Orenburg province). Researchers believe that M. Burangulov came to sesens more than once, wrote down the epic in parts. Researchers found that both storytellers came from the Burzyan clan. Both sesen knew well the area around the Shulgan-Tash Cave and Lakes Shulgankul, Yylkysykkankul (they are described in the epic). Gabit-sesen's grandfather Argynbay moved from the highlands of Burzyan to the steppe region. Both sesen were in kinship.

There are known other versions of the epic. A fairy tale of the same name in prose was recorded in 1956 by Ismagil Rakhmatullin in the village of Imangul in the Uchalinsky district of Bashkorostan by researcher Akhnaf Kharisov (published by him in the same year). The version, conventionally referred to as an "etiological myth", was recorded in 1984 from Shamsia Safargalina in the village of Gabbas, Zianchurinsky district of Bashkortostan.

In 1968, the epic "Ural-Batyr" was published in the Bashkir language in the journal "Agidel" in 1968 with abbreviations (prepared by B. Bikbai and A. Kharisov). In 1972, the first full publication in the Bashkir language took place – in the first volume of the book series Bashkir Folk Oeuvre.

In 1975, it was published in the first volume of the collection Heroic Epic of the Peoples of the USSR in the series Library of World Literature (translation by A. Kh. Khakimov, I. S. Kychakov, A. S. Mirbadalev), and also in the series The Epos of the Peoples of the USSR (per. A. Kh. Khakimov, N. V. Kidysh-Pokrovskaya, A. S. Mirbadalev) in abbreviated form.

For the first time, the profound originality of the epic "Ural-Batyr" was announced in the works of A. A. Petrosyan. She was the first of the researchers to discover a plot similarity between the Bashkir epic and the Sumerian-Akkadian epic about Gilgamesh. But she came to the conclusion that there are deep differences in the ideological and artistic concepts of these works:

"The main motive of the epic Ural-Batyr is that man is stronger than all that is, good is indestructible. The Babylonian epic rests on another idea – everything from the will of the gods."

The philosopher Damir Valeyev considered the epos "a source for studying the history of social consciousness and social thought of the Bashkirs".

There are several translations of the epic into Russian, both interlinear and poetic. Translations into Russian were made by several writers and poets. The prose arrangement of the epic was performed by the writer Aidar Khusainov; the poetic translation into Russian was done by the poet Gazim Shafikov.

In 2003, a gift edition of the epos was published in Ufa in three languages (Bashkir original, Russian translation by G. G. Shafikov and English translation by S. G. Shafikov). In 2006, "Ural-Batyr" was published in German, translated by the doctor of philology Aliya Taysina (Germany).

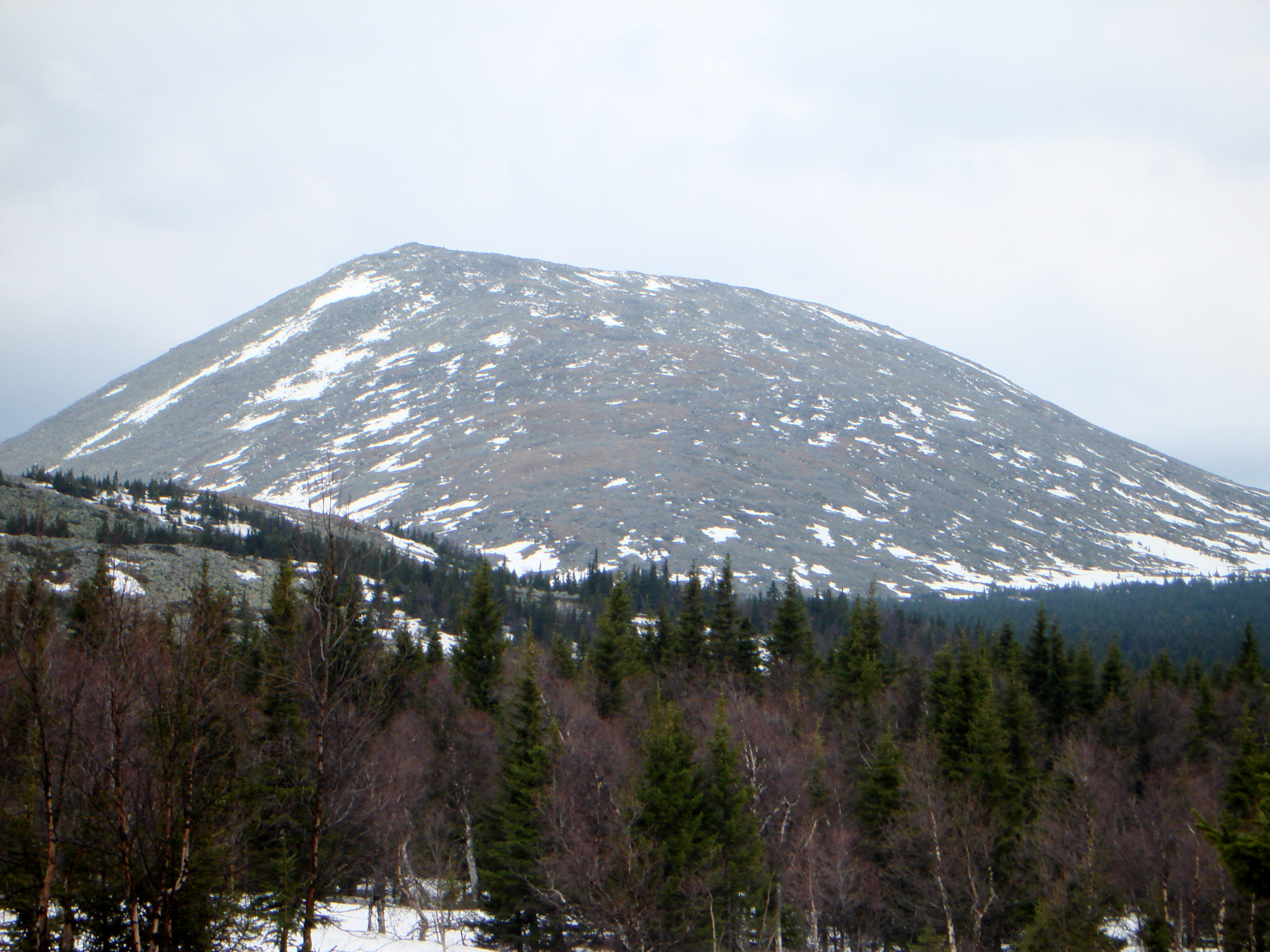
Mount Iremel.

The epos "Ural-Batyr" has also been translated into other world languages, such as Abkhazian, Hebrew, Turkish, Chuvash, and French.

In 2007, the original text of the Ural-Batyr was first published

In 2013, the Ural-Batyr was published in three books, in Bashkir and Russian (translation by A. Kh. Khakimov), in Bashkir and French (translation by R. K. Garipov), in English and Bashkir (translation by Z. A. Rakhimova) languages.

All previous publications of the epic contained distortions. The reasons for the uncritical publication of the epic lie in the Soviet practice of distorting monuments of folk art, in the persecution of Bashkir scholars (Mukhametsha Burangulov was twice arrested and was in prison). The manuscript of the epic is lost.

The decisions of the Central Committee of the Communist Party on the Bashkir party organization banned a number of folklore monuments. However, despite the persecution of folklore collectors, the epic survived. After his returning from prison M. Burangulov fought for the right to be creative and defended the works of Bashkir folklore.

The original in a typewritten copy in Latin script (verses with prosaic inserts) with several handwritten corrections (probably by M. Burangulov himself) is stored in the Scientific Archive of the Ufa Scientific Center of the Russian Academy of Sciences.

Scientists continue to study the epic "Ural-Batyr" in-depth at the intersection of archeology, ethnography, linguistic folkloristics. Along with folklorists, the Bashkir archaeologists, linguists, philosophers, and ethnographers also studied the epic "Ural-Batyr" (G.B. Khusainov, D.Zh. Valeev, Z.Ya. Rakhmatullina, A. Kh. Davletkulov, Z.G. Aminev, F. B. Sanyarov, G. Kh. Bukharova, V. G. Kotov).

In 2011, the bibliographic index "Bashkir National Cubair (Epic) 'Ural-Batyr'" was released, which presents a list of materials reflecting the results of a comprehensive study of the epic (publications from the publication of its text in a journal version in 1968 to our time).

In Bashkortostan, much is being done to popularize the epic. The performance Ural-Batyr was staged at the Bashkir Academic Drama Theater named after M. Gafuri, the popular science film In Search of Akbuzat was created, and the tourist project "The Golden Ring of Bashkortostan: the roads of the epic 'Ural-Batyr'" was developed. Every year, a contest is held for the best reciters of the epic in Bashkir and other languages. Performances based on the epic are included in the repertoire of the Bashkir State Puppet Theater (in Bashkir and Russian).

In 2010, by order of the Ministry of Culture of the Russian Federation, the director and screenwriter A. Lukichev shot the animated film Ural-Batyr based on the Bashkir epic (14.01 min., Moscow).

The epic "Ural-Batyr" is one of the Seven Wonders of Bashkortostan. The epic is included in the TURKSOY List of Intangible cultural heritage.

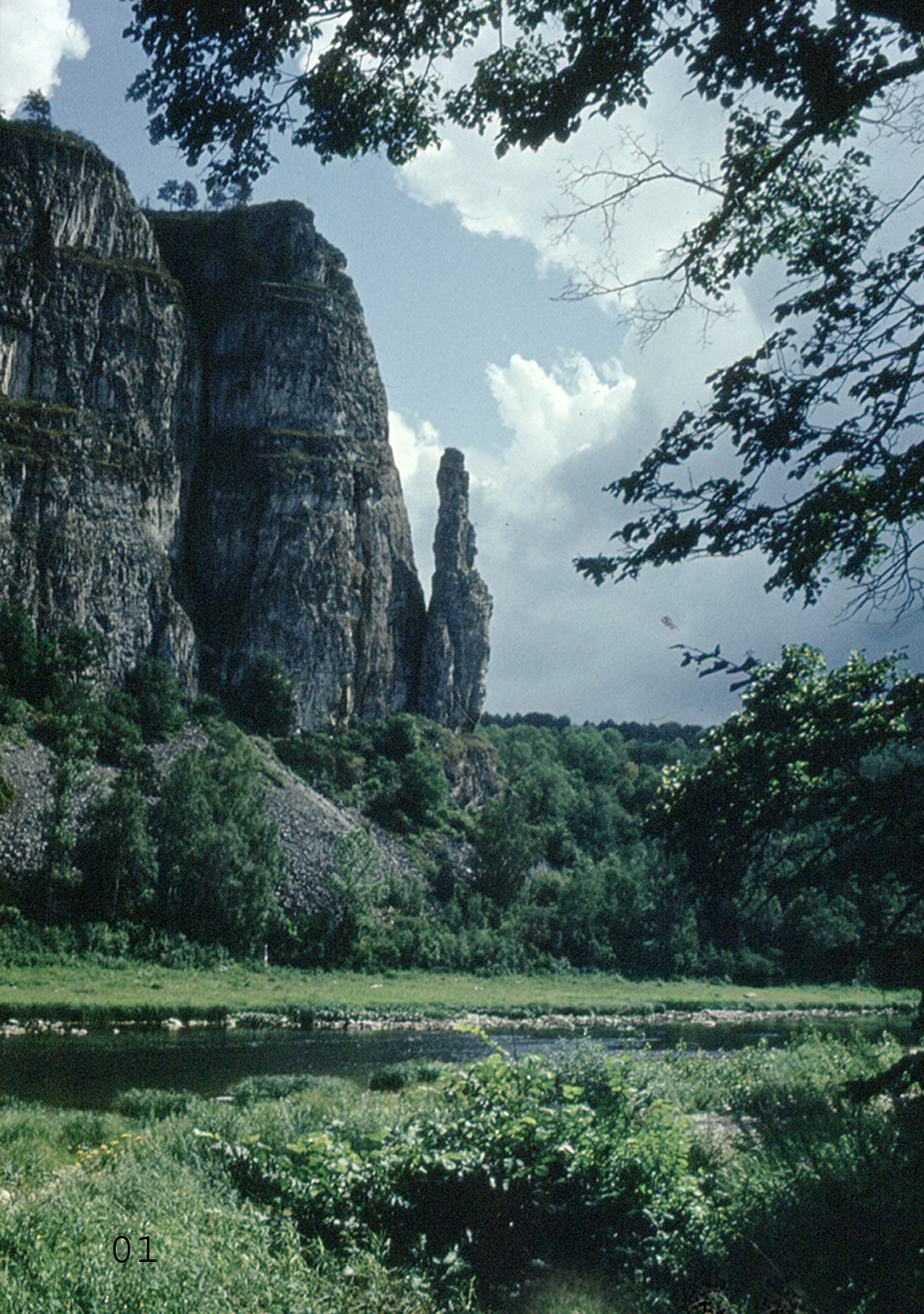
Agidel River (Belaya)

== Ural-Batyr (content) ==
The theme of the legend, despite a significant element of fairy-tale fantasy, is heroic-epic.

=== Introduction ===
Ural-Batyr is clearly divided into several parts. In the introductory part of the work, the most ancient strata are preserved: echoes of the legends of the global flood, the revival of life on earth after the flood, the first couple that laid the foundation for the human race. The elderly couple Yanbirde and Yanbike, along with their sons Shulgen and Ural, settle on a small patch of land surrounded on all sides by the sea. Yanberdi and Yanbeke's assistants are animals: gyrfalcon, lion, and pike. Ural sometimes turns to birds and animals for advice.

Ural and Shulgen personify two opposing principles – good and evil – which lead an irreconcilable struggle between themselves. Before going hunting, both parents drink the blood of animals, which gives them strength. They forbid the children to do so until they become yigits (adults).

==== Ural learns about Death ====
Shulgen goes against the ban of his father and drinks the blood of animals.

Yanberdi and Yanbeke return from hunting. Ural finds out that there is Death. But in these places Death does not appear. There is no power that can kill a person.

Yanbirde is terribly angry with his sons when he learns that one of them had tasted blood.

Ural delivers a speech in front of animals and birds. He offers to stop offending the weak and to stop eating each other's meat. Then Death will remain alone and it can be destroyed. The crow is not afraid of Death. It offers the weak themselves to hide in a safe place.

==== Ural learns about the Living Spring ====
===== How the white swan is caught =====
Yanberdi and Yanbeke begin hunting together with their sons. Among the prey is a white swan. This is the daughter of the Sun, Humay; her father is the heavenly king of birds Samraw (Simurgh). The swan promises to show the path to the Living Spring (Yanshishma). Ural stands up for the bird.

But the old man and his sons do not know the way to the Living Spring. Yanberdi gives his sons powerful lions and sends them to look for the way to the Living Spring. If they meet Death on the way, they must cut off its head and bring her home. (There are many mineral springs, water, in the Urals.)

=== Part 1 ===
==== Ural and Schulgen meet the old man and cast lots ====
Years pass. The brothers have matured. Once he meets on his way an old man with a long staff. The brothers ask the old man to show them the way to the Living Spring. He indicates two roads: to the right is the land of King Samrau (the land of eternal happiness and good), and to the left is the land of King Katil (the land of eternal grief and evil). Shulgen decides to go to the kingdom of Samrau (although he falls to another lot). Ural has to go to the kingdom of Katil.

==== Ural-Batyr comes to the country of Padishah Katil ====
In the kingdom of Katil, Ural meets unfortunate people who tell him about the atrocities of the cruel king (the old woman, her daughter, the old man). Then he himself sees Katil donate people to the lake and to the fire (perhaps these were the memories of the Bashkirs about the brutality of foreign invaders).

==== Ural-Batyr meets Padishah Katil's daughter ====
Ural meets a huge crowd of naked people, and guards beat them with whips. Katil's daughter chooses Ural as her husband, giving him a golden apple. Ural refuses to become her husband. Slaves carry King Catilus, seated on a throne. He is very fat, like a fat boar. His eyes are bloodshot.

In the legend there is no scene of the struggle of Ural with the Padishah Katil. Ural fights one on one with its huge bull, and then with the four strongest heroes of the padishah.

In a duel with a bull, Ural bends its horns, and they remain forever bent; the hero knocks out the upper tooth of the bull, and it will never grow back; he tears the hooves of the animal, and they never grow together (an etiological motive). The hero says that now the bull and his tribe will become slaves of man.

Katil and his guard scatter in an unknown direction. The people ask Ural to marry the daughter of Katil and become their padishah.

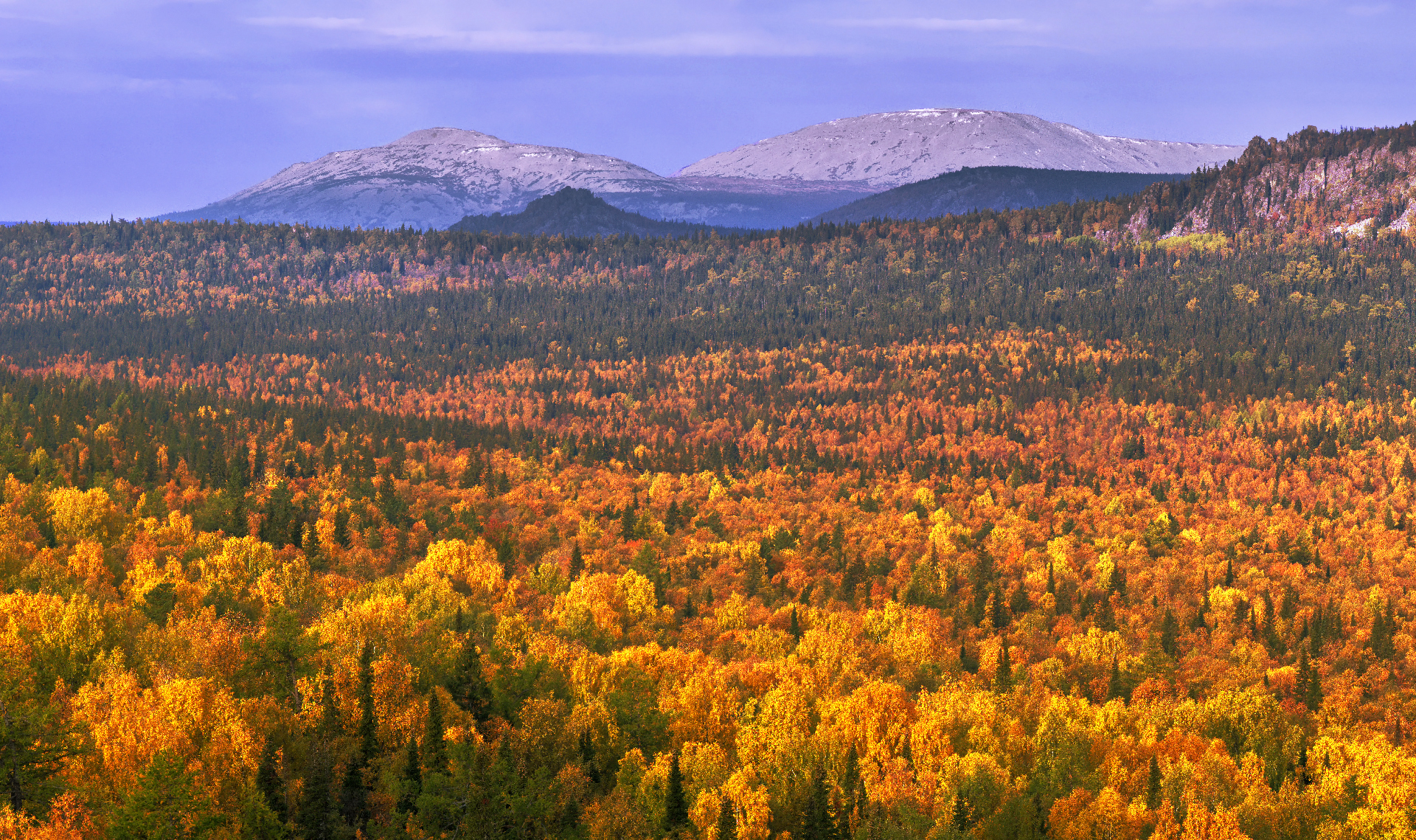
Mount Yamantau. 1640 м

=== Part 2 ===
==== Ural-Batyr meets Zarkum ====
Ural-Batyr meets Zarkum, the son of the King of serpents, Kahkaha, who wants to marry the daughter of King Samrau. Zarkum gives Ural the secret of his father. At the request of Zarkum, he breaks off the deer horns and Zarkum swallows the deer. Zarkum turns into a handsome young man. He wants to marry Homay.

==== Ural-Batyr and Zarkum arrive in the serpent kingdom ====
In Kahkaha's palace, a snake with nine heads wants to swallow Ural. But Ural hits its main head with a sword and the keys fall out. Ural hits its other heads and eight heroes come out, swallowed by a snake. The key to the palace of secrets falls from the heart of the serpent.

==== Ural-Batyr enters the palace of secrets ====
Ural opens the palace with a magic key, sees a girl on the throne, and takes the magic staff of Kahkaha. Kahkaha calls all the snakes for help. But Ural-Batyr defeats them. Kahkaha pretends to admit defeat. Ural allows the people to elect themselves a new ruler (Algur). The old hero Algur asks Ural to marry a beautiful girl (Gulistan) from the palace and leave his offspring to the people (Tul alu; getting the hero's genetic material to strengthen the people is an ancient tradition).

=== Part 3 ===
==== Schulgen meets a handsome young man ====
Schulgen (Ural's brother) met a handsome forever-young man picking flowers and is glad that he will soon be in the country of eternal happiness and youth.

==== Schulgen arrives in a happy country ====
Schulgen gets to a happy country and wants to catch fish. He sees that no one attacks each other here; everyone lives peacefully. Schulgen decides to go to the Living Spring and arranges a lunch here on his way back.

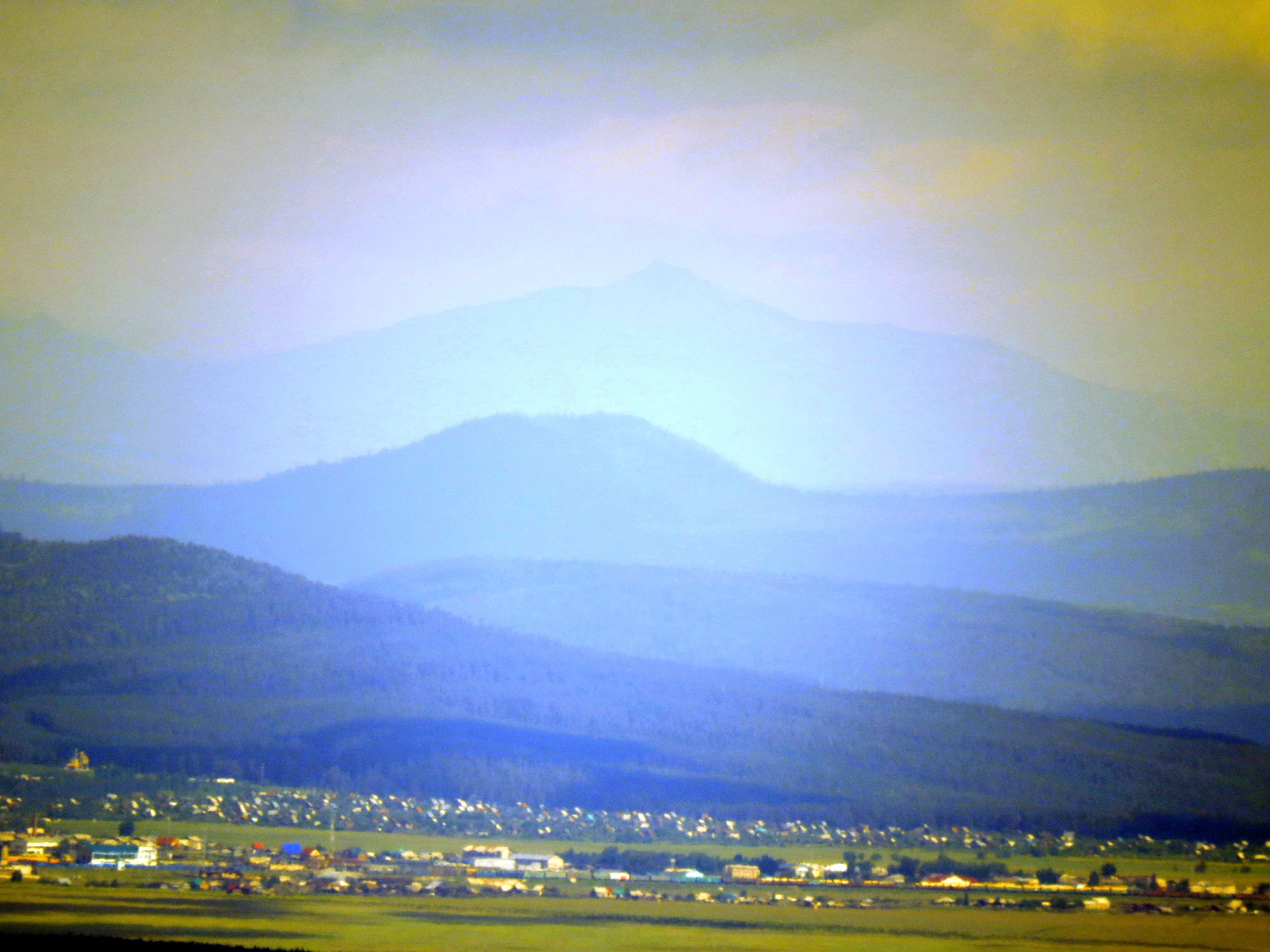
Urals, Mount Kumardak

Schulgen opens his heart to evil and meets Zarkum

Schulgen meets the handsome young man again. But it is Zarkum, who ran away from Ural Batyr. He tricks Shulgen into going into the kingdom of Azraka, the king of divas and fantastic giants.

Zarkum agrees with Azraka secretly from Shulgen on how to kill Ural. To do this, the winged horse Akbuzat must be captured. The divas who try to bring Akbuzat to Azraka's palace are thrown by the horse high into the sky, creating the constellation Yetegan (the Big Dipper). If the daughter of the king of birds, Samrau, falls in love with Shulgen, then she will give him Akbuzat and a magic sword. The divas need them to destroy Ural, the worst enemy of the divas.

==== Schulgen enters the palace of the padishah of divas, Azraka ====
Azraka warmly welcomes Schulgen, treating him in his palace and giving him rich gifts. Shulgen is offered to marry the "daughter" of Azraka, who is actually Ayhılu, the daughter of Samrau, captive of Azraka. As Azraka speaks with Shulgen and Zarkum, Azraka tells them about the magic horse Akbuzat, a damask sword that is not given to everyone and the most beautiful girl in the world – Homay. Zarkum and Schulgen decide to search for them to become stronger than everyone else.

==== Schulgen and Zarkum meet Homay ====
Divas bring Shulgen and Zarkum to the kingdom of Samrau. They end up in a flock of birds (girls). One of them is Homay. She throws Schulgen and Zarkum into different pits. Homay recognizes Schulgen and scolds him for choosing a snake as his friend. To become free, Schulgen must learn to choose his friends and open his heart to love.

Ural falls in love with Homay and finds the bird

Homay joyfully meets Ural. Ural-Batyr does not recognize her. He asks to show him the way to the Living Spring. Homay asks to find an unusual bird, promising to give him the horse Akbuzat and a magic sword.

Ural goes in search of the unusual bird and finds it. She turns into a fish, then a bird, then a girl. This is Aihylu. She tells her story, promising the hero her horse Harisay (Yellow). Ural brings Aihilu to the palace of her father, King Samrau. Samrau sends Aihylu to her mother Ai (Moon, Selene) so that the divas do not find her.

Ural-Batyr recognizes the swan saved by him in the mistress of the palace. He asks Homay to fulfill his promise. Homay goes to his father. Padishah Samrau allows his daughter to give Ural the horse Akbuzat and the damask sword. He wants to marry Ural to his daughter Homay. She must give birth to a hero like the Urals. Samrau asks to release Schulgen on the occasion of the wedding of Ural and Homay.

==== Ural-Batyr and Shulgen meet ====
Ural is happy seeing his brother. Homay does not tell him that Shulgen came to the kingdom of Samrau with Zarkum and that he is friends with the divas. Shulgen intends to take away the winged horse, the magic sword and the Padishah's daughter, Homay, from Ural. At a festival hosted by Homay, men must show their strength. The Padishah's daughter will choose the winner as her husband.

==== Ural-Batyr and Shulgen compete on the Maidan ====
At the call of Homay, Akbuzat (the winged horse) descends from the sky. A damask sword is attached to his saddle. How beautiful is this unusual horse! Heroes must raise a huge stone, which Shulgen is unable to do. Ural-Batyr easily lifts the stone and throws it high into the sky. The stone was lost sight of until evening. Ural catches the stone just as easily and throws it strongly towards the kingdom of Azraka.

==== Schulgen regains his wife ====
Shulgen hates his brother deeply. Ural sees the misfortune of his elder brother, but does not know what is going on in his soul. Homay and Ural ask the padishah to give Aihylu to Shulgen as his wife. Aihylu falls from the sky to the ground like a ball of fire. The wedding continues.

Homay and Aihylu are endowed with the properties of peri – traditional female images in Turkic mythology.

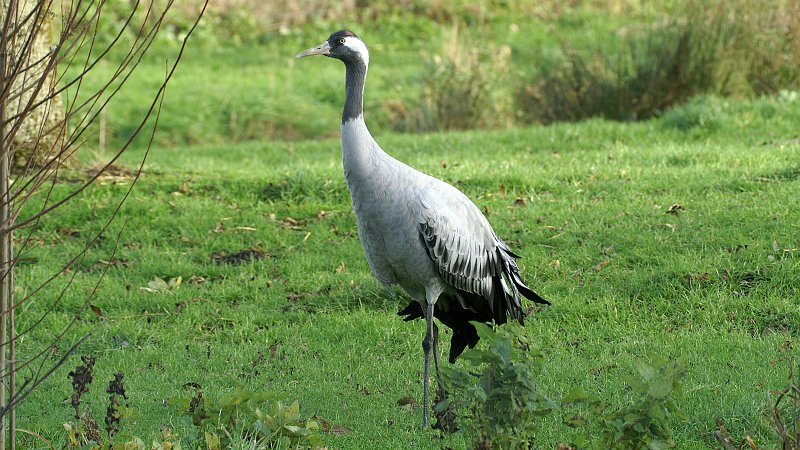
The crane (Aihylu) is a totem of the Bashkir people.

Ural entrusts his magic staff to Shulgen

Shulgen asks Ural to give him the magic staff, then striking the staff on the ground, disappears. Water pours from the bowls and floods everything around. Zarkum turns into a huge fish and swallows Homay. The sun (Homay's mother) ceases to shine without Homay. Akbuzat blocks the way to a turbulent stream, Zarkum releases Homay from his mouth. Ural-Batyr learns that his brother has become an enemy. The sun is shining again because Homay is saved.

==== Zarkum and Schulgen again at the padishah of divas ====
Schulgen and Zarkum return to the kingdom of Azraka. Azraka recognises his staff in Schulgen's hand and decides to return it. Azraka, Zarkum, Kahkaha, and Schulgen decide to start a war against Ural and Samrau.

From all sides divas attack the earth. There is water all around and the sky is completely aflame. Ural says goodbye to Homay, jumps on Akbuzat, picks up his magic sword and goes to war with the padishah of divas to save life on earth.

Ural-Batyr fights for a long time with the padishah of divas, Azraka. The faithful horse Akbuzat repeatedly saves the hero during the battle. Ural-Batyr strikes with a damask sword and cuts Azraka in two. Azraka screams and his body falls into the sea. At this point Mount Yaman-tau (the Terrible Mountain) grows. Where Ural rides, the water recedes, and a mountain rises. People who miraculously escaped during the flood begin to settle here.

==== Ural-batyr and his sons save people ====
For many years, Ural-Batyr fights with the divas. Their bodies became mountains. People try to establish life in these mountains, sticking out in the middle of the sea. Ural pursues the remaining divas, when suddenly a small detachment of eight people appears. One of the youths takes off his helmet and greets Ural-Batyr.

Young men call the names of their mothers. Ural-Batyr hugs his sons: Nugush (Gulistan's son), Yaik (son of the daughter of Katil), and Idel (son of Homay). With them was the son of Shulgen and Aihylu: Hakmar. The sons tell Ural how they learned about their father. Nugush destroys Zarkum himself, the son of the serpent king. Aihylu sends her son (riding on the horse Harysay) along with Idel. Ural is glad that he had assistants in the fight against Death and Evil.

==== The defeat of Kahkaha ====
Kahkaha ravages human dwellings for many years. No one can handle him. He learns about the death of Azraka and Zarkum. He decides to come out of the ground and find out what is happening. He believes that Ural died during the flood, but Ural-Batyr, together with his sons, attack Kahkaha and cut him to pieces. The heroes build a new mountain out of Kahkaha's body, dividing the sea into two parts.

Shulgen leads the army of divas and snakes. He has Kahkaha's magic staff in his hand. But Ural-Batyr dodges, hits the staff with a damask sword; the staff explodes and the magic sea immediately disappears. The divas hide in fright. Ural-Batyr seizes Shulgen and binds him. Hakmar (Shulgen's son) wants to chop off Shulgen's head, but the Urals do not allow him to.

==== The trial of Schulgen ====
Ural reminds him of how he disobeyed his father and his mother; he had drunk the blood of animals, despite the ban. Evil then settled in the heart of Schulgen; he began to be friends with snakes and divas and harm people, responding to Good with Evil. Shulgen asks for permission to wash his face in lake water. He asks Ural to forgive him again, promising to be a friend of the people. For the sake of his father and mother, Ural forgives Schulgen for the last time and let him go.

Everyone rejoices in victory. The Ural-Batyr invites everyone to defeat Death, collecting water from the Living Spring and distributing it. But an old man appears who had drunk water from the Living Spring and is forced to live forever. He is suffering greatly. The old man says that people do not need to drink living water; only Good can be eternal.

The great meaning of life is revealed to Ural. With one mighty sip of water he collects water from the Living Spring and does not drink it, but irrigates lifeless land. Suddenly everything turns green and flowers bloom. "May our land shine, may our country be worthy of love," says Ural-Batyr.

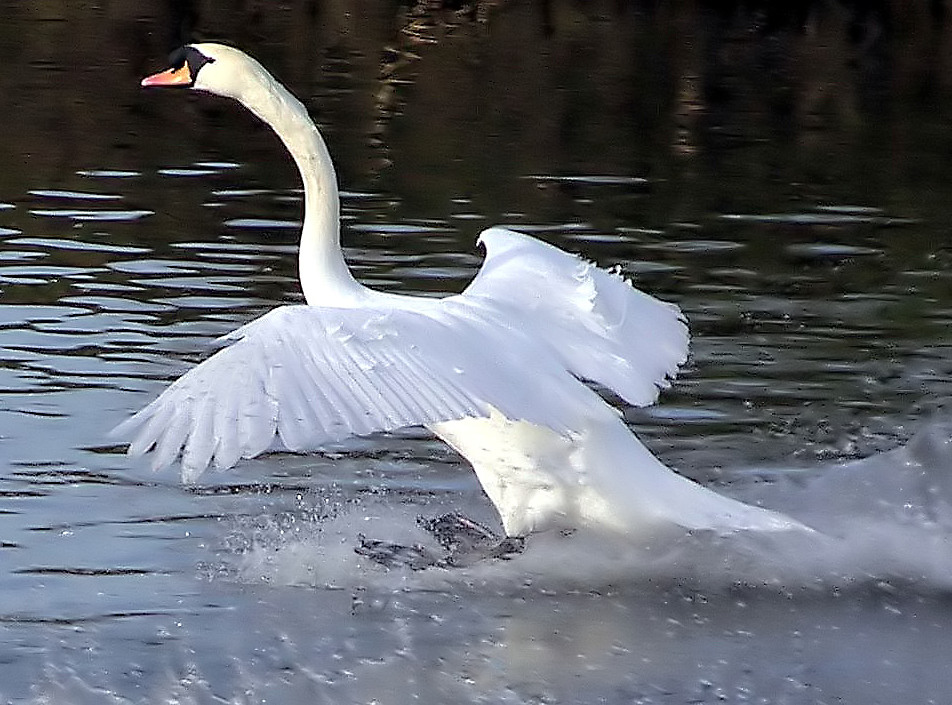
The swan (Homay) is a totem of the Bashkir people.

==== Schulgen's evil deeds begin again ====
Schulgen discovers there is no longer a Living Spring and decides to start harming people again. In the underworld, he begins to collect divas and kites under his own authority. People enjoy a happy life for a short time and begin to disappear again. Shulgen again goes against the people. Ural-Batyr decides to punish Shulgen and destroy all the divas. He drinks a lake in which divas hid. Together with water, he drinks all the snakes and divas that began to gnaw at his heart and liver. Ural spat out the lake, itself falling without strength. Divas are destroyed by the sons of Ural, but the hero's strength leaves him. Ural-Batyr feels his end is approaching. He advises his descendants not to take evil in fellow travelers, always take advice from elders and wise people, and to give advice to the youth and help them.

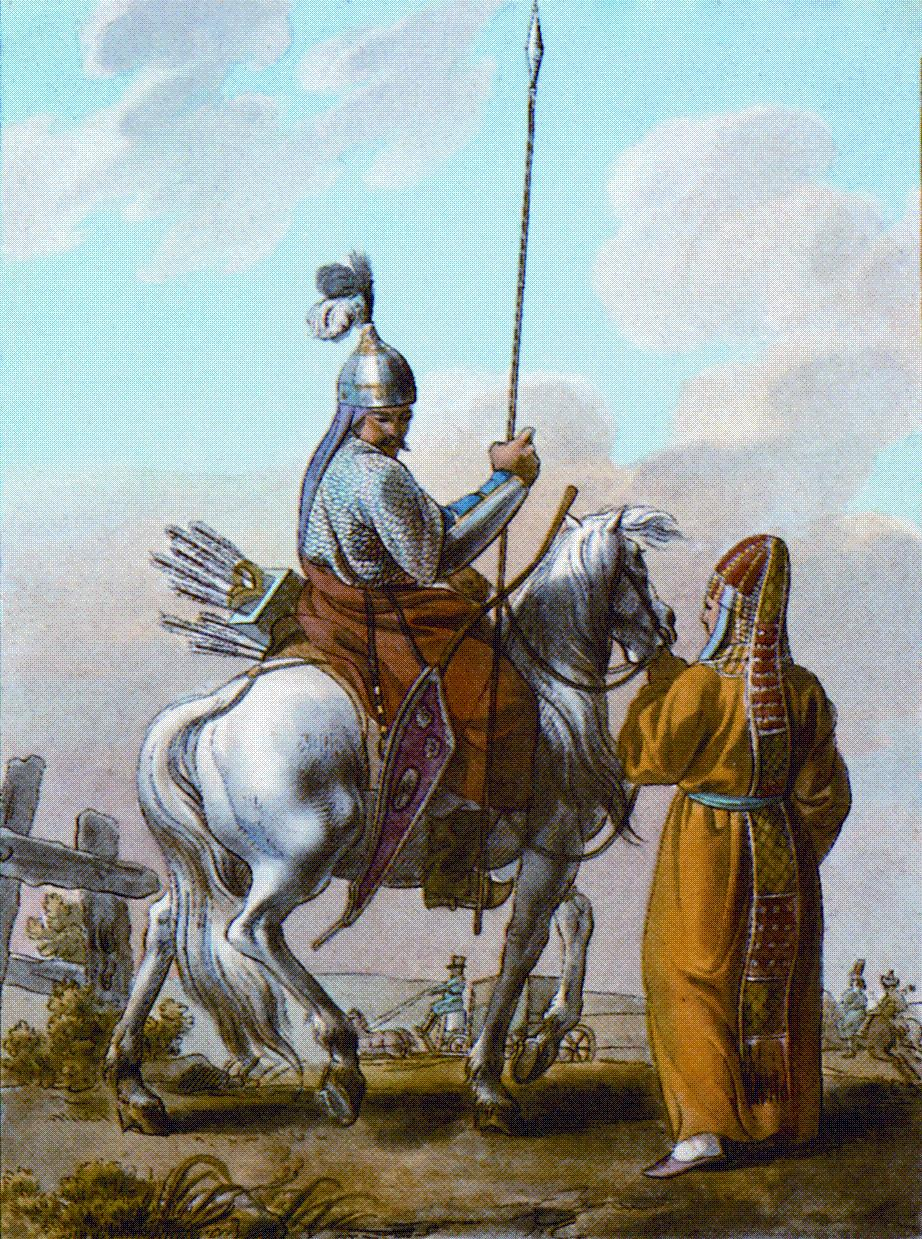
Bashkirs

"Do not shun Good, do not give in to Evil!" says Ural-Batyr and dies. At that moment, a star fell from the sky and Homay learns that her husband is no longer alive. She flies in the image of a swan to say goodbye to her beloved. Homay decides not to take off her bird outfit anymore; she promises to lay an egg every year, which will become a white bird.

=== Final part ===
==== Appearance of swans in the Urals ====
Many years later, Homay flies to the grave of Ural along with her chicks. People do not touch them. Russian researcher R. T. Ignatiev wrote that the Bashkirs believed: "To kill a Swan is a sin, and to kill a female swan is to cry your all life."

Katil led his herd to the Urals and submitted to people. Akbuzat leads herds of horses. And a glow appears on the grave of Ural-Batyr – the hero's ashes turn to gold. Since then, gold has appeared in the Urals.

==== Appearance of rivers in the Urals ====
In the Urals, people, animals and birds become very numerous. Remembering the prohibition of Ural-Batyr, they do not drink water from the lakes. And there is not enough spring water for everyone. Idel wants to find Schulgen and kill him. But Homay convinces him to find another way to help people. Idel hits the mountain with a magic sword and a spring is born (from Mount Iremel). A stream runs to the Yamantau mountain, which is cut by Idel into two parts. The gorge formed then began to be called Kyrykty. And the river that Idel obtained is called the river of Idel (Agidel). Yaik, Nugush and Hakmar set off to look for new rivers. People settle on the banks of four rivers, calling them the names of the batyrs. And their names remained unforgettable.

The hero died, but with him, divas, snakes and monsters died. A good deed committed by Ural-Batyr is immortal.

== English translation ==
The first full translation of Ural-batyr into the English language was made in 1999 by Sagit Shafikov, Professor of the Foreign Languages Department at Bashkir State University, Ufa, Russia. It appeared in the local journal called Vestnik Akademii Nauk ("Herald of Science Academy") and was followed by an improved version which appeared in 2001 in the Watandash ("Compatriot"). The final version was published alongside the original Bashkir text and the Russian translation in a glossy gift book Ural-batyr in 2003. In 2013 a new English language translation and retelling were done by David and Anastasia Andresen and published in the United States under the title "Ural the Brave."

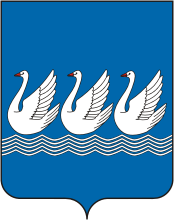

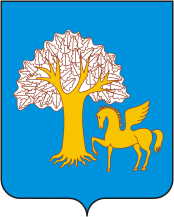

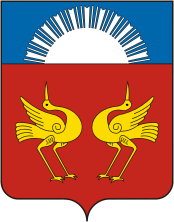

== External literature ==
- Das baschkirische Volksepos in der Ubersetzung von Alia Taissina mit Illustrationen von Rais Khalilov. Taschenbuch: 108 Seiten, Auflage: 1, Sprache: Deutsch, ISBN 3-939165-02-6, ISBN 978-3-939165-02-6
- Урал батыр. Башҡорт халыҡ ҡобайыры=Урал-батыр. Башкирский народный эпос=Ural‑batur. Bashkort Folk Epic. Ufa, 2005.
- Ergun M., Ibrahimov G. 1996: Baskurt Halk Destani Ural Batur. Ankara.
- Taissina А. 2006: «Ural-Batir. Das baschkirsche Volksepos». Germany.
