= Intervision Song Contest 1977 =

International song competition

Date and venue
- Final: 24–27 August 1977
- Venue: Forest Opera; Sopot, Poland

Organisation
- Organiser: International Radio and Television Organisation (OIRT)
- Host broadcaster: Telewizja Polska (TVP)
- Presenters: Irena Dziedzic; Marek Gaszyński; Jacek Bromski

Participants
- Number of entries: 20 entries (from 11 countries).
- Debuting countries: Cuba
- Participation map: frameless}} Participating countries

Vote
- Winning song: Czechoslovakia "Malovaný džbánku"

The Intervision Song Contest 1977 was the fifth edition of the Intervision Song Contest, held between the 24–27 August 1977 in the Forest Opera, in Sopot, Poland. It was hosted by Irena Dziedzic, Marek Gaszyński, and Jacek Bromski.

== Location ==
The Forest Opera is an open-air amphitheatre located in Sopot, Poland, with a capacity of 4,400 seats, the orchestra pit can contain up to 110 musicians. Each year, starting from 1964 (with some interruption in the early 1980s), the Sopot International Song Festival took place at the Forest Opera, events being organized by the Ministry of Culture and Art in cooperation with the Polish artistic agency Pagart. The Forest Opera played host to the fifth Intervision Song Contest, between 24 and 27 August 1977, replacing the 17th Sopot International Song Festival.

== Participants ==
The following entries participated in the 1977 edition of the contest:

Country	Broadcaster	Artist	Song	Language	English translation
Bulgaria	BNT	Biser Kirov	"W moim śnie"	Bulgarian	"In my dream"
Bulgaria	BNT	Biser Kirov	"Koniec lata"	Bulgarian	"The End of Summer"
Bulgaria	BNT	Lili Ivanova	"Khrizantemi"	Bulgarian	"Chrysanthemums"
Cuba	ICRT	Farah Maria	"El Recuerdo de Aquel Largo Viaje"	Spanish	"Memory of That Long Journey"
Cuba	ICRT	Farah Maria	"Un cuento"	Spanish	"A Tale"
Cuba	ICRT	Louis Pedro Ferrer	"Mi canto por la paz"	Spanish	"My song for peace"
Cuba	ICRT	Louis Pedro Ferrer	"Mariposa"	Spanish	"Butterflies"
Czechoslovakia	CST	Helena Vondráčková	"Lásko má já stůňu"	Czech	"I am ill my love"
Czechoslovakia	CST	Helena Vondráčková	"Malovaný džbánku"	Czech	"Painted jug"
Czechoslovakia	CST	Jiří Korn	"Jak se člověk mýlí"	Czech	"How wrong, man"
East Germany	DFF	Frank Schöbel	"O Lady"	German	"O Lady"
East Germany	DFF	Frank Schöbel	"Wenn du willst"	German	"If You Want"
East Germany	DFF	Kreis Group	"Doch ich wollt es wißen"	German	"But I wanted to know"
Finland	YLE	Kirka	"Neidonryöstö"	Finnish	"Maid abduction"
Finland	YLE	Kirka	"The Swallow"	English	–
Hungary	MTV	Kati és a Kerek Perec	"Egy dal neked"	Hungarian	"A song for you"
Hungary	MTV	Kati és a Kerek Perec	"Hinta"	Hungarian	"Swing"
Hungary	MTV	Kati Kovács	"Elégia"	Hungarian	"Elegy"
Hungary	MTV	Kati Kovács	"Ha legközelebb látlak"	Hungarian	"If I see you again"
Poland	TVP	Maryla Rodowicz	"Kolorowe jarmarki"	Polish	"Colorful fairs"
Poland	TVP	Czerwone Gitary	"Nie spoczniemy"	Polish	"We will not rest"
Poland	TVP	Czerwone Gitary	"Niebo z moich stron"	Polish	"Heaven from my side"
Romania	TVR	Olimpia Panciu & Angela	"Ţurai"	Romanian	"You're going"
Romania	TVR	Similea & Marius Țeicu	"Oamenii trebuie să se iubească"	Romanian	"People must love each other"
Romania	TVR	Angela Similea	"Nici tu, nici eu"	Romanian	"Neither You Nor I"
Soviet Union	CT USSR	Roza Rymbayeva	"Ozarenie"	Russian	"Insight"
Soviet Union	CT USSR	Roza Rymbayeva	"Stada"		"Herds"
Soviet Union	CT USSR	Vladimir Migulya and Roza Rymbayeva	"Ave Maria"	Latin	–
Soviet Union	CT USSR	Vladimir Migulya and Roza Rymbayeva	"Pobeda zhit"	Russian	"Victory live"
Spain	TVE	Nubes Grises	"Marinero"	Spanish	"Sailor"
Spain	TVE	Nubes Grises	"Nace el sentimiento"	Spanish	"The feeling is born"
Spain	TVE	José Vélez	"Romántica"	Spanish	"Romance"
Yugoslavia	JRT	Oliver Dragojević	"Majko, Da Li Znaš? "	Serbo-Croatian	"Mother, do you know?"

== Contest overview ==
R/O	Country	Artist	Song(s)	Points	Place
1	Hungary	Kati és a Kerek Perec	"Egy dal neked" "Hinta"	20	15
2	Soviet Union	Roza Rymbayeva	"Ozarenie" "Stada"	38	6
3	Bulgaria	Biser Kirov	"W moim śnie" "Koniec lata"	23	13
4	Cuba	Farah Maria	"El Recuerdo de Aquel Largo Viaje" "Un cuento"	150	2
5	Hungary	Kati Kovács	"Elégia" "Ha legközelebb látlak"	8	17
6	Spain	Nubes Grises	"Marinero" "Nace el sentimiento"	5	19
7	Czechoslovakia	Helena Vondráčková	"Lásko má já stůňu" "Malovaný džbánku"	174	1
8	Bulgaria	Lili Ivanova	"Khrizantemi"	112	4
9	Czechoslovakia	Jiří Korn	"Jak se člověk mýlí"	22	14
10	Finland	Kirka	"Neidonryöstö" "The Swallow"	18	16
11	Spain	José Vélez	"Romántica"	4	20
12	Yugoslavia	Oliver Dragojević	"Majko, Da Li Znaš? "	31	8
13	Cuba	Louis Pedro Ferrer	"Mi canto por la paz" "Mariposa"	36	7
14	East Germany	Frank Schöbel	"O Lady" "Wenn du willst"	39	5
15	East Germany	Kreis Group	"Doch ich wollt es wißen"	25	10
16	Poland	Maryla Rodowicz	"Kolorowe jarmarki"	24	11
17	Poland	Czerwone Gitary	"Nie spoczniemy" "Niebo z moich stron"	126	3
18	Romania	Olimpia Panciu & Angela; Similea & Marius Țeicu	"Ţurai" "Oamenii trebuie să se iubească"	27	9
19	Romania	Angela Similea	"Nici tu, nici eu"	7	18
20	Soviet Union	Vladimir Migulya and Roza Rymbayeva	"Ave Maria" "Pobeda zhit"	24	11

== Broadcasts ==
Known details on the broadcasts in each country, including the specific broadcasting stations and commentators are shown in the tables below.

Broadcasters and commentators in participating countries
Country	Broadcaster	Channel(s)	Ref(s)
East Germany	DFF	DFF1	
Poland	TP	TP1	
Soviet Union	CT USSR	Programme One	
