= Frida Öhrn =

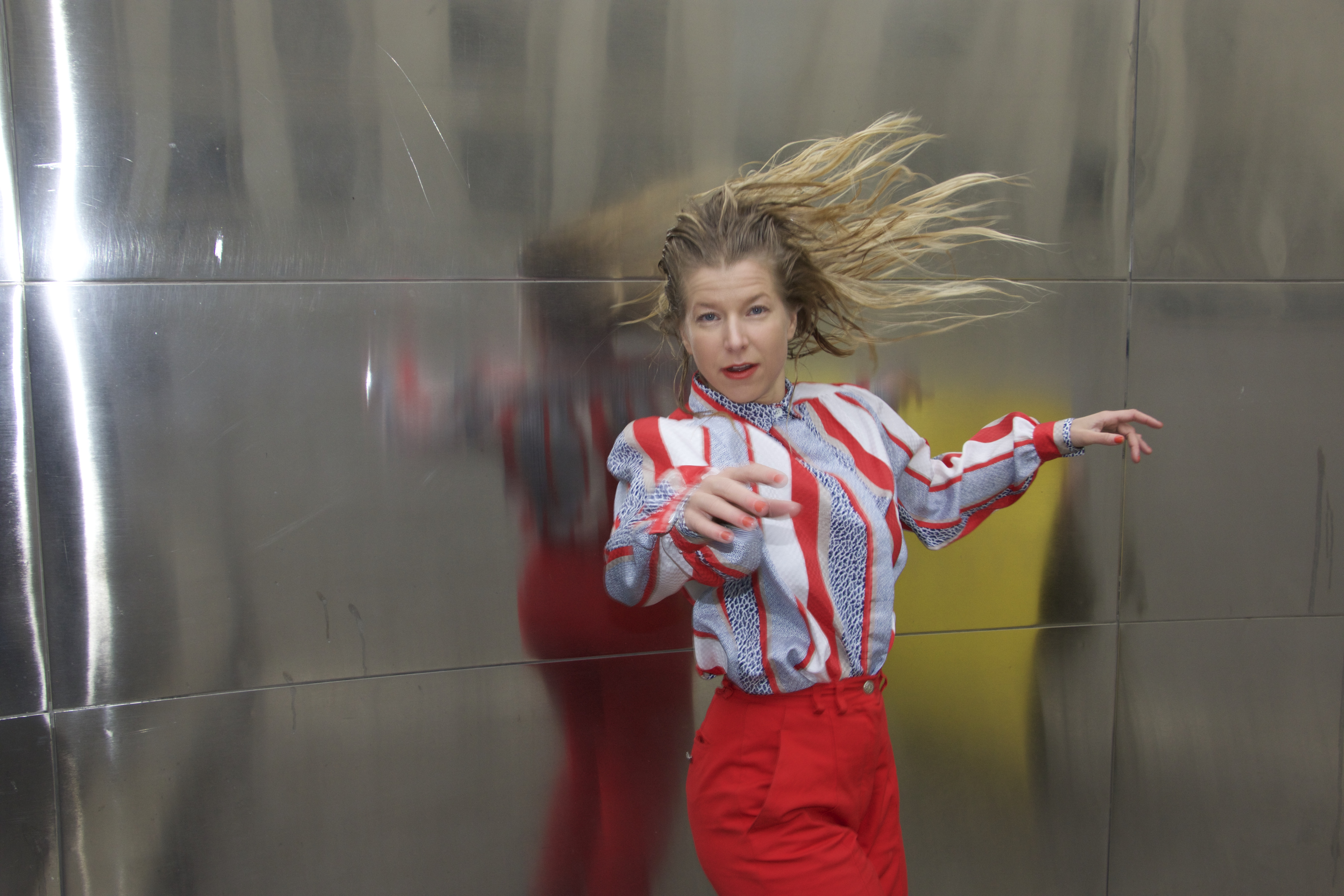
- Frida Öhrn from Öhrn

Background information
- Born: 24 February 1979 (age 47); Solna, Sweden
- Genres: Electronic, Pop, Country
- Occupations: singer; songwriter
- Instruments: Vocals, harmonica, guitar, piano

Frida Öhrn (born 24 February 1979) is a Swedish singer and songwriter. She was the singer of Indie-pop band Oh Laura with the worldwide hit "Release Me" in 2007, which was featured in a TV commercial for Saab Automobile.

She has also been a part of the country trio Cookies 'N' Beans, performing in the Swedish Melodifestivalen (Eurovision Song Contest qualifier) in 2009 with "What If" and in 2013 with "Burning Flags". She is also known for several well-received collaborations with a variety of Swedish musicians, where she performs mainly in Swedish, including the charting album Den lyckliges väg. With Bo Sundström. In 2016, she started her own record label Eaglebrain and released her first solo material.

== Discography ==
=== Singles ===
Title	Year	Peak chart positions	Album
Title	Year	SWE Heat.	Album
"We Are One"	2020	6	Non-album single
