= Ferdinand I =

Ferdinand I or Fernando I may refer to:

== People ==
- Ferdinand I of León, the Great (c. 1000–1065, king from 1037)
- Ferdinand I of Portugal and the Algarve, the Handsome (1345–1383, king from 1367)
- Ferdinand I of Aragon and Sicily, of Antequera (1379–1416, king from 1412)
- Fernando I, Duke of Braganza (1403–1478)
- Ferdinand I of Naples (c. 1424–1494, king from 1458)
- Ferdinand I, Holy Roman Emperor (1503–1564, king of Hungary and Bohemia from 1526, emperor from 1556)
- Ferdinando I de' Medici, Grand Duke of Tuscany (1549–1609, grand-duke from 1604)
- Ferdinand, Duke of Mantua and Montferrat (1587–1626)
- Azim ud-Din I of Sulu, briefly converted to Christianity under the name Ferdinand I (r. 1735–1748 and 1764–1774)
- Ferdinand I, Duke of Parma, Piacenza and Guastalla (1751–1802, duke from 1765)
- Ferdinand I of the Two Sicilies (1751–1825, king of Naples and Sicily from 1759, king of the Two Sicilies from 1816)
- Ferdinand I of Austria (1793–1875, emperor 1835–1848)
- Ferdinand I of Bulgaria (1861–1948, prince 1887–1908, tsar 1908–1918)
- Ferdinand I of Romania (1865–1927, king from 1914)

== Places ==
- Ferdinand I or Regele Ferdinand, the former name of two Romanian communes:
  - Mihail Kogălniceanu, Constanța
  - 1 Decembrie, Ilfov County
