= Armenian Dance Sport Federation =

Sports organization of Armenia

- Abbreviation: ADSF
- Established: 1996
- Headquarters: Yerevan, Armenia
- President: Georgi Babayan
- Website: Armenian Dance Sport Federation

The Armenian Dance Sport Federation (ADSF) (Armenian: Հայաստանի պարային սպորտի ֆեդերացիա, romanized: Hayastani parayin sporti federats’ia), also known as the Sports Dance Federation of Armenia, is the regulating body of dancesport in Armenia. The headquarters of the federation is located in Yerevan. It is led by president Georgi Babayan.

== History ==
The Armenian Dance Sport Federation was founded in 1996. The ADSF is a full member of the World DanceSport Federation (WDSF), DanceSport Europe, and the World Rock'n'Roll Confederation. Since 2001, the Federation has hosted numerous WDSF competitions including the 2008 East European Championships, the 2019 U21 Dance World Champions, and the 2022 European Cup. The federation trains dancers and dance couples in European and Latin dance, Armenian folk dance, modern, contemporary and hip hop dance and organizes their participation in World, European, and other regional dance competitions such as Vivat Russia!. The federation also cooperates with other dance clubs across Armenia.

The World Youth Latin American Dance Championships have been held in Armenia four times with the assistance of the ADSF. The latest Latin dance competition was held in Yerevan on 12 November 2023 and consisted of dance couples from 33 countries.

The ADSF hosted the World Rock'n'Roll Confederation's 2023 acrobatic rock and roll World Cup.

== See also ==
- Armenian dance
- Sport in Armenia
