= Five Stars: Intervision =

International song competition

Five Stars: Intervision 2008

Date and venue
- Final: 28–31 August 2008
- Venue: Festivalny; Sochi, Russia

Organisation
- Host broadcaster: Channel One
- Presenters: Aleksandr Tsekalo; Anna Sedokova; Dmitry Shepelev; Aleksandra Saveleva

Participants
- Number of entries: 11
- Debuting countries: Armenia; Azerbaijan; Belarus; Kazakhstan; Kyrgyzstan; Latvia; Moldova; Russia; Tajikistan; Turkmenistan; Ukraine

Five Stars: Intervision (Russian: Пять звёзд. Интервидение), also known as the Intervision Song Contest 2008, was an international song competition that took place at Festivalny concert hall in Sochi, Russia. Eligible countries that competed in the contest were from the Commonwealth of Independent States, the Shanghai Cooperation Organisation, and former Soviet Republics. Although it takes the name from the former Intervision Song Contest, and it was announced as a revival of it; it has a different organiser, format, and set of participating countries than the original contests; as well as from "Intervision 2025".

Eleven countries confirmed their participation in the contest.

== Location ==
Five Stars: Intervision took place in the coastal Russian city of Sochi.

== Participants ==
=== Night 1 – Original Song ===
The first night saw the 11 participants performing an original song sung either in Russian or their national language. The running order was as follows:

Draw	Country	Language	Artist	Song	English translation	Points	Place
1	Tajikistan	Tajik	Tahmina Niyazova	"Zangi Telefon" (Занги телефон)	Telephone Ring	79	2
2	Turkmenistan	Turkmen	Lachin Mamedova	"Kushdepdi"	It was cold	43	7
3	Moldova	Russian	Boris Covali	"Budesh Zvat" (Будешь звать)	Will call	23	9
4	Ukraine	Russian	The Dangerous Liaisons	"Podarki" (Подарки)	Gifts	59	4
5	Latvia	Latvian	Amber	"Saucu Tevi"	I call you	40	8
6	Azerbaijan	Russian	Seyran	"Uletat" (Улетаю)	Fly away	45	6
7	Belarus	Russian	The Champions	"Ya Begu Na Zemle" (Я бегу по земле)	I’m running on the ground	52	5
8	Armenia	Russian	Razmik Amyan	"Ty Budesh Moyey" (Ты будешь моей)	You will be mine	70	3
9	Russia	Russian	Kvatro	"Romans" (Романс)	Romance	81	1
10	Kazakhstan	Russian	Almas Kishkenbaev	"Lyubimaya" (Любимая)	Beloved	79	2
11	Kyrgyzstan	Kyrgyz	Gulzinat Suranchieva	"Kir kerbez"	It's dirty	70	3

=== Night 2 – Retro Hit ===
The second night saw the 11 participants perform hits from the 20th Century and were performed in Russian. The running order was as follows:

Draw	Country	Language	Artist	Song	English translation	Points	Place
1	Kazakhstan	Russian	Almas Kishkenbaev	"Ne Nado Pechalitsya" (Не надо печалиться)	Do not be sad	58	5
2	Azerbaijan	Russian	Seyran	"Pozvoni" (Позвони)	Call	55	6
3	Belarus	Russian	The Champions	"Tam, Gde Klen Shumit" (Там, где клен шумит)	Where the maple rustles	50	7
4	Russia	Russian	Kvatro	"Skazhite, Devushki, Podruzhke Vashey" (Скажите, девушки, подружке вашей)	Tell me, girl, your girlfriend	70	1
5	Kyrgyzstan	Russian	Gulzinat Suranchieva	"Molba" (Мольба)	Plea	68	3
6	Ukraine	Russian	The Dangerous Liaisons	"Moya Zemlya" (Моя земля)	My land	60	4
7	Latvia	Russian	Amber	"O, sudba"	Oh fate	45	9
8	Tajikistan	Russian	Tahmina Niyazova	"Tsvety Pod Snegom" (Цветы под снегом)	Flowers in the snow	68	3
9	Turkmenistan	Russian	Lachin Mamedova	"Nezhnost" (Нежность)	Tenderness	45	9
10	Armenia	Russian	Razmik Amyan	"Dorogoy Dlinnoyu" (Дорогой длинною)	The Long Road	69	2
11	Moldova	Russian	Boris Covali	"Melankoliye" (Меланколие)	Melankolie	49	8

=== Night 3 – World Hit ===
The third competitive night of the contest saw the participants performing world hits in the original language of the song. These songs were to be the most suitable for your image. The running order was as follows:

Draw	Country	Language	Artist	Song	English translation	Points	Place
1	Moldova	English	Boris Covali	"The Great Pretender"	—	52	6
2	Armenia	Russian	Razmik Amyan	"Pamyati Karuzo" (Памяти Карузо)	Caruso	60	3
3	Russia	Spanish	Kvatro	"Sola Otra Vez"	Alone again	64	2
4	Azerbaijan	Azerbaijani	Seyran	"Shimarik"		50	8
5	Latvia	French	Amber	"Milord"	—	57	4
6	Tajikistan	English	Tahmina Niyazova	"Hero"	—	69	1
7	Ukraine	English	The Dangerous Liaisons	"My Number One"	—	55	5
8	Kazakhstan	English	Almas Kishkenbaev	"Sorry Seems to Be the Hardest Word"	—	52	6
9	Kyrgyzstan	English	Gulzinat Suranchieva	"La Isla Bonita"	The beautiful island	57	4
10	Belarus	English	The Champions	"I Like to Move It"	—	51	7
11	Turkmenistan	Arabic	Lachin Mamedova	"Habiby"	My darling	52	6

=== Night 4 – Gala Night ===
On the Gala Night performers from across the competing nations performed on stage with their hits, performers included Philip Kirkov, Irina Allegrova and others. The night culminated in the announcement of the results.

This meant the final scoreboard results were:

Winner
Second place
Third place

Place	Country	Points
1	Tajikistan	216
2	Russia	215
3	Armenia	199
4	Kyrgyzstan	195
5	Kazakhstan	189
6	Ukraine	174
7	Belarus	153
8	Azerbaijan	150
9	Latvia	142
10	Turkmenistan	141
11	Moldova	124

=== Other awards ===
Also there were other awards presented for different countries such as:

Award	Country
Grand Prix	Tajikistan
First Prize	Armenia; Russia
Second Prize	Kazakhstan; Latvia; Ukraine
Third Prize	Belarus; Moldova; Turkmenistan
Press award	Russia
Debut Intervision	Tajikistan
Miss Intervision	Turkmenistan
Prize of the City of Sochi	Kyrgyzstan
Prize for Stylishness	Latvia
CIS Special Prize Fund	Azerbaijan

== Other countries ==
The contest was open to members of the Commonwealth of Independent States, the Shanghai Co-operation Organisation and other Central Asian countries.

- Georgia – Georgia was meant to debut at the 2008 contest but withdrew in June 2008 due to the Russo-Georgian War earlier that year. Despite this the organizing committee stated that they would welcome Georgia’s participation. If Georgia went on to participate they would have been represented by Salome Korkotashvili.
- Uzbekistan – Uzbekistan was meant to debut at the 2008 contest but withdrew a couple of days before the contest for unknown reasons. They were really slow at selecting their participant but a week before the contest they selected Shakhnoza Usmanhodzhaeva who would have represented them under the stage name of "Anor". But later it was announced that they would not compete.
