= Intervision Song Contest =

International song competition

- Genre: Music competition
- Created by: International Radio and Television Organisation
- No. of episodes: 10 contests

Production
- Production locations: Prague (1965); Bratislava (1966–1967); Karlovy Vary (1968); Sopot (1977–1980); Sochi (2008); Moscow (2025); Riyadh (2026)
- Production companies: International Radio and Television Organisation; 1965–68: Czechoslovak Television; 1977–80: Telewizja Polska

Original release
- Release: 12 June 1965 – 22 June 1968
- Release: 24 August 1977 – 23 August 1980
- Release: 28 August – 31 August 2008
- Release: 20 September 2025

Related
- Sopot International Song Festival

The Intervision Song Contest (ISC) is an international song competition originally organised by the International Radio and Television Organisation (OIRT) and broadcast live via the Intervision network. Launched in 1965 as the Eastern Bloc equivalent to the Eurovision Song Contest, its first phase was staged in various cities across Czechoslovakia until 1968. From 1977 to 1980, the contest was held at Sopot's Forest Opera in Poland, followed by a one-off revival in Sochi in 2008. After a lengthy hiatus, the contest was relaunched in 2025 under an annual rotating-host model, with each edition staged in a different country.

The ISC replaced the long-running Sopot International Song Festival (Sopot ISF), which had been held in Sopot since 1961, when it moved there for its second phase from 1977 to 1980. In 1981 the unified ISC/Sopot ISF was cancelled because of the rise of the independent trade union movement, Solidarity, which was judged by other Eastern bloc communist governments to be "counter-revolutionary". In 1984, Polish broadcaster TVP revived the Sopot ISF under its original name.

In 2008, a one-off revival contest took place in Sochi, as an attempt to revive the contest, though subsequent editions planned in both 2014 and 2015 did not materialise. After the Russian broadcasters withdrew from the European Broadcasting Union upon being excluded from the Eurovision Song Contest 2022, another revival was announced by the Russian Ministry of Culture in 2023, with Russian president Vladimir Putin signing a decree for it to be held in Moscow. Intervision 2025 was held on 20 September at the Live Arena in Novoivanovskoye, Moscow. The next edition was scheduled to be held in Riyadh, Saudi Arabia in 2026, but the Iran war has called it into question.

== History ==
=== 1965–1968: Golden Clef Intervision Contest ===
The first series of Intervision Song Contest, officially called Golden Clef Intervision Contest (Czech: Zlatý klíč Intervize) ran from 1965 to 1968 in Czechoslovakia. The inaugural contest was held at the Musical Theatre Karlín in Prague, with subsequent editions held in Bratislava and Karlovy Vary. After 1968, the Intervision Song Contest didn't take place because of Prague Spring of 1968.

=== 1977–1980: Sopot ===
The first Sopot International Song Festival was initiated and organised in 1961 by Władysław Szpilman, assisted by Szymon Zakrzewski from Polish Artists Management (PAGART). The first three editions were held in the Shipyard hall of Gdańsk (1961–1963), after which the festival moved to the Forest Opera in Sopot. The main prize has been Amber Nightingale for most of its history.

Between 1977 and 1980 the Sopot International Song Festival was replaced by the Intervision Song Contest, which was still held in the same venue. Unlike the Eurovision Song Contest, the Sopot International Music Festival often changed its formulas to pick a winner and offered many different contests for its participants. For example, at the 1980 contest two competitions were organised: one for artists representing television companies, the other for those representing record companies. In the first competition, the jury considered the artistic merits of the songs entered, while in the second, it judged the performers' interpretation. The festival has always been open to non-European acts, and countries like Cuba, the Dominican Republic, Mongolia, New Zealand, Nigeria, Peru, South Africa, and many others have been represented in the event.

In 1980, the contest took place alongside with beginning of the Solidarity movement. The next year, martial law was introduced in Poland. The Sopot Festival returned in 1984 with its old name.

The festival lost popularity in Poland and abroad in the 1980s. Telewizja Polska (TVP)'s unconvincing attempts at organising several of the contests led to the authorities of Sopot giving the organisation of the 2005 festival to a private broadcaster, TVN. Since 1999, there had been no competition. TVP chose to invite well-known artists instead, featuring the likes of Whitney Houston or The Corrs. In 2005, TVN was expected to bring the competition back. In 2006 TVN invited Elton John. In 2010 and 2011, the festival did not take place due to renovation of the Forest Opera. Since 2012, it has been called Sopot Top of the Top Festival and is broadcast annually by Polsat. The festival also provided opportunity to listen to international stars. It featured Charles Aznavour, Boney M, Johnny Cash, and more recently: Chuck Berry, Vanessa Mae, Annie Lennox, Vaya Con Dios, Chris Rea, Tanita Tikaram, La Toya Jackson, Whitney Houston, Kajagoogoo, as well as Goran Bregovic and Anastacia.

=== 2008: Five Stars - Intervision ===
In 2008, Five Stars: Intervision was organised where eleven countries participated and was won by Tajikistan. In 2009, the then Prime Minister of Russia, Vladimir Putin, proposed restarting the competition, this time between Russia, China and the Central Asian member states of the Shanghai Cooperation Organisation.

In May 2014, it was announced that the contest would return, featuring countries from the Commonwealth of Independent States and the Shanghai Cooperation Organisation. Russian singer and producer Igor Matvienko, announced that the contest would take place in October 2014 in the coastal city of Sochi, which played host to the 2014 Winter Olympics. Seven countries had declared their interest to compete prior to the event's cancellation: Kazakhstan, Kyrgyzstan, Russia, Tajikistan, Turkmenistan, China, and Uzbekistan. Russia had also selected Alexander Ivanov as its representative. The contest was scheduled to take place in October 2014, ostensibly due to "Russian anger at the moral decay of the West", particularly in response to the Eurovision Song Contest 2014 winner Conchita Wurst. Moreover, the revival was seen as part of "Putin's broader cultural diplomacy agenda". Despite plans to stage the contest in both 2014 and 2015, a revival has not taken place. Ivanov later represented Belarus in the Eurovision Song Contest 2016 with the song "Help You Fly", but failed to qualify for the final.

=== 2025–present ===
In November 2023, Russian Minister of Culture Olga Lyubimova and Channel One Russia's Director General Konstantin Ernst revealed at St. Petersburg's International Cultural Forum that the broadcaster planned to produce a revival of the Intervision Song Contest featuring the member countries of BRICS. This occurred after the broadcaster's membership in the European Broadcasting Union was suspended, upon the exclusion of Russia from the Eurovision Song Contest 2022 due to its invasion of Ukraine. On 8 June 2024, Russian government official Mikhail Shvydkoy told RIA Novosti that "more than 16 countries" would take part in the competition, naming Azerbaijan, Belarus, Brazil, China, Cuba, and Kazakhstan.

On 3 February 2025, president Putin signed a decree formalising the revival of the competition. Intervision 2025 was held in the Moscow area on 20 September 2025. Deputy Prime Minister Dmitry Chernyshenko was appointed as chair of the event's organizing committee, while domestic policy chief Sergey Kiriyenko was installed as chair of its supervisory board. 23 countries competed in the event, which was won by Vietnam. The next edition was planned to be held in Riyadh, Saudi Arabia in 2026, organised by the country's culture ministry, but the Iran war called it into question. It was later confirmed that the contest would not be held in 2026, with a possibility of postponement to 2027 being considered. Prior to the cancelation, four countries had confirmed participation: Belarus, Brazil, Russia, and Saudi Arabia.

== Winners ==
Year	Date	Host City	Winner			
Year	Date	Host City	Country	Song	Artist	Language
1965–1968: Golden Clef Intervision Contest
1965	12 June	(Czechoslovakia) Prague	Czechoslovakia	"Tam, kam chodí vítr spát"	Karel Gott	Czech
1966	25 June	(Czechoslovakia) Bratislava	Bulgaria	"Adagio" (Адажио)	Lili Ivanova	Bulgarian
1967	17 June	(Czechoslovakia) Bratislava	Czechoslovakia	"Rekviem"	Eva Pilarová	Czech
1968	22 June	(Czechoslovakia) Karlovy Vary	Czechoslovakia	"Proč ptáci zpívají?"	Karel Gott	Czech
1977–1980: Sopot
1977	24–27 August	(Poland) Sopot	Czechoslovakia	"Malovaný džbánku"	Helena Vondráčková	Czech
1978	23–26 August	(Poland) Sopot	Czechoslovakia	"Patrik"	Václav Neckář	Czech
1978	23–26 August	(Poland) Sopot	Soviet Union	"Vsyo mogut koroli" (Всё могут короли)	Alla Pugacheva	Russian
1979	22–25 August	(Poland) Sopot	Poland	"Nim przyjdzie wiosna"	Czesław Niemen	Polish
1980	20–23 August	(Poland) Sopot	Czechoslovakia	"Chcem sa s tebou deliť"	Marika Gombitová	Slovak
1980	20–23 August	(Poland) Sopot	Finland	"Hyvästi yö"	Marion Rung	Finnish
1980	20–23 August	(Poland) Sopot	Soviet Union	"Na vstrechu oseni" (На встречу осени)	Mykola Hnatyuk	Russian
2008: Five Stars - Intervision
2008	28–31 August	(Russia) Sochi	Tajikistan	''Zangi Telefon'' "Tsvety Pod Snegom" "Hero"	Tahmina Niyazova	English
2025
2025	20 September	(Russia) Moscow	Vietnam	"Phù Đổng Thiên Vương"	Đức Phúc	Vietnamese, English, Russian

=== Winners by country ===
Wins	Country	Years
6	Czechoslovakia	1965, 1967, 1968, 1977, 1978, 1980
2	Soviet Union	1978, 1980
1	Bulgaria	1966
1	Poland	1979
1	Finland	1980
1	Tajikistan	2008
1	Vietnam	2025

=== Winners by language ===
Wins	Language	Years
5	Czech	1965, 1967, 1968, 1977, 1978
4	Russian	1978, 1980, 2008, 2025
2	English	2008, 2025
1	Bulgarian	1966
1	Polish	1979
1	Finnish	1980
1	Slovak	1980
1	Vietnamese	2025

== Participation ==
Countries that have participated in the contest:

Country	Broadcaster(s)	Debut year	Latest entry	Years	Entries	Best placement		Wins
Country	Broadcaster(s)	Debut year	Latest entry	Years	Entries	Pos	Latest (Note: Most recent year in which the country obtained this position.)	Wins
Armenia †	AMPTV	2008		1	3	3rd	2008	0
Azerbaijan †	İTV	2008		1	3	8th	2008	0
Belarus	Belteleradio	2008	2025	2	4	6th	2025	0
Belgium^{[a]} †	BRT (Flemish); RTBF (Wallon)	1968	1979	2	2	10th	1979	0
Brazil	MinC	2025		1	1	21st	2025	0
Bulgaria †	BNT	1968	1980	5	6	1st	1966	1
Canada †	CBC	1978		1	1	6th	1978	0
China	—	2025		1	1	9th	2025	0
Colombia	RTVC	2025		1	1	4th	2025	0
Cuba	ICRT	1977	2025	4	5	2nd	1977	0
Egypt	TEN TV	2025		1	1	20th	2025	0
Ethiopia	Balageru TV	2025		1	1	19th	2025	0
Finland †	YLE	1966	1980	7	7	1st	1980	1
Hungary †	MTV	1965	1980	7	8	3rd	1979	0
India	ITV Network	2025		1	1	12th	2025	0
Kazakhstan	ATV	2008	2025	2	4	5th	2008	0
Kenya	—	2025		1	1	18th	2025	0
Kyrgyzstan	KTRK	2008	2025	2	4	2nd	2025	0
Latvia †	LTV	2008		1	3	9th	2008	0
Madagascar	Real TV Madagasikara	2025		1	1	8th	2025	0
Moldova †	TRM	2008		1	3	11th	2008	0
Morocco †	SNRT	1979		1	1	7th	1979	0
Netherlands †	NOS	1980		1	1	4th	1980	0
Poland †	TVP	1965	1980	8	10	1st	1979	1
Portugal †	RTP	1979		1	1	12th	1979	0
Qatar	QMC	2025		1	1	3rd	2025	0
Romania †	TVR	1968	1980	5	6	3rd	1980	0
Russia	Channel One	2008	2025	2	4	2nd	2008	0
Saudi Arabia	MOCSA	2025		1	1	17th	2025	0
Serbia	—	2025		1	1	14th	2025	0
South Africa	SABC	2025		1	1	15th	2025	0
Spain †	TVE	1968	1980	5	6	2nd	1980	0
Switzerland †	SRG SSR	1968	1980	2	2	6th	1980	0
Tajikistan	TV Safina	2008	2025	2	4	1st	2008	1
Turkmenistan †	TTV	2008		1	3	10th	2008	0
United Arab Emirates	ADMN	2025		1	1	16th	2025	0
United States	—	~~2025~~		—	—	—	—	—
Ukraine †	NTSU	2008		1	3	6th	2008	0
Uzbekistan	Zo'r TV	2025		1	1	10th	2025	0
Venezuela	TVes	2025		1	1	13th	2025	0
Vietnam	VTV	2025		1	1	1st	2025	1
Czechoslovakia ‡	CST	1965	1980	8	10	1st	1980	6
East Germany ‡	DFF	1965	1980	8	11	2nd	1978	0
Soviet Union ‡	CT USSR	1965	1980	8	10	1st	1980	2
Yugoslavia ‡	JRT	1965	1980	6	7	2nd	1968	0

Table key
†	Inactive – countries which participated in the past but did not appear in the most recent contest, or will not appear in the upcoming contest
—	Withdrawn – countries that were about to participate in the contest, but never did.
‡	Former – countries which previously participated but no longer exist

Participation since 1977: Entered at least once Never entered, although invited to do so Entry intended but withdrew

=== Invited ===
Countries that expressed interest, were invited, or even "confirmed" by the organisers, but ended up not participating:

- Bolivia
- Iran
- Mexico
- North Korea
- Pakistan
- Slovakia
- Thailand
