= Martin Halla =

Norwegian singer (born 1988)

Martin Halla (born 4 June 1988 in Aurskog, Norway) is a Norwegian singer who, on 25 May 2012, won the inaugural series of The Voice – Norges beste stemme, the Norwegian version of The Voice in 2012 and was broadcast on TV2. He was part of "Team Magne" as he was mentored by Magne Furuholmen.

== Career ==
The Voice – Norges beste stemme

In his audition, broadcast on 27 January 2012, Halla residing in Bergen, Norway sang "Somewhere Only We Know" from Keane with two judges Sondre Lerche and Magne Furuholmenhitting the "I Want U" button. He chose to be on Magne's team. On 6 April 2012, in the Battle round, his mentor paired him against contestant Ruben Gundersen also from "Team Magne" and chose to keep Halla after they both sang "Keep On Walking" from Salem Al Fakir.

In the sing-off round, where each coach would nominates 4 acts from the group to advance to the live shows with the 3 remaining acts per group being subjected to the sing-off for the sole remaining spot, Halla was spared the round and advanced to the next round by decision of his mentor.

In the semi-finals he sang "Release Me" from Oh Laura and advanced to the final as the finalist of Team Magne where he faced Aleksander Walmann Åsgården (Team Sondre), Hege Øversveen from Team Hanne and Leif Anders Wentzel of Team Team Yosef. Halla sang "We Found Love" from Rihanna and his winning song "Take It With Me".

Solo

After the win on 25 May 2012 the winning song "Take It With Me" was released as Martin Halla's debut single hitting #3 of VG-lista the official Norwegian Singles Chart on its first week of release. His semi-final rendition "Release Me" also peaked at number 7.

In 2013, Martin Halla released his debut album Winter Days that reached number 5 in the Norwegian Albums Chart.

== Discography ==
=== Albums ===
Year	Album	Peak chart positions	Certification
Year	Album	NOR	Certification
2013	Winter Days	5	

=== Singles ===
Year	Single	Peak chart positions	Album
Year	Single	NOR	Album
2012	"Release Me"	7	Non-album release during competition
2012	"Take It With Me"	3	TBA
2013	"Illuminate the Sky"	19	TBA

Awards and achievements
Preceded by N/A	The Voice – Norges beste stemme Winner; 2012	Succeeded by Knut Marius
