= A Song Inside My Head, a Demon in My Bed =

Studio album by Oh Laura
- Released: 23 May 2007
- Genres: Country, indiepop
- Length: 39 minutes
- Label: Cosmos
- Producers: Henrik Edenhed, Joakim Olavsson, Olle Olsson

Oh Laura chronology
A Song Inside My Head, a Demon in My Bed (2007)	The Mess We Left Behindtill (2012)

A Song Inside My Head, a Demon in My Bed is a studio album by Oh Laura, released on 23 May 2007.

== Track listing ==
1. A Call to Arms
2. It Ain't Enough
3. Release Me
4. Black N' Blue
5. Fine Line
6. Raining in New York
7. Out of Bounds
8. Thunderbird Motel
9. The Mess You Left Behind
10. Killer on the Road
11. Friend Like Me

== Charts ==
=== Weekly charts ===
Chart (2007–2008)	Peak position
Swedish Albums (Sverigetopplistan)	3

=== Year-end charts ===
Chart (2007)	Position
Swedish Albums (Sverigetopplistan)	46
Chart (2008)	Position
Swedish Albums (Sverigetopplistan)	87
