= Tahmina Niyazova =

Tajikistani singer (born 1989)

Tahmina Niyazova Таҳмина Ниёзова
- Niyazova in 2017

Background information
- Born: 14 February 1989 (age 37); Dushanbe, Tajikistan
- Genre: Pop
- Occupation: Singer
- Years active: 2003-present

Tahmina Niyazova (Tajik: Таҳмина Ниёзова; born 14 February 1989, in Dushanbe, USSR) is a Tajikistani singer. In 2008, she took first place in the international Russian-language Five Stars Intervision (Pyat' zvyozd Intervidinie) music contest.

In 2003, at the age of 14 years, Tahmina Niyazova became the youngest winner of a competition in Tajikistan entitled ‘Stars of the New Century’. She participated in several local festivals, winning top prizes over the next several years, including ‘Best Song’ and ‘Song of the Year’ (Surudi sol) during 2007. She garnered 216 points during the ‘Five Stars’ competition, beating by one point her nearest competitor to win the event, receiving also an award for being the youngest participant. Tahmina Niyazova represented Tajikistan in 2009 at the Festival of Youth in the Commonwealth of Independent States in Baku, Azerbaijan.

In 2012, Tahmina represented her home country Tajikistan at the International Music Festival "Suncane Skale" in Montenegro where she finished 5th with her song "Boom Boom Boom". The music video for her single "Boom Boom Boom" was also shot in Montenegro and was directed by Macedonian video Producer Dario Jankovic.

Tahmina comes from a noted musical family in Tajikistan, the most famous member of which was her grandfather, Boymuhammad Niyozov (Боймухаммад Ниёзов) (1927–2009), the late Tajik classical musician.

== Songs ==
- ‘Zangi telefon’ («Занги телефон»)
- ‘Hero’
- 'Ti tolko pozovi'
- 'Boom Boom Boom' (5th place at International Music Festival "Suncane Skale" in Montenegro)
- 'Fairytale about love' (Single 2013)

Awards and achievements
Preceded by Debut	Tajikistan in the Intervision Song Contest; 2008	Succeeded by Farrukh Hasanov with "Gori!"
Preceded by (Czechoslovakia) Marika Gombitová with "Chcem sa s tebou deliť" (Finland) Marion Rung with "Hyvästi yö" (Soviet Union) Mykola Hnatyuk with "Na vstrechu oseni" (three-way tie)	Winner of the Intervision Song Contest; 2008	Succeeded by (Vietnam) Đức Phúc with "Phù Đổng Thiên Vương"
