= Copăceni, Ilfov =

Copăceni
- Commune
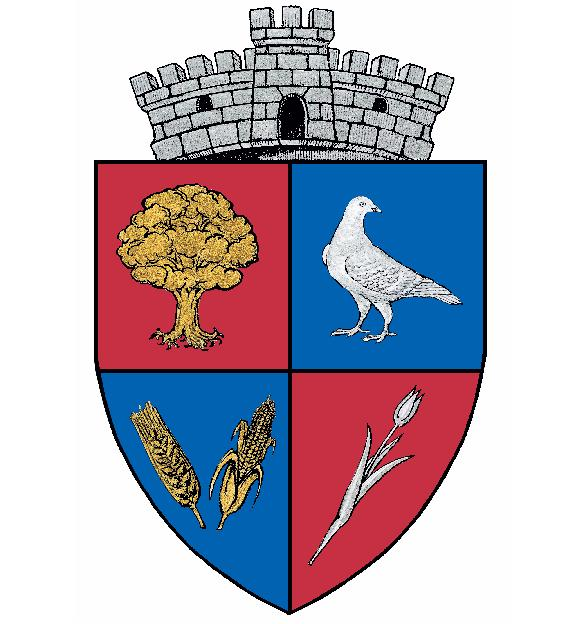
- Coat of arms

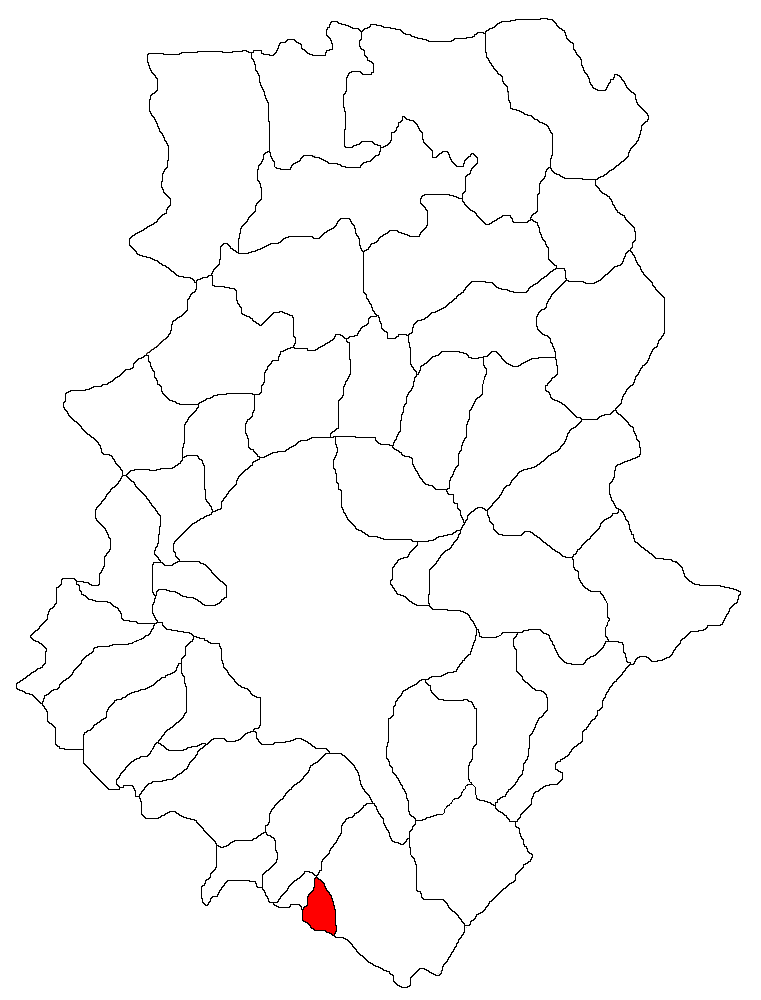
- Location in Ilfov County

- Location in Romania
- Coordinates: 44°16′20″N 26°4′45″E
- Country: Romania
- County: Ilfov

Government
  - Mayor (2024–2028): Ionuț Marin (PNL)
- Area: 18 km^{2} (6.9 sq mi)
- Elevation: 61 m (200 ft)
- Population (2021-12-01): 3,129
  - Density: 170/km^{2} (450/sq mi)
- Time zone: UTC+02:00 (EET)
  - Summer (DST): UTC+03:00 (EEST)
- Postal code: 077006
- Area code: +(40) 21
- Vehicle reg.: IF
- Website: primariacopaceniilfov.ro

Copăceni is a commune in Ilfov County, Muntenia, Romania, established in 2005 when it was split off from 1 Decembrie. It is composed of a single village, Copăceni.

Historical population
Year	Pop.	±%
2002	2,838	—
2011	3,131	+10.3%
2021	3,129	−0.1%
Source: Census data
