= Vivat Russia! =

Dancesport tournament

"Vivat Russia!" International Open DanceSport Tournament
- Genre: Dancesport tournament
- Frequency: annual
- Locations: "Festivalny" Concert Hall, Sochi, Russian Federation
- Years active: 2007–present
- Inaugurated: June 28, 2007
- Participants: Russia, Armenia, Bulgaria, Belarus, Croatia, Czech Republic, Estonia, France, Germany, Israel, Italy, Latvia, Lithuania, Moldova, Poland, Portugal, Serbia, Slovenia, Spain, Ukraine
- Website: http://vivat-russia.org/

"Vivat Russia!" International Open DanceSport Tournament is a dancesport tournament held on annual basis (since 2007) in Krasnodar region. Starting from 2007 the tournament is recognized as an international one being held in Adler, from 2009 on the tournament has been held in Sochi. The contest consists of two syllabi: Standard and Latin. Dancers that chose the first syllabus must base their routines on Waltz, Tango, Viennese Waltz, Slow Foxtrot and Quickstep. Dancers that chose the Latina syllabus must base their routines on such dances as Latina, Samba, Cha-Cha-Cha, Rumba, Paso Doble and Jive. "Vivat Russia!" is a traditional tournament of the World DanceSport Federation (WDSF). Each participant of the tournament receives rating points and takes his or her position in the world ratings based on the rank achieved. International status is the highest status available, thus couples competing at "Vivat Russia!" Tournament may potentially receive maximum possible number of points.

"Vivat Russia!" is also an official rating tournament of the Dance Sport Federation of Russia. Couples that take part in this tournament receive rating points that improve their rating in Russian Federation. This allows the best couples to skip the hardest elimination rounds at the next year Russian Federation Championship based on results of the previous year.

"Vivat Russia!" Tournament is considered a must for couples who wish to improve their dancing class. To improve their class a couple must gain at least two rating points at the tournament. "Glory to Russia" Tournament, Russian Federation championships and contests have the same status. There is no other such tournament. "Vivat Russia!" IOT is considered the world's second dancesport tournament by number of participants.

== Rules ==
International tournaments must comply with WDSF Competition Rules. Any other tournaments must comply with DSFR Regulations, including dress design regulations and movements restrictions.

=== Figures ===
- Lifts are not permitted in any category.
- In Latin American dances only basic hand positions (changed positions 1, 2, 3) are used. Couples may dance for maximum of 4 bars without hand connections (6 bars for Jive).
- For Cha-Cha-Cha with Guapacha timing in D class Close Basic and Check may be performed. In C class Time Step, Fan, Turkish Towel and Cross Basic may be performed.

=== Dancers' dresses ===
- Dresses have to create characteristic shape for each discipline representing special character of Standard and Latin American dances.
- Dresses have to cover the intimate parts of the dancer's body (intimacy area).
- Dresses and make-up have to respect age and level of dancers.
- Using of religious symbols as decoration or decoration jewelry is not allowed (does not apply to personal jewelry).
- The chairman can ask the competitor to remove an item of jewelry or dress if it presents danger to the dancer or to other competitors.
- It is allowed to dance in dresses for lower categories.
- Any use of material or color or construction or other contrivance that gives the appearance of non-compliance with these dress rules, even though there is no breach of the literal wording of these rules, will be a breach of these rules if so determined by the Chairman of Adjudicators.
- Dancers not dressed in accordance with this Dress Regulation and who receive a warning from the Chairman of Adjudicators has to comply with the regulation or face disqualification.

== History of the Tournament ==
The idea of the tournament belongs to Pavel Dorokhov, the President of the Dance Sport Federation of Russia, and Vladimir Shturkin, Director of the Dynamo Dance Sport Center and member of the Presidium of Kuban Dance Sport Federation. In 2005 the pilot tournament named "The Pearl of Russia" was held. The name was given to honor the city of Sochi hosting the tournament. Sochi Summer Cinema was chosen the venue for the event. The competitions held in 2005 shown that the event was of great interest for dancers from Russia and CIS countries. In addition to Russian dancers Ukrainian and Armenian dancers took part in the first tournament. In August 2006 the second dancesport tournament was held in Sochi. Since the competitions were considered a great success, it was decided to establish an emblematic tournament which would be held at the Black Sea coast and attract not only Russian dancing couples but foreign dancers as well.

== Organizers of the Tournament ==
- DanceSport Federation of Russia
- Krasnodar Regional Non-governmental Organization "Kuban Dance Sport Federation"
- Krasnodar Regional Non-governmental Organization "Dynamo Sport Center"

== Emblem of the Tournament ==
One of the differences between "Vivat Russia!" and other similar events is its unique emblem displaying a dancing couple, which is renewed on annual basis.

== Tournament Chronicles ==
=== "Vivat Russia!" - 2007 ===
"Vivat Russia!" First International Open Tournament was held from June 28 until July 1, 2007, at Alexander Karelin Sports Center in Adler. 1217 couples competed in 29 groups. As a part of the tournament the Sochi Mayor Cup Contest was officially held.

=== "Vivat Russia!" - 2008 ===
Venue: "Vesna" boarding house and Alexander Karelin Sports Center in Adler.

=== "Vivat Russia!" - 2009 ===
The tournament was held from June 23 to June 28 at "Festivalny" Concert Hall in Sochi. 2257 couples from 64 regions of Russian Federation and 25 other countries competed in 31 groups. For the first time as a part of the tournament the championship was held between teams of federal districts of Russian Federation. The tournament was attended by Pavel Dorokhov and Heinz Spaeker, Germany, the WDSF Sports Director, who acted in the capacity of the Chairman of Adjudicators.

=== "Vivat Russia!" - 2010 ===
"Vivat Russia!" International Open DanceSport Tournament 2010 was held from June 22 to June 27, 2010, at "Festivalny" Concert Hall in Sochi. 2526 couples from 14 countries and 62 regions of Russian Federation competed in 27 groups. The Board of Adjudicators from 38 regions noted high class of competing dancers. As a part of the tournament Krasnodar Regional Dance Sport Cup was also held.

=== "Vivat Russia!" - 2011 ===
Fifth International Open DanceSport Tournament 2011 was held from June 22 to June 26, 2011, at "Festivalny" Concert Hall in Sochi. 2800 couples from 22 countries and 61 regions of Russian Federation competed in 30 groups. The Board of Adjudicators was composed of referees from 17 countries. As a part of "Vivat Russia!" IOT 2011 event, the XVI "Exercise" National Award Annual Ceremony was held in order to award those who made the most significant contribution to development of dancesport in 2010.

== Tournament trends ==
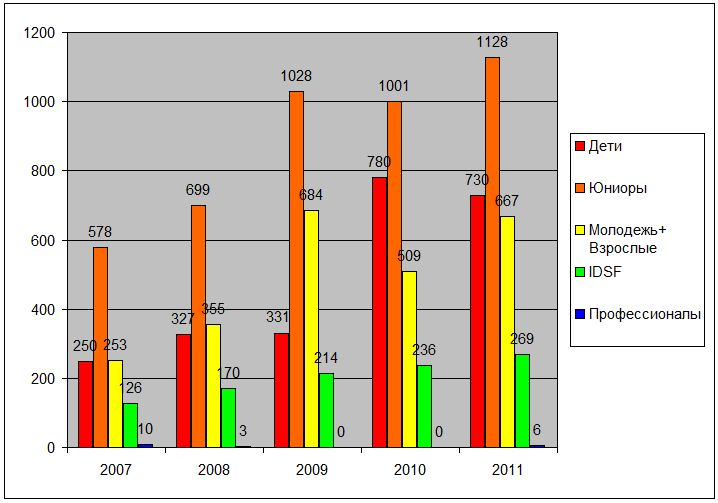
Diagram showing general trends of "Vivat Russia!" Tournament, 2007-2011

Number of participating couples by year:

Category	2007	2008	2009	2010	2011
Juveniles	250	327	331	780	730
Juniors	578	699	1028	1001	1128
Youth&Adults	253	355	684	509	667
IDSF/WDSF	126	170	214	236	269
Professionals	10	3	0	0	6
Total	1217	1554	2257	2526	2800
