= Marion Rung =

Finnish pop singer (born 1945)

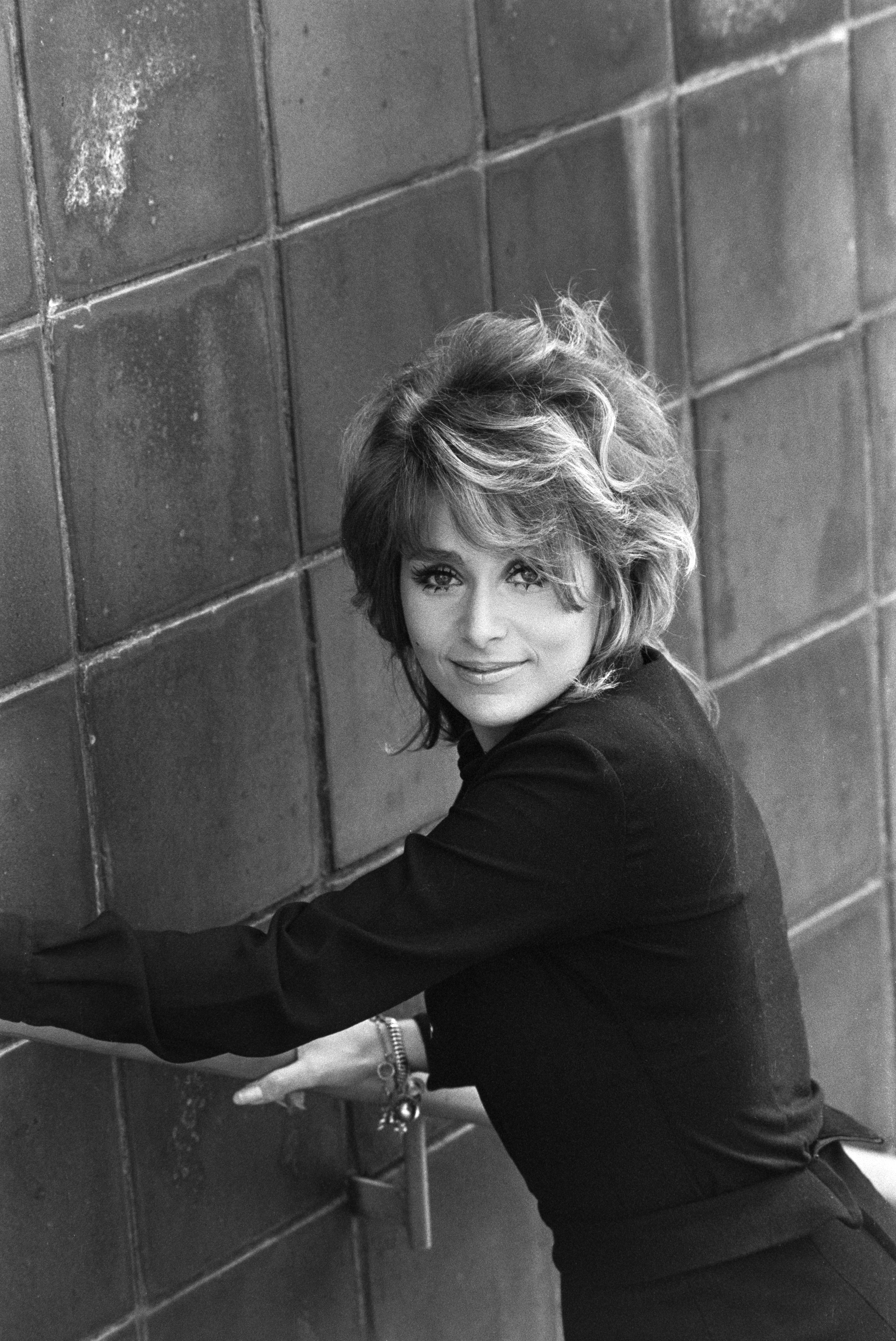
- Rung in 1971

Background information
- Born: Marion Evi Rung; 7 December 1945 (age 80); Helsinki, Finland
- Genre: Pop
- Occupation: Singer
- Years active: 1961–present
- Labels: Columbia, EMI, Flamingo, Bluebird
- Website: www.marionrung.fi

Marion Evi Rung (born 7 December 1945) is a Finnish pop singer. She is known for having represented Finland in the Eurovision Song Contest in 1962 and 1973. Her 1962 Eurovision song was placed 7th, and in 1973, she managed to bring Finland's second best result in the contest until 2006 by finishing in 6th place. She also won the Grand Prix of the Sopot International Song Festival in 1974 and the Intervision Song Contest 1980 with "Where is the Love."

== Life ==
Born in 1945 in Helsinki, Rung is Jewish, and she is of Russian descent through her mother, Rosa Manulkin, and of Polish descent through her father, Oscar Rung. She started her career in 1961, when she came second in a Finnish song contest. The success gave her a chance to record her first single Brigitte Bardot. Her most famous schlagers include "Tipi-tii", "El Bimbo" and "Eviva Espanja." In the 1970s, she also became well known in Germany. She continued her career, and in 2000, she was one fourth of the Leidit lavalla line-up with Katri Helena, Paula Koivuniemi, and Lea Laven.

Rung's mother tongue is Swedish, and she has appeared in Swedish radio and television. In 1962, she made a show at the famous Swedish live music bar Hamburger börs in Stockholm and also made records in Swedish.

During the 1970s, she recorded five singles in Germany 1975-79, and the most successful, El Bimbo sold 100,000 copies. She also made an LP in English, Love is... in 1978.

Marion Rung won "Syksyn Sävel" ("Tune of Autumn") at schlager Finnish song festival in 1977, as the first woman so far, with the song "Rakkaus on hellyyttä" (Love is affection) and in 1974 and 1980 she won the Sopot International Song Festival.

She celebrated 45 years on stage 2005 with concerts in Savoy-teather, Helsinki. The same year a 4CD- collection "Shalom, rakkaimmat lauluni" (Shalom, my favorite songs) was released as well as her biography "Minä ja Marion" ("Me and Marion"). She also played the leading role in the musical Annie get your gun. In 2009 Rung received a golden record of the album "Elämänvoimaa" (Vitality).

From 1961 to 2023, Marion Rung made almost 100 singles and 24 albums.

== Discography ==
=== Studio albums ===
- 1972 – Shalom (FIN #7)
- 1973 – Tom Tom Tom (FIN #7)
- 1974 – Lauluja sinusta (FIN #12)
- 1975 – El Bimbo (FIN #1)
- 1976 – Baby Face (FIN #6)
- 1977 – Marion "77" (FIN #1)
- 1977 – Rakkaus on hellyyttä (FIN #4)
- 1978 – Love is... (FIN #9)
- 1978 – Por favor (FIN #4)
- 1979 – Onni on kun rakastaa (FIN #5)
- 1980 – Moni-ilmeinen Marion (FIN #10)
- 1982 – Rakkaimmat lauluni (FIN #12)
- 1983 – Elän kauttasi
- 1984 – Nainen
- 1988 – Marion -88
- 1994 – Nuo silmät (FIN #28)
- 1995 – Hän lähtee tanssiin
- 1997 – Yön tähdet
- 2000 – Sadetanssi
- 2000 – Leidit Levyllä
- 2009 – Elämän voimaa
- 2012 – Sydänsillat

=== Live albums ===
- 1969 – Marion on onnellinen
- 1989 – Marionin konsertti
- 2012 – Sydänsillat

=== Compilation albums ===
- 1973 – Marion Rung 1962-1966
- 1974 – Marionin parhaita
- 1977 – Marionin parhaita 2
- 1978 – Makeelta maistaa Marion 1969-1970
- 1979 – Marionin parhaita 3
- 1982 – 18 toivotuinta
- 1989 – Iskelmäkansio
- 1994 – Aarteet
- 1994 – Aarteet 2
- 1995 – 20 suosikkia - Tipi-tii
- 1996 – 20 suosikkia - El Bimbo
- 2000 – Aurinkosilmät
- 2001 – Kaunis satu rakkauden
- 2004 – Shalom - rakkaimmat lauluni (FIN #33)
- 2004 – Elän parasta aikaa - 36 rakastetuinta laulua
- 2005 – Marion, olkaa hyvä - kaikki singlet 1971-1986
- 2006 – Nostalgia
- 2008 – Collections
- 2011 – Hyvästi yö - 15 suosikkia
- 2011 – Tähtisarja - 30 suosikkia
- 2015 – Marion - Sinulle

=== Singles ===
- 1961 – "Brigitte Bardot" (FIN #9)
- 1962 – "Tipi-tii (FIN #1)
- 1962 – "Oi jaakko" (FIN #6)
- 1962 – "Lady Sunshine ja Mr. Moon" (FIN #15)
- 1963 – "Manzanilla" (FIN #18)
- 1963 – "Pekan tyttö" (FIN #27)
- 1964 – "Haaremin ruusu / My Boy Lollipop" (FIN #14)
- 1973 – "Tom Tom Tom" (FIN #1)
- 1973 – "Eviva Espanja" (FIN #3)
- 1973 – "Jokainen päivä on liikaa" (FIN #10)
- 1974 – "Tule tule tuutimaan" (FIN #27)
- 1975 – "El Bimbo" (FIN #1)
- 1975 – "Ding-a-dong" (FIN #7)
- 1975 – "Silloin" (FIN #1)
- 1975 – "Pepe" (FIN #5)
- 1976 – "Nyt huolet pois" (FIN #30)
- 1976 – "Baby Face" (FIN #29)
- 1976 – "Kylähäät" (FIN #1)
- 1977 – "Prinsessa" (FIN #11)
- 1977 – "Uudestaan" (FIN #25)
- 1977 – "Rakkaus on hellyyttä" (FIN #5)
- 1978 – "Senorita por favor" (FIN #5)
- 1979 – "Halleluja" (FIN #12)
- 1979 – "Napoleon" (FIN #17)
- 1980 – "Hyvästi yö" (FIN #3)
- 1980 – "Ihmejuttu" (FIN #20)

== See also ==
- List of best-selling music artists in Finland

Preceded by Laila Kinnunen with Valoa ikkunassa	Finland in the Eurovision Song Contest; 1962	Succeeded by Laila Halme with Muistojeni laulu
Preceded by Päivi Paunu & Kim Floor with Muistathan	Finland in the Eurovision Song Contest; 1973	Succeeded by Carita with Keep Me Warm
Preceded by Ritva Oksanen with "Tuulessa soitto sousi"	Finland in the Intervision Song Contest; 1980	Succeeded by None
Preceded by (Poland) Czesław Niemen with "Nim przyjdzie wiosna"	Winner of the Intervision Song Contest; 1980 (tied with (Czechoslovakia) Marika Gombitová & (Soviet Union) Mykola Hnatyuk)	Succeeded by (Tajikistan) Tahmina Niyazova with "Hero"
