= Tajikistan in the Intervision Song Contest =

- Participating broadcaster: TV Safina (TVS; 2025–present)

Participation summary
- Appearances: 2
- First appearance: 2008
- Highest placement: 1st: 2008

Tajikistan participated in the Intervision Song Contest twice: in 2008 and in 2025.

== History ==
Tajikistan debuted in 2008, with Tahmina Niyazova being the artist representing the state. The country won the event with 216 points.

Farrukh Hasanov soon represented Tajikistan in the 2025 revival, placing fifth.

== Participation overview ==
Table key
1	First place

Year	Artist	Song(s)	Language	Place	Points
2008	Tahmina Niyazova	"Zangi Telefon" (Занги телефон)	Tajik	1	216
2008	Tahmina Niyazova	"Tsvety Pod Snegom" (Цветы под снегом)	Russian	1	216
2008	Tahmina Niyazova	"Hero"	English	1	216
2025	Farrukh Hasanov	"Gori!" (Гори!)	Russian, English	5	344

== Related involvement ==
=== Commentators and jurors ===
Year	Channel	Commentator(s)	Juror	Ref.
2025	TVS	Unknown	Amirbeki Muso	
