= Kyrgyzstan in the Intervision Song Contest =

- Participating broadcaster: NTRK (2025–present)

Participation summary
- Appearances: 2
- First appearance: 2008
- Highest placement: 2nd: 2025

Kyrgyzstan was represented at the Intervision Song Contest in 2008 and 2025.

== History ==
Kyrgyzstan first participated in 2008 and was represented by Gulzinat Suranchieva, ending in 4th place. The country's highest placement was in 2025 with the Nomad trio, ending up in second place.

== Participation overview ==
Table key
2	Second place

Year	Artist	Song(s)	Language	Place	Points
2008	Gulzinat Suranchieva	"Kir kerbez"	Kyrgyz	4	195
2008	Gulzinat Suranchieva	"Molba" (Мольба)	Russian	4	195
2008	Gulzinat Suranchieva	"La Isla Bonita"	English	4	195
2025	Nomad	"Jalgyz saga" (Жалгыз сага)	Kyrgyz, Russian	2	373

== Related involvement ==
=== Commentators and jurors ===
Year	Channel	Commentator(s)	Juror	Ref.
2025	KTRK	Unknown	Yryskeldi Osmonkulov	
2025	Muzyka	Unknown	Yryskeldi Osmonkulov	
2025	Madaniyat Taryh Til	Unknown	Yryskeldi Osmonkulov	
