= Mykola Hnatyuk =

Ukrainian singer (born 1952)

Mykola Hnatyuk Микола Гнатюк PAU
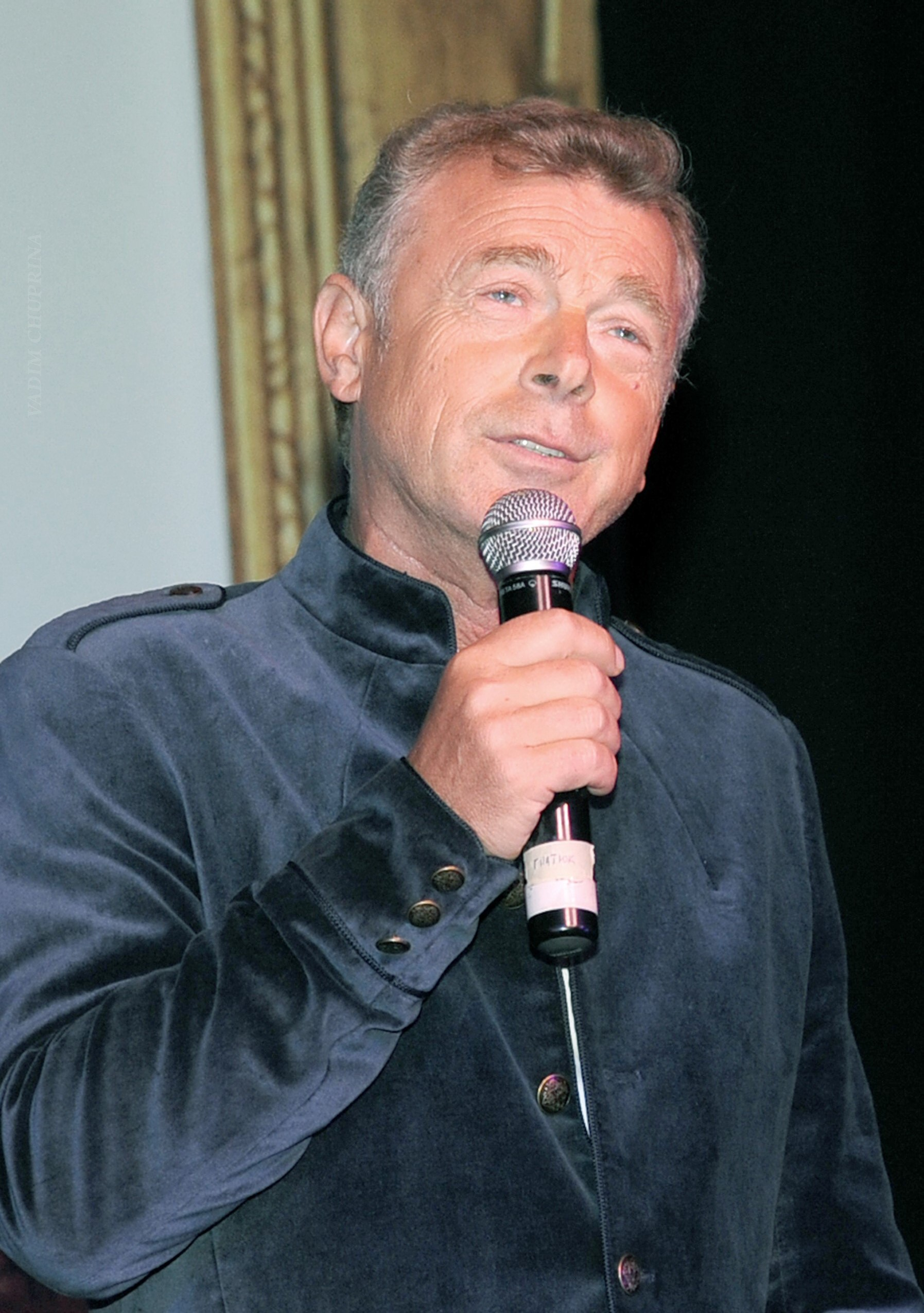

Background information
- Born: 14 September 1952 (age 73); Nemyrivka, Ukrainian SSR, Soviet Union (present-day Ukraine)
- Occupations: singer; songwriter; actor; musician
- Years active: 1970–present

Mykola Vasylyovych Hnatyuk (Note: Ukrainian: Микола Васильович Гнатюк, romanized: Mykola Vasylovych Hnatiuk, sometimes given as Mykola Vasyliovych Hnatiuk) (born 14 September 1952) is a Ukrainian and Soviet singer, popular in the early 1980s.

== Biography ==
In 1979 he won the Grand Prix at the Dresden Pop Music Festival with David Tukhmanov's I Dance With You (Russian: Я с тобой танцую). A year later Dancing on the Drum (Russian: Танец на барабане, penned by Raimonds Pauls) brought Hnatyuk the 1980 Sopot Intervision Song Contest Grand Prix, (Note: He scored 36 ponts and shared the first place with four other performers: Marion Rung (Finland, Where Is the Love), Marika Gombitova (Czechoslovakia, I Want to Share with You), Jigsaw (UK, Sky High) and Vox (Poland, Banana Song)) and made him famous at home. A year later came out Bird of Fortune (Russian: Птица счастья, by the Pakhmutova-Dobronravov songwriting team), another huge hit for him.

In 1988 Hnatyuk was awarded the title The People's Artist of the Ukrainian SSR.

In 2002 Mykola Hnatyuk received the title "Honorary Citizen of Mogilev" for his great contribution to the development of national cultures of Belarus and Ukraine.

In 2021, Mykola Hnatyuk pleased fans with new songs, which he recorded under the name Anastasiy.

== Notes ==
Awards and achievements
Preceded by Jaak Joala with "Podberu muziku""	Soviet Union in the Intervision Song Contest; 1980	Succeeded by None
Preceded by (Poland) Czesław Niemen with "Nim przyjdzie wiosna"	Winner of the Intervision Song Contest; 1980 (tied with (Czechoslovakia) Marika Gombitová & (Finland) Marion Rung)	Succeeded by (Tajikistan) Tahmina Niyazova with "Hero"
