= Urszula Sipińska =

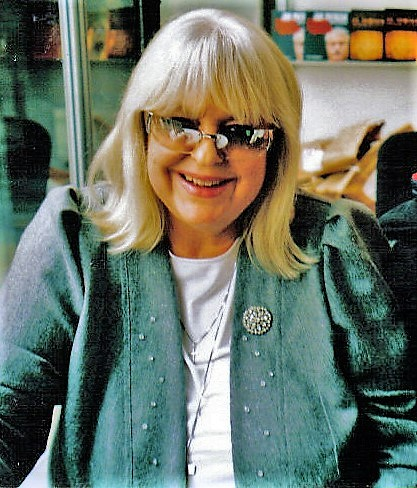

Background information
- Born: September 19, 1947 (age 78); Poznań, Poland
- Origin: Poland
- Genres: pop, country
- Occupations: singer-songwriter, architect, writer
- Years active: 1965–1994
- Labels: Pronit, Wifon, Polskie Nagrania Muza

Urszula Sipińska (born September 19, 1947) is a Polish singer-songwriter, architect and writer. Within twenty years of her musical career she earned numerous hits in Poland, including "Zapomniałam", "To był świat w zupełnie starym stylu", "Są takie dni w tygodniu", "Chcę wyjechać na wieś" and "Mam cudownych rodziców". She has won many awards and performed in Poland and abroad. At the turn of the 1980s and 1990s, Sipińska ended her singing career, focusing on architecture and writing.

== Biography ==
Urszula Sipińska was raised in Wilda, Poznań with elder sister Elżbieta and younger brother Stanisław. She went to music school where she learned to play piano, and later studied Interior Design at University of Fine Arts in Poznań. Although musically active already in her student years, it was not until 1967 that her singing career took off, when she performed "Zapomniałam" at the National Festival of Polish Song in Opole. The song, which she had co-written with her sister, became a major hit. In 1968, Sipińska won the 1st prize at the Sopot International Song Festival with the song "Po ten kwiat czerwony". She would subsequently perform at festivals in Switzerland and Tenerife to considerable success.

Sipińska's debut, self-titled album was released in 1971 by Pronit. Her song "Bright Days Will Come" was met with a positive reception at a festival in Mexico, when in Poland she enjoyed success with the song "Jaka jesteś Mario". Both songs were included on her second LP, Bright Days Will Come, released in 1973, which also included what would become one of her biggest hits, "To był świat w zupełnie starym stylu". The singer continued to perform in Poland and abroad, including East Germany and Japan, before releasing her next album Zabaw się w mój świat in 1975. At the festival in Palma, Sipińska was awarded with the 2nd prize for the song "Wołaniem wołam cię".

In 1980, she released her fourth album, Są takie dni w tygodniu/Kolorowy film, which consisted of two separate suites on both sides of the LP. The song "Są takie dni w tygodniu" became very popular and is now considered one of her biggest hits. This was followed by the country album W podróży, which was released in 1981 and spawned another hit, "Chcę wyjechać na wieś". In 1982, the singer suffered severe injuries in a car accident in Germany, which almost left her disabled. That prompted her to take a longer break from music.

She returned to recording in 1988 with the song "Mam cudownych rodziców", which would become an evergreen and arguably her biggest hit. It was included on her next album, Nie zapomniałam..., which was her last album of original material. According to the decision she had made at the beginning of her career, Urszula Sipińska gave up singing, having turned 40. She would only release a holiday album Białe święta in 1994, which consisted mostly of Polish Christmas carols. Sipińska focused on architecture and have worked on many high-profile projects. She also published feuilletons in magazines and released two books, Hodowcy lalek (2005) and Gdybym była aniołem. Historie prawdziwe, dziwne, śmieszne (2010).

== Notable songs ==
- "Zapomniałam"
- "Poziomki"
- "Jaka jesteś Mario"
- "To był świat w zupełnie starym stylu"
- "Komu weselne dzieci"
- "Chłopak z drewna"
- "Pamiętam nas"
- "Są takie dni w tygodniu"
- "Chcę wyjechać na wieś"
- "Muzyk, muzyk"
- "Mam cudownych rodziców"
- "Gdzie ten świat 60-tych lat"
- "Szalala, zabawa trwa"

== Discography ==
=== Studio albums ===
- 1971: Urszula Sipińska
- 1973: Bright Days Will Come
- 1975: Zabaw się w mój świat
- 1980: Są takie dni w tygodniu/Kolorowy film
- 1981: W podróży
- 1988: Nie zapomniałam...
- 1994: Białe święta

=== Compilation albums ===
- 1995: Zapomniałam...? The Best of Urszula Sipińska
- 1997: Antologia Vol. 1
- 1997: Antologia Vol. 2
- 1997: Antologia Vol. 3 – Ballady
- 1999: Są takie dni w tygodniu – Złota kolekcja
- 2000: Przystanek mojej młodości
- 2003: Wołaniem wołam cię – Perły
- 2006: Nie zapomniałam... Platynowa kolekcja
