= José Vélez =

Spanish singer

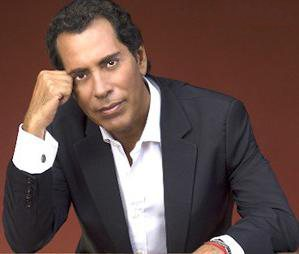
- José Vélez

Background information
- Born: José Velázquez Jiménez; 19 November 1951 (age 74); Telde (Las Palmas), Spain
- Occupation: Singer

José Velázquez Jiménez (born 19 November 1951 in Telde, Gran Canaria), better known by his stage name José Vélez (Spanish pronunciation: [xoˈse ˈβeleθ]), is a Spanish singer.

In the late 1960s, a music teacher from the Organización Juvenil Española (Spanish Youth Organisation) had the idea to create the music group Grupo Marabilla with some of his students, among them José Velázquez. When the group was dissolved, he began his solo career. In 1968 he participated in the talent contest Salto a la fama in Madrid and he began to get some recognition, which led him to establish in Madrid.

In 1976, he brought out his first album, Vino Griego, and one year later he participated in the Intervision Song Contest 1977 with the song "Romántica". He was internally chosen by Televisión Española as the Spanish entry for the Eurovision Song Contest 1978 in Paris with the song "Bailemos un vals". He placed 9th in a field of 20.

From that moment onwards he has developed most of his career in Latin America, where he has achieved 19 platinum record and 32 gold records.

Awards and achievements
Preceded by Salomé with "Pase lo que pase"	Spain in the Intervision Song Contest; 1977	Succeeded by Juan Erasmo Mochi with "Gitanito"
Preceded by Micky with "Enséñame a cantar"	Spain in the Eurovision Song Contest; 1978	Succeeded by Betty Missiego with "Su canción"
