= Sopot International Song Festival =

Polish music festival

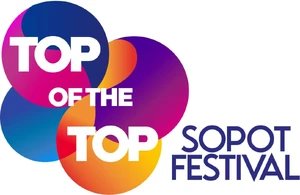
- Logo used since 2024
- Also known as: Sopot Music Festival Grand Prix; Sopot Top of the Top Festival
- Genre: Song contest
- Created by: Władysław Szpilman
- Country of origin: Poland
- No. of seasons: 54 contests

Production
- Production locations: Gdańsk (1961–1963); Sopot (1964–2009, 2012–)
- Production companies: TVP (1994–2004); TVN (2005–2009, 2017–); Polsat (2012–2014)

Original release
- Network: TVP1 (1994–2004); TVN (2005–2009, 2017–); Polsat (2012–2014)
- Release: 25 August 1961 – 23 August 1980
- Release: 23 August 1984 – 1 June 2009
- Release: 24 August 2012 – present

Related
- Intervision Song Contest

The Sopot International Song Festival or Sopot Festival (later called Sopot Music Festival Grand Prix, Sopot Top of the Top Festival from 2012–13 and Polsat Sopot Festival in 2014) is an annual international song contest held in Sopot, Poland. It is the biggest Polish music festival altogether with the National Festival of Polish Song in Opole, and one of the biggest song contests in Europe. Over the years, Elton John, Gloria Gaynor, Demis Roussos, Alla Pugacheva, Tamara Gverdtsiteli, Scorpions, Anastacia, Maryla Rodowicz, In-Grid and other popular performers from around the world performed at the festival.

The contest was organised and transmitted live by the public Telewizja Polska (TVP) between 1994 and 2004. The following year, the concert was broadcast by the private media station TVN for the first time and remained on TVN until 2009. From 2012 to 2014, the concert was broadcast and organised by Polsat. It was later cancelled by the broadcaster. The 2015 festival was not televised, however it returned in 2017 on TVN.

== Origins and history ==
=== Foundation and early years ===
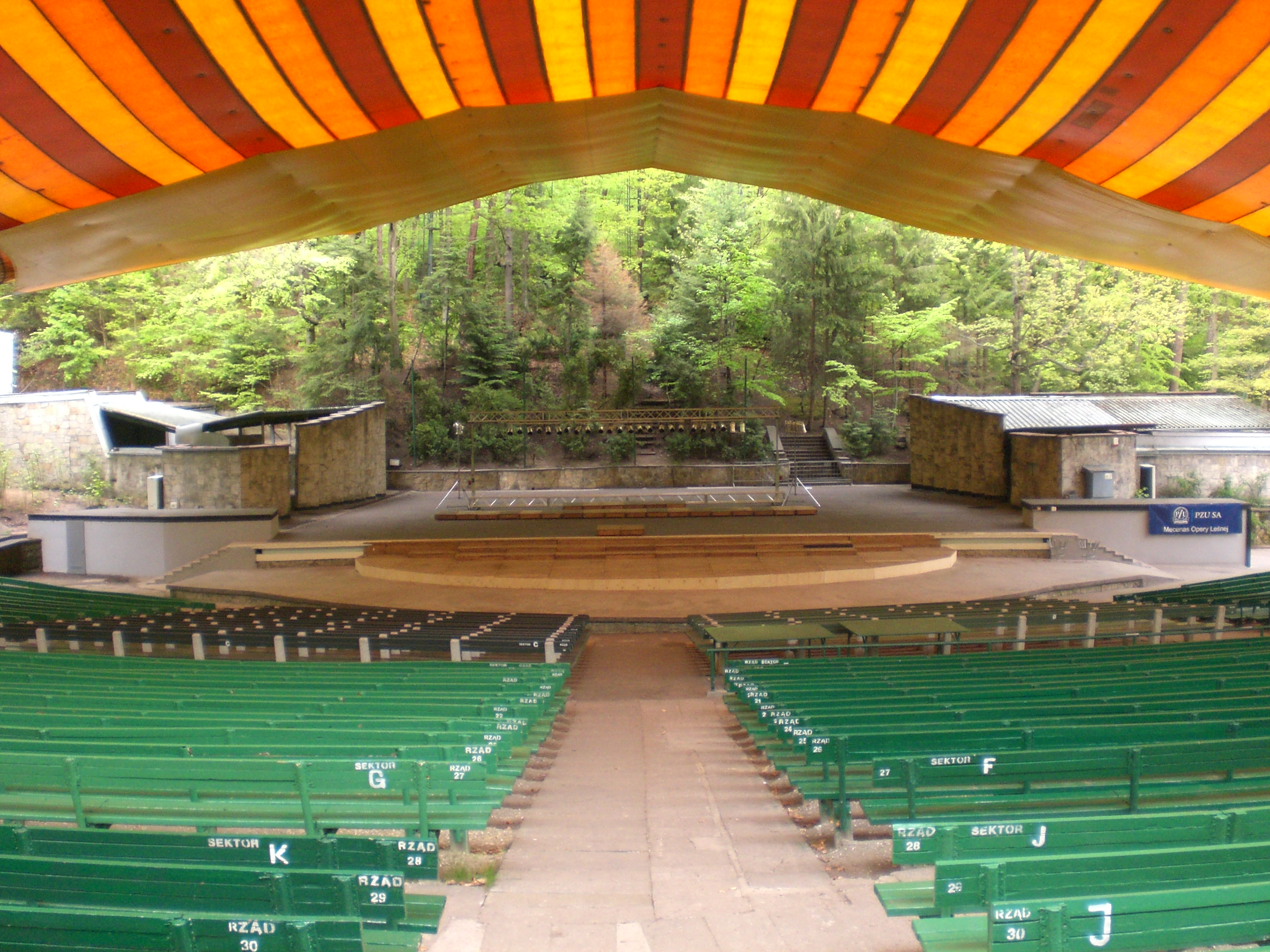
Forest Opera in Sopot (2007)

The first International Song Festival in Sopot was in 1961. The festival was organized by musician and composer Władysław Szpilman, then working as the head of Polish Radio's music department. Additional organizational support came from Szymon Zakrzewski from Polish Artists Management (PAGART). The first three festivals (1961–1963) were held at the Gdansk Shipyard hall after which the festival moved to the Forest Opera. Through most of its history, the main prize has been the Amber Nightingale trophy.

=== Replacement by Intervision ===
Between 1977 and 1980 it was replaced by the Intervision Song Contest, which was still held in Sopot. Unlike the Eurovision Song Contest, the Sopot International Music Festival often changed its formulas to pick a winner and offered many different contests for its participants. For example, at the 4th Intervision Song Festival (held in Sopot August 20–23, 1980) two competitions were effective: one for artists representing television companies, the other for those representing record companies. In the first the jury considered the artistic merits of the songs entered; while in the second, it judged the performers' interpretation."

The festival has always been open to non-European acts, and countries like Cuba, Dominican Republic, Mongolia, New Zealand, Nigeria, Peru, South Africa and many others have been represented in this event.

The contest lost popularity in Poland and abroad in the 1980s, declining further during the 1990s, and the rather unconvincing organisations by Telewizja Polska (TVP) made the authorities of Sopot give the organization of the 2005 Sopot International Song Festival to a private TV channel, TVN.

Since 1999, there was no contest. TVP chose to invite well-known artists instead, featuring the likes of Whitney Houston, Tina Turner, The Corrs, Lionel Richie, UB40, Ricky Martin and Simply Red to perform. In 2005, TVN brought the international competition back, taking over from TVP, and in 2006 invited Elton John and Katie Melua. The Sopot International Song Festival is usually considered bigger than the Benidorm Song Festival because of its ability to attract star performers.

=== Revival ===
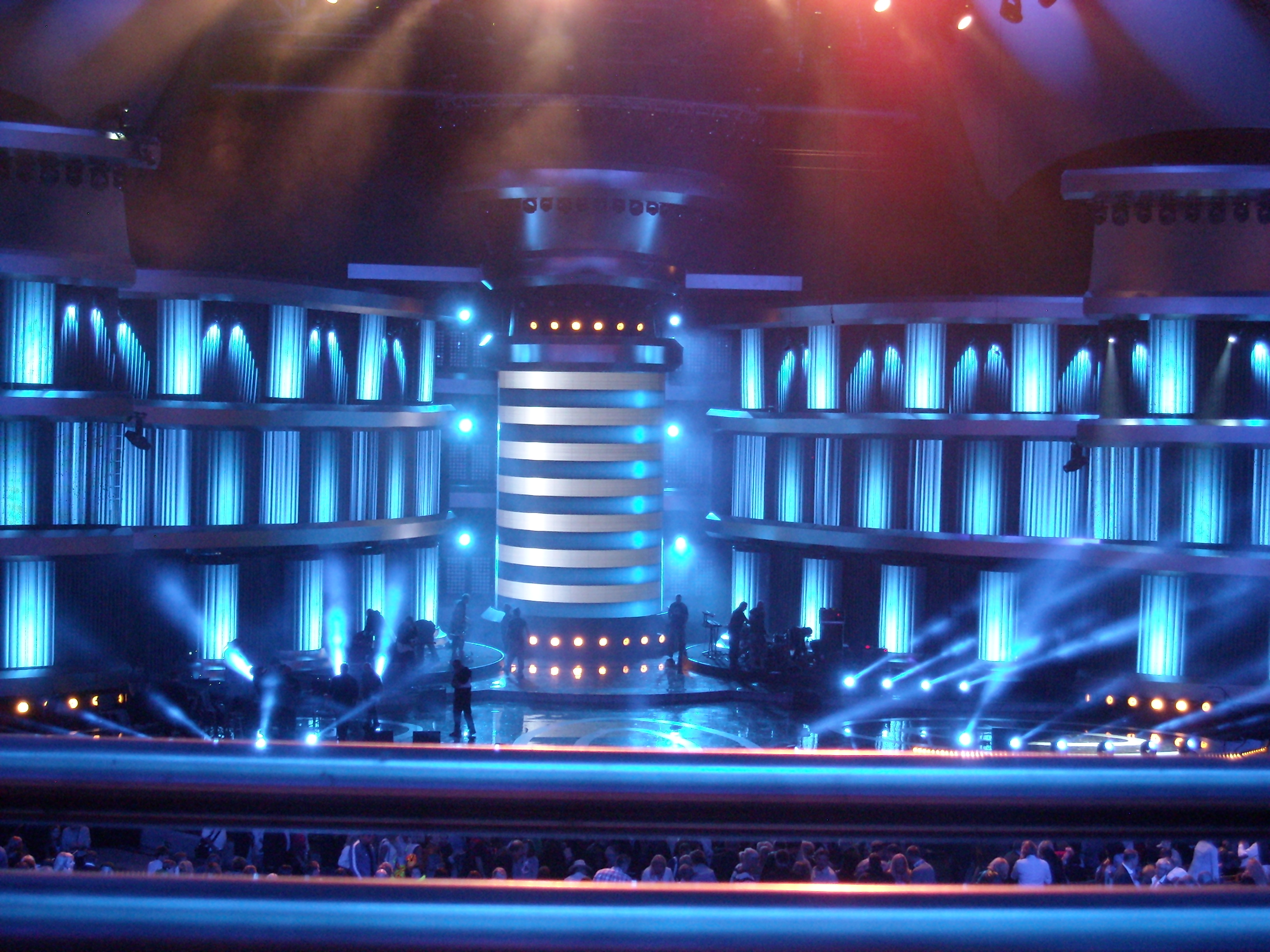
Stage for the Sopot Top Of The Top Festival 2013

In 2010 and 2011, the festival did not take place due to renovation of the Forest Opera. Since 2012, it is called Sopot Top Of The Top Festival and is broadcast annually by Polsat. In 2014, the name was changed to Polsat Sopot Festival. In 2015, Polsat decided not to organize the festival. However, the city authorities decided to organize a one-day festival in Sopot this year, but without a television broadcast.

In 2016, the concert did not take place due to the lack of a television partner, which initially was to be TVP. After a year of break, the decision was made to restore the festival. Since 2017, it has been organized and broadcast by TVN again.

The festival also provided opportunity to listen to international stars. In the past, it featured Charles Aznavour, Demis Roussos, Boney M, Gloria Gaynor, Petula Clark, Johnny Cash, Chuck Berry, Shirley Bassey, Village People, Kool and the Gang, Vanessa Mae, Sabrina, C.C.Catch, Annie Lennox, Paul Young, Marillion, Scorpions, Alphaville, Kim Wilde, Bonnie Tyler, Jimmy Somerville, Erasure, Belinda Carlisle, Vaya Con Dios, Chris Rea, Bryan Adams, Tanita Tikaram, La Toya Jackson, Rick Astley, Shakin’ Stevens, Londonbeat, Bad Boys Blue, Technotronic. Kajagoogoo, Limahl, Goran Bregovic, Norah Jones, Anastacia, Maryla Rodowicz, Ricky Martin, In-Grid, Alla Pugacheva and many others.

== Competition overview and winners ==
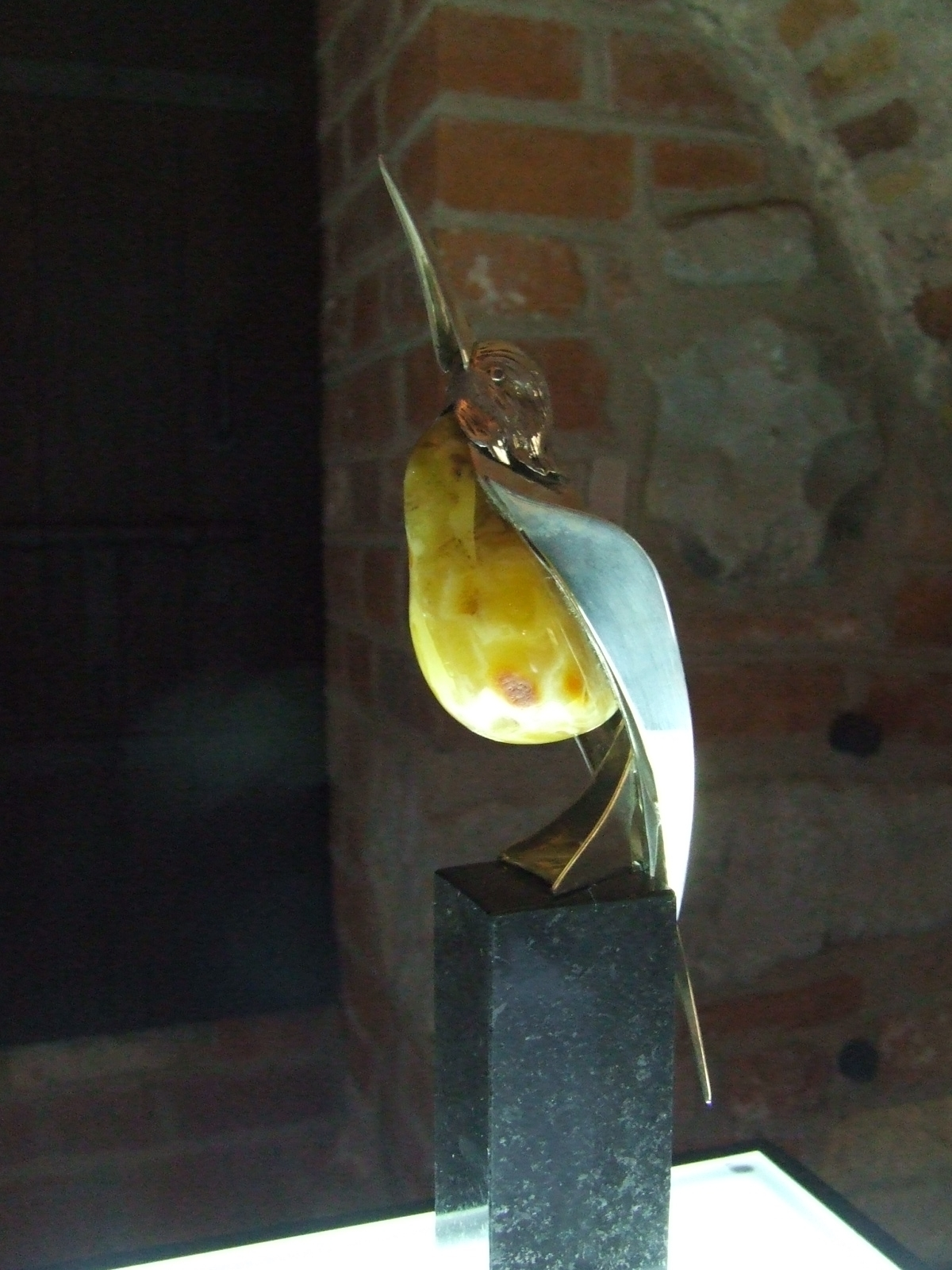
Amber Nightingale Award

This list includes only winners of the most prestigious contests within the Sopot Music Festival. Sometimes one contest has overshadowed another with time. Grand Prix de disque was the most prestigious award between 1974 and 1976 and the Intervision Song Contest during 1977–80. Since the 1980s, the main prize of the festival is the Amber Nightingale award.

The festival has also given prizes for Best Interpretation in the 1960s, and Winner Of The Polish Day on and off from the 1960s to the 1980s.

Year	Date	Country	Performer	Song(s)
1961–1973: Price for the Masterpiece
1961	25–27 August	Switzerland	Jo Rolland	"Nous Deux"
1962	6–8 July	Greece	Jeanne Yovanna	"Ti Krima"
1963	15–18 August	USSR	Tamara Miansarova	"Пусть всегда будет солнце!" (ex-aequo)
1963	15–18 August	France	Simone Langlois	"Toi et ton sourire" (ex-aequo)
1964	6–12 August	Greece	Nadia Constantopoulou	"S'efharisto kardia mou"
1965	5–8 August	Canada	Monique Leyrac	"Mon pays"
1966	25–28 August	United States	Lana Cantrell	"I'm all smiles"
1967	17–20 August	Poland	Dana Lerska	"Po prostu jestem"
1968	22–25 August	Poland	Urszula Sipińska	"Po ten kwiat czerwony"
1969	21–24 August	Switzerland	Henri Dès	"Maria Consuelo"
1970	27–30 August	Canada	Robert Charlebois	"Ordinaire"
1971	26–29 August	United Kingdom	Samantha Jones	"He Moves Me"
1972	23–26 August	USSR	Lev Leschchenko	"Я не был с ним знаком" (ex-aequo)
1972	23–26 August	Poland	Andrzej Dąbrowski	"Do zakochania jeden krok" (ex-aequo)
1973	21–25 August	United Kingdom	Tony Craig	"Can You Feel It" and "Song of Skaldowie"
1974–1976: Grand Prix de disque
1974	21–24 August	Finland	Marion Rung	"Uskon lauluun"
1975	20–23 August	United Kingdom	Glen Weston	"I Still Love You"
1976	24–29 August	USSR	Irina Ponarovskaya	"Мольба"
1977–1980: Intervision Song Contest
1977	24–27 August	Czechoslovakia	Helena Vondráčková	"Malovaný džbánku"
1978	23–26 August	USSR	Alla Pugacheva	"Всё могут короли"
1979	22–25 August	Poland	Czesław Niemen	"Nim przyjdzie wiosna"
1980	20–23 August	Finland	Marion Rung	"Hyvästi yö"
No festival held 1981–1983 due to martial law
1984–1987: Sopot Music Festival Grand Prix
1984	15–18 August	Poland	Krystyna Giżowska	"Blue Box"
1985	21–24 August	Sweden	Herreys	"Summer Party"
1986	20–23 August	United States	Mara Getz	"Hero Of My Heart"
1987	19–22 August	West Germany	Double Take	"Rockola"
1988–1990: Golden Disc
1988	20–23 August	United States	Kenny James	"The Magic In You"
1989	16–19 August	Norway	Dance with a Stranger	"By"
1990	15–18 August	Poland	Lora Szafran	"Zły chłopak" and "Trust Me At Once"
1991–1993: Sopot Music Festival Grand Prix
1991	22–25 August	Latvia	New Moon	"Ice"
1992	27–30 August	Austria	Mark Andrews	Unknown
1993	26–28 August	Lithuania	Arina	"Rain Is Coming Down"
1994–2004: Sopot Music Festival Grand Prix (with TVP)
1994	26–27 August	Poland	Varius Manx	"Zanim zrozumiesz"
1995	25–26 August	Poland	Kasia Kowalska	"Jak rzecz" and "A to co mam"
1996	22–24 August	No competition held		
1997	22–23 August	Netherlands	Total Touch	"Somebody Else's Lover"
1998	21–22 August	Italy	Alex Baroni	"Male che fa male"
1999	20–22 August	Poland	Małgorzata Ostrowska	"Lawa"
2000	18–19 August	Czech Republic	Helena Vondráčková	"Veselé Vánoce a šťastný nový rok"
2001	24–25 August	Belgium	Natacha Atlas	"Ayeshteni"
2002	23–24 August	Poland	Irena Santor	"Jeszcze kochasz mnie”
2003	22–23 August	Poland	Skaldowie	"Hymn o miłości"
2004	20–21 August	No competition held		
2005–2011: Sopot Music Festival Grand Prix (with TVN)
2005	2–4 September	Poland	Andrzej Piaseczny	"Z głębi duszy" (all-Polish contest)
2006	1–3 September	United Kingdom	Mattafix	"Big City Life"
2007	31 August – 2 September	Poland	Feel	"A gdy już jest ciemno"
2008	23–24 August	Sweden	Oh Laura	"Release Me"
2009	22–23 August	Australia	Gabriella Cilmi	"Sweet About Me"
No festival held 2010–2011 due to the Euro area crisis
2012–2013: Sopot Top Of The Top Festival (with Polsat)
2012	24–25 August	Sweden	Eric Saade	"Hotter Than Fire"
2013	23–24 August	France	Imany	"You Will Never Know"
2014: Polsat Sopot Festival
2014	22–23 August	Poland	Ewa Farna	"Cicho"
2015: Sopot Festival
2015	21 August	No competition held		
No festival held in 2016 due to lack of broadcaster
Since 2017: Top of the Top Sopot Festival (with TVN)
2017	18–20 August	No competition held		
2018	14–16 August	Romania	Mihail	"Who You Are"
2019	13–15 August	Sweden	Frans	"If I Were Sorry"
No festival held in 2020 due to the COVID-19 pandemic
2021	17–20 August	Poland	Dawid Kwiatkowski	"Bez Ciebie"
2022	16–19 August	Poland	Michał Szpak	"24 na 7"
2023	21–24 August	Poland	Kwiat Jabłoni	"Od nowa"
2024	19–22 August	Poland	Oskar Cyms	"Cały czas"
2025	18–21 August	Poland	Carla Fernandes	"Co, jeśli?"
2026	24–27 August	Poland	Kuba i Kuba	"Stygnie lato"

== Winners by country ==
Wins	Country	Years
20	Poland	1967, 1968, 1972*, 1979, 1984, 1990, 1994, 1995, 1999, 2002, 2003, 2005, 2007, 2014, 2021, 2022, 2023, 2024, 2025, 2026
4	Sweden	1985, 2008, 2012, 2019
4	United Kingdom	1971, 1973, 1975, 2006
4	Soviet Union	1963*, 1972*, 1976, 1978
3	United States	1966, 1986, 1988
2	France	1963*, 2013
2	Finland	1974, 1980
2	Canada	1965, 1970
2	Switzerland	1961, 1969
2	Greece	1962, 1964
1	Romania	2018
1	Australia	2009
1	Belgium	2001
1	Czech Republic	2000
1	Italy	1998
1	Netherlands	1997
1	Lithuania	1993
1	Austria	1992
1	Latvia	1991
1	Norway	1989
1	West Germany	1987
1	Czechoslovakia	1977

*More than one winner at that year.

== See also ==
- Eurovision Song Contest
- Golden Orpheus
- Intervision Song Contest
- National Festival of Polish Song in Opole
- Sanremo Music Festival
- Sopot Hit Festival
