= Oh Laura =

Swedish Indie-pop band

- Origin: Stockholm, Sweden
- Genres: Country, indie pop
- Years active: 2004–present
- Labels: Cosmos; EMI
- Members: Frida Öhrn; Jocke Olovsson; Jörgen Kjellgren; Rikard Lidhamn; Magnus Olsson

Oh Laura, formerly known as Laura, is a Swedish Indie-pop band from Stockholm consisting of Frida Öhrn on vocals, Jocke Olovsson and Jörgen Kjellgren on guitars, Rikard Lidhamn on bass and Magnus Olsson on drums. The band's debut record, A Song Inside My Head, a Demon in My Bed, was released on May 25, 2007 under the independent label Cosmos Records. The first single off the record is "Release Me" and has appeared in a Saab commercial aired in Sweden, Norway, Poland, Spain, New Zealand, Australia, Ireland, France and the United Kingdom. "Release Me", peaked at #5 on Swedish music charts. Oh Laura won Grand Prix at International Sopot Festival on August 23, 2008 in Sopot, Poland The single Release Me was certified platinum by the Swedish IFPI in 2007.

== Band members ==
- Frida Öhrn – vocals
- Jocke Olovsson – guitar
- Jörgen Kjellgren – guitar
- Rikard Lidhamn – bass guitar
- Magnus Olsson – drums

== Discography ==
=== Albums ===
- A Song Inside My Head, a Demon in My Bed (2007)
- The Mess We Left Behind (2012)

=== Singles ===
- "Release Me" (2007)
- "It Ain't Enough" (2007)

Awards and achievements
Preceded by (Poland) Feel with "A gdy już jest ciemno"	Winner of Sopot Music Festival Grand Prix; 2008	Succeeded by (Australia) Gabriella Cilmi with "Sweet About Me"
