= Biser Kirov =

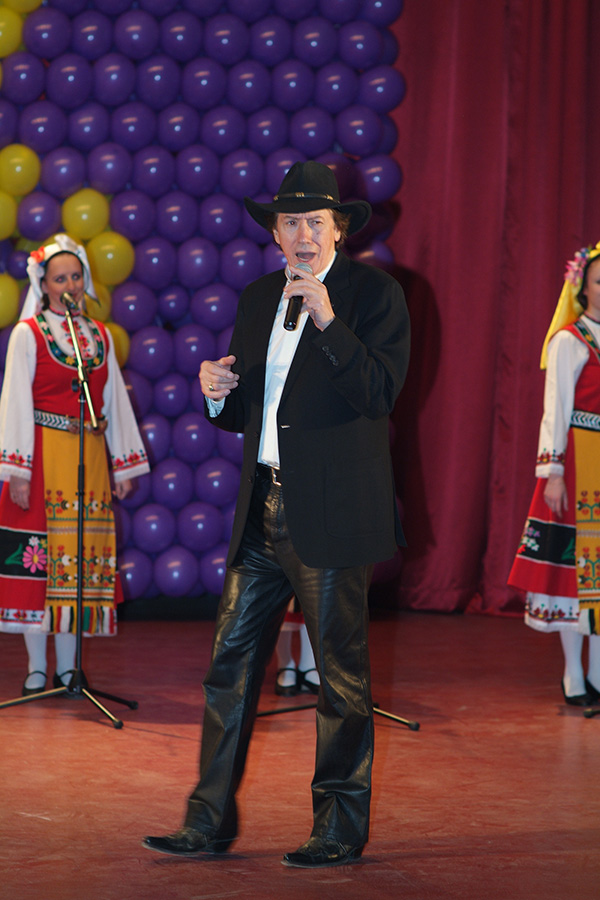

Biser Hristov Kirov (4 September 1942 – 6 November 2016) was a Bulgarian pop singer and tenor, who was called in the press the most popular Bulgarian in the USSR. Kirov called Russia his creative homeland.

== Biography ==
Kirov was born in Sofia. His father was Hristo Kirov Ankole, pastor of the Seventh-day Adventist Church (1914-1977). His mother was Ventsinosa Apostolova Kirova (1922-1989), a painter.

In 1961, Kirov graduated with honors from high school in Sofia. He created Reflex, one of the first Bulgarian rock bands. At the First International Festival of Youth Song in Sochi in 1967, Kirov finished third, the start of his broad career. He also worked a lot in television.

== Awards and titles ==
- Gold medal and the title of Singer of the Year IX World Festival of Youth and Students (1968)
- 1st prize Golden Orpheus (1970)
- Golden Dolphin (1975)
- Gold medal of the XII World Festival of Youth and Students (1985)
- Honored Artist of the People's Republic of Bulgaria (1985)
- Honorary President of the Republic of Bulgaria sign (2008)
- Honorary Diploma of the Government of Moscow (2008)
- Honored Artist of the Russian Federation (2009) — for outstanding contribution to the development of Russian-Bulgarian cultural co-operation and many years of creative activity
- Russian Federation Presidential Certificate of Honour (2012)
- Honorary Doctor of Moscow State University of Fine Chemical Technologies (2012)

== Personal life ==
He was married to Mitka Tsvetanova Kirova (born 1945), an engineer, a chemist-ecologist. They had two children and four grandchildren. Kirov died in Berlin, Germany on 6 November 2016.
