= Release Me (Oh Laura song) =

Single by Oh Laura

from the album A Song Inside My Head, A Demon In My Bed
- Released: 2007
- Recorded: 2007
- Genre: country, Indie pop
- Label: BAM

Oh Laura singles chronology
"Release Me" (2007)	"It Ain't Enough" (2007)

"Release Me" is a song made by the Swedish indie pop group Oh Laura, released as a single in 2007. The single is first off in Oh Laura's debut album, A Song Inside My Head, a Demon in My Bed.

Oh Laura won the Sopot International Song Festival in 2008 with the song.

== Remixes ==
The Swedish band The Attic also recorded a remix of "Release Me" featuring Oh Laura. It appears in the EP Release Me, The Attic Remix that contains for remix tracks:

1. "Release Me" (The Attic Remix) (3:35)
2. "Release Me" (Remix) (3:43)
3. "Release Me" (The Attic Extended Remix) (8:01)
4. "Release Me" (Extended Remix) (7:14)

== In popular culture ==
- The song appeared in a Saab commercial for the Saab 9-3 car model, which was aired in Sweden, Norway, Poland, Spain, Ireland, France and the United Kingdom and later also in New Zealand and Australia.
- Martin Halla sang the song in the semi-finals of The Voice – Norges beste stemme the inaugural season of the Norwegian The Voice. His version of "Release Me" peaked at number 7 on VG-lista, the Norwegian Singles Chart.

== Charts ==
Oh Laura version

Chart (2007–2008)	Peak position
Australia Digital Tracks (ARIA)	49
Sweden (Sverigetopplistan)	5
United Kingdom (UK Singles Chart)	47

Martin Halla version

Chart (2012)	Peak position
Norway (VG-lista)	7
