= Angela Similea =

Romanian singer

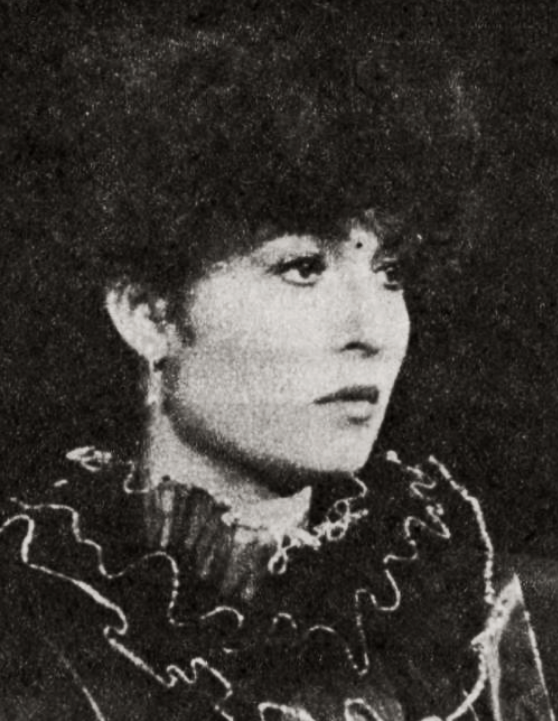
- Similea in 1986

Background information
- Born: Angela Ioana Similea; 9 July 1946 (age 79); 1 Decembrie, Ilfov County, Kingdom of Romania
- Origin: Romania
- Genres: Easy listening
- Occupations: Singer, pop star
- Instruments: Vocals/voice
- Years active: 1970–2021
- Movies: The Bet

Angela Similea (born 9 July 1946 in 1 Decembrie, Ilfov County, Kingdom of Romania) is a Romanian female pop star who was famous for easy listening music during the 1980s.

== The Golden Stag music festival ==
In the 1970 edition of the Golden Stag Festival, that took place in Brașov, Similea came second, winning The Silver Stag.
