= 1 Decembrie =

- Commune
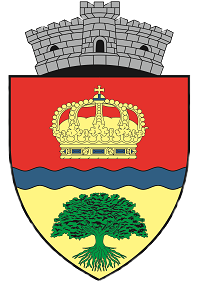
- Coat of arms

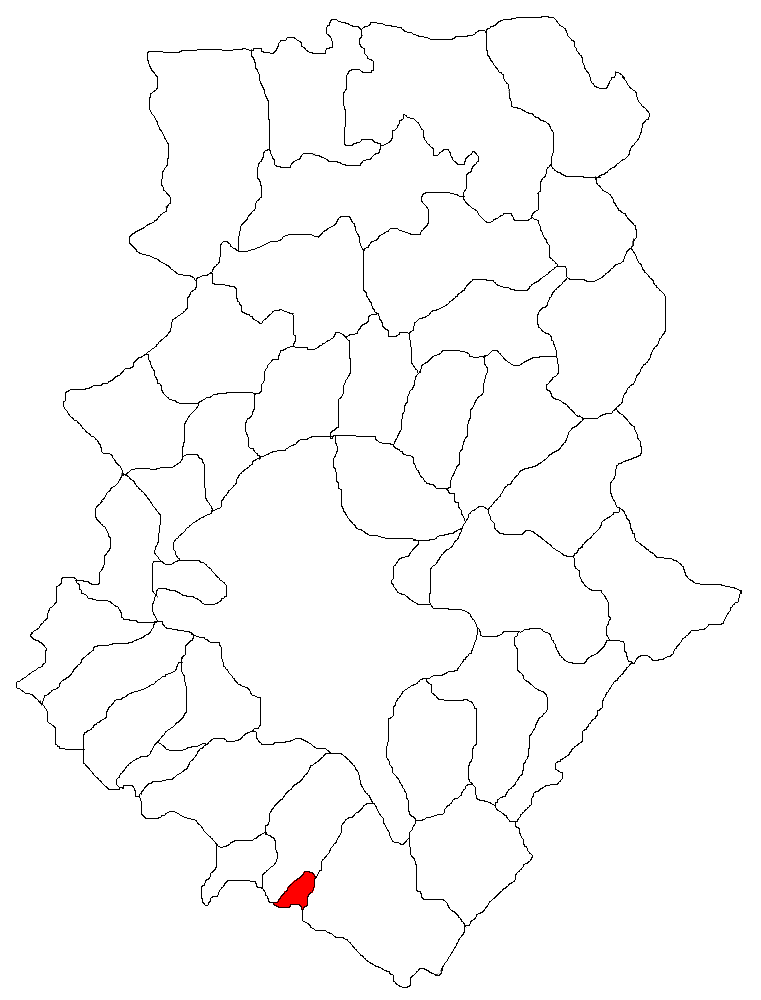
- Location in Ilfov County

- Location in Romania
- Coordinates: 44°17′N 26°4′E
- Country: Romania
- County: Ilfov

Government
  - Mayor (2024–2028): Gheorghe Petre (PNL)
- Area: 10.26 km^{2} (3.96 sq mi)
- Elevation: 62 m (203 ft)
- Population (2021-12-01): 8,206
  - Density: 799.8/km^{2} (2,071/sq mi)
- Time zone: UTC+02:00 (EET)
  - Summer (DST): UTC+03:00 (EEST)
- Postal code: 077005
- Area code: +(40) 21
- Vehicle reg.: IF
- Website: primaria1decembrie.ro

1 Decembrie is a commune in the south of Ilfov County, Muntenia, Romania, composed of a single village, 1 Decembrie. It also included the village of Copăceni until 2005, when it was split off to form a separate commune.

== Name ==
Originally named Copăcenii de Sus, in the 1930s the village changed its name to Regele Ferdinand, in memory of King Ferdinand of Romania. After the Communist takeover in the aftermath of World War II, the name was changed to 30 Decembrie (December 30), to commemorate the day when the country became a republic in 1947. In 1996, following the Romanian Revolution, the name was changed to 1 Decembrie (December 1), which marks Union Day, the day when the Kingdom of Romania was united with Transylvania in 1918.

== Demographics ==
Historical population
Year	Pop.	±%
2002	6,598	—
2011	7,817	+18.5%
2021	8,206	+5.0%
Source: Census data

As of the 2021 census, the commune had a population of 8,206, of which 78.15% were Romanians and 4.26% were Roma.

== Natives ==
- Angela Similea (born 1946), female pop star

== Sports ==
Sportul 30 Decembrie was a football club based in the commune. Founded in 1950, the club was financially supported by the local farm; its team was the first from Ilfov County to play in Liga II. The club was dissolved in 1992.
