= Festivalny =

Concert hall in Sochi, Russia

Coordinates: 43.5785°N 39.7214°E

The concert hall Festivalny is an entertainment facilities in the central region of Sochi, Krasnodar Krai, Russia.

The opening of the hall took place on July 14, 1979.
