= Forest Opera =

Open-air theatre in Sopot, Poland

- Interactive map of Forest Opera
- Location: Sopot, Poland
- Coordinates: 54°26′41″N 18°32′40″E
- Capacity: 5,047

Construction
- Opened: July 1909
- Renovated: 2009–2012

The Forest Opera (Polish: Opera Leśna, German: Waldoper) is an open-air amphitheatre located in Sopot, Poland, with a capacity of 5047 seats, the orchestra pit can contain up to 110 musicians.

== History ==
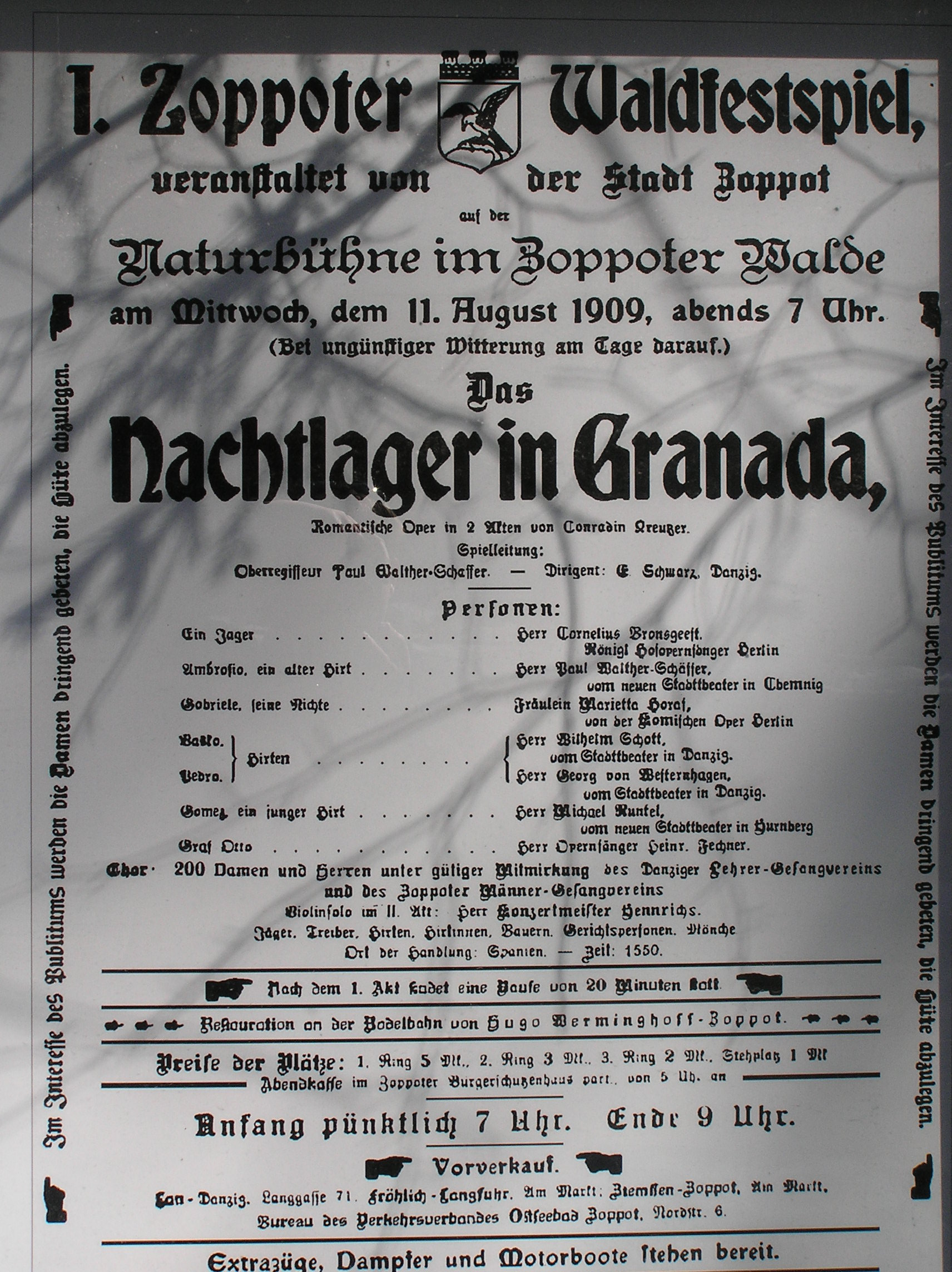
Poster of the First (1909) Zoppot Waldfestspiele

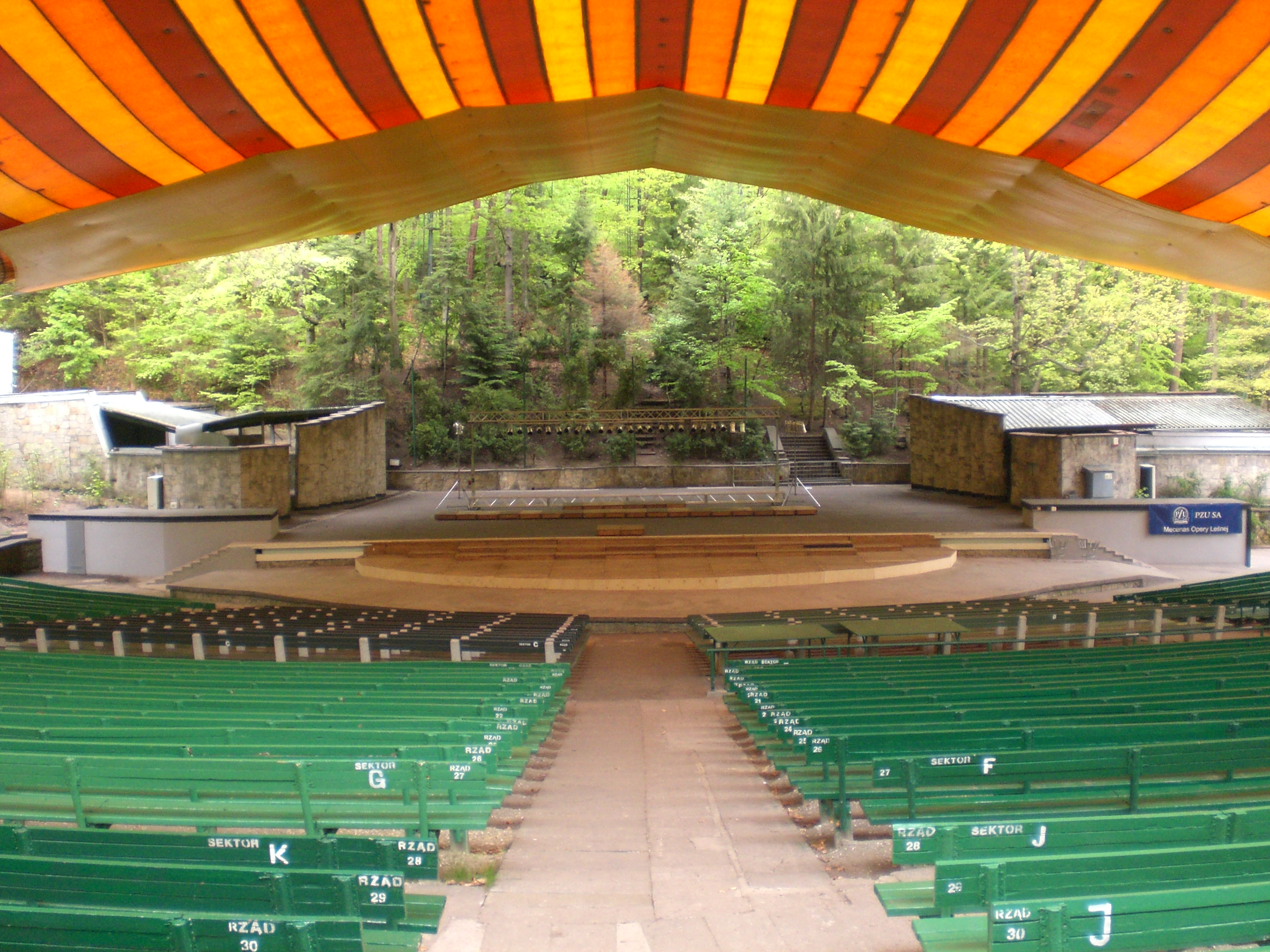
Forest Opera stage in Sopot (2007)

Built in 1909 (when the location was part of Germany), the amphitheatre is used for various entertainment events and shows, including opera performances and song festivals. After World War I and almost till the end of World War II it was a place of operatic festivals (Zoppot Festspiele) and Sopot was recognised throughout Europe and frequently labelled as the Bayreuth of the North. During that time, mostly Wagnerian operas and his music dramas were performed regularly each year.

After World War II the Baltic State Opera held few performances each year at the Forest Opera between 1962 and 1977 (Aida in 1962, Halka in 1964, Der Zigeunerbaron in 1965, Swan Lake in 1968, Die Fledermaus in 1977), and sporadically outside this range (Tannhäuser in 2000).

Each year, starting from 1964 (only interrupted during the 1981–83 martial law era), the Sopot International Song Festival takes place at the Forest Opera, events being organized by the Ministry of Culture and Art in cooperation with the Polish Artistic Agency (PAGART). It was a music event transmitted to the Eastern bloc countries via television. Since 2017, TVN has been the producer of the festival.

The Forest Opera hosted the 1991 edition of the Miss Polski beauty pageant on 19 July 1991, and was also the venue of Whitney Houston's only live concert in Poland, held on 22 August 1999 as part of her My Love Is Your Love World Tour. On 28 June 2001, the Munich Philharmonic Orchestra under James Levine gave a concert at the Forest Opera.

An attempt was made to reactivate the Sopot Wagner Festival on the 100th anniversary of the Forest Opera's creation (20 July 2009), with the special event of a single concert performance of Das Rheingold, conducted by Jan Latham-Konig – for the first time since the end of the 1930s. The announced intention of the organizers is staging the remaining parts of Der Ring des Nibelungen in Sopot (including some of them in the Forest Opera) within the next few years.

From September 2009 until June 2012 Sopot Forest Opera underwent extensive renovation and modernization.

== Performances in Zoppot Festspiele ==
- 1914: Der Freischütz
- 1921: Fidelio
- 1922: Siegfried
- 1924: Die Walküre
- 1925: Tannhäuser
- 1926: Lohengrin
- 1927: Götterdämmerung
- 1928: Parsifal
- 1929: Die Meistersinger von Nürnberg
- 1931: Der Ring des Nibelungen (the cycle without Das Rheingold)
- 1932: Lohengrin
- 1933: Tannhäuser
- 1934: Die Meistersinger von Nürnberg and Die Walküre
- 1935: Die Meistersinger von Nürnberg and Rienzi
- 1936: Parsifal and Rienzi
- 1937: Parsifal and Lohengrin
- 1938: Lohengrin and Der Ring des Nibelungen (whole cycle)
- 1939: Tannhäuser and Der Ring des Nibelungen (whole cycle)
- 1940: Tannhäuser and Der fliegende Holländer
- 1941: Die Meistersinger von Nürnberg
- 1942: Die Meistersinger von Nürnberg and Siegfried
- 1944: Siegfried

== Sources ==
The Bayreuth of the North by Einhard Luther, in Opera (Autumn, 1966), 7.

- BART Artistic Agency
