= Moscow Calling =

- Original cover art

Studio album by Gorky Park
- Released: 1992; March 29, 1993
- Genres: Hard rock, glam metal
- Length: 57:28
- Language: English
- Label: BMG International, N.V.

Gorky Park chronology
Gorky Park (1989)	Moscow Calling (1992)	Stare (1996)

Alternative Cover
- Alternative cover art for U.S. and European release

Singles from Gorky Park
- 1. "Moscow Calling" Released: 1992

Professional ratings
Review scores
Source	Rating
Allmusic	2.5/5 stars

Moscow Сalling (titled Gorky Park 2 in many countries, including Russia) is the second album by Russian rock band Gorky Park. It was released between 1992 and 1993. Four music videos were made for the album: "Moscow Calling", "Stranger", "I’m Going Down" and "Tell Me Why".

== Reception ==
After Nikolai Noskov left the band in 1990, bassist Alexander Minkov took over as lead vocalist. AllMusic's Jason Anderson notes his "faux Joe Elliot vocals" and overall finds the album "at times extremely reminiscent of Pyromania-era Def Leppard".

The album went completely unnoticed in the U.S., where the band's MTV hit "Bang" was long forgotten by most rock enthusiasts and the taste of the audience had changed, but was well received in other countries. It sold 500,000 copies outside the United States, notably becoming Platinum in Denmark.

== Track listing ==
No.	Title	Lyrics	Music	Length
1.	"Moscow Calling"	Alexei Belov	Alexei Belov	5:09
2.	"All Roads"	Steve Diamdon	Alexei Belov	5:10
3.	"Politics Of Love"	Alexei Belov	Alexei Belov	4:03
4.	"Tomorrow"	Alexei Belov, Struan Oglanby	Alexei Belov	5:55
5.	"Stranger"	Alexei Belov	Alexei Belov	4:49
6.	"Volga Boatman" (Instrumental)		Gorky Park, based on "The Song of the Volga Boatmen"	1:14
7.	"Strike"	Alexei Belov	Alexei Belov	3:50
8.	"Welcome To The Gorky Park"	Fee Waybill	Alexei Belov	4:21
9.	"Two Candles"	Alexei Belov, Andrew Grigoriev, Fee Waybill	Jan Janenkov, Alexandre Minkov, Alexei Belov	5:01
10.	"I’m Going Down"	Struan Oglanby	Alexei Belov	4:30
11.	"City Of Pain" (bonus on CD & MC))	Alexei Belov, Kevin Roberts	Alexei Belov	4:57
12.	"Don’t Pull The Trigger" (bonus on CD & MC))	Alexei Belov, Fee Waybill	Alexei Belov	4:55
13.	"Tell Me Why"	Todd Meagher	Alexei Belov	3:25

== Personnel ==
Band members

- Alexandre "Big Sasha" Minkov — lead vocals, bass guitar
- Alexei Belov — guitar, keyboards, backing vocals
- Alexandre "Jan" Janenkov (Alexander "Yan" Yanenkov) — guitar
- Alexandre "Little Sasha" Lvov — drums

Additional musicians

- Richard Marx — backing vocals on "Two Candles"
- Steve Lukather — guitar solo on "Don't Pull the Trigger"
- Scott Page — saxophone on "Tomorrow"
- Steve Farris — guitar solo on "Strike"
- Fee Waybill — backing vocals on multiple songs
- Dweezil Zappa — additional guitar

== Release dates ==
Country	Label	Year
EU	BMG; CNR Records	1992–1993
Russia	Moroz Records; M.I.R. Records; Soyuz; Nox Music	1992 (LP and CD); 1993 (CD); 1994 and 1996 (MC); 2000 (CD)
South East Asia	Pony Canyon	1992–1993
Japan	Nippon Crown	1992

== "Moscow Calling" (single) ==
"Moscow Calling"

Single by Gorky Park

from the album Moscow Calling
- Released: 21 November 1992 (Japan)
- Genre: Hard rock, glam metal

Gorky Park singles chronology
"Try to Find Me" (1990)	"Moscow Calling" (1992)	"Stare" (1996)

"Moscow Calling" is a song by the Russian rock band Gorky Park, released in 1992 as the lead single from the band's second album Moscow Calling.

=== Track listings ===
CD (Nippon Crown CRDP-56, Japan)
No.	Title	Length
1.	"Moscow Calling"
2.	"Welcome To The Gorky Park"

=== Selected release dates ===
Country	Label	Year
Japan	Nippon Crown	21 November 1992 (CD)
