= Try to Find Me =

"Try To Find Me"

Single by Gorky Park

from the album Gorky Park
- Released: 1990
- Genre: Hard rock; glam metal
- Length: 5:11
- Label: Mercury (Cat. no.: 876 488)

Gorky Park singles chronology
"Bang" (1989)	"Try To Find Me" (1990)	"Moscow Calling" (1992)

"Try To Find Me" is a song by the Soviet rock band Gorky Park, released in 1990 as a single from the band's self-titled debut album. The song reached number 81 in the Billboard Hot 100, spending two weeks in the chart. This made the band the first Russian act ever to enter the Hot 100.

== Track listings ==
Cassette single (PolyGram Records, Inc.; Cat. no.: 876 488-4; EAN: 042287648841)
No.	Title	Length
1.	"Try to Find Me"
2.	"Bang"

== Charts ==
Chart (1990)	Position
US Hot 100 (Billboard)	81
