= Paranoia (album) =

Studio album by Nikolai Noskov
- Released: 1999
- Genres: Rock, Synth-pop; Dance-rock; New wave, Eurodance, Trip hop
- Length: 40:08
- Language: Russian
- Label: NOX Music
- Producer: Iosif Prigozhin

Nikolai Noskov chronology
Blazh (1998)	Paranoia (1999)	Dyshu tishinoi (2000)

Paranoia (Russian: Паранойя; also released under the title of Russian: Стёкла и бетон transl. Glass and Concrete) is the second studio album by Nikolai Noskov, released in 1999 in Russia.

== Album information and production ==
All music written by Nikolai Noskov unless otherwise stated.

== Track listing ==
No.	Title	Lyrics	Music	Transliteration (Translation)	Length
1.	"Паранойя"	Igor Brusentsev		Paranoia	3:49
2.	"Стёкла и бетон"	Igor Brusentsev		Styokla i beton' (Glass and Concrete)	4:00
3.	"Я тебя прошу"	Alexei Chulanskiy		Ya tebya proshu (I Implore You)	4:01
4.	"Белая ночь"	Igor Brusentsev		Belaya noch (White Night)	4:28
5.	"Снег"	Alexei Chulanskiy		Sneg (Snow)	4:28
6.	"Узнать тебя"	Alexei Chulanskiy		Uznat tebya (To Know You)	3:57
7.	"Примадонна"	Alla Pugacheva	Alla Pugacheva	Primadonna	3:34
8.	"Счастливей сна"	Alexei Chulanskiy		Schastlivei sna (Happier then Dreams)	4:00
9.	"Я — твой DJ"	Alexei Chulanskiy		Ya - tvoi DJ (I - your DJ)	4:01
10.	"Как прекрасен мир"	Igor Brusentsev		Kak prekrasen mir (How Lovely is the World)	3:16
Total length:					40:08
