= Gorky Park (album) =

Gorky Park 1

Studio album by Gorky Park
- Released: 1989
- Recorded: Little Mountain Studios (Room B), Vancouver; Kajem/Victory Studios, Gladwyne; Kajem/Victory East Studios, Philadelphia. Track #5 The Warehouse/J.E.M. Studios, Philadelphia & Sanctuary Sound Studios, New Jersey
- Genre: Glam metal
- Length: 51:21
- Language: English
- Label: Mercury
- Producer: Bruce Fairbairn (tracks 4, 6, 7 & 10), Jon Bon Jovi & Richie Sambora (track 5), Mitch Goldfarb & Gorky Park (all others)

Gorky Park chronology
Gorky Park 1 (1989)	Moscow Calling (1992–1993)

Singles from Gorky Park
- 1. "Bang" Released: 1989; 2. "Peace in Our Time" Released: 1989; 3. "Try to Find Me" Released: 1990

Professional ratings
Review scores
Source	Rating
Allmusic	4/5 stars

Gorky Park is the debut album by Russian hard rock band Gorky Park, released in 1989 by Mercury Records, after Jon Bon Jovi & Richie Sambora of Bon Jovi expressed interest in the band (and co-produced the album) and got them signed to Mercury, Bon Jovi's label. It features the band's first hit single, "Bang", that has a mix of Russian and English lyrics and was put into rotation on MTV.

== Track listing ==
- All music composed by Gorky Park, except where noted.
- Lyrics by Michael Berardi & Gregory Schwartz (1, 3, 8, 11), A.Grigoriev (2, 4), Jon Bon Jovi & Richie Sambora (5), Pete Townshend (6), J. Zocchi (7, 10), Karen Kavaleryan & Irina Antonian (9)
1. "Bang" – 4:47
2. "Try to Find Me" – 5:08
3. "Hit Me with the News" – 3:52
4. "Sometimes at Night" – 5:08
5. "Peace in Our Time" (Jon Bon Jovi, Richie Sambora) – 5:56
6. "My Generation" (Pete Townshend, includes Prokofiev's "Alexander Nevsky") – 4:44
7. "Within Your Eyes" – 4:55
8. "Child of the Wind" – 5:22
9. "Fortress" – 4:04
10. "Danger" – 3:30
11. "Action" – 3:55 (Bonus track on the CD and Cassette)

== Personnel ==
Band members

- Alexei Belov: lead guitar, balalaika, all keyboards, background vocals
- Nikolai Noskov: lead vocals, background vocals
- Alexander Minkov: bass, background vocals
- Yan Yanenkov: lead guitar, acoustic guitar, background vocals
- Alexander Lvov: drums, percussion, background vocals

Additional musicians

- Annette Hardeman, Gabriel Hardeman, Charlene Holloway, Paula Holloway: choir on "Try to Find Me"
- Jon Bon Jovi: vocals on "Peace in Our Time"
- Richie Sambora: electric guitar and background vocals on "Peace in Our Time"
- Tico Torres: drums on "Peace in Our Time"

== Charts ==
=== Album ===
Year	Chart	Position
1989	Billboard 200 (North America)	80
1989	Norwegian Albums Charts	9

=== Singles ===
Year	Title	Chart	Position
1989	"Bang"	Hot Mainstream Rock Tracks	41
1989	"Bang"	Norwegian Albums Charts	5
1990	"Try to Find Me"	Billboard Hot 100	81

== Clips ==
1. "Fortress" - the first video of the group, shot in Moscow in the autumn of 1988, the video combines staged scenes footage from the recording Studio and documentary Chronicles.
2. "Bang" (1989) - staging clip, place of conduct surveys - New York.
3. "My Generation" (1989) - clip combining staged scene, concert records and documentary historical Chronicles.
4. "Peace In Our Time" (1990) - concert video.

== Release history ==
Region	Date
United States	1989
United Kingdom	1989
Japan	1989
South Korea	1989
South Africa	1989
Mexico	1989
Netherlands	1989
West Germany	1989
SFR Yugoslavia	1990
The Soviet Union	1990

European copies of the album were also imported to Australia.

== Production ==
- All songs arranged by Gorky Park.
- Tracks 4, 6, 7, & 10 produced by Bruce Fairbairn. Recorded & Mixed by Bruce Fairbairn & Mike Fraser, with recording assistance by Ken Lomas.
- Track 5 produced by Jon Bon Jovi & Richie Sambora. Recorded & Mixed by Obie O'Brien, with recording assistance by John "Joy Boy" Moyer & Nick "The Pig" DiDia.
- All other tracks produced, recorded & mixed by Mitch Goldfarb & Gorky Park, with recording assistance by Brian Stover, Brooke Hendricks, and Mike Cohn.
