= Protivofazza =

Studio album by Gorky Park
- Released: May 1998
- Recorded: MIR Studios, Los Angeles, USA, 1994–1996 GDRZ Studio-5, Moscow, Russia
- Genres: Hard rock; alternative rock
- Length: 48:00
- Language: English
- Label: Nox Music
- Producer: Gorky Park

Gorky Park chronology
| Stare (1996) | Protivofazza (1998) |

Singles from Gorky Park

Professional ratings
Review scores
| Source | Rating |
|---|---|
| Allmusic | 2/5 stars |

Protivofazza (English: Antiphase) is the fourth and final album by Russian rock band Gorky Park, released in 1998, originally under Nox Music in Russia.

== Background ==
Protivofazza was released two years after its predecessor Stare. Most songs from both albums were recorded in the same sessions in Los Angeles in 1994, because originally the band thought to release a double album (twenty-one songs were recorded and mixed that year), project that was finally discarded. In 1996, they quickly recorded only two new songs composed by Alexei Belov, to complete the fourth album. For this work, the group had softened its sound considerably, with an extensive use of keyboards instead of electric guitar in most songs.

For its concept and name "Protivofazza”, the band said: "There is a term in electronics, when one phase over the other flips and sound is not what it should be. When a person is swimming against the tide, the same thing happens. Roughly speaking, the antiphase – a contradiction to everything". According to them, the name would be close to each of their album they always swim against the current. Protivofazza was released only in Russia.

Two music videos were made for the album: "Jenny Loses Me" and "Liar".

== Track listing ==
All music is composed by Alexei Belov, except track # 9 (A.Belov & N.Kuzminih).

| No. | Title | Lyrics | Length |
|---|---|---|---|
| 1. | "Jenny Loses Me" | A. Johannes, N. Shneider | 3:43 |
| 2. | "Liar" | A. Belov | 4:22 |
| 3. | "Reaching" | A. Belov | 3:02 |
| 4. | "Far All We Can Say" | A. Johannes, N. Shneider | 4:43 |
| 5. | "Little Asian Girl" | A. Belov | 3:15 |
| 6. | "Wannabee" | A. Johannes, N. Shneider | 4:23 |
| 7. | "Burn Away" | A. Johannes, N. Shneider | 5:06 |
| 8. | "Uforia" | A. Johannes, N. Shneider | 3:03 |
| 9. | "Liquid Dream" (instrumental) | | 2:44 |
| 10. | "Back Down to the Ground" | A. Belov | 5:30 |
| 11. | "My Friend" (is dedicated to our friend Andrei Grigoriev) | A. Belov | 3:50 |
| 12. | "Moving to be Still" | A. Johannes, N. Shneider | 4:19 |
| Total length: | | | 48:00 |

== Personnel ==
Band members

- Alexander "Marshall" Minkov – vocals, bass guitar
- Alexei Belov – guitar
- Alexander "Jan" Janenkov – guitar
- Alexander Lvov – drums
- Nikolai Kuzminih – keyboards

Additional musicians

- Ashot Akopjan – duduk (track # 9)
- Ron Powel – percussion
- Moscow Philharmonic Orchestra – orchestral arrangements
