= Stare (album) =

Studio album by Gorky Park
- Released: May 20, 1996
- Recorded: MIR Studios, Los Angeles, USA GDRZ Studio-5, Moscow, Russia
- Genre: Hard rock, progressive rock
- Length: 51:58
- Language: English
- Label: Nox Music
- Producer: Gorky Park

Gorky Park chronology
Moscow Calling (1993)	Stare (1996)	Protivofazza (1998)

Singles from Gorky Park
- 1. "Stare" Released: 1996

Professional ratings
Review scores
Source	Rating
Allmusic	2/5 stars

Stare is the third album by Russian rock band Gorky Park, released in 1996, originally under Nox Music in Russia.

== Background ==
Before recording the album, the band began touring followed by Russia in 1994. The following year, they focus at their new studio in Los Angeles with new songs composed, many of them written by the duo of Alain Johannes and Natasha Shneider from Eleven band.

Shortly before the recording began, the band incorporates a keyboardist, Nikolai Kuzminih, due to the evolution to a more progressive rock style. At the same time, they invited English session guitarist Allan Holdsworth and drummer Ron Powel. Back in Russia, the mix was made by Erwin Musper at the GDRZ Studio-5 with the Moscow Philharmonic Orchestra.

The third album was released on May 20, 1996, followed by a great tour by Russia, featuring an image and sound more mature and contemporary. However, the album was a resounding commercial failure outside their native country, in a world dominated by other musical genres.

Four music videos was made for the album: "Stare", "Stop the World I Want to Get Off", "Ocean" and "Scared", which was directed by Sergei Bazhenov.

== Track listing ==
All music is composed by Alexei Belov, except track # 4 (A. Belov and A. Minkov) & track # 6 (N.Kuzminih)

No.	Title	Lyrics	Length
1.	"Stare"	A. Johannes, N. Shneider	4:58
2.	"California Promises"	A.Belov	3:56
3.	"Five Wheel Drive"	A.Johannes, N.Shneider	4:28
4.	"Ego"	A.Johannes, N.Shneider	5:53
5.	"Stop the World I Want to Get Off"	A.Belov	4:36
6.	"Taiga" (instrumental)		3:20
7.	"Don't Make Me Stay"	A.Belov	5:38
8.	"Live for…"	A.Belov	4:28
9.	"Scared"	A.Belov	5:47
10.	"Animal Shelter"	A.Johannes, N.Shneider	5:07
11.	"Ocean"	A.Belov	3:54
Total length:			51:58

== Personnel ==
Band members

- Alexandre "Big Sasha" Minkov — lead vocals, bass guitar
- Alexei Belov — guitar, keyboards, backing vocals
- Alexandre "Jan" Janenkov (Alexander "Yan" Yanenkov) — guitar
- Alexandre "Little Sasha" Lvov — drums
- Nikolai Kuzminih - keyboards

Additional musicians

- Allan Holdsworth - guitar [Solo] (track # 7)
- Dorothy Colman - harmonica (tracks # 8, 11)
- Dorothy Colman, Ester Nicholson, Latonya Reed - backing vocals (track # 5)
- Ron Powel - percussion
- Moscow Philharmonic Orchestra - orchestral arrangements
