= Gorky Park (band) =

Russian rock band

Gorky Park Парк Горького
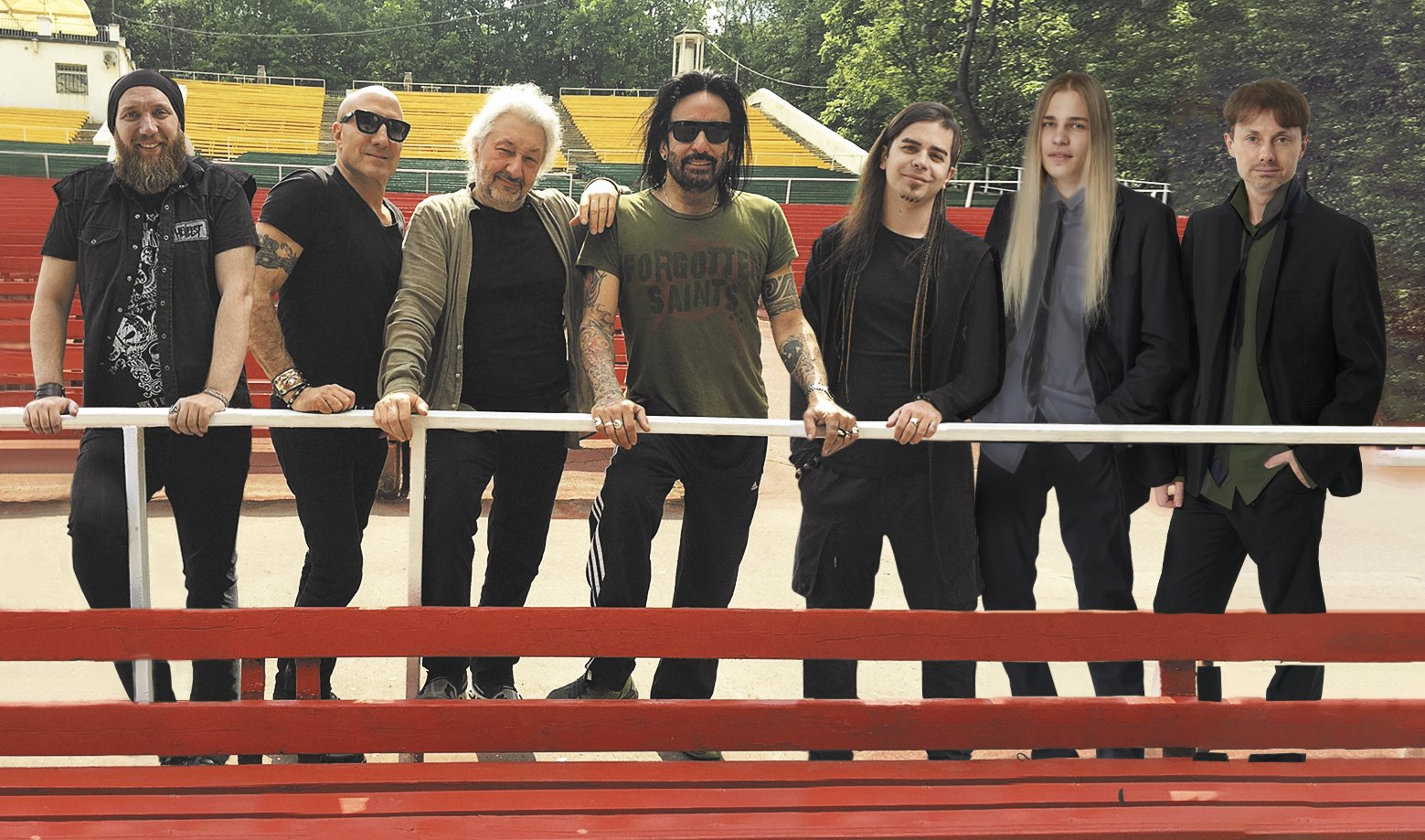

Background information
- Origin: Soviet Union; Russia
- Genres: Hard rock, glam metal
- Years active: 1987–1998, 2022–present (reunions: 1999, 2008, 2009, 2012, 2013, 2015, 2019)
- Labels: Mercury Records; PolyGram; SNC Records
- Members: Oleg Izotov; Tim Grigorovich; Sergey Arutyunov; Marco Mendoza; Kenny Aronoff; Oleg Hovrin
- Past members: Nikolai Noskov; Aleksandr Marshal; Alexey Belov; Yan Yanenkov; Alexander Lvov
- Website: gorkypark-band.ru

Gorky Park (international title), is a Soviet, American, and Russian rock band formed in 1987 by musician, composer, and producer Stas Namin at his producing centre SNC in the Gorky Park in Moscow.

The band made demo recordings at the SNC studio, and in the summer of 1988, Stas Namin organised Gorky Park's participation in Scorpions concerts in St. Petersburg._{.}In the autumn of 1988, he agreed with the president of the American guitar company Kramer, Dennis Berardi, that he would become the band's manager in the US. Namin and Berardi agreed with Jon Bon Jovi to help the Gorky Park band in the United States. In December 1988, by agreement with Namin, the Bon Jovi band and their manager Doc McGhee arrived in Moscow with Polygram's president Dick Asher, and at the Stas Namin Centre, an agreement was signed to release the band’s album in the United States. Namin sent the band members to record in the US at Berardi Studios in New Jersey, and after the recordings, he brought Gorky Park back to Moscow for a festival.

The band's participation in the Moscow Music Peace Festival, organised by Stas Namin and Doc McGhee and held on 12–13 August 1989 at the Luzhniki Stadium in Moscow, which was broadcast on MTV in 59 countries around the world, became the main springboard to popularity in the United States and other countries. Namin put Gorky Park on the festival broadcast along with Bon Jovi, Ozzy Osbourne, Mötley Crüe, Scorpions, Cinderella, Skid Row and other world stars. After the festival ^{[16]}, in August 1989, Polygram Records released Gorky Park's first studio album of the same name, Gorky Park, recorded entirely in English, which entered the American Billboard 200 chart in 1989 and brought the band worldwide fame. In 1990, when Namin sent Gorky Park on their first US tour, a conflict occurred within the band and it broke up.

The band's revival happened only 30 years later. Gorky Park's first performance with its new line-up took place in August 2022 in Moscow at the Russian Rock Festival, marking the 35th anniversary of the Stas Namin Centre – SNC at the Green Theatre in Gorky Park. The lead singer of the first line-up, Nikolai Noskov, was as the special guest at this performance.

== History ==
=== History of the Band's Formation (1986–1988) ===
In 1986 while touring the US and Canada with his band The Flowers, Stas decided to form a new band specifically for the Western market. He came up with the name for the future band based on the book Gorky Park, which Yoko Ono had gifted to him in New York. It was both the Moscow address for the new band — the studio of The Flowers in Moscow, in the Green Theatre of Gorky Park — and a world-famous brand. Returning to Moscow after touring the United States with The Flowers in October 1986, Namin and art designer Pavel Shegeryan created a logo for the future band — a hammer and sickle in the form of the Latin letters GP.

In early 1987, Namin began gathering musicians for his producer project for a new anglophone hard-n-heavy band called Gorky Park. The band members included Nikolai Noskov, a unique lead vocalist and songwriter, and four musicians whom Namin invited from his band The Flowers. Belov, Minkov, Yanenkov, and Lvov had already been working for several years with employment records in The Flowers.

During the first two years of its existence, the band Gorky Park rehearsed and recorded at the The Flowers band's base in Stas Namin's studio, located in the Green Theatre of the M. Gorky Park of Culture and Recreation. The repertoire was created exclusively in English. The first song by Gorky Park, which defined the style and genre of the band, was ‘Girl from New York City,’ which Stas Namin and Yevgeniy Yevtushenko wrote back in 1986 during a tour of the United States with The Flowers.

In the autumn of 1987, Namin invited American promoter Don King to Moscow, and he shot a film about the Stas Namin Centre and the first music video for the Gorky Park's song ‘Fortress,’ which was shown on the Don King Show in the United States.

In the summer of 1988, Namin arranged for Gorky Park to warm up for Scorpions during their tour in Leningrad. It was their concert debut. But the band's real career began in the fall of 1988, when the president of the Kramer Guitar company, Stas's friend Dennis Berardi, became the American manager of Gorky Park, and he and Stas Namin negotiated with Jon Bon Jovi to help GP's career in the United States.

When Namin was in New Jersey last April, he asked Jon Bon Jovi and Richie Sambora to help Gorky Park write songs for them in English. John and Richie, the creative force behind Bon Jovi, are always ready to give a hand — they have produced Cher, written songs for Ted Nugent, Aerosmith and Loverboy, and introduced Cinderella to PolyGram executives. They agreed to help Gorky Park

— Rob Tannenbaum, Rolling Stone magazine, 09.02.1989

Stas wanted to get Gorky Park a contract with an American record company, and the reason he turned to Dennis was trust.

— Jon Bon Jovi. SPIN magazine, November 1989

In December 1988, Namin invited Bon Jovi and their manager Doc McGhee, as well as PolyGram Records president Dick Asher, to Moscow. At the Stas Namin Centre, a direct GP contract was signed with PolyGram for the release of an album in the United States.

Thanks to Kramer, Stas Namin, and our manager Doc McGhee, the Gorky Park band got a contract with the American record company PolyGram. Richie and I agreed to write and produce a few songs for them — we did that.

— Jon Bon Jovi, SPIN magazine, November 1989

It was then that Stas Namin and Doc McGhee decided to hold an international rock festival in Luzhniki Stadium and dedicate it to the fight against drug addiction.

The band released a self-titled debut album in 1989, featuring initials "GP" stylized as a hammer and sickle on the cover. With the fall of the Iron Curtain and a growing interest in Soviets to western countries, Gorky Park soon became widely known. The band seemed to be a symbol of American-Russian friendship. The band's first video, "Bang", received MTV rotation. Their next single – a collaboration with Bon Jovi called "Peace in Our Time" – received rotation on mainstream radio stations

In 1989, after signing a contract with PolyGram Records, Stas sent the band to the United States to work with its manager Dennis Berardi and record at his brother Michael's studio in New Jersey.

In the summer of 1989, Namin brought the band back to Moscow to participate in the Moscow Music Peace Festival. This festival was organised by Stas Namin together with his friend, American music producer Doc McGhee, and took place on August 12 and 13 at the Luzhniki Stadium. Namin included Gorky Park and his Centre's bands Brigade S and Nuance in the concert alongside world stars Mötley Crüe, Bon Jovi, Scorpions, Ozzy Osbourne and others. Namin put Gorky Park on the MTV broadcast to 59 countries around the world, along with global superstars. It was this broadcast that became the main springboard for Gorky Park's international career.

If Russian rock impresario Stas Namin personally selected the members of Gorky Park in the USSR, then we can say with confidence that the Soviet rock scene was much more modern than we might think. And given the incredible success expected from the Make A Difference Foundation's satellite broadcast in August, this could well be the key to global domination for these guys, as it is expected to reach around 300 million people worldwide.

— The HARD REPORT

=== The Success (1989) ===
As a result, when Gorky Park's debut album of the same name was released in August 1989, the band was already well known in the United States thanks to the broadcast of the festival. Music videos for the songs ‘Bang’ and ‘My Generation’ were filmed in New York, for which Namin chose director Victor Ginzburg, who had Russian roots and with whom he later made the film Restless Garden. Thanks to the growing interest of the West in the Soviet Union after the fall of the Iron Curtain, Gorky Park soon gained widespread fame in the United States. The single ‘Bang’ made it into the Top 15 on American MTV and stayed there for two months, reaching number 3, making Gorky Park the first Russian band to enter the national American chart.

This turned out to be the first and last album recorded and released in the United States on Polygram Records and in the USSR on SNC Records by the original lineup gathered by Namin. The album itself reached number 80 on the Billboard 200, selling over 300,000 copies in the first three weeks. The next single after ‘Bang’ was ‘Peace in Our Time’, which, at Namin's request, was written by Jon Bon Jovi especially for Gorky Park and recorded together with Jon Bon Jovi and Richie Sambora.

Gorky Park joined the other acts from the Moscow Music Peace Festival in the compilation album Stairway to Heaven/Highway to Hell. This album included each band performing one song from an artist who died from, or a band who lost a member to, drug problems. Gorky Park's contribution was a cover of The Who's "My Generation". Namin's producing centre is referred to in the lyrics of the Scorpions hit Wind of Change. In 1989, guitar manufacturer Kramer introduced a balalaika-shaped Gorky Park signature model.

=== Breakup of the first lineup (1990) ===
After the festival and the release of the album on Polygram Records in 1990, Namin and Berardi organized a tour of the United States for the band, during which some of the musicians decided not to return to Russia, defected in the US. However, the lead singer, songwriter and front man of the band, Nikolai Noskov, did not agree with the musicians' decision and returned to Moscow.

The four musicians who remained in the United States, without Nikolai Noskov and Stas Namin remained active and kept releasing albums in the 1990s, with Minkov taking over as lead vocalist. However, their success in the United States began to decline, Polygram did not renew their contract, and they were unable to gain support from other major American record labels. Following this, they disappeared from radio airplay and MTV. 1992's Moscow Calling, produced by Fee Waybill, sold 500,000 copies outside the US.. Upon returning to Russia, they attempted to use the name ‘Gorky Park’, but the courts prohibited them from doing so. Despite this, new music under the Gorky Park name would continue to be released in Russia up until 1998. Their next album, Stare, was released in 1996, but only in Russia, followed up by a promotional tour of the former USSR states. In 1998, the band released Protivofazza. In 1999, Nikolay Noskov joined for the first time in nine years to sing "Bang". Alexander Minkov also left the band and started his solo career under the stage name Alexander Marshall. Gorky Park never officially claimed to disband, but became inactive after the release of Protivofazza.

=== Revival of the Gorky Park band ===
In the spring of 2022, after a thirty-year pause, Stas Namin decided to revive the brand he had created in the late 1980s and assembled a new Russian-American line-up for the Gorky Park band.

Gorky Park's first performance with the new line-up took place in August 2022 in Moscow at the Russian rock festival in the Green Theatre of Gorky Park (10,000 seats), timed to coincide with the 35th anniversary of the Stas Namin Centre – SNC. The special guest at this performance was the lead singer of the first line-up, Nikolai Noskov. He sang several songs with the band, including his famous ‘Bang’, passing the baton to the new top professional musicians of the band, and now often performs with them.

As a result, the new super team of Gorky Park includes Oleg Izotov, a lead guitarist, arranger, and lead vocalist well-known in Russia and abroad; Marco Mendoza, a world-famous American bass guitarist and lead vocalist. Sergey Arutyunov, lead vocalist, guitarist and vocalist Tim Grigorovich, and drummer Oleg Khovrin, with legendary Kenny Aronoff (USA) occasionally participating in foreign tours.

During its first two years, the band played several large concerts, including a solo concert at prestigious Crocus City Hall in 2024.

In 2023–2024, Gorky Park released two new digital albums, concert CD and DVD with new songs, music videos, and several singles. In April 2025, the band released a music video for the song ‘One World Freedom’. Their song ‘Their World / Our World’ was among the top 10 songs in the 30th Annual USA Songwriting Competition 2025.

== Members ==
=== Current lineup ===
- Oleg Izotov — lead guitar, lead vocals (2022—present)
- Tim Grigorovich — lead guitar, vocals (2023—present)
- Sergey Arutyunov – lead singer, harmonica (2023—present)
- Marco Mendoza — bass guitar, backing vocals (2022—present)
- Kenny Aronoff — drums (2022—present)
- Oleg Hovrin - drums (2024—present)

=== Past members ===
- Nikolai Noskov — lead vocals (1987—1990, 1999, 2012, 2022)
- Aleksandr Marshal – bass guitar (1987–1998; 1999, 2008, 2009, 2012, 2013, 2015, 2019), backing vocals (1987-1990; 1999, 2012), lead vocals (1990-1998, 1999, 2008, 2009, 2012, 2013, 2015, 2019)
- Alexey Belov – lead guitar, backing vocals (1987—1998; 1999, 2008, 2009, 2012, 2013, 2015, 2019), keyboards (1989—1994), rhythm guitar (2019)
- Yan Yanenkov — rhythm guitar, occasional backing vocals (1987—1998; 1999, 2008, 2009, 2012, 2013, 2015)
- Alexander "Little Sasha" Lvov — drums, backing vocals (studio) (1987–1998, 1999, 2008, 2009, 2012, 2013, 2015, 2019)
- Nikolai Kuzminykh – keyboards, backing vocals (1994—1998, 1999: died 2011)

== Discography ==
=== Studio albums ===
Year	Title	Label	US	Release
1989	Gorky Park	Mercury Records	80	Europe; USA; Russia
1992	Moscow Calling	BMG International, N.V.	—	Europe; USA; Russia
1996	Stare	Nox Music	—	Europe; USA; Russia
1998	Protivofazza	Nox	—	Russia

"—" – Album did not chart or was not released in country

=== Singles ===
Year	Title	Chart peaked	Album
Year	Title	US	Album
1989	"Bang"	—	Gorky Park
1989	"Try to Find Me"	81	Gorky Park
1989	"Peace in Our Time"	—	Gorky Park
1992	"Moscow Calling"	—	Moscow Calling
1996	"Stare"	—	Stare
2001	"Сделано в России" (Made in Russia)	—	—
2019	"Hello my Friend"	—	—

== Popular culture ==
- A snippet of "Bang" was used in HBO's Barry season-one finale. The song played in the scene where the Chechens were readying their weapons.
