= Po poyas v nebe =

Studio album by Nikolai Noskov
- Released: March 07 2006
- Genre: Rock; Pop-folk; Pop music Pop rock Progressive rock Reggae
- Length: 46:53
- Language: Russian
- Label: Misteria Zvuka; Moon Records Ukraine
- Producer: Nikolai Noskov

Nikolai Noskov chronology
Ocean of Love (2003)	Po poyas v nebe (2006)	It is not Worth It (2011)

Po poyas v nebe (Russian: По пояс в небе; transl. Waist Deep in the Sky) is the fourth studio album by Nikolai Noskov, released in 2006 in Russia. The presentation of the album took place on March 11, 2006 in the Kremlin Palace.

Noskov was inspired to write the album during his travels in India.

== Album information and production ==
All music written by Nikolai Noskov unless otherwise stated.

== Track listing ==
No.	Title	Lyrics	Transliteration (Translation)	Length
1.	"По пояс в небе"	Damir Yakubov	Po poyas v nebe (Waist Deep in the Sky)	5:25
2.	"На меньшее я не согласен"	Oleg Gegelskiy	Na menshee ya ne soglasen' (I will not agree to anything less)	4:20
3.	"Я не верю"	Igor Brusentsev	Ya ne veryu (I do not Believe)	4:50
4.	"Побудь со мной"	I. Brusentsev	Pobud so mnoi (Stay with Me)	4:31
5.	"Зачем"	Damir Yakubov, Nikolai Noskov	Zachem (Why)	5:47
6.	"Тальяночка"	Oleg Gegelskiy	Talyanochka	4:38
7.	"Любовь и еда"	Oleg Gegelskiy	Lyubov i eda (Love and Food)	3:39
8.	"Иду ко дну"	Oleg Gegelskiy	Idu ko dnu (Going Down)	3:35
9.	"Фенечка"	Oleg Gegelskiy	Fenechka	4:30
10.	"Спасибо"	Igor Brusentsev	Spasibo (Thank You)	5:08
Total length:				46:53
