= Blazh =

Studio album by Nikolai Noskov
- Released: 1999
- Genre: Rock, Synth-pop, Pop-folk, Dance-rock, New wave, Soul
- Length: 44:26
- Language: Russian
- Label: NOX Music, ORT-Records, Western Thunder Records, Sintez (Ukraine)
- Producer: Iosif Prigozhin

Nikolai Noskov chronology
| Blazh (1999) | Paranoia (1999) |

Blazh (Russian: Блажь transl. Blessed; also released under the title of Russian: Я тебя люблю transl. I love You) is the debut studio album by Nikolai Noskov, released in 1998 in Russia.

== Album information and production ==
All music written by Nikolai Noskov unless otherwise stated.

== Track listing ==
| No. | Title | Lyrics | Music | Transliteration (Translation) | Length |
|---|---|---|---|---|---|
| 1. | "Я тебя люблю" | Konstantin Arsenyev | | Ya teba lyublyu (I love You) | 4:07 |
| 2. | "Я не модный" | Aleksei Chulanskiy, Sergei Trofimov | | Ya ne modniy' (I am not Fashionable) | 3:41 |
| 3. | "Дай мне шанс" | Alexei Chulanskiy | Sergei Markin, Nikolai Noskov | Dai mne shans (Give me a Chance) | 5:00 |
| 4. | "Мой друг" | Aleksei Chulanskiy | | Moi drug (My Friend) | 4:51 |
| 5. | "Сердца крик" | D. Efimenko | | Serdtsa krik (Heart's Scream) | 4:29 |
| 6. | "На Руси" | Sergei Trofimov | | Na Rusi (In Ruthenia) | 5:09 |
| 7. | "Блажь" | Aleksei Chulanskiy | | Blazh (Blessed) | 3:44 |
| 8. | "Солнце" | Alexei Chulanskiy | | Solntse (Sun) | 3:53 |
| 9. | "Лунный танец" | Konstantin Arsenyev | | Lunniy tanets (Moon Dance) | 4:06 |
| 10. | "Ты не сахар" | Konstantin Arsenyev | | Ty ne sakhar (You are not Sugar) | 4:56 |
| Total length: | | | | | 44:26 |
