= Nikolai Noskov =

Russian singer (born 1956)

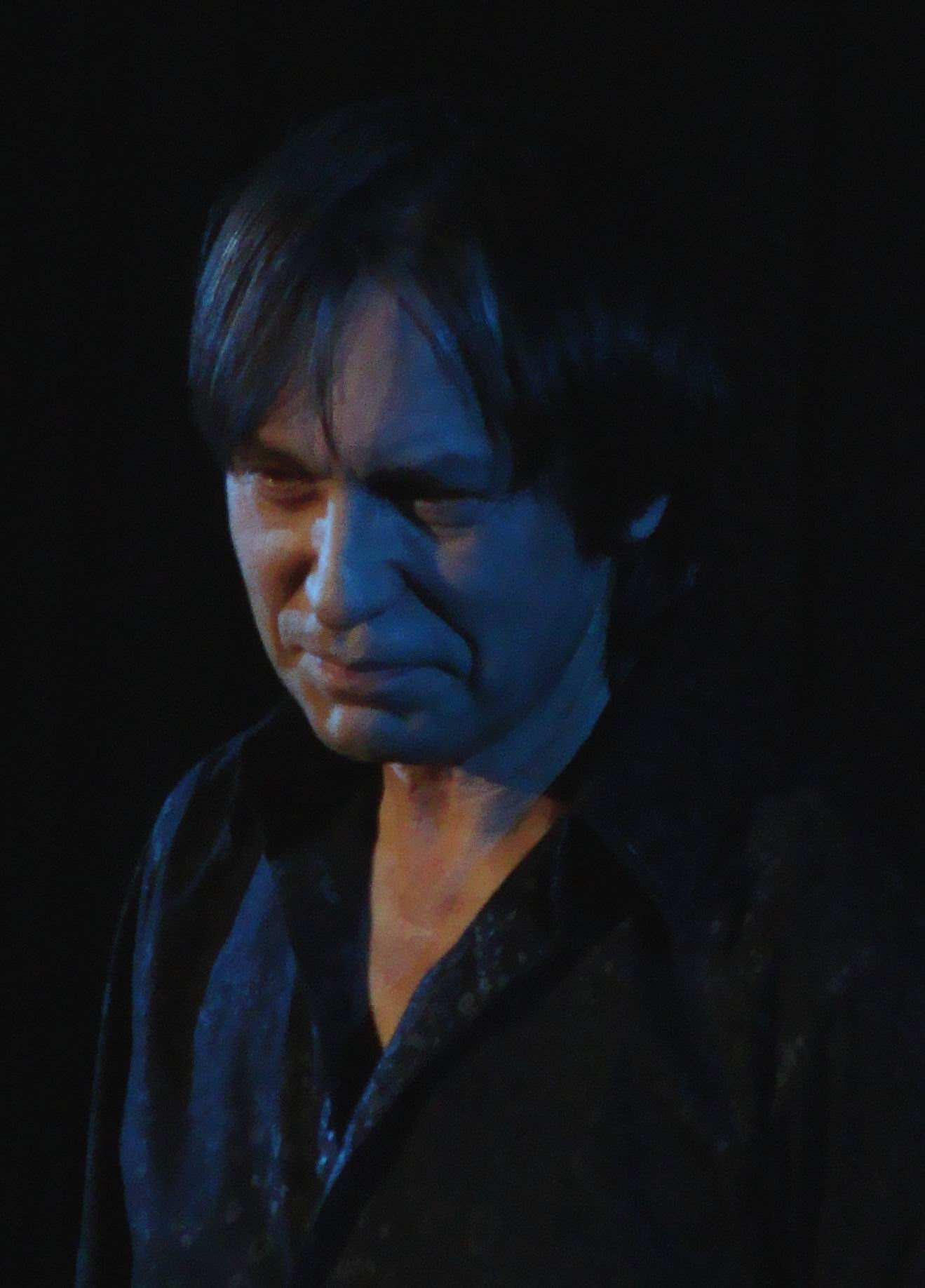
- Nikolai Noskov, 2009

Background information
- Born: Nikolai Ivanovich Noskov; 12 January 1956 (age 70); Gzhatsk, Russian SFSR, Soviet Union
- Genres: Glam rock; glam metal; hard rock; new wave; symphonic rock; progressive rock; pop; art rock; pop-folk; synth-pop; dance-rock; blue-eyed soul; R&B; funk; funk rock; folk; folk rock; trip hop; alternative rock
- Occupations: Singer; songwriter; record producer; filanpop; multi-instrumentalist
- Instruments: Vocals; guitar; drums
- Years active: 1981–present
- Labels: NOX Music; Misteriya Zvuka
- Website: nnoskov.ru

Nikolai Ivanovich Noskov (Russian: Николай Иванович Носков; born 12 January 1956) is a Russian singer and former vocalist of the hard rock band Gorky Park (between 1987 and 1990). He is a five-time winner of the Golden Gramophone Award. He was also a member of the Москва (Moscow) ensemble in the early 1980s, the band Гран-при (Grand Prix) in 1988 just before joining Gorky Park, and much later the band Николай (Nikolai) in the 1990s. Starting 1998, Noskov had a solo career releasing six solo albums. In 2015, he served as a jury in second season of the reality TV series Glavnaya Stsena.

== Early years ==
Born on January 12, 1956, in Gzhatsk (now renamed Gagarin), Nikolai Noskov comes from a working-class family. His father, Ivan, worked at a meat-processing factory, and his mother, Yekaterina, worked as a milkmaid and construction site worker. Noskov's boyhood gave him his first musical impressions, mainly from folk music played on traditional Russian instruments or sung by his mother. At the age of eight, Noskov and his family moved to a bigger city – Cherepovets, Vologda Oblast. There Nikolai finished school and afterwards served his term in the army.

Curious to explore, Kolya tried to play bayan, but as he was growing up, his attention shifted more and more firmly to singing – first in the school choir, then as a solo performer, winning one of his first awards at a local singing contest at the age of fourteen. As the lead singer of the school band, he performed the hits of Western rock bands like the Beatles and Creedence Clearwater Revival, bending to the wave of rock 'n' roll music, which was then surgent amid the Soviet youth. Posters depicting the members of Led Zeppelin and Pink Floyd came to relieve Shalyapin's portrait hung over Nikolai’s bed. His English was then undeveloped, and Nikolai simply transcribed what he heard on the original recording, transcribed it in Cyrillic letters. Later in his life, circumstances invited him to pay more attention to the language of rock 'n' roll.

A self-taught instrumentalist, Noskov plays the guitar, the piano, and the drums at a general versatility level. He even played the trumpet while in the army. Noskov never received an official vocal education, although he applied to the Gnesinykh state musical college. His knowledge of musical notation is also self-learned.

After being invited by an entrepreneur to an audition in Moscow, Noskov participated in several Moscow-based musical bands, then routinely dubbed "VIA" (Vocal-Instrumental Ensemble). However, none of these early engagements held him for long – Rovesniki (Peers) and Nadezhda (Hope) were soon left behind.

== Collaboration with Tukhmanov and work in Gorky Park ==
In 1980 Noskov met composer David Tukhmanov, who was then considered to be one of the most progressive in Soviet Union. Tukhmanov decided to create a hard rock band, Moskva (Moscow), with Noskov as lead singer. However, the band did not last long. After a few live performances and a recorded album called NLO (UFO) the band was suppressed and crushed by the authorities and the press. The sound of the band proved too hard for the Soviet listeners of the time. Importantly though, this was Noskov's first experience with professional studio work, led by Tukhmanov.

In 1987 Nikolai sang a few songs for musical film Island of Lost Ships. After some eight years of searching and singing at Moscow restaurants and clubs, a significant breakthrough occurred in Noskov's life: Park Gorkogo, loosely rendered as "Gorky Park", was formed by Stas Namin. Warming relations with the West and the era of mutual fraternizing enabled the creation of a Russian rock band that would sell in the USA. After playing in a festival headlined by the Scorpions, Gorky Park signed a contract with Polygram records. With Bruce Fairbairn as producer, Gorky Park started recording their eponymous debut album. The concept of the album was to win the hearts of the American audience with reverence to the Russian cultural roots while still playing hard rock/heavy metal. The album's lead single, "Bang!", was written by Noskov. The album (1989) went on to win some high-ranking places on the radio and MTV, and in Denmark it even acquired gold status. Gorky Park – Noskov included – toured in the USA and received interviews.

However, due to financial difficulties, tensions inside the band, overstrained vocal cords, incessant sleepless nights, and a pregnant wife at home, in 1990 Noskov left the band to return home to Moscow. Alexander Minkov assumed the role of lead vocalist, while still playing bass.

== Solo career ==
In 1994 Noskov was at crossroads. Starting a solo career from level ground again was a deliberated decision. Noskov gradually underwent some major changes of inner vision. Throughout his solo career his hard rock likings slowly but steadily transformed into deeper music closer to ethnic ballad art rock; and though in his most recent albums hard rhythms are discernible, they may be more precisely characterized as funk. After his album Mother Russia, Noskov dropped singing in English and started singing in Russian for Russian audiences with no "foreign bloke" pretenses.

... on my anniversary it was I who gathered Gorky Park for a reunion – Marshal excluded though ... And when I started singing "Bang!" I suddenly felt so far aloof from this song ... I felt that it did not stir my heart at all. I finished singing and asked myself: what was that for? Something from my past life, unbidden, some foreign language words ...

In 1998 he released his debut solo album Blazh. In 2002, he established a foundation for the support of ethnic music Wild Honey.

In 2006, he released his fourth album, Po poyas v nebe. Some songs from this album are eastern musical motives performed on the quray, a Bashkir reed flute.

In 2011 he sang Magomaev's song Мелодия on the television music show Property of the Republic and won the competition. In 2012 he recorded the album Без названия in Germany in the studio of producer Horst Schnebel. During the same year he sang in the 25th anniversary concert of Gorky Park. In 2015 he was a member of the jury in second season of reality TV series Glavnaya Stsena.

Now he is recording his seventh studio album, which is to be released in 2019; songs from the upcoming album are Нет ни годы, Оно того стоит, Седые дети and upcoming duet with singer IVAN.

In 2022, Noskov performed at the 35th anniversary of the Stas Namin Centre in a rock festival associated with figures supporting the Russian invasion of Ukraine.

== Personal life ==
Nikolai is married to his girlfriend, Marina, since 1978. He has a daughter, Katerina (born 1991), and granddaughters Miroslava (2015) and Valeria (2017).

In 2017, Nikolai was hospitalized with a thrombus in the cervical section, because of illness he suffered concerts.

== Discography ==
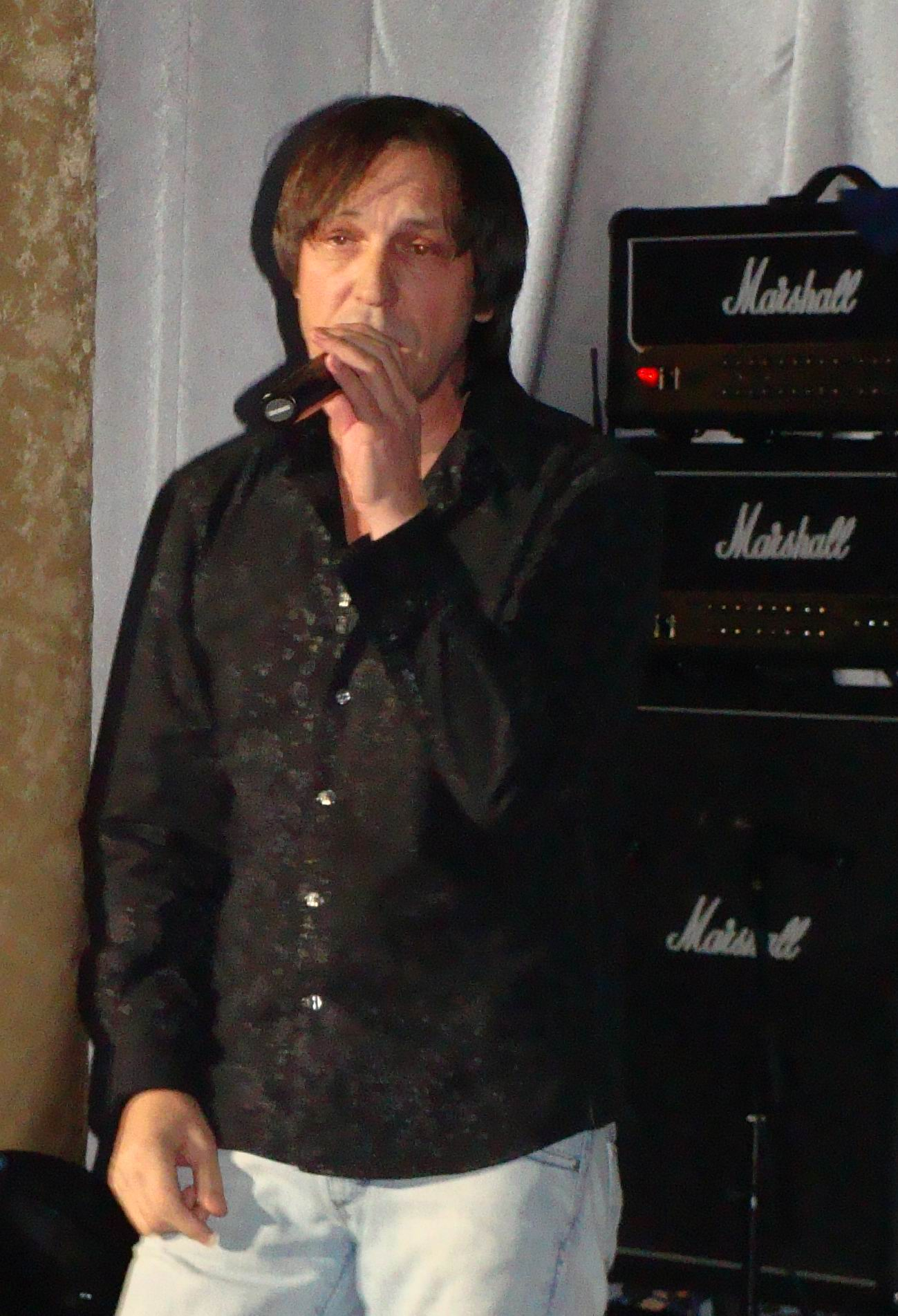
Nikolai Noskov (2009)

=== In bands and ensembles ===
Ensemble Moscow (Москва)

- НЛО (UFO, 1982)

Band Grand Prix (Гран-при)

- К теологии (EP) (1988)

Band Gorky Park

- Gorky Park (1989)

Band Nikolai (Николай)

- Mother Russia (1994)

=== Solo albums ===
- Я тебя люблю (I Love You, 1998), also titled Блажь (Whim)
- Стёкла и бетон (Glass and Concrete, 1999), also titled Паранойя (Paranoia)
- Дышу тишиной (Breathing the Silence, 2000)
- По пояс в небе (Waist-deep in the Sky, 2006)
- Оно того стоит (It's worth it, 2011, unreleased)
- Без названия (Untitled, 2012), also titled Мёд (Honey)
- Живой (Alive, 2019)

=== Compilations ===
- Лучшие песни в сопровождении симфонического оркестра (Best songs accompanied by a symphony orchestra, 2001)
- Лучшие песни (The Best Songs, 2002)
- Океан любви (Ocean of Love, 2003)
- Лучшие песни (The Best Songs, 2008)
- Дышу тишиной (DVD, Breathing the Silence)
- The Best (2016)

=== Singles ===
- "Ночь" ("Night", 1984, re-released in 2012)
- "Живой" (2019)

== Awards ==
- 1992 – Profi
- 1996–2015 – Golden Gramophone Award
  - 1996 for «Я не модный»
  - 1998 for «Я тебя люблю»
  - 1999 for «Паранойя»
  - 2000 for «Это здорово»
  - 2015 for «Это здорово» and 20th anniversary award
- 1998 – Ревнители русской словесности society of Pushkin
- 1999 – Ministry of Interior Medal "For Service in the Caucasus"
- 1999 – Medal of the Ministry of Defense for Strengthening Military Cooperation
- 2000 – Ovation (stylish soloist of the year)
- 2004 – Medal «For Assistance to the Ministry of Interior of Russia»
- 2006 – Medal «For the noble deeds for the glory of the fatherland»
- 2009 – FSB Awards in the category Music art for song Павшим друзьям. The singer worked with the Symphony Orchestra of the Russian FSB.
- 2018 – Meritorious Artist of the Russian Federation
