= Dyshu tishinoi =

Studio album by Nikolai Noskov
- Released: October 2000
- Genre: Rock, Pop music Progressive rock Crossover music
- Length: 49:27
- Language: Russian
- Label: NOX Music
- Producer: Iosif Prigozhin

Nikolai Noskov chronology
Paranoia (1998)	Dyshu tishinoi (2000)	Best Songs with the Symphonic Orchestra (2001)

Dyshu tishinoi (Russian: Дышу тишиной; transl. Breathing the Silence) is the third studio album by Nikolai Noskov, released in October 2000 in Russia. The presentation of the album took place on October 10, 2000, in the Kremlin Palace. The academic chamber orchestra Musica Viva took part in the recording of the album, which also accompanied Noskov during the presentation of the album.

== Album information and production ==
All music written by Nikolai Noskov unless otherwise stated.

== Track listing ==
No.	Title	Lyrics	Music	Transliteration (Translation)	Length
1.	"Дышу тишиной"	V. Kadyev		Dyshu tishinoi (Breathing the Silence)	3:57
2.	"Зимняя ночь"	Boris Pasternak	A. Balchev	Zimnyaya noch' (Winter Night)	3:46
3.	"Романс"	Nikolay Gumilyov	A. Balchev	Romans (Romance)	4:58
4.	"Это здорово"	I. Brusentsev		Eto zdorovo (It is Great)	4:11
5.	"Исповедь"	D. Korotaev		Ispoved (Confession)	3:38
6.	"Снег"	A. Chulanskiy		Sneg (Snow)	4:54
7.	"Доброй ночи"	A. Chulanskiy; N. Noskov		Dobroi nochi (Good Night)	5:06
8.	"Дай мне шанс"	A. Chulanskiy	S. Markin	Dai mne shans (Give Me a Chance)	5:48
9.	"Узнать тебя"	A. Chulanskiy		Uznat teba (To Know You)	5:13
10.	"Мой друг"	A. Chulanskiy		Moi drug (My Friend)	4:59
11.	"В рай"	Heinrich Heine (translated by V. Levik)		V rai (Into Heaven)	3:48
12.	"Это здорово (music video)"			Eto zdorovo (It is Great)
Total length:					49:27
