= Stas Namin =

Russian rock musician and cult figure (born 1951)

Stas Namin Стас Намин
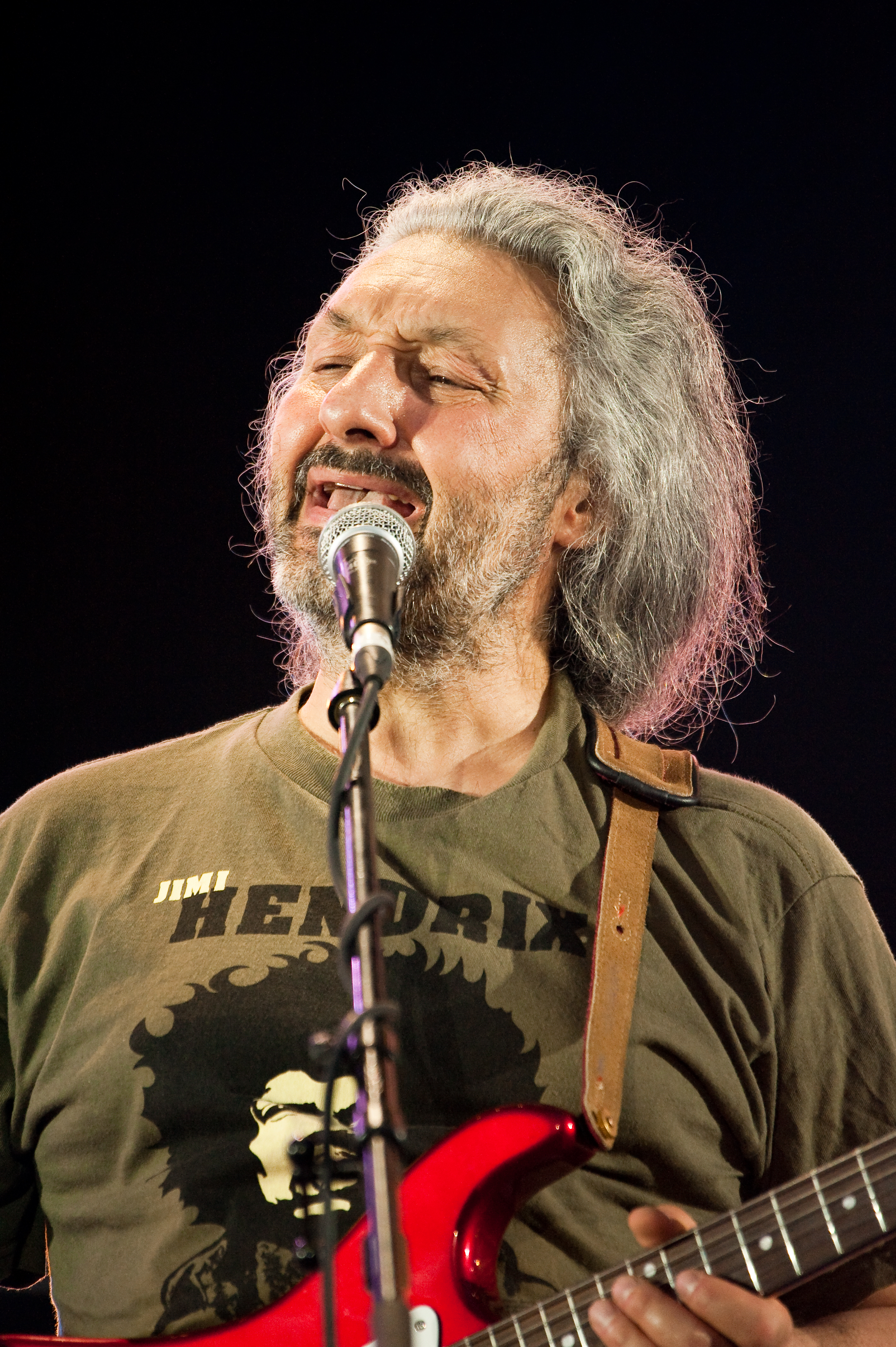
- 2009 photo

Background information
- Born: Anastas Alekseevich Mikoyan; 8 November 1951 (age 74); Moscow, Russian SFSR, Soviet Union (present-day Russia)
- Genres: Art rock; blues rock; symphony; mixed genres
- Occupations: Musician; composer; record producer; artist; photographer; theatre director; film director
- Instruments: Guitar; sitar; keyboards
- Years active: 1964–present
- Website: stasnamin.com

Anastas Alekseevich Mikoyan (Note: Russian: Анастас Алексеевич Микоян, romanized: Anastas Alekseyevich Mikoyan; Armenian: Անաստաս Միկոյան, romanized: Anastas Mikoyan) (born November 8, 1951, known professionally as Stas Namin) (Note: Russian: Стас Намин, romanized: Stas Namin; Armenian: Ստաս Նամին, romanized: Stas Namin) is a Russian rock musician known as the leader of the popular Soviet music group Tsvety (Russian: Цветы, lit. 'The Flowers'). He is also a composer, actor, record producer, and director, and lends his name to the theatre he created in Moscow, the Stas Namin Music and Drama Theatre (Russian: Театр музыки и драмы Стаса Намина, romanized: Teatr muzyki i dramy Stasa Namina, also known simply as Stas Namin Theatre).

== Background ==
=== Early years ===
Stas Namin was born on 8 November 1951 in Moscow. He is the grandson of Soviet politician of Armenian heritage Anastas Mikoyan. He spent his early childhood years with his parents on military bases, as his father Aleksey was an air force pilot, a veteran of World War II. His mother was a music historian and writer, and Dmitry Shostakovich, Aram Khachaturian, Mstislav Rostropovich, Alfred Schnittke and other celebrated musicians were all guests in the family's house. Namin's first music teacher was the composer Arno Babajanian.

Namin began school at age six. Four years later he entered the Suvorov Military School in Moscow, where he would receive seven years of military education.

=== 1960s ===
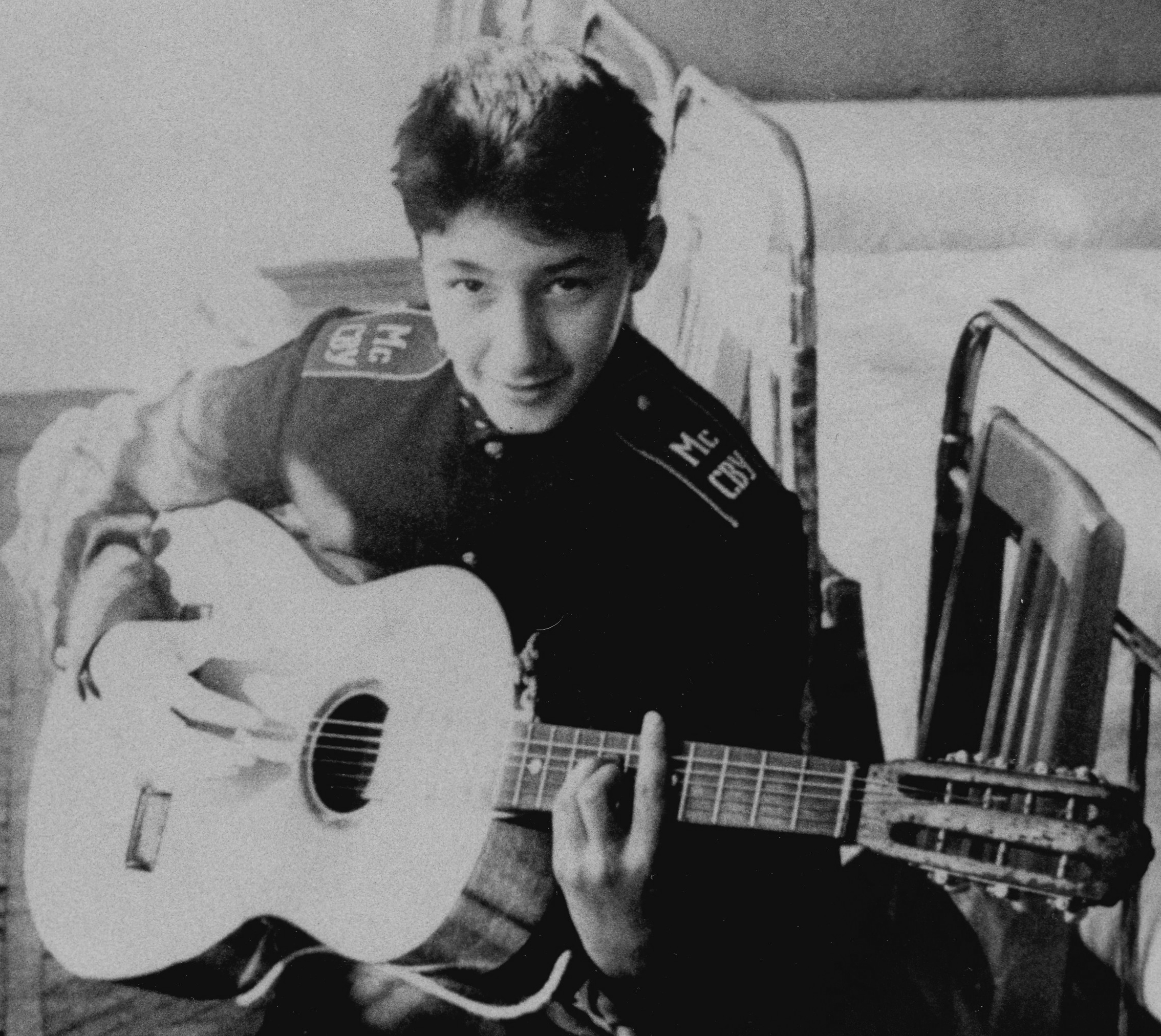
Stas Namin in Military School, 1964

While studying in the Suvorov School, Namin first hears The Beatles and The Rolling Stones and becomes involved with rock music.

- 1964 Namin forms his first band at military school, Charodei (the Magicians).
- 1967 Namin forms the band Politburo.
- 1969 Namin enters the Institute of Foreign Languages and becomes soloist and guitarist in the band Bliki (The Glimmers). Intrigued by the hippie movement's "flower children" rebellion against the existing order of society and inspired by the legendary Woodstock Festival, in late 1969 he forms a new band, the Flowers, which later becomes the first Soviet supergroup, in effect launching the rock-music movement in Soviet society.

=== 1970s ===
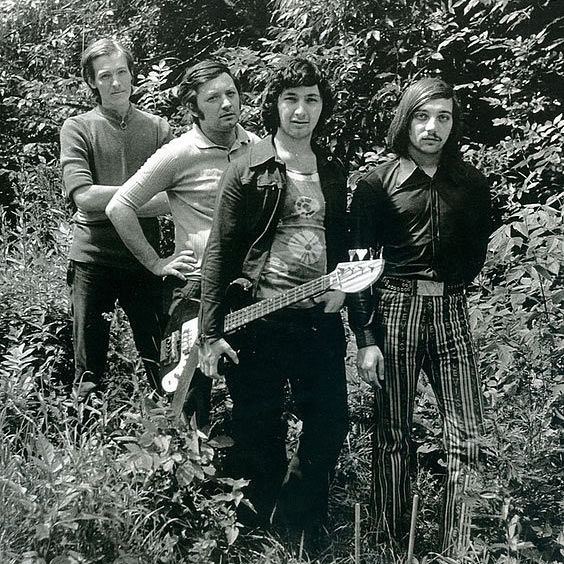
The Flowers. First single sold 7 million copies. 1972

- 1973 The Flowers release their first single on the Melodiya label as a student ensemble. Unexpectedly, the record sells an unprecedented seven million copies.
- 1974 The Flowers release their second, equally successful, single. The Moscow press names the Flowers "the Soviet Beatles", and Namin and his band begin touring professionally.
- 1975 The USSR Ministry of Culture bans the Flowers and use of the band's name for "promoting of Western ideology and the hippie movement".

Namin makes use of his forced hiatus from the band to finish studies at Moscow State University, where he’d matriculated in 1972. During this time, he’s in constant contact with dissident, nonconformist poets, writers and artists banned by the regime: Anatoly Zverev, Oleg Tselkov, Anatoly Brusilovsky, Joseph Kiblitsky, Alena Basilova, Venedikt Erofeev, Genrikh Sapgir, Yuz Aleshkovsky and others. Influenced by the Beatles and a visit to Moscow by Bhaktivedanta Swami Prabhupada, Namin becomes involved in Indian music and Vedic culture.

- 1976 Namin reunites his band, and the Flowers begin appearing again without their forbidden name, as the Stas Namin Group.
- 1977 The Stas Namin Group releases its first single, which enjoys previous success, but the group remains officially banned.
- 1978–79 The singles "Too Early to Say Good-Bye", "Summer Evening" and others, now classics of their genre, are released.

=== 1980s ===
- 1980 During the "thaw" in Soviet ideology brought on by the Olympic Games, the Stas Namin Group manages to release its first solo album in ten years, Hymn to the Sun, and make its first TV appearance.
- 1981 Namin meets and performs with Harry Belafonte in Moscow and joins the international organization Artists for Peace on the latter's invitation. Namin's song "Yurmala" enjoys country-wide popularity.

To enthusiastic reviews by Time and Stern magazines, Namin organizes the first rock festival in Yerevan. After this the KGB forbids him from working and confiscates his passport, and the General Prosecutor seeks a pretext to open criminal proceedings against the group.

- 1982 Under serious political pressure and a complete creative ban from the regime, Namin writes songs of harsh social and political orientation; these are naturally rejected by censors and remain unpublished in the Soviet Union. The authorities now regard everything Namin writes, says and does as an act of dissidence. Even his pop song "We Wish You Happiness!", now a classic hit of thirty years’ standing, is forbidden for three years.

Namin meets composer Georgy Sviridov and shows him his music. Remarking on Namin’s vivid, expressive melodies and their unusual developments, Sviridov advises him not to abandon music despite his problems with the authorities.
Due to the bans, which make performing rock music entirely impossible, Namin finally decides to change his profession, entering the High Courses for Scriptwriters and Film Directors. There he studies under professors Lev Gumilyov, Paola Volkova, Anatoly Vasilyev, Alexander Mitta and other outstanding personalities. He will remain in close friendship with them long after graduation.

- 1983 Namin shoots his coursework, which the examination commission rejects, accusing it of promoting Western ideological influence.

He composes a new series of songs with texts by semi-forbidden poets Yevgeny Yevtushenko, Andrei Voznesensky, David Samoilov, Nikolai Rubtsov, Andrei Bitov and others. This new repertoire of the Flowers is banned even from live concert performance. Only once does the group manage to illegally perform and record the songs: on local television in Alma Ata.

- 1984 Namin graduates from the Higher Courses for Screenwriters and Directors of USSR Goskino, where in fulfillment of his coursework he mounts his first stage productions. These are rejected by the commission on ideological grounds.

As his diploma work, Namin shoots the country’s first music video on his song "Old New Year" (lyrics: Andrei Voznesensky), which has an openly political subtext. This work is also rejected and Namin is refused his diploma. Forbidden in the USSR, the video is first aired on American MTV in 1986.

- 1985 During a youth and student festival in Moscow, Namin receives visits at his home without authorization from the KGB. Visitors include Michel Legrand, Mikis Theodorakis, Udo Lindenberg, David Woollcombe, Dean Reed and other foreign musicians, with whom Namin enters into joint creative projects without the Ministry of Culture's sanction. He records the double album "We Wish You Happiness!", which is banned in the USSR. At a specially convened collegium, the Ministry of Culture officially accuses Namin and his group of supporting the policies of the Pentagon.

Andrei Voznesensky invites Namin to his dacha in Peredelkino and introduces him to legendary American beat-generation poet Allen Ginsberg.

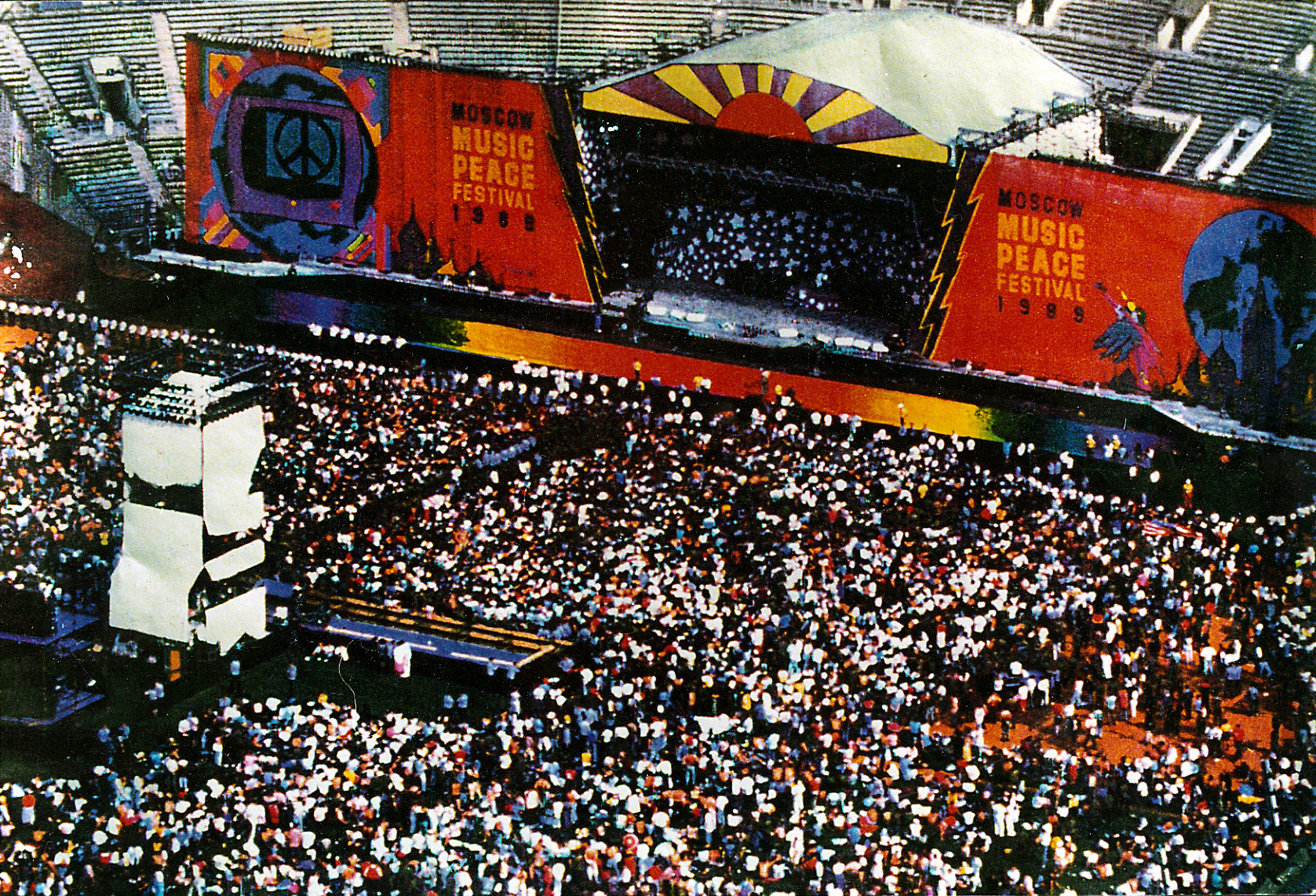
Moscow Peace Festival, 1989

- 1986 Only after Mikhail Gorbachev's rise to power, the beginning of Perestroika and a half-year-long scandal is the Stas Namin Group finally able to perform in the West. The band makes a month-and-a-half-long tour through eighteen cities of the US and Canada, performing exclusively for local audiences. Namin meets and performs with world-class rock musicians at UN headquarters in New York, the Kennedy Center in Washington and other prestigious venues.

After a concert and press conference at the Limelight in Manhattan on John Lennon’s birthday, followed by a press conference with the Flowers at the Hard Rock Café, Yoko Ono invites Namin to her and Lennon’s legendary apartment in the Dakota Building, where they spend many hours conversing about Lennon’s life and creative work.
In December, on invitation of Peter Gabriel, Namin performs at the Japan Aid festival in Japan together with Gabriel, Steven Van Zandt, Lou Reed, Jackson Browne and other world-renowned rock stars. Then the group tours freely throughout Europe, Africa, Australia, North and South America and Japan, completing a world tour in four years.
While in Japan, Namin and Gabriel decide to create alternative music companies. Gabriel creates Real World Records to support ethnic musicians throughout the world, and Namin creates the Stas Namin Centre (SNC) to support musicians, artists and poets forbidden by the Soviet regime.

- 1987 The alternative culture center SNC opens its doors in Moscow's Gorky Park without any official permission or documentation. Here Namin gathers talented banned musicians as well as progressive poets, artists and designers. The SNC becomes the country's only "factory" for new free art resembling Andy Warhol's studio in New York. Frank Zappa christens it "the Russian Bauhaus". The centre's visitors include Pink Floyd, U2, Quincy Jones, Peter Gabriel, Annie Lennox, Brian May, Ringo Starr, Robert De Niro, Arnold Schwarzenegger and many others. Inspired by the free, innovative atmosphere at the Centre in Gorky Park in the early 1990s, the rock band Scorpions writes its hit "Wind of Change", whose Russian lyrics are penned by Namin at their request.

Here Namin creates his new band Gorky Park, the first and only Russian rock group to achieve worldwide fame.

- 1988 Frank Zappa comes to Russia to meet Namin. They become close friends, and Zappa will make several more trips to Russia. Namin introduces Zappa to Alfred Schnittke and young musicians and artists, and Zappa shoots a film about the Stas Namin Centre.

On request of Academician of the USSR Academy of Sciences Evgeny Velikhov, Namin is nominated to the board of trustees of the International Foundation for the Survival and Development of Humanity, organized jointly by Soviet and American scientists and cultural figures in 1987.
While performing in New York, Namin is invited by Keith Richards to take part in recording his solo album Talk Is Cheap.

- 1989 On Namin's initiative, the first ever Soviet cultural-political delegation to Alaska is organized. At the same time, regular flights from Russia to Anchorage begin. Stas Namin and American pop star Eddie Money make a joint tour of Alaska.

In August Namin organizes the Moscow Music Peace Festival at Lenin Stadium (today’s Luzhniki), the first international rock festival in the USSR. Performing at the 200,000-spectator event are Bon Jovi, Mötley Crüe, Scorpions, Ozzy Osbourne, Skid Row, Cinderella and Namin’s new group Gorky Park. The Western press names the event "the Russian Woodstock" and heralds a new era of freedom in Russia. The festival was broadcast in 59 countries and named the world’s number one event of the year.
Namin creates the Moscow Symphony Orchestra (MSO), which gives a series of concerts in the Great Hall of the Moscow Conservatory and Tchaikovsky Concert Hall under the baton of music director Konstantin Krimets.

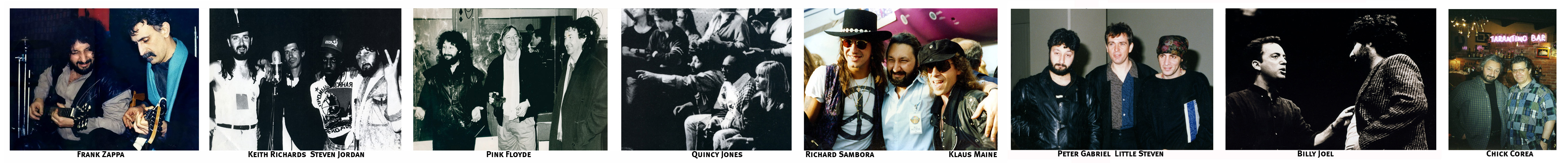
Guests of The Stas Namin Centre

=== 1990s ===
- 1990 Namin stops performing with the Flowers and turns his attention to social projects.

In the spring he creates the country’s first private record label, SNC Records, putting an end to the Melodiya firm’s longstanding monopoly and quickly conquering the Soviet market. SNC Records releases recordings of young, formerly banned Russian pop and rock musicians, as well as Western stars under license from Castle Communications (UK), for which it receives a Gold Disc award.
In the summer Namin holds the first international One World festival in Moscow. Simultaneously, his groups participate in the SOS Racisme festival in Paris.
The One World festival is conceived to unite performers of various nations, races and religions on a single stage. The festival’s overall aim is to overcome national, social and religious divisions between people of the planet and search for ways to achieve real international unity and brotherhood for all.
Vanderbilt University (Nashville, TN) founds a Stas Namin Scholarship.
Namin founds the agency Stanbet Sport to organize direct contracts between Soviet athletes and Western agents, putting an end to the state monopoly Goskomsport. Signers include tennis player Andrei Chesnokov and hockey players Viacheslav Fetisov and Alexei Kasatonov. These contracts pave the way for the world-level careers of many Soviet athletes.
Together with legendary boxer Victor Ageev, Namin helps create the Professional Boxing Federation of Russia.

- 1991 The Moscow Symphony Orchestra gives a series of concerts of symphonic, chamber and opera music in the Great Hall of the Moscow Conservatory and Tchaikovsky Concert Hall. Namin organizes the orchestra's joint tour of Great Britain with Electric Light Orchestra Part II.

With the August Putsch in progress, Namin returns from the concert by the BBC Symphony and Polyansky Chorus he’d organized at Royal Albert Hall to participate in the defense of the White House (federal government building) in Moscow. He personally conducts negotiations with tank commanders who’ve entered the city, persuading them to come over to the side of democracy. In autumn, at the request of his friends, artist Peter Max (USA) and musician Bob Dylan, Namin begins negotiations with the Soviet government to return the Schneerson Library to the Lubavitcher Hasidic Jews.
Namin organizes Russia’s first-ever Hanukah celebrations in the Moscow Kremlin and makes a tour of the country.
Namin organizes a Peter Max exhibition at the Russian Academy of Fine Arts in Moscow and the State Hermitage in St. Petersburg. In his turn, Peter Max presents contemporary Russian artists in the US.
Namin proposes an international project to Russia’s newly inaugurated president Boris Yeltsin: a worldwide tour of Lenin’s embalmed body. He suggests donating revenues from the project to pensioners, who believed in Lenin but ended up with nothing. The project is mentioned in major world publications, and Frank Zappa calls it the wittiest idea of recent times.

- 1992 In the spring Namin organizes the festival Rock from the Kremlin. For the first time, formerly forbidden rock musicians perform onstage in the State Kremlin Palace, a hall formerly restricted to official concerts and Communist Party congresses.

In the summer Namin organizes the first hot air balloon festival in Russia, which takes place in Red Square and Gorky Park.
On invitation of Simon Wiesenthal, Namin speaks on the theme "Tolerance and Society" at a UNESCO conference in Paris.
Namin creates the publishing house Stanbet Publishing for exclusive limited edition publications. These include the first Business in Russia catalogue, with a foreword by Acting Prime Minister of Russia Egor Gaidar; the catalogue 100 Films and 50 Directors of the 20th Century in Russia, which remains unique to this day; unique photography and fine art albums; magazines; and works of fiction.

- 1993 In the summer Namin organizes the Russian-Japanese fashion show Hello Russia! on Red Square, a venue formerly restricted to official state events.

On 22 August, two years after the August Putsch of 1991, the SNC organizes the concert Rock on the Barricades in front of the White House in Moscow in support of the defenders of democracy.
Namin delivers a course of lectures on Russian culture in US universities. He also visits his friend Frank Zappa in Los Angeles just a few months before the latter’s death. The two listen to and discuss Zappa’s latest symphonic album.
Namin creates the company Stanbet Development, a joint venture with Fuller Development, one of the largest real estate development companies in the US. Among its projects is the design and construction of the Russia Tower at Moscow International Business Centre, two multi-storey residential buildings in the center of Moscow and the Apple Orchard suburban club on the Rublyovskoe Highway.

- 1994 Namin creates a hot air balloon in the shape of the legendary Yellow Submarine. It's voted most popular at the Albuquerque International Balloon Fiesta (USA) and included in an encyclopedia of the world's best hot air balloons.
- 1995 In January Namin meets with John F. Kennedy Jr., whom he's known since the late 1980s. The two decide to start publishing their own magazines, Namin's in Russia and Kennedy's in the US. The magazines begin publication that year.
- 1996 The Stas Namin Centre organizes the For the Future of Free Russia tour, during which more than twenty of Russia's most popular theatre, cinema, and rock and pop music stars perform in sports arenas in sixteen Russian cities.

ZZ Top and Paul Young perform for the first time in Russia at the Stas Namin Centre.

- 1997 In June Namin, together with Sergei Solovyov and Aleksandr Abdulov, organizes the 20th Moscow International Film Festival, changes its location to the Pushkinsky Cinema and brings world film festival tradition to Russia by turning the theater's steps into a red carpet walkway for movie stars and VIP guests. He invites world-renowned stars to the event: Gina Lollobrigida, Sophia Loren, Alberto Sordi, Ornella Muti, Brigitte Nielsen, Geoffrey Rush and Robert De Niro.

Together with Dmitry Muratov, Namin creates modern Russia’s most progressive newspaper, Novaya gazeta, inviting Mikhail Gorbachev to be its co-founder.
Together with Thor Heyerdahl, Yuri Senkevich and friends, Namin organizes and takes part in a round-the-world journey via Easter Island.

- 1998 Namin creates the design and conception of a new restaurant, the Rhythm & Blues Café. Russian rock and jazz stars perform at its opening in Moscow. They're joined by the Jimi Hendrix Experience's Noel Redding and Thin Lizzy's Eric Bell, in Moscow to take part in recording Namin's solo album. The Rhythm & Blues Café becomes Russia's first original trademarked musical restaurant. The building's facade is decorated with portraits of rock stars, many of them autographed by the stars when visiting the restaurant. Such visitors include the Rolling Stones, Ringo Starr, Sting, Procol Harum, Brian May and others. Live music has been heard every day at the Rhythm & Blues Café for almost twenty years. In 2017 the Rhythm & Blues Café is awarded a gold medal for achievement in leadership, quality and innovation at the International Quality Summit (IQS) in New York.

Together with friends (Leonardo DiCaprio, Alanis Morissette, Jeffrey Sachs, Sergei Solovyov and others), Namin organizes an informal trip to Cuba, where he creates a series of photographic works later shown at the State Russian Museum and serving as the basis for the photo album Fulcrums.

- 1999 On invitation of Michael Butler, producer of the cult Broadway hippie-rock musical Hair, Namin flies to Los Angeles for the musical's new California production, and the two decide to create a Russian version of Hair in Moscow. In September Namin gathers a troupe including American actors, and in November Hair’s Russian-language premiere takes place. With the Second Chechen War underway, the authorities accuse Namin of pacifism and unpatriotism. The production's troupe will form the basis of the new Stas Namin Theatre, one of Russia's most popular theaters today.

Following its tour of Los Angeles and New York, Namin’s production of Hair is named one of the best in the world. Namin reunites the Flowers for work in the musical, the rock opera Jesus Christ Superstar and other shows.

=== 2000s ===
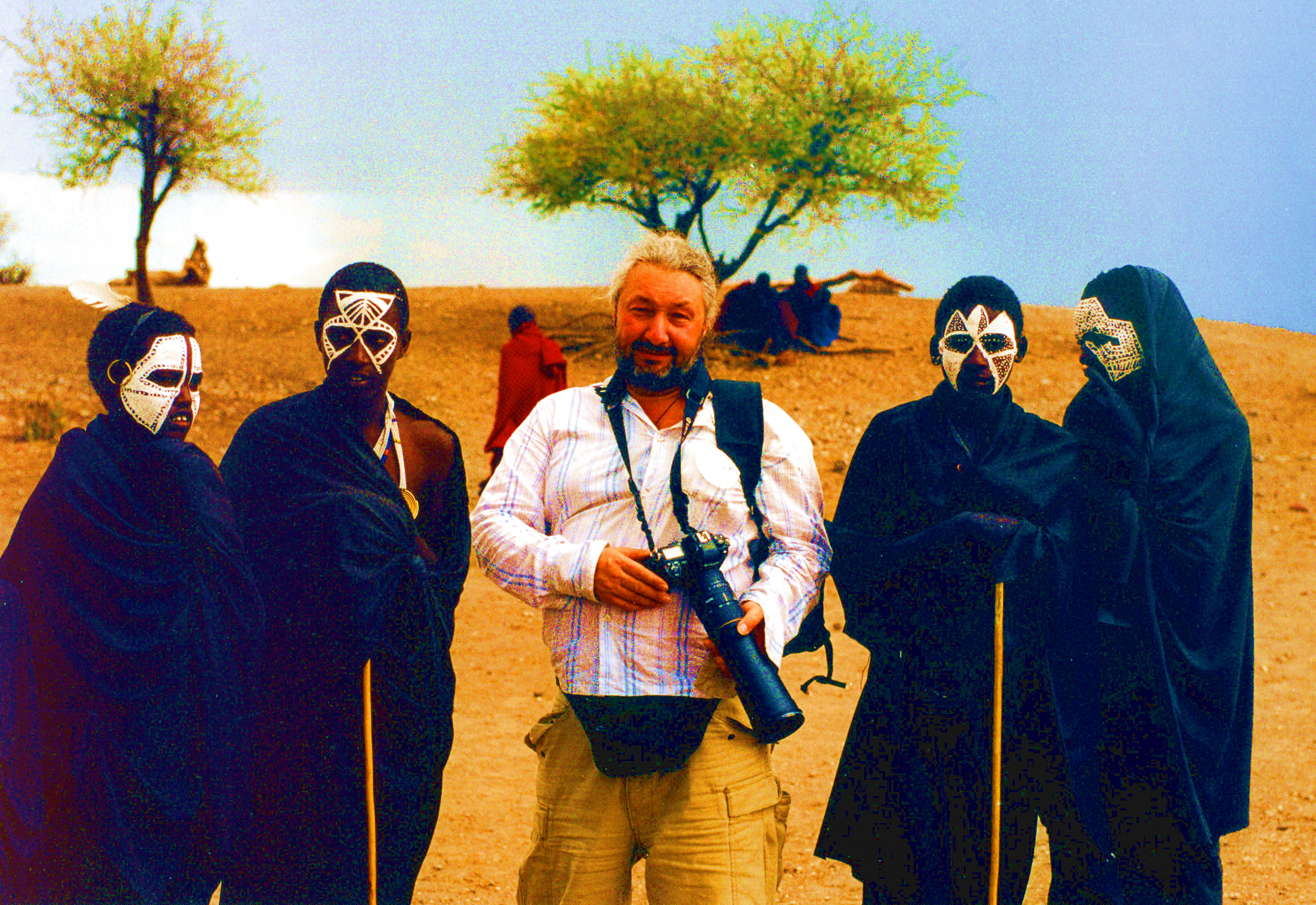
Stas Namin in Masai Village. Tanzania, Africa, 2002

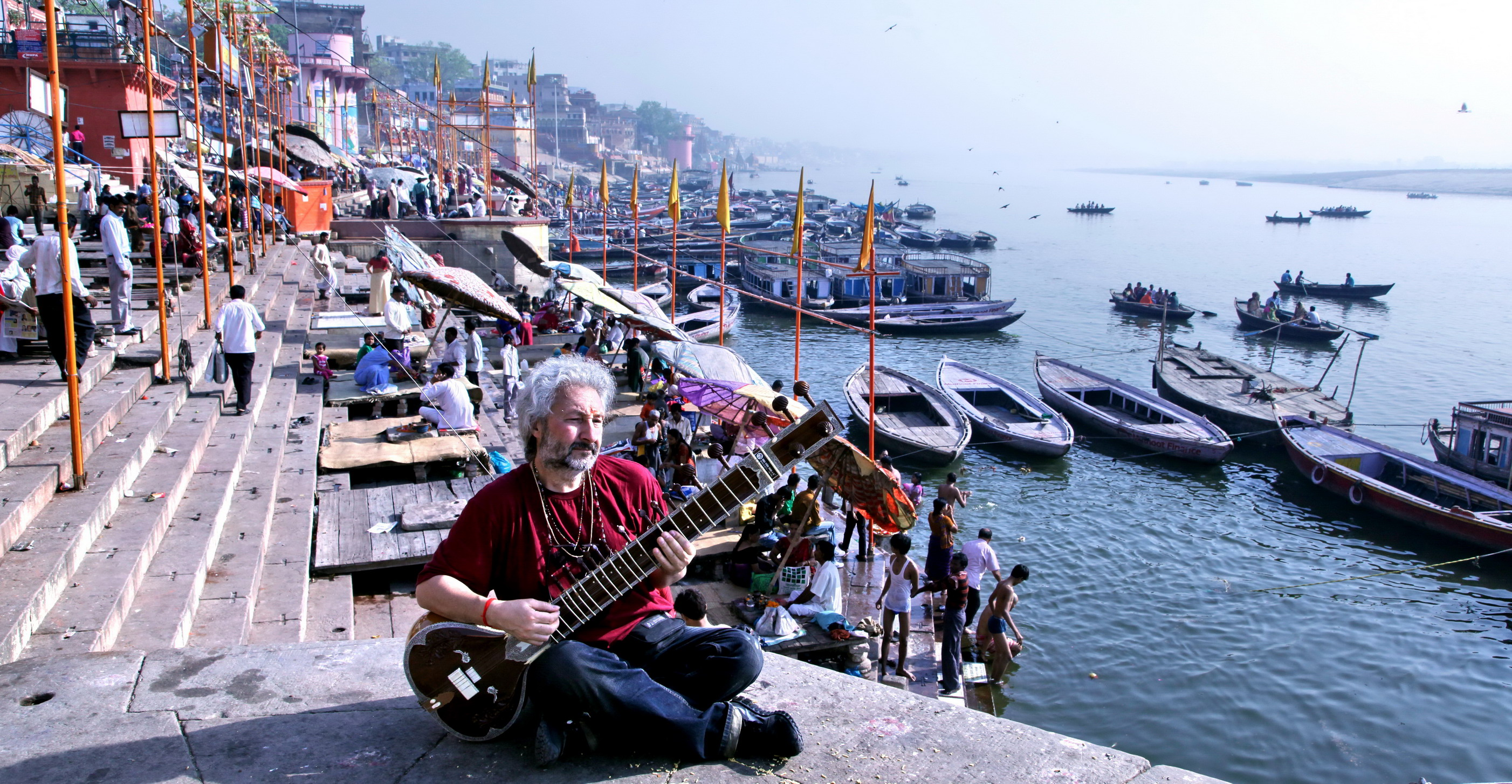
Stas Namin. India, Varanasi. Meditation on the bank of the river Ganges, 2009

- 2000 In addition to his other projects, Namin becomes seriously involved in painting, drawing and photography, composing and performing symphonic and ethnic music, shooting documentary films and mounting new productions in his theater.
- 2001 Namin's band the Flowers celebrate their 30th birthday with a big concert in Moscow together with Russian superstars including Leonid Agutin, Tatiana Antsiferova, Alexander Gradsky, Mikhail Chernov (DDT), Sergei Mazaev (Moral Code X), Valery Meladze, Nikolai Noskov, Lyudmila Senchina, Yuri Shevchuk and Andrey Makarevich (Mashina Vremeni).
- 2002 The Flowers record an album of rock versions of old Russian folk songs.

In September the SNC Orchestra under the baton of Ohan Durian performs a memorial concert in the Great Hall of the Moscow Conservatory for victims of terrorism (the programme includes Ravel’s Bolero and Berlioz’ Symphonie Fantastique). The US Ambassador to Russia gives an introductory speech at the concert.

- 2003 Namin holds the Russian International Film Festival (RIFF) in Hollywood, and Leonardo DiCaprio becomes the first recipient of its Tower Award "for outstanding contributions to world cinematography". More than forty feature, animated and documentary films from the Soviet era are screened at the festival, which is covered by major American media outlets.
- 2004 Namin's international Russian film festival is expanded, becoming the Russian Nights festival of Russian culture. It's held at the Pacific Design Center in Los Angeles in April and major venues in Manhattan in October. Over the course of three years Namin organizes a series of Russian Nights festivals in the US, Germany, China, South Korea and other countries. Recipients of the festival's Tower Award include writers Ray Bradbury and Gore Vidal; artist Peter Max; directors Oliver Stone, Francis Ford Coppola and William Friedkin; producers Peter Hoffman and Roger Corman; and actors Shirley MacLaine, Sharon Stone, Nastassja Kinski, Dustin Hoffman, Leonardo DiCaprio, Harrison Ford, Ben Kingsley and others.

In Los Angeles Namin introduces poet Andrei Voznesensky to Sharon Stone, to whom Voznesensky dedicates a poem.
The Stas Namin Centre participates in organizing the cultural programme for the Spirit of Fire film festival in Khanty-Mansiysk, Russia.
Namin holds the Russian International Film Festival in Frankfurt, Germany, screening more than twenty feature and documentary films.
Namin organizes a cultural programme at the Frankfurt Book Fair, during which dozens of Russian alternative, ethnic and jazz musicians perform on several stages in the city.

- 2005 The third Russian Nights festival is held in Los Angeles. The festival includes a series of lectures on Russian culture given by well-known Russian cinematographers, artists and writers.

The Stas Namin Centre holds the American Autumn festival of American culture and IndieVid festival of American independent film in Moscow.
The SNC holds a Russian culture festival at the Hannover Messe international trade fair in Germany.
The SNC’s Moscow Symphony Orchestra under the baton of Ohan Durian performs a memorial concert at the Moscow International House of Music for victims of terrorism (the programme includes Mozart’s Requiem).

- 2006 The Stas Namin Theatre presents the Russian version of the musical Hair in Hollywood, CA.

The fourth Russian Nights festival of Russian culture is held in Los Angeles. The Year of Russian Culture in China and Russian Nights festival of Russian culture are held in Seoul, Korea.

- 2007 The Stas Namin Centre holds the inter-governmental festival Year of Russian Culture in China in Russia. It also helps organize a second festival of American cinema in Moscow and a festival of Korean culture in Russia.
- 2008 Namin's The Beatles and India festival draws 30,000 spectators to the SNC's open-air space in Moscow's Gorky Park.

The SNC holds the Year of Russian Culture in Bulgaria.
The SNC participates in Russian Independence Day celebrations in Berlin and Paris.
The Stas Namin Theatre takes part in the 40th-anniversary celebrations of Hair’s Broadway debut in New York; a film about the legendary musical names the SNC troupe’s version one of the five best in the world.

- 2009 In honor of the Flowers’ 40th anniversary, Namin records the double album Back to the USSR at «Abbey Road» Studios in London. The album includes the band's legendary hits created from 1969 to 1982.
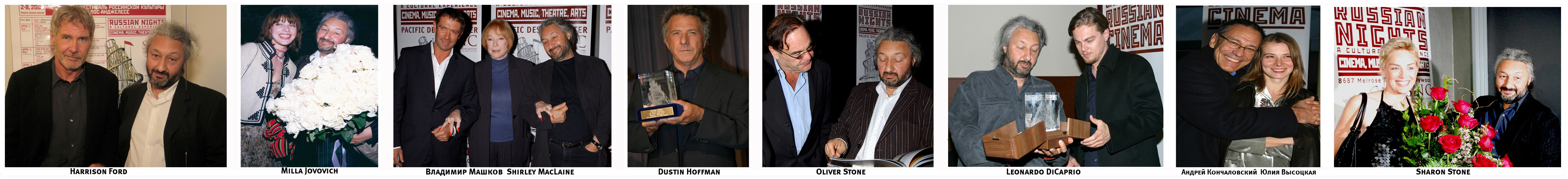
Guests of festival Russian Nights. Los Angeles, Hollywood, 2003-2006

=== 2010s ===
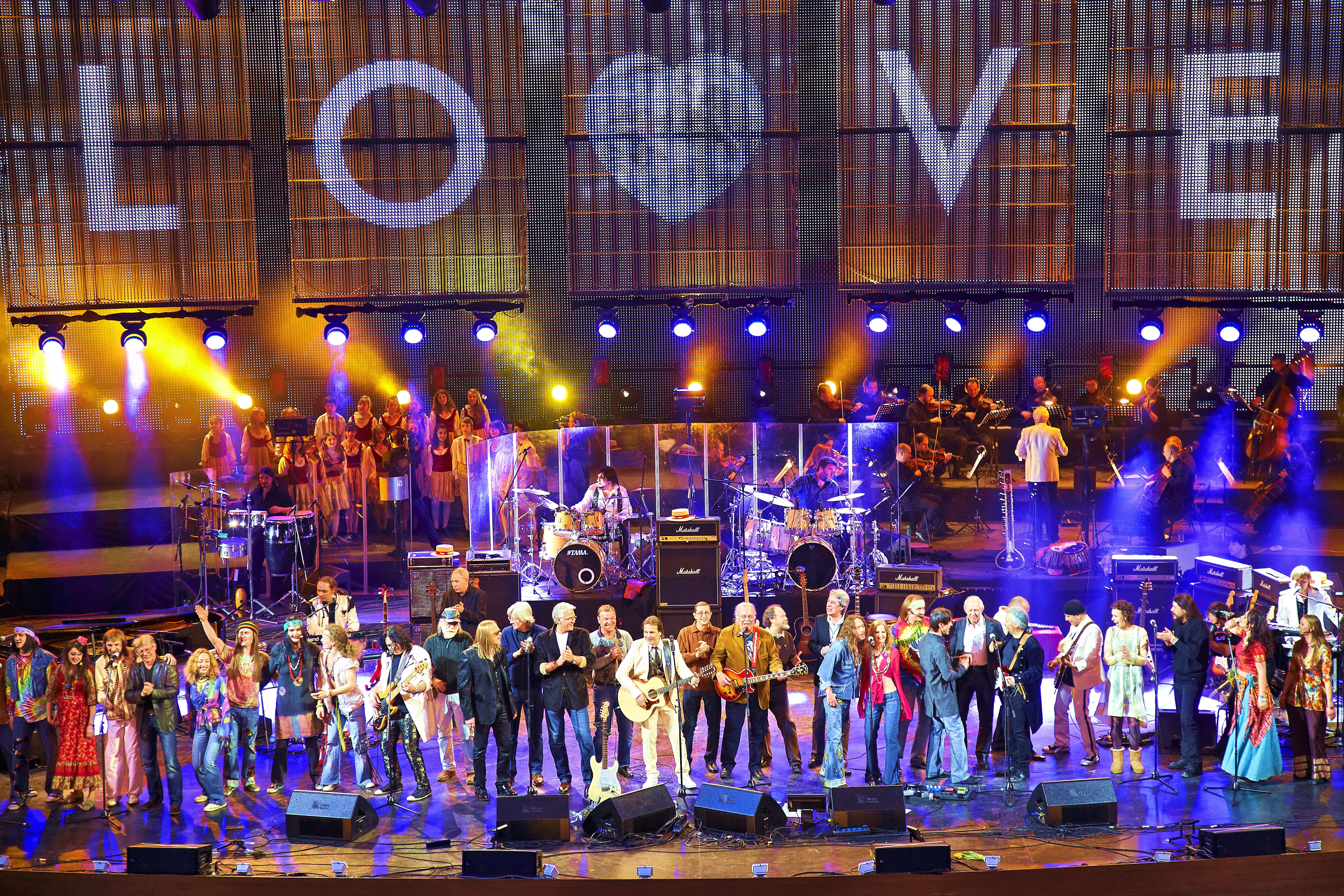
The Flowers. 40th anniversary. Concert in Moscow, 2010

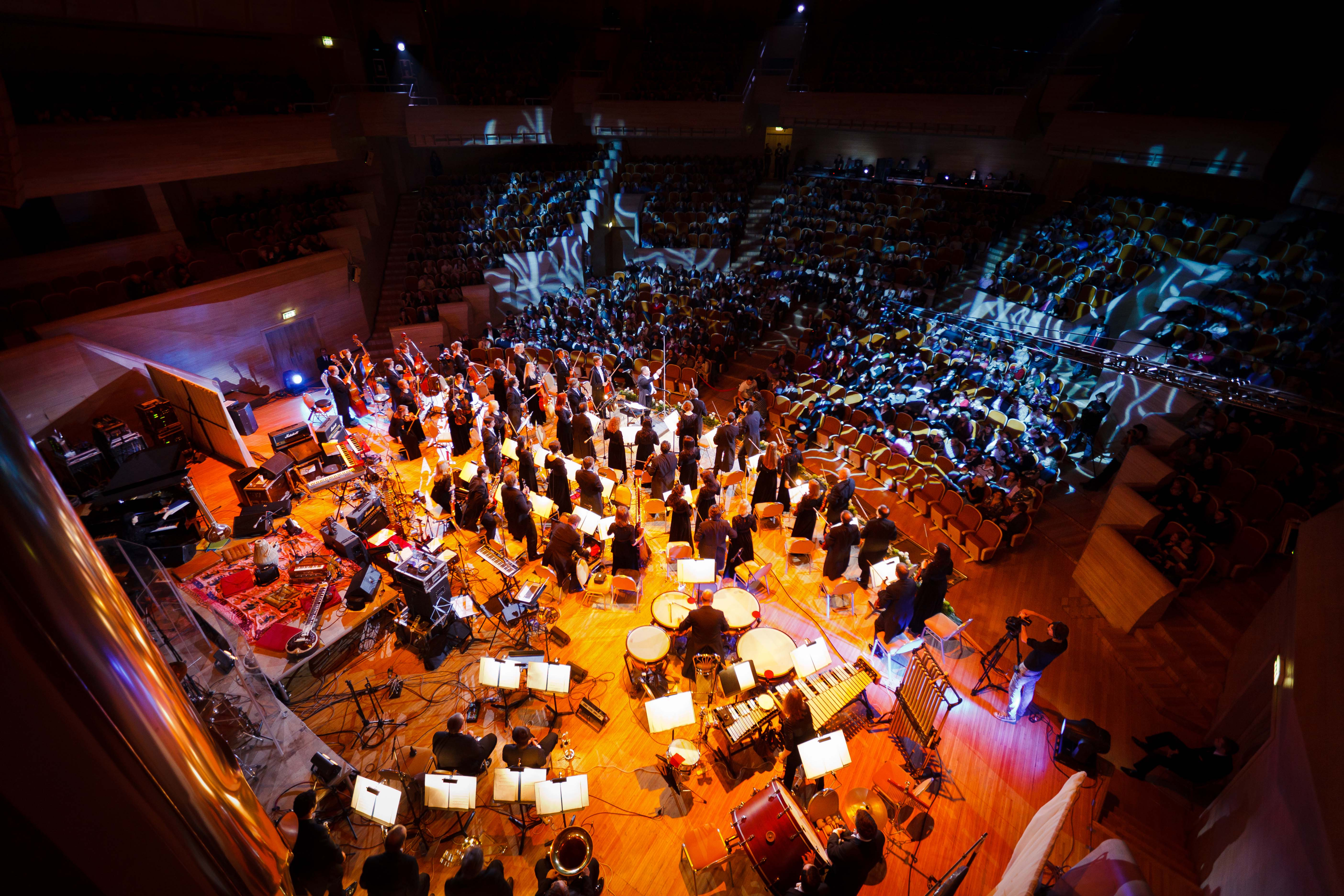
Concert at the Moscow House of Music. Namin's suite "Autumn in St. Petersburg". 2011

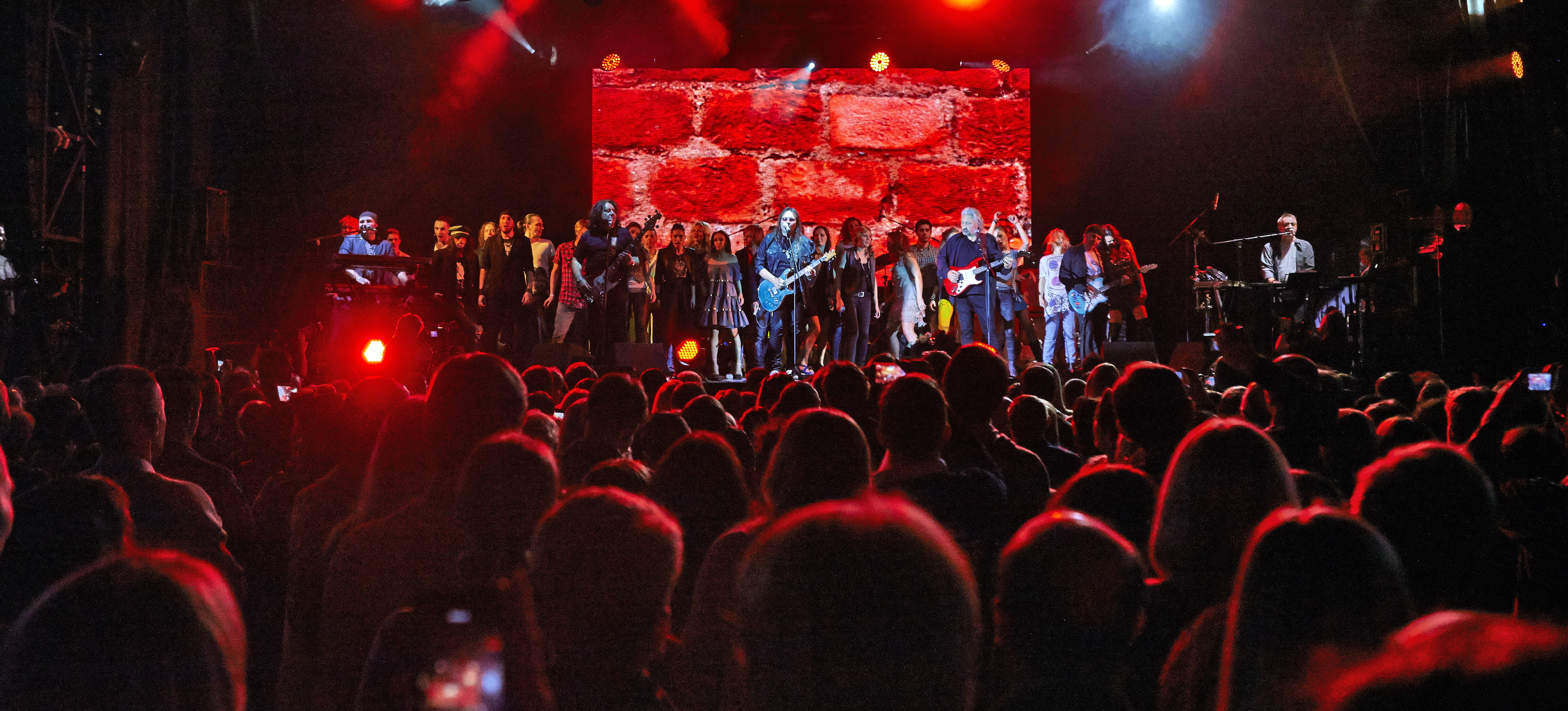
The Flowers. "Another Brick in the Wall". Arena Moscow, 2014

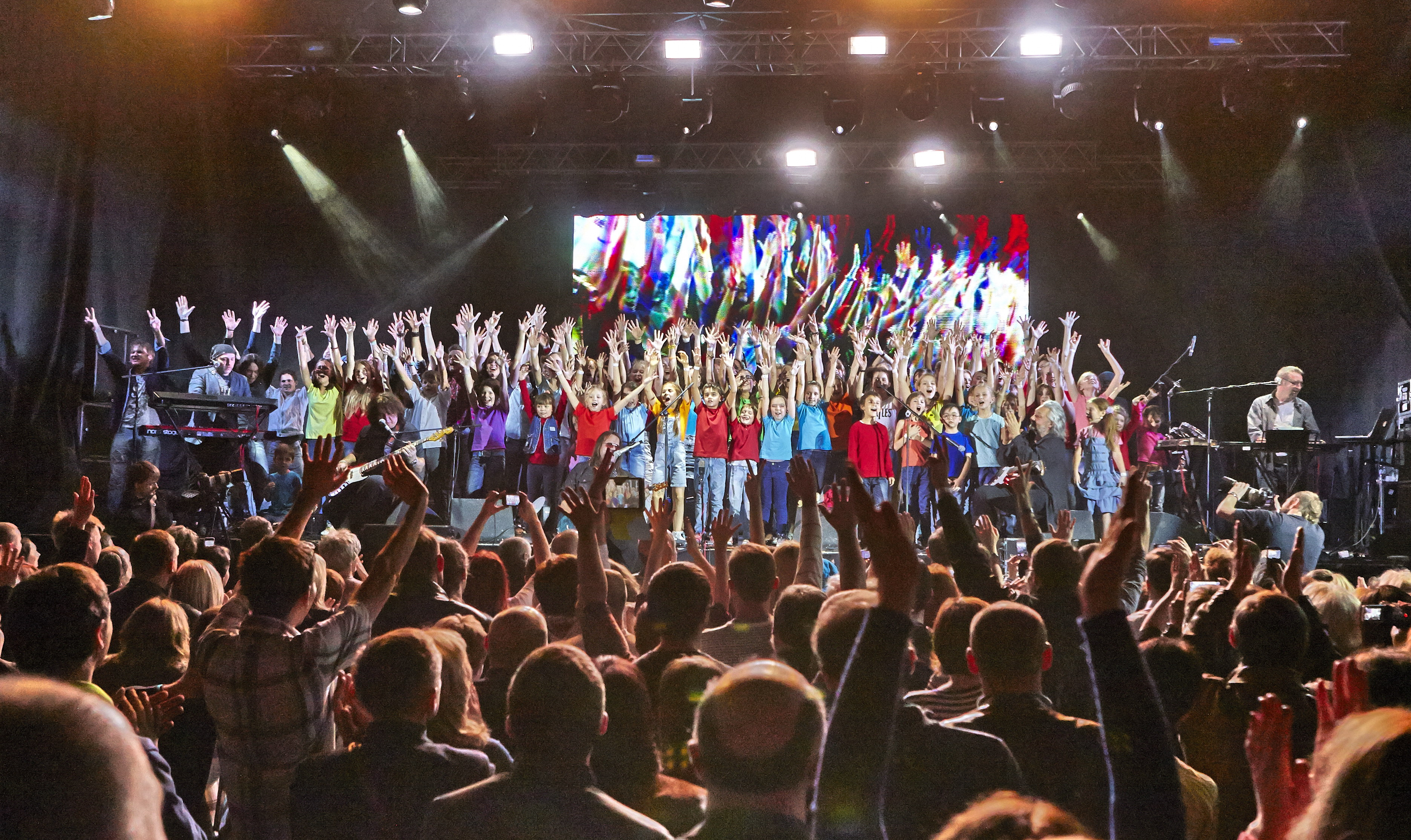
The Flowers. "Give peace a chance". Arena Moscow, 2014

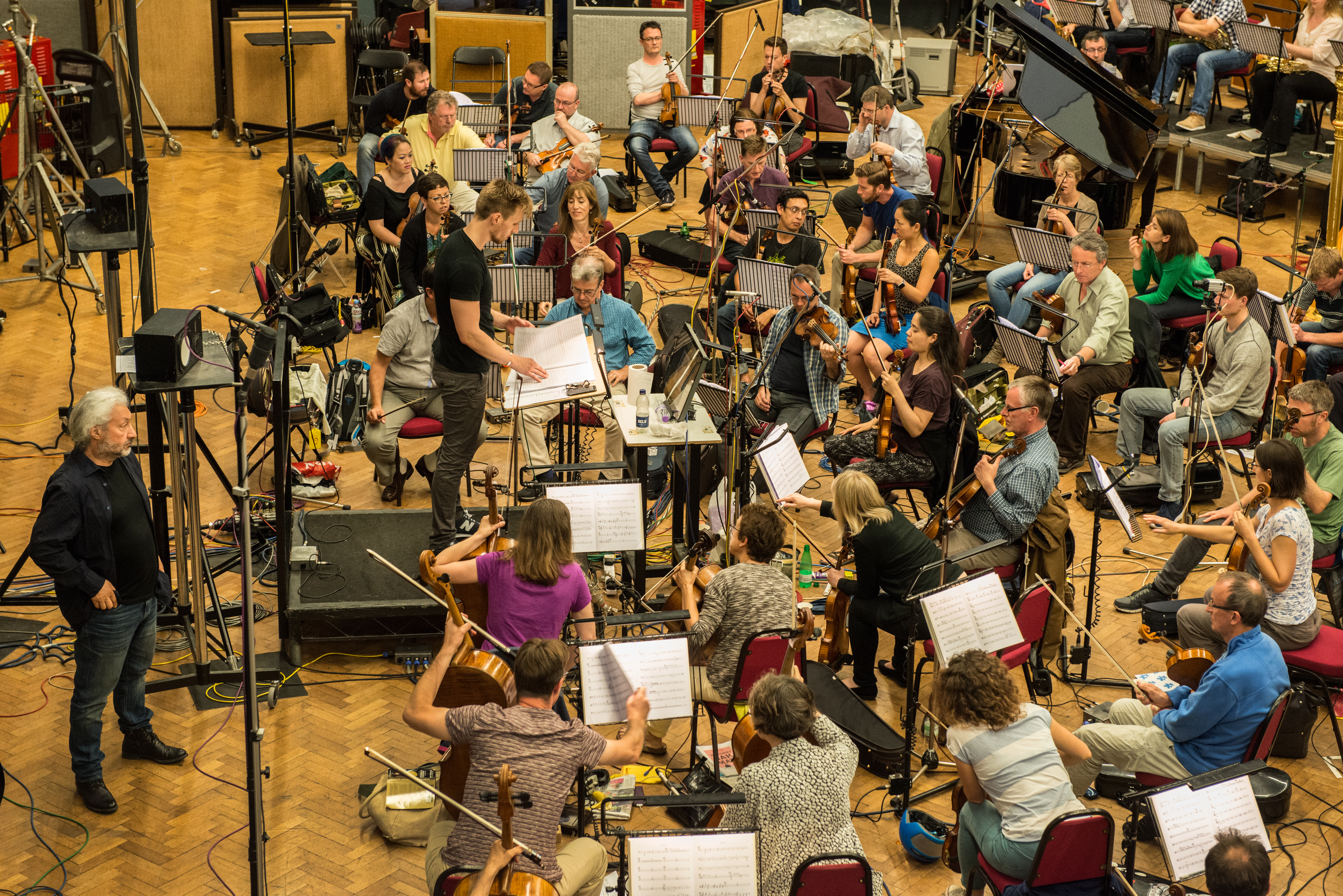
London Symphony Orchestra. Recording of Namin's symphony "Centuria S-Quark" at the Abbey Road studio. 2016

- 2010 Namin and the Flowers record the album Open the Window to Freedom at Abbey Road Studios in London. The album includes the band's forbidden songs from the 1980s as well as the Russian folk song "The Sun Rises and Sets" dedicated to the imprisoned Platon Lebedev and Mikhail Khodorkovsky. Open the Window to Freedom is named best album of 2010 by Peter Gabriel's organization Society of Sound.

The band marks its 40th birthday with a big concert in Moscow’s 6,000-seat Crocus City Hall, where it performs all its greatest hits as well as premiering its new composition "Light and Joy" and remake of the hit "Wind of Change". The latter is dedicated to Mikhail Gorbachev, who’s present in the audience.
Namin becomes a professor at the Sholokhov Moscow State University for Humanities. The Russian Academy of Theatre Arts (GITIS) offers him the post of professor and artistic director of musical theater courses.

- 2011 Namin's composition "Light and Joy" is performed at a special plenary meeting of the UNESCO General Conference in Paris honoring the 10th anniversary of the Declaration on Cultural Diversity.

"Light and Joy" graphically embodies One World idea that Namin has promoted since the early 1990s. Together with rock and pop stars and ethnic musicians, prayers are sung and chanted in the composition by adepts of the world’s five major religions—Hinduism, Buddhism, Judaism, Christianity and Islam. "Light, joy and love" unites everyone in this hymn of unity among the earth’s diverse peoples.
Namin’s symphonic suite Autumn in Petersburg is performed and recorded in the Moscow International House of Music. There the composer also performs his new sitar work Fusion Raga dedicated to George Harrison, accompanied by Indian and other musicians and a symphony orchestra.

- 2012 In March Namin makes a trip to the Beatles’ places of pilgrimage in northern India, visits ancient Buddhist and Hindu temples and monasteries, meditates in the Himalayas and gives a sitar concert in the temple of Krishna-Balaram in Vrindavan.

Returning to Moscow, Namin records the triple album Meditation on the sitar with special guests from various countries of the world including Jivan Gasparyan and Krishna Preva.
In August the Legends of Russian Rock festival dedicated to the SNC’s 25th anniversary is held at the Stas Namin Centre in Gorky Park with the participation of Russia’s greatest rock stars.
Namin and the Flowers, together with performers from his theater and special guests, perform a remake of Pink Floyd’s Another Brick in the Wall in support of political prisoners, democracy and freedom in Russia. The song’s author Roger Waters rates the performance highly, and the remake becomes part of the film Free to Rock.

- 2013 To mark the 100th anniversary of Malevich's Black Square, the Stas Namin Theatre and State Russian Museum mount a reconstruction of Kazimir Malevich, Mikhail Matyushin and Alexei Kruchenykh's avant-garde opera Victory Over the Sun.

The Stas Namin Theatre launches premieres of Namin’s new musicals The Little Prince, The Snow Queen and Underground.
In New York, Namin works as co-author and co-producer on the film Free to Rock together with producer Nick Binkley and four-time Emmy award-winning director and producer Jim Brown. At a concert of his old friend Peter Yarrow (Peter, Paul and Mary) Namin meets an idol of his youth, legendary songwriter and singer Pete Seeger.

- 2014 Namin and the Flowers give a concert in the Moscow Arena featuring political songs devoted to the Russo-Ukrainian war, drawing 5,000 spectators. There Namin's new song "Feast in a Time of Plague" and John Lennon's «Give Peace a Chance» are performed in English, Russian and Ukrainian. After hearing this performance, Yoko Ono remarks that John Lennon would have gladly taken part in the concert.

After his graduation from New York University (NYU) and internship in Tribeca, Namin’s son Artyom Mikoyan collaborates with his father to shoot a film about well-known sculptor Ernst Neizvestny.
Over dinner at the Tribeca Bar in New York, Robert De Niro introduces Namin to Sean Penn. They discuss life and politics.
By decision of its presidium, the Russian Academy of Fine Arts elects Namin its honorary member.

- 2015 The film Free to Rock premieres in the Capitol and Georgetown University in Washington, DC (director: Jim Brown, co-producer and co-author: Stas Namin).

In June the Stas Namin Theatre presents the opera Victory Over the Sun at the world’s leading contemporary art expo Art Basel in Switzerland. In September the opera’s performed at the Moscow Biennale of Contemporary Art, in October, at the Louis Vuitton Foundation in Paris and in November, at the 16th Havana Theater Festival in Cuba.
On 1 October the exhibition Porcelain Dreams opens in Moscow presenting an exclusive porcelain series produced by the Imperial Porcelain Factory in St. Petersburg. It includes pieces designed by Stas Namin and his son Artyom along with a Suprematist tea service hand-painted by Namin based on sketches by Kazimir Malevich.
In December the premiere of New York. The 80s. Us takes place at the Stas Namin Theatre. Created in collaboration with Mihail Chemiakin, the stage production is devoted to a merry and tragic time of Russian emigration, to a surprising group of dancers, writers, artists and actors exiled from the USSR, among them Rudolf Nureyev, Mikhail Baryshnikov, Ernst Neizvestny and Eduard Limonov.
The Gusev Crystal Factory produces the composition The Four Monkeys based on an original design by Namin. It’s inspired by a well-known symbol of enlightenment and opposition to evil: three monkeys with their eyes, ears and mouth covered, respectively. By adding a fourth monkey absorbed in meditation to the composition, Namin rethinks and expands the symbol’s meaning.

- 2016 Namin and the Flowers begin recording a double album of their best songs with the participation of world-class rock stars Kenny Aronoff (drums), Marco Mendoza (bass guitar and vocals) and others. The album's release is planned for the Flowers’ 50th anniversary.

In June Free to Rock is screened at the Rock and Roll Hall of Fame Museum in Cleveland, OH.
The London Symphony Orchestra records Namin’s symphony Centuria S – Quark at Abbey Road Studios in London.
The State Russian Museum publishes Namin’s album of photographs The Magic of Venus, the result of fifteen years of photographic research into the phenomenon of childbirth.
A series of documentary films created by Namin, including Conversation with Neizvestny, sculptor Ernst Neizvestny’s last interview before his death, is screened at the Documentary Film Center in Moscow.
In November the Yaroslavl Academic Governor’s Symphony Orchestra performs Namin’s new symphony Centuria S – Quark at the Pushkin State Museum of Fine Arts to a limited audience of friends.
In December the symphony is performed in Aram Khachaturian Concert Hall in Yerevan by the State Symphony Orchestra of Armenia conducted by Sergey Smbatyan.
The world premiere of the Stas Namin Theatre production of My Heart’s in the Highlands, based on the play by William Saroyan, takes place in Armenia.
Namin’s films Ohan Durian, The Ancient Churches of Armenia and others are screened in Yerevan.

- 2017 Namin and film director Jim Brown travel throughout Cuba while shooting the Russian-American documentary The Real Cuba.

Namin holds a solo exhibition of paintings and drawings at the Artists’ Union of Armenia, showing eighty works in all. Namin is made an honorary member of the Artists’ Union of Armenia.
On 22 April the SNC holds a memorial concert in the Great Hall of the Moscow Conservatory dedicated to victims of the Armenian genocide. Mikhail Pletnev leads the Russian National Orchestra in a performance of Aram Khachaturian’s Symphony No. 3 and the conductor’s own version of Namin’s symphony Centuria S – Quark, the work’s first public performance in Russia.
On 23 April the world premiere of Namin’s film The Ancient Churches of Armenia featuring Catholicos of all Armenians Karekin II takes place in the Armenian Diocesan Church in Moscow.
On 24 April the Russian premiere of the Stas Namin Theatre production of My Heart’s in the Highlands, based on the play by William Saroyan, takes place in the Armenian Diocesan Church in Moscow.
On 28 April the Flowers perform in the legendary Grammy Museum in Los Angeles.

== Career ==
=== Music ===
He is one of the founders of Russian rock music, the creator and leader of the band the Flowers, which has sold more than 60 million records on the territory of the USSR and Eastern Bloc countries over its half-century of existence, and the author of many popular songs including "Summer Evening", "Nostalgia for the Present" and "We Wish You Happiness!" Namin organized the country's first independent production company (SNC), from which many Russian stars emerged, among them the rock band Gorky Park, which Namin created. He organised in 1988 the first standing concert in Moscow with the Scottish band BIG COUNTRY. He organised the country's first pop and rock festivals, including the 1989 Moscow Music Peace Festival at Luzhniki Stadium with world-class headliners, the One World and Rock from the Kremlin festivals and others; the founder of the country's first private enterprises (record labels, radio stations, TV networks, concert agencies, design studios and others), which broke the state monopoly and gave rise to the modern Russian show business; and the founder of Russia's first non-governmental symphony orchestra, the country's first Western-style musical theatre and other groups.

With his group The Flowers he recorded and released two audio albums at Abbey Road Studios, Back to the USSR and Open the Window to Freedom, as well as three concert DVDs — The Flowers are 40, Homo Sapiens and Flower Power. Among Namin's new songs are the compositions "Light and Joy", an anthem for the unity of mankind, the song "Window to Freedom", performed together with Russian rock stars as a message for our time, "Feast in a Time of Plague", about the war in Ukraine, and world-acclaimed remakes of "Another Brick in the Wall" and "Give Peace a Chance".

As a symphony composer Namin has released a concert version of his well-known suite Autumn in Petersburg. In 2016 a piano version was also created and recorded in Germany. In 2016 he also wrote and recorded his new symphony Centuria S – Quark with the London Symphony Orchestra. In 2017 People's Artist of Russia Mikhail Pletnev led the Russian National Orchestra in his own version of Namin's symphony in the Great Hall of the Moscow Conservatory.

In ethnic music, Namin recorded his double album One World Music Freedom together with guest artists from India, Armenia, Israel, Palestine, Great Britain, Africa and other lands.

He performed sitar music in Vrindavan, India, and recorded the triple album Meditation and the composition Fusion raga dedicated to George Harrison.

=== Theatre ===
Namin is both stage director and producer at the theatre he created, the Stas Namin Music and Drama Theatre (Russian: Театр музыки и драмы Стаса Намина, romanized: Teatr muzyki i dramy Stasa Namina, also known simply as Stas Namin Theatre), in 1999-2000, whose first productions were the legendary American musical Hair and the rock opera Jesus Christ Superstar, both of which remain part of the theatre's repertoire.

His reconstruction of the 1913 avant-garde opera Victory Over the Sun, played in 2015 at three major international venues: the leading contemporary art expo Art Basel; the Moscow Biennale of Contemporary Art; and the annual FIAC art fair in Paris, receiving high praise from critics and art historians.

=== Film ===
Namin has created a series of documentary films, including an interview with Ernst Neizvestny, Magical India, The Ancient Churches of Armenia, with the participation of Catholicos Karekin II, and the Russian-American joint productions The Real Cuba and Free to Rock. Namin was co-author and co-produced of the latter film, which was shown at the United States Capitol in Washington, DC, the Rock and Roll Hall of Fame Museum in Seattle and the Grammy Museum in Los Angeles. The film's world television premiere took place on the American PBS network.

=== Photography ===
The State Russian Museum published his first album of photographs in 2001 a 15-year photo project The Magic of Venus devoted to the phenomenon of childbirth.

=== Art ===
Namin has been painting and drawing professionally for many years, exhibiting his works in various museums and galleries in Russia. He created the portrait series Inside Out and a series of works devoted to Italy, Armenia and Jerusalem. In 2014 Namin became an honorary member of the Russian Academy of Fine Arts.

== Recognition ==
In 2016, the Academy presented his solo exhibition Inside Out in honour of his 65th birthday.

== Interviews ==
Press

- Novaya gazeta. "Massy lyubyzt tolko teh, kto ih primitivno razvlekaet". №45, 26.06.2003
- Novaya gazeta. "Deti Tsvetov". №29, 20.04.2006
- Vechernyaya Moskva. S.Namin S NAMI, i zhizn prodolzhaetsya
- Sergey Shapran - Stil zhizni ot Stasa Namina
- BBC. "Stas Namin: Uchit angliyskiy mne meshali devushki", 28.12.2009
- Rossiyskaya gazeta. Tsvety ne vyanut. 24.02.2010
- Nezavisimaya gazeta. "Igry samovizhivaniya", 26.02.2010
- Ogonek. "Ya nikogda ne byl nashim", 01.03.2010
- Noyev Kovcheg. "Stariy kaif, noviy draiv". March, 2010
- Novaya gazeta. "Rock - prerogativa elity". №22, 03.03.2010
- Itogi №10 / 717 (08.03.10)
- Novaya gazeta. "My zhivem v pokolenii Sharikovykh", №128 от 12.11.2012
- Cultobzor. Zhivopis - eto prelomlenie realnosti cherez sobstvennoe videnie", 07.11.2016
- Gazeta.ru. "Starayus derzhatsya podalshe ot politiki", 08.11.2016
- Novaya gazeta. "Tsenzura deneg moshchneye, chem lyubaya ideologiya", №126 от 11.11.2016
- Kommersant. "Pochemu by ne poprobovat' delat' to, chto khochetsya?", 11.11.2016
- russia-armenia.info. "Stas Namin: Dlya menya bol'shaya chest' pokazat' geneticheskoy rodine, chem ya zanimalsya vse eto vremya", 15.11.2016
- Zhizn kak tvorchestvo
- Billboard
- Egoist
- Turizm i otdykh
- Versiya
- Mir novostey
- Moskovskiy Komsomolets
- Argumenty i fakty
- Vouge
- Domovoy
- Stolitsa
- Trud
- Banki.ru
- Argumenty nedeli
- Moskovskiy Komsomolets
- Ekspress-gazeta online
- Kvadrat"
- Argumenty nedeli
- Watch russia
- gazeta « Kul'tura »
- gazeta «Metro»
- Vechernyaya Moskva
- Vechernyaya Moskva
- Moskva Tsentr

TV

- TV Rain. Lektsii na dozhde, 21.08.2011
- ОРТ. «Vecherniy Urgant», November 2012
- 1TV. V nashe vremya, 27.06.2014
- Den rozhdeniya radio «SNC» na radio «RaKurs» 95.01.04
- Kultura. Nablyudatel, 05.12.2016

Radio

- Mayak. Odin Vadim, 04.11.2016
- Echo Moskvy. Difiramb, 06.11.2016
- Orfey. Randevu s diletantom, 22.04.2017
