= Tsvety =

The Flowers
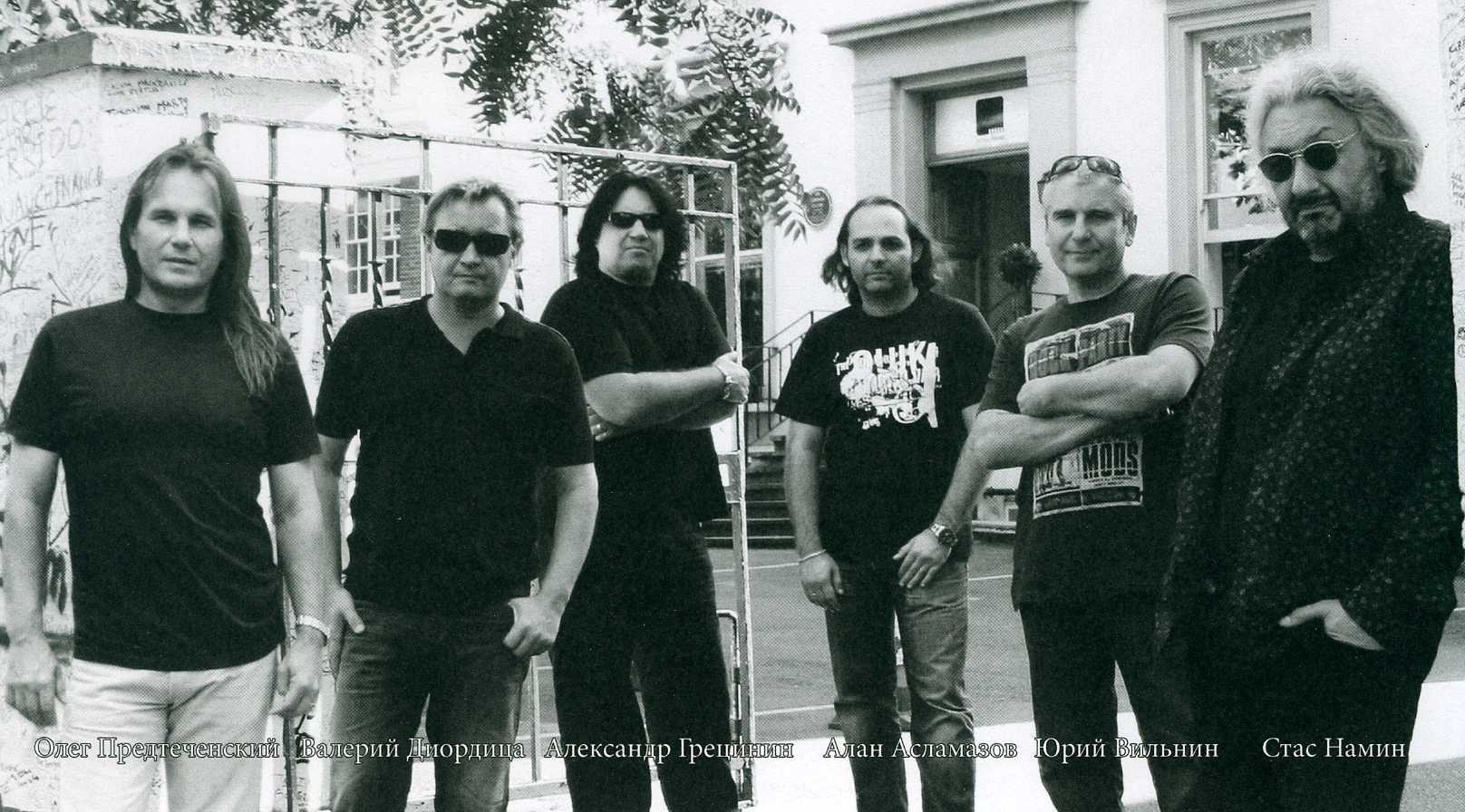
- Stas Namin & The Flowers (2009)

Background information
- Origin: Moscow, Russian SFSR, Soviet Union
- Genres: rock, progressive rock, blues, ethno rock, rhythm-n-blues, pop-rock
- Years active: 1969–present
- Members: Oleg Predtechensky; Valery Diorditsa; Alexander Gretsinin; Yury Vilnin; Alan Aslamazov; Andrey Shatunovsky; Stas Namin
- Past members: Alexander Losev (1949-2004)
- Website: flowersrock.ru

Tsvety (Russian: Цветы, lit. 'The Flowers') is a Soviet and Russian rock band that, according to Itogi magazine, "started all Russian alternative culture". It was one of the first bands to introduce rock music to the Soviet show business.

Established in 1969 by the frontman Stas Namin, releasing flexi discs throughout 1973 with the label Melodiya and sold over seven million copies. Their song "Happiness" was a hit in the USSR for 3 years in the 1980s.

After their successful tour in the USSR in 1974 the band dissolved in 1975 with a conflict with the Philharmonic Society, and with the banning of the band by the government. As a result, they changed the band's name to The Stas Namin Group in 1976, before changing back to its original name at the Perestroika period.

== History ==
=== Foundation (1969—2009) ===
Stas Namin established Tsvety in 1969.

In 1973 The Flowers released flexis with producing company Melodiya overall seven million copies were sold, becoming a major hit in the USSR and went on its first professional tour.

The band dissolved in 1975, as a result of a conflict with the Philharmonic Society, and it was liquidated by a decree of the Ministry of Culture of the USSR, its name was banned. But in 1977 the band revived under the new name The Stas Namin Group. In 1978 the band went on tour while still being banned by all central mass media outlets.

In 1980, during the years of the Olympic Thaw, the band managed to release a solo album "Hymn to the Sun", and participate in a TV show, after that they were banned once again. The period of bans and persecution that lasted to the Perestroika period when the life of the band got much easier. They returned the name Tsvety and went on tour, performed abroad in the Western countries and completed a world tour in four years. In 1990 the band ceased its activities and, as a matter of fact, did not exist for the next almost ten years.

By the end of 1980s the Soviet monopolist record label Melodiya sold over sixty million copies of Tsvety records, but neither Stas Namin, nor the band members were paid out of this record sales. Namin wrote most of Tsvety songs. Many of them were banned, but those which were released became national hits. Their song "Happiness" was a hit in the USSR for 3 years in the 1980s, and even now it remains one of the most beloved songs for Russia and former Soviet Union.

Over fifty famous musicians started their careers with Tsvety. Gorky Park was also formed by Tsvety members, including Stas Namin in 1987.

Tsvety reunited in 1999 and celebrated their 30th anniversary with a big concert in Moscow, but did not return to show business. They participated in the productions of Hair, the Russian version of Jesus Christ Superstar, and other projects at The Stas Namin Music and Drama Theater. In 2009, the band celebrated again its 40th anniversary with a grand show with special guest-stars, and actively started the new creative life.

=== The modern period (2009—present) ===
Tsvety recorded two albums "The Best of Flowers" at the Abbey Road Studios, covering all of their songs from the 1970s and releasing their songs that are prohibited in 1980s.

On 6 March 2010 The Flowers celebrated their 40th anniversary in Moscow at Crocus City Hall. The Flowers anniversary show featured various ex-members of the band including Yury Fokin, Konstantin Nikolskiy, Vladimir Chugreyev, Alexander Slizunov, Vladimir Semyonov, Vladislav Petrovskiy, etc., friends of the band (Andrey Makarevich, Yury Shevchuk, Garik Sukachov, Nikolai Noskov, Alexander Marshal, Dmitry Revyakin, Julia Chicherina, Evgeniy Khavtan, Lyudmila Gurchenko, Oscar Feltsman, etc.), and even the choir representing the Children's Variety Theater, the chamber ensemble Moscow Soloists conducted by Yuri Bashmet, the soloist ensemble representing the Stas Namin Theater, representatives of different religious denominations and ethnic musicians from all over the world.

Thirty years after releasing the first (and actually the last) art album titled Hymn to the Sun (1980) the band recorded their new album Open Wide Your Window at the Abbey Road Studio in London. The record contained fifteen previously unreleased (due to strict censorship) songs but written mostly in 1980 with lyrics by 1960s poets as well as two new songs by Namin – Hymn to Today's Heroes and Window to Freedom.

In 2013 they released two albums with new songs including – Homo Sapiens and Flower Power. In autumn 2014 Tsvety planned their 45th anniversary tour that included 45 cities in Russia, and in 2015 – a world tour. That was the farewell tour of the legendary rock-band.
