= Bang (Gorky Park song) =

1989 single by Gorky Park

Single by Gorky Park

from the album Gorky Park
- Released: 1989
- Length: 4:47
- Label: Vertigo; Mercury
- Songwriter(s): Alexey Belov; Michael Berardi; Nikolai Noskov; Gregory Schwartz
- Producer(s): Mitch Goldfarb; Gorky Park

Gorky Park singles chronology
"Bang" (1989)	"Peace in Our Time" (1989)

"Bang" is a song by Soviet rock band Gorky Park, released in 1989 as the lead single from the band's self-titled debut album. The song reached number 41 on the US Billboard Album Rock Tracks, while in Europe, it charted in Norway, where it spent six weeks within the VG-lista top 10, peaking at number five for four weeks. The music video for "Bang" received heavy rotation on the American MTV, where it stayed two months in MTV's top 15, peaking at number three.

== Track listings ==
7-inch single (made in Netherlands)
No.	Title	Length
1.	"Bang"	4:47
2.	"Action"	3:55

== Charts ==
Chart (1989)	Peak position
Norway (VG-lista)	5
US Album Rock Tracks (Billboard)	41
