= Aleksandr Marshal =

Russian musician (born 1957)

Alexander Marshal Александр Маршал
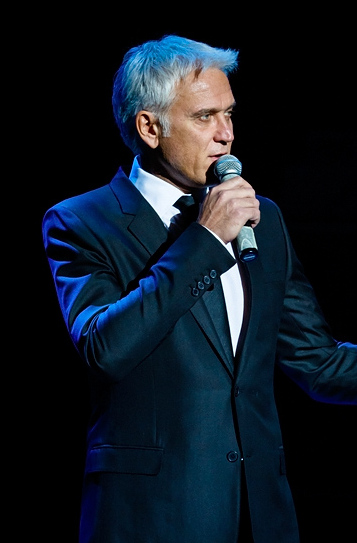

Background information
- Born: Aleksandr Vitalyevich Minkov (Александр Витальевич Миньков); 7 June 1957 (age 69); Korenovsk, Krasnodar Kray, USSR
- Genres: Rock; hard rock; Russian chanson; glam metal
- Occupations: Singer; songwriter; musician
- Instruments: Bass guitar; fortepiano; guitar
- Years active: 1983–present
- Labels: Мистерия Рекордс; Союз-продакшн
- Website: a-marshal.ru

Aleksandr Vitalyevich Minkov (Russian: Александр Витальевич Миньков; born 7 June 1957), better known by his stage name Alexander Marshal (Russian: Александр Маршал), is a Russian singer, songwriter, and musician; Honored Artist of the Russian Federation (2007).

Minkov was born in Korenovsk, USSR He is known for his solo career, and as well as past participation in several bands: Araks, Tsvety, Zdravstvuy, pesnya, and Gorky Park. Marshal was awarded Golden Gramophone Award in 2001 and 2003, and is also a laureate of Russian musical awards like Chanson of the Year and Pesnya goda.

His stage name, "Marshal", is in fact his nickname since school years, because, being very tall, he always stood first in ranks during roll call, both in sports and in military school.

== Discography ==
Albums

- 1995 — From Shore to Shore
- 1998 — Maybe
- 2000 — Where I Was Not
- 2000 — Highlander
- 2001 — Special
- 2001 — White Ash
- 2002 — Best Songs
- 2002 — Batya
- 2003 — Father Arseny
- 2005 — Cranes are Flying
- 2006 — Or So
- 2006 — Life on Loan (Live)
- 2007 — Sailboat
- 2008 — Where the Sun Sleeps with Vyacheslav Bykov
- 2009 — Goodbye, Regiment
- 2012 — Before Sunrise the Night Stars with Vyacheslav Bykov
- 2012 — Wrap
- 2016 — Shadow
