= Passive Control =

Studio album by Yonderboi
- Released: 23 September 2011 (Germany)
- Recorded: 2011
- Genre: electronic
- Length: 42:28
- Label: Mole Listening Pearls
- Producer: Yonderboi

Yonderboi chronology
Splendid Isolation (2005)	Passive Control (2011)

Professional ratings
Review scores
Source	Rating
Allmusic	
Recorder Blog	(9/10)
EST	(9/10)
Magyar Narancs	

Passive Control is the third studio album recorded by Yonderboi. The album was released on 23 September 2011. After six years of hiatus, Yonderboi returned with a full-length studio album. The title is self-contradictory like the previous ones (Shallow and Profound and Splendid Isolation).

== Track listing ==
All lyrics are written by Yonderboi

No.	Title	Music	Producer(s)	Length
1.	"Sustainable Development"	Yonderboi	Yonderboi	2:42
2.	"I Am CGI"	Yonderboi	Yonderboi	3:39
3.	"She Complains"	Yonderboi	Yonderboi	3:40
4.	"Roast Pigeon"	Yonderboi	Yonderboi	4:30
5.	"Paint Hunting On The Wall"	Yonderboi	Yonderboi	4:15
6.	"Brighter Than Anything"	Yonderboi	Yonderboi	4:08
7.	"Mono De Oro"	Yonderboi	Yonderboi	4:47
8.	"Synchronicity"	Yonderboi	Yonderboi	4:11
9.	"Inexhaustible Well"	Yonderboi	Yonderboi	4:46
10.	"Come On Progeny"	Yonderboi	Yonderboi	4:04
11.	"After The Snap"	Yonderboi	Yonderboi	1:46

== Contributors ==
- Edward Ka-Spel - vocals (track 1)
- Doma Schrank - guitars (track 1, 2, 4, 7)
- Charlotte Brandi - vocals (track 3, 5, 6, 8, 10)
- Albert Markos - cello (track 11)
