= Bez nazvaniya =

Studio album by Nikolai Noskov
- Released: 9 November 2012
- Genre: Progressive rock Art rock
- Length: 26:51
- Language: Russian
- Label: HOFA
- Producer: Horst Schnebel

Nikolai Noskov chronology
| It is not Worth it (2011) | Bez nazvaniya (2012) | The Best (2016) |

Bez nazvaniya (Russian: Без названия; transl. Untitled) is the sixth studio album of Russian rock musician Nikolai Noskov, released in 2012. There are 6 tracks on the disc. The licensed version of the album was sold only at his concerts.

== Album information and production ==
Originally, Nikolai wanted to record the album in the UK, but because of the visa regime associated with the events at the Olympics, he decided to find a studio in another country, Nicholas recorded the album in the studio of the famous platinum producer Horst Schnebel, who worked with stars such as Bad Boys Blue and Xavier Naidoo.

The track Honey is a nostalgic song about his trip to Jamaica and traveling by train across Russia, two participants of the De-Phazz group took part in the recording. The song Confessions was re-recorded for the album. The song Night (David Tukhmanov - Vladimir Mayakovsky), which was banned in Soviet times, returned to the repertoire of the artist, and was recorded by him for the first time. The songs I was alone and Lakes were written on the poems of Nikolay Gumilyov.

== Track listing ==
All music written by Nikolai Noskov unless otherwise stated.

| No. | Title | Lyrics | Transliteration (Translation) | Length |
|---|---|---|---|---|
| 1. | "Без названия" | | Bez nazvaniya (Untitled) | 4:09 |
| 2. | "Озёра" | Nikolay Gumilyov | Ozyora' (Lakes) | 5:09 |
| 3. | "Ночь" | Vladimir Mayakovsky | Noch (Night) | 4:41 |
| 4. | "Я был один" | Nikolay Gumilyov | Ya byl odin (I was Alone) | 4:06 |
| 5. | "Исповедь" | D. Korotaev | Ispoved (Confession) | 4:24 |
| 6. | "Мёд" | | Myod (Honey) | 4:16 |
| Total length: | | | | 26:51 |
