= Powerless (TV series) =

American sitcom developed by Ben Queen

- Genre: Sitcom; Action; Superhero
- Based on: Characters by: DC Comics
- Developed by: Ben Queen
- Starring: Vanessa Hudgens; Danny Pudi; Christina Kirk; Ron Funches; Alan Tudyk
- Composers: Jefferson Friedman; Craig Wedren
- Country of origin: United States
- Original language: English
- No. of seasons: 1
- No. of episodes: 12

Production
- Executive producers: Justin Halpern; Patrick Schumacker; Dean Lorey; Marc Buckland; Len Goldstein
- Producer: Douglas S. Orestein
- Production locations: Vancouver, British Columbia, Los Angeles, California
- Camera setup: Single-camera
- Running time: 23 minutes
- Production companies: Ehsugadee Productions; DC Entertainment; Warner Bros. Television

Original release
- Network: NBC
- Release: February 2 – April 20, 2017
- Network: TVNZ OnDemand
- Release: May 12 – May 19, 2017

Powerless is an American sitcom television series developed by Ben Queen, that aired on NBC from February 2, to April 20, 2017. The series is a sitcom set within the world of the DC Universe. The pilot, which was greenlit in August 2015, was ordered to series on May 11, 2016. On April 25, 2017, NBC pulled the final three episodes of the series from its schedule, with no indication whether they would be rescheduled at a later date. The series was officially cancelled on May 11. The unaired episodes were made available on TVNZ OnDemand later that same day.

== Premise ==
Powerless takes place in the DC Universe and follows the adventures of Emily Locke (Vanessa Hudgens) as Director of Research & Development at Wayne Security, a subsidiary of Wayne Enterprises based in Charm City, that specializes in products to help ordinary humans avoid becoming collateral damage in the battles between superheroes and supervillains.

The storylines in the television series are not directly based on storylines in the DC comic franchise, including the Batman franchise. Instead, the premise imagines stories that run parallel to the plots in the comic franchise.

== Cast and characters ==
- Vanessa Hudgens as Emily Locke: The director of Research & Development for Wayne Security, a subsidiary of Wayne Enterprises that specializes in products that make defenseless bystanders in a world of superheroes and supervillains feel a little safer. She loves her job because she gets to help people.
- Danny Pudi as Teddy Knight: Though he reports to Emily, he spends his days creating time-wasting pranks as a way to make their office, that he calls "the least super place on earth", just a little less "un-super".
- Christina Kirk as Jackie Swift: Van's personal assistant and a speedster.
- Ron Funches as a fictionalised version of himself: He works with Teddy. In the episode "Sinking Day", it is revealed that he is from Atlantis, although others believed he was from Atlanta. He also hides the fact that he serves Atlantis' King Arthur Curry a.k.a. Aquaman.
- Alan Tudyk as Vanderveer "Van" Wayne: The boss of Wayne Security who is the son of Vanderveer Wayne Sr. and the cousin of Bruce Wayne. He aspires to work in the Gotham office with Bruce. The character was created by Batman's original writer Bill Finger with artist Sheldon Moldoff, and made his first appearance in Batman vol. 1, #148 (June 1962).
- Jennie Pierson as Wendy Harris: She works with Teddy and Ron.

Atlin Mitchell had been cast in a recurring role as Crimson Fox, but was later replaced by Deanna Russo. Adam West, who portrayed Bruce Wayne / Batman in the 1960s television series Batman and its theatrical feature film, narrated the pilot episode, introducing Wayne Security. He also portrayed Chairman West in the 11th episode, "Win, Luthor, Draw". Marc McClure, who portrayed Jimmy Olsen in the 1978–87 initial Superman film series, portrayed Emily Locke's father in the pilot.

== Production ==
In January 2016, NBC gave the pilot order for Powerless. The main cast was revealed in the following month: Vanessa Hudgens as the main character, Emily Locke, Danny Pudi as Teddy, Alan Tudyk as Van and Christina Kirk as Jackie. Ron Funches joined the cast as Ron. The initial pilot episode also featured Kate Micucci and Josh Fadem as Wendy Harris and Marvin White, respectively, but they were dropped from the final series, with Jennie Pierson replacing Micucci as Wendy Harris. Ben Queen was originally attached as showrunner before he left in July the same year. On April 25, 2017, NBC pulled the final three episodes of the series from its schedule, with no indication of if they would be rescheduled at a later date.

Segue shots of Charm City feature a western view of the Cleveland skyline with fictional buildings, including the skyscraper headquarters of Wayne Security, occupying the foreground.

The episode "Emergency Punch-Up" was mistakenly aired instead of "Van v Emily: Dawn of Justice" in Canada, several regions of the US and on the NBC website. The running order was changed because of the prominence of a chemical gas attack in the episode which similarly occurred in Syria just before the episode was aired. "Win, Luthor, Draw" was subsequently released on DC Comics' YouTube channel on June 16, 2017, a week after West's death.

== Episodes ==
No.	Title	Directed by	Written by	Original release date	Prod. code	US viewers (millions)
1	"Wayne or Lose"	Marc Buckland	Justin Halpern & Patrick Schumacker	February 2, 2017	T12.15402	3.10
Emily Locke is hired as the new R&D director at Wayne Security in Charm City, but finds the staff unmotivated and her boss and the head of the division, Van Wayne, only looking to move up the corporate ladder at Wayne Enterprises. Van announces that his cousin Bruce Wayne is going to close the division if it cannot compete with rivals like LexCorp, but actually wants Wayne Security to fail so that he can leave Charm City in hopes of moving to Gotham City and thus makes no attempt to save it. Under Emily's leadership, the team develops a wrist-worn supervillain detector that alerts the wearer when one is nearby, saving the company. This forces Van to remain in Charm City out of his obligations towards his company and causes him to dislike Emily. The news reports that the vigilante Batman used the new device to locate his archenemy, the Joker, and help the Gotham City Police Department apprehend him.
2	"Wayne Dream Team"	Marc Buckland	Dean Lorey	February 9, 2017	T12.15403	2.53
Emily accidentally tells Van that their Rumbrella, an umbrella that can protect the user from falling rubble, will be done within a week, but the R&D team is more focused on FSL (Fantasy Superhero League), a hobby in which they do not allow her to take part. Meanwhile, Van is upset that only his shoulder is in the "Wayne Dream Team" poster. Emily tries to come across as both a friend and boss to the team while Van works on getting himself into the poster.
3	"Sinking Day"	Jay Chandrasekhar	Paul Mather	February 16, 2017	T12.15406	2.49
Van forgets to tell the team about an important feature their latest project needed to have, causing Van to lose Ace Chemicals, Wayne Security's oldest and largest client, as well as his father Vanderveer Wayne Sr.'s respect. In an effort to earn back his father's respect, Van and Emily work on getting the Atlanteans as their clients by throwing a Sinking Day party for them to celebrate the day Atlantis sunk into the ocean. Ron tries to convince Jackie and Teddy that Wayne Security's new accountant, Alex, is also Charm City's newest superhero, The Olympian.
4	"Emily Dates a Henchman"	Matt Sohn	Neel Shah	February 23, 2017	T12.15407	2.27
After she receives a wedding invite from her ex-boyfriend, Emily goes out to a bar with Jackie and Wendy who encourage her to find someone new. She meets a man who appears to measure up to her high standards, but what she does not realize is that her date is a henchman for the Riddler. Meanwhile, Teddy and Ron find a Batarang stuck to the door of a safe that Wayne Security is supposed to improve. After learning about the Batarang, Van, who blames Batman for causing $30,000 in damage to his side-view mirror, hatches a plan: he wants to lure Batman to Charm City using the Batarang and convince Batman to pick him as the next Robin so he can get him to pay back the money.
5	"Cold Season"	Clark Mathis	Amy Mass	March 9, 2017	T12.15405	2.38
While cold-themed villains rampage Charm City, Emily tries to convince Teddy to submit his heat-emitting gloves to an in-company competition for new inventions. Meanwhile, Van convinces Ron to assemble toys that'll help him win over his new girlfriend's daughter.
6	"I'ma Friend You"	Alex Reid	Sabrina Jalees	March 30, 2017	T12.15408	1.81
With Crimson Fox leaving Charm City, Emily decides to take self-defense classes and tries to get Jackie to join her, but in trying to help Jackie, Emily over-steps Jackie's boundaries. Meanwhile, Van is convinced that someone besides him used his personal work toilet and wants to fire the culprit. He tries to get Teddy, Ron, and Wendy to turn on each other.
7	"Van v Emily: Dawn of Justice"	Jaffar Mahmood	Greg Lisbe & Jared Miller	April 6, 2017	T12.15410	2.02
Emily challenges Van to an archery contest in order to win her own office. The others advise her to throw the contest, as they have survived in the office by stroking Van's ego, but Emily believes that Van needs to face reality. Meanwhile, after Teddy is saved by Green Fury, he becomes infatuated with her and tries to meet her again, despite having an upcoming date with another woman.
8	"Green Furious"	Michael McDonald	Dean Lorey	April 13, 2017	T12.15411	2.04
Emily earns a favor from Green Fury by saving her life and standing up for her to the media. Later, in an effort to get the Wayne Security Board of Directors to pay attention to her ideas, Emily convinces Green Fury to star in a commercial, claiming it will help the superhero be taken seriously by the media. But things don't go as planned when the Board of Directors wants to change the commercial to just the opposite of what Emily had storyboarded. Teddy, still smitten with Green Fury, tries to improve his image to get her to go out with him. Meanwhile, Jackie's daughter Ruby has been suspended from school for punching a boy and will not tell Jackie why she did it; Jackie becomes resentful of Wendy when Ruby befriends Wendy and opens up to her.
9	"Emergency Punch-Up"	Linda Mendoza	Lillian Yu	April 20, 2017	T12.15409	2.03
Everyone at Wayne Security is looking forward to a company island retreat, but on the day of the retreat, a gas attack by supervillain Doctor Psycho leaves Emily, Van, and the team trapped under lockdown in the office. They are forced to make the best of it while they wait for the all-clear.
10	"No Consequence Day"	Joe Nussbaum	Maggie Bandur	May 12, 2017 (TVNZ OD)	T12.15412	N/A
Lois Lane is killed; Ron tells the team about a theory that Superman will once again turn back time to save the woman he loves. Since their actions will now have no long-term consequences, Ron becomes a dog owner, Emily and Wendy run wild and get in trouble with the law, Jackie starts hitting the bottle, Teddy makes a move for power, and Van tells Bruce Wayne what he really thinks of him. Fully committed to the day being reset at some point, they are shocked when Superman appears with a new girlfriend at Lois' funeral.
11	"Van of the Year"	Michael Weaver	Maggie Bandur	May 19, 2017 (TVNZ OD)	T12.15404	N/A
Emily deals with Van stealing credit for her generosity at the office. Teddy pushes a reluctant Ron to get his new invention, a thought-controlled flying drone, to the public.
12	"Win, Luthor, Draw"	Rebecca Asher	Paul Mather	May 19, 2017 (TVNZ OD)	T12.15413	N/A
An alien attack damages the Gotham headquarters of Wayne Industries, so Chairman West arrives in Charm City to deliver bad news to Van & the team. Through her efforts to save the company, Emily's efficiency makes everyone a target. Jackie gets a shocking surprise that will change her life.

== Reception ==
=== Critical response ===
After the original pilot was shown at Comic Con 2016, reviews were generally positive. Eric Goldman of IGN gave it a 7.5/10, saying that "it's very endearing and amusing and has me looking forward to seeing where it can go". Sydney Bucksbaum of Nerdist praised the pilot episode, saying it's "the superhero comedy we deserve" and "fans of comic books, office comedy, rom-coms or just having a good laugh, Powerless is for you". After the pilot episode aired at SDCC 2016, series creator Ben Queen departed the series, after which it was given a new premise and almost the entire episode was rewritten and reshot without Queen or original director Michael Patrick Jann.

Reviews for the second pilot episode of Powerless were mixed. Review aggregation website Rotten Tomatoes reported a 64% critic approval rating with an average rating of 5.36/10 based on 33 reviews. The website's consensus reads: "Powerless has a strong premise leaving room for improvement -- and strong performances from a talented cast -- but the show's initial spark is dimmed by uneven execution and a lack of laughs". Metacritic, which uses a weighted average, assigned a score of 57 out of 100 based on 26 reviews, indicating "mixed or average reviews".

Jesse Schedeen of IGN gave the pilot episode a 4.2/10 saying "there's a lot of potential in that idea, but very little of it is realized here" calling the script "lousy" and calling the show "generic". Yahoo's Dominic Patten called Powerless "a charming comedy with legs and a smart premise". The opening credits, which were part of the original pilot and which use classic artists like Carmine Infantino, were praised by Yahoo's Ken Tucker, saying that "the credits aren't funny, they're just beautiful", while Sonia Saraiya praised the cast, particularly Vanessa Hudgens as Emily Locke calling her performance charming, and Tudyk's performance as "the standout". Additionally she said she is optimistic about the show, saying that "there's a light, nimble humor to the show's treatment of superpowers and heroic antics — a much needed respite".

After the first two episodes were panned by critics, the third and fourth episodes received favorable reviews. Jesse Schedeen of IGN gave "Sinking Day" a 7.2/10, saying that "the show improves enough in its third episode to leave hope that the show will eventually realize its full potential". About the fourth episode "Emily dates a Henchman", Jesse Schedeen gave it an 8/10 saying that "the show still isn't particularly deep, and it still struggles to take advantage of every member of the main cast, it is developing into an entertainingly goofy take on the DC Universe".

=== Ratings ===
Viewership and ratings per episode of Powerless
No.	Title	Air date	Rating/share (18–49)	Viewers (millions)
1	"Wayne or Lose"	February 2, 2017	1.1/4	3.10
2	"Wayne Dream Team"	February 9, 2017	0.8/3	2.52
3	"Sinking Day"	February 16, 2017	0.8/3	2.49
4	"Emily Dates a Henchman"	February 23, 2017	0.7/3	2.27
5	"Cold Season"	March 9, 2017	0.7/3	2.38
6	"I'ma Friend You"	March 30, 2017	0.5/2	1.81
7	"Van v Emily: Dawn of Justice"	April 6, 2017	0.6/2	2.02
8	"Green Furious"	April 13, 2017	0.6/2	2.04
9	"Emergency Punch-Up"	April 20, 2017	0.6/3	2.03
