= En passant (disambiguation) =

The en passant capture is a chess move.

En passant may also refer to:

- Coup en passant, a technique in the card game bridge
- En Passant (Alphawezen album), 2004
- En passant (Jean-Jacques Goldman album)
- En Passant (2000) fragrance by Frédéric Malle

== See also ==
- Passant (disambiguation)
