= Detunized Gravity =

Studio album by De-Phazz
- Released: 1997
- Genre: Electronica
- Label: Mole

De-Phazz chronology
Detunized Gravity (1997)	Godsdog (1999)

Detunized Gravity is the first album of De-Phazz, which was released in 1997.

== Track listing ==
No.	Title	Length
1.	"Roses"	7:03
2.	"Between 2 Thieves"	5:28
3.	"Homesick Inc."	4:04
4.	"Lovechild"	4:50
5.	"Cut the Jazz"	5:12
6.	"Little Company"	5:47
7.	"Nameless Life"	5:30
8.	"Good Boy"	6:11
9.	"Lullaby"	4:59
10.	"Hero Dead & Gone"	3:59
11.	"No Jive"	4:35
12.	"Detunized Gravity"	3:46
13.	"Free Drift"	6:19

Source: AllMusic
