= Splendid Isolation (album) =

Studio album by Yonderboi
- Released: 21 October 2005 (Germany)
- Recorded: 2005
- Genre: Electronic
- Length: 56:51
- Label: Mole Listening Pearls
- Producer: Yonderboi and Tom Holkenborg

Yonderboi chronology
| Shallow And Profound (2000) | Splendid Isolation (2005) | Passive Control (2011) |

Professional ratings
Review scores
| Source | Rating |
|---|---|
| Allmusic | |

Splendid Isolation is the second studio album recorded by Yonderboi.

== Track listing ==
All lyrics are written by Yonderboi

| No. | Title | Music | Length |
|---|---|---|---|
| 1. | "All We Go To Hell" | Yonderboi | 4:07 |
| 2. | "Amor" | Yonderboi | 3:39 |
| 3. | "Eyes for You" | Yonderboi | 4:46 |
| 4. | "Badly Broken Butterflies" | Yonderboi | 3:20 |
| 5. | "Follow Me Home" | Mark Knopfler | 4:40 |
| 6. | "Were you Thinking of Me?" | Imre Poniklo | 3:21 |
| 7. | "People Always Talk About the Weather" | Yonderboi | 4:58 |
| 8. | "Love Hides" | John Densmore, Robby Krieger, Ray Manzarek | 4:36 |
| 9. | "Motor" | Yonderboi | 4:30 |
| 10. | "Trains in the Night" | Yonderboi | 4:30 |
| 11. | "Soulbitch" | Yonderboi | 5:12 |
| 12. | "Before You Snap" | Yonderboi | 6:29 |
| 13. | "Even If you Are Victorious" | Yonderboi | 2:43 |

== Contributors ==
- Imre Németh Primary School Chamber Choir - led by Lilla Farkas (track 1)
- Albert Márkos - cello (track 1, 10, 12)
- Zsolt Ábrahám - guitar (track 2, 4, 5, 6, 7, 8, 11, 13
- Andor Kovács - guitar (track 3, 6, 7)
- Krisztián Szűcs - vocals (track 4, 7, 8)
- Scott Salinas - guitar (track 4)
- Gábor Subicz - trumpet (track 4), brass (track 7)
- Abbas Murad - trombone (track 4), brass (track 7)
- Edina Kutzora - vocals (track 5), backing vocals (track 7, 8)
- Imre Poniklo - vocals (track 6)
- Oszkár Ács - bass (track 6, 7)
- Synthia - vocals (track 11)
- Edward Ka-Spel - vocals (track 13)
- Olaf Heine - cover photo
