= Drive (2007 TV series) =

2007 American television series

- Genre: Drama; Action
- Created by: Tim Minear; Ben Queen
- Starring: Nathan Fillion; Kristin Lehman; Mircea Monroe; Riley Smith; Kevin Alejandro; J. D. Pardo; Dylan Baker; Emma Stone; Rochelle Aytes; Taryn Manning; Melanie Lynskey
- Opening theme: "Can't Stop the World" by Gavin Rossdale
- Composer: Keith Power
- Country of origin: United States
- Original language: English
- No. of seasons: 1
- No. of episodes: 6 (plus unaired pilot)

Production
- Executive producers: Tim Minear; Ben Queen; Greg Yaitanes
- Running time: 42 minutes
- Production companies: Reamworks; 20th Century Fox Television

Original release
- Network: Fox
- Release: April 13 – July 15, 2007

Drive is an American action drama television series created by Tim Minear and Ben Queen, produced by Minear, Queen, and Greg Yaitanes, and starring Nathan Fillion. Four episodes aired on the Fox Network in April 2007. Two unaired episodes were later released directly to digital distribution.

The series is set against the backdrop of an illegal cross-country automobile road race, focusing on the willing and unwilling competitors and, as the plot develops, the unseen puppet masters who sponsor the race. Minear has described the show's thematic tone by saying "a secret, illegal, underground road race can be anything from Cannonball Run to The Game to North by Northwest to Magnolia-on-wheels. Ours is all those things."

Drive was the first TV show in history to have a live Twitter session during an episode. The account @foxdrive still exists.

The show premiered on April 13, 2007, on CTV in Canada. It debuted in the United States on April 15, 2007 on Fox, and moved into its regular time slot on Mondays the next day; in that slot it faced stiff competition from NBC's Deal or No Deal and ABC's Dancing with the Stars. On April 25, Fox cancelled Drive after only four episodes had aired. The series has not yet been released to international markets (with the exception of Canada) or on DVD.

== Cast and characters ==
The cast of Drive

Actor	Role	Vehicle	Notes
Nathan Fillion	Alex Tully	1972 Ford F-100 (tan); 1972 Dodge Challenger (black)	Protagonist
Kristin Lehman	Corinna Wiles	1972 Ford F-100 (tan); 1972 Dodge Challenger (black)	Partners with Alex Tully
Kevin Alejandro	Winston Salazar	1964 Chevrolet Impala lowrider (gold)	Half-brothers
J.D. Pardo	Sean Salazar	1964 Chevrolet Impala lowrider (gold)	Half-brothers
Dylan Baker	John Trimble	1999 Ford Taurus (silver-blue)	Father and daughter duo
Emma Stone	Violet Trimble	1999 Ford Taurus (silver-blue)	Father and daughter duo
Michael Hyatt	Susan Chamblee	Land Rover LR3 (light blue); Ford Focus (red)	
Rochelle Aytes	Leigh Barnthouse	Pontiac Solstice (black)	Originally partners with Susan Chamblee and Ivy Chitty
Melanie Lynskey	Wendy Patrakas	Dodge Grand Caravan SXT (silver)	
Taryn Manning	Ivy Chitty		Originally partners with Susan Chamblee and Leigh Barnthouse, then partners with Wendy Patrakas, then steals the Trimbles' Ford Taurus
Riley Smith	Rob Laird	1979 Pontiac Trans Am (white)	Husband and wife team
Mircea Monroe	Ellie Laird	1979 Pontiac Trans Am (white)	Husband and wife team
Wayne Grace	Jimmy Cousins	Harley Davidson touring motorcycle (black)	Husband and wife team
K Callan	Ceal Cousins	Harley Davidson touring motorcycle (black)	Husband and wife team
Brian Bloom	Allan James	2007 Dodge Charger (black); 2002 Chevrolet Impala (red)	Not a race participant
Richard Brooks	Detective Ehrle		Not a race participant
Charles Martin Smith	Mr. Bright		One of the race organizers; not a race participant
Katie Finneran	Becca Freeman		Alex Tully's sister; not a race participant
Amy Acker	Kathryn Tully		Alex Tully's wife; not a race participant

== Route ==
The following are the checkpoints passed, clues or instructions before arrival, and the specifics regarding them.

Checkpoint	Clue/Instructions	Specifics
Key West, Florida	Text message: "Mainland Go" (announced the start of the race, not a destination)	The starting line of the race.
Jupiter, Florida	Text message: "Fly to Jupiter and find the red eye."	The Jupiter Inlet lighthouse.
Cape Canaveral, Florida	Text message: "Kennedy killed in '73." The message is accompanied by a countdown clock.	In 1973, Cape Kennedy was renamed to Cape Canaveral, thus "killing" the name "Kennedy." Drivers met at the Kennedy Space Center, where the countdown corresponded with a Space Shuttle launch.
Rome, Georgia	Each driver was given a red ticket stub with instructions to go to Rome, "After sunset, before dark." NOTE: in the ticket was written "ADMIT".	After Sunset drive-in movie theater.
Appomattox Court House, Virginia	Text message: "Surrender, America"	Appomattox Court House was where Confederate general Robert E. Lee surrendered to Union general Ulysses S. Grant, thus ending the Civil War.
Cleveland, Ohio	Most of the racers received two hot candies, while Alex, Corinna, Sean and Winston, who had taken advantage of their head start, received a note reading "Great Balls of Fire: The Rock 'n' Roll Hall of Fame - Cleveland"	The Rock 'n' Roll Hall of Fame.
Unknown	Alex Tully received the address to the next checkpoint on a slip of paper after arriving at The Rock 'n' Roll Hall of Fame.	The slip of paper is passed hand-to-hand, and the checkpoint is never revealed in the six produced episodes.

== Episodes ==
A total of six episodes of Drive were produced; four of them were aired prior to its cancellation. The series premiered on April 13, 2007 in Canada and on April 15, 2007 in the United States.

No.	Title	Directed by	Written by	Original release date	Prod. code	US viewers (millions)
0	Unaired Pilot	Greg Yaitanes	Tim Minear & Ben Queen	Unaired	1AMP79	TBD
1	"The Starting Line"	Greg Yaitanes	Tim Minear & Ben Queen	April 13, 2007 (CTV)	1AMP01	6.04
An illegal cross country race is being run. It seems that several racers are not competing of their own free will – Alex Tully is searching for his missing wife; a mother is somehow involved for her baby's safety—others may simply be after the 32 million dollar prize..
2	"Partners"	Greg Yaitanes	Tim Minear & Tom Szentgyörgyi	April 13, 2007 (CTV)	1AMP02	6.04
The race continues in Jupiter, Florida, where Tully, Wiles, and the other racers prepare for the next clue. Wendy Patrakas prepares to kill Ivy Chitty to stay in the race. Corinna's interest in the race is revealed.
3	"Let the Games Begin"	Marita Grabiak	Eoghan Mahony & Ben Queen	April 16, 2007 (Fox)	1AMP03	5.66
The next stage of the race begins. Alex meets an old acquaintance after getting in trouble with the police, while Wendy gets a new co-driver.
4	"No Turning Back"	Elodie Keene	Lauren Schmidt & Craig Silverstein	April 23, 2007 (Fox)	1AMP04	4.60
Alex and Corinna are offered a chance to move ahead of the other racers; Corinna is unsure of how safe the move would be. Susan and Leigh wish to stay in the race even after a bitter betrayal, but they are ultimately eliminated. Wendy fears for her baby's safety.
5	"The Extra Mile"	Paul Edwards	Salvatore J. Stabile & Juan Carlos Coto	July 15, 2007 (Online)	1AMP05	N/A
Alex, Corinna and the Salazar brothers are faced with the ramifications of their jump-start; Leigh gets a new partner; and Ivy puts Sam in danger.
6	"Rear View"	Michael Katleman	Kristen Reidel & Scott M. Gimple	July 15, 2007 (Online)	1AMP06	N/A
Alex risks everything to find Kathryn; Violet picks up a hitchhiking Ivy; Wendy hurries to save Sam from her husband; and the military finally catches up with Rob.

== Production notes ==
Fox greenlit series production on Drive in October 2006. In addition to the series pilot, another twelve episodes were ordered as a midseason replacement for spring 2007.

=== Filming locations ===
Drive was shot in the Los Angeles area, using road footage and green-screen technology. According to Tim Minear, "because of technology, we can actually create a cross-country road race and shoot it all in Santa Clarita." This led to geographic inconsistencies in the series, including mountains and desert settings visible during highway scenes set near Gainesville, Florida, when there are no actual mountain ranges or deserts in that area.

Highway scenes were shot on Interstate 210 in Rialto, California on the finished but unopened portion between Alder Ave. and Linden Ave. The exit for Alder Ave can be seen as the exit in most of the freeway scenes. In the first episode, the Alder Ave. sign for the exit is clearly legible. Scenes at the "Kennedy Space Center" were filmed at the Ambassador Auditorium in Pasadena, California.

=== Music ===
- Gavin Rossdale – "Can't Stop the World"
- The Doors – "Roadhouse Blues (Crystal Method Remix)"
- Bloc Party – "Kreuzberg"
- Nine Pound Hammer – "Radar Love"
- X – "The Hungry Wolf"
- Lunatic Calm – "Leave You Far Behind"
- Ghost in the Machine – "King of My World"
- Yonderboi – "Soulbitch"
- The Rhones – "Quitter"
- Crystal Method – "Bad Ass"

=== Cancellation ===
The two-hour premiere of Drive in the United States, broadcast on April 15, 2007 at 8:00 pm, was watched by six million viewers. The program did not deliver the ratings Fox desired, and on April 25, 2007, the network announced that it had cancelled Drive. The final two remaining unaired episodes of Drive were made available for online streaming on Fox on Demand beginning Sunday, July 15, 2007, in addition to the previously aired episodes. All six episodes of the show had been made available for purchase and download from the iTunes Store and Amazon Video on Demand exclusively for United States residents, but have since been removed. As of October 2023, the series was available via Amazon Prime.

Fox initially announced that the final two episodes would air on July 4, 2007. The network rescheduled them for July 13 and later pulled them entirely. The two remaining episodes were posted online on July 15, 2007. Executive producers Tim Minear and Craig Silverstein subsequently gave an interview that described what might have happened if the series had continued.

To the question "Which single work of yours do you feel didn't get the attention it deserved?", Nathan Fillion said: "I would say I did a series called Drive that would've been a really good TV series if more than two episodes had aired. It was a lot of fun and it was very short lived. Sometimes I forget I was in it."

== Awards and nominations ==
Drive, while short-lived, is the first series to be nominated for an Emmy Award under the organization's new "broadband" eligibility guidelines. The show's title sequence had originally been submitted for consideration in the category of "Outstanding Visual Effects in a Drama Series". However, the series was initially ineligible because Emmy regulations required a minimum of six aired episodes, while Drive had only aired four prior to its cancellation. After the sequence was posted for streaming on the Internet, it became eligible under the new "Outstanding Visual Effects in a Television Miniseries, Movie, or Special" category.

== In popular culture ==
- In the September 2007 issue of Marvel Comics' Friendly Neighborhood Spider-Man, Peter Parker comments that "ever since Fox cancelled Drive, it's been one piece of bad luck after another."

== General and cited references ==
- Official website
- Shales, Tom (14 April 2007). "Fox's 'Drive': It Can't Get There From Here". The Washington Post, p. C1.
