= Godsdog =

Studio album by De-Phazz
- Released: 1999
- Genre: Electronica
- Label: Mole

De-Phazz chronology
Detunized Gravity (1997)	Godsdog (1999)	Death by Chocolate (2001)

Godsdog is the second studio album by electronic band De-Phazz. It was released in 1999. It was re-released on January 15, 2021, with 4 extra tracks.

== Track listing ==
No.	Title	Length
1.	"The Mambo Craze"	4:33
2.	"Cafe Coca"	4:45
3.	"Jazz Music"	3:36
4.	"Steps Ahead"	3:37
5.	"Zero Zero"	4:01
6.	"Happiness"	3:44
7.	"Squeeze the Trigger"	2:45
8.	"April Shower"	4:46
9.	"Godsdog"	3:17
10.	"Low Budget Hotel"	1:50
11.	"Time Slips"	4:08
12.	"Havana Moon"	3:09
13.	"Information"	4:09
14.	"Next Message!"	4:19
15.	"Radio Sol"	1:43
16.	"Anchorless"	5:17
17.	"Downtown Tazacorte"	02:29
18.	"Jazz Music (Strings)"	03:35
19.	"The Mambo Craze (Ext. Version)"	04:33
20.	"Plastic Love Memory (No. Nine)"	04:44
