= Lemongrass (disambiguation) =

Lemongrass is any plant in the genus Cymbopogon.

Lemongrass may also refer to:

- Lemongrass (music), a German music act and record label
- LemonGrass (band), a Mexican children's music group
