= En Passant (Alphawezen album) =

Studio album by Alphawezen
- Released: 2004
- Genre: Electronic
- Label: HoloPhon
- Producer: Ernst Wawra

En Passant is a 2004 album by the German electronic duo Alphawezen, which was formed in 1998, consisting of Asu Yalcindag (vocals, lyrics) and Ernst Wawra (music). It has also been released for mp3 download by both HoloPhon and Mole Listening Pearls.

A video for "Speed of Light" was released in 2005 depicting Asu Yalcindag walking around with an iPod.

== Track listing ==
1. Chance Destination (4:47)
2. Speed of Light (4:08)
3. Rain (6:32)
4. In the Beginning (1:26)
5. Welcome To Machinarchy (4:12)
6. I Like You (3:40)
7. Sommerzeit (5:14)
8. En Passant (5:27)
9. White Noise (3:53)
10. Prothetique De Cerveau (3:51)
11. Wald2 (9:22)
12. Speed of Light (Godart String Version) (2:46)
