= Alphawezen =

German electronic music duo

- Origin: Germany
- Genres: Electronic, Downtempo
- Years active: 1998-2023
- Labels: Mole Listening Pearls, HoloPhon
- Website: alphawezen.com

Alphawezen is a German electronic duo formed in 1998, consisting of Asu Yalcindag (vocals, lyrics) and Ernst Wawra (music).

In the beginning, Alphawezen was an instrumental project, but with the first official album L'après-midi d'un Microphone (2001, Mole Listening Pearls) and with the co-operation of singer Asu it became a kind of ambient electronic pop music. Their style can also be considered as downtempo.

In Anne Fontaines Film Nathalie... with Emmanuelle Béart and Gérard Depardieu (2003), the Alphawezen song "Gai Soleil" is used in a club scene. In October 2007, the third Alphawezen album Comme Vous Voulez was released at Mole Listening Pearls. In November 2009, the double CD Snow/Glow was released, including remixes by Nightmares on Wax and The Timewriter.

A single entitled "Smile" has been released in August 2011.

In August 2023, Asu and Ernst announced an album had been recorded for release in November 2023. 'Milk', first single of the new album, was released on 29 September 2023.

== Discography ==
=== Albums ===
- Source (2023 / 2x12" Vinyl Album)
- Comme Vous Voulez (re-titled Freeze in France) (2007 / CD Album)
- En Passant (2004 / CD Album)
- L'après-midi d'un Microphone (2001 / CD Album)

=== Singles/Maxis ===
- Milk (2023 / Single)
- My Funny Valentine (2016 / Single)
- Smile (2011 / Single)
- Gun Song/ Days Remixes (2009 / 12" Vinyl)
- I Like You (2008 / download)
- Speed Of Light (2004 / download)
- Welcome To Machinarchy (2004 / 12" Vinyl Maxi)
- The Bruxelles EP (2004 / download)
- Into The Stars (2001 / 12" Vinyl Maxi)
- Gai Soleil (2000 / 12" Vinyl Maxi)

=== Compilations ===
- Snow/Glow (2009 / 2xCD)

== Videography ==
- 2023 Run
- 2023 Milk
- 2023 Freeze
- 2011 Smile
- 2008 Days
- 2005 Speed of Light
- 2002 Electricity Drive
- 2001 Into the Stars
- 2000 Frost
- 1999 Gai Soleil
