= A to Z (TV series) =

American romantic comedy television series

- Intertitle from pilot
- Genre: Sitcom; Romantic comedy
- Created by: Ben Queen
- Starring: Ben Feldman; Cristin Milioti; Katey Sagal; Lenora Crichlow; Henry Zebrowski; Christina Kirk; Parvesh Cheena; Hong Chau
- Narrated by: Katey Sagal
- Composer: Craig Wedren
- Country of origin: United States
- Original language: English
- No. of seasons: 1
- No. of episodes: 13

Production
- Executive producers: Ben Queen; Rashida Jones; Will McCormack; Bill Callahan; Michael Patrick Jann
- Producers: Jeff Grosvenor; Anna Dokoza
- Camera setup: Single-camera
- Running time: 22 minutes
- Production companies: BQ Productions; Le Train Train; Warner Bros. Television

Original release
- Network: NBC
- Release: October 2, 2014 – January 22, 2015

A to Z is an American romantic comedy television series created by Ben Queen. He served as an executive producer with Rashida Jones and Will McCormack for Warner Bros. Television. The series debuted on October 2, 2014, on NBC. Viewership fell by nearly 50% by the fifth episode, which aired October 30, and NBC canceled the series the next day, though choosing to air the final eight episodes, which had already been produced. The series finale aired on January 22, 2015.

== Premise ==
The story follows the lives of Andrew, an employee at an internet dating site who dreams of meeting the girl of his dreams, and Zelda, a no-nonsense lawyer who was raised by a hippie mother and carries a rebellious streak. By an accidental chance of fate, Zelda meets Andrew to resolve a mismatch dating dispute and these two single people suddenly find themselves falling for each other. From there, the series chronicles their relationship timeline "from A to Z", as narrated by Katey Sagal.

== Cast ==
=== Main ===
- Ben Feldman as Andrew Lofland
- Cristin Milioti as Zelda Vasco
- Henry Zebrowski as Stu Bartokowski
- Lenora Crichlow as Stephie Bennett
- Christina Kirk as "Big Bird" Lydia
- Hong Chau as Lora
- Parvesh Cheena as Dinesh
- Katey Sagal as the narrator

=== Recurring ===
- Patrick Carlyle as Sage
- Ben Falcone as Howard
- Nancy Friedrich as Nancy

== Broadcast ==
The series is available to stream in Australia on Stan. It broadcast on UK channel E4; it started on November 30, 2015. It began broadcasting on tv2 in New Zealand on December 6, 2015.

== Episodes ==
No.	Title	Directed by	Written by	Original release date	Prod. code	U.S. viewers (millions)
1	"A is for Acquaintances"	Michael Patrick Jann	Ben Queen	October 2, 2014	276073	4.79
Zelda enters Wallflower, an online dating service, to file a complaint. Her best friend, Stephie, set up her account and profile, which led to a horrible date. Andrew and his co-worker/roommate Stu greet her, and Stu starts feeding him pickup lines. Andrew escorts her to the proper department, and they discuss if they have already met. Later, she calls him at his desk, as her office is in the adjacent building visible from him. After each follow the other on various social sites, he asks her out for a drink. At the bar, a familiar tune plays, and he thinks she attended a concert where he admired her from afar and imagined life together with her. She insists it wasn't her and ends the date. Convinced it was her, he enlists the help of two programmers from work, Dinesh and Lora, to take her Wallflower profile and find online evidence of her at the concert that night. Meanwhile, Stephie tells her about her newest man, a jazz musician named Scatman Desmoines, and reminds her to open her heart to have luck finding love. Zelda apologizes to Andrew for overreacting, but overhears Lora and Dinesh tell Andrew about some online pictures proving she was at the club, only in a red dress, and only on a different night than he attended. Furious, Zelda calls him a stalker. Stephie and Stu arrive separately. Stu is "Scatman," a persona he adopted to successfully bed Stephie, for which Zelda busts him. Later, Andrew and Zelda are working late. She calls to invite him for a drink, but he declines, saying she should stay away. She finally admits to being at the concert in a silver dress on the first night. She confesses having trouble getting close to people, but is willing to try again. They meet outside, and she asks for another chance. He kisses her.
2	"B is for Big Glory"	Michael Patrick Jann	Ryan Koh	October 9, 2014	4X6802	3.63
After his promising date with Zelda lasts all night, Andrew returns to the office with a song in his heart and in his head. The song happens to be the theme music from This Week in Baseball, what he calls his "Big Glory" music, accompaniment to the finest moments of his life. Stu worries that Andrew might be in deep and cautions him about moving too fast. Andrew then realizes he has a pre-standing date with co-worker Brooke. He is torn but thinks canceling might set Brooke into an emotional tailspin. He also feels compelled to tell Zelda. She admires his honesty but lies about also having a date. Her jealousy forces her to commission Stephie to find out as much she can about Brooke and quickly arrange a date with Mike, a vapid but hunkish co-worker. Andrew suffers through his date with Brooke, while having Stu recon Zelda's date. He reports that they leave a restaurant early, and Andrew ends his own date to drive to Zelda's apartment. A shirtless Mike opens the door, and Andrew assumes the worst and drives off. The next day, he arranges to meet with her. She blurts out that Mike was only at her apartment because he needed something notarized. Andrew tells her nothing happened on his date either. He then reveals hearing majestic music in his head whenever he thinks of her. She merely and politely thanks him. Back in her office, she finds a package that Andrew dropped off for her. Inside, he has crafted a personalized bicycle license plate, spelling out her name by combining several other nameplates into one. Zelda has never found her own in her lifetime. She marches into Wallflower, telling him that she loves it and his confession about his "Big Glory" music. They each also insist to not wanting to see other people. She leaves, her own "Big Glory" playing in her head.
3	"C is for Curiouser and Curiouser"	Steve Pink	Bill Callahan	October 16, 2014	4X6803	3.37
Stephie demonstrates an app for rating ex-boyfriends, determined not to be surprised by her next suitor. Andrew reveals that Wallflower's research has determined that knowing too much about someone before beginning to date is actually harmful to the development of a healthy relationship. Zelda, hearing Stephie's point of view, does some online research about Andrew. Hours later, she finds dashboard camera footage of Andrew being arrested outside an Oakland Raiders game. Although outraged, she gives him a chance to mention it, but he fails to do so. She lashes out at him hiding his arrest. He explains that it was 10 years ago and the cops had it out for him. She still feels hurt and misled. Back at Wallflower, CEO Lydia begins snooping on her staff via their computer webcams. She is appalled to learn they call her "Big Bird". Howard explains that Big Bird is a high-ranking member of the Sesame Street hierarchy. She embraces the term as an honorific. Meanwhile, Dinesh and Lora leave Andrew a USB flash drive with Zelda's Wallflower profile and a few other secrets on it. Andrew cannot help but take a peek. Zelda later apologizes for invading his privacy and his trust. He confesses to perusing her profile, but found nothing. She blurts out that she was once married. She quickly explains about Gustav, a fellow law student whose student visa was expiring. She married him so he could stay and practice law. She assures Andrew that it was strictly platonic and she divorced Gustav the day he received his citizenship. She and Andrew agree to not keep secrets from one another. Her revelation has set off a jealous curiosity in him. He Googles Gustav, now a handsome successful Swedish lawyer. Andrew begins stalking him. He later sees Gustav is joined at his lunch by Zelda. Andrew sneaks to better hear and see them, not noticing that he's crouched down against a parked police car. Too focused and obsessed to listen to the suspicious officers, he quickly gets handcuffed, but not before he hears Gustav has invited Zelda to lunch to merely meet his new fiancé. Zelda notices a mortified Andrew as he gets arrested, yet rescues him, calling in a favor to get him released. Andrew is amazed she's being so understanding after he just stalked her. She later explains to him that, while growing up, her only role models were her parents, who were anything but a happily married couple, hence her reluctant attitude to 'marriage'. Still, she understands Andrew's belief in marriage is pretty strong, though she admits she's getting less cynical about it now. Which Andrew is delighted to hear, as he questions why that might be so, with a glint in his eye. She evades the question, kissing him instead.
4	"D is for Debbie"	Michael Patrick Jann	Laura Gutin Peterson	October 23, 2014	4X6804	3.13
After young Zelda's hippie parents divorced, her mother would disappear for weeks at a time, leaving Zelda with her mother's close friend Debbie, a nurturing earth mother, who loved her, sustained her and taught her how to cope. Debbie has recently died, and Zelda shares her sorrow with Andrew. Left undiscussed is the question of attending the funeral and memorial service. Andrew really wants to attend and wonders if she will invite him. Afraid to expose Andrew to her eccentric extended family, she chooses not to invite him to the service. Debbie and her friends were new age, earth-bound, and self-actualizing – everything Zelda is not, which might frighten Andrew. Zelda takes Stephie instead, avoiding the issue with Andrew. He still crashes the service, surprising Zelda. He thinks he has made a mistake, but her family immediately loves him, inviting him to a chant-based grieving ceremony. Zelda's Uncle Dave confesses to her and Andrew that he is grieving in his own way, by taking a bunch of magic mushrooms and is in no shape to deliver a eulogy. Zelda gets asked to do it. Immediately terrified, she begins to shut down. Andrew helps her with some remarks, and she gets through the speech. After the service, she admits to him about fearing his seeing her in an emotional, embarrassing state. She is actually grateful he came and saw her at her most emotionally wrought.
5	"E is for Ectoplasm"	Eric Appel	Theresa Mulligan	October 30, 2014	4X6805	2.49
Andrew and Zelda decide to celebrate their one-month anniversary by throwing a party on Halloween, upsetting Stu and Stephie, both of whom traditionally and separately enjoy the day with each. Andrew and Stu normally don their Ghostbusters jumpsuit costumes and jam to the theme song. Stephie and Zelda normally dress up as Laverne and Shirley, their two favorite sitcom characters, every year. Andrew and Zelda quickly call a summit: Stu and Stephie will throw a party on their behalf. Stu and Stephie cannot agree on any details, including whether to spend most of the budget on a personal appearance from Ray Parker Jr. to sing the Ghostbusters theme. Stu and Stephie apologize to Zelda and Andrew. Stu then tells them that they are not just a new couple but best friends. Stephie echoes the fear of losing Zelda, her own best friend. Andrew and Zelda pledge their lifetime friendship to their pals, who can never be replaced.
6	"F is for Fight, Fight, Fight!"	David Wain	Donald Diego	November 6, 2014	4X6806	2.74
When a man bumps into then insults Zelda outside an eatery, she owns the moment and defends herself, as Andrew prepares to do so. He is amazed, yet feels slightly emasculated. Later, Stu offers to lie in wait and randomly test Andrew's fighting reflexes, like the Cato character in The Pink Panther films. Andrew declines, but Stu makes no promises. Andrew then asks Zelda if she would have preferred him to step up. She tells him no, that she prefers level-headed, smart, and sensitive men like him. Stu finds a VHS tape from his and Andrew's childhood, featuring home footage of young Andrew in full jujutsu mode. He convinces Andrew to subtly show it to Zelda, to prove how tough he is. When he does, the martial arts tape has been spliced with footage of him performing in a musical at age ten. Outside, Andrew and Zelda walk, when an obnoxious sign-spinner dressed like Abraham Lincoln bumps into him. Not to be undone again, he brawls with Abe. He rips off the mask, and the offender is shown to be a woman. This angers Zelda, who later explains that she doesn't need a brute, but rather someone to support and listen to her and even help her make simple decisions. Her workload was crazy lately, and she needs someone to help her unwind. The next night, he shows up on her doorstep with takeout food from her favorite Thai restaurant. He has learned his lesson. As he sits in an easy chair, he is attacked again by Stu, who has been lying in wait a long time.
7	"G is for Geronimo"	Phil Traill	Rashida Jones & Will McCormack	November 13, 2014	4X6807	2.35
Zelda and Andrew merge their music collections. He later finds an audition demo file for a 16-year-old Zelda, but she intercepts and insists that he never listen to it. She explains that her childhood dream was to be a professional singer. Convinced it was an unwise career choice, she went to law school. At work, he shares his newly expanded music library, which accidentally allows his co-workers to hear her demo song. What's worse, one of his co-workers shared it with the office park and a number of file-sharing sites. People seem to love it. She wonders if she made the mistake of her life by not pursuing her music dreams. He calls it a sensible teenaged decision, but then she reveals that she also turned down an audition at the Berklee College of Music. He secretly begins researching local music academies, looking to give her a second chance. Being tricked into an open audition, she storms out, only to be convinced by him to return and sing her best. The conservatory leaves a message about her audition. She wants to listen to it with him, but is at peace with her childhood decision not to pursue a music career; if she had, she wouldn't have her satisfying law career, her great friends or Andrew. They start listening to the message together. Meanwhile, Stu discovers that Stephie is a trained psychic. He insists that she give him a psychic reading, and she ultimately comes up with the name "Geronimo". He had always idolized a Geronimo-model motorcycle from his childhood, but had never told anyone about it. He later spots a vintage Geronimo motorcycle for sale.
8	"H is for Hostile Takeover"	Henry Chan	Craig Gerard & Matthew Zinman	November 20, 2014	4X6808	2.44
At Wallflower, site traffic has increased, due to people hooking up, breaking up, and returning to the site. Andrew is annoyed; Wallflower used to be about creating long-lasting relationships, not just hookups. He reluctantly sends an email to Lydia to vent. The next day, she demotes him from his assistant marketing director job, giving it to Jordan. Seeing Andrew dejected, Stu insists on a "bro night" to help Andrew rediscover himself. This proves difficult. To make matters worse, new boss Jordan announces that they're getting rid of the matchmaking side of the company. Andrew explains plainly to Lydia that, if the company continues down the "hooking up" path, it won't last. They need to keep promoting love. Lydia gives Andrew a chance to prove himself and also gives him his job back. Zelda reassures him that his thoughts are his; others just provide a little encouragement and nudging.
9	"I is for Ill Communication"	Alex Hardcastle	Ben Queen & Sono Patel	December 11, 2014	4X6809	2.52
Andrew and Zelda decide to spend their first Christmas together. He enlists Stephie's help with finding the perfect gift and suggests Zelda gets Stu's help for him. Stephie helps Andrew find a gilded bracelet online. They celebrate over drinks, where he admits that he doesn't really want to spend Christmas with Zelda, because he has never missed the holiday with his dad. He makes her promise not to tell Zelda. Meanwhile, Stu and Zelda compete with each other to find a gift for Andrew. After some bonding, she also admits that she doesn't want to spend Christmas with Andrew, because she has never spent the holiday anywhere but with her family. She swears Stu to secrecy. Back at the apartment, Stu blurts out to Andrew that Zelda doesn't want to spend Christmas with him. Later, Andrew and Zelda decorate a tree, while Stu and Stephie watch from a distance. Minor squabbles lead to a full-blown outburst on the propriety of opening one gift on Christmas Eve. Andrew finally confesses that he doesn't want to spend Christmas with Zelda. She immediately responds with the same and then goes to book a flight home. At the airport, Andrew meets her to see her off. They wish each other a merry Christmas, then he quickly apologizes for the fight. He admits to feeling insecure, fearing that Zelda didn't like him as much as he liked her. Amazed, she admits to feeling the same way. Although reconciled, they still don't know what to do next. She heads off to her flight, then turns around to grab him and profess that she loves him. He reciprocates, and they are happier than ever even if it means spending the holidays apart.
10	"J is for Jan Vaughan"	Michael Patrick Jann	Ryan Koh & Ben Queen	January 1, 2015	4X6810	1.34
Zelda thinks Jennifer (Sarah Baker), a quirky temporary worker in her office, would be a perfect match for Stu. Andrew, from numerous prior attempts at setting Stu up, predicts failure. Zelda persists, and Stu and Jennifer quickly fall for each other. Stephie spots the foursome at the beer garden, and, while she doesn't harbor lingering affections for Stu, she's still appalled that Zelda has set him up with another woman. Zelda witnesses Stephie's tailspin—drinking heavily and reverting to a Cockney accent. Andrew offers to set Stephie up with a Wallflower profile to find a quality man. She is matched up with Joseph (Echo Kellum), a media staffer from New York. The three happy couples attend the company mixer, until Stephie and Joseph leave to have sex in his hotel room. Stu sees them leave and tells Jennifer that he is happy for Stephie. Jennifer quickly gets jealous over his concern for an ex. They argue, and she storms off, vowing to have nothing to do with him ever again. The next morning at Zelda's apartment, Andrew presses Stephie for details. She describes an amorous night, but, in the morning, found that Joseph had left $420 on the nightstand. Apparently, he thought she was a prostitute. By chance, Stu and Stephie ride the elevator down together, and later have "misery sex" at Andrew's place. Meanwhile, Zelda asks Jennifer to give Stu another chance, assuring that nothing will ever happen between Stu and Stephie again. Jennifer agrees, but they find the two in flagrante delicto. Jennifer storms out again. Later at the bar, Joseph arrives with flowers for Stephie. He is ready to have a proper date. Although Stu is still without love, Zelda and Andrew give themselves credit for matchmaking one of their two friends.
11	"K is for Keep Out"	Tristram Shapeero	Bill Callahan	January 8, 2015	4X6811	2.02
Andrew and Zelda have difficulty being alone together — Joseph and Stephie are all over each other at Zelda's place and a very needy Stu is at Andrew's place. Zelda and Andrew devise a plan to connect Joseph and Stu as buddies, just to get a few hours in Andrew's apartment to themselves. Joseph and Stu attend the Clippers game, and Zelda has dinner at Andrew's. Stephie bursts in, complaining about the new best friends. Stu returns later, effectively ending the romantic mood. Andrew and Stu argue, prompting Andrew to go apartment hunting. He asks Zelda for her opinion of a promising rental and she replies it is "perfect for us." They are both shocked that they have just agreed to be roommates. At the lease signing, they both are hesitant and do not sign. They agree it is just too soon; they'll know when the time is right. They plot an evening together but must both attend to Stephie and Stu's respective needs, only to learn that the two have prepared them a romantic dinner and, more importantly, have agreed to vacate the place for three days.
12	"L is for Likeability"	Michael Patrick Jann	Theresa Mulligan & Laura Gutin	January 15, 2015	4X6812	1.73
Andrew's father, Pete (Dan Lauria), is in town and wants to meet Zelda. Andrew is leery, as Pete has a history of scaring off his son's girlfriends. The real truth later comes out: Pete's longtime girlfriend left him, and he hoped to break up Andrew's current relationship for some father/son quality time. Pete thinks it is too late to find a worthy substitute for Andrew's mother, but urges Andrew to propose to Zelda. At Wallflower, Andrew and Stu create a dating profile for Pete, who passes on a couple candidates and then spots Stephie's profile. Zelda's shocked, but Andrew tells her he thinks Stephie would make a great stepmother.
13	"M is for Meant to Be"	Eric Appel	Ben Queen	January 22, 2015	4X6813	2.09
Zelda and Andrew's relationship is put to the test, when she is offered a partnership with the New York office and he lets a traveling ex, Madeline (Dreama Walker), stay at his place for a few nights. Zelda imagined Madeline has intentions on Andrew, despite being engaged to someone else. Madeline admits to it, explaining that she and Andrew once had a very special bond, to the point that he once told her the two of them were meant to be. Andrew explains that when he told that to Madeline, he actually believed it at the time. Now, he knows Zelda's the one. Dubious, Zelda pushes the point with an exasperated Andrew, who cannot guarantee that they're going to be together forever. Zelda reveals to him the New York partnership offer, and she has just decided that she's going to take it. A week later, he leaves her a remorseful voicemail, confessing that he has been naïve but never deceptive, and he knows that he only wants to be with her. Upon finishing the message, he spots her. She's back. They embrace and share a passionate kiss. Watching the reunion, Stu and Stephie share a proud moment, as they were secretly behind it. They ponder on their best friends getting married.

== Reception ==
=== Critical response ===
A to Z has received favorable reviews. Rotten Tomatoes gives the show a rating of 67% based on 48 reviews. The site's consensus states: "The leads are endearing, but A to Z's writing feels gimmicky and lacks a fresh perspective on the modern-day TV romance." Metacritic gives the show a score of 66 out of 100, based on reviews from 24 critics, indicating "generally favorable" reviews.

=== Ratings ===
No.	Title	Air date	Rating/share (18–49)	Viewers (millions)	DVR (18–49)	DVR viewers (millions)	Total (18–49)	Total viewers (millions)
1	"A is for Acquaintances"	October 2, 2014	1.2/3	4.79	0.4	0.95	1.6	5.74
2	"B is for Big Glory"	October 9, 2014	1.0/3	3.63	0.4	0.79	1.4	4.42
3	"C is for Curiouser and Curiouser"	October 16, 2014	1.0/3	3.37	0.4	0.83	1.4	4.20
4	"D is for Debbie"	October 23, 2014	0.9/3	3.13	0.2	0.54	1.1	3.67
5	"E is for Ectoplasm"	October 30, 2014	0.7/2	2.49	0.4	0.66	1.1	3.15
6	"F is for Fight, Fight, Fight!"	November 6, 2014	0.8/2	2.74	N/A	N/A	N/A	N/A
7	"G is for Geronimo"	November 13, 2014	0.6/2	2.35	N/A	N/A	N/A	N/A
8	"H is for Hostile Takeover"	November 20, 2014	0.7/3	2.44	N/A	N/A	N/A	N/A
9	"I is for Ill Communication"	December 11, 2014	0.8/2	2.49	N/A	N/A	N/A	N/A
10	"J is for Jan Vaughan"	January 1, 2015	0.4/1	1.34	N/A	N/A	N/A	N/A
11	"K is for Keep Out"	January 8, 2015	0.6/2	2.05	N/A	N/A	N/A	N/A
12	"L is for Likeability"	January 15, 2015	0.5/2	1.73	N/A	N/A	N/A	N/A
13	"M is for Meant to Be"	January 22, 2015	0.6/2	2.09	N/A	N/A	N/A	N/A
