= Christina Kirk =

American actress

- Occupation: Actress
- Spouse: John Hamburg (m. 2005)

Christina Kirk is an American actress.

== Career ==
Kirk appeared in Woody Allen's Melinda and Melinda and Ira Sachs' Love Is Strange. She was also a series regular on A to Z, and most recently played Jackie Swift in the DC Comics television series Powerless. Other television appearances include Fatal Attraction, Goliath, Younger, Girls and The Newsroom.

On stage, she has appeared in Clybourne Park by Bruce Norris at Playwrights Horizons and on Broadway; Knickerbocker for The Public Theater; There Are No More Big Secrets at Rattlestick Playwrights Theater; Will Eno's Oh, the Humanity and Other Exclamations at The Flea Theater; God's Ear at New Georges and The Vineyard; [sic] at Soho Rep; Well by Lisa Kron; and Infinite Life by Annie Baker at Atlantic Theater Company and London's Royal National Theatre.

== Filmography ==
=== Films ===
- 1998 Safe Men – Hannah
- 2002 Bug – Olive.
- 2004 Melinda and Melinda – Jennifer.
- 2004 D.E.B.S. (2004 film) – Madeleine.
- 2009 Taking Woodstock
- 2014 Love Is Strange – Mindy
- 2017 XX – Cora

=== Television series ===
- Fatal Attraction
- Goliath
- Younger
- Girls
- The Newsroom
- A to Z
- Powerless – Jackie Swift

== Personal life ==
Kirk married screenwriter John Hamburg on 24 September 2005.
