= Roadster =

Roadster may refer to:

== Transportation ==
- Roadster (car), an open, two-seat, often sporty car
  - Roadster utility, an automobile with an open-topped roadster body and a rear cargo bed
- Roadster (bicycle), a utilitarian bicycle, typically traditional in design
- Roadster (horse), a type of driving competition for horses
- A roadster motorcycle, another name for a standard

=== Vehicle models ===
==== Cars ====
- Haynes Roadster, a roadster sports car
- Mazda Roadster, also known as the Eunos Roadster, a sports car
- Morgan Roadster, a roadster sports car
- Panoz Roadster, a sports car
- Smart Roadster, a sports car
- Singer Roadster, a roadster touring car
- Tesla Roadsters
  - Tesla Roadster (first generation), an all-electric sports car from 2008 to 2012
  - Elon Musk's Tesla Roadster Elon Musk's Tesla Roadster launched in 2018 to deep space by SpaceX
  - Tesla Roadster (second generation), an upcoming all-electric sports car revealed in 2017 and 2026
- Triumph Roadster, a roadster touring car
- Mini Roadster, a sports compact car
- Eunos Roadster, a roadster sports car sold in Japan as a rebadged Mazda MX-5 (NA)
- YES! Roadster, a roadster sports car
- Porsche Boxster, a roadster sports car
- Porsche Speedster, a roadster sports car

==== Motorcycles ====
- Cagiva Roadster, a motorcycle

== Video games ==
- Roadster, a game in the Sports Collection, Japan-exclusive Game Boy video game
- Roadsters (video game) released for Nintendo 64, Sega Dreamcast, Sony PlayStation and Game Boy Color

== See also ==
- Speedster (disambiguation)
