= Proximity (2001 film) =

2000 film by Scott Ziehl

- Movie poster.
- Directed by: Scott Ziehl
- Screenplay by: Ben Queen
- Produced by: Alan Schechter
- Starring: Rob Lowe; Jonathan Banks; Kelly Rowan; Terrence 'T.C.' Carson; Joe Santos; Mark Boone Junior; David Flynn; James Coburn
- Production company: Zinc Entertainment
- Release date: 2001
- Running time: 100 min.
- Country: United States
- Language: English
- Budget: $5 million

Proximity (typeset as ProXimity) is a 2001 American action thriller film starring Rob Lowe and James Coburn, produced by Zinc Entertainment and released by Columbia TriStar Home Entertainment for DVD distribution. It is written by Ben Queen and Seamus Ruane and directed by Scott Ziehl. The film is about an escaped prison convict (Lowe) and the head/founder (Coburn) of a support group called "Justice For The Victim's Families" who has his tragic past and a dark secret.

== Plot ==
When William Conroy (Rob Lowe) a former college professor is sentenced to life in prison for vehicular manslaughter it seems his life is over. But, when a fellow inmate tells him that in the past two years fourteen inmates have died at the prison, and then turns up dead the next day, Conroy is in more danger than he ever imagined. His suspicions are confirmed when, while on the way to his parole hearing, the van carrying the inmates crashes. Seizing the opportunity, Conroy flees the scene and elicits the help of his lawyer (Mark Boone Junior). What the two discover is a grisly murder ring set up within the prison walls that incriminates those at the highest levels of the correctional system.

== Cast ==
- Rob Lowe as William Conroy
- Jonathan Banks as Price
- Kelly Rowan as Anne Conroy
- Terrence 'T.C.' Carson as Yaskin (Credited as T. C. Carson)
- Joe Santos as Clive Plummer
- Mark Boone Junior as Eric Hawthorne (Credited as Mark Boone Jr.)
- David Flynn as Lawrence
- James Coburn as Jim Corcoran.
- Scott Plate as David Dart
- Patrick E. Mahoney Jr. as Stephen Conroy
- Jack Sender as Glaser
- Anthony McKay as Richard Sherwood (Credited as Anthony McKay)
- Robert Ellis as Guard Pattison
- Osborne-Milstein Kimberley as Leah Gibson (Credited as Kim Osborne)
- Rick Williams as Cole
- Moses Israel as Cab Driver
- Emma Sciullo as Plummer's Daughter
- Jean Zarzour as Receptionist
- Bruce Kirkpatrick as Marcus Gibson
- Kurt Bryant as Security Guard
- Amanda Thomas as Cop Hadine
- Griff Allen as Cop Brett
- Morgan Lund as Large Prisoner
- Lydia Del Torto as Mother
- Diane Hageman as Marjorie
- Lee MacKay as Middle Aged Woman
- Christine Castro as Pushcart Woman
- Mitchell Fields as Husband
- Sonya A. Avakian as Bernice Gibson
- Mahyish Khan as Reporter
- Betsy Zajko as Daughter
- Catherine L. Albers as Helen
- James Kisicki as Frank (Credited as James P. Kisicki)
- Rohn Thomas as Marjorie's husband
- Marlynne Frierson Cooley as Twin's mother
- Brian Anthony Wilson as Twin's father
- Mary Elizabeth Boylan as Leah Gibson
- Gary Flamik as Self - Tower City crowd spectator
- Joy Lynne Fowler as Reporter
- Andy Schofield as Courtroom spectator

== Production ==
Joel Silver's Silver Pictures launched Zinc Entertainment as a low-budget production division and Proximity was its first production.
