= Days of Twang =

Studio album by De-Phazz
- Released: 2007

De-Phazz chronology
Natural Fake (2005)	Days of Twang (2007)	Big (2009)

Days of Twang is an album by De-Phazz, released on 23 March 2007.

== Track listing ==
No.	Title	Length
1.	"Twang"	0:32
2.	"Boogie Philosophy"	3:14
3.	"Nonsensical Thing"	3:51
4.	"Hell Alright"	3:14
5.	"Better World"	2:44
6.	"Le Petit Bastard"	2:33
7.	"It Will Turn Out Right"	4:15
8.	"Devil's Music"	2:26
9.	"Dancing with My Hands"	3:26
10.	"How High the Hat"	2:02
11.	"My Society"	3:39
12.	"Rock'n'Roll Dude"	1:57
13.	"Shadow of a Lie"	3:12
14.	"Whats the Use of...?"	2:39
15.	"105 FM Jam"	3:53
16.	"Devil's Music #58 Reprise"	0:58
