= Speedster =

Speedster may refer to:

== Transportation ==
=== Automotive ===
- Speedster (automobile), a type of car body closely related to the roadster
- Auburn Speedster, a speedster
- Little Detroit Speedster, also known as the Detroit Speedster, a cyclecar
- Opel Speedster, a roadster
- Studebaker Speedster, a hardtop coupe
- Confederate Hellcat Speedster, a motorcycle designed by South African Pierre Terblanche

=== Aircraft ===
- Kadiak KC-2 Speedster, a 1930s American radial engined homebuilt biplane design
- Rearwin Speedster, a 1930s American airplane design
- Theiss Speedster, an American biplane design

=== Watercraft ===
- Gar Wood Speedster, a racing boat

== Other uses ==
- Speedster (album), a studio album by Japanese boy band Generations from Exile Tribe
- Speedster (fiction), a character whose powers primarily relate to superhuman speed
- Speedster, a 1997 PlayStation game by Psygnosis

== See also ==
- Roadster (disambiguation)
