= Passant =

Passant may refer to:

- Passant, an attitude in heraldry
- The en passant capture, a move in chess
- George Passant, a 1940 novel by Charles Percy Snow
- Passant Shawky (born 1983), Egyptian actress

== See also ==
- En passant (disambiguation)
