= Moodorama =

- Origin: Regensburg, Germany
- Genres: Electronic
- Years active: 1998–present
- Labels: Mole Listening Pearls; Audiopharm; Shadow
- Members: Martin Sennebogen; Kerstin Huber; Bernhard Frank; Marco Köstler; Mario Malzer
- Website: www.moodorama.de

Moodorama is a German electronic music collective from Regensburg. Formed in 1998, Moodorama's music is influenced by jazz, lounge music, bossa nova and house music. The members of the group include Martin Sennebogen, Kerstin Huber, Bernhard Frank, Marco Köstler and Mario Malzer. As of 2007, Moodorama has its own record label music for collapsing people.

== Discography ==
=== Albums ===
- 2012: SIX (Mole Listening Pearls)
- 2006: My Name Is Madness (Mole Listening Pearls)
- 2005: Mystery in a cup of tea(Audiopharm)
- 2003: Listen (Audiopharm)
- 2000: Music for Collapsing people (Europe: Stereo Deluxe/United States: Shadow Records)
- 1998: Basement Music (Europe: Stereo Deluxe/United States: Shadow Records)

=== Singles ===
- 2008: Audiobahn (Mole Listening Pearls)
- 2007: Mind Traffic (Mole Listening Pearls)
- 2005: Furious Floods (Audiopharm)
- 2003: No Samba Me Criei (Audiopharm)
- 2003: Eye-Land (Audiopharm)
- 2003: Sweet Toffee (Audiopharm)
- 2000: Viama (Stereo Deluxe)
- 2000: Sinzing Sunset Boulevard (Stereo Deluxe)
