= Anima Sound System =

Hungarian electronic band

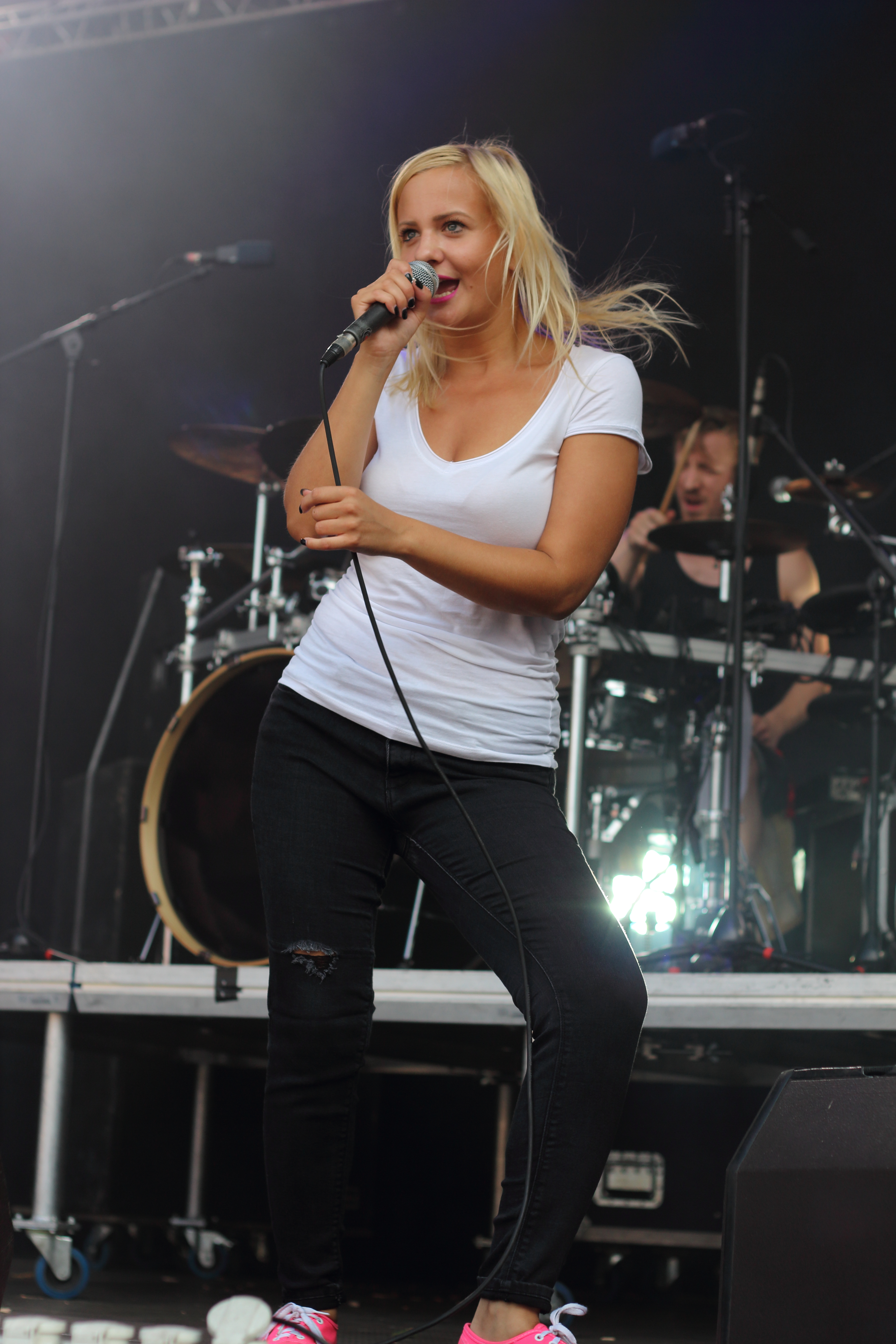
Anima Sound System at Picture on festival 2014

Anima Sound System is a Hungarian electronic band founded in 1993 in Szombathely. Anima is one of the first and most important Hungarian electronic acts, a unique fusion of Eastern-European folk music and modern electronic styles. The band is currently signed to the Mole Listening Pearls record label. The band soon developed strong ties with the underground Tilos Rádió station in Budapest. Their first international performance, in 1996, took place in Vienna at "Soundsfair Festival", (as the only Eastern-European act) along with bands like Red Snapper, Goldie and Nightmares on Wax.

Their remix of the Hungarian national anthem, Himnusz, was released on their Bujdosó EP and aired live from Tilos Radio's New Year party in 2000, then went on to cause controversy in Hungarian media.

Their sound developed from their early acid jazz-influenced albums to a more organic world music tone. Anima Sound System has undergone various changes in lineup since its formation, as well as numerous featured guest artists. Szabolcs Prieger and Zsolt Prieger remain from the original lineup, which had also featured Szilvia Bognár on vocals and dj Cadik on decks and turntables. After Judit Németh left the group as the main singer in 2004, Fanni Prieger, the daughter of founding member Zsolt Prieger, stepped up.

After touring Eastern European cities and capitals - 8 performances in Prague alone - Anima Sound System has begun to draw interest from Western European promoters - from the "Glashaus" in Berlin, to "Divan du Monde" in Paris.

== Discography ==
- Anima001 (1994) on Trottel Records
- Shalom (1995) released by the artist
- Hungarian Astronaut (1996) on Ko Records
- Anima (1997) on Ko Records
- Közel A Szerelemhez (1999)
- Mariguána Cha-Cha-Cha EP (1999)
- Bujdosó EP (2000)
- Gipsy Sound Clash (2000) on Hungaroton
- Aquanistan (2003) on EMI
- We Strike (2006) on CLS Records
- Tedd a napfényt be a számba (2010) on NarRator Records
- Gravity and Grace (2014) on Magneoton
- Anima & Animus (2018) on Anima Records

== Members ==
Gergely Németh, Szabolcs Prieger, Zsolt Prieger, Fanni Prieger (singer)

== Former members ==
Szilvia Bognár (singer), Judit Németh (singer, left in 2004), Pál Séfer
