= Night (David Tukhmanov song) =

Single by Nikolai Noskov

from the album Bez nazvaniya
- Released: 2012
- Genre: Art rock; Progressive rock
- Length: 4:41
- Label: HOFA
- Songwriters: David Tukhmanov; Vladimir Mayakovsky
- Producer: David Tukhmanov

Night (Russian: Ночь, romanized: Noch, incipit "Loves me, loves me not, I am struggling ...", also known under the title Unfinished (Note: Using the conventional name of the poem in the first complete collection of works (1955-1961) by Vladimir Mayakovsky.)) is a 1984 song composed by David Tukhmanov with lyrics based on the poem by Vladimir Mayakovsky which he penned before his death (1930, started in 1928), written by Tukhmanov for the beginning of Nikolay Noskov's solo career. The song aired only once in the USSR in the program "The Music Kiosk", because it was banned afterwards the severely critical article by Sergey Obraztsov in the newspaper "Soviet Culture". After 28 years, in 2012, "Night" was first recorded by Noskov on his solo album Bez nazvaniya.

== History ==
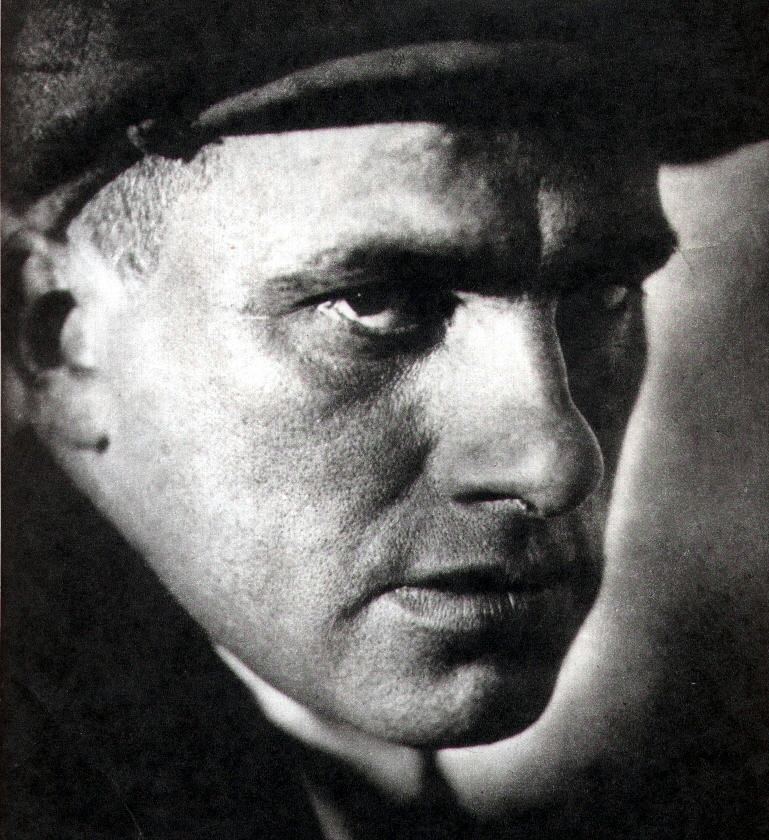
Vladimir Mayakovsky

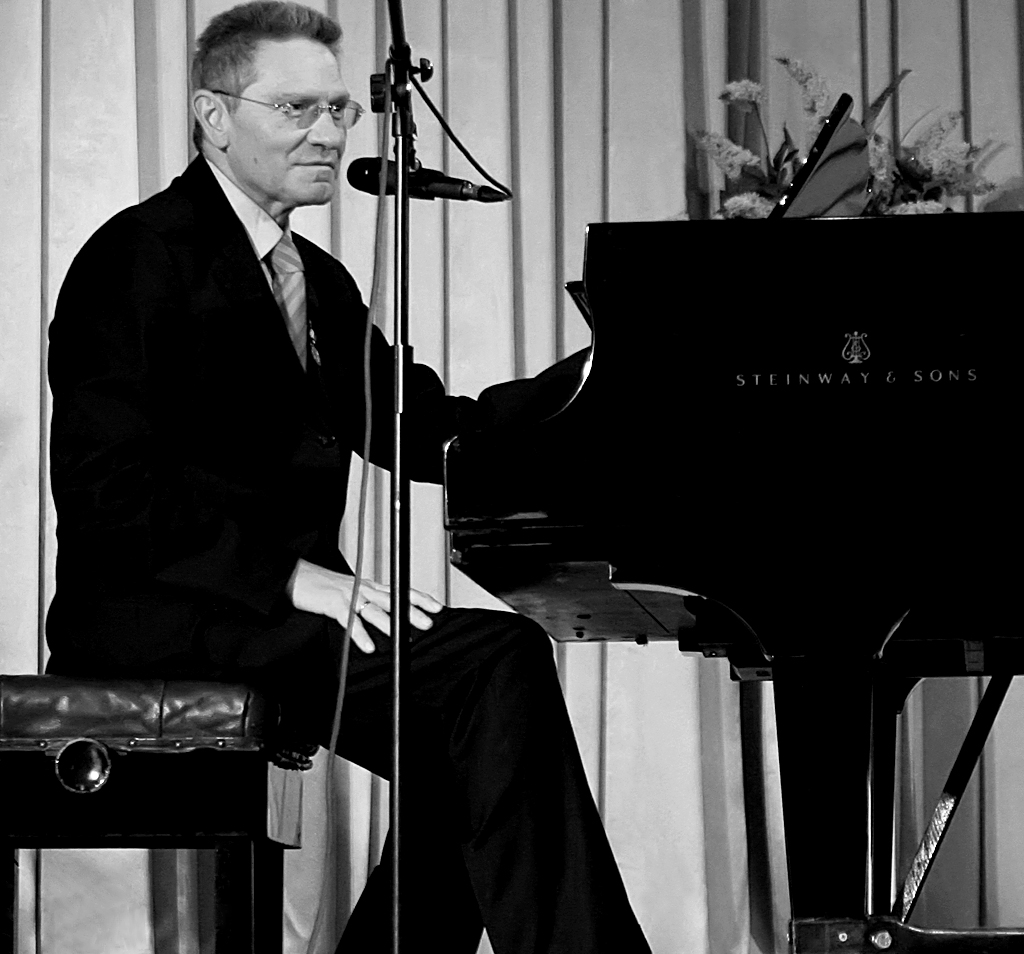
David Tukhmanov

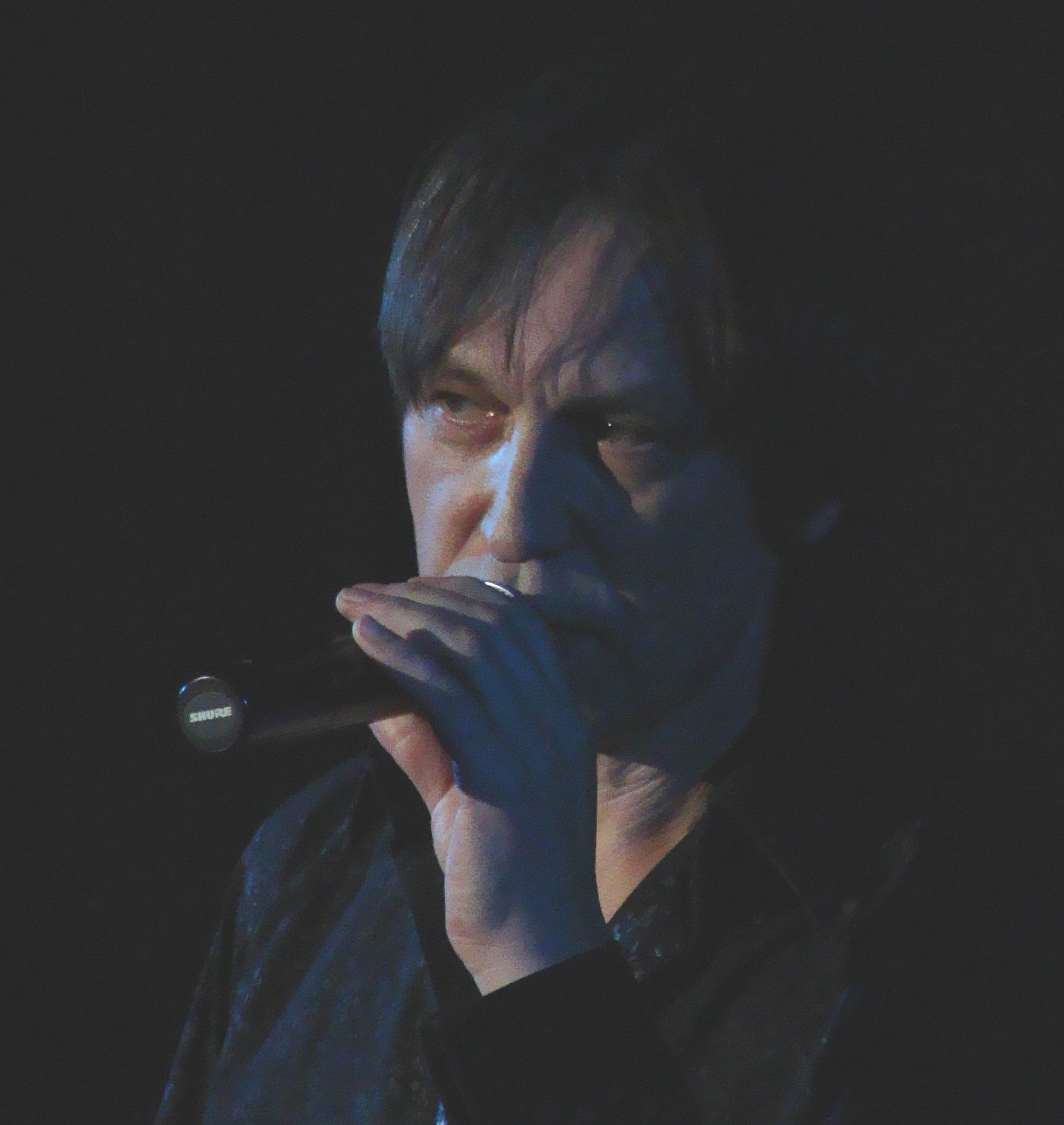
Nikolai Noskov

After the failure at the end of 1982 of the first and last album "UFO" of the group "Moscow" which he created, David Tukhmanov continued to formally lead the group by inertia, but did not organize its concerts nor offer any new songs. By early 1984, Tukhmanov, tired of the group's constant bans and the need to overcome them, completely took off the already ephemeral duties of a producer and group leader, and so the group practically disbanded. The key musician, the soloist of "Moscow", Nikolai Noskov, for whom Tukhmanov wrote almost all the songs of the group, and who at that time already began to work in the ensemble "Singing Hearts", he offered to start a solo career and for this purpose wrote the first song "Night" based on fragments of the unfinished poem of Vladimir Mayakovsky written around the time of his death, 1930 (started in 1928).

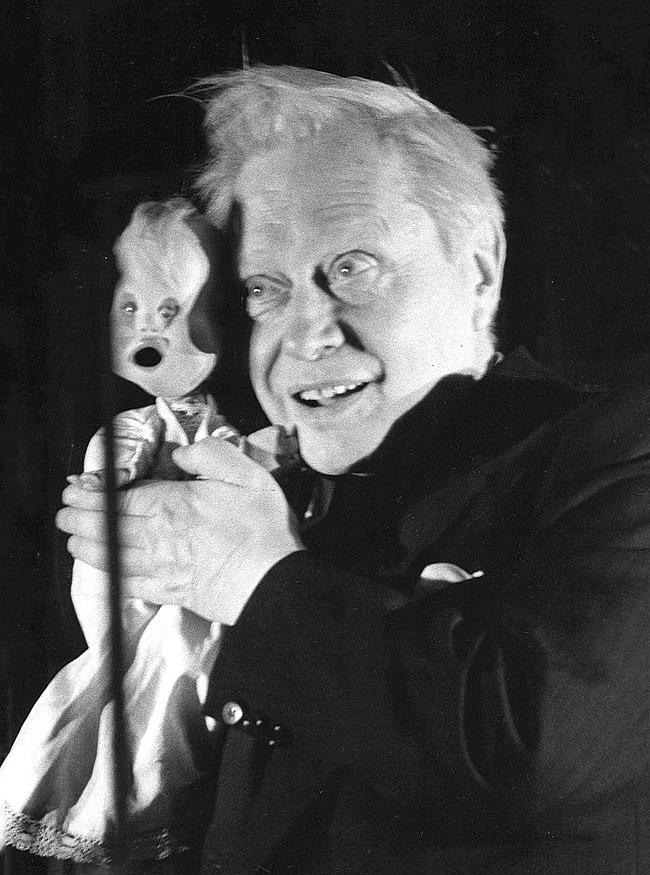
Sergey Obraztsov

In 1984, the song was recorded in Tukhmanov's studio and aired on the TV show "The Music Kiosk". The show was seen by Sergey Obraztsov, one of the major officially recognized theater figures of the USSR, a puppeteer who wrote a devastating article on the song in the newspaper "Soviet Culture". At the conclusion of his article, Obraztsov wrote: "I hope that this song will sound no more", after which "Night" was completely banned. Tukhmanov, after almost thirty years, recalled this: "An item appeared in the newspaper, in which it was written: how can you take such holy verses and make a pop song out of them?" Noskov found out some things regarding the prohibition, although no one even contacted him regarding this incident: "Tukhmanov said that the authorities do not like my vocal timbre". For Nikolai Noskov, the ban on the song became a landmark; not only the song was banned, but also him: "It seemed to me that if a composer like Tukhmanov made a song for Mayakovsky's verses, then perhaps it would not attract the attention of Soviet censorship. But I was wrong, the song became forbidden, like the one who performed it ..."

During the perestroika and after the collapse of the USSR, the ban on the song was lifted by itself, but Nikolai Noskov, who was first employed in the Gorky Park group, and then with his own songs in the solo career, performed "Night" rarely. Later the song returned to his repertoire, and in 2012, 28 years after the appearance of the song, Noskov first recorded it on his solo album Bez nazvaniya. In 2013, "Night" was performed by Nikolai Noskov in the television episode of "The Property of the Republic" entirely dedicated to the songs of David Tukhmanov, among eleven other Tukhmanov songs.

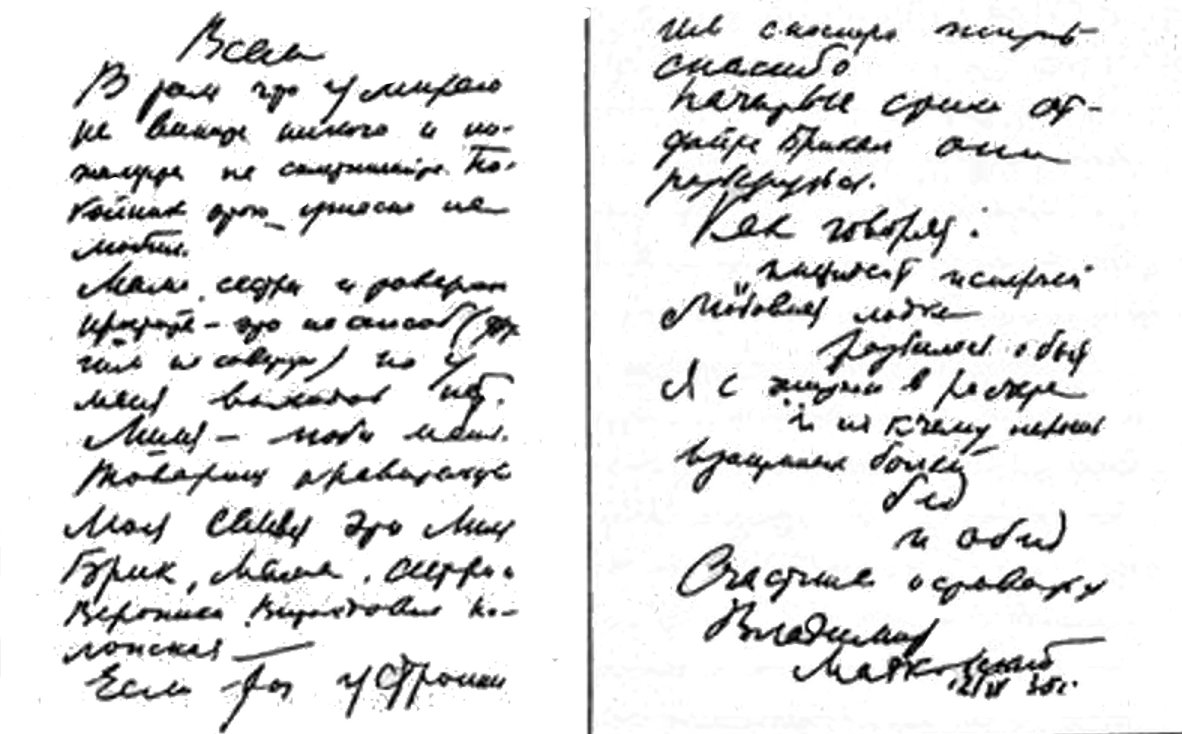
Mayakovsky's death note with the included lines of the last poem
