= Natural Fake =

Studio album by De-Phazz
- Released: 2005
- Genres: Electronica, jazz, funk
- Length: 66:33
- Label: Phazz A Delic

De-Phazz chronology
Plastic Love Memory (2002)	Natural Fake (2005)	Days of Twang (2007)

Natural Fake is the sixth album by German project De-Phazz.

== Track listing ==
No.	Title	Length
1.	"Un Ange Passe"	3:42
2.	"Waste of Words"	4:16
3.	"Astrud Astronette"	3:26
4.	"Stumble"	3:45
5.	"Depression Royale"	2:44
6.	"Eternity Is..."	3:23
7.	"Rise and Shine"	4:58
8.	"Excursion En Mer"	4:29
9.	"Love Is Natural"	3:57
10.	"Car Eats Town"	4:33
11.	"Keep It Simple"	4:22
12.	"Who the Pop Cares"	1:54
13.	"Backstreets of My Mind"	3:50
14.	"Multicoloured Destiny"	3:51
15.	"Make Heaven My Home"	3:44
16.	"Message to the Cool"	3:36
17.	"Close to Jazz"	2:21
18.	"Garbo Goodbye"	3:48

== Chart performance ==
Chart (2005)	Peak position
Austrian Album Chart (Austria)	55
German Album Chart (Germany)	33
Swiss Album Chart (Switzerland)	71
