= Ben Queen =

American writer and producer

Benjamin Queen is an American writer and producer. He was the creator/showrunner for the NBC television show A to Z. He wrote the screenplays for MGM's The Addams Family 2 and the Pixar animated movie Cars 2, and co-wrote the story for Cars 3. He was also the creator of the NBC television series, Powerless and the co-creator and executive producer of the Fox television series, Drive.

He is the author of the graphic novel Bear, which was published by Archaia and Boom! Studios in September 2020. It was listed one of the New York Public Library's 100 Books of the Year for 2020. In 2021 it was nominated for an Eisner Award for Best Publication for Early Readers. It won the EGLA Award for Best Children's Graphic Novel - Fiction.

He wrote and produced the pilot Heart of Life for ABC and 20th Television in 2019 which was based on the song by John Mayer.

He is adapting A Note of Explanation by Vita Sackville-West into a live-action feature film for Netflix.

== Movies ==
=== As a writer ===
- Proximity (2001)
- Cars 2 (2011) - screenplay
- Cars 3 (2017) - story
- The Addams Family 2 (2021) - screenplay

== Television ==
- Century City (Writer: 1 Episode) (2004)
- Drive (Co-Creator) (2007)
- A to Z (Creator) (2014-2015)
- Powerless (Creator) (2017)

== Books ==
- Bear Graphic Novel (2021)
