= The Addams Family 2 =

2021 animated film by Greg Tiernan and Conrad Vernon

- Theatrical release poster
- Directed by: Greg Tiernan; Conrad Vernon
- Screenplay by: Dan Hernandez Benji Samit; Ben Queen; Susanna Fogel
- Story by: Dan Hernandez; Benji Samit
- Based on: The Addams Family by Charles Addams
- Produced by: Gail Berman; Conrad Vernon; Danielle Sterling; Alison O'Brien
- Starring: Oscar Isaac; Charlize Theron; Chloë Grace Moretz; Nick Kroll; Javon Walton; Wallace Shawn; Snoop Dogg; Bette Midler; Bill Hader
- Edited by: Ryan Folsey
- Music by: Mychael Danna; Jeff Danna
- Production companies: Metro-Goldwyn-Mayer Pictures; Bron Studios; Jackal Group; Glickmania
- Distributed by: United Artists Releasing
- Release date: October 1, 2021 (United States)
- Running time: 93 minutes
- Countries: Canada; United States
- Language: English
- Budget: $23 million
- Box office: $119.8 million

The Addams Family 2 (also known as The Addams Family 2: Road Trip) is a 2021 animated supernatural black comedy film based on the characters created by Charles Addams and the standalone sequel to The Addams Family (2019). It was directed by Greg Tiernan and Conrad Vernon, and written by Ben Queen, Susanna Fogel, Dan Hernandez and Benji Samit, and a story by Hernandez and Samit. The film stars the voices of Oscar Isaac, Charlize Theron, Chloë Grace Moretz, Nick Kroll, Javon Walton, Wallace Shawn, Snoop Dogg, Bette Midler, and Bill Hader. It tells the story of the Addams family as they go on a road trip.

The film was theatrically released in the United States by United Artists Releasing on October 1, 2021, followed by an international release by Universal Pictures on October 8. It also became available for online rental on the same day in the United States and Canada. The film was not as successful as its predecessor and received generally negative reviews from critics. The film marks the final animated film to be distributed by United Artists Releasing before being folded into MGM on March 4, 2023, and the final animated film to be theatrically released by United Artists.

== Plot ==
At a science fair, Wednesday Addams is set to present her experiment, where she uses her pet octopus Socrates' DNA on Uncle Fester to show how humans can be improved (with the side effect of gradually transmutating Fester). However, she is dismayed when she sees her family arrive. Nonetheless, her work gets noticed by scientist Cyrus Strange. Back at the Addams' home, Gomez worries that the children are drifting apart from him and Morticia, so he decides to take them on a family vacation. Before the family, Fester, Thing and Lurch head on a road trip across the United States, Gomez and Morticia are approached by a lawyer named Mr. Mustela, who claims that Wednesday was switched at birth and may not actually be an Addams, but they ignore him. On the road, the Addams family is pursued by Mustela and his employer's henchman Pongo.

The family is initially set on going to Salem, Massachusetts, but Fester, who is slowly mutating due to the experiment, ends up making a detour to Niagara Falls. The family later stops in Sleepy Hollow, New York. Gomez and Morticia bring up Mustela and his claims about Wednesday, so Fester mentions a story when he visited Wednesday the day she was born and juggled babies in the delivery room. This only worsens Gomez and Morticia's fears that Wednesday may not be their biological child, which Wednesday overhears.

Gomez brings everyone to Miami to get in touch with Cousin Itt, in hopes he can help with their current dilemma. Itt joins them on the trip as they pass through San Antonio and leaves the family early at the Grand Canyon. Meanwhile, Wednesday traps Mustela in a rope trap on her own and learns he is working for Cyrus before "letting him go". Cyrus suggests to Wednesday that he is her true father and invites her to his home in Sausalito, California. Wednesday runs a DNA test using Gomez's hair, which seemingly proves that she is not his daughter. Wednesday leaves the family while they sleep, but Lurch catches up with her. The rest of the Addams learn where she is heading and follow suit.

At his home, Cyrus shows Wednesday a formula he developed to make human–animal hybrids, similar to Wednesday's experiment. When the rest of the Addams family shows up, Wednesday is persuaded to stay with Cyrus. After Pugsley finds out that Cyrus' daughter Ophelia is a pig, Cyrus reveals he is using Wednesday, as her formula was better than his. He captures the family to test on them, but Wednesday refuses to do so. Cyrus tries to get Pongo to go after her, but it is revealed Lurch and Pongo knew each other before while in a mental asylum and they decide to free the Addams. Cyrus comes into contact with his formula during the scuffle and turns into a hybrid chicken-cow-goat-pig monster. Disgusted by Wednesday's compassion, Cyrus admits that the DNA results were fake and Wednesday is not his daughter. Feeling that Wednesday is no longer any use to him, Cyrus tries to kill the family, but is stopped by Fester who has fully mutated into an octopus monster. After the two fight, Cyrus falls off a cliff onto a marriage proposal. Fester is turned back to normal by Wednesday using a necklace given to her by Morticia that contains the family's blood.

Wednesday reunites with her family and they return home along with Pongo and Ophelia, the latter of whom has become fully human following contact with Wednesday's formula and falls in love with Pugsley. Gomez then reveals to Wednesday that he has worn a toupée ever since he lost his real hair in a napalm accident. He promises the family that next time, he will take them on a trip across the world.

== Voice cast ==
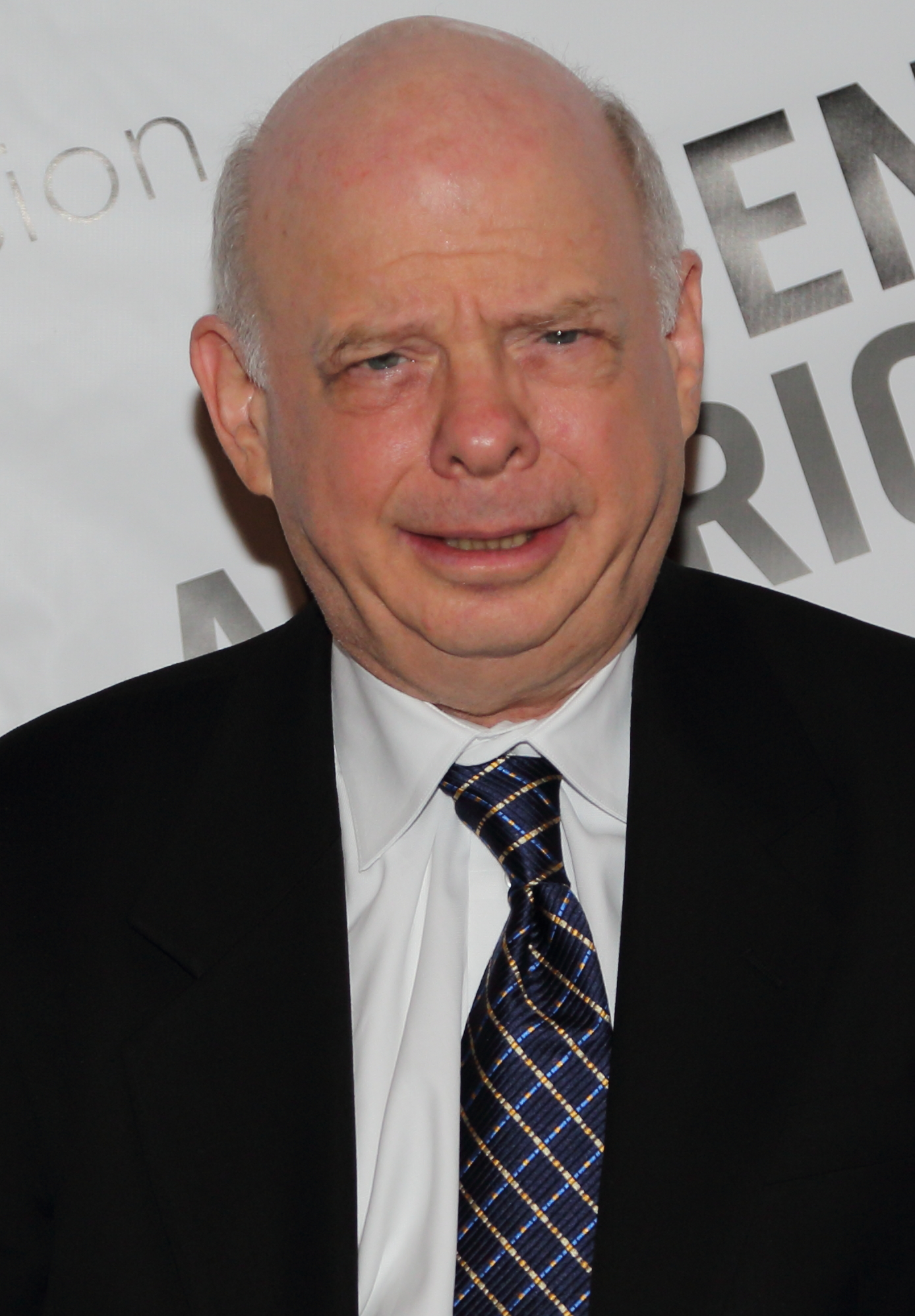
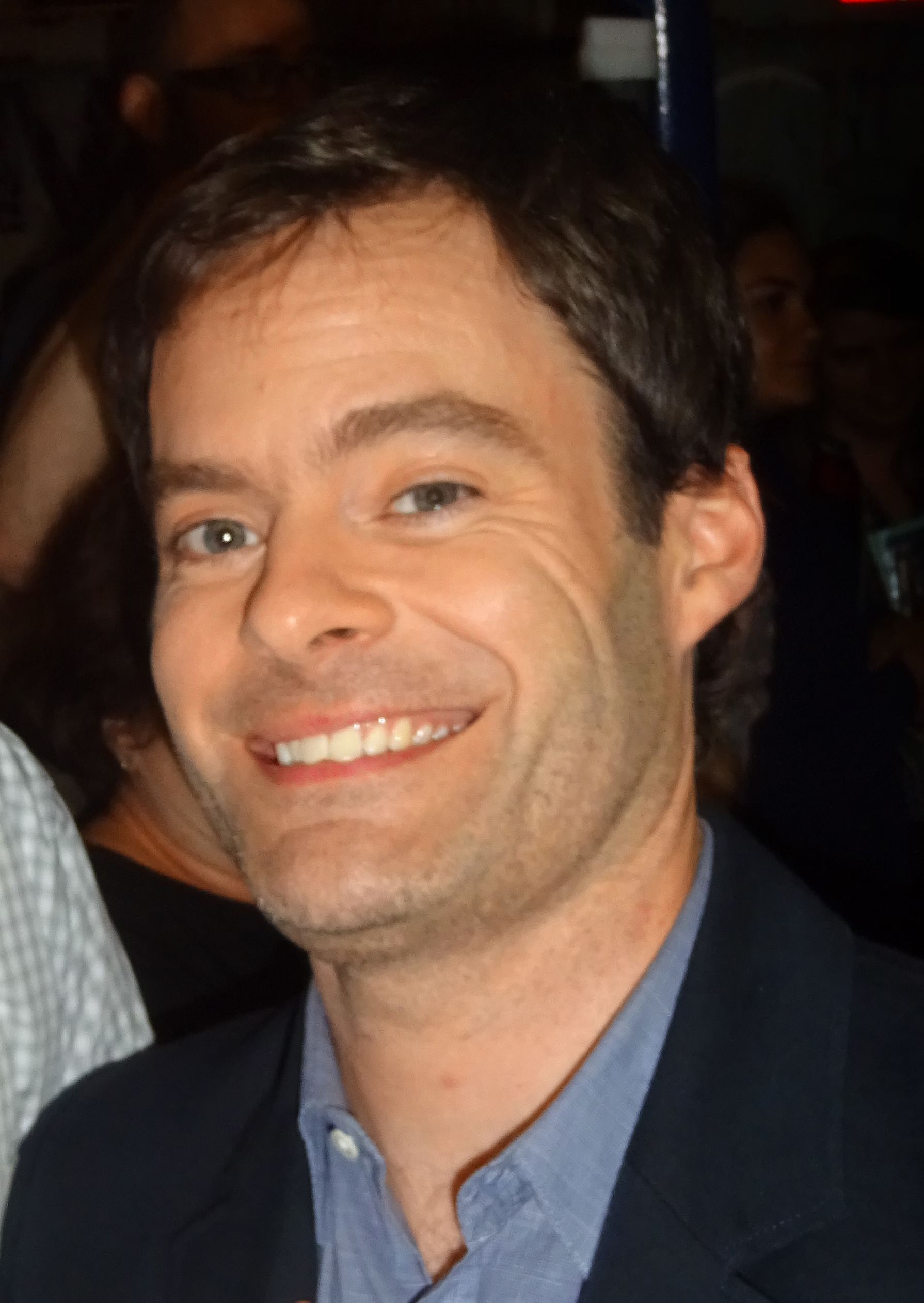
Wallace Shawn and Bill Hader voiced antagonists Mr. Mustela and Dr. Cyrus Strange, respectively.
- Oscar Isaac as Gomez Addams, Morticia's husband and Wednesday's and Pugsley's father.
- Charlize Theron as Morticia Addams (née Frump), Gomez's wife and Wednesday's and Pugsley's mother.
- Chloë Grace Moretz as Wednesday Addams, Gomez and Morticia's daughter, Pugsley's older sister, and a mad science child prodigy.
- Nick Kroll as Uncle Fester, Gomez's brother who Wednesday used in an experiment involving Socrates' DNA.
- Javon Walton as Pugsley Addams, Gomez and Morticia's son and Wednesday's younger brother. Walton replaces Finn Wolfhard from the 2019 film due to Wolfhard’s voice changing.
- Bette Midler as Grandmama Addams, Gomez and Fester's mother.
- Conrad Vernon as
  - Lurch, the Addams Family's butler.
    - Dominic Lewis provides Lurch's singing voice for a rendition of Gloria Gaynor's "I Will Survive"
  - The spirit who haunts the Addams' house
- Snoop Dogg as Cousin Itt, Gomez and Fester's hairy cousin.
- Bill Hader as Cyrus Strange, a scientist who claims that he is Wednesday's biological father.
- Wallace Shawn as Mr. Mustela, Cyrus' lawyer who is pursuing the Addams family.
- Brian Sommer as Big Bad Ronny, a tough biker who helps Wednesday and Lurch get to Sausalito, California.
- Griffin Burns as a dorky boy at a science fair.
- Courtenay Taylor as Girl in Water
- Ted Evans as Pongo, Cyrus and Mr. Mustela's hulking henchman who mostly makes sounds and is old friends with Lurch.
- Cherami Leigh as Ophelia, Cyrus' daughter whom he created from a pig.
- Mary Faber as:
  - Miss Lurleen, the bartender of a biker bar that Big Bad Ronnie's biker gang visited.
  - Texas Lady
  - Pageant Lady
  - A PA announcer for the Cyrus Strange Foundation
- Ava Luna Floisand as Corney Girl
- Kyla Pratt as:
  - Book Girl
  - A kid at a science fair who worked on a volcano project
  - Festival Kid #1
  - Peggy, a girl at a pageant in San Antonio who gets frightened when Wednesday does her possessed voice towards her.
- Charlet Chung as:
  - Madison, a girl who is being proposed to.
  - Festival Kid #2
  - Girl on Beach
  - A dorky girl at a science fair
- Kyle Chapple as:
  - A proposing guy whose marriage proposal keeps getting disrupted by the Addams Family's shenanigans.
  - Jerk on Beach
  - Truck Driver
- Peter James King III as Merch Guy
- Bryson Queinn as Festival Kid #3

== Production ==
On October 15, 2019, following the 2019 film's successful opening weekend, it was announced that a sequel to the film was scheduled to be theatrically released on October 22, 2021, and that Greg Tiernan and Conrad Vernon would return to direct the film. Cinesite Studios was again a production partner on the film and provided CG animation and digital visual effects for the sequel. 2D animation from the credits was provided by Creative Capers Entertainment.

Most of the original actors returned, while in October 2020, Bill Hader and Javon Walton joined the cast, with Hader as a new character named Cyrus and Walton replacing Finn Wolfhard as the voice of Pugsley Addams. In July 2021, Wallace Shawn was revealed to have voiced a new character.

=== Music ===
In July 2021, Mychael Danna and Jeff Danna were announced to have composed the score for The Addams Family 2, as with the first film. In September 2021, Maluma, Megan Thee Stallion, and Rock Mafia created a new song called "Crazy Family", while "My Family" gets a remix by Yoshi Flower. Dominic Lewis, composer of Peter Rabbit, did a cover of "I Will Survive" for Lurch at the bar. Similar to the previous film's ending, an updated version of Vic Mizzy's theme from the original TV series plays in the ending, this time performed by Christina Aguilera, who provided the previous film's opening song.

== Release ==
The Addams Family 2 was theatrically released in the United States by United Artists Releasing and internationally by Universal Pictures on October 1, 2021. The film also became available for online rental on the same day.

It was previously scheduled for release on October 22 and October 8. On January 21, 2021, it was moved up to October 1, 2021, allowing the James Bond film No Time to Die (another MGM title) to take over the October 8 slot. In June 2021, United Artists Releasing announced they did not plan on rescheduling The Addams Family 2, in the wake of Hotel Transylvania: Transformania moving to the same weekend (which later moved to January 14, 2022). In August 2021, the film shifted its release for online rental to the same day as its theatrical bow in the United States and Canada, due to the COVID-19 pandemic.

=== Home media ===
The film was released on Blu-ray and DVD on January 18, 2022, by Universal Pictures Home Entertainment.

== Reception ==
=== Box office ===
The Addams Family 2 grossed $56.5 million in the United States and Canada, and $63.5 million in other territories, for a worldwide total of $120 million.

In the United States and Canada, The Addams Family 2 was released alongside Venom: Let There Be Carnage and The Many Saints of Newark, and was projected to gross $15–17 million from 4,207 theaters in its opening weekend. The film made $5.5 million on its first day, including $550,000 from Thursday night previews. It went on to debut to $17.3 million, finishing second, behind Let There Be Carnage. The film dropped 42% in its second weekend to $10 million, finishing third. It finished in fourth place during its third weekend at the box office, declining 30% to $7.1 million.

=== Critical response ===
On review aggregation website Rotten Tomatoes, the film holds an approval rating of 28% based on 112 reviews, with an average rating of 4.6/10. The website's critical consensus reads, "Altogether ooky, and not in a good way." Metacritic assigned the film a weighted average score of 37 out of 100, based on 23 critics, indicating "generally unfavorable reviews". Audiences polled by CinemaScore gave the film an average grade of "B" on an A+ to F scale, while those at PostTrak gave it an 87% positive score, with 73% saying they would definitely recommend it.

Owen Gleiberman of Variety wrote positively on the film, "It's in the nature of most animated sequels to struggle to recapture the full charm of the original hit. But in the case of The Addams Family 2, Tiernan and Vernon have used the sequel as an opportunity for an upgrade. The script is by an entirely new team, and in some ineffable bats-in-the-belfry way the jokes now land with a more inspired and spontaneous creepy kookiness." Savannah Lee of Parent Previews criticized the film, writing "I didn't see the 2019 version of The Addams Family because it didn't look appealing and my son was too young to clamor for it. I read a quick plot synopsis to get myself caught up, but I probably didn't need to. This movie has little, if anything, to do with the previous installment, so you can just jump right in if you so choose." Nell Minow of RogerEbert.com gave a 3 out of 4 stars and wrote, "An intrusive product placement billboard will trigger the irritation viewers may have with the odd cross-promotion in television commercials on behalf of both this movie and an insurance company. Of more concern, parents may get some tough questions due to the paternity issues raised by the film, including DNA tests. The issues of who a child 'belongs' to and what biology has to do with identity will be a concern for some families."

Sandie Angulo Chen of Common Sense Media gave the film 3 stars out of 5 and wrote "Silly sequel focuses on family love; peril, some racy jokes." Meagan Navarro of Bloody Disgusting gave 2 bones out of 5 and wrote "The Addams Family 2 might change its scenery, but it doesn't deviate from its approach. It's still a ridiculous, straightforward animated update to an enduring property. Grown-ups may disown this take on The Addams Family, but it was never meant for adults anyway. This focuses solely on tickling the funny bone of the youngest of audiences. In other words, it's not a great movie, but it likely succeeds in its goal as a manic comedy bit for children. That it steps further away from a grim aesthetic means it's a far more anemic gateway into the genre than before." Molly Freeman of Screen Rant called the film "a shallow continuation that spends too much time on unconnected hijinks resulting in an uneven sequel with much less heart."

=== Accolades ===
Mychael and Jeff Danna won Best Original Score in an Animated Film at the 12th Hollywood Music in Media Awards. At the 49th Annie Awards, storyboard artist Steven Garcia received a nomination for Best Storyboarding – Feature. Theron's performance was nominated for Favorite Voice from an Animated Movie at the 2022 Kids' Choice Awards. At the 47th Saturn Awards, the film received a nomination for Best Animated Film.

== See also ==
- The Addams Family (1973 TV series) – A short-lived TV series detailing the road trip of the Addams Family.
