= Kadiak KC-2 Speedster =

General information
- Type: Homebuilt aircraft
- National origin: United States
- Manufacturer: Kadiak
- Designer: Everett E. David
- Number built: 1

History
- First flight: 1931
- Developed from: Kadiak KC-1 Speedster

The Kadiak KC-2 Speedster is an American single-seat, radial engined homebuilt biplane designed prior to World War II.

== Design and development ==
The KC-2 was an original design of Everett E. David, built in 1931.

The aircraft was built with a welded steel tube fuselage, wooden wings, and fabric covering. It originally used a 95 hp (71 kW) Velie M-5 5-cylinder radial engine, later replaced with a similar but more powerful 90 hp (67 kW) Lambert, and was designed for engines up to 145 hp (108 kW).

== Operational history ==
The designer sold the KC-2 in 1939. It was storm damaged post-war, rebuilt and re-licensed, remaining active until at least 1977.

== Specifications ==
Data from Experimenter

General characteristics

- Length: 16 ft 8 in (5.08 m)
- Wingspan: 19 ft 10 in (6.05 m)
- Height: 7 ft 6 in (2.29 m)
- Wing area: 104 sq ft (9.7 m^{2})
- Airfoil: Clark Y, NACA M1
- Empty weight: 760 lb (345 kg)
- Gross weight: 1,080 lb (490 kg)
- Powerplant: 1 × Lambert R-267 5- cylinder radial, 90 hp (67 kW)

Performance

- Maximum speed: 132 kn (152 mph, 245 km/h)
- Cruise speed: 110 kn (130 mph, 210 km/h)
- Range: 456 nmi (525 mi, 845 km)
- Service ceiling: 16,000 ft (4,900 m)
- Rate of climb: 1,100 ft/min (5.6 m/s)
- Wing loading: 10.4 lb/sq ft (51 kg/m^{2})
