= Barbara Lahr =

German musician

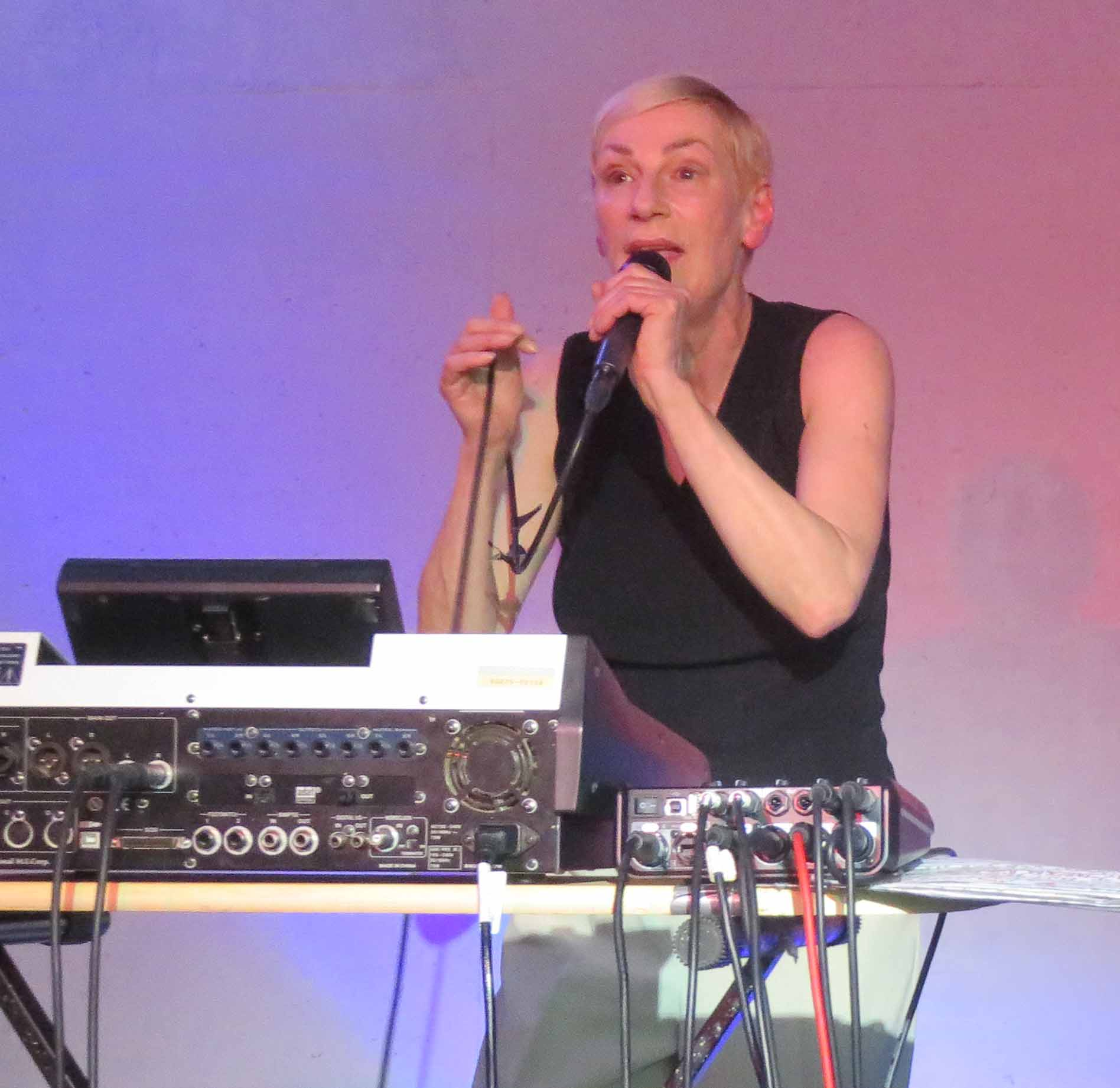
Barbara Lahr in July 2019

Barbara Lahr (born 25 September 1957 in Kaiserslautern) is a German singer, composer, bassist, guitarist, and producer best known for her collaboration with German Nu Jazz group De-Phazz.

== Career ==
In 1980, Barbara Lahr started her career as a singer with the band The Spunks. From 1984 till 1988 and again in 1993, she was the singer and guitarist of the German band Guru Guru.

== Awards ==
- 1989 Deutscher Rockpreis (German Rock Award)
- 1990 Studiopreis des WDR

== Filmography ==
- Raven - Black Magic Rock (1996) ( for Arte TV)

== Discography ==
Solo

- Lyrical Amusement (1998)
- Rainbow Line (2002)
- Undo Undo (2007)
- Six String Call (2012)

with de Phazz

- Detunized Gravity (1997)
- Death by Chocolate (2001)
- Daily Lama (2002)
- Natural Fake (2005)
- Days of Twang (2007)
- Big (2009) feat. Radio Bigband Frankfurt
- Lala 2.0 (2010)

with others

- New Flowers (1987) with Sanfte Liebe
- Passport Rmx Vol.1 /2001) with Klaus Doldinger
