= De-Phazz =

German band

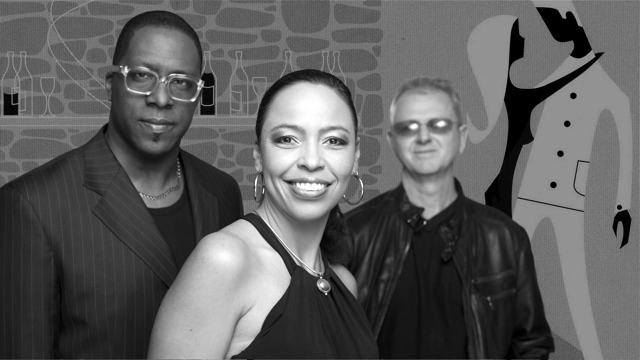
- From left to right: Karl Frierson, Pat Appleton and Pit Baumgartner.

Background information
- Origin: Heidelberg, Germany
- Genres: Downtempo, jazz, turntablism, latin, soul, lounge, trip hop, drum and bass
- Years active: 1997–present
- Label: Phazz-a-delic
- Members: Karl Frierson; Pat Appleton; Pit Baumgartner
- Website: dephazz.com

De-Phazz is a German downtempo and jazz ensemble founded in 1997, whose music integrates modern turntablism and elements of Latin, soul, trip hop and drum and bass into a lounge music sound. De-Phazz is led by Pit Baumgartner, a German producer who has varied the lineup of band members for every new album. However, some regular members are Barbara Lahr, Karl Frierson and Pat Appleton. Discoverer and namesake of De-Phazz was Haluk Soyoğlu, who also released the first albums on Mole and later on founded Phazz-a-delic New Format Recordings (https://phazzadelic.com) as innovative music label together with Pit Baumgartner.

The group has released records on Mole Listening Pearls and Universal Jazz Germany along with single releases on Edel Records and United Recordings, and also remixes existing material.

== Releases ==
- Detunized Gravity (1997)
- Godsdog (1999)
- Death by Chocolate (2001)
- Daily Lama (2002)
- Plastic Love Memory (2002)
- Natural Fake (2005)
- Days of Twang (2007)
- Big (2009)
- Lala 2.0 (2010)
- Audio Elastique (2012)
- Naive (2013)
- The Uppercut Collection (2013)
- Garage Pompeuse (2015)
- Private (2016)
- Prankster Bride (2016)
- Black White Mono (2018)
- De-Phazz & STÜBAphilharmonie - De Capo (2019)
- Music to Unpack your Christmas Present (2020)
- Live In Vilnius (2021) (2021 - MP3, 2023 - Vinyl)
- Jelly Banquet (2022)
- Pit Sounds (2024)
- presents De-Drums (2024)
- Luck You! (2025)
