= Shallow and Profound =

Shallow And Profound

Studio album by Yonderboi
- Released: 2000 (Germany)
- Recorded: 2000
- Genre: electronic
- Length: 66:22
- Label: YONDERLAND
- Producer: Yonderboi

Yonderboi chronology
Shallow And Profound (2000)	Splendid Isolation (2005)

Shallow and Profound is the first studio album recorded by Yonderboi. It was released in 2000.

== Track listing ==
All lyrics are written by Yonderboi

No.	Title	Music	Producer(s)	Length
1.	"Intro"	Yonderboi	Yonderboi	1:03
2.	"Milonga Del Mar"	Yonderboi	Yonderboi	8:44
3.	"Chase And Chaser"	Yonderboi	Yonderboi	3:41
4.	"Cantaloupe Island"	Yonderboi	Yonderboi	1:09
5.	"Ohne Chanteuse"	Yonderboi	Yonderboi	3:28
6.	"No Answer From Petrograd"	Yonderboi	Yonderboi	4:32
7.	"100% Trevira"	Yonderboi	Yonderboi	2:52
8.	"Pabadam"	Yonderboi	Yonderboi	3:59
9.	"The Severance"	Yonderboi	Yonderboi	0:23
10.	"Sinking Slowly"	Yonderboi	Yonderboi	4:52
11.	"Bodysurf"	Yonderboi	Yonderboi	4:04
12.	"Riders On The Storm/Pink Solidism"	Yonderboi	Yonderboi	4:19
13.	"Road Movie"	Yonderboi	Yonderboi	6:50
14.	"Thousand Bells"	Yonderboi	Yonderboi	4:46
15.	"Fairy Of The Lake"	Yonderboi	Yonderboi	5:08
16.	"Another Geometry"	Yonderboi	Yonderboi	5:13
17.	"Outro"	Yonderboi	Yonderboi	1:19

== Contributors ==
- Benski - words (track 1)
- Bootsie - scratch (track 1, 5, 7, 11, 15)
- Edina Kutzora - vocals (track 2, 3, 8, 14)
- Dániel Váczi - saxophones (track 2, 3, 5)
- Árpád Vajdovich - bass (track 2, 3, 6, 7, 13)
- Dr. Zsombor Zrubka - vibraphone (track 8, 15)
- David Yengibarian - accordion (track 4, 6)
- Balázs Zságer - keyboards (track 2, 3, 7, 13, 14, 16), fender rhodes (track 8, 12, 16), comb (track 7)
- Andor Kovács - guitar (track 3, 9, 10, 13)
- Zoltán Tombor - cover photo
