= Lemongrass (music) =

German music project and record label

Lemongrass is a music project created by German DJ and producer Roland Voss in 1996. Voss and his brother Daniel formed the Lemongrassmusic label in 2005. Lemongrass is known for a style that mixes electronic music, EDM, downtempo, drum-n-bass, lounge, jazz, soul, trip-hop, Chillout, world music, meditation music, deep ambient, New Age, and other influences.

== Discography ==
Studio albums

- 1998: Drumatic Universe (Incoming!)
- 1999: Lumière Obscure (Mole Listening Pearls)
- 2000: Voyage au Centre de la Terre (Mole Listening Pearls)
- 2001: Windows (Mole Listening Pearls)
- 2002: Solar Incense (Receptortune)
- 2003: Skydiver (Mole Listening Pearls/Receptortune)
- 2004: Fleur Solaire (Mole Listening Pearls/Receptortune)
- 2005: Ikebana (Lemongrassmusic)
- 2007: Filmothèque (Lemongrassmusic)
- 2007: Rendez-vous (Receptortune)
- 2008: Pour L'amour (Lemongrassmusic)
- 2009: Hypnosis (Lemongrassmusic)
- 2010: The 5th Dimension (Lemongrassmusic)
- 2011: Sirius (Lemongrassmusic)
- 2012: Papillon (Lemongrassmusic)
- 2013: A Dream Within A Dream (Lemongrassmusic)
- 2014: Mémoires (Lemongrassmusic)
- 2015: Meditation (Lemongrassmusic)
- 2016: Beauty (Lemongrassmusic)
- 2017: Orion (Lemongrassmusic)
- 2018: Unite (Lemongrassmusic)
- 2019: Earth (Lemongrassmusic)
- 2019: Imagine (Lemongrassmusic)
- 2021: Touch (Lemongrassmusic)
- 2021: Smile (Lemongrassmusic)
- 2022: Flow (Lemongrassmusic)
- 2022: Trust in love (Lemongrassmusic)
- 2022: Golden Sun (Lemongrassmusic)
- 2022: Chance (Lemongrassmusic)
- 2023: Dreams of Maya (Lemongrassmusic)
- 2023: Mosaic (Lemongrassmusic)
- 2024: Mirror of Life (Lemongrassmusic)
- 2024: Birdy (Lemongrassmusic)
- 2024: Lotus (Lemongrassmusic)
- 2024: Solace (Lemongrassmusic)
- 2024: Reverie (Lemongrassmusic)
- 2024: Gloria (Lemongrassmusic)
- 2024: Mirage (Lemongrassmusic)
- 2025: Candlelight (Lemongrassmusic)
- 2024: Arura (Lemongrassmusic)
- 2024: Mellow magic (Lemongrassmusic)
- 2024: Journey backwards (Lemongrassmusic)

EPs

- 1999: Comme toujours (Mole Listening Pearls)
- 2007: Ambient Land (Lemongrassmusic)
- 2008: Habla mi corazón (Lemongrassmusic)
- 2010: Ambient Land 2 (Lemongrassmusic)
- 2011: Sans Souci (Lemongrassmusic)
- 2012: Gloriette (Lemongrassmusic)
- 2013: Ambient Land 3 (Lemongrassmusic)
- 2016: Time Machine (Lemongrassmusic)
- 2016: Ambient Land 4 (Lemongrassmusic)
- 2018: Grapes (Lemongrassmusic)
- 2018: Ambient Land 5 (Lemongrassmusic)
- 2019: Seven - feat. Jane Maximova (Lemongrassmusic)
- 2019: Space Odyssey (Lemongrassmusic)
