= Yonderboi =

Hungarian composer and music producer

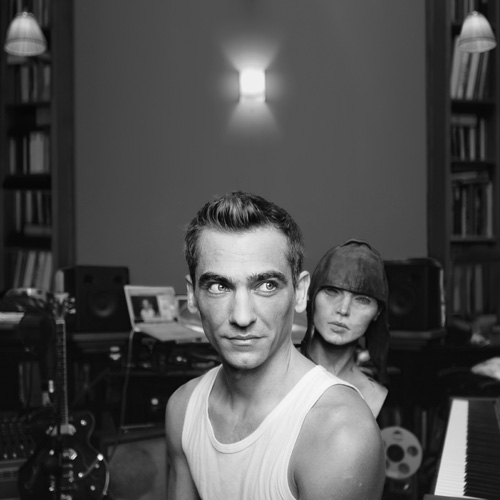
- Born: László Fogarasi Jr. September 14, 1980 (age 45); Kaposvár, Hungary
- Occupation: composer / music producer / visual artist
- Years active: 1998 - present
- Notable work: Shallow And Profound, Splendid Isolation, Passive Control
- Style: Indie pop
- Website: yonderboi.com

László Fogarasi Jr. (born September 14, 1980), known by his stage name Yonderboi, is a Hungarian composer, music producer and visual artist. His debut album, Shallow and Profound, released in 2000, brought Eastern European music to the Western European electronic music scene, and was met with critical acclaim by producers Laurent Garnier and Gilles Peterson on Radio Nova and BBC Radio 1 Worldwide respectively, as well as performing at the Sziget festival and the Lowlands festival in 2000. His most notable collaboration so far has been an audio-visual show with British film director legend Peter Greenaway during the Berlin Film Festival of 2009.

He has performed on diverse stages over the years, including festivals such as Sónar, Pukkelpop, Lowlands, Big Chill, Sziget, ADE and venues such as Razzmatazz in Barcelona, Melkweg and Paradiso (Amsterdam). Yonderboi's music is often licensed to films, TV and fashion shows or video games, and he has scored movies, theater pieces and he has also composed music for art exhibitions like the Swiss Pavilion of the Venice Biennale 2001.

== Biography ==
=== Early years ===
Yonderboi started experimenting with music in his teenage years, and had his first release in 1998 while he was still a high-school student. The song was called Pink Solidism, which was an instrumental cover of Riders on the Storm by The Doors. Later that summer, his first five track EP, Cinnamon Kisses, came out on vinyl, and Yonderboi struck a record deal with UCMG Hungary. Some of the songs were licensed to Western European compilations.

=== Shallow And Profound ===
He recorded his first long-player right after graduation, on his own budget, which was almost US$300. This allowed 2 days in a cheap studio to record the acoustic instruments, like vibraphone, accordion, sax and vocals. Everything else like keys, synth, guitars, bass, scratches were recorded at home, and the material got produced and mixed on an average home PC. The album titled Shallow and Profound came out in 2000 and its success put Yonderboi on the international map of electronic music. He was amongst the pioneers of downtempo and trip hop, the youngest member of the movement, and the only one from the former Eastern Bloc. His music was very much in sync with the global culture of the era, yet it was distinctly different with its Eastern European charm. The album invoked and melted together the romance of several decades of the 20th century, from 30's poetry and chanson throughout 50's/60's jazz to cinematic soundtracks. As the title also suggests the record is divided into two main parts, a more vivid and playful, sometimes cartoonish first part and a rather contemplative, dreamy second part. The most successful song of the album (which came out on single as well), the vibraphone ruled Pabadam - sung by Edina Kutzora, a Hungarian singer - was widely recognized. Even Laurent Garnier announced and played it on Radio Nova, not to mention that Gilles Peterson has supported the song on BBC Radio 1 in his program Worldwide. The listeners voted the track up to position 9 in the Worldwide Winners 2000. Still today Pabadam is a frequent guest on compilations, fashion shows and radio programs. Other notable tracks are Road Movie (also available as video), Fairy Of The Lake, Pink Solidism, Ohne Chanteuse. Yonderboi also started to perform his music live, supported by his temporary band called Yonderboi Quintet. They played various festival stages, amongst many others Sónar, Lowlands, Oslo and Rotterdam Jazz Festivals and several clubs throughout Europe and Russia, like Melkweg, Supper Club, Razzmatazz, 16tons.

=== Splendid Isolation ===
Yonderboi wanted the second album to be substantially different from its predecessor both in content and on the surface. There were more resources available this time, yet his basic approach to recording remained simple, he recorded almost everything at home, from electric guitars through male vocals to cellos and brass. Only one day was spent in a proper studio, to record the children's choir for the opening track All We Go To Hell, which obviously needed a bigger space than Yonderboi's bedroom. The post-production of the material ended up surprisingly in Los Angeles, thanks to the lucky meeting with Dutch producer Tom Holkenborg, who helped Yonderboi to finish up the record. The album was named Splendid Isolation and came out in 2005. Even though it does have some Eastern European qualities, it is much more melted into Western culture than Shallow and Profound. The record has three main parts, a rather downtempo-ish beginning, then a guitar pop inspired core and a mind bending soundtrack-like closing. Two songs were copied on singles, Were You Thinking Of Me? and People Always Talk About The Weather, each had a gorgeous cinematic video directed by Yonderboi himself. Both the songs and videos got played by several stations, amongst others MTV Europe, KCRW, Studio Brussels. Several songs of the album got licensed to films, TV shows and video games, probably most often the ultra-dark and cynical Before You Snap. On the Splendid Isolation Tour Yonderboi was supported on stage by his second temporary band Kings Of Oblivion, in which Edina Kutzora sung as well. They visited many festivals all over Europe like Pukkelpop, 5 Days Off, Sziget and venues like Paradiso, Melkweg, A38 or Uebel and Gefaehrlich.

=== Passive Control ===
The goal was to create the female sequel of the quite masculine Splendid Isolation. Yonderboi found the female voice that he was looking for via Myspace, in the person of a previously unreleased young German singer, Charlotte Brandi. The recordings of the album took place in Yonderboi's home studio again. However this time only a few instruments got captured, like female vocals, acoustic guitar and a little cello. The rest of the sounds were played and programmed by Yonder, he also produced and mixed the album all by himself. His intention was to compose a rather coherent sonic universe, where the organic and the artificial creates harmony, and the border between them is almost unrecognizable. The album is difficult to place both geographically and in time, it does not really belong anywhere, however it has a strong European character. Both the soundscape and the artwork is created to be futuristic and outmoded at the same time, the album invokes the utopian art deco vibe of early 20th century, 70's folk and 90's electronic music. The new songs got already recognized and played by amongst others Jason Bentley on Morning Becomes Eclectic at KCRW. The German Vogue (magazine) reviewed the album and had Paint Hunting On The Wall on its monthly playlist at position 5.

=== Yonderboi In House ===
In 2012, Yonderboi started a remix project called Yonderboi In House, which will be released as an EP series on his own label Yonderland. Until then these tracks can be heard exclusively on his current, similarly titled live act. While creating the show Yonderboi used his DIY skills to design a matching, conceptual stage set: a glowing house frame and a Y-shaped DJ booth. So far the tour included venues like Palác Akropolis in Prague, Sziget Festival or Amsterdam dance event 2012. As a consequence he was able to cross off an important line on his childhood bucket list “tweak a real Roland TB-303 on stage”.

== Discography ==
=== Albums ===
- Shallow And Profound (2000)
- Splendid Isolation (2005)
- Passive Control (2011)

=== Singles ===
- Pabadam (2000)
- Were You Thinking of Me? (2005)
- People Always Talk About The Weather (2006)

=== EPs ===
- Cinnamon Kisses (1998)

=== Videography ===
- Road Movie (2001)
- Were You Thinking of Me? (2005)
- People Always Talk About The Weather (2006)

== In popular culture ==
- "Badly Broken Butterflies" is featured in CSI:Miami
- "People Always Talk About The Weather (Junkie XL Remix)" featured in the videogame Need for Speed: Carbon
- "Follow Me Home" featured in the videogame Test Drive Unlimited (PC version only)
- "Were You Thinking of Me?" featured in the video game by EA Sports, FIFA 08
- "Motor" (instrumental) featured in the videogame Tiger Woods PGA Tour 08

== See also ==
- DJ Krush
- DJ Shadow (sample-based music)

== Sources ==
- Review of Passive Control
- Feature on Passive Control
- Concert in St. Petersburg
- Album review of Splendid Isolation
- Yonderboi event in Prague
- Long lead of Passive Control
- Album stream - Passive Control
- Passive Control album announcement
- Review of Passive Control

=== Interviews ===
- Yonderboi interview
- Interview with Yonderboi
- BalatonSound events
- Critique on Egyenes Labirintus
- Interview regarding Passive Control
