= Mole Listening Pearls =

German record label

Mole Listening Pearls is a German record label based in Mannheim. Founded by Haluk Soyoğlu. He also came up with the concept and the idea of "Mole" and the different compilation series. Haluk was also the discoverer and namesake of De-Phazz. From 1996 till 2003 "Mole" was owned by UCMG; in 2004 Mole Listening Pearls was overtaken by Daredo Music. The name "Mole" is from the novel "Neuromancer" in which mole is a kind of computer virus (as Haluk was a fan of William Gibson, he had the idea for this type of concept and design, which he developed with the then designers Uli Ambach and Evelyn Gögele).

Since 1996 various artists of electronic music, like Alphawezen, Bassface Sascha, De-Phazz, Lemongrass, moodorama, Naomi, Wax Tailor, Barbara Lahr, Yonderboi and Zagar have been released on this label.

The first records were compilations. On "Science Jazz Vol. 1", arranged by the Zurich DJ Minus 8, you could find artists like Nightmares on Wax, LTJ Bukem and Lamb, on "Breaking The Ice" you can find, among others, Kruder & Dorfmeister and Red Snapper. From 1997 on individual artists have been signed by this label. The debut album "Detunized Gravity" (1997) by De-Phazz and Yonderboi's debut album "Shallow and Profound" were a big success, as they sold over 30 000 copies. As of August 2008, 84 albums of 31 Bands have been released. Still, various compilations will be released. These compilations act as an overview of all artists and their production on one hand, and there are a number of programmatical demands for certain music styles on the other. For instance "Batacuda" – already three follow-ups have been released between 2000 and 2007 – has afro-percussive influenced tracks, while "Science Fiction Jazz" with its eleven editions between 1996 until 2008, made a fundamental contribution to the evolution of NuJazz.

== Current active bands ==
- Alphawezen
- Anima Sound System
- De Phazz
- moodorama
- Mourah
- Yonderboi
