= The Voice Kids (Russian TV series) season 9 =

The Voice Kids
- Season 9
- Presented by: Dmitry Nagiev; Agata Muceniece
- Coaches: Basta; Polina Gagarina; Egor Kreed
- Winner: Adeliya Zagrebina
- Winning coach: Egor Kreed
- Runner-up: Sofiya Olaresko

Release
- Original network: Channel One
- Original release: 18 February – 29 April 2022

Season chronology
- ← Previous; Season 8 Next → Season 10

The ninth season of the Russian reality talent show The Voice Kids which premiered on 18 February 2022 on Channel One. Dmitry Nagiev and Agata Muceniece returned as the show's presenters. Basta and Egor Kreed returned as a coach were joined by Polina Gagarina, who returned as a coach after a one-season break and replaced LOBODA.

Adeliya Zagrebina was announced the winner on April 30, 2022, marking Egor Kreed's first win as a coach.

Basta became the Best coach of the season for the third time in a row. Polina Gagarina, as in season 7, became the second.

== Coaches and presenters ==
The Voice Kids season 9 coaches

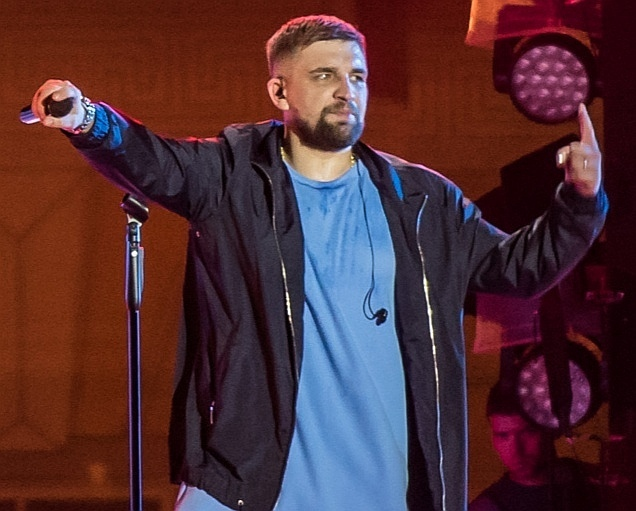
Basta

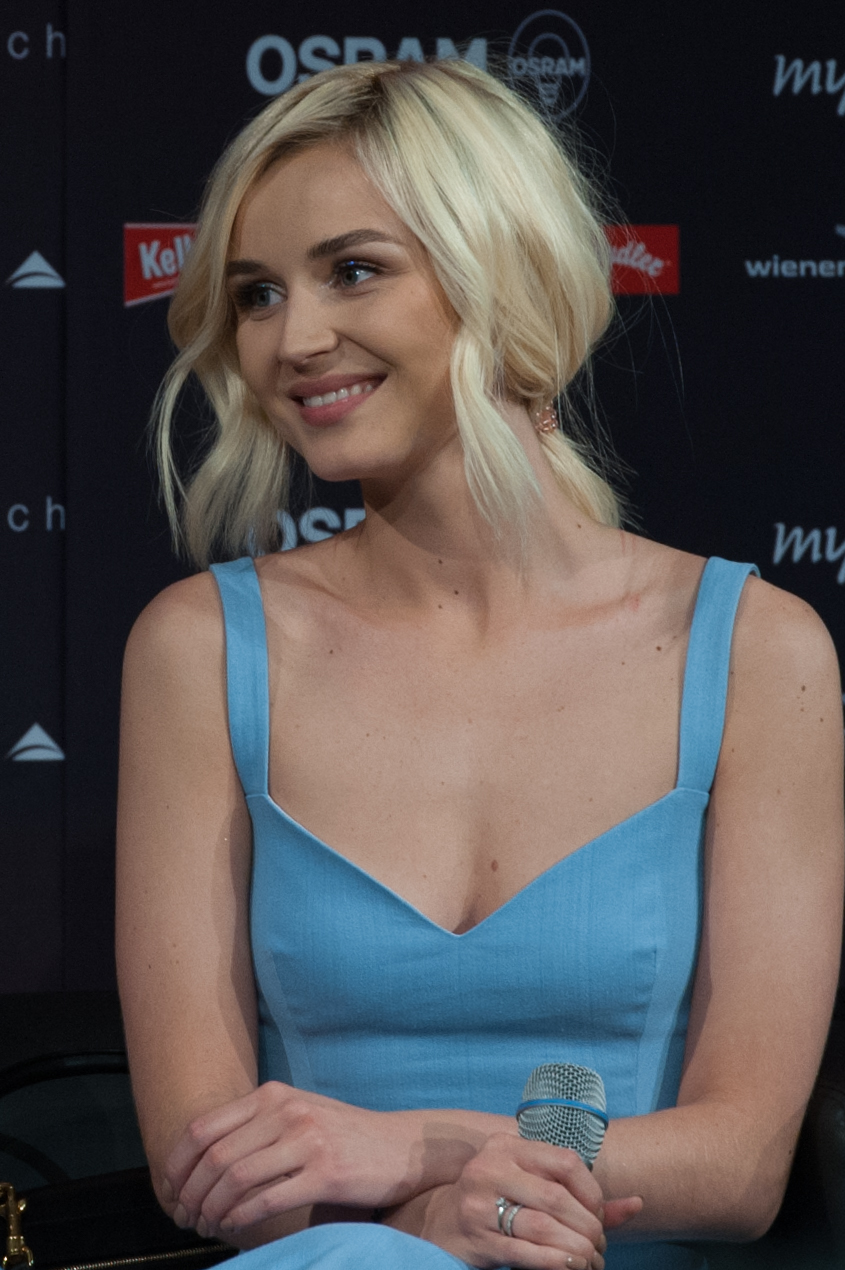
Polina Gagarina

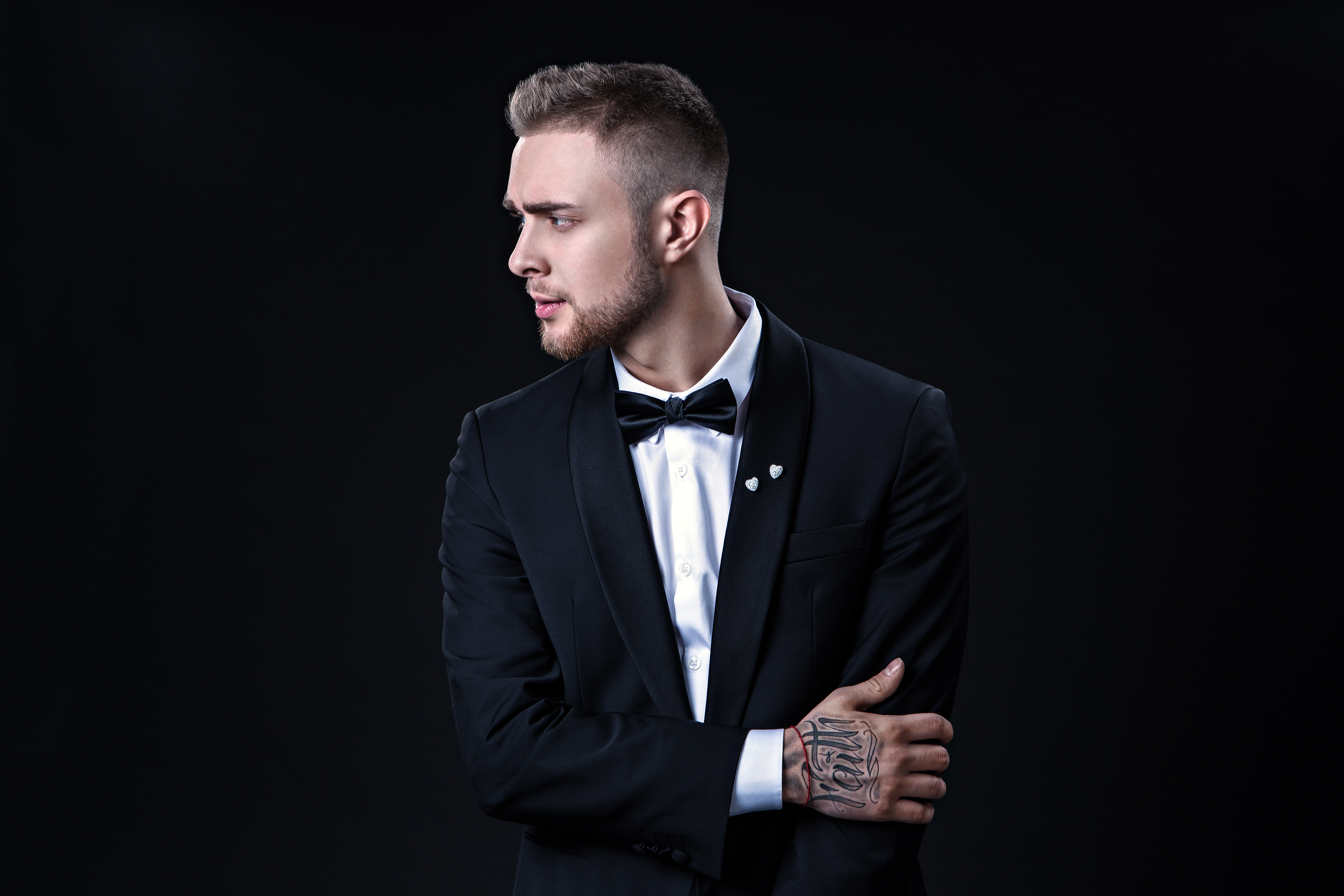
Egor Kreed

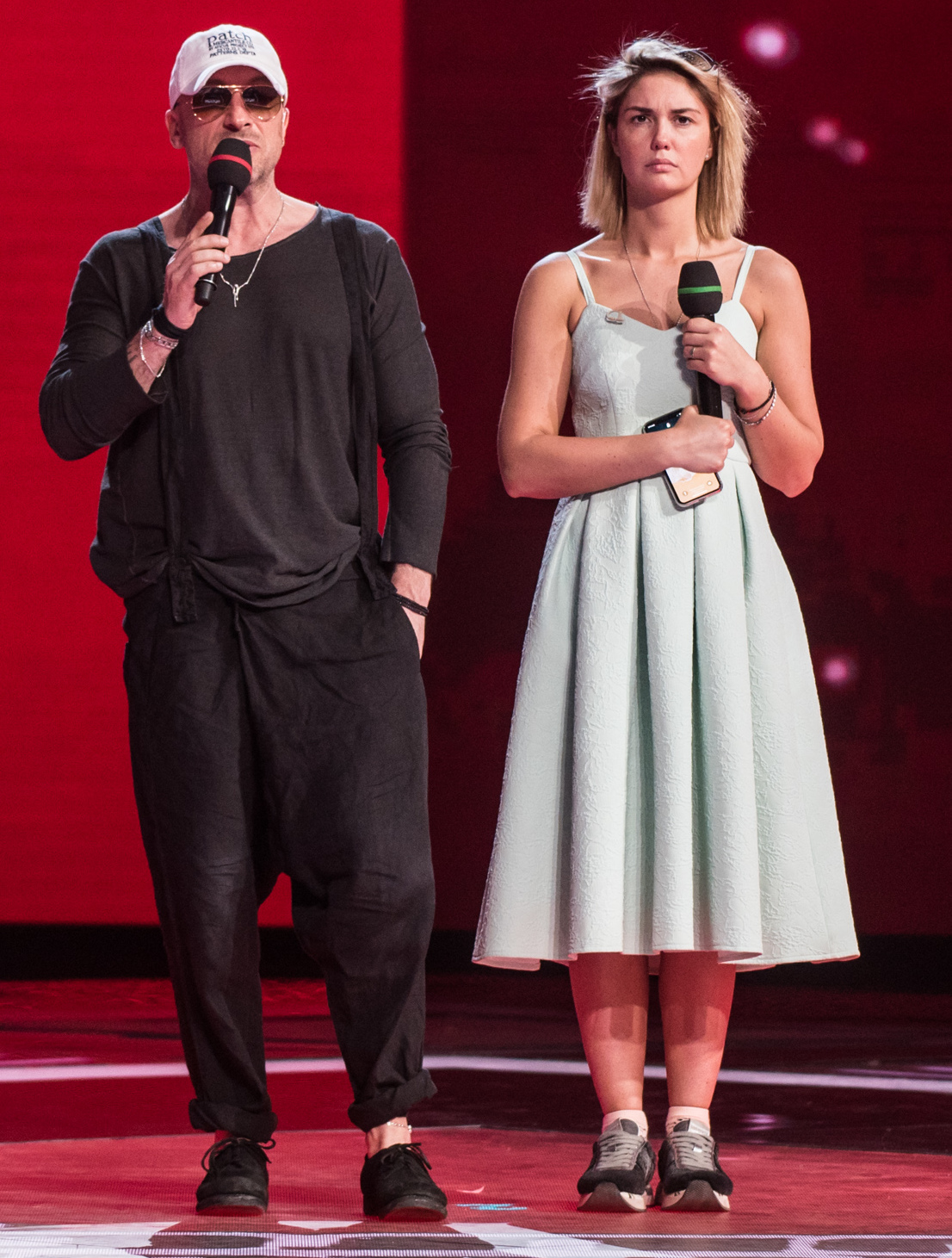
Dmitry Nagiev and Agata Muceniece

Basta and Egor Kreed returned as coaches and were joined by Polina Gagarina, who returned as a coach after a one-season break.

Dmitry Nagiev and Agata Muceniece returned as the show's presenters.

== Teams ==
Colour key

- Winner
- Runner-up
- Third place
- Eliminated in the Final
- Eliminated in the Live Extra round
- Eliminated in the Battle rounds

Coaches	Top 45 artists				
Basta					
Basta	Sofiya Olaresko	Kseniya Kann	Elisey Kasich	Anastasiya Lamberti	Eva Levchuk
Basta	David Nuridzhanyan	Mariya Gulevich	Sofiya Kirsenko	Daniil Anikin	Maya Midzuno
Basta	Polina Etchik	Vladimir Oganesyan	Vladimir Sorokin	Mariya Romanova	Miron Luzhenskiy
Polina Gagarina					
Polina Gagarina	Sagyn Omirbayuly	Malika Taygibova	Anastasiya Chumakova	Anastasiya Komarova	Nikol Koroli
Polina Gagarina	Daniil Boyko	Anisiya Nizovtseva	Anna Sukhaya	Lev Pashin	Marianna Pirumova
Polina Gagarina	Idar Kotsev	Milana Kushkhova	Adel Starostina	Stanislav Tkachyonok	Vadim Klimovich
Egor Kreed					
Egor Kreed	Adeliya Zagrebina	Shamil Ibadov	Fyodor Sorokin	Vasilisa Tsarskaya	Elizaveta Dimenina
Egor Kreed	Erik Antonyan	Ralina Ibraeva	Vladislav Gruzdov	Ulyana Petrosyan	Evanzhelika Batarshina
Egor Kreed	Timur Tyan	Alisa Vinnikova	Marta Kapelyush	Anastasiya Yachmenkina	Sofya Sokolova
Note: Italicized names are stolen contestants (who were eliminated in the Sing-offs, but were stolen in the Live Extra round and advanced to the Final).

== Blind auditions ==
Colour key

✔	Coach pressed "I WANT YOU" button
✔	Coach pressed "I WANT YOU", despite the lack places in his/her team
	Artist defaulted to a coach's team
	Artist picked a coach's team
	Artist eliminated with no coach pressing their button

Episode	Order	Artist	Age	Hometown	Song	Coach's and artist's choices		
Episode	Order	Artist	Age	Hometown	Song	Basta	Gagarina	Kreed
Episode 1 (Note: Polina Gagarina is The best coach of episode 1.) (February 18)	1	Anna Sukhaya	7	Minsk, Belarus	«Звенит январская вьюга»	—	✔	—
Episode 1 (February 18)	2	Malika Taygibova	11	Sochi, Krasnodar Krai	"Listen"	✔	✔	✔
Episode 1 (February 18)	3	Daniil Ermolaev	9	Vladimir	«Не валяй дурака, Америка!»	—	—	—
Episode 1 (February 18)	4	Evanzhelika Batarshina	13	Mauritius	"Unstoppable"	✔	✔	✔
Episode 1 (February 18)	5	Daniil Boyko	11	Moscow	"Ave Maria"	—	✔	✔
Episode 1 (February 18)	6	Sofiya Olaresko	12	Surgut, Yugra	«Эх, сапожки»	✔	—	—
Episode 1 (February 18)	7	Lev Pashin	12	Chelyabinsk	"It's a Man's World"	—	✔	—
Episode 1 (February 18)	8	Varvara Teryokhina	7	Saint Petersburg	«Папа купил автомобиль»	—	—	—
Episode 1 (February 18)	9	Vladimir Oganesyan	12	Yerevan, Armenia	"Human"	✔	—	—
Episode 2 (Note: Polina Gagarina is The best coach of episode 2.) (February 25)	1	Vadim Klimovich	10	Novomoskovsk, Tula Oblast	«Белая ночь»	✔	✔	✔
Episode 2 (February 25)	2	Sofya Sokolova	11	Saint Petersburg	"Nah Neh Nah"	—	—	✔
Episode 2 (February 25)	3	Vladislav Kovalchuk	13	Brest, Belarus	«Любимка»	—	—	—
Episode 2 (February 25)	4	Milana Kushkhova	9	Nartkala, Kabardino-Balkaria	«Гагарин, я вас любила»	✔	✔	✔
Episode 2 (February 25)	5	Emilia Katsegorova	11	Moscow	"Haunted Heart"	—	—	—
Episode 2 (February 25)	6	Vladimir Sorokin	9	Troitsk, Moscow	«Эти глаза напротив»	✔	✔	—
Episode 2 (February 25)	7	Mariya Gulevich	12	Minsk, Belarus	"What's Up?"	✔	—	—
Episode 2 (February 25)	8	Anna Ordinantseva	7	Moscow	«Весеннее танго»	—	—	—
Episode 2 (February 25)	9	Shamil Ibadov	12	Derbent, Dagestan	"Adagio"	—	—	✔
Episode 3 (Note: Basta is The best coach of episode 3.) (March 5)	1	Stanislav Tkachyonok	10	Mogilev, Belarus	«Тройка мчится, тройка скачет»	—	✔	—
Episode 3 (March 5)	2	Vasilisa Tsarskaya	9	Podolsk, Moscow Oblast	"What About Us"	—	—	✔
Episode 3 (March 5)	3	Vladislav Gruzdov	13	Borisov, Belarus	«Салют, Вера!»	✔	✔	✔
Episode 3 (March 5)	4	Sofya Odikadze	13	Bataysk, Rostov Oblast	"Cheek to Cheek"	—	—	—
Episode 3 (March 5)	5	Adeliya Zagrebina	8	Nizhny Novgorod	"Rolling in the Deep"	✔	✔	✔
Episode 3 (March 5)	6	Konstantin Rusanovsky	8	Moscow	«Генералы песчаных карьеров»	—	—	—
Episode 3 (March 5)	7	Anastasiya Lamberti	14	Moscow	"Anyone"	✔	✔	✔
Episode 3 (March 5)	8	Marta Kapelyush	11	Moscow	«Оставь меня одну»	—	—	✔
Episode 3 (March 5)	9	David Nuridzhanyan	14	Podolsk, Moscow Oblast	"Historia de un amor"	✔	—	—
Episode 4 (Note: Basta is The best coach of episode 4.) (March 8)	1	Ralina Ibraeva	10	Kazan	«Лучшая»	―	―	✔
Episode 4 (March 8)	2	Ksenia Kann	13	Moscow	«Je t’aime»	✔	✔	✔
Episode 4 (March 8)	3	Akim Akbergenov	9	Moscow	«Шёл казак на побывку домой»	―	―	―
Episode 4 (March 8)	4	Nikol Koroli	14	Moscow	“Rise like a Phoenix”	✔	✔	✔
Episode 4 (March 8)	5	Idar Kotsev	10	Nalchik	"Aria of Nemorino from the opera L'elisir d'amore"	―	✔	―
Episode 4 (March 8)	6	Timofey Ratner	10	Chelyabinsk	"Isn't She Lovely"	―	―	―
Episode 4 (March 8)	7	Alisa Marinkevich	8	Moscow	«Мир без любимого»	―	―	―
Episode 4 (March 8)	8	Daniil Anikin	12	Moscow	«Летний дождь»	✔	✔	✔
Episode 4 (March 8)	9	Alisa Vinnikova	10	Podolsk, Moscow Oblast	«Something's Got a Hold on Me»	―	―	✔
Episode 5 (Note: Basta is The best coach of episode 5.) (March 11)	1	Anastasiya Chumakova	9	Kineshma, Ivanovo Oblast	«Оставайся, мальчик, с нами»	―	✔	―
Episode 5 (March 11)	2	Sagyn Omirbayuly	11	Shymkent, Kazakhstan	«Скажите, девушки, подружке вашей»	✔	✔	―
Episode 5 (March 11)	3	Sofiya Knysh	9	Saint Petersburg	"I Want to Break Free"	―	―	―
Episode 5 (March 11)	4	Elisey Kasich	12	Minsk, Belarus	«Целый свет со мной» / "You Raise Me Up"	✔	✔	✔
Episode 5 (March 11)	5	Polina Etchik	12	Moscow	"Kings & Queens"	✔	―	―
Episode 5 (March 11)	6	Andrey Borisov	11	Moscow	«Ты далеко»	―	―	―
Episode 5 (March 11)	7	Ulyana Petrosyan	10	Sochi, Krasnodar Krai	"Counting Stars"	✔	✔	✔
Episode 5 (March 11)	8	Valeriya Shevchenko	9	Moscow	«Бегу к тебе»	―	―	―
Episode 5 (March 11)	9	Erik Antonyan	15	London, United Kingdom	"Someone You Loved"	―	―	✔
Episode 6 (Note: Basta is The best coach of episode 6.) (March 18)	1	Marianna Pirumova	10	Moscow	«All of Me»	✔	✔	✔
Episode 6 (March 18)	2	Fyodor Sorokin	11	Moscow	«Беспечный ангел»	—	—	✔
Episode 6 (March 18)	3	Mikhail Zotov	10	Chelyabinsk	«Будет светло»	—	—	—
Episode 6 (March 18)	4	Dinara Bultakova	10	Borovsky, Tyumen Oblast	«Песня царевны Забавы»	—	—	—
Episode 6 (March 18)	5	Eva Levchuk	14	Moscow	«Apres moi»	✔	✔	✔
Episode 6 (March 18)	6	Mariya Romanova	8	Moscow	History Repeating	✔	—	—
Episode 6 (March 18)	7	Ivan Baskov	11	Moscow	«Танго «Магнолия»»	—	—	—
Episode 6 (March 18)	8	Sofiya Kirsenko	13	Simferopol, Ukraine	«Ой, у вишневому саду»	✔	—	—
Episode 6 (March 18)	9	Elizaveta Dimenina	12	Novosibirsk	"Blinding Lights"	—	—	✔
Episode 7 (Note: Basta is The best coach of episode 7.) (March 25)	1	Maya Midzuno	13	Khabarovsk	«У моря, у синего моря»	✔	—	—
Episode 7 (March 25)	2	Eldar Tazetdinov	8	Kazan	«Молодёжная»	—	—	—
Episode 7 (March 25)	3	Anisiya Nizovtseva	10	Samara	«Listen to Your Heart»	✔	✔	—
Episode 7 (March 25)	4	Timur Tyan	14	Kyzylorda, Kazakhstan	«Как молоды мы были»	—	—	✔
Episode 7 (March 25)	5	Adel Starostina	7	Moscow	«Queen of the Night»	—	✔	—
Episode 7 (March 25)	6	Anastasiya Komarova	10	Moscow	«Мыслепад»	✔	✔	✔
Episode 7 (March 25)	7	Adriana Lozado-Ustinova	11	Maryland, United States	«Выше облаков»	—	Team full	—
Episode 7 (March 25)	8	Miron Luzhenskiy	8	Grebnevo, Moscow oblast	«I Can't Dance»	✔	Team full	—
Episode 7 (March 25)	9	Mariya Molkova	13	Kazan	«Три белых коня»	Team full	Team full	—
Episode 7 (March 25)	10	Anastasiya Yachmenkina	12	Riga, Latvia	«My All»	Team full	Team full	✔

== The Battles ==
The Battles start on April 1, 2022. Contestants who won their battle advanced to the Sing-off rounds.

Colour key

Artist won the Battle and advanced to the Sing-offs
Artist was eliminated

Episode	Coach	Order	Winner	Song	Losers	
Episode 8 (April 1)	Polina Gagarina	1	Anastasiya Chumakova	«Mickey»	Anna Sukhaya	Adel Starostina
Episode 8 (April 1)	Polina Gagarina	2	Nikol Koroli	«Мечтатели»	Vadim Klimovich	Marianna Pirumova
Episode 8 (April 1)	Polina Gagarina	3	Anastasiya Komarova	«Ты горишь, как огонь»	Lev Pashin	Stanislav Tkachyonok
Episode 8 (April 1)	Polina Gagarina	4	Malika Taygibova	«Вою на луну» / «Порушка-Параня»	Milana Kushkhova	Anisiya Nizovtseva
Episode 8 (April 1)	Polina Gagarina	5	Sagyn Omirbayuly	«Luna»	Daniil Boyko	Idar Kotsev
Episode 9 (April 8)	Basta	1	Anastasiya Lamberti	«Парабола»	Maya Midzuno	Miron Luzhenskiy
Episode 9 (April 8)	Basta	2	Sofiya Olaresko	«Видели ночь»	Vladimir Sorokin	Sofiya Kirsenko
Episode 9 (April 8)	Basta	3	Kseniya Kann	«Только»	David Nuridzhanyan	Polina Etchik
Episode 9 (April 8)	Basta	4	Eva Levchuk	«Time After Time»	Daniil Anikin	Mariya Romanova
Episode 9 (April 8)	Basta	5	Elisey Kasich	«I Still Haven't Found What I'm Looking For»	Vladimir Oganesyan	Mariya Gulevich
Episode 10 (April 15)	Egor Kreed	1	Elizaveta Dimenina	«Sk8er Boy»	Evanzhelika Batarshina	Sofya Sokolova
Episode 10 (April 15)	Egor Kreed	2	Fyodor Sorokin	«Берегу»	Vladislav Gruzdov	Marta Kapelyush
Episode 10 (April 15)	Egor Kreed	3	Shamil Ibadov	«Lonely»	Erik Antonyan	Timur Tyan
Episode 10 (April 15)	Egor Kreed	4	Adeliya Zagrebina	«Ghostbusters» / «Bad	Ralina Ibraeva	Alisa Vinnikova
Episode 10 (April 15)	Egor Kreed	5	Vasilisa Tsarskaya	«30 минут» / «Отпускаю»	Ulyana Petrosyan	Anastasiya Yachmenkina

== The Sing-offs ==
The Sing-offs started on April 1. Contestants who was saved by their coaches advanced to the Final.

Colour key

Artist was saved by his/her coach and advanced to the Final
Artist was eliminated but received the Comeback and advanced to the Live Playoffs

Episode	Coach	Order	Artist	Song	Result
Episode 8 (April 1)	Polina Gagarina	1	Anastasia Chumakova	«Оставайся, мальчик, с нами...»	Received the Comeback
Episode 8 (April 1)	Polina Gagarina	2	Nikol Koroli	«Rise Like a Phoenix»	Received the Comeback
Episode 8 (April 1)	Polina Gagarina	3	Anastasia Komarova	«Мыслепад»	Received the Comeback
Episode 8 (April 1)	Polina Gagarina	4	Malika Taygibova	«Listen»	Advanced
Episode 8 (April 1)	Polina Gagarina	5	Sagyn Omirbayuly	«Скажите, девушки, подружке вашей»	Advanced
Episode 9 (April 8)	Basta	1	Anastasia Lamberti	«Anyone»	Received the Comeback
Episode 9 (April 8)	Basta	2	Sofia Olaresko	«Эх, сапожки»	Received the Comeback
Episode 9 (April 8)	Basta	3	Ksenia Kann	«Je t’aime»	Advanced
Episode 9 (April 8)	Basta	4	Eva Levchuk	«Apres moi»	Received the Comeback
Episode 9 (April 8)	Basta	5	Elisey Kasich	«Целый свет со мной» / «You Raise Me Up»	Advanced
Episode 10 (April 15)	Egor Kreed	1	Elizaveta Dimenina	«Blinding Lights»	Received the Comeback
Episode 10 (April 15)	Egor Kreed	2	Fedor Sorokin	«Беспечный ангел»	Received the Comeback
Episode 10 (April 15)	Egor Kreed	3	Shamil Ibadov	«Adagio»	Advanced
Episode 10 (April 15)	Egor Kreed	4	Adeliya Zagrebina	«Rolling in the Deep»	Advanced
Episode 10 (April 15)	Egor Kreed	5	Vasilisa Tsarskaya	«What About Us»	Received the Comeback

== Live shows ==
Colour key

Artist was saved by the Public's votes
Artist was eliminated

=== Week 1: Live Extra round (April 22) ===
As with season 2, each coach saved three artists who were eliminated in the Sing-offs. Playoff results were voted on in real time. Nine artists sang live and six of them were eliminated by the end of the night. Three saved artists advanced to the Final.

Episode	Coach	Order	Artist	Song	Public's vote	Result
Episode 11 (April 22) (Note: Basta is The best coach of episode 11.)	Basta	1	Sofiya Olaresko	«Барыня» / «Diamonds»	49,4%	Advanced
Episode 11 (April 22)	Basta	2	Anastasiya Lamberti	«Grande amore»	18,8%	Eliminated
Episode 11 (April 22)	Basta	3	Eva Levchuk	«Easy on Me»	31,8%	Eliminated
Episode 11 (April 22)	Polina Gagarina	4	Anastasiya Chumakova	«Маэстро»	44,5%	Advanced
Episode 11 (April 22)	Polina Gagarina	5	Anastasiya Komarova	«Wrecking Ball»	27,8%	Eliminated
Episode 11 (April 22)	Polina Gagarina	6	Nikol Koroli	«Любовь, похожая на сон»	27,7%	Eliminated
Episode 11 (April 22)	Egor Kreed	7	Elizaveta Dimenina	«Облетают последние маки»	9,1%	Eliminated
Episode 11 (April 22)	Egor Kreed	8	Fyodor Sorokin	«Констанция»	71,4%	Advanced
Episode 11 (April 22)	Egor Kreed	9	Vasilisa Tsarskaya	«Ты на свете есть»	19,5%	Eliminated

=== Week 2: Final (April 29) ===
Episode	Coach	Order	Artist	Song	Public's vote	Result
Episode 12 (April 29)
Episode 12 (April 29)	Final					
Episode 12 (April 29)	Polina Gagarina	1	Anastasiya Chumakova	"Ленинградский рок-н-ролл"	20,8%	Eliminated
Episode 12 (April 29)	Polina Gagarina	2	Malika Taygibova	"Chandelier"	29,8%	Eliminated
Episode 12 (April 29)	Polina Gagarina	3	Sagyn Omirbayuly	"Очи чёрные"	49,4%	Advanced
Episode 12 (April 29)	Basta	4	Sofiya Olaresko	"Улетай на крыльях ветра"	41,3%	Advanced
Episode 12 (April 29)	Basta	5	Kseniya Kann	"Я тебя рисую"	23%	Eliminated
Episode 12 (April 29)	Basta	6	Elisey Kasich	"Беловежская пуща"	35,7%	Eliminated
Episode 12 (April 29)	Egor Kreed	7	Shamil Ibadov	"Арабская ночь"	13%	Eliminated
Episode 12 (April 29)	Egor Kreed	8	Adeliya Zagrebina	"Прости за любовь" / "Hurt"	44,3%	Advanced
Episode 12 (April 29)	Egor Kreed	9	Fyodor Sorokin	"Lune"	42,7%	Eliminated
Episode 12 (April 29)	Super Final					
Episode 12 (April 29)	Polina Gagarina	1	Sagyn Omirbayuly	"Единственная"	27,2%	Third place
Episode 12 (April 29)	Basta	2	Sofiya Olaresko	"По Дону гуляет"	32,3%	Runner-up
Episode 12 (April 29)	Egor Kreed	3	Adeliya Zagrebina	"Мама"	40,6%	Winner

Non-competition performances
Performer	Song
The Top 9 artists	"The Winner Takes It All"

== Best Coach ==
Colour key

- Best Coach
- Second place
- Third place
- Episode's Best Coach

Coach	Public's vote _{(per episode)}									Result
Coach	#1	#2	#3	#4	#5	#6	#7	#11	Av.	Result
Basta	38%	39%	40%	43%	46%	50%	49%	38%	42%	Best Coach
Polina Gagarina	39%	43%	38%	40%	38%	32%	33%	29%	37%	Second place
Egor Kreed	23%	18%	22%	17%	16%	18%	18%	33%	21%	Third place
