= The Voice Kids (Russian TV series) season 8 =

The Voice Kids
- Season 8
- Presented by: Dmitry Nagiev; Agata Muceniece
- Coaches: Basta; LOBODA; Egor Kreed
- Winner: Vladislav Tyukin
- Winning coach: LOBODA
- Runner-up: Elizaveta Trofimova

Release
- Original network: Channel One
- Original release: February 12 – April 30, 2021

Season chronology
- ← Previous; Season 7 Next → Season 9

The eighth season of the Russian reality talent show The Voice Kids premiered on 12 February 2021 on Channel One. Dmitry Nagiev and Agata Muceniece returned as the show's presenters. Basta returned as a coach, LOBODA returned as a coach after a one-season break and replaced Polina Gagarina, Egor Kreed replaced Valery Meladze and became a new coach for the show.

Vladislav Tyukin was announced the winner on April 30, 2021, marking LOBODA's first win as the coach and the second female coach to win in the show's history behind Pelageya.

Basta became the Best coach of the season for the second time in a row, LOBODA, as in season 6, became third.

== Coaches and presenters ==
The Voice Kids season 8 coaches

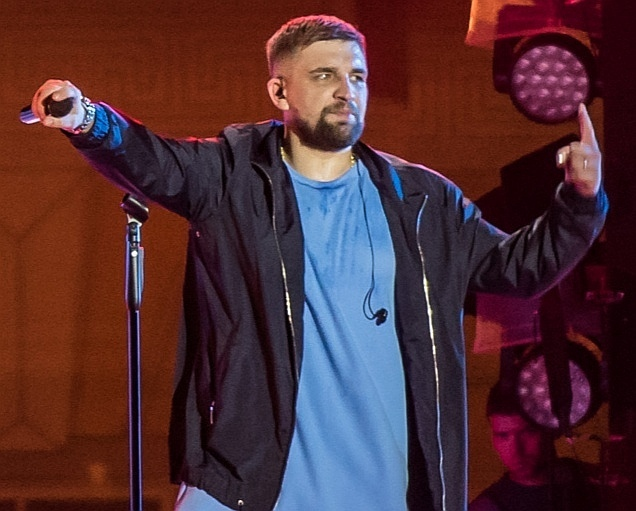
Basta

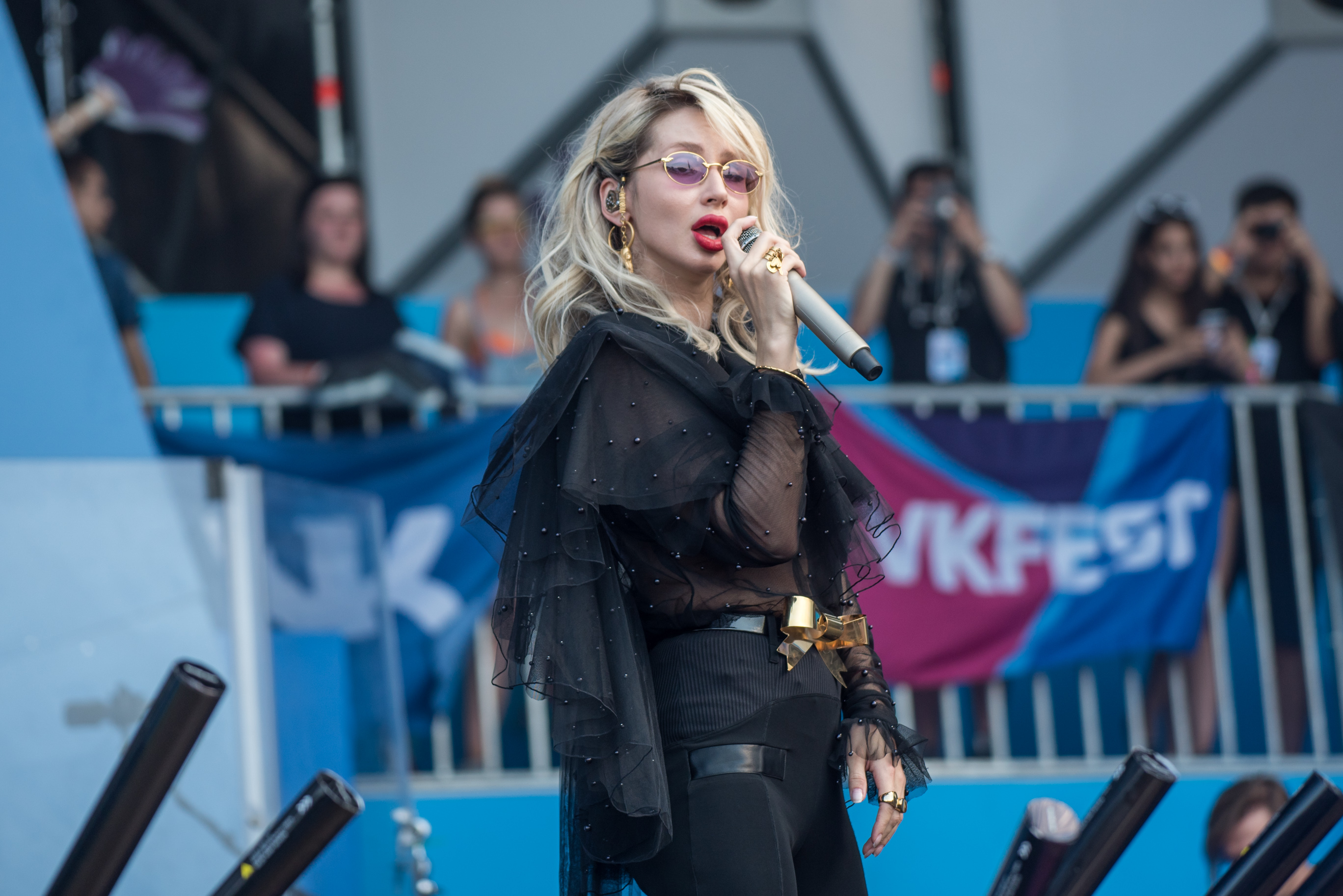
LOBODA

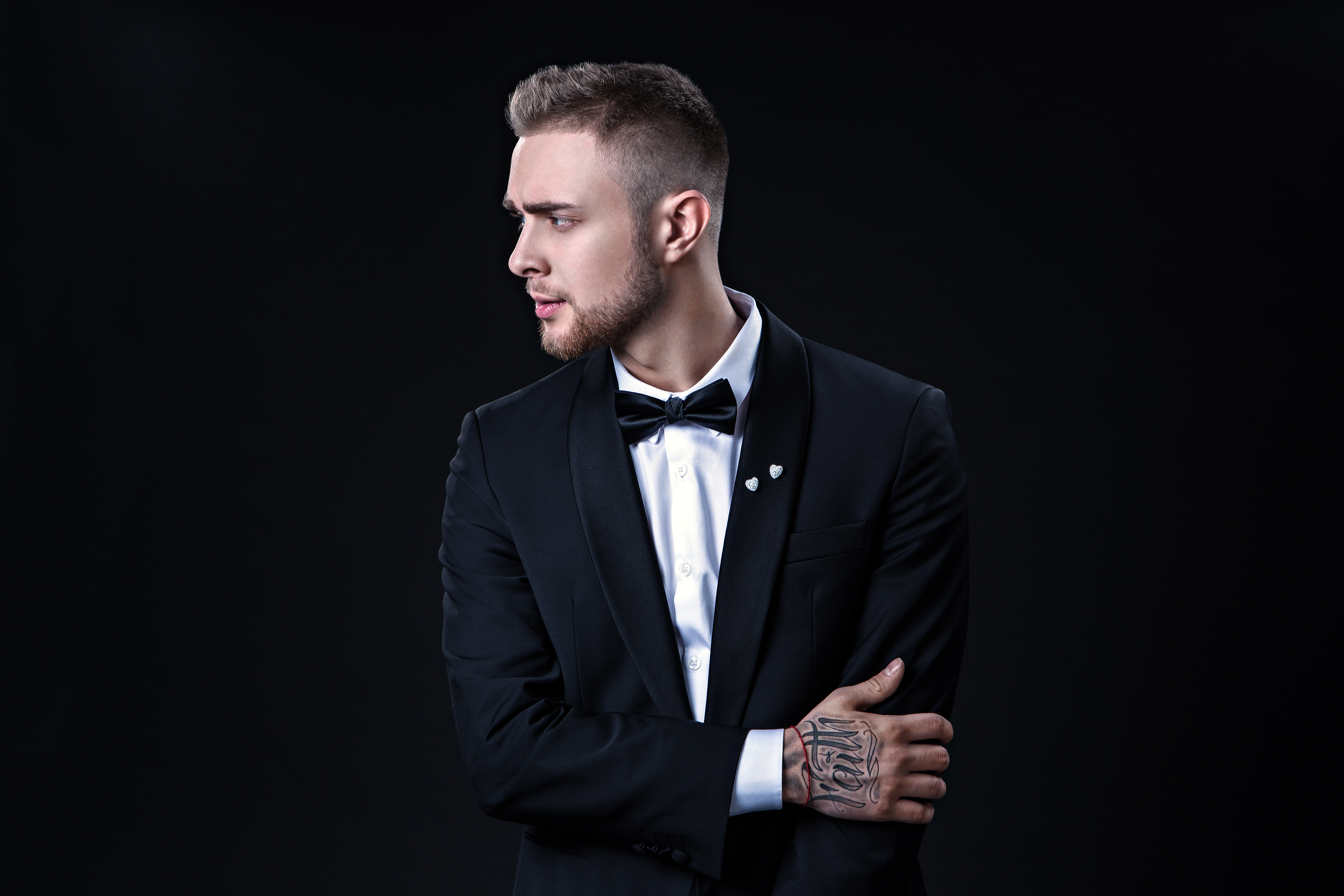
Egor Kreed

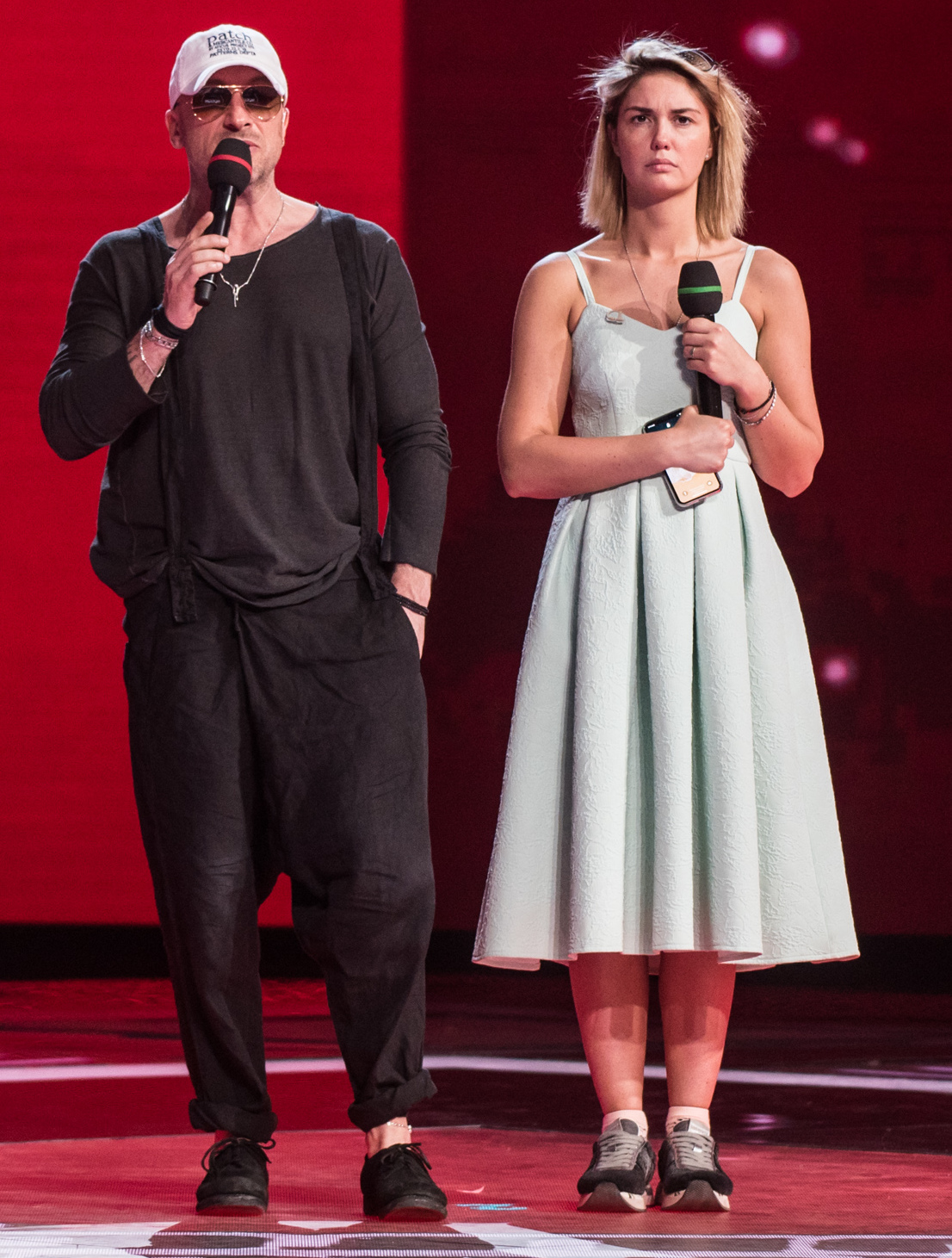
Dmitry Nagiev and Agata Muceniece

There were two changes to the coaching panel. Basta was joined by LOBODA, who returned after a one-season break and Egor Kreed as a new coach.

Dmitry Nagiev and Agata Muceniece returned as the show's presenters.

== Teams ==
Colour key

- Winner
- Runner-up
- Third place
- Eliminated in the Final
- Eliminated in the Live Extra round
- Eliminated in the Battle rounds

Coaches	Top 45 artists				
Basta					
Basta	Mariya Politikova	Kira Gogoladze	Timofey Zavalinich	Vasilisa Suyunova	Polina Danilchenko
Basta	Polina Li	Gabriel Aleksandrov	Ay-Herel Shuluu	Arina Milenko	Valeriya Bochenkova
Basta	Ekaterina Tabarina	Diana Vakhiba	Denis Kucher	Elizaveta Khenkina	Anna Yurkevich
LOBODA					
LOBODA	Vladislav Tyukin	Sofiya Fanta	Yuliya Gavrilova	Miron Provorov	Kseniya Kovalenko
LOBODA	Makar Smyslov	Vasilisa Grushevskaya	Anna Kachurovskaya	Elizaveta Rogozina	Andrey Averin
LOBODA	Polina Syutkina	Yalky Saka	Milana Kompanichenko	Safina Shafigulina	Varvara Butko
Egor Kreed					
Egor Kreed	Elizaveta Trofimova	Alisa Trifonova	Anna Volkova	Georgiy Dzeboev	Sofiya Medvedeva
Egor Kreed	Arseniy Slesarev	Evgeniya Gaydova	Pyotr Zatolochny	Daniel Golyana	Margarita Bavskaya
Egor Kreed	Eva Poklonskaya	Eva Temnyuk	Taisiya Khabibullina	Kirill Tomilin	Stanislav Kashevarov
Note: Italicized names are stolen contestants (who were eliminated in the Sing-offs, but were stolen in the Live Extra round and advanced to the Final).

== Blind auditions ==
Colour key

✔	Coach pressed "I WANT YOU" button
✔	Coach pressed "I WANT YOU", despite the lack places in his/her team
	Artist defaulted to a coach's team
	Artist picked a coach's team
	Artist eliminated with no coach pressing their button

Episode	Order	Artist	Age	Hometown	Song	Coach's and artist's choices		
Episode	Order	Artist	Age	Hometown	Song	Basta	LOBODA	Kreed
Episode 1 (Note: Basta is The best coach of episode 1.) (February 12)	1	Miron Provorov	7	Rybinsk, Yaroslavl Oblast	"Батарейка" / "F-R-I-E-N-D-S"	✔	✔	✔
Episode 1 (February 12)	2	Alisa Trifonova	12	Moscow	"Shallow"	✔	✔	✔
Episode 1 (February 12)	3	Elizaveta Khenkina	10	Kaluga	"Evil Gal Blues"	✔	✔	—
Episode 1 (February 12)	4	Maksim Tolkachyov	10	Moscow	"Прятки"	—	—	—
Episode 1 (February 12)	5	Milana Kompanichenko	15	Lobnya, Moscow Oblast	"Idontwannabeyouanymore"	✔	✔	—
Episode 1 (February 12)	6	Alisa Shcherban	7	Moscow	"Tutti Frutti"	—	—	—
Episode 1 (February 12)	7	Makar Smyslov	11	Ivanovo	"Львиное сердце"	✔	✔	✔
Episode 1 (February 12)	8	Sofiya Fanta	13	Ramenskoye, Moscow Oblast	"Run to You"	—	✔	—
Episode 1 (February 12)	9	Polina Danilchenko	8	Moscow	"Bim bam toi"	✔	—	—
Episode 1 (February 12)	10	Fyodor Shpagin	13	Arzamas, Nizhy Novgorod Oblast	"Я не умею танцевать"	—	—	—
Episode 1 (February 12)	11	Taisiya Khabibullina	10	Surgut, Yugra	«Broken Vow»	—	—	✔
Episode 2 (Note: Basta is The best coach of episode 2.) (February 20)	1	Mariya Politikova	13	Ryazan	«Реченька»	✔	✔	✔
Episode 2 (February 20)	2	Andrey Averin	8	Saint-Petersburg	«Les Temps des Cathedrales»	✔	✔	✔
Episode 2 (February 20)	3	Arina Milenko	14	Chelyabinsk	«Sing, sing, sing»	✔	—	✔
Episode 2 (February 20)	4	Fyodor Uvarov	14	Moscow	«Поздний вечер в Сорренто»	—	—	—
Episode 2 (February 20)	5	Anna Volkova	8	Moscow	«My Heart Will Go On»	—	—	✔
Episode 2 (February 20)	6	Vasilisa Kozhemyakina	9	Moscow	«L-O-V-E»	—	—	—
Episode 2 (February 20)	7	Georgiy Dzeboev	13	Vladivostok	«УВЛИУВТ»	✔	—	✔
Episode 2 (February 20)	8	Vasilisa Grushevskaya	12	Moscow	«Creep»	✔	✔	✔
Episode 2 (February 20)	9	Diana Vakhiba	11	Hurghada, Egypt	«Into the Unknown»	✔	—	—
Episode 3 (Note: Basta is The best coach of episode 3.) (February 26)	1	Arseniy Slesarev	13	Moscow	«A Little Less Conversation»	—	—	✔
Episode 3 (February 26)	2	Yuliya Gavrilova	13	Kinel-Cherkassy, Samara Oblast	«Ай вы, цыгане»	✔	✔	✔
Episode 3 (February 26)	3	Sofiya Kameneva	8	Ryazan	«Канатоходка»	—	—	—
Episode 3 (February 26)	4	Timofey Zavalinich	11	Novorossiysk, Krasnodar Krai	«Беспечный ангел»	✔	—	✔
Episode 3 (February 26)	5	Polina Syutkina	8	Tyumen	«What About Us?»	✔	✔	✔
Episode 3 (February 26)	6	Egor Sviridov	6	Ekaterinburg	«Ничего на свете лучше нету»	—	—	—
Episode 3 (February 26)	7	Evgeniya Gaydova	15	Kondrovo, Kaluga Oblast	«A Song for You»	✔	✔	✔
Episode 3 (February 26)	8	Kseniya Galetskaya	13	Minsk, Belarus	«Драмы больше нет»	—	—	—
Episode 3 (February 26)	9	Polina Li	14	Saint-Petersburg	«Underneath Your Clothes»	✔	—	—
Episode 4 (Note: Basta is The best coach of episode 4.) (March 5)	1	Margarita Bavskaya	8	Novosibirsk	«Ангелы в танце»	✔	✔	✔
Episode 4 (March 5)	2	Nikita Salov	14	Saint-Petersburg	«Розпрягайте, хлопці, коні»	—	—	—
Episode 4 (March 5)	3	Pyotr Zatolochny	7	Saint-Petersburg	«Don't Worry, Be Happy»	✔	—	✔
Episode 4 (March 5)	4	Elizaveta Trofimova	12	Moscow	"Overjoyed"	✔	✔	✔
Episode 4 (March 5)	5	Diana Tikhomirova	7	Saint-Petersburg	«Эй, вы, там, наверху!»	—	—	—
Episode 4 (March 5)	6	Denis Kucher	14	Evpatoria, Ukraine	«Ты так красива»	✔	—	—
Episode 4 (March 5)	7	Ekaterina Tabarina	12	Nur-Sultan, Kazakhstan	«Проснись и пой»	✔	—	—
Episode 4 (March 5)	8	Daria Hanke	11	Lappeenranta, Finland	«Crazy»	—	—	—
Episode 4 (March 5)	9	Anna Kachurovskaya	13	Moscow	«Basin Street Blues»	✔	✔	—
Episode 5 (Note: Basta is The best coach of episode 5.) (March 12)	1	Ay-Kherel Shuluu	12	Bulun-Bazhy, Tyva	«Billie Jean»	✔	✔	✔
Episode 5 (March 12)	2	Marianna Gekman	9	Krasnoznamensk, Moscow Oblast	«Белая река»	—	—	—
Episode 5 (March 12)	3	Anna Yurkevich	11	Minsk, Belarus	«Survivor»	✔	✔	✔
Episode 5 (March 12)	4	Daniel Golyana	8	Saint-Petersburg	«Моя маленькая бейба»	—	—	✔
Episode 5 (March 12)	5	Eva Temnyuk	13	Podolsk, Moscow Oblast	"Me voy"	✔	—	✔
Episode 5 (March 12)	6	Vasilisa Suyunova	14	Troitsk, Moscow	«Toy»	✔	✔	✔
Episode 5 (March 12)	7	Vyshan Kazachenko	12	Krasnoyarsk	«Georgia On My Mind»	—	—	—
Episode 5 (March 12)	8	Amina Gasymova	10	Moscow	«Вальс-бостон»	—	—	—
Episode 5 (March 12)	9	Kseniya Kovalenko	9	Novosibirsk	«Route 66»	—	✔	—
Episode 6 (Note: Basta is The best coach of episode 6.) (March 19)	1	Safina Shafigulina	7	Samara	«Опять метель»	—	✔	—
Episode 6 (March 19)	2	Filipp Litvinov †	13	Moscow	«Johnny B. Goode»	—	—	—
Episode 6 (March 19)	3	Eva Poklonskaya	14	Novorossiysk, Krasnodar Krai	"It's a Man's World"	✔	✔	✔
Episode 6 (March 19)	4	Kirill Tomilin	9	Moscow	«Царевна»	✔	—	✔
Episode 6 (March 19)	5	Yalky Saka	13	Antalya, Turkey	«I Have Nothing»	✔	✔	✔
Episode 6 (March 19)	6	Stefaniya Rostovtseva	7	Moscow	«Pardonne-moi ce caprice d'enfant»	—	—	—
Episode 6 (March 19)	7	Elena Chesnokova	14	Podolsk, Moscow Oblast	«Белым снегом»	—	—	—
Episode 6 (March 19)	8	Vladislav Tyukin	12	Saint-Petersburg	«Feelings»	—	✔	—
Episode 6 (March 19)	9	Kira Gogoladze	14	Vladimir	«Contigo en la Distancia»	✔	—	—
Episode 7 (Note: Basta is The best coach of episode 7.) (March 27)	1	Gabriel Aleksandrov	12	Moscow	«Historia de un Amor»	✔	✔	—
Episode 7 (March 27)	2	Elizaveta Rogozina	10	Zvenigorod, Moscow Oblast	«В городе моём»	✔	✔	✔
Episode 7 (March 27)	3	Elina Nigmatullina	8	Kazan	«Пой, гармошка, веселей»	—	—	—
Episode 7 (March 27)	4	Sofiya Medvedeva	11	Moscow	«If I Ain't Got You»	✔	✔	✔
Episode 7 (March 27)	5	Timur Ushakov	13	Kaluga	«I Wish / «Never Say Never»	—	—	—
Episode 7 (March 27)	6	Valeriya Bochenkova	6	Saint-Petersburg	«Roar»	✔	—	—
Episode 7 (March 27)	7	Alisa Semivolos	10	Novorossiysk, Krasnodar Krai	«Паруса»	Team full	—	—
Episode 7 (March 27)	8	Stanislav Kashevarov	10	Engels, Saratov Oblast	«L'Italiano	Team full	✔	✔
Episode 7 (March 27)	9	Varvara Butko	12	Moscow	«How Deep Is Your Love»	Team full	✔	Team full

== The Battles ==
The Battles start on April 2, 2021. Contestants who won their battle advanced to the Sing-off rounds.

Colour key

Artist won the Battle and advanced to the Sing-offs
Artist was eliminated

Episode	Coach	Order	Winner	Song	Losers	
Episode 8 (April 2)	Basta	1	Polina Danilchenko	«Pretty Fly (for a White Guy)»	Valeriya Bochenkova	Anna Yurkevich
Episode 8 (April 2)	Basta	2	Mariya Politikova	«Метелица»	Polina Li	Ekaterina Tabarina
Episode 8 (April 2)	Basta	3	Timofey Zavalinich	«Blinding Lights»	Ay-Kherel Shuluu	Denis Kucher
Episode 8 (April 2)	Basta	4	Kira Gogoladze	«Ой, у вишневому саду»	Gabriel Alexandrov	Diana Vakhiba
Episode 8 (April 2)	Basta	5	Vasilisa Suyunova	«Sinner Man»	Arina Milenko	Elizaveta Khenkina
Episode 9 (April 9)	LOBODA	1	Sofiya Fanta	«My Kind of Love»	Yalky Saka	Vasilisa Grushevskaya
Episode 9 (April 9)	LOBODA	2	Miron Provorov	«Почему?»	Elizaveta Rogozina	Safina Shafigulina
Episode 9 (April 9)	LOBODA	3	Yuliya Gavrilova	«Dusk till Dawn» / «Со вечора, с полуночи»	Anna Kachurovskaya	Milana Kompanichenko
Episode 9 (April 9)	LOBODA	4	Vladislav Tyukin	«Озеро надежды»	Makar Smyslov	Polina Syutkina
Episode 9 (April 9)	LOBODA	5	Kseniya Kovalenko	«Dancing Queen»	Varvara Butko	Andrey Averin
Episode 10 (April 16)	Egor Kreed	1	Anna Volkova	«Психушка»	Taisiya Khabibullina	Pyotr Zatolochny
Episode 10 (April 16)	Egor Kreed	2	Sofiya Medvedeva	«Детство»	Margarita Bavskaya	Stanislav Kashevarov
Episode 10 (April 16)	Egor Kreed	3	Elizaveta Trofimova	«Call Me Maybe»	Arseniy Slesaryov	Eva Poklonskaya
Episode 10 (April 16)	Egor Kreed	4	Georgiy Dzeboev	«2 типа людей»	Daniel Golyana	Kirill Tomilin
Episode 10 (April 16)	Egor Kreed	5	Alisa Trifonova	«No Time to Die» / «Golden Eye» / «Writing's On the Wall»	Evgeniya Gaydova	Eva Temnyk

== The Sing-offs ==
The Sing-offs start on April 2. Contestants who was saved by their coaches advanced to the Final.

Colour key

Artist was saved by his/her coach and advanced to the Final
Artist was eliminated but received the Comeback and advanced to the Live Extra round

Episode	Coach	Order	Artist	Song	Result
Episode 8 (April 2)	Basta	1	Polina Danilchenko	«Bim bam toi»	Advanced to the Live Extra round
Episode 8 (April 2)	Basta	2	Mariya Politikova	«Реченька»	Advanced to the Final
Episode 8 (April 2)	Basta	3	Timofey Zavalinich	«Беспечный ангел»	Advanced to the Live Extra round
Episode 8 (April 2)	Basta	4	Kira Gogoladze	«Contigo en la Distancia»	Advanced to the Final
Episode 8 (April 2)	Basta	5	Vasilisa Suyunova	«Toy»	Advanced to the Live Extra round
Episode 9 (April 9)	LOBODA	1	Sofiya Fanta	«Run to You»	Advanced to the Live Extra round
Episode 9 (April 9)	LOBODA	2	Miron Provorov	«Батарейка» / «F-R-I-E-N-D-S»	Advanced to the Live Extra round
Episode 9 (April 9)	LOBODA	3	Yuliya Gavrilova	«Ай вы, цыгане»	Advanced to the Final
Episode 9 (April 9)	LOBODA	4	Vladislav Tyukin	«Feelings»	Advanced to the Final
Episode 9 (April 9)	LOBODA	5	Kseniya Kovalenko	«Route 66»	Advanced to the Live Extra round
Episode 10 (April 16)	Egor Kreed	1	Anna Volkova	«My Heart Will Go On»	Advanced to the Final
Episode 10 (April 16)	Egor Kreed	2	Sofiya Medvedeva	«If I Ain't Got You»	Advanced to the Live Extra round
Episode 10 (April 16)	Egor Kreed	3	Elizaveta Trofimova	«Overjoyed»	Advanced to the Final
Episode 10 (April 16)	Egor Kreed	4	Georgiy Dzeboev	«УВЛИУВТ»	Advanced to the Live Extra round
Episode 10 (April 16)	Egor Kreed	5	Alisa Trifonova	«Shallow»	Advanced to the Live Extra round

== Live shows ==
Colour key

Artist was saved by the Public's votes
Artist was eliminated

=== Week 1: Live Extra round (April 23) ===
As with season 2, each coach saved three artists who were eliminated in the Sing-offs. Playoff results were voted on in real time. Nine artists sang live and six of them were eliminated by the end of the night. Three saved artists advanced to the Final.

Episode	Coach	Order	Artist	Song	Public's vote	Result
Episode 11 (April 23) (Note: Basta is The best coach of episode 11.)	Basta	1	Polina Danilchenko	"Песня мушкетёров"	23,7%	Eliminated
Episode 11 (April 23)	Basta	2	Timofey Zavalinich	"Без тебя"	51,2%	Advanced
Episode 11 (April 23)	Basta	3	Vasilisa Suyunova	"Танцы"	25,1%	Eliminated
Episode 11 (April 23)	LOBODA	4	Kseniya Kovalenko	"Jogi"	3,5%	Eliminated
Episode 11 (April 23)	LOBODA	5	Miron Provorov	"Наше лето"	35,2%	Eliminated
Episode 11 (April 23)	LOBODA	6	Sofiya Fanta	"Earth Song"	61,3%	Advanced
Episode 11 (April 23)	Egor Kreed	7	Georgiy Dzeboev	"Relax, Take It Easy" / "Не сходи с ума"	16,2%	Eliminated
Episode 11 (April 23)	Egor Kreed	8	Sofiya Medvedeva	"Под гипнозом"	13,3%	Eliminated
Episode 11 (April 23)	Egor Kreed	9	Alisa Trifonova	"A Million Dreams"	70,5%	Advanced

=== Week 2: Final (April 30) ===
Episode	Coach	Order	Artist	Song	Public's vote	Result
Episode 12 (April 30)
Episode 12 (April 30)	Final					
Episode 12 (April 30)	Basta	1	Timofey Zavalinich	"В самое сердце"	31,3%	Eliminated
Episode 12 (April 30)	Basta	2	Kira Gogoladze	"Amazing"	33,9%	Eliminated
Episode 12 (April 30)	Basta	3	Mariya Politikova	"Последняя поэма"	34,8%	Advanced
Episode 12 (April 30)	LOBODA	4	Yuliya Gavrilova	"Whenever, Wherever"	22,1%	Eliminated
Episode 12 (April 30)	LOBODA	5	Vladislav Tyukin	"Не отрекаются, любя"	55,7%	Advanced
Episode 12 (April 30)	LOBODA	6	Sofiya Fanta	"В наших глазах"	22,2%	Eliminated
Episode 12 (April 30)	Egor Kreed	7	Anna Volkova	"Ветер перемен"	10,7%	Eliminated
Episode 12 (April 30)	Egor Kreed	8	Alisa Trifonova	"Bring Me to Life"	25,4%	Eliminated
Episode 12 (April 30)	Egor Kreed	9	Elizaveta Trofimova	"Я скучаю по тебе"	63,9%	Advanced
Episode 12 (April 30)	Super Final					
Episode 12 (April 30)	Basta	1	Mariya Politikova	"До свиданья, лето"	14%	Third place
Episode 12 (April 30)	LOBODA	2	Vladislav Tyukin	"Who Wants to Live Forever?"	43,7%	Winner
Episode 12 (April 30)	Egor Kreed	3	Elizaveta Trofimova	"Спят усталые игрушки"	42,3%	Runner-up

Non-competition performances
Performer	Song
The Top 9 artists	"The Winner Takes It All"

== Best Coach ==
Colour key

- Best Coach
- Second place
- Third place
- Episode's Best Coach

Coach	Public's vote _{(per episode)}									Result
Coach	#1	#2	#3	#4	#5	#6	#7	#11	Av.	Result
Basta	56%	58%	59%	57%	60%	57%	57%	47%	56%	Best Coach
Egor Kreed	21%	26%	25%	29%	27%	27%	25%	40%	27%	Second place
LOBODA	23%	16%	16%	14%	13%	16%	18%	13%	17%	Third place
