= The Voice Kids (Russian TV series) =

TV singing competition

- Голос. Дети
- Genre: Music program
- Created by: John de Mol; Roel van Velzen
- Developed by: C1R
- Directed by: Yuri Aksyuta
- Creative directors: Larisa Sinelshchikova; Konstantin Ernst
- Presented by: Dmitry Nagiev; Yana Churikova; Natalia Vodianova; Anastasiya Chevazhevskaya; Valeriya Lanskaya; Svetlana Zeynalova; Agata Muceniece; Aglaya Shilovskaya; Valya Karnaval
- Judges: Dima Bilan; Pelageya; Maxim Fadeev; Leonid Agutin; Nyusha; Valery Meladze; Basta; LOBODA; Polina Gagarina; Egor Kreed; MakSim; Yulianna Karaulova; JONY; Vladimir Presnyakov; Natalia Podolskaya; Aida Garifullina; Vanya Dmitrienko; Alexey Vorobyov
- Country of origin: Russia
- Original language: Russian
- No. of seasons: 12

Production
- Production location: Mosfilm
- Running time: 120 minutes
- Production company: Krasny Kvadrat

Original release
- Network: Channel One
- Release: February 28, 2014 – present

Related
- The Voice Russia; The Voice Senior Russia; The Voice (franchise)

The Voice Kids is a Russian reality television singing competition broadcast on Channel One. Based on the original The Voice Kids of Holland, the concept of the series is to find currently unsigned singing talent contested by aspiring singers, age 6 to 15, drawn from public auditions. The winner is determined by television viewers voting by SMS text.

The winners of the twelve seasons have been: Alisa Kozhikina, Sabina Mustaeva, Danil Pluzhnikov, Elizaveta Kachurak, Rutger Garekht, all 9 finalists of 6th season, Olesya Kazachenko, Vladislav Tyukin, Adeliya Zagrebina, Anna Dorovskaya, Vasily Igolkin and Mariya Nikulina.

The series employs a panel of three coaches who critique the artists' performances and guide their teams of selected artists through the remainder of the season. They also compete to ensure that their act wins the competition, thus making them the winning coach. The original panel featured Dima Bilan (seasons 1―4, 11―12), Pelageya (seasons 1―3, 5―6) and Maxim Fadeev (seasons 1―2). The panel for the upcoming thirteenth season featured Polina Gagarina (seasons 7, 9, 13-), Alexey Vorobyov & Aida Garifullina (season 13-) and Vanya Dmitrienko (season 13). Other coaches include Leonid Agutin (season 3), Nyusha (season 4), Valery Meladze (seasons 4―7), Basta (seasos 5, 7―10), LOBODA (season 6 and 8), Polina Gagarina (seasons 7 and 9), Egor Kreed (seasons 8-―10), MakSim (season 10), Yulianna Karaulova (season 11), JONY (season 11), Vladimir Presnyakov & Natalia Podolskaya (season 12) and Aida Garifullina (season 12).

The Voice Kids began airing on February 28, 2014, as a winter-spring TV season programme. The show proved to be a hit for Channel One.

In 2023, there was a spin-off called «The Voice. No Longer Kids», which features former participants competing in a fashion similar to the All-Stars version that originated in France.

== Conception ==
An adaptation of the Dutch show The Voice Kids, Channel One announced the show under the name Голос. Дети (The Voice Kids).

In each season, the winner receives ₽500,000 and a record deal for their own album.

=== Selection process and format ===
Blind auditions

Each season begins with the "Blind Auditions", where coaches form their team of artists whom they mentor through the remainder of the season. The coaches' chairs are faced towards the audience during artists' performances; those interested in an artist press their button, which turns their chair towards the artist and illuminates the bottom of the chair to read "Я выбираю тебя" ("I CHOOSE YOU"). At the conclusion of the performance, an artist either defaults to the only coach who turned around or selects their coach if more than one coach expresses interest.

Battles

In the Battle Rounds, each coach groups three of their team members to perform together and then chooses one to advance in the competition.

Sing-offs

In the Sing-off Rounds, remaining artists within a team sing individual performances in succession. At the conclusion of the performances, coaches would decide which three artists get to advance to the next round.

Final

In the Final of the competition, nine artists from all teams perform in the live show, where public voting narrows to a final group of three artists and after second round of performances eventually declares a winner.

== Coaches ==
Timeline
Coach	Seasons												
Coach	1	2	3	4	5	6	7	8	9	10	11	12	13
Dima Bilan													
Pelageya													
Maxim Fadeev													
Leonid Agutin													
Nyusha													
Valery Meladze													
Basta													
LOBODA													
Polina Gagarina													
Egor Kreed													
MakSim													
Yulianna Karaulova													
JONY													
Vladimir Presnyakov													
Natalia Podolskaya													
Aida Garifullina													
Vanya Dmitrienko													
Alexey Vorobyov													

Coaches gallery

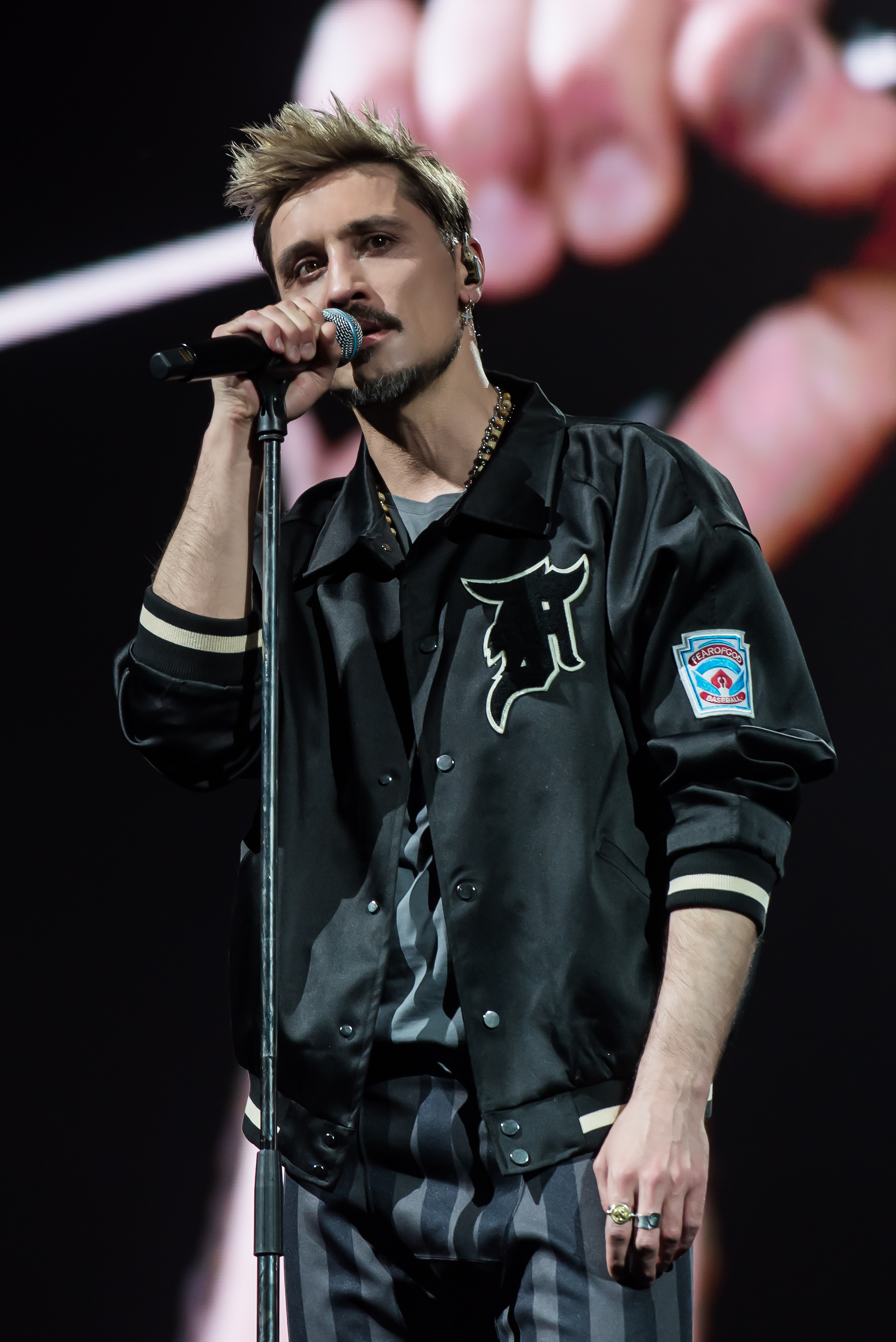
Dima Bilan (seasons 1–4, 11–12)

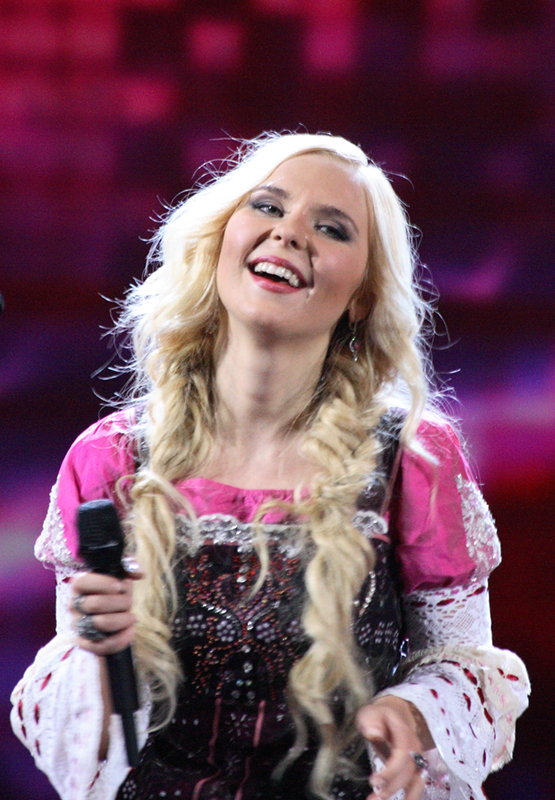
Pelageya (seasons 1–3, 5–6)

Maxim Fadeev (seasons 1–2)

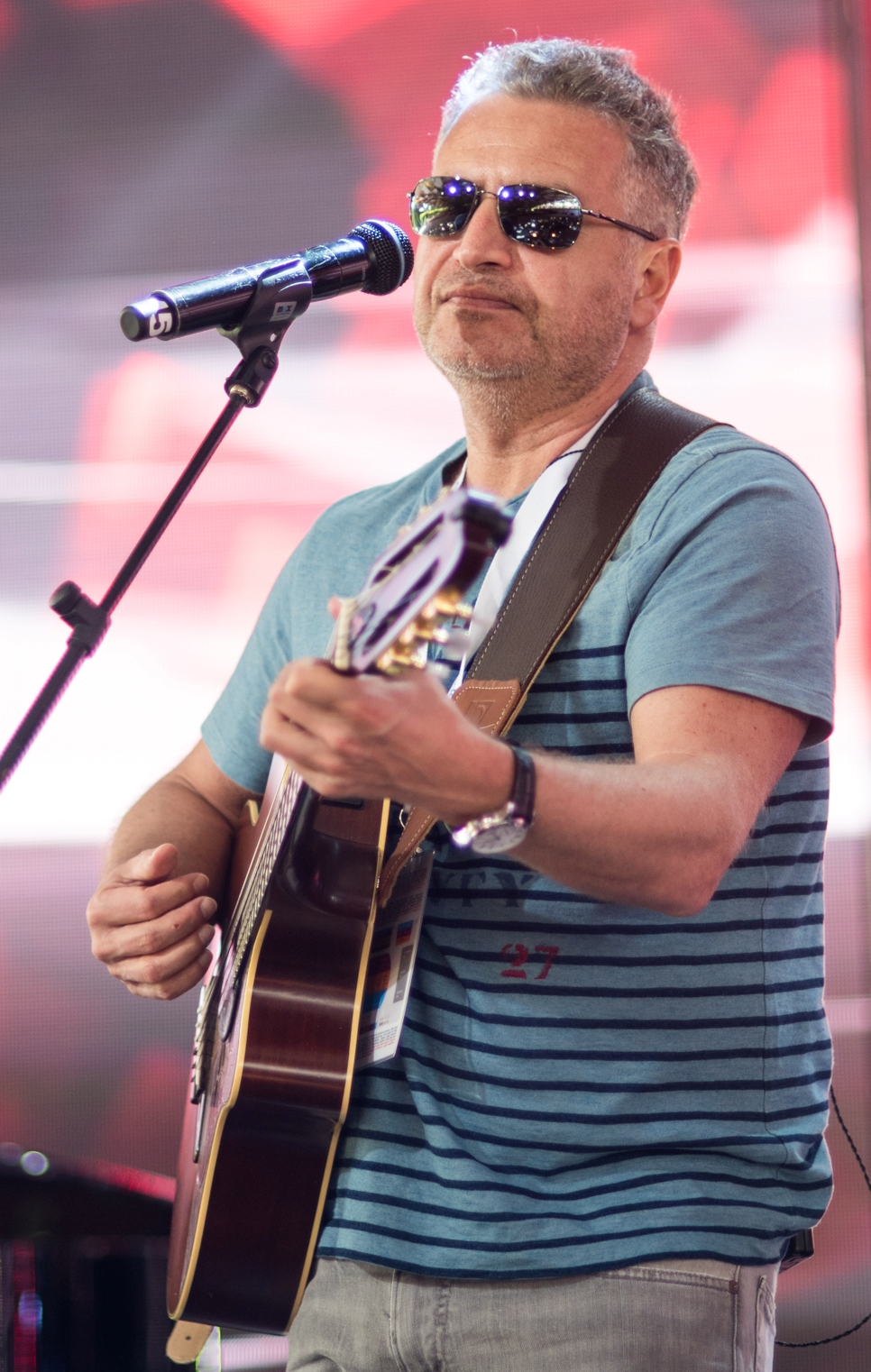
Leonid Agutin (season 3)

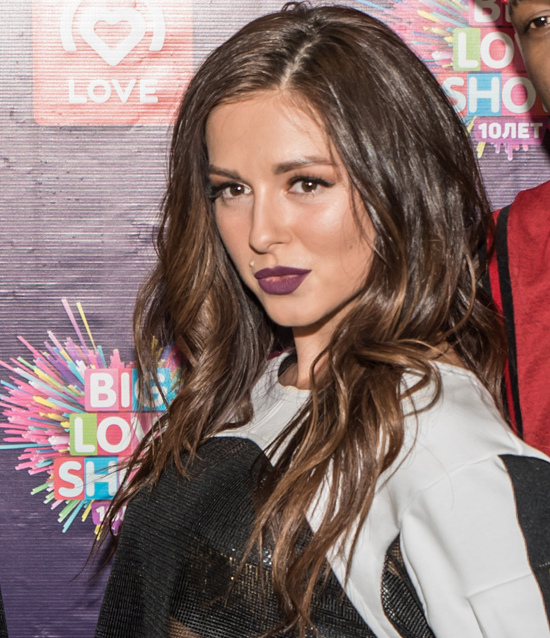
Nyusha (season 4)

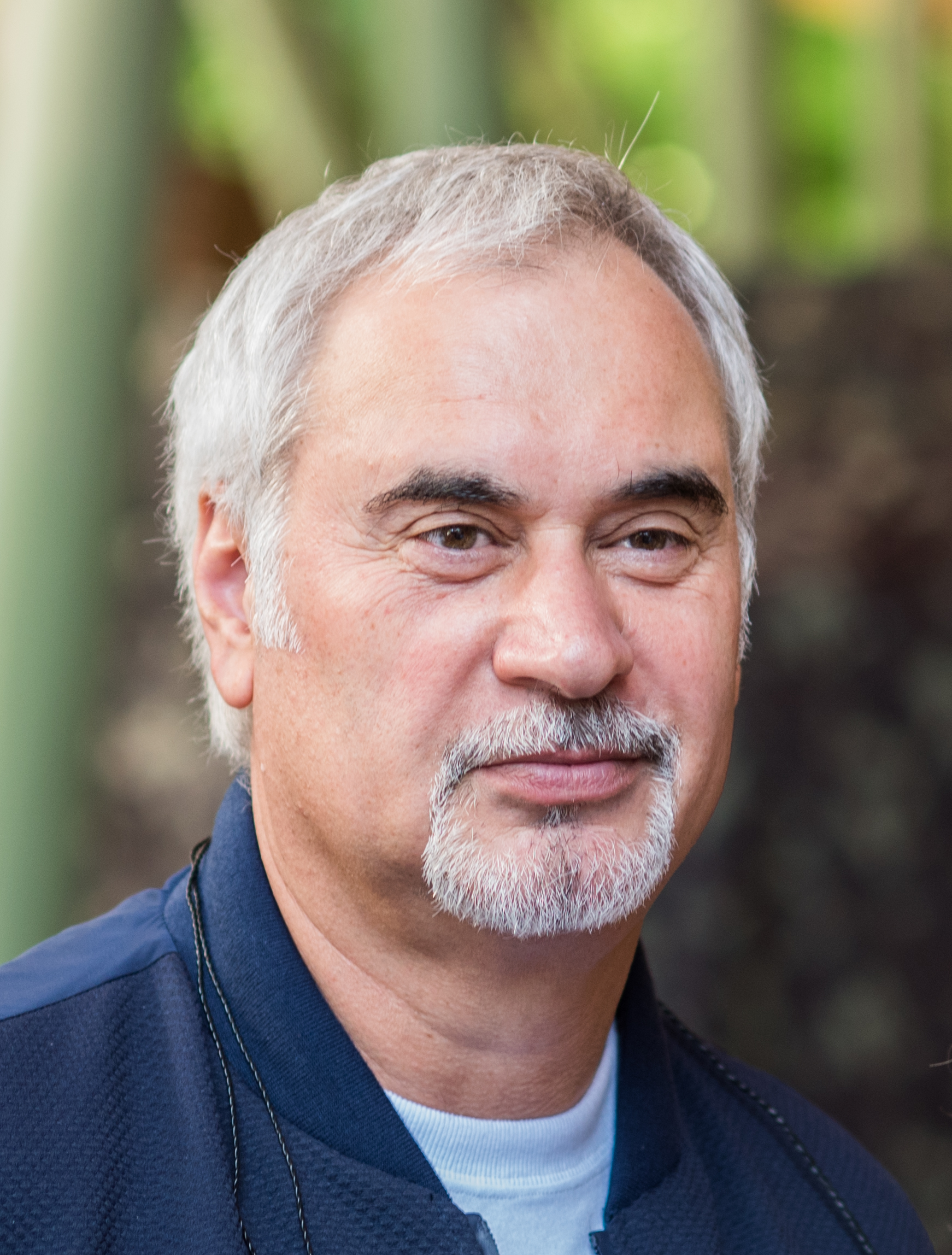
Valery Meladze (seasons 4–7)

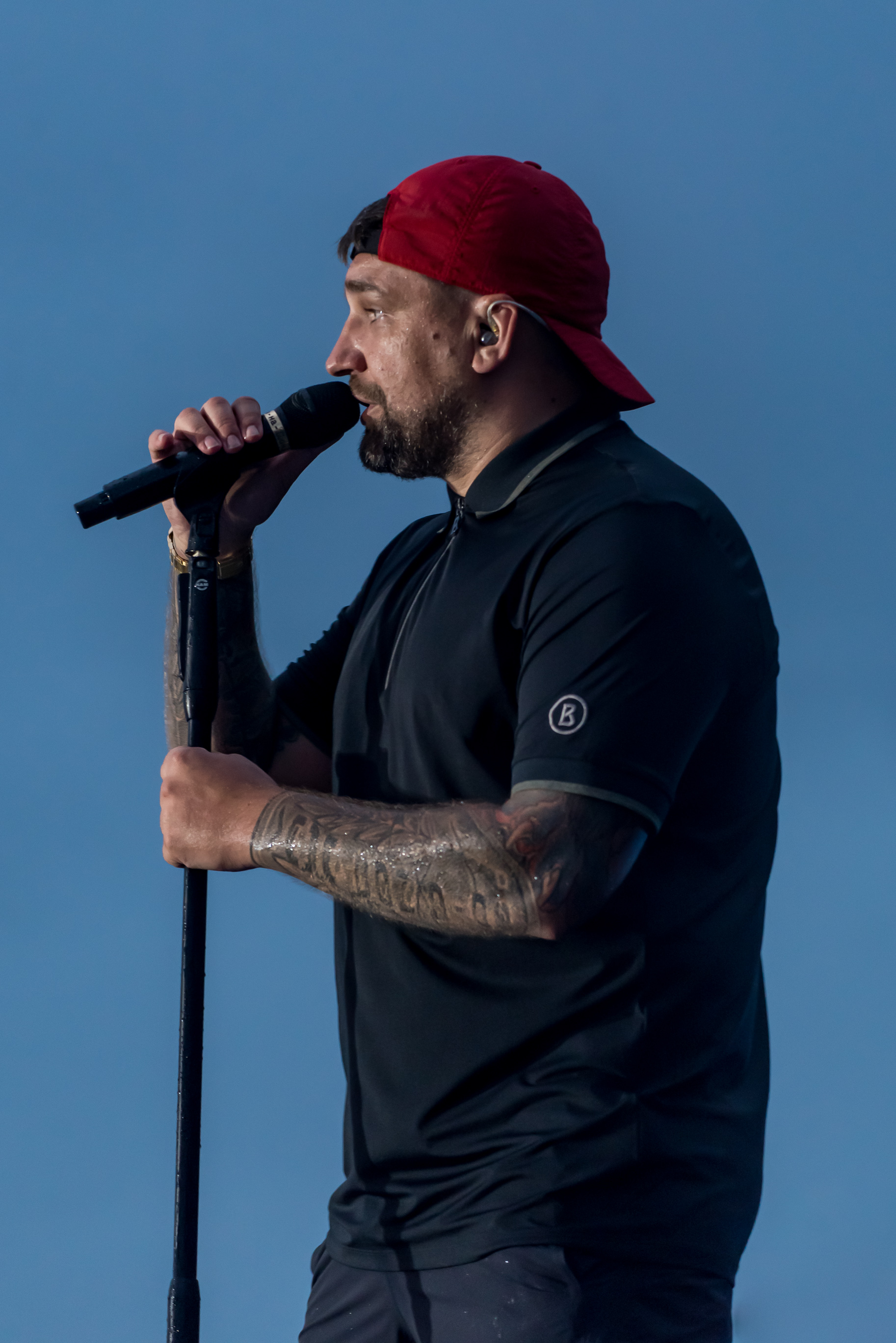
Basta (seasons 5, 7–10)

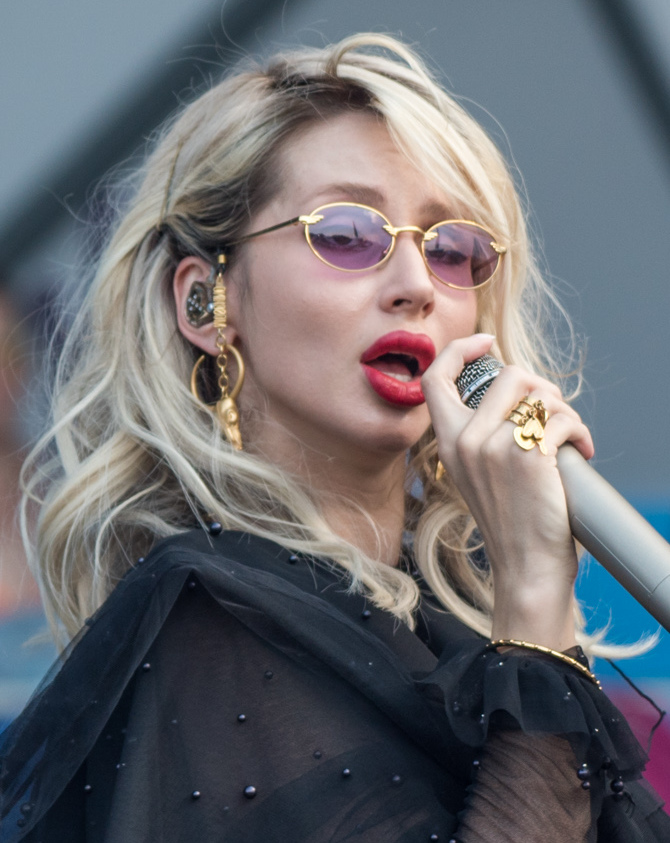
LOBODA (seasons 6, 8)

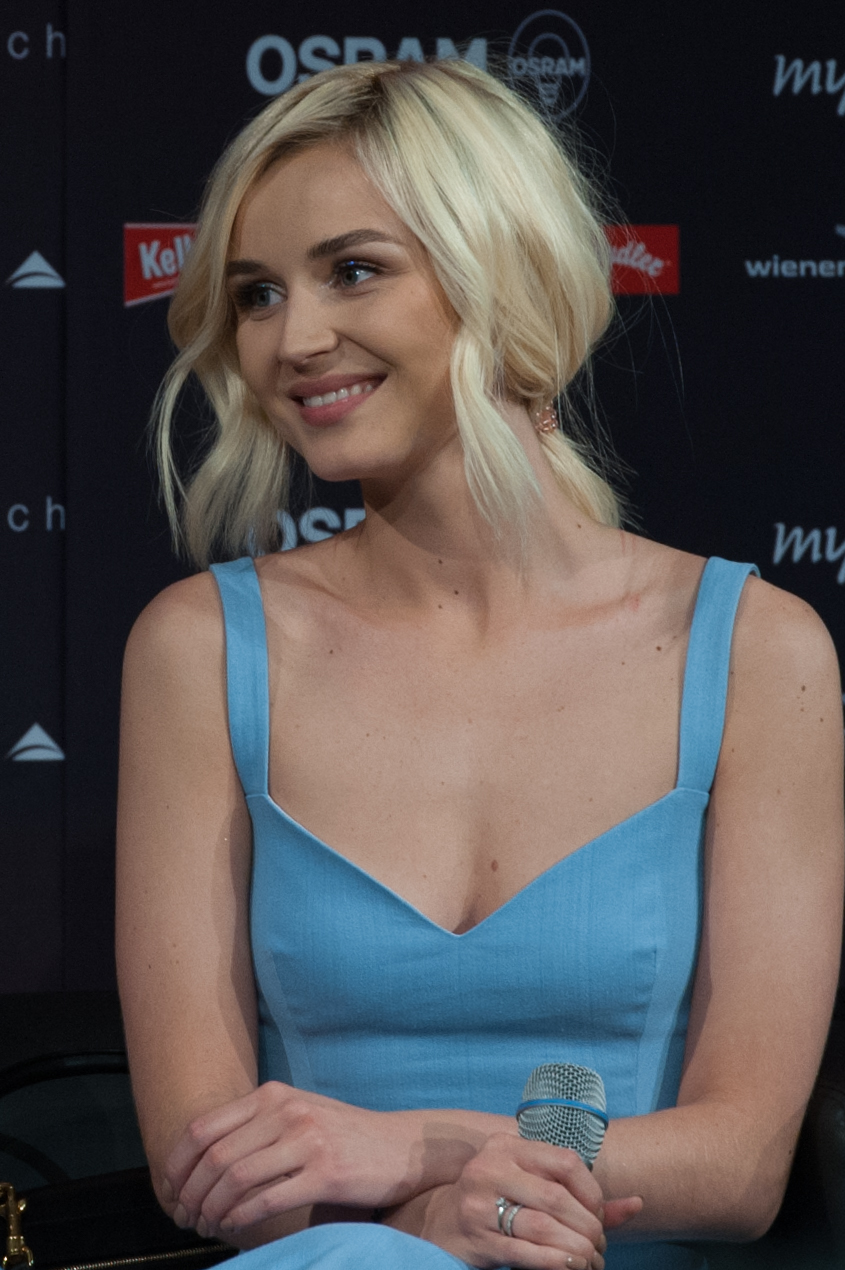
Polina Gagarina (seasons 7, 9, 13-)

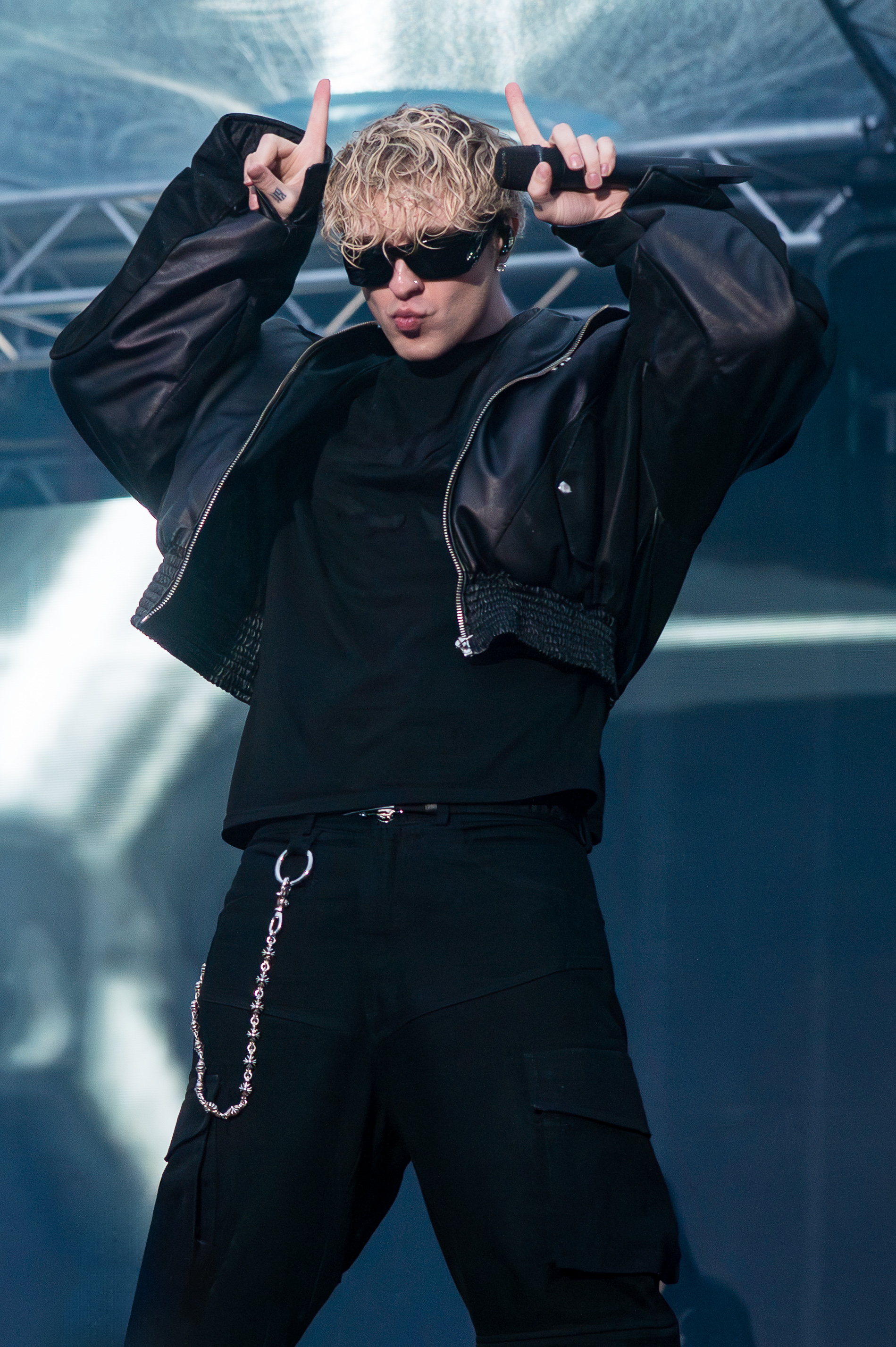
Egor Kreed (seasons 8–10)

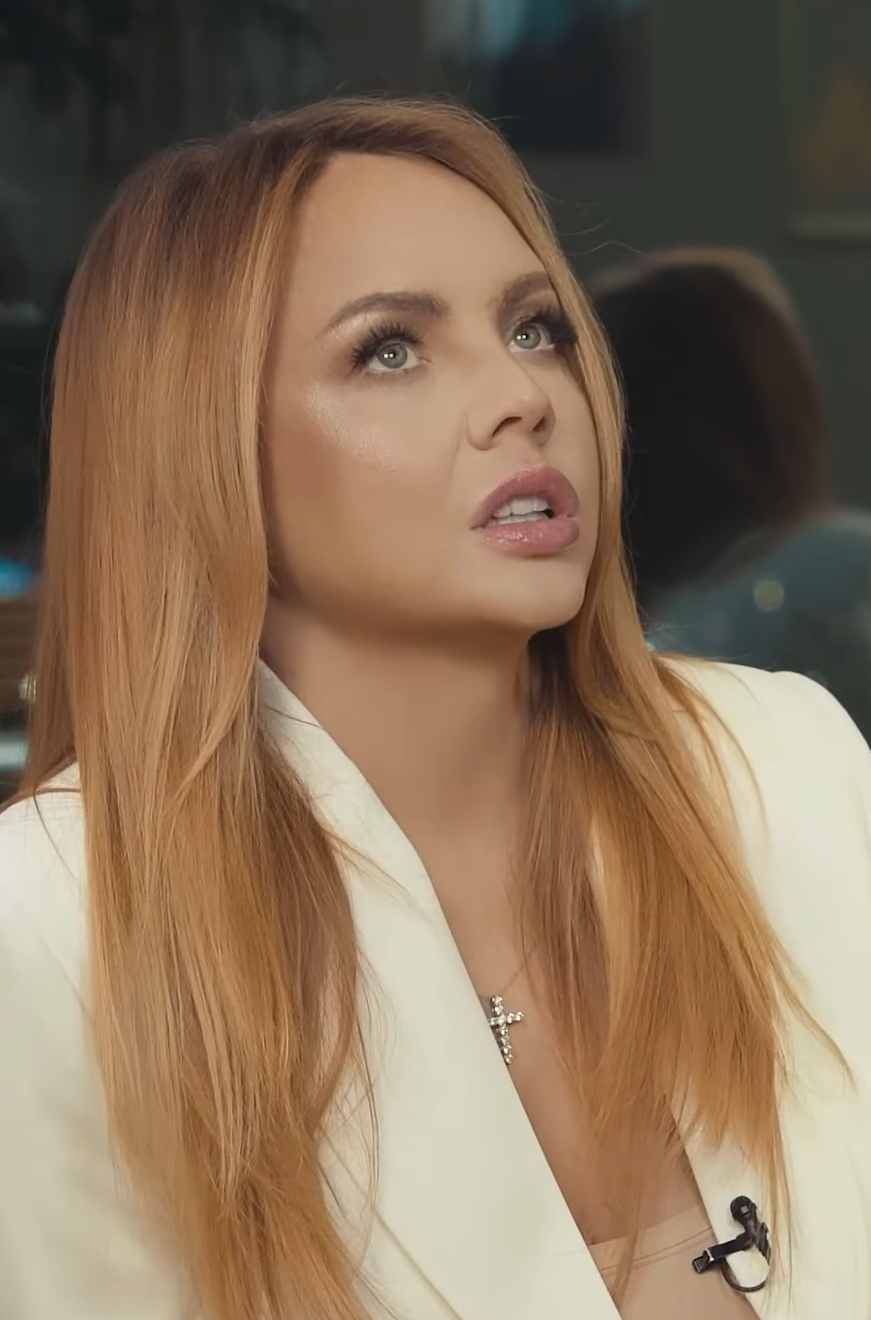
MakSim (season 10)

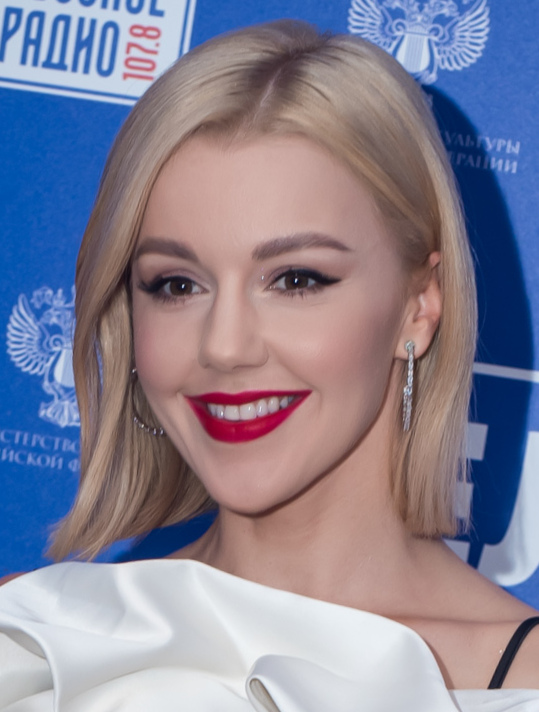
Yulianna Karaulova (season 11)

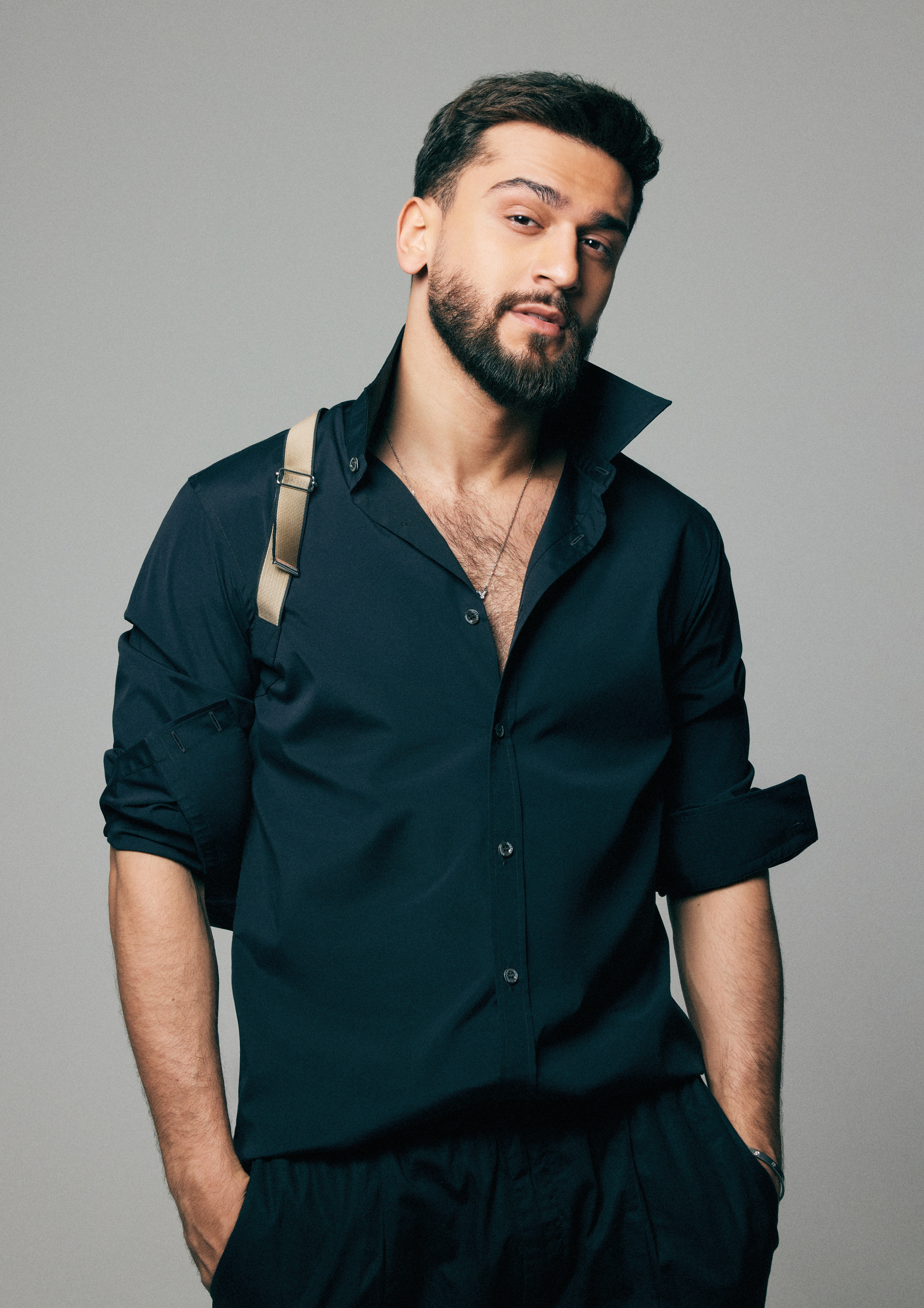
JONY (season 11)

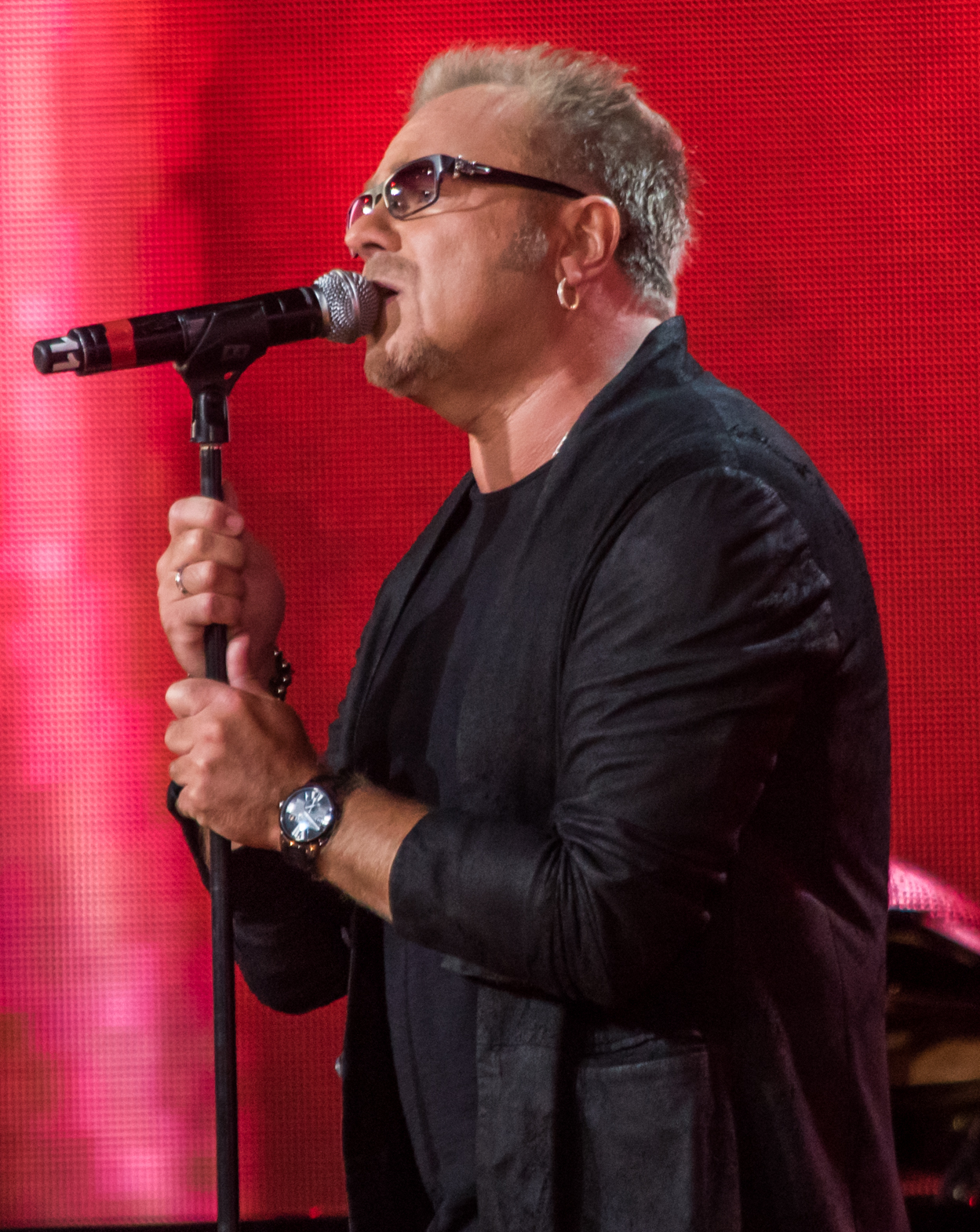
Vladimir Presnyakov (duo: season 12)

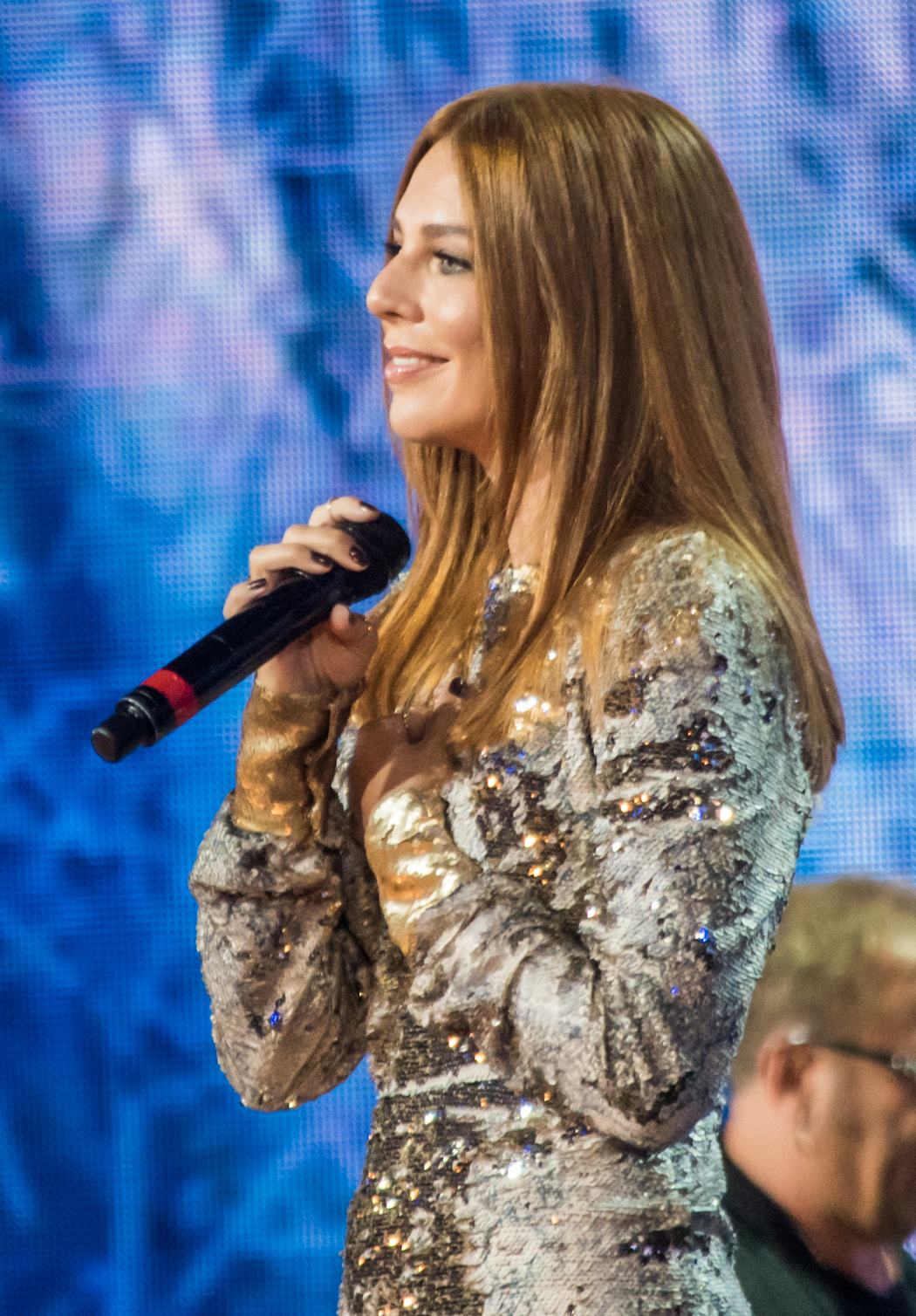
Natalia Podolskaya (duo: season 12)

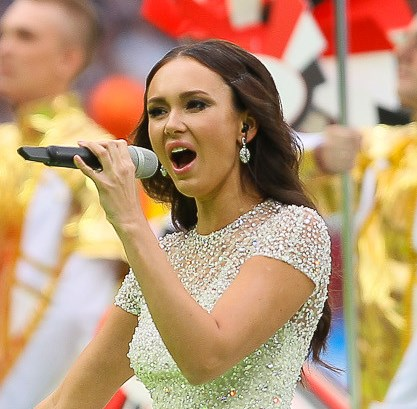
Aida Garifullina (solo: season 12; duo: season 13-)

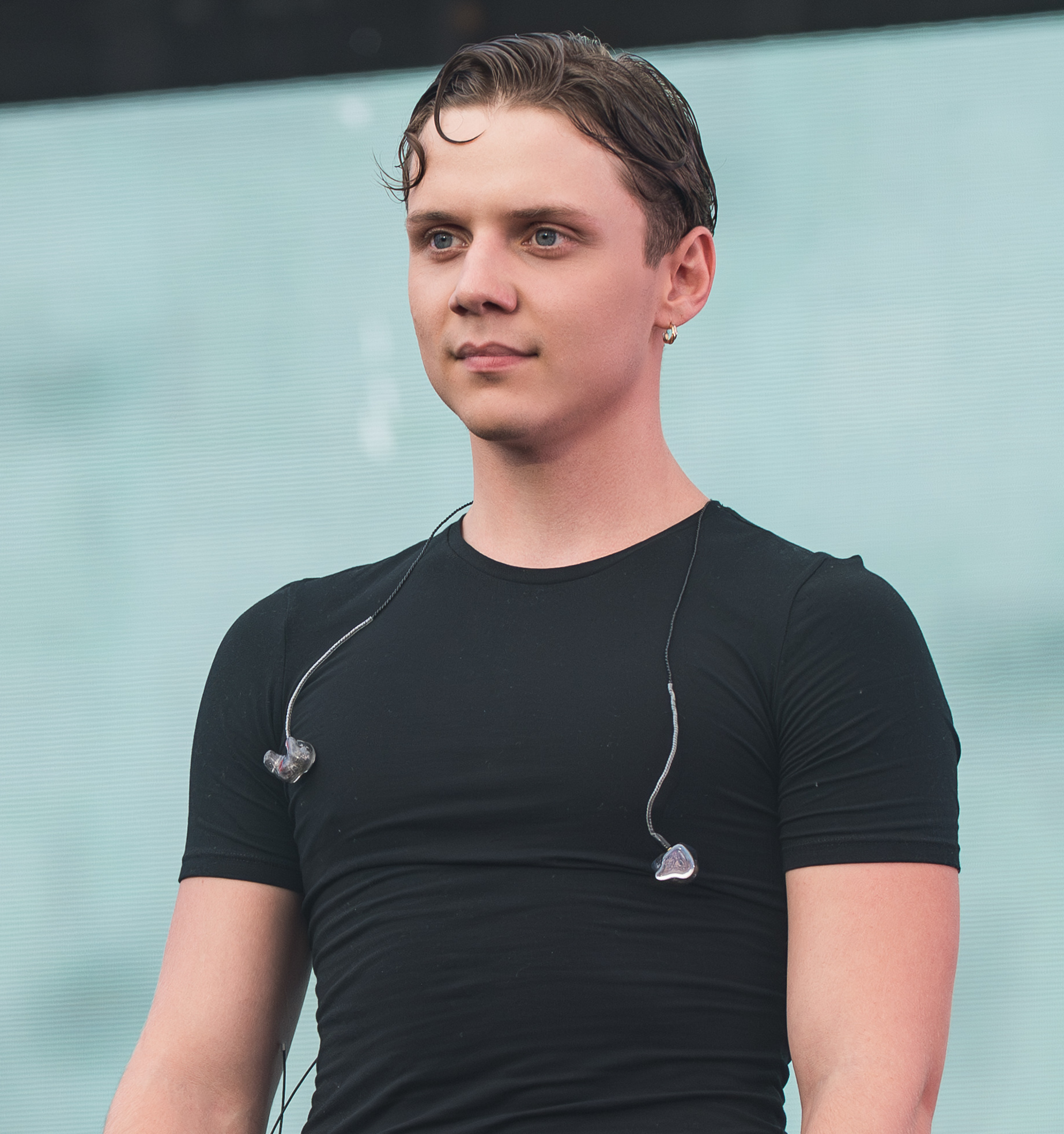
Vanya Dmitrienko (season 13-)

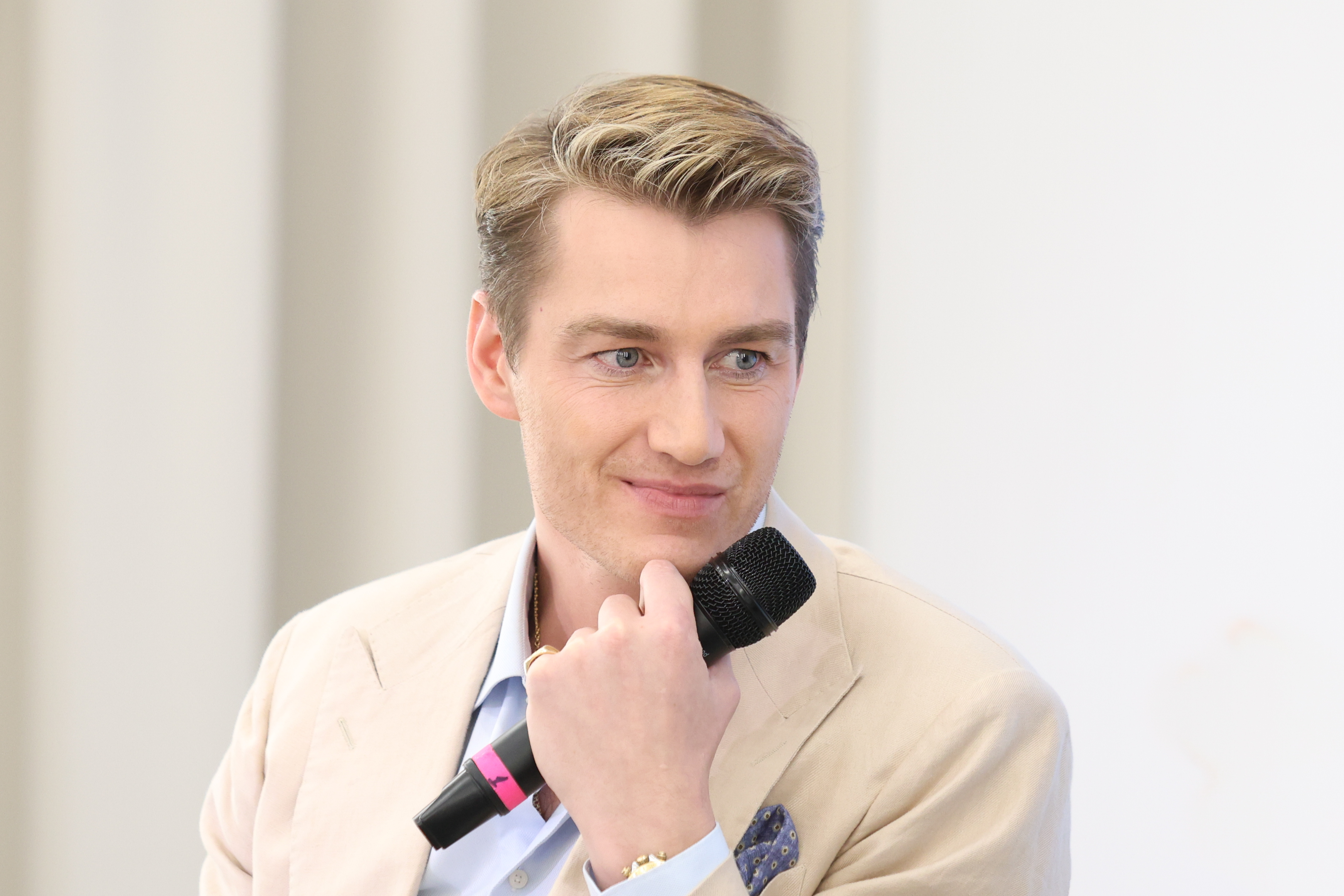
Alexey Vorobyov (duo, season 13-)
Presenters gallery

=== Presenter ===
Timeline
Presenter	Seasons												
Presenter	1	2	3	4	5	6	7	8	9	10	11	12	13
Main presenters
Dmitry Nagiev													
Yana Churikova													
Co-presenters
Natalia Vodianova													
Anastasiya Chevazhevskaya													
Valeriya Lanskaya													
Svetlana Zeynalova													
Agata Muceniece													
Aglaya Shilovskaya													
Valya Karnaval													

Presenters

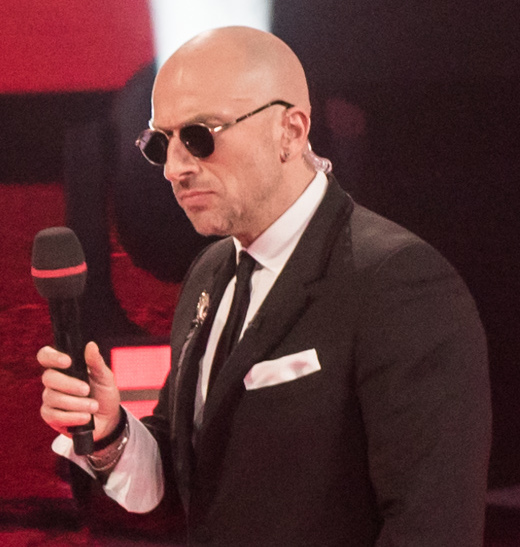
Dmitry Nagiev (seasons 1―9)

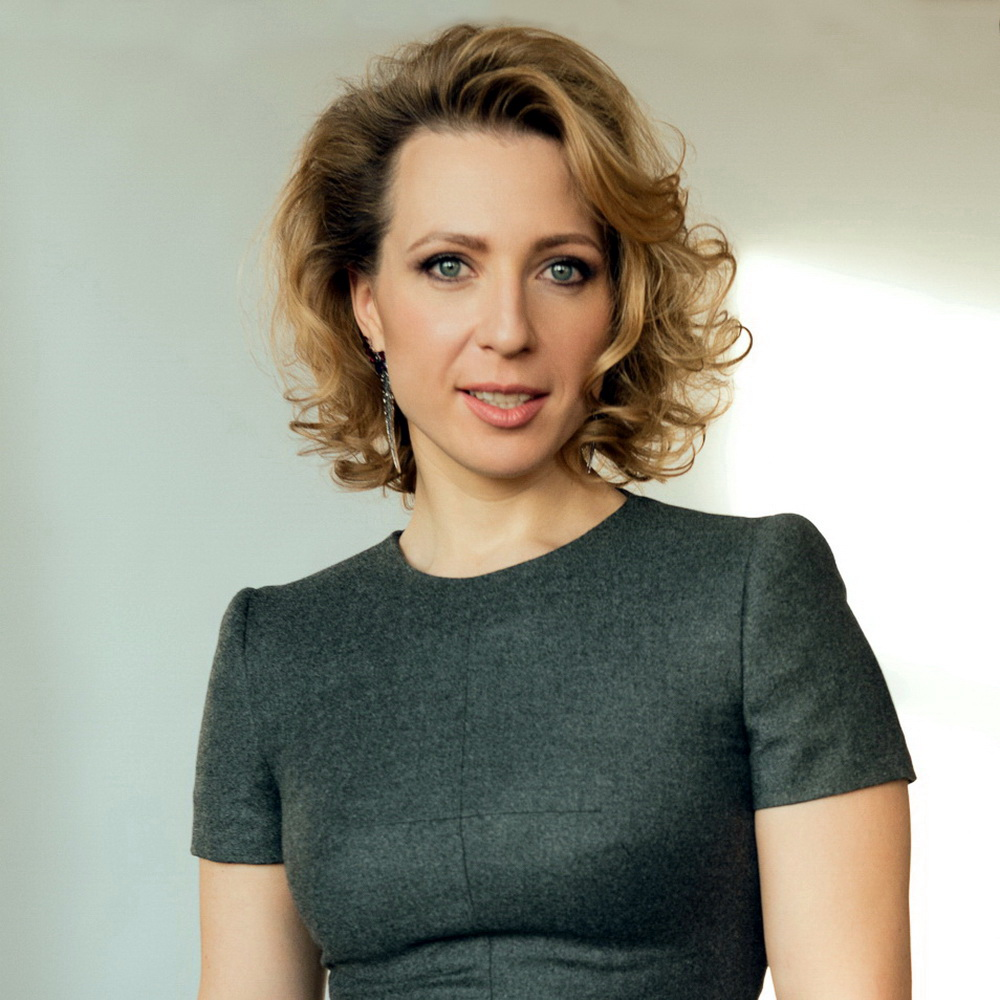
Yana Churikova (seasons 10―)

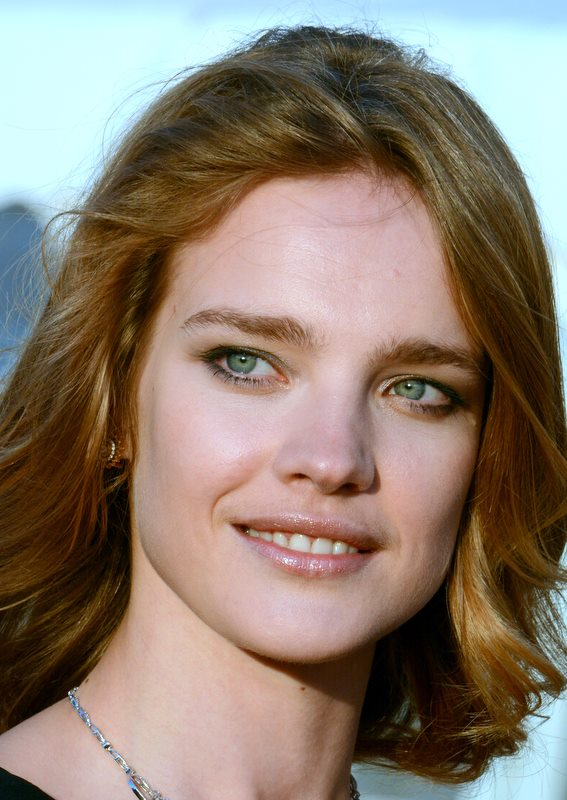
Natalia Vodianova (season 1)

Anastasia Chevazhevskaya (season 2)

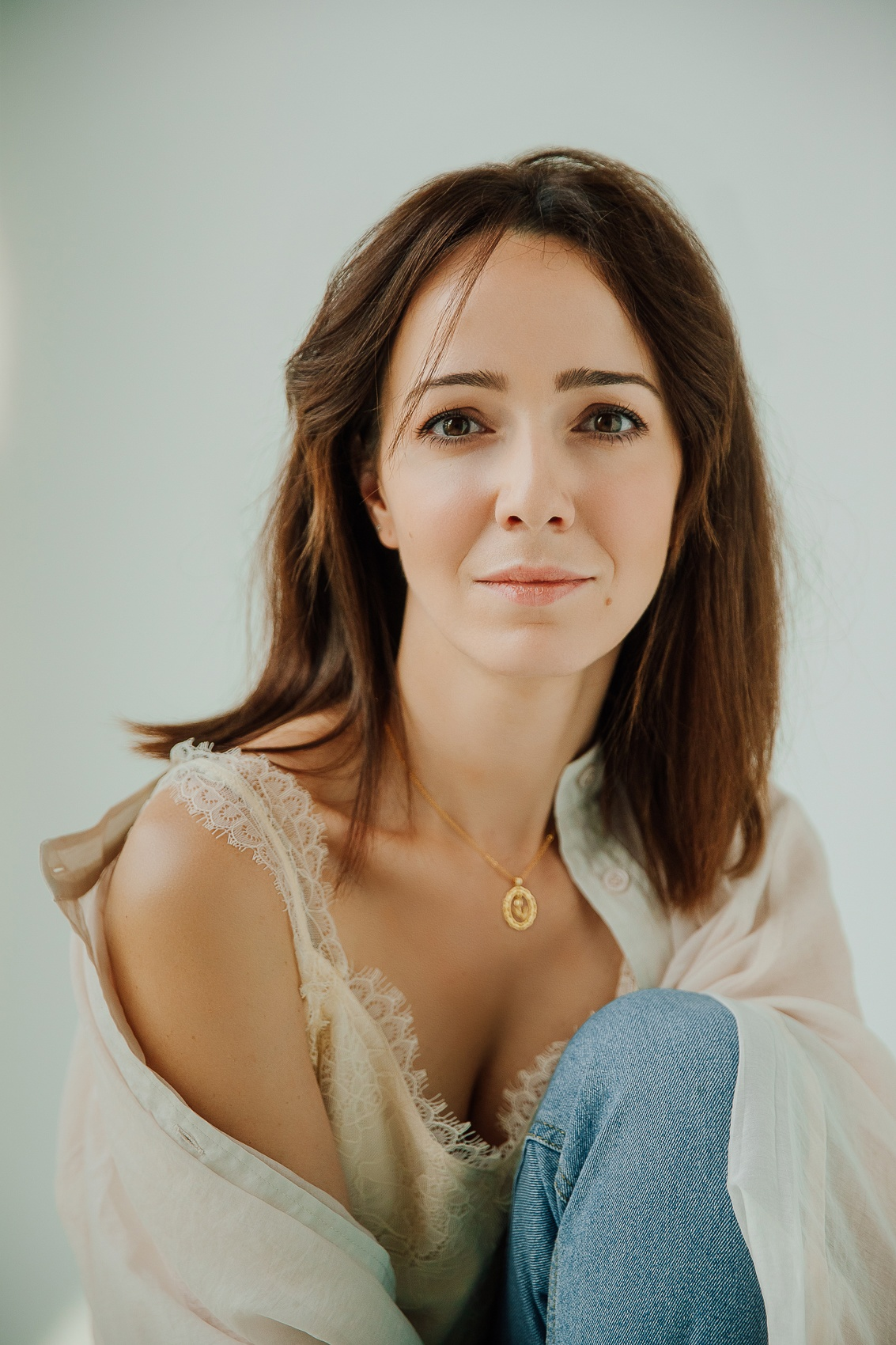
Valeriya Lanskaya (season 3)

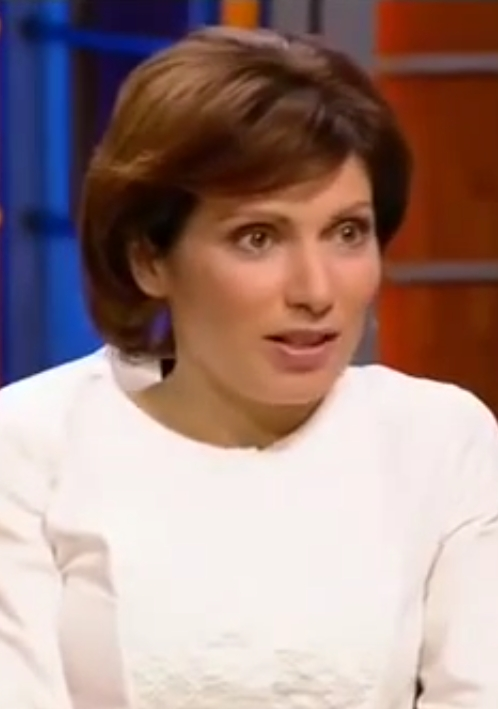
Svetlana Zeynalova (season 4)

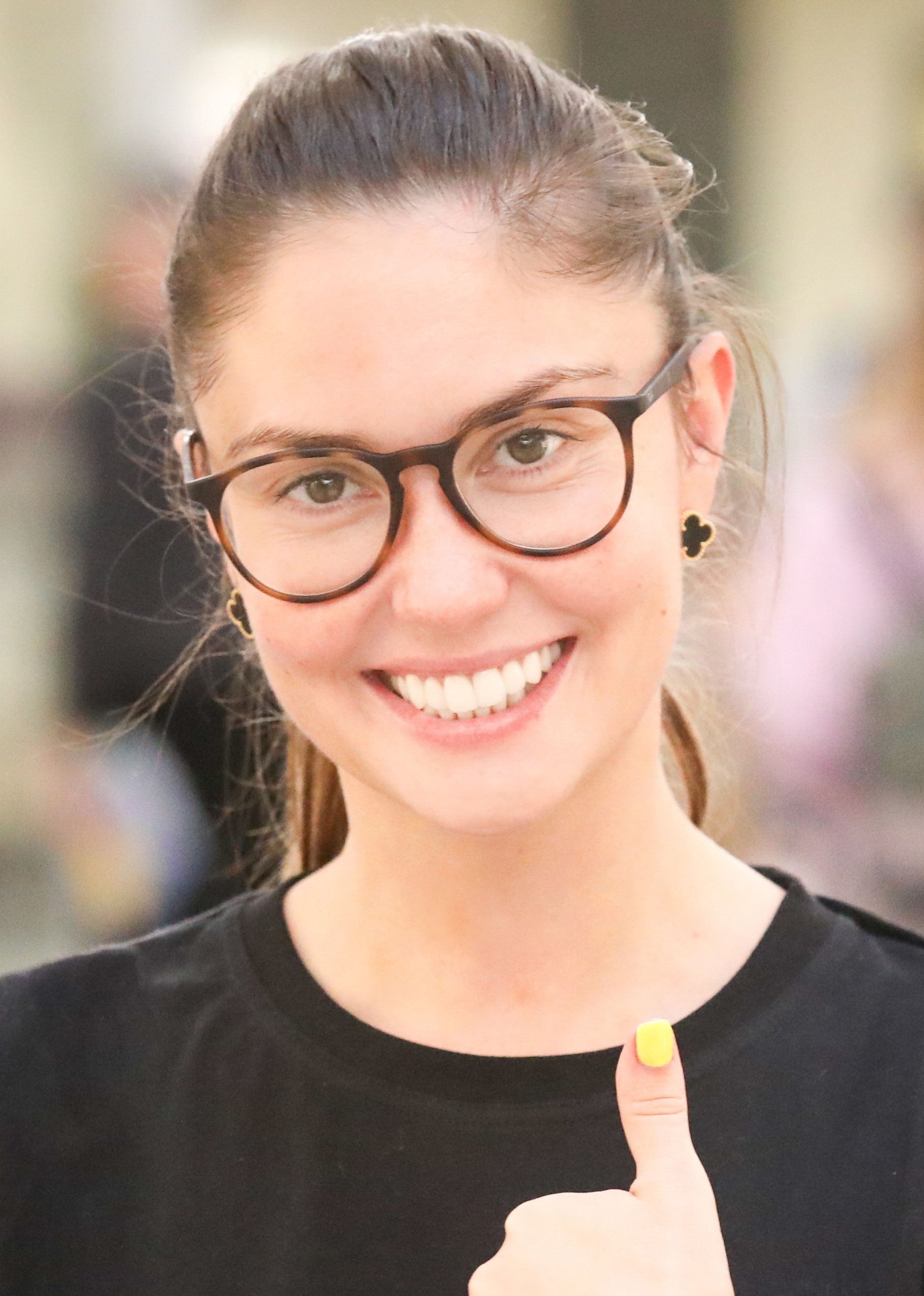
Agata Muceniece (seasons 5, 7-10)

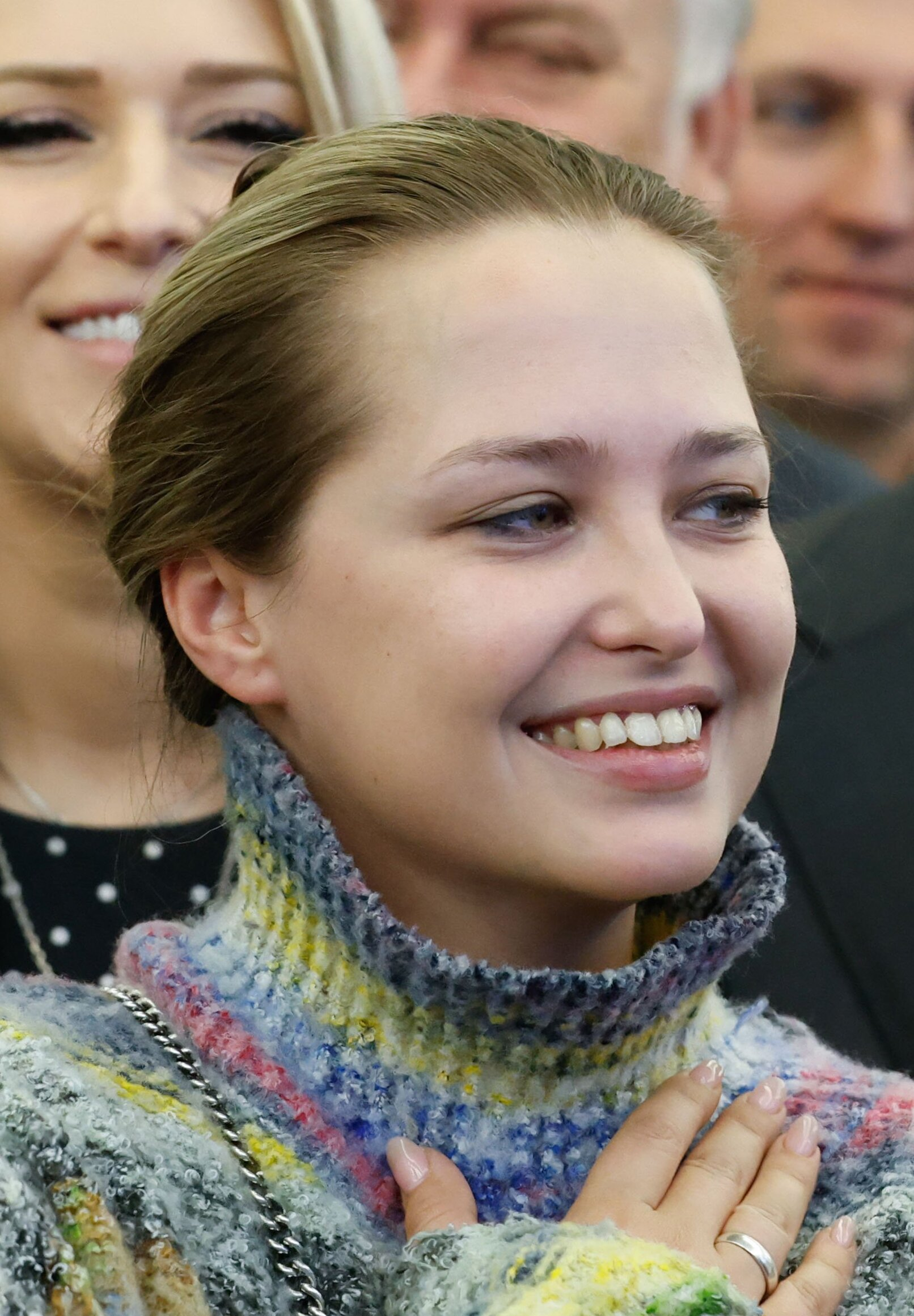
Aglaya Shilovskaya (season 6)

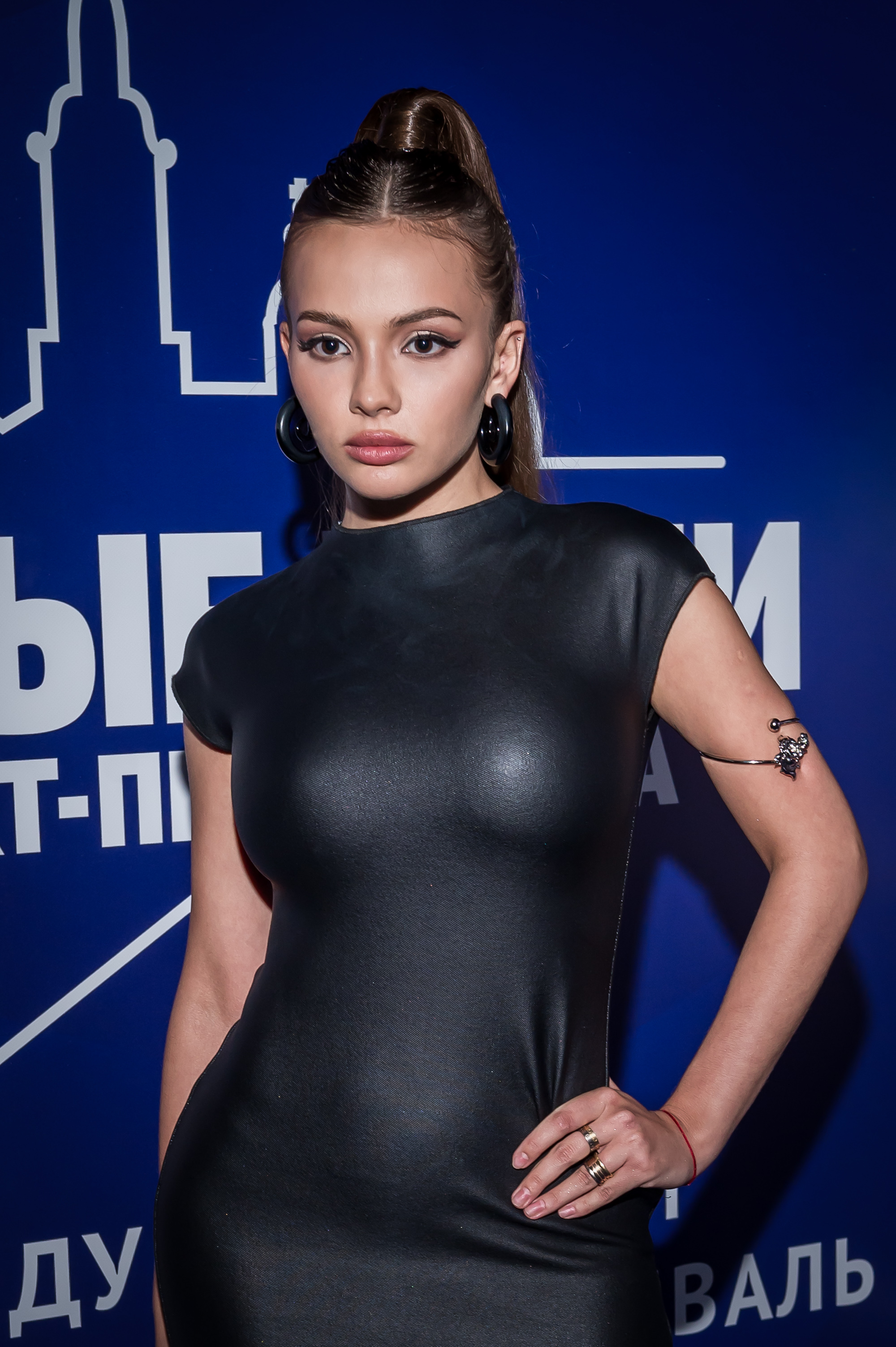
Valya Karnaval (seasons 11-)

== Teams ==
Season	Coaches and their finalists		
1	Dima Bilan	Pelageya	Maxim Fadeev
1	Lev Akselrod; Kristian Kostov	Ragda Khanieva; Anastasiya Titova	Alisa Kozhikina; Ivaнlo Filippov
2	Evdokiya Malevskaya; Alexey Zabugin; Sofiya Kvaratskheliya	Saida Mukhametzyanova; Matvey Semishkur; Mikhail Smirnov	Sabina Mustaeva; Yaroslav Sokolikov; Eduard Rediko
3	Dima Bilan	Pelageya	Leonid Agutin
3	Danil Pluzhnikov; Yaroslava Degtyareva; Maria Panyukova	Taisiya Podgornaya; Azer Nasibov; Vsevolod Rudakov	Rayana Aslanbekova; Eva Timush; Marsel Sabirov
4	Dima Bilan	Nyusha	Valery Meladze
4	Elizaveta Kachurak; Alisa Golomysova; Snezhana Shin	Alina Sansyzbay; Yulianna Beregoy; Eva Medved	Deniza Khekilaeva; Alexander Dudko; Stefaniya Sokolova
5	Basta	Pelageya	Valery Meladze
5	Sofiya Fedorova; Akmal Khodzhaniyazov; Alexandra Ushakova	Rutger Garekht; Veronika Syromlya; Eden Golan	Anastasiya Gladilina; Olesya Masheiko; Tali Kuper
6	Pelageya	Valery Meladze	LOBODA
6	Valery Kuzakov; Renata Tairova; Mariam Abdelkader	Erzhan Maxim; Mikhail Grigoryan; Anastasiya Sisauri	Mikella Abramova; Nino Chesner; Robert Bagratyan
7	Basta	Polina Gagarina	Valery Meladze
7	Olesya Kazachenko; Ivan Kurgalin; Sofya Lyoret	Artyom Fokin; Artyom Morozov; Mirzhan Zhidebay	Sofya Tumanova; Kirill Alexandrov; Kristina Siller
8	Basta	LOBODA	Egor Kreed
8	Mariya Politikova; Kira Gogoladze; Timofey Zavalinich	Vladislav Tyukin; Sofiya Fanta; Yuliya Gavrilova	Elizaveta Trofimova; Alisa Trifonova; Anna Volkova
9	Basta	Polina Gagarina	Egor Kreed
9	Sofiya Olaresko; Elisey Kasich; Kseniya Kann	Sagyn Omirbayuly; Malika Taygibova; Anastasiya Chumakova	Adeliya Zagrebina; Fyodor Sorokin; Shamil Ibadov
10	Basta	MakSim	Egor Kreed
10	Anna Dorovskaya; Konstantin Gorishnyakov; Ivan Rogunov	Pavel Zilyov; Lev Smirnov; Marianna Ayrapetyants	Milana Ponomarenko; Denis Makarov; Sofi Singkh
11	Dima Bilan	Yulianna Karaulova	JONY
11	Vasily Igolkin; Nelly Baymatova; Grigory Druzhinin	Arina Tochilova; Roman Skrobot; Evelina Radbil	Said Galiullin; Andrey Pribylsky; Anna Kukina
12	Dima Bilan	Vladimir Presnyakov & Natalia Podolskaya	Aida Garifullina
12	Mariya Nikulina; Matvey Didenko; Anita Petrosyan	Zhasmina Tuzelova; Milana Krokhina; Matvey Yaitsky	Arina Kiyashko; Giuseppe Di Menza; Viktoriya Zakharova
13	Vanya Dmitrienko	Alexey Vorobyov & Aida Garifullina	Polina Gagarina

== Series overview ==
Team Dima Bilan
Team Pelageya
Team Maxim Fadeev
Team Leonid Agutin
Team Nyusha
Team Valery Meladze

Team Basta
Team LOBODA
Team Polina Gagarina
Team Egor Kreed
Team MakSim
Team Yulianna Karaulova

Team JONY
Team Vladimir & Natalia
Team Aida Garifullina
Team Vanya Dmitrienko
Team Alexey Vorobyov & Aida Garifullina

Russian The Voice Kids overview
Season	First released	Last released	Winner	Runner-up	Third place	Winning coach	Presenters		Coaches (chair's order)		
Season	First released	Last released	Winner	Runner-up	Third place	Winning coach	1	2	1	2	3
1	February 28, 2014	April 25, 2014	Alisa Kozhikina	Ragda Khanieva	Lev Akselrod	Maxim Fadeev	Dmitry Nagiev	Natalia Vodianova	Dima	Pelageya	Maxim
2	February 13, 2015	April 17, 2015	Sabina Mustaeva	Evdokiya Malevskaya	Saida Mukhametzyanova	Maxim Fadeev	Dmitry Nagiev	Anastasiya Chevazhevskaya	Dima	Pelageya	Maxim
3	February 20, 2016	April 29, 2016	Danil Pluzhnikov	Rayana Aslanbekova	Taisiya Podgornaya	Dima Bilan	Dmitry Nagiev	Valeriya Lanskaya	Dima	Pelageya	Leonid
4	February 17, 2017	April 28, 2017	Elizaveta Kachurak	Deniza Khekilaeva	Alina Sansyzbay	Dima Bilan	Dmitry Nagiev	Svetlana Zeynalova	Dima	Nyusha	Valery
5	February 2, 2018	April 20, 2018	Rutger Garekht	Sofiya Fedorova	Anastasiya Gladilina	Pelageya	Dmitry Nagiev	Agata Muceniece	Basta	Pelageya	Valery
6	February 15, 2019	April 26, 2019	By decision of the producers, all 9 finalists were named winners of the season. (Note: Valery Kuzakov, Renata Tairova, Mariam Abdelkader (team Pelageya); Erzhan Maxim, Mikhail Grigoryan, Anastasia Sisauri (team Meladze); Mikella Abramova, Nino Chesner, Robert Bagratyan (team LOBODA).)				Dmitry Nagiev	Aglaya Shilovskaya	Pelageya	Valery	LOBODA
7	February 14, 2020	April 24, 2020	Olesya Kazachenko	Sofya Tumanova	Artyom Fokin	Basta	Dmitry Nagiev	Agata Muceniece	Basta	Polina	Valery
8	February 12, 2021	April 30, 2021	Vladislav Tyukin	Elizaveta Trofimova	Mariya Politikova	LOBODA	Dmitry Nagiev	Agata Muceniece	Basta	LOBODA	Egor
9	February 18, 2022	April 29, 2022	Adeliya Zagrebina	Sofiya Olaresko	Sagyn Omirbayuly	Egor Kreed	Dmitry Nagiev	Agata Muceniece	Basta	Polina	Egor
10	December 2, 2022	February 22, 2023	Anna Dorovskaya	Milana Ponomarenko	Pavel Zilyov	Basta	Yana Churikova	Agata Muceniece	Basta	MakSim	Egor
11	September 6, 2024	November 29, 2024	Vasily Igolkin	Said Galiullin	Arina Tochilova	Dima Bilan	Yana Churikova	Valya Karnaval	Dima	Yulianna	JONY
12	September 5, 2025	November 28, 2025	Mariya Nikulina	Arina Kiyashko	Zhasmina Tuzelova	Dima Bilan	Yana Churikova	Valya Karnaval	Dima	Vladimir & Natalia	Aida
13	September 25, 2026	Current season					Yana Churikova	Valya Karnaval	Vanya	Alexey & Aida	Polina

Coaches' results
Coach	Winner	Runner-up	Third place
Dima Bilan	Four time (3―4; 11―12)	Once (2)	Once (1)
Basta	Twice (7; 10)	Twice (5; 9)	Once (8)
Maxim Fadeev	Twice (1―2)	—	—
Pelageya	Once (5) + co-winner (6)	Once (1)	Twice (2―3)
LOBODA	Once (8) + co-winner (6)	—	—
Egor Kreed	Once (9)	Twice (8; 10)	—
Valery Meladze	Co-winner (6)	Twice (4; 7)	Once (5)
Leonid Agutin	—	Once (3)	—
JONY	—	Once (11)	—
Aida Garifullina	—	Once (12)	—
Polina Gagarina	—	—	Twice (7; 9)
Nyusha	—	—	Once (4)
MakSim	—	—	Once (10)
Yulianna Karaulova	—	—	Once (11)
Vladimir Presnyakov & Natalia Podolskaya	—	—	Once (12)
Alexey Vorobyov & Aida Garifullina	—	—	—
Vanya Dmitrienko	—	—	—

== Best Coach ==
Season	Best Coach					
Season	First place		Second place		Third place	
1−5	From seasons 1 through 5, the public didn't determine the Best coach.					
6	Pelageya	56%	Valery Meladze	25%	LOBODA	19%
7	Basta	40%	Polina Gagarina	33%	Valery Meladze	27%
8	Basta	56%	Egor Kreed	27%	LOBODA	17%
9	Basta	42%	Polina Gagarina	37%	Egor Kreed	21%
10	Basta	60%	Egor Kreed	24%	MakSim	16%
11	Dima Bilan	52%	Yulianna Karaulova	26%	JONY	22%
12	Dima Bilan	51%	Aida Garifullina	29%	Vladimir Presnyakov & Natalia Podolskaya	20%

== The Voice. No Longer Kids ==
Team Dima Bilan
Team Pelageya
Team Polina Gagarina
Team Egor Kreed

Season	Year	Winner	Runner-up	Third place	Fourth place	Winning Coach	Best Coach	Presenters	Coaches (chair's order)			
Season	Year	Winner	Runner-up	Third place	Fourth place	Winning Coach	Best Coach	Presenters	1	2	3	4
1	2023	Veronika Syromlya	David Sanikidze	Renata Tairova	Olesya Kazachenko	Egor Kreed	Pelageya	Yana Churikova	Dima	Pelageya	Polina	Egor
