= The Voice Kids (Russian TV series) season 12 =

The Voice Kids
- Season 12
- Presented by: Yana Churikova; Valya Karnaval
- Coaches: Dima Bilan; Vladimir Presnyakov & Natalia Podolskaya; Aida Garifullina
- Winner: Maria Nikulina
- Winning coach: Dima Bilan
- Runner-up: Arina Kiyashko

Release
- Original network: Channel One
- Original release: 5 September – 28 November 2025

Season chronology
- ← Previous; Season 11

The twelfth season of the Russian reality talent show The Voice Kids premiered on 5 September 2025 on Channel One. Yana Churikova and Valya Karnaval returned as the show's presenters. Dima Bilan returned as a coach and was joined by Aida Garifullina and duo Vladimir Presnyakov & Natalia Podolskaya.

Maria Nikulina was announced the winner of this season, marking Dima Bilan's fourth win as a coach on The Voice Kids. With Nikulina's win, Bilan became the first coach on the Kids version of the show to win more than three seasons (Bilan became the first coach to win three seasons on the Kids version in the previous season). In addition, Bilan also became the third coach out of all versions of the show to win four times, behind Alexander Gradsky and Pelageya.

== Coaches and presenters ==
The Voice Kids season 12 coaches

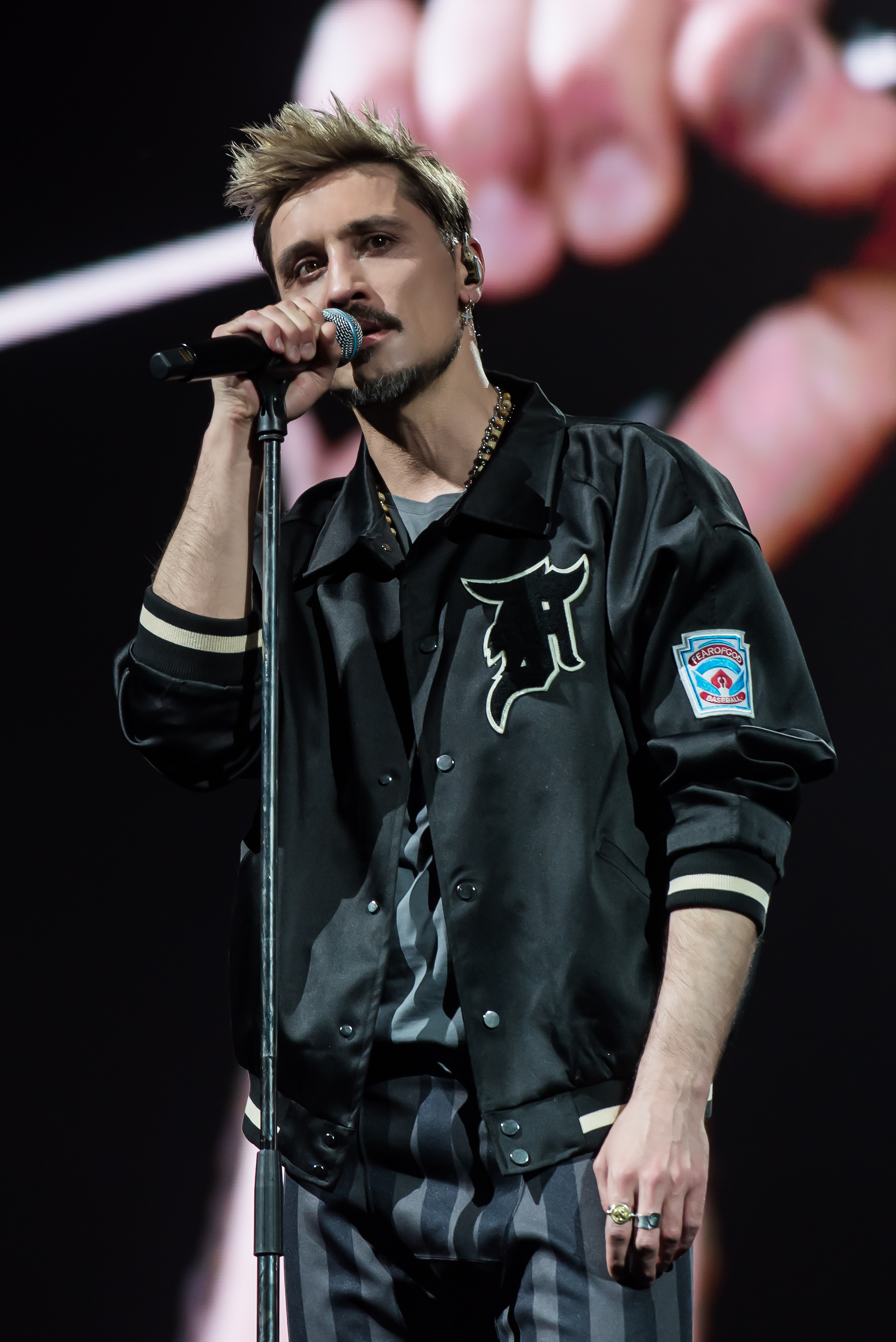
Dima Bilan

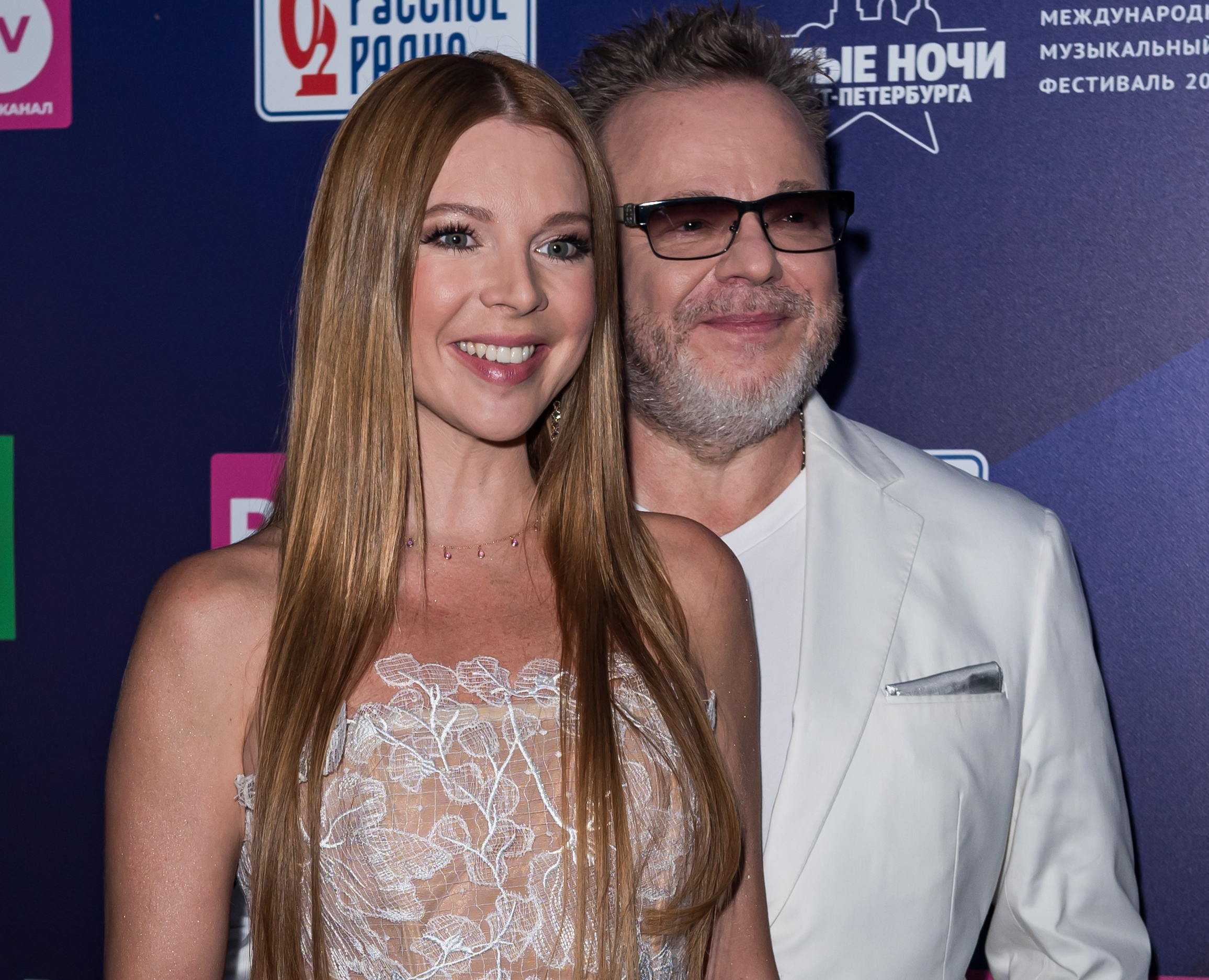
Vladimir Presnyakov & Natalia Podolskaya (duo)

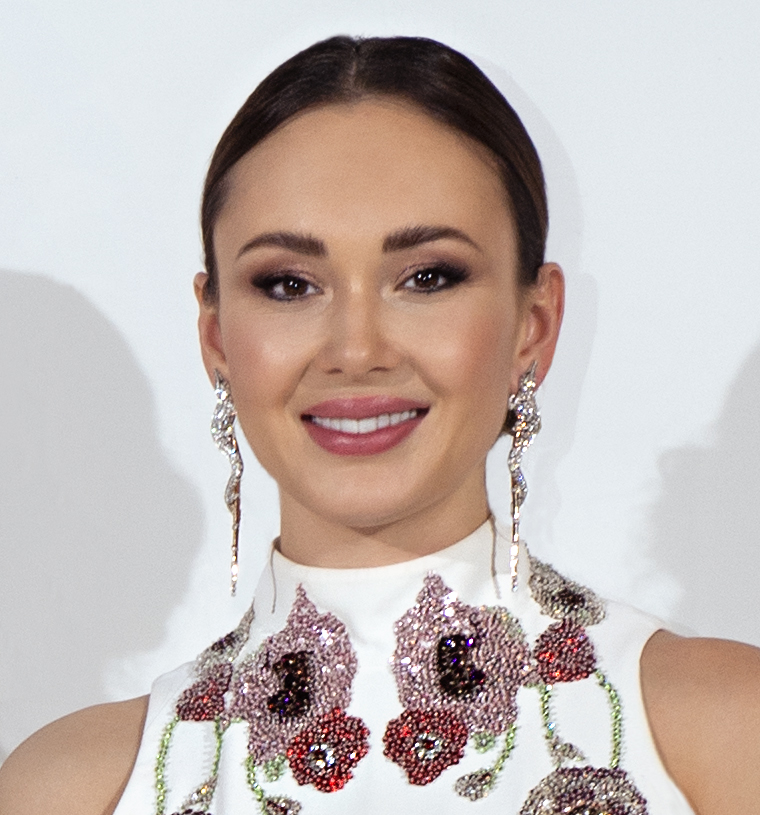
Aida Garifullina

On August 12, 2025, it was announced that Dima Bilan would return as a coach from the previous season. He was joined by new coaches Aida Garifullina and the first coaching duo in the show's history, Vladimir Presnyakov & Natalia Podolskaya. Presnyakov has previously served as a coach in the show's adult version.

Yana Churikova and Valya Karnaval returned as the show's presenters.

== Teams ==
Colour key

- Winner
- Runner-up
- Third place
- Eliminated in the Final
- Eliminated in the Live Extra round
- Eliminated in the Battle rounds

Coaches	Top 54 artists					
Dima Bilan	Maria Nikulina	Anita Petrosyan	Matvey Didenko	Albert Ramazanov	Anna Paramonova	Lydia Lakhtyukhova
Dima Bilan	Stefan Gasparyan	Semyon Kashtanov	Taisia Litonina	Esenia Prozorova	Sofia Nagalina	Alina Archakova
Dima Bilan	Elizaveta Strikhar	Stepan Smirnov	Lev Pisanko	Alexandra Rozhkova	Sofia Damarnatskaya	Elizaveta Mikhailova
Vladimir Presnyakov & Natalia Podolskaya	Zhasmina Tuzelova	Matvey Yaitsky	Milana Krokhina	Sofia Shishikina	Veronica Tarasova	Veronica Shcherban
Vladimir Presnyakov & Natalia Podolskaya	Jacqueline Alekseeva	Christina Myaz	Anastasia Bulatetskaya	Sultana-Mira Chorbaji	Miron Zirnov	Artur Zverovich
Vladimir Presnyakov & Natalia Podolskaya	Daria Nedelskaya	Bogdan Belov	Ilya Simbaev	Kristina Vilyaeva	Margarita Zingman	Prokhor Borisov
Aida Garifullina	Arina Kiyashko	Viktoria Zakharova	Joseppe Di Menca	Maria Markova-Butirskaya	Bogdan Tokar	Milana Ananko
Aida Garifullina	Alexandra Ryabikina	Roman Zhuchkov	Milina Khairullina	Makar Shcheglov	Zlata Uchaykina	Anya Tsareva
Aida Garifullina	Arina Kovrigina	Malika Zeinalova	Darya Vaganova	Arseniy Bardin	Mark Petrosyan	Tatiana Babelyuk
Note: Italicized names are stolen contestants (who were eliminated in the Sing-offs, but were stolen in the Live Extra round and advanced to the Final).

== Blind auditions ==
Colour key

✔	Coach pressed "I WANT YOU" button
✔	Coach pressed "I WANT YOU", despite the lack places in his/her team
	Artist defaulted to a coach's team
	Artist picked a coach's team
	Artist eliminated with no coach pressing their button

The coaches performed "Blue Canary" at the start of the show.

Episode	Order	Artist	Age	Hometown	Song	Coach's and artist's choices		
Episode	Order	Artist	Age	Hometown	Song	Bilan	Presnyakov & Podolskaya	Garifullina
Episode 1 (Note: Dima Bilan is The best coach of episode 1.) (September 5, 2025)	1	Alexandra Ryabikina	7	Moscow	"Золушка"	✔	✔	✔
Episode 1 (September 5, 2025)	2	Matvey Yaitsky	10	Dolgoprudny, Moscow Oblast	"Алёшка"	—	✔	✔
Episode 1 (September 5, 2025)	3	Sofiya Shishikina	10	Tula	"She Taught Me How to Yodel"	✔	✔	✔
Episode 1 (September 5, 2025)	4	Dmitry Eremeev	15	Cheboksary	"Самолёты"	—	—	—
Episode 1 (September 5, 2025)	5	Elizaveta Mikhaylova	9	Moscow	"А цыган идёт"	✔	—	—
Episode 1 (September 5, 2025)	6	Anita Petrosyan	12	Saint Petersburg	"All by Myself"	✔	—	✔
Episode 1 (September 5, 2025)	7	Serafim Labutin	10	Odintsovo, Moscow Oblast	"Есаул"	—	—	—
Episode 1 (September 5, 2025)	8	Valeriya Shubich	14	Minsk, Belarus	"Call Me"	—	—	—
Episode 1 (September 5, 2025)	9	Matvey Didenko	12	Kurgan	"Песня о далёкой Родине"	✔	—	—
Episode 2 (Note: Dima Bilan is The best coach of episode 2.) (September 12, 2025)	1	Miron Zernov	6	Belgorod	"Душа нараспашку"	✔	✔	✔
Episode 2 (September 12, 2025)	2	Sofiya Damarnatskaya	12	Penza	"Лучшее в тебе"	✔	—	✔
Episode 2 (September 12, 2025)	3	Vladislav Bogomolov	9	Saint Petersburg	"Представь себе"	—	—	—
Episode 2 (September 12, 2025)	4	Milana Krokhina	13	Vladimir	"Con te partirò / Let's Get It Started"	✔	✔	✔
Episode 2 (September 12, 2025)	5	Roman Zhuchkov	8	Kursk	"Эти глаза напротив"	—	—	✔
Episode 2 (September 12, 2025)	6	Sofiya Khomyakova	11	Belgorod	"I Surrender"	—	—	—
Episode 2 (September 12, 2025)	7	Sofiya Dolgireva	7	Moscow	"Разноцветные ярмарки"	—	—	—
Episode 2 (September 12, 2025)	8	Milina Khayrullina	12	Kazan	"Лодочка"	—	—	✔
Episode 2 (September 12, 2025)	9	Bogdan Belov	10	Lipetsk	"The House of the Rising Sun"	—	✔	✔
Episode 3 (Note: Dima Bilan is The best coach of episode 3.) (September 19, 2025)	1	Makar Shcheglov	9	Novomoskovsk, Tula Oblast	"Смуглянка"	—	—	✔
Episode 3 (September 19, 2025)	2	Sofiya Nagalina	13	Voronezh	"Меланхолия"	✔	—	✔
Episode 3 (September 19, 2025)	3	Polykarp Karpov	7	Moscow	"Пусть всегда будет солнце"	—	—	—
Episode 3 (September 19, 2025)	4	Veronika Shcherban	13	Moscow	"Выключи свет"	—	✔	✔
Episode 3 (September 19, 2025)	5	Damir Sorokin	13	Moscow	"Пожары"	—	—	—
Episode 3 (September 19, 2025)	6	Jacqueline Alekseeva	7	Moscow	"Padam, padam..."	✔	✔	✔
Episode 3 (September 19, 2025)	7	Kristina Myaz	13	Vladivostok	"Все не так просто"	—	✔	✔
Episode 3 (September 19, 2025)	8	Maxim Byorn	8	Khimki, Moscow Oblast	"Любите, девушки"	—	—	—
Episode 3 (September 19, 2025)	9	Anastasiya Bulatetskaya	15	Perm	"Lose Control"	✔	✔	✔
Episode 3 (September 19, 2025)	10	Zlata Uchaykina	14	Samara	"Небо славян"	—	—	✔
Episode 4 (Note: Dima Bilan is The best coach of episode 4.) (September 26, 2025)	1	Anna Tsaryova	6	Moscow	"Стою на полустаночке"	✔	—	✔
Episode 4 (September 26, 2025)	2	Dmitry Li-Chang-Lin	11	Moscow	"Беспризорник"	—	—	—
Episode 4 (September 26, 2025)	3	Lydiya Lakhtyukhova	12	Moscow	"Зимний сон"	✔	—	✔
Episode 4 (September 26, 2025)	4	Veronika Tarasova	15	Vladimir	"Встань"	✔	✔	✔
Episode 4 (September 26, 2025)	5	Stefan Gasparyan	7	Moscow	"Я люблю рок-н-ролл"	✔	—	—
Episode 4 (September 26, 2025)	6	Alika Beshtokova	15	Krasnodar	"Охота на лисицу"	—	—	—
Episode 4 (September 26, 2025)	7	Diana Bashilova	8	Odintsovo, Moscow Oblast	"Арлекино"	—	—	—
Episode 4 (September 26, 2025)	8	Arseniy Bardin	13	Mozhga, Udmurt Republic	"Дельтаплан"	—	—	✔
Episode 4 (September 26, 2025)	9	Malika Zeynalova	11	Moscow	"Оренбургский пуховый платок"	—	—	✔
Episode 4 (September 26, 2025)	10	Semyon Kashtanov	13	Voronezh	"Как молоды мы были"	✔	—	✔
Episode 5 (Note: Dima Bilan is The best coach of episode 5.) (October 3, 2025)	1	Joseppe Di Menca	11	Italy, Sicilia	"Caruso"	✔	✔	✔
Episode 5 (October 3, 2025)	2	Taisiya Litonina	9	Zelenograd	"Метелица"	✔	—	—
Episode 5 (October 3, 2025)	3	Vladimir Igolkin	10	Saint Petersburg	"Герои спорта"	—	—	—
Episode 5 (October 3, 2025)	4	Sultana-Mira Chorbadzhy	14	Tolyatti, Samara Oblast	"Белым снегом"	✔	✔	✔
Episode 5 (October 3, 2025)	5	Alexander Rudenko	8	Samara	"Щенок"	—	—	—
Episode 5 (October 3, 2025)	6	Eseniya Prozorova	14	Kurgan	"What a Wonderful World"	✔	✔	✔
Episode 5 (October 3, 2025)	7	Mariya Markova-Butyrskaya	8	Saint Petersburg	"Дельтаплан"	—	—	✔
Episode 5 (October 3, 2025)	8	Bogdan Tokar	13	Belgorod	"Le temps des cathédrales"	—	✔	✔
Episode 5 (October 3, 2025)	9	Saida Abdullina	10	Kazan	"Эх, Андрюша, нам ли быть в печали"	—	—	—
Episode 5 (October 3, 2025)	10	Arina Kovrigina	11	Kemerovo	"I Will Always Love You"	—	✔	✔
Episode 6 (Note: Dima Bilan is The best coach of episode 6.) (October 10, 2025)	1	Artur Zverovich	8	Mogilev, Belarus	"Очи чёрные"	—	✔	✔
Episode 6 (October 10, 2025)	2	Varvara Vinogradova	10	Saint Petersburg	"Sous le ciel de Paris"	—	—	—
Episode 6 (October 10, 2025)	3	Albert Ramazanov	14	Yekaterinburg	"Опера №2"	✔	✔	✔
Episode 6 (October 10, 2025)	4	Alina Archakova	14	Ryazan	"Знаешь ли ты"	✔	—	✔
Episode 6 (October 10, 2025)	5	David Yelan	13	Moscow	"Бах творит"	—	—	—
Episode 6 (October 10, 2025)	6	Anna Paramonova	11	Moscow	"Всё могут короли"	✔	—	—
Episode 6 (October 10, 2025)	7	Milana Ananko	9	Moscow	"Il mondo"	✔	—	✔
Episode 6 (October 10, 2025)	8	Pavel Tarasov	10	Samara	"Я счастливый"	—	—	—
Episode 6 (October 10, 2025)	9	Viktoriya Zakharova	10	Ryazan	"My Heart Will Go On"	✔	✔	✔
Episode 6 (October 10, 2025)	10	Dariya Nedelskaya	14	Moscow	"Я несла свою беду"	—	✔	✔
Episode 7 (Note: Dima Bilan is The best coach of episode 7.) (October 17, 2025)	1	Elizaveta Strikhar	8	Moscow	"Barbie Girl"	✔	—	✔
Episode 7 (October 17, 2025)	2	Stepan Smirnov	10	Tyumen	"Этот мир"	✔	—	—
Episode 7 (October 17, 2025)	3	Zhasmina Tuzelova	12	Astana, Kazakhstan	"Вою на Луну"	—	✔	✔
Episode 7 (October 17, 2025)	4	Demyan Kamaryan	14	Troitsk, Moscow	"Группа крови"	—	—	—
Episode 7 (October 17, 2025)	5	Darya Vaganova	15	Saint Petersburg	"Ритуальная"	✔	—	✔
Episode 7 (October 17, 2025)	6	Lev Pisanko	12	Moscow	"Espresso Macchiato"	✔	✔	✔
Episode 7 (October 17, 2025)	7	Elizaveta Moskvichyova	9	Krasnodar	"Замок из дождя"	—	—	—
Episode 7 (October 17, 2025)	8	Ilya Simbaev	14	Izhevsk	"На всю планету Земля"	—	✔	—
Episode 7 (October 17, 2025)	9	Viktoriya Ambrashkina	10	Moscow	"Ты — моё дыхание"	—	—	—
Episode 7 (October 17, 2025)	10	Kristina Vilyaeva	13	Moscow	"I Wish"	✔	✔	✔
Episode 8 (Note: Dima Bilan is The best coach of episode 8.) (October 24, 2025)	1	Alexandra Rozhkova	9	Penza	"Шутка"	✔	✔	✔
Episode 8 (October 24, 2025)	2	Bulat Malaev	13	Saratov	"Седая ночь"	—	—	—
Episode 8 (October 24, 2025)	3	Arina Kiyashko	14	Nizhnekamsk, Tatarstan	"Пообещайте мне любовь"	✔	—	✔
Episode 8 (October 24, 2025)	4	Margarita Zingman	10	Minsk, Belarus	"Tattoo"	—	✔	—
Episode 8 (October 24, 2025)	5	Prokhor Borisov	12	Moscow	"Не вставай на колени"	—	✔	✔
Episode 8 (October 24, 2025)	6	Mariya Nikulina	7	Stavropol	"Конь"	✔	Team full	—
Episode 8 (October 24, 2025)	7	Mark Petrosyan	13	Moscow	"If I Ain't Got You"	✔	✔	✔
Episode 8 (October 24, 2025)	8	Mariya Muzyka	13	Cherepovets, Vologda Oblast	"Останусь"	Team full	Team full	—
Episode 8 (October 24, 2025)	9	Anatoly Barbarenko	12	Kirov	"Оле, оле"	Team full	Team full	—
Episode 8 (October 24, 2025)	10	Tatyana Babelyuk	9	Novosibirsk	"Разноцветные ярмарки"	✔	✔	✔

== The Battles ==
The Battles round started with the first half of episode 9 and ended with the first half of episode 11 (broadcast on October 31, November 7, 14 2025). Contestants who win their battle will advance to the Playoff rounds.

Colour key

Artist won the Battle and advanced to the Sing-offs
Artist was eliminated

Episode	Coach	Order	Winner	Song	Losers	
Episode 9 (October 31, 2025)	Dima Bilan	1	Mariya Nikulina	"Хорошо бродить по свету"	Elizaveta Strikhar	Elizaveta Mikhaylova
Episode 9 (October 31, 2025)	Dima Bilan	2	Anita Petrosyan	"Umbrella"	Stepan Smirnov	Taisiya Litonina
Episode 9 (October 31, 2025)	Dima Bilan	3	Anna Paramonova	"Чип и Дэйл спешат на помощь"	Stefan Gasparyan	Alexandra Rozhkova
Episode 9 (October 31, 2025)	Dima Bilan	4	Lidiya Lakhtyukhova	"Солёное счастье"	Eseniya Prozorova	Sofiya Damarnatskaya
Episode 9 (October 31, 2025)	Dima Bilan	5	Matvey Didenko	"Острой бритвой"	Semyon Kashtanov	Lev Pisanko
Episode 9 (October 31, 2025)	Dima Bilan	6	Albert Ramazanov	"Will You Be There"	Sofya Nagalina	Alina Archakova
Episode 10 (November 7, 2025)	Vladimir Presnyakov & Natalia Podolskaya	1	Sofia Shishikina	"Мечта"	Artur Zverovich	Miron Zernov
Episode 10 (November 7, 2025)	Vladimir Presnyakov & Natalia Podolskaya	2	Matvey Yaitskiy	"Shake It Off"	Jaqueline Alekseeva	Prokhor Borisov
Episode 10 (November 7, 2025)	Vladimir Presnyakov & Natalia Podolskaya	3	Veronika Shcherban	"Недотрога"	Anastasiya Bulatetskaya	Christina Myaz'
Episode 10 (November 7, 2025)	Vladimir Presnyakov & Natalia Podolskaya	4	Zhasmina Tuzelova	"Beautiful Things"	Bogdan Belov	Margarita Zingman
Episode 10 (November 7, 2025)	Vladimir Presnyakov & Natalia Podolskaya	5	Veronika Tarasova	"Купалинка"	Sultana-Mira Chorbaji	Darya Nedelskaya
Episode 10 (November 7, 2025)	Vladimir Presnyakov & Natalia Podolskaya	6	Milana Krokhina	"Ясный мой свет"	Christina Vilyaeva	Ilya Simbaev
Episode 11 (November 14, 2025)	Aida Garifullina	1	Mariya Markova-Butyrskaya	"Abracadabra"	Alexandra Ryabikina	Tatyana Babelyuk
Episode 11 (November 14, 2025)	Aida Garifullina	2	Milana Ananko	"Русское поле" / "Ой, да степь широкая" / "Конь"	Darya Vaganova	Malika Zeynalova
Episode 11 (November 14, 2025)	Aida Garifullina	3	Viktoriya Zakharova	"Shackles (Praise You)"	Mark Petrosyan	Arina Kovrigina
Episode 11 (November 14, 2025)	Aida Garifullina	4	Bogdan Tokar	"Нежность моя"	Milina Khayrullina	Zlata Uchaykina
Episode 11 (November 14, 2025)	Aida Garifullina	5	Arina Kiyashko	"La La La"	Anna Tsaryova	Arseniy Bardin
Episode 11 (November 14, 2025)	Aida Garifullina	6	Joseppe Di Menca	"Любовь, похожая на сон"	Roman Zhuchkov	Makar Shcheglov

== The Sing-offs ==
The Sing-offs round started with the second half of episode 9 and ended with the second half of episode 11 (broadcast on October 31, November 7, 14 2025). Contestants who was saved by their coaches will advance to the Final.

Colour key

Artist was saved by his/her coach and advanced to the Final
Artist was eliminated but received the Comeback and advanced to the Live Extra round

Episode	Coach	Order	Artist	Song	Result
Episode 9 (October 31, 2025)	Dima Bilan	1	Mariya Nikulina	"Конь"	Advanced to the Live Extra round
Episode 9 (October 31, 2025)	Dima Bilan	2	Anita Petrosyan	"All By Myself"	Advanced to the Final
Episode 9 (October 31, 2025)	Dima Bilan	3	Anna Paramonova	"Всё могут короли"	Advanced to the Live Extra round
Episode 9 (October 31, 2025)	Dima Bilan	4	Lidiya Lakhtyukhova	"Зимний сон"	Advanced to the Live Extra round
Episode 9 (October 31, 2025)	Dima Bilan	5	Matvey Didenko	"Песня о далёкой Родине"	Advanced to the Final
Episode 9 (October 31, 2025)	Dima Bilan	6	Albert Ramazanov	"Опера №2"	Advanced to the Live Extra round
Episode 10 (November 7, 2025)	Vladimir Presnyakov & Natalia Podolskaya	1	Sofya Shishikina	"Yodel"	Advanced to Live Extra round
Episode 10 (November 7, 2025)	Vladimir Presnyakov & Natalia Podolskaya	2	Matvey Yaitskiy	"Алёшка" (Руки Вверх!)	Advanced to the Final
Episode 10 (November 7, 2025)	Vladimir Presnyakov & Natalia Podolskaya	3	Veronika Shcherban	"Выключи свет" (Наталья Подольская)	Advanced to the Live Extra round
Episode 10 (November 7, 2025)	Vladimir Presnyakov & Natalia Podolskaya	4	Jasmina Tuzelova	"Вою на Луну" (Нюша)	Advanced to the Final
Episode 10 (November 7, 2025)	Vladimir Presnyakov & Natalia Podolskaya	5	Veronika Tarasova	"Stand up"	Advanced to the Live Extra round
Episode 10 (November 7, 2025)	Vladimir Presnyakov & Natalia Podolskaya	6	Milana Krokhina	"Con te Partiro"/"Let's get it started"	Advanced to the Live Extra round
Episode 11 (November 14, 2025)	Aida Garifullina	1	Mariya Markova-Butyrskaya	"Полёт на дельтаплане"	Advanced to the Live Extra round
Episode 11 (November 14, 2025)	Aida Garifullina	2	Milana Ananko	"Il mondo"	Advanced to the Live Extra round
Episode 11 (November 14, 2025)	Aida Garifullina	3	Viktoriya Zakharova	"My Heart Will Go On"	Advanced to the Final
Episode 11 (November 14, 2025)	Aida Garifullina	4	Bogdan Tokar	"Le Temps des cathédrales"	Advanced to the Live Extra round
Episode 11 (November 14, 2025)	Aida Garifullina	5	Arina Kiyashko	"Пообещайте мне любовь"	Advanced to the Live Extra round
Episode 11 (November 14, 2025)	Aida Garifullina	6	Joseppe Di Menca	"Caruso"	Advanced to the Final

== Live shows ==
Colour key

Artist was saved by the Public's votes
Artist was eliminated

=== Week 1: Live Playoffs (November 21) ===
This season, each coach saved four artists who were eliminated in the Sing-offs. Playoff results were voted on in real time. Twelve artists sang live and nine of them were eliminated by the end of the night. Three saved artists advanced to the Final.

Episode	Coach	Order	Artist	Song	Public's vote	Result
Episode 12 (Note: Dima Bilan is The best coach of episode 12.) (21 November)
Episode 12 (21 November)	Vladimir Presnyakov & Natalia Podolskaya	1	Milana Krokhina	"Ой, цветет калина» / "Арии Дивы Плавалагуны"	38,6 %	Advanced
Episode 12 (21 November)	Vladimir Presnyakov & Natalia Podolskaya	2	Sofya Shishikina	"Фонари"	12,6 %	Eliminated
Episode 12 (21 November)	Vladimir Presnyakov & Natalia Podolskaya	3	Veronika Tarasova	"Летали"	14,8 %	Eliminated
Episode 12 (21 November)	Vladimir Presnyakov & Natalia Podolskaya	4	Veronika Shcherban	"Там нет меня"	34 %	Eliminated
Episode 12 (21 November)	Aida Garifullina	5	Milana Ananko	"Spente le Stelle"	37,2 %	Eliminated
Episode 12 (21 November)	Aida Garifullina	6	Bogdan Tokar	"Прямо по сердцу"	12 %	Eliminated
Episode 12 (21 November)	Aida Garifullina	7	Maria Markova-Butirskaya	"Журчат ручьи"	9,9 %	Eliminated
Episode 12 (21 November)	Aida Garifullina	8	Arina Kiyashko	"Вечная любовь"	40,9 %	Advanced
Episode 12 (21 November)	Dima Bilan	9	Maria Nikulina	"Вдоль по Питерской"	41,8 %	Advanced
Episode 12 (21 November)	Dima Bilan	10	Lydia Lakhtyukhova	"Я не твоя"	11,7 %	Eliminated
Episode 12 (21 November)	Dima Bilan	11	Albert Ramazanov	"Шёлк"	17,4 %	Eliminated
Episode 12 (21 November)	Dima Bilan	12	Anna Paramonova	"Живём мы что-то без азарта"	29,1 %	Eliminated

=== Week 2: Final (November 28) ===
In the final, the remaining three artists from each team sing for one place in the super final on his/her team. The public vote once again determines the outcome.

Episode	Coach	Order	Artist	Song	Public's vote	Result
Episode 13 (28 November)
Episode 13 (28 November)	Final					
Episode 13 (28 November)	Aida Garifullina	1	Arina Kiyashko	"Любовь настала"	42,5 %	Advanced to the final
Episode 13 (28 November)	Aida Garifullina	2	Joseppe Di Menca	"Любовь уставших лебедей"	32,5 %	Eliminated
Episode 13 (28 November)	Aida Garifullina	3	Viktoria Zakharova	"I Have Nothing"	25 %	Eliminated
Episode 13 (28 November)	Dima Bilan	4	Maria Nikulina	"Течёт река Волга"	52%	Advanced to the final
Episode 13 (28 November)	Dima Bilan	5	Anita Petrosyan	"Dle yaman" / "Воин и дракон"	16,8 %	Eliminated
Episode 13 (28 November)	Dima Bilan	6	Matvey Didenko	"Свой среди чужих, чужой среди своих"	31,2 %	Eliminated
Episode 13 (28 November)	Vladimir Presnyakov & Natalia Podolskaya	7	Milana Krokhina	"Снег"	36 %	Eliminated
Episode 13 (28 November)	Vladimir Presnyakov & Natalia Podolskaya	8	Matvey Yaitsky	"Капитан арктика"	19,2 %	Eliminated
Episode 13 (28 November)	Vladimir Presnyakov & Natalia Podolskaya	9	Zhasmina Tuzelova	"Прерванный полёт"	44,8 %	Advanced to the final
Episode 13 (28 November)	Super Final					
Episode 13 (28 November)	Aida Garifullina	1	Arina Kiyashko	"Адажио"	35,6 %	Runner-up
Episode 13 (28 November)	Dima Bilan	2	Maria Nikulina	"Зима"	44,4 %	Winner
Episode 13 (28 November)	Vladimir Presnyakov & Natalia Podolskaya	3	Zhasmina Tuzelova	"Крылатые качели"	20 %	Third place

== Best Coach ==
Colour key

- Best Coach
- Second place
- Third place
- Episode's Best Coach

Coach	Public's vote _{(per episode)}												Result	
Coach	The Blind Auditions								The Battles			LER.	Result	
Coach	#1	#2	#3	#4	#5	#6	#7	#8	#9	#10	#11	#12	Result	
Dima Bilan	49%	55%	47%	55%	50%	48%	52%	59%	In episodes 9-11, there was no voting for the Best Coach.			42%	51%	Best Coach
Aida Garifullina	19%	26%	30%	30%	35%	31%	32%	23%	In episodes 9-11, there was no voting for the Best Coach.			39%	29%	Second place
Vladimir Presnyakov & Natalia Podolskaya	32%	19%	23%	15%	15%	21%	16%	18%	In episodes 9-11, there was no voting for the Best Coach.			19%	20%	Third place
