= The Voice Kids (Russian TV series) season 11 =

The Voice Kids
- Season 11
- Presented by: Yana Churikova; Valya Karnaval
- Coaches: Dima Bilan; Yulianna Karaulova; Jony
- Winner: Vasily Igolkin
- Winning coach: Dima Bilan
- Runner-up: Said Galiullin

Release
- Original network: Channel One
- Original release: 6 September – 29 November 2024

Season chronology
- ← Previous; Season 10 Next → Season 12

The eleventh season of the Russian reality talent show The Voice Kids premiered on 6 September 2024 on Channel One. Yana Churikova returned as the show's presenters while Valya Karnaval replaced Agata Muceniece for the first time since 7th season. All three coaches from the previous season did not return. Former coach Dima Bilan replaced Basta while Yulianna Karaulova and Jony replaced MakSim and Egor Kreed.

Vasily Igolkin was announced the winner of this season, marking Dima Bilan's third win as a coach on The Voice Kids. With Igolkin's win, Bilan became the first coach on the Kids version of the show to win more than two seasons. In addition, Bilan also became the fourth coach out of all versions of the show to win three times, behind Alexander Gradsky, Pelageya and Polina Gagarina.

== Coaches and presenters ==
The Voice Kids season 11 coaches

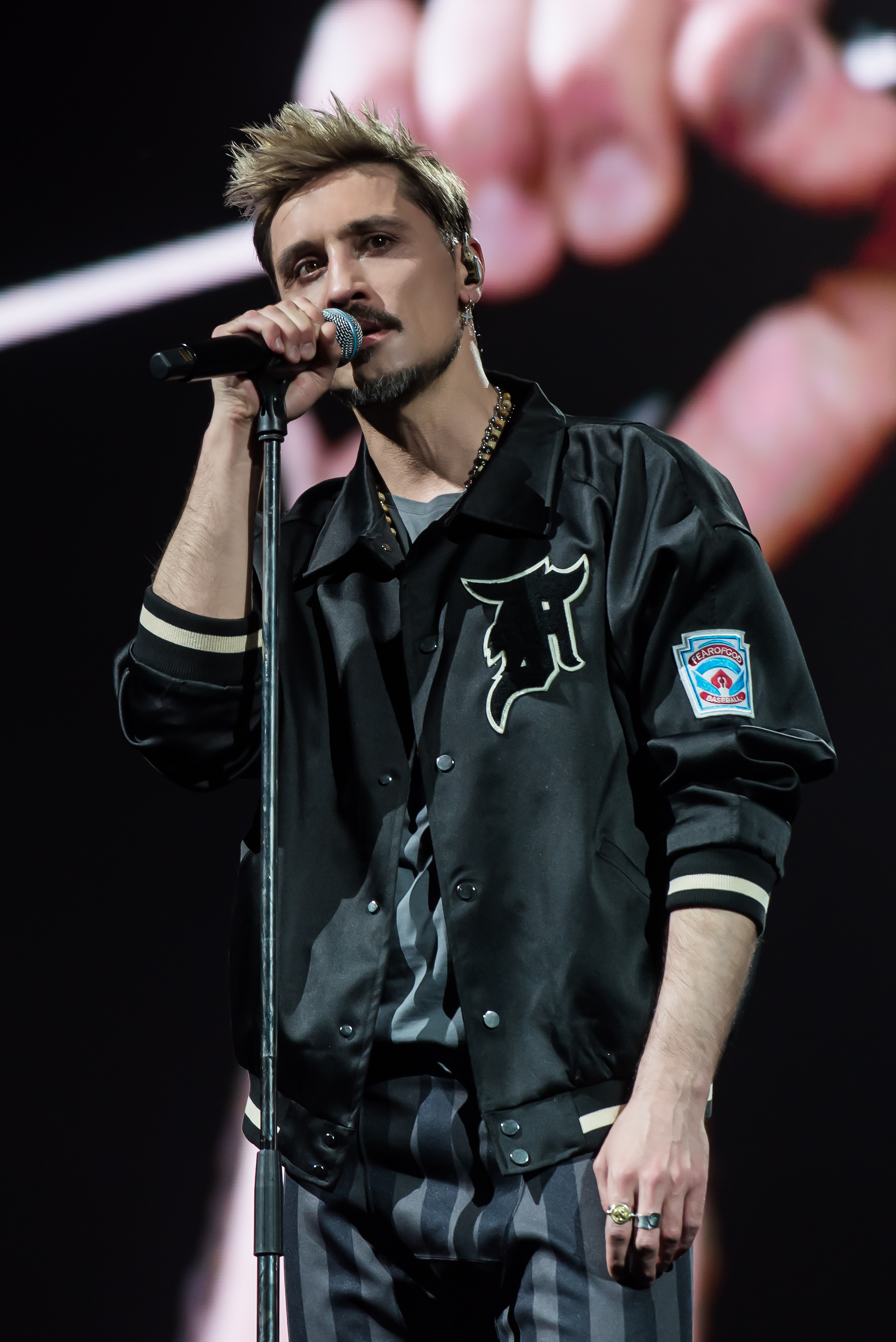
Dima Bilan

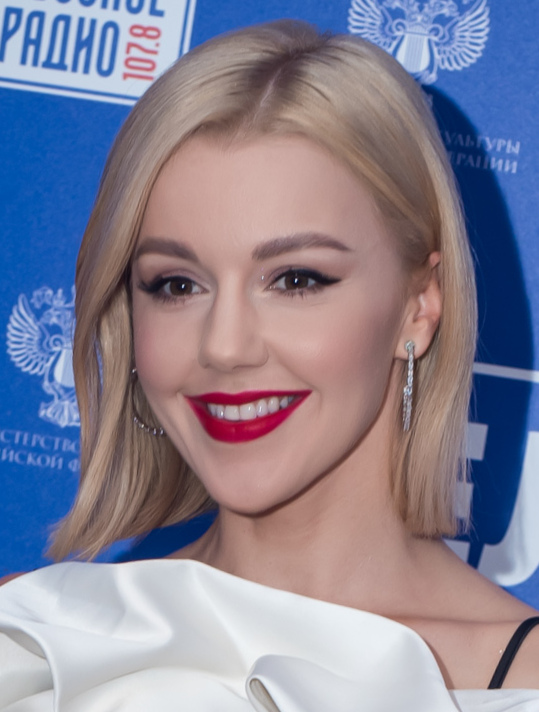
Yulianna Karaulova

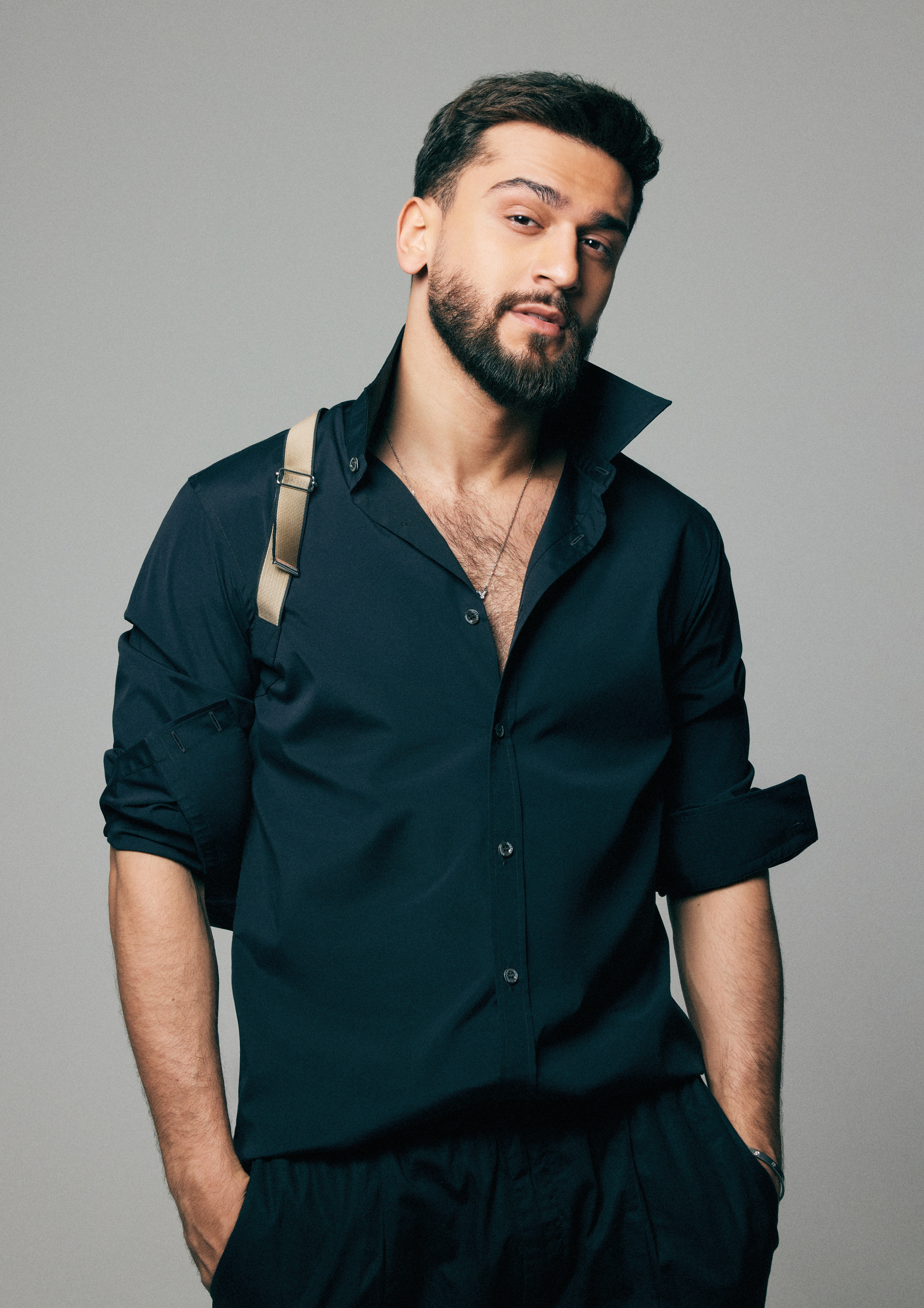
Jony

Dima Bilan returned as a coaches after 6 season break and was joined by Yulianna Karaulova and Jony.

Yana Churikova returned as a presenter while Valya Karnaval replaced Agata Muceniece.

== Teams ==
Colour key

- Winner
- Runner-up
- Third place
- Eliminated in the Final
- Eliminated in the Live Extra round
- Eliminated in the Battle rounds

Coaches	Top 45 artists				
Dima Bilan					
Dima Bilan	Vasily Igolkin	Grigory Druzhinin	Nelly Baimatova	Ekaterina Yakimova	Georgy Petrosyan
Dima Bilan	Erislav Sanakoev	Daniil Gladchenko	Alexandra Leonova	Eva Rodkina	Gleb Stasyuk
Dima Bilan	Violetta Abuzyarova	Egor Lysun	Rayana Ibatullina	Maria Kareeva	Ivan Gusev
Yulianna Karaulova					
Yulianna Karaulova	Arina Tochilova	Evelina Radbil	Roman Skrobot	Amalia Sukhan	Daria Kuzevanova
Yulianna Karaulova	Andrey Palaev	Elena Turchina	Arina Ruzmanova	Maxim Lokaychuk	Alexey Adamovich
Yulianna Karaulova	Daria Andriyanycheva	Kira Kulikova	Victoria Bolotskikh	Timofey Pedanov	Lev Solovyov
Jony					
Jony	Said Galiullin	Andrey Pribylsky	Anna Kukina	Alexandra Tatokhina	Alsu Ulukhanova
Jony	Vladimir Romanov	Alexander Maneshin	Grigory Shcherbina	Alisa Khanumyan	Anastasia Margieva
Jony	Zaur Baragunov	Emilia Amaryan	Roman Zubrinkin	Vasilisa Nesterova	Margarita Kosheleva
Note: Italicized names are stolen contestants (who were eliminated in the Sing-offs, but were stolen in the Live Extra round and advanced to the Final).

== Blind auditions ==
Colour key

✔	Coach pressed "I WANT YOU" button
✔	Coach pressed "I WANT YOU", despite the lack places in his/her team
	Artist defaulted to a coach's team
	Artist picked a coach's team
	Artist eliminated with no coach pressing their button

The coaches performed "Beggin'" at the start of the show.

Episode	Order	Artist	Age	Hometown	Song	Coach's and artist's choices		
Episode	Order	Artist	Age	Hometown	Song	Bilan	Karaulova	JONY
Episode 1 (Note: Dima Bilan is The best coach of episode 1.) (September 6)	1	Grigory Druzhinin	8	Moscow	"Дорогой длинною"	✔	✔	✔
Episode 1 (September 6)	2	Veronika Stepanova	14	Voronezh	"Музыка нас связала"	—	—	—
Episode 1 (September 6)	3	Roman Zubrinkin	8	Yoshkar-Ola	"Песенка крокодила Гены"	✔	✔	✔
Episode 1 (September 6)	4	Georgy Petrosyan	12	Moscow	"Per Te"	✔	✔	—
Episode 1 (September 6)	5	Ulyana Kotelnikova	10	Krasnoyarsk	"Гагарин"	—	—	—
Episode 1 (September 6)	6	Egor Lysun	7	Moscow	"Трасса Е-95"	✔	—	—
Episode 1 (September 6)	7	Daria Kuzevanova	10	Ekaterinburg	"Порушка-Параня" / "Стрелы"	—	✔	—
Episode 1 (September 6)	8	Erislav Sanakoev	12	Vladikavkaz	"Моя Москва"	✔	—	—
Episode 1 (September 6)	9	Alexandra Tatokhina	13	Moscow	"Desert Rose"	✔	✔	✔
Episode 2 (Note: Dima Bilan is The best coach of episode 2.) (September 13)	1	Daniil Gladchenko	6	Varenikovskaya, Krasnodar Krai	"Эскадрон"	✔	✔	✔
Episode 2 (September 13)	2	Kira Kulikova	11	Moscow	"Ты не такой"	—	✔	—
Episode 2 (September 13)	3	Vsevolod Fateev	9	Sarapul, Udmurtia	"Небо"	—	—	—
Episode 2 (September 13)	4	Anna Kukina	10	Moscow	"Голуби"	✔	✔	✔
Episode 2 (September 13)	5	Daniil Saridi	13	Moscow	"Отшумели летние дожди"	—	—	—
Episode 2 (September 13)	6	Violetta Abuzyarova	11	Moscow	"Hymne à l'amour"	✔	✔	—
Episode 2 (September 13)	7	Eva Rodkina	10	Vladivostok	"Дельтаплан"	✔	—	—
Episode 2 (September 13)	8	Andrey Palaev	12	Ivanovo	"Stayin' Alive"	—	✔	—
Episode 2 (September 13)	9	Grigory Shcherbina	6	Podolsk, Moscow Oblast	"Симона"	—	✔	✔
Episode 3 (Note: Dima Bilan is The best coach of episode 3.) (September 20)	1	Mariya Kareeva	8	Belgorod	"Матушка"	✔	✔	—
Episode 3 (September 20)	2	Maksim Lokaychuk	10	Goryachy Klyuch, Krasnodar Krai	"Там нет меня"	—	✔	—
Episode 3 (September 20)	3	Alexandra Kuznitsyna	11	Nizhny Novgorod	"Cambio Dolor"	—	—	—
Episode 3 (September 20)	4	Said Galiullin	12	Kazan	"Песенка Роберта"	✔	✔	✔
Episode 3 (September 20)	5	Margarita Kosheleva	12	Chelyabinsk	"Now's the Time"	—	—	✔
Episode 3 (September 20)	6	Roman Ore	14	Ramenskoye, Moscow Oblast	"В самое сердце"	—	—	—
Episode 3 (September 20)	7	Polina Yazykova	8	Moscow	"Песня Красной Шапочки"	—	—	—
Episode 3 (September 20)	8	Timofey Pedanov	11	Nizhny Novgorod	"Реченька"	—	✔	—
Episode 3 (September 20)	9	Alsu Ulukhanova	12	Almaty, Kazakhstan	"It's Raining Men"	—	✔	✔
Episode 4 (Note: Dima Bilan is The best coach of episode 4.) (September 27)
Episode 4 (September 27)	1	Adel Iskakova	12	Saint Petersburg	"Хоп хэй лала лэй"	—	—	—
Episode 4 (September 27)	2	Vladimir Romanov	7	Saint Petersburg	"Погоня"	—	—	✔
Episode 4 (September 27)	3	Evelina Radbil	11	Nizhny Novgorod	"Voilà"	✔	✔	✔
Episode 4 (September 27)	4	Alexander Maneshin	14	Kolomna, Moscow Oblast	"Дай ему сил"	—	—	✔
Episode 4 (September 27)	5	Sofiya Medvedeva	14	Moscow	"Love in the Dark"	—	—	—
Episode 4 (September 27)	6	Darya Andriyanycheva	13	Nizhny Novgorod	"Сама иду"	✔	✔	—
Episode 4 (September 27)	7	Marianna Yusupova	11	Moscow	"Хороший парень"	—	—	—
Episode 4 (September 27)	8	Andrey Pribylsky	11	Vladimir	"I Surrender"	✔	✔	✔
Episode 4 (September 27)	9	Amaliya Sukhan	12	Minsk, Belarus	"Питер — Владивосток"	—	✔	—
Episode 5 (Note: Dima Bilan is The best coach of episode 5.) (October 4)
Episode 5 (October 4)	1	Ekaterina Yakimova	6	Moscow	"Katyusha"	✔	✔	✔
Episode 5 (October 4)	2	Dmitry Yulinov	14	Vologda	"Всё в твоих руках"	—	—	—
Episode 5 (October 4)	3	Vasilisa Nesterova	14	Nizhny Novgorod	"Dernière danse"	—	✔	✔
Episode 5 (October 4)	4	Milina Berdnikova	12	Kamyshin	"Новый герой"	—	—	—
Episode 5 (October 4)	5	Ivan Gusev	11	Odintsovo, Moscow Oblast	"Let It Be"	✔	✔	✔
Episode 5 (October 4)	6	Alisa Khanumyan	12	Moscow	"Белая дверь"	—	—	✔
Episode 5 (October 4)	7	Alina Arakelyan	14	Saratov	"Проститься"	—	—	—
Episode 5 (October 4)	8	Roman Skrobot	8	Belgorod	"Highway to Hell"	—	✔	—
Episode 5 (October 4)	9	Viktoriya Bolotskikh	8	Moscow	"Осенний джаз"	✔	✔	—
Episode 6 (Note: Dima Bilan is The best coach of episode 6.) (October 11)
Episode 6 (October 11)	1	Nelly Baymatova	13	Kirov	"Кони привередливые"	✔	✔	✔
Episode 6 (October 11)	2	Zaur Baragunov	11	Nalchik	"Небо"	—	✔	✔
Episode 6 (October 11)	3	Emiliya Amaryan	14	Moscow	"Easy on Me"	—	—	✔
Episode 6 (October 11)	4	Grigory Budrik & Andrey Ivannikov	11 & 12	Tula	"Родина"	—	—	—
Episode 6 (October 11)	5	Alexandra Leonova	14	Vladimir	"Веселая кадриль"	✔	—	—
Episode 6 (October 11)	6	Vasily Igolkin	12	Saint Petersburg	"Этот большой мир"	✔	—	—
Episode 6 (October 11)	7	Arina Ruzmanova	8	Moscow	"Ванюша"	—	✔	—
Episode 6 (October 11)	8	Valeriya Gaponova	12	Lyubertsy, Moscow Oblast	"Белый снег"	—	—	—
Episode 6 (October 11)	9	Gleb Stasyuk	12	Brest, Belarus	"You Raise Me Up"	✔	✔	—
Episode 7 (Note: Dima Bilan is The best coach of episode 7.) (October 18)
Episode 7 (October 18)	1	Arina Tochilova	14	Yekaterinburg	"Блюз"	✔	✔	✔
Episode 7 (October 18)	2	Dmitry Ilyin	7	Zvenigorod	"Вася"	—	—	—
Episode 7 (October 18)	3	Elena Turchina	11	Saint Petersburg	"Ты не целуй"	—	✔	✔
Episode 7 (October 18)	4	Alia Ismailova	14	Vladivostok	"Продлись, счастье"	—	—	—
Episode 7 (October 18)	5	Alexey Adamovich	9	Saint Petersburg	"Runaway Baby"	✔	✔	✔
Episode 7 (October 18)	6	Anastasia Margieva	11	Moscow	"Rise Up"	✔	—	✔
Episode 7 (October 18)	7	Rayana Ibatullina	12	Kazan	"Мадонна"	✔	—	Team full
Episode 7 (October 18)	8	Olga Shestakova	11	Moscow	"Генералам 1812 года"	Team full	—	Team full
Episode 7 (October 18)	9	Lev Solovyov	9	Moscow	"Despacito"	Team full	✔	Team full

== The Battles ==
The Battles began on October 25, 2024. Contestants who won their battle advanced to the Sing-off rounds. Team Dima performed the first week, Team Yulianna performed the second week, and Team JONY performed the third week.

Colour key

Artist won the Battle and advanced to the Sing-offs
Artist was eliminated

Episode	Coach	Order	Winner	Song	Losers	
Episode 8 (October 25)	Dima Bilan	1	Vasily Igolkin	"Прекрасное далеко"	Erislav Sanakoev	Violetta Abuzyarova
Episode 8 (October 25)	Dima Bilan	2	Georgy Petrosyan	"Любовь уставших лебедей"	Gleb Stasyuk	Ivan Gusev
Episode 8 (October 25)	Dima Bilan	3	Grigory Druzhinin	"Буратино"	Daniil Gladchenko	Egor Lysun
Episode 8 (October 25)	Dima Bilan	4	Ekaterina Yakimova	"Песня о маме"	Eva Rodkina	Maria Kareeva
Episode 8 (October 25)	Dima Bilan	5	Nelly Baimatova	"Один в поле воин"	Rayana Ibatullina	Alexandra Leonova
Episode 9 (November 2)	Yulianna Karaulova	1	Roman Skrobot	"Шоколадка"	Victoria Bolotskikh	Arina Ruzmanova
Episode 9 (November 2)	Yulianna Karaulova	2	Amalia Sukhan	"Отшумели летние дожди"	Timofey Pedanov	Maxim Lokaychuk
Episode 9 (November 2)	Yulianna Karaulova	3	Evelina Radbil	"Ветер меняет направление"	Kira Kulikova	Elena Turchina
Episode 9 (November 2)	Yulianna Karaulova	4	Daria Kuzevanova	"На Титанике"	Alexey Adamovich	Lev Solovyov
Episode 9 (November 2)	Yulianna Karaulova	5	Arina Tochilova	"Зима в сердце"	Daria Andriyanycheva	Andrey Palaev
Episode 10 (November 8)	JONY	1	Anna Kukina	"Комета"	Roman Zubrinkin	Grigory Shcherbina
Episode 10 (November 8)	JONY	2	Andrey Pribylsky	"Серенада Трубадура"	Emilia Amaryan	Alexander Maneshin
Episode 10 (November 8)	JONY	3	Said Galiullin	"Крылатые качели"	Zaur Baragunov	Vladimir Romanov
Episode 10 (November 8)	JONY	4	Alexandra Tatokhina	"Lovely"	Vasilisa Nesterova	Alisa Khanumyan
Episode 10 (November 8)	JONY	5	Alsu Ulukhanova	"Si Ai"	Margarita Kosheleva	Anastasia Margieva

== The Sing-offs ==
The Sing-offs started on October 25. Contestants who were saved by their coaches advanced to the Final.

Colour key

Artist was saved by his/her coach and advanced to the Final
Artist was eliminated but received the Comeback and advanced to the Live Playoffs

Episode	Coach	Order	Artist	Song	Result
Episode 8 (October 25)	Dima Bilan	1	Vasily Igolkin	"Этот большой мир"	Advanced
Episode 8 (October 25)	Dima Bilan	2	Georgy Petrosyan	"Per Te"	Received the Comeback
Episode 8 (October 25)	Dima Bilan	3	Grigory Druzhinin	"Дорогой длинной"	Received the Comeback
Episode 8 (October 25)	Dima Bilan	4	Ekaterina Yakimova	"Катюша"	Received the Comeback
Episode 8 (October 25)	Dima Bilan	5	Nelly Baimatova	"Кони привередливые"	Advanced
Episode 9 (November 2)	Yulianna Karaulova	1	Roman Skrobot	"Highway to Hell"	Received the Comeback
Episode 9 (November 2)	Yulianna Karaulova	2	Amalia Sukhan	"Питер-Владивосток"	Received the Comeback
Episode 9 (November 2)	Yulianna Karaulova	3	Evelina Radbil	"Voilà"	Advanced
Episode 9 (November 2)	Yulianna Karaulova	4	Daria Kuzevanova	"Порушка-Параня" / "Стрелы"	Received the Comeback
Episode 9 (November 2)	Yulianna Karaulova	5	Arina Tochilova	"Блюз"	Advanced
Episode 10 (November 8)	JONY	1	Anna Kukina	"Голуби"	Advanced
Episode 10 (November 8)	JONY	2	Andrey Pribylsky	"I Surrender"	Advanced
Episode 10 (November 8)	JONY	3	Said Galiullin	"Песенка Роберта"	Received the Comeback
Episode 10 (November 8)	JONY	4	Alexandra Tatokhina	"Desert Rose"	Received the Comeback
Episode 10 (November 8)	JONY	5	Alsu Ulukhanova	"It's Raining Men"	Received the Comeback

== Live shows ==
Colour key

Artist was saved by the Public's votes
Artist was eliminated

=== Week 1: Live Playoffs (November 15) ===
Identical to the previous season, each coach saved three artists who were eliminated in the Sing-offs. Playoff results were voted on in real time. Nine artists sang live and six of them were eliminated by the end of the night. Three saved artists advanced to the Final.

Episode	Coach	Order	Artist	Song	Public's vote	Result
Episode 11 (November 15) (Note: Dima Bilan is The best coach of episode 11.)	JONY	1	Said Galiullin	"Smuglyanka"	59,3%	Advanced
Episode 11 (November 15)	JONY	2	Alsu Ulukhanova	"Не брошу на полпути"	4,2%	Eliminated
Episode 11 (November 15)	JONY	3	Alexandra Tatokhina	"Mon amour"	36,3%	Eliminated
Episode 11 (November 15)	Dima Bilan	4	Grigory Druzhinin	"Разговор со счастьем"	39,9%	Advanced
Episode 11 (November 15)	Dima Bilan	5	Georgy Petrosyan	"Thriller"	30,1%	Eliminated
Episode 11 (November 15)	Dima Bilan	6	Ekaterina Yakimova	"Кабы не было зимы"	30%	Eliminated
Episode 11 (November 15)	Yulianna Karaulova	7	Roman Skrobot	"У тебя есть я"	41,4%	Advanced
Episode 11 (November 15)	Yulianna Karaulova	8	Daria Kuzevanova	"Кометы"	29,6%	Eliminated
Episode 11 (November 15)	Yulianna Karaulova	9	Amalia Sukhan	"Внеорбитные"	29%	Eliminated

=== Week 2: Final (29 November) ===
In the final, the remaining three artists from each team sing for one place in the super final on his/her team. The public vote once again determines the outcome. At the end of the episode, Vasily Igolkin was crowned the winner, marking Dima Bilan's third win as a coach.

Episode	Coach	Order	Artist	Song	Public's vote	Result
Episode 12 (29 November)
Episode 12 (29 November)	Final					
Episode 12 (29 November)	Yulianna Karaulova	1	Roman Skrobot	"Полёт на дельтаплане"	33,3%	Eliminated
Episode 12 (29 November)	Yulianna Karaulova	2	Arina Tochilova	"Ты же выжил,солдат"	35,4%	Advanced
Episode 12 (29 November)	Yulianna Karaulova	3	Evelina Radbil	"A Million Voices"	31,3%	Eliminated
Episode 12 (29 November)	Dima Bilan	4	Vasily Igolkin	"Cranes"	51,9%	Advanced
Episode 12 (29 November)	Dima Bilan	5	Nelly Baimatova	"Не отрекаются любя"	27,7%	Eliminated
Episode 12 (29 November)	Dima Bilan	6	Grigory Druzhinin	"Я шагаю по Москве"	23,4%	Eliminated
Episode 12 (29 November)	JONY	7	Andrey Pribylsky	"Лебединая верность"	36,7%	Eliminated
Episode 12 (29 November)	JONY	8	Anna Kukina	"Потерянный рай"	16,8%	Eliminated
Episode 12 (29 November)	JONY	9	Said Galiullin	"Беловежская пуща"	46,5%	Advanced
Episode 12 (29 November)	Super Final					
Episode 12 (29 November)	Yulianna Karaulova	1	Arina Tochilova	"Ветер перемен"	13,2%	Third place
Episode 12 (29 November)	Dima Bilan	2	Vasily Igolkin	"Синяя вечность"	45,3%	Winner
Episode 12 (29 November)	JONY	3	Said Galiullin	"Берёзовые сны"	42,5%	Runner-up

Non-competition performances
Performer	Song
Vasily Igolkin (winner)	"Этот большой мир"

== Special Episode: "The Voice Kids is a Fantastic!" (22 November) ==
In this episode, the finalists were performing in duos with avatars that were carried from another show by Channel One: "Fantastika", and coaches were trying to guess, who hides in avatars. The episode was hosted by Yana Churikova and Vadim Galygin. The episode was created in collaboration with Soyuzmultfilm.

Colour key

The Best Number (by Viewers and Juries)

Episode	Coach	Order	Artist	Character	Song	Result	Personality
Episode 12 (November 22)	JONY	1	Anna Kukina	Umka	"Колыбельная медведицы"	Guessed	Pelageya
Episode 12 (November 22)	Dima Bilan	2	Grigory Druzhinin	Fröken Bock	"Эй вы там, наверху"	Guessed	Anastasia Spiridonova
Episode 12 (November 22)	Yulianna Karaulova	3	Arina Tochilova	Troubadour	"Луч солнца золотого"	Guessed	Sergey Volchkov
Episode 12 (November 22)	Dima Bilan	4	Nelly Baimatova	Shapoklyak	"Holding Out for a Hero"	Guessed	Polina Gagarina
Episode 12 (November 22)	Dima Bilan	5	Vasily Igolkin	Vodyanoy	"Дожди"	Guessed	Igor Kornelyuk
Episode 12 (November 22)	Yulianna Karaulova	6	Roman Skrobot	Baby Si	"Бьёт бит"	Did not guessed	Alisa Kozhikina
Episode 12 (November 22)	Yulianna Karaulova	7	Evelina Radbil	Atamansha	"Песня Атаманши"	Guessed	Larisa Dolina
Episode 12 (November 22)	JONY	8	Andrey Pribylsky	Boniface	"Circle of Life"	Guessed	Aleksandr Panayotov
Episode 12 (November 22)	JONY	9	Said Galliulin	Gromozeka	"Трава у дома"	Guessed	Sergey Zhilin

== Best Coach ==
Colour key

- Best Coach
- Second place
- Third place
- Episode's Best Coach

Coach	Public's vote _{(per episode)}									Result
Coach	#1	#2	#3	#4	#5	#6	#7	#11	Av.	Result
Dima Bilan	58%	58%	60%	44%	53%	56%	54%	45%	52%	Best coach
Yulianna Karaulova	25%	25%	24%	28%	27%	25%	27%	23%	26%	Second place
Jony	17%	17%	16%	28%	20%	19%	19%	32%	22%	Third place
