= HammAli & Navai =

Azerbaijani hookah rap duo

- Origin: Moscow, Russia
- Genres: Hookah rap; Pop rap
- Years active: 2016–2025
- Labels: Atlantic Records Russia, Lotus Music
- Past members: HammAli (Alexander Gromov), Navai (Navai Bakirov)

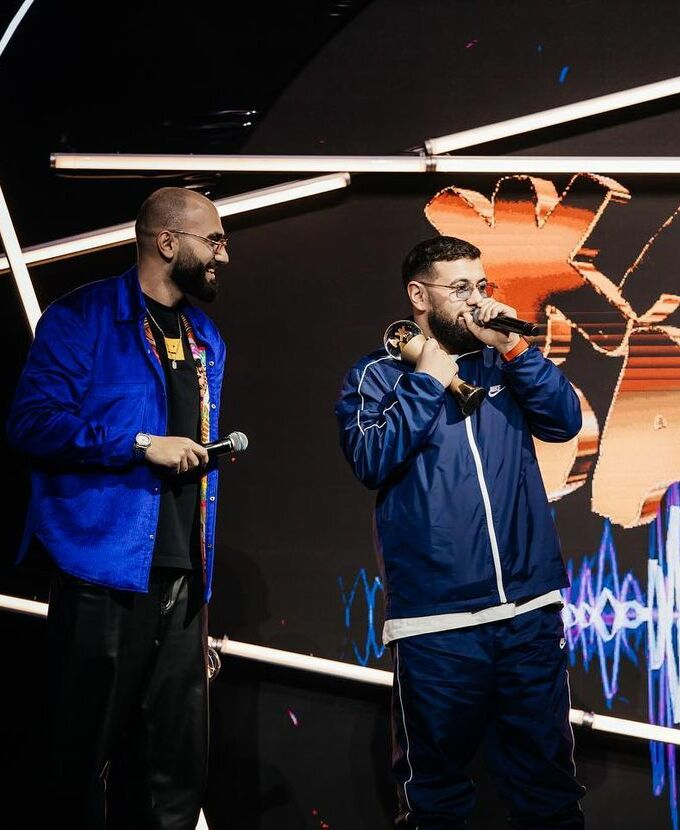
HammAli & Navai на «ЖАРА Music Awards 2022»

HammAli & Navai is an Azerbaijani hookah rap duo consisting of Alexander Gromov (née Aliyev) and Navai Bakirov. The group formed in 2016.

== History ==
The duo released their first song «День в календаре» on 29 June 2016.

In January 2017, they released two songs: «Летать не хочу» and «Любовь-простуда». A month later, they released the song «Ты моя химия», and the month following, they released the song «Память не разрушить».

On April 19, 2017, they released their song «Вместе летать», which features Bahh Tee. In May of that year, they released the song «Привет, ну как ты там вообще?». On 16 June they released the song «Фары-Туманы». On 4 July they released the track «Закрываю глаза» with Джоззи.

In 2018 they released the song «Хочешь, я к тебе приеду» that later came with a music video, which was shot by Nastya Ivleeva. On 9 March 2018 they released their debut studio album JANAVI, which became the most listened to album that year, according to the chart "BOOM". The song «Пустите меня на танцпол» was a hit (which charted on "Zvuk" (at #2), Mooscle (at #2), YouTube (at #5) and others.), a video was shot, with the rapper Kievstoner and blogger Maria Minogarova. On 26 November the album «JANAVI: Аутотомия» was released.

From 2020 to the start of 2021 both HammAli and Navai began to create music individually. In 2020 HammAli released a song with Mari Kraimbrery, and Navai released a series of singles that same year.

On 4 March 2021 the duo announced they would be moving ahead with solo careers. However, by the summer of 2021 they began making joint songs again.

== Discography ==
External videos
- YouTube • «Пустите меня на танцпол»
- YouTube • «Не люби меня»

=== Albums ===
Year	Name	Details
2018	«JANAVI»	Released: 9 March 2018; Format: Music Download; Label: JANAVI rec. / Siyah Music
2018	«JANAVI: Аутотомия»	Released: 26 November 2018; Format: Music Download; Label: Zhara Music
2021	«Когда хорошему человеку плохо»	Released: 1 April 2021; Format: Music Download; Label: Atlantic Records Russia

==== Solo albums ====
Year	Name	Details
2020	«Три песни»	Released: 2 October 2020; Format: Music download; Label: Zhara Music

=== Singles ===
- 2016 — «День в календаре»
- 2017 — «Летать не хочу»
- 2017 — «Любовь-простуда»
- 2017 — «Ты моя химия»
- 2017 — «Память не разрушить»
- 2017 — «Вместе летать» (feat. Bahh Tee)
- 2017 — «Привет, ну как ты там вообще?»
- 2017 — «Фары-Туманы»
- 2017 — «Закрываю глаза» (with Джоззи)
- 2018 — «Ноты»
- 2018 — «Хочешь, я к тебе приеду»
- 2018 — «Цветок»
- 2018 — «Пустите меня на танцпол»
- 2018 — «Мама»
- 2019 — «Как тебя забыть»
- 2019 — «Девочка — война»
- 2019 — «Без тебя я не я» (with JONY)
- 2019 — «Прятки»
- 2019 — «Я закохався» (with Misha Marvin)
- 2020 — «Не люби меня»
- 2020 — «Где ты была?»
- 2020 — «Жить, не думая о тебе» (with Bahh Tee)
- 2020 — «Ну почему?» (with Emin)
- 2020 — «А если это любовь?»
- 2020 — «Девочка танцуй» (cover of song by Artik & Asti)
- 2021 — «Птичка»
- 2021 — «У окна»
- 2021 — «Последний поцелуй» (with Руки Вверх)
- 2021 — «Бриллианты VVS» (with Slava Marlow)
- 2021 — «Боже как завидую» (with Jah Khalib)
- 2021 — «Она хочет быть моделью» (with Macan)
- 2022 — «Любить это так бесполезно»
- 2023 — «Засыпай, красавица»
- 2023 — «Засыпаешь, но не со мной» (with Еgor Kreed)
- 2023 — «Где ты теперь и с кем» (with Basta)
- 2019 — «Ни приму и даром» (Navai feat. Bahh Tee)
- 2019 — «Любимая песня» (HammAli feat. Loc-Dog)
- 2020 — «Эгоист» — Navai
- 2020 — «На что мы тратим жизнь?» — HammAli
- 2020 — «Медляк» (HammAli feat. Mari Kraimbrery)
- 2020 — «Просто разговор» (HammAli feat. Loc-Dog)
- 2020 — «Зачем ты врёшь?» — Navai
- 2020 — «Чёрный мерен» — Navai
- 2020 — «Милая моя» (Navai feat. Ellai)
- 2021 — «Наверно ты меня не помнишь» (HammAli feat. JONY)
- 2022 — «Не плачь, не реви» (HammAli feat. Ellai)
- 2023 — «Баю-Бай» (HammAli feat. Timati)
- 2023 — «В чёрных очках» (HammAli feat. Mari Kraimbrery)

==== Featured on other albums ====
- JONY — «Список твоих мыслей» («Без тебя я не я»)
- Egor Kreed — «58» («Мне всё Монро»)
- Hann & Navai — «Hann» («Магнит»)
- Bahh Tee & Navai — «10 лет спустя» («Не читайте переписки»), HammAli & Navai («Жить, не думая о тебе»)
- The Limba & Andro & Navai — «Anima» («Никаких эмоций»)
- JONY & HammAli — «Не ищите во мне жанры» («Наверно, ты меня не помнишь»)

=== Videoclips ===
Video	Release year
Вместе летать	2017
Хочешь, я к тебе приеду	2018
Пустите меня на танцпол	2018
Девочка — война	2019
А если это любовь?	2020
Птичка	2022
Где ты теперь и с кем	2023
Singles	Release year
Эгоист	2020
Наверно ты меня не помнишь	2021
Баю-Бай	2023

== Awards and nominations ==
Year	Organization	Nomination	Results	References
2019	Премия RU.TV	A powerful start	Nominated	
2020	Новое Радио Awards	Best Group	Won	
