= The Voice Kids (Russian TV series) season 10 =

The Voice Kids
- Season 10
- Presented by: Yana Churikova; Agata Muceniece
- Coaches: Basta; MakSim; Egor Kreed
- Winner: Anna Dorovskaya
- Winning coach: Basta
- Runner-up: Milana Ponomarenko

Release
- Original network: Channel One
- Original release: 2 December 2022 – 22 February 2023

Season chronology
- ← Previous; Season 9 Next → Season 11

The tenth season of the Russian reality talent show The Voice Kids premiered in December 2022 on Channel One. Agata Muceniece returned as the show's presenter while Yana Churikova replaced Dmitry Nagiev for the first time in the shows history. Basta and Egor Kreed returned as coaches and were joined by MakSim, who replaced Polina Gagarina as a new coach. Anna Dorovskaya was announced the winner of this season, marking Basta's second win as a coach on The Voice Kids.

== Coaches and presenters ==
The Voice Kids season 10 coaches

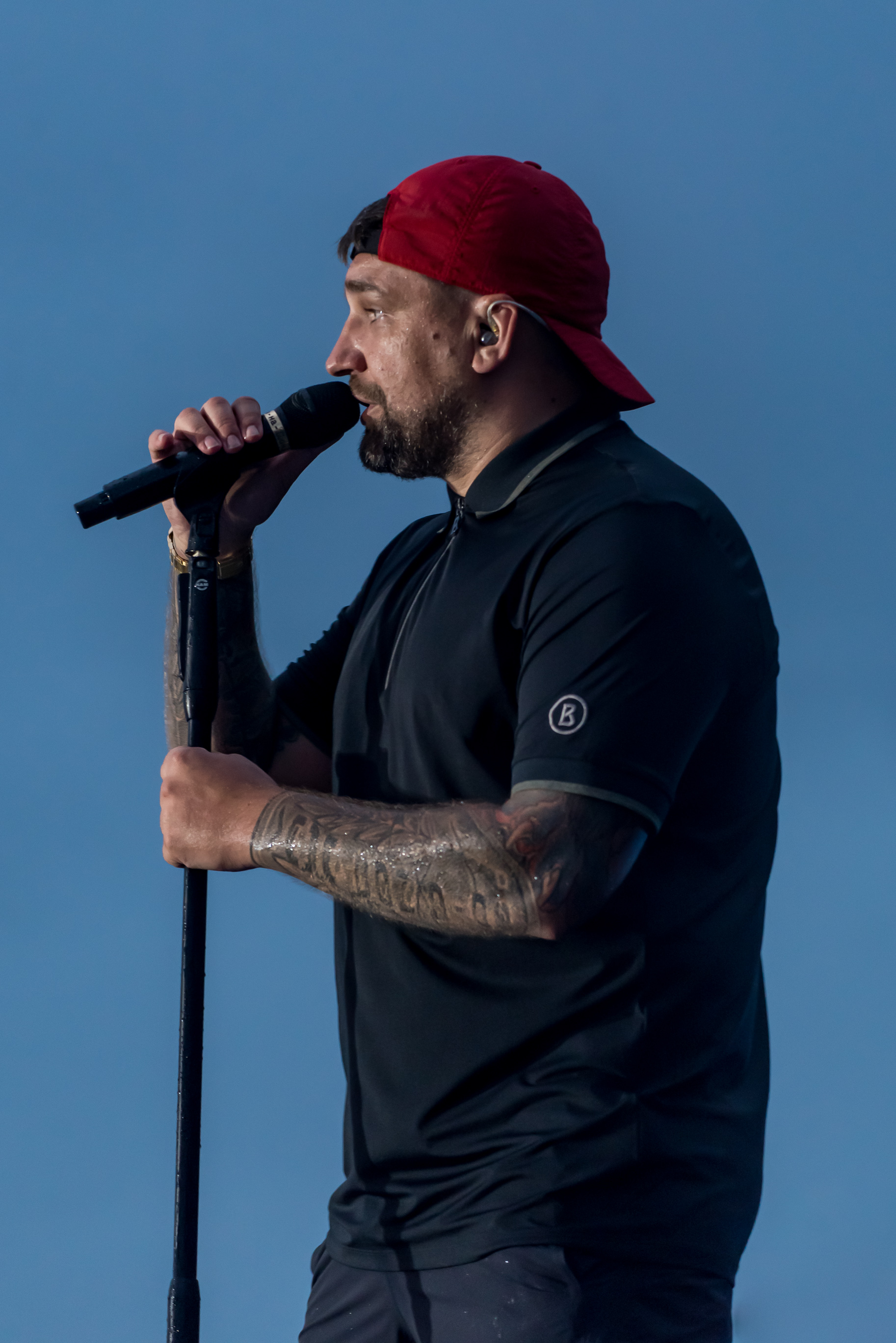
Basta

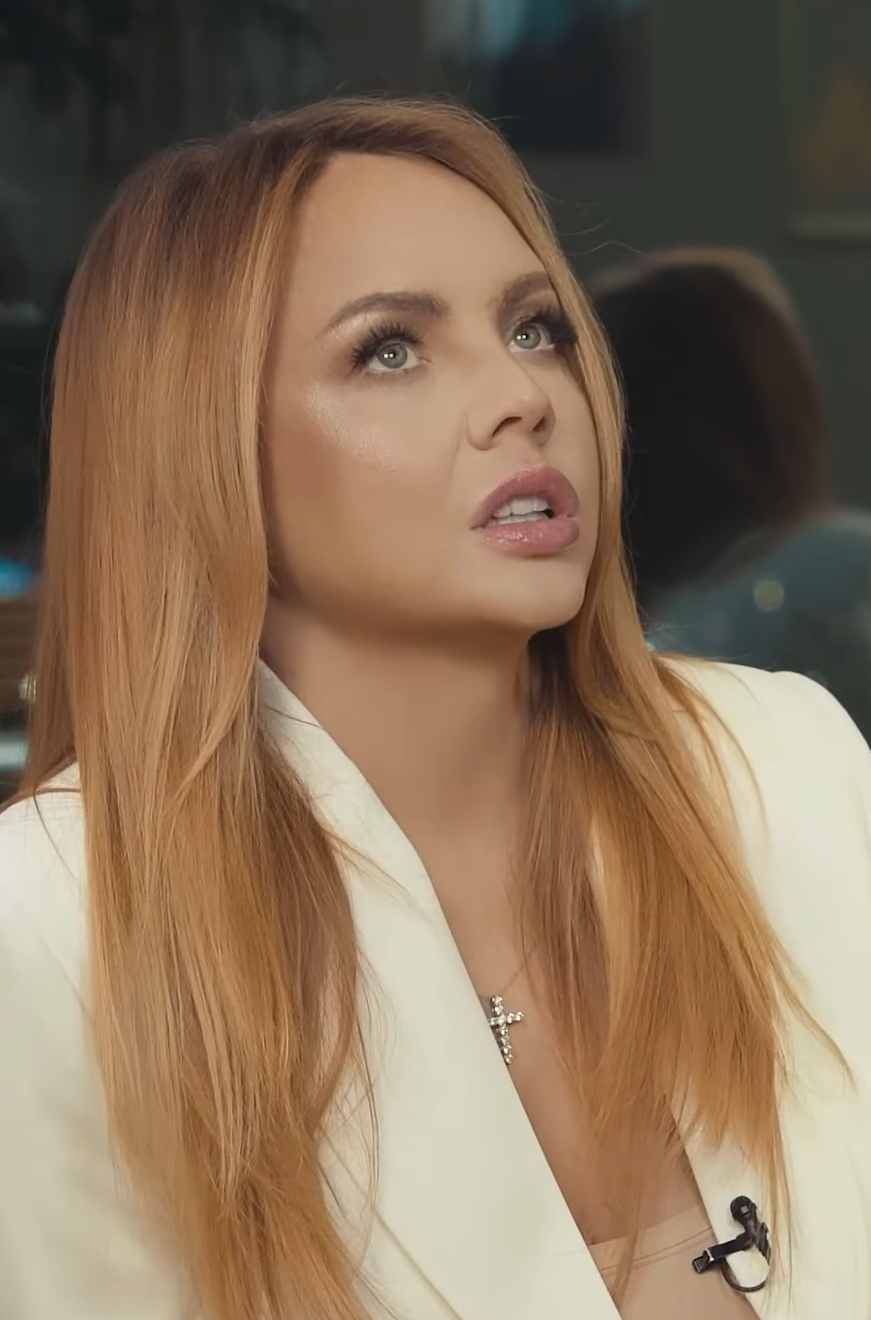
MakSim

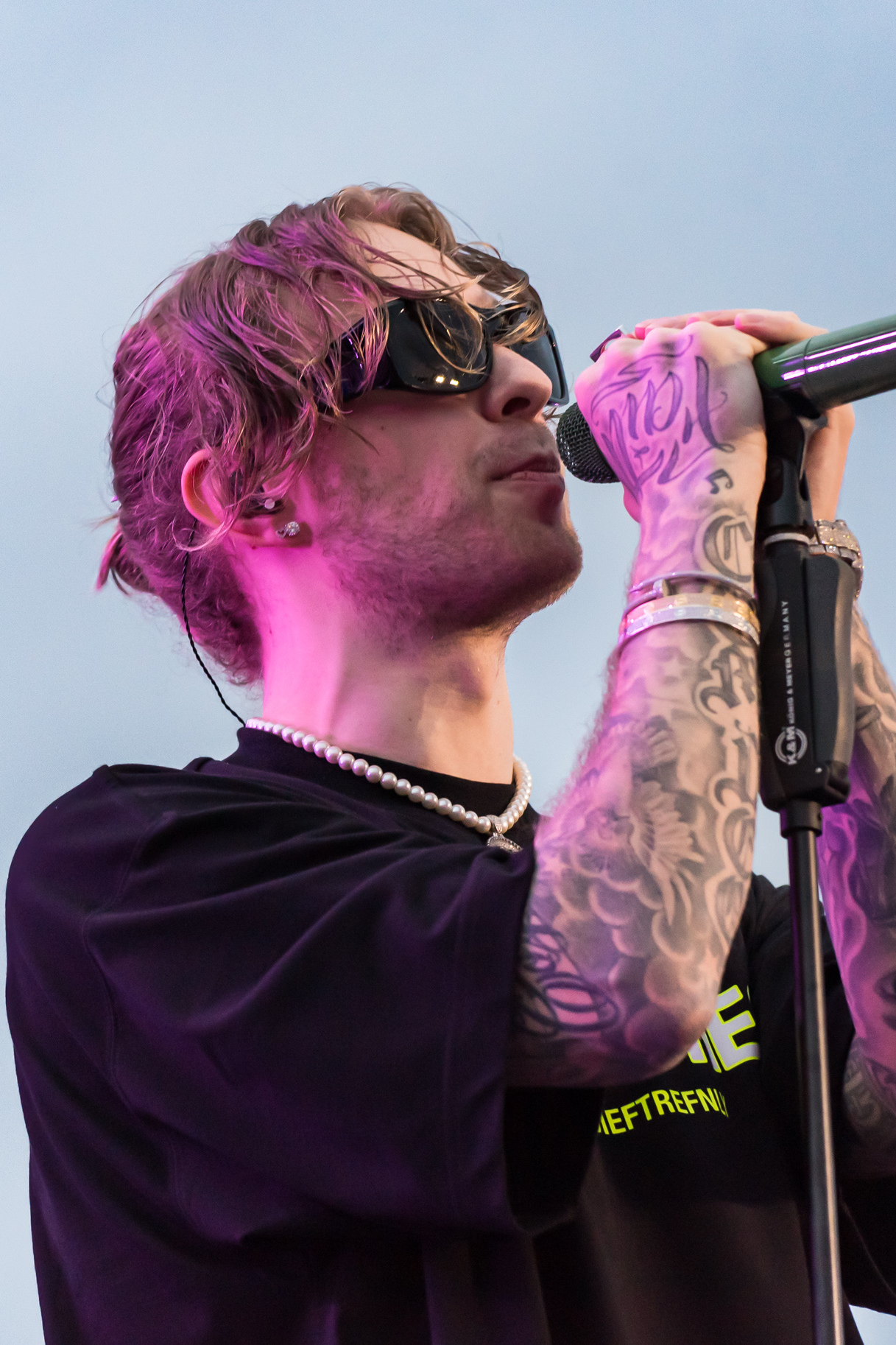
Egor Kreed

Basta and Egor Kreed returned as coaches and were joined by Maksim, who became a new coach.

Agata Muceniece returned as the show's presenter and Yana Churikova replaced Dmitry Nagiev.

== Teams ==
Colour key

- Winner
- Runner-up
- Third place
- Eliminated in the Final
- Eliminated in the Live Playoffs
- Eliminated in the Battle rounds

Coaches	Top 45 artists				
Basta					
Basta	Anna Dorovskaya	Konstantin Gorishnyakov	Ivan Rogunov	Syuy Mokhan	Mariam Darsaniya
Basta	Kamill Obukhov	Amelia Kolpakova	Maxim Ovchinnikov	Eva Avetisyan	Andrey Avanesov
Basta	Maria Tikhonova	Yaroslava Balakhmatova	Maria Bratchikova	Alena Yakovleva	Maksim Khrulyov
MakSim					
MakSim	Pavel Zilyov	Lev Smirnov	Marianna Ayrapetyants	Sofya Pavlova	Stefania Kovalenko
MakSim	Nikita Panov	Sofia Kiselyova	Alexey Teltsov	Ekaterina Ivanova	Zakhar Bobylyov
MakSim	Dmitry Minin	Darya Punchenko	Sofia Fadeeva	Evdokia Sergeeva	Kirill Usov
Egor Kreed					
Egor Kreed	Milana Ponomarenko	Denis Makarov	Sofya Singkh	Firdavs Avezov	Avrora Pozdnyakova
Egor Kreed	Danil Klyuzhin	Georgy Taburkin	Polina Ponomaryova	Nikita Danko	Alina Shamukova
Egor Kreed	Andrey Drobyshev	Olga Kosareva & Elina Nigmatullina	Shandor Silantyev	Anna Roginskaya	Andrey Emelin
Note: Italicized names are artists who received the Comeback and advanced to the Final.

== Blind Auditions ==
Blind auditions started on 9 December 2022. As like previous season, each coach has to complete its team with fifteen contestants. The coaches performed "Сансара" at the start of the show.

✔	Coach pressed "I WANT YOU" button
✔	Coach pressed "I WANT YOU" button, even though his/her team was already full
	Artist defaulted to a coach's team
	Artist picked a coach's team
	Artist eliminated as no coach pressing their button

Episode	Order	Artist	Age	Hometown	Song	Coach's and artist's choices		
Episode	Order	Artist	Age	Hometown	Song	Basta	MakSim	Kreed
Episode 1 (Note: Basta is The best coach of episode 1.) (9 December)	1	Stefania Kovalenko	11	Ussuriysk, Primorsky Kray	«Отпускаю» / «Комета»	✔	✔	✔
Episode 1 (9 December)	2	Lev Smirnov	10	Izhevsk	«Я буду помнить»	✔	✔	—
Episode 1 (9 December)	3	Evdokia Sergeeva	6	Moscow	«Песня царевны Забавы»	—	✔	—
Episode 1 (9 December)	4	Maxim Ovchinnikov	12	Sevastopol, Ukraine	«Дорогой длинною»	✔	—	—
Episode 1 (9 December)	5	Alina Shamukova	14	Moscow	«Love on Top»	✔	✔	✔
Episode 1 (9 December)	6	Alexander Konovalov	7	Moscow	«Ёжик резиновый»	—	—	—
Episode 1 (9 December)	7	Eva Avetisyan	11	Barnaul	«Любовь настала»	✔	✔	✔
Episode 1 (9 December)	8	Alyona Karpukhina	13	Moscow	«Life»	—	—	—
Episode 1 (9 December)	9	Alexey Teltsov	14	Tver	«Besame Mucho»	—	✔	—
Episode 2 (Note: Basta is The best coach of episode 2.) (16 December)	1	Pavel Zilov	8	Krasnoyarsk	«Районы-кварталы»	—	✔	—
Episode 2 (16 December)	2	Maria Tikhonova	10	Ulyanovsk	«Как бы мне влюбиться»	✔	✔	―
Episode 2 (16 December)	3	Firdavs Avezov	13	Tashkent, Uzbekistan	«Historia de un amor»	✔	✔	✔
Episode 2 (16 December)	4	Yaroslava Balakhmatova	7	Zelenograd, Moscow Oblast	«Пеппи»	✔	—	—
Episode 2 (16 December)	5	Gleb Lanskikh	15	Saratov	«Юность»	—	—	—
Episode 2 (16 December)	6	Milana Ponomarenko	14	Moscow	«Птиченька»	✔	✔	✔
Episode 2 (16 December)	7	Ivan Rogunov	12	Zagoryansky, Moscow Oblast	«Can You Feel the Love Tonight»	✔	✔	―
Episode 2 (16 December)	8	Varvara Gruzdeva	12	Moscow	«Я люблю буги-вуги»	—	—	—
Episode 2 (16 December)	9	Nikita Panov	13	Mytishchi, Moscow Oblast	«Голоса» / «Still Loving You»	—	✔	—
Episode 3 (Note: Basta is The best coach of episode 3.) (23 December)	1	Sofia Kiselyova	9	Mahilyov, Belarus	«Дуся-агрегат»	✔	✔	✔
Episode 3 (23 December)	2	Kamill Obukhov	10	Moscow	«Идёт девчонка»	✔	✔	―
Episode 3 (23 December)	3	Mishel Ten	11	Moscow	«Мыслепад»	―	―	―
Episode 3 (23 December)	4	Nikita Danko	9	Vladivostok	«Hallelujah I Love Her So»	✔	✔	✔
Episode 3 (23 December)	5	Anastasia Knyazeva	13	Krasnodar	«Смотри»	―	―	―
Episode 3 (23 December)	6	Mariam Darsaniya	7	Moscow	«Олей»	✔	―	―
Episode 3 (23 December)	7	Amelia Kolpakova	10	Moscow	«Ля-ля-фа»	✔	―	―
Episode 3 (23 December)	8	Elisey Shchyogolev	11	Moscow	«Царевна»	―	―	―
Episode 3 (23 December)	9	Sofya Pavlova	13	Petrozavodsk	«Mr.Paganini»	✔	✔	―
Episode 4 (Note: Basta is The best coach of episode 4.) (30 December)	1	Syuy Mokhan	12	Moscow	«Весёлый ветер»	✔	―	―
Episode 4 (30 December)	2	Andrey Avanesov	12	Moscow	«Caravan»	✔	✔	✔
Episode 4 (30 December)	3	Avrora Pozdnyakova	8	Podolsk, Moscow Oblast	«Кабриолет»	✔	―	✔
Episode 4 (30 December)	4	Alexander Shatin	9	Rostov, Yaroslavl Oblast	«Танкист»	―	―	―
Episode 4 (30 December)	5	Ekaterina Ivanova	14	Ulyanovsk	«Сестричка»	✔	✔	―
Episode 4 (30 December)	6	Ramazan Bikinin	11	Sterlitamak, Bashkiriya	«Глупые снежинки»	―	―	―
Episode 4 (30 December)	7	Georgy Taburkin	10	Ekaterinburg	«Starlight»	✔	✔	✔
Episode 4 (30 December)	8	Darya Buchinskaya	14	Vologda	«Шёл казак на побывку домой»	―	―	―
Episode 4 (30 December)	9	Danil Klyuzhin	12	Zarechny, Penza Oblast	«Il Mondo»	―	✔	✔
Episode 5 (Note: Basta is The best coach of episode 5.) (6 January)	1	Anna Dorovskaya	12	Saratov	«Течёт река Волга»	✔	✔	✔
Episode 5 (6 January)	2	Konstantin Goryashnikov	12	Korocha, Belgorod Oblast	«Нас бьют ― мы летаем»	✔	✔	✔
Episode 5 (6 January)	3	Anna Malinova	6	Vidnoye, Moscow Oblast	«Колыбельная Медведицы»	―	―	―
Episode 5 (6 January)	4	Polina Ponomaryova	13	Podolsk, Moscow Oblast	«Белой акации гроздья душистые»	―	―	✔
Episode 5 (6 January)	5	Zakhar Bobylyov	10	Moscow	«Я свободен!»	―	✔	―
Episode 5 (6 January)	6	Sofi Singkh	12	Tashkent, Uzbekistan	«I Believe I Can Fly»	✔	✔	✔
Episode 5 (6 January)	7	Arslan Sibgatullin	9	Kazan	«Песня старого извочика»	―	―	―
Episode 5 (6 January)	8	Maria Bratchikova	14	Saint Petersburg	«Ночной полёт»	✔	―	―
Episode 5 (6 January)	9	Denis Makarov	12	Nizhny Novgorod	«Я счастливый»	―	✔	✔
Episode 6 (Note: Basta is The best coach of episode 6.) (13 January)
Episode 6 (13 January)	1	Andrey Drobyshev	13	Novocherkassk, Rostov Oblast	«Услышит весь район»	✔	✔	✔
Episode 6 (13 January)	2	Tata Martynova	8	Moscow	«Quizás, Quizás, Quizás»	―	―	―
Episode 6 (13 January)	3	Olga Kosareva & Elina Nigmatullina	10/10	Kazan	«Сберегла»	―	―	✔
Episode 6 (13 January)	4	Elizaveta Nafieva	10	Kazan	«Челита»	―	―	―
Episode 6 (13 January)	5	Shandor Silantyev	11	Magnitogorsk, Chelyabinsk Oblast	«Uptown Funk»	✔	—	✔
Episode 6 (13 January)	6	Anna Roginskaya	7	Odintsovo, Moscow Oblast	«Полюшка»	✔	—	✔
Episode 6 (13 January)	7	Sergey Gorbachev	10	Pushkino, Moscow Oblast	«На Титанике»	―	―	―
Episode 6 (13 January)	8	Alena Yakovleva	9	Moscow	«Mamma Knows Best»	✔	✔	✔
Episode 6 (13 January)	9	Dmitry Minin	13	Moscow	«Орлы или вороны»	―	✔	―
Episode 7 (Note: Basta is The best coach of episode 7.) (20 January)
Episode 7 (20 January)	1	Darya Punchenko	10	Podolsk, Moscow Oblast	«Ищу тебя»	✔	✔	✔
Episode 7 (20 January)	2	Georgy Efimov	9	Ekaterinburg	«The Final Countdown»	―	―	―
Episode 7 (20 January)	3	Sofia Fadeeva	11	Kazan	«Танцы на стёклах»	—	✔	✔
Episode 7 (20 January)	4	Marianna Ayrapetyants	13	Moscow	«On the Sunny Side of the Street»	✔	✔	✔
Episode 7 (20 January)	5	Anastasia Chernova	9	Vsevolozhsk, Leningrad Oblast	«Поднимись над суетой»	―	―	―
Episode 7 (20 January)	6	Andrey Emelin	12	Moscow	«Virtual Insanity»	✔	✔	✔
Episode 7 (20 January)	7	Aleksandra Bakulina	13	Podolsk, Moscow Oblast	«Катастрофически»	―	―	Team full
Episode 7 (20 January)	8	Kirill Usov	10	Izhevsk, Udmurtia	«Два туриста»	—	✔	Team full
Episode 7 (20 January)	9	Maksim Khrulyov	12	Chernushka, Perm Krai	«Нас не догонят»	✔	✔	✔

== The Battles ==
The Battles began on 27 January 2023. Contestants who won their battle advanced to the Sing-off rounds.

Colour key

Artist won the Battle and advanced to the Sing-offs
Artist was eliminated

Episode	Coach	Order	Winner	Song	Losers	
Episode 8 (27 January)	Basta	1	Mariam Darsaniya	«Сестричка»	Maria Tikhonova	Yaroslava Balakhmatova
Episode 8 (27 January)	Basta	2	Syuy Mokhan	«На всю планету Земля»	Maksim Khrulyov	Kamil Obukhov
Episode 8 (27 January)	Basta	3	Anna Dorovskaya	«My Favorite Things»	Amelia Kolpakova	Alena Yakovleva
Episode 8 (27 January)	Basta	4	Ivan Rogunov	«Белая река»	Andrey Avanesov	Maria Bratchikova
Episode 8 (27 January)	Basta	5	Konstantin Gorishnyakov	«Холодно не будет»	Eva Avatisyan	Maksim Ovchinnikov
Episode 9 (3 February)	MakSim	1	Pavel Zilyov	«Ту-лу-ла»	Evdokia Sergeeva	Kirill Usov
Episode 9 (3 February)	MakSim	2	Stefania Kovalenko	«Дельтаплан»	Darya Punchenko	Zakhar Bobylyov
Episode 9 (3 February)	MakSim	3	Marianna Ayrapetyants	«Молитва»	Sofia Fadeeva	Nikita Panov
Episode 9 (3 February)	MakSim	4	Lev Smirnov	«Улыбка»	Sofia Kiselyova	Dmitry Minin
Episode 9 (3 February)	MakSim	5	Sofya Pavlova	«Beauty and the Beast»	Ekaterina Ivanova	Alexey Teltsov
Episode 10 (10 February)	Egor Kreed	1	Denis Makarov	«Самая-самая»	Nikita Danko	Danil Klyuzhin
Episode 10 (10 February)	Egor Kreed	2	Avrora Pozdnyakova	«ЛП» / «Покинула чат»	Olga Kosareva & Elina Nigmatullina	Anna Roginskaya
Episode 10 (10 February)	Egor Kreed	3	Firdavs Avezov	«В жизни так бывает»	Georgy Taburkin	Andrey Drobyshev
Episode 10 (10 February)	Egor Kreed	4	Sofya Singkh	«Without You»	Shandor Silantyev	Andrey Emelin
Episode 10 (10 February)	Egor Kreed	5	Milana Ponomarenko	«Милая» / «Sledgehammer»	Alina Shamukova	Polina Ponomaryova

== The Sing-offs ==
The Sing-offs started on 27 January. Contestants who were saved by their coaches advanced to the Final.

Colour key

Artist was saved by his/her coach and advanced to the Final
Artist was eliminated but received the Comeback and advanced to the Live Playoffs

Episode	Coach	Order	Artist	Song	Result
Episode 8 (27 January)	Basta	1	Mariam Darsaniya	«Олей»	Received the Comeback
Episode 8 (27 January)	Basta	2	Syuy Mokhan	«Весёлый ветер»	Received the Comeback
Episode 8 (27 January)	Basta	3	Anna Dorovskaya	«Течёт река Волга»	Advanced
Episode 8 (27 January)	Basta	4	Ivan Rogunov	«Can You Feel the Love Tonight»	Advanced
Episode 8 (27 January)	Basta	5	Konstantin Gorishnyakov	«Нас бьют — мы летаем»	Received the Comeback
Episode 9 (3 February)	MakSim	1	Pavel Zilyov	«Районы-кварталы»	Received the Comeback
Episode 9 (3 February)	MakSim	2	Stefania Kovalenko	«Отпускаю» / «Комета»	Received the Comeback
Episode 9 (3 February)	MakSim	3	Marianna Ayrapetyants	«On the Sunny Side of the Street»	Advanced
Episode 9 (3 February)	MakSim	4	Lev Smirnov	«Я буду помнить»	Advanced
Episode 9 (3 February)	MakSim	5	Sofya Pavlova	«Mr. Paganini»	Received the Comeback
Episode 10 (10 February)	Egor Kreed	1	Denis Makarov	«Я счастливый»	Advanced
Episode 10 (10 February)	Egor Kreed	2	Avrora Pozdnyakova	«Кабриолет»	Received the Comeback
Episode 10 (10 February)	Egor Kreed	3	Firdavs Avezov	«Historia de un amor»	Received the Comeback
Episode 10 (10 February)	Egor Kreed	4	Sofya Singkh	«I Believe I Can Fly»	Received the Comeback
Episode 10 (10 February)	Egor Kreed	5	Milana Ponomarenko	«Птиченька»	Advanced

== Live shows ==
Colour key

Artist was saved by the Public's votes
Artist was eliminated

=== Week 1: Live Playoffs (17 February) ===
As with season 2, each coach saved three artists who were eliminated in the Sing-offs. Playoff results were voted on in real time. Nine artists sang live and six of them were eliminated by the end of the night. Three saved artists advanced to the Final.

Episode	Coach	Order	Artist	Song	Public's vote	Result
Episode 11 (17 February) (Note: Basta is The best coach of episode 11.)	MakSim	1	Pavel Zilyov	"Трава у дома"	42%	Advanced
Episode 11 (17 February)	MakSim	2	Sofya Pavlova	"Зима"	25%	Eliminated
Episode 11 (17 February)	MakSim	3	Stefania Kovalenko	"«It's My Life»"	33%	Eliminated
Episode 11 (17 February)	Egor Kreed	4	Avrora Pozdnyakova	"Ангелы"	21,3%	Eliminated
Episode 11 (17 February)	Egor Kreed	5	Firdavs Avezov	"Наперегонки с ветром"	30%	Eliminated
Episode 11 (17 February)	Egor Kreed	6	Sofia Singkh	"Городок"	48,7%	Advanced
Episode 11 (17 February)	Basta	7	Mariam Darsaniya	"Тушури"	26%	Eliminated
Episode 11 (17 February)	Basta	8	Konstantin Gorishnyakov	"Орёл"	41,7%	Advanced
Episode 11 (17 February)	Basta	9	Mokhan Syuy	"На берегу озера Байкал"	32,3%	Eliminated

=== Week 2: Final (22 February) ===
Episode	Coach	Order	Artist	Song	Public's vote	Result
Episode 12 (22 February)
Episode 12 (22 February)	Final					
Episode 12 (22 February)	Egor Kreed	1	Denis Makarov	"Потерянный рай"	33,9%	Eliminated
Episode 12 (22 February)	Egor Kreed	2	Sofia Singkh	"Город, которого нет"	28,2%	Eliminated
Episode 12 (22 February)	Egor Kreed	3	Milana Ponomarenko	"Ты знаешь, мама"	37,9%	Advanced
Episode 12 (22 February)	MakSim	4	Pavel Zilyov	"Moscow Calling"	35%	Advanced
Episode 12 (22 February)	MakSim	5	Marianna Ayrapetyants	"Останусь"	31,2%	Eliminated
Episode 12 (22 February)	MakSim	6	Lev Smirnov	"I Don’t Want to Miss a Thing"	33,8%	Eliminated
Episode 12 (22 February)	Basta	7	Ivan Rogunov	"Ария мистера Икс"	27,2%	Eliminated
Episode 12 (22 February)	Basta	8	Konstantin Gorishnyakov	"Жди меня там"	29,4%	Eliminated
Episode 12 (22 February)	Basta	9	Anna Dorovskaya	"Город влюблённых"	43,4%	Advanced
Episode 12 (22 February)	Super Final					
Episode 12 (22 February)	Egor Kreed	1	Milana Ponomarenko	"Прекрасное далёко"	32,6%	Second place
Episode 12 (22 February)	MakSim	2	Pavel Zilyov	"Позови меня тихо по имени"	14,6%	Third place
Episode 12 (22 February)	Basta	3	Anna Dorovskaya	"Высоко"	52,8%	Winner

Non-competition performances
Performer	Song
Anna Dorovskaya (winner)	"Высоко"

== Best Coach ==
Colour key

- Best Coach
- Second place
- Third place
- Episode's Best Coach

Coach	Public's vote _{(per episode)}									Result
Coach	#1	#2	#3	#4	#5	#6	#7	#11	Av.	Result
Basta	63%	63%	64%	61%	58%	57%	62%	49%	60%	Best coach
Egor Kreed	20%	18%	20%	24%	25%	28%	22%	36%	24%	Second place
MakSim	17%	19%	16%	15%	17%	15%	16%	15%	16%	Third place
