= Kak lyubov tvoyu ponyat? =

Single by Jony, Anna Asti

from the album Ne ishchite vo mne zhanry
- Released: 17 November 2022
- Genre: Pop
- Length: 4:05
- Producer: Alex Davia

"Kak lyubov tvoyu ponyat?" (Russian: Как любовь твою понять?) is a song by Russian singer Jony and a Ukrainian and a Russian singer Anna Asti, published on 17 November 2022 as the fourth single from Jony's album Ne ishchite vo mne zhanry.

== Music video ==
The music video, directed by Alexey Good, was released on 25 November 2022 through Jony's YouTube channel.

== Credits ==
- Jony – vocals
- Anna Asti – vocals
- Alex Davia – producer

== Charts ==
=== Weekly charts ===
2022 weekly chart performance
Chart (2022)	Peak position
CIS Airplay (TopHit)	94
Lithuania (AGATA)	49
Russia Airplay (TopHit)	60

2023 weekly chart performance
Chart (2023)	Peak position
Belarus Airplay (TopHit)	173
CIS Airplay (TopHit)	94
Estonia Airplay (TopHit)	63
Latvia Airplay (LaIPA)	16
Latvia Airplay (TopHit)	5
Moldova Airplay (TopHit)	6
Russia Airplay (TopHit)	59

2024 weekly chart performance
Chart (2024)	Peak position
Moldova Airplay (TopHit)	88

2025 weekly chart performance
Chart (2025)	Peak position
Moldova Airplay (TopHit)	187

=== Monthly charts ===
2022 monthly chart performance
Chart (2022)	Peak position
CIS Airplay (TopHit)	99
Russia Airplay (TopHit)	64

2023 monthly chart performance
Chart (2023)	Peak position
CIS Airplay (TopHit)	95
Estonia Airplay (TopHit)	25
Latvia Airplay (TopHit)	9
Moldova Airplay (TopHit)	8
Russia Airplay (TopHit)	71

=== Year-end charts ===
2023 year-end chart performance
Chart (2023)	Position
Latvia Airplay (TopHit)	52
Moldova Airplay (TopHit)	23

2024 year-end chart performance
Chart (2024)	Position
Moldova Airplay (TopHit)	166

=== Decade-end charts ===
20's decade-end chart performance
Chart (2020–2025)	Position
Latvia Airplay (TopHit)	152
