= Jony (singer) =

Russian singer (born 1996)

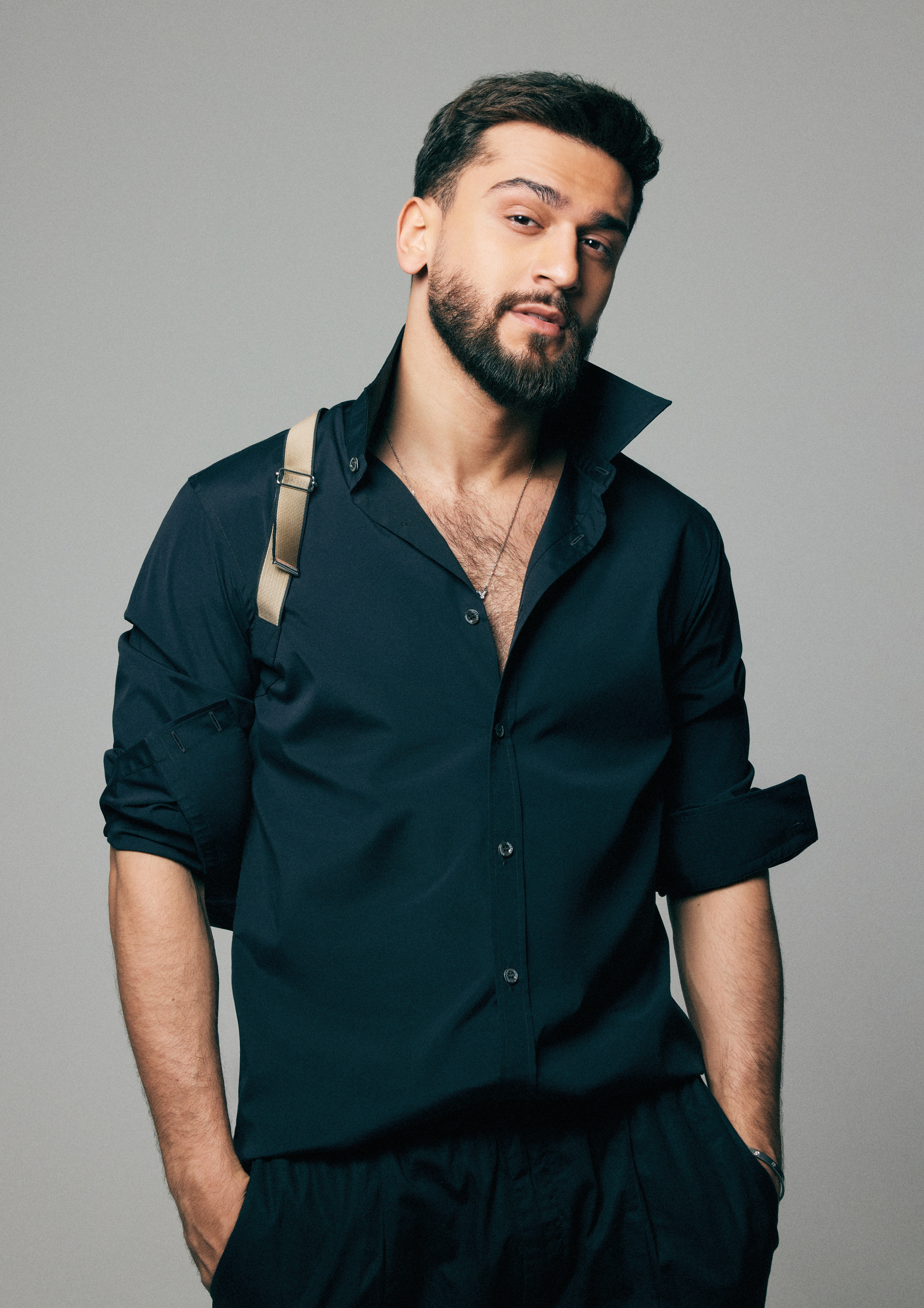
- Jony in July 2022

Background information
- Born: Cahid Əfrayıl oğlu Hüseynli; 29 February 1996 (age 30); Baku, Azerbaijan
- Origin: Moscow, Russia
- Genres: Russian pop; hookah rap; R&B
- Occupations: Singer; songwriter; rapper
- Years active: 2018–present
- Labels: RAAVA Music; Atlantic Records Russia
- Website: jony-music.com

Jahid Afrayil oglu Huseynli (Azerbaijani: Cahid Əfrayıl oğlu Hüseynli; Russian: Джахид Афраил оглы Гусейнли; born 29 February 1996), known professionally as Jony, is a Russian singer and songwriter of Azerbaijani descent. He is the winner of the second season of the Russian reality singing show The Masked Singer (2021) on NTV.

Winner of the Golden Gramophone Award, Zhara Music Awards, Muz-TV and New Radio Awards. Winner of the 2023 30 Under 30 rating in the Music category.

In 2024, he became a coach on the eleventh season of the Russian edition of The Voice Kids.

== Early life and education ==
Jahid was born on February 29, 1996, in Baku to Azerbaijani parents. At the age of 4, he moved with his family to Moscow. At the age of 6, he went to the 1925th gymnasium in Novokosino. In the first grade, he began to sing in the school choir and impressed his teachers with his vocals. In ninth grade, he realized that he wanted to seriously pursue music.

However, Jony's father did not support his decision, as he wanted him to follow in his footsteps and become a businessman. After graduating from school, Jony entered State University of Management at the Faculty of International Business without much enthusiasm.

After completing his Master's degree, Jony realized that he wanted to play music professionally and asked his father to give him a chance to try his hand at it.

"I was 22 years old when I asked my father to give me a chance to try my hand at something I love. Working for my father, who is the director of the company, is the easiest way, but he did not suit me and did not satisfy my ambitions. I only added at the same time that if something doesn’t work out for me, I will return and admit that I am a fool. But in the depths of my soul I knew that I could not come to my father with my head bowed and admit my defeat - what kind of man am I after that?".

== Career ==
While studying at university, Jony began recording various cover versions of popular songs and publishing them on his Instagram profile. Soon he met Ioann Zhani Kuznetsov (Andro), and then Elman Zeynalov (El'man). In 2018, together they created the music label RAAVA Music.

Later Jony began working on his own songs and released five singles: "Empty Glass", "Friend Zone", "Star", "Alley" and "I'm Not Me Without You" (together with HammAli & Navai). The video filmed for the song "Alley" received more than 100 million views on YouTube.

In September 2019, Jony released the song "Comet", which soon topped the Apple Music chart and became the singer's signature song.

In 2020, the album "Heavenly Roses" was released.

In 2021, he left RAAVA Music and decided to pursue a solo career.

In 2022, Jony released several hit singles, including "World of Green" (featuring Leonid Agutin) and "Moon Night" (featuring Emin). His song "Kak lyubov tvoyu ponyat?" (together with Anna Asti) became one of the top-charting tracks of the year.

=== Artist nickname ===
As a child, Jahid liked the cartoon Johnny Bravo, so his mother jokingly began to call him Jony. Later, the singer began to introduce himself this way at school, when classmates could not remember his name.

"I got used to the name "JONY", even my mother calls me that since I was three years old. Only my grandparents in Azerbaijan call me by my first name. But parents and friends - almost never. Most often "JONY", "Jo"."

=== The Masked Singer ===
In 2021, Jony took part in the second season of the Russian reality singing show The Masked Singer, which aired on the NTV channel from February 14 to May 2. He was hiding under the image of "Crocodile" and won.

Throughout the show's season, he sang 13 songs:

- Lou Bega «Mambo No. 5»
- Luciano Pavarotti «Caruso»
- Monatik «Kruzhit»
- Vladimir Presnyakov «Strannik»
- Jamiroquai «Virtual Insanity»
- Nerves «Kofe moi drug»
- Leonid Agutin «Hop Hey Lala-Lei»
- James Brown «It’s a Man’s Man’s Man’s World»
- Adam Lambert «Whataya Want from Me»
- Muslim Magomaev «Blue Eternity»
- Hozier «Take Me to Church»
- Maxim Fadeev and Nargiz «Vdvoem»
- Mark Ronson and Bruno Mars «Uptown Funk»

The jury members (Valeria, Philip Kirkorov, Regina Todorenko, Timur Rodriguez, Alexander Revva) highly praised his performance and could not determine which performer was hiding under the mask until the very end. Philipp Kirkorov noted that he had not experienced such creative ecstasy for 30 years and said that he could now retire peacefully. Jony, in turn, said that he had dreamed of becoming a participant in the show since the first season in order to demonstrate the facets of talent that he could not express in his traditional work.

=== Show "Voice. Children" ===
In 2024, he became a mentor of the 11th season of The Voice Kids TV project.

== Discography ==
=== Solo tracks ===
Year	Title	Album
2018	Empty Glass	“List of Your Thoughts”
2018	Friendzone	“List of Your Thoughts”
2019	Star	“List of Your Thoughts”
2019	Alley	“List of Your Thoughts”
2019	Without You I'm Not Myself (feat. HammAli & Navai)	“List of Your Thoughts”
2019	You Enchanted Me	“List of Your Thoughts”
2019	Love Your Voice	“List of Your Thoughts”
2019	Lali	“List of Your Thoughts”
2019	Give Me Your Hand	“List of Your Thoughts”
2019	Comet	Non-Album Singles
2020	Madam (feat. Andro)	Non-Album Singles
2020	You Are Merciless	“Heavenly Roses”
2020	You Soar	“Heavenly Roses”
2020	And Outside, It's Raining	“Heavenly Roses”
2020	The World Has Gone Crazy	“Heavenly Roses”
2020	Heavenly Roses	“Heavenly Roses”
2020	Emptiness	Non-Album Singles
2021	Falling—Catch Me	Non-Album Singles
2021	Landslide	Non-Album Singles
2021	Blue Eyes	Non-Album Singles
2021	Boss (feat. The Limba)	Non-Album Singles
2021	Maybe You Don't Remember Me (feat. HammAli)	“Don't Search Genres in Me”
2022	Credits	“Don't Search Genres in Me”
2022	Let’s Go With ‘You’	Non-Album Single
2022	Not at All	“Don't Search Genres in Me”
2022	"Kak lyubov tvoyu ponyat?" (with Anna Asti)	“Don't Search Genres in Me”
2022	My Heaven	“Don't Search Genres in Me”
2022	When You Understand Everything (feat. Navai)	“Don't Search Genres in Me”
2022	Needles	“Don't Search Genres in Me”
2022	No Sense	“Don't Search Genres in Me”
2022	Warm Me Up	“Don't Search Genres in Me”
2022	Silhouette (feat. Erika Lundmoen)	“Don't Search Genres in Me”
2022	Regression	“Don't Search Genres in Me”
2022	Diamond	“Don't Search Genres in Me”
2022	Wind	“Don't Search Genres in Me”
2022	Polygon	“Don't Search Genres in Me”
2022	East (feat. TLK)	“Don't Search Genres in Me”
2023	Bewitched	Non-Album Single
2023	omg	“Summer and Period”
2023	Airy Sundress	“Summer and Period”
2023	Can't Forget	Non-Album Singles
2023	Photofilm	Non-Album Singles
2023	Freed	Non-Album Singles
2024	It Doesn't Hurt	“Epic”
2024	Rivers Lead	Non-Album Single
2024	Fire	“Epic”
2024	I Need More	“Epic”
2024	Without Excess Words (feat. Daniel’)	“Epic”
2024	Rivers Lead (feat. Nikruz)	“Epic”
	The Rain Roared	Non- Album Single
	Deja Vu	Non- Album Single
	I'm flying	Non- Album Single
2025	Couple of Abnormal	“Near”
2025	Poem	“Near”
2025	I remember	“Near”
2025	Pour out your soul	“Near”
2025	Near	“Near”
2025	Take everything	“Near”
2025	Lonely	“Near”
2025	About You	“Near”
2025	Oxygen	“Near”
2026	Beautiful	Non- Album Single
2026	Euphoria	Non- Album Single

OfficialPageofJony/YouTube

=== Featured Tracks ===
Year	Date	Title	Min	Performer	Album
2019	11 Mar.	Sneakers	2:22	El’man	Non-Album Single
2020	27 Mar.	Fireplace	3:05	Emin	“44”
2020	10 Apr.	Are You Really Mine?	3:23	Bahh Tee	“10 Years Later”
2020	10 Jun.	Lollipop	2:29	Gafur	“Kaleidoscope”
2021	15 Jan.	Balcony	3:18	El’man	“Muse”
2021	12 Mar.	Lilies	3:18	Mot	Non-Album Single
2021	11 Nov.	Believe	3:18	Dima Bilan	“13 Friends of Bilan”
2021	26 Nov.	Cheremushka	2:18	Andro	“Jani Gipsy”
2021	10 Dec.	You Will Leave	2:46	Rakhim	Non-Album Single
2022	15 Jul.	Moonlit Night	3:23	Emin	“44”
2022	11 Nov.	World of Green Color	3:52	Leonid Agutin	Non-Album Single
2022	23 Dec.	New Year's Song	3:46	Vlad A4, Egor Kreed	Non-Album Single
2023	8 Sep.	I'll Be Here	3:43	MIIDAS	“Neo-Romance”
2024	19 Jan.	Disappear Beautifully	2:24	Roman Bestseller	“Science Fiction”
2024	1 Mar.	Fire (T'es ma cherie)	3:15	Roman Bestseller	“Science Fiction”
2024	3 May.	Smoke	2:53	Egor Kreed	Non-Album Single
2024	5 Jul.	On the Streets of Baku	3:17	Natia Rigvava	Non-Album Single

=== Other Tracks ===
Year	Date	Title	Min
2019	18 Oct.	Comet (Remix)	3:40
2021	23 Dec.	On the Purple Moon (Cover)	2:08
2022	12 Jul.	Subtitles (Remix)	3:24

=== Music Videos ===
External videos
- Music Videos on Youtube • «Alley» • «You captivated me» • «Comet» • «Fireplace» • «Emptiness» • «Lilies» • «Boss» • «You Probably Don't Remember Me» • «Moonlit Night» • «No Way» • «How to Understand Your Love?» • «New Year's Song» • «omg» • "Air Sarafan" • "Volen"

Year	Date	Title	Director	Producer	YouTube	VK Video
2019	Mar 20	Alley	Not specified	Elman Zeynalov	160 million	1 million
2019	Jun 21	You captivated me	Maria Kovalenko	Elman Zeynalov	65 million	0.3 million
2020	25 Feb.	Comet	Zhandos Tungyshbaev; Maria Roshchina	Erkebulan Kurishbaev	30 million	—
2020	13 Apr.	Kamin	Alexander Romanov	Svetlana Vezucha	54 million	1 million
2021	12 Feb	Emptiness	Sasha Bunch	Sasha Bunch	15 million	0.3 million
2021	13 May	Lilies	Alexey Zhukov	Turan Kurbanov	53 million	0.1 million
2021	Nov 18	Boss	Rustam Romanov	Ekaterina Galanina	28 million	0.2 million
2021	Dec 14	Probably you don't remember me (feat. HammAli)	Eugene	Angela Zhgutova	33 million	0.2 million
2022	Aug 31	Moonlit Night	Samir Bagirov	Orhan Guseinov	55 million	0.5 million
2022	Sep 9	No way	Genrikh Meder	Svetlana Vezucha	30 million	1 million
2022	Nov 25	How to understand your love?	Alexey Khoroshy	Darra Dmitrieva	60 million	1 million
2022	Dec 24	New Year's song	Enendroen	Erkebulan Baiguzhin	35 million	—
2023	Jul 29	omg	Dimash Maimakov	Sergey Karimov	1 million	1 million
2023	Aug 4	Aerial Sundress	Anton Menshikov	Svetlana Vezuchaya	11 million	2 million
2023	10 Nov.	Volen	Heinrich Meder	Svetlana Vezuchaya	3 million	2.4 million
2024	Apr 17	It doesn't hurt me	Elvin Fomin	Svetlana Vezuchaya		
2024	May 3.	Smoke	Elvin Fomin	Svetlana Vezuchaya		

== Filmography ==
Year	Title	Role	Notes	Ref.
2021	My Little Pony: A New Generation	Sprout Cloverleaf	Russian Vocal	

== Audiobooks ==
- 2023 — “Ivan Tsarevich and the Gray Wolf” — audiobook performer

== Reviews, Certifications and Awards ==
«List of your thoughts»
Review scores
Source	Rating
InterMedia	8/10 stars

«Heavenly Roses»
Review scores
Source	Rating
InterMedia	6/10 stars

Awards and nominations

Year	Award	Category	Result
2020	Nickelodeon Kids’ Choice Awards	Favorite music artist of Russian viewers	Nominated
2020	Zhara Music Awards	Breakthrough of the Year	Won
2020	Zhara Music Awards	Show of the Year	Nominated
2020	OK! Awards	New Faces. Music	Won
2021	New Radio Awards	Best Artist	Won
2021	Zhara Music Awards	Singer of the Year	Won
2021	Muz-TV Awards	Song of the year	Won
2021	Pesnya goda	For the song "You are merciless"	Won
2022	OK! Awards	The main character. Music	Won
2022	New Radio Awards	Best Collaboration (shared with Mot for "Lilies")	Won
2022	Zhara Music Awards	Singer of the Year	Nominated
2022	Zhara Music Awards	Video of the Year	Nominated
2022	Zhara Music Awards	Collaboration of the Year	Won
2022	New Song of the Year	For the song "Nikak"	Won
2022	Pesnya goda	For the song "Titry"	Won
2022	Golden Gramophone	For the song "Titles"	Won
2023	New Radio Awards	Best Artist	Nominated
2023	New Radio Awards	Best Single	Nominated
2023	Zhara Music Awards	Singer of the Year	Won
2023	Zhara Music Awards	VK Music's Choice	Won
2023	Zhara Music Awards	Collaboration of the year	Nominated
2023	Zhara Music Awards	Song of the year	Nominated
2023	Zhara Music Awards	Album of the year	Nominated
2023	Zhara Music Awards	Video of the year	Nominated
2023	Zhara Music Awards	Trendsetter of the year	Nominated
2023	Zhara Music Awards	Lyric artist	Nominated
2023	RU.TV Award 2023	Best singer	Won
2023	VK Clip Awards	Musician of the Year	Won

== Chart positions ==
=== Albums ===
Year	Work	Chart	
Year	Work	Apple Music Top 10 Albums	Vkontakte Top 10 Albums
2019	List of your thoughts	1	2
2020	Heavenly Roses	1	
2022	Don't look for genres in me		
2024	EPIC		

=== Local charts ===
Year	Work	Chart				
Year	Work	iTunes Top 100 Russia	Apple Music Weekly TOP-10	Top Radio & YouTube Hits Russia Top-50	Top Radio Hits Russia Top-50	Top YouTube Hits Russia Top-50
2019	Alley	11	7	3	2	8
2019	Без тебя я не я	3	8	—	—	—
2019	Love Your Voice	13	—	—	—	35
2019	Lali	4	3	—	—	12
2019	Comet	1	1	18	19	18
2020	Madam	1	2	—	—	34
2020	Fireplace	1	—	37	—	16
2020	You are merciless	1	1	23	32	20

Track	Top chart positions								
Track	Russia VK Music	Russia Apple Music	Russia Yandex Music	Kazakhstan Apple Music	Ukraine Apple Music	Kazakhstan VK Music	Russia Spotify	CIS Top Radio & YouTube Hits	Russia Top Radio & YouTube Hits
Empty glass	43	74	—	—	—	—	—	—	
Friendzone	26	78	—	—	—	—	—	333	
Star	22	—	—	—	14	—	—	—	
Sneakers	58	—	—	—	—	—	—	—	
Alley	2	4	33	—	—	—	—	4	3
Without you I'm not me	1	8	17	—	—	—	—	258	
You captivated me	11	29	—	—	—	—	—	91	
Love Your Voice	12	17	92	—	—	—	—	397	
Lali	1	2	17	—	—	43	—	128	
Give me your hand	78	—	—	—	—	—	—	—	
Comet	1	1	2	97	—	7	—	39	18
Madam	1	1	7	—	—	—	—	96	
Fireplace	1	4	6	—	—	93	—	66	
Are you really mine?	36	88	26	—	—	—	—	—	
You are merciless	1	1	4	—	—	70	—	48	23
Lollipop	2	2	8	—	—	—	59		—
You are a bet	3	3	55	—	—	92	—	22	
And it's raining outside	18	15	—	—	—	—	—	251	
The world has gone mad	8	5	46			71	—	113	
Heavenly Roses	16	22	19	—	—	7	—	233	
Emptiness	3	2	6	—	—	32	50	117	
Balcony	4	3	63	30	—	35	—	94	
Catch me when I fall	5	4	—	—	—	—	47	150	
Lilies	4	2	36	—	12	—	—	25	
Rockfall	9	2	2	—	—	—	39	353	
BLUE EYES	32	11	13	—	—	18	—	—	
Boss	2	1	1	1	1	1	6	148	
You probably don't remember me	2	3	1	2	4	1	35	65	
Believe	—	—	2	—	—	96	—	—	
Bird cherry	71	—	—	—	32	—	—	—	
You will leave	14	9	50	6	17	15	—	306	
On the lilac moon	3	4	16	7	5	3	—	358	
Subtitles	1	1	12	1	8	1	—	9	4
Let's be informal	23	18	5	—	—	—	—	84	80
No way	2	3	2	—	—	—	—	44	25
How can I understand your love?	1	1	1	—	—	—	—	—	97
Spellbound	8	—	—	—	—	—	—	—	453
Airy Sarafan	4	27	18	—	—	—	—	—	32
I can't forget									
