= Macan (singer) =

Russian rapper (born 2002)

- Born: Andrei Kirillovich Kosolapov; January 6, 2002 (age 24); Moscow, Russia
- Genres: Rap; Hip-hop
- Years active: 2019-present

Andrey Kirillovich Kosolapov (Russian: Андре́й Кири́ллович Косола́пов; born 6 January 2002 in Moscow, Russia, better known under the pseudonym MACAN (stylized in all caps; Russian: Мака́н), is a Russian rapper and songwriter. The frequent topics of his songs are cars, friends and love struggles.

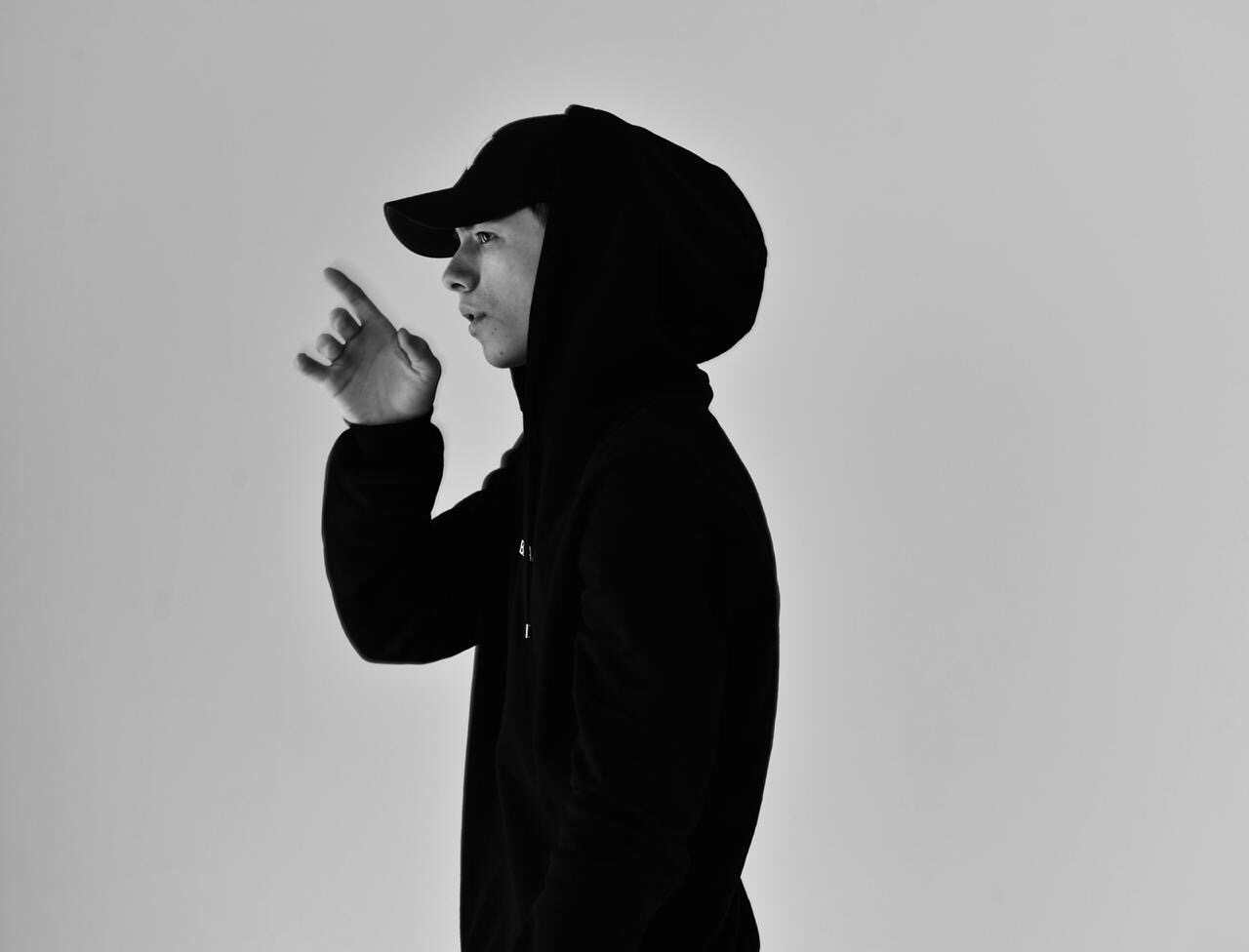
Macan-2020

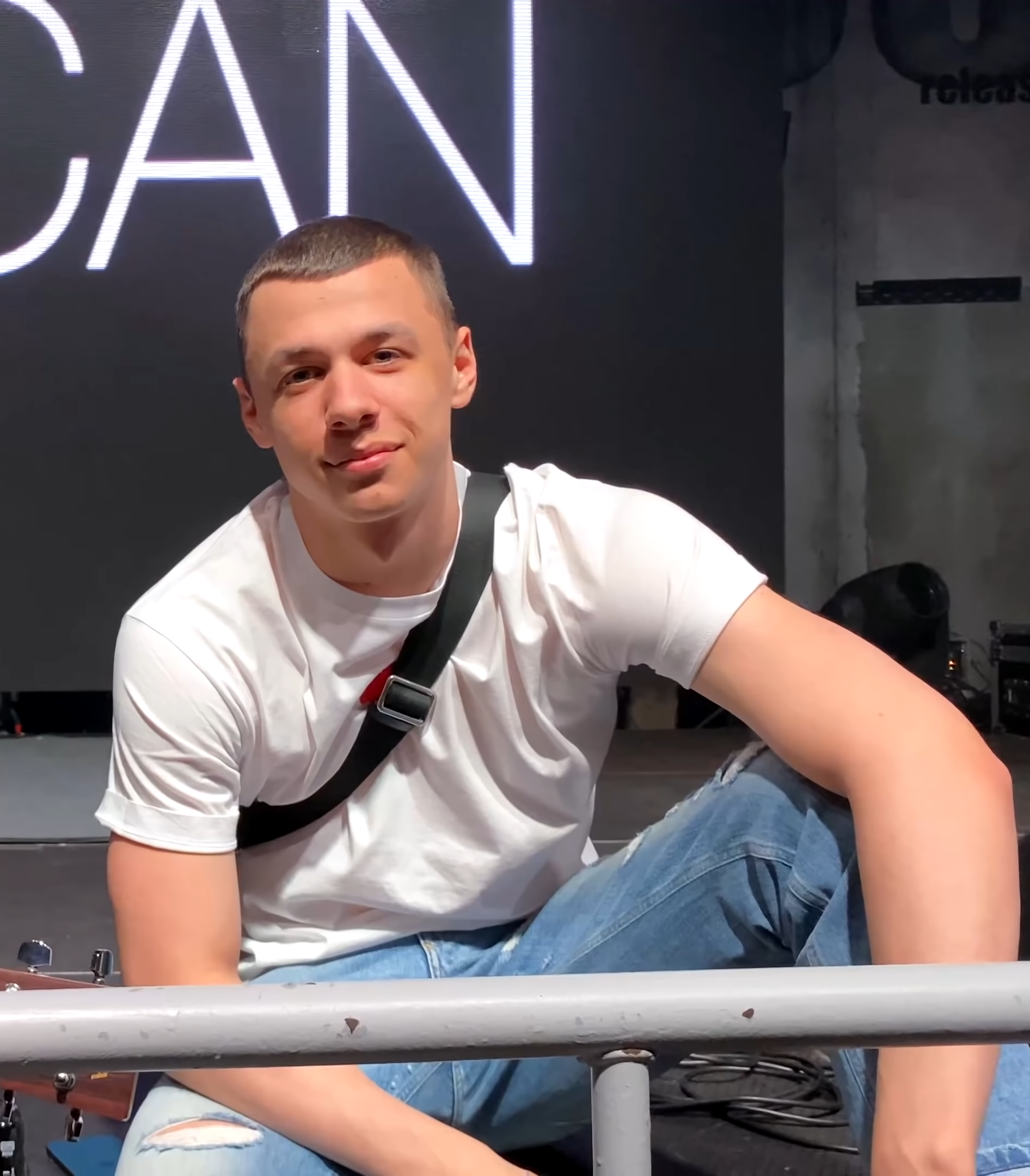
Macan in June 2021

== Early years ==
Andrey Kosolapov was born January 6, 2002 in Moscow to a family of lawyers, who graduated from the Faculty of Law of Moscow State University. His father later became a film director and producer, and his mother switched to psychology. As a child, Andrey attended a music school, but found it uninteresting, as he preferred rap to classical music. He wrote and recorded his fist song at the age of 11.

For his college education, he enrolled into the Russian Presidential Academy of National Economy and Public Administration to study law. While there, he released tracks under the pseudonyms MC Guy Fawkes, Nemo MC, and Young Chaser on the social network VK (service). In 2018, the artist chose the stage name Macan, a reference to the Porsche Macan, which also means "tiger" in Malay. Around that time, Andrey dropped out of college before completing his degree.

== Career ==
Kosolapov gained his first popularity in 2019 instantly after his first single "Onto me" and his debut album "1000 km to the Dream" were released.

In early 2021, he released the studio album "2002+18", where he called teenagers to be honest, find the better in themselves, fight for loved ones, and to "be a man". Macan compared his lyrical hero to Danila Bagrov from Brother 2 movie.

In September 2022, the song "Останься образом" was included in the top 15 hits according to Afisha Daily, "which Russia forgot about this summer".

In December 2022, Macan released a new studio album "12", which achieved more than 15 million streams on the streaming platform VK Music.

In 2022 and 2023, he was recognized as Artist of the Year by the music platform VK Music.

In December 2023, the streaming service VK Music once again recognized Macan as Artist of the Year, and his album "12" was named Album of the Year. In 2024, he repeated this achievement with the album "I AM" and achieved the same success on the Yandex Music platform.

On November 28, 2025, Macan announced a suspension his concert activities, because he was drafted into selective military service in Russia. He will be serving in the Separate Operational Purpose Division of the Russian National Guard in a non-combat duty.

== Personal life ==
Kosolapov is a Christian.

Russian tabloids reported Macan dating several Russian women at different times: blogger Dayana Pogosova prior to 2019 and model Maria Motina in 2024-2025.

== Discography ==
=== Studio albums ===
Title	Details
"1000 км до мечты" (1000 km to the dream)	Release: 8 August 2019; Label: Rhymes Music; Format: Digital, streaming
"2002+18"	Release: 29 January 2021; Label: Golden Sound; Format: Digital, streaming
"SOLO"	Release: 12 November 2021; Label: Golden Sound; Format: Digital, streaming
"12"	Release: 16 December 2022; Label: Soyuz Music; Format: Digital, streaming; https://www.youtube.com/watch?v=iqBuBGkRQeU&list=PLIW9bm_UJQvKE5Ur4RqEtZ8220Qfx12YR
