= Valya Karnaval =

Russian singer & vlogger (born 2001)

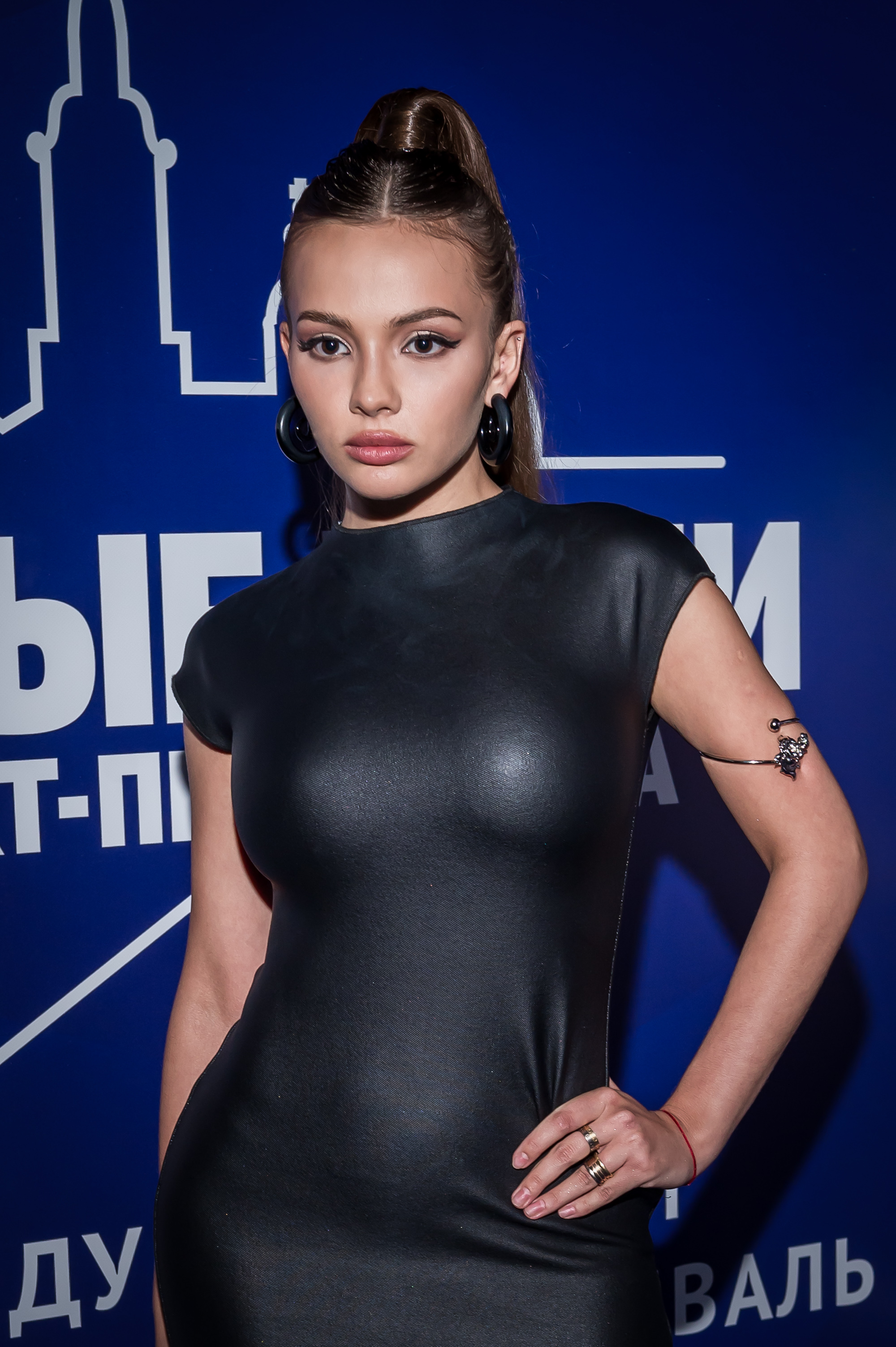
- Born: Valentina Vasilievna Karnaukhova; November 11, 2001 (age 24); Rostov-on-Don, Russia
- Occupations: Blogger; singer; actress

YouTube information
- Channel: KarnaVal
- Years active: 2018–present
- Genre: Music videos
- Subscribers: 1.45 million
- Views: 116 million
- Last updated: 22 October 2025

Valentina Vasilyevna Karnaukhova (Russian: Валенти́на Васи́льевна Карнау́хова; born 11 November 2001), known professionally as Karna.val or Valya Karnaval, is a Russian video blogger, TikTok personality, singer, and actress.

In October 2020, the Russian edition of Forbes ranked Karnaval fifth on its inaugural list of the highest-paid TikTokers. By the end of that year, she was ranked sixth among the "top artists" in the Russian-speaking segment of TikTok, based on the frequency with which her songs were used in user-generated videos. Her song "Psych Ward" was also listed as the ninth most-used track on TikTok in 2020.

== Early life and education ==
Karnaukova was born on 11 November 2001 in Rostov-on-Don, Russia. Her parents moved to Rostov-on-Don from Jizzakh, Uzbekistan. She engaged in athletics during her youth but had to discontinue due to health issues. She also studied dance. Until the age of 15, Karnaukova lived in the village of Novobataysk in the Rostov region, where her home was heated with a simple stove. According to Karnaval, she experienced bullying in school due to her family's financial situation.

After completing the ninth grade at School No. 9 in Novobataysk, Karnaukova enrolled in the Rostov College of Advertising, Service, and Tourism. However, she eventually dropped out due to frequent absences. Forbes later reported that she had also enrolled in another local college but did not complete her studies there either.

== Career ==
In 2018, at the age of 17, Karnaukova registered on Musical.ly (now TikTok), where she initially focused on creating humorous videos. Within her first year on the platform, she gained 350,000 followers. Karnaval currently resides in Moscow and frequently collaborates with fellow TikTok personality Yulia Gavrilina.

In 2020, Karnaval became a member of Hype House, a TikTok content collective. That summer, she launched her music career with the release of her debut single "Psych Ward," with the music video premiering in September 2020. In addition to her music endeavors, she made her acting debut in the TNT television series Vacation, portraying a teenage girl. The pilot episode was filmed in May 2019, and the series began production in late June 2020. It aired between February and March 2021.

In November 2020, Karnaval published an autobiographical book titled Hey, Bandits. In February 2022, she participated in the second season of the TNT reality show Celebrities in Africa, where she reached the finals.

== Online content ==
On TikTok, Karnaval produces a variety of content, including humorous skits, dance routines, and sports-related videos. In the past, she also streamed gaming content on YouTube. According to Forbes, her online persona, characterized by a cute appearance and the use of affectionate terms like "bandits" to address her audience, resonates with her fanbase. She frequently appears with a plush bear named Potap in her videos.

== Personal life ==
Karnaval does not publicly disclose much about her personal life. However, it has been reported that she was in a relationship with fellow social media personality Yegor Ship, which ended in 2020. She confirmed this in an interview with a popular YouTube channel in August 2020.

In February 2022, athlete and blogger Sasha Stone proposed to Karnaval during a trip to the Maldives, and she accepted. The couple had met while participating in Celebrities in Africa. Despite plans to marry in 2022, it was reported in the summer of 2023 that they had separated.

== Discography ==
=== Singles ===
Year	Name	Charts						
Year	Name	Russia						
Year	Name	TopHit Top Radio & YouTube Hits	TopHit Top YouTube Hits	TikTok	VK	Shazam	Zvooq. online	YouTube
2020	«Психушка»	75	12	—N/a	11	17	16	6
2020	«Опять домой»	152	31	—N/a			18	7
2020	«Истерика»	—	26	—N/a	4			
2020	«Не сплю ночами»	—	—					
2021	«Ромашки»							
2021	«Глупенькая девочка»							
2021	«Тихий Гимн» (DJ Smash & Karna.val)							
2021	«Плохая девочка»							
2022	«Ой, Мама»							
2022	«Ромашки 2» (Karna.val & ROM)							

== Ratings ==
- The highest paid tiktokers according to Forbes 5th place
- The most popular tiktokers in Russia 8th place
- Top 5 Tiktok Singing Stars 4th place
