= Yana Churikova =

Russian journalist and television host (born 1978)

- Яна Чурикова
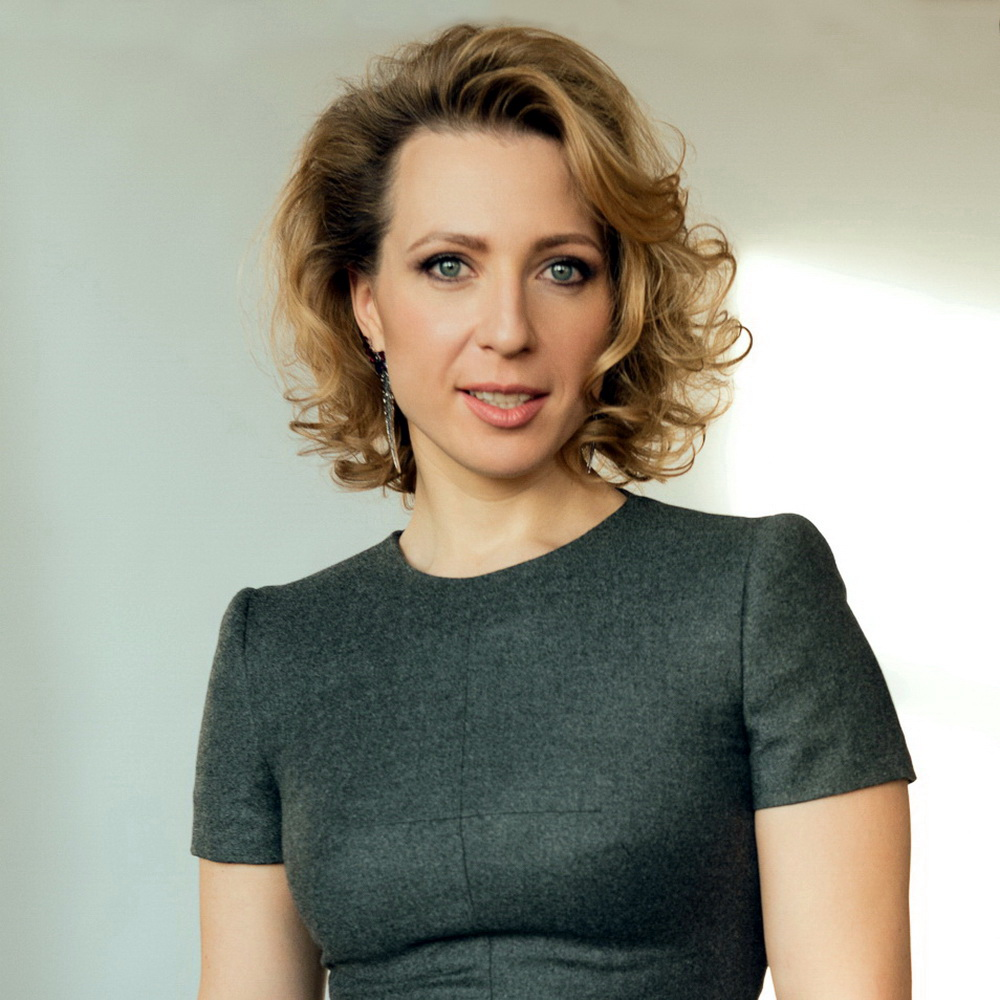
- Born: Yana Alekseyevna Churikova; 6 November 1978 (age 47); Moscow, RSFSR, USSR
- Occupations: Television presenter; journalist; television producer; editor-in-chief
- Yana Churikova's voice Churikova on the Echo of Moscow program, 20 December 2007
- Website: yanachurikova.ru

Yana Alekseyevna Churikova (Russian: Яна Алексеевна Чурикова; born 6 November 1978) is a Russian journalist and television host who worked on MTV Russia before moving to Channel One, where she hosted seven seasons of the Star Factory talent show.

== Career ==
She has also gained publicity across Europe and the world for presenting the results of the Russian televote at the Eurovision Song Contest for several years. Churikova was to host the Eurovision Song Contest 2009, to be held in Moscow, Russia. However, her pregnancy was announced shortly afterwards and she instead hosted only the allocation draw to determine the participating countries' semi-finals. Her daughter Taisa Lazareva was born on 26 May 2009, 10 days after the Eurovision final.

Every other year, from 2009 to 2021, Churikova provided commentary on the Eurovision Song Contest for Channel One. She hosted the Russian national final for the Eurovision Song Contest 2021.
