= The Voice Kids (Russian TV series) season 3 =

Season of television series

The Voice Kids
- Season 3
- Presented by: Dmitry Nagiev; Valeriya Lanskaya
- Coaches: Dima Bilan; Pelageya; Leonid Agutin
- Winner: Danil Pluzhnikov
- Winning coach: Dima Bilan
- Runner-up: Rayana Aslanbekova

Release
- Original network: Channel One
- Original release: February 20 – April 29, 2016

Season chronology
- ← Previous; Season 2 Next → Season 4

The third season of the Russian reality talent show The Voice Kids premiered on February 20, 2016 on Channel One. Dima Bilan and Pelageya returned from the previous season for their third seasons as coaches, debuting coach Leonid Agutin, coach in 1-3 seasons of The Voice, replaced Maxim Fadeev. Dmitry Nagiev returned as the show's presenter, Valeriya Lanskaya replaced Anastasiya Chevazhevskaya as a co-presenter.

Danil Pluzhnikov was announced the winner on April 29, 2016 marking Dima Bilan's first win as a coach.

== Coaches and presenters ==
The Voice Kids season 3 coaching panel and presenters

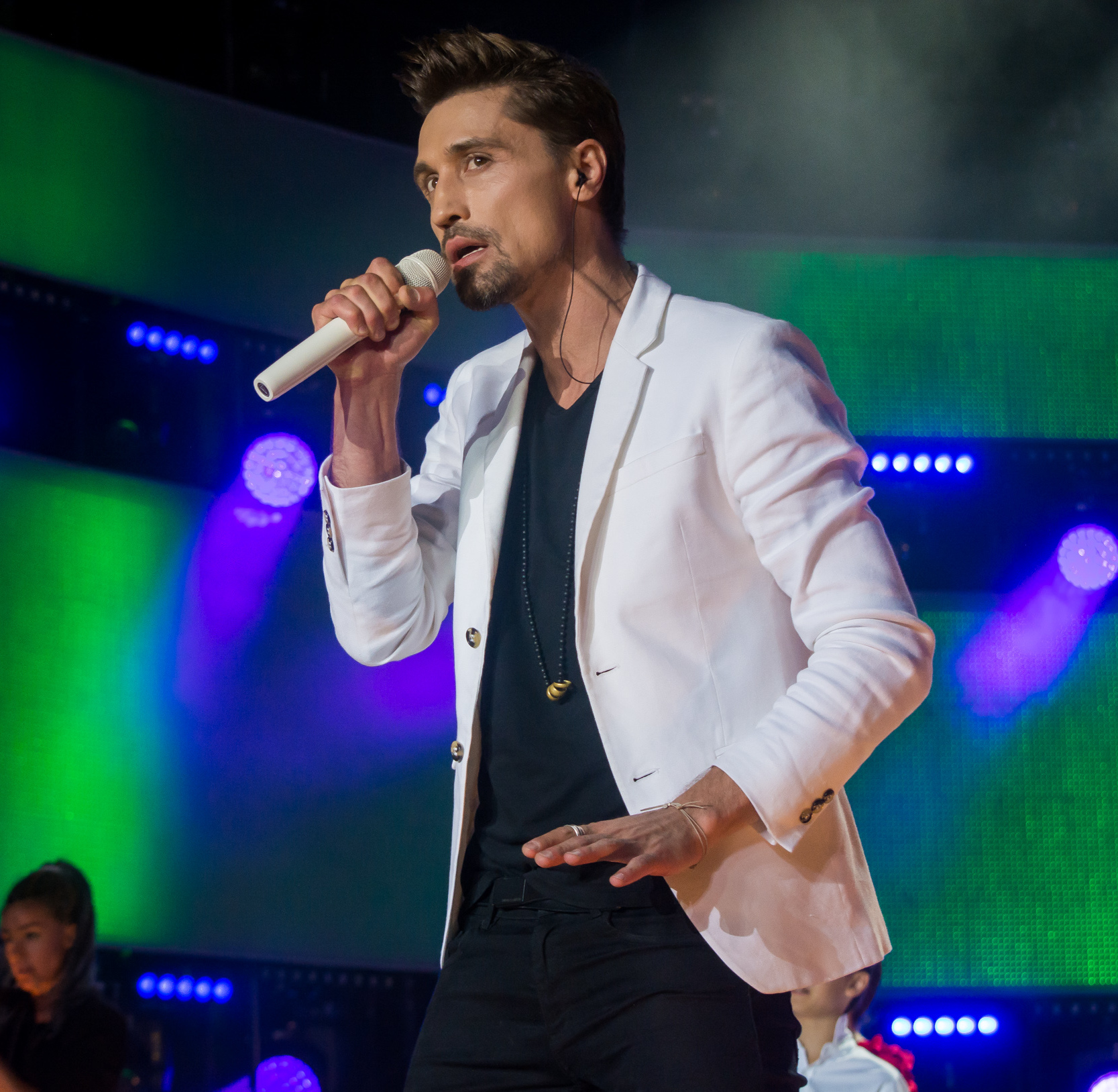
Dima Bilan

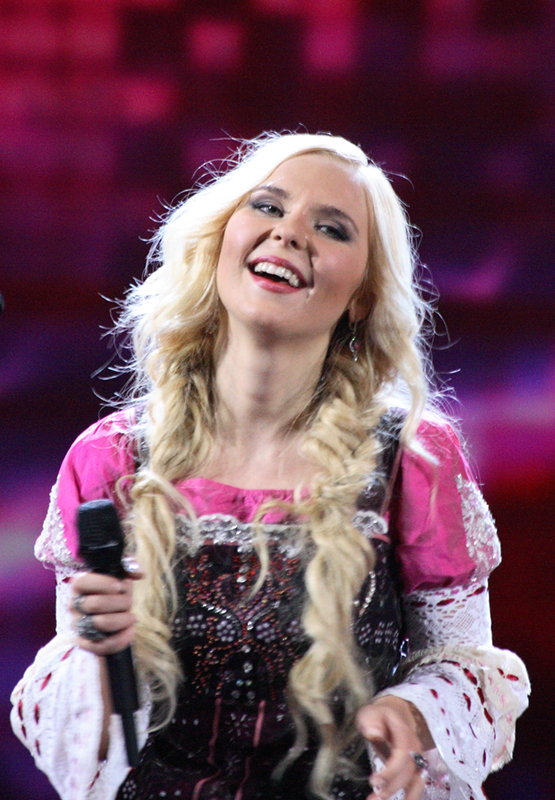
Pelageya

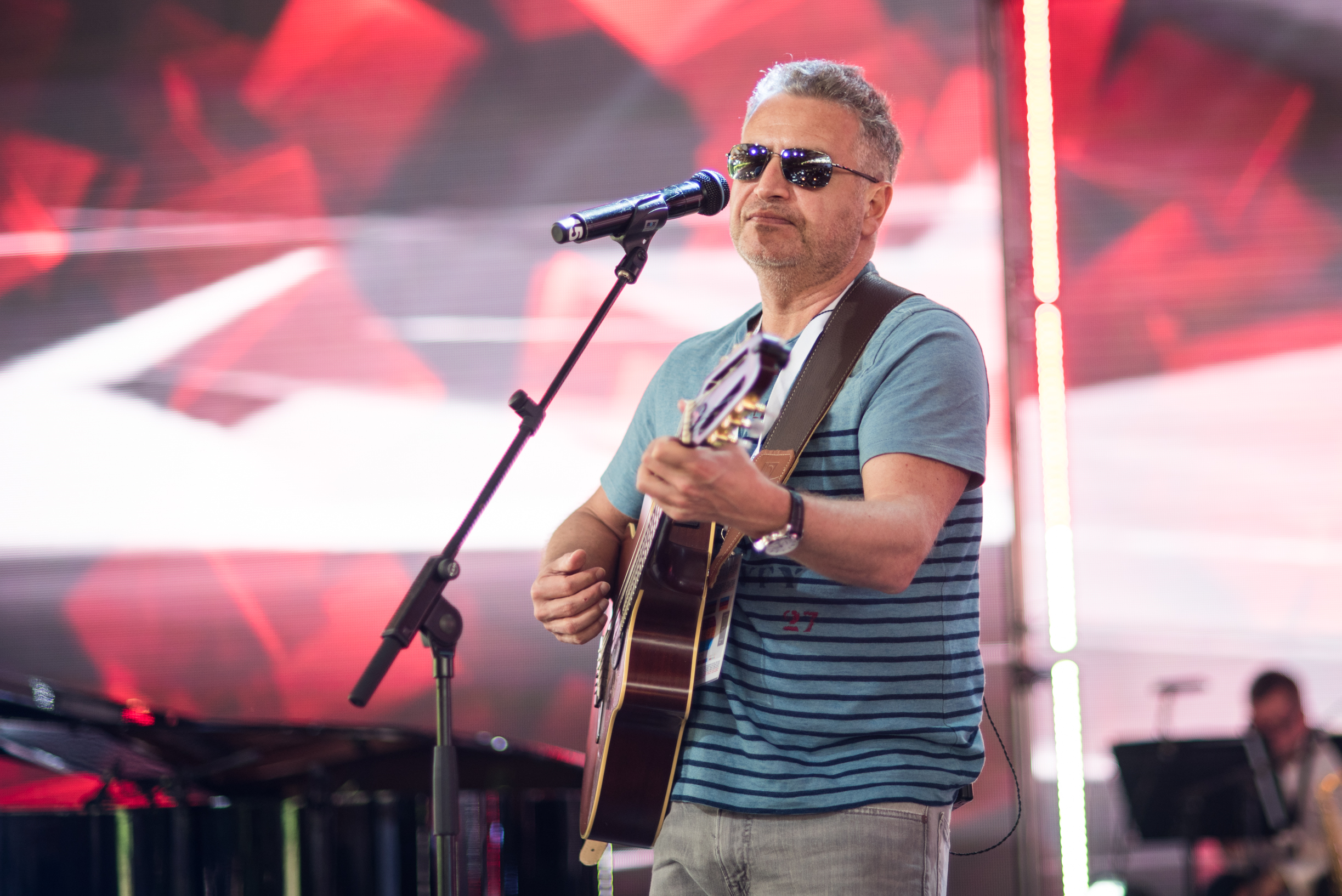
Leonid Agutin

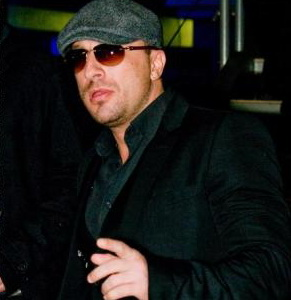
Dmitry Nagiev

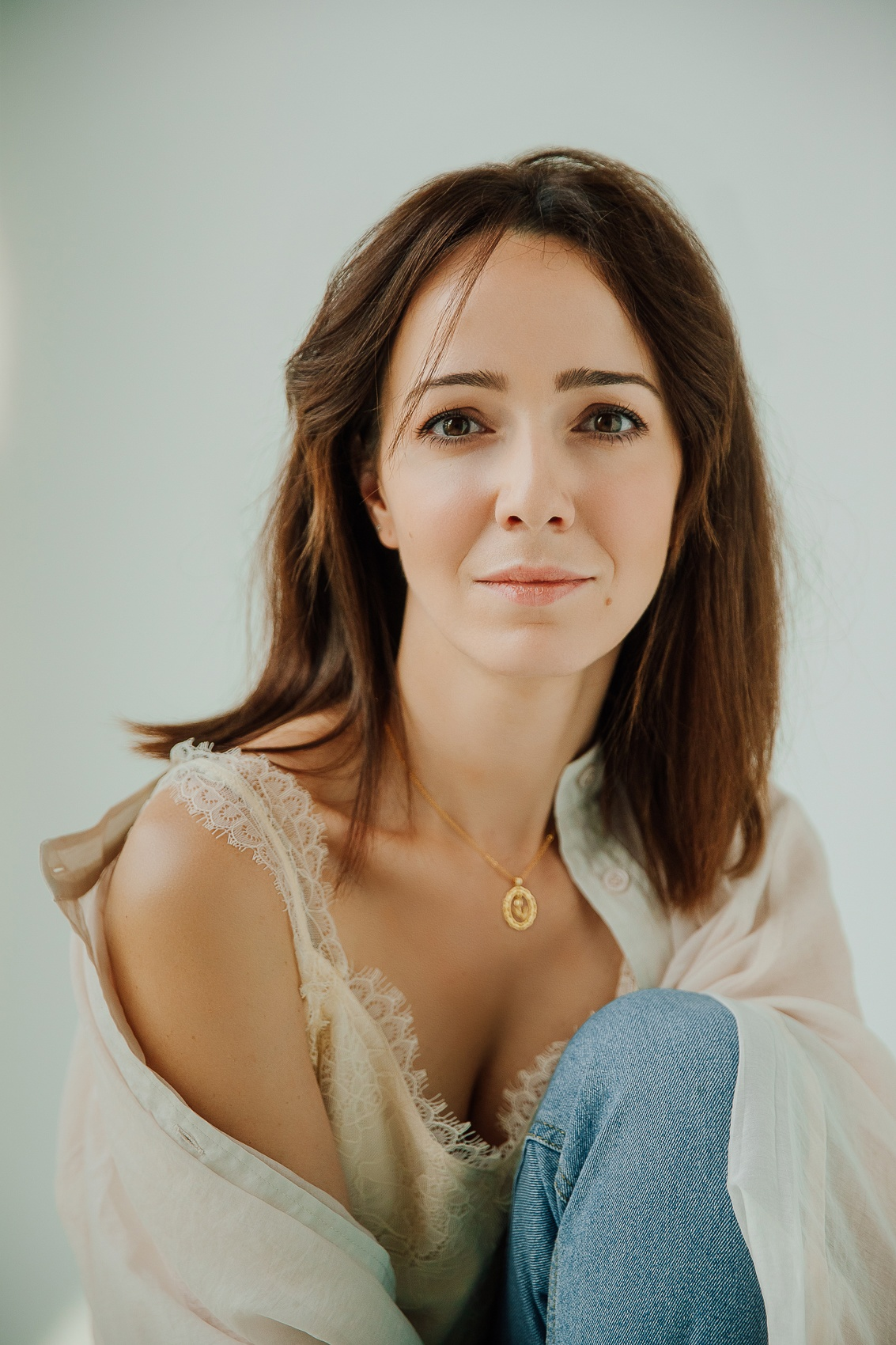
Valeriya Lanskaya

Dima Bilan and Pelageya are joined by Leonid Agutin (The Voice coach), who replaced Maxim Fadeev. Presenter Dmitry Nagiev is joined by Valeriya Lanskaya, who replaced Anastasia Chevazhevskaya.

== Teams ==
Colour key

- Winner
- Runner-up
- Third place
- Eliminated in the Final
- Eliminated in Live Extra round
- Eliminated in the Battle rounds

Coaches	Top 45 Artists				
Dima Bilan	Danil Pluzhnikov	Yaroslava Degtyaryova	Mariya Panyukova	Larisa Grigoryeva	Alexander Filin
Dima Bilan	Damir Nurutdinov	Alexandra Boldareva	Ekaterina Osintseva	Helena Meraai	Alexandra Mostovyak
Dima Bilan	Elizaveta Kabaeva	Ivena Rabotova	Mariya Borovkova	Arina Mironova	Maksim Churmanteev
Pelageya	Taisiya Podgornaya	Azer Nasibov	Vsevolod Rudakov	Milana Mirzakhanyan	Anna Moshkorina
Pelageya	Dmitryy Kondakov	Arseniy Sobolkov	Anastasiya Dmitrachkova	Alina Izotova	Madina Saidazimova
Pelageya	Nonna Eganyan	Ilya Litvinov	Veniamin Nurgaleev	Mariya Parotikova	Vladimir Chernoklinov
Leonid Agutin	Rayana Aslanbekova	Eva Timush	Marsel Sabirov	Alexandra Nekhay	Kirill Skripnik
Leonid Agutin	Elina Arsenina	Mariya Zhuravlyova	Artyom Kolesnikov & Yuliya Sirinko	Yuliya Kondrashenko	Maryana Mostovyak
Leonid Agutin	Yaroslav Buravchenko	Mariya Znatnova	Kseniya Ponomarenko	Egor Revskiy	Darya Atamanovskaya
Note: Italicized names are stolen contestants (who were eliminated in the Sing-offs, but were stolen in the Live Extra round and advanced to the Final).

== Blind auditions ==
Colour key

✔	Coach pressed "I WANT YOU" button
	Artist defaulted to a coach's team
	Artist picked a coach's team
	Artist eliminated with no coach pressing their button

The winners of the previous seasons and the coaches performed "Have You Ever Seen the Rain?" at the start of the show.

Episode	Order	Artist	Age	Hometown	Song	Coach's and artist's choices		
Episode	Order	Artist	Age	Hometown	Song	Bilan	Pelageya	Agutin
Episode 1 (February 20, 2016)	1	Yaroslava Degtyaryova	7	Gukovo, Rostov Oblast	"Кукушка"	✔	✔	—
Episode 1 (February 20, 2016)	2	Azer Nasibov	13	Syasstroy, Leningrad Oblast	"Maybe I Maybe You"	✔	✔	✔
Episode 1 (February 20, 2016)	3	Alina Izotova	14	Alexandrov, Vladimir Oblast	"Выйду на улицу"	—	✔	—
Episode 1 (February 20, 2016)	4	Arseniy Sobolkov	8	Samara	"O sole mio"	—	✔	—
Episode 1 (February 20, 2016)	5	Yuliya Kondrashenko	12	Moscow	"Sunny"	—	—	✔
Episode 1 (February 20, 2016)	6	Danil Borisenko	13	Volgograd	"Эта музыка"	—	—	—
Episode 1 (February 20, 2016)	7	Kseniya Ponomarenko	8	Izhevsk	"А знаешь, всё ещё будет!"	—	✔	✔
Episode 1 (February 20, 2016)	8	Milena Bartsits	11	Moscow	"I Believe I Can Fly"	—	—	—
Episode 1 (February 20, 2016)	9	Egor Revskiy	12	Kaluga	"Great Balls of Fire"	✔	—	✔
Episode 1 (February 20, 2016)	10	Sofiya Ivanova	7	Moscow	"Если в сердце живёт любовь"	—	—	—
Episode 1 (February 20, 2016)	11	Alexandra Mostovyak	12	Romashkovo, Moscow Oblast	"Stand Up for Love"	✔	—	—
Episode 2 (February 26, 2016)	1	Elizaveta Kabaeva	11	Moscow	"She Taught Me to Yodel"	✔	—	—
Episode 2 (February 26, 2016)	2	Kirill Skripnik	12	Krasnoyarsk	"Ай-яй-яй"	—	✔	✔
Episode 2 (February 26, 2016)	3	Milana Pavlova	12	Kazan	"Think"	—	—	—
Episode 2 (February 26, 2016)	4	Veniamin Nurgaleev	7	Ufa	"Santa Lucia"	✔	✔	—
Episode 2 (February 26, 2016)	5	Milana Mirzakhanyan	12	Krasnodar	"Звезда"	—	✔	—
Episode 2 (February 26, 2016)	6	Maryana Mostovyak	7	Romashkovo, Moscow Oblast	"Smile"	✔	✔	✔
Episode 2 (February 26, 2016)	7	Daniil Repin	12	Novosibirsk	"Billionaire"	—	—	—
Episode 2 (February 26, 2016)	8	Milaslava Breenkova	10	Samara	"Любо, братцы, любо"	—	—	—
Episode 2 (February 26, 2016)	9	Alexandra Boldareva	13	Rostov-on-Don	"Nature Boy"	✔	—	—
Episode 2 (February 26, 2016)	10	Dmitriy Andreev	14	Mytishchi, Moscow Oblast	"Не слышно шуму городского"	—	—	—
Episode 2 (February 26, 2016)	11	Eva Timush	13	Chișinău, Moldova	"Je t'aime"	✔	✔	✔
Episode 3 (March 4, 2016)	1	Dmitriy Kondakov	9	Kaluga	"Дожди"	—	✔	—
Episode 3 (March 4, 2016)	2	Darya Atamanovskaya	13	Moscow	"Wrecking Ball"	✔	—	✔
Episode 3 (March 4, 2016)	3	Taisiya Podgornaya	7	Kushchyovskaya, Krasnodar Krai	"Красно солнышко"	—	✔	—
Episode 3 (March 4, 2016)	4	Larisa Grigoryeva	13	Moscow	"Molitva"	✔	✔	✔
Episode 3 (March 4, 2016)	5	Damir Nurutdinov	14	Almetyevsk, Tatarstan	"Vivo per lei"	✔	—	—
Episode 3 (March 4, 2016)	6	Kseniya Levchik	8	Minsk, Belarus	"Клён"	—	—	—
Episode 3 (March 4, 2016)	7	Rayana Aslanbekova	14	Grozny, Chechnya	"Dernière danse"	—	—	✔
Episode 3 (March 4, 2016)	8	Arseniy Kulikov	11	Moscow	"Красный конь"	—	—	—
Episode 3 (March 4, 2016)	9	Mariya Znatnova	14	Kaluga	"Euphoria"	—	✔	✔
Episode 3 (March 4, 2016)	10	Alexander Filin	9	Moscow	"Love Runs Out"	✔	—	—
Episode 3 (March 4, 2016)	11	Svetlana Kazakova	12	Moscow	"Memory"	—	—	—
Episode 4 (March 11, 2016)
Episode 4 (March 11, 2016)	1	Ekaterina Ivanova	12	Novokuznetsk, Kemerovo Oblast	"Cheek to Cheek"	—	—	—
Episode 4 (March 11, 2016)	2	Vsevolod Rudakov	7	Moscow	"Вдоль по Питерской"	✔	✔	✔
Episode 4 (March 11, 2016)	3	Artyom Kolesnikov & Yuliya Sirinko	12/11	Voronezh	"Une vie d'amour"	✔	—	✔
Episode 4 (March 11, 2016)	4	Aksiniya Saprykina	8	Moscow	"Quizás, Quizás, Quizás"	—	—	—
Episode 4 (March 11, 2016)	5	Danil Pluzhnikov	14	Sochi, Krasnodar Krai	"Два орла"	✔	—	—
Episode 4 (March 11, 2016)	6	Madina Saidazimova	14	Tashkent, Uzbekistan	"O mio babbino caro"	✔	✔	✔
Episode 4 (March 11, 2016)	7	Elina Arsenina	12	Moscow	"Ленинградский рок-н-ролл"	—	—	✔
Episode 4 (March 11, 2016)	8	Anastasiya Vorobyova	9	Saint Petersburg	"L-O-V-E"	—	—	—
Episode 4 (March 11, 2016)	9	Mariya Borovkova	11	Tula	"Верба"	✔	—	—
Episode 4 (March 11, 2016)	10	Artur Peters	10	Moscow	"Je veux"	—	—	—
Episode 4 (March 11, 2016)	11	Mariya Panyukova	8	Novomoskovsk, Tula Oblast	"Still Loving You"	✔	✔	—
Episode 5 (March 18, 2016)
Episode 5 (March 18, 2016)	1	Ilya Litvinov	11	Blagoveshchensk	"Синяя вечность"	✔	✔	✔
Episode 5 (March 18, 2016)	2	Nonna Eganyan	11	Saint Petersburg	"Non, je ne regrette rien"	—	✔	✔
Episode 5 (March 18, 2016)	3	Arina Mironova	9	Moscow	"Diamonds"	✔	—	—
Episode 5 (March 18, 2016)	4	Alexandra Nekhay	13	Minsk, Belarus	"Кукушка"	✔	✔	✔
Episode 5 (March 18, 2016)	5	Yaroslav Buravchenko	12	Veliky Novgorod	"Тро-ло-ло"	—	—	✔
Episode 5 (March 18, 2016)	6	Anna Budkova	13	Zheleznodorozhny, Moscow Oblast	"В лунном сиянии"	—	—	—
Episode 5 (March 18, 2016)	7	Ivena Rabotova	10	Plovdiv, Bulgaria	"Who's Lovin' You"	✔	✔	✔
Episode 5 (March 18, 2016)	8	Ilya Putintsev	14	Volgodonsk, Rostov Oblast	"Mamma"	—	—	—
Episode 5 (March 18, 2016)	9	Margarita Vorobyova	8	Novosibirsk	"Лучший город Земли"	—	—	—
Episode 5 (March 18, 2016)	10	Vladimir Chernoklinov	14	Noginsk, Moscow Oblast	"Maybe I Maybe You"	—	✔	—
Episode 5 (March 18, 2016)	11	Ekaterina Osintseva	11	Izhevsk	"Mamma Knows Best"	✔	—	✔
Episode 6 (March 25, 2016)
Episode 6 (March 25, 2016)	1	Artur Amirov	14	Kazan	"Whataya Want from Me"	—	—	—
Episode 6 (March 25, 2016)	2	Maksim Churmanteev	7	Moscow	"Эта музыка"	✔	✔	—
Episode 6 (March 25, 2016)	3	Margarita Stryukova	8	Chelyabinsk	"Kolorowe jarmarki"	—	—	—
Episode 6 (March 25, 2016)	4	Marsel Sabirov	11	Ufa	"Jamaica"	✔	✔	✔
Episode 6 (March 25, 2016)	5	Mariya Zhuravlyova	11	Moscow	"Something's Got a Hold on Me"	✔	—	✔
Episode 6 (March 25, 2016)	6	Anastasia Dmitrachkova	7	Mogilev, Belarus	"Padam, padam..."	—	✔	Team full
Episode 6 (March 25, 2016)	7	Maya Egorova	13	Tsivilsk, Chuvashia	"Я вернусь"	—	—	Team full
Episode 6 (March 25, 2016)	8	Maksimilian Khikhinashvili	12	Moscow	"Volare"	—	—	Team full
Episode 6 (March 25, 2016)	9	Helena Meraai	12	Minsk, Belarus	"Fallin'"	✔	—	Team full
Episode 6 (March 25, 2016)	10	Arina Erokhina	10	Omsk	"Зурбаган"	Team full	—	Team full
Episode 6 (March 25, 2016)	11	Anna Moshkorina	12	Velikie Luki, Pskov Oblast	"Nothing Else Matters" / "Despedida"	Team full	✔	Team full
Episode 6 (March 25, 2016)	12	Mariya Parotikova	13	Yegoryevsk, Moscow Oblast	"Вдоль по Питерской"	Team full	✔	Team full

== The Battles ==
The Battles round started with the first half of episode 7 and ended with the first half of episode 9 (broadcast on April 1, 8, 15, 2016). Contestants who win their battle will advance to the Sing-off rounds.

Colour key

Artist won the Battle and advanced to the Sing-offs
Artist was eliminated

Episode	Coach	Order	Winner	Song	Losers	
Episode 7 (April 1, 2016)	Dima Bilan	1	Larisa Grigoryeva	"Shackles (Praise You)"	Helena Meraai	Arina Mironova
Episode 7 (April 1, 2016)	Dima Bilan	2	Mariya Panyukova	"Moscow Calling"	Ekaterina Osintseva	Mariya Borovkova
Episode 7 (April 1, 2016)	Dima Bilan	3	Danil Pluzhnikov	"Дороги"	Damir Nurutdinov	Elizaveta Kabaeva
Episode 7 (April 1, 2016)	Dima Bilan	4	Alexander Filin	"Can't Feel My Face"	Alexandra Mostovyak	Maksim Churmanteev
Episode 7 (April 1, 2016)	Dima Bilan	5	Yaroslava Degtyaryova	"Все пути ангелов"	Alexandra Boldareva	Ivena Rabotova
Episode 8 (April 8, 2016)	Pelageya	1	Milana Mirzakhanyan	"Песня о птицах" / "Гаю-гаю"	Alina Izotova	Mariya Parotikova
Episode 8 (April 8, 2016)	Pelageya	2	Vsevolod Rudakov	"Imagine"	Veniamin Nurgaleev	Anastasiya Dmitrachkova
Episode 8 (April 8, 2016)	Pelageya	3	Anna Moshkorina	"Штиль"	Vladimir Chernoklinov	Madina Saidazimova
Episode 8 (April 8, 2016)	Pelageya	4	Taisiya Podgornaya	"It's Oh So Quiet"	Dmitriy Kondakov	Nonna Eganyan
Episode 8 (April 8, 2016)	Pelageya	5	Azer Nasibov	"L'elisir d'amore"	Arseniy Sobolkov	Ilya Litvinov
Episode 9 (April 15, 2016)	Leonid Agutin	1	Kirill Skripnik	"Without You"	Maryana Mostovyak	Darya Atamanovskaya
Episode 9 (April 15, 2016)	Leonid Agutin	2	Rayana Aslanbekova	"Скрипка-лиса"	Elina Arsenina	Yaroslav Buravchenko
Episode 9 (April 15, 2016)	Leonid Agutin	3	Alexandra Nekhay	"Льдинка"	Yuliya Kondrashenko	Egor Revskiy
Episode 9 (April 15, 2016)	Leonid Agutin	4	Eva Timush	"Beautiful"	Mariya Zhuravlyova	Mariya Znatnova
Episode 9 (April 15, 2016)	Leonid Agutin	5	Marsel Sabirov	"Hallelujah"	Artyom Kolesnikov & Yuliya Sirinko	Kseniya Ponomarenko

== The Sing-offs ==
The Sing-offs round started with the second half of episode 7 and ended with the second half of episode 9 (broadcast on April 1, 8, 15, 2016). Contestants who was saved by their coaches will advance to the Final.

Colour key

Artist was saved by his/her coach and advanced to the Final
Artist was eliminated but received the Comeback and advanced to the Live Extra round

Episode	Coach	Order	Artist	Song	Result
Episode 7 (April 1, 2016)	Dima Bilan	1	Larisa Grigoryeva	"Molitva"	Advanced to the Live Extra round
Episode 7 (April 1, 2016)	Dima Bilan	2	Mariya Panyukova	"Still Loving You"	Advanced to the Live Extra round
Episode 7 (April 1, 2016)	Dima Bilan	3	Danil Pluzhnikov	"Два орла"	Advanced to the Final
Episode 7 (April 1, 2016)	Dima Bilan	4	Alexander Filin	"Love Runs Out"	Advanced to the Live Extra round
Episode 7 (April 1, 2016)	Dima Bilan	5	Yaroslava Degtyaryova	"Кукушка"	Advanced to the Final
Episode 8 (April 8, 2016)	Pelageya	1	Milana Mirzakhanyan	"Звезда"	Advanced to the Live Extra round
Episode 8 (April 8, 2016)	Pelageya	2	Vsevolod Rudakov	"Вдоль по Питерской"	Advanced to the Live Extra round
Episode 8 (April 8, 2016)	Pelageya	3	Anna Moshkorina	"Nothing Else Matters" / "Despedida"	Advanced to the Live Extra round
Episode 8 (April 8, 2016)	Pelageya	4	Taisiya Podgornaya	"Красно солнышко"	Advanced to the Final
Episode 8 (April 8, 2016)	Pelageya	5	Azer Nasibov	"Maybe I Maybe You"	Advanced to the Final
Episode 9 (April 15, 2016)	Leonid Agutin	1	Kirill Skripnik	"Ай-яй-яй"	Advanced to the Live Extra round
Episode 9 (April 15, 2016)	Leonid Agutin	2	Rayana Aslanbekova	"Dernière danse"	Advanced to the Final
Episode 9 (April 15, 2016)	Leonid Agutin	3	Alexandra Nekhay	"Кукушка"	Advanced to the Live Extra round
Episode 9 (April 15, 2016)	Leonid Agutin	4	Eva Timush	"Je t'aime"	Advanced to the Final
Episode 9 (April 15, 2016)	Leonid Agutin	5	Marsel Sabirov	"Jamaica"	Advanced to the Live Extra round

== Live shows ==
=== Week 1: Live Extra round ===
Each coach saved three artists who were eliminated in the Sing-offs. Playoff results were voted on in real time. Nine artists sang live and six of them were eliminated by the end of the night. Three saved artists advanced to the Final.

Colour key

Artist was saved by the Public's votes and advanced to the Final
Artist was eliminated

Episode	Coach	Order	Artist	Song	Public's vote	Result
Episode 10 (April 22, 2016)	Dima Bilan	1	Larisa Grigoryeva	"Поднимись над суетой"	16.1%	Eliminated
Episode 10 (April 22, 2016)	Dima Bilan	2	Alexander Filin	"Angels"	24.1%	Eliminated
Episode 10 (April 22, 2016)	Dima Bilan	3	Mariya Panyukova	"Солнышко"	59.8%	Advanced to the Final
Episode 10 (April 22, 2016)	Pelageya	4	Milana Mirzakhanyan	"Broken Vow"	37.4%	Eliminated
Episode 10 (April 22, 2016)	Pelageya	5	Vsevolod Rudakov	"Лизавета"	41.2%	Advanced to the Final
Episode 10 (April 22, 2016)	Pelageya	6	Anna Moshkorina	"Останусь"	21.4%	Eliminated
Episode 10 (April 22, 2016)	Leonid Agutin	7	Kirill Skripnik	"Locked Out of Heaven"	13.9%	Eliminated
Episode 10 (April 22, 2016)	Leonid Agutin	8	Alexandra Nekhay	"Ищу тебя"	33.2%	Eliminated
Episode 10 (April 22, 2016)	Leonid Agutin	9	Marsel Sabirov	"Вернись в Сорренто"	52.9%	Advanced to the Final

Non-competition performances
Order	Performer	Song
10.1	Vladimir Presnyakov and Team Dima Bilan (Larisa Grigoryeva, Alexander Filin, and Mariya Panyukova)	"Я в облака"
10.2	Uma2rman and Team Pelageya (Milana Mirzakhanyan, Vsevolod Rudakov, and Anna Moshkorina)	"Прасковья"
10.3	Soso Pavliashvili and Team Leonid Agutin (Kirill Skripnik, Alexandra Nekhay, and Marsel Sabirov)	"Небо на ладони"

=== Week 2: Final ===
Colour key

Artist was saved by the Public's votes and advanced to the Super Final
Artist was eliminated

Episode	Coach	Order	Artist	Song	Public's vote	Result
Episode 11 (April 29)
Episode 11 (April 29)	Final					
Episode 11 (April 29)	Leonid Agutin	1	Rayana Aslanbekova	"Pardonnez-moi ce caprice d'enfant"	68.4%	Advanced
Episode 11 (April 29)	Leonid Agutin	2	Marsel Sabirov	"I've Got to Use My Imagination"	9.8%	Eliminated
Episode 11 (April 29)	Leonid Agutin	3	Eva Timush	"Солнце"	21.8%	Eliminated
Episode 11 (April 29)	Pelageya	4	Azer Nasibov	"Caruso"	28.1%	Eliminated
Episode 11 (April 29)	Pelageya	5	Taisiya Podgornaya	"Оренбургский пуховый платок"	47.4%	Advanced
Episode 11 (April 29)	Pelageya	6	Vsevolod Rudakov	"Ария Мистера Икс"	23.9%	Eliminated
Episode 11 (April 29)	Dima Bilan	7	Yaroslava Degtyaryova	"Звенит январская вьюга"	26.8%	Eliminated
Episode 11 (April 29)	Dima Bilan	8	Mariya Panyukova	"Hello"	6.9%	Eliminated
Episode 11 (April 29)	Dima Bilan	9	Danil Pluzhnikov	"Нас бьют, мы летаем"	66.3%	Advanced
Episode 11 (April 29)	Super Final					
Episode 11 (April 29)	Leonid Agutin	1	Rayana Aslanbekova	"Не тревожь мне душу, скрипка"	28.1%	Runner-up
Episode 11 (April 29)	Pelageya	2	Taisiya Podgornaya	"Ёжик резиновый"	10.2%	Third Place
Episode 11 (April 29)	Dima Bilan	3	Danil Pluzhnikov	"Я свободен"	61.7%	Winner

Non-competition performances
Order	Performer	Song
11.1	Top 9 and Alisa Kozhikina & Sabina Mustaeva	"Ci sarà"
11.2	Leonid Agutin and his team (Rayana Aslanbekova, Marsel Sabirov, and Eva Timush)	"Музыкант"
11.3	Pelageya and her team (Azer Nasibov, Taisiya Podgornaya, and Vsevolod Rudakov)	"Думы окоянные"
11.4	Dima Bilan and his full team of the season (Yaroslava Degtyaryova, Mariya Panyukova, Danil Pluzhnikov and others)	"Я тебя помню"
11.5	Danil Pluzhnikov (winner)	"Я свободен"
11.6	Top 45 artists of the season	"Здесь проигравших нет"

== Reception ==
=== Ratings ===
Episode		Original airdate	Production	Time slot (UTC+3)	Audience		Source
Episode		Original airdate	Production	Time slot (UTC+3)	Rating	Share	Source
1	"The Blind Auditions Premiere"	February 20, 2016	301	Saturday 9:30 p.m.	8.9	26.5	
2	"The Blind Auditions, Part 2"	February 26, 2016	302	Friday 9:30 p.m.	7.6	22.0	
3	"The Blind Auditions, Part 3"	March 4, 2016	303	Friday 9:30 p.m.	7.7	23.2	
4	"The Blind Auditions, Part 4"	March 11, 2016	304	Friday 9:30 p.m.	8.4	24.5	
5	"The Blind Auditions, Part 5"	March 18, 2016	305	Friday 9:30 p.m.	8.3	23.7	
6	"The Blind Auditions, Part 6"	March 25, 2016	306	Friday 9:30 p.m.	8.2	25.5	
7	"The Battles and the Sing-offs Premiere"	April 1, 2016	307	Friday 9:30 p.m.	8.2	24.9	
8	"The Battles and the Sing-offs, Part 2"	April 8, 2016	308	Friday 9:30 p.m.	7.8	24.2	
9	"The Battles and the Sing-offs, Part 3"	April 15, 2016	309	Friday 9:30 p.m.	7.1	22.9	
10	"Live Playoffs"	April 22, 2016	310	Friday 9:30 p.m.	6.4	21.1	
11	"Live Season Final"	April 29, 2016	311	Friday 9:30 p.m.	7.8	27.6	
