= The Voice Kids (Russian TV series) season 4 =

The Voice Kids
- Season 4
- Presented by: Dmitry Nagiev; Svetlana Zeynalova
- Coaches: Dima Bilan; Nyusha; Valery Meladze
- Winner: Elizaveta Kachurak
- Winning coach: Dima Bilan
- Runner-up: Deniza Khekilaeva

Release
- Original network: Channel One
- Original release: 17 February – 28 April 2017

Season chronology
- ← Previous; Season 3 Next → Season 5

The fourth season of the Russian reality talent show The Voice Kids premiered on 17 February 2017 on Channel One. Dmitry Nagiev returns as the show's presenter, Svetlana Zeynalova replaced Valeriya Lanskaya as a co-presenter. Dima Bilan returns as coach while Nyusha and Valery Meladze replaced Pelageya and Leonid Agutin as coaches.

Elizaveta Kachurak was announced the winner on April 28, 2017, marking Dima Bilan's second win as a coach, thus expanding his winning streak to two seasons in a row. Dima Bilan became the second coach after Maxim Fadeev to win more than one season. Elizaveta Kachurak became the second stolen artist (in Live Extra round) to win, following Sabina Mustaeva in season 2.

== Coaches and presenters ==
The Voice Kids season 4 coaches

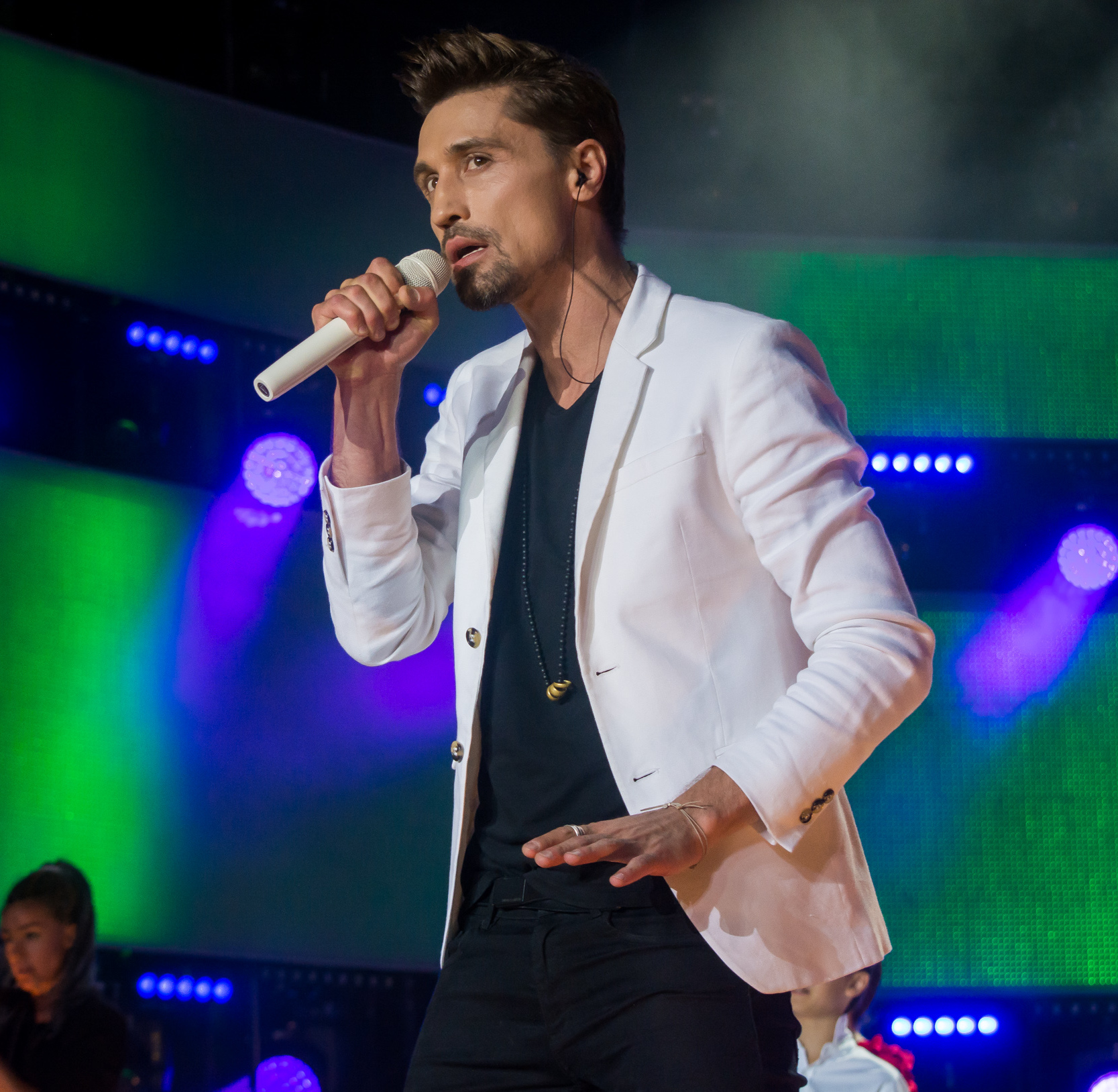
Dima Bilan

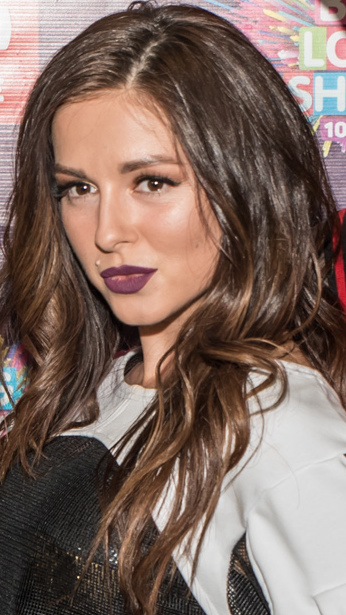
Nyusha

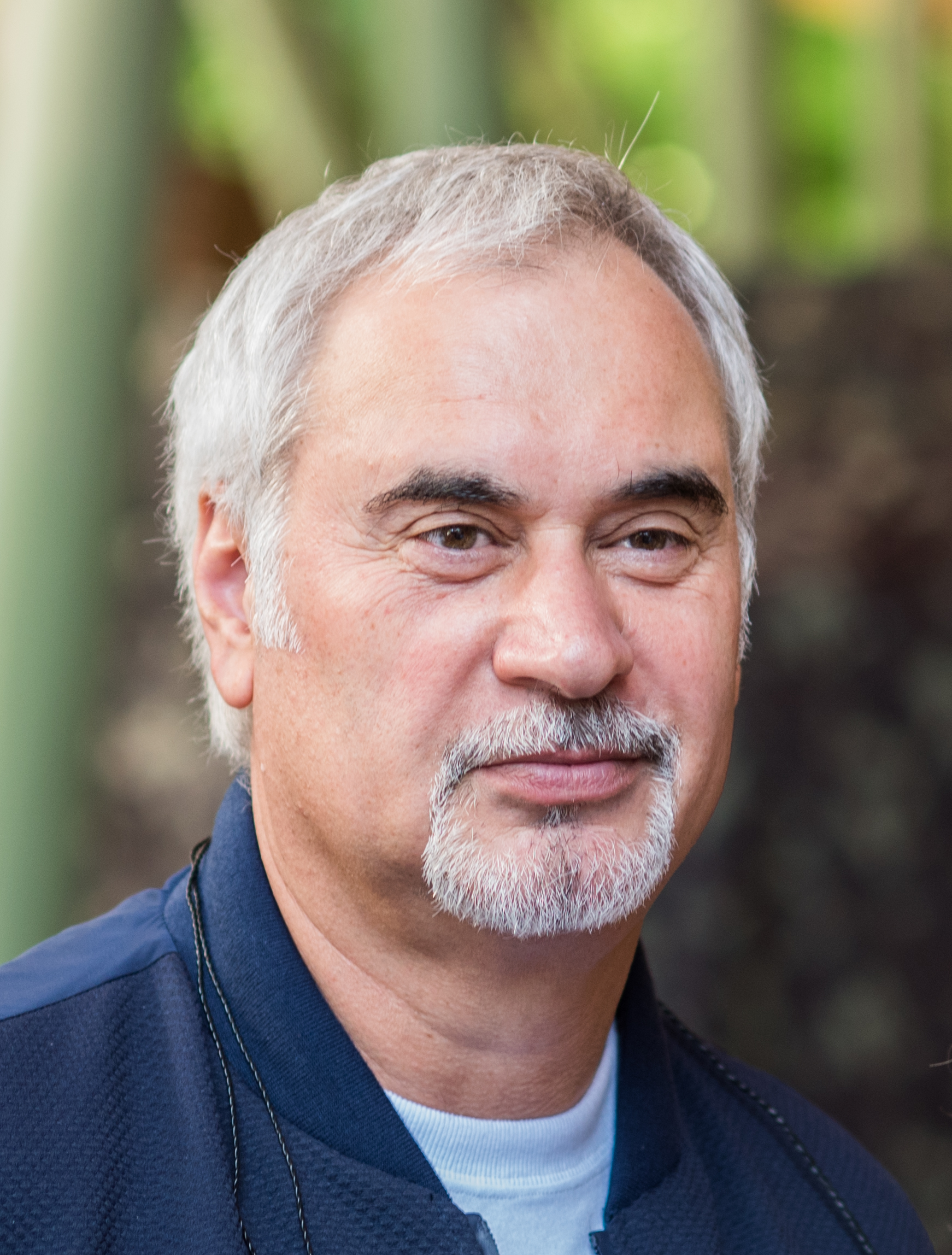
Valery Meladze

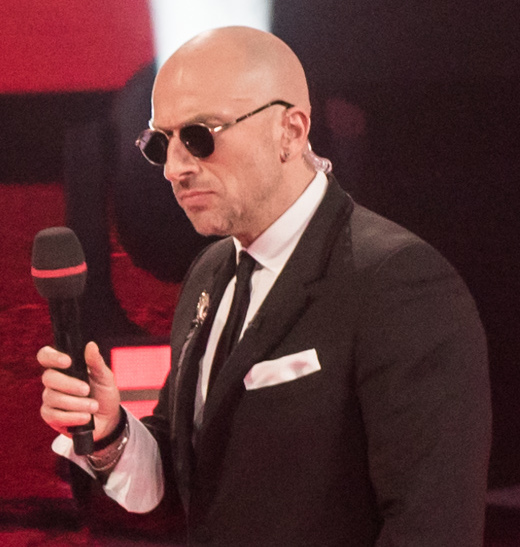
Dmitry Nagiev

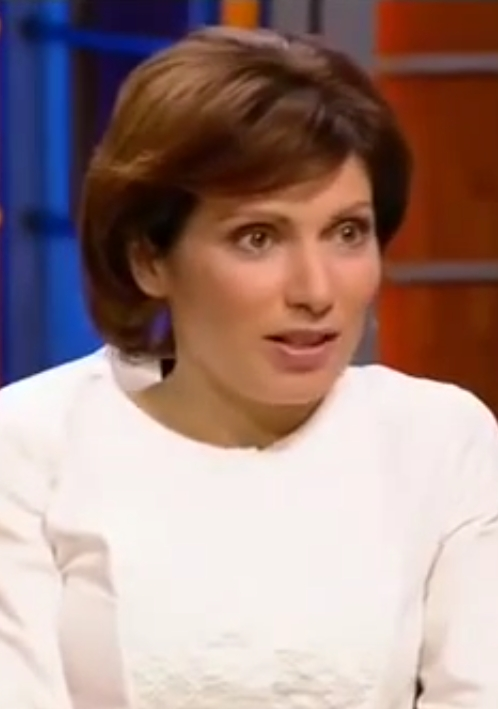
Svetlana Zeynalova

Dima Bilan is joined by Nyusha and Valery Meladze, who replaced Pelageya and Leonid Agutin. Dmitry Nagiev is joined by Svetlana Zeynalova, who replaced Valeriya Lanskaya.

== Teams ==
Colour key

- Winner
- Runner-up
- Third place
- Eliminated in the Final
- Eliminated in Live Playoffs
- Eliminated in the Battle rounds

Coaches	Top 45 Artists				
Dima Bilan					
Dima Bilan	Elizaveta Kachurak	Alisa Golomysova	Snezhana Shin	Milana Pak	Nikita Vlasenko
Dima Bilan	Polina Dmitrenko	Elizaveta & Sofya Kaymakovy	Yury Maksimenkov	Karina Ignatyan	Valeriya Solomykina
Dima Bilan	Ai-kys Kyrgys	Veronika Ustimova	Artyom Seyranyan	Ramiz Rulyov	Fyodor Khvastov
Nyusha					
Nyusha	Alina Sansyzbay	Yulianna Beregoy	Eva Medved	Viktoriya Drobina	Daniel Ismailov
Nyusha	Sofiya Myaukina	Sofya Fyodorova	Renata Ramazanova	Yana Kulikova	Nurlan Ismailov
Nyusha	Stasya Fyodorova	Alicia Kalista James	Alyona Dykhlina	Karine Megrabyan	Alexandra Davydova
Valery Meladze					
Valery Meladze	Deniza Khekilaeva	Alexander Dudko	Stefaniya Sokolova	Levon Galstyan	Elizaveta Kuklishina
Valery Meladze	Aksiniya Saprykina	Mariya Zakharova	Roman Trifonov	Mikhail Moskalyov	Snezhana Shiryaeva
Valery Meladze	Valeriy Sukharev	Danil Musin	Madina Mukhamedshina	Alina Zhiganova	Alexandra Apraksina
Note: Italicized names are stolen contestants (who were eliminated in the Sing-offs, but were stolen in the Live Extra round and advanced to the Final).

== Blind auditions ==
Colour key

✔	Coach pressed "I WANT YOU" button
	Artist defaulted to a coach's team
	Artist picked a coach's team
	Artist eliminated with no coach pressing their button

The coaches performed "Sing" at the start of the show.

Episode	Order	Artist	Age	Hometown	Song	Coach's and artist's choices		
Episode	Order	Artist	Age	Hometown	Song	Bilan	Nyusha	Meladze
Episode 1 (February 17)	1	Ai-kys Kyrgys	14	Kyzyl	"I Will Survive"	✔	✔	—
Episode 1 (February 17)	2	Alexander Dudko	9	Novy Urengoy, YaNAO	"Крылатые качели"	✔	✔	✔
Episode 1 (February 17)	3	Diana Ankudinova	13	Tolyatti, Samara Oblast	"Jodel-time"	—	—	—
Episode 1 (February 17)	4	Valeriya Solomykina	14	Lipetsk	"Полюшка"	✔	—	—
Episode 1 (February 17)	5	Mikhail Moskalyov	13	Vitebsk, Belarus	"Granada"	—	✔	✔
Episode 1 (February 17)	6	Viktoriya Korobkova	14	Chekhov, Moscow Oblast	"Tomorrow Never Dies"	—	—	—
Episode 1 (February 17)	7	Viktoriya Drobina	15	Moscow	"Бросай"	—	✔	—
Episode 1 (February 17)	8	Eva Medved	7	Moscow	"Hit the Road Jack"	✔	✔	✔
Episode 1 (February 17)	9	Yana Kulikova	13	Orenburg	"Sweet People"	—	✔	—
Episode 1 (February 17)	10	Vadim Gladkov	13	Krasnokamsk	"Я подозвал коня"	—	—	—
Episode 1 (February 17)	11	Alina Zhiganova	12	Moscow	"Greedy"	—	—	✔
Episode 2 (February 22)	1	Eva Sukmanova	10	Orenburg	"А он мне нравится"	—	—	—
Episode 2 (February 22)	2	Sofiya Myaukina	14	Mozhaysk, Moscow Oblast	"Варто чi ни" ("Я люблю тільки тебе")	—	✔	—
Episode 2 (February 22)	3	Artyom Seyranyan	13	Krasnodar	"Highway to Hell"	✔	✔	—
Episode 2 (February 22)	4	Alicia Kalista James	13	Kostroma	"Реченька"	—	✔	—
Episode 2 (February 22)	5	Alexandra Davydova	8	Moscow	"Lullaby of Birdland"	✔	✔	✔
Episode 2 (February 22)	6	Ilya Lazarev	7	Nizhny Novgorod	"Я свободен"	—	—	—
Episode 2 (February 22)	7	Danila Krivov	13	Kaluga	"Everybody's Handsome Child"	—	—	—
Episode 2 (February 22)	8	Milana Pak	10	Tashkent, Uzbekistan	"Stone Cold"	✔	—	—
Episode 2 (February 22)	9	Ilya Groshev	11	Shatura, Moscow Oblast	"Испанское болеро"	—	—	—
Episode 2 (February 22)	10	Madina Mukhamedshina	15	Kazan	"If I Ain't Got You"	—	—	✔
Episode 2 (February 22)	11	Valeriy Sukharev	13	Moscow	"Я буду помнить"	✔	—	✔
Episode 3 (March 3)	1	Yuri Maksimenkov	7	Omsk	"Симона"	✔	—	—
Episode 3 (March 3)	2	Snezhana Shiryaeva	14	Sochi, Krasnodar Krai	"Something New"	✔	✔	✔
Episode 3 (March 3)	3	Ivan Korovin	13	Moscow	"Обернитесь"	—	—	—
Episode 3 (March 3)	4	Veronika Ustimova	13	Ulyanovsk	"Hurt"	✔	—	—
Episode 3 (March 3)	5	Karine Megrabyan	7	Moscow	"Я деревенская"	—	✔	—
Episode 3 (March 3)	6	Arina Khan	14	Almaty, Kazakhstan	"Chandelier"	—	—	—
Episode 3 (March 3)	7	Ramiz Rulyov	10	Saint Petersburg	"Santa Lucia"	✔	—	✔
Episode 3 (March 3)	8	Sofiya Feskova	7	Saint Petersburg	"Tell Me Why"	—	—	—
Episode 3 (March 3)	9	Alexandra Apraksina	14	Korolyov, Moscow Oblast	"Mercy"	—	—	✔
Episode 3 (March 3)	10	Elizaveta Kachurak	13	Kalach-na-Donu, Volgograd Oblast	"Любовь - волшебная страна"	✔	✔	—
Episode 3 (March 3)	11	Fyodor Khvastov	13	Primorsky Krai	"Amazing"	✔	—	—
Episode 4 (March 11)	1	Elizaveta Kuklishina	10	Simferopol, Ukraine	"Padam... Padam..."	—	✔	✔
Episode 4 (March 11)	2	Elizaveta Lebedeva	10	Kaliningrad	"Ты дарила мне розы"	—	—	—
Episode 4 (March 11)	3	Roman Trifonov	12	Aktarsk, Saratov Oblast	"Песенка Роберта"	—	—	✔
Episode 4 (March 11)	4	Elizaveta & Sofya Kaymakovy	8/11	Chelyabinsk	"Ваня"	✔	—	—
Episode 4 (March 11)	5	Alyona Dykhlina	13	Moscow	"Stayin' Alive"	—	✔	—
Episode 4 (March 11)	6	Ivan Yastrebov	14	Volokolamsk, Moscow Oblast	"Арго"	—	—	—
Episode 4 (March 11)	7	Alisa Golomysova	7	Bronnitsy, Moscow Oblast	"I Go to Sleep"	✔	✔	✔
Episode 4 (March 11)	8	Yuliya Martynova	13	Moscow	"Соловей"	—	—	—
Episode 4 (March 11)	9	Stefaniya Sokolova	11	Minsk, Belarus	"Белый снег"	—	✔	✔
Episode 4 (March 11)	10	Kseniya Neznamova	8	Moscow	"Hero"	—	—	—
Episode 4 (March 11)	11	Daniel Ismailov	13	Astrakhan	"I Believe I Can Fly"	—	✔	—
Episode 5 (March 17)	1	Deniza Khekilaeva	11	Nalchik, Kabardino-Balkaria	"Вера"	✔	✔	✔
Episode 5 (March 17)	2	Polina Dmitrenko	7	Tver	"And I'm Telling You"	✔	✔	—
Episode 5 (March 17)	3	Erik Arutyunyan	13	Odesa, Ukraine	"New York, New York"	—	—	—
Episode 5 (March 17)	4	Elizaveta Perminova	11	Izhevsk	"Летела гагара"	—	—	—
Episode 5 (March 17)	5	Nikita Vlasenko	12	Minsk, Belarus	"Звёздочка моя ясная"	✔	—	—
Episode 5 (March 17)	6	Renata Ramazanova	11	Vladimir	"Ария Мины"	✔	✔	—
Episode 5 (March 17)	7	Karina Ignatyan	10	Kaluga	"Just the Two of Us"	✔	—	—
Episode 5 (March 17)	8	Sofya Fyodorova	14	Moscow	"New York State of Mind"	✔	✔	—
Episode 5 (March 17)	9	Danil Musin	12	Troitsk, Chelyabinsk Oblast	"Адажио"	—	—	✔
Episode 5 (March 17)	10	Emi Kumamoto	8	Kyoto, Japan	"А знаешь, всё ещё будет!.."	—	—	—
Episode 5 (March 17)	11	Aksiniya Saprykina	9	Moscow	"Moon River"	—	—	✔
Episode 6 (March 24)	1	Alina Sansyzbay	9	Almaty, Kazakhstan	"Think"	—	✔	—
Episode 6 (March 24)	2	Stasya Fyodorova	12	Lobnya, Moscow oblast	"Качает, качает"	—	✔	—
Episode 6 (March 24)	3	Grigoriy Turkin	11	Saint Petersburg	"Caruso"	—	—	—
Episode 6 (March 24)	4	Mariya Zakharova	9	Moscow	"Demons"	—	—	✔
Episode 6 (March 24)	5	Yulianna Beregoy	12	Orhei, Moldova	"Skyfall"	✔	✔	—
Episode 6 (March 24)	6	Snezhana Shin	12	Novorossiysk, Krasnodar Krai	"Я падаю в небо"	✔	—	—
Episode 6 (March 24)	7	Levon Galstyan	10	Yerevan, Armenia	"Spider-Man"	Team full	✔	✔
Episode 6 (March 24)	8	Valeriya Berkovskaya	12	Moscow	"Найти меня"	Team full	—	Team full
Episode 6 (March 24)	9	Sofiya Ermak	15	Abakan	"Derniere dance"	Team full	—	Team full
Episode 6 (March 24)	10	Darya Shcherbakova	12	Saransk	"Обещание"	Team full	—	Team full
Episode 6 (March 24)	11	Nurlan Ismailov	11	Naberezhnye Chelny, Tatarstan	"Позвони"	Team full	✔	Team full

== The Battles ==
The Battles round started with the first half of episode 7 and ended with the first half of episode 9 (broadcast on 31 March 2017; on 7, 14 April 2017). Contestants who win their battle will advance to the Sing-off rounds.

Colour key

Artist won the Battle and advanced to the Sing-offs
Artist was eliminated

Episode	Coach	Order	Winner	Song	Losers	
Episode 7 (March 31)	Nyusha	1	Eva Medved	"Коляда"	Alexandra Davydova	Karine Megrabyan
Episode 7 (March 31)	Nyusha	2	Daniel Ismailov	"Ты уйдёшь"	Alyona Dykhlina	Alicia Kalista James
Episode 7 (March 31)	Nyusha	3	Alina Sansyzbay	"Rockabye"	Stasya Fyodorova	Nurlan Ismailov
Episode 7 (March 31)	Nyusha	4	Yulianna Beregoy	"Я не отступлю"	Yana Kulikova	Renata Ramazanova
Episode 7 (March 31)	Nyusha	5	Viktoriya Drobina	"Bang Bang"	Sofya Fyodorova	Sofiya Myaukina
Episode 8 (April 7)	Valery Meladze	1	Deniza Khekilaeva	"Love Me Again"	Alexandra Apraksina	Alina Zhiganova
Episode 8 (April 7)	Valery Meladze	2	Levon Galstyan	"Мечтатели"	Danil Musin	Valeriy Sukharev
Episode 8 (April 7)	Valery Meladze	3	Stefaniya Sokolova	"Oh! Darling"	Madina Mukhamedshina	Snezhana Shiryaeva
Episode 8 (April 7)	Valery Meladze	4	Alexander Dudko	"Первым делом - самолёты"	Mikhail Moskalyov	Roman Trifonov
Episode 8 (April 7)	Valery Meladze	5	Elizaveta Kuklishina	"На дискотеку"	Mariya Zakharova	Aksiniya Saprykina
Episode 9 (April 14)	Dima Bilan	1	Milana Pak	"The Time of My Life"	Fyodor Khvastov	Ramiz Rulyov
Episode 9 (April 14)	Dima Bilan	2	Nikita Vlasenko	"Не опускай глаз"	Artyom Seyranyan	Veronika Ustimova
Episode 9 (April 14)	Dima Bilan	3	Snezhana Shin	"Hands to Myself"	Ai-kys Kyrgys	Valeriya Solomykina
Episode 9 (April 14)	Dima Bilan	4	Elizaveta Kachurak	"Грею счастье"	Karina Ignatyan	Elizaveta & Sofya Kaymakovy
Episode 9 (April 14)	Dima Bilan	5	Alisa Golomysova	"What's Love Got to Do with It"	Yury Maksimenkov	Polina Dmitrenko

== The Sing-offs ==
The Sing-offs round started with the second half of episode 7 and ended with the second half of episode 9 (broadcast on 31 March 2017; on 7, 14 April 2017). Contestants who was saved by their coaches will advance to the Final.

Colour key

Artist was saved by his/her coach and advanced to the Final
Artist was eliminated but received the Comeback and advanced to the Live Extra round

Episode	Coach	Order	Artist	Song	Result
Episode 7 (March 31)	Nyusha	1	Eva Medved	"Hit the Road Jack"	Advanced to the Live Extra round
Episode 7 (March 31)	Nyusha	2	Daniel Ismailov	"I Believe I Can Fly"	Advanced to the Live Extra round
Episode 7 (March 31)	Nyusha	3	Alina Sansyzbay	"Think"	Advanced to the Final
Episode 7 (March 31)	Nyusha	4	Yulianna Beregoy	"Skyfall"	Advanced to the Final
Episode 7 (March 31)	Nyusha	5	Viktoriya Drobina	"Бросай"	Advanced to the Live Extra round
Episode 8 (April 7)	Valery Meladze	1	Deniza Khekilaeva	"Вера"	Advanced to the Final
Episode 8 (April 7)	Valery Meladze	2	Levon Galstyan	"Spider-Man"	Advanced to the Live Extra round
Episode 8 (April 7)	Valery Meladze	3	Stefaniya Sokolova	"Белый снег"	Advanced to the Final
Episode 8 (April 7)	Valery Meladze	4	Alexander Dudko	"Крылатые качели"	Advanced to the Live Extra round
Episode 8 (April 7)	Valery Meladze	5	Elizaveta Kuklishina	"Padam... Padam"	Advanced to the Live Extra round
Episode 9 (April 14)	Dima Bilan	1	Milana Pak	"Stone Cold"	Advanced to the Live Extra round
Episode 9 (April 14)	Dima Bilan	2	Nikita Vlasenko	"Звёздочка моя ясная"	Advanced to the Live Extra round
Episode 9 (April 14)	Dima Bilan	3	Snezhana Shin	"Падаю в небо"	Advanced to the Final
Episode 9 (April 14)	Dima Bilan	4	Elizaveta Kachurak	"Любовь - волшебная страна"	Advanced to the Live Extra round
Episode 9 (April 14)	Dima Bilan	5	Alisa Golomysova	"I Go to Sleep"	Advanced to the Final

== Live shows ==
Colour key:

Artist was saved by the Public's votes
Artist was eliminated

=== Week 1: Live Extra round (April 21) ===
As with Season 2, each coach brought back three artists who was eliminated in the Sing-offs. Playoff results was voted on in real time. Nine artists sang live and six was eliminated by the end of the night. Three saved artists advanced to the Final.

Episode	Coach	Order	Artist	Song	Public's vote	Result
Episode 10 (April 21)	Valery Meladze	1	Levon Galstyan	"Sir Duke"	8.7%	Eliminated
Episode 10 (April 21)	Valery Meladze	2	Elizaveta Kuklishina	"Песня Звездочёта"	42.6%	Eliminated
Episode 10 (April 21)	Valery Meladze	3	Alexander Dudko	"Бабушка"	48.7%	Advanced
Episode 10 (April 21)	Nyusha	4	Viktoriya Drobina	"Сдаться ты всегда успеешь"	28.4%	Eliminated
Episode 10 (April 21)	Nyusha	5	Daniel Ismailov	"Wonderful Life"	22.3%	Eliminated
Episode 10 (April 21)	Nyusha	6	Eva Medved	"Помнишь, нас учили быть птицами"	49.3%	Advanced
Episode 10 (April 21)	Dima Bilan	7	Elizaveta Kachurak	"Душа"	48.4%	Advanced
Episode 10 (April 21)	Dima Bilan	8	Nikita Vlasenko	"Берега-небеса"	11.3%	Eliminated
Episode 10 (April 21)	Dima Bilan	9	Milana Pak	"Human"	40.3%	Eliminated

Non-competition performances
Order	Performer	Song
10.1	MBAND and Team Valery Meladze (Levon Galstyan, Elizaveta Kuklishina, Alexander Dudko)	"Она вернётся"
10.2	A-Studio and Team Nyusha (Viktoriya Drobina, Daniel Ismailov, Eva Medved)	"Папа, мама!"
10.3	Vera Brezhneva and Team Dima Bilan (Elizaveta Kachurak, Nikita Vlasenko, Milana Pak)	"Любовь спасёт мир"

=== Week 2: Final (April 28) ===
Episode	Coach	Order	Artist	Song	Public's vote	Result
Episode 11 (April 28)
Episode 11 (April 28)	Final					
Episode 11 (April 28)	Valery Meladze	1	Alexander Dudko	"Я милого узнаю по походке"	34%	Eliminated
Episode 11 (April 28)	Valery Meladze	2	Stefaniya Sokolova	"Времени нет"	16.1%	Eliminated
Episode 11 (April 28)	Valery Meladze	3	Deniza Khekilaeva	"Маэстро"	49.9%	Advanced
Episode 11 (April 28)	Nyusha	4	Eva Medved	"I Was Made for Lovin' You"	23.7%	Eliminated
Episode 11 (April 28)	Nyusha	5	Yulianna Beregoy	"Lupii"	33.6%	Eliminated
Episode 11 (April 28)	Nyusha	6	Alina Sansyzbay	"Шагай"	42.7%	Advanced
Episode 11 (April 28)	Dima Bilan	7	Snezhana Shin	"Внеорбитные"	24.1%	Eliminated
Episode 11 (April 28)	Dima Bilan	8	Elizaveta Kachurak	"Молитва"	49.9%	Advanced
Episode 11 (April 28)	Dima Bilan	9	Alisa Golomysova	"It's Not Right but It's Okay"	26%	Eliminated
Episode 11 (April 28)	Super Final					
Episode 11 (April 28)	Valery Meladze	1	Deniza Khekilaeva	"Мама"	37.5%	Runner-up
Episode 11 (April 28)	Nyusha	2	Alina Sansyzbay	"Queen of the Night"	15.9%	Third place
Episode 11 (April 28)	Dima Bilan	3	Elizaveta Kachurak	"Reflection"	46.6%	Winner

Non-competition performances
Order	Performer	Song
11.1	Danil Pluzhnikov	"Два орла"
11.2	Valery Meladze and his team (Alexander Dudko, Stefaniya Sokolova, and Deniza Khekilaeva)	"Девушки из высшего общества"
11.3	Nyusha and her team (Eva Medved, Yulianna Beregoy, and Alina Sansyzbay)	"Выбирать чудо"
11.4	Dima Bilan and his team (Snezhana Shin, Elizaveta Kachurak, and Alisa Golomysova)	"Написать тебе песню"
11.5	Elizaveta Kachurak (winner)	"Любовь - волшебная страна"
11.6	All artists of the 4th season	"Голос"

== Reception ==
=== Ratings ===
Episode		Original airdate	Production	Time slot (UTC+3)	Audience		Source
Episode		Original airdate	Production	Time slot (UTC+3)	Rating	Share	Source
1	"The Blind Auditions Premiere"	February 17, 2017	401	Friday 9:30 p.m.	8.1	23.9	
2	"The Blind Auditions, Part 2"	February 22, 2017	402	Wednesday 9:30 p.m.	7.2	21.4	
3	"The Blind Auditions, Part 3"	March 3, 2017	403	Friday 9:30 p.m.	7.0	20.8	
4	"The Blind Auditions, Part 4"	March 11, 2017	404	Saturday 9:20 p.m.	5.5	15.8	
5	"The Blind Auditions, Part 5"	March 17, 2017	405	Friday 9:30 p.m.	7.3	22.8	
6	"The Blind Auditions, Part 6"	March 24, 2017	406	Friday 9:30 p.m.	6.8	21.2	
7	"The Battles and the Sing-offs Premiere"	March 31, 2017	407	Friday 9:30 p.m.	6.8	21.4	
8	"The Battles and the Sing-offs, Part 2"	April 7, 2017	408	Friday 9:30 p.m.	5.7	18.7	
9	"The Battles and the Sing-offs, Part 3"	April 14, 2017	409	Friday 9:30 p.m.	6.0	19.4	
10	"Live Playoffs"	April 21, 2017	410	Friday 9:30 p.m.	5.1	17.3	
11	"Live Season Final"	April 28, 2017	411	Friday 9:30 p.m.	5.4	19.7	
