= Marteen (Russian singer) =

Russian singer (born 2003)

Mikhail Smirnov Михаил Смирнов
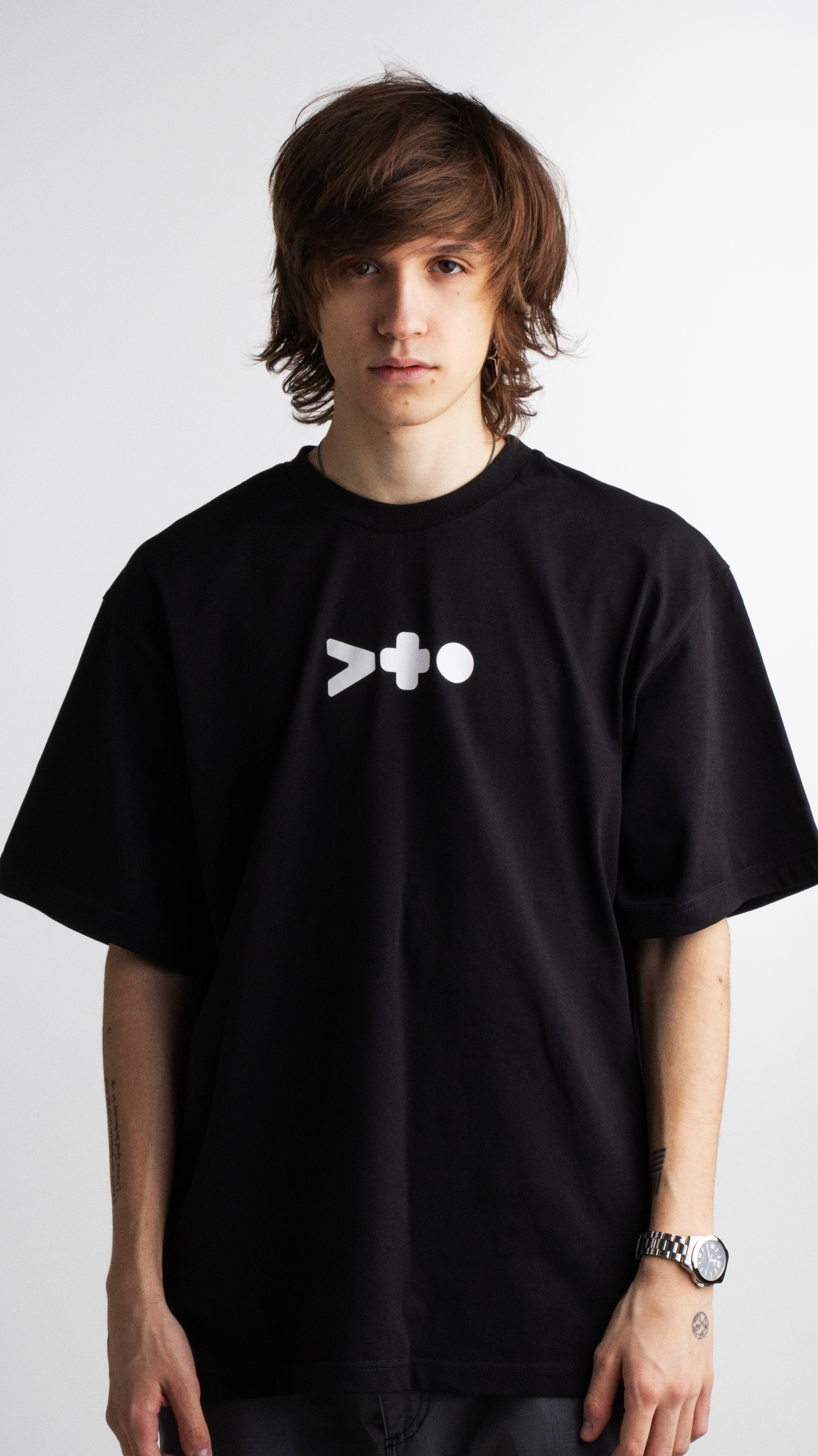
- Smirnov in 2025

Background information
- Born: Mikhail Alekseevich Smirnov; 30 April 2003 (age 23); Moscow, Russia
- Genres: Pop, hip-hop, alternative
- Occupations: Singer; record producer
- Instruments: Vocals, Ukulele, Electric Guitar
- Years active: 2013–present
- Labels: Zion Music, Lotus Music
- Website: http://mishasmirnov.ru

Mikhail Alekseevich (Misha) Smirnov (Russian: Михаи́л Алексе́евич (Ми́ша) Смирно́в; born 30 April 2003), known professionally as Marteen (Russian: Мартин) and previously as Misha Smirnov, is a Russian singer and record producer.

He represented Russia in the Junior Eurovision Song Contest 2015 with the song "Mechta" (Russian: Мечта, English: Dream), where he placed sixth. Smirnov was a finalist of the second season of The Voice Kids in Russia, an actor in the musical Ivanhoe, and a multiple grand prize winner of many Russian and international vocal competitions.

== Early life and career ==
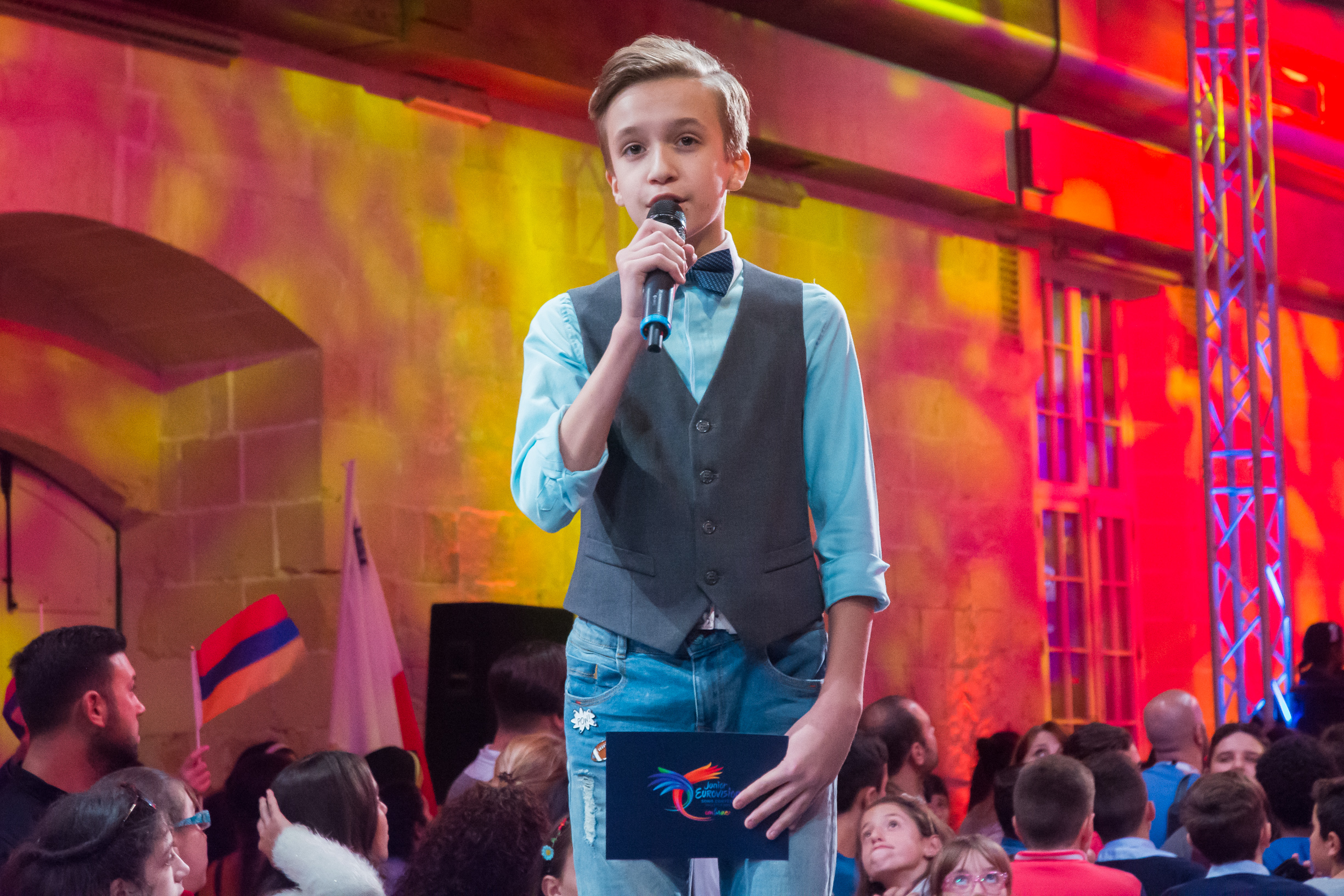
Smirnov announcing points during Junior Eurovision Song Contest 2016

=== Early beginnings ===
Smirnov was born on 30 April 2003 in Moscow into a family of mathematicians. When he was three years old, Smirnov suddenly began to stutter and his parents sent him to singing lessons as a therapy.

Smirnov has a huge number of Grand Prix wins at various Russian and international vocal competitions. He says that his major achievement is reaching the final of the TV show The Voice Kids (Голос. Дети).

=== Junior Eurovision 2015 and latter part of his career ===
In the Russian national final, Smirnov had to battle a series of strong female vocalists, many of whom rode the EDM trend with upbeat, danceable songs. However, he won and represented Russia at the Junior Eurovision Song Contest 2015, finishing sixth overall with 80 points.

Following his Junior Eurovision appearance, Smirnov hosted Goryachaya Desyatochka (Top 10) on Karusel from around 2015 to its cancellation in 2018.

After Junior Eurovision, Smirnov produced some songs on his own. In September 2017, he wrote the song "I Would Like To Know Everything" for Veronika Ustimova, with which she took second place in the Russian national selection for Junior Eurovision 2017.

On May 19, 2018, his debut album 15, consisting of previously released singles, was released. The album was named for the number of tracks included in it, and also for having taken 15 months to write the songs. In addition to solo songs, several tracks on it were recorded with colleagues on the season 4 of The Voice Kids, such as Arina Danilova, Alisa Kozhikina, and Kirill Skripnik. The original album was supposed to be called "Dreamerboy". "Dreamerboy is me, a boy who dreams of big concerts and a new elegant music," Smirnov explained about the name. However, due to the peculiarities of placement on digital distribution sites, the name was changed.

In 2021, he released his breakthrough EP Party Without Internet that features his most ambient musical style by producing himself.

In late 2022, he took the stage name "Marteen" and began releasing music again after a long hiatus. Smirnov explained the name choice in his Telegram channel, saying that his parents had wanted to name him after Depeche Mode songwriter Martin Gore. "I thought it was fate that they wanted to name me after a man who wrote songs all his life, and I decided that this name would be an ideal continuation of my solo work," he wrote.

On November 26, 2023, Smirnov held his first solo concert under the new stage name at a small club in Moscow, featuring acoustic versions of many of his songs. Tickets were in such high demand that the event organizers held a second concert on the same day.

On April 30, 2024, Smirnov held a second small concert in Moscow, celebrating his 21st birthday and performing in front of a sold-out crowd of fans.

=== Acting ===
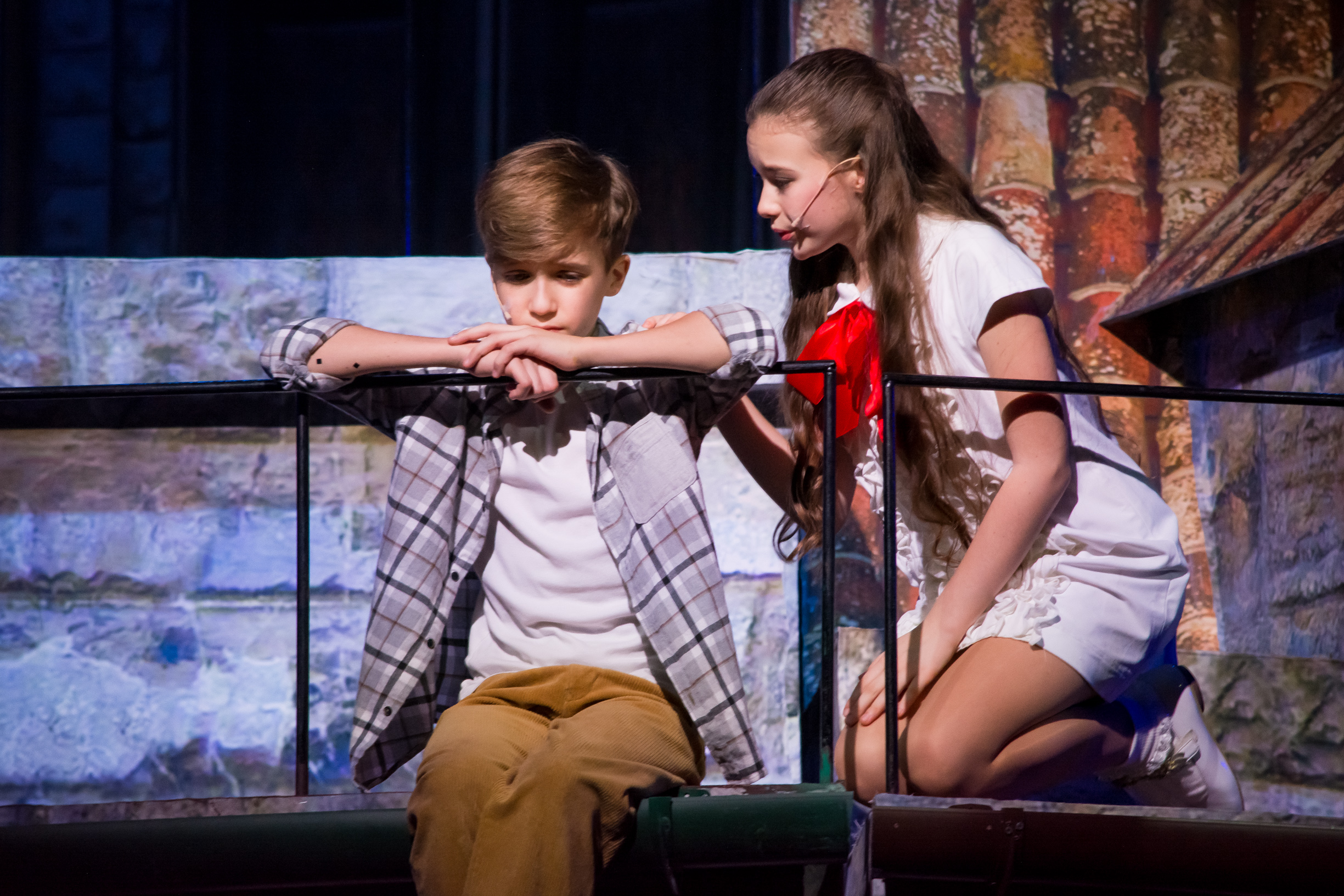
Smirnov and Ustimova on The Ballad of the Heart (2015)

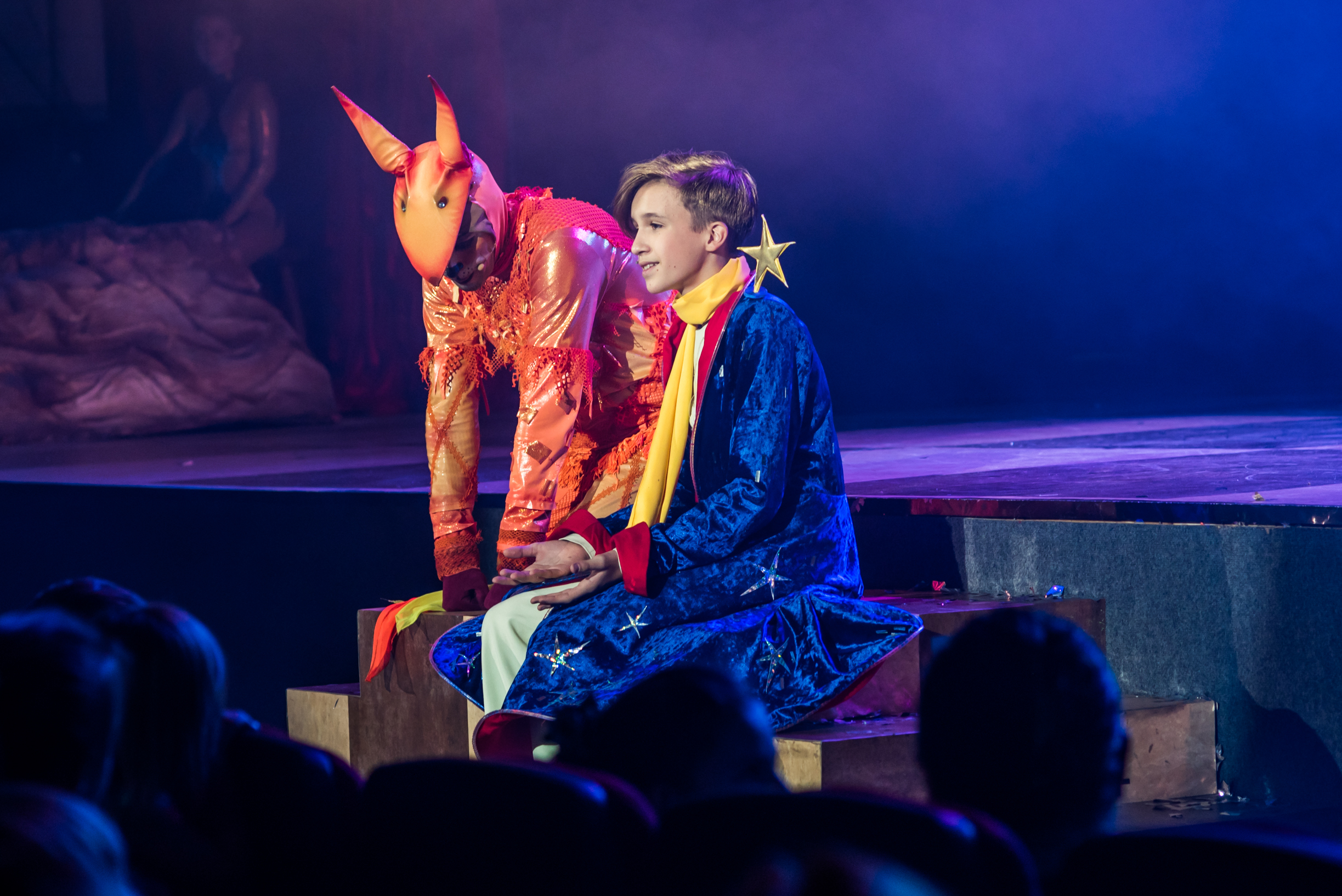
Smirnov in The Circus of Miracles (2018)

In 2012, Smirnov performed at the Moscow International House of Music in the role of Mowgli in the musical Мы Одной Крови (We Have One Blood).

In December 2015, the new musical Баллада о маленьком сердце (The Ballad of a Heart) premiered with Smirnov in the role of Alyoshka.

In 2016–17, he played Nikita in The Circus of Miracles at the Ivanhoe Theater presented the New Year show Волшебный подарок Деда Мороза (The Magic Gift of Santa Claus).

On September 30, 2017, he took on Цирке чудес (Circus of Miracles), the premiere of another show, in which he played the main role, the Little Prince. He appeared with Irina Ukhanova and Evgeny Egorov.

=== Music making and producing career ===
Aside from becoming a singer, Smirnov had been an ambient music producer during his free time and worked on a full-time professional scale since 2022. He also designed upbeat and lo-fi arrangements of tracks for other artists, bloggers and TikTokers such as HARU, NKI, Nikita Zlatoust, Mimimizhka, Sonya SLEEPY, Tyoma Waterfork, KIRILL FELIX, Liza Didkovskaya, Dasha Volosevich, Vika Korobkova, Sasha Filin, Eva Barats and Ivena Rabotova. He also makes musical scoring for film, television and short videos.

== Discography ==
=== Albums/EPs ===
- 15 / DREAMERBØY (2018)
- Silence (2018)
- Height (2019)
- Rhythm of Guitar (2019)
- Party Without Internet (2021)
- One More Day (2024)
- Poka leto ne konchilos' (2025)

=== Charted singles ===
List of charted singles, with selected chart positions
Title	Year	Peak chart positions	Album or EP
Title	Year	LAT Air.	Album or EP
"Ty sluchilas'"	2025	59	Poka leto ne konchilos'
"Ciao"	2026	46	Non-album single

=== Other charted songs ===
List of charted singles, with selected chart positions
Title	Year	Peak chart positions	Album or EP
Title	Year	RUS Stream.	Album or EP
"Ty sluchilas' (novogodnyaya)"	2025	69	S novym godom, ne zvoni mne

=== Singles ===
Year	Original title	English title	Release date	Album
2015	«Мечта» (Mechta)	"Dream"	13 September 2015	Non-album single
2016	«Наш дом» (Nash dom) (feat. Vyacheslav Mertsalov)	"Our Home"	29 April 2016	Non-album single
2017	«Парашют» (Parashyut)	"Parachute"	12 March 2017	15/DREAMERBØY
2017	«Виражи» (Virazhi)	"Bends"	23 April 2017	15/DREAMERBØY
2017	«Ночной изгой» (Nochnoy izgoy)	"Night Outcast"	13 May 2017	15/DREAMERBØY
2017	«Не хватает» (Ne khvatayet) (feat. Arina Danilova)	"Not Enough"	29 May 2017	15/DREAMERBØY
2017	«Описать тебя» (Opisat tebya)	"Describing You"	24 June 2017	15/DREAMERBØY
2017	«Прости» (Prosti)	"I'm Sorry"	15 July 2017	15/DREAMERBØY
2017	«Вечность» (Vechnost)	"Eternity"	5 August 2017	15/DREAMERBØY
2017	«03»	"03"	28 October 2017	15/DREAMERBØY
2017	«Убегай» (Ubegay)	"Run Away"	25 November 2017	15/DREAMERBØY
2017	«Были счастливы» (Byli schastlivy)	"We Were Happy"	30 December 2017	15/DREAMERBØY
2018	«Твоё имя» (Tvoyo imya)	"Your Name"	3 February 2018	15/DREAMERBØY
2018	«Одному не пройти» (Odnomu ne proyti) (feat. Kirill Skripnik)	"One Cannot Pass Through"	23 February 2018	15/DREAMERBØY
2018	«Луна» (Luna)	"Moon"	8 March 2018	15/DREAMERBØY
2018	«Ты далеко» (Ty daleko) (feat. Alisa Kozhikina)	"You Are Far"	29 April 2018	15/DREAMERBØY
2018	«Новые раны» (Novye rany)	"New Wounds"	23 September 2018	Silence
2018	«Не до меня» (Ne do menya)	"Not To Me"	30 December 2018	Height
2019	«Что скажут другие» (Chto skazhut drugiye)	"What Others Will Say"	29 March 2019	Height/Rhythm of Guitar
2019	«Под твоим окном» (Pod tvoim oknom)	"Under Your Window"	24 October 2019	Height/Rhythm of Guitar
2020	«Холод» (Kholod)	"Cold"	14 February 2020	Non-album single
2020	«Розы» (Rozy) (feat. Katya Adushkina)	"Roses"	13 March 2020	Non-album single
2020	«Твоих друзей» (Tvoikh druzyei)	"Your Friends"	29 May 2020	Non-album single
2020	«Память» (Pamyat)	"Memory"	26 June 2020	Non-album single
2020	«Оставила» (Ostavila)	"Left"	10 July 2020	Non-album single
2020	«Плакала» (Plakala)	"Crying"	20 October 2020	Non-album single
2022	«плачь» (plach)	"Cry"	2 December 2022	Non-album single
2022	«снегопадом» (snegopadom)	"Snowfall"	23 December 2022	Non-album single
2023	«аморе» (amore)	"Amore"	31 March 2023	Non-album single
2023	«тает» (tayet) (feat. ALLA)	"Melts"	27 June 2023	Non-album single
2023	«целый мир» (tselyy mir)	"Whole World"	21 July 2023	Non-album single
2023	«позову звёзды смотреть на тебя» (pozovu zvyozdy smotret na tebya)	"I Call The Stars To Look At You"	15 August 2023	Non-album single
2023	«одинокие квартиры» (odinokiye kvartiry) (feat. Nelly Mes)	"Lonely Apartments"	22 September 2023	Non-album single
2023	«зеркала» (zerkala)	"Mirrors"	17 October 2023	Non-album single
2023	«наверное невозможно» (navernoye nevozmozhno) (feat. mina)	"Probably Impossible"	20 October 2023	Popolam (Пополам)– mina EP
2023	«город» (gorod)	"City"	14 November 2023	Non-album single
2023	«зачеркни меня на память» (zacherkni menya na pamyat)	"Cross Me Out In Memory"	12 December 2023	Non-album single
2024	«выдыхаю в потолок свои мысли» (vydykhayu v potolok svoi mysli)	"Exhaling My Thoughts Into The Ceiling"	6 February 2024	Non-album single
2024	«холодом по спине» (kholodom po spinye) (feat. LOVV66)	"Coldness Down The Back"	16 February 2024	Non-album single
2024	«ведь никто не ждёт домой» (ved nikto ne zhdyot domoy)	"After All, No One Is Waiting At Home"	12 March 2024	Non-album single
2024	«тебя вспоминать» (tebya vspominat)	"Remember You"	23 April 2024	Non-album single
2024	«моя любовь» (moya lyubov)	"My Love"	31 May 2024	Non-album single
2024	«салют» (salyut)	"Fireworks"	5 July 2024	Non-album single
2024	«словно в париже» (slovno v parizhe)	"Like in Paris"	13 August 2024	Non-album single
2024	«в который раз» (v kotoryy raz)	"Once More"	27 September 2024	Non-album single

== Personal life ==
Smirnov writes poetry, plays football and composes music during his free time.

In 2019, he dated fellow The Voice Kids (Голос дети) contestant Arina Danilova, with whom he released the single "Not Enough" in 2017.

In early 2024, he began dating Russian TikToker Karine Azatova.

== Awards and nominations ==
Year	Award	Category	Result	Ref(s)
2020	Kids Choice Awards	Favorite Music Blogger (Russia)	Won	

Awards and achievements
Preceded by Alisa Kozhikina with "Dreamer"	Russia in the Junior Eurovision Song Contest; 2015	Succeeded by Water of Life Project with "Water of Life"
