= The Voice Kids (Russian TV series) season 2 =

The Voice Kids
- Season 2
- Presented by: Dmitry Nagiev; Anastasiya Chevazhevskaya
- Coaches: Dima Bilan; Pelageya; Maxim Fadeev
- Winner: Sabina Mustaeva
- Winning coach: Maxim Fadeev
- Runner-up: Evdokiya Malevskaya

Release
- Original network: Channel One
- Original release: 13 February – 17 April 2015

Season chronology
- ← Previous; Season 1 Next → Season 3

The second season of the Russian reality talent show The Voice Kids premiered on February 13, 2015 on Channel One. Dima Bilan, Pelageya and Maxim Fadeev returned as coaches. Dmitry Nagiev returned as the show's presenter, Anastasiya Chevazhevskaya replaced Natalia Vodianova as a co-presenter.

Sabina Mustaeva was announced the winner on April 17, 2015, marking Maxim Fadeev's second win as a coach, thus expanding his winning streak to two seasons in a row. Sabina became the first participant to win, getting to the Final from the new Live Extra round (Maxim Fadeev didn't choose her after The Sing-offs). All finalists getting to the Final from the Live Extra round.

== Coaches and presenters ==
The Voice Kids season 2 coaching panel and presenters

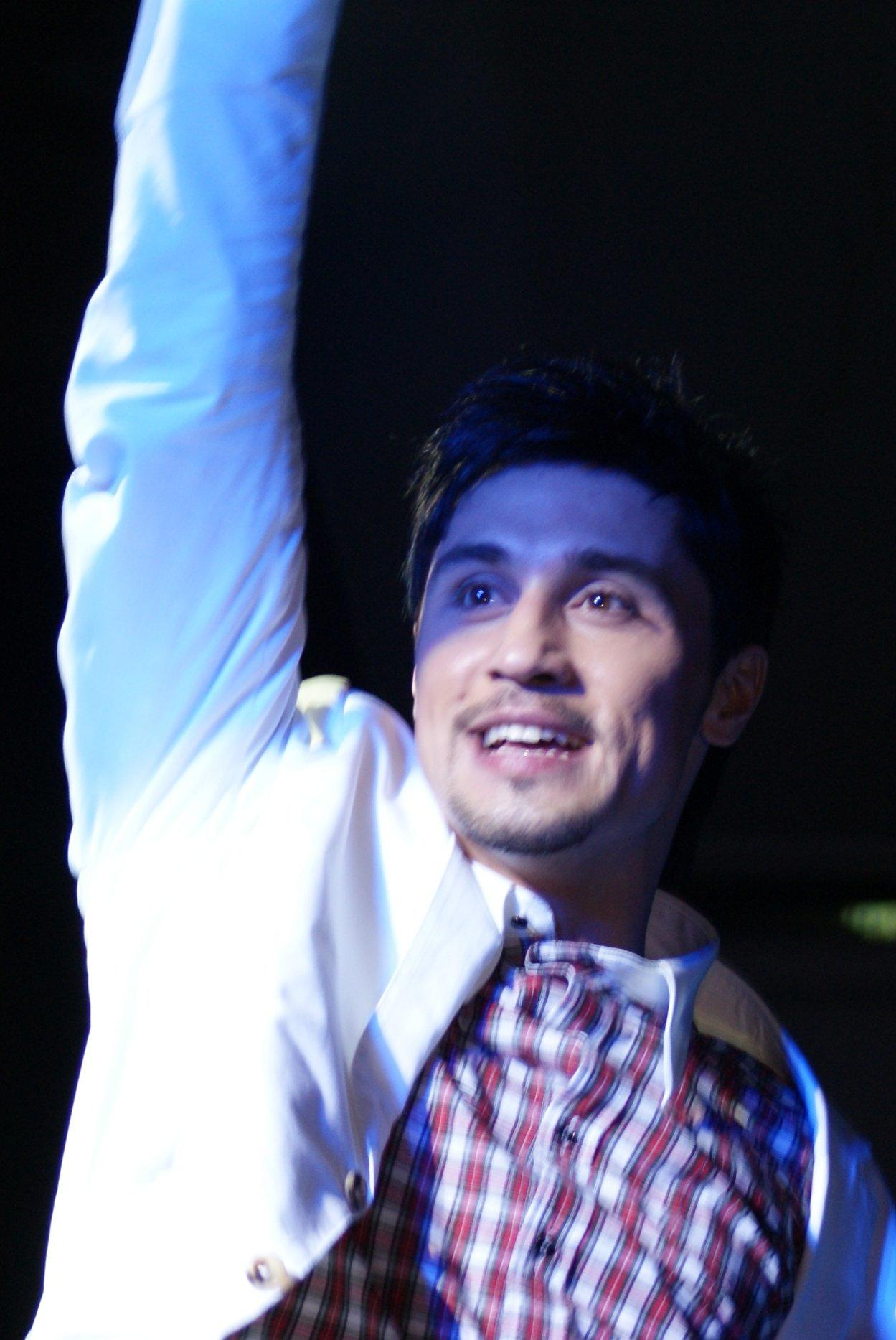
Dima Bilan

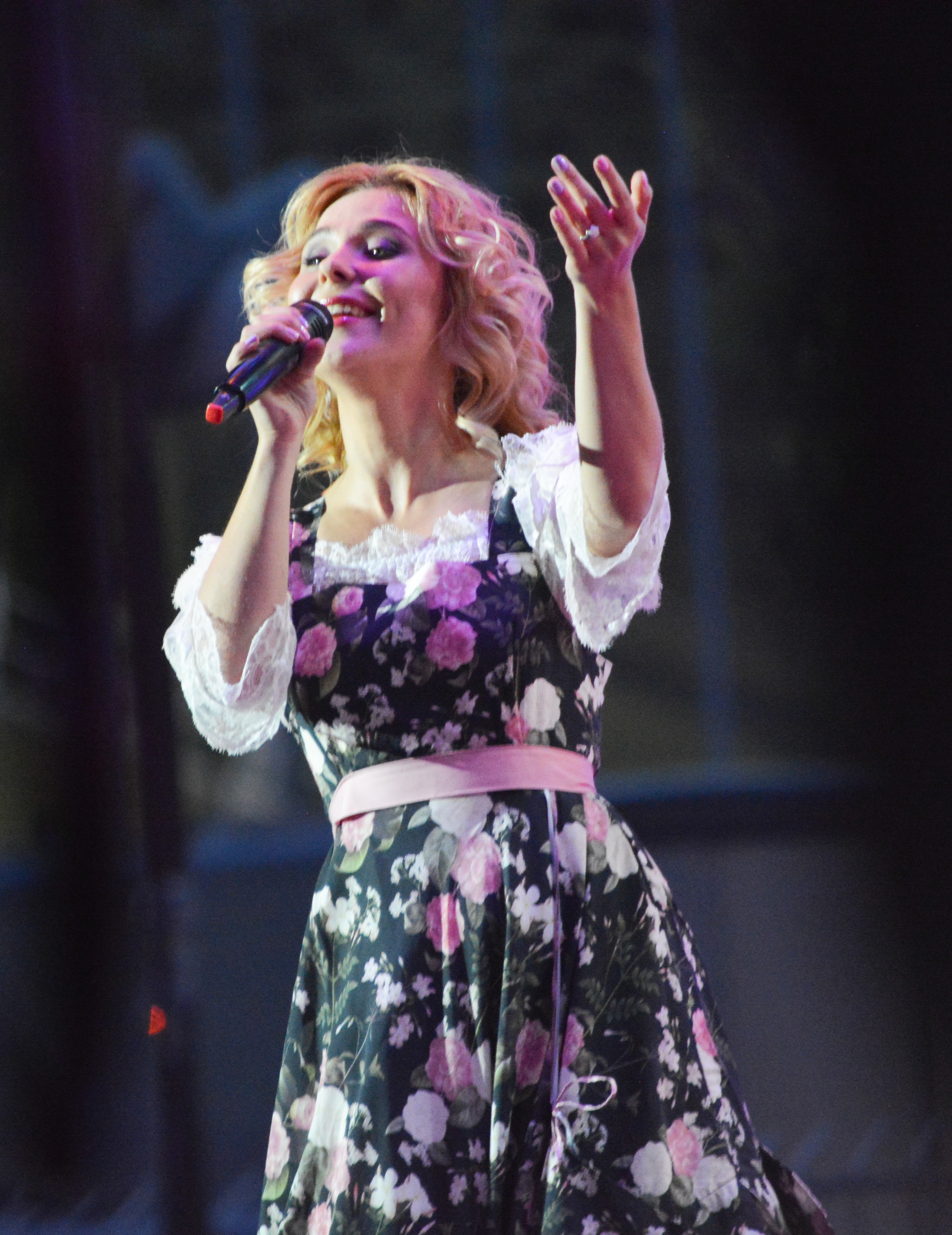
Pelageya

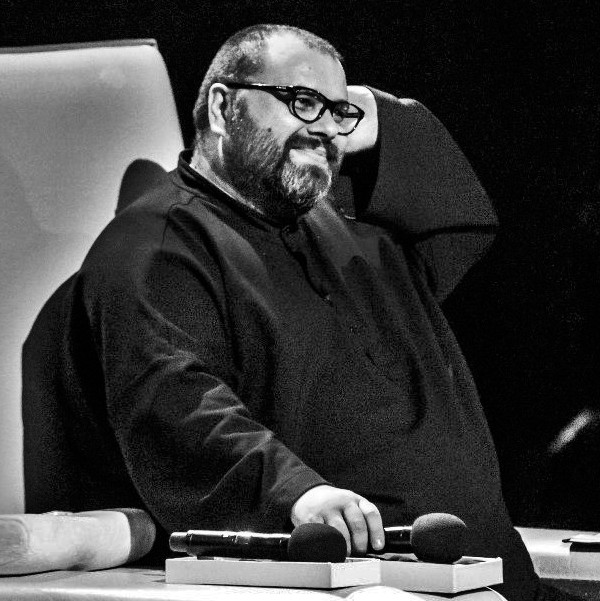
Maxim Fadeev

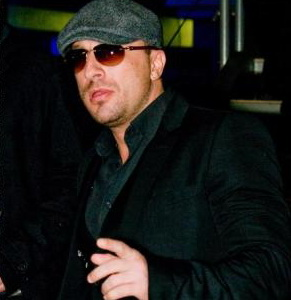
Dmitry Nagiev

Anastasiya Chevazhevskaya

Dima Bilan, Pelageya, and Maxim Fadeev return for their second season as coaches. Dmitry Nagiev return for his second season as a presenter. Anastasia Chevazhevskaya, who was in Dima Bilan's team from 1st season of «The Voice Russia» replaced Natalia Vodianova as a co-presenter.

== Teams ==
Colour key

- Winner
- Runner-up
- Third place
- Eliminated in the Final
- Eliminated in Live Extra round
- Eliminated in the Battle rounds

Coaches	Top 45 Artists				
Dima Bilan	Evdokiya Malevskaya	Alexey Zabugin	Sofiya Kvaratskheliya	Daniil Furman	Mariya Mirova
Dima Bilan	Valeriya Kozhemyakina	Yana Bon Su He	Sofya Feoktistova	Alina Mikhalchenko	Yuliya Asessorova
Dima Bilan	Ekaterina Prokudina	Alexander Savinov	Polina Romanova	Sofya Brovko	Egor Pyatnitsyn
Pelageya	Saida Mukhametzyanova	Matvey Semishkur	Mikhail Smirnov	Katrina Paula Diringa	Ekaterina Bizina
Pelageya	Renata Tazetdinova	Dmitriy Ustinov	Egor Grigoryev	Ranel Bogdanov	Mariya Stamova
Pelageya	Kamilla Kusova	Georgiy Dolgolenko	Andrey Kluban	Nailya Umitbaeva	Darya Shavrina
Maxim Fadeev	Sabina Mustaeva	Yaroslav Sokolikov	Eduard Rediko	Alina Arakelova	Elizaveta Marochkina
Maxim Fadeev	Polina Rudenko	Kseniya Kapustina	Nazeli Vareldzhyan	Kseniya Brakunova	Anastasiya Pershikova
Maxim Fadeev	Varvara Kistyaeva	Valeriya Samokhvalova	Anzhela Doronina	Khristina Chikhireva	Anastasiya Semyonova
Note: Italicized names are stolen constestans (who was eliminated in the Sing-offs, but was stolen in the Live Extra round and advanced to the Final).

== Blind auditions ==
Colour key

✔	Coach pressed "I WANT YOU" button
	Artist defaulted to a coach's team
	Artist picked a coach's team
	Artist eliminated with no coach pressing their button

The coaches performed "Ob-La-Di, Ob-La-Da" at the start of the show.

Episode	Order	Artist	Age	Hometown	Song	Coach's and artist's choices		
Episode	Order	Artist	Age	Hometown	Song	Bilan	Pelageya	Fadeev
Episode 1 (February 13, 2015)	1	Anzhela Doronina	8	Sarov, Nizhniy Novgorod Oblast	"Люба, Любочка"	✔	✔	✔
Episode 1 (February 13, 2015)	2	Darya Shavrina	11	Serpukhov, Moscow Oblast	"Melodramma"	✔	✔	—
Episode 1 (February 13, 2015)	3	Egor Pyatnitsyn	14	Saratov	"Whataya Want From Me"	✔	—	—
Episode 1 (February 13, 2015)	4	Kseniya Sotkina	10	Nizhniy Novgorod	"Я вернусь"	—	—	—
Episode 1 (February 13, 2015)	5	Kseniya Brakunova	12	Bryansk	"Простая песня"	✔	✔	✔
Episode 1 (February 13, 2015)	6	Timur Musin	12	Almetyevsk, Tatarstan	"Ave Maria"	—	—	—
Episode 1 (February 13, 2015)	7	Ekaterina Bizina	11	Penza	"History Repeating"	✔	✔	—
Episode 1 (February 13, 2015)	8	Alexander Savinov	11	Moscow	"Красный конь"	✔	—	—
Episode 1 (February 13, 2015)	9	Sofya Brovko	12	Krymsk, Krasnodar Krai	"Mercy"	✔	—	—
Episode 1 (February 13, 2015)	10	Veronika Tychkova	10	Novosibirsk	"Поля, Полюшка"	—	—	—
Episode 1 (February 13, 2015)	11	Yuliya Asessorova	11	Orenburg	"Who's Lovin' You"	✔	—	—
Episode 1 (February 13, 2015)	12	Johnry Zantaraya	13	Penza	"Hallelujah"	—	—	—
Episode 1 (February 13, 2015)	13	Ekaterina Prokudina	12	Nazarovo, Krasnoyarsk Krai	"It Don't Mean a Thing"	✔	—	—
Episode 2 (February 20, 2015)
Episode 2 (February 20, 2015)	1	Anastasiya Semyonova	10	Saint Petersburg	"Ленинградский рок-н-ролл"	—	—	✔
Episode 2 (February 20, 2015)	2	Matvey Semishkur	12	Saint Petersburg	"Shape of My Heart"	✔	✔	—
Episode 2 (February 20, 2015)	3	Elizaveta Shaluba	14	Novorossiysk, Krasnodar Krai	"Non, je ne regrette rien"	—	—	—
Episode 2 (February 20, 2015)	4	Katrina Paula Diringa	9	Riga, Latvia	"Снег"	✔	✔	—
Episode 2 (February 20, 2015)	5	Georgiy Dolgolenko	12	Moscow	"Chandelier"	—	✔	—
Episode 2 (February 20, 2015)	6	Sabina Mustaeva	14	Tashkent, Uzbekistan	"Путь"	✔	✔	✔
Episode 2 (February 20, 2015)	7	Marina Mishenko	11	Naberezhnye Chelny, Tatarstan	"Улыбайся"	—	—	—
Episode 2 (February 20, 2015)	8	Evdokiya Malevskaya	12	Saint Petersburg	"Summertime"	✔	—	—
Episode 2 (February 20, 2015)	9	Lev Suvorov	10	Lipetsk	"Я вернусь"	—	—	—
Episode 2 (February 20, 2015)	10	Varvara Kistyaeva	11	Ivanteyevka, Moscow Oblast	"Smile"	—	—	✔
Episode 2 (February 20, 2015)	11	Anastasia Zueva	14	Chelyabinsk	"Because of You"	—	—	—
Episode 2 (February 20, 2015)	12	Alina Mikhalchenko	14	Moscow	"Mamma Knows Best"	✔	—	—
Episode 2 (February 20, 2015)	13	Alexey Zabugin	11	Novy Urengoy, YaNAO	"С тобой"	✔	✔	—
Episode 3 (February 27, 2015)
Episode 3 (February 27, 2015)	1	Larisa Grigoryeva	12	Moscow	"Вдоль по Питерской"	—	—	—
Episode 3 (February 27, 2015)	2	Mariya Mirova	9	Meleuz, Bashkortostan	"The Winner Takes It All"	✔	✔	—
Episode 3 (February 27, 2015)	3	Daniil Furman	11	Samara	"Happy"	✔	—	✔
Episode 3 (February 27, 2015)	4	Mariya Stamova	14	Krasnodar	"Эхо любви"	✔	✔	—
Episode 3 (February 27, 2015)	5	Yaroslav Sokolikov	7	Minsk, Belarus	"Ben"	✔	✔	✔
Episode 3 (February 27, 2015)	6	Elizaveta Marochkina	11	Murmansk	"Je veux"	—	—	✔
Episode 3 (February 27, 2015)	7	Svetlana Bedyukh	12	Saint Petersburg	"Нарисую тебе звёзды"	—	—	—
Episode 3 (February 27, 2015)	8	Egor Grigoryev	11	Bor, Nizhny Novgorod Oblast	"Sweet People"	—	✔	—
Episode 3 (February 27, 2015)	9	Adelina Kyurdzhieva	12	Tyumen	"Любовь настала"	—	—	—
Episode 3 (February 27, 2015)	10	Yana Bon Su He	13	Novosibirsk	"Простая песня"	✔	—	—
Episode 3 (February 27, 2015)	11	Daniil Ilchenko	14	Omsk	"Home"	—	—	—
Episode 3 (February 27, 2015)	12	Sofiya Kvaratskheliya	12	Saint Petersburg	"Georgia on My Mind"	✔	—	—
Episode 3 (February 27, 2015)	13	Kseniya Kapustina	14	Moscow	"Listen"	✔	—	✔
Episode 4 (March 6, 2015)
Episode 4 (March 6, 2015)	1	Nazeli Vareldzhyan	7	Sochi, Krasnodar Krai	"А снег идёт"	—	—	✔
Episode 4 (March 6, 2015)	2	Arkadiy Evtushenko	9	Armavir, Krasnodar Krai	"Влюблённый солдат"	—	—	—
Episode 4 (March 6, 2015)	3	Nailya Umitbaeva	14	Ishimbay, Bashkortostan	"Non, je ne regrette rien"	—	✔	—
Episode 4 (March 6, 2015)	4	Eduard Rediko	11	Riga, Latvia	"Опера №2"	✔	✔	✔
Episode 4 (March 6, 2015)	5	Polina Romanova	13	Moscow	"Domino"	✔	—	—
Episode 4 (March 6, 2015)	6	Andrey Kluban (Note: Andrey Kluban did not pass the Blind auditions and fainted. By the decision of the organizers, he participated again in the next episode.)	14	Moscow	"Зурбаган"	—	—	—
Episode 4 (March 6, 2015)	7	Mariya Shumilova	10	Moscow	"It Don't Mean a Thing"	—	—	—
Episode 4 (March 6, 2015)	8	Dmitriy Ustinov	13	Odintsovo	"If I Ain't Got You"	—	✔	—
Episode 4 (March 6, 2015)	9	Khristina Chikhireva	14	Sochi, Krasnodar Krai	"Беги по небу"	—	—	✔
Episode 4 (March 6, 2015)	10	Karima Abdullina	12	Kazan	"Улыбайся"	—	—	—
Episode 4 (March 6, 2015)	11	Kamilla Kusova	12	Beslan, North Ossetia–Alania	"Nothing Else Matters"	—	✔	—
Episode 4 (March 6, 2015)	12	Alina Arakelova	13	Moscow	"Moon River"	✔	—	✔
Episode 4 (March 6, 2015)	13	Valeriya Kozhemyakina	12	Moscow	"Mamma Knows Best"	✔	—	—
Episode 5 (March 13, 2015)
Episode 5 (March 13, 2015)	1	Ekaterina Podobulina	14	Samara	"Хороший парень"	—	—	—
Episode 5 (March 13, 2015)	2	Mikhail Smirnov	11	Moscow	"Ben"	✔	✔	—
Episode 5 (March 13, 2015)	3	Renata Tazetdinova	15	Kazan	"Listen"	✔	✔	✔
Episode 5 (March 13, 2015)	4	Andrey Kluban	14	Moscow	"Зурбаган"	—	✔	—
Episode 5 (March 13, 2015)	5	Saida Mukhametzyanova	13	Kazan	"Су буйлап"	✔	✔	—
Episode 5 (March 13, 2015)	6	Sofya Feoktistova	9	Arzamas, Nizhny Novgorod Oblast	"Мойдодыр"	✔	✔	—
Episode 5 (March 13, 2015)	7	Valeriya Samokhvalova	14	Moscow	"Dernière danse"	Team full	—	✔
Episode 5 (March 13, 2015)	8	Timoti Sannikov	11	Bat Yam, Israel	"I Feel Good"	Team full	—	—
Episode 5 (March 13, 2015)	9	Maya Gitsina	12	Kursk	"If I Ain't Got You"	Team full	—	—
Episode 5 (March 13, 2015)	10	Polina Rudenko	12	Moscow	"Нарисую тебе звёзды"	Team full	—	✔
Episode 5 (March 13, 2015)	11	Emiliya Lidzhieva	11	Elista	"Non, je ne regrette rien"	Team full	—	—
Episode 5 (March 13, 2015)	12	Ranel Bogdanov	9	Kazan	"Ночной хулиган"	Team full	✔	—
Episode 5 (March 13, 2015)	13	Polina Ruzina	14	Moscow	"Dynamite"	Team full	Team full	—
Episode 5 (March 13, 2015)	14	Anastasiya Pershikova	9	Novosibirsk	"Highway to Hell"	Team full	Team full	✔

== The Battles ==
The Battles round started with the first half of episode 6 and ended with the first half of episode 8 (broadcast on March 20, 27, 2015; on April 3, 2015). Contestants who win their battle will advance to the Sing-off rounds.

Colour key

Artist won the Battle and advanced to the Sing-offs
Artist was eliminated

Episode	Coach	Order	Winner	Song	Losers	
Episode 6 (March 20, 2015)	Dima Bilan	1	Daniil Furman	"Rock Around the Clock"	Sofya Brovko	Alina Mikhalchenko
Episode 6 (March 20, 2015)	Dima Bilan	2	Mariya Mirova	"Titanium"	Yuliya Asessorova	Egor Pyatnitsyn
Episode 6 (March 20, 2015)	Dima Bilan	3	Evdokiya Malevskaya	"Леди Совершенство"	Valeriya Kozhemyakina	Ekaterina Prokudina
Episode 6 (March 20, 2015)	Dima Bilan	4	Sofiya Kvaratskheliya	"She Has No Time"	Yana Su Hen Bon	Alexander Savinov
Episode 6 (March 20, 2015)	Dima Bilan	5	Alexey Zabugin	"Прекрасное далёко"	Polina Romanova	Sofya Feoktistova
Episode 7 (March 27, 2015)	Pelageya	1	Mikhail Smirnov	"Souvenirs"	Dmitriy Ustinov	Georgiy Dolgolenko
Episode 7 (March 27, 2015)	Pelageya	2	Ekaterina Bizina	"Ах, этот вечер, лукавый маг"	Mariya Stamova	Darya Shavrina
Episode 7 (March 27, 2015)	Pelageya	3	Katrina Paula Diringa	"The Lion Sleeps Tonight"	Nailya Umitbaeva	Ranel Bogdanov
Episode 7 (March 27, 2015)	Pelageya	4	Saida Mukhametzyanova	"Аллилуйя"	Renata Tazetdinova	Kamilla Kusova
Episode 7 (March 27, 2015)	Pelageya	5	Matvey Semishkur	"Не повторяется такое никогда"	Andrey Kluban	Egor Grigoryev
Episode 8 (April 3, 2015)	Maxim Fadeev	1	Eduard Rediko	"Hideaway"	Valeriya Samokhvalova	Kseniya Kapustina
Episode 8 (April 3, 2015)	Maxim Fadeev	2	Alina Arakelova	"Broken Vow"	Khristina Chikhireva	Kseniya Brakunova
Episode 8 (April 3, 2015)	Maxim Fadeev	3	Elizaveta Marochkina	"Roar"	Anastasiya Semyonova	Anastasiya Pershikova
Episode 8 (April 3, 2015)	Maxim Fadeev	4	Sabina Mustaeva	"Dreamer"	Varvara Kistyaeva	Polina Rudenko
Episode 8 (April 3, 2015)	Maxim Fadeev	5	Yaroslav Sokolikov	"Белые розы"	Anzhela Doronina	Nazeli Vareldzhyan

== The Sing-offs ==
The Sing-offs round started with the second half of episode 6 and ended with the second half of episode 8 (broadcast on March 20, 27, 2015; on April 3, 2015). Contestants who was saved by their coaches will advance to the Final.

Colour key

Artist was saved by his/her coach and advanced to the Final
Artist was eliminated but received the Comeback and advanced to the Live Extra round

Episode	Coach	Order	Artist	Song	Result
Episode 6 (March 20, 2015)	Dima Bilan	1	Daniil Furman	"Happy"	Advanced to the Live Extra round
Episode 6 (March 20, 2015)	Dima Bilan	2	Mariya Mirova	"The Winner Takes It All"	Advanced to the Live Extra round
Episode 6 (March 20, 2015)	Dima Bilan	3	Evdokiya Malevskaya	"Summertime"	Advanced to the Live Extra round
Episode 6 (March 20, 2015)	Dima Bilan	4	Sofiya Kvaratskheliya	"Georgia on My Mind"	Advanced to the Final
Episode 6 (March 20, 2015)	Dima Bilan	5	Alexey Zabugin	"С тобой"	Advanced to the Final
Episode 7 (March 27, 2015)	Pelageya	1	Mikhail Smirnov	"Ben"	Advanced to the Final
Episode 7 (March 27, 2015)	Pelageya	2	Ekaterina Bizina	"History Repeating"	Advanced to the Live Extra round
Episode 7 (March 27, 2015)	Pelageya	3	Katrina Paula Diringa	"Снег"	Advanced to the Live Extra round
Episode 7 (March 27, 2015)	Pelageya	4	Saida Mukhametzyanova	"Су буйлап"	Advanced to the Live Extra round
Episode 7 (March 27, 2015)	Pelageya	5	Matvey Semishkur	"Shape of My Heart"	Advanced to the Final
Episode 8 (April 3, 2015)	Maxim Fadeev	1	Eduard Rediko	"Опера №2"	Advanced to the Final
Episode 8 (April 3, 2015)	Maxim Fadeev	2	Alina Arakelova	"Moon River"	Advanced to the Live Extra round
Episode 8 (April 3, 2015)	Maxim Fadeev	3	Elizaveta Marochkina	"Je veux"	Advanced to the Live Extra round
Episode 8 (April 3, 2015)	Maxim Fadeev	4	Sabina Mustaeva	"Путь"	Advanced to the Live Extra round
Episode 8 (April 3, 2015)	Maxim Fadeev	5	Yaroslav Sokolikov	"Ben"	Advanced to the Final

== Live shows ==
=== Week 1: Live Extra round ===
Each coach brought back three artists who were eliminated in the Sing-offs. Nine artists sang live and six was eliminated by the end of the night. Three saved artists advanced to the Final.

Color key:

Artist was saved by the Public's votes and advanced to the Final
Artist was eliminated

Episode	Coach	Order	Artist	Song	Public's vote	Result
Episode 9 (April 10, 2015)	Dima Bilan	1	Mariya Mirova	"Sweet People"	27.6%	Eliminated
Episode 9 (April 10, 2015)	Dima Bilan	2	Daniil Furman	"Что ты имела ввиду"	24%	Eliminated
Episode 9 (April 10, 2015)	Dima Bilan	3	Evdokiya Malevskaya	"Память"	48.4%	Advanced to the Final
Episode 9 (April 10, 2015)	Pelageya	4	Saida Mukhametzyanova	"В горнице"	56%	Advanced to the Final
Episode 9 (April 10, 2015)	Pelageya	5	Ekaterina Bizina	"Садочек"	21.4%	Eliminated
Episode 9 (April 10, 2015)	Pelageya	6	Katrina Paula Diringa	"Vilku dziesma"	22.6%	Eliminated
Episode 9 (April 10, 2015)	Maxim Fadeev	7	Elizaveta Marochkina	"Strong Enough"	12.6%	Eliminated
Episode 9 (April 10, 2015)	Maxim Fadeev	8	Alina Arakelova	"Я искала тебя"	21.4%	Eliminated
Episode 9 (April 10, 2015)	Maxim Fadeev	9	Sabina Mustaeva	"Somebody to Love"	66%	Advanced to the Final

Non-competition performances
Order	Performer	Song
9.1	Lev Akselrod	"Я буду помнить"
9.2	Ragda Khanieva	"Расскажите, птицы"
9.3	Alisa Kozhikina	"The Best"

=== Week 2: Final ===
Color key:

Artist was saved by the Public's votes and advanced to the Super Final
Artist was eliminated

Episode	Coach	Order	Artist	Song	Public's vote	Result
Episode 10 (April 17, 2015)
Episode 10 (April 17, 2015)	Final					
Episode 10 (April 17, 2015)	Maxim Fadeev	1	Yaroslav Sokolikov	"Дорогие мои старики"	30.7%	Eliminated
Episode 10 (April 17, 2015)	Maxim Fadeev	2	Eduard Rediko	"Lo ti penso amore"	13.5%	Eliminated
Episode 10 (April 17, 2015)	Maxim Fadeev	3	Sabina Mustaeva	"Run to You"	55.8%	Advanced
Episode 10 (April 17, 2015)	Pelageya	4	Matvey Semishkur	"Чёрный ворон"	37.1%	Eliminated
Episode 10 (April 17, 2015)	Pelageya	5	Mikhail Smirnov	"S.O.S. d'un terrien en detresse"	22%	Eliminated
Episode 10 (April 17, 2015)	Pelageya	6	Saida Mukhametzyanova	"Колыбельная"	40.9%	Advanced
Episode 10 (April 17, 2015)	Dima Bilan	7	Evdokiya Malevskaya	"Старый рояль"	36.8%	Advanced
Episode 10 (April 17, 2015)	Dima Bilan	8	Sofiya Kvaratskheliya	"Мама"	29.2%	Eliminated
Episode 10 (April 17, 2015)	Dima Bilan	9	Alexey Zabugin	"The Greatest Love of All"	34%	Eliminated
Episode 10 (April 17, 2015)	Super Final					
Episode 10 (April 17, 2015)	Maxim Fadeev	1	Sabina Mustaeva	"Crazy"	45%	Winner
Episode 10 (April 17, 2015)	Pelageya	2	Saida Mukhametzyanova	"Non, je ne regrette rien"	27%	Third place
Episode 10 (April 17, 2015)	Dima Bilan	3	Evdokiya Malevskaya	"Total Eclipse of the Heart"	28%	Runner-up

Non-competition performances
Order	Performer	Song
10.1	Maxim Fadeev, Yaroslav Sokolikov, Eduard Rediko, and Sabina Mustaeva	"Superstition"
10.2	Pelageya, Matvey Semishkur, Mikhail Smirnov, and Saida Mukhametzyanova	"Тёмная ночь"
10.3	Dima Bilan, Evdokiya Malevskaya, Sofiya Kvaratskheliya, and Alexey Zabugin	"Обними меня"
10.4	Sabina Mustaeva (winner)	"Путь"
10.5	All artists of the 2nd season	"Сделай мне навстречу шаг"

== Reception ==
=== Ratings ===
Episode		Original airdate	Production	Time slot (UTC)	Audience		Source
Episode		Original airdate	Production	Time slot (UTC)	Rating	Share	Source
1	"The Blind Auditions Premiere"	February 13, 2015	201	Friday 6:30 p.m.	8.7	26.2	
2	"The Blind Auditions, Part 2"	February 20, 2015	202	Friday 6:30 p.m.	8.0	25.5	
3	"The Blind Auditions, Part 3"	February 27, 2015	203	Friday 6:30 p.m.	8.0	24.1	
4	"The Blind Auditions, Part 4"	March 6, 2015	204	Friday 6:30 p.m.	7.9	25.5	
5	"The Blind Auditions, Part 5"	March 13, 2015	205	Friday 6:30 p.m.	8.2	25.6	
6	"The Battles and the Sing-offs Premiere"	March 20, 2015	206	Friday 6:30 p.m.	7.4	24.1	
7	"The Battles and the Sing-offs, Part 2"	March 27, 2015	207	Friday 6:30 p.m.	7.6	22.9	
8	"The Battles and the Sing-offs, Part 3"	April 3, 2015	208	Friday 6:30 p.m.	7.4	23.5	
9	"Live Playoffs"	April 10, 2015	209	Friday 6:30 p.m.	6.0	18.8	
10	"Live Season Final"	April 17, 2015	210	Friday 6:30 p.m.	6.8	23.4	
