= I'm Lying on the Beach =

Single by Alisa Kozhikina

from the album I Am Not a Toy
- Released: 6 July 2015
- Genre: Pop
- Length: 2:54
- Label: Mikhail Chertishchev Records
- Songwriters: Vadim Vatagin (lyrics); Mikhail Chertishchev (music)
- Producer: Mikhail Chertishchev

Alisa Kozhikina singles chronology
| "Little Red Riding Hood" (2015) | "I'm Lying on the Beach" (2015) | "Padala" (2015) |

Music video
- "I'm Lying on the Beach" on YouTube

Professional ratings
Review scores
| Source | Rating |
|---|---|
| InterMedia | 3/5 stars |

"I'm Lying on the Beach" (Russian: Я лежу на пляже, Ya lezhu na plyazhe) is a song by Russian child singer Alisa Kozhikina. She released it as a digital single in 2015, at the age of 12.

== Critical reception ==
InterMedia writer Alexey Mazhayev praises the song for its universality with regard to performer's age. He also notes that "Alisa manages to perform this seemingly children's fun summer song as if she already imagines how she will sing it in 15 years or so. This not to say that Alisa Kozhikina in any way mimics adult singers, she remains herself."

== Charts ==
| Chart (2015) | Peak position |
|---|---|
| CIS (Top Hit Weekly General) | 216 |
| CIS (Top Hit Weekly Audience Choice) | 238 |
| Russia (Top Hit Weekly Russia) | 1077 |
