= Giamaica =

"Jamaica / Pappagallo"

Single by Robertino
- A-side: "Jamaica" "Pappagallo"
- Written: T. A. Valli
- Released: 1961
- Label: Triola

"Giamaica" (also known as "Jamaica") is a song written by T. A. Valli. In late 1950s and 1960s it was recorded by a number of Italian artists: Luciano Virgili, Giorgio Consolini, 13-year-old Robertino Loretti.

== Composition ==
Robertino Loretti characterizes the song as "bright and fresh".

The lyrics go like this:

Jamaica! Jamaica! When it seemed like I was burning under your magnificent scorching sun, I could quench my thirst from a spring. But how can I rinse the heat of my heart that burns of passion?

== Popularity in the Soviet Union ==
In the USSR Robertino Loretti's version of the song became immensely popular when around 1962 his record containing it was released in the country. Together with his rendition of "Santa Lucia", "Giamaica" could be heard from every window. The song was since translated into Russian.

== Other covers ==
In 1961 the song was covered by Danish singer Birthe Wilke. Her version was released as a single, with "Pepito" on the other side.

== Track listings ==
=== Luciano Virgili "Giamaica" (single) ===
7-inch (45 RPM) single La Voce Del Padrone 7MQ 1498 (1958, Italy)

A. "Giamaica"

(T. A. Valli)

B. "Ti desidero"

(Guarino, Pluto)

=== Giorgio Consolini "Giamaica" (single) ===
7-inch (45 RPM) single Parlophon QMSP 16269 (1959, Italy)

A. "Giamaica"

(Valli)

AA. "Rimpiangimi"

(Testoni, Piubeni)

=== Robertino "Jamaica / Pappagallo" (single) ===
7-inch (45 RPM) single (1959, Denmark, Germany, Netherlands, etc.)

A. "Jamaica"

Robertino with the Otto Franckers Orchestra

AA. "Pappagallo"

Robertino with the Otto Franckers Orchestra

=== Robertino "Jamaica" (EP) ===
7-inch EP (45 RPM) Triola TEP 31 (1961, Sweden, Switzerland, etc.)

A1. "Jamaica"
A2. "Pappagallo"
B1. "'Anema e core"
B2. "Papaveri e papere"

=== Birthe Wilke "Pepito / Jamaica" (single) ===
7-inch (45 RPM) single Philips 355 247 PF (1961, Denmark)

A. "Pepito"
B. "Jamaica"
