= Alisa Kozhikina =

Russian singer (born 2003)

Alisa Kozhikina Алиса Кожикина
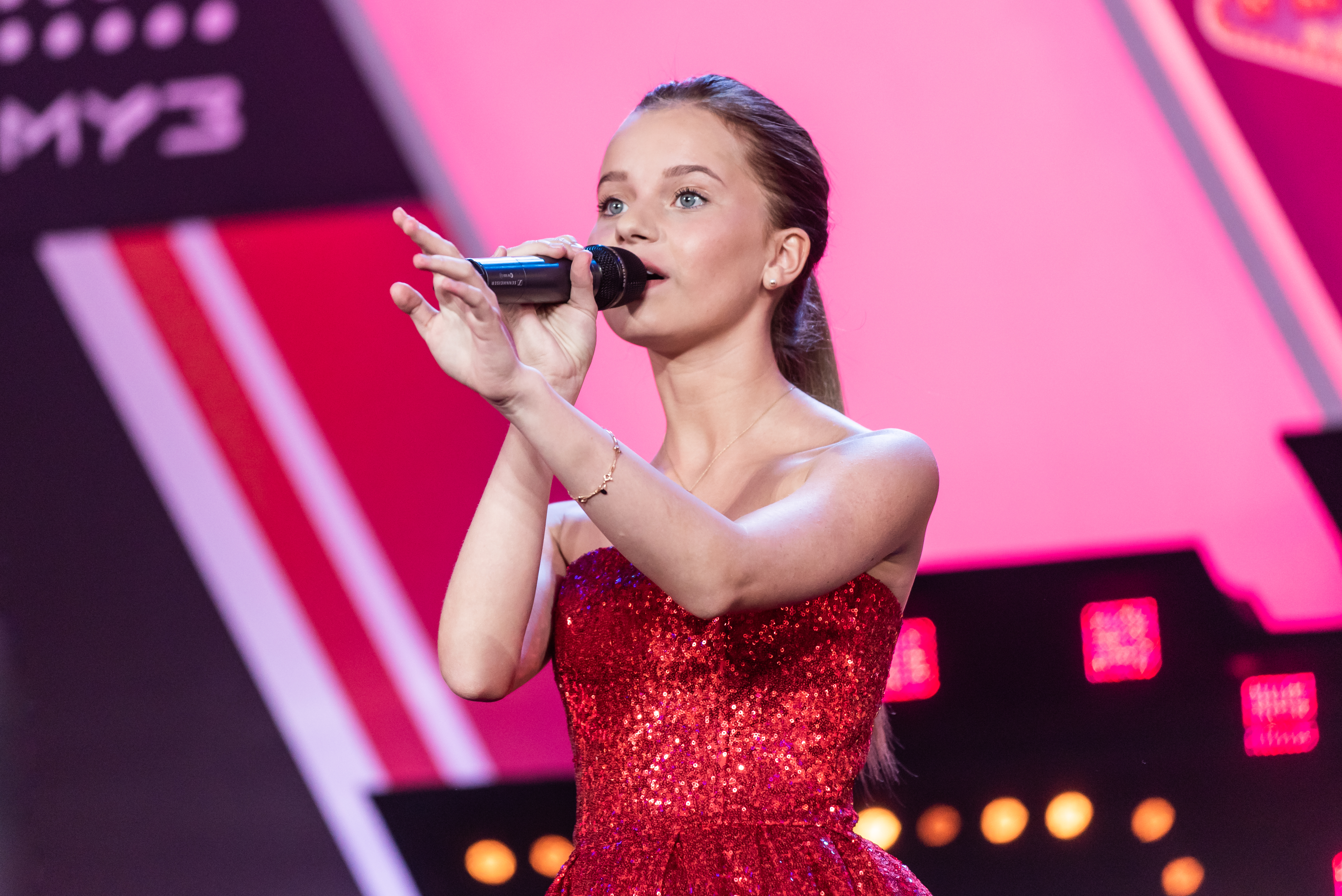

Background information
- Born: Alisa Alekseyevna Kozhikina; 22 June 2003 (age 23); Uspenka, Kursk Oblast, Russia
- Genres: Pop
- Occupation: Singer
- Instruments: Vocals, piano
- Years active: 2010–present
- Labels: Universal Music Group, Mikhail Chertishchev Records
- Website: alisa-kozhikina.ru

Alisa Alekseyevna Kozhikina (Russian: Алиса Алексеевна Кожикина, born 22 June 2003) is a Russian singer. In 2014, she became the first person to win The Voice Kids Russia. Later that year she represented Russia at the Junior Eurovision Song Contest 2014 in Malta with her song "Dreamer."

== Early life ==
Alisa Kozhikina was born on 22 June 2003 in Uspenka, a rural village in Kursk Oblast. Alisa herself is no stranger to singing contests, thus having received a variety of awards. She has taken part in various contests, including the 2010 Rose of the Winds, the 2011 Constellation of Youth, and the 2012 New Wave Junior.

== Musical career ==
=== 2014: The Voice Kids Russia and 2014 Junior Eurovision Song Contest ===
In April 2014, Kozhikina won the grand final of TV singing contest The Voice Kids Russia on the Russian Channel One. In the superfinal (the last stage of the contest) she sang a Russian version of Mariah Carey's hit "My All" (with newly-written Russian lyrics by Maxim Fadeev, her coach on the show). The prize was 500 thousand roubles and a recording contract with Universal Music.

On 22 September 2014 it became known that Alisa Kozhikina was selected to represent Russia at the 12th annual Junior Eurovision Song Contest in Malta, with her song "Dreamer". The song was composed by Maxim Fadeev, the lyrics were written by Kozhikina herself along with Serebro's Olga Seryabkina. Alisa was the thirteenth to perform at the finals. She landed at the fifth place in the contest with 96 points.

Also in 2014 Alisa performed as a special guest at the Russian MuzTV Awards (in June) and voiced all the vocal parts of the main heroine for the Russian-language version of the 2014 U.S. musical film Annie, which was released in Russian cinemas on 19 March 2015.

=== 2015–2016: Recording debut ===
In April 2015 Alisa Kozhikina released her debut single, which was a cover of the song "Get Lucky" by Daft Punk. The singles "Little Red Riding Hood" and "I'm Lying on the Beach" followed by the end of August.

In the autumn of 2015 Alisa's song "Stala Silnee" ("I Became Stronger") received airplay on dozens of radio stations in Russia and Russian-language radio stations across the world. It peaked at 53rd position in the Top Hit Weekly General chart and at 74th position in the Top Hit Weekly Russia chart.

In 2016 she lent her singing voice to the soundtrack of the Russian version of the children's animated series Princess Sissi which had been shown on the Russian TV channel Gulli since December 2015.

Before that, in 2015, Alisa together with Semyon Treskunov recorded the main theme song for the Russian animation feature film The Fortress. With the Shield and the Sword. (The song plays during the ending credits.) She also played the title role of Alice (in Russian, the name is "Alisa") in the illusionists Safronov Brothers' New Year's show Alice in Wonderland. During the New Year holidays it was attended by over 12,000 people.

On 13 May 2016 in Belgorod Alisa Kozhikina gave her first ever solo concert.

On 1 November 2016 Alisa Kozhikina released her first ever album, titled I Am Not a Toy (Russian: Я не игрушка). The music video for the title track, which was uploaded to YouTube on 31 October, gathered its first 1 million views there in less than 48 hours.

== Discography ==
"Get Lucky"
Review scores
| Source | Rating |
|---|---|
| InterMedia | 3/5 stars |

"Little Red Riding Hood"
Review scores
| Source | Rating |
|---|---|
| InterMedia | 4/5 stars |

"I'm Lying on the Beach"
Review scores
| Source | Rating |
|---|---|
| InterMedia | 3/5 stars |

=== Albums ===
| Title | Album details |
|---|---|
| I Am Not a Toy (Russian: Я не игрушка) | Released: 1 November 2016; Label: Mikhail Chertishchev Records |
| You Are with Me (Russian: Ты со мной) | Released: 1 October 2018; Label: Alisa Kozhikina |

=== Singles and selected songs ===
| Title | Year | Charts | | Notes | Album |
| Title | Year | CIS^{*} | RU | Notes | Album |
| Title | Year | Top Hit Weekly General | Top Hit Weekly Russia | Notes | Album |
|---|---|---|---|---|---|
| "Dreamer"^{[A]} | 2014 | 313 | 1765 | | |
| "Get Lucky" (Live)^{[B]} | 2015 | — | — | Digital single | |
| "Little Red Riding Hood" ("Шапочка") | 2015 | — | — | Digital single | I Am Not a Toy |
| "I'm Lying on the Beach" ("Я лежу на пляже") | 2015 | 216 | 1077 | Digital single | I Am Not a Toy |
| "I Was Falling" ("Падала") | 2015 | — | — | Digital single | I Am Not a Toy |
| "I Became Stronger" ("Стала сильнее") | 2015 | 53 | 74 | Digital single | I Am Not a Toy |
| "Your Road" ("Твоя дорога")^{[C]} (with Semyon Treskunov) | 2015 | — | — | Digital single | |
| "Black Smoke" ("Чёрный дым")^{[C]} | 2015 | — | — | Digital single | |
| "White Snowflakes" ("Белые снежинки") | 2015 | 345 | 1524 | Digital single | I Am Not a Toy |
| "Princess Sissi"^{[D]} | 2016 | — | — | | |
| "I Am Not a Toy" ("Я не игрушка") | 2016 | 368 | 1605 | | I Am Not a Toy |
| "In Wonderland" ("В стране чудес") | 2017 | — | — | Digital single | |
| "Back Off" ("Сдай назад") | 2017 | — | — | Digital single | |
| "According to the Pick-up Rules" ("По правилам пикапа") | 2017 | — | — | Digital single | |

^{*} The Top Hit Weekly General chart's rankings are based on airplay on 230 radio stations in Russia, as well as 200 Russian-language radio stations all over the world (in Ukraine, the CIS countries, the Baltic states, Cyprus, Israel, Germany, the United States, and Canada).
^{[A]} Russia's Junior Eurovision Song Contest 2014 entry
^{[B]} Alisa Kozhikina's debut single
^{[C]} From the soundtrack for the Russian animated feature film The Fortress: By Shield and Sword
^{[D]} The Russian-language title song for the French animated television series Princess Sissi

Awards and achievements
| Preceded by Dayana Kirillova with "Dream On" | Russia in the Junior Eurovision Song Contest; 2014 | Succeeded by Misha Smirnov with "Mechta" |
