= Dreamer (Alisa Kozhikina song) =

Single by Alisa Kozhikina

Single by Alisa Kozhikina
- Released: 28 September 2014
- Recorded: Summer 2014
- Genre: Pop
- Length: 3:00
- Songwriters: Maxim Fadeev, Alisa Kozhikina, Olga Seryabkina

Music video
- "Dreamer" on YouTube

Junior Eurovision Song Contest 2014 entry
- Country: Russia
- Artist: Alisa Kozhikina
- Languages: Russian, English
- Composers: Alisa Kozhikina, Maxim Fadeev
- Lyricists: Alisa Kozhikina, Olga Seryabkina

Finals performance
- Final result: 5th
- Final points: 96

Entry chronology
- ◄ "Mechtay" (2013)
- "Mechta (Dream)" (2015) ►

"Dreamer" (Russian: Белые ангелы, romanized: Belyye angely) is a song by Russian child singer Alisa Kozhikina, who won the first season of The Voice Kids of Russia. It represented Russia at the Junior Eurovision Song Contest 2014 in Marsa, Malta, placing 5th with 96 points. The song is a ballad where Alisa sings about being free like a bird and she dreams away during the music video.

== Music video ==
Two music videos exist for the song.

=== Junior Eurovision version ===
This video is filmed in black-and-white and features Kozhikina singing at a park near the Moscow State University. At the second chorus, a woman roller skating by gives her balloons, which she eventually released into the sky. At the climax, she then lays down on the grass, and when she gets up, a string quartet appears in the background. This version is the official version that was released in the Junior Eurovision Song Contest YouTube channel on 28 September 2014.

=== Lyric version ===
This video aired on Russia's Karusel TV and was also uploaded to Kozhikina's official page on Facebook on 8 November 2014 and this version features her singing against a black background which later turns into a backdrop with stars. She then ascends a small flight of stairs during the second stanza of the song, and towards the last chorus, the background changes to a blue sky with clouds. The video then ends with the background fading back to black. This version also comes with karaoke-style lyrics displayed at the bottom of the screen.

== Performances ==
=== Junior Eurovision 2014 ===
Alisa performed "Dreamer" at JESC 2014 in Marsa, Malta on 15 November 2014. Russia performed 13th, after Armenia and before Serbia. At the close of the voting, Dreamer placed 5th with 96 points.

== Charts ==
Chart (2014)	Peak position
CIS (Top Hit Weekly General)	313
CIS (Top Hit Weekly Audience Choice)	188
Russia (Top Hit Weekly Russia)	1765
