= The Voice Kids (Russian TV series) season 6 =

Season of television series

The Voice Kids
- Season 6
- Presented by: Dmitry Nagiev; Aglaya Shilovskaya
- Coaches: Pelageya; Valery Meladze; LOBODA
- Winner: The Top 9 artists

Release
- Original network: Channel One
- Original release: February 15 – May 24, 2019

Season chronology
- ← Previous; Season 5 Next → Season 7

The sixth season of the Russian reality talent show The Voice Kids premiered on February 15, 2019 on Channel One. Dmitry Nagiev returned as the show's presenter. Aglaya Shilovskaya replaced Agata Muceniece as a co-presenter. Pelageya and Valery Meladze returned as coach, Svetlana Loboda (LOBODA) replaced Basta.

The end result of the final on April 26 was so decisive, that fans started questioning the results. Channel One TV tasked the cyber-security firm Group-IB to look for manipulations in the votes. A preliminary result confirmed vote manipulation. Channel One TV annulled the results of the final on May 16 and announced a new final show for May 24.

For the first time, the audience chose the Best Coach of the season. Pelageya won with a result of 56%.

== Coaches and presenters ==
The Voice Kids season 6 coaches

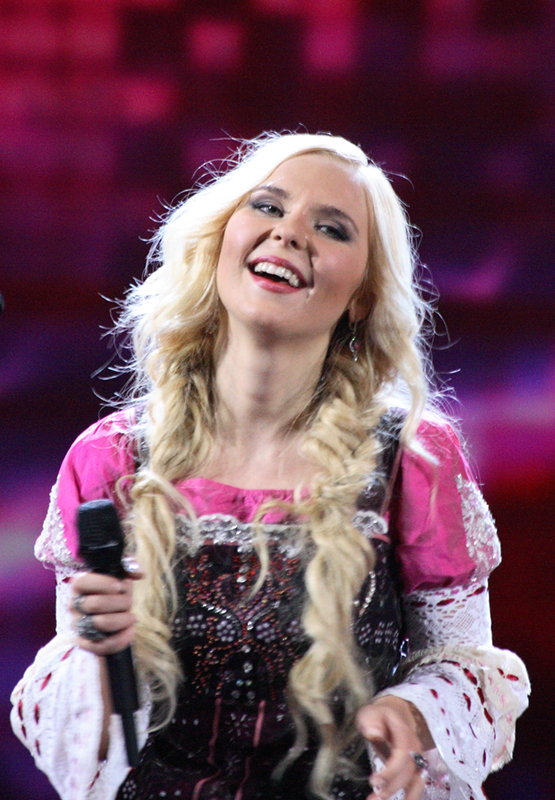
Pelageya

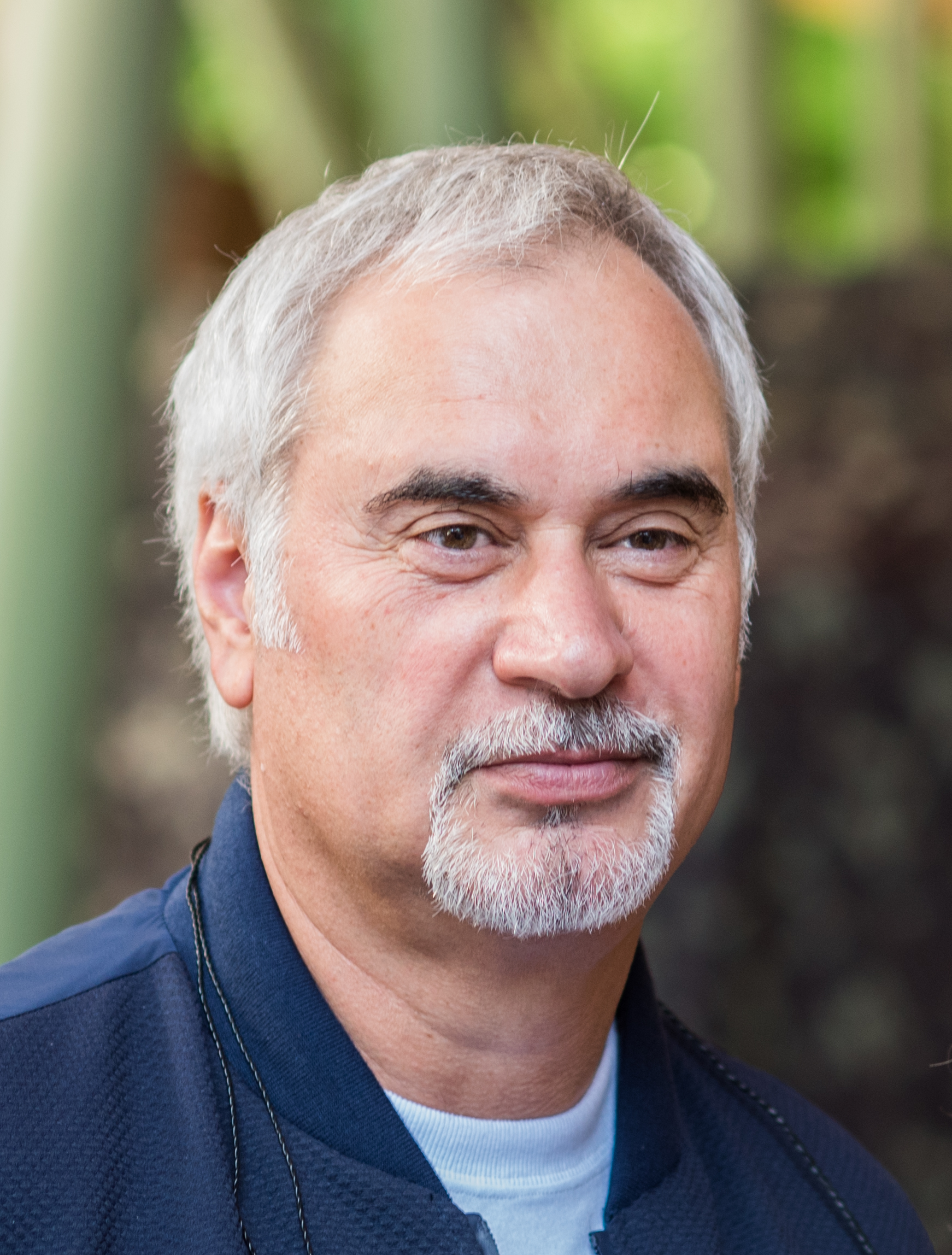
Valery Meladze

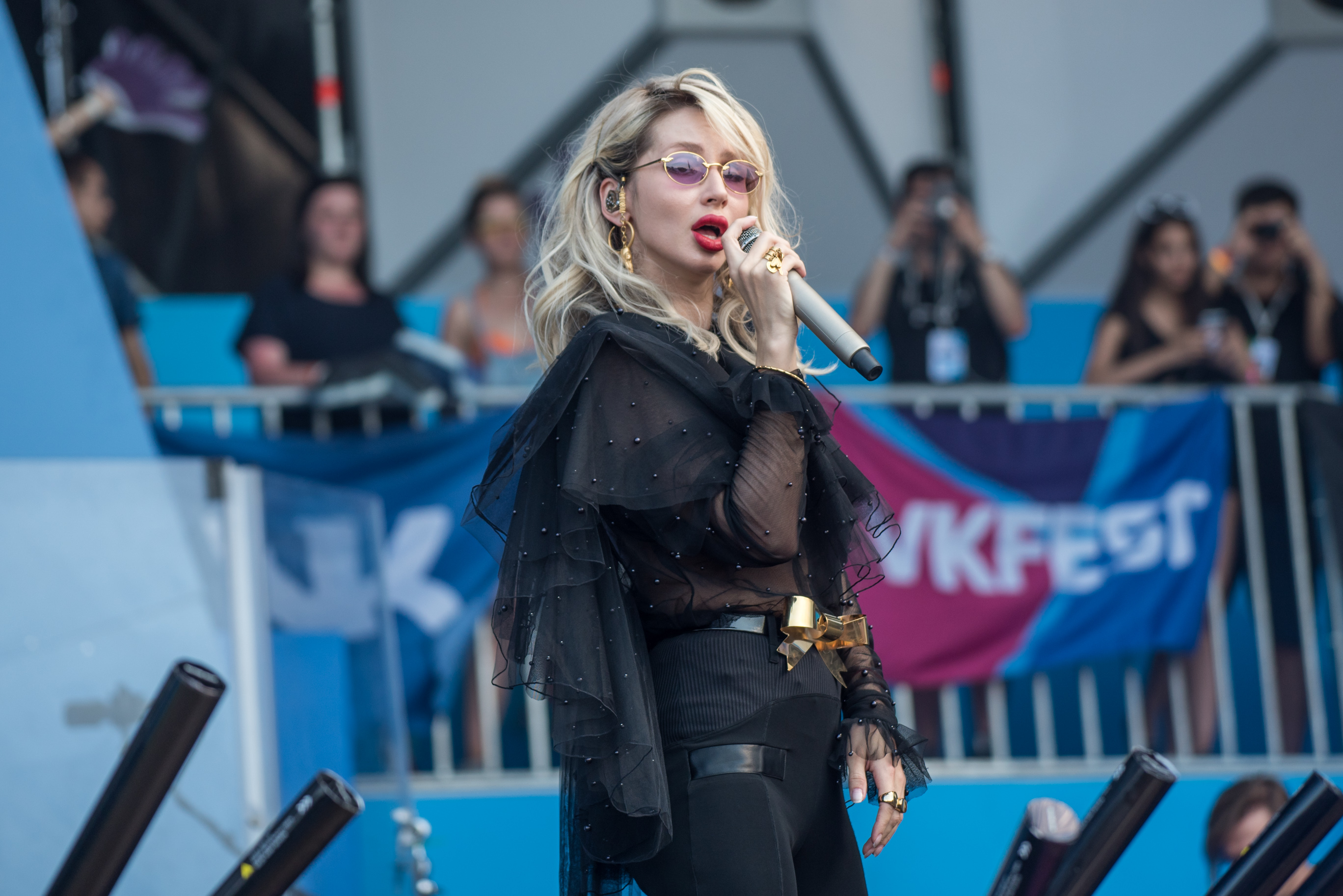
LOBODA

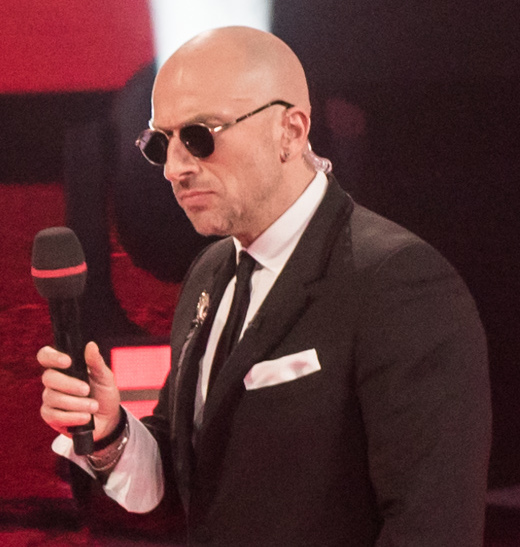
Dmitry Nagiev

Aglaya Shilovskaya

Pelageya and Valery Meladze are joined by LOBODA, who replaced Basta, thus making it the first season to have two female coaches. Dmitry Nagiev is joined by Aglaya Shilovskaya, who replaced Agata Muceniece.

== Teams ==
Colour key

- Winner
- Eliminated in the Live Extra round
- Eliminated in the Battle rounds

| Coaches | Top 45 artists | | | | |
|---|---|---|---|---|---|
| Pelageya | | | | | |
| Pelageya | Valeriy Kuzakov | Renata Tairova | Mariam Abdelkader | Anastasiya Roginskaya | Alika Karpenko |
| Pelageya | Dmitriy Yadykin | Artyom Kukin | Anna Glotova | Sofiya Tikhomirova | Darya Filimonova |
| Pelageya | Evgeniya Divenko | Anna Avazneli | Alexandra Kharazyan | Artyom Braylov | Dobrynya Kirienko |
| Valery Meladze | | | | | |
| Valery Meladze | Erzhan Maxim | Mikhail Grigoryan | Anastasiya Sisauri | Mitya Pukhovskiy | Mariia Fedulova |
| Valery Meladze | Islam Balkoev | Zhan Makim | Elizaveta Shamieva | Yana Khvan | Viktoriya Nikolaeva |
| Valery Meladze | Ivan Starikov | Andrey Kalashov | Elizaveta Khupeniya | Lev Mullo | Yana Ten |
| LOBODA | | | | | |
| LOBODA | Mikella Abramova | Nino Chesner | Robert Bagratyan | Ekaterina Gavrilyuk | Anastasiya Ivanova |
| LOBODA | Mariya Tyuryutikova | Elen Badalyan | Ivan Sokhnev | Arina Pekhtereva | Arina & Sofya Beryoziny |
| LOBODA | Mariam Dzhalagoniya | Sofya Filippova | Sergey Filin | Egor Chichin | Yuliya Karlina |
Note: Italicized names are stolen contestants (who were eliminated in the Sing-offs, but were stolen in the Live Extra round and advanced to the Final).

== Blind auditions ==
A new feature this season is The Best coach of the season (also in each episode).

Colour key

| ✔ | Coach pressed his/her "I WANT YOU" button |
| | Artist defaulted to this coach's team |
| | Artist elected to join this coach's team |
| | Artist eliminated with no coach pressing his or her "I WANT YOU" button |

The coaches performed "Venus" at the start of the show.

| Episode | Order | Artist | Age | Hometown | Song | Coach's and artist's choices | | |
| Episode | Order | Artist | Age | Hometown | Song | Pelageya | Meladze | LOBODA |
|---|---|---|---|---|---|---|---|---|
| Episode 1 (Note: Pelageya is The best coach of episode 1.) (February 15) | 1 | Ekaterina Gavrilyuk | 9 | Vladivostok | "До свиданья, мама!" | ✔ | — | ✔ |
| Episode 1 (February 15) | 2 | Elizaveta Shamieva | 14 | Sochi, Krasnodar Krai | "Careless Whisper" | — | ✔ | ✔ |
| Episode 1 (February 15) | 3 | Lev Mullo | 7 | Saint Petersburg | "Первым делом — самолёты" | ✔ | ✔ | ✔ |
| Episode 1 (February 15) | 4 | Kristian Azarov | 13 | Moscow | "Осколки лета" | — | — | — |
| Episode 1 (February 15) | 5 | Nino Chesner | 8 | Moscow | "Hymne à l'amour" | ✔ | ✔ | ✔ |
| Episode 1 (February 15) | 6 | Ivan Kirichenko | 9 | Sochi, Krasnodar Krai | "Герои спорта" | — | — | — |
| Episode 1 (February 15) | 7 | Evgeniya Divenko | 10 | Odintsovo, Moscow Oblast | "Contigo en la Distancia" | ✔ | — | — |
| Episode 1 (February 15) | 8 | Veronika Litovchenko | 10 | Moscow | "Aïcha" | — | — | — |
| Episode 1 (February 15) | 9 | Ivan Starikov | 12 | Chernushka, Perm Krai | "Океанами стали" | — | ✔ | — |
| Episode 1 (February 15) | 10 | Artyom Kukin | 13 | Krasnoyarsk | "New York State of Mind" | ✔ | — | — |
| Episode 1 (February 15) | 11 | Arina Pekhtereva | 10 | Mogilev, Belarus | "It Don't Mean a Thing" | — | — | ✔ |
| Episode 2 (Note: Pelageya is The best coach of episode 2.) (February 22) | 1 | Mitya Pukhovskiy | 7 | Mogilev, Belarus | "Вдоль по Питерской" | ✔ | ✔ | — |
| Episode 2 (February 22) | 2 | Ekaterina Budey | 14 | Edineț, Moldova | "Lost on You" | — | — | — |
| Episode 2 (February 22) | 3 | Anastasiya Bolshakova | 4 | Moscow | "Волшебник-недоучка" | — | — | — |
| Episode 2 (February 22) | 4 | Islam Balkoev | 13 | Tyumen | "Hallelujah I Love Her So" | — | ✔ | — |
| Episode 2 (February 22) | 5 | Anastasiya Roginskaya | 6 | Aprelevka, Moscow Oblast | "Старый рояль" | ✔ | ✔ | ✔ |
| Episode 2 (February 22) | 6 | Khasan Rakhimov | 14 | Riga, Latvia | "Mamma" | — | — | — |
| Episode 2 (February 22) | 7 | Mariya Tyuryutikova | 12 | Ryazan | "Плакала" | — | — | ✔ |
| Episode 2 (February 22) | 8 | Sergey Filin | 10 | Moscow | "Great Balls of Fire" | — | — | ✔ |
| Episode 2 (February 22) | 9 | Renata Tairova | 12 | Astrakhan | "Canção do mar" | ✔ | ✔ | — |
| Episode 2 (February 22) | 10 | Egor Meshcheryakov | 13 | Voronezh | "Орлы или вороны" | — | — | — |
| Episode 2 (February 22) | 11 | Elen Badalyan | 11 | Moscow | "Don't You Worry 'bout a Thing" | — | ✔ | ✔ |
| Episode 3 (Note: Pelageya is The best coach of episode 3.) (March 1) | 1 | Anna Glotova | 12 | Ekaterinburg | "Let It Be" | ✔ | ✔ | — |
| Episode 3 (March 1) | 2 | Ivan Sokhnev | 8 | Ramenskoye, Moscow Oblast | "Солдат" | — | — | ✔ |
| Episode 3 (March 1) | 3 | Yana Ten | 10 | Novosibirsk | "Symphony" | — | ✔ | — |
| Episode 3 (March 1) | 4 | Timur Aliev | 7 | Almetyevsk, Tatarstan | "Му-му" | — | — | — |
| Episode 3 (March 1) | 5 | Arina & Sofya Beryoziny | 12 | Krasnoyarsk | "Tell Him" | ✔ | — | ✔ |
| Episode 3 (March 1) | 6 | Viktoriya Nikolaeva | 9 | Ob, Novosibirsk oblast | "Перемирие" | — | ✔ | — |
| Episode 3 (March 1) | 7 | Erzhan Maxim | 11 | Oral, Kazakhstan | "Ama credi e vai" | ✔ | ✔ | ✔ |
| Episode 3 (March 1) | 8 | Ekaterina Kruzhkova | 7 | Krasnoarmeysk, Moscow Oblast | "Нас учили быть птицами" | — | — | — |
| Episode 3 (March 1) | 9 | Egor Chichin | 12 | Moscow | "Белый снег" | ✔ | — | ✔ |
| Episode 3 (March 1) | 10 | Anna Zhebrovskaia | 11 | Lesnoy, Moscow Oblast | "Звезда" | — | — | — |
| Episode 3 (March 1) | 11 | Mariya Fedulova | 11 | Moscow | "Don't Stop Me Now" | — | ✔ | — |
Episode 4 (Note: Pelageya is The best coach of episode 4.) (March 7)
| Episode 4 (March 7) | 1 | Vasilisa Savkina | 9 | Moscow | "Маэстро" | — | — | — |
| Episode 4 (March 7) | 2 | Andrey Kalashov | 9 | Arzamas, Nizhny Novgorod Oblast | "Thinking Out Loud" | ✔ | ✔ | ✔ |
| Episode 4 (March 7) | 3 | Valeria Nesenyuk | 5 | Kursk | "Пони" | — | — | — |
| Episode 4 (March 7) | 4 | Alexandra Kharazyan | 10 | Moscow | "Padam, padam..." | ✔ | — | — |
| Episode 4 (March 7) | 5 | Roman Khikhinashvili | 11 | Moscow | "Writing's on the Wall" | — | — | — |
| Episode 4 (March 7) | 6 | Darya Filimonova | 8 | Mytishchi, Moscow Oblast | "Мама" | ✔ | ✔ | — |
| Episode 4 (March 7) | 7 | Ruslan Zakirov | 9 | Naberezhnye Chelny, Tatarstan | "Влюблённый солдат" | — | — | — |
| Episode 4 (March 7) | 8 | Anastasiya Ivanova | 9 | Saint Petersburg | "Stone Cold" | ✔ | ✔ | ✔ |
| Episode 4 (March 7) | 9 | Dobrynya Kirienko | 7 | Barnaul | "Будет светло" | ✔ | — | — |
| Episode 4 (March 7) | 10 | Anna Avazneli | 14 | Moscow | "Quizás, Quizás, Quizás" | ✔ | — | — |
| Episode 4 (March 7) | 11 | Alika Karpenko | 8 | Petropavlovsk-Kamchatsky | "Я падаю в небо" | ✔ | — | — |
| Episode 5 (Note: Pelageya is The best coach of episode 5.) (March 15) | 1 | Robert Bagratyan | 13 | Rostov-on-Don | "The Show Must Go On" | — | ✔ | ✔ |
| Episode 5 (March 15) | 2 | Sofiya Tikhomirova | 7 | Volgograd | "А мне бы петь и танцевать" | ✔ | — | — |
| Episode 5 (March 15) | 3 | Klimentiy Krivonosenko | 8 | Moscow | "Ночной хулиган" | — | — | — |
| Episode 5 (March 15) | 4 | Sofya Filippova | 10 | Moscow | "This Is a Man's World" | — | ✔ | ✔ |
| Episode 5 (March 15) | 5 | Mariam Abdelkader | 11 | Minsk, Belarus | "Реченька" | ✔ | ✔ | ✔ |
| Episode 5 (March 15) | 6 | Dmitriy Yadykin | 10 | Podolsk, Moscow Oblast | "Беловежская пуща" | ✔ | — | — |
| Episode 5 (March 15) | 7 | Mikella Abramova | 10 | Moscow | "Somewhere Over the Rainbow" | — | ✔ | ✔ |
| Episode 5 (March 15) | 8 | Roman Molotkov | 12 | Sychyovo, Moscow oblast | "Песенка про сапожника" | — | — | — |
| Episode 5 (March 15) | 9 | Anna Chernotalova | 14 | Samara | "All I Ask" | — | — | — |
| Episode 5 (March 15) | 10 | Zhan Makim | 9 | Almaty, Kazakhstan | "Sir Duke" | — | ✔ | — |
| Episode 5 (March 15) | 11 | Elizaveta Khupeniya | 13 | Kaluga | "Once in the Street" | — | ✔ | — |
Episode 6 (Note: Pelageya is The best coach of episode 6.) (March 22)
| Episode 6 (March 22) | 1 | Agata Barabash | 9 | Krymsk, Krasnodar Krai | "Ленинградский рок-н-ролл" | — | — | — |
| Episode 6 (March 22) | 2 | Mariam Dzhalagoniya | 12 | Moscow | "Je t'aime" | ✔ | ✔ | ✔ |
| Episode 6 (March 22) | 3 | Artyom Braylov | 8 | Saint Petersburg | "Симона" | ✔ | — | — |
| Episode 6 (March 22) | 4 | Emily Istrate | 15 | Chișinău, Moldova | "Солнышко" | — | — | — |
| Episode 6 (March 22) | 5 | Mikhail Grigoryan | 10 | Stepanakert, Azerbaijan | "Versace on the Floor" | — | ✔ | ✔ |
| Episode 6 (March 22) | 6 | Sofya Polozova | 11 | Novogorsk, Moscow Oblast | "Faith" | — | — | — |
| Episode 6 (March 22) | 7 | Valeriy Kuzakov | 10 | Yakutsk | "Santa Lucia" | ✔ | — | — |
| Episode 6 (March 22) | 8 | Anastasiya Sisauri | 14 | Ivanovo | "All About That Bass" | Team full | ✔ | ✔ |
| Episode 6 (March 22) | 9 | Alexander Dimitrievich | 9 | Sochi, Krasnodar Krai | "Мечтай" | Team full | — | — |
| Episode 6 (March 22) | 10 | Yana Khvan | 7 | Moscow | "Voyage, voyage" | Team full | ✔ | — |
| Episode 6 (March 22) | 11 | Yulia Karlina | 11 | Yoshkar-Ola | "What's Up? | Team full | Team full | ✔ |

== The Battles ==
The Battles start on March 29, 2019. Contestants who win their battle will advance to the Sing-off rounds.

Colour key

| Artist won the Battle and advanced to the Sing-offs |
| Artist was eliminated |

| Episode | Coach | Order | Winner | Song | Losers | |
|---|---|---|---|---|---|---|
| Episode 7 (March 29) (Note: Pelageya is The best coach of episode 7.) | Pelageya | 1 | Alika Karpenko | "Беспризорник" | Darya Filimonova | Dobrynya Kirienko |
| Episode 7 (March 29) | Pelageya | 2 | Renata Tairova | "Stayin' Alive" | Artyom Kukin | Anna Avazneli |
| Episode 7 (March 29) | Pelageya | 3 | Mariam Abdelkader | "Lovin' You" | Anna Glotova | Alexandra Kharazyan |
| Episode 7 (March 29) | Pelageya | 4 | Anastasiya Roginskaya | "Золотая рыбка" | Sofiya Tikhomirova | Artyom Braylov |
| Episode 7 (March 29) | Pelageya | 5 | Valeriy Kuzakov | "Nessun dorma" | Dmitriy Yadykin | Evgeniya Divenko |
| Episode 8 (April 5) (Note: Pelageya is The best coach of episode 8.) | Valery Meladze | 1 | Mariya Fedulova | "Между нами любовь" | Viktoriya Nikolaeva | Yana Ten |
| Episode 8 (April 5) | Valery Meladze | 2 | Erzhan Maksim | "Синяя вечность" | Islam Balkoev | Ivan Starikov |
| Episode 8 (April 5) | Valery Meladze | 3 | Anastasiya Sisauri | "Havana" | Elizaveta Shamieva | Elizaveta Khupeniya |
| Episode 8 (April 5) | Valery Meladze | 4 | Mitya Pukhovskiy | "Мы к вам заехали на час" | Yana Khvan | Lev Mullo |
| Episode 8 (April 5) | Valery Meladze | 5 | Mikhail Grigoryan | "Believer" | Andrey Kalashov | Zhan Makim |
| Episode 9 (April 12) (Note: Pelageya is The best coach of episode 9.) | LOBODA | 1 | Anastasiya Ivanova | "Навсегда" | Arina & Sofya Beryoziny | Yuliya Karlina |
| Episode 9 (April 12) | LOBODA | 2 | Ekaterina Gavrilyuk | "Кружит" | Arina Pekhtereva | Egor Chichin |
| Episode 9 (April 12) | LOBODA | 3 | Mikella Abramova | "Take Me to Church" | Mariya Tyuryutikova | Mariam Dzhalagoniya |
| Episode 9 (April 12) | LOBODA | 4 | Nino Chesner | "Женщина, которая поёт" / "Bohemian Rhapsody" | Elen Badalyan | Sofya Filippova |
| Episode 9 (April 12) | LOBODA | 5 | Robert Bagratyan | "UpTown Funk" | Ivan Sokhnev | Sergey Filin |

== The Sing-offs ==
The Sing-offs start on March 29. Contestants who was saved by their coaches will advance to the Final.

Colour key

| Artist was saved by his/her coach and advanced to the Final |
| Artist was eliminated but received the Comeback and advanced to the Live Extra round |

| Episode | Coach | Order | Artist | Song | Result |
|---|---|---|---|---|---|
| Episode 7 (March 29) | Pelageya | 1 | Alika Karpenko | "Я падаю в небо" | Advanced to the Live Extra round |
| Episode 7 (March 29) | Pelageya | 2 | Renata Tairova | "Canção do mar" | Advanced to the Live Extra round |
| Episode 7 (March 29) | Pelageya | 3 | Mariam Abdelkader | "Реченька" | Advanced to the Final |
| Episode 7 (March 29) | Pelageya | 4 | Anastasiya Roginskaya | "Старый рояль" | Advanced to the Live Extra round |
| Episode 7 (March 29) | Pelageya | 5 | Valeriy Kuzakov | "Santa Lucia" | Advanced to the Final |
| Episode 8 (April 5) | Valery Meladze | 1 | Mariya Fedulova | "Don't Stop Me Now" | Advanced to the Live Extra round |
| Episode 8 (April 5) | Valery Meladze | 2 | Erzhan Maxim | "Ama Credi E Vai" | Advanced to the Final |
| Episode 8 (April 5) | Valery Meladze | 3 | Anastasiya Sisauri | "All About That Bass" | Advanced to the Live Extra round |
| Episode 8 (April 5) | Valery Meladze | 4 | Mitya Pukhovskiy | "Вдоль по Питерской" | Advanced to the Live Extra round |
| Episode 8 (April 5) | Valery Meladze | 5 | Mikhail Grigoryan | "Versace on the Floor" | Advanced to the Final |
| Episode 9 (April 12) | LOBODA | 1 | Anastasiya Ivanova | "Stone Cold" | Advanced to the Live Extra round |
| Episode 9 (April 12) | LOBODA | 2 | Ekaterina Gavrilyuk | "До свиданья, мама!" | Advanced to the Live Extra round |
| Episode 9 (April 12) | LOBODA | 3 | Mikella Abramova | "Somewhere Over the Rainbow" | Advanced to the Live Extra round |
| Episode 9 (April 12) | LOBODA | 4 | Nino Chesner | "Hymne à l'amour" | Advanced to the Final |
| Episode 9 (April 12) | LOBODA | 5 | Robert Bagratyan | "The Show Must Go On" | Advanced to the Final |

== Live shows ==
Colour key

| Artist was saved by the Public's votes |
| Artist was eliminated |

=== Week 1: Live Extra round (April 19) ===
Playoff results were voted on in real time. Nine artists sang live and six of them were eliminated by the end of the night. Three saved artists advanced to the Final.

| Episode | Coach | Order | Artist | Song | Public's vote | Result |
|---|---|---|---|---|---|---|
| Episode 10 (April 19) | Pelageya | 1 | Anastasiya Roginskaya | "Испанское болеро" | 29.6% | Eliminated |
| Episode 10 (April 19) | Pelageya | 2 | Renata Tairova | "Feeling Good" | 47% | Advanced |
| Episode 10 (April 19) | Pelageya | 3 | Alika Karpenko | "Про эстраду" | 23.4% | Eliminated |
| Episode 10 (April 19) | Valery Meladze | 4 | Mariya Fedulova | "Иногда" | 10.7% | Eliminated |
| Episode 10 (April 19) | Valery Meladze | 5 | Mitya Pukhovskiy | "L'Italiano" | 41.2% | Eliminated |
| Episode 10 (April 19) | Valery Meladze | 6 | Anastasiya Sisauri | "Autumn Leaves" | 48.1% | Advanced |
| Episode 10 (April 19) | LOBODA | 7 | Ekaterina Gavrilyuk | "Жёлтые ботинки" / "Старый отель" | 18.6% | Eliminated |
| Episode 10 (April 19) | LOBODA | 8 | Anastasiya Ivanova | "Rise Like a Phoenix" | 37.6% | Eliminated |
| Episode 10 (April 19) | LOBODA | 9 | Mikella Abramova | "Герой не моего романа" | 43.8% | Advanced |

=== Week 2: Final (April 26) ===
| Episode | Coach | Order | Artist | Song | Public's vote | Result |
Episode 11 (April 26)
| Episode 11 (April 26) | Final | | | | | |
| Episode 11 (April 26) | Pelageya | 1 | Mariam Abdelkader | "History Repeating" | 14.1% | Eliminated |
| Episode 11 (April 26) | Pelageya | 2 | Valeriy Kuzakov | "Майская ночь" | 49.7% | Advanced |
| Episode 11 (April 26) | Pelageya | 3 | Renata Tairova | "Hero" | 36.2% | Eliminated |
| Episode 11 (April 26) | Valery Meladze | 4 | Anastasiya Sisauri | "Старинные часы" | 19.8% | Eliminated |
| Episode 11 (April 26) | Valery Meladze | 5 | Mikhail Grigoryan | "Вдвоём" | 39.6% | Eliminated |
| Episode 11 (April 26) | Valery Meladze | 6 | Erzhan Maxim | "All by Myself" | 40.6% | Advanced |
| Episode 11 (April 26) | LOBODA | 7 | Mikella Abramova | "Love the Way You Lie" | 61.8% | Advanced |
| Episode 11 (April 26) | LOBODA | 8 | Nino Chesner | "Вечная любовь" / "Padam, padam" | 20.2% | Eliminated |
| Episode 11 (April 26) | LOBODA | 9 | Robert Bagratyan | "Still Loving You" / "The Final Countdown" | 18% | Eliminated |
| Episode 11 (April 26) | Super Final | | | | | |
| Episode 11 (April 26) | Pelageya | 1 | Valeriy Kuzakov | "Как молоды мы были" | 15.6% | Third place |
| Episode 11 (April 26) | Valery Meladze | 2 | Erzhan Maxim | "Adagio" | 27.9% | Runner-up |
| Episode 11 (April 26) | LOBODA | 3 | Mikella Abramova | "Ты здесь" | 56.5% | Winner |

Non-competition performances
| Order | Performer | Song |
|---|---|---|
| 11.1 | All finalists of season 6 | "A Million Voices" |
| 11.2 | Pelageya and her team (Valeriy Kuzakov, Renata Tairova, and Mariam Abdelkader) | "Любо, братцы, любо" |
| 11.3 | Valery Meladze and his team (Erzhan Maxim, Mikhail Grigoryan, and Anastasiya Sisauri) | "Сэра" |
| 11.4 | LOBODA and her team (Nino Chesner, Mikella Abramova, and Robert Bagratyan) | "SuperSTAR" |
| 11.5 | Mikella Abramova (winner) | "Somewhere Over the Rainbow" |
| 11.6 | All artists on season 6 | "The Winner Takes It All" |

Second Final Round results were voted on in real time. Top 3 artists sang live and Mikella Abramova won the competition. However, the results have been cancelled due to external manipulation of votes. There was no winner to this season because of the manipulation. BBC reports: "Clearly this is just a TV show. But to some it reflects a wider, unpleasant reality: using money and status to sway a vote. People have shrugged that off for years in politics. But the idea that dirty practices tainted a children's talent contest has angered them.”

While many fans stated that Mikella was a decent performer, the scale of her victory was distinctly fishy, especially with some believing her vocals to be shaky. Notably, her pop-star mum, Alsou, had called openly for support: she has more than two million Instagram followers. Additionally, reports of factory workers being paid to vote added to the sense of scandal.

Valery Meladze stated the need to review the voting results. Aglaya Shilovskaya admitted that the result of the superfinal was unexpected for the presenters and the management of Channel One: "I can guarantee that this was not bought by Channel One. Channel One has absolutely nothing to do with this. It was a big surprise for everyone.". Dmitry Nagiev said: "If it turns out that there were at least some machinations, I am in favor of canceling the results of the final and making an honest final".. Later, Nagiyev announced his readiness to leave the show if the rules of television voting do not change.

LOBODA's producer Natella Krapivina said that the "story" of the Voice is "over", and the singer herself posted photos of two other members of her team on Instagram, accompanying the pictures with a heart emoji.

In the late afternoon of April 27, 2019, news agencies posted a comment by Konstantin Ernst, in which the CEO confirmed that the channel's management had encountered such a situation for the first time in the entire history of the project and an investigation would be conducted. The first step was the publication of the voting protocol on the website of Channel One.

On April 28, 2019, it became known that Alla Pugacheva met with the finalists of the competition Erzhan Maxim, Nino Chesner, Robert Bagratyan and Anastasiya Ivanova, who presented them with her own awards, diplomas and cash prizes. LOBODA was also present at the meeting and distributed her prizes to the children.

On May 16, 2019, Channel One announced the cancellation of the result of the sixth season finale after checking the interim voting results. Earlier, Group-IB reported that a "fraud" of votes was recorded during the voting: "The interim results of the audit confirm that the voting was influenced by an external influence that influenced the outcome of the show. Group-IB will provide the final report by the end of May, but based on the interim results, Channel One decides to cancel the result of the finale of the sixth season of The Voice Kids. It is important to emphasize that the purpose of the audit was to confirm or deny the fact of artificial influence on the vote, and not to bring charges against anyone. Channel One will also take measures to improve and further protect the voting mechanism and ensure that what happened does not happen again

=== Week 3: (re-)Final (May 24) ===
While the show was shown live, the coaches were not present. Each had recorded a greeting to their team. Artists performed the following songs, however there was no voting.

| Episode | Coach | Order | Artist | Song |
|---|---|---|---|---|
| Episode 12 (May 24) | Pelageya | 1 | Mariam Abdelkader | "Высоко" |
| Episode 12 (May 24) | Pelageya | 2 | Valeriy Kuzakov | "Как молоды мы были" |
| Episode 12 (May 24) | Pelageya | 3 | Renata Tairova | "Там нет меня" |
| Episode 12 (May 24) | LOBODA | 4 | Nino Chesner | "Мамины глаза" |
| Episode 12 (May 24) | LOBODA | 5 | Robert Bagratyan | "Дорогоие мои старики" |
| Episode 12 (May 24) | Valery Meladze | 6 | Mikhail Grigoryan | "Прохожие" |
| Episode 12 (May 24) | Valery Meladze | 7 | Erzhan Maxim | "Adagio" |
| Episode 12 (May 24) | Valery Meladze | 8 | Anastasiya Sisauri | "Любовь спасёт мир" |

After the performances The CEO of Channel One Russia, Konstantin Ernst came on stage and declared all final participants as winner. Each participant including Mikella Abramova was handed a trophy and will receive the winning prize of ₽1 mln.

== Best Coach ==
Colour key

- Best Coach
- Second place
- Third place

- Episode's Best Coach

| Coach | Public's vote _{(per episode)} | | | | | | | | | | Result |
| Coach | #1 | #2 | #3 | #4 | #5 | #6 | #7 | #8 | #9 | Av. | Result |
|---|---|---|---|---|---|---|---|---|---|---|---|
| Pelageya | 57% | 54% | 58% | 54% | 56% | 58% | 65% | 52% | 46% | 56% | Best Coach |
| Valery Meladze | 30% | 27% | 25% | 24% | 24% | 27% | 20% | 31% | 19% | 25% | Second place |
| LOBODA | 13% | 19% | 17% | 22% | 20% | 15% | 15% | 17% | 35% | 19% | Third place |

== Reception ==
=== Rating ===
| Episode | | Original airdate | Production | Time slot (UTC+3) | Audience | | Source |
| Episode | | Original airdate | Production | Time slot (UTC+3) | Rating | Share | Source |
|---|---|---|---|---|---|---|---|
| 1 | "The Blind Auditions Premiere" | February 15, 2019 | 601 | Friday 9:30 p.m. | 6.3 | 21.1 | |
| 2 | "The Blind Auditions, Part 2" | February 22, 2019 | 602 | Friday 9:30 p.m. | 5.7 | 18.3 | |
| 3 | "The Blind Auditions, Part 3" | March 1, 2019 | 603 | Friday 9:30 p.m. | 5.5 | 18.4 | |
| 4 | "The Blind Auditions, Part 4" | March 7, 2019 | 604 | Thursday 9:30 p.m. | 4.1 | 14.7 | |
| 5 | "The Blind Auditions, Part 5" | March 15, 2019 | 605 | Friday 9:30 p.m. | 5.1 | 17.5 | |
| 6 | "The Blinds End" | March 22, 2019 | 606 | Friday 10:30 p.m. | 4.3 | 18.2 | |
| 7 | "The Battles and the Sing-offs Premiere" | March 29, 2019 | 607 | Friday 9:30 p.m. | 4.6 | 16.3 | |
| 8 | "The Battles and the Sing-offs, Part 2" | April 5, 2019 | 608 | Friday 9:30 p.m. | 4.6 | 16.2 | |
| 9 | "The Battles and the Sing-offs, Part 3" | April 12, 2019 | 609 | Friday 9:30 p.m. | 4.3 | 15.9 | |
| 10 | "Live Playoffs" | April 19, 2019 | 610 | Friday 9:30 p.m. | 4.0 | 14.2 | |
| 11 | "Live Season Final" | April 26, 2019 | 611 | Friday 9:30 p.m. | 4.6 | 18.7 | |
| 12 | "Special Final Edition" | May 24, 2019 | 612 | Friday 9:30 p.m. | 4.2 | 16.4 | |
