= The Voice Kids (Russian TV series) season 5 =

The Voice Kids
- Season 5
- Presented by: Dmitry Nagiev; Agata Muceniece
- Coaches: Basta; Pelageya; Valery Meladze
- Winner: Rutger Garekht
- Winning coach: Pelageya
- Runner-up: Sofiya Fyodorova

Release
- Original network: Channel One
- Original release: February 2 – April 20, 2018

Season chronology
- ← Previous; Season 4 Next → Season 6

The fifth season of the Russian reality talent show The Voice Kids premiered on February 2, 2018, on Channel One. Dmitry Nagiev returned as the show's presenter, Agata Muceniece replaced Svetlana Zeynalova as a co-presenter. Valery Meladze returned as coach while Pelageya, who returned after a one-season break, replaced Nyusha and Basta replaced Dima Bilan.

Rutger Garekht was announced the winner on April 20, 2018, marking Pelageya's first win as a coach and the first female coach to win in the show's history.

== Coaches and presenters ==
The Voice Kids season 5 coaches

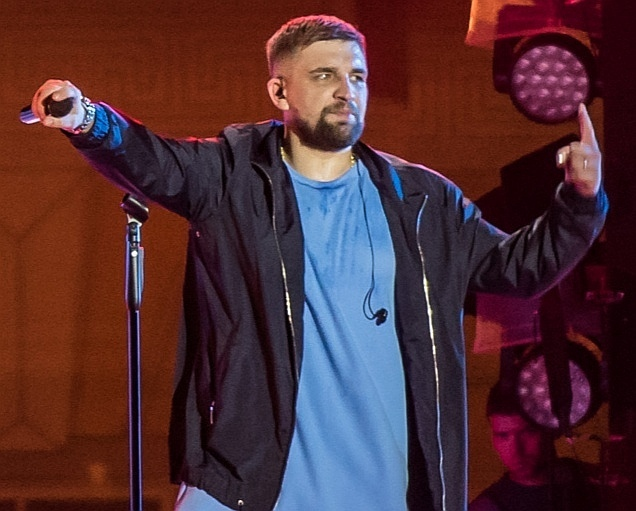
Basta

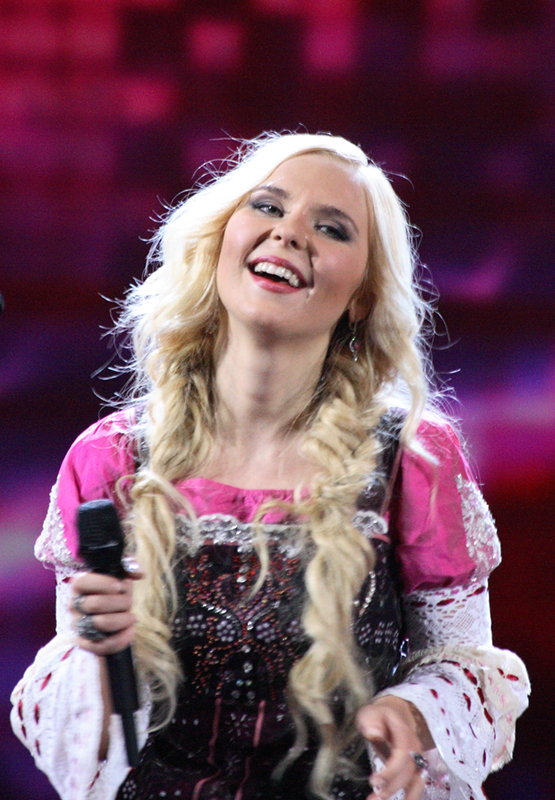
Pelageya

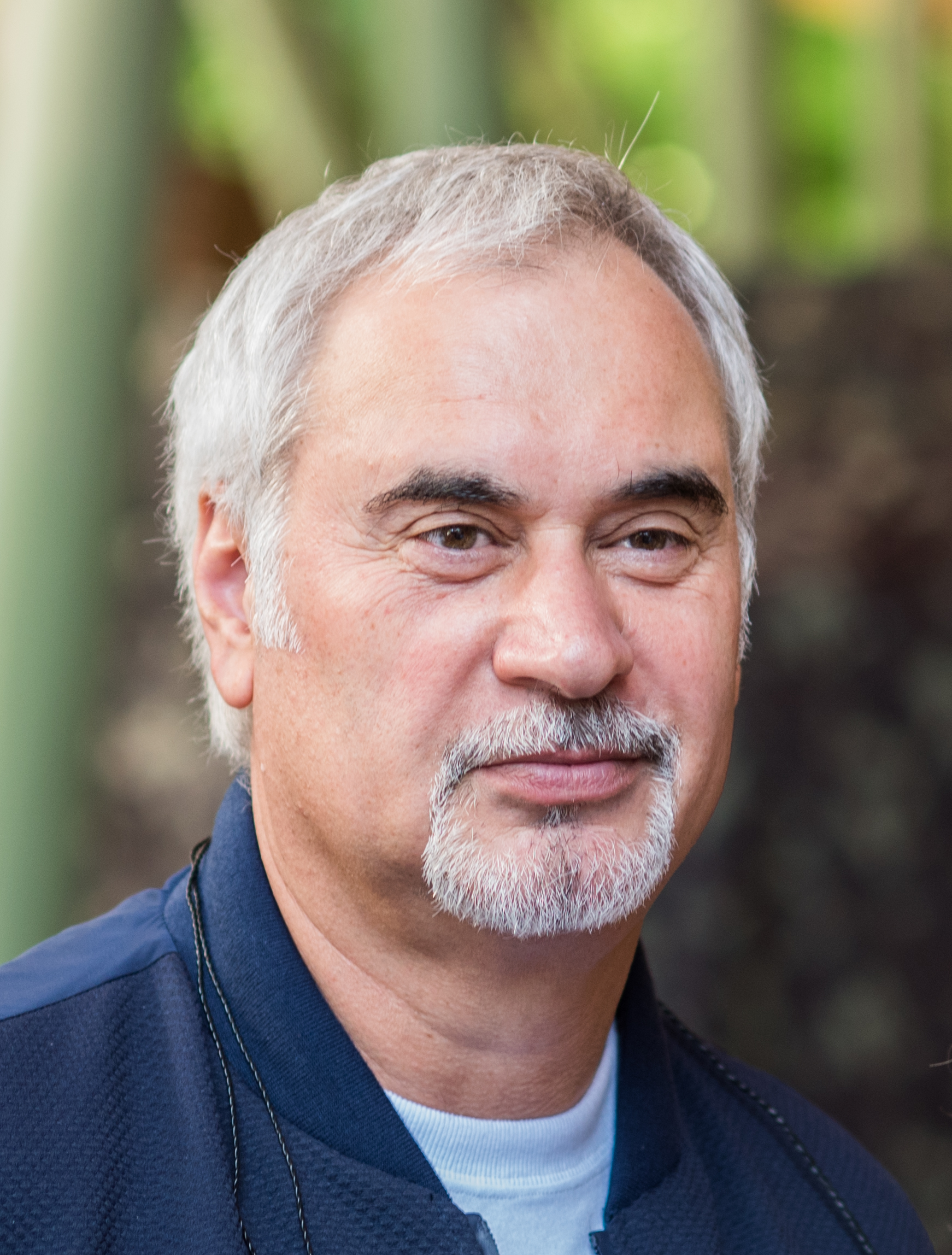
Valery Meladze

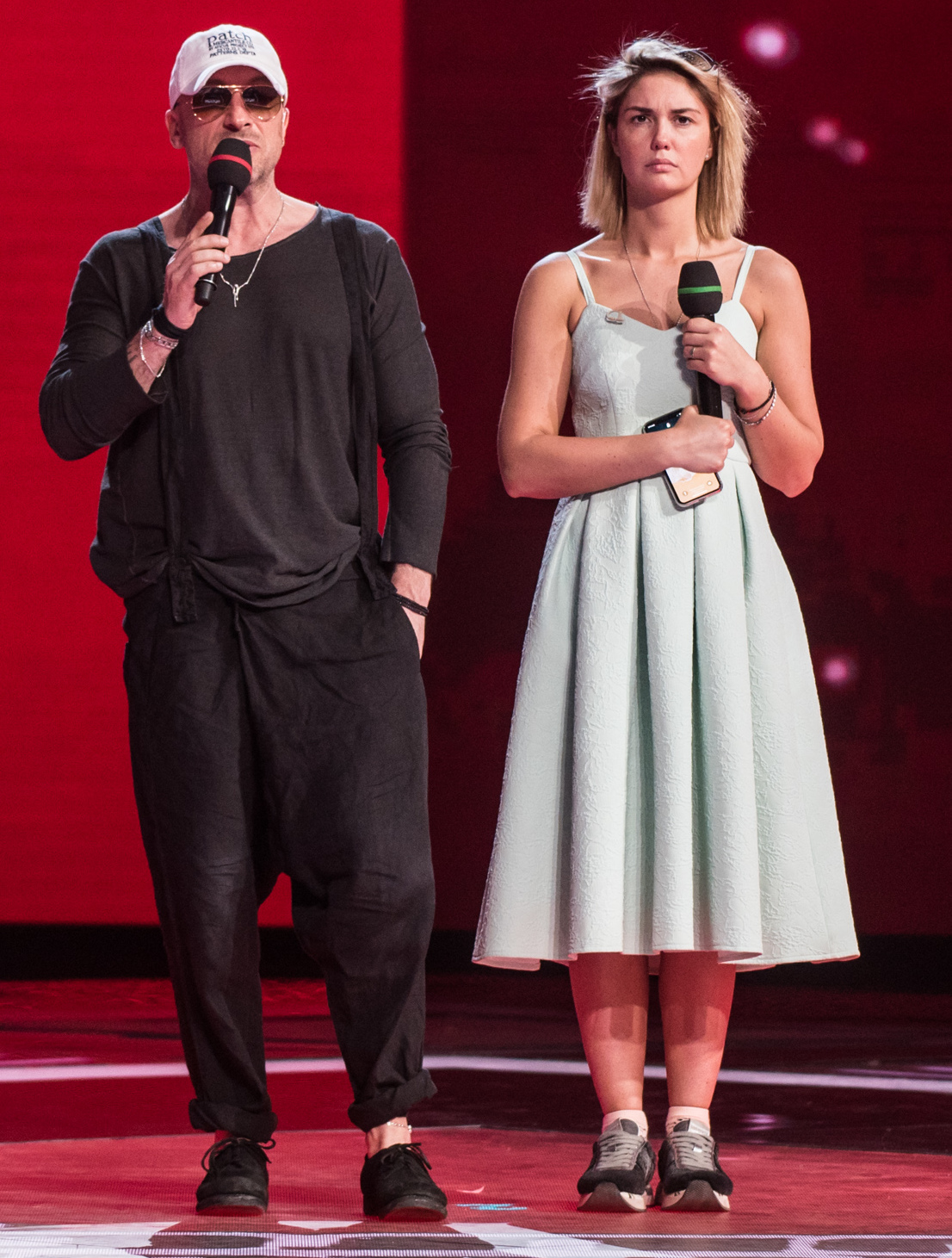
Dmitry Nagiev and Agata Muceniece

Valery Meladze was joined by Pelageya, who returned after a one-season break and replaced Nyusha, and Basta who replaced Dima Bilan. Dmitry Nagiev was joined by Agata Muceniece, who replaced Svetlana Zeynalova.

== Teams ==
Colour key

- Winner
- Runner-up
- Third place

- Eliminated in the Final
- Eliminated in the Live Extra round
- Eliminated in the Battle rounds

| Coaches | Top 45 Artists | | | | |
|---|---|---|---|---|---|
| Basta | | | | | |
| Basta | Sofiya Fyodorova | Akmal Khodzhaniyazov | Alexandra Ushakova | Elizaveta Labodina | Elvira Apsheva |
| Basta | Kirill Rogovets-Zakon | Mikhail Noginskiy | Alina Sidorova | Milena Lukyantseva | Viktoriya Antonyan |
| Basta | Anastasiya Grigoryeva | Erik Panich | Daya Borisova | Darya Sitnikova | Nazgul Otuzova |
| Pelageya | | | | | |
| Pelageya | Rutger Garekht | Veronika Syromlya | Eden Golan | Angelina Galetskaya | Leonid Novozhilov |
| Pelageya | Darya Volosevich | Alina Domracheva | Lavalina Sandeep Nair | Anton Melnikov | Nikol Alekseeva |
| Pelageya | Zakhar Usenko | Stepan Shlyapkin | Veronika Inkiko | Robert Kasyan | Mikhail Sandalov |
| Valery Meladze | | | | | |
| Valery Meladze | Anastasiya Gladilina | Olesya Masheyko | Tali Kuper | Evelina Bolshakova | David Khinikadze |
| Valery Meladze | Aliya Enikeeva | Emiliya Khayrieva | Nikita Belko | Kira Danilina | Alisa Khilko |
| Valery Meladze | Mariya Magilnaya | Sara Abramyan | Vadim Yakushev | Anton Subbotin | Vadim Tsagareyshvili |
Note: Italicized names are stolen contestants (who were eliminated in the Sing-offs, but were stolen in the Live Extra round and advanced to the Final).

== Blind auditions ==
Colour key

| ✔ | Coach pressed "I WANT YOU" button |
| | Artist defaulted to a coach's team |
| | Artist picked a coach's team |
| | Artist eliminated with no coach pressing their button |

The coaches performed "Abracadabra" at the start of the show.

| Episode | Order | Artist | Age | Hometown | Song | Coach's and artist's choices | | |
| Episode | Order | Artist | Age | Hometown | Song | Basta | Pelageya | Meladze |
|---|---|---|---|---|---|---|---|---|
| Episode 1 (February 2) | 1 | Mikhail Sandalov | 7 | Khimki, Moscow Oblast | "Очки-тапочки" | ✔ | ✔ | — |
| Episode 1 (February 2) | 2 | Milena Lukyantseva | 13 | Vladivostok | "Чёрный кот" | ✔ | — | ✔ |
| Episode 1 (February 2) | 3 | Michael Pinchuk | 11 | Novosibirsk | "The Way You Make Me Feel" | — | — | — |
| Episode 1 (February 2) | 4 | Alina Domracheva | 9 | Balashikha, Moscow Oblast | "Валенки" | — | ✔ | — |
| Episode 1 (February 2) | 5 | Robert Kasyan | 13 | Krasnodar | "Parlami d'Amore Mariu" | ✔ | ✔ | ✔ |
| Episode 1 (February 2) | 6 | Aglaya Kukushkina | 8 | Moscow | "Сверчок за печкою" | — | — | — |
| Episode 1 (February 2) | 7 | David Khinikadze | 9 | Moscow | "Buleria" | ✔ | — | ✔ |
| Episode 1 (February 2) | 8 | Alisa Khilko | 10 | Moscow | "Fallin'" | — | — | ✔ |
| Episode 1 (February 2) | 9 | Zakhar Usenko | 12 | Vladimir | "Улица роз" | — | ✔ | — |
| Episode 1 (February 2) | 10 | Polina Terekhova | 10 | Kazan | "Roar" | — | — | — |
| Episode 1 (February 2) | 11 | Alexandra Ushakova | 15 | Mytishchi, Moscow Oblast | "Tough Lover" | ✔ | — | — |
Episode 2 (February 9)
| Episode 2 (February 9) | 1 | Daniel Ulbaev | 10 | Moscow | "Симона" | — | — | — |
| Episode 2 (February 9) | 2 | Anastasiya Gladilina | 13 | Bryansk | "If I Were a Boy" | ✔ | ✔ | ✔ |
| Episode 2 (February 9) | 3 | Anton Subbotin | 7 | Saint Petersburg | "Santa Lucia" | ✔ | — | ✔ |
| Episode 2 (February 9) | 4 | Veronika Syromlya | 13 | Sevastopol, Ukraine | "Подари мне платок" | — | ✔ | — |
| Episode 2 (February 9) | 5 | Mariya Rudenko | 7 | Kazan | "Who's Lovin' You" | — | — | — |
| Episode 2 (February 9) | 6 | Rutger Garekht | 11 | Orenburg | "Я милого узнаю по походке" | ✔ | ✔ | ✔ |
| Episode 2 (February 9) | 7 | Anastasia Kormishina | 10 | Penza | "A Song for You" | — | — | — |
| Episode 2 (February 9) | 8 | Nikita Belko | 12 | Minsk, Belarus | "You Raise Me Up" | ✔ | — | ✔ |
| Episode 2 (February 9) | 9 | Sofiya Fyodorova | 10 | Moscow | "Кажется" | ✔ | — | — |
| Episode 2 (February 9) | 10 | Egor Ermolaev | 11 | Moscow | "Love Yourself" | — | — | — |
| Episode 2 (February 9) | 11 | Viktoriya Antonyan | 13 | Moscow | "My Funny Valentine" | ✔ | — | — |
| Episode 3 (February 16) | 1 | Aliya Enikeeva | 15 | Moscow | "Дорогой длинною" | ✔ | — | ✔ |
| Episode 3 (February 16) | 2 | Andrey Kalashov | 8 | Nizhniy Novgorod | "Attention" | — | — | — |
| Episode 3 (February 16) | 3 | Stepan Shlyapkin | 11 | Rostov-on-Don | "Не для тебя" | — | ✔ | — |
| Episode 3 (February 16) | 4 | Lavalina Sandeep Nair | 8 | Dubai, United Arab Emirates | "Oops!... I Did It Again" | ✔ | ✔ | ✔ |
| Episode 3 (February 16) | 5 | Kamilla Astanakulova | 14 | Termez, Uzbekistan | "Вальс Джульетты" | — | — | — |
| Episode 3 (February 16) | 6 | Anton Melnikov | 10 | Krasnoyarsk | "Мама" | ✔ | ✔ | — |
| Episode 3 (February 16) | 7 | Mariya Magilnaya | 13 | Mogilev, Belarus | "Stone Cold" | ✔ | — | ✔ |
| Episode 3 (February 16) | 8 | Evelina Bolshakova | 9 | Moscow | "I Just Can't Wait to Be King" | — | — | ✔ |
| Episode 3 (February 16) | 9 | Artur Islamov | 12 | Orenburg | "Лучший город Земли" | — | — | — |
| Episode 3 (February 16) | 10 | Elvira Apsheva | 14 | Moscow | "Runnin'" | ✔ | — | — |
| Episode 3 (February 16) | 11 | Kirill Rogovets-Zakon | 13 | Kyiv, Ukraine | "Hello" | ✔ | — | — |
Episode 4 (February 22)
| Episode 4 (February 22) | 1 | Erik Arakelyan | 11 | Kaluga | "Ах, эта девушка" | — | — | — |
| Episode 4 (February 22) | 2 | Nikol Alekseeva | 6 | Vilnius, Lithuania | "Любочка" | ✔ | ✔ | — |
| Episode 4 (February 22) | 3 | Nazgul Otuzova | 14 | Yangatau, Bashkortostan | "Adagio" | ✔ | ✔ | ✔ |
| Episode 4 (February 22) | 4 | Vadim Tsagareyshvili | 13 | Moscow | "Strangers in the Night" | ✔ | — | ✔ |
| Episode 4 (February 22) | 5 | Darya Sitnikova | 13 | Saint Petersburg | "Олей" | ✔ | — | — |
| Episode 4 (February 22) | 6 | Mikhail Medvedskiy | 10 | Saint Petersburg | "Runaway Baby" | — | — | — |
| Episode 4 (February 22) | 7 | Olesya Masheyko | 11 | Kazan | "Грею счастье" | — | — | ✔ |
| Episode 4 (February 22) | 8 | Daniil Kupch | 7 | Almaty, Kazakhstan | "Ай-яй-яй" | — | — | — |
| Episode 4 (February 22) | 9 | Tali Kuper | 11 | Ashdod, Israel | "Who Wants to Live Forever" | — | ✔ | ✔ |
| Episode 4 (February 22) | 10 | Anton Panzin | 10 | Nizhny Novgorod | "Locked Out of Heaven" | — | — | — |
| Episode 4 (February 22) | 11 | Darya Volosevich | 14 | Uglich, Yaroslavl Oblast | "Самый дорогой человек" | — | ✔ | — |
| Episode 5 (March 7) | 1 | Leonid Novozhilov | 7 | Nizhny Novgorod | "Белеет мой парус" | — | ✔ | ✔ |
| Episode 5 (March 7) | 2 | Veronika Inkiko | 13 | Monte Castello di Vibio, Italy | "Blow Your Mind" | ✔ | ✔ | ✔ |
| Episode 5 (March 7) | 3 | Nikita Nikiforov | 9 | Karabanovo, Vladimir Oblast | "Волшебник-недоучка" | — | — | — |
| Episode 5 (March 7) | 4 | Elizaveta Labodina | 12 | Tolyatti, Samara oblast | "Something New" | ✔ | — | ✔ |
| Episode 5 (March 7) | 5 | Anastasiya Grigoryeva | 7 | Saint Petersburg | "Леди Совершенство" | ✔ | — | — |
| Episode 5 (March 7) | 6 | Karen Ayrapetov | 14 | Moscow | "Как ты красива сегодня" | — | — | — |
| Episode 5 (March 7) | 7 | Emiliya Khayrieva | 11 | Mamadysh, Tatarstan | "Челита" | ✔ | ✔ | ✔ |
| Episode 5 (March 7) | 8 | Mariya Petrova | 13 | Moscow | "I Got Rhythm" | — | — | — |
| Episode 5 (March 7) | 9 | Mikhail Noginskiy | 13 | Moscow | "Love Me Again" | ✔ | — | — |
| Episode 5 (March 7) | 10 | Alina Sidorova | 14 | Saint Petersburg | "Я не отступлю" | ✔ | — | — |
| Episode 5 (March 7) | 11 | Vadim Yakushev | 14 | Petrozavodsk | "Whole Lotta Love" | — | — | ✔ |
Episode 6 (March 16)
| Episode 6 (March 16) | 1 | Yana Pak | 6 | Khabarovsk | "Эй, вы там наверху!" | — | — | — |
| Episode 6 (March 16) | 2 | Erik Panich | 13 | Vienna, Austria | "Radioactive" | ✔ | — | — |
| Episode 6 (March 16) | 3 | Darya Cherenkova | 12 | Moscow | "Спят усталые игрушки" | — | — | — |
| Episode 6 (March 16) | 4 | Akmal Khodzhaniyazov | 14 | Saint Petersburg | "This Is a Man's World" | ✔ | ✔ | ✔ |
| Episode 6 (March 16) | 5 | Kira Danilina | 8 | Moscow | "Let's Twist Again" | ✔ | — | ✔ |
| Episode 6 (March 16) | 6 | Michael Heidemann | 13 | Hamburg, Germany | "Funiculì, Funiculà" | — | — | — |
| Episode 6 (March 16) | 7 | Sara Abramyan | 10 | Sukhumi, Abkhazia | "Драмы больше нет" | ✔ | — | ✔ |
| Episode 6 (March 16) | 8 | Eden Golan | 14 | Kfar Saba, Israel / Moscow | "Love on the Brain" | ✔ | ✔ | Team full |
| Episode 6 (March 16) | 9 | Daniel Yastremskiy | 13 | Minsk, Belarus | "Зачем тебе любовь моя?" | — | — | Team full |
| Episode 6 (March 16) | 10 | Daya Borisova | 13 | Barnaul | "Hit 'em Up Style" | ✔ | — | Team full |
| Episode 6 (March 16) | 11 | Angelina Galetskaya | 11 | Ryazan | "Dangerous Woman" | Team full | ✔ | Team full |

== The Battles ==
The Battles round started with the first half of episode 7 and ended with the first half of episode 9 (broadcast on March 23, 30, 2018; on April 6, 2018). Contestants who win their battle will advance to the Sing-off rounds.

Colour key

| Artist won the Battle and advanced to the Sing-offs |
| Artist was eliminated |

| Episode | Coach | Order | Winner | Song | Losers | |
|---|---|---|---|---|---|---|
| Episode 7 (March 23) | Valery Meladze | 1 | Evelina Bolshakova | "Вася" | Kira Danilina | Anton Subbotin |
| Episode 7 (March 23) | Valery Meladze | 2 | Anastasiya Gladilina | "No Roots" | Aliya Enikeeva | Mariya Magilnaya |
| Episode 7 (March 23) | Valery Meladze | 3 | David Khinikadze | "Твои глаза" | Vadim Tsagareyshvili | Alisa Khilko |
| Episode 7 (March 23) | Valery Meladze | 4 | Olesya Masheyko | "Посидим, поокаем" | Sara Abramyan | Emiliya Khayrieva |
| Episode 7 (March 23) | Valery Meladze | 5 | Tali Kuper | "Cryin'" | Vadim Yakushev | Nikita Belko |
| Episode 8 (March 30) | Pelageya | 1 | Rutger Garekht | "За окошком месяц май" | Darya Volosevich | Zakhar Usenko |
| Episode 8 (March 30) | Pelageya | 2 | Eden Golan | "Yalla" | Veronika Inkiko | Lavalina Sandip Nair |
| Episode 8 (March 30) | Pelageya | 3 | Angelina Galetskaya | "Volare" | Robert Kasyan | Anton Melnikov |
| Episode 8 (March 30) | Pelageya | 4 | Leonid Novozhilov | "Пони" | Mikhail Sandalov | Nikol Alekseeva |
| Episode 8 (March 30) | Pelageya | 5 | Veronika Syromlya | "Ой, при лужку, при лужке" | Alina Domracheva | Stepan Shlyapkin |
| Episode 9 (April 6) | Basta | 1 | Sofiya Fedorova | "Нас не догонят" | Kirill Rogovets-Zakon | Anastasiya Grigoryeva |
| Episode 9 (April 6) | Basta | 2 | Akmal Khodzhaniyazov | "Кофе - мой друг" | Mikhail Noginskiy | Erik Panich |
| Episode 9 (April 6) | Basta | 3 | Alexandra Ushakova | "Single Ladies" | Alina Sidorova | Daya Borisova |
| Episode 9 (April 6) | Basta | 4 | Elvira Apsheva | "Set Fire to the Rain" | Viktoriya Antonyan | Nazgul Otuzova |
| Episode 9 (April 6) | Basta | 5 | Elizaveta Labodina | "Боже, какой пустяк" | Milena Lukyantseva | Darya Sitnikova |

== The Sing-offs ==
The Sing-offs round started with the second half of episode 7 and ended with the second half of episode 9 (broadcast on March 23, 30, 2018; on April 6, 2018). Contestants who was saved by their coaches will advance to the Final.

Colour key

| Artist was saved by his/her coach and advanced to the Final |
| Artist was eliminated but received the Comeback and advanced to the Live Extra round |

| Episode | Coach | Order | Artist | Song | Result |
|---|---|---|---|---|---|
| Episode 7 (March 23) | Valery Meladze | 1 | Evelina Bolshakova | "I Just Can't Wait to Be King" | Advanced to the Live Extra round |
| Episode 7 (March 23) | Valery Meladze | 2 | Anastasiya Gladilina | "If I Were a Boy" | Advanced to the Final |
| Episode 7 (March 23) | Valery Meladze | 3 | David Khinikadze | "Buleria" | Advanced to the Live Extra round |
| Episode 7 (March 23) | Valery Meladze | 4 | Olesya Masheyko | "Грею счастье" | Advanced to the Live Extra round |
| Episode 7 (March 23) | Valery Meladze | 5 | Tali Kuper | "Who Wants to Live Forever" | Advanced to the Final |
| Episode 8 (March 30) | Pelageya | 1 | Rutger Garekht | "Я милого узнаю по походке" | Advanced to the Final |
| Episode 8 (March 30) | Pelageya | 2 | Eden Golan | "Love on the Brain" | Advanced to the Live Extra round |
| Episode 8 (March 30) | Pelageya | 3 | Angelina Galetskaya | "Dangerous Woman" | Advanced to the Live Extra round |
| Episode 8 (March 30) | Pelageya | 4 | Leonid Novozhilov | "Белеет мой парус" | Advanced to the Live Extra round |
| Episode 8 (March 30) | Pelageya | 5 | Veronika Syromlya | "Подари мне платок" | Advanced to the Final |
| Episode 9 (April 6) | Basta | 1 | Sofiya Fedorova | "Кажется" | Advanced to the Live Extra round |
| Episode 9 (April 6) | Basta | 2 | Akmal Khodzhiniyazov | "This is a Man's World" | Advanced to the Final |
| Episode 9 (April 6) | Basta | 3 | Alexandra Ushakova | "Tough Lover" | Advanced to the Final |
| Episode 9 (April 6) | Basta | 4 | Elvira Apsheva | "Runnin'" | Advanced to the Live Extra round |
| Episode 9 (April 6) | Basta | 5 | Elizaveta Labodina | "Something New" | Advanced to the Live Extra round |

== Live shows ==
Colour key

| Artist was saved by the public's votes |
| Artist was eliminated |

=== Week 1: Live Extra round (April 13) ===
As with season 2, each coach saved three artists who were eliminated in the sing-offs. Playoff results were voted on in real time. Nine artists sang live and six of them were eliminated by the end of the night. Three saved artists advanced to the Final.

| Episode | Coach | Order | Artist | Song | Public's vote | Result |
|---|---|---|---|---|---|---|
| Episode 10 (April 13) | Pelageya | 1 | Leonid Novozhilov | "Ничего на свете лучше нету" | 30.8% | Eliminated |
| Episode 10 (April 13) | Pelageya | 2 | Eden Golan | "Мама моя" | 37% | Advanced |
| Episode 10 (April 13) | Pelageya | 3 | Angelina Galetskaya | "History Repeating" | 32.2% | Eliminated |
| Episode 10 (April 13) | Valery Meladze | 4 | Olesya Masheyko | "Куда уходит детство" | 50.5% | Advanced |
| Episode 10 (April 13) | Valery Meladze | 5 | Evelina Bolshakova | "Песня царевны Забавы" | 20% | Eliminated |
| Episode 10 (April 13) | Valery Meladze | 6 | David Khinikadze | "Baila Morena" | 29.5% | Eliminated |
| Episode 10 (April 13) | Basta | 7 | Elizaveta Labodina | "Лететь" | 31.4% | Eliminated |
| Episode 10 (April 13) | Basta | 8 | Sofiya Fyodorova | "Torn" | 38.2% | Advanced |
| Episode 10 (April 13) | Basta | 9 | Elvira Apsheva | "Разные люди" | 30.4% | Eliminated |

Non-competition performances
| Order | Performer | Song |
|---|---|---|
| 10.1 | Sergey Bezrukov and Team Pelageya (Leonid Novozhilov, Eden Golan, and Angelina Galetskaya) | "Берёзы" |
| 10.2 | Ani Lorak and Team Valery Meladze (Olesya Masheyko, Evelina Bolshakova, and David Khinikadze) | "Сопрано" |
| 10.3 | Uma2rman and Team Basta (Elizaveta Labodina, Sofiya Fyodorova, and Elvira Apsheva) | "Проститься" |

=== Week 2: Final (April 20) ===
| Episode | Coach | Order | Artist | Song | Public's vote | Result |
Episode 11 (April 20)
| Episode 11 (April 20) | Final | | | | | |
| Episode 11 (April 20) | Valery Meladze | 1 | Tali Kuper | "Снится сон" | 11.2% | Eliminated |
| Episode 11 (April 20) | Valery Meladze | 2 | Olesya Masheyko | "Аист на крыше" | 25.5% | Eliminated |
| Episode 11 (April 20) | Valery Meladze | 3 | Anastasiya Gladilina | "Ой, ты, степь широкая" | 63.3% | Advanced |
| Episode 11 (April 20) | Pelageya | 4 | Eden Golan | "All About That Bass" | 8.2% | Eliminated |
| Episode 11 (April 20) | Pelageya | 5 | Veronika Syromlya | "Поговори со мною, мама" | 42.8% | Eliminated |
| Episode 11 (April 20) | Pelageya | 6 | Rutger Garekht | "Журавль по небу летит" | 49% | Advanced |
| Episode 11 (April 20) | Basta | 7 | Akmal Khodzhaniyazov | "They Don't Care About Us" | 44% | Eliminated |
| Episode 11 (April 20) | Basta | 8 | Sofiya Fyodorova | "Мама" | 49.8% | Advanced |
| Episode 11 (April 20) | Basta | 9 | Alexandra Ushakova | "Скандал" | 6.2% | Eliminated |
| Episode 11 (April 20) | Super Final | | | | | |
| Episode 11 (April 20) | Valery Meladze | 1 | Anastasiya Gladilina | "Я тебя никогда не забуду" | 24.3% | Third place |
| Episode 11 (April 20) | Pelageya | 2 | Rutger Garekht | "Офицеры" | 49.1% | Winner |
| Episode 11 (April 20) | Basta | 3 | Sofiya Fyodorova | "На десерт" | 26.6% | Runner-up |

Non-competition performances
| Order | Performer | Song |
|---|---|---|
| 11.1 | Now United | "Summer in the City" |
| 11.2 | Valery Meladze and his team (Tali Kuper, Olesya Masheyko, and Anastasiya Gladilina) | "Сэра" |
| 11.3 | Pelageya and her team (Eden Golan, Veronika Syromlya, and Rutger Garekht) | "Цвiте терен" |
| 11.4 | Basta and his team (Akmal Khodzhaniyazov, Sofiya Fyodorova, and Alexandra Ushakova) | "Сансара" |
| 11.5 | Rutger Garekht (winner) | "Журавль по небу летит" |

== Reception ==
=== Rating ===
| Episode | | Original airdate | Production | Time slot (UTC+3) | Audience | | Source |
| Episode | | Original airdate | Production | Time slot (UTC+3) | Rating | Share | Source |
|---|---|---|---|---|---|---|---|
| 1 | "The Blind Auditions Premiere" | February 2, 2018 | 501 | Friday 9:30 p.m. | 6.7 | 20.5 | |
| 2 | "The Blind Auditions, Part 2" | February 9, 2018 | 502 | Friday 9:30 p.m. | 5.6 | 17.9 | |
| 3 | "The Blind Auditions, Part 3" | February 16, 2018 | 503 | Friday 9:30 p.m. | 5.7 | 17.4 | |
| 4 | "The Blind Auditions, Part 4" | February 22, 2018 | 504 | Thursday 9:30 p.m. | 5.4 | 16.5 | |
| 5 | "The Blind Auditions, Part 5" | March 7, 2018 | 505 | Wednesday 9:30 p.m. | 5.0 | 16.5 | |
| 6 | "The Blinds End" | March 16, 2018 | 506 | Friday 9:30 p.m. | 5.2 | 17.7 | |
| 7 | "The Battles and the Sing-offs Premiere" | March 23, 2018 | 507 | Friday 9:30 p.m. | 5.4 | 18.2 | |
| 8 | "The Battles and the Sing-offs, Part 2" | March 30, 2018 | 508 | Friday 9:30 p.m. | 5.7 | 18.7 | |
| 9 | "The Battles and the Sing-offs, Part 3" | April 6, 2018 | 509 | Friday 9:30 p.m. | 4.6 | 15.2 | |
| 10 | "Live Playoffs" | April 13, 2018 | 510 | Friday 9:30 p.m. | 5.1 | 17.9 | |
| 11 | "Live Season Final" | April 20, 2018 | 511 | Friday 9:30 p.m. | 5.5 | 20.5 | |
