= The Voice Kids (Russian TV series) season 7 =

The Voice Kids
- Season 7
- Presented by: Dmitry Nagiev; Agata Muceniece
- Coaches: Basta; Polina Gagarina; Valery Meladze
- Winner: Olesya Kazachenko
- Winning coach: Basta
- Runner-up: Sofia Tumanova

Release
- Original network: Channel One
- Original release: February 14 – April 24, 2020

Season chronology
- ← Previous; Season 6 Next → Season 8

The seventh season of the Russian reality talent show The Voice Kids premiered on February 14, 2020 on Channel One. Dmitry Nagiev returned as the presenter, Agata Muceniece returned after a one-season break and replaced Aglaya Shilovskaya as a co-presenter. Valery Meladze returned as a coach while Basta returned as a coach after a one-season break and replaced Pelageya, Polina Gagarina replaced LOBODA.

Olesya Kazachenko was announced the winner on April 24, 2020, marking Basta's first win as a coach. Also Basta became the first coach on the children's version of the show to be both the Best coach and the winning coach in the same season.

== Coaches and presenters ==
The Voice Kids Season 7 coaches

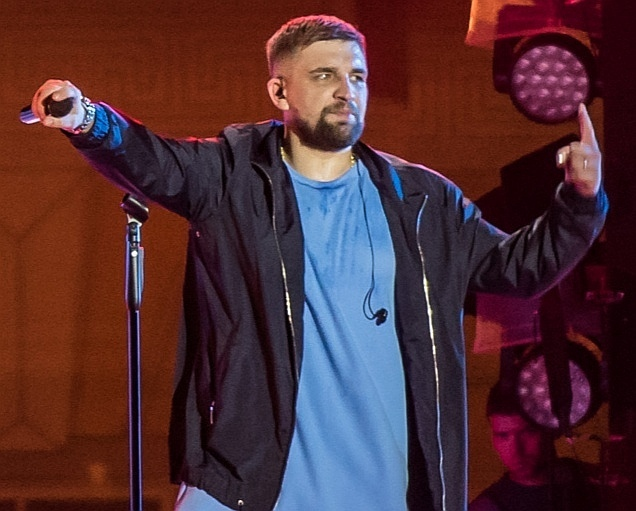
Basta

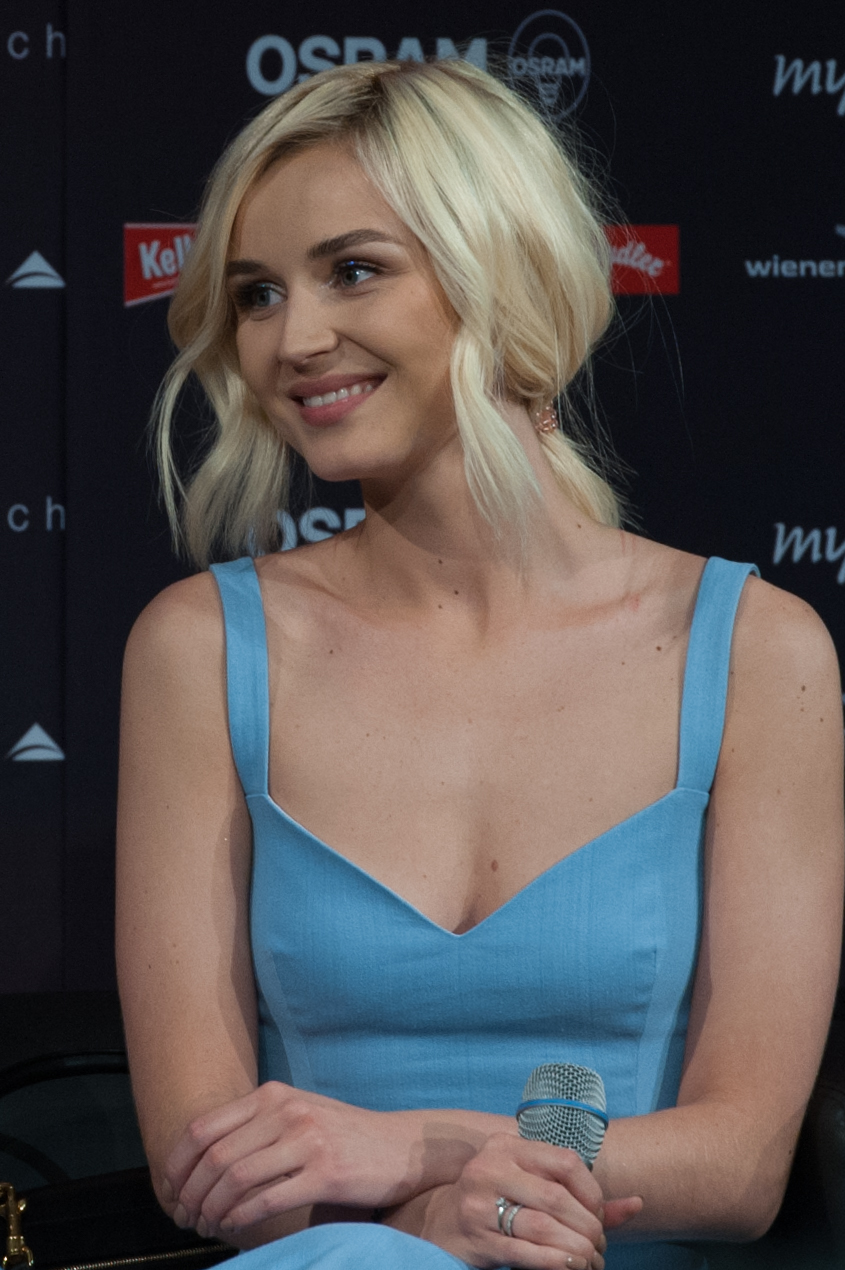
Polina Gagarina

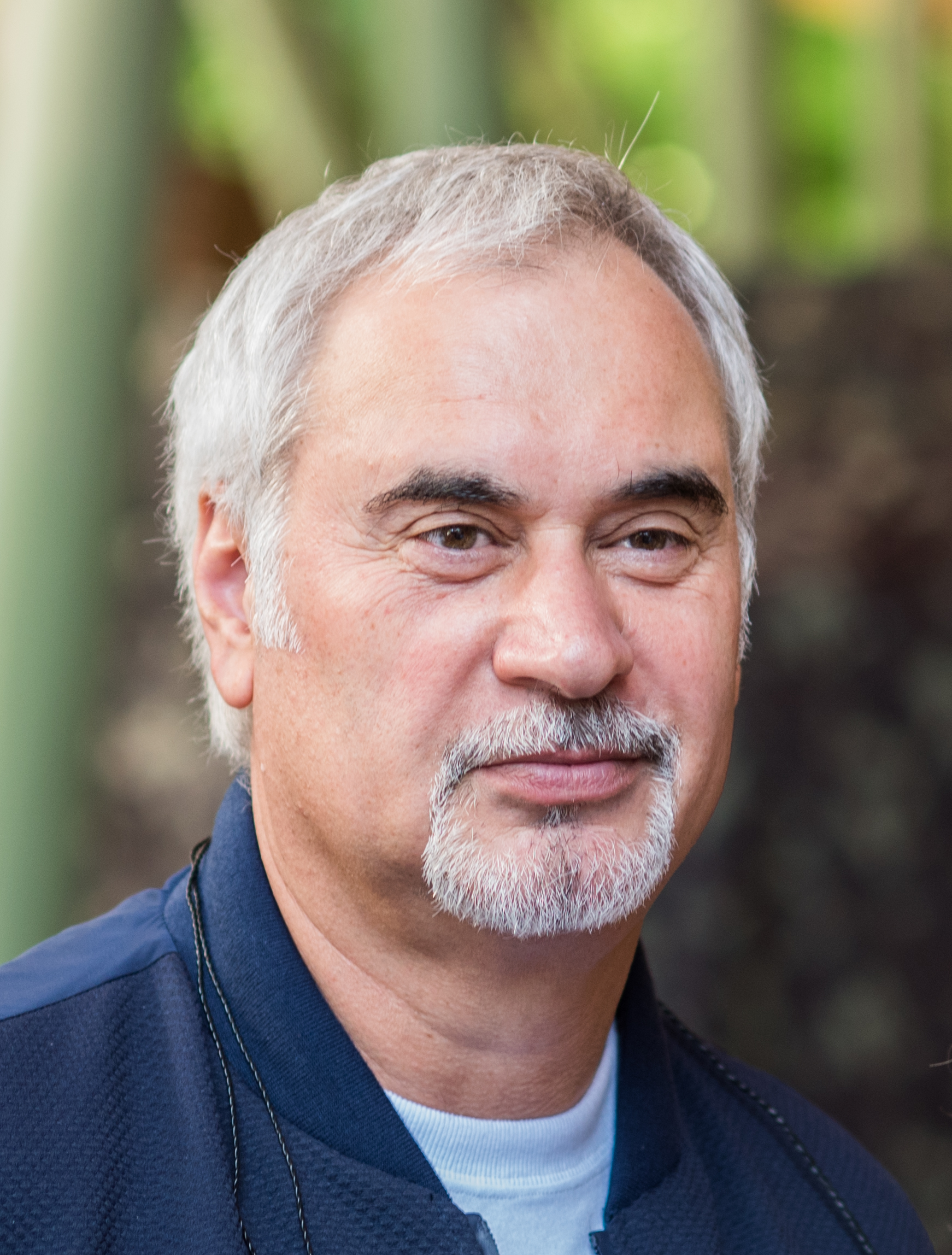
Valery Meladze

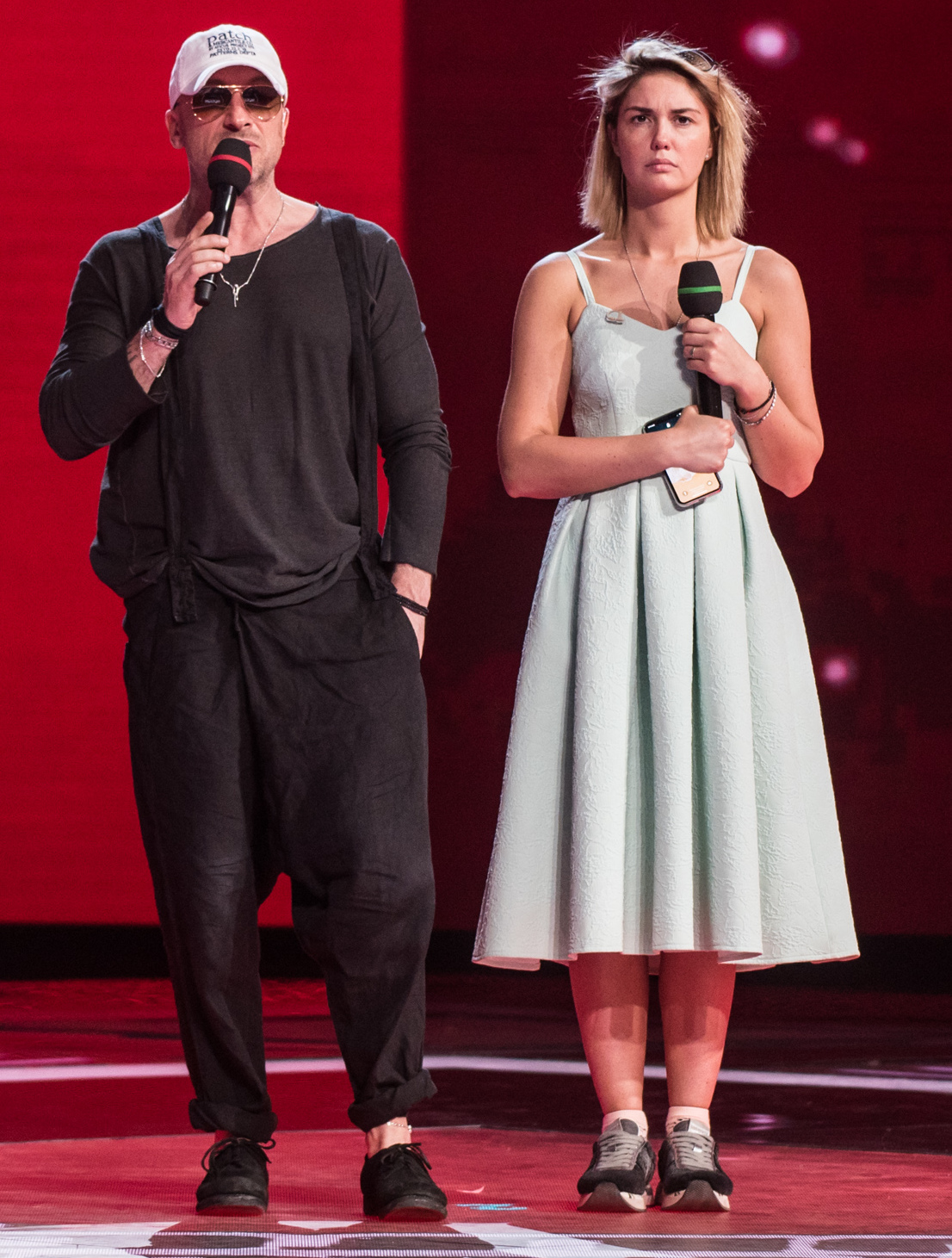
Dmitry Nagiev and Agata Muceniece

Valery Meladze was joined by Polina Gagarina as a new coach and Basta, who returned after a one-season break. Dmitry Nagiev as presenter is joined by Agata Muceniece, who already held this position in the fifth season.

== Teams ==
Colour key

- Winner
- Runner-up
- Third place
- Eliminated in the Final
- Eliminated in the Live Extra round
- Eliminated in the Battle rounds

Coaches	Top 45 artists				
Basta					
Basta	Olesya Kazachenko	Ivan Kurgalin	Sofya Lyoret	Elizaveta Smetannikova	Anna Prokopenko
Basta	Kseniya Shaplyko	Egor Blinov	Darya Kiselova	Alisa Savchits	Alina Shtyrnyaeva
Basta	Valeriya Bazykina & Manizha Aminova	Vladimir Serkov	Zlata Osipova	Maryana Titova	Lyubava Solyanaya
Polina Gagarina					
Polina Gagarina	Artyom Fokin	Artyom Morozov	Mirzhan Zhidebay	Taisiya Skomorokhova	Varvara Glukhova
Polina Gagarina	Gennadiy Pereverdiev	Dmitriy & Sergey Kotsenko	Darya Martsynkevich	Agniya Andreeva	Elina Khan
Polina Gagarina	Matvey Belyaev	Kseniya Misyurina	Ekaterina Kretova	Angelina Deryabina	Milana Volkova
Valery Meladze					
Valery Meladze	Sofya Tumanova	Kirill Aleksandrov	Kristina Siller	Sofiya Fomenko	Sofiya Butamyonok
Valery Meladze	Kira Naumenko	Artyom Skorol	Arina Orlova	Bogdan Khayrullin	Alisa Smirnova
Valery Meladze	Varvara Muzeeva	Timur Lezgishvili	Polina Groznova	Miron Dovgan	Semyon Orlov
Note: Italicized names are stolen contestants (who were eliminated in the Sing-offs, but were stolen in the Live Extra round and advanced to the Final).

== Blind auditions ==
Colour key

✔	Coach pressed "I WANT YOU" button
✔	Coach pressed "I WANT YOU", despite the lack places in his/her team
	Artist defaulted to a coach's team
	Artist picked a coach's team
	Artist eliminated with no coach pressing their button

The coaches performed "О голос" at the start of the show.

Episode	Order	Artist	Age	Hometown	Song	Coach's and artist's choices		
Episode	Order	Artist	Age	Hometown	Song	Basta	Gagarina	Meladze
Episode 1 (Note: Basta is The best coach of episode 1.) (February 14)	1	Miron Dovgan	6	Chelyabinsk	"От Волги до Енисея"	✔	✔	✔
Episode 1 (February 14)	2	Elina Khan	11	Kaluga, Kaluga oblast	"Back in the U.S.S.R."	—	✔	—
Episode 1 (February 14)	3	Elizaveta Smetannikova	10	Novosibirsk	"Экспонат"	✔	✔	✔
Episode 1 (February 14)	4	Zelimkhan Ataev	11	Makhachkala	"Parlami d'amore, Mariu"	—	—	—
Episode 1 (February 14)	5	Milana Volkova	10	Ryazan	"Не пара"	—	✔	✔
Episode 1 (February 14)	6	Taisiya Skomorokhova	8	Odintsovo, Moscow Oblast	"Goomba Boomba"	✔	✔	✔
Episode 1 (February 14)	7	Alexander Pereplyotchikov	13	Orenburg Oblast	"Метелица метёт"	—	—	—
Episode 1 (February 14)	8	Kristina Siller	14	Saint Petersburg	"Strange Birds"	—	—	✔
Episode 1 (February 14)	9	Ivan Kurgalin	13	Veliky Novgorod	"Слишком влюблён"	✔	—	—
Episode 1 (February 14)	10	Anna Bazhanova	12	Podolsk, Moscow Oblast	"Billie Jean"	—	—	—
Episode 1 (February 14)	11	Alisa Savchits	10	Saint Petersburg	"Somewhere"	✔	—	✔
Episode 2 (Note: Basta is The best coach of episode 2.) (February 21)	1	Valeriya Bazykina & Manizha Aminova	13/14	Balashikha, Moscow oblast / Vyoshki, Smolensk oblast	"Трава у дома"	✔	—	✔
Episode 2 (February 21)	2	Artyom Morozov	10	Moscow	"Who Wants to Live Forever"	✔	✔	✔
Episode 2 (February 21)	3	Alisa Smirnova	6	Moscow	"Гармонь моя"	—	—	✔
Episode 2 (February 21)	4	Kirill Aleksandrov	12	Belgorod	"Virtual Insanity"	✔	—	✔
Episode 2 (February 21)	5	Varvara Glukhova	10	Novosibirsk	"Мама, я танцую"	✔	✔	✔
Episode 2 (February 21)	6	Ivan Azarenko	12	Novosibirsk	"О любви"	—	—	—
Episode 2 (February 21)	7	Angelina Deryabina	9	Moscow	"Part of Your World"	✔	✔	✔
Episode 2 (February 21)	8	Darya Martsynkevich	12	Minsk, Belarus	"Break Free"	—	✔	—
Episode 2 (February 21)	9	Nicole Podteroba	13	Moscow	"Кажется"	—	—	—
Episode 2 (February 21)	10	Artyom Skorol	14	Ashmyany, Belarus	"Feeling Good"	—	—	✔
Episode 3 (Note: Basta is The best coach of episode 3.) (February 28)	1	Agniya Andreeva	6	Moscow	"I Got You (I Feel Good)"	✔	✔	✔
Episode 3 (February 28)	2	Maksim Putin	12	Moscow	"Confessa"	—	—	—
Episode 3 (February 28)	3	Tais Saka	14	Antalya, Turkey	"Ой, то не вечер"	—	—	—
Episode 3 (February 28)	4	Vladimir Serkov	9	Buturlinovka, Voronezh Oblast	"Скрипка Паганини"	✔	✔	✔
Episode 3 (February 28)	5	Agata Gorbachyova	11	Moscow	"Give It Away"	—	—	—
Episode 3 (February 28)	6	Semyon Orlov	7	Moscow	"Симона"	—	—	✔
Episode 3 (February 28)	7	Sofya Lyoret	13	Moscow	"Clown"	✔	✔	✔
Episode 3 (February 28)	8	Sofiya Nurieva	10	Saint Petersburg	"Moon River"	—	—	—
Episode 3 (February 28)	9	Varvara Muzeeva	12	Moscow	"Всё не так просто"	—	—	✔
Episode 3 (February 28)	10	Mirzhan Zhidebay	14	Aktobe, Kazakhstan	"Listen"	✔	✔	—
Episode 3 (February 28)	11	Zlata Osipova	9	Moscow	"Enjoy the Silence"	✔	—	✔
Episode 4 (Note: Basta is The best coach of episode 4.) (March 6)	1	Ekaterina Kretova	13	Barabinsk, Novosibirsk Oblast	"Я на горку шла"	—	✔	—
Episode 4 (March 6)	2	Artyom Fokin	13	Sevastopol, Ukraine	"Taki Rari"	✔	✔	✔
Episode 4 (March 6)	3	Lyubava Solyanaya	6	Saint Petersburg	"Любочка"	✔	—	—
Episode 4 (March 6)	4	Alim Fazailov	12	Moscow	"Gangsta's Paradise"	—	—	—
Episode 4 (March 6)	5	Maryana Titova	9	Saint Petersburg	"Падать в грязь"	✔	—	✔
Episode 4 (March 6)	6	Elis Brener	12	Ashdod, Israel	"Dynamite"	—	—	—
Episode 4 (March 6)	7	Bogdan Khayrullin	11	Chelyabinsk	"Белый снег"	✔	✔	✔
Episode 4 (March 6)	8	Aruzhan Sabykenova	14	Almaty, Kazakhstan	"Don't You Worry 'bout a Thing"	—	—	—
Episode 4 (March 6)	9	Nikita Moroz	13	Moscow	"Комета"	—	—	—
Episode 4 (March 6)	10	Anna Prokopenko	14	Kaluga	"Nature Boy"	✔	—	✔
Episode 4 (March 6)	11	Kira Naumenko	10	Aprelevka, Moscow Oblast	"Танцующие Эвридики"	—	—	✔
Episode 5 (Note: Basta is The best coach of episode 5.) (March 13)	1	Kseniya Shaplyko	6	Minsk, Belarus	"Районы, кварталы"	✔	—	✔
Episode 5 (March 13)	2	Diyarbek Nurullaev	11	Tashkent, Uzbekistan	"Pardonne moi"	—	—	—
Episode 5 (March 13)	3	Polina Groznova	14	Tver	"Mein Vater ist ein Appenzeller"	—	—	✔
Episode 5 (March 13)	4	Egor Blinov	14	Saratov	"Твои следы"	✔	—	—
Episode 5 (March 13)	5	Olesya Kazachenko	10	Noginsk, Moscow Oblast	"Rise Up"	✔	✔	✔
Episode 5 (March 13)	6	Sofiya Butamyonok	6	Mogilev, Belarus	"Дорогой длинною"	—	—	✔
Episode 5 (March 13)	7	Darya Saphronova	13	Leninsk-Kuznetsky, Kemerovo Oblast	"Ты уйдёшь"	—	—	—
Episode 5 (March 13)	8	Timur Lezgishvili	13	Toronto, Canada	"We Are the Champions"	✔	✔	✔
Episode 5 (March 13)	9	Sofya Tumanova	12	Novosibirsk	"My Mind"	✔	✔	✔
Episode 5 (March 13)	10	Mariya Ermakova	12	Minsk, Belarus	"Если ты слышишь"	—	—	—
Episode 5 (March 13)	11	Dmitriy & Sergey Kotsenko	12	Vladivostok	"Красный конь"	—	✔	—
Episode 6 (Note: Basta is The best coach of episode 6.) (March 20)	1	Matvey Belyaev	8	Cherepovets, Vologda Oblast	"Ночной хулиган"	—	✔	✔
Episode 6 (March 20)	2	Sofiya Fomenko	10	Vyborg, Leningrad Oblast	"Girls Just Want to Have Fun"	—	—	✔
Episode 6 (March 20)	3	Arina Orlova	14	Moscow	"Idontwannabeyouanymore"	✔	✔	✔
Episode 6 (March 20)	4	Gennadiy Pereverdiev	11	Moscow	"Натуральный блондин"	—	✔	Team full
Episode 6 (March 20)	5	Mariel Shavit	10	Holon, Israel	"Летний дождь"	—	—	Team full
Episode 6 (March 20)	6	Kseniya Misyurina	10	Chelyabinsk	"Я выбираю тебя"	✔	✔	Team full
Episode 6 (March 20)	7	Matvey Gilov	11	Ishim, Tyumen Oblast	"Штиль"	—	Team full	Team full
Episode 6 (March 20)	8	Evelina Zelinka	14	Krasnoyarsk	"Чак"	—	Team full	Team full
Episode 6 (March 20)	9	Darya Kiselova	10	Moscow	"Toy"	✔	Team full	Team full
Episode 6 (March 20)	10	Alina Shtyrnyaeva	14	Zarechny, Penza Oblast	"One Day"	✔	✔	✔

== The Battles ==
The Battles began on March 27, 2020. Contestants who won their battle advanced to the Sing-off rounds.

Colour key

Artist won the Battle and advanced to the Sing-offs
Artist was eliminated

Episode	Coach	Order	Winner	Song	Losers	
Episode 7 (March 27)	Valery Meladze	1	Sofiya Butamyonok	"Влюблённый и безумно одинокий"	Alisa Smirnova	Semyon Orlov
Episode 7 (March 27)	Valery Meladze	2	Sofiya Fomenko	"Песенка мамонтёнка" / "Life"	Miron Dovgan	Bogdan Khayrullin
Episode 7 (March 27)	Valery Meladze	3	Kirill Aleksandrov	"Everybody"	Artyom Skorol	Timur Lezgishvili
Episode 7 (March 27)	Valery Meladze	4	Sofya Tumanova	"Одно и то же"	Varvara Muzeeva	Kira Naumenko
Episode 7 (March 27)	Valery Meladze	5	Kristina Siller	"F-R-I-E-N-D-S"	Polina Groznova	Arina Orlova
Episode 8 (April 3)	Polina Gagarina	1	Artyom Morozov	"The Final Countdown"	Dmitriy & Sergey Kotsenko	Kseniya Misyurina
Episode 8 (April 3)	Polina Gagarina	2	Mirzhan Zhidebay	"Замок из дождя"	Darya Martsynkevich	Ekaterina Kretova
Episode 8 (April 3)	Polina Gagarina	3	Varvara Glukhova	"Были танцы" / "Пойду, выйду на улицу"	Elina Khan	Milana Volkova
Episode 8 (April 3)	Polina Gagarina	4	Artyom Fokin	"Небо"	Matvey Belyaev	Gennadiy Pereverdiev
Episode 8 (April 3)	Polina Gagarina	5	Taisiya Skomorokhova	"Dance Monkey"	Angelina Deryabina	Agniya Andreeva
Episode 9 (April 10)	Basta	1	Elizaveta Smetannikova	"Убей мою подругу"	Alisa Savchits	Maryana Titova
Episode 9 (April 10)	Basta	2	Anna Prokopenko	"Тучи"	Alina Shtyrnyaeva	Lyubava Solyanaya
Episode 9 (April 10)	Basta	3	Sofya Lyoret	"Good as Hell"	Zlata Osipova	Darya Kiselova
Episode 9 (April 10)	Basta	4	Ivan Kurgalin	"Фантазёр"	Egor Blinov	Vladimir Serkov
Episode 9 (April 10)	Basta	5	Olesya Kazachenko	"Toccata and Fugue" / "Eye of the Tiger"	Kseniya Shaplyko	Valeriya Bazykina & Manizha Aminova

== The Sing-offs ==
The Sing-offs start on March 27. Contestants who were saved by their coaches advanced to the Final.

Colour key

Artist was saved by his/her coach and advanced to the Final
Artist was eliminated but received the Comeback and advanced to the Live Extra round

Episode	Coach	Order	Artist	Song	Result
Episode 7 (March 27)	Valery Meladze	1	Sofiya Butamyonok	"Дорогой длинною"	Advanced to the Live Extra round
Episode 7 (March 27)	Valery Meladze	2	Sofiya Fomenko	"Girls Just Want to Have Fun"	Advanced to the Live Extra round
Episode 7 (March 27)	Valery Meladze	3	Kirill Aleksandrov	"Virtual Insanity"	Advanced to the Live Extra round
Episode 7 (March 27)	Valery Meladze	4	Sofya Tumanova	"My Mind"	Advanced to the Final
Episode 7 (March 27)	Valery Meladze	5	Kristina Siller	"Strange Birds"	Advanced to the Final
Episode 8 (April 3)	Polina Gagarina	1	Artyom Morozov	"Who Wants to Live Forever"	Advanced to the Final
Episode 8 (April 3)	Polina Gagarina	2	Mirzhan Zhidebay	"Listen"	Advanced to the Final
Episode 8 (April 3)	Polina Gagarina	3	Varvara Glukhova	"Мама, я танцую"	Advanced to the Live Extra round
Episode 8 (April 3)	Polina Gagarina	4	Artyom Fokin	"Taki Rari"	Advanced to the Live Extra round
Episode 8 (April 3)	Polina Gagarina	5	Taisiya Skomorokhova	"Goomba Boomba"	Advanced to the Live Extra round
Episode 9 (April 10)	Basta	1	Elizaveta Smetannikova	"Экспонат"	Advanced to the Live Extra round
Episode 9 (April 10)	Basta	2	Anna Prokopenko	"Nature Boy"	Advanced to the Live Extra round
Episode 9 (April 10)	Basta	3	Sofya Lyoret	"Clown"	Advanced to the Final
Episode 9 (April 10)	Basta	4	Ivan Kurgalin	"Слишком влюблён"	Advanced to the Live Extra round
Episode 9 (April 10)	Basta	5	Olesya Kazachenko	"Rise Up"	Advanced to the Final

== Live shows ==
Colour key

Artist was saved by the public's votes
Artist was eliminated

=== Week 1: Live Playoffs (April 17) ===
As with season 2, each coach saved three artists who were eliminated in the Sing-offs. Playoff results were voted on in real time. Nine artists sang live and six of them were eliminated by the end of the night. Three saved artists advanced to the Final.

The show was live with no audience due to the 2019–20 coronavirus pandemic.

Episode	Coach	Order	Artist	Song	Public's vote	Result
Episode 10 (April 17) (Note: Polina Gagarina is The best coach of episode 10.)	Valery Meladze	1	Sofiya Butamyonok	"Частушки Бабок-Ёжек"	13.4%	Eliminated
Episode 10 (April 17)	Valery Meladze	2	Kirill Aleksandrov	"Cake by the Ocean"	57.7%	Advanced
Episode 10 (April 17)	Valery Meladze	3	Sofiya Fomenko	"Паруса"	26.9%	Eliminated
Episode 10 (April 17)	Polina Gagarina	4	Taisiya Skomorokhova	"Голоса"	24.9%	Eliminated
Episode 10 (April 17)	Polina Gagarina	5	Artyom Fokin	"Опера №2"	54.1%	Advanced
Episode 10 (April 17)	Polina Gagarina	6	Varvara Glukhova	"Шагай"	21%	Eliminated
Episode 10 (April 17)	Basta	7	Elizaveta Smetannikova	"Вновь за горизонт"	20.8%	Eliminated
Episode 10 (April 17)	Basta	8	Anna Prokopenko	"Только с тобой"	18.6%	Eliminated
Episode 10 (April 17)	Basta	9	Ivan Kurgalin	"На берегу неба"	60.6%	Advanced

=== Week 2: Final (April 24) ===
Episode	Coach	Order	Artist	Song	Public's vote	Result
Episode 11 (April 24)
Episode 11 (April 24)	Final					
Episode 11 (April 24)	Valery Meladze	1	Kristina Siller	"California Dreamin'"	4.9%	Eliminated
Episode 11 (April 24)	Valery Meladze	2	Kirill Aleksandrov	"Разговор со счастьем"	28.1%	Eliminated
Episode 11 (April 24)	Valery Meladze	3	Sofya Tumanova	"Птиченька"	67%	Advanced
Episode 11 (April 24)	Polina Gagarina	4	Artyom Morozov	"Зурбаган"	24.3%	Eliminated
Episode 11 (April 24)	Polina Gagarina	5	Mirzhan Zhidebay	"I Surrender"	22.1%	Eliminated
Episode 11 (April 24)	Polina Gagarina	6	Artyom Fokin	"Третья песня Леля"	53.6%	Advanced
Episode 11 (April 24)	Basta	7	Sofya Lyoret	"Любовь настала"	18.3%	Eliminated
Episode 11 (April 24)	Basta	8	Ivan Kurgalin	"Чёрное солнце"	29.4%	Eliminated
Episode 11 (April 24)	Basta	9	Olesya Kazachenko	"Total Eclipse of the Heart"	52.3%	Advanced
Episode 11 (April 24)	Super Final					
Episode 11 (April 24)	Valery Meladze	1	Sofya Tumanova	"Стороною дождь" / "Колыбельная"	32.7%	Runner-up
Episode 11 (April 24)	Polina Gagarina	2	Artyom Fokin	"Con te partirò"	31.6%	Third place
Episode 11 (April 24)	Basta	3	Olesya Kazachenko	"Миллион алых роз"	35.7%	Winner

Non-competition performances
Performer	Song
The Top 9 artists	"The Winner Takes It All"

== Best Coach ==
Colour key

- Best Coach
- Second place
- Third place
- Episode's Best Coach

Coach	Public's vote _{(per episode)}								Result
Coach	#1	#2	#3	#4	#5	#6	#10	Av.	Result
Basta	40%	36%	36%	42%	45%	40%	38%	40%	Best Coach
Polina Gagarina	31%	33%	31%	36%	28%	32%	42%	33%	Second place
Valery Meladze	29%	31%	33%	22%	27%	28%	20%	27%	Third place

== Reception ==
=== Rating ===
Episode		Original airdate	Production	Time slot (UTC+3)	Viewers (by million)	Audience		Source
Episode		Original airdate	Production	Time slot (UTC+3)	Viewers (by million)	Rating	Share	Source
1	"The Blind Auditions Premiere"	February 14, 2020	701	Friday 9:30 p.m.	3.78	5.3	19.2	
2	"The Blind Auditions, Part 2"	February 21, 2020	702	Friday 9:30 p.m.	3.9	5.5	20.9	
3	"The Blind Auditions, Part 3"	February 28, 2020	703	Friday 9:30 p.m.	4.0	5.7	20.3	
4	"The Blind Auditions, Part 4"	March 6, 2020	704	Friday 9:30 p.m.	3.67	5.2	18.4	
5	"The Blind Auditions, Part 5"	March 13, 2020	705	Friday 9:30 p.m.	4.1	5.8	19.8	
6	"The Blinds End"	March 20, 2020	706	Friday 9:30 p.m.	4.07	5.8	19.3	
7	"The Battles and the Sing-offs Premiere"	March 27, 2020	707	Friday 9:30 p.m.	4.1	5.8	22.1	
8	"The Battles and the Sing-offs, Part 2"	April 3, 2020	708	Friday 9:30 p.m.	3.94	5.6	19.5	
9	"The Battles and the Sing-offs, Part 3"	April 10, 2020	709	Friday 9:30 p.m.	3.63	5.1	18.4	
10	"Live Playoffs"	April 17, 2020	710	Friday 9:30 p.m.	3.58	5.1	17.2	
11	"Live Season Final"	April 24, 2020	711	Friday 9:30 p.m.	3.48	4.9	18.5	
