= Dialog (band) =

- Dialog in 1985; From top left, clockwise: Deynega, Vasilchenko, Litvinenko (and friend), Breitburg, Radiyevsky

Background information
- Origin: Mykolaiv/Donetsk
- Genres: Progressive rock, pop rock
- Years active: 1978–1991
- Labels: Melodiya, Monolith Records

Dialog (Ukrainian: Диалог, Russian: Диалог) was a Soviet rock group formed in 1978 in Nikolaev by singer, composer, arranger, keyboardist and songwriter Kim Breitburg. The band played progressive/art rock with elements of new wave, synthpop and reggae, often setting their music to poems written by well-known Soviet poets, like Arseny Tarkovsky, Semyon Kirsanov, Yuri Levitansky and Justinas Marcinkevičius. Dialog's live appearances featured impressive light and laser show, unique for the Soviet pop and rock scene. The first Soviet rock band to tour Europe, they performed at the 1987 MIDEM festival, representing the Soviet recording industry. Dialog disbanded in 1991. Briefly (in 1992–1993) Breitburg used the moniker Gruppa Dialog for a totally different band which he formed with brothers Konstantin and Valery Meladze.

== Band history ==
The band's history goes back to 1969 when Kim Breitburg (vocals, keyboards, guitar), Viktor Bezugly (bass, vocal), Viktor Litvinenko (guitar) and Anatoly Deynega (drums) formed in Mykolaiv (then a city in the USSR, now in Ukraine) the pop band Kodry (Кодры), which soon became one of the most popular in the city. It disbanded, as most of its members got drafted. Breitburg's next project Baikonur in 1975 signed with the Jezkazgan Philharmonics. A year later they returned home, now as Gaudeamus, with Breitburg and his new line-up starting to explore the possibilities of the quasi-classical musical format, with the 30-minute art rock suite Zemlya Lyudei, Land of Humans. The elements of musical theatre were now featured in the band's stage shows, as well as first experiments with visual arts. Next year the band moved to the Novosibirsk Philharmonics where it was renamed into Gulliver. In 1977 they returned to Mykolaiv, the line-up now featuring guitarists Viktor Litvinenko and Mikhail Pirogov, Viktor Radiyevsky (bass, vocals), Sergey Vasilchenko (keyboards, vocals), Anna Salmina (violin, vocals), Sergey Babkov (drums), as well as the brass section.

In 1978 they became the laureates of the Second All-Union Competition of Pop Artists held in Zaporizhia, performing there under the moniker Poyushchiye yungi (Singing Shipboys). Later that year they changed the name for the last time and, as Dialog, signed to the Donetsk Philharmonics. Being encouraged here in their experiments, they came up with the musical spectacle Slovo ob Igorevom pokhode (based on the 12th century Russian folklore epic Tale of Igor's Campaign) to be produced and performed in different Soviet cities in the course of the tour that followed. That same year drummer Anatoly Deynega returned to the band.

In March 1980 Dialog took part in the Tbilisi Spring Rhythms Festival. They performed the art rock suite Pod Odnim Nebom (Under the Common Sky) based on the poem by Semyon Kirsanov and were awarded the 3rd prize, Breitburg winning in the Best vocalist category. Dialog went on to perform at the Sochi Song Festival and by the end of 1980 had dropped the brass section. Pirogov also quit, replaced by singer Vladimir Larchenko.

In 1981 Dialog moved to the Kemerovo Philharmonics and staged there another Breitburg's magum opus, the prog rock suite Ya Chelovek (I Am Human) based on the poem by the Lithuanian poet Justinas Marcinkevičius. The band embarked upon another tour, impressively produced concerts now divided into two parts, the first presenting the suite, the second a more pop/rock-oriented set, both backed by the unique (for the Soviet standards, anyway) light and laser show. The mainstream Soviet press ignored them but specialists praised Dialog's delicate treatment of 'serious' poetry by Kirsanov, Marcinkevičius, Arseny Tarkovsky, Vadim Shefner and Yuri Levitansky, processed through artful arrangements, following the route set in the early 1970s by bands like Genesis and Yes.

In 1982 Larchenko left, to be replaced by Nikolai Shevchenko (keyboards, vocals) from the Simferopol band Interview, and guitarist Yuri Nikiforov. In 1984 the group produced on stage art rock suite Razdeli so mnoi (Share With Me), after another poem by Marcinkevičius. Next, in 1986 came Odnazhdy zavtra (Sometimes Tomorrow), the prog rock take on Semyon Kirsanov's poem of the same name. The 1983 compilation Kvadratny chelovek (Square Man) was released originally on tape and became popular with the audiences of the Soviet discotheques and youth clubs. The band debuted officially on vinyl with Prosto (Simple, 1985, Melodia), followed by Detective (1986). In December 1986 Dialog performed at the Rock-Panorama event in Moscow. In the early 1987 they went to France to represent the Soviet recording industry at the MIDEM in Cannes and had considerable success.

Over the next four years Dialog, touring continuously, performed in 23 countries, including Great Britain, where, alongside Avtograf they gave what the Thames TV called the 'historic performance' at the Capital Radio festival in the Hammersmith Odeon, this being 'the first time that the musicians from the Soviet Union have ever played at the UK.' "It took Capital Radio three years and five visits to get permission for the two groups to come over and take part in [the 1987] music festival," according to reporter Tricia Ingrams. In London they enjoyed warm reception and appreciative, friendly atmosphere. "I instantly felt at home," the singer later wrote in his autobiography, mentioning the friendships they made, notably with Steve Hackett whom a year later they invited to perform at the 1988 Tallinn Rock festival.

On return to the USSR they found things changed. The 'new wave' of lip-synching pop bands took over the concert scene to make the 'serious' rock ensembles looking old-fashioned and irrelevant. Vasilchenko, Nikiforov and Shevschenko left to be replaced by guitarist Toomas Vanem and keyboardist Andrey Dolgikh, both from Tallinn's Radar. Dialog's music became heavier, but the Dialog-3 (1988) album recorded by this line-up received mixed reviews and was ignored by the public. Soon after the 1991 release of Poseredine mira (Посередине мира, At the Center of the World, a suite written by Konstantin Meladze and Breitburg and based on Arseny Tarkovsky's poetry) Dialog disbanded.

=== Post break-up ===
Kim Breitburg joined forces with Valery Meladze (whom he knew from the band's Mykolaiv days), first in Gruppa Dialog (1992–1993), then in Mistiquana (1995–1996), both having Meladze as a frontman and featuring Viktor Litvinenko. In the 1990s Breitburg wrote numerous hits for established pop stars like Filipp Kirkorov and composed several acclaimed suites and musicals. In the 2000s he became a successful musical entrepreneur.

Dialog band in early 1990s became a base for the newly created Dialog project aimed at searching new talents in music. Kim Breitburg together with Evgeniy Fridland and Vadim Botnaruk developed a system for promoting new musicians on radio and later on the Internet. The system later become known as TopHit project.

In 2004 all six Dialog albums were re-issued by Monolith Records. In 2009 Breitburg, Litvinenko, Deynega and Radiyevsky came together for the first time in some 20 years to perform the song "Night Rain" on the Russian TV. In 2010, in Vitebsk, responding to the question about the possible Dialog reunion, Breitburg said: "Some of the former band members suffer from poor health, so no, this is not in our plans." The band's drummer Anatoly Deynega died on 14 August 2014.

== Select discography ==
=== Albums ===
- Prosto (Просто, Simply, 1985)
- Detektiv (Детектив, 1986)
- Dialog – 3 (Диалог – 3, 1988)
- Poseredine mira (Посередине мира, At the Center of the World, 1991, suite)
- Osenny krik yastreba (Осенний крик ястреба, The Autumn Cry of Hawk, 1993, as Gruppa Dialog)
- Ne Ukhodi moi angel (Не уходи мой ангел, Don't Go Away, My Angel, 1995, as Gruppa Dialog)

=== Compilations ===
- I Put The Spell on the Fire (1989, I Am Human/Share With Me compilation)
- Nochnoi dozhd (Ночной дождь, 1990)
- The best – 1983–1985 (1994)
- Monolith Records Anthology: 1982/1983, 1984, 1985/1986, Odnazhdy zavtra (2CDs), 1987/1989 (2004)

=== Tapes ===
- Pod Odnim Nebom (Под одним небом, Under the Common Sky, 1981, suite)
- Ya Chelovek (Я – человек, I Am Human, 1982, suite)
- Kvadratny chelovek (Квадратный человек, Square Man, 1983)
- Razdeli so mnoi (Раздели со мной, Share With Me, 1984, suite)
- Rasskazy I skazki (Рассказы и сказки, Tales and Fairytales, 1985)
