= Agatha Dranga =

Latvian model and actress (born 1989)

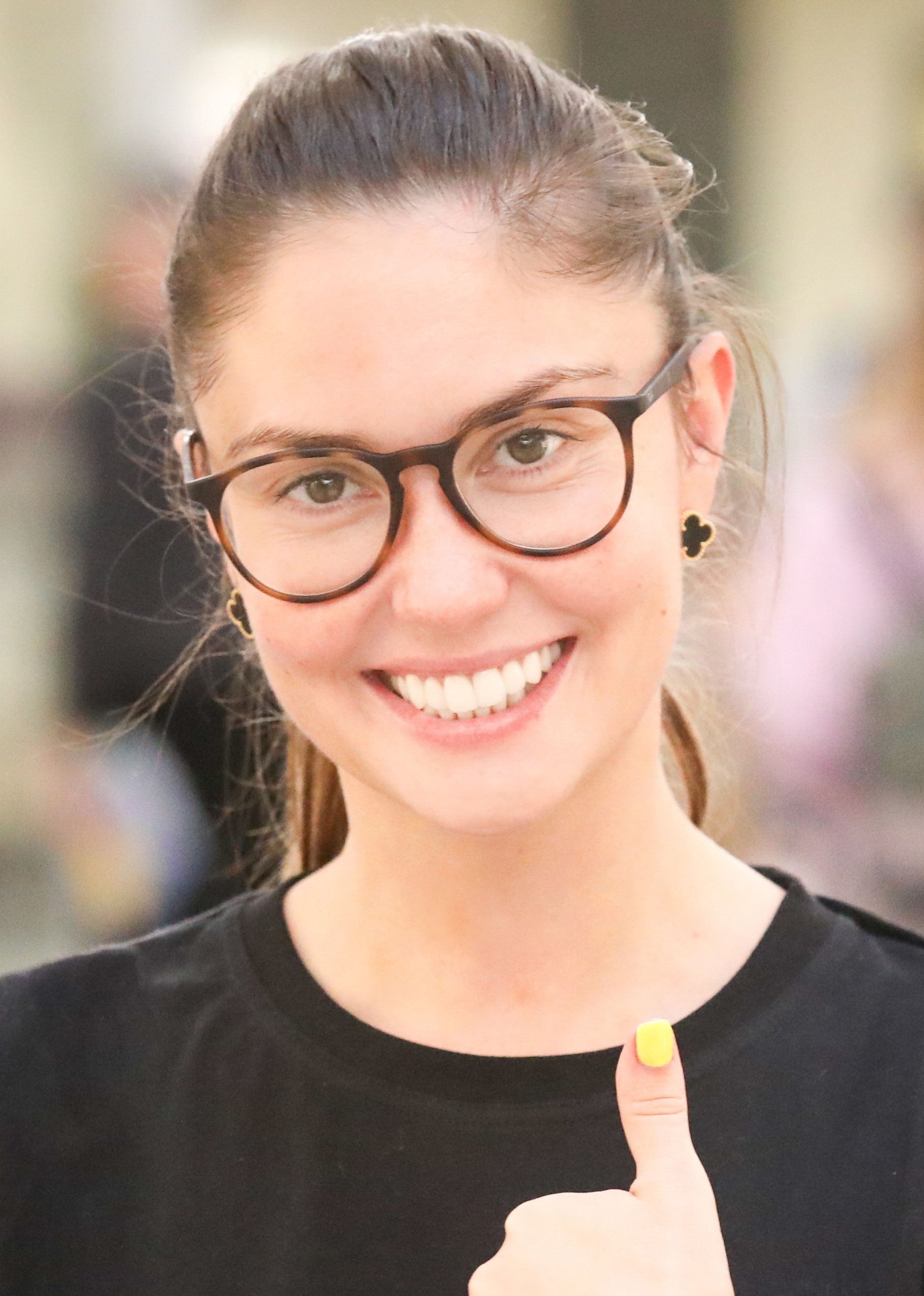
- Born: 1 March 1989 (age 37); Riga, Latvia
- Occupations: Actress, TV host
- Spouse: Pavel Priluchny (m. 2011; div. 2020) Pyotr Dranga (m. 2025)
- Children: 2

Agata Edgarovna Dranga (Priluchnaya) (Latvian: Agate Muceniece, Russian: Ага́та Эдга́ровна Дранга (Прилу́чная), born 1 March 1989) is a Latvian actress, model, and television presenter.

== Life and career ==
Muceniece was born in Riga, Latvia in 1989. Her father was Latvian, her mother is Russian (both born in USSR). She has two older sisters Renata and Santa. Muceniece studied at the University of Latvia where she gained degree in Chinese philology. She then studied at the Russian State Film Institute in Moscow, Russia. She first gained fame in the television series "Closed School" (Russian: Закрытая Школа). She has also featured in projects such as "Secret City", "Kvest", "Three Musketeers".

Muceniece became a co-presenter of the Russian TV show, The Voice Kids in its fifth season, seventh season, eighth season, ninth season, tenth season.

== Personal life ==
Muceniece married Russian actor Pavel Priluchny on 19 July 2011. They have a son Timofey (born 2013), and a daughter Mia (born 2016), in Moscow, Russia.

On 15 June 2020, the couple divorced after nine years of marriage.

She has kept her ex-husband's last name Priluchnaya in official documents, however, her stage name is Muceniece.

On 25 August 2025, Muceniece married Russian accordionist Pyotr Dranga taking his last name. Two months prior, on 23 June 2025, the couple announced they were expecting their first child together.

In February 2022, she publicly denounced the Russian invasion of Ukraine.
