= Pyotr Dranga =

Russian musician & singer

- Also known as: Peter Dranga
- Origin: Moscow, Russia
- Genres: Electronic, Classical, World
- Instruments: Accordion, Vocals, Piano
- Years active: 2008-present

Pyotr Yurievich Dranga (Russian: Пётр Ю́рьевич Дра́нга, Moscow), also known as Peter Dranga, is a Russian accordionist, singer and composer based in Los Angeles, CA.

Dranga's father, Yuir Petrovich Dranga, is a classical accordion player and introduced the instrument to Pyotr at a young age. Dranga was the first to incorporate the accordion in electronic music, which he brought to the Russian and world stages.

== Life and career ==
Dranga was born in 1984 in a family of musicians. His father, Yuri Petrovich Dranga – is a professor at Gnessin Academy of Music Art in Russia, People's Artist of Russia; his mother- Elena Kirillovna Dranga.

In 1999 he was named Laureate at the VII Moscow Open Music Competition and began his concert career organized by Russian Cultural Foundation.

In 2008, he presented his first CD. Pyotr prefers to play on the instruments of the Italian brand Bugari Armando.As of May 2022, Dranga has 11 releases on Spotify.

== Discography ==
Title	Type	Year	Role(s)
Metamorposis	EP	2019	Main Artist, Producer, Songwriter
Any Woman	Single	2019	Main Artist, Producer, Songwriter
Perspective	Album	2020	Main Artist, Producer, Songwriter
Stepping Into	Single	2020	Main Artist, Producer, Songwriter
You Will Never Be Gone	Single	2020	Main Artist, Producer, Songwriter
Don't Stay Down	Single	2020	Main Artist, Producer, Songwriter
What I Do	Single	2020	Main Artist, Producer, Songwriter
Today	Single	2022	Main Artist, Producer, Songwriter
Malibu	Single	2022	Main Artist, Producer, Songwriter
Joshua Tree Experience	Single	2022	Main Artist, Producer, Songwriter
Beat & Jumps	Album	2022	Main Artist, Producer, Songwriter
