= Yangatau =

Yangantau Янгантау
- Selo
- Location within Bashkortostan Location within Russia
- Coordinates: 55°18′N 58°08′E
- Country: Russia
- Region: Bashkortostan
- District: Salavatsky District
- Time zone: UTC+5:00

Yangantau (Russian: Янгантау; Bashkir: Янғантау, Yanğantaw) is a rural locality (a selo) and the administrative centre of Yangantausky Selsoviet, Salavatsky District, Bashkortostan, Russia. The population was 1,017 as of 2010. There are 4 streets.

== Geography ==
Yangatau is located 17 km north of Maloyaz (the district's administrative centre) by road. Chulpan is the nearest rural locality.
