= Kim Breitburg =

Russian composer

Kim Breitburg Ким Брейтбург
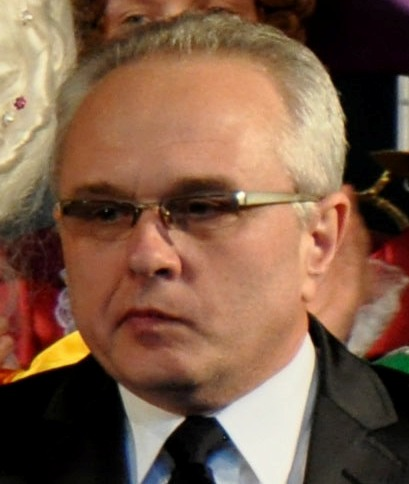
- Breitburg in 2013
- Born: Kim Alexandrovich Breitburg; 10 February 1955 (age 71); Lviv, Ukrainian SSR, USSR
- Occupations: singer, songwriter, composer, producer, entrepreneur
- Years active: 1978–present
- Website: breitburg.ru

Kim Alexandrovich Breitburg (Russian: Ким Александрович Брейтбург, 10 February 1955, Lvov, Ukrainian SSR, USSR) is a Russian composer, singer, keyboardist, author of more than 600 songs, 5 art rock suites and 7 musicals. Breitburg, who first came to prominence as a founder and frontman of the Soviet progressive rock band Dialog (1978–1991) in the later years became a successful mainstream entrepreneur; among his best known projects are the popular reality talent shows "People's Artist", "The Secret of Success" and "The Battle of Choirs".

Members of Dialog band in the 1990s organized the Dialog project aimed at searching for young talent in music. In creation of this project, Kim Breitburg was assisted by his colleagues Evgeniy Fridland and Vadim Botnaruk.
