= Yuri Levitansky =

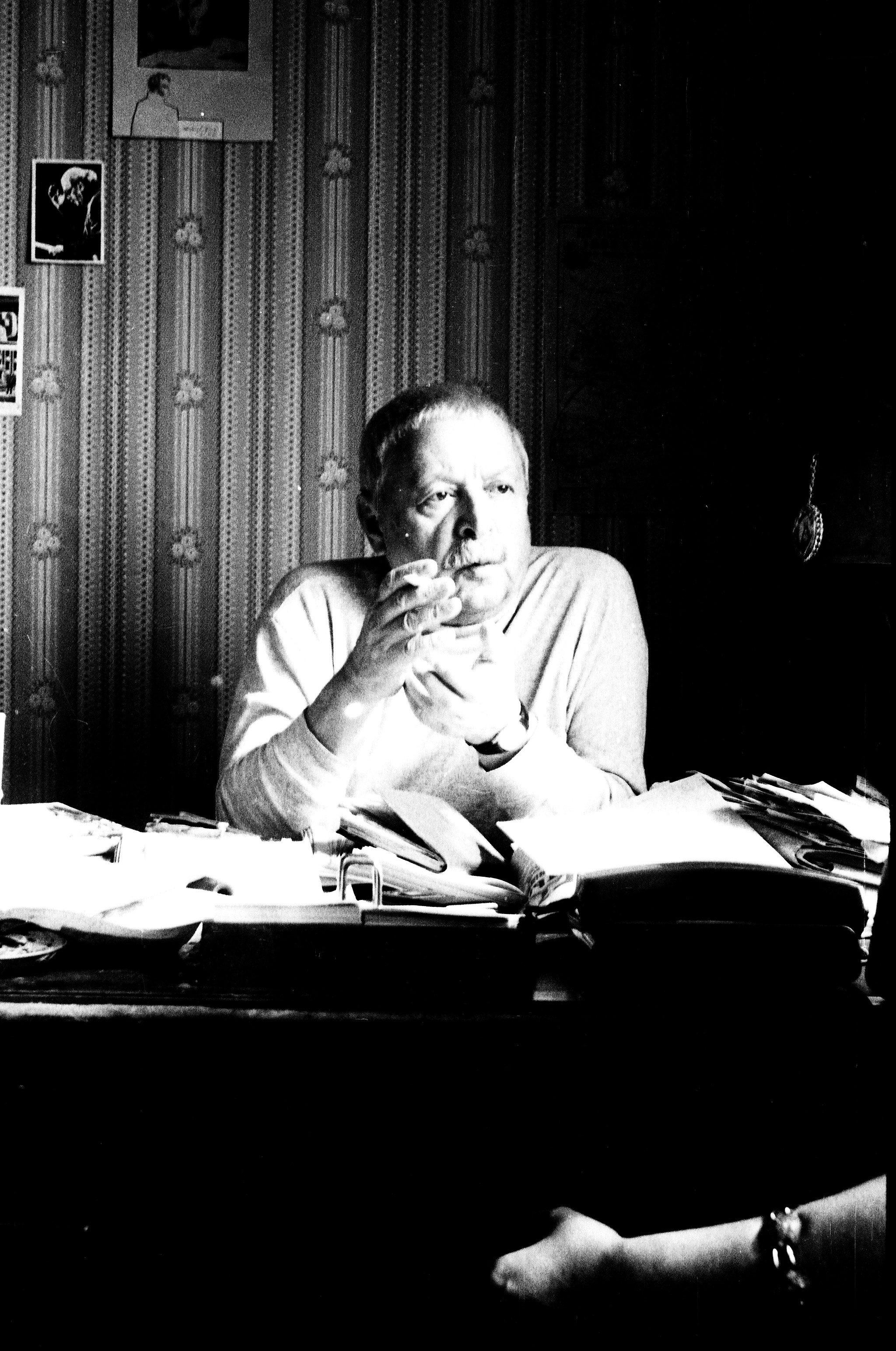
- 1995
- Born: 22 January 1922; Kozelets, Ukrainian SSR
- Died: 25 January 1996 (aged 74); Moscow, Russia
- Resting place: Vagankovo Cemetery
- Education: Maxim Gorky Literature Institute
- Occupations: Poet, translator
- Awards: State Prize of the Russian Federation; Order of the Patriotic War; Order of the Red Star; Medal "For Battle Merit"; Medal "For the Defence of Moscow"; Medal "For the Capture of Budapest"; Medal "For the Victory over Germany in the Great Patriotic War 1941–1945"; Medal "For the Victory over Japan"

Yury Davidovich Levitansky (Russian: Ю́рий Дави́дович Левита́нский; January 22, 1922, Kozelets, Chernigov Oblast, Ukrainian SSR — January 25, 1996, Moscow, Russia) was a Russian- language poet and translator from the USSR, a master of lyrical parody of genres, and Laureate of the State Prize of the Russian Federation in the field of literature and art in 1994.

== Biography ==
Levitansky fought in the Great Patriotic War. Afterwards, his first collection of poems was released in 1948 in Irkutsk. In the years 1955-1957 Levitansky studied in the Higher literary courses at Maxim Gorky Literature Institute. In 1957, he became a member of the Writers' Union. In 1963 he published a collection of poems called Earthly Heaven, which sprung him into fame as an author.

Many of Levitansky's poems were set to music, sung and performed by popular bards. Some of these songs are found in the movies Moscow Does Not Believe in Tears and Chivalric Romance.

In 1993 he signed the Letter of Forty-Two.

In 1995, at the ceremony of the aforementioned State Prize, Levitansky appealed to then Russian president Boris Yeltsin to halt the First Chechen War.
