= Valery Meladze =

Russian singer (born 1965)

Valery Meladze MAR
- Валерий Меладзе
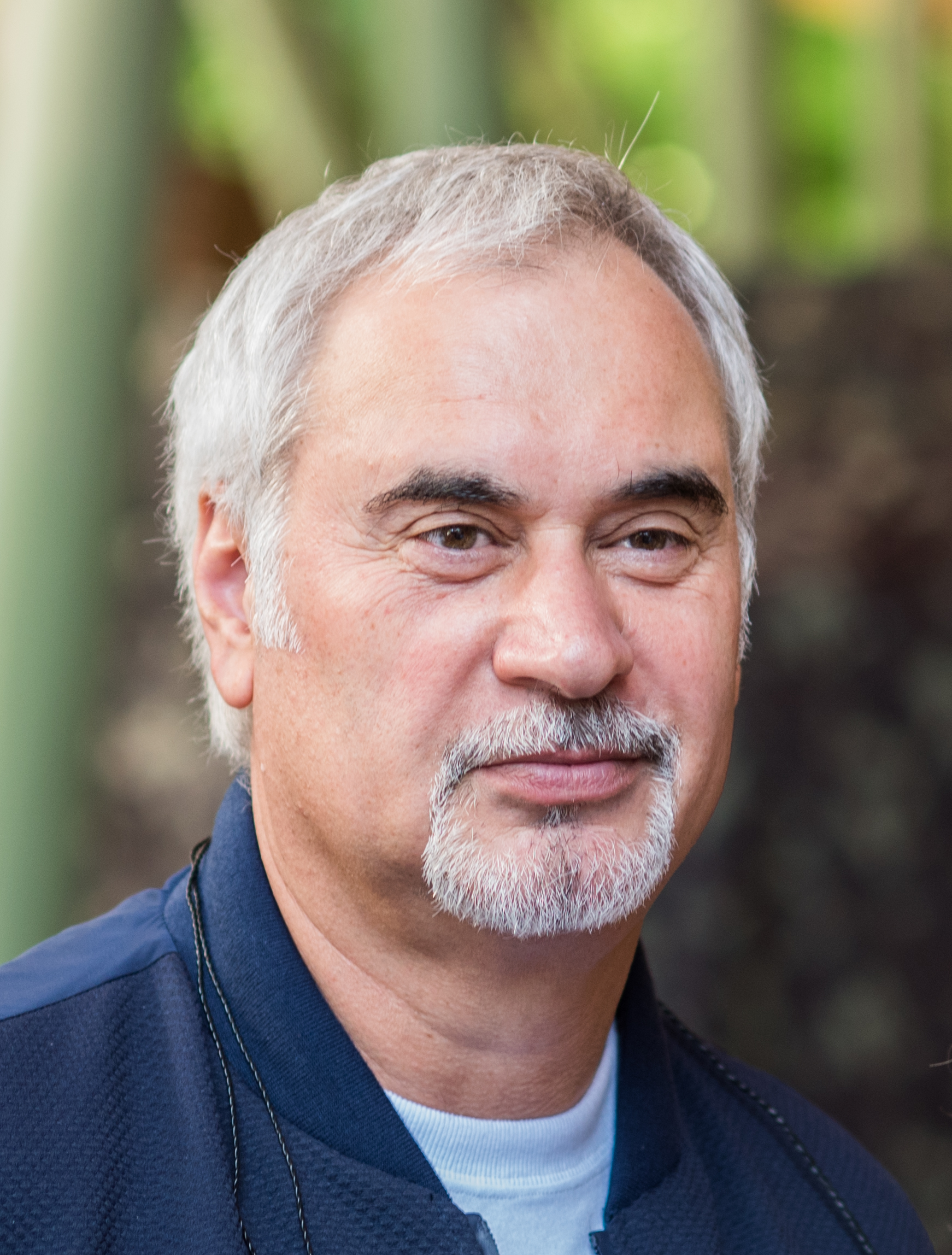
- Meladze in 2017
- Born: Valerian Shotayevich Meladze; 23 June 1965 (age 61); Batumi, Georgian SSR, Soviet Union (now Georgia)
- Citizenship: Soviet (former); Russian
- Education: Admiral Makarov National University of Shipbuilding
- Occupations: Singer-songwriter; record producer
- Years active: 1989–present
- Spouses: Irina Malukhina (m. 1989–2014); Albina Dzhanabaeva (m. 2014)
- Children: 7
- Relatives: Konstantin Meladze (brother)
- Awards: MAR; People's Artist of the Chechen Republic; Ovation; Pesnya goda; Golden Gramophone Award; Muz-TV Award; RU.TV Award
- Musical career
- Genres: Pop; art rock; pop rock
- Instruments: Vocal; piano
- Labels: Melodiya; Monolit Records; Velvet Music
- Website: www.meladze.ru

Valerian Shotayevich Meladze (Note: Russian: Валериан Шотаевич Меладзе, Georgian: ვალერიან შოთას ძე მელაძე) (born Valerian Shotas dze Meladze; 23 June 1965), known professionally as Valery Meladze, (Note: Russian: Валерий Меладзе) is a Georgian-born Russian singer and a Meritorious Artist of Russia. He is the brother of composer and producer Konstantin Meladze, who writes songs for him.

== Biography ==
=== Early life ===
Valerian Shotayevich Meladze was born on 23 June 1965 in Batumi to Shota and Nelly Meladze. He has an older brother, Konstantin (1963), and younger sister, Liana (1968). As a child, he went to music school and learned to play the piano. Upon completing school in 1983, he decided to follow in the footsteps of his parents, grandmother, and grandfather, all of whom were engineers, and so entered the Nikolayev Shipbuilding Institute in Ukraine to study marine power plant engineering. In 1985, Valery's brother started playing keyboard in the group "April." Valery joined the group as a back-up vocalist, but the band soon broke up.

=== 1989–1994: Career Beginnings ===
In 1989, an album the Meladze brothers had made with "April" reached Kim Breitburg, one of the lead members of the Soviet rock group, Dialog. Liking Valery's voice, Breitburg invited him to be the lead singer, and Konstantin was invited to write songs for the group. These efforts resulted in the band's 1991 album: "Poseredine Mira" (Посерeдине Мира; Middle of the World).

Dialog's popularity had declined, however, and the group disbanded in 1991. In 1992, Valeriy joined Dialog's founder Kim Breitburg and guitarist Viktor Litvinenko to form Gruppa Dialog and, later, Mistiquana, but in 1993 he also launched his solo career. During The Moscow Tour, Valeriy and Konstantin met their future producer Evgeniy Friedland. Evgeniy helped to record the first of Valeriy's songs – "Ne Trevoz Mne Dushu Skripka" (Не тревожь мне душу, скрипка; Don't Disturb my soul, violin). As Meladze later stated in interviews, after the success of the song, Evgeniy asked Valeriy to change his last name (surname) from "Meladze" to "Lisov" or "Lisovskiy," in effect translating it from Georgian to Russian ("mela" and "lisa" both meaning "fox" in their respective languages). However, he refused to change his name.

Many labels didn't want to work with Meladze, "because this music was not modern...long and not happy." But in 1993 Alla Pugacheva heard their demo record, and she invited Valeriy to sing their song at "The Christmas Meeting" in Moscow. After his success there, Valeriy released his debut solo album "Sera" (Сера) on the music label "Souz." The eponymous "Sera" became relatively popular, with "Poserеdine Leta" (Посередине Лета; The Middle Of Summer) and "Noch' Pered Rozdestvom" (Ночь Перед Рождеством; Christmas Eve) also seeing significant success.

=== 1995–1999: Continued Career ===
In end of 1995 Valeriy won two awards, Ovatsii and Zvezdy in nomination "Debut Of Year" and "The Best Singer of Year". In October 1996 his second studio album Posledniy romantik (The Last Romanticist) was released.

In early of 1997 was Valeriy gave 19 concerts in the biggest Russian cities. 7 and 8 March Valeriy sang in Olympiskiy, Moscow. In end of year was released first concert and video record album "Live Olympik Moscow".

In 1998, the brothers broke off their relationship with the producer Evgeniy Friendland and with label "Souz". But in January of that year, the third studio album Samba Belogo Motylka (Samba of the White Moth) was released. After a dispute with a producer, Valeriy changed his public image, he start to wear only formal clothes and the songs became more cruel and aggressive.

In 1999 Konstantin moved to Kyiv to work on the Ukrainian telechannel "Inter" and wrote fewer songs for his brother. Therefore, Valeriy released a greatest hits album "The Best". Many fans thought that Valery left show business. However, at the end of 1999 the fourth studio album was released – "Vsyo Tak I Bylo" (Russian: Всё так и было, All was this way) on a new label "Iseburg Mesic". Songs "Mechta" (Russian: Мечта, Dream), "Rossvetnaya" (Russian: Рассветная, Daybreakly) and "Krasivo" (Beautiful;Красиво) have topped the Russian charts. In the same year Meladze voiced cartoon "Neznajka Na Lune" and wrote a song with the same name.

=== 2000–present: Collaboration with "VIA Gra" and Later Career ===
In 2000 the Meladze brothers founded the Russian-Ukrainian pop group "VIA Gra (ВИА Гра). At this time Valeriy took a pause in his career. But in 2004 he released songs in collaboration with "Via Gra" "Prityazeniya Bolshe Net" (Притяжения Больше Нет; which can be translated both as 'No More Attraction' or 'No More Gravity') and "Okean I Tri Reki" (Ocean and Three rivers; Океан и Три Реки) (in 2003). In the same year a greatest hits album Nastojashee (Really, The real Ones; Настоящее) was released. Fedor Bondarchuk filmed a video "Komediant", which was banned in Russia. On March 1, 2002 Valeriy acted in the Kremlin and later that year performed 11 concerts on a US tour. The same year Meladze took part in a First Channel project "10 songs of Moscow" and sung the song "Podmoskovnie Vechera" (Russian: "Подмосковные вечера", "Moscow Nights").

In 2003 he released his fifth album Nega (Нега), including the songs "C'est la vie", "Ya NE Mogu Bez Tebya" and "Oskolki Leta", which was a hit in the CIS. In early 2003 the album Sera was re-released, "Poslednij Romantik", "Samba Belogo Motilka" and "Vse tak i bilo". Also the album "Nega" (Russian: Нега) was released. In 2004 Meladze won two awards "MUZ-TV" and "Russian Music Awards" as "The Best Vocalist", "The Best Song" (Pritashenya Bolishe Net) and "The Best Duet". In 2005 Valery was "The Best Singer" again and also won an award as "The Best Duet" with "Okean I Tri Reki". He has released a compilation "Okean" for the tenth career. In 2006 Valery won award as "Singer Of Year" and became a meritorius artist of Russia. The Meladze brothers were the producers of "Fabrika Zvezd-7" in 2007. In end of 2008 Valery became People's artist of Chechnya and released a sixth studio album "Vopreki"

== Awards ==
Meladze and Nu Virgos girl group were bestowed the title of the Best Duo of the Year at 2004 Russian Music Awards. On 2 June 2006 Meladze won the 4th Muz-TV Music Award as the Best Artist of the Year. On 24 August of the same year he was categorized as the Best Performer and the Best Artist at the MTV Russian Music Awards nominations. Valeriy is a Meritorious Artist of Russia and People's Artist of Chechnya.

== Discography ==
=== Studio albums ===
Sera
- Release: 1995
Posledny romantik
^{The Last Romanticist}
- Release: October 1996
Samba belogo motylka
^{Samba of the White Butterfly}
- Release: 1998
Vsyo tak i bylo
^{All Was This Way}
- Release: 1999
Nega
^{The Bliss}
- Release: 2003
Vopreki
^{Despite}
- Release: 2008

=== Extended plays ===
Chego ty hochezh ot menya! EP
^{"What Do You Want From Me? EP"}
- Released: 16 April 2020
- Label: Konstantin Meladze Music/First Music Publishing

=== Compilation albums ===
The Best
- Release: 1999
Nastoyashchee
^{Really}
- Release: October 2002
Okean
^{Ocean}
- Release: January 2005
The Best
- Release: 2009
Polsta
- Release: 2016

=== Concert album ===
Live Olympic Moscow
- Release: 1997

== Filmography ==
Year	Film	Role	Notes
2002	Cinderella	Father of Cinderella	Debut role in Russian-Ukrainian musicals
2003	Sorochinskaya Yarmarka	Devil	
2013	Yolki 3	Himself	

== Personal life ==
In the summer of 1989, he married an engineer, Irina, in Batumi. They have three daughters together, Inga (7 February 1991) who graduated from the University of Oxford, Sofia (19 May 1999) who attended MGIMO, and Arina (7 December 2002). The couple divorced in 2014. In 2014, he married Albina, in Moscow. They have two sons and one daughter together, Konstantin (26 February 2004), Luka (2 Jule 2014) and Agate (12 April 2021).
