= Chto oni znayut? =

Studio album by Egor Kreed
- Released: May 23, 2017
- Genres: Pop; Rap
- Length: 55:10
- Language: Russian
- Label: Black Star
- Producers: Timati, Egor Kreed (himself)

Egor Kreed chronology
Holostyak (2015)	Chto oni znayut? (2017)	58 (2020)

"Chto oni znayut?" (Russian: "Что они знают?"; English: "What do they know?") is the second studio album of Russian pop-rapper Egor Kreed, released on 23 May 2017 through the label Black Star. The day before the album was officially released, a pirated version of the album appeared on the Internet. This is Egor's last album with Black Star.

The album debuted at the top of the album charts on Apple Music & iTunes. Songs from the album also entered the top 10 on the charts: the song «Потрачу» took fourth place on Apple Music, while the song "Не могу" placed eighth on Apple Music and on iTunes. Based on the results at the end of 2017, "Что они знают?" was in the top-10 most popular albums on both Apple Music & iTunes in Russia.

== Track listing ==
No.	Title	Length
1.	"Интро"	2:40
2.	"Что они знают?"	2:56
3.	"Не могу"	3:18
4.	"Алло"	3:12
5.	"Потрачу"	3:04
6.	"Засыпай" (feat. Mot)	3:41
7.	"Стой"	3:33
8.	"Не обманывай"	3:31
9.	"Самба белого мотылька"	3:05
10.	"Что скажет мама?"	3:32
11.	"Зажигалки"	2:39
12.	"Если ты меня не любишь" (feat. Molly)	3:23
Total length:		55:10
