= Gucci (Timati song) =

"Гу́чи"

Single by Timati, Egor Kreed
- Language: Russian
- English title: Gucci
- Released: May 17, 2018
- Genre: hip hop
- Length: 3:45
- Label: Black Star Inc.

"Gucci" (Russian: "Гу́чи") is a song by Russian hip-hop singer Timati featuring Russian singer Egor Kreed. The track was released on 17 May 2018 as a single through the label Black Star Inc.

== Music video ==
The music video for the track was released on 22 May 2020 on Timati's YouTube channel. In it, the performers criticized "new school rap" using inscriptions on clothing such as brands and adlibs, mentioning the Russian national football team playing and a fashion show at the Gucci fashion house in 2018. According to Russian singer and blogger Klava Koka, who took part in the recording of the video, The video was recorded in the city of Dolgoprudny. The director for the video was Pavel Hoodyakov.

== Charts ==
=== Yearly charts ===
Chart (2018)	Position
(Russia) Top YouTube Hits (Tophit)	10
(Ukraine) Top YouTube Hits (Tophit)	48
(Commonwealth of Independent States) Top Radio & YouTube Hits (Tophit)	1
