= Crush (Klava Koka song) =

Single by Klava Koka feat. Niletto
- Language: Russian
- Released: June 10, 2020
- Genre: Pop
- Length: 2:51
- Label: Black Star Inc., Zion Music

"Crush" (Russian: «Краш») is a single by Russian singers Klava Koka and Niletto, released on 10 June 2020 through the labels Black Star Inc. and Zion Music.

== History ==
The single was first announced a week before its release, and on June 9, 2020, Klava Koka posted a video from a behind-the-scenes photo shoot in support of the single.

== Music video ==
The song's lyric video, directed by Artem Musikhin, was released on June 10, 2020. It is made in the style of a computer game, where the performers appear as cartoon characters.
