= 10AGE =

Russian rapper (born 1998)

- Born: Dmitry Alexandrovich Panov; January 21, 1998 (age 28); Bolshaya Izhora, Leningrad Oblast, Russia
- Genre: Hip hop
- Occupations: Rapper; songwriter; sound engineer
- Years active: 2018–present

Dmitry Alexandrovich Panov (Russian: Дми́трий Алекса́ндрович Пано́в; born 21 January 1998, Bolshaya Izhora, Leningrad Oblast), better known as 10AGE is a Russian rapper and songwriter. He started his hip hop career in 2018, and since then, he has released numerous singles, one EP, and the studio album "Б.О.М.Ж."

== Biography ==
=== Career launch (2018–2020) ===
Dmitry Panov didn't start working with music right away, rather it was ony after enrolling in the sound engineering program at the Saint Petersburg State Institute of Film and Television. After starting to work with sound, Dmitry became interested in music, began experimenting with sound, and at some point decided to release his own hip-hop compositions, inspired by the work of Kazakh rapper Skryptonite and American artists Tyler, the Creator, and Travis Scott.

== Personal life ==
He is married to fellow musician Anet Sai. Their romance became public in 2022. Since then, the artists have regularly appeared together at events, shared joint posts on social media, and emphasized their mutual support in their careers.

In June 2023, Dmitry proposed to Sai, and she accepted. However, the large-scale celebration was postponed until Summer 2025, as he was called up for military service in the Russian army that same year.

In addition to the public side of their relationship, the couple also collaborate on music.

=== Incidents ===
The song "No Interest" was supposed to be included in the official playlist of the Euro 2020 tournament along with Morgenstern's song "Leck", but after the track list was published, Morgenshtern and 10AGE's songs were removed by UEFA due to the presence of obscene language. The playlist for the tournament was curated by Dutch DJ and music producer Martin Garrix, and the tracks for it were selected by football players participating in the Championship. It included 97 tracks in total.

== Discography ==
=== Studio albums ===
Title	Details
«Б.О.М.Ж.»	Release: 11 November 2022; Label: DNK Music; Format: digital distribution
