= Ramil' =

Russian singer (born 2000)

Ramil Aleksandrovich Alimov Рами́ль Алекса́ндрович Али́мов
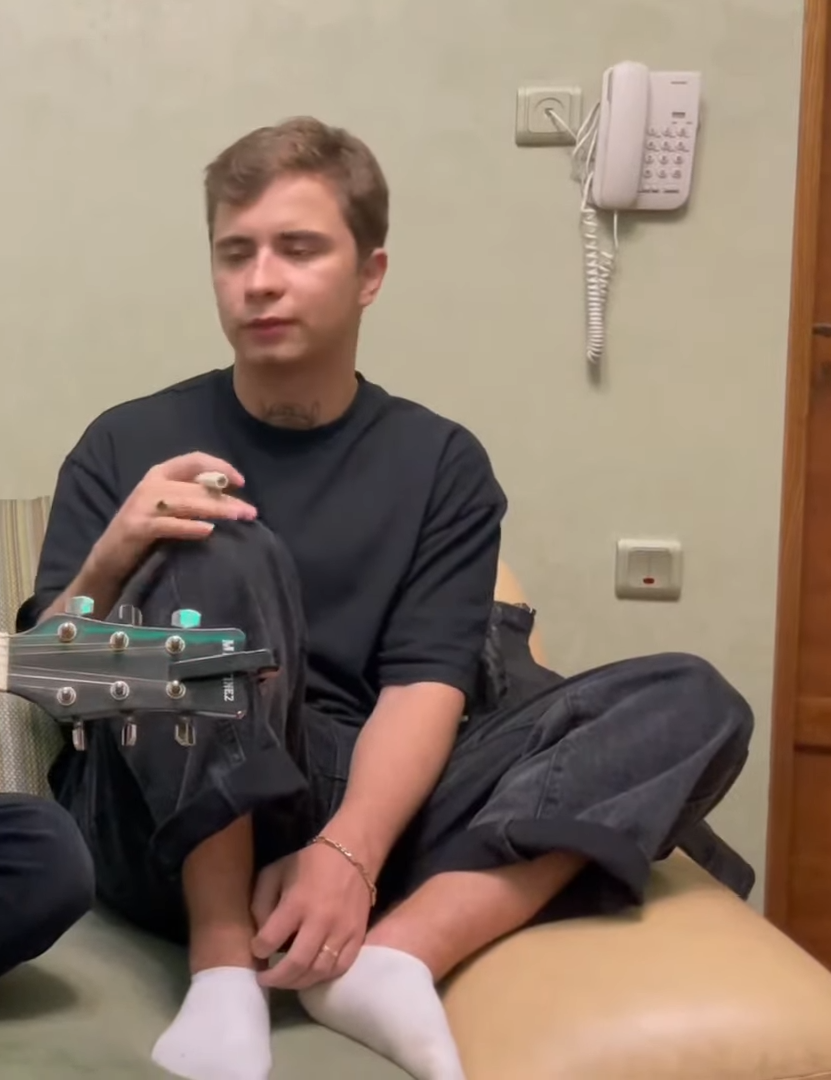

Background information
- Born: Ramil Aleksandrovich Alimov; February 1, 2000 (age 26); Nizhny Novgorod, Russia
- Origin: Russia
- Genres: Pop
- Occupation: Singer-songwriter
- Years active: 2018–present
- Labels: Sony Music Entertainment and RockFam
- Website: ramilmusic.com

Ramil Aleksandrovich Alimov (born 1 February 2000, Nizhny Novgorod, Russia) later Roman Orlov, better known as Ramil', is a Russian singer and songwriter. He became famous in 2019 when he released the single "Want with Me", and the album of surname. The song "Vsya Takaya V Belom" became first on the social network of Vokntakte.

In 2020, Ramil' released the single «Сияй», which topped the charts in the Commonwealth of Independent States.

== Biography ==
He attended the 172nd school in Nizhny Novgorod, and he went to music school for learning piano.

While in school, he took up boxing & mixed martial arts.

On 10 July 2020, the single «Сияй» was released, which was certified platinum twice in two weeks by the National Federation of Phonographic Producers (NFPF), and was a record for the country. Two months later, a music video for the song was released.

== Career ==
On 21 February 2020, Ramil' revealed his album «Всё, что есть у меня — это голод» by performing it in the club "1930".

At the end of September 2020, the song "Siyay" was featured in the top 15 songs in Afisha Daily, «under which the summer was ending in Russia».

In 2020, Ramil' released a song with Elena Temnikova. The track, «Из-за тебя», was released in February 2021 and topped the chart on "Нового Радио".

On 11 December that same year, Ramil' released a thirteen track album titled «Сияй».

== Discography ==
=== Studio albums ===
Title	Details
«Хочешь со мной»	Release: 12 April 2019; Label: Rhymes Music; Format: download, streaming
«Всё, что есть у меня — это голод»	Release: 13 September 2019; Label: Legacy Music; Format: digital, streaming
«Сияй»	Release: 11 December 2020; Label: Sony Music Entertainment; Format: digital, streaming
«Katana»	Release: 1 October 2021; Label: Sony Music Entertainment; Format: digital, streaming
«Молодой»	Release: 3 March 2023; Label: Effective Records; Format: digital, streaming
«Limar»	Release: 27 October 2023; Label: Cicada Music / Koala Music; Format: digital, streaming

=== Guest singer for others ===
Title	Year	Highest charted positions			Certification	Album
Title	Year	CIS			Certification	Album
Title	Year	Top Radio & YouTube Hits	Top Radio Hits	Top YouTube Hits	Certification	Album
«Пускай по венам соль»	2018	—	—	—	—	Non-album single
«Хочешь со мной»	2019	—	—	—	—	«Хочешь со мной»
«Айбала» (with Ханза)	2019	—	—	—	—	Non-album single
«Ау» (with 10AGE)	2019	—	—	—	—	Non-album single
«Отходосы» (with Alemond)	2019	—	—	—	—	Non-album single
«Моя пленница» (with LKN)	2019	175	—	94	—	«Джентльмен» (album of LKN)
«До луны» (with 10AGE & LKN)	2019	—	—	—	—	Non-album single
«Танцуй как пчела» (with DAVA)	2019	687	759	—	—	Non-album single
«Пальцами по губам»	2019	—	—	—	—	Non-album single
«Мадонна»	2020	—	—	—	—	Non-album single
«Вальс»	2020	86	249	62	—	Non-album single
«Сияй»	2020	12	63	7	Список: (Russia) РОФ: 2× Платиновый	«Сияй»
«Падали»	2020	166	191	—	—	«Сияй»
«Из-за тебя» (with Elena Temnikova)	2021	—	—	—	—	Non-album single
«Сон»	2021	—	—	—	—	Non-album single
«Плачь и танцуй» (with Ханза)	2021	—	—	—	—	Non-album single
«Дождь»	2021	—	—	—	—	Non-album single
«Друг» (OST "Друг на продажу")	2021	—	—	—	—	Non-album single
«Морфий»	2021	—	—	—	—	Katana
«Убей Меня» (with Rompasso)	2021	—	—	—	—	Non-album single
«Маяк»	2022	—	—	—	—	Non-album single
«Runaway» (with Rompasso & Kontra K)	2022	—	—	—	—	Non-album single
«MP3» (with Macan)	2022	—	—	—	—	Non-album single
«Не ищи меня»	2022	—	—	—	—	Non-album single
«Увидимся»	2022	—	—	—	—	Non-album single
«Просто лети»	2022	—	—	—	—	Non-album single
«Тает снег»	2022	—	—	—	—	Non-album single

=== Guest singer for others ===
Year	Artist	Musical release	Track
2019	LKN	Джентльмен	«Моя пленница»
2022	Macan	12	«Очередная грустная песня про тёлку»
