= Piyanu Domoy =

Single by Klava Koka
- Language: Russian
- English title: Drunk Home
- Released: December 9, 2020
- Genre: Pop
- Length: 2:34
- Label: Black Star

Piyanu Domoy (Russian: «Пьяную домой») is a song by Russian singer and blogger Klava Koka, released on 9 December 2020 as a single through the label Black Star.

== About the song ==
In the song, Klava Koka sings about how she drank too much, but at the same time allows her boyfriend to do with her whatever he wants, because she understands that she will later be ashamed of her behavior. The song's composers were Klava Koka herself, Maxim Ivanik, Konstantin Koksharov, and Alexander Mikheev.
