= Mne pokh =

Single by Klava Koka feat. Morgenshtern
- Language: Russian
- Released: November 14, 2019
- Genre: Dance; pop; pop rap
- Length: 2:38
- Label: Black Star

"Mne pokh" (Russian: «Мне пох») is a song by Russian singer Klava Koka and hip-hop singer Morgenshtern, released on 14 November 2019 as a single from Klava Koka's studio album "Неприлично о личном."

== History ==
On October 10, 2019, Klava Koka covered Morgenshtern's single "Novy Merin," after which the two agreed to collaborate.

Danil Golovkin of InterMedia called the song "a subtle arrangement of the song "Moonlight" by XXXTentacion."

== Music video ==
On December 3, 2019, a music video for the original song, edited by Vladimir Kovalev, was released.
