= 58 (album) =

2020 album by Egor Kreed

Studio album by Egor Kreed
- Released: 10 April 2020
- Recorded: 2019–2020
- Genres: Hip-hop; pop-rap
- Length: 16:58
- Language: Russian
- Label: Warner Music Russia

Egor Kreed chronology
Chto oni znayut? (2017)	58 (2020)	Pussy Boy (2021)

58 is the third studio album of Russian recording by Russian singer Egor Kreed, released on 10 April 2020 through the Russian record label Warner Music Group. The album features singers HammAli & Navai, Morgenshtern, Nyusha and Dava. The artist also did a live broadcast on Instagram with Nyusha, where they talked about their album track, how the track was recorded, and their relationship overall. The album and the title of the first track comes from the artist's hometown. The name of the album, 58, comes from the code of Penza Oblast. This is Egor Kreed's first album since he left the label Black Star.

== Track listing ==
58 track listing
No.	Title	Producer	Length
1.	"58"		1:52
2.	"Мне всё Монро" (featuring HammAli & Navai)		2:19
3.	"Хуракан"		2:14
4.	"Барби" (featuring Dava)		2:30
5.	"Девочка с картинки"		2:27
6.	"Mr. & Mrs. Smith" (featuring Nyusha)		3:09
7.	"Весёлая песня" (featuring Morgenshtern)	Alex Davia	3:07
Total length:			16:58

== Charts ==
Chart performance for 58
Chart (2020)	Peak position
Estonian Albums (Eesti Tipp-40)	5
Latvian Albums (LaiPA)	14
Lithuanian Albums (AGATA)	92
