= Basta 4 =

Studio album by Basta
- Released: April 20, 2013
- Genre: Hip hop
- Length: 82:37
- Language: Russian
- Label: Gazgolder

Basta 4 (Russian: «Баста 4») is the fourth studio album by Russian rapper Basta, released on 20 April 2013 through the label Gazgolder.

In January 2017, the internet portal The Flow, together with its partner re:Store, named the album "Basta 4" one of the twenty most important albums for the genre released in the 2010s.

== Track listing ==
No.	Title	Writer(s)	Length
1.	"Интро"	Basta	4:55
2.	"Это дороже денег"	Basta	5:14
3.	"Мама"	Basta, Mikhey	4:35
4.	"Листья пуэра под кипяток"	Basta	4:00
5.	"Моя вселенная" (featuring Тати)	Basta	3:31
6.	"Рэп, который по-лютому прёт"	Basta	4:56
7.	"Джузеппе" (featuring Smoky Mo)	Basta, Smoky Mo	4:10
8.	"С надеждой на крылья" (featuring "Нервы")	Basta, Нервы	5:28
9.	"CrazyMFLove"	Basta	4:59
10.	"Пуэрчик покрепче"	Basta	4:54
11.	"Я или ты" (featuring Тати)	Basta	4:36
12.	"Грустно" (featuring Green Grey)	Basta, Green Grey	5:31
13.	"Пар"	Basta	4:40
14.	"Чистый кайф"	Basta	6:05
15.	"Одна любовь" (featuring Рем Дигга)	Basta, Рем Дигга	5:27
16.	"Райские яблоки"	Basta, Vladimir Vysotskiy	4:02
17.	"Это всё" (featuring "Адели")	Basta, Адели	5:28

- 2011 — "Райские яблоки"
- 2012 — "Мама" (сover: Mikhey)
- 2013 — "ЧК (Чистый Кайф)"
- 2013 — "Интро с альбома #Баста4"
- 2013 — "Это Дороже Денег"
- 2013 — "Я или Ты"
- 2014 — "Моя Вселенная" (OST: #ГазгольдерФильм)
- 2014 — "Рэп, который по-лютому прёт"
- 2015 — "Пуэрчик покрепче"
