= Skryptonite =

Kazakh rapper (born 1990)

Skryptonite Скриптонит
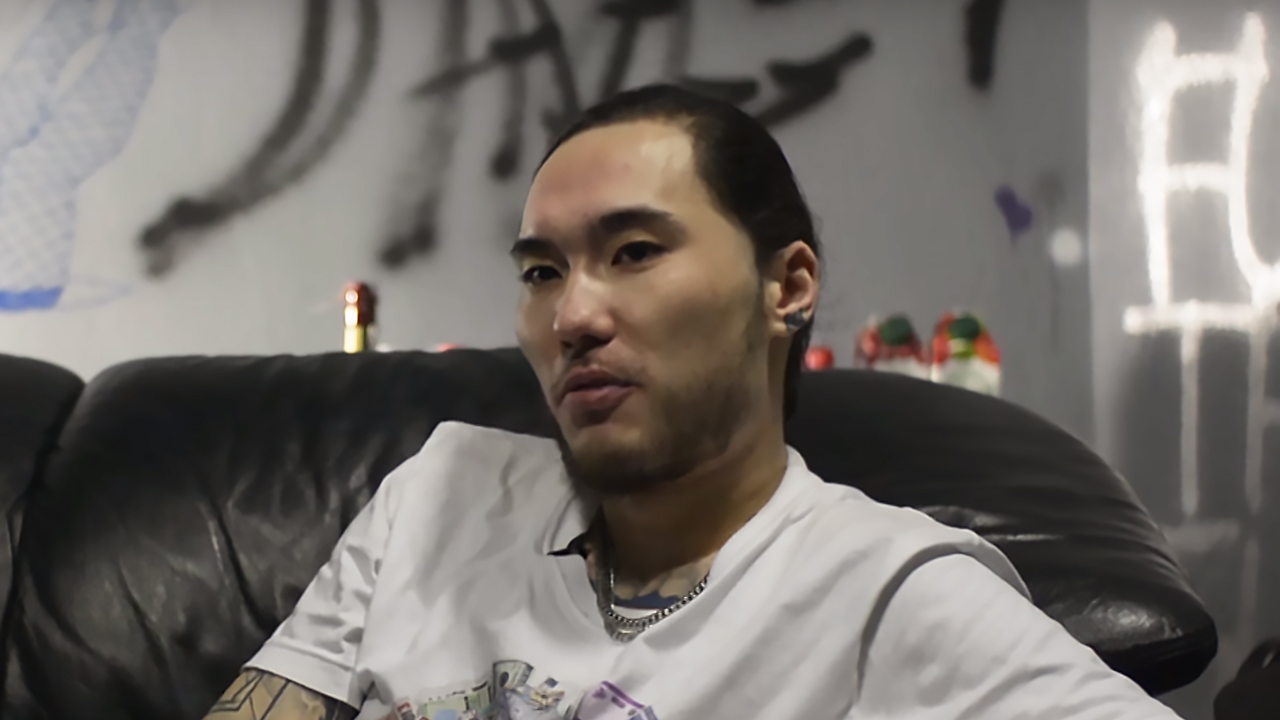
- Skryptonite in 2016

Background information
- Born: Adil Oralbekovich Kulmagambetov; 3 June 1990 (age 36); Leninsky, Pavlodar Region, Kazakh SSR, Soviet Union
- Genres: alternative hip-hop; hip-hop; rap; trip-hop; R&B; rap-rock; blue-eyed soul
- Occupations: Rapper; Music producer
- Instrument: vocals
- Years active: 2009–present
- Labels: DME (Dilla Muzic Entertainment); Musica36 (2019–2022); Gazgolder (2013–2018)

Ädıl Oralbekūly Jälelov (Note: Kazakh: Әділ Оралбекұлы Жәлелов; Russian: Адиль Оралбекович Жалелов, romanized: Adil Oralbekovich Zhalelov) (né Kulmagambetov; (Note: Kazakh: Құлмағамбетов, romanized: Qūlmağambetov, Russian: Кулмагамбетов) born 3 June 1990), known professionally as Skryptonite (Russian: Скриптонит, romanized: Skriptonit), is a Kazakh rapper, singer, songwriter, and music producer. He is the founder of the record label Musica36.

Skryptonite gained prominence in 2013 after releasing a music video for his debut single, «VBVVCTND». His first studio album, Dom s normalnymi yavleniyami (transl. House with Normal Activity), followed in late 2014 and became one of the most commercially successful Russian-language rap albums of 2015.

In 2018, Skryptonite divided his artistic output into two distinct projects: Skryptonite (as a solo act) and Gruppa Skryptonite (Russian: Группа Скриптонит; "Skryptonite Group"). According to the artist, this separation reflects differences in both live performances and recorded material. Gruppa Skryptonite functions as an eight-member band performing reimagined arrangements, while solo Skryptonite concerts adhere to a "rapper and DJ" format with backing tracks.

In 2021, Skryptonite was named the most-streamed artist in the Commonwealth of Independent States (CIS) by the media outlet Muzyka Pervogo.

== Biography ==
=== Early years ===
Adil Kulmagambetov was born on 3 June 1990 in the village of Leninsky (now Atameken), Pavlodar Region, northeastern Kazakhstan. He is the son of Oralbek Zhalelovich Kulmagambetov (born 1 September 1953).

Zhälelov developed an interest in music during his teenage years, citing rap as a primary influence by age 11. By 15, he had begun composing his own music. He later reportedly changed his surname from Kulmagambetov to Zhälelov (a patronymic derived from his father’s first name, Oralbek), though official records, including the Kazakh State Revenue Committee registry, continue to list him under his birth name.

=== First successes ===
In 2009, Skryptonite co-founded the hip-hop group JILLZ alongside collaborator Anuar Baimuratov (stage name Niman). The lineup also included Yuri Drobitko (Yurik Thursday), Sayan Zhimbaev (Truwer), Azamat Alpysbaev (Six O), and Aidos Dzhumalinov (Strong Symphony). Prior to signing with the Russian label Gazgolder, Skryptonite independently released several singles that gained traction, establishing him as a pioneer of authentic trap music in the CIS region.

A pivotal moment came in 2013 with the release of the music video for «VBVVCTND» (stands for "Vybor bez variantov — vse chto ty nam dal") (Russian: «Выбор без вариантов — всё что ты нам дал»; transl. Choice without options is all you gave us), a collaboration with Niman. The track’s success attracted attention from Gazgolder, which signed Skryptonite on 27 February 2014. He later cited 2014 as the defining year of his career.

In 2015, Skryptonite contributed to the collaborative album Basta / Smokey Mo with Russian rappers Basta and Smoky Mo. Its single «Cosmos», featuring singer Dasha Charusha, peaked on iTunes charts and ranked 22nd on The Flow's "50 Best Tracks of 2015". Concurrently, his music videos for «Ice» and «Slumdog Millionaire» amassed millions of YouTube views, with the latter securing #2 in Rap.ru’s Best Russian Clips of 2015. The Flow also ranked «Ice» at #46 in its annual top tracks list.

By October 2015, Skryptonite was shortlisted for the Hip-Hop Award at the Jägermeister Indie Awards. In 2016, he was nominated for Discovery of the Year by GQ Russia.

=== 2015: House with Normal Phenomena and critical acclaim ===
Skryptonite released his debut studio album, House with Normal Phenomena (Russian: Дом с нормальными явлениями; stylized as an allusion to the film "House with Paranormal Phenomena") on 24 November 2015. The album debuted at number two on the iTunes album chart in Russia, surpassing rapper Oxxxymiron’s Gorgorod and trailing only British singer Adele's then-new release.

Gazeta.Ru columnist Yaroslav Zabaluev praised the album’s conceptual depth and genre diversity, noting: "In an hour and a half, [Skryptonite] delivers not just atmospheric work but a stylistic mosaic—from trap and New York hip-hop to near-gospel."

The album became one of the most acclaimed Russian-language rap releases of 2015, earning Skryptonite Rapper of the Year honors from Colta.ru. It ranked among the year’s best albums in multiple publications:

- #6 in Afisha's 30 Best Albums of 2015
- #1 in Rap.ru’s and The Flow’s respective rankings of top Russian-language albums
- Included in Gazeta.Ru's 20 Best Albums of 2015

Three tracks from the album garnered significant attention:

- «Style»: Its music video ranked #5 in Rap.ru’s Best Russian Videos of 2015, while the song placed 15th in The Flow’s Top 50 Tracks of 2015.
- «Dance by Yourself»: Ranked #3 in the same Top 50 Tracks list.
- «Priton»: Its video was included in Afisha’s 100 Greatest Clips of 2015.

=== 2016: Delayed albums and accolades ===
Skryptonite initially planned to release his second studio album concurrently with his 2015 debut, House with Normal Phenomena. In a January 2016 interview with Meduza, he announced the near-completion of an album titled 3P (stylized as Tripy), slated for release that month. However, the project was delayed indefinitely and later retitled Hotel Everest.

In September 2016, Skryptonite was named Discovery of the Year by the Russian edition of GQ magazine.

On 29 October 2016, the collective Jillzay Band—of which Skryptonite was a member—released the 18-track album 718 Jungle. Skryptonite contributed vocals and production to half of the album’s tracks.

=== 2017–2018: A Celebration on Street 36, Zorski Music Label, and Uroboros ===
On 7 March 2017, the collective Jillzay released the mini-album Open Season.

Skryptonite’s second studio album, A Celebration on 36th Street (Russian: Праздник на улице 36), was released on 24 May 2017. Hours prior, he dropped the single «Outro» and a dual music video for «Party» (as Skryptonite) and «Bar "2 Lesbuchi"» (as Jillzay). At the album’s launch event on 26 May 2017 at Saint Petersburg's Club A2, Skryptonite announced plans for another album—initially titled Street 36—to be released later that year. In an interview with L'Officiel Russia editor-in-chief Ksenia Sobchak, he described Street 36 as a double album diverging stylistically from his earlier work and addressing personal struggles.

Following the dissolution of Jillzay, Skryptonite founded the music label Zorski, signing artists 104 (Yuri Drobitko), Truwer (Sayan Zhimbaev), and Benz (Altynbek Merkanov). In September 2017, 104 and Truwer released their collaborative album Safari, co-produced by Skryptonite.

On 16 December 2017, Skryptonite unveiled his third studio album, the double concept work Uroboros, comprising Uroboros: Street 36 and Uroboros: Mirrors. The title references the uroboros, a mythical serpent symbolizing cyclicality. Explaining the choice to Gazeta.Ru he stated:

"...I realized this image resonates with me, tied to the number 36. The ouroboros—a snake devouring itself—embodies self-improvement through self-destruction, which mirrors my journey."

The album premiered at Club A2 in Saint Petersburg. During an Instagram Live broadcast that day, Skryptonite declared rap "outdated" and announced a 2–3 year hiatus from solo projects.

=== 2018–present: Gruppa Skryptonite, Musica36, and 2004 ===
On 9 August 2018, Skryptonite released «Glupye i Nenuzhnye» (transl. Stupid and Unnecessary), the first single from his new collective Gruppa Skryptonite. Notably, its music video premiered on the group’s official YouTube channel instead of Gazgolder's.

On 24 October 2018, Skryptonite collaborated with T-Fest, 104, and Niman on the single «Multi-Brand». The same day, he appeared on the premiere episode of GazLive’s second season, announcing his return to rap and work on an EP featuring unreleased material from the Ouroboros sessions.

In 2019, Skryptonite co-founded the label Musica36 with collaborators 104, Truwer, and Dose. The label released five singles between February and March:

- «It’s Hot in Hell Today» (104 featuring Dose and Skryptonite)
- «Liquor Bath» (Dose)
- «Podruga» (Gruppa Skryptonite; accompanied by a music video)
- «Sinsemilla» (104 with Skryptonite, Vander Phil, and Rigos)
- «Danced» (Dose featuring Andy Panda)

Gruppa Skryptonite performed «Podruga» live on 31 March 2019, followed by reworked versions of «Priton» and «Suka tashit nas na dno» (originally from House with Normal Phenomena) on 1 April.

On 5 April 2019, the collective released their debut EP, Solitude, featuring six tracks including earlier singles.

On 28 June 2019, Skryptonite dropped the maxi-single Frozen, containing collaborations with Andy Panda and solo tracks. His fourth studio album, 2004, followed on 24 December 2019, featuring guest appearances by Andy Panda, 104, Truwer, MDee, and Ryda.

Reflecting on the album for Apple Music, Skryptonite stated:

"I started writing this album a little over a year ago. I wasn't going to write a rap album, but nevertheless new songs were written and for some reason quite easily.

This is the first album that I wrote all the music on myself, even though on the other records most of the music was mine too. It doesn't have any narrative concept or storyline stretching from beginning to end, but it sounds solid and very special to me personally. Probably because it's almost all done with all sorts of analog synths and drum machines and sounds warm, like the 2000s.

For me, it's the first album that I can listen to in the background and not think about it being my record."

On 20 February 2020, 104 released the album Cinema Without Cigarettes, with Skryptonite contributing to three tracks: «Not Sorry» (with Miyagi), «Snow», and «Pipes» (with Saluki).

On 13 November 2020, Skryptonite and Niman unveiled the collaborative EP PVL Is Back, featuring four tracks addressing themes of excess, relationships, and legal struggles.

Scryptonite left Russia after the Russian invasion of Ukraine in February 2022 and closed his label and media in Russia.

== Musical style and reviews ==
Skryptonite describes his music as "Kazakh rap" and rejects being labeled a "Russian performer" or his work as "Russian rap". His early lyrics focused on childhood experiences and school life, later transitioning to self-referential "rap about rap" before shifting to socially relevant themes in the early 2010s.

Unlike many Russian-language rappers who prioritize complex lyricism, Skryptonite emphasizes production and musicality, often handling composition and instrumentation himself. Critics and fans note his distinct vocal delivery—a slurred, laid-back style humorously dubbed "Yeltsin-flow"—which, paired with his gritty timbre, defined the experimental sound of his debut album House with Normal Phenomena. To maintain artistic independence, he avoids listening to Russian-language music, including works by peers.

Following House with Normal Phenomena's release, Skryptonite received widespread acclaim. Russian rapper Oxxxymiron praised the album’s "musical frenzy and originality," while artists such as: Pencil (Denis Grigoryev), Johnyboy (Denis Vasilenko), ATL (Sergey Kruppov), Ivan Dorn, and Guf (Alexei Dolmatov) lauded its innovation and production.

== Discography ==
=== Studio albums ===
- 2015 — House with Normal Phenomena
- 2017 — A Celebration on 36th Street
- 2017 — Ouroboros: Street 36 / Mirrors
- 2019 — 2004
- 2021 — Whistles and Papers
- 2021 — Bad Habits (with Indablack & qurt)
- 2023 — YEAHH, Pt. 1
- 2024 — YEAHH, Pt. 2
- 2024 — serenity.exe

=== Mini-albums ===
- 2017 — Open Season (with Jillzay)
- 2019 — Solitude (with Gruppa Skryptonite)
- 2019 — Frozen
- 2019 — Don't Lie, Don't Believe (with 104)
- 2020 — PVL is Back (with Niman)

=== Compilations ===
- 2015 — To You (with Gazgolder artists)
- 2016 — 718 Jungle (with Jillzay)
- 2019 — Musica36: How I Spent This Summer (with Musica36 artists)

== Personal life ==
Skryptonite maintains strict privacy regarding his personal life, abstaining from sharing family photos or details on social media. However, in April 2017, a brief appearance in Basta's music video for «Sansara» showed him holding an infant. He later confirmed the child was his son, Luchi (named after Skryptonite’s mother), born on 19 January 2016. The mother, Nigora Abdiganieva, is a dancer and choreographer from Shymkent, Kazakhstan, whom Skryptonite met years prior to his fame. The couple dated for several years before separating.

Abdiganieva, credited as Nigora, appeared in multiple music videos prior to 2013, including:

- "Это ЮГ" (This Is the South) with rapper Aidan (2012), featuring her rapping and dancing.
- "Джага" with B. Jigga and Davinci.
- A cameo in Kazakh rapper HIRO’s "Вверх" (Up) (2012).
- Skryptonite’s «Green Theater» concert invitation video.

In a 2018 interview with journalist Yury Dud, Skryptonite revealed that after Luchi’s birth, he relocated his family to Moscow. Abdiganieva later returned to Shymkent with their son, resuming her career at a local dance studio. The rapper acknowledged infrequent visits due to his demanding work schedule, stating he rarely travels to Kazakhstan to see them.

== Awards and nominations ==
- 2016 — GQ Russia — Winner, Discovery of the Year ("Man of the Year" awards).
- 2016 — The Real MusicBox Award — Winner, Out of Format category.
- 2021 — Apple Music Awards — Winner, Artist of the Year (Russia).
