= Azbuka Morze =

Azbuka Morse

Studio album by Mot
- Released: March 25, 2014
- Genres: Hip hop; Rap
- Length: 44:18
- Language: Russian
- Label: Black Star Inc.

Azbuka Morze is the third studio album by Russian hip-hop singer Mot, released on 25 March 2014 through the label Black Star Inc.. Guest singers on the album include L’One, Миша Крупин, Nel and Timati.

== Background ==
Work on album lasted over a year. Each track was remixed 8-10 times. The title of the album was announced with the release of the single "Black Day" (i.e.: March 27). On March 3, 2014, Mot and Black Star revealed the cover, tracklist, and release date of the album.

== List of compositions ==
No.	Title	Lyrics	Music	Length
1.	"Эдем"	Mot	Danielmusic	4:07
2.	"Бенджамин" (feat. L'One)	Mot, L'One	Platinum Sellers Beats	4:16
3.	"Барон Мюнхгаузен"	Mot	Lexi Banks, Capella (Diamond Style Productions)	4:29
4.	"Женщина" (feat. Миша Крупин)	Mot, Миша Крупин	Tony Fadd	3:18
5.	"24-7" (feat. Nel)	Mot, Nel	Vybe Beats	4:18
6.	"#Мотсейчасвклубе"	Mot	Tony Fadd	1:31
7.	"Мать-и-мачеха"	Mot	4EU3	4:13
8.	"Страна OZ"	Mot	Platinum Sellers Beats	3:45
9.	"8-е чудо света"	Mot	Flashbeats, Danielmusic	3:34
10.	"Veni! Vidi! Vici!"	Mot	Mikkey Vall, Danielmusic	4:23
11.	"Чёрный день"	Mot	Cooarri	2:10
12.	"Молодая кровь" (feat. Тимати)	Mot, Timati	Platinum Sellers Beats	4:08
Total length:				44:18
