= Kristina Si =

Russian singer (born 1991)

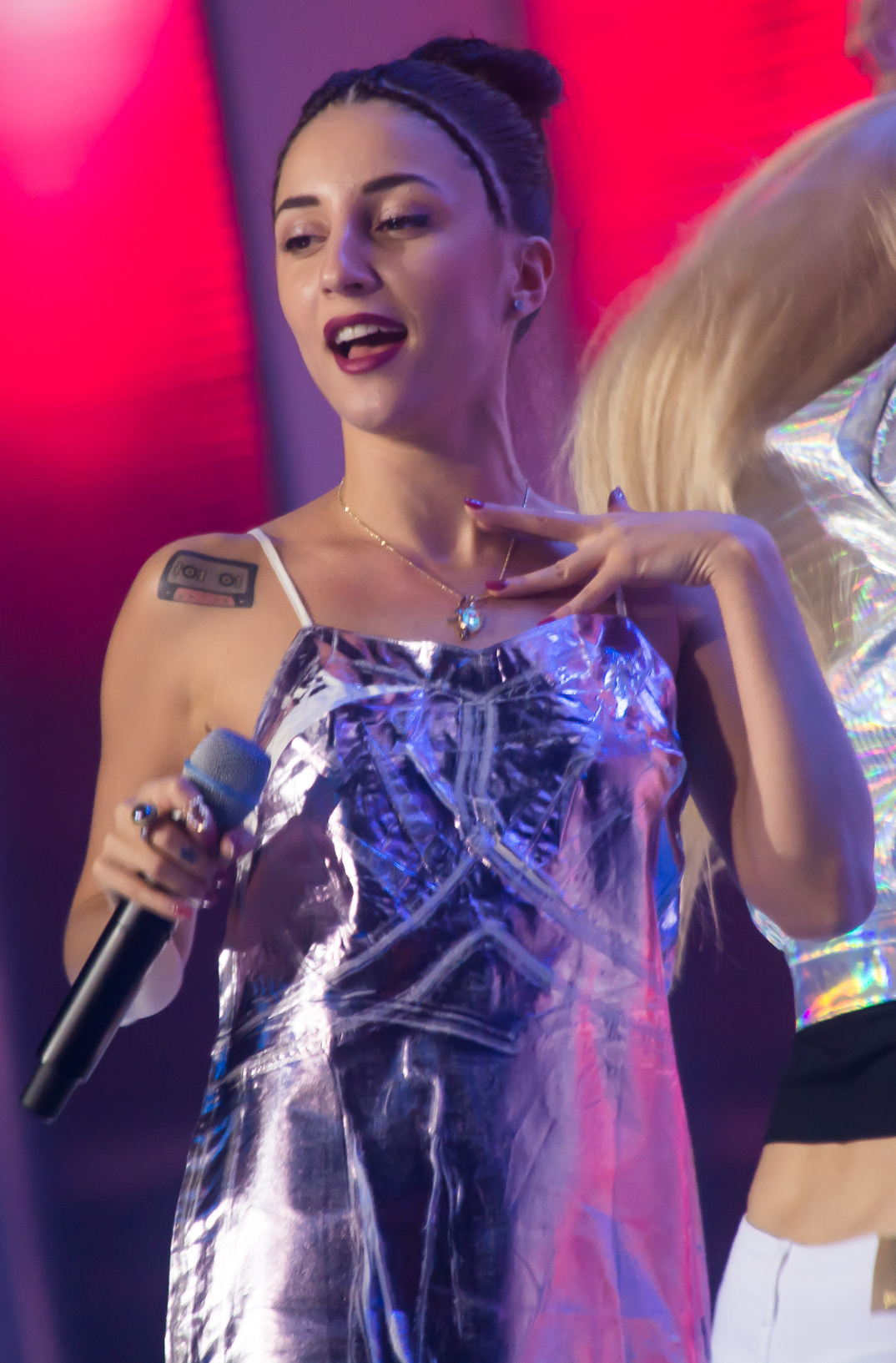
Kristina Si in 2016

Kristina Elkhanovna Sarkisyan (Russian: Кристи́на Эльха́новна Саркися́н; born 9 March 1991, Tula, RSFSR), better known as Kristina Si, is a Russian singer. She became widely known after signing with the label Black Star in 2013, staying there until 2018. In December 2022, she signed with the label Gazgolder.

== Biography ==
Kristina Elkhanovna Sarkisyan was born to a family of circus performers. Until she was 6 years old, together with her parents moving from place to place, she lived in a traveling circus owned by her parents.

In June 2015, she was on the jury for the dance competition «Just Dance» on A-One.

On 28 November 2016, Kristina Si released her debut album titled «Светом во тьме». The album came with 15 songs, including collaborations with artists Скруджи & Dima No One from the Black Star label.

In November 2017, Kristina Si gave an exclusive interview in «Fashion People», where she talks about her work with «Black Star» and about the ideal man. Kristina got on the cover of the magazine.

In April 2018, she launched her own clothing line.

== Discography ==
=== Studio albums ===
- «Светом во тьме» (2016)

=== Singles ===
- 2011 — «Я улетаю»
- 2011 — «Начинаю забывать»
- 2011 — «Хочу сказать» (feat. Music Hayk)
- 2012 — «Bad Boy»
- 2012 — «Не рядом»
- 2013 — «Зима»
- 2013 — «Ну ну да»
- 2013 — «Разряд» (feat. DJ Pill.One)
- 2013 — «Посмотри» (feat. Timati)
- 2013 — «Планета» (feat. Мот)
- 2014 — «Мне не смешно»
- 2014 — «Mama Boss»
- 2014 — «Юрик» (Diss on Yuriya Khovanskovo)
- 2014 — «Ты готов услышать нет?» (feat. Natan)
- 2014 — «В твоих — моих мечтах»
- 2015 — «Не обижай меня»
- 2015 — «Мы так и не узнали» (feat. Хатын)
- 2016 — «Хочу»
- 2016 — «X»
- 2016 — «Космос»
- 2016 — «Тебе не будет больно»
- 2017 — «В твоих, моих мечтах»
- 2018 — «Рассвет»
- 2018 — «Из-за тебя»
- 2018 — «Тадж-Махал»
- 2018 — «Не узнали»
- 2019 — «MAMI»
- 2019 — «Вечериночка»
- 2020 — «Река»
- 2020 — «Остаться внутри» (feat. Krec)
- 2020 — «Ждать тебя»
- 2020 — «Крис Кроссы»
- 2020 — «Hasta la vista»
- 2020 — «Просто возьми»
- 2021 — «Где мои подарки?»
- 2021 — «Me so bad»
- 2021 — «Say My Name»
- 2021 — «FWB»
- 2021 — «Chem Haskanum» (feat. Maléna)
- 2022 — «В фиолетовых тонах»
- 2022 — «Двигай» (feat. Jaman T)
- 2022 — «На губах»
- 2022 — «Bad For You»
- 2022 — «Осень» (feat. Yangy)
- 2022 — «Твой мир»

=== Featured on other albums with other singers ===
- L’One — «Спутник» («Бонни и Клайд»), «Гравитация» («Черёмуха»)
- Мот — «Чёрточка» («Планета»)
- MC Doni — «В пути» («Султан»)
- Rodionis — «Not Sad Anymore» («Sad Party Tape»)
- Kasta — «Альбомба» («Кто сказал жених»)

== Videography ==
Year	Video
2011	Хочу сказать (feat. Music Hayk)
2012	Начинаю Забывать
2012	Bad Boy
2013	Ну Ну Да
2013	Посмотри (feat. Timati)
2013	Планета (feat. Мот)
2014	Мне не смешно
2014	Mama Boss
2014	Юрик
2015	Ты готов услышать нет? (feat. Natan)
2015	Султан (feat. MC Doni)
2016	Хочу
2016	Космос
2016	Секрет (feat. Скруджи)
2016	Кто тебе сказал? (feat. Dima No One)
2017	Тебе не будет больно
2017	Х
2018	Рассвет
2019	MAMI
2020	Река
2020	Из-за тебя
2021	Me so bad
2021	FWB

=== Mood Videos ===
Year	Clip
2020	Просто возьми
2022	Bad For You

== Awards and nominations ==
Year	Title	Nominated work	Category	Results
2014	OOPS! CHOICE AWARDS	Kristina Si	«R&B/Hip-hop — проект»	Nominated
2014	OOPS! CHOICE AWARDS	Kristina Si	«Лучшая танцующая звезда»	Nominated
2015	OOPS! CHOICE AWARDS	Kristina Si	«R&B/Hip-hop — проект»	Nominated
2016	OOPS! CHOICE AWARDS	Kristina Si	«Лучший сольный проект»	Nominated
2016	OOPS! CHOICE AWARDS	Не обижай меня	«Лучший cингл»	Nominated
2016	TOP HIT MUSIC AWARDS	Kristina Si	«Радиовзлёт 2016»	Won
2016	«Женщина года»	Kristina Si	«Певица года»	Nominated
2016	Russian MusicBox	Kristina Si	«ХИП-ХОП ГОДА»	Nominated
2016	Russian MusicBox	Хочу	«Креатив года»	Nominated
2016	Russian MusicBox	Хочу	«Песня года»	Nominated
2017	«Дай Пять!»	Kristina Si	«Любимая певица»	Won
2017	Премия «RU.TV»	Kristina Si	«Фан или профан»	Nominated
2017	«Женщина года»	Kristina Si	«Певица года»	Nominated
