= Siyay =

Single by Ramil'

from the album Siyay
- Language: Russian
- Released: July 10, 2020
- Genre: Pop
- Length: 2:01
- Label: Sony Music

Siyay (Russian: "Сияй") is a song by Russian singer and songwriter Ramil’, released on 10 July 2020 as the lead single from his third studio album, which has the same name. The track's producer was Prague-based music producer Zane98.

== Music video ==
The track's official music video was released on 30 September on the YouTube channel of Ramil'. The video features a group of people who have gone through a breakup. Among these people is Ramil'. Throughout the video, he tells his breakup story, which comes to life in his imagination. In the words of Ramil', the main point of the video is to bring attention to the problems of the modern man.
