= Matrang =

Russian rapper (born 1995)

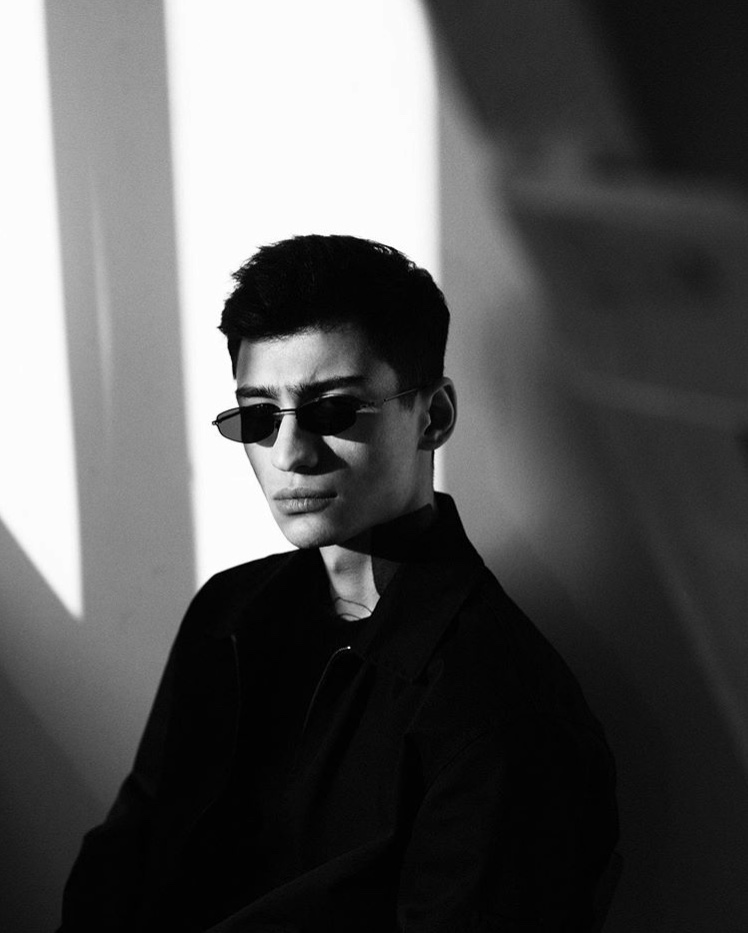

Background information
- Also known as: Matrang, Don ShaL
- Born: Alan Arkadievich Khadzaragov; April 20, 1995 (age 31); Vladikavkaz, Russia
- Genres: Hip hop; Pop rap; trap; Deep house; Hip house
- Occupations: Musician; rapper; singer
- Years active: 2012-2024
- Labels: Moon Mafia, Gazgolder

Alan Arkadievich Khadzaragov (Russian: Алан Аркадьевич Хадзарагов; born 20 April 1995, Vladikavkaz), better known under the pseudonym Matrang, is a Russian musician, singer, and rapper. Since 2017, he has been part of the music label Gazgolder. He is the owner of the musical award "Zolotaya Gorguliya" with the nomination "best soul-project".

== Biography ==
Alan Khadzaragov was born on 20 April 1995, in Vladikavkaz to an Ossetian family. His mom is a teacher, who now leads mountain excursions, and his father is engaged in creativity. He has two sisters and a brother.

In his youth, Khadzaragov painted, played in theater and sang.

After returning to Russia on 21 February 2024, Matrang's family entered him into a rehabilitation center. The singer's sister explained that the decision was based on his drug addiction.

== Discography ==
=== Albums ===
Title	Information
Планета Луна	Release: 2015; Label: Moon Mafia; Format: Digital distribution
Красная Луна	Release: 2017; Label: Moon Mafia; Format: Digital distribution
ЭЙА	Release: 25 May 2018; Label: Gazgolder; Format: Digital distribution
DA	Release: 31 January 2019; Label: Gazgolder; Format: Digital distribution
ТРИ	Release: 27 March 2020; Label: Gazgolder; Format: Digital distribution

== Awards and nominations ==
Year	Award	Nomination	Category	Result
2018	Russian National Music Award	Matrang — "Медуза"	Best hip-hop artist	Nominated
2018	Muz-TV Awards	Matrang — "Медуза"	Best song on RuNet	Nominated
2019	Muz-TV Awards	Matrang — "Медуза"	Best male video	Nominated
