= Holostyak =

2015 album by Egor Kreed

Studio album by Egor Kreed
- Released: April 2, 2015
- Recorded: 2013–2015
- Genre: Pop
- Length: 48:11
- Language: Russian
- Label: Black Star
- Producers: Timati, Pavel Murashov

Holostyak (Russian: Холостяк) is the debut studio album by Russian singer Egor Kreed, released on 2 April 2015 through the label Black Star. Egor released several songs prior to the album's release, and attracted a lot of Russian press, in which he was called the Russian Justin Timberlake.

Released in support of the album were five singles, the most successful of which was «Самая самая», which in the spring of 2015 got second place on the Russian chart Top Radio Hits, eleventh place in the final radio chart rankings for 2015 and entered the list of the best selling tracks according to the Russian charts on iTunes at the end of 2015, taking eighth place. The single «Невеста» made it to fifth place on the radio chart Tophit and achieved 42nd place at the end of the year.

== Recording members ==
- Egor Bulatkin (Egor Kreed) — the album's artist, co-producer, lyricist, music composer (tracks 1, 2, 3, 4, 6 through 11)
- Pavel Murashov — producer (tracks 1, 6, 7, 10, 11)
- Timur Yunusov (Timati) — general producer
- Matvey Melnikov (Мот) — guest artist, vocals (track 6)

== Track listing ==
Information from the booklet of the album Холостяк.
No.	Title	Writer(s)	Length
1.	"Самая самая"	Egor Bulatkin; Mikhail Reshetnyak	3:50
2.	"Закрой глаза"	Bulatkin; Reshetnyak; Vladislav Palagin	3:50
3.	"Запомни и запиши"	Bulatkin; Reshetnyak	3:19
4.	"Надо ли"	Bulatkin; Stefan Hinterlang; Nicolas Scholtes	3:20
5.	"Ревность"	Aleksandr Bodnar; Robert Rozhdestvensky; Bulatkin; Reshetnyak; Galina Nemchenok; Sergei Pinson; Yevsey Alesker; Lidiya Kozlova	3:18
6.	"Не мы"	Bulatkin; Egor Gleb	2:58
7.	"Только ты, только я"	Bulatkin; Elliot Waite	3:38
8.	"Ей наплевать"	Bulatkin; Kirill Tverdun	2:40
9.	"Невеста"	Bulatkin; Reshetnyak; Tverdun	3:26
10.	"Не вынести"	Bulatkin; Palagin	3:20
11.	"Тишина"	Bulatkin; Tverdun	2:46
12.	"Мы просто любили так"	Bulatkin; Reshetnyak; Tverdun	3:07
13.	"Берегу"	Bulatkin; Reshetnyak	3:12
14.	"Папина дочка"	Bulatkin; Reshetnyak	2:40
15.	"Холостяк"	Bulatkin; Reshetnyak	2:47
Total length:			48:11

Deluxe Version
No.	Title	Writer(s)	Length
16.	"Я останусь" (featuring Arina Kuzmina)	Bulatkin	3:21
17.	"Вдаль"		3:04
18.	"You're My Galaxy"		3:58
19.	"Важно"		3:15
20.	"Самая самая" (music video)		3:56
Total length:			1:13:11
