= Slovetsky =

Russian rapper (born 1982)

Valentin Aleksandrovich Presnov
- Also known as: Slovetsky
- Born: August 15, 1982 (age 43)
- Genres: Rap
- Occupation: Rapper
- Label: Gazgolder
- Member of: Slovetsky (2003-)

Valentin Aleksandrovich Presnov (Russian: Валенти́н Александрович Пресновborn August 15, 1982, Karaganda, Kazakh SSR, USSR), better known as Slovetsky (Russian: Словетский), is a Russian rapper, member of the rap group Konstanta, and artist of the record label and creative association Gazgolder.

== Biography ==
Valentin Presnov was born in Kazakhstan in the city of Karaganda. In 1997, at the age of 15, he and his family moved to New York City. There, he finished high school, entered graduate school, and received a degree in finance and a Master of Business Administration.

He is married and has 2 children.

== Career ==
=== 2008–2011 ===
In 2010, Konstanta toured Russia for the first time, performing in St. Petersburg and Moscow, having previously filmed a music video in New York City for their collaboration with Slim, "Demony". The video was released on 11 October, ahead of Slim's second album. After some time, Severny returned to New York. Soon, Slim and Solovetsky began recording a collaborative album, with Severny joining in from New York via the internet. The album evolved into a collaboration between Slim and Konstanta. On 31 May 2011, the album Azimut was released on compact disk by Nikitin Records, with support from TsAO Records. The album was also made available for free download on the portal thankyou.ru.

== See also ==
- Russian hip hop
- Oxxxymiron
- Husky (rapper)
