= T-Fest =

Ukrainian rapper (born 1997)

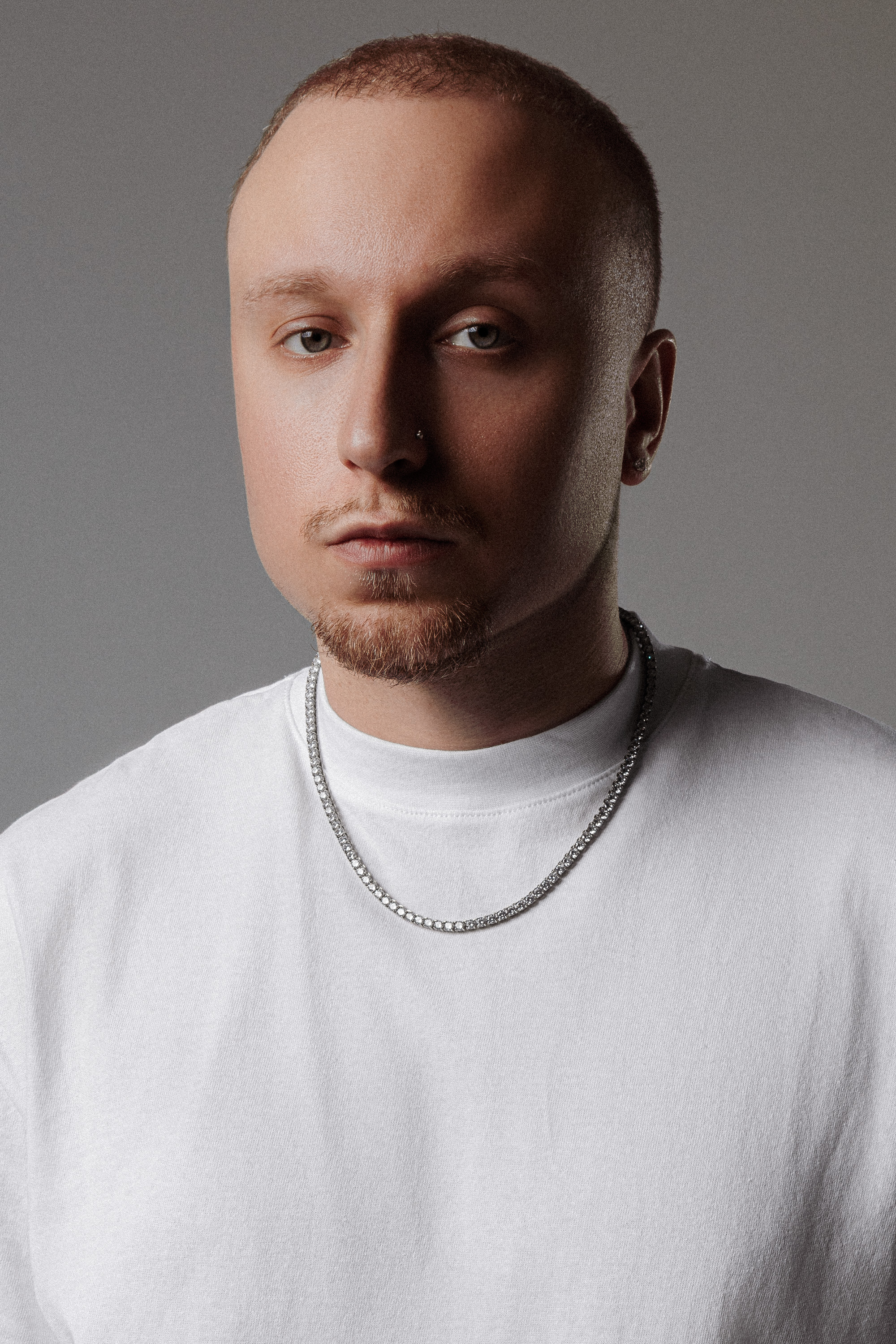

Background information
- Born: Kirill Nezboretsky; Кирилл Незборецкий; May 8, 1997 (age 29); Chernivtsi, Ukraine
- Genres: Pop; Trap
- Occupations: Rapper; songwriter
- Years active: 2012-present
- Labels: Gazgolder (2017–2022); Lemniskata (2022-present)

Kirill Igorevich Nezboretsky (Russian: Кирилл Игоревич Незборецкий (Ukrainian: Кирило Ігорович Незборецький; born 8 May 1997, Chernivtsi, Ukraine), better known under his stage name T-Fest (Russian: Ти-Фест), is a Ukrainian rapper and song writer.

== Biography ==
Kirill Nezboretsky was born in the city of Chernivtsi to a family of docters. He attended music school and took piano classes.

In 2018, he released the album "Иностранец."

In 2020, he released the album "Выйди и зайди нормально" and the EP "Любовь/грустно."

On 7 December 2020, T-Fest's film "Мама, я еду домой. Пролог" was released. It highlights the main events in Kirill's life.

== Family ==
- His father, Igor Vladimirovich Nezboretsky, was the head of the health department of the Chernivtsi city council, and is an honored doctor of Ukraine.
