= Slame =

Russian rapper (born 1994)

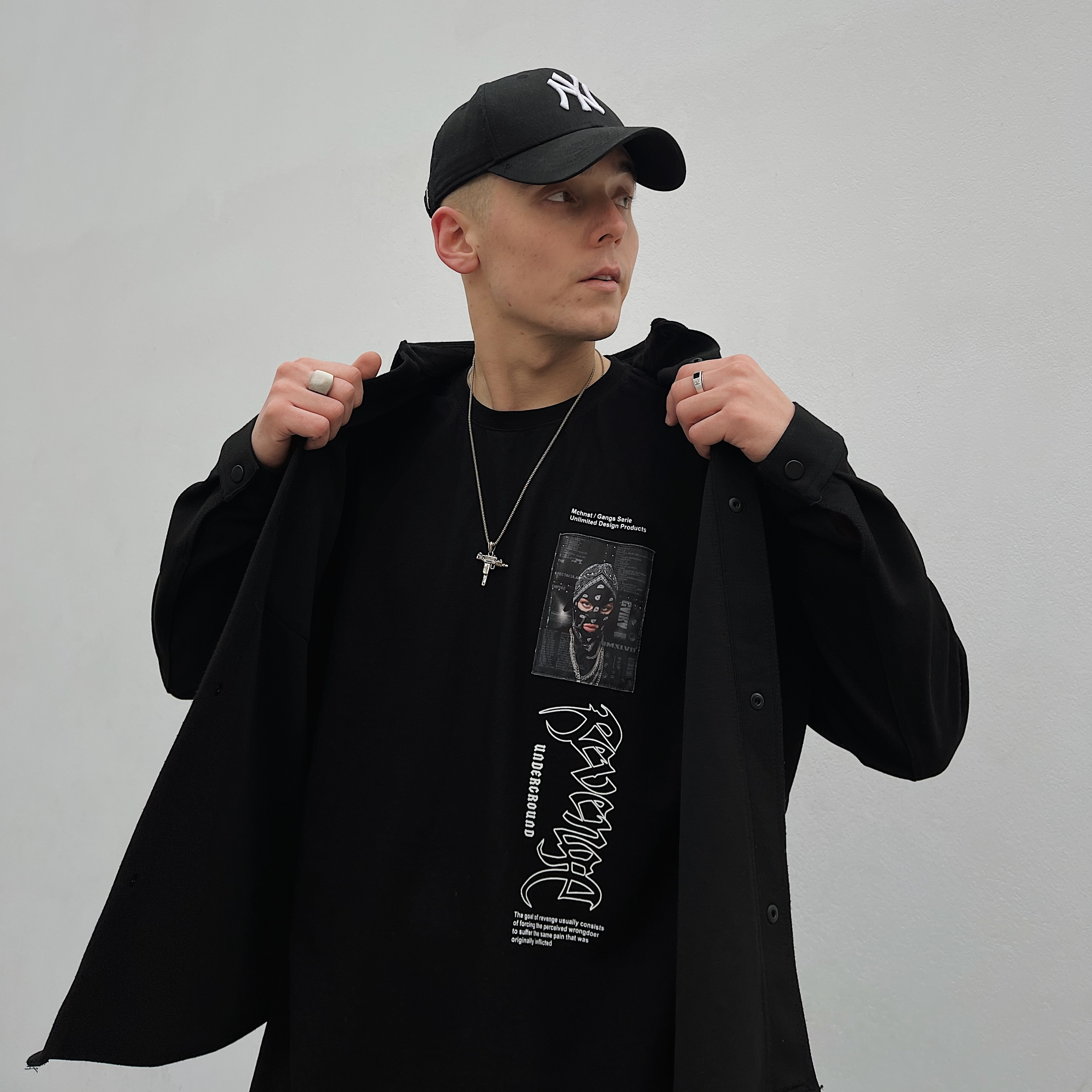
- October 2021

Background information
- Born: Vyacheslav Vyacheslavovich Isakov; December 18, 1994 (age 31); Almetyevsk, Tatarstan, Russia
- Genres: Hip hop
- Occupation: Rapper
- Label: Black Star

Vyacheslav Vyacheslavovich Isakov (Russian: Вячесла́в Вячеславович Иса́ков; born 18 December 1994, Almetyevsk, Tatarstan), better known as Slame (Russian: Слейм), is a Russian rapper signed to the label Black Star.

== Biography ==
Isakov was born on 18 December 1994 in the city of Almetyevsk (Tatarstan).

In 2018, Slame released a collection of his top songs, which he called «Избранное».

External videos
- Видеоклип на «Ютюбе» • «Мои слёзы» (Песни, 4 концерт)

== Discography ==
=== Albums ===
Album	Details
«Избранное»	Release: 28 June 2018; Label: Slushai Music; Format: Digital Distribution

Year	Title	Charts				Notes
Year	Title	Russia				Notes
Year	Title	TopHit Top Radio & YouTube Hits	TopHit Top Radio Hits	TopHit Top YouTube Hits	Zvooq. online Top-20	Notes
2018	«Sub-Zero»					digital single, 23 Apr. 2018
2018	«Low X Down»					digital single, 13 Jul. 2018
2018	«#Слышьчё» (feat. Kinky Hurts)					digital single, 17 Aug. 2018
2018	«Sub-Zero» (Emr3ygul Remix)					digital single, 29 Aug. 2018
2018	«О тебе»					digital single, 20 Sept. 2018
2018	«Low X Down» (feat. Domino)					digital single, 24 Sept. 2018
2019	«Сгораем»					digital single, 22 Mar. 2019
2019	«Маленький человек»					digital single, 21 Apr. 2019
2019	«Говори Да»					digital single, 28 Apr. 2019
2019	«По пятам» (ARS-N & Slame)					digital single, 5 May 2019
2019	«Номад» (Say Mo & Slame)					digital single, 12 May 2019
2019	«Секрет» (Say Mo & Slame)					digital single, 19 May 2019
2019	«Голодные игры» (Amchi, Say Mo, Боронина, Slame)					digital single, 19 May 2019
2019	«Слёзы» (Timati & Slame)				7	digital single, 25 May. 2019
2019	«Polaroid»	144	—	18	10	digital single, 26 May. 2019
2019	«Гидравлика»					digital single, 2 Jun. 2019
2019	«Твой ход» (Slame & Нazима & Amchi)	—	—	—	—	digital single, 25 Jun. 2019
2019	«Кто ты такой?»					digital single, 10 Jul. 2019
2019	«Миллионы»					digital single, 4 Sept. 2019
2019	«Кто ты такой?» (ST, Глеб Калюжный, Дима Масленников, Mozee Montana, Slame) [Longmix]					digital single, 6 Sept. 2019
2019	«Мне с тобой кайф»					digital single, 30 Oct. 2019
2019	«Твоя лента - топ»					digital single, 6 Dec. 2019
2019	«Больше не слова» (Slame & Зомб)					digital single, 17 Dec. 2019
2020	«Радио хит» (Глеб Калюжный & Slame)					digital single, 17 Jan. 2020
2020	«Падаем»					digital single, 7 Feb. 2020
2020	«Сайлент Хилл» (ERSHOV & Slame)					digital single, 16 Apr. 2020
2020	«18» (Revera & Slame)					digital single, 24 Apr. 2020
2020	«Девочка пьяна»					digital single, 15 May 2020
2020	«DEEP LOVE» (Slame & Cherocky)					digital single, 16 Jun. 2020
2020	«Чё ты» (TERNOVOY, Зомб, ST, Slame) [Longmix]					digital single, 13 Jul. 2020
2020	«Ну подумаешь любовь» (Slame & Anfisa Ibadova)					digital single, 10 Aug. 2020
2020	«Беспредел»					digital single, 17 Sept. 2020
2020	«Ты звезда»					digital single, 7 Oct. 2020
2020	«Друг помоги мне» (Hensy × Slame)				—	digital single, 7 Dec. 2020
2021	«Братан»					digital single, 20 Jan. 2021
2021	«Пряный ром» (Slame & NЮ)					digital single, 1 Mar. 2021
2021	«Мерин»					digital single, 28 Apr. 2021
2021	«Наваливай»					digital single, 8 Jun. 2021
2021	«Москва не верит слезам»					digital single, 22 Jul. 2021
2021	«Созвездие» (Анет Сай & Slame)					digital single, 2 Sept. 2021
2021	«Поговорим, мама»					digital single, 30 Sept. 2021
2021	«Досвидос»					digital single, 21 Oct. 2021
2021	«Бабочка»					digital single, 24 Nov. 2021
2021	«Инь Янь»					digital single, 23 Dec. 2021
2022	«Я пью» (Slame & РУВИ)					digital single, 27 Jan. 2022
2022	«КАРДО»					digital single, 1 Feb. 2022
2022	«Паника»					digital single, 31 Mar. 2022
2022	«Те слова» (Slame & ERSHOV)					digital single, 21 Apr. 2022
2022	«В чём сила?» (Derouse & Slame)					digital single, 12 May. 2022
2022	«Дай мне»					digital single, 23 Jun. 2022
2022	«Молодым»					digital single, 4 Aug. 2022
2022	«Надо проснуться»					digital single, 25 Aug. 2022
2022	«Доберёмся до вершин» (Slame & Анет Сай)					digital single, 2 Sep. 2022
2022	«Одно и тоже»					digital single, 19 Oct. 2022
2022	«Братан 2»					digital single, 29 Nov. 2022
2022	«Было и прошло»					digital single, 21 Dec. 2022

== Videography ==
Year	Title	Director	Album
2018	«Двигай» (feat. Vlad Well)	Unknown	Избранное
2019	«Polaroid»	Alena Pozhidaeva	Single
2019	«Кто ты такой?» (ST, Глеб Калюжный, Дима Масленников, Mozee Montana, Slame) [Longmix]	Unknown	Single
2019	«Миллионы»	Alexander Romanov	Single
2019	«Мне с тобой кайф» (Mood video)	Unknown	Single
2019	«Твоя лента - топ» (Mood video)	Unknown	Single
2019	«Больше не слова» (feat. Зомб) (Mood video)	Unknown	Single
2020	«Радио хит» (feat. Глеб Калюжный) (Mood video)	Alexander Li	Single
2020	«Падаем»	Alena Pozhidaeva	Single
2020	«Сайлент Хилл» (feat. ERSHOV) (Mood video)	Alena Pozhidaeva	Single
2020	«DEEP LOVE» (feat. Cherocky)	no data	Single
2020	«Чё ты» (TERNOVOY, Зомб, ST, Slame) [Longmix]	no data	Single
2020	«Ну подумаешь любовь» (feat. Anfisa Ibadova) (Mood video)	Slava	Single
2020	«Беспредел» (Mood video)	no data	Single
2020	«Ты звезда» (Mood video)	Denis Ermolaev	Single
2021	«Пряный ром» (feat. NЮ) (Mood video)	Марк	Single
2021	«Москва не верит слезам»	Gennady Agadzhanyan	Single
2022	«В чем сила?» (feat. Derouse) (Mood video)	Unknown	Single
2022	«КАРДО» (Mood video)	Ivan Bondarev	Single
2022	«Доберёмся до вершин» (feat. Anet Sai)	Unknown	Single
Featured in other singers' videos
2020	«Баленсиага» (clip of Caramel & Kara Kross)	Unknown	Single
