= Pussy Boy =

Studio album by Egor Kreed
- Released: 16 July 2021
- Genre: Russian hip hop
- Length: 24:16
- Language: Russian
- Label: Warner Music Russia
- Producers: Palagin; Маленький ярче; Kayyo

Egor Kreed chronology
58 (2020)	Pussy Boy (2021)

Pussy Boy (Russian: "Мальчик Кисок") is the fourth studio album by rapper Egor Kreed, released on 16 July 2021 through the Russian division of the label Warner Music Group. The album was preceded by the single "Здравствуйте", written with OG Buda, and its music video. The album features guest appearances from OG Buda, Mayot, Blago White, Guf, and Soda Luv.

== Accolades ==
Accolades for Pussy Boy
Platform	Rating	Position	Ref.
Apple Music	Top 10 albums in Russia	4	
The Flow	Top 50 domestic albums of 2021	16	

== Track listing ==
Pussy Boy track listing
No.	Title	Producer	Length
1.	"Pussy Boy"	Palagin	2:14
2.	"Здравствуйте" (featuring OG Buda)	Palagin	2:16
3.	"На мне Hoe"	Palagin	2:09
4.	"Puff" (featuring Mayot)	Маленький ярче	2:06
5.	"Дед Роет"	Palagin	2:11
6.	"Dorogo" (featuring Blago White)	Kayyo; Маленький ярче	3:27
7.	"Choppa"	Palagin	2:12
8.	"Автомат" (featuring Guf)	Palagin; Маленький ярче	2:59
9.	"Телефон"	Palagin; Маленький ярче	2:05
10.	"Грустно" (featuring Soda Luv)	Palagin	2:33
Total length:			24:16
