= Mot (rapper) =

Russian rapper (born 1990)

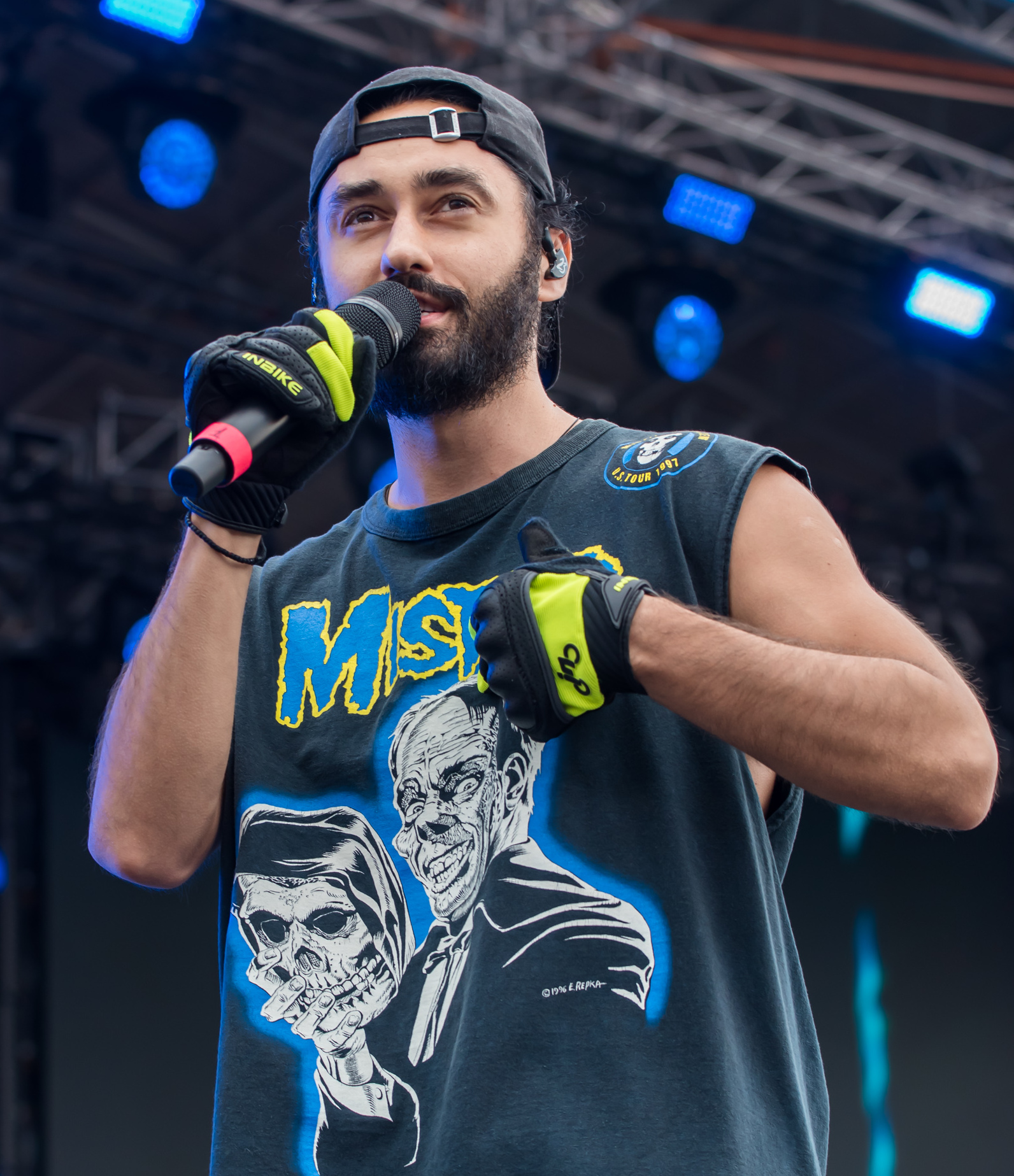

Background information
- Born: Matvey Aleksandrovich Melnikov (Russian: Матвéй Алексáндрович Мéльников); March 2, 1990 (age 36); Krymsk, Krasnodar Krai, Russian SFSR, Soviet Union
- Genres: Hip Hop; Soul; Electronic
- Occupations: Rapper; singer; songwriter
- Years active: 2008-present
- Label: Black Star

Matvey Aleksandrovich Melnikov (Russian: Матвéй Алексáндрович Мéльников; born March 2, 1990 in Krymsk), better known by his stage name Mot (Russian: Мот), is a Russian musician and pop-singer. From 1 March 2013 until 22 January 2022, he was an artist with the label Black Star.

== Biography ==
=== Early period ===
Matvey Melnikov was born in Krymsk. At the age of five, he and his family moved to Krasnodar. At 10 years old, he started to take up dancing at the Krasnodar branch «Тодес». In 2012, he defended his thesis and enrolled in graduate school.

=== Music career ===
Mot's debut album was released in January 2011, titled Remote. The album consists of 12 tracks, including collaborations with musicians Ilya Kireev, Katrin Mokko & ms. Sounday. The album was recorded and mixed by Denis KOKA beats. In September 2011, a video for the song «Миллионы звёзд» was published.

=== Family ===
In August 2016 Matvey Melnikov married former model Maria Gural. In April 2017 they had a wedding. On 22 January 2018 the couple welcomed their son Solomon.

== Sanctions ==
In April 2018 Melnikov was banned from entering Ukraine for three years "due to the singer's repeated visits to the annexed Crimea". On 18 April 2022 Ukrainian guards did not let Melnikov into the country.

== Discography ==
=== Studio albums ===
- 2011 — Remote
- 2012 — «Ремонт»
- 2014 — Azbuka Morze
- 2016 — «Наизнанку»
- 2016 — «92 дня»
- 2017 — «Добрая музыка клавиш»
- 2020 — «Парабола»

=== Mini-albums ===
- 2013 — «Чёрточка»
- 2018 — «Какие люди в Голливуде (or called "Oscars" with subtitles)»

=== Singles ===
- 2009 — «За здоровый образ рэпа» (под псевдонимом BthaMoT2bdabot)
- 2009 — «Запах (Вступление)» feat. KOKA beats
- 2010 — «Синий» feat. KOKA beats
- 2011 — «Акуна матата»
- 2013 — «#МотСтелетЧоСели»
- 2013 — «Туса» (feat. Timati, GeeGun & L'One)
- 2013 — Self-Made
- 2013 — Assassin
- 2014 — «Талисман» (feat. Dimaestro)
- 2014 — «Эдем»
- 2014 — «Мама, я в Дубае»
- 2014 — «Рэп из мамы Раши»
- 2014 — «Кислород» (feat. ВИА Гра)
- 2015 — «Молодая кровь 2» (feat. Natan)
- 2016 — «Капкан»
- 2016 — «Муссоны» (feat. Артём Пивоваров)
- 2016 — «В щепки» (& Саша Чест, Timati & Skrudzh)
- 2016 — «На дне»
- 2017 — «Сопрано» (feat. Ani Lorak)
- 2017 — «Далласский клуб злопыхателей»
- 2017 — Yellow Song
- 2017 — «Великий»
- 2017 — «Свадебная»
- 2017 — «Когда исчезнет Слово»
- 2017 — «Ливень» (feat. Артём Пивоваров)
- 2018 — «Соло»
- 2018 — «Муссоны» (& PLC, Nastika & Джей Мар)
- 2018 — «Малая»
- 2018 — «Белые ночи»
- 2018 — «Ракета» (& Timati, Egor Kreed, Skrudzh, Nazima & Terry)
- 2018 — «Шаманы»
- 2018 — «Она не твоя»
- 2018 — «По буквам»
- 2018 — «Над облаками» (& Timati, Egor Kreed, Pabl.A, Skrudzh & Nazima)
- 2019 — «Сколько лет» (feat. Valeriy Meladze)
- 2019 — «Для своих»
- 2019 — «Молодость»
- 2019 — «Как к себе домой»
- 2019 — "Parusa" (with Zivert)
- 2019 — «Перекрестки»
- 2019 — «Сталактит»
- 2019 — «Манекен» (feat. Amchi)
- 2020 — «Тарантино»
- 2020 — «Космос — это синяки»
- 2020 — «Люди»
- 2020 — «Словами с привкусом мёртвого моря...»
- 2020 — «Парабола»
- 2020 — «Бумажный дом»
- 2020 — «Спой» (feat. Misha Marvin)
- 2020 — «Гудки»
- 2020 — «Не любишь (Tribute Ратмир Шишков)» (feat. Доминик Джокер)
- 2020 — «Ковчег»
- 2021 — «Лилии» (feat. JONY)
- 2021 — «Не Бруклин» (feat. LYRIQ)
- 2021 — «Август - это ты»
- 2021 — «10 баллов» (feat. Dose)
- 2021 — «Hotel Rendezvous» (feat. MeMaria)
- 2021 — «Холодно не будет» (feat. Mary Gu)
- 2022 — «По душам»
- 2022 — «Тряпки от кутюр»
- 2022 — «Любовь как спецэффект»
- 2022 — «Снова МОТ стелит»
- 2022 — «Я оставлю» (feat. Grigory Leps)
- 2023 — «Мурашками»
- 2023 — Like l Love You (feat. Amirchik)
- 2023 — Excuse My English (feat. 8Miracle)
- 2023 — «За горизонт» (feat. Artik & Asti)

==== Remixes ====
- 2013 — «В платье красивого цвета» (Space4Sound Remix)
- 2017 — «Когда исчезнет Слово» (Denis Agamirov & Stylezz Remix)
- 2017 — «Когда исчезнет Слово» (DJ OneDollar Remix)
- 2018 — «Соло» (DJ Noiz Remix)
- 2019 — «Паруса» (feat. Zivert) (Alex Shik & Slaving Radio Edit)
- 2020 — «Космос — это синяки» (Alex Shik Remix)
- 2020 — «На юга» (Alex Shik Remix)
- 2020 — «Гудки» (Alex Shik Radio Edit Remix)
- 2020 — «Парабола» (DFM Mix)
- 2020 — «Бумажный дом» (DFM Mix)
- 2020 — «Манекен» (feat. Amchi) (DFM Mix)
- 2020 — «Словами с привкусом мёртвого моря...» (DFM Mix)
- 2021 — «Ковчег» (DFM Mix)
- 2021 — «Любовь как спецэффект» (DFM Mix)
- 2021 — «Не бруклин» (feat. LYRIQ) (DJ Prezzplay Remix)
- 2021 — «По душам» (DFM Mix)
- 2021 — «Август - это ты» (Red Max Remix)
- 2022 — «Hotel Rendezvous» (feat. MeMaria) (DFM Mix)
- 2022 — «Гудки» (DFM Mix)

== Videography ==
Year	Title	Director(s)	Album/Mini-Album
2011	Миллионы звёзд on YouTube	Sergei Zakharov	«Remote»
2012	К берегам on YouTube	Mikhail Mililyan	«Ремонт»
2013	#МотСтелетЧоСели on YouTube	Rustam Romanov	Single
2013	Понедельник-Вторник on YouTube	Alekandr Solomakhin	«Чёрточка»
2013	Туса on YouTube (& Тимати, Джиган & L'One)	Pavel Hoodyakov	Single
2013	В платье красивого цвета on YouTube	Aleksandr Solomakhin	«Ремонт»
2013	Молодая кровь on YouTube (feat. Тимати)	Rustam Romanov	Azbuka Morze
2013	Планета on YouTube (feat. Kristina Si)	Rustam Romanov	«Чёрточка»
2013	#МОТсейчасвклубе on YouTube (OST «Одноклассники.ru: НаCLICKай удачу»)	Rustam Romanov	Azbuka Morze
2014	Страна OZ on YouTube	Aleksandr Solomakhin	Azbuka Morze
2014	Чёрный день on YouTube	Aleksei Bochenin	Azbuka Morze
2014	Талисман on YouTube (feat. Dimaestro)	Aleksei Bochenin	«Акустический эффект»
2014	Бенджамин on YouTube (feat. L'One)	Konstantin Korolev & Evgeny Spivakov	Azbuka Morze
2014	Мама, я в Дубае on YouTube	Rustam Romanov	Single
2014	Рэп из мамы Раши on YouTube	Pavel Torsky	Single
2014	Кислород on YouTube (feat. ВИА Гра)	Aleksei Kypriyanov	Single
2015	День и ночь on YouTube	Rustam Romanov	«92 дня»
2015	Молодая кровь 2 on YouTube (feat. Natan)	Dmitry Valikov	Single
2015	Абсолютно всё on YouTube (feat. Бьянка)	Ekaterina Telegina	«Наизнанку», «Мысли в нотах»
2016	Капкан on YouTube	Katya Yak	«Наизнанку»
2016	Муссоны on YouTube (feat. Артём Пивоваров)	Katya Yak	«Наизнанку»
2016	В щепки on YouTube (& Саша Чест, Тимати & Скруджи)	Zaur Zaseev & Pavel Hoodyakov	Single
2016	92 дня on YouTube	Rustam Romanov	«92 дня»
2016	На дне on YouTube	Zaur Zaseev & Pavel Hoodyakov	«92 дня»
2016	А может?! on YouTube (feat. Миша Марвин)	Rustam Romanov	«92 дня»
2017	Сопрано on YouTube (feat. Ани Лорак)	Zaur Zaseev & Pavel Hoodyakov	«Добрая музыка клавиш»
2017	Далласский клуб злопыхателей on YouTube	Yan Bokhanovich	Single
2017	Найди свою силу on YouTube (& L'One & Тимати)	Pavel Hoodyakov	Single
2017	Yellow Song on YouTube	Katya Yak	Single
2017	Когда исчезнет слово on YouTube	Katya Yak	Single
2017	Звуки пианино on YouTube	Polina Nazareva & Ivan Proskuryakov	«Добрая музыка клавиш»
2018	Соло on YouTube	Yan Bokhanovich	Single
2018	Побег из шоубиза / Пролетая над коттеджами Барвихи on YouTube	Olzhas Bayalbaev	Single
2018	Ракета on YouTube (& Тимати, Егор Крид, Скруджи, Наzима & Terry)	Zaur Zaseev & Pavel Hoodyakov	Single
2018	По буквам on YouTube	Katya Yak	Single
2019	Сколько лет on YouTube (feat. Валерий Меладзе)	Zaur Zaseev & Pavel Hoodyakov	Single
2019	Как к себе домой on YouTube (mood video)	Filipp Valiulin	Single
2019	Молодость on YouTube	Katya Yak	«Неизданное»
2019	Паруса on YouTube (feat. Zivert)	Yaroslav Krotkov	Single
2019	Перекрестки on YouTube	Artem Kiyashko	Single
2020	Гудки on YouTube	Aleksandr Romanov	Single
2021	Лилии on YouTube (feat. JONY)	Aleksei Zhukov	Single
2021	Не Бруклин on YouTube (feat. LYRIQ)	Hanna Bogdan	Single
2021	Август - это ты on YouTube	Filipp Valiulin	Single
2021	Hotel Rendezvous on YouTube (feat. MeMaria)	Unknown	Single
2022	По душам on YouTube (mood video)	Unknown	Single
2022	Любовь как спецэффект on YouTube	Unknown	Single

== Charts ==
Year	Title	Country/Territory (Chart)								Album
Year	Title	CIS (Tophit Total Top-100)	Russia (Tophit Russian Top-100)	Russia (Tophit Moscow Top-100)	Russia (Tophit Saint-Petersburg Top-100)	Ukraine (Tophit Ukrainian Top-100)	Ukraine (Tophit Kiev Топ-100)	Russia & CIS (Tophit Weekly on request)	CIS (Tophit Yearly Totals)	Album
2013	«Понедельник-вторник»	—	—	—	—	—	—	188	—	«Чёрточка — EP»
2013	«В платье красивого цвета»	246	—	—	—	—	—	116	—	Сингл
2014	«Кислород» (feat. VIAGRA)	22	23	32	—	61	26	4	53	Сингл
2015	«День и ночь»	130	—	194	—	—	—	33	—	«92 дня»
2015	«Абсолютно все» (feat. Bianka (singer))	16	16	25	16	30	15	1	155	«Наизнанку»
2016	«Капкан»	52	54	55	53	—	—	89	—	«Наизнанку»
2016	«92 дня»	134	—	162	—	—	194	98	—	«92 дня»
2016	«На дне»	76	94	71	—	—	—	24	—	«92 дня»
2017	«Сопрано» (feat. Ani Lorak)	20	4	2	7	7	3	1	3	«Добрая музыка клавиш»
2017	«Когда исчезнет слово»	158	—	—	—	—	—	—	—	«Добрая музыка клавиш»
2018	«Соло»	82	—	—	—	—	—	—	—	Сингл
2018	«Шаманы»	147	—	—	—	—	—	—	—	Сингл
2019	«Сколько лет» (feat. Valery Meladze)	33	—	42	—	—	—	—	—	Сингл
