= Klava Koka =

Russian singer (born 1995)

Klava Koka Клава Кока
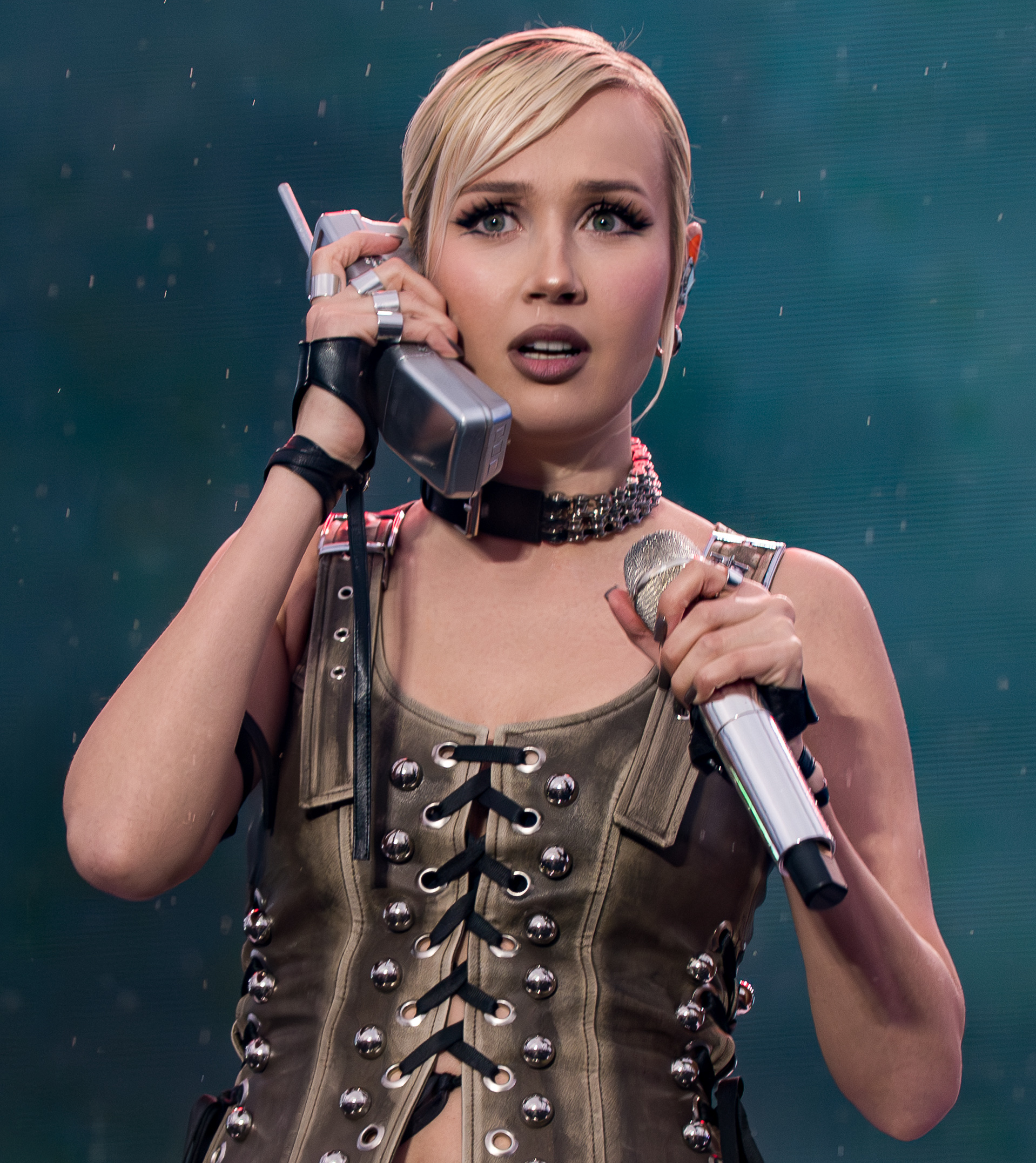
- Klava Koka in 2025

Background information
- Born: Klavdiya Vadimovna Vysokova; 23 July 1995 (age 31); Yekaterinburg, Russia
- Genres: Pop
- Occupations: Singer; songwriter; YouTuber
- Years active: 2015–present
- Label: Black Star

Klavdiya Vadimovna Vysokova (Russian: Клавдия Вадимовна Высокова; born 23 July 1995), known professionally as Klava Koka (Russian: Клава Кока), is a Russian singer, songwriter, and YouTuber. Vysokova began her professional career in 2015, being signed to Russian record label Black Star after winning the casting show Molodaya krov ("Young blood").

== Early life and education ==
Vysokova was born in Yekaterinburg on 23 July 1995. When she was a teenager, she moved with her family to Moscow. After completing her secondary education, Vysokova planned to enroll in the production department at the Gerasimov Institute of Cinematography, but she was one point short of being accepted on a budget, so she enrolled in the Russian Presidential Academy of National Economy and Public Administration to study public service and management.

In 2012 she competed in the singing competition Ya - artist, where she reached the final.

== Career ==
In 2015 Vysokova released her debut studio album Kusto, consisting of country pop songs. That year, she took part in the music competition show Glavnaya Stsena, the third Russian incarnation of The X Factor. In the show, her style of performing was criticized by celebrity mentors Diana Arbenina, Irina Allegrova, Valery Leontiev, and Nikolai Noskov.

Later in 2015, Vysokova competed in the casting show Molodaya krov. She ultimately won, and was signed to Russian label Black Star as part of her prize. In 2017, she launched her YouTube channel, where she began performing covers of foreign songs translated into the Russian language. The following year, she became a host on the travel show Oryol i Reshka.

In 2019 Klava Koka radically changed her image and musical style with the release of the single "Vlyublena v MDK". She subsequently released her second studio album Neprilichno o lichnom later that year. In 2021 Vysokova was included as one of the 30 Most Promising Russians Under 30 by Forbes Russia. Vysokova is also a Russian advertising face of brands such as Pepsi, Garnier, and KitKat.

On 19 July 2025, it was announced that she had become one of the official ambassadors of Intervision 2025.

== Discography ==
=== Studio albums ===
Title	Details
Kusto	Released: 17 March 2015; Format: Digital download
Neprilichno o lichnom	Released: 22 November 2019; Label: Black Star; Format: Digital download
Депрессаунд	Released: 22 November 2024; Label: Black Star; Format: Digital download

=== Singles ===
Title	Year	Peak chart positions	Album
Title	Year	CIS	Album
"May"	2016	180	Non-album singles
"Esli..." (with Olga Buzova)	2016	—	Non-album singles
"Ne otpuskay"	2016	256	Non-album singles
"Tishe"	2016	—	Non-album singles
"Ya ustala"	2017	—	Non-album singles
"Teryayu sebya" (featuring DJ Daveed)	2017	—	Non-album singles
"Netu vremeni"	2017	—	Non-album singles
"Prosti"	2017	—	Non-album singles
"Ya polyubila"	2017	—	Non-album singles
"Murashki"	2017	—	Non-album singles
"Vospominaniye"	2018	—	Non-album singles
"Zaberi menya"	2018	880	Non-album singles
"Tik-tak"	2018	—	Non-album singles
"Ne oblamyvay"	2018	—	Non-album singles
"Stala silneye"	2018	—	Non-album singles
"Krutish"	2018	624	Non-album singles
"Nenavizhu-obozhayu"	2018	—	Non-album singles
"Odinokiy chelovek"	2019	—	Non-album singles
"Devochka-pay" (featuring Timati)	2019	—	Non-album singles
"Fak-YU" (with Lusia Chebotina)	2019	—	Non-album singles
"Grekhi" (with Egor Kreed)	2019	—	Non-album singles
"Vlyublena v MDK"	2019	—	Neprilichno o lichnom
"Zaya"	2019	—	Neprilichno o lichnom
"Zanovo"	2019	—	Non-album single
"Nogi delayut nogi"	2019	—	Neprilichno o lichnom
"Polovina"	2019	—	Neprilichno o lichnom
"Mne pokh" (with Morgenshtern)	2019	—	Neprilichno o lichnom
"Hookah Hunnies" (with Bianca Bonnie and Brooke Lynne)	2019	—	Non-album singles
"Pokinula chat"	2020	25	Non-album singles
"Baby"	2020	—	Non-album singles
"Krash" (with Niletto)	2020	21	Non-album singles
"Khimiya"	2020	—	Non-album singles
"Soshla s uma"	2020	—	Non-album singles
"Kostyor" (with Hensy)	2020	100	Non-album singles
"Pyanuyu domoy"	2020	87	Non-album singles
"Sladkiye malchiki"	2021	—	Non-album singles
"Nokaut" (with Ruki Vverh!)	2021	141	Non-album singles
"Podushka"	2021	—	Non-album singles
"Tochka"	2021	604	Non-album singles
"La La La"	2021	72	Non-album singles
"Derzhi" (with Dima Bilan)	2021	—	Non-album singles
"Katastrofa"	2021	104	Non-album singles
"Khochesh" (with Aleksandr Revva)	2021	346	Non-album singles
"Ya tebya naydu"	2022	—	Mal'chik-Del'fin
"Mama"	2022	—	Mal'chik-Del'fin
"Dumal" (with Soda Luv)	2022	—	Non-album singles
"Bumerang"	2022	—	Non-album singles
"Shkura" (with Mari Kraimbrery)	2022	—	Non-album singles
"Plachesh'"	2022	—	Non-album singles
"Ne so mnoy"	2022	50	Non-album singles
"Rozovaya Luna" (with Dzharakhov, Sqwoz Bab)	2022	—	Non-album singles

== Awards and nominations ==
Year	Award	Category	Nominated work	Result	Ref.
2019	High Five! National Television Awards	Favorite Singer	Herself	Won	
2019	Nickelodeon Kids' Choice Awards	Favorite Russian Music Blogger	Herself	Nominated	
2020	MTV Europe Music Awards	Best Russian Act	Herself	Nominated	
2021	Muz-TV Awards	Best Female Artist	Herself	Nominated	
2021	Muz-TV Awards	Best Female Video	"Pokinula chat"	Nominated	
2021	Muz-TV Awards	Best Collaboration	"Krash" (with Niletto)	Won	
