= Egor Kreed =

Russian singer (born 1994)

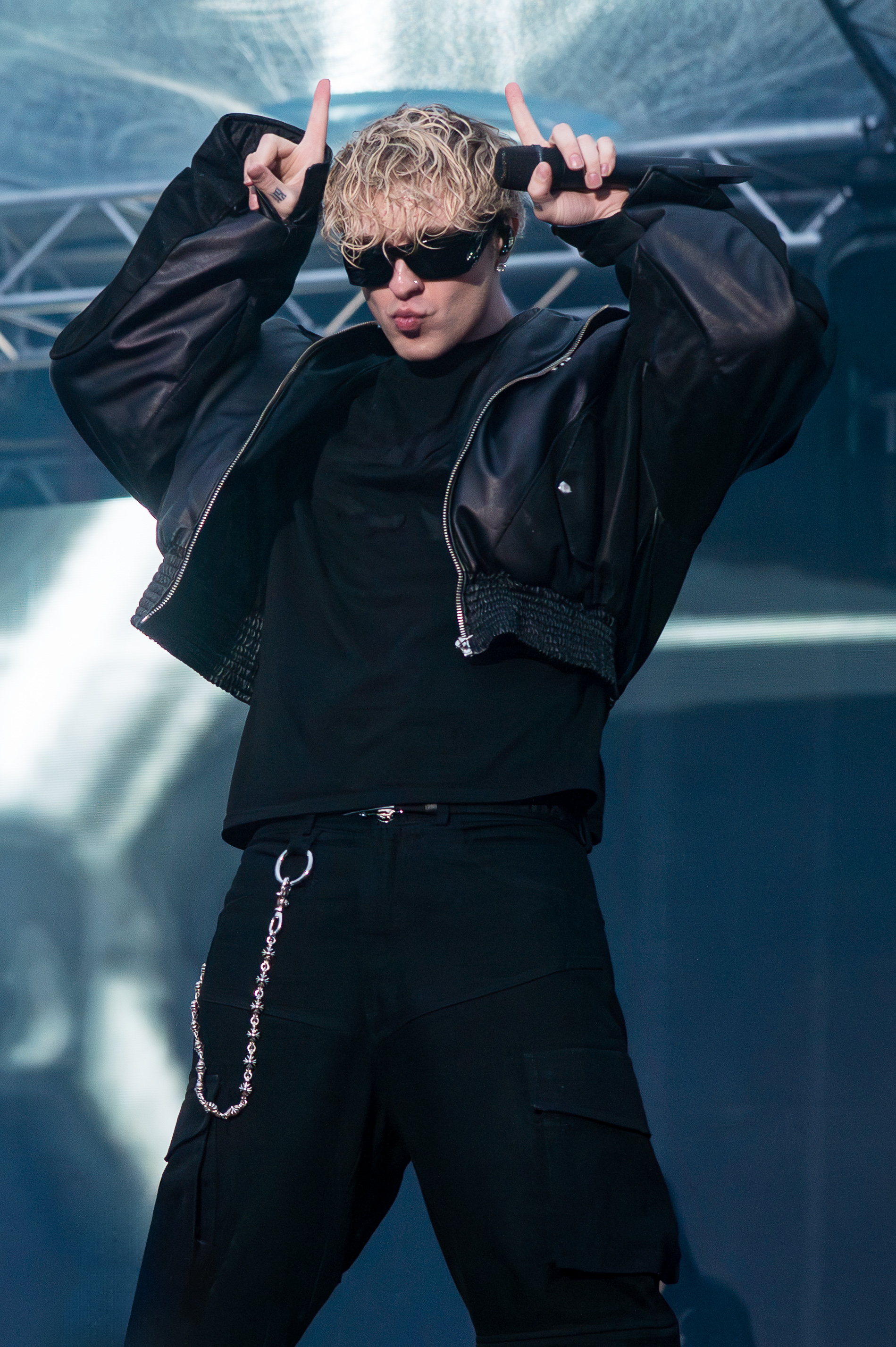
- Egor Kreed in 2025

Background information
- Born: Егор Николаевич Булаткин (Egor Nikolayevich Bulatkin); June 25, 1994 (age 32); Penza, Russia
- Genres: Hip hop, pop, contemporary R&B
- Occupations: Rapper, singer, songwriter, rapper
- Years active: 2011–present
- Labels: Black Star Inc. (2012–2019); Warner Music Russia (2019–present)

Egor Nikolayevich Bulatkin (Russian: Егор Николаевич Булаткин, born June 25, 1994), better known by his stage names Egor Kreed, KReeD, and Egor Split, is a Russian rapper, singer and songwriter. He began his career under his stage name "KReeD" in 2014, but later changed it to "Egor Kreed".

== Career ==
He posted his first song titled "Lyubov v seti" on YouTube in July 2011. The video brought success and recognition from across Russia, racking up millions of views.

In March 2012, Kreed won the "Star Vkontakte – Channel Five" in the category "Best Hip Hop Project". He was chosen from among 1000 other competitors. He earned more than twenty thousand votes and was invited to perform at Saint Petersburg's BKZ "October's", where he performed "Vdokhnovenie" (Inspiration).

He gained millions more YouTube views from the release of a cover version of "Ne skhodi s uma" (Don't go crazy), which Timati originally performed. In April 2012, Kreed signed with Timati's label "Black Star Inc". His debut track was "Starletka" (Starlet) recorded in the spring of 2012. The music video included popular Russian actress and model, Miroslava Karpovich, from the Russian TV series Daddy's Daughters (Papiny Dochki). He appeared at major Moscow venues, including "Olympic", "Luzhniki", "OCE", and "Poklonaya Gora". He also performed at events such as Hip-Hop Unite, May First, City Youth, ELLO Festival, and Euro 2012. In April 2015 Kreed released an album titled Holostyak (The Bachelor).

As of 2018, he had recorded about 60 songs, including "Nado li", "Zavedi moi puls", "Samaya Samaya", "Nevesta", "Rasstoyaniya", "Starletka", "Tolko ty" and "You're my galaxy".

On October 9, 2014, Kreed released his biggest hit "Samaya Samaya", which moved into a more pop genre. It reached number one on the Russian charts and earned over twenty million views on YouTube. In April 2015, he released the song "Nevesta", featuring Anastasia Mikhailyuta and directed by Aleksey Kupriyanov.

On June 21, 2018, Kreed and Timati held an unauthorized mass event in Moscow on Bolshaya Dmitrovka by staging an impromptu performance on the roof of a car, blocking traffic. This promoted the opening of the Timati's beauty salon. The next day, lawyer Alexander Khaminsky filed an application to initiate cases on this incident in the Department of the Ministry of Internal Affairs of Tver and the Moscow State Traffic Safety Inspectorate.

Over the course of his career, Kreed has recorded songs with Timati, Klava Koka, MOLLY, Morgenshtern, Philipp Kirkorov, and others.

He has been on the television show Холостяк (Kholostyak).

== Blogging & Social Media ==
After leaving Black Star, Egor Kreed began to be more active on his channel. On 20 July 2019, the number of subscribers to his channel surpassed 2 million, and in February 2022, his Youtube channel had more than 6 million subscribers.

Egor also has an Instagram page, where he has over 14.7 million subscribers.

== Filmography ==
| Year | Title | Director | Role |
|---|---|---|---|
| 2017 | Hotel Eleon | Maksim Sveshnikov | Cameo (Season 3 Episode 14) |
| 2019 | Zhara | Dunya Lisova | Cameo |
| 2020 | (Ne)idealniy Muzhshina | Maryus Vaysberg | Egor, robot iFriend |

== Discography ==
=== Studio albums ===
- Holostyak (2015)
- Chto oni znayut? (2017)
- 58 (2020)
- Pussy Boy (2021)
- Menshe chem tri (2024)

=== Singles ===
- "The Color of Mood is Black" with Philipp Kirkorov (2018)
- "Gucci" with Timati (2018)
- "Sad Song" with Thrill Pill and Morgenshtern (2019)
- "Карие глаза" featuring Loc-Dog (2020)
- "Rolls Royce" feat. GeeGun & Timati
- "Taro" feat. Tenderlybae & Egorik

=== Music videos ===
| Year | Title | Director | Album |
|---|---|---|---|
| 2011 | "Lyubov V Seti" | --- | – |
| 2012 | "Starletka" | Aleksey Figurov | – |
| 2012 | "Bolshe Chem Lyubov" | Aleksey Figurov | – |
| 2012 | "Rasstoyaniya" | Aleksandr Solomakhin | – |
| 2013 | "Zavedy Moi Puls" | Sergey Grey | – |
| 2014 | "Skromnym Byt Ne V Mode" | Rustam Romanov | – |
| 2014 | "Nado Li" | Aleksey Kupriyanov | Holostyak |
| 2014 | "Samaya Samaya" | Aleksey Kupriyanov | Holostyak |
| 2015 | "Nevesta" | Aleksey Kupriyanov | Holostyak |
| 2015 | "You're My Galaxy" | Sergey Shubin | – |
| 2015 | "Gimn RU.TV" | --- | – |
