= Hensy =

Russian singer (born 1994)

Hensy Хе́нси
- Born: Alexander Olegovich Stratonov; Александр Олегович Стратонов; February 28, 1994 (age 32); Zainsk, Tatarstan, Russia
- Genres: Hip hop; pop
- Occupations: Rapper; Singer; Songwriter

Hensy (Russian: Хе́нси); real name Alexander Olegovich Stratonov (Russian: Александр Олегович Стратонов; born 28 February 1994, Zainsk, Tatarstan, Russia) is a Russian music singer.

== Musical style ==
Music critic Boris Barabanov summed up Hensy's style as "melancholic pop and confessional hip-hop with resemblance to the group 'Zhuki.'"

== Discography ==
=== Studio Albums ===
Title	Details
"TripleTrip"	Release: 6 April 2019; Label: Первое музыкальное издательство; Format: digital distribution
"Жиза"	Release: 2 July 2021; Label: Golden Sound; Format: digital distribution
"Последняя неделя перед..."	Release: 13 May 2022; Label: Golden Sound; Format: digital distribution
"Трудный ребёнок"	Release: 16 September 2022; Label: Gamma Music; Format: digital distribution

=== EPs ===
Title	Details
"Музыка для души"	Release: 13 July 2020; Label: Golden Sound; Format: digital distribution
