= Alexander Khaminsky =

Russian social activist (born 1966)

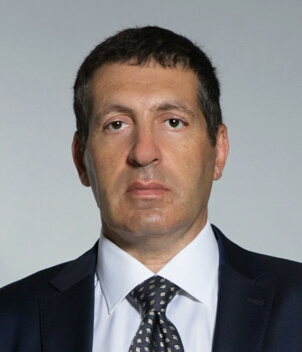
- Born: 30 June 1966 (age 60); Moscow, USSR
- Education: Russian State University of Tourism and Services Studies; Moscow State University; Russian State University for the Humanities
- Occupations: lawyer, social activist, human rights activist

Alexander Mikhailovich Khaminsky (Russian: Алекса́ндр Миха́йлович Хами́нский; born 30 June 1966) is a Russian social activist, lawyer, human rights activist, and health professional.

He is a member of Public Council under the Moscow City Police. He is also a counselor and an expert of several public authorities including the Presidential Council for Civil Society and Human Rights, Civic Chamber of the Russian Federation, Directorate of the Civic Chamber of the Russian Federation, and State Inspection of Assay Supervision in Moscow and Moscow oblast’.

Alexander Khaminsky is a chairman of the non-profit partnership management “Republican Law Society”, founder of the interregional public organization “Republican Consumer Rights Protection Society”, founder and leader of the joint-stock company «Scientific Diagnostic Center of Clinical Psychiatry», founder of the regional public organization “Moscow Society of Psychiatrists”, chief editor of the magazine “Moscow – Tel-Aviv”, publisher and chief editor of the magazine “AH!”, member of “Congress-collegium”.

In addition to professional activities, he is involved in charity work and sports, and promotes a healthy lifestyle.

In the mass media, he serves as an expert and specialist in law, security, psychiatry, psychology, social policy and interethnic relations.

== Biography ==
Alexander was born on 30 June 1966 in Moscow into a family of non-manual workers.

He has three university degrees: technic education (Russian State University of Tourism and Services Studies), commercial education (Moscow State University) and legal education (Russian State University for the Humanities). He underwent an advanced training in the organization of health care and management of medical institutions.

From 1988 to 1992 he carried out business activities in consumer good industry (Moscow Regional House of Models, joint Soviet-Swiss enterprise “Interexpression”, small enterprise “Khars”. In June 1991, “Moskovskaya Pravda” compared the production volumes of Khaminsky’s enterprise with similar indicators of large garment factories.

Since 1992, he works in the field of financial, arbitration, administrative and criminal law. From 1995 to 1999 he was a parliamentary assistant of Kobylkin V.F., the State Duma Deputy.

Since 2008, he is engaged in journalistic activities, and since 2015, he is engaged in editing and publishing.

Alexander Khaminsky is a constant speaker of the social and political programs of the Channel One Russia, TV and radio company “Mir”, Moscow 24, 360° Podmoskovie, NTV, REN TV channels, Kommersant FM radio station, he writes columns in news and professional media, such as FederPress, Dni.ru, Clerk.ru and others.

He is an expert on the following issues: the bankruptcy of Transaero Airlines, the bankruptcy of individuals in Russia, the conflict due to the division of property during the divorce process of Fyodor and Svetlana Bondarchuk, the violations of the Highway Rules by representatives of the so-called "golden youth", the initiation of criminal cases against the leaders of the TFR in 2016, the practice of using forced labor in Russia as a criminal sanction, the decriminalization of the article on beatings in the Criminal Code of the Russian Federation, the ban of Russian on travel to Egypt and Turkey, the psychological health of the nation, computer and Internet addiction, the attack on the Moscow Choral Synagogue in October 2016 and others.

In 2015, Alexander Khaminsky took the role of outside editor, and in 2016 he was appointed the chief editor of the first Jewish glossy magazine “Moscow – Tel-Aviv”. Since 2016, Alexander Khaminsky is a publisher and chief editor of the glossy magazine “AH!”.

== Social activity ==
Alexander Khaminsky is engaged in public activities, he is an expert and counselor to public authorities. He supports bilateral cooperation between state authorities and civil society institutions.

He participates in the life of the Moscow Jewish community in conjunction with the Federation of Jewish Communities of Russia, the Congress of the Jewish Religious Organizations and Associations in Russia, the Youth Movement "Shahar", the Euro-Asian Jewish Congress and the Russian Council of Muftis.

He is the head of the project "Moscow is the territory of the law", aimed at ensuring interaction between public authorities and civil society institutions.

Since 2017, he is a member of Public Council under the Main Department of Internal Affairs of the city of Moscow. He participates in different public events as a public watchdog. Khaminsky’s project aimed at reducing the level of protest vote during presidential election in 2018 was approved by the Management of the Presidential Administration for Internal Policy.

Since 2018, he is an expert on legal and public health issues of the Presidential Council for Civil Society and Human Rights. He spoke at Council meetings dedicated to the issues of public drug supply and improvement of procedural legislation.

== Public position ==
Alexander Khaminsky criticizes representatives of the non-parliamentary political opposition and, in particular, Alexei Navalny. He spoke in support of Vladimir Putin during public debates with Andrei Nechaev, Nikolai Svanidze and Valery Solovei held on the eve of presidential election in 2018.

== Charity work ==
Alexander Khaminsky does charity work and promotes volunteering. He donates his funds to organize charitable and cultural events.

On a regular basis, he cooperates with charitable foundations including “Downside Up”, Gosha Kutsenko’s “Step together”, with volunteer organizations such as “Asia Co” and “Alabai 911”, participates in charitable auctions and concerts, and organizes such events in cooperation with famous sportsmen Konstantin Tszyu, Dmitry Sennikov, Daniil Kvyat and others.

== Jurisprudence ==
Alexander Khaminsky represents the interests of state and judicial authorities’ constituents. He participates in drawing up and writing methodical manuals, draft regulations, certificates and conclusions on legal issues for mentioned authorities. His clients include Mercury, Polymetal International, TsUM, SU-155, MNIIRE Altair, Microgen, Panasonic and others.

Since 1992, a separate unit "Hars Consulting" has been allocated in enterprise "Khars" structure in order to provide services in the field of tax optimization. Two years later, in 1994, he collected an auditor's certificate and began to carry out auditing activities. Since 1996, he has been specializing in tax law and arbitration proceedings. In 1998-2001 Alexander Khaminsky consulted on bankruptcy issues, and also was integral to the bankruptcy proceedings of commercial banks and manufacturing enterprises.

In 2002, he initiated the establishment of the Republican Legal Society and was elected chairman of its management board. In 2004-2005, employees of this society took part in the reorganization of medical institutions of RAMS, the creation of the Scientific Center of Neurology and the Scientific Center of Immunology of RAMS. In 2007, the Republican Legal Society provided free assistance in the technical equipment of the Central Internal Affairs Directorate in Moscow.

In 2008-2011, Alexander Khaminsky coordinated activities of the Public Reception Office of the Federal Service for Consumer Rights Protection in Moscow.

Alexander Khaminsky introduced a number of motions on legislative initiatives to President Vladimir Putin, the government of the Russian Federation, the Federation Council and Senator Elena Mizulina (to create the State Information Agency and the State Agency for Legal Aid, to integrate the civil partnership in the civil legislation, to decriminalize the Criminal Code of Russia, to systematize the terminology used in various branches of law, and other).

== Psychiatry ==
In 2010, Khaminsky’s funds were used to establish the Scientific Diagnostic Center of Clinical Psychiatry, a non-governmental medical psychiatric institution that carries out, in addition to diagnosing and treating psychiatric disorders, scientific activity, psychiatric examination and forensic psychiatric analysis. Since foundation, Khaminsky has been Chairman of the Board of Directors of the Center, and since 2013, he has been CEO.

Since 2013, the Center examines citizens in order to find the indications for sex-change operations.

In 2015, during XVI Congress of the Russian Society of Psychiatrists in Kazan, five reports, written by Alexander Khaminsky, were presented. These reports were written coauthored with physicians and researchers of the Center for genetic factors influence, evaluation of electroencephalography (spectral and coherent analysis) results on the dynamics of development of mental disorders, methods of treatment the early childhood schizophrenia.

In 2015, the Institute of Psychotherapy and Clinical Psychology, together with the Center, conducted the first All-Russian scientific and practical conference "Actual issues of cognitive psychotherapy, neurology and psychiatry". At the opening of this conference Alexander Khaminsky, the chairman of the organizing committee of the forum, made a report on the organization of interaction of specialists in various fields during diagnosis and treatment of diseases of the cognitive sphere.

== Awards ==
- Letter of gratitude from the Center of Professional Training of the Main Directorate of the MOI of Russia in Moscow (2017)
- Recognition Certificate from the Head of the Ministry of Internal Affairs in Moscow (2017) — For help and assistance to internal affairs bodies in ensuring law and order, public security and combating crime, as well as increasing the prestige of internal affairs bodies
- Honorable Mention from the Head of the Ministry of Internal Affairs in Moscow (2018)
- Letter of gratitude from the President of the Federation of Jewish Communities of Russia (2018)

== Bibliography ==
- Государственное регулирование оборота изделий из драгоценных металлов и драгоценных камней. Ответственность за правонарушения в сфере обращения ювелирных изделий. Москва: Медиа Академия. 2009. ISBN 978-5-903798-07-0.
- Актуальные вопросы психиатрии, неврологии и психотерапии: Сборник научных трудов, посвященный 5-летию НДЦ клинической психиатрии (300 экз ed.). Москва: Перо. 2015. ISBN 978-5-906835-10-9.
- Пейсбук (3000 экз ed.). Москва: Перо. 2016. ISBN 978-5-906871-88-6.
- Выявление и профилактика правонарушений в сфере общественного питания (1000 экз ed.). Москва: Перо. 2016. ISBN 978-5-00122-120-3.
- Правовые и психологические аспекты работы сотрудников правоохранительных и иных государственных органов на массовых мероприятиях. Москва: Перо. 2018. ISBN 978-5-00122-120-3.
