= Natan (singer) =

Russian singer (born 1986)

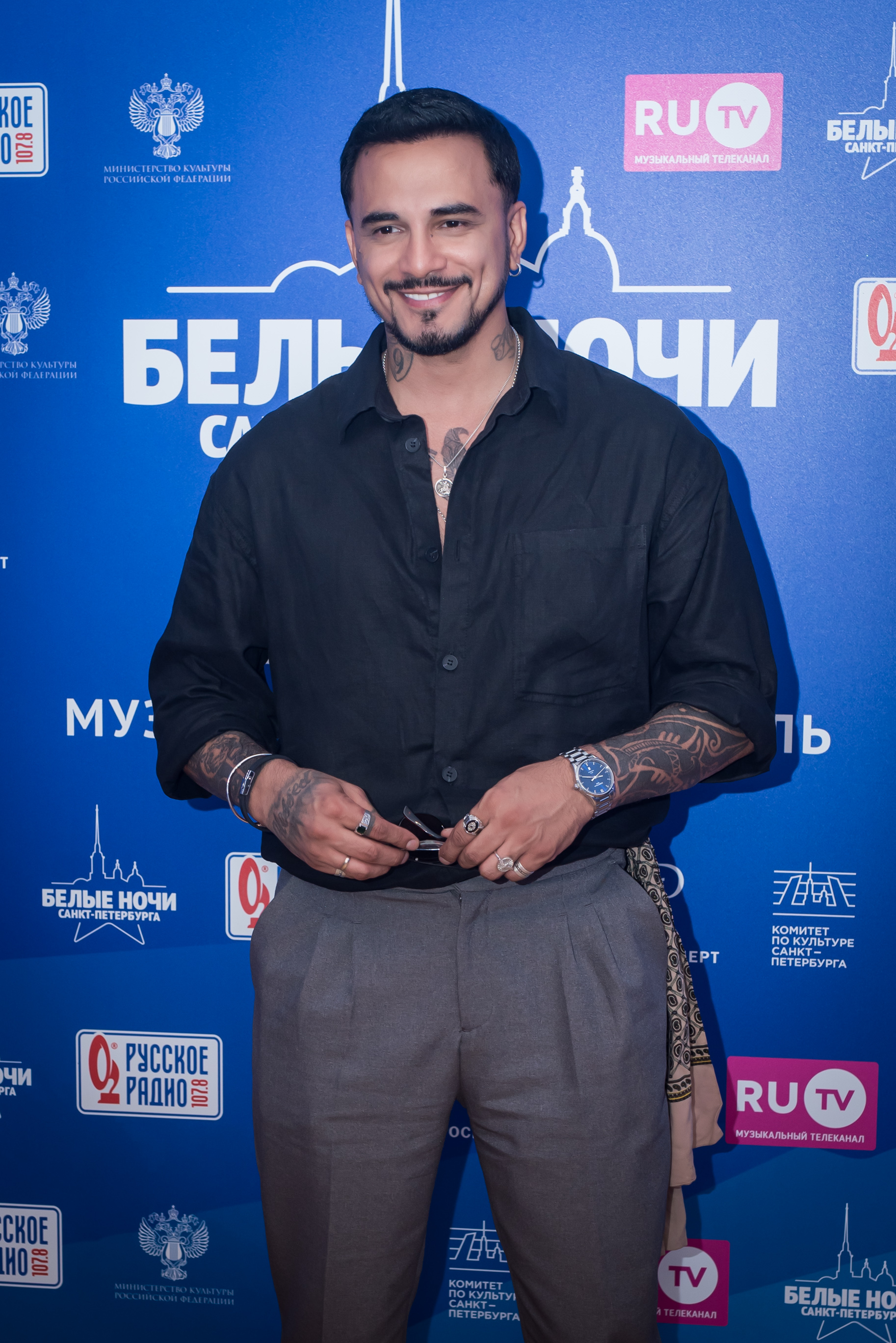
- Natan in 2023

Background information
- Born: Natan Mirov; 17 March 1986 (age 40); Bokhtar, Tajik Soviet Socialist Republic
- Genres: Hip hop
- Occupation: Rapper
- Label: Black Star

Natan Mirov (Russian: Ната́н Ми́ров; born 17 March 1986, Bokhtar, TSSR, USSR), better known as Natan, is a Russian rapper & TV presenter, signed to the label Black Star.

== Biography ==
Natan Mirov was born on 17 March 1986 in Bokhtar, Tajikistan. Natan's father is a doctor, and his mother is a teacher.

At 13 years old (in 1999), he made his first steps in his music career, joining the alma-atina group «Синдикат». In 2003, the group released their debut album.

External videos
- • «Аллилуйя» (2013)

On 11 March 2014, a song with Timati was released, titled «Девочка бомба».

External videos
- • «Дерзкая» (2015) • «Наверно» (2015) • «Нежно-грубо» (2018) on «YouTube»

Natan achieved wide fame in 2015 with the song «Дерзкая». Also featuring Timati, it climbed to the top of the Russian charts.

== Personal life ==
In 2012 Natan married designer Anastasia Shvetzova. Soon after, the couple's son, who is also named Natan, was born. After winning the show «Молодая кровь», he moved with his wife and child to Moscow, but at the same time he was succeeding and therefore had to keep his marital status secret from fans, maintaining the image of a "bachelor".

== Discography ==
=== Album ===
Title	Details
«9»	Release: 13 June 2019; Label: Black Star Inc.; Format: digital distribution

== Videography ==
Year	Title	Director(s)	Albums/EP
2013	«Аллилуйя»	Aleksandr Solomakhin	Single
2013	«Новая жизнь»	Unknown	Single
2014	«Девочка бомба» (feat. Timati)	Unknown	Single
2014	«Часть меня» (feat. DJ Kan)	Aleksey Belov	Single
2014	«Просто история» (live video)	Unknown	Single
2015	«Дерзкая» (feat. Timati)	Unknown	Single
2015	«Наверно» (feat. Elena Temnikova)	Aleksey Kupriyanov	Single
2015	«Молодая кровь 2» (feat. Mot)	Dmitry Valikov	Single
2016	«Я тебя выберу»	Evgeny Nikitin	Single
2017	«Пахнет сексом»	Artemiy Ortus & Ani Malifitzkaya	Single
2017	«Этим летом» (mood video)	N/A	Single
2017	«Я хочу быть с ней»	Katya Yak	Single
2017	«Гипнотайз»	Ani Malifitzkaya	Single
2017	«Номер на двоих» (mood video)	N/A	Single
2018	«Нежно-грубо»	Rustam Romanov	Single
2018	«Покажи мне любовь»	Unknown	9
2018	«Моя» (feat. Doni)	Unknown	Single
2019	«Довела»	Serghey Grey	Single
2019	«Напомни имя» (feat. MBAND)	Aleksandr Romanov	9
2019	«Тратить»	Serghey Grey	9
2019	«Понравился тебе» (feat. ARS-N)	Clip removed from channel	Single
2019	«Холостой»	Rustam Romanov	Single
2020	«Ананасовый сироп» (feat. Ганвест)	Dmitriy Klimov	Single
2020	«ВАУ» (feat. Ганвест)	N/A	Single
2021	«Impala» (mood video)	Mark	Single
2021	«Жара» (feat. Oweek) [mood video]	Unknown	Single
2022	«Мама не скучай» (feat. Пицца) [mood video]	Aleksey Zhidkovskiy	Single
2022	«Хабиби» (feat. Сосо Павлиашвили)	Olga Strelnilkova	Single
Участие у других исполнителей
2019	«Полтора корейца» (clip of TSOY & Айкью)	Sol Godman	Single

== Awards and nominations ==
Year	Organization	Nomination	Nominee / Nominated work	Results	Ref.
2016	Премия RU.TV 2016	«Лучший дуэт» (Best Duet)	Natan feat. Elena Temnikova — «Наверно»	Nominated	
2017	Muz-TV Awards	Хип-хоп проект года (Hip-Hop artist of the year)	Natan	Nominated	
2018	Премия «Прорыв года 2018» of the journal «MODA topical»	Top-hit	Natan	Won	
2018	ZD Awards 2018	Sexy M.	Natan	Nominated	
