= Basta (rapper) =

Russian rapper (born 1980)

Basta Баста
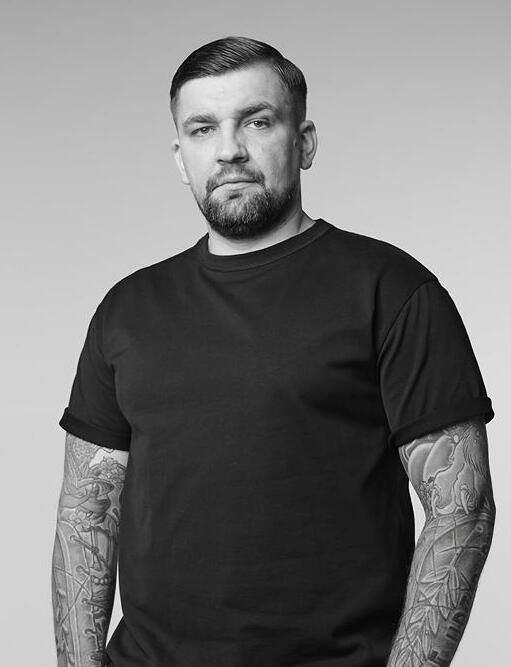

Background information
- Also known as: Noggano; Basta Bastilio
- Born: Vasiliy Mikhaylovich Vakulenko; April 20, 1980 (age 46); Rostov-on-Don, Russian SFSR, Soviet Union
- Genres: Hip-hop, rap
- Occupations: Rapper, producer, radio host, singer
- Years active: 1997–present
- Label: Gazgolder Records
- Website: www.gazgolder.com

Basta (born Vasiliy Mikhaylovich Vakulenko; Russian: Василий Михайлович Вакуленко; April 20, 1980), also known by the stage name Noggano, is a Russian rapper, singer, producer, and radio host.

In 2017, he was banned from entering Ukraine for three years after performing in Crimea following the 2014 Russian annexation of the region.

In January 2023, Ukraine imposed sanctions on him for publicly supporting the 2022 Russian invasion of Ukraine.

== Biography ==
Basta's father was an army officer who served in the Armed Forces of Belarus (then part of the Soviet Union) during the 1980s. He studied at a local music college but did not graduate.

He began writing rap songs at the age of 15–16. In 1997, he joined the rap group Psycholyric, which he later renamed Kasta. In 1998, he recorded his first solo single, Моя Игра (Moya Igra; "My Game"). Subsequently, he formed his own band, Уличные Звуки (Ulichnye Zvuki; "Street Sounds"). In 2004, he was noticed by Bogdan Titomir, who invited him to Moscow. There, Basta met performers Smoky Mo and Guf (later the founder of Centr). He participated in the recording of Guf's album Город дорог (Gorod Dorog; "City of Roads") and collaborated with him on a new version of his debut single Моя Игра.

In 2008, Basta adopted the stage name "Noggano", a reference to the Nagant M1895 revolver. Under this persona, he released two albums: Ноггано первый (Noggano: The First) and Ноггано тёплый (Noggano Warm). He described "Noggano" as his alter ego, rebranding himself as a gangsta rapper.

In 2006, Basta and business partner Evgeny Antimoniy founded the company Gazgolder. The company follows a multi-brand strategy and operates as a record label, nightclub, production company, management agency, and talent agency. It also manages various retail businesses, including clothing stores, pubs, restaurants, vape shops, and a jewelry retailer.

In October 2019, Basta became the owner of FC SKA Rostov-on-Don. Together with Rostec, he contributed to the restoration of the club.

== Personal life ==
Basta is married and has two children.

== Discography ==
=== Albums ===
- 2006 – Баста 1 (Basta 1)
- 2007 – Баста 2 (Basta 2)
- 2008 – Ноггано. Первый (Noggano: The First)
- 2009 – Ноггано. Второй (Тёплый) (Noggano: The Second (Warm))
- 2010 – Баста 3 (Basta 3)
- 2010 – Баста/Guf (Basta/Guf)
- 2011 – N1nt3nd0
- 2011 – ГлаZ (GlaZ / "Eye")
- 2013 – Баста 4 (Basta 4)
- 2014 – ТВА
- 2015 – Баста/Смоки Мо (Basta/Smoky Mo)
- 2016 – Баста 5 (Basta 5)
- 2016 – Лакшери (Luxury)
- 2019 – Папа на рейве (Papa na reive / "Daddy at the Rave")
- 2020 – Gorilla Zippo, Vol. 1
- 2020 – Basta 40
- 2020 – Не три (Ne tri / "Do Not Swipe")
- 2022 – Палец на отсечение (Palets na otsechenie / "Finger for Amputation")
- 2026 – Баста/Guf 2026 (Basta/Guf 2026)

=== Compilations ===
- 1997 – Первый удар (Pervyy udar / "First Strike", with Psycholyric)
- 2005 – Начальное творчество. Часть 1 (Nachal'noye tvorchestvo. Chast' 1 / "Early Works, Part 1")
- 2005 – Баста. Начальное творчество. Часть 1 (Basta. Nachal'noye tvorchestvo. Chast' 1 / "Basta: Early Works, Part 1")
- 2008 – К тебе (K tebe / "To You")
- 2009 – Ноггано: Неизданное (Noggano: Neizdannoye / "Noggano: Unreleased")
- 2010 – Ноггано: Совместки (Noggano: Sovmestki / "Noggano: Collaborations")
- 2013 – Баста + (Basta +)

=== Singles ===
- 1997 – Город (Gorod / "City")
- 2006 – Мама (Mama / "Mother")
- 2006 – Так плачет весна (Tak plachet vesna / "That's How Spring Cries")
- 2006 – Раз и навсегда (Raz i navsegda / "Once and for All")
- 2006 – Сам по себе (Sam po sebe / "By Oneself")
- 2006 – Девочка-суицид (Devochka-suitsid / "Suicide Girl")
- 2006 – Ты та, что (Ty ta, chto / "You're the One Who…")
- 2006 – Осень (Osen' / "Autumn")
- 2006 – Мои мечты (Moi mechty / "My Dreams")
- 2006 – Моя игра (Moya igra / "My Game")
- 2007 – Мне нужен бит (Mne nuzhen bit / "I Need a Beat")
- 2007 – Чувства (Chuvstva / "Feelings")
- 2007 – Война (Voyna / "War")
- 2007 – Город дорог (Gorod dorog / "City of Roads", feat. Guf)
- 2007 – Всем берегам (Vsem beregam / "To All Shores", feat. Centr)
- 2008 – Наше лето (Nashe leto / "Our Summer", feat. MakSim)
- 2009 – Не всё потеряно (Ne vsyo poteryano / "All Is Not Lost", feat. Guf)
- 2009 – Ростов (Rostov / Rostov-on-Don)
- 2010 – Нет такой, как ты (Net takoy, kak ty / "No One Like You")
- 2010 – Обернись (Obernis' / "Turn Around", feat. Gorod 312)
- 2010 – Солнца не видно (Solntsa ne vidno / "No Sun in Sight", feat. BoomBox)
- 2010 – Любовь без памяти (Lyubov' bez pamyati / "Love Without Memory")
- 2010 – Hands Up
- 2010 – Урбан (Urban)
- 2010 – Деньги (Den'gi / "Money")
- 2010 – Олимпиада 80 (Olimpiada 80 / 1980 Summer Olympics)
- 2010 – Кинолента (Kinolenta / "Film Reel")
- 2010 – Россия (Rossiya / "Russia")
- 2010 – Свобода (Svoboda / "Freedom")
- 2010 – Театр (Teatr / "Theatre")
- 2010 – Ходим по краю (Khodim po krayu / "Walking on the Edge", feat. Guf)
- 2010 – Отпускаю (Otpuskayu / "Letting Go")
- 2010 – Тёмная ночь (Tyomnaya noch' / "Dark Night")
- 2012 – Моя вселенная (Moya vselennaya / "My Universe", feat. Tati)
- 2013 – Intro Basta 4
- 2013 – ЧК (Чистый кайф) (ChK / Chistyy kayf / "Pure Pleasure")
- 2014 – Супергерой (Supergeroy / "Superhero")
- 2014 – Моё кино (Moyo kino / "My Cinema")
- 2014 – Приглашение в Зелёный театр (Priglashenie v Zelyony teatr / "Invitation to the Green Theater", feat. Smoky Mo and Tati)
- 2014 – Евпатория (Yevpatoria, Lyapis Trubetskoy cover)
- 2014 – Каменные цветы (Kamennye tsvety / "Stone Flowers", feat. Elena Vaenga and Smoky Mo)
- 2014 – Старая школа (Staraya shkola / "Old School", feat. Smoky Mo)
- 2015 – Хочу к тебе (Khochu k tebe / "I Want to Be with You", feat. Tati)
- 2015 – Скрипка Страдивари (Skripka Stradivari / "Stradivari's Violin")
- 2015 – Нас не нужно жалеть (Nas ne nuzhno zhalet' / "Do Not Pity Us")
- 2015 – Финальный матч (Finalny match / "The Final Match", feat. Smoky Mo; official Match TV anthem)
- 2015 – Там, где нас нет (Tam, gde nas net / "Where We Are Not")
- 2016 – Я смотрю на небо (Ya smotryu na nebo / "I Look at the Sky")
- 2016 – Слон (Slon / "Elephant", feat. Aglaya Shilovskaya)
- 2016 – Голос (Golos / "The Voice", feat. Polina Gagarina)
- 2016 – I Just Live My Life (feat. Cvpellv)
- 2016 – Выпускной. Медлячок (Vypusknoy. Medlyachok / "Graduation. Slow Dance")
- 2016 – Приглашение на фестиваль Gazgolder Live (Priglashenie na festival Gazgolder Live / "Invitation to Gazgolder Live Festival", feat. Dasha Charusha)
- 2016 – Родная (Rodnaya / "Darling", Kalinov Most cover)
- 2016 – Ангел веры (Angel very / "Angel of Faith", feat. Polina Gagarina)
- 2017 – Мастер и Маргарита (Master i Margarita / "The Master and Margarita", feat. Yuna)
- 2017 – Сансара (Sansara / "Saṃsāra", feat. Diana Arbenina, Alexander F. Sklyar, Skriptonit, Ant 25/17, Sergey Bobunets & SunSay)
- 2017 – Папа What's Up (Papa What's Up)
- 2020 – Неболей (Neboley, feat. Zivert)
