= Anet Sai =

Russian singer (born 1997)

Anet Sai Анeт Сай
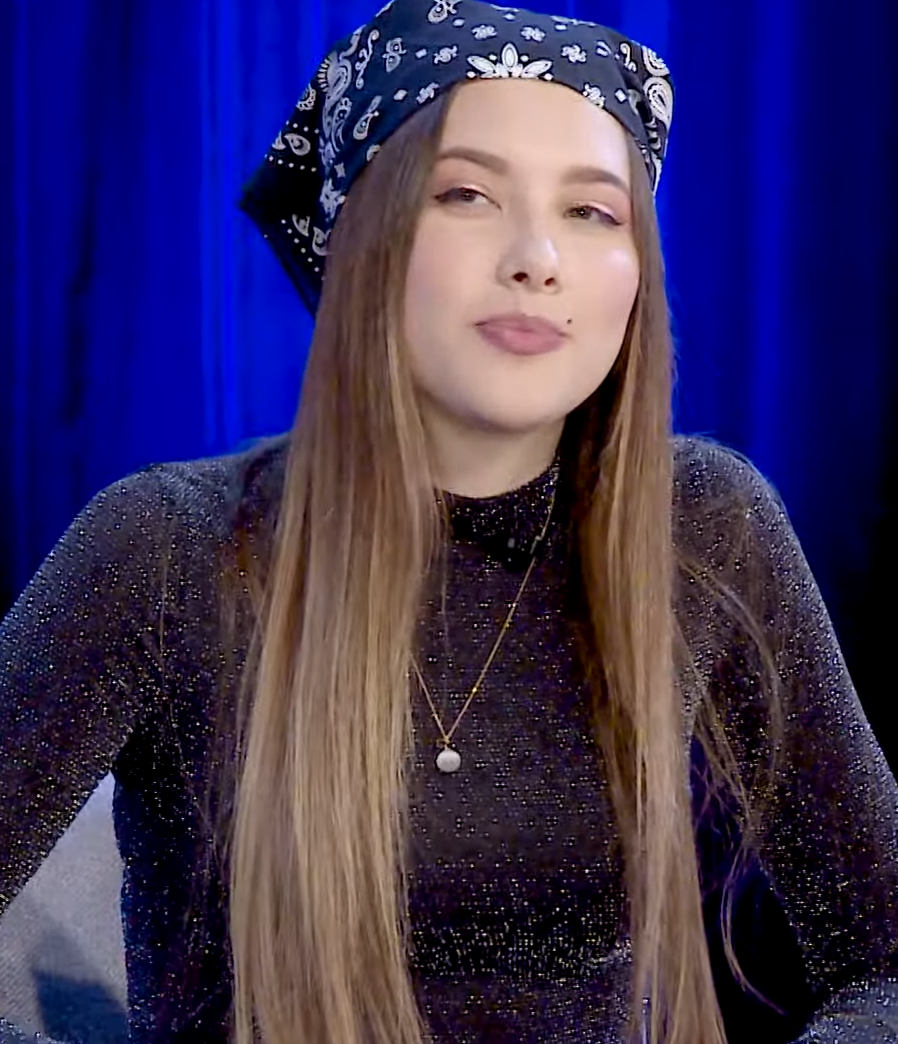

Background information
- Born: Anna Vyacheslavovna Saidalieva (Russia: А́нна Вячеславовна Сайдали́ева); August 10, 1997 (age 29); Volgodonsk, Russia
- Genres: Pop
- Occupation: Singer-songwriter
- Label: Black Star

Anna Vyacheslavovna Saidalieva (Russian: А́нна Вячеславовна Сайдали́ева; born 10 August 1997, Volgodonsk), better known as Anet Sai, is a Russian singer-songwriter, previously being signed to the label Black Star.

== Biography ==
She was born on 10 August 1997 in Rostov Oblast, in the city of Volgodonsk.

She gave two solo concerts in Moscow., for organizations which she worked for.

== Discography ==
=== Albums ===
Title	Details
«Ч.2. Любовь-EP»	Release: 27 October 2021; Label: Black Star Inc.; Format: digital distribution
«Ч.3. Любовь-EP»	Release: 17 November 2021; Label: Black Star Inc.; Format: digital distribution
«Любовь. Слезы. Движ.»	Release: 17 November 2021; Label: Black Star Inc.; Format: digital distribution

=== Singles ===
Year	Title	Charts				Details
Year	Title	CIS			RU	Details
Year	Title	TopHit Top Radio & YouTube Hits	TopHit Top Radio Hits	TopHit Top YouTube Hits	Apple Music Top-10	Details
2019	«Ты прекрасен»					digital single, Released 10 Mar. 2019
2019	«Дыши» (Anet Sai & AMCHI)	—	—	—	—	digital single, released 5 May. 2019
2019	«Не опусти»	—	—	—	—	digital single, released 26 Jun. 2019
2019	«Фотографируй глазами»	—	—	—	—	digital single, released 2 Aug. 2019
2019	«Вызывай счастье»					digital single, released 26 Sep. 2019
2019	«Не моя правда»					digital single, released 19 Nov. 2019
2019	«Небо пополам»					digital single, released 19 Dec. 2019
2020	«Проблемы»					digital single, released 18 Mar. 2020
2020	«Дотронься умом»					digital single, released 15 Jun. 2020
2020	«Мотылёк»					digital single, released 10 Jul. 2020
2020	«Слёзы» (OST «Пацанки»)	32	78	9	6	digital single, released 22 Sep. 2020
2020	«Не реви»					digital single, released 16 Dec. 2020
2021	«Не люблю?» (Anet Sai & Niletto)	28	52	24	—	digital single, released 3 Mar. 2021
2021	«Передружба»					digital single, released 26 May. 2021
2021	«Выходи» (NLO & Anet Sai)					digital single, released 16 Jul. 2021
2021	«Лавина/Цунами» (HENSY & Anet Sai)					digital single, released 28 Jul. 2021
2021	«Созвездие» (Anet Sai & Slame)					digital single, released 2 Sep. 2021
2021	«Все не так» (Vanya Dmitrienko & Anet Sai)					digital single, released 6 Oct. 2021
2022	«И теперь прорвермся»					digital single, released 6 Apr. 2022
2022	«Грустные глаза» (baur karbon & Anet Sai)					digital single, released 12 May 2022
2022	«Разбуди»					digital single, released 16 Jun. 2022
2022	«Медляк» (Anet Sai & Galibri &amp; Mavik)					digital single, released 24 Aug. 2022
2022	«Невеста»					digital single, released 23 Sep. 2022

== Awards and nominations ==
Year	Award	Category	Results	Refs.
2019	Best Blogger Awards	Portal selection Popcake	Won	
2019	European Beauty & Health Award Aurora 2019	Best start	Won	
