= Gazgolder =

Russian record label

- Founded: 2005; 21 years ago
- Founder: Vasily Vakulenko, Evgeny Antimoniy
- Genre: pop; hip hop; rap; trap; rock
- Country of origin: Russia

Gazgolder (also Creative Association "Gazgolder"; Russian: "Газгольдер") is a Russian record label, club, production center and agency for artist production and management. It produces music, video, and film products, organizes concerts, festivals, spectacles, exhibitions and other cultural events. The owners are Vasily Vakulenko and Evgeny Antimoniy.

== History ==
In 2007, Basta became a co-owner of the music label "Gazgolder".

In February 2014, the rapper Скриптонит joined the label.

On 24 April 2014, a full-length film was released called "Gazgolder", collecting 37 million rubles in the first week of screenings.

In February 2016, in the "Gazgolder" club a private screening of the film "Ке-ды" by director Sergei Solovyov was shown, in which Vakulenko was depicted as a military officer.

In September 2016, the singer Tati left Gazgolder and began a solo career.

The next festival, Gazgolder Live, occurred on 21 July 2017. The festival featured not only label members Basta, Smoky Mo, Skryptonite, T-Fest, Slovetsky & Sasha Chest, but also ATL, Husky, MiyaGi &amp; Endshpiel, Jillzay and Cvpellv.

On 11 August new members of "Gazgolder" were revealed on the YouTube video "Айловаю" — the group MODI from Nizhny Novgorod. Their work combines trap-soul, funk, R&B, rap, pop music and new wave. At the end of the year another singer, Matrang, joined the association.

== Personnel ==
- Nikolai Duksin — director of the production center, label, concert director for Basta
- Natalya Mostakova — PR-director
- Dmitriy Milovzorov — SMM-director
- Igor Klimov — Concert director

== List of Members/Associations ==
=== Current members ===
- Олег Груз (since 2005)
- Vasily Vakulenko (since 2005)
  - Basta
  - Noggano
  - N1NT3ND0
  - Gorilla Zippo
- QП aka КРП aka Купэ (since 2005)
- Slovetsky (since 2012)
- Вадяра Блюз (since 2018)
- Lucaveros (since 2019)
- Тридцать три обещания (since 2024)
- Первый Опыт (since 2023)
- Lumpius (since 2024)
- Mutxntik (since 2024)
- Anikv (since 2019)
- Straniza (since 2019)
- Минаева (since 2019)
- Контаев (since 2020)
- Mika Vino (since 2021)
- DoppDopp (since 2021)
- Zapravka (since 2021)
- Гранж (since 2021)
- Ваня Кургалин (since 2022)
- Kristina Si (since 2022)
- Baho Khabi (since 2022)
- Baby Cute (since 2024)
- The OM (since 2024)
- OBLADAET (since 2020)
- ICEGERGERT (since 2024)

=== Former members ===
- DJ Tactics (2010)
- Umbrella (2010)
- Guf (2009–2013)
- Пика (2010–2013)
- Tati (2005–2016)
- "АК-47" (2009–2016)
  - Витя АК
  - Максим АК
- "Триагрутрика" (2011—2016)
  - Jahmal
  - Vibe
  - Ingushit aka Big Mic
  - DJ Puza aka MC Пузырь
- "Нервы" (2015–2017)
  - Женя Мильковский
  - Roman Bulakhov
  - Дмитро Дудка
  - Алексей Бочкарёв
- Tony Tonite (2014–2017)
- Эра Канн (2016–2017)
- Lil Dik (2016–2017)
- Charusha (2015–2018)
- Lil Kate (2016–2018)
- Саша Чест (2017–2018)
- Modi (2017–2018)
- Bratia Stereo (2011–2018)
- Skryptonite (2013–2018)
- Smoky Мо (2005–2020)
- Tritia (2019–2021)
- T-Fest (2017–2022)
- ODI (2021–2022)
- MATRANG (2017–2024)
