= Black Star (record label) =

Russian record label

Black Star Inc.
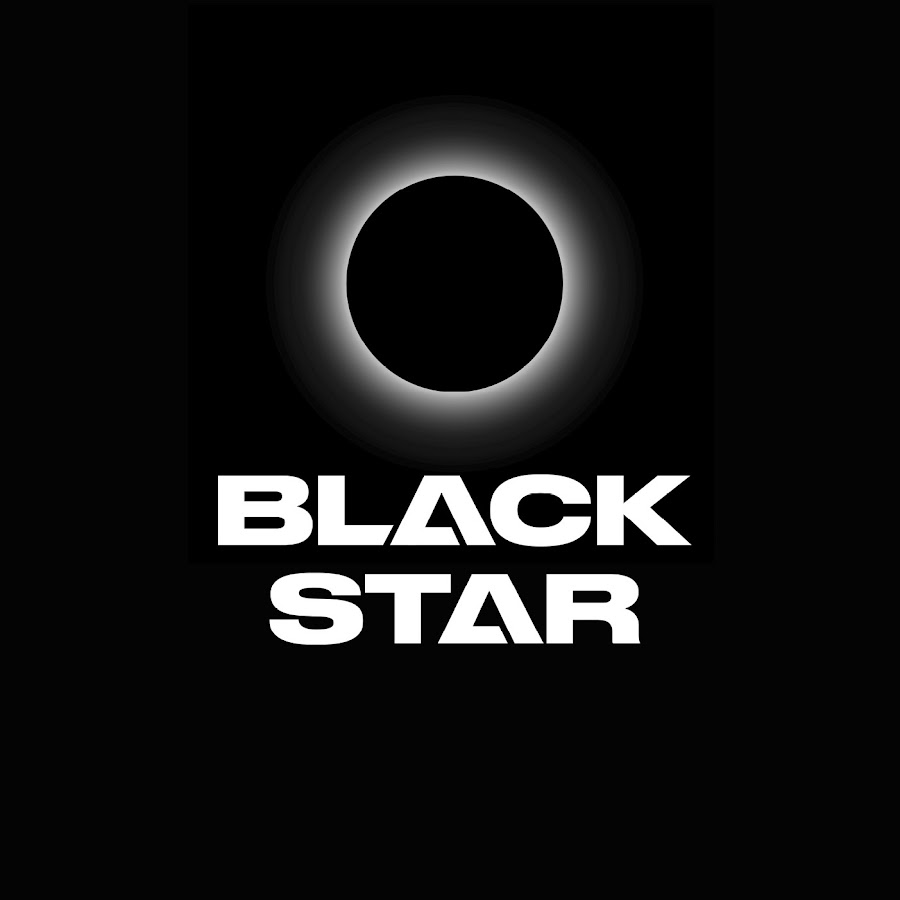
- Founded: 2006; 20 years ago
- Founder: Timati
- Distributor: Believe
- Genre: Pop; Hip hop
- Country of origin: Russia
- Location: Moscow, Russia

Black Star is a Russian record label & production company. The label's artists include Egor Ship, Klava Koka, Nazima, Natan & other singers.

== History ==
In 2007, «Black Star Inc.» with the companies «АРС» & «IlyaKireev Company» organized an R&B/Soul festival under the title «Vерсия 0.1».

In 2009, producer Valeriy Evsikov left the label, having previously collaborated with Timati for more than three years and authored songs like «Потанцуй», "Forever", "Плачут небеса", and "Не сходи с ума".

In Fall 2015, Black Star signed a new artist, rapper Alexander Morozov from Tomsk, better known as Sasha Chest. On 7 October he published a video with Timati called «Лучший друг», for Vladimir Putin's birthday.

On 16 February 2019, the label conducted a second round of casting for the second season of the show «Песни» on the channel ТNТ. As a result of the casting, the label's new artists were Vyacheslav Isakov (Slame), Anna Boronina, Arsen Antonya, Artem Amchislavsky (Amchi) and Anna Saidaleva (Anet Sai) when their contracts ended.

=== Departure of artists (2018–2021) ===
On 27 July 2020, the label removed its founder Timati, also removing the full catalog of his songs. The reason for it is due to a "loss of charm" from the label.

In September 2021, Egor Ship joined the label.

In January 2022, Mot left the label.

== Musical releases ==
Year	Release	Singer	Type
2006	Black Star	Timati	Studio Album
2009	The Boss	Timati	Studio Album
2012	VKLYBE.TV MUSIC COLLECTION — DJ M.E.G.	DJ MEG	Mixtape
2012	"Счастливый..."	Music Hayk	Mixtape
2012	"Холодное сердце"	Geegun	Studio Album
2012	SWAGG	Timati	Studio Album
2013	"Спутник"	L’One	Studio Album
2013	"Чёрточка"	Mot	EP
2013	"13"	Timati	Studio Album
2013	"Музыка. Жизнь."	Geegun	Studio Album
2013	"Всё будет"	Black Star Inc.	Collaboration
2014	"#КАМЕНОЛОМНЯ"	DJ Philchansky & DJ Daveed	Mixtape
2014	Azbuka Morze	Mot	Studio Album
2014	"Одинокая вселенная"	L'One	Studio Album
2014	"Даже не думай"	Group "Панама"	EP
2014	"Аудио Капсула"	Timati	EP
2015	"Holostyak"	Egor Kreed	Studio Album
2015	"Автолюбитель"	L'One	EP
2016	"Наизнанку"	Mot	Studio Album
2016	"C самых низов"	L'One	EP
2016	"Олимп"	Timati	Studio Album
2016	"92 дня"	Mot	Studio Album
2016	"Оттуда, где я"	Скруджи	EP
2016	"#КАМЕНОЛОМНЯ 2"	DJ Philchansky & DJ Daveed	Mixtape
2016	"Гравитация"	L'One	Studio Album
2016	"Светом во тьме"	Kristina Si	Studio Album
2016	"В пути"	MC Doni	EP
2017	"Что они знают?"	Egor Kreed	Studio Album
2017	"Добрая музыка клавиш"	Mot	Studio Album
2017	"Black Star. Лучшее за 10 лет"	Black Star	Collaboration
2017	"1985"	L'One	EP
2018	"Катафалк"	Скруджи	EP
2018	"Мыслепад"	Dana Sokolova	Studio Album
2018	"Какие люди в Голливуде (Или премия "Оскар" с субтитрами)"	Mot	EP
2018	"Танцуй" & "Чувствуй"	Misha Marvin	EPs
2019	"Пангея"	L'One	Studio Album
2019	"Неизданное"	Black Star	Collaboration
2019	"Мой город 2.0"	Pabl.A	EP
2019	"9"	Natan	EP
2019	"Фонари"	Dana Sokolova	EP
2019	"Секреты"	Nazima	EP
2019	"Неприлично о личном"	Klava Koka	Studio Album
2020	"Парабола"	Mot	Studio Album
2021	"Чувствуй. Танцуй"	Misha Marvin	Concert Album
2021	"Ч.2. Любовь"	Anet Sai	EP
2021	"Ч.3. Любовь"	Anet Sai	EP
2021	"Любовь. Слезы. Движ."	Anet Sai	Studio Album
2022	"Отпусти"	Baur Karbon	EP
2023	DIORЫ	Egor Ship	EP
