= Black and White (rap group) =

Soviet rap group

Black and White Чёрное и Белое
- Origin: St. Petersburg, Russia
- Genres: Hip Hop
- Occupations: Rappers, producers, performers
- Years active: 1989-1992
- Past members: Igor Golubev Rodion Chistyakov

Black and White (Russian: Чёрное и Белое, romanized: Chornoe i Byeloe) was a Soviet and Russian rap group from Leningrad, Russia, first formed in February 1989 in the production center of Vladimir Kiselyov. The group included Igor Golubev, Rodion Chistyakov and breakdancers from the group, Stop. Chistyakov was responsible for the music, and Golubev for the lyrics. According to Kiselyov, it is the first rap group in the USSR, also mentioned by the French newspaper La République du Center and the Gosteleradiofond music channel as “the first Soviet rap group” and the online publication Lenta.ru as “one of the first rap groups in the USSR.”

The group began in a rudimentary form in 1988, working with Soviet breakdancers, and mixing both languages (Russian and English), and fashions from America and Russia. The group, consisting of Igor Golubev and Rodion Chistyakov, made its television debut with the song “Dancing” in the “ Wider Circle ” program on May 2, 1989. Following this, more television performances would popularize the group throughout Russia. In July 1989, the duo turned into a group after they took breakdancers from the group “Stop” into their team. Over the three years of its existence, four video clips were shot for the songs “Ohm’s Law” (1989), “Vasya the Hooligan” (1990), “Hello, Garage!” (1991) and "Money" (1991). The group released two albums - “Vasya the Hooligan” (1990) and “Childhood” (1991), as well as the Red Arrow maxi-single “Tschaikowsky’s Revenge” (1990) with a circulation of 400 thousand copies.

Their third album, "Les Russes Attaquent," was released by Vingt Heures Productions in France under the name "Noir & Blanc" (from French - “Black and White”) in 1991, and in Moscow it was published by the Harmony studio under the name “Igor and Rodion” in the form of a magnetic album “Money” in 1992. The group starred in the films “White Nights” (1991) and “Good luck to you, gentlemen!” (1992), and broke up in early 1992 after its dancers moved to the rap group "Bachelor Party."

One of the group members, Rodion Chistyakov, died from complications of pneumonia on November 22, 2017.

== Discography ==
Black and White

- 1990 — Vasya The Hooligan
- 1991 — Childhood

Red Arrow

- 1990 — Tschaikowsky's Revenge (Maxi-single)

Noir & Blanc

- 1991 — Les Russes Attaquent

Igor and Rodyon

- 1992 — Money

Igor and Jambo

- 1997 — Childhood

== See also ==
- Russian hip hop
- Jam Style & Da Boogie Crew
- DA-108
