= Jeeep (rapper) =

Russian rapper (born 1974)

Jeeep Джип
- Born: 7 September 1974 (age 52); Moscow, Russia
- Genres: Hip-hop
- Occupations: Rapper, songwriter
- Years active: 1992–present
- Labels: RAP Recordz, "Intelligent Hooligan Productions"
- Formerly of: "C.T.L. D.L.L." (1992-1994) "Slaves of the Lamp " (1996-2003) DOB Community (1994-2012) "Empire" (2000) "Fury Inc." (2010—2013) TIR (2016—present)
- Website: https://vk.com/club21531371

Maksim Evgenievich Gololobov (born 7 September 1974), better known as Jeeep (Jeep), is a Russian rapper, a former member of the K.T.L. D.L.L., Slaves of the Lamp, D.O.B. Community, "Empire", "Fury Inc.". He is the founder and participant of the T.I.R. project.

In 1992, Jeep joined the K.T.L. D.L.L. group, with which he recorded eight tracks until its breakup. In 1996, together with Grundik, he formed the duet Slaves of the Lamp, who only released one album, It Doesn't Hurt. After Grundik's death, Maksim joined the D.O.B. Community, with which he released three albums. In 2004 Jeep released his solo album Here I Was. In 2010, together with rappers Legalize and Max Lomak (ex-FMWL), he created the Rage Inc. project, which published one album, Barrel of Tar. In 2016, together with bass player Alexey Avdeev, he founded the duo T.I.R. He took part in the creation of documentaries Slave of the Lamp (2016), Yug: The Last Word (2016) and BEEF: Russian Hip-Hop (2019) directed by rapper Roma Zhigan.

In 2004, Jeep was mentioned by Rap.ru as "the most expressive MC in D.O.B. Community" and as the owner of "the most original voice in Russian rap", and members of the group "K.T.L. D.L.L." called "underground legends". In 2007, the Russian edition of Billboard magazine named D.O.B. Community "sign formation", and the group "C.T.L. D.L.L." and "Slaves of the Lamp" referred to the "kings of the underground of Moscow." In the same year, the Rap.ru portal indicated the members of the D.O.B. Community "legendary", and two years later RAPpress magazine referred to the group as "cult". In 2015, The-Flow magazine named D.O.B. Community "the iconic hip-hop association of the 90s", the group "K.T.L. D.L.L." - "pioneers of the Moscow underground", and the group "Slaves of the Lamp" - "new rap poetry."

== Career ==
In 1991, Maxim Gololobov became interested in hip-hop music thanks to his acquaintance with Sergei "Sir-J" Bulavintsev, who at that time had a collection of American rap music that he himself had brought from the USA. Gololobov often spent time at Sir-J's house, listening to and transcribing albums on audio cassettes. In 1992, at the 2/2 club, Gololobov met the future members of the Cash Brothers group (N'Pans, Bual, Jackson), who began to teach him how to breakdance. It was they who nicknamed him "Jeep" because of his red jacket with a patch that says "Jeep" that he wore.

=== K. T. L. D. L. L. ===
On 19 December 1991, Jeep met a dancer from Madagascar named Kristin, who invited him to work as a backup dancer for rapper MC Anthony at the Jump disco at the Druzhba Multipurpose Arena in the Luzhniki Olympic Complex as part of the Igor's Pop Show musical show project. On the same day, the group "Bachelor Party" performed there, which had breakers as backup dancers - Kirill Lisovsky ("Seal") and Dmitry Lanin ("Moose"). After the concert, Jeep met Seal and Los, who at that time had the idea to create a rap project called "K.T.L. D.L.L." (an abbreviation of the full names of Tyulen and Elk: Kirill "Tyulen" Lisovsky and Dima "Moose" Lanin).

Jeep decided to join their group. Inviting him to his home in Orekhovo-Borisovo North, Tyulen showed him his lyrics and music. The cost of recording one track at the studio at that time cost from one hundred to two hundred dollars, so Jeep offered them to record two songs with the money of the father of his new acquaintance, Konstantin Vasilevsky ("Iceberg"), whom he met at the Dukat club. The meeting of the band members with Vasilevsky took place at a concert of the French rapper MC Solaar at the Orion Club on 9 June 1992.

A few days later, the four of them went to the studio and recorded the first song called "You are a corpse." Two months later, the track "Only the Killed Is Out of Danger" (aka "Streets") was recorded. Guitarist Zuy took part in the recording of both tracks. The day after the recording of the track "Streets", the group "K.T.L. D.L.L." performed with her at the first All-Russian rap festival, organized by the producer of Lika MS (Lika Olegovna Pavlova), Sergey Obukhov (Class Studio), in Moscow's Gorky Park in August 1992. Music critic Artemy Troitsky was the chairman of the jury of the festival, and Lolita Milyavskaya and Alexander Tsekalo (Cabaret duet "Academy") were the hosts. Group "K.T.L. D.L.L." took third place, second place went to Bad Balance, and first place went to MD & C Pavlov.

In early 1993, at the SBI Records studio, together with the techno group The Cool Front ("Cold Front"), a remix was made for the song "You are a corpse", and the song "They are not among the world" (aka "They") was also recorded. At the same time, the song "Forbidden Quarter" was recorded with a local rock band with the participation of guitarist Zuya, with which the group performed twice. At that time, the band members began to use marijuana, under the influence of which the last three songs were recorded at the MixArt studio at Alexander Kornyshev in April: "My every new day", "I'm waiting for the night" and "It will be easier for you." The lyrics of the songs "My every new day" and "I'm waiting for the night" were invented by Tyulen at Bogdan Titomir's house after celebrating his birthday.

In May, Dmitry Lanin ("Moose") left to serve in the army for a year. In June, the K.T.L. D.L.L." consisting of two people, Jeep and Iceberg, performed the song "You are a corpse" at the White Nights of St. Petersburg festival in the Oktyabrsky Big Concert Hall, where the Yo! MTV Raps broadcast was made. In the fall, Jeep left to serve in the army. With his departure, the group did not record a single new track, since, in his opinion, he was always the driving force in it. In 1994, the songs "My every new day" and "I'm waiting for the night" were released on the collections "Rap around you" from the Soviet/Russian Soyuz Recording Studio_{[rus]} and "Da Moscow Rap Flava."

On 19 February 2013, the founder of the K.T.L. Di.L.L., Cyril "Seal" Lisovsky, died of bronchial asthma, which he suffered from childhood, at the age 38.

=== Slaves of the Lamp ===
In 1995, after returning from the army, Jeep learned that the C.T.L. D.L.L." no longer exists, and its participants are addicted to drugs. Jeep also became addicted. At the birthday party of Alexei Smirnov (Lee AS), Jeep met Andrey Menshikov (Ligalize), who invited him to his home at VDNKh to create a new project, Slaves of the Lamp. Jeep's partner in the group was Alexey Perminov (Grundik). In 1996, the group became part of the hip-hop association DOB Community. Jeep featured on the DOB Community track "Livin' in Style (Stolen Loop Mix)", where he performed a heavily altered verse from the track "My Every New Day". In 1997, Legalize helped Slaves of the Lamp to record their debut album, It Doesn't Hurt at the studio and release it in April 1998 on Elias Records.

On 12 June 2000, a member of the Slaves of the Lamp group, Alexei "Grundik" Perminov, died at the age of twenty-four from a drug overdose. In 2000, after the death of Grundik, the Empire project was formed, which included the groups Yu.G. and DOB Community. Two songs were recorded, which were produced by Andrey Kit : "Dedication" (in memory of Grundik) (with the participation of Stahey from the group "Shadows") and "Superlyric" (with the participation of Dime from Nonamerz). Both tracks were released on the Best Hip Hop 2 compilation in the summer of 2001. "Dedication" was later released on the reissue of the album This Isn't B. The uncensored version of "Super Lyrics" was released on the compilation "5 Years of RAP Recordz" on 20 June 2002.

From 2001 to 2003, Jeep, together with Mikhail Gumankov, recorded four new tracks and released them on behalf of the Slaves of the Lamp group: "My friend" (2001), "Life is like this ..." (2002), "Personal" (2003 ), "Last Sunday" (2003). According to Jeep, Grundik planned to make a more electronic project in the future, which Jeep brought to life. Later, Jeep released another track, "Dump", recorded during this period. All lyrics in these songs were written by him.

=== D. O. B. Community ===
After Grundik's death, seven members of DOB Community (Sir-J, Jeeep, Mani Mike, DJ Pahan, Simone Yori, Gvozd and Ladjak) recorded the album "100 Overcoming Barriers" (2001). After its release, four remained in the group: Sir-J, Jeeep, Money Mike and DJ Pahan. In this composition, from 2002 to 2004, the second album " Polychrome Product " (2007) was recorded. On 23 November 2004, Jeep's solo album " Here I Was " was released on the label "Intelligent Hooligan Productions", the music for which was created by Sir-J . Sir-J, G-Wylx, Pencil, Yu.G. (Kit, S. O. Mak), DJ Nik1, " Ezekiel 25:17 ", Sander and "43 degrees" (Kot, Kote). On 19 December 2004, Jeep and Ice reunited as "C.T.L. D.L.L." and performed the song "My Every New Day" at the anniversary concert of the Rap Music Festival_{[rus]}. From 2003 to 2004, in the Freestyle hip-hop show on Nashe Radio, several songs were featured. They were, "It just so happened" and "Troeshniki" by D..O.B. Community, "Super Lyrics" of the Empire project and "TV Shit" and the "PKKZHS" from Slaves of the Lamp.

19 February 2009 on the label RAP Recordz released a joint album of Jeep and "Kit" "Our business ", where Keith is presented only as a beatmaker. On 5 May, the same label released a joint album by Sir-J and Jeep under the brand name DOB Community "TreFy-F-FankoFF ". The album was distributed by CD Land Records. This album is a tribute to the funk genre. "Fox [TZ]", "43 Degrees" and Money Mike took part in the recording of the album. On 25 March 2010, Jeep's collaboration album with FMWL, "X" was released on RAP Recordz . The release was accompanied by a video clip for the song "Moscow-Belgrade". The album was produced by Mikhail Gumankov, who previously worked on the production for Slaves of the Lamp in 2002.

=== Rage Inc. ===
In 2010, the Rage Inc. project was created, which included Legalize, Jeep and Max Lomak (ex-FMWL). Jeep and Lomak were the lyricists, while Ligalize was only responsible for the music. The album "Barrel of Tar" was released on CD by the Nikitin Recording Company on 3 November 2012. Video clips for the songs "Tang Tzu," "Rage", "War" and "Three Planes" were released. In 2013, Lomak left the project, and Jip and Ligalize began to record a second album, but by the end of the year, Ligalize took up a solo career without completing the album. Several lyrics recorded for the second album, Jeep used in his new project. Among them is a joint song with Sir-J "It's cold for me", which was released on TIR's debut album, "Please Yes."

=== TIR ===
In 2016, Jeep, together with bass player Alexey Avdeev ("Major"), founded the TIR (True Industrial Romantic) project. In 2019, the group released the album "Please Yes", and in 2020 - the album "Beginning".

== Personal life ==
Since 2003, Maxim Gololobov has been working for the advertising company Publicis Groupe Media Eurasia, where he started his career as a courier. For more than 10 years he has been fond of classical boxing. He is married and the father of one child.

== Discography ==
=== Solo albums ===
- 2004 - I Was Here

=== Collaborative albums ===
- 2009 - Jeeep & Keith - " Our Business "
- 2010 — Jeeep & F.M.W.L — «X»

=== Group albums ===
- 1998 - Slaves of the Lamp - "It Doesn't Hurt" (reissued in 2001, 2003 and 2020)
- 2001 - DOB Community - "100 obstacles overcoming"
- 2007 - DOB Community - " Polychrome Product "
- 2009 - DOB Community - " TreFy-F-FunkoFF "
- 2012 - Rage Inc. - "Barrel of tar"
- 2019 — T.I.R. — «Please Yes»
- 2020 - TIR - "Beginning"

=== Singles ===
- 1992 - K.T.L. D.L.L. - "You're dead"
- 1992 - K.T.L. D.L.L. - "Only the dead are out of danger" (aka "Streets")
- 1993 - K.T.L. D.L.L. - "You're Dead" (Cool Front Electro Remix)
- 1993 - K.T.L. D.L.L. - "They are not among the world" (aka "They")
- 1993 - K.T.L. D.L.L. - Forbidden Quarter
- 1993 - K.T.L. D.L.L. - "My every new day"
- 1993 - K.T.L. D.L.L. - "I'm waiting for the night"
- 1993 - K.T.L. D.L.L. - "It will be easier for you"
- 2000 - K.T.L. D.L.L. (Jeep, Ice, Seal) - "It will be easier for you" (1993) (DOB Community - "Archive 1992-1996")
- 2000 - Lily, Ladjak, Micah, Legalize, Jeep, Ax, Sir-J - "Livin' in Style" (Stolen Loop Mix) (1996) (DOB Community - "Archive 1992-1996")
- 2001 - Slaves of the Lamp - "My friend" (Slaves of the Lamp - "This is not b.")
- 2002 - Dime, MF, Jeep, D-Bosch - "Nepop" ("Best Hip-Hop #3")
- 2002 - Sander (Mercury) & Jeep (Lamp Slaves, DOB Community) - "No Sects!" ("Rap of two capitals 2")
- 2002 - Slaves of the Lamp - "Life is so ..." ("Rapland 4")
- 2003 - Slaves of the Lamp - "Personal" ("Hip-Hop Quarter (January–February-March)")
- 2003 - Slaves of the Lamp - "Last Sunday" ("Hip-Hop Quarter (July–August-September)")
- 2004 - Jeep - "One-Two (New Year's Greetings)" ("YOlka 2005")
- 2005 - Jeep - "Arms, legs ..." (featuring Fox (TZ)) ("Hip-hop quarter (January–February-March)")
- 2005 - Jeep - "Zamorochki" (feat. Fantomas 2000, Sir-J, Kot) ("Rap.Ru # 3. Collection of the best Russian rap")
- 2005 - DOB Community - "The Same (Kuzmitch Remix)" ("Rap-Style Vol.2")
- 2005 - Jeeep - "Funk Off (New Year's Greetings)" ("YOlka 2006")
- 2005 - Jeeep - "Everything always comes true" ("YOlka 2006")
- 2007 - Jeep - "Instruction" (Huck and friends - "Earth")
- 2009 - Sir-J & Jeeep - "Me and my microphone" (Sir-J prezents "Look from the basement part 1: Hip-hop recruits")
- 2016 - Master Sheff, White Hot Ice, Rustaveli, Sir-J, Jeeep - "In unreal" (Miko - "In unreal")
- 2021 - Jeeep, Ice, Master Spensor - "DOBakery" (Skit) 1996 (DOB Community - "Archive Part II")
- 2021 - Slaves of the Lamp (Grundig, Jeeep) - "Outro" (DOB Community - "Archive Part II")

=== Guest participations ===
- 1998 - DOB - "Slave of the Lamp" (feat. Slaves of the Lamp) (DOB - "Rushun Roolett")
- 1998 — DOB — "Men Is Houze (C Interlude)" (feat. Men) (DOB — "Rushun Roolett")
- 1998 - Carcasses of the Light - "Hints" (feat. Slaves of the Lamp) (Carcasses of the Light - "Do not lean" 2004)
- 1999 - Big Black Boots - "Best MCs" (feat. Legalize & Jeep) ("Ours: New and Unreleased")
- 2000 - Smoke Screen - "Make a Wish" (feat. Jeep, Copper) (Smoke Screen - "Without contraception ...")
- 2000 - Yu.G. - "Ode to the outgoing year" (feat. Slaves of the Lamp and Sir-J) (Yu.G. - "Cheap and cheerful")
- 2001 - Les Misérables - "Worse than living" (feat. Jeep) (Les Misérables - "Archive (Music of the Streets part 4)")
- 2003 - Third Way - "Wounds" (feat. Jeep, Beast (Les Miserables)) (Third Way - "A Piece of Life (Equal to Five Years)")
- 2003 - The Third Way - "Freestyle (Mezhdutema)" (feat. Jeep) (Third Way - "A Piece of Life (Equal to Five Years)")
- 2003 - Huck - "Pro MS" (feat. Jeep) (Huck - "First there was the sun")
- 2003 - Da Manifest - "Our Ways" (feat. Jeep (Slaves of the Lamp)) (Da Manifest - "Manifestation")
- 2004 - Mercury - "Thermometer" (feat. Jeep) (Mercury - "0.5")
- 2004 - Project Blockade - "Vivat, underground" (feat. Sir-J & Jeeep) ("Rapland Music 2004 Part 2 Tracks 20-39")
- 2004 - DOB - "The Word of the Jeep" (feat. Jeep) (DOB - "Kings of the Underground")
- 2005 - Sir-J - "Minimalism" (feat. Jeep 4x4) (Sir-J - "Down the ordinate")
- 2008 - Carcasses Light Band - "SDA" (feat. Jeep 4x4) (Carcasses Light Band - "Hi-Tech: High Technologies")
- 2008 - Noggano - "Voice of the Underground" (feat. Jeeep)
- 2008 - Ezekiel 25:17 - "Island" (feat. Jeep) (Ezekiel 25:17 / Dj Navvy - Alloys)
- 2009 - A. Nuzhdin, Master Sheff, Mr. Simon, Al Solo, Ladjak, Sir-J, G-Wilkes, Crack (Golden Mic), Money Mike, Buck, Jeeep, Regik, Iceman - "Rap Music 2008" ("Rap Music Live 2008")
- 2009 - Master SHEFF - "Rap Music" (feat. Mr. Simon, Al Solo, A. Nuzhdin, LadJak, Sir-J, G-Wilkes, Crack (Golden Mic), Money Mike, Buck, Jeeep, Regik, Ice, Banana) ("Hip-Hop Info #9")
- 2010 - tonn_pavloff - "This is DOB Community" (feat. Sir-J, Jeeep) (tonn_pavloff - "Real hip-hop")
- 2010 - tonn_pavloff - "Real hip-hop" (feat. Vint, Mad Max, MC Mix, Shotgun, Dime, Huck, Money Mike, Jeeep, MD&C Pavlov, Maestro A-Sid, Serge STDK UzCoast, Papa Goose, Pro100% Frol, Scala, Chrome, Al Solo, Varchun, Evil, Sir-J, Muk, Business, Lenin, Pencil, Master Sheff, DJ LA) (tonn_pavloff - "Real hip-hop")
- 2011 - Jimmy Jay - "I'm Tired" (feat. Stepman, Mal Da Udal, Jeeep (DOB Community)) (Jimmy Jay - "Very Personal")
- 2013 - Raptila Camaradaz - "Mythbusters" (feat. Jeeep) (Raptila Camaradaz - "Mythbusters")=

== Filmography ==
=== Documentaries ===
- 2016 - Slave of the Lamp
- 2016 - "YUG: The Last Word"
- 2019 - " BEEF: Russian hip-hop "

=== Music video ===
- 2001 - "We" (as part of DOB Community )
- 2010 - Moscow-Belgrade (together with FMWL)
- 2012 - "Tang Tzu" (as part of "Rage Inc.")
- 2012 - "Rage" (as part of "Rage Inc.")
- 2013 - "War" (as part of "Rage Inc.")
- 2013 - "Three planes" (as part of "Rage Inc.")

== See also ==
- Russian hip hop
- Breakdancing
