= Pale (musician) =

Russian rapper (born 1976)

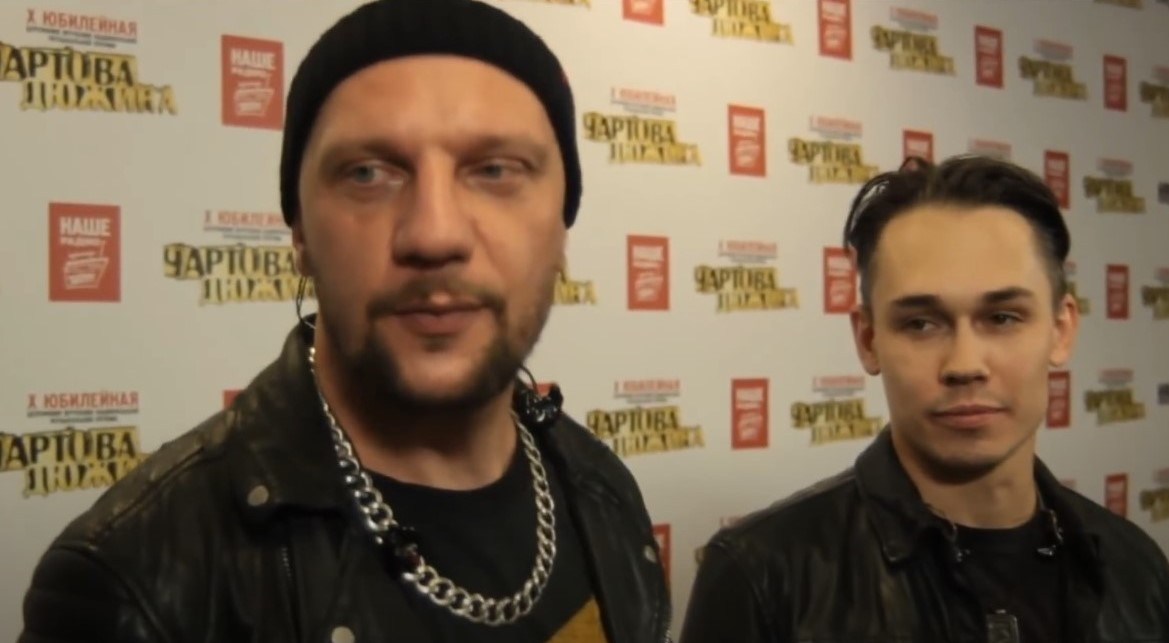

Background information
- Born: Andrei Alexandrovich Pozdnukhov; 7 November 1976 (age 49); Tara, Omsk Oblast, Russian SFSR, USSR
- Origin: Russian
- Genres: Hip hop
- Member of: 25/17
- Formerly of: Mercury
- Spouse: One
- Website: 2517.ru/

Andrey Alexandrovich Pozdnukhov (Russian: Андре́й Алекса́ндрович Позднухо́в), better known by his stage name Bledny (born 7 November 1976, Tara, Omsk, RSFSR, USSR) is a Russian rap artist, founder and member of the 25/17 group, and a former member of the Mercury group.

== Biography ==
In 1998, Pozdnukhov became a member of the Mercury group, which performed gangsta rap. They released several albums and gained some fame in Omsk. It was around this time that he would also begin his own label, Ambush Production, although it would only last until 2010.

At the end of 2012, Pozdunknov starred in a video aimed at drawing attention to discrimination against people with an HIV infection. In 2019, he noted that the operations of the "25/17" group would temporarily suspend, although in 2020 the group reemerged and would continue to release music until the present day. In 2022, they released the album, "Overcome" (Odolyen), featuring a cover of Soviet rock musician Viktor Tsoi's song "April"[rus]

=== Personal life ===
Pozdnukhov has been married twice. He met his second wife when he was doing state practice in fine arts at the gymnasium, where she studied in the eleventh grade. In 2003 they celebrated their wedding. On 15 March 2011 a son, Yaroslav, was born. On 6 November 2014 Stanislav's daughter was born. Pozdnukhov professes the faith of Protestant Christianity.

== Discography ==
=== In Mercury ===
- 1999 — First Mercury
- 2000 — Blue

=== In "25/17" (formerly "Ezekiel 25:17") ===
==== Studio albums ====
- 2004 - The word of honor of the third dungeon
- 2008 - Ambush. Stronger than steel
- 2009 - Only for their own
- 2010 - Zebra
- 2012 - Songs of Love and Death
- 2014 - Russian plantain
- 2017 - Eve goes to Babylon
- 2022 - Inevitability
- 2022 - Room. housewarming
- 2022 - Overcome

==== Mini-Albums ====
- 2010 - The power of resistance (together with " GROT ")
- 2010 - Black stripe
- 2011 - Off season
- 2013 - Evil Days
- 2015 - Steam
- 2016 - Just
- 2017 - Die of happiness (together with Andrey Kit )
- 2020 - Tales from the Crypt
- 2020 - Tales from the Crypt 2
- 2020 - Tales from the Crypt 3

==== Mixtapes ====
- 2007 - Life U (together with DJ Navvy)
- 2008 - Alloys (together with DJ Navvy)

==== Compilations ====
- 2012 - On the wave
- 2013 - Logbook (10 years on the wave. Live)

==== Maxi singles and promo releases ====
- 2005 - So it was nada
- 2008 - Hold on tight (with DJ Navvy)
- 2010 - Spring for everyone!

==== Singles ====
- 2009 - On the city map
- 2009 - My weapon (p.o. FAQ)
- 2009 - T.D.S.
- 2010 - Dog
- 2010 - No one can stop me
- 2011 - Fire
- 2012 - Russian
- 2013 - Inside a broken head
- 2014 - Until the lights are turned off
- 2014 - Rahunok
- 2014 - Name of names
- 2015 - Under the Gypsy Sun (Acoustic version)
- 2015 - The whole world goes to war with me
- 2015 - Networks (p.u. Branimir)
- 2015 - Goldfinches
- 2015 - Alive
- 2016 - "Hot Weekdays" (In memory of Anatoly Krupnov)
- 2016 - Siberian march (Kalinov bridge cover)
- 2017 - She is not like everyone else
- 2017 - Room
- 2022 - Rossimon
- 2022 - Culture

=== In Ice 9 project ===
==== Studio albums ====
- 2011 - Cold War
- 2013 - Temptation of a holy commoner (album) | Temptation of a holy commoner
- 2019 - Deafening silence

==== Singles ====
- 2011 - Even worse
- 2013 - Fire
- 2013 - 999
- 2013 - Furnace

== See also ==
- Russian hip hop
- Husky (rapper)
- Jeeep (rapper)
