= Rap Music Festival =

- Frequency: Annually
- Location: Moscow
- Country: Russia
- Inaugurated: November 17–19, 1994
- Organiser: Vlad Valov (of Bad Balance)

Rap Music is an annual international rap music festival and competition held in Moscow, Russia. It was established in 1994 with the goal of discovering new names in the genre of rap music. It was first initiated by the Hip-Hop Culture Center, whose general producer was Vlad Valov, the leader of the Russian rap group Bad Balance. The event is held in high regard within Russian Hip Hop culture and considered to be a launching point for groups who win.

Conventionally, only ten entries are selected to participate in the final concert competition. The winner receives the grand prize and the opportunity to record an album with the domestic label, 100PRO (rus), although earlier winners received different types of recording opportunities. In addition, three groups are awarded as first, second, and third, respectively.

In 2014, the annual festival also marked its 20th anniversary, with the event featuring performances from cultural historic rappers like ST (Alexander Stepanov), and featured a full jury of representatives from Russian rap culture's 1990s and 2000s centuries like Sir J (DOB Community) and Lojaz (Killed by Rap).

== Beginnings ==
In 1993, Bad Balance undertook a tour covering countries within central Europe and the eastern coast of South America. This tour proved seminal for their tuition on Hip Hop culture, exposed them to many different communities, and helped foster their sense of cultural stewardship. As Valov noted, "By the end of [1993], we realized we weren't just the bearers of this culture, but also domestic artists who should attract Russian-speaking crews to the movement."

Upon their return home, the Hip-Hop Culture Center was quickly developed in Moscow, with Valov at its head, and throughout the year various events were held for the individual elements of Hip Hop culture. However, Rap Music festival's start began in the fall of 1994, with the venue of choice being the Moscow Palace of Youth, the principle venue of the festival to this day, although other spaces are utilized. This first and second festivals secure the festival's selection, voting, and award procedures, and in 2000 a new prize was added, the Best MC of the Year. As Valov noted, venue was a deeply important part of the festival, "We decided against holding Rap Music in huge halls and avoided the extensive advertising that attracts unprepared people to the event."

== Festival details ==
| Year | Dates | Venue | Grand Prix | Winners | Best MC | Best Female MC |
|---|---|---|---|---|---|---|
| 1994 | Nov. 17–19 | Moscow Palace of Youth | IFK | DA-108 (2nd), White Hot Ice (3rd) | | |
| 1995 | | | | | | |
| 1996 | Dec. 18–19 | Moscow Palace of Youth | | Da-108 (1st), Made in Russia (2nd), Counter Attack (3rd) | | |
| 1997 | Dec. 28 | Soviet Wings Sport Palace | Necessary Things | Tree of Life (1st), Tank on the Maidan Kongo (2nd), Killed by Rap (3rd) | | |
| 1998 | Dec. 13 | Moscow Palace of Youth | | Typical Rhythms (1st), White Brothers (2nd), Tank on the Maidan Kongo (3rd) | | |
| 1999 | Nov. 27 | Moscow Palace of Youth | Kasta | Blanzh (1st), Third Eye (2nd), Nevsky Beat (3rd) | | |
| 2000 | Dec. 20 | Olympic Stadium (Moscow) | Ikambi Gwa Gwa | South Central 54 (1st), Counter Thrust (2nd), District of my Dreams (3rd) | | |
| 2001 | Dec. 27 | Moscow Palace of Youth | Dynasty Di | Shadows (1st), Party (2nd), Voice of Donbass (3rd) | | |
| 2002 | Dec. 29 | Yubileyny Sports Palace | X-Team | DSMS (1st), Green Syndrome (2nd), Maryjane (3rd) | Alexander Malets (Kapa) | |
| 2003 | Dec. 12 | Krasnodar Stadium | Triada | | | |
| 2004 | Dec. 19 | Tochka Club (Moscow) | ReЦiDiV | AK Syndrome (1st), K&M (2nd), D-Slam (3rd) | Stanislav Kravchuk (Q-Fast) | |
| 2005 | Dec. 12 | Tochka Club (Moscow) | Handicap | Trajectory of Life (1st), Lovchie (2nd), Saga (3rd) | Vitaly Kozyr (Коzyr) | |
| 2006 | Dec. 12 | | Digital | М.Са7 (1st), Nebrosko (2nd), State of Mind (3rd) | Artyom Kabanov (Техх) | |
| 2007 | Dec. 12 | Tochka Club (Moscow) | Digital Squad | Black Belt (1st), Fakir and Cox (2nd), Testaments 67 (3rd) | Yashar Gasanov (Yashar) | |
| 2008 | Dec. 10 | Tochka Club (Moscow) | NKS | Baza 8.5 (1st), Sadyle (2nd), Etika Mono (3rd) | Alexander Kotyenov (Laut) | |
| 2009 | Dec. 20 | B2 Music Club (Moscow) | Crime Crew | U-fo (1st), GMA (2nd), Slozhnye (3rd) | | |
| 2010 | | B2 Music Club (Moscow) | | | | |
| 2011 | Dec. 17 | Lookin Rooms Club (Moscow) | | | | Sexy Liya, Tommy, SHMEL, Big Ma, Kima, Yu-LA |
| 2012 | | Lookin Rooms Club (Moscow) | MariAlikhari | Backflip (1st), MF&Varzan (2nd), LM (3rd) | Sasha Nazarov (Varzan) | |
| 2013 | Dec. 22 | Lookin Rooms Club (Moscow) | | | | |
| 2014 | Dec. 21 | Lookin Rooms Club (Moscow) | | | | |
| 2015 | Dec. 19 | Lookin Rooms Club (Moscow) | | | | |
| 2016 | Dec. 18 | Lookin Rooms Club (Moscow) | | | | |
| 2017 | Dec. 2 | | Chromosomes | Upperground (1st), Truektoria (2nd), PakiPache (3rd) | | |
| 2018 | | | Power of Words | Crimean Massif (1st), GTO (2nd), Region 73 (3rd) | | |
| 2019 | Dec. 14 | Glastonerry Club (Moscow) | | | | |
| 2020 | Dec. 12 | Pravda Club (Moscow) | | | | |
| 2021 | Dec. 26 | Pravda Club (Moscow) | YuzhAk | Mutant Squad (1st), Chinatown (2nd), Monosoul (3rd) | Pavel Broderick | |
| 2022 | Dec. 13 | Pravda Club (Moscow) | NON-philosophy | DIZZ & KURASSAN (1st), Flow Mo (2nd), Squad 77 (3rd) | | |
| 2023 | Dec. 17 | Lookin Rooms Club (Moscow) | | | | |
| 2024 | Dec. 7 | Pravda Club (Moscow) | | | | |
| 2025 | Dec. 14 | Glastonerry Club (Moscow) | | | | |

== See also ==
- Russian hip-hop
- List of hip-hop festivals
