= Russian hip-hop =

Hip-hop in Russian or by Russian artists

Russian hip hop refers to hip hop music recorded in Russia or in the Russian language in former Soviet states such as Ukraine, Belarus, Tatarstan and Kazakhstan. Hits by Russian rappers are included in the soundtracks of some PC-games and have formed part of several popular internet memes.

Many Russian rap artists have achieved commercial success, including Detsl, Bad Balance, Face, Skryptonite, Husky, Basta, Feduk, GeeGun, Centr, Morgenshtern, Timati, Ligalize, Markul, Slava Marlov, Kizaru, Instasamka, Slava KPSS, Pale, Irina Smelaya, Loc-Dog, Big Baby Tape, L'One, Mayot, Pharaoh, Jah Khalib, Soda Luv, Macan, Smoky Mo, Eldzhey, Bogdan Titomir, Egor Kreed, T-Killah, Kasta, Oxxxymiron, Boulevard Depo and Belarusian artist Seryoga.

Especially at the end of the 2010s and the beginning of the 2020s, rap has become a very political form of music in Russia. In this respect, rap could be compared to rock in the 1980s, which gave voice to young people critical of the Soviet system, expressed, for example, by Viktor Tsoi's song "Khochu peremen" ("I want changes").

The increased politicization was most impressively demonstrated at the end of 2018, when a string of concerts were canceled. Among them was a performance by rapper Khaski (real name Dmitry Kuznetsov) in Krasnodar at the end of November. After the local prosecutor's office banned him from performing at Club Bounce on the grounds that the music contained extremist ideas, drug glorification and a call to suicide, the rapper stood on the roof of a car and began singing to his fans in the street until the police took him away for "hooliganism" (chuliganstvo) leading to him initially being sentenced to several days in prison. As a result, many famous rappers gave a solidarity concert for him in Moscow.

== History ==
=== 1980s ===
Hip hop culture in Russia began during the mid-late 1970s from the growing influence of the Eurodisco movement in Soviet Russia. However, breaking was one of the first elements of American hip hop culture to become popularized in the country, along with skateboarding, DJing, and MCing shortly after. The beginnings of Russian hip hop's musical form, rap, can be traced back the 1980s. Regarded as the first 'rap group in Russia, the group "Rush Hour" (Chas Pik) created one of the first attempts at rap in their 1984 album, "Rap." The album contained a track called "Rap" which featured lyrics based on multiplication tables and letters and took its inspiration from the funk-based style of the popular track, Rapper's Delight by Sugarhill Gang, released five years earlier. The 1980 Summer Olympics, held in Moscow, was one of the main catalysts for bringing hip hop culture to Soviet Russia, and by 1985 events like the 12th World Festival of Youth and Students and Mikhail Gorbachev's policy of Perestroika further brought Western culture into the country.

=== 1990s ===
Until the beginning of the 1990s, there were not many rap artists in Russia and the Soviet Union.

The pioneers of Russian rap were Mister Maloy, Bad Balance, Malchishnik, Bogdan Titomir. Russian hip hop, just like Canadian hip hop, is inspired by Jamaican music, which hit an upswing during the fall of the Soviet Union. Some of the first groups to emerge from the breakdancing scene was Jam Style & Da Boogie Crew, a group composed of two 'breaking' groups which ultimately coalesced and became popular as collaborators with rap groups and artists alike. Other early attempts at rap were in the group Black and White, a group originating from Djing, forming in 1989, although breaking apart by the early-1990s.

At the early and middle of '90s appears hip-hop scenes in Moscow (D.O.B Community, White Hot Ice) and Saint Petersburg (DA-108, Baltic Clan).

In late 90s, many new performers, such as Mikhey and Jumangee, STDK, and Detsl, had become popular. Many of them were former members of pre-existing bands. At the end of the '90s and beginning of the 2000s, Rostov-on-Don was considered the center of Russian hip hop subculture, and the most notable representative was Kasta.

=== 2000s ===
In the early-2000s, the most popular performers were Kasta, Mnogotochie, Detsl, and Bad Balance.

In the mid-2000s, underground bands began to appear and became popular in Moscow (like Smoky Mo, Dymovaya Zavesa, 25/17, Krovostok, Money Makaz, Supreme Playaz, Underwhat, Ddrop, Kazhe Oboima). At the same time in Russia and Belarus, new R&B performers appeared (Maks Lorens, Bianca, Satsura, Band'Eros). Also this period was marked by the appearance of interesting musical projects such as jazz-rap band KREC, ragga-rap band DA BUDZ, glitch-hop project 2HCompany, comedy gangsta rap Krovostok.

In the late 2000s, the Russian rapper ST1M received scandalous popularity after production of his single "Я Рэп" (I'm Rap), featuring Seryoga, in which he was dissing nearly all of the most notable Russian rappers, similar to "How to Rob" by 50 Cent.

In 2007 the group Centr became increasingly popular, partially due to aggressive promotion on the internet, and in 2008 they won an award at the MTV Russia Music Awards. The members of the group were Aleksey Dolmatov, aka Guf, David Nuriev, aka Ptaha ("ptaha" means "a little bird" in Russian) and Vadim Motylyov, aka Slim. Their two albums, «Качели» (Kacheli/Swing) and «Эфир в норме» (Efir v norme /Ether's Fine) became one of the most popular Russian hip hop albums). In 2008 it won MTV Russia Music Award for Best Hip Hop Project. In 2010 the group disintegrated because of the controversies among its participants and each of them continued a solo career or joined other groups. In the 2016 the group reunited and recorded the new album, «Система» (Sistema / The System).

In 2008 Russian musical channel Muz-TV started a hip-hop show Battle for Respect, which led the winner Ant (Zasada Production) to become highly popular. In 2009, Putin spoke at the Battle for Respect competition and on the one hand praised hip-hop culture for the cultural exchange that it reflects. On the other hand, he spoke about drug abuse, which he claimed was linked partly to the scene. Putin warned against the abuse of addictive substances. However, he said that breakdancing was proof that hip-hop could promote a healthy lifestyle, because in his view such impressive and strenuous dances were simply impossible under the influence of drugs.

In the late 2000s - early 2010s the new notable performers appeared on the Gazgolder Records label, owned by Basta (such as AK47,(gamora) Triagrutrica, Tati, Charusha, Slovetsky and Skriptonit, the DJ from Kazakhstan).

=== 2010s ===
In a 2018 speech, Russian President Vladimir Putin denounced rap music, saying that it would lead to the degradation of Russia and that it rested on the pillars of "sex, drugs and protest." He asked the Council for Culture and Art in St Petersburg to bring rap culture to heel, saying "if it is impossible to stop it, it should be taken over and navigated in a particular way."

=== 2020s ===
Several Russian hip-hop artists gained notable popularity between 2020 and 2025, including Morgenshtern, Husky and Slava Marlow. Other prominent names include Skryptonite, Feduk, and Timati. Some artists, like Face, gained further recognition through collaborations and public statements related to current political events between Russia and Ukraine.

== See also ==
- Hookah rap
- Jam Style & Da Boogie Crew
