= MTV Russia Music Awards =

- Matryoshka – the prize of RMA Awards
- Awarded for: Best in music
- Country: Russia
- Presented by: MTV
- First award: 2004
- Website: http://rma.mtv.ru/

The MTV Russia Music Awards made its debut in 2004 and have celebrated local Russian talent as well as International. The MTV Russia Music Awards (RMA) features local and international acts and music celebrities being honoured by Russian viewers.

== Host cities ==
Year	Venue	Host city	Presenter	Special guests
2004	State Kremlin Palace	Moscow	Konstantin Khabensky	Queen, The Rasmus, Darren Hayes
2005	Red Square	Moscow	Shnur and Anna Azarova	Korn, The 69 Eyes, Kelly Osbourne
2006	Ice Palace	Saint Petersburg	Seryoga	Missy Elliott
2007	Ice Palace Khodynka	Moscow	Pavel Volya and Anna Semenovich	Avril Lavigne
2008	Luzhniki Palace of Sports	Moscow	Dima Bilan and Sergey Lazarev	Jay Sean

== 2004 ==
=== Award winners ===
- Video of the Year: Zveri - "Vsye, chto kasaetsya"
- Best Female Act: Valeriya - "Chasiki"
- Best Male Act: Dolphin - "Vesna"
- Best Group: Zveri - "Vsye, chto kasaetsya"
- Breakthrough of the Year: Uma2rman - "Praskovya"
- Best Song: VIA GRA feat. V.Meladze - "Prityazhenya bolshe net"
- Best International Act: The Rasmus - "In the Shadows"
- Best Pop Act: Smash!! - "Freeway"
- Best Rock Act: Kipelov - "Ya svoboden"
- Best Hip Hop/Rap Act: Kasta - "Revnost"
- Best Dance Act: Nike Borzov feat. Gosti iz budushchego - "Malenkaya loshadka"
- Artist of the Year: Zveri - "Vsye, chto kasaetsya"
- Free Your Mind: Vladimir Posner
- Stay Alive: 1st detachment of the Republican clinical hospital

=== Performances ===
- Queen & Zemfira
- The Rasmus
- Darren Hayes
- Zveri
- Leningrad
- VIA GRA feat. V.Meladze
- Valeriya

== 2005 ==
=== Award winners ===
- Video of the Year: Zemfira - "Blues"
- Best Female Act: Zhasmin - "Oh, How I Need You"
- Best Male Act: Dima Bilan - "On The Heaven’s Shore"
- Best Group: Diskoteka Avariya - "If You Want To Stay"
- Breakthrough of the Year: Masskva - "SMS Love"
- Best Song: Valeriya / Stas Piekha - "So Sad You Are"
- Best International Act: The Black Eyed Peas - "Don't Phunk with My Heart"
- Best Pop Act: Korni - "Happy New Year, Folks"
- Best Rock Act: Zveri - "Strong Booze"
- Best Rap Act: Seryoga - "King Ring"
- Best Dance Act: Vengerov & Fedoroff - "Gentlemen of Luck"
- Best Ringtone: Seryoga - "King Ring"
- Artist of the Year: Dima Bilan
- Free Your Mind: Valery Gazzaev
- Stay Alive: Alexandera Volgina
- MTV Opening FPS

=== Performances ===
- Korn
- The 69 Eyes
- Kelly Osbourne
- Dima Bilan
- Seryoga
- Zemlyane & Zveri
- Korni
- Vlad Topalov

== 2006 ==
=== Award winners ===
- Video of the Year: t.A.T.u. – All About Us
- Best Female Act: Yulia Savicheva
- Best Male Act: Sergey Lazarev
- Best Group: Zveri
- Breakthrough of the Year: Gorod 312
- Best Song: Dima Bilan – "Never Let You Go"
- Best International Act: The Black Eyed Peas
- Best Pop Act: VIA Gra
- Best Rock Act: Tokio
- Best Rap Act: Ligalize - "Budushie mamy"
- Best Ringtone: A'Studio – "Uletayu"
- Artist of the Year: Dima Bilan
- Free Your Mind: Crew of the sailfish Kruzenshtern
- Stay Alive: Vlad Topalov

=== Performances ===
- Missy Elliott
- Dolphin
- Yulia Savicheva
- Ligalize
- Dima Bilan
- VIA GRA
- BAND`EROS
- Tokio
- Gorod 312

== 2007 ==
=== Award winners ===
- Video of the Year: Splean - "Skazhi, chto ya eyo lyublyu"
- Best Female Act: MakSim
- Best Male Act: Dima Bilan
- Best Group: A'Studio
- Breakthrough of the Year: Serebro
- Best Song: Dima Bilan – Nevozmozhnoye vozmozhno/Lady Flame
- Best International Act: Avril Lavigne
- Best Pop Act: MakSim
- Best Rock Act: Bi-2
- Best Rap Act: Byanka
- Artist of the Year: Dima Bilan
- Stay Alive: Chulpan Khamatova's fund "Present Life"
- MTV Opening Alexey Vorobyov

=== Performances ===
- Avril Lavigne
- Dima Bilan & Sebastian
- Boykot & Turbo B
- Julia Kova & Stacks
- Serebro
- Mumiy Troll
- Yulia Savicheva
- Ligalize
- VIA GRA
- A'Studio
- MakSim
- Blestyashchie
- BAND`EROS
- Chelsea
- Tokio

== 2008 ==
=== Award winners ===
- Artist of the Year: Sergey Lazarev
- Video of the Year: Dima Bilan - Number one fan directed by Trudy Bellinger
- Best Male Act: Dima Bilan
- Best Female Act: MakSim
- Best Group: Serebro
- Best New Act: DJ Smash/Fast Food
- Best Dance Project: Diskoteka Avariya feat. Dj Smash
- Best Hip-Hop Project: CENTR feat. Basta
- Best International Act: Jay Sean
- Best Pop Act: Dima Bilan
- Plagiarism of the Year: Zhanna Friske "Zhanna friske" / Paris Hilton "Stars Are Blind"
- Sex: Vintazh/Elena Korikova
- Network: Noganno

Since 2008, Best Rock Act prize is not awarded, because of too few rock bands in MTV Russia format.

=== Performances ===
- Serebro
- Dima Bilan
- Jay Sean
- Sergey Lazarev
- Zveri
- Timati/DJ Smash
- Nastya Zadarozhnaya
- Band'eros
- Zhanna Friske
- Noize MC
- A'Studio
- Mumiy Troll
- VIA Gra

== 2009 (cancelled) ==
2009 RMA was cancelled due to world economic crisis that caused financial problems to organizers. So that was the last event

== Special awards ==
=== Free Your Mind ===
- 2004 — Vladimir Posner
- 2005 — Valery Gazzaev
- 2006 — crew of the sailfish "Kruzenshtern"

=== Legend MTV ===
- 2004 — Viktor Tsoi
- 2005 — Boris Grebenshchikov
- 2006 — Andrey Makarevich
- 2007 — Mumiy Troll
- 2008 — t.A.T.u.

=== VH1 Award ===
- 2006 — Alena Sviridova
- 2007 — Moralny codex

== See also ==
- MTV
- MTV Russia
- MTV Russia Movie Awards
- MTV Networks Europe
