= Centr =

Russian hip hop group

Центр
- Origin: Moscow, Russia
- Genres: Hip hop
- Years active: 2004–present
- Label: ЦАО Records (TSAO Records)
- Members: Ptaha a.k.a. Zanuda (David Nuriev); Slim (Vadim Motylyov); Guf a.k.a. Rolexx (Aleksei Dolmatov) (2004–2009, 2014-present); Princip a.k.a. Prince (2004–2005); DJ Shved (2007–2009)
- Website: www.centrgroup.ru

Centr (Russian: Центр) is a Russian hip hop group formed in Moscow, Russia. Originally composed of Guf, Princip a.k.a. Prince, Slim a.k.a. Slimus, Ptaha a.k.a. Zanuda. In 2008 the group was the winner of the MTV Russia Music Award for Best Hip Hop Project. The group Centr is the founder of the «ЦАО Records» label.

After Guf left Centr in 2009, rumours about the group's breakup began to appear. In 2010 at the “Russian Street Awards” the category for the "Biggest Hip-Hop Event of the Year" in Russia, "the Collapse of the group Centr" was chosen. From 2009 - 2012, the group included just Slim and Ptaha. In 2014, after a 5-year hiatus, it was announced that the group would be re-established. On May 14, 2016, the group played their last show in Frankfurt am Main, Germany and officially announced their disbandment. All of the members of the group continue to release solo projects.

== History ==
The group was formed in 2004 in Moscow, Russia by rappers Guf a.k.a. Rolexx and Princip a.k.a. Prince. Originally they wrote an unofficial album, "Подарок" (Podarok / Gift), but only 13 copies of it were made and the rappers gifted it to their friends for the New Year.

In 2002, Alex Dolmatov also professionally known as Guf, started working on his first album, "Подарок" (Podarok / Gift). It was released in 2005.

In 2006 Guf, Slim & Ptaha wrote down the songs, "Мутные Замуты" (Mutnye Zamuty / Cloudy Trafficking), and "Жара 77" ("Heat 77") specially for the movie "Heat".

At the end of 2006, members of Centr created a label "ЦАО records"; where the group called ‘Dymovaya Zavesa’ including rapper Smoky Mo released the album - "Этажи" (Etazhi / Floors).

In 2007 Guf released his debut album "Город Дорог" ("Gorod Dorog" / "City Of Roads"). In Russia it was recognized as one of the best albums of the year.

On October 25, 2007 the group Centr released its debut album "Kacheli" (Качели / Swings). Princip, the co-founder of the group came out of prison and after his release wrote down the songs, "Железное небо" (Zheleznoe Nebo / Iron Sky), and "Исповедь" (Ispoved' / Confession) ft. Centr. All the songs were included in their debut album "Качели" (Kacheli / Swings).

In 2007 Guf and rapper Basta were the ones to write a second soundtrack, for the movie "Бой с тенью 2: Реванш" (Bou’ S ten'yu 2: Revansh /Shadowboxing 2: Revenge") the track was titled, "Моя игра" (My Game / Moya Igra).

On September 9, 2008 the group performed on the Day of the Actor Broadcast on A-One (TV channel).

The group Centr, together with rapper Basta won the award "MTV RMA" for the song, "City Of Roads" from their debut album "Kacheli" (Качели / Swings)

In 2008 Centr released their second album, "Эфир в норме" (Broadcast's Normal / Efir V Norme). The main themes of the project were Moscow streets, drugs and police.

In 2008 the group became the main headliner of the 1st day of the International Splash Festival!, in Russia carried out in Moscow in a big skatepark called "Adrenaline", the event was organized by Phlatline.

In the summer of 2009 Princip was arrested again. In June that same summer, rapper Guf left the group. The rapper declared his departure in an infamous interview.

At the end of 2009 rapper Slim released his debut album "Холодно" (Holodno / Cold) and a music video to the track of the same name. In October 2009, Ptaha a.k.a. Zanuda released his debut album "Ни о чем" (Ni o chom / About Nothing). In December 2009, Guf released his second album "Дома" (Doma / Homes).

On January 7, 2010 Ptaha a.k.a. Zanuda in an interview declared the group's disintegration. However, despite that, Centr tours (now just as Slim & Ptaha a.k.a. Zanuda) proceeded as planned. After the dissolution of the group the music video for the song, "Легко ли быть молодым" (Legko li byt' molodym / Is being young easy) was released. It was released because under the terms of the contract with the record label, Centr was supposed to record two music videos for their second album "Эфир в норме» (Efir v Norme / Broadcast's Normal). Each participant of the group were recorded separately, at different times and in different places so they didn't see each other (though Slim and Ptaha often crossed and hung out).

On November 3, 2011 after long transfers and collaborations, a collaboration album between a young music group called ‘Легенды ПРО’ (Legediu Pro/ Legends PRO) and the remaining members of Centr was in the works. The album was titled, "Легенды ПРО... Centr" ("Legends PRO(about)… Centr") and was finally released to positive critical reception. The simple album title is actually a careful wordplay on words, because "Pro" ("professional") also means "About" in Russian - so the title can be read as either "Legends PRO... (&) Centr" or "Legends (ABOUT) Centr".

In March, 2012 at the Hip-Hop Award Stadium “RUMA 2012” the album "Legends PRO… Centr" won the "Album Of the Year" and rapper Slim also won the nomination for "Rapper Of the Year".

In October 2014, rap.ru (one of the biggest rap-sites in Russia; similar to XXL in the US), published an interview with all of the three original members of Centr - Guf, Slim & Ptaha who after three years started recording together again.

In 2015 Centr as Guf, Slim & Ptaha have gone on a Russia-wide Concert tour. On September 21, when performing in Krasnoyarsk, Russia; Guf and Slim were arrested after the show and charged for "usage of drugs". A serious crime in Russia however both were released on September 27 with no further charges pressed. In 2016 Centr recorded their latest album «Система» (Sistema / The System).

In 2017 Guf & Slim came together to form the duo ‘GuSli’ and released 2 albums together. On June 15, 2017 they released the album “GuSli”. On November 17, 2017 they released the second “GuSli II” album. The artists came up with the names for both albums by combining the first letters of both artists pseudonyms.

== Discography ==
=== Albums ===
- 2007 - «Качели» (Kacheli/Swing)(Guf/Slim/Птаха)
- 2008 - «Эфир в норме» (Efir v norme /Ether's Аine)
- 2011 - «Легенды про… Centr» (Legendy pro ... centr / Legends about Centr) feat. Легенды про... (Legendy Pro)
- 2016 - «Система» (Sistema / The System)

=== Guf ===
- 2005 - «Подарок» (Podarok / Gift)
- 2007 - «Город дорог» (Gorod dorog / City of roads)
- 2009 - «Дома» - (Doma / At Home)
- 2010 - Basta/Guf (feat. Basta)
- 2012 - «Сам и...» (Sam i... / Myself and...). The name of the album is the allusion to the name of rapper's son (born in 2010) from his first wife Aiza (they were married in 2008-2014)
- 2014 - 420 (by Guf feat. Rigos, 2014). The name 420 is an allusion to the cannabis culture
- 2015 - «Ещё» (Yeshcho / Yet)
- 2017 - GuSli (feat. Slim). The name of the album created with the first letters of the pseudonyms
- 2017 - GuSli II (feat. Slim)

=== Ptaha (a.k.a. Zanuda) ===
- 2009 - «Ни о чём» (Ni o chom / Chit chat)
- 2010 - «Папиросы» (Papirosy / Cigarettes)
- 2012 - «Старые тайны» (Starie Tayny / Old Secrets)
- 2012 - «Три кита» (Tri Kita / Three Whales), featuring the homonymous group
- 2014 - «По низам» (Po Nizam / On the Bottom)
- 2014 - ЦАО, Vol.1 (TsAO, Vol.1)
- 2015 - ЦАО, Vol.2 (TsAO, Vol.2)
- 2015 - «Фитовой» (Fitovoy / Featurings)
- 2016 - «Бодрый» (Bodry / Sprightly)

=== Slim ===
- 2000 — «Без контрацепции…» (Bez Kontratseptcii / Without Contraception) feat. Smoky Mo
- 2003 — «Вы хотели правды?» (Vy Hoteli Pravdy / Did You Want the Truth?) feat. Smoky Mo
- 2004 — «Взрывное устройство» (Vzryvnoe Ustroystvo / The Explosive Device) feat. Smoky Mo
- 2006 — «Этажи» (Etazhi / The Floors) feat. Smoky Mo
- 2007 — «Лучшее 97-07» (The Best '97-07) feat. Smoky Mo
- 2009 - «Холодно» (Holodno / It's Cold)
- 2011 - «Отличай людей» (Otlichay lyudey / Distinguish people)
- 2011 - «Азимут» (Azimut) feat. Konstanta
- 2012 - «Весна-лето» (Vesna-Leto / Spring-Summer) (EP)
- 2012 - «Cen-Тропе» (CEN-TRope)
- 2013 - EP 2013, feat. Раскольников (Raskolnikov), Барбитурный (Barbiturny)
- 2014 - «Лото 33» (Lotto 33)
- 2014 - «Симфония номер 5» (The Symphony No. 5), feat. Affekt Solo
- 2014 - The Best
- 2015 - Погружение (Pogruzhenie / The Sinking), feat. AzimutZvuk
- 2015 - Погружение 2.0 (Pogruzhenie 2.0 / The Sinking 2.0), feat. AzimutZvuk
- 2016 - Ikra (Caviar)
- 2017 - GuSli (feat. Guf)
- 2017 - GuSli II (feat. Guf)
- 2017 - Погружение 3.0 (Pogruzhenie 3.0 / The Sinking 3.0), feat. AzimutZvuk
- 2018 - «Место под Солнцем» (Mesto pod Solntsem / The Place under the Sun)
- 2018 - «Место под Луной» (Mesto pod Lunoy / The Place under the Moon)

== Awards and nominations ==
- 2008: MTV Russia Music Award for Best Hip Hop Project (Centr feat. Basta "Gorod Dorog")
