= Jam Style & Da Boogie Crew =

Russian hip-hop group

Jam Style And Da Boogie Crew
- Genres: Hip hop
- Years active: 1998–2002
- Members: Alexander Merzlikin, Alexey Merzlikin, Konstantin "Masta BK" Bredis, Kirill "DJ Topor" Popov, Dmitry "Dimon-Gormon" Generalov, Alexey "Matras" Chernov
- Website: freestyle.azz.ru

Jam Style & Da Boogie Crew is a Russian hip-hop group formed in 1998 by breakdance crews Jam Style Crew from St. Petersburg and Da Boogie Crew from Moscow, although the individual groups themselves formed much earlier. The project existed for four years and released two studio albums: "You wanted to party" (2000) and "Everyone at the party" (2002).

In the fall of 1998, the team released a video for the song "Would You Like to Party?", which stayed on the MTV Russia charts for five months and marked the beginning of a new wave of hip-hop and breakdancing in Russia. The success was cemented by the team's appearance on famous youth TV shows in 1999 - " The Tower " on RTR and " Until 16 and Older... " on ORT - where the dancers held their breakdancing lessons. In 2001, they were replaced by the Fresh TV show on TV-6.

The teams are known for their performances at the annual German international breakdance championship Battle of the Year (BOTY), where the Merzlikins brothers from Jam Style Crew as part of the German team Flying Steps took third place in 1996. The teams also performed at the annual Russian sports and music festival Adidas Streetball Challenge from 1998 to 2001.

== History ==
The breakdance team Jam Style Crew was formed in St. Petersburg in 1995 by two Merzlikin brothers, Alexey (the elder) and Alexander (the younger), although others had been dancing since the early-1990s. Before that, the brothers danced in different groups but, in the Moscow scene, there was only one important group, B-People, so the need to make another group was high. The brothers had become well known within St. Petersburg and in 1989, became official background dancers for the rap group, 'Black and White.' In 1990, the group signed with the French label, 'Vingt Heures Productions,' and subsequently took a French tour. As their popularity grew, they left 'Black and White' which ultimately ended the group as a result.

Shortly after, the brothers joined another group, 'Bachelor Party,' but once the group broke up, in 1993 they formed their own rap-dance group, 'Children of the Swamps.' Although this attempt failed, they eventually formed 'Jam Style Crew' with Bredis Konstantin, and after having gone to Berlin in 1997, their domestic popularity in Russia grew at a phenomenal rate. While in Berlin, the Merzlikin brothers signed with the Berlin agency, 'CLC Berlin,' and gave dances in clubs around Berlin. Later on, however, after winning a major competition at the time, they took a German-based tour, and returned to Russia thereafter. As part of their growing popularity, in 1996, the group created a freestyle rap radio station, 'Station 106.8,' which ran for three years before being discontinued.

By the late-1990s, the 'Jam Style Crew' was everywhere and participating with well-known groups and artists like Mister Maloy and S.T.D.K, securing sponsorships and recording music videos as well. In 1999, the formal name, 'Jam Style And Da Boogie' (JS&DC) became the group's formal title, while the group's amount secured to five. That same year, they produced their very first music video, 'You Wanted A Party,' featuring long-time friend and colleague Zora Mikahilovna. After the video, Soviet DJ and father of teen rapper Detsl, Alexander Tolmatsky discovered the group and quickly signed a contract with them. However, it was later revealed it was about creating a group to popularize his son rather than help the group. The group continued to operate until 2000 when Konstantin "Masta BK" Bredis left and made his own group, 'Triathlon,' and in 2001 the group consolidated under the joint name, 'Da Boogie Crew.' The group would not be around for long as, in 2002, Alexey Merzlikin came to find out that their second album, 'Still At The Party,' had been illegally sold by Land Records. Further, other members had been performing on their own and not with the group. Thus, the Merzilkin brothers left the group.

== Members ==
=== Jam Style Crew ===
- Alexey Merzlikin (born December 2, 1970, Leningrad)
- Alexander Merzlikin (born November 19, 1972, Leningrad )
- 1993-2000: Konstantin "Masta BK" Bredis (born December 8, 1972, Leningrad)
- 1995-1997: Vladimir Bakatov (born December 1, 1974, Leningrad)

=== Da Boogie Crew ===
- Kirill " DJ Topor " Popov (born September 22, 1973, Moscow )
- Alexey "Mattress" Chernov (born September 14, 1974, Moscow)
- Dmitry "Dimon-Gormon" Generalov (born April 17, 1978, Moscow)
- 1995-1996:Anton "Kentosha/DJ Mixmaker" Sobko

== Discography ==
Jam Style & Da Boogie Crew

- 2000: We wanted a Party

Da Boogie Crew

- 2002: Still at the party (Da Boogie Crew)

Da Boogie DJ's

- 2000: Samplissimo (mixtape)
- 2001: B-Boy Funk Vol.1 (mixtape)
- 2001: Breakz Vol. 1 (mixtape)
- 2004: Remix album (Da Boogie DJ's (Топор и Гормон), Лигалайз и П-13)
- 2005: Breakz Mix (mixtape)
- 2005: Da Boogie DJ's (MP3)

== Videography ==
- 1998: “Did you want a party?”
- 1999: "The coolest" (Дельфин & Jam Style & Da Boogie Crew)
- 1999: "Dance with us"
- 2000: «Russian Funk»
- 2001: “They won’t catch us!”

== See also ==
- Russian hip hop
- Oxxxymiron
- Kasta
