= Detsl =

Russian rapper (1983–2019)

Detsl Децл
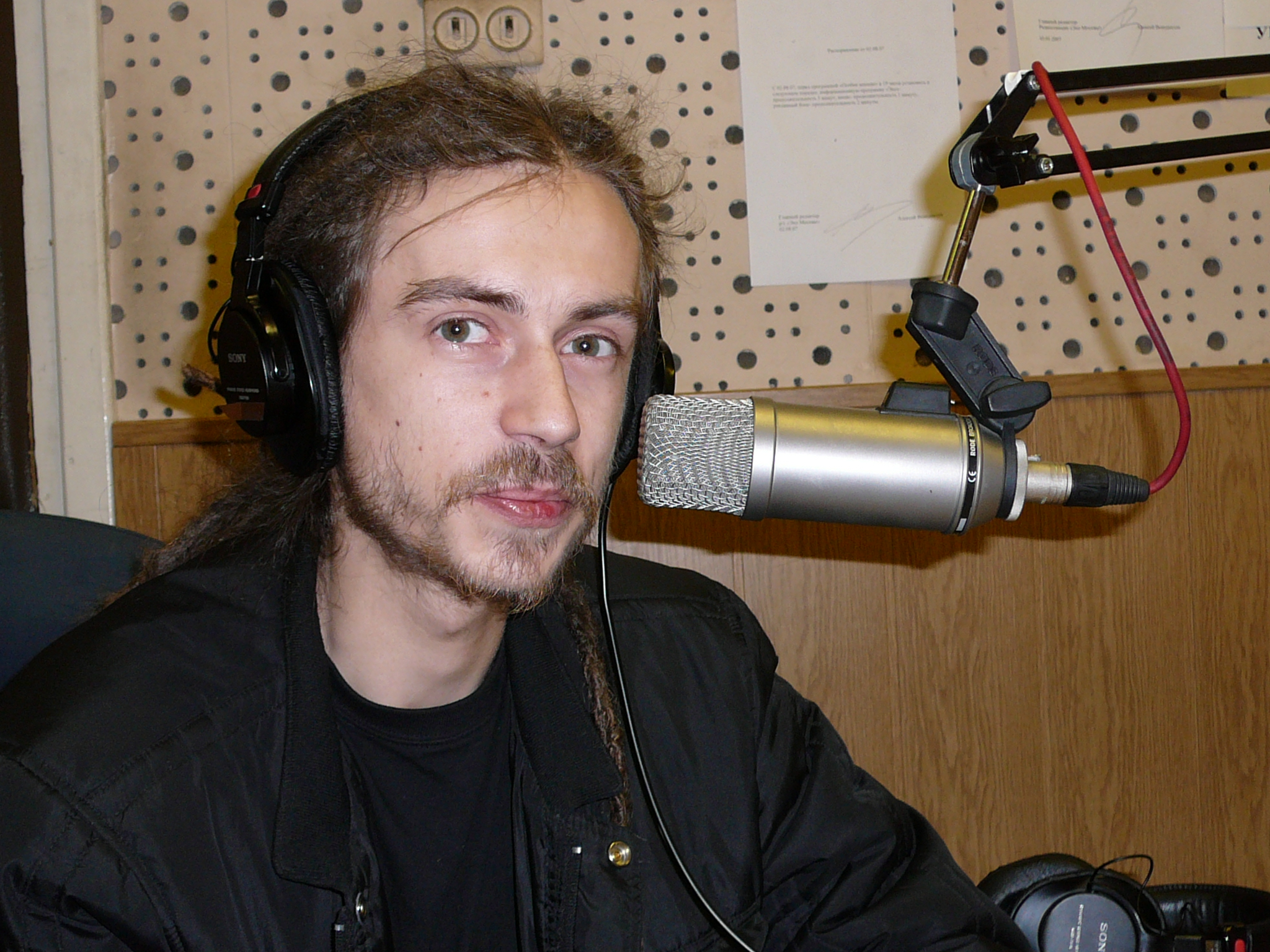
- Detsl in 2007

Background information
- Also known as: Detsl, Le Truk, Juzeppe Jostko
- Born: Kirill Aleksandrovich Tolmatsky; 22 July 1983; Moscow, Russian SFSR, Soviet Union
- Died: 3 February 2019 (aged 35) Izhevsk, Udmurtia, Russia
- Genres: Russian hip hop, reggae, ragga, spoken word
- Years active: 1999–2019

Kirill Aleksandrovich Tolmatsky (Russian: Кири́лл Алекса́ндрович Толмацкий; 22 July 1983 – 3 February 2019), better known by his stage names Detsl (Russian: Децл, from youth slang: "little", "small") and Le Truk, was a Russian hip hop artist.

== Biography ==
The son of Russian media producer and creative director Alexandr Tolmatsky (born 12 May 1983), he was born in Moscow, graduated from the British International School and then studied in Switzerland where he was introduced to hip hop music by a roommate and decided to become a rapper himself. Upon his return to Moscow, he launched his solo career under the guidance and mentorship of his father who co-produced his debut and a follow-up record. During that time, he also collaborated with the hip hop collective Bad Balance.

He made his debut on the Russian rap scene in 1999 under the stage name Detsl (a Russian slang word meaning 'a little, not much' from English "that's all", the only way to pronounce it with sounds available in Russian), releasing a track Friday along with a music video. In 2000, he released his debut album Who? You to massive success and quickly became a teen idol of the early 2000s in Russia. His song "Vecherinka" won an MTV Music Award in 2000 for International Viewer's Choice Award for MTV Russia.

In 2001, his second album Street Fighter was released. Having performed for three years as Detsl, he decided to distance himself from the early material, releasing his eponymous third record in 2004 as Le Truk. However, he returned to his previous stage name on the next two albums and used Detsl aka Le Truk moniker for all his releases starting from 2014. Detsl is also father of the artist juzeppe junior (Antoniy Kiselyov)

== Death ==
He died on 3 February 2019 in Izhevsk at the age of 35 from a sudden heart attack after performing his live set at a private birthday party. Coincidentally, he entertained the idea of faking his own death and disappearing at exactly the same age in the 2007 and 2015 interviews to news media agencies before the concert in the same city he would actually die in. The last post on Instagram was his own picture, written in oil on canvas, the inscription on it reads: "RIP RGB", and in the caption to the work explanation: conspiracy theory collection. The farewell ceremony was held on February 6 in Moscow at the Central Clinical Hospital of the Office of the Presidential Affairs. Tolmatsky was buried at the Pyatnitskoye Cemetery.

In 2021, a posthumous clay stop-motion animated music video for the track "Fibonacci (Requiem)" was released. It was directed and animated by Danylo Maliuha, founder of Lead Star Collective. The video is based on philosophical ideas of rebirth and digital legacy. The project received recognition at international film festivals, including Oregon Screams Horror Film Festival, Rising of Lusitania, and KinoDrome.

During production, behind-the-scenes footage was compiled into a documentary video, which includes excerpts of Detsl's voice and philosophical thoughts used as a narrative framework for the animation.

Danylo Maliuha also gave an interview as director and animator of the project, explaining its creation process and conceptual background.

== Discography ==
Original title	Transliterated title	Translation	Year of release
Кто? ты	Kto? ty	Who are You?	2000
Уличный боец	Ulichny boyets	Street Fighter	2001
aka Le Truk	---	---	2004
MosVegas 2012	---	---	2008
Здесь и сейчас	Zdes i seychas	Here and Now	2010
Dancehall Mania	---	---	2014
MXXXIII (10:33)	---	---	2014
Favela Funk EP	---	---	2016
Не важно, кто там у руля	Ne vazhno, kto tam u rulya	Doesn't Matter Who's In Charge There	2018
ТРИБЬЮТ	---	TRIBUTE	2025
