= DA-108 =

Russian rap band

- Origin: Saint Petersburg, Russia
- Genres: Rap; Hip hop; Hardcore rap; Oldschool rap
- Years active: 1992–present
- Labels: Rap Recordz; Zvezda Records; МедиаТон; Studio 149; MamaPapa
- Members: Roman Alexeev aka Cooper †; Pavel Pachkay aka DJ-108
- Past members: Fux; A-Tone; DJ Keet

DA-108 is a rap group from Saint Petersburg, Russia, formed in 1992 by Pavel Pachkay (DJ-108) and Roman "Cooper" Alexeev. A distinctive feature of the group is a strong emphasis on flow and a frivolous attitude toward lyrical content; this approach led to the coining of the term "wack style" (the style of nonsense).

== History ==
=== Foundation ===
Pavel Pachkay, also known as "DJ 108," was born in 1973 in Leningrad, Soviet Union (now Saint Petersburg). In his childhood and youth, he was engaged in breakdancing. In January 1990, Pavel went to study in the US for a month on an exchange program. During that time, he discovered and later became interested in rap and hip-hop. In 1991, he entered the institute and met Anton "Fux," a famous breakdancer in Saint Petersburg. They subsequently decided to create a rap group. Fux was a lyric writer, and Pavel composed the music. The name DA-108 appeared after the members read the article "Solving a Strange Number." Lacking professional equipment, the group made its first records in a home studio on a tape recorder. They used a Soviet "LEL" drum machine and samples from southern hip-hop. The recorded demo album consists of 10 tracks.

In 1992, they purchased a Yamaha drum machine and a Lomo microphone, and they began to record their second album. After some performances, Fux left the group in 1993. In the summer of 1993, DJ 108 met Rasim from the Academy-2 group. Thanks to Rasim, Pavel starred in the video «Буду погибать молодым» (Budu pogibat molodym/To die young) of Mister Maloy MC.

In 1994, DJ 108 met Roman Alexeev (also known as "Cooper") of the group S.M.D. on a basketball court. Cooper became the third member of DA-108. DJ-108 invited Cooper to contribute a verse to the track "Moskovsky Gulyaka" (Moscow Reveller), which featured the poetry of Sergey Esenin set to music from a hit by the group Malchishnik. March 8, 1994, was the first date of performance of this song.

The group toured St. Petersburg and Moscow, performing various songs at festivals and promotional events. The author of all lyrics was DJ-108, except for the track «Я хочу сказать» (I want to say) by Cooper. Lyrics of DA-108 were strongly influenced by the absurdist poetry of Daniil Charms. This style was named wack style—the style of nonsense. The flow and music of DA-108 were influenced by old-school rap groups such as Ultramagnetic MCs, House of Pain, Naughty by Nature, and Das EFX. The signature feature of DA-108's lyrics was using quotes from Soviet films.

In 1994, the group was invited to the concert «Stop The Violence» by Academy-2 group, organized by Vlad Valov. Later, DA-108 performed at the Rap Music 1994 festival, where they took second place behind the group I.F.K. That year, the group gave its first interview to 5TV. In 1995, DJ-108 purchased a computer and recorded new tracks for the group; the following year, DA-108 took first place at the Rap Music 1996 Fest.

=== DA-108 Flava conflict with Fux ===
DA-108 was making way for rap in St. Petersburg clubs, which allowed new teams to appear on the stage, co-opting young rappers to DA-108 Flava. In 1994, Cooper began selling rap cassettes near the Gorkovskaya metro station. After DJ Kefir created radio advertisements for the business, many St. Petersburg rappers gravitated toward Cooper. They formed the group «DA-108 Flava» aka Горьковская туса (Gorkovskaya Tusa). This creative association included a lot of rap collectives: «X-team», «Адреналин» (Adrenaline), «ЧП», «D-Story», «Невский Бит (Nevsky Beat)», «Зелёный Синдром» (Zeleny sindrom / Green Syndrome), «Ikambi Gwa Gwa», A-Tone and others. In the future, many famous artists came out of this Association, for example, Smoky Mo and Krip-A-Krip.

In November 1996, with the support of Vlad Valov, the broadcast "Hip-Hop Info" (Хип-Хоп Инфо) appeared on Radio Record with DJ-108 and Anton Fux as hosts. At the same time, Fux created a new project: Baltic Clan with STDK, Papa Gus and other rappers.

=== 1998-2003 years ===
The debut LP ''Дорога на восток'' (''Doroga na Vostok'' / ''Road to the East'') was released on cassette on 21 May 1999. This is a collection of songs from the period from 1992 to 1998. Then, on 15 October 1999, the album was released on CD by the label Zvezda Records. In 2007, the album was included in a list of main Russian rap albums from 1999 by the rap.ru portal.

In 1998, DJ-108 and DJ Tonic created the broadcast «ХОП-инфо» (Hop-info) on the radio «ПОРТ FM» (PORT FM), but it didn't last very long. In the late 1998, DJ-108 opened record label «МАМАПАПА» (Mamapapa / Motherfather) where he recorded young mc's and created radio spots.

In 1999, DJ Keet joined to DA-108 collective. 23 August 2000 was released a video by track «Праздник Эй-Тона (Say 26)» (Prazdnik Ey-Tona / A-Tone's holiday) was made in 1999. This track was a birthday gift for rapper A-Tone from DA-108 Flava. Despite the small budget and home-made quality, the video hit the chart rotation of MTV Russia in September 2000. 10 September 2000 the group performed on «Adidas Streetball Challenge 2000» fest.

At the end of 2000, DJ-108 relocated in Moscow, where he worked under sound production of Bad B. Alliance artists. From 2001 to 2002, he recorded his second album. In 2003, Pavel returned to Saint Petersburg. In 2003, was released a video by track «Все Вместе» (Vse vmeste / All together) feat «Триатлон» (Triatlone) group.

=== 2004-2014 years ===
The group's second LP, ''Комбинатор'' (''Combinator''), was released on 6 July 2004. The LP was full of samples and quotes from Soviet films - phrases of the great Combinator Ostap Bender and other cinematic characters as comments and interludes of tracks. Some tracks were created on poems of Sergey Esenin and Daniil Kharms.

I spent a long time collecting material. The oldest tracks are : «Новый год(Novy God / New Year)», «Праздник Эйтона ( A-Tone holiday)», «Чёрная Кошка (Chernaya Koshka / Black cat)». Songs are written and accumulated slowly. These songs were written almost in 1998…The last songs were written faster — I learned to work with sound, because there is no Director's education, only courses, thanks to the Screw for the help. «Чёрная Кошка» it was written in General for a whole year. It was associated with certain events in my life, I was there for a long time the text was forced, the music. I learned to work with life sampler. I lost my voice. I should have ended my career ща MC in winter 1999. Went two months of silence. I lost my voice on this song. I was almost electrocuted. Then I put my voice on the same song for three months. It's been almost a year and I wrote it down. With each song in a different way. So five years passed.

— DJ-108

In 2009 DJ-108 was interviewed for a documentary series «Хип-Хоп В России: от 1-го Лица» (Russian hip-hop from the first Person).

=== 2014-2020 years ===
Since 2014 to 2019 DJ-108 was a judge of Versus Battle YouTube show including battle Oxxxymiron vs Johnyboy 12 April 2015.

In 2016 album «Дорога на Восток» was remastered on vinyl by label «To Russia with Love».

In 2017, Pavel published a video from 1992 where some famous Russian rappers (DA-108, Bad Balance, Mister Maloy) rapped and danced together in an underpass.

In 2017 DA-108 and «Зелёный Синдром» (Zeleny sindrom / Green Syndrome) group performed the opening act of House Of Pain in SPB.

On 30 March 2018 an album «Питерский олдскул» («St. Petersburg oldschool») was released, including a lot of old unreleased tracks and some new material. This year DJ-108 participated on the solo album «Триумф» (Triumph) of Vasily Vasin from Kirpichi.

In 2019 honor of the twentieth anniversary was remastered on vinyl single «Праздник Эй-Тона» (Say 26). Also DJ-108 gave some interview for some YouTube hip-hop blogs.

On 23 May 2020, Cooper suffocated from carbon monoxide as a result of a fire in his apartment on the eighth floor of a building in the Vyborg district of SPB. Alexeev died alongside his 62-year-old mother, Lyudmila. DJ-108 told in interviews for some media about the last years of Cooper's life and discussed his problems with alcohol.

11 June 2020 was released fourth LP «Это все не то» (Чужие 2005-2011) (Eto vse ne to (chuzhie 2005-2001) / It's all wrong (strangers 2005-2011)) consists of old unreleased tracks from 2005 to 2011.

22 June 2020 was released single «Бери шинель» (Beri shinel / Take your greatcoat).

1 July 2020 Bad Balance, DJ-108 and Lojaz released video for track «Высоко на небесах» (Vysoko na nebesah / High in the sky), devoted the memory of Cooper.

== Discography ==
=== DA-108 ===
- 1999 — «Дорога на Восток» (Doroga na Vostok/Road to the East)
- 2004 — «Комбинатор» (Combinator)
- 2018 — «Питерский олдскул» («St. Petersburg oldschool»)
- 2020 — «Это все не то» (Чужие 2005-2011) (Eto vse ne to (chuzhie 2005-2001) / It's all wrong (strangers 2005-2011))

=== DA-108 Flava ===
- 2000 — «Мама Папа» (Mama Papa / Mother Father)
- 2001 — «Первомайский рэп» (Pervomaisky rap / First may rap)
- 2004 — «Однажды в Питере» (Odnajdy v pitere / Once upon a time in St. Petersburg)

=== DJ-108 ===
==== Mixtapes ====
- 1999: А Вот Так! (A vot tak! / And Here It Is!). (1999)
- 2005: А Вот Так! (A vot tak! / And Here It Is!). (remastered) (2005)
- 2000: Breaking (2000) ft. Dj Keet
- 2005: Breaking №1 (remastered) ft. Dj Keet
- 2002: заМЕШАТЕЛЬство (zaMESHATELstvo / confusion) (2002)
- 2004: Party Up! (Boombastik Sound) (2004)
- 2004: The Best Of Hip-Hop 2004 (2004)
- 2004: Электротовары (Electrotovary / Electric appliances) (Electric Boogie Mix) (2004)
- 2004: Электротовары 2 (Electrotovary-2 / Electric appliances-2) (Electric Boogie Mix) (2004) ft. Dj Dark
- 2004: Back To Da Real Hip-Hop Of 90's... (2004)
- 2005: United Colors Of R`n`B (2005) 2CD ft Dj R-Beat
- 2005: In Da Club (R`n`B Mix) (2005)
- 2006: Hip Hop Muzic (Hip-Hop Mix), Dj Dark - Мемуары (Old School Techno Mix) (2006) 2CD
- 2006:«R’N’B Classic» (DJ 108 & DJ Dollar)
- 2006: «DJ 108» (MP3)
- 2007:«Битва при клаустрофобусе» (Bitva pri klaustrofobuse / Battle at cloustrofobous) (DJ 108)
- 2007:«Hip-Hop 1» (DJ 108 Chart)

==== No Face Crew ====
- 1999 — «DJ DJ DJ» (No Face Crew: Тоник (Tonik), Штакет (Shtaket), 108)

== Videography ==
- 2000: Праздник Эй-Тона (Say 26) (Prazdnik Ey-Tona / A-Tone's holiday)
- 2003: «Все Вместе» (Vse vmeste / All together) feat «Триатлон» (Triatlone)
