= Ptaha =

Russian hip-hop artist

David Nuriev, stage name Ptaha (Птаха "little bird" in Russian; born June 10, 1981, in Baku) is a Russian hip hop artist. Ptaha is a former member of the hip hop group Centr.

== Discography ==
- 2007 - The Trail of Emptiness
- 2009 - "About Nothing"
- 2010 - Cigarettes
- 2012 - Old Secrets
- 2014 - "Po Nizam"
- 2015 - Fitovoy
- 2016 - "Bouncy"
- 2017 - For Peace

== Filmography ==
- Brother 3 (2024)

== See also ==
- Russian hip hop
