= Zveri =

Russian rock band

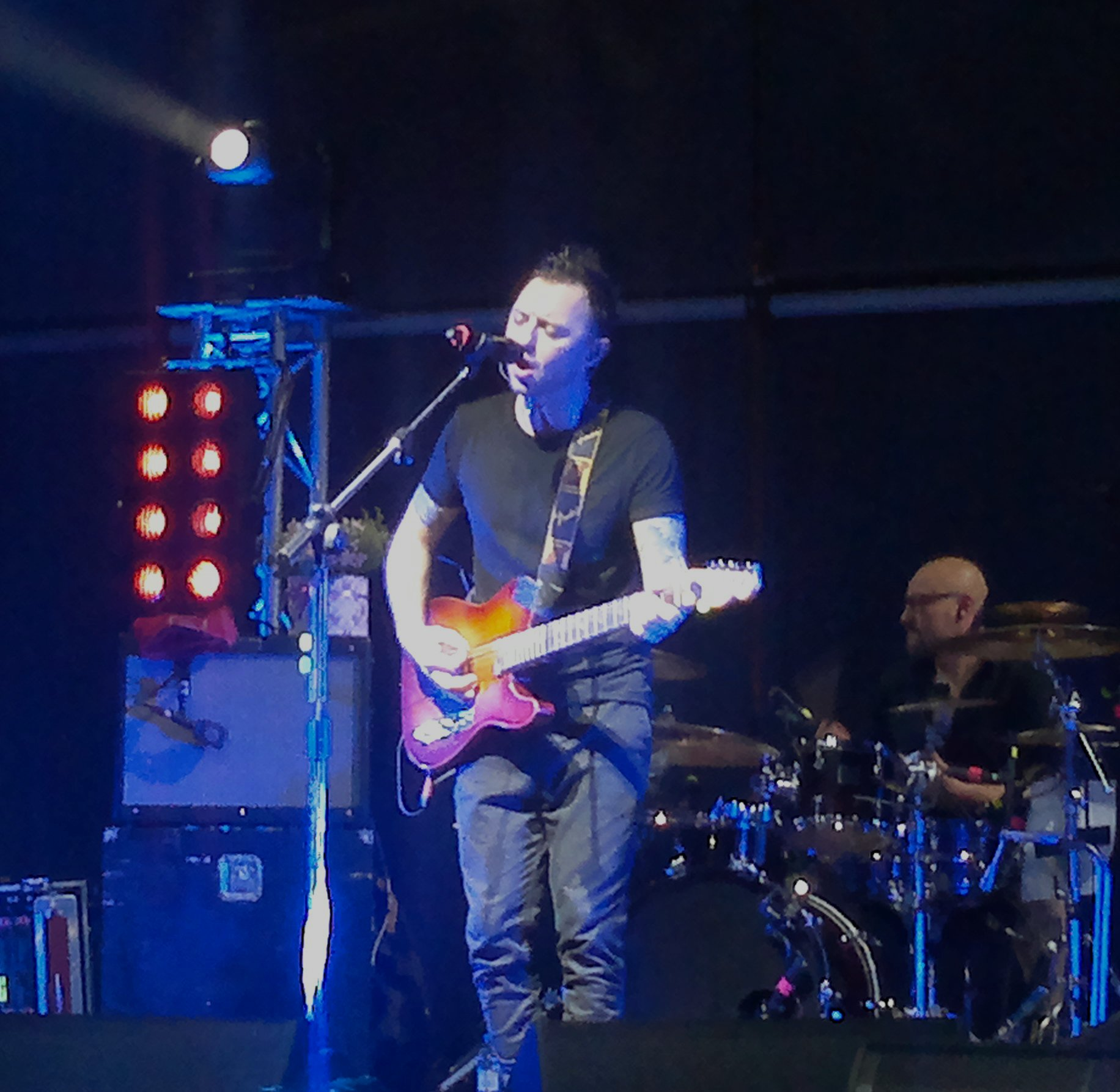
- Zveri in Baku (Azerbaijan)

Background information
- Origin: Taganrog, Russia
- Genres: Rock, alternative rock, pop rock
- Years active: 2001–present
- Label: Navigator
- Members: Roman "Zver'" Bilyk; Kirill Antonenko; Maksim Leonov; Kostantin Labezkiy; Misha Kraev
- Website: zve.ru

Zveri (Beasts; Russian: Звери) is a Russian rock band.

== Biography ==
Zveri was formed in mid 2002 by Roman Bilyk, the lead singer of the band, better known as Roma Zver'. The band was named after his nickname. He was soon joined by Maksim Leonov on guitars, Kostya Labezkiy on the bass, Kirill Antonenko on keyboards and Misha Kraev on the drums and the group began work on their debut album Golod (Hunger), released in February 2003. This album contained many of the group's best-known songs, such as Dozhdi-Pistolety (Rain-Guns), Dlya Tebya (For You) and Prosto Takaya Sil'naya Lyubov' (Simply such a strong love).

In March 2004, Zveri released their second album, entitled Rayony-Kvartaly (Regions-districts). It sold well and was accompanied by a tour of the country to promote it. Vsyo, chto kasaetsya (All, that is about) was released as a single from it and standout tracks include Yuzhnaya Noch' (Southern Night) and Napitki Pokrepche (Stronger Drinks). In 2005 the group released a remix album for songs from Golod and Rayony, Kvartaly.

March 2006 saw the release of the group's third album, Kogda my vmeste, nikto ne kruche (When we are together, no one is cooler), from which Do skoroi vstrechi (See you soon) was released as a single. Zveri's 4th studio album, Dalshe (Further) was released in November 2008. Zveri song "Kvartira" is featured in the Grand Theft Auto IV video game.

In November 2008, the group causes a scandalous incident during the RMA awards on the MTV Russia channel, with Roman Bilyk using inappropriate middle finger gestures and the guitar player Maksim Leonov breaking his guitar with an insignia "No more rock on RMA".

== Discography ==
- 2003 - Голод (Golod, Hunger)
- 2004 - ''Районы-кварталы'' (Rayoni-kvartali, Districts and Blocks)
- 2005 - Зверимиксы (Zverimiksy, Zverimixes)
- 2005 - Караоке (Karaoke)
- 2006 - Когда мы вместе, никто не круче (Kogda mi vmeste, nikto ne kruche; When We're Together, No One is Better)
- 2008 - Дальше (Dal'she, Further)
- 2009 - Акустика (Akustika, Acoustics)
- 2011 - Музы (Muzi, Muses)
- 2013 - Лучшие (Luchshiye, The Best)
- 2014 - Один на один (Odin na odin, One on One)
- 2014 - Всё лучшее в одном (Vso luchsheye v odnom, All Best in One)
- 2015 - Саундтрек к сериалу «Майские ленты» (OST Mayskiye Lenty)
- 2016 - Страха нет (Strakha net, No Fear)
- 2017 - Друзья по палате (Druz'ya po palate, Friends of the House)
- 2018 - Вино и космос (Vino i kosmos, Wine and Cosmos)
- 2018 - 10
- 2018 - Звери в зоопарке (саундтрек к фильму «Лето») (Zveri v zooparke, Beasts at the Zoo) (OST Leto)
- 2019 - У тебя в голове (U tebya v golove, In Your Head)
- 2020 - Одинокому везде пустыня (Odinokomu vezde pustynya, For the lonely, everywhere is a desert")
- 2020 - Звери на карантине (Zveri na karantine, Beasts in Quarantine)
- 2021 - Очень (Ochen', Very)
- 2023 - На синем трамвае (Na sinem tramvaye, On the Blue Tram)
