= Husky (rapper) =

Russian rapper (born 1993)

Husky Хаски
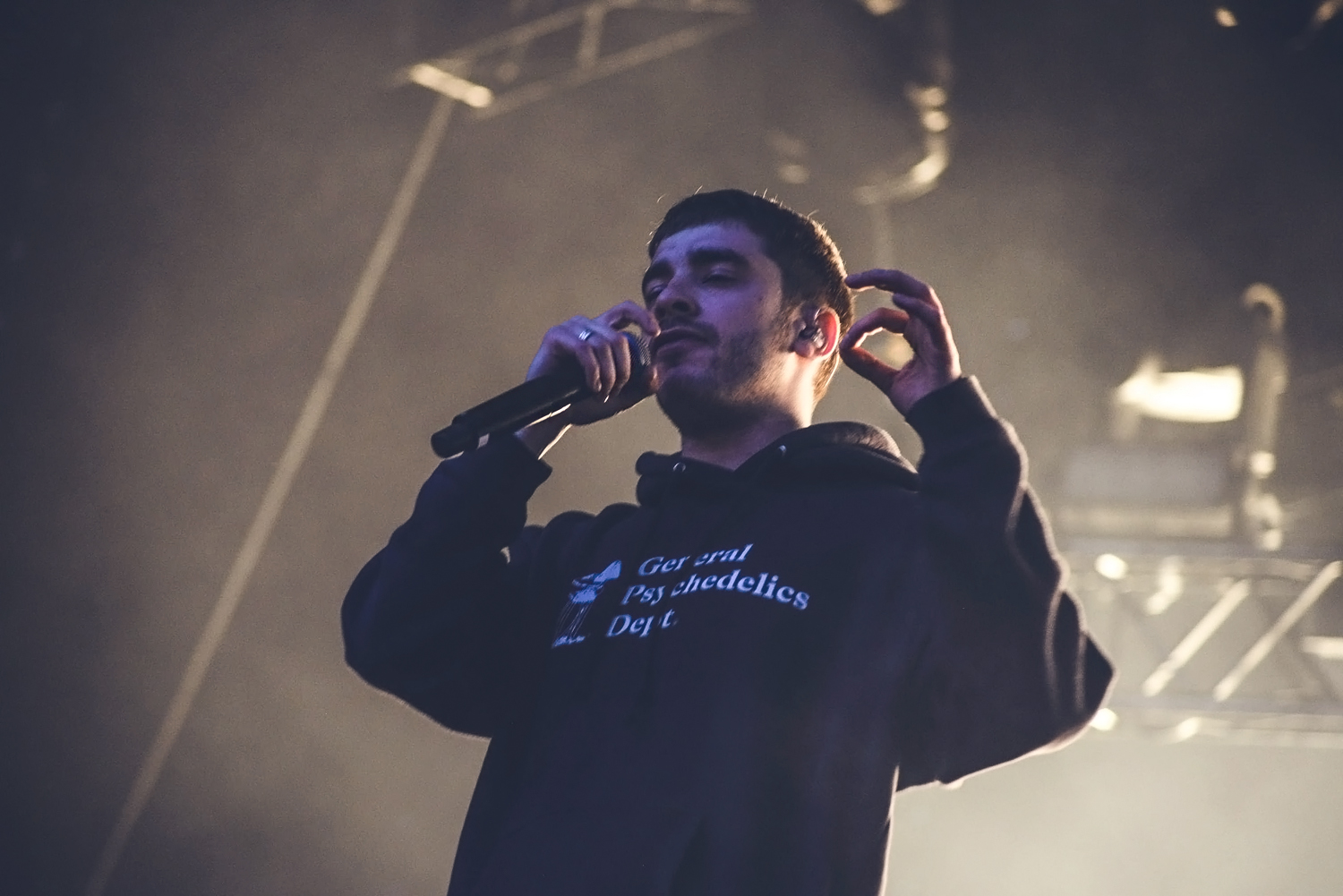
- Husky performing at Stereoleto on Vasilyevsky Island, 2020

Background information
- Born: Dmitry Nikolayevich Kuznetsov; February 10, 1993 (age 33); Irkutsk, Russia
- Origin: Ulan-Ude, Russia
- Genres: Hip hop; alternative hip hop; punk rock
- Occupation: Rapper
- Years active: 2011–present
- Spouse: Alina Nasibullina
- Website: husky2025.com

Dmitry Nikolayevich Kuznetsov (Russian: Дми́трий Никола́евич Кузнецо́в; born February 10, 1993), better known by his stage name Husky (Russian: Хаски), is a Russian rapper from Ulan-Ude. His music is known for its use of somber and evocative lyricism, complex rhyming schemes, and musical techniques like assonance and alliteration. His provocative songs are known for being poetically contradictory to his gopnik image.

== Early life ==
Dmitry Nikolayevich Kuznetsov was born on February 10, 1993, in Irkutsk, Siberia. He moved to Buryatia when he was three months old. At the age of three, he was taught to read using Russian classical literature and at four years old, he was formally baptized, although his mother frequented both Christian churches and Buddhist datsan.

When he started going to school, he moved to Ulan-Ude to live with his mother after living with his aunt in the countryside. He was raised in the Vostochny microdistrict of Ulan-Ude, to which he later devoted the song "Поэма о Родине" (Poema o Rodine/Poem about Motherland). In 2021, he released the song " За Байкалом" (Za Baikalom/Behind the Baikal) dedicated to his life and family in Buryatia. He began writing and performing rap music at the age of 15.

In 2010, when he was 16 years-old, Dmitry Kuznetsov moved from Ulan-Ude to Moscow, passed the Russian language Unified State Exam and began attending Moscow State University's Faculty of Journalism. He lived in Moscow State University's The Residence Hall for Postgraduate Students and Trainee (DAS), where he lived for the next five years.

In 2010, his first year of study at Moscow State University, Kuznetsov worked as a journalist at NTV, VGTRK, and Russia-1, the main, state-funded news channel in Russia. At Russian-1, he worked as a censor for televised, on-screen content: "My duties included watching Ukrainian and European channels and looking for bloopers in their reports, so that later they could be broadcast on the air." This made him desire to make up his own mind and become a journalist, even a war correspondent, and travelled to places like Novorossiya and Donetsk.

It was in 2011, however, when he started becoming politically involved. He started going to opposition protests (2011-2013), a three-year period of concurrent demonstrations and counter-demonstrations across Russia gestated by the government participation in election fraud and rampant abuse of power to control and silence political oppositional leaders. He has stated that protesting among the youth at the time was in vogue and many were there because it was thing to do. But he states that he was there in earnest and his participation in these protests started to show him the societal divides in Russia from a first-person perspective. In 2013, his solo career would begin with his debut album "Sbch life" which referenced the sociopolitical dynamics of the Snow Revolution, Putin, and his views on political oppositionist Alexei Navalny.

In an Interview with The Village in 2016, he stated that he did not finish his degree at Moscow State University and left early without completing the requirements to graduate because of the changing tides of Russian society and his feeling that it was no longer necessary. Because the internal political situation was becoming so highly anxious, he felt he no longer needed or wanted to complete the program.

== Middle life ==
Once leaving University in 2015, he began pursuing rap as a career. In 2016, he stated that he was making very little on rap and living modestly off his earnings. He took odd music jobs, for instance working at the ticket control station for a Big Russian Boss concert, the concert in question occurring in November of that year.

Because Russia's main populations live in approximately 10 cities, of which Moscow is one of them with a population of 12,678,080 people making it the 11th most populous city on Earth, Kuznetsov had said that he felt trapped within the city. He had also said that because the plane fare was expensive, he was unable to go home to Ulan-Ude, although as of 2021 he has visited home multiple times, as evidenced by an Instagram post from October 16, 2020 and his song, 'Beyond Baikal,' whose cover-art feature him back in his native home.

== Political views ==
Kuznetsov professes bipartisan attitudes and anti-positional sentiments, refusing to conform to a left/right identity. He has stated the way he perceives politics is through an artistic lens and does what he feels. He believes that Crimea belongs to Russia (annexation of Crimea by the Russian Federation), although he does not consider himself a Putin supporter. He has also shown his sympathy through words and in-person visitation for the Separatist, Russian military leader Arsen Pavlov, otherwise known as 'Motorola.'

He has shown support for Russian writers like Zakhar Prilepin, award-winning author and former member of the banned National Bolshevik Party and Eduard Limonov, provocative emigre author and original founder of the National Bolshevik Party. Husky shares a cordial friendship with Prilepin, regarding him as his friend and 'older comrade.' Notable anti-corruption politician and lawyer Alexei Navalny has expressed public support for the rapper, although according to Kuznetsov's appraisal, has distanced himself from certain expressed views such as the rapper's stance on the DPR (Donetsk People's Republic). Kuznetsov had said he shows no sympathy for him.

Kuznetsov has shown scorn for politicians like Boris Nemtsov, a former Yeltsin-era liberal politician, due to his transitive beliefs, the rapper equating it to 'prostitution.' Other include Vitaly Milonov, Orthodox Duma Member, and Yelena Mizulina, controversial Parliament Member, Kuznetsov calling them 'either clowns or crazy.' He is also interested in Russian history and states the need to learn from the past. He cites Stalin as one who cannot be vilified or praised, and only studied and understood. He has also stated he cannot to current Duma members due to their impropriety and media-based narratives.

== Career ==
At the beginning of his career, prior to releasing independent music, in 2010 Husky and fellow contemporary rapper bollywood FM formed the group, 'Just Rhymes,' and released the album, 'Impressed,' in 2010. Many of the tracks were unreleased at the time.

In 2011, Kuznetsov released "Седьмое октября" (October 7) on YouTube, a track which rapidly gained attention due to its title and lyrics - which reference Vladimir Putin's birthday and address major social and political issues in Russia. In 2013, Kuznetsov released his first album under the name Husky, "сбчь жзнь" (sbch' zhzn'/dg lfe). By 2014, Kuznetsov became acquainted with the writer Zakhar Prilepin, who collaborated with him and REECH, another Russian rapper, on the track "Пора валить" (Pora valit'/Time to go).

In 2016, Kuznetsov began releasing music videos for his second studio-recorded album, "Любимые песни (воображаемых) людей" (Lyubimyye pesni (voobrazhayemykh) lyudei/Favorite songs of (imaginary) people). The album was released on April 1, 2017, and became one of the most popular music albums released in the Russian Federation at the time.

Since 2017, Kuznetsov has been active within the cinematic world along with his rapping career. His first project, 'Psychotronics,' was a thriller short film and premiered in Russia on December 10, 2017. Shortly thereafter, he would create three more film projects, although in 2019 the Russian-language documentary, 'BEEF: Russian Hip Hop'[rus] would help engender more dynamic cinematic endeavors. In July 2019, Kuznetsov released the short film, 'Lucifer,' in partnership with directors Pavel Karykhalin and Alexey Shevchenko. Detailing his internal grappling with the difficulties of fame and alienation from his sense of self, the film displayed Kuznetsov's struggles with the attention national fame brings.

In March 2018, he performed for the first time in Kaliningrad at the Yalta club.

On April 18, 2018, Kuznetsov released the audio and music video for the track "Иуда" (Iuda/Judas). On November 17, 2018, YouTube blocked the music video for Russian audiences without further explanation. By the fall of 2019, Kuznetsov released "Люцифер" (Lyutsifer/Lucifer), a mockumentary about Kuznetsov's work that premiered in Moscow. His third album, "Хошхоног" (Khoshkhonog), was released on September 25, 2020. As with Kuznetsov's prior work, the album deals directly with controversial political issues in the Russian Federation, including the presidency of Vladimir Putin. Khoshkhonog is a traditional Buryat dish, made of cooked lamb or horse intestine.

== Family ==
Dmitry Kuznetsov is married to Russian film and theatre actress Alina Nasibullina, and is confirmed to have one daughter named Katerina. Little to nothing is known about the relationship, as the rapper does not post photos together with his wife nor his child on his personal social-media. Husky's track 'Song for K', released on May 5 of 2020, is dedicated to his daughter. The two met when Alina was still enrolled at The Moscow Art Theater School, but by 2018, the couple was already officially married. The couple was seen in Husky's self-produced film "Psychotronics" the same year, confirming the engagement. In 2018, it was confirmed that Alina had gotten pregnant. In November 2020, Alina began posting photos of her with Dmitry, along with their daughter.

== 2018 incidents ==
In the fall of 2018, following two, domestic terrorist attacks, the Kerch Polytechnic College massacre and the Arkhangelsk FSB office bombing, the role of rap in Russian society was reevaluated and a crackdown on the genre ensued, leading to performance cancellations, police intimidation, and even jailtime. Because the assailants were minors, President Vladimir Putin considered their radicalism a reaction to the influx of Western globalization' and the violent tendencies of 'Western subculture.' The decision to ban performances of notable groups like IC3PEAK, FriendZone, FACE, Allj, Gone.Fludd, and Kuznetsov was fueled by both state rhetoric that rap music promotes suicide, drug addiction, Satanism, extremism' and treason, Putin's main problem with the genre being its promotion of drug use, while actual shutdowns were instigated by family-first, moral/ethical advocacy groups like Anti-Dealer, Common Cause and the What is Good Project. In total, more than 36 concerts were cancelled in a three-month period from October to December, often on charges of child protection claims and content violations. As of February 2019, there has been no other hip-hop cancellations.

=== September suicide and funeral ===
On September 10, 2018, Kuznetsov announced in a now deleted Instagram post that his slated Album Gospel of a Dog, a theoretical nine-track conceptual album about the prophet Jesus's hypothetical experience of walking around Moscow in the 2010s, was scrapped, except for one song, Judas / Иуда. Kuznetsov explained that he was becoming too distracted by other's expectations and demands of him and wanted to become his own boss again. He also posted a video of him breaking his PC. These events sparks much controversy and many could not predict what was to come.

On September 11, Kuznetsov officially released the concept for the Album, and reiterated his need to step away from the project. "Now everything will be different. Today I made a key decision in my life." He also released the cover-art and the scrapped track-list, whose first letter of every song formed the Russian word for gospel (Евангелие / Yevangelie / jevangjẽlije). In the picture of the song-list, clues were present about future song releases, namely 'Vital Flow' and 'Man on the Internet.' Also included was the word Mash, the Russian news publication that would be first to report on Kuznetsov's future 'suicide' off a balcony at the Moscow Ritz Carlton Hotel later the week.

On September 12 [or possibly 13th], Kuznetsov released another Instagram post of a clip from a previous GQ interview. In this video, he made a cynical observation of the biblical practice of animal sacrifice. "There is such a funny thing - sacrifice. This is when a person of antiquity comes to the temple, to the altar, and instead of sacrificing himself, as expected, he brings some kind of dummy - an animal or something else. God or gods look at all this and say that everything is in order, play along. It's funny. "

On September 13, Kuznetsov staged his infamous 'suicide' off the balcony of a suite at the Moscow Ritz Carlton Hotel, using a lifelike mannequin dressed in the same crimson tracksuit worn in a previous GQ interview, as a body double. The event had been preplanned and in the GQ Interview, Kuznetsov had alluded to this demonstration through protestations of corporatism and stylists monotony, "If I were really a rapper now, then I would probably commit suicide." Kuznetsov had called this event an 'act of art,' but had strongly denied its planning. Because of the mannequin's lifelike quality, the police were called and later found that Kuznetsov's friend Ruslan Khartayev had been involved. However, no further police action was taken. Many believed the event to be part of a publicity stunt for Kuznetsov's 2018 Leprosy Tour and a theory arose that the events were following a liturgical path, specifically charting Jesus Christ's persecution, crucifixion, and ascension.

On September 14, a continuation of the 2017 GQ Russia interview with the rapper was first released, initially by Kuznetsov and then by GQ through official channels. In the video-clip, he condemned the genre of rap for its subversive control of identity and had dictated the rapper as a 'sorcerer,' who live on the edges of good and evil.

On September 15, Kuznetsov announced a mock funeral to mark the death of his former estranged self, the symbolic event dubbed a 'farewell service'. The appearance of Kuznetsov's fictitious death seemed to crystallize the postulated biblical narrative, the events chronologically analogous to the three-day Paschal Triduum. He announced via his VKontakte that the funeral was to take place at 3:30 pm in the Big Hall of the Stimul Palace of Culture, in Moscow, and was to be made public and livestreamed. In the evening, the rapper was seen performing alongside rapper bollywoodFM in the famous Moscow club Pravda.

On September 16, Kuznetsov's symbolic, public funeral took place and garnished massive social-media attention, the term Husky trending on Russian Twitter and the official Instagram livestream reaching well over 8,000 viewers. The public was able to come, show their respects with flowers or wreaths, and take photos, in some cases kiss the forehead, of the rapper, who sat motionless in his coffin and occasionally opened his eyes to look around. The funeral started in the late morning and lasted about one hour, being preceded by a formal, vehicular funerary procession. An accompanying presenter cryptically orated Kuznetsov's goal through the week's many events, namely the hope of discarding his contrived identity as a rapper for a more autonomous variant.

"Stage one: the theft and destruction of X materials. Purpose: to get rid of the need to be through the destruction of rap. Stage two: the sacrifice of x. Purpose: to deceive God by sacrificing X instead of himself as a sacred sacrifice by hanging. Stage three: farewell to X. Purpose: to continue to deceive God by arranging a public ceremony of farewell to X, "

=== Cancellations, arrest, and release ===
On September 22, Kuznetsov announced his 4-month, 40 city 'Leprosy Tour,' which was slated to cover the expanse of Russia, from far-East Siberia to inner-city St. Petersburg. Following his Tomsk performance on October 4, he released his rock EP 'Triptych about Human Flesh,' containing three songs which had not been included on the scrapped Album. However, after having toured for four weeks unbothered, the first (Kerch Polytechnic College massacre) of two domestic terrorist attacks would significantly alter Kuznetsov's future tour plans. From October 26, 2018, to December 2, 2018, Kuznetsov, along with numerous other rappers and groups like FriendZone, Allj, IC3PEAK, and Gone.Fludd, would have numerous concerts cancelled on charges of child endangerment and claims of extremist content under the auspices of Russia's 2010 Law #436-FZ, while faulty plumbing and electrical codes would cancel Kuznetsov's later concerts. Despite previously outspoken animosity from Russian state officials towards the rap genre, the 2018 cancellations primarily came from 'family' organizations like Common-Cause, the infamous group Anti-Dealer founded by ex-LDPR member Dmitry Nosov, and the What is Good project.

In late November 2018, concert cancellations would reach its zenith, many rappers including Kuznetsov having numerous performances shut-down, along with online censorship, on November 17 Kuznetsov's music-video 'Judas' being permanently banned from Russian YouTube, while later on December 12 three more music-videos [Poem of the Motherland, Bullet-Dura, and Pyromaniac 2017] would be banned by additional court mandates.

On November 21, Kuznetsov's Krasnodar Krai concert would face several iterations of censorship. It was to be held in Arena Hall, but prior to the concert a warning was sent to Kuznetsov's then tour-manager Andrey Orekhov to suspend the performance due to childhood endangerment and 'extremist activity.' The venue then cancelled their involvement but later, after moving the concert to Bounce club, the club organizer's would again receive a lengthy warning against holding the concert. However, once officials found out, they issued the club a warning and then shut off the lights and sound to the club, while also blocking further public participation. In protest, Kuznetsov proceeded to continue his rapping outside the club, climbing on top of a parked car to perform for the crowd a cappella. He was then quickly dragged off the car by police officials and arrested for minor hooliganism and "Intentional destruction or damage to someone else's property, resulting in significant damage" but it was theorized that the police had coaxed the owner of the vehicle into pressing charges on the rapper.

On November 22, Kuznetsov was formally charged with three counts of 'minor hooliganism' and given 12 days + 3 days in a Krasnodar detention facility, along with a fine of 500 rubles. Then-lawyer Alexey Avanesyan argued that the sentence was being unjustly used by the Krasnodar court to punish the crowd for attending instead of penalizing the rapper for wrongdoing. What Kuznetsov was being overly punished for, according to Avanesyan, was the lyrical content of his music, rather than his hooliganism. On November 26, after having served only four days in detention, public backlash to Kuznetsov's jailing forced a quick reappraisal of his case, taking the form of a highly publicized benefit concert organized by rapper Oxxxymiron and others called "I Will Sing My Music" the exact statement Kuznetsov was reported to have said as he was being arrested.

Another reason for Kuznetsov's expedited release was said to be because of immediate, Kremlin intervention by political officials who began to support the rapper once they learned of his case, as reported by Chief Editor for Russian Television Margarita Simonyan. This was later confirmed by an official with the Russian TV channel Dozhd. Further reporting done by Rbc.ru explained that Avanesyan was unaware of any political interventionism during the court proceedings but explained that this was another example of the compromised state of judicial law in Russia. Kuznetsov would be quietly released in the evening from an Ust-Labinsk detention facility, answering no press questions. He later stated, through Avanesyan, that he would remain in Krasnodar to "resolve the situation."

On December 2, Kuznetsov would face his last censored concert as part of the final month of his Leprosy Tour. A concert planned in Vologoda was cancelled prior to the rapper's arrival by Party Club XO art director Daniil Plotnikov due to intervention by the Ministry of Internal Affairs. They issued a warning against the club which foretold future intervention if the concert was not cancelled. According to reporting done by MediaZona, the final cancellation was predicated on bureaucratic intervention by Vologda Oblast Ombudsman Olga Smirnova who urged an assessment of the lyrics due to voiced complaints and concern for child-safety and wellbeing by angered parents. In retrospect, the entire episode was dubbed by journalists as, "Huskygate."

== Discography ==
=== Studio albums ===
- 2013 - "Dog's Life / сбчь жзнь"
- 2017 - "Favorite Songs of (Imaginary) People / Любимые песни (воображаемых) людей"
- 2020 - "Xoshkhonog / Хошхоног"
- 2025 - "Partisan / Партизан"

=== Remix albums ===
- 2018 - "Distortion / Искажение"
- 2020 - "It's all hu / это все ху"

=== Remix singles ===
- 2021- Хаски and Meroshi - Никогда-нибудь (Summer mix)

=== Mini-albums ===
- 2015 - "Self-Portraits / Автопортреты "
- 2018 - "Triptych on Human Flesh / Триптих о Человечине"
- 2019 - "U / У"
- 2024 - "Русский Альбом" (Russian Album)

=== Singles ===
- 2011 - "Return of the Legend / Возвращение Легенды"
- 2011 - "On the Streets of the Future / На Улицах Будущего"
- 2011 - "Natural Accidents / Закономерные Случайности"
- 2017 - "The Sky Hates Us / Небо ненавидит наc"
- 2017 - "Mole 17 / Крот 17"
- 2017 - "Watcher / Смотрящий"
- 2018 - " Poem about the Homeland / Поэма о Родине"
- 2019 - "Seventh of October / Седьмое октября"
- 2021 - "NPC"
- 2022: Эскимо / Eskimo
- 2022: Горячая Линия / Hotline
- 2022: Ноктюрн / Nocturne
- 2023: О Любви / About Love
- 2024: Сказки / Fairy Tales
- 2024: Громко / Loud
- 2024: Шансон 2 / Chanson 2

=== Collaborations ===
- 2014 - РИЧ - "Ten / Десятка" ( 'It's time to throw down / Пора валить' ft. Zakhar Prilepin)
- 2015 - РИЧ - "Methane / Метан" ( 'In the Room / В Комнате')
- 2015 - РИЧ - "In the Ocean / На океан" ('Capital / Столица' ft. Zakhar Prilepin and Alexander F. Sklyar)
- 2015 - Zakhar Prilepin and Elefank - "Hunter / Охотник" ( 'Revenge' ft. РИЧ)
- 2016 - РИЧ - "By the House / У Дома" ( 'By the House / У Дома ')
- 2017 - Озёра - "Ferrari / Феррари" ( 'Moon / Луна')
- 2017 - 25/17 - "Eve goes to Babylon / Ева едет в Вавилон" (' Beat Shakes the Head / Бит шатает голову (Remix)' - 'Our Summer / Наше лето' ft. Саграда)
- 2018 - Бакей - "Nagchampa" ('Bubbles / Пузыри' ft. Kakora)
- 2018 - Типси Тип - "Dating / Датынет" ('In you / В тебе')
- 2018 - Big Baby Tape - "Dragonborn" ('98 flow')
- 2018 - КАЗУСКОМА - "Corral / Загон" (' There are so many things around / Вокруг так много всего')
- 2019 - Jeembo - "Swamp / Топь" ('Single / сингл')
- 2019 - Pixelord - "Cyber Uncle / Cyberдядя" (' Blah Blah / Блабла')
- 2019 - White Punk - "Spider / ПАУК" ('Spider Milk Паучъе молоко')
- 2020 - OFFMi - "TO U" ('Crew / Экипаж' ft. bollywood.fm)
- 2020 - zavet - "Veins / жилы" (' Needles and Lights / Иглы и Огни,' ' Monument / Монумент')
- 2020 - IC3PEAK - "Goodbye / До Свидания" ('Funny and Sad / Весело и грустно')
- 2020 - Everthe8 - "Not by Recipe" ('Oasis / Оазис')
- 2020 - 25/17 - "Tales from the Crypt / Байки из склепа" ('Generations / Поколения' ft. HASH TAG)
- 2021 - РИЧ - " Dream of the Socialist Revolutionary / Сон эсера» ('Ruthenium / Рутений')
- 2023 - Little Buddhist - "Мамбо" (Mambo ft. METAGHETTO)

== Videography ==
=== Music videos ===
- 2011 - "Seventh of October / Седьмое октября"
- 2013 - "Spaceship / Космолет"
- 2014 - "It's time to throw down / Пора валить" (ft. РИЧ and Zakhar Prilepin)
- 2015 - "Black and White Boogie / Чёрно-белый буги" (ft. РИЧ, Zakhar Prilepin and Elefank)
- 2015 - "In the room / В комнате" (ft. РИЧ)
- 2016 - "Blackest Black / Черным-черно"
- 2017 - "Heaven Hates Us / Небо ненавидит нас" (ft. РИЧ)
- 2017 - "Bullet-Fool / Пуля-дура"
- 2017 - "Large panel system-building / Панелька"
- 2017 - "Ay / Ай"
- 2017 - "Pyromaniac 17 / Пироман 17"
- 2017 - "Mole 17 / Крот 17"
- 2018 - "Judas / Иуда"
- 2018 - "Poem about the Homeland / Поэма о Родине"
- 2019 - "Baby Hollywood / Детка-Голливуд"
- 2019 - "Seventh of October / Седьмое Октября" (2019 version)
- 2019 - "Anew / Заново"
- 2019 - "Kill me / Убей меня" ('Jointly with the rapper White Snake Oil / совместно с рэпером масло чёрного тмина")
- 2019 - "Spider Milk / Паучъе молоко" ('Jointly with White Punk / совместно с White Punk")
- 2020 - "Nothing-Nothing / Никогда-нибудь"
- 2020 - "Bottomless Magazine / Бесконечный магазин"
- 2021 - "Revenge / Реванш"
- 2022 - "Invisible man / Невидимка"
- 2022 - "Ode to Nothing"
- 2022 - "A Song for K / Песня для К"
- 2022 - "Necro / Некро"
- 2023 - "About Love"
- 2024: "Fairy Tales"
- 2024: "Chanson 2"

=== Short films ===
- 2017 - "Psychotronics / Психотроника" ('Short film / короткометражный фильм')
- 2019 - "Lucifer / Люцифер" ('Short Film / короткометражный фильм')
- 2022 - "ЧВК Филармония / Philharmonic PMC" (Documentary short film)

=== Participation ===
- 2017 - Каста - "Braces / Скрепы"
- 2017 - Пасош - "January / Январь"
- 2018 - ПОЕХАЛИ - "Strong Style / Сильный стиль"
- 2019 - Boulevard Depo - "No Flag"

== See also ==
- Russian hip hop
- Hookah rap
- Oxxxymiron
- Timati
- Music of Russia
- Hip Hop
