= Smoky Mo =

Russian rapper and producer (born 1982)

Smoky Mo Смоки Мо
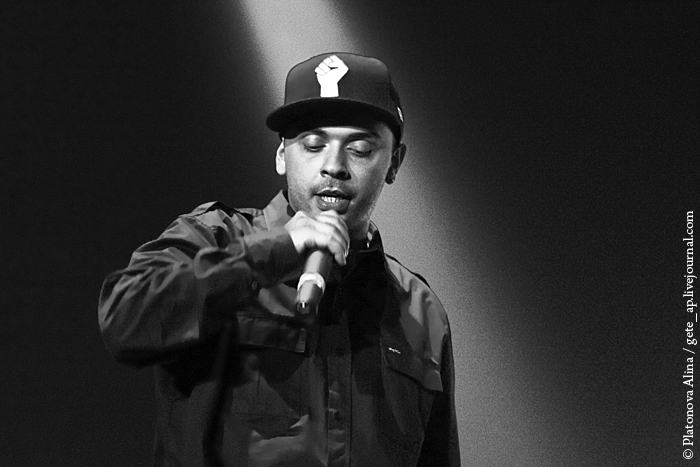

Background information
- Also known as: Смок, Смоки Мо, Smoky Mo, SmokyMo46, smokymolla46, Некий Мо, Дымный Мо, Молла, Омикомс, Смоки Морфин, King Mozi, SUPER MARIO.
- Born: Aleksandr Aleksandrovich Tsykhov; September 10, 1982 (age 44); Leningrad, USSR
- Genres: Russian hip hop; Hardcore hip hop; Trap; Gangsta rap; Trip hop
- Years active: 1996-present

Aleksandr Aleksandrovich Tsykhov (Russian: Алекса́ндр Алекса́ндрович Ци́хов; born 10 September 1982 in Leningrad), better known under the pseudonym Smoky Mo (Russian: Смо́ки Мо) is a Russian rapper, beatmaker & record producer.

== Biography ==
=== Years of 1999—2002 ===
In 2001, he won the Rap Music festival as part of the team "Династия Ди".

In 2004, Smoky Mo signed with the label Respect Production, who produced such rap teams like Kasta & "Ю.Г.", and they agreed to release an album. A record called "Кара-Тэ" was released in the spring the same year and received positive feedback.

=== Since 2009 ===
The album "Время Тигра", which was the fourth consecutive, was published through the label MadStyleMusic supported by Soyuz Music at the start of May 2011.

On 11 June 2013, Smoky Mo released his fifth album "Младший" featuring artists Glukoza, Basta & Тати.

In 2016, with Zloi Negr, Smoky Mo released the mixtape "Доспехи бога" featuring Пика, Яникса, D.masta, Slava KPSS & Loc-Dog, in which he served mainly as a beatmaker.

In 2018, he participated as a mentor on the Versus Battle "Fresh Blood 4: Война стилей".
