= Moscow Palace of Youth =

- Московский дворец молодёжи
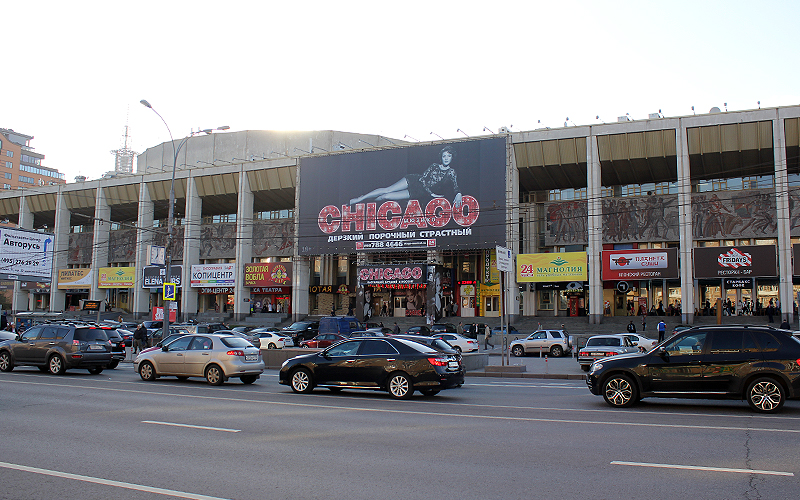
- The building of the Moscow Youth Palace from Komsomolsky Prospekt, 2014
- Interactive map of the Moscow Palace of Youth area

General information
- Architectural style: Modernist architecture
- Location: 28 Komsomolsky Prospekt, Khamovniki District, Central Administrative Okrug, Moscow, Russia
- Coordinates: 55°43′36″N 37°34′47″E
- Construction started: 1982
- Completed: 1988

Technical details
- Floor count: 4

Design and construction
- Architects: Yakov Belopolsky; M. E. Belenya; Mikhail Posokhin; Vladimir Khavin

The Moscow Palace of Youth (Russian: Московский дворец молодёжи, romanized: Moskovsky dvorets molodyozhi), also called the Moscow Youth Palace or the MDM, is an entertainment complex in Moscow, located in the Khamovniki District above the Frunzenskaya metro station. The building was constructed in 1982–1988 according to the designs of architects Yakov Belopolsky, M. E. Belenya, Mikhail Posokhin and Vladimir Khavin.

== History ==
=== Construction ===
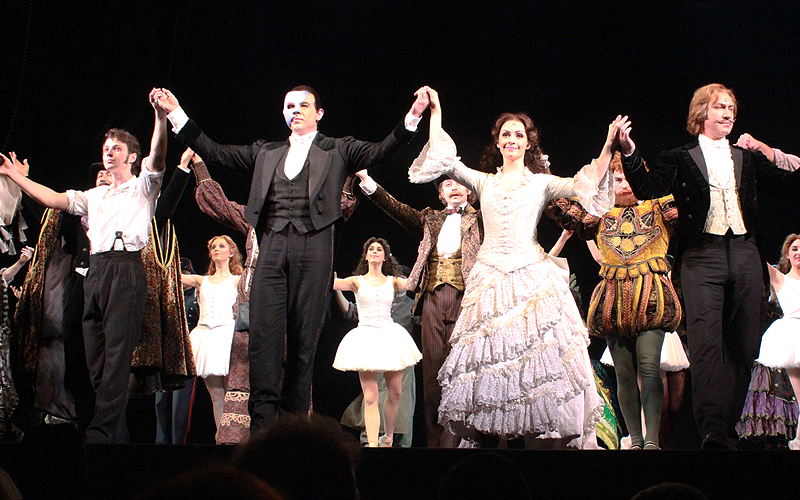
Artists of the musical "The Phantom of the Opera", 2015

In 1972, architect Yakov Belopolsky, together with his colleagues F. M. Gazhievsky, Yuri Abramovich Dykhovichny and Roman Grigorievich Kananin, submitted a project for the Youth Palace in Moscow to a competition. However, the original appearance of the building was changed during the approval process: instead of a triangular building topped with a flying statue, a trapezoidal one surrounded by stairs appeared. Construction began in 1982 under the supervision of architects Belopolsky, Belen, Posokhin and Khavin, and was completed in 1988.

=== 21st century ===
Until 2002, the Large Hall of the palace hosted the KVN Major League games, then it began to be used as a venue for musicals.

In the 2003-2004 season, the production company "Russian musical" organized performances of the musical 12 Chairs, which is based on the novel The Twelve Chairs by Ilf and Petrov.

From 2005 to 2018, the main stage of the building featured many musicals by Stage Entertainment: Cats (2005-2006), Mamma Mia! (2006-2008, 2012-2013), Beauty and the Beast (2008-2010), Zorro (2010-2011), The Sound of Music (2011-2012), Chicago (2013-2014), The Phantom of the Opera (2014-2016), Dance of the Vampires (2016-2017), and Ghost (2017-2018).

In 2014, for the premiere of The Phantom of the Opera, the palace's Large Hall was refurbished: its capacity was increased to 1,800 people, the acoustics were improved, the stages were deepened, new lighting and sound equipment was installed, and the fly bars were replaced. The marble portal of the central entrance to the auditorium, which had been located behind the small stage for 20 years, was reopened to visitors. A central chandelier and new bar areas were installed in the foyer. The reconstruction was carried out by Stage Entertainment.

In 2017, the Moscow Urban Development and Land Commission approved the reconstruction of the palace, during which it is planned to glaze the facade to increase the area of the building from 46 to 52.2 thousand m².

Since 2018, the Large Hall and foyer of the MDM have hosted musicals and performances created by the Broadway Moscow theater company and the Fancy Show production company: A Very Funny Comedy About How a SHOW WENT WRONG (2018-2019), A Comedy About How a Bank Was Robbed (2019-2020), First Date (2019-2020), Chess (2020-2021), Valentine's Day (2020-2021), Don't Be Afraid, I'm With You (since 2022).

In February 2020, the Moscow Committee for Architecture approved the reconstruction project of the Moscow Youth Palace. The work was planned to be completed by the end of 2022. As of August 2023, the reconstruction has not begun.

== Architecture ==
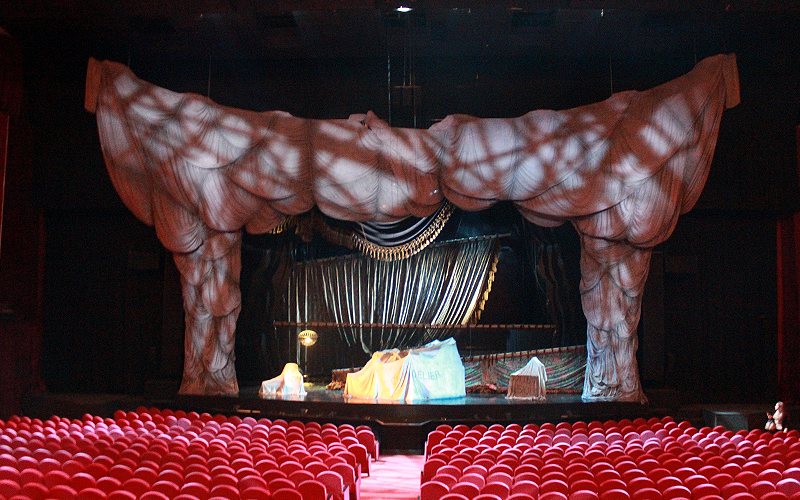
The Large Hall stage: set design for the musical The Phantom of the Opera, 2015

The Youth Palace is designed in the style of monumental modernism. The trapezoid-shaped building is set on a hill and faced with white stone. According to the architects' idea, the building does not have a main entrance; instead, visitors are greeted by a colonnade supporting the roof. The upper part of the façade is decorated with a decorative frieze. In the northern part of the building is the entrance to the vestibule of the Frunzenskaya metro station, built long before the palace appeared on this site. In 1984, during the construction of MDM, one part of the vestibule was built into the palace building, and the other was dismantled. The entrance to the metro was decorated with a strict portico with square columns.

The interiors of the palace are designed with open staircases and balconies. The Large Hall (also called the MDM Theater) seats 1,800 people. It hosts musicals, conferences, concerts and performances. The Parquet Hall, with an area of 1,200 m², can accommodate up to two thousand people. It is rented out for corporate events, exhibitions and banquets. The MDM also houses the Small Hall, billiards, bowling, restaurants and shops. The third floor is occupied by the "Kronverk Cinema. MDM" cinema with four halls, one of which is designed as an amphitheater.
