= Krovostok =

Russian rap group

Krovostok Кровосток
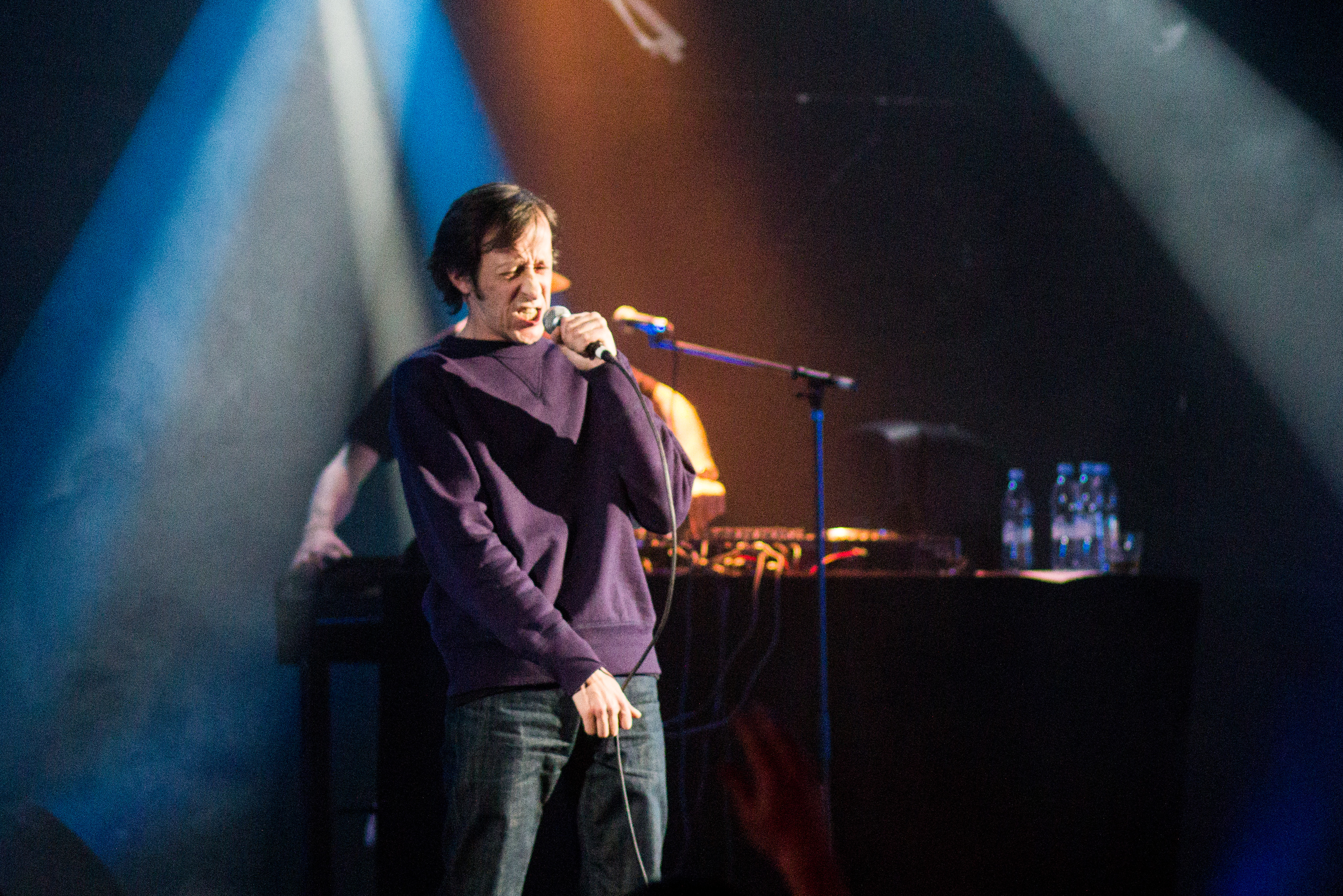

Background information
- Origin: Moscow, Russia.
- Genres: Abstract hip-hop; gangsta rap; hardcore hip-hop; underground hip-hop; comedy hip-hop
- Years active: 2003–present
- Labels: Zda-Rec; Feelee Records; Mystery of sound
- Members: Shilo/Anton Obval'shchik; Dr. Feldman; Phantomas 2000
- Past members: DJ Polutrup; KotZilla/Kot
- Website: http://www.krovostok.ru/

Krovostok (Russian: Кровосто́к) is a Russian abstract hip-hop group formed in Moscow in 2003.

At first, Krovostok was perceived as a joke (even by the members themselves), but that did not prevent the group from becoming one of the most successful and original rap collectives in Russia. A characteristic feature of Krovostok's music is the use of profanity in their idiosyncratic monotonous flow. The group's members can be considered representatives of the creative intelligentsia: Shilo is an artist and poet, Feldman is a writer and installation artist, and both are former members of the art collective FenSo (ru:ФенСо).

== History ==
Anton Chernyak (Shilo) and Dmitry Fain (Feldman) studied together at Moscow Academic Art Сollege. They later became members of the FenSo (Russian: ФенСо) artist collective. After this, Shilo took part in the art collective PG (Russian: «ПГ»). They met the third member of Krovostok, Sergey Krylov (DJ Polutrup), when he was working as a bartender at the PushkinG (Russian: «ПушкинГ») art club founded by the PG group.

On 24 March 2012, the new album Studen' (Russian: «Студень») was posted as a free download on the group's website.

On 6 March 2015, Krovostok released their fifth album, Lombard (Russian: «Ломбард», lit. 'Pawnshop').

On 26 March 2016, the single "Nayok yok" (Russian: «Наёк ёк») was released. On 9 August 2016, Krovostok released the single "Dush" (Russian: «Душ», lit. 'Shower'). On 1 March 2017, they released the single "Golova" (Russian: «Голова», lit. 'Head').

On 23 March 2018, Krovostok released the concert album Krovostok Live (Russian: «Кровосток Лайв»), and on 30 March 2018. they released the studio album ChB (Russian: «ЧБ»), containing 11 tracks, including the previously released singles "Nayok yok", "Dush", and "Golova".

=== Concert and court case in Yaroslavl ===
In 2015, the Federal Drug Control Service office in Yaroslavl filed a complaint to the regional prosecutor, requesting that the prosecutor's office investigate Krovostok's lyrics for compliance with the requirements of Russian legislation. According to the leadership of the Federal Drug Control Service, Krovostok's music contains "a large amount of foul language and slang terms for drugs," and "popularizes non-medical psychoactive narcotic use, random sexual relations, illegal actions, and violence.” In July 2015, the Kirovsky district court in Yaroslavl ruled that Krovostok's lyrics were illegal in Russia and ordered federal censors to block the group's website.

Dmitry Fain, the main author of the lyrics, called the ban on his work unconstitutional and stated that the court's decision would not change the group's concert plans. On 13 October 2015, the Yaroslavl Regional Court held a hearing on the appeal from Krovostok. However, no decision was made on this day, as not all parties were acquainted with the additional materials in the case. The trial was rescheduled for 27 October 2015.

On 12 November, the Yaroslavl regional court overturned the Kirovsky district court's decision on banning the band's songs and blocking the official site. The Prosecutor's office's claims were rejected in full.

== Members ==
=== Current members ===
- Anton Chernyak (Russian: Антон Черняк) aka Shilo (Russian: Шило) aka Anton Obval'shchik (Russian: Антон Обвальщик) - vocal, rapping, lyrics
- Dmitry Fain (Russian: Дмитрий Файн) aka Feldman (Russian: Фельдман) aka Dr. Feldman (Russian: Dr. Фельдман) - lyrics, producer
- Konstantin Rudchik (Russian: Константин Рудчик) aka Phantomas 2000 (Russian: Фантомас 2000) - beatmaker, back-vocals, lyrics

=== Past members ===
- Sergey Krylov aka DJ Polutrup (Russian: DJ Полутруп) - beatmaker
- Konstantin Arshba aka KotZilla - back vocalist, now is actor of musical Cops on fire

== Discography ==
=== Studio albums ===
- 2004 — Blood River («Река крови»)
- 2006 — Exit Wound («Сквозное»)
- 2008 — Dumbbell («Гантеля»)
- 2012 — Aspic («Студень»)
- 2015 — Pawnshop («Ломбард»)
- 2018 — B&W («ЧБ»)
- 2021 — Science («Наука»)
- 2025 — Feasts and Wounds («Пиры и раны»)

=== Concert albums ===
- 2017 — Krovostok Live

=== Singles ===
- 2004
  - «Biography» («Биография»)
  - «White jaguar» («Белый ягуар»)
  - «Cormorants»(«Бакланы»)
  - «Talks about blunts»(«Разговоры о Напасах») (feat. Cat(Кот) («43 Grаdusa»))
- 2005
  - «Want some?»(«Хочешь?»)
  - «HydroHigh»(«ГидроГаш») (feat. Krasnoe Derevo)
- 2007
  - «Dumbbell»(«Гантеля»)
  - «H.P.P»(«ГЭС»)
  - «Riots»(«Беспорядки»)
- 2011
  - «Imagine»(«Представьте»)
  - «Time to go home»(«Пора домой»)
  - «Stuffy»(«Душно»)
- 2014
  - «Nails»(«Ногти»)
  - «Cherepovets»(«Череповец»)
  - «Sex is»(«Секс Это»)
- 2015
  - «Pawnshop»(«Ломбард»)
- 2016
  - «Nayok yok»(«Наёк ёк»)
  - «Shower»(«ДУШ»)
- 2017
  - «Head»(«Голова»)
- 2020
  - «Children»(«Дети»)

=== Videos ===
The band doesn't have any official music videos, all the videos are made by enthusiasts.

- «Lose your head»(Теряю голову») Live (2006)
- «Cormorants»(«Бакланы») Live (2008)
- «Dumbbell»(«Гантеля») karaoke (2009)
- «Riots»(«Беспорядки») karaoke (2009)
- «Villagers»(Колхозники») (2010)
- «H.P.P»(«Г.Э.С») (2010)
- «Jacket»(«Куртец») (2012) (it is a cutting of fragments from the movie «Alien»).
- «Nails»(«Ногти») (ft K.Sobchack) (2015) — clipping of interview of Shilo on TV Rain.
- «Cherepovets»(«Череповец») - clip-demonstration of landscapes of the city of Cherepovets by Rina Dragunova
- “Stuffy” («Душно») (2026) - on YouTube by Sima_Lacrum
