= Ligalize =

Russian musician (born 1977)

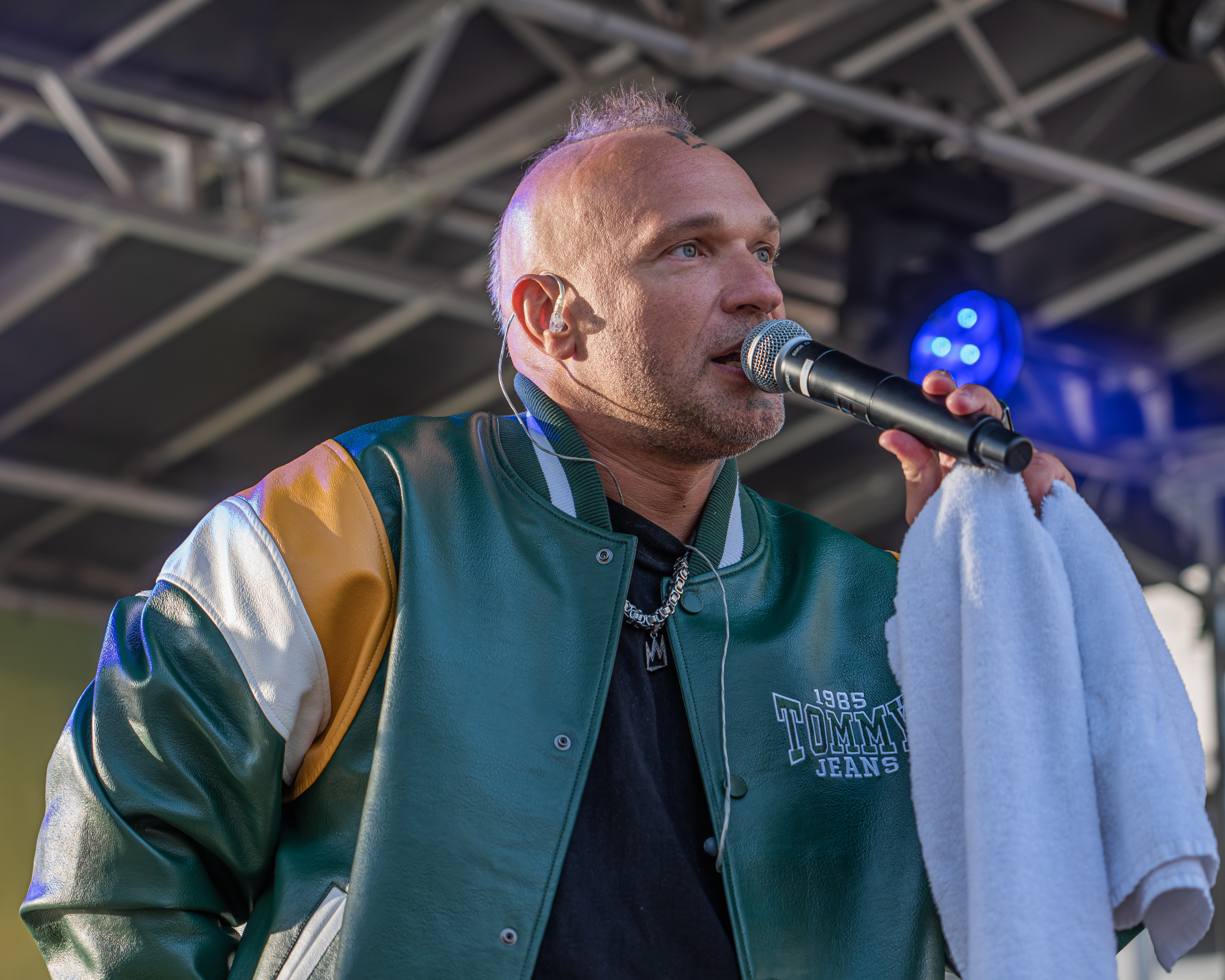
- Ligalize in 2024

Background information
- Also known as: Liga
- Born: Andrey Vladimirovich Menshikov; June 30, 1977 (age 48); Moscow, Soviet Union
- Genres: R&B, Hip hop
- Years active: 1993–present
- Labels: Intelligentny khuligan Productions

Andrey Vladimirovich Menshikov (Russian: Андрей Владимирович Меньшиков; born 30 June 1977), mostly known under his stage name Ligalize (Лигалайз), is a Russian hip-hop artist and a former leader of the Legal Busine$$ band. Ligalize was also a member of D.O.B. Community and Bad Balance.

== Early life ==
Menshikov was born July 30, 1977, in Moscow. Hip-hop came in 1993: Ligalize and Ladjack organized the project "Slingshot". He called himself "Ligalize" because that was the name of his first group. Slingshot was a more serious project. They began by rapping in English, as the Russian language did not seem appropriate for rap, and recorded their first underground album.

== D.O.B. ==
Slingshot was the main part of the "Department Of Bastards" (D.O.B.). The founder of this group is Sir-J, whose background included the experience of living in neighborhoods of the Bronx. Ligalize participated in D.O.B.'s recording Rushun Roolet, an English-language rap with a hard underground sound.

In Moscow Ligalize completed work on the album Masters of Words (Мастера Слова). For this album, Ligalize rapped in Russian.

== Legal Busine$$ ==
Project "Legal Busine$$" (Легальный Бизне$$) with N'Pans seemed more attractive than just a solo MC Legalize. In general terms, the project looked like this: a talented Russian MC (Ligalize), colorful black MC (N'Pans) and capable DJ (DJ Ton1k). In 2000 was released album of Legal Busine$$ - "Rifmomafiya".

== P-13 ==
In 2001 Ligalize left Moscow and in Prague he crossed with a young rappers from the command P-13 (П-13). They record an album "Провокация" ("Provocation"), considered as one of the first albums of battle rap in Russia. Prague period lasted just over a year, and yet the Ligalize is back.

== Dissin' SheFF ==
In autumn 2002 Ligalize returned to Moscow and took over the leadership of hip-hop project label D & D Music, a new company of Tolmatskogy.

== XL ==
Despite the fact that the Liga of hip-hop for over ten years, he still had in an asset or as a solo album. In 2006, the solo album finally saw the light. The album is called "XL".

== Discography ==
Slingshot

- Salut Frum Rusha (Unreleased) (1994)

D.O.B.

- Rushun Roolet (1997)
- Мастера Слова (Masters Of Words) (2000)
- Короли Андеграунда (Kings Of Underground) (2004)

Legal Busine$$

- Рифмомафия (Rifmomafia) (2000)

Bad B.

- Каменный Лес (Stone Forest) (2000)
- Новый Мир (The New World) (2001)

Ligalize & P-13

- Провокация (Provocation) (2003)

Solo

- XL (2006)
- Живой (Alive) (2016)
- Молодой Король (Young King) (2018)
- ALI (2020)

Mixtapes

- Liga'MIX (2009)
- Провокация Mixtape (Памяти МС Молодого) (Provocation Mixtape - R.I.P. MC Molodoy)' (2009)
