= Bad Balance =

Russian hip hop group

Bad Balance Плохой баланс
- Also known as: Bad B.
- Origin: Saint Petersburg, Russia
- Genres: Hip hop Funk; Jazz-rap; Old school hip hop Underground rap Mafioso rap
- Years active: 1989–present
- Labels: Gala Records, Mixmedia, 100PRO
- Spinoffs: Bad B. Alliance
- Members: SHEFF; Al Solo; DJ Topor
- Past members: DJ LA; Mikhey; Mr. Bruce; Ligalize; Kuper
- Website: www.badb.ru

Bad Balance is a Russian rap group considered to be one of the first rap acts in USSR. The group maintained a devoted underground following during the 1990s. The group made huge contribution to the hip-hop culture in Russia and ex-USSR countries. SHEFF (founder and main member of Bad Balance) is often considered as original creator of hip-hop culture in Russia, and for years the leader of Russian old school hip hop.

== History ==
=== Formation ===
Bad Balance was formed as a breakdance crew in the 1980s in Saint-Petersburg by students from Donetsk named Vlad Valov (SHEFF) and Sergey Krutikov (Mikhey). Group switched to rapping and recorded the debut album "Vishe Zakona" (Above the Law) in 1989 for Gala Records.

=== Classic era ===
The band toured Russia, Europe and the USA, playing more than 500 shows worldwide during the 90s. Classic Bad Balance albums include: "Naletchiki Bad B." (Raiders Bad B.) (1994), "Chisto PRO ..." (Clearly PRO) (1996) and "Gorod Jungley" (City Of Jungles) (1998), all of which were released under the Gala Records label during this period. These Bad Balance albums represent the most popular Russian rap albums of the 1990s. No other Russian rap group has since been able to rise to the level of popularity achieved by Bad Balance.

=== Bad B. Alliance era ===
Mikhey left the band to push solo career as a reggae/soul singer, while SHEFF formed "Bad B. Alliance". Both gained huge mainstream popularity Bad Balance itself has never seen. Ligalize joins Bad Balance. Long-awaited album "Kamenniy les" (Stone Wood) released by Mixmedia in 2001. The album was fully recorded at "East-West Records" studio (New York, USA) with American artists Rad Roc, B. Ricks, Rocsigar, T.R. Love, Carla W, Trenger, Jimmy, DJ Charm and others. The creation of album was also helped by Ice-T and Natalia Nastaskin. During recording of album in New York City, band repeatedly gave performances and also participated in various programs on national radio stations. "Kamenniy les" (Stone Wood) marked beginning of promotion Russian hip-hop in the world music industry. Many listeners and critics still call album "Kamenniy les" (Stone Wood) the best Russian-language hip-hop album of all time.

=== Later period ===
Bad B. Alliance disbanded following Ligalize's departure and conflicts with investors (Tolmatskiy). Mikhey dies of heart failure. Kuper (DA-108) and Al Solo (Beliye Bratya) join Bad Balance. Popularity declines. "Malo-po-malu" (Gradually) (2003) and "Legendi gangsterov" (Legends of Gangsters) (2008) released by Valov's own record label "100PRO". Album "Legendi gangsterov" (Legends of Gangsters) began series of conceptual albums, where all the songs are united by one common theme. In 2009 Bad Balance released album "Semero Odnogo Ne Jhdut" (Seven Dont Wait For One), it talks about the birth of hip-hop culture in Russia. Album made in original old-school style. In 2012 Vlad Valov released new Bad Balance album "World Wide". In this album group talks about changes in Russian hip-hop culture, as well as the fact that show business and money kill the real spirit of rap music, several foreign artists took part in this album. Group member MC Kuper takes creative pause. Next conceptual album "Kriminal 90" (Crime 90's) released in 2013. On this album SHEFF and Al-Solo tell stories from criminal life of Russia in 1990s. After break Kuper returns to active work. In 2014 experimental album "Severnaya Mistika" (North Mystic) comes out, it is released under the "Bad B. Pro" brand. The main MCs on the album are SHEFF and Kuper. The music on the album includes a lot of ethnic motifs, and all the songs are dedicated to the ancient history of Russia. DJ Topor (Da Boogie Crew DJ`s) becomes concert DJ.

=== Today ===
September 16, 2016 Bad Balance released their new 12th studio album. The album is conceptual. It is called "Politics" and appeals to all politicians of the world on behalf of the streets. SHEFF and Al-Solo talking about officials things that people say in bars for a beer mug. This album will tell about many pitfalls, because of which flare up: coups, strikes, riots, revolutions, wars. By this album Bad Balance returns the spirit of hip-hop culture. The album reflects the reality of today's days. Bad Balance becomes the only voice in the entire Russian musical culture, who is not afraid to talk openly about politics.

== Style and reception ==
The group was viewed as Russia’s hip-hop pioneers (Cocks, 2002) and their popularity exploded after the fall of the USSR. They are now seen as mimicking American hip-hop and their music does sound much like typical American hip-hop from the 1990s, but with added influences from jazz and rock. While the group is now considered antiquated, at the time the government believed Bad Balance was politically subversive and accused them of spreading dangerous ideas and messages. This is because the group was not afraid to discuss political and social issues, like the increase in street violence, issues they felt were important in their lives and in the lives of their listeners. The discussion of these issues presented negative images of the USSR to the Russian people and the world in general and thereby set the government further against hip-hop. Despite this, the group survived the fall of the communist government and began releasing albums and videos soon after.

== Members ==
The members of Bad Balance in our days:

- Master SHEFF (Vlad Valov) - founder and leader (1989 -.).
- Al Solo (Albert Krasnov) - acting MC, beatmaker (2002 -.).
- DJ Topor (Da Boogie Crew DJ`s) - concert DJ (2014 -.).

Former members:

- DJ Wolf (Vladislav Vaytekhovich) - DJ (1990-1991)
- Barmaley (Alexei Bogdanov) - artist, breaker (1989-1992)
- Laga (Alexei Lagoysky) - breaker (1989-1994)
- Swan (Dmitry Swan) - breaker (1989-1994)
- Scalia (Alexey Skalinov) - MC, breaker (1989-1995)
- Basket (Oleg Baskov) - graffiti artist, album designer (1994-1999)
- Mikhey (Sergey Krutikov) - co-founder of the band, MC and vocalist (1989-1999, 2002) †
- DJ LA (Gleb Matveev) - co-founder of the group, DJ, beat-maker (1989-2002)
- Ligalize (Andrey Menshikov) - MC (2000-2001)
- Mr. Bruce - bass guitar
- Kuper (Roman Alekseev) - acting MC (2001 - 2020) †

== Discography ==
- Выше Закона (Higher Than Law) (1990)
- Налётчики Bad B. (Raders Bad B) (1994)
- Чисто PRO... (Clearly PRO) (1996) (under group name "Bad B. Pro")
- Город Джунглей (City Of Jungles) (1998)
- Каменный Лес (Stone Wood) (2001)
- Мало-По-Малу (Little by little) (2003)
- Легенды Гангстеров (Gangster legends) (2007)
- Семеро одного не ждут (Seven Don't Wait For One) (2009)
- World Wide (2012)
- Криминал 90-х (90's Crime) (2013)
- Северная Мистика (Northern Mysticism) (2014) (under group name "Bad B. Pro")
- Политика (Politics) (2016)
