= Peekaboo (Aarne album) =

Studio album by Aarne, Big Baby Tape
- Released: June 28, 2024
- Genre: Trap
- Length: 37:06
- Language: Russian
- Label: Benzo Records

Peekaboo is a joint studio album by Russian singers Big Baby Tape and Aarne, released on 28 June 2024.

In total, the album includes 15 compositions, featuring Icegergert, Toxi$, Платина, Voskresenskii and Feduk.

== Track listing ==
No.	Title	Length
1.	"Training Day"	2:14
2.	"Coldest Man"	2:19
3.	"MJ Flow"	2:38
4.	"Not Obama"	2:24
5.	"Da Law" (featuring Icegergert)	2:32
6.	"BFF Interlude"	1:09
7.	"Supersonic"	2:44
8.	"Ameli" (featuring Toxi$)	2:59
9.	"EDM" (featuring Платина)	2:43
10.	"Closer"	2:02
11.	"Taz Muzik" (featuring Voskresenskii)	2:43
12.	"FREESOSA" (featuring Feduk)	2:46
13.	"Krug" (featuring Платина)	3:39
14.	"Four Seasons"	2:23
15.	"AAutro"	1:47
Total length:		37:06

== Reactions ==
- Hip-hop portal The Flow placed the album at number 13 on the list of the 50 best domestic albums of 2024.
