= Gimme The Loot (Big Baby Tape song) =

"Gimme the Loot"

Single by Big Baby Tape

from the album Dragonborn
- Language: Russian
- Genre: Trap
- Length: 2:15
- Label: Warner Music Russia

"Gimme the Loot" is a single by Russian hip hop-singer Big Baby Tape from his debut album Dragonborn. The song was based on a sample from the song The Notorious B.I.G. "Gimme the Loot."
