= Blago White =

Russian rapper (born 1995)

- Born: Vladislav Vyacheslavovich Pomerantsev (Russian: Владислав Вячеславович Померанцев); 19 November 1995 (age 30); Moscow, Russia
- Genres: Hip hop
- Occupation: Rapper
- Label: Universal Music

Vladislav Vyacheslavovich Pomerantsev (Russian: Владислав Вячеславович Померанцев; born 19 November 1995), better known as Blago White, is a Russian rapper.

== Biography ==
Vladislav was born on 19 November 1995 in Moscow. At age two, he moved with his family to the United States. He returned to Russia when he was seven years old. Due to his poor Russian-speaking skills, he completed his studies in English-speaking schools.

== Discography ==
=== Studio albums ===
List of studio albums with details
Title	Details
Icyhotbox	Release: 9 October 2019; Label: StartUp Music; Format: digital, streaming
Tha Malchik	Release: 29 February 2020; Label: StartUp Music; Format: digital streaming
Myasa	Release: 15 October 2020; Label: Universal Music; Format: digital streaming
Krasavchik	Release: 18 November 2021; Label: Universal Music; Format: digital streaming

=== Singles ===
==== As the lead singer ====
List of singles as lead artist, showing year released & album title
Title	Year	Album
«Lemme Smoke» (with Boost Morale)	2018	Icyhotbox
«Brat» (featuring OG Buda)	2019	Tha Malchik
«Благодарен»	2020	Tha Malchik
«Karantina»	2020	Non-album single
«Perlamutr»	2020	Myasa
«Babki» (with Boost Morale)	2021	Non-album single
«Ты тупая или глупый»	2021	Non-album single
«Благословил»	2021	TBA
«Cristal &amp; Моёт (Remix)» (with Morgenshtern, OG Buda, Soda Luv & Mayot)	2021	Non-album single
«Monte Carlo»	2021	Non-album single
«Only Positive Vibes» (with PINQ)	2021	Non-album single
«Mane»	2021	Non-album single
«Братва на связи» (with Sqwoz Bab & Gone.Fludd)	2021	Non-album single
«Nebaskryobi»	2021	Non-album single
«Веселей» (with Антохой МС)	2021	Non-album single
«Мир»	2022	Non-album single
«Солнце монако (Tha Remix)» (with Lusia Chebotina & Mayot)	2022	Non-album single
«Vnaturi»	2022	Non-album single
«Monster Kill» (with Yanix)	2022	Non-album single
«11»	2022	Non-album single
«I Love My Life» (with Джарахов & Molodoj Platon)	2022	Non-album single

==== With others as featured singer ====
List of singles as featured singer with details of release year
Title	Year	Album
«Pain Vibes» (Bushido Zho featuring Blago White)	2020	Non-album single
«Железно» (VisaGangBeatz featuring Blago White)	2020	Non-album single
«Runner» (No.Vel featuring Blago White)	2020	Non-album single
«КаZантип» (Soda Luv featuring Blago White)	2021	Non-album single
«Yes, Sir» (Marco-9 featuring Blago White)	2021	Con Dios
«Дико» (Aquakilla featuring Blago White)	2021	Non-album single
«Tsarbucks» (SC Simmons featuring Blago White)	2021	Non-album single
«Огонь» (OG Minay featuring Blago White)	2021	Non-album single
«Pain Vibes 2» (Bushido Zho featuring Blago White)	2021	Non-album single
«Культура» (Killjoy featuring Blago White)	2021	Trap Symphony
«Секреты» (Boost Morale featuring Blago White)	2021	Cloud City
«Как надо» (Спэйскид featuring Blago White & Ernst)	2021	Non-album single
«На чиле» (GeeGun featuring Egor Kreed, The Limba, Blago White, OG Buda, Timati, Soda Luv & Guf)	2021	Non-album single
«Talk to Me Nicely (Remix)» (C4 featuring Blago White)	2021	Non-album single
«Фэм» (OG Buda featuring Blago White)	2021	Non-album single
«Чокопай» (Andro featuring Rakhim, blago white)	2021	Jani Gipsy
«В такт» (Danchainz featuring Blago White)	2022	«Пластик»
«Джаред лето» (Danchainz featuring Blago White)	2022	«Пластик»
«Джаред лето» (Boost Morale featuring Blago White)	2022	Non-album single
