= Aarne (producer) =

Moldavian–Romanian music producer

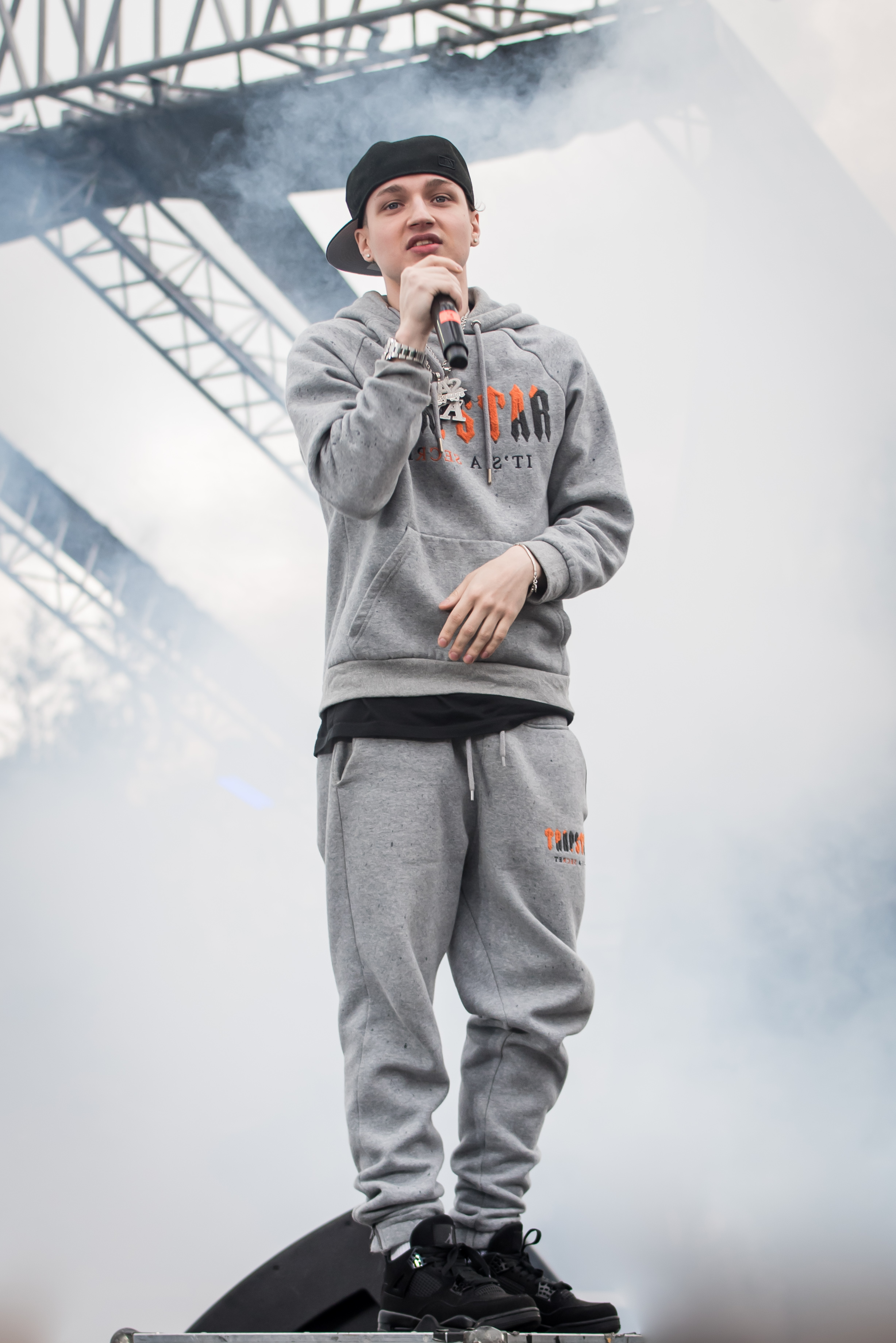

Background information
- Born: March 25, 2001 (age 25); Bucharest, Romania
- Occupation: Music producer
- Years active: 2018-present
- Labels: AA Team, Effective Records

Mircea Păpușoi (born March 25, 2001), known by his stage name Aarne, is a Moldovan - Romanian music producer currently based in London. He lived in Moscow until 2018 when he moved to London for studies. Aarne began producing music in the mid-2010s.

== Career ==
On August 12, 2022, Aarne released his studio album AA Language, featuring collaborations with vocalists such as Feduk, Bushido Zho, Anikv, Morgenshtern, Big Baby Tape, Mayot, Markul, Eldzhey, Lil Krystalll, Lil Keed, Mykko Montana, Yanix, Seemee, Obladaet, Slava Marlow, The Limba, Platina, and Blago White. The album topped the Apple Music charts, with the track Tesno reaching the number one position, while Bolno, Fiesta, Ski Ski, and Diskord also entered the top 10.

== Discography ==
=== Studio albums ===
Title	Details	Highest position on chart	
Title	Details	(Lithuania) Lithuania AGATA	Apple Music
AA Language	Release: 12 August 2022; Label: AA Team; Format: Digital streaming	18	1
AA Language 2	Release: 27 October 2023; Label: Effective Records; Format: Digital streaming	—	—
PEEKABOO	Release: 28 June 2024; Label: BENZO RECORDS; Format: Digital streaming	—	—
WE LIVE ONLY ONCE	Release: 9 August 2024; Label: Effective Records; Format: Digital streaming	—	—
SLAANG	Release: 7 November 2025; Label: SLAANG; Format: Digital streaming	—	—
AA Language 3	Release: TBD; Label: TBD; Format: TBD	—	—

== Discography as producer ==
Year	Title	Высшая позиция в чартах											Album
Year	Title	Apple Music	Spotify	YouTube Music	VK (ВКонтакте)	TikTok	Yandex Music	Shazam	SberZvuk	Russian chart	Top Radio & YouTube Hits	Top YouTube Hits	Album
2018	«Front Row» (Convolk)	—	—	—	—	—	—	—	—	—	—	—	Blue Sky Blue Boy
2019	«Hungry Flow» (Jeembo & Tveth)	—	—	—	—	—	—	—	—	—	—	—	Painkiller III
2019	«Money Long» (Kizaru)	—	—	—	—	—	—	—	—	—	—	—	Karmageddon
2019	«Surname» (Big Baby Tape)	—	—	—	—	—	—	—	—	—	—	—	Arguments &amp; Facts
2019	«Baby Soulja» (Telly Grave)	—	—	—	—	—	—	—	—	—	—	—	Non-album single
2019	«New Tradition» (Nessly)	—	—	—	—	—	—	—	—	—	—	—	Non-album single
2019	«7 дней» (Lil Krystalll & Big Baby Tape)	—	—	—	—	—	—	—	—	—	—	—	No Label
2019	«Message» (Kizaru)	—	—	5	—	—	—	—	—	—	—	—	Say No Mo
2020	«Чёрная молния» (Bobugang & Dope V)	—	—	—	—	—	—	—	—	—	—	—	Non-album single
2020	«Hypnotized» (White Punk & Killy)	—	—	—	—	—	—	—	—	—	—	—	«Мрачные тени»
2020	«Cold World» (Lil Keed)	—	—	—	—	—	—	—	—	—	—	—	Trapped on Cleveland 3
2020	«Purge» (Mykko Montana & Lil Keed)	—	—	—	—	—	—	—	—	—	—	—	AA Language
2020	«Где же душа» (Рыночные отношения & Федук)	—	—	—	—	—	—	—	—	—	—	—	2020
2020	«Balance» (Big Baby Tape)	—	4	—	16	—	—	—	—	—	—	—	Non-album single
2020	«Не в тусе» (Платина)	—	—	—	—	—	—	—	—	—	—	—	AA Language
2020	«Pull Up» (Molodoj Platon)	—	—	—	—	—	—	—	—	—	—	—	In Da Club
2020	«Haribo» (Molodoj Platon)	—	—	—	—	—	—	—	—	—	—	—	In Da Club
2021	«Химия» (Sonicworldwide & Go Glare)	—	—	—	—	—	—	—	—	—	—	—	Non-album single
2021	«Noir» (The Limba & Markul)	—	—	—	—	—	—	—	—	—	—	—	AA Language
2021	«Guala» (Малой Uzi)	—	—	—	—	—	—	—	—	—	—	—	Non-album single
2021	«Project Baby» (Molodoj Platon)	—	—	—	—	—	—	—	—	—	—	—	Son of Trap
2021	«Kebab Boy» (Lil Krystalll)	—	—	—	—	—	—	—	—	—	—	—	AA Language
2021	«Сердце для шалав» (Платина)	—	—	—	—	—	—	—	—	—	—	—	Sosa Muzik
2021	«Бригада» (Платина)	—	—	—	—	—	—	—	—	—	—	—	Sosa Muzik
2021	«В клубе» (Платина)	—	—	—	—	—	—	—	—	—	—	—	Sosa Muzik
2021	«Liga La Sosa» (Платина)	—	—	—	—	—	—	—	—	—	—	—	Sosa Muzik
2021	«Заново» (Федук)	—	—	—	—	—	—	—	—	—	—	—	Non-album single
2021	«Kage» (Daveythegreat)	—	—	—	—	—	—	—	—	—	—	—	Tower of David
2021	«Бизнес вумен» (Slava Marlow)	—	—	—	—	3	—	—	11	8	118	18	AA Language
2021	«Stick Baby» (Lil Gnar)	—	—	—	—	—	—	—	—	—	—	—	Die Bout It (Deluxe)
2021	«Sleepknot» (Obladaet)	—	—	—	—	—	—	—	—	—	—	—	Sleepknot
2021	«Миллион дорог» (Slava Marlow)	—	—	—	—	—	—	—	—	—	—	—	Non-album single
2022	«Джеки Чан» (Gotcha)	—	—	—	—	—	—	—	—	—	—	—	Non-album single
2022	«OG Статус» (OG Minay)	—	—	—	—	—	—	—	—	—	—	—	«Сезон Орла»
2022	«Daleko» (Morgenshtern)	2	—	1	4	—	8	—	—	—	—	—	AA Language
2022	«Тесно» (Bushido Zho & ANIKV)	1	—	—	1	—	3	18	2	—	—	—	AA Language
2022	«Больно» (Mayot & Markul)	5	—	—	—	—	—	—	—	—	—	—	AA Language
2022	«Detka» (Blago White)	95	—	—	—	—	—	—	—	—	—	—	AA Language
2022	«On Air» (Obladaet)	11	—	—	—	—	—	—	—	—	—	—	AA Language
2022	«NBA 300 (Outro)» (Платина)	46	—	—	—	—	—	—	—	—	—	—	AA Language
2022	«Фиеста» (Yanix & Seemee)	6	—	—	5	—	—	—	—	—	—	—	AA Language
2022	«Ski Ski» (Big Baby Tape)	8	—	—	—	—	—	—	—	—	—	—	AA Language
2022	«Перепонки» (Федук)	13	—	—	—	—	—	—	—	—	—	—	AA Language
2022	«Discord» (Eldzhey & Lil Krystalll)	9	—	—	—	—	—	—	—	—	—	—	AA Language
2022	«Дом с приведениями» (Obladaet)	—	—	—	—	—	—	—	—	—	—	—	Non-album single
2022	«Недоступен Леймам» (Nikitsunami)	—	—	—	—	—	—	—	—	—	—	—	Non-album single
2022	«Ты одна» (Guram D)	—	—	—	—	—	—	—	—	—	—	—	Non-album single
2022	«Православный дрилл» (Magic Man)	—	—	—	—	—	—	—	—	—	—	—	Non-album single
2022	«Murder Rate» (Kizaru)	—	—	—	13	—	11	—	5	—	—	—	«Тебя любят там где меня нет»
2022	«From UK to RU» (Soda Luv)	—	—	—	—	—	—	—	—	—	—	—	«Ничего личного 2»
2023	«DYM» (Gotcha)	—	—	—	—	—	—	—	—	—	—	—	Non-album single
2023	«Hoodak MP3» (Big Baby Tape)	2	—	—	1	—	2	20	3	—	—	—	Non-album single
2023	«D3» (Eldzhey)	—	—	—	—	—	—	—	—	—	—	—	«Sayonara bоль»
