= Sqwoz Bab =

Russian comedy rapper (born 1994)

Sqwoz Bab Сквозь Баб

Background information
- Born: Marat Firdusovich Mingazov; November 21, 1994 (age 31); Yoshkar-Ola, Mari El, Russia
- Genres: Comedy hip hop; trap
- Occupation: Rapper

Marat Firdusovich Mingazov (Russian: Мара́т Фирду́сович Минга́зов; Tatar: Марат Фирдус улы Мингазов; born 21 November 1994, Yoshkar-Ola), better known under the pseudonym Sqwoz Bab (Russian: Сквозь Баб) is a Russian comedy rapper.

== Biography ==
From a young age he was involved in KVN, and in high school he was a cadet in the drug control department.

After his first album's release, Mingazov was noticed by artists The Chemodan, Kyivstoner, and Big Russian Boss, who invited him to open for their concerts. Mingazov later recorded songs with Big Russian Boss and Kyivstoner.

On October 9, 2020, the official music video for the track "Oy" was released.

His fifth studio album, FlowJob, was released on November 19, 2021. Hip-hop portal The Flow placed the album at number 26 on its "Top 50 Russian Albums of 2021."

On October 6, 2023, Mingazov presented his eighth studio album, Out of Bounds.

On March 13, 2026, the studio album "Womanizer" was released, featuring singer Lida and the group "Vorvaiki", and the producer of the album was the musician Travma.

== Discography ==
=== Studio albums ===
- 2018 — Pussy sultan
- 2019 — Turbo
- 2020 — Body Language
- 2020 — Ringtone demo final mix 123 dfghfw
- 2021 — Flowjob
- 2022 — Ringtone demo final mix 2
- 2022 — 2 Boyz No Cap (with Dzharakhov)
- 2023 — Out of Bounds
- 2026 — Womanizer

== Videography ==
- 2018 — "Ебеня"
- 2018 — "Грабим пятёрочку"
- 2018 — Dzharakhov х Vitya АК х Urgant х Sqwoz Bab х Slava KPSS — "Дисс псов на Волочкову"
- 2018 — "Ебеня"
- 2019 — "Чувство такта"
- 2019 — "Шашлычки"
- 2019 — "Адлер"
- 2020 — "Рахат лукум"
- 2020 — "Не бабушка"
- 2020 — "Бывший" (with Khleb)
- 2020 — "Ой"
- 2021 — "Ламба" (with Роланом)
- 2021 — "Братва на связи" (with GONE.Fludd & Blago White)
- 2021 — "Gender"
- 2022 — "Big Stacks" (with Lil Glock 420)
- 2022 — "Запрещёнка" (with Джараховым)
- 2023 — "Колхозница" (with Alon)
- 2023 — "Пётр 1"
- 2024 — "Озеро в лесу"
- 2024 — "Пых-Пых"
- 2025 — "Tokyo"
- 2025 — "Baza"
