= Mona (singer) =

Russian singer (born 1996)

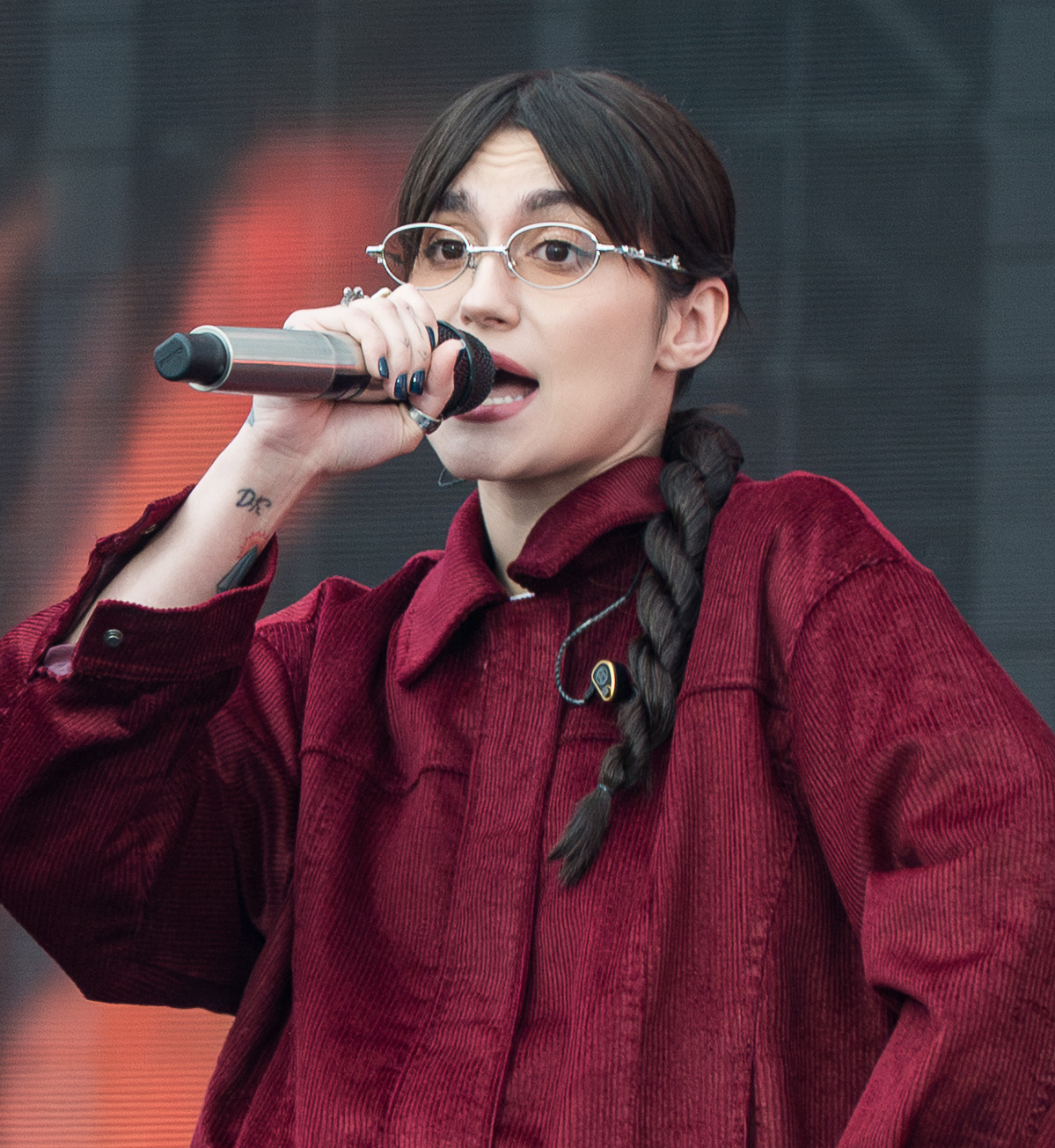
- Mona performing at VK Fest, St. Peterburg in 2025

Background information
- Born: Daria Andreeva Kustovskaya (Russian: Дарья Андреевна Кустовская); November 5, 1996 (age 29); Rostov-on-Don, Rostov Oblast, Russia
- Occupations: Singer; songwriter
- Years active: 2022-present
- Label: RAAVA Music

Mona (real name: Daria Andreevna Kustovskaya (Russian: Дарья Андреевна Кустовская; born 5 November 1996, Rostov-on-Don) is a Russian singer and songwriter. She is signed to RAAVA Music and VK Records.

She has wrote songs for artists like Zivert, Mot, Elman, Philipp Kirkorov and Dava.

In 2025, she participated in the sixth season of the show "Mask" on the NTV channel as a Dalmatian and took second place.

== Personal life ==
From June 2024 until December 2025, she has been in a relationship with rapper and blogger Eldar Dzharakhov.

== Discography ==
=== Albums ===
Title	Details
«Дневник памяти»	Release: 8 November 2024; Label: RAAVA Music / VK Records; Format: Digital

=== As a guest singer ===
Year	Artist	Title	Album
2022	Elman	«Чёрная любовь»	Non-album single
2022	Elman	«Истерика»	Non-album single
2023	Andro	«Зари»	Non-album single
2023	Elman	«Пустые вечера»	Non-album single
2023	Три дня дождя	«Прощание»	«melancholia»
2023	Basta	«Не забывай меня»	Non-album single
2024	Navai	«Есенин»	«Как Есенин»
2024	Basta	«Худи»	Non-album single
2025	Dzharakhov	«Звони, когда захочешь»	«Эл»
2025	Loc-Dog	«На расстоянии»	«16/36»

== Videography ==
=== Music videos ===
Year	Video	Director(s)
2022	"Ну и че?"	N/A
2022	"Чёрная любовь"	N/A
2022	"Истерика"	Diana Rogoznikova
2023	"Зари"	Vladislav Kostin
2024	"Дороже золота"	Sergey Kazenkin / Ivan Faleev
2025	"Иордан"	Sasha Sakharnaya

=== Videoconcerts ===
Year	Title	Place
2024	«LIVE на Новом Радио»	5 songs
2024	«LIVE на AvtoRadio»	8 songs
2025	«LIVE на Like FM»	8 songs
