= Melon Music (Russia) =

Record label based in Tyumen, Russia

- Founded: 2017; 9 years ago
- Founder: Lil Melon
- Genre: Rap; Trap; Drill
- Country of origin: Russia

Melon Music is a group of rappers from Tyumen, Russia, created in 2017 after the death of Lil Melon.

== History ==
=== 2015—2016: Acquaintance ===
In 2015, Seemee met Yungway at a rap festival in Tyumen. OG Buda met Lil Melon during his summer vacation in Tyumen, when he was still living in Budapest and visiting his hometown a couple of times a year. At the same time, Lil Melon took out a two-thousand ruble loan from Mayot, but instead of repaying the debt, he offered to record a track in his home studio.

== Composition ==
=== Current members ===
- OG Buda — rapper
- Mayot — rapper
- Seemee —rapper
- 163onmyneck — rapper
- Yungway — rapper
- DooMee — rapper, record producer
- Gansy — rapper, record producer
- TonySouljah — rapper, record producer
- WeedTAKKA — record producer
