= Dragonborn =

Dragonborn may refer to:

== Gaming ==
- Dragonborn (Dungeons & Dragons), a Draconic race from the Dungeons & Dragons role playing game
- Dragonborn, a player character in The Elder Scrolls V: Skyrim who has the blood and soul of a dragon
  - The Elder Scrolls V: Skyrim – Dragonborn, an expansion set for Skyrim

== Music ==
- Dragonborn, musician who performed the opening theme song "The Words" on the television show Dicte
- Dragonborn (album), a 2018 album by Big Baby Tape
- "Dragonborn" (song), a song by Jeremy Soule as the theme song for Skyrim
- "Dragonborn", a cover of the Jeremy Soule song by Headhunterz from the album Sacrifice
- "Dragonborn", a 2023 song by Twilight Force from At the Heart of Wintervale
