= Molodoj Platon =

Russian rapper (born 2004)

Molodoj Platon Молодой Платон
- Born: Platon Viktorovich Stepashin (Плато́н Ви́кторович Степа́шин); November 24, 2004 (age 21); Moscow, Russia
- Genres: Hip Hop
- Occupation: Rapper

Platon Viktorovich Stepashin (Russian: Плато́н Ви́кторович Степа́шин; born 24 November 2004), better known by his stage name Molodoy Platon, is a Russian rapper.

== Biography ==
Platon Viktorovich Stepashin was born 24 November 2004 in Moscow. As a child he took up soccer. At a young age he became interested in pop music, thus auditioned for vocal and pop music singing on the show "The Voice Kids", but did not get the role.

In 2018, after appearing on "РНБ Клуб" and the rise of Big Baby Tape's popularity, he realized he wanted to do something similar. He began his music career in October 2019 at 14 years old, releasing his debut single and then, in November, his debut album. He credits his inspiration to the singer Matt Ox, who also started music at a young age.

== Discography ==
=== Albums ===
Title	Details	List of tracks	Highest place on chart
Title	Details	List of tracks	(Russia) Russia Apple Music
Long-play albums
«Цум»	Release: 22 November 2019; Label: StartUp Music; Format: Digital Streaming	List: # «Цум»; 1. «Puma»; 2. «Ralph Lauren»; 3. «Palm Angels» (with 13Kai); 4. «Calvin Klein»; 5. «Vlone» (with 163onmyneck); 6. «Fear of God»	—
Son of Trap	Release: 1 July 2021; Label: Universal; Format: Digital Streaming	List: # «Diagnoz»; 1. «Big Lil»; 2. «Kater» (with Big Baby Tape); 3. «Kitchen»; 4. «Trapaholic»; 5. «Freaky» (with Alizade); 6. «Mexico»; 7. «Fall in Lova» (with The Limba); 8. «World»; 9. «Gromche» (with Goody); 10. «Igrok»; 11. «Holod» (with Blago White); 12. «Project Baby»; 13. «Gold Teeth»; 14. «Malyutki» (with DopeVvs); 15. «Krasota»; 16. «Rich Russian Kid»	6
Mini albums
In da Club	Release: 11 December 2020; Label: Warner; Format: Digital Streaming	List: # «In da Club»; 1. «Pull Up»; 2. «VIP»; 3. «Cocktail»; 4. «Haribo»; 5. «Afterparty»	—

=== Singles ===
Year	Title	Album
2019	«Cola & Sprite» with Kassi)	Non-album single
2019	«Роллы» (with Kelyukhh & WormGanger)	Non-album single
2020	«Маладой»	Non-album single
2020	«NHL 2020»	Non-album single
2020	«Voda»	Non-album single
2021	«Lifestyle»	Non-album single
2021	«Diagnoz»	Son of Trap
2021	«Kozlina»	Non-album single
2021	«Девственник»	Non-album single
2021	«Влюбилась» (with Big Baby Tape)	Non-album single
2022	«Трэп королева»	Non-album single
2022	«Школьник» (with Пошлой Молли)	Non-album single
2022	«Don't Play, Bae» (with Пошлой Молли and Yanix)	Non-album single
2022	«Понтуюсь»	Non-album single
2022	«I Love My Life» (with Blago White and Джарахов)	Non-album single

=== Songs on Charts ===
Track	Highest position on chart		
Track	(Russia) Russia Apple Music	(Russia) Russia Spotify	VK Music
«Влюбилась» (with Big Baby Tape)	9	8	8
«Don't Play, Bae» (with Пошлой Молли and Yanix)	10	—	11
Symbol «—» means lack of information of the charter of the song.

=== On albums of others singers ===
Year	Album	Singers	Track	
2020	Tha Malchik	Blago White	«UGG®»	
2020	«Карусель»	13Kai and Kassi	«Ртуть»	
2020	«Правило»	Pharaoh	«Тост»	
2020	Off / On	Index	«SMS»	
2021	Dead Love 2 (Deluxe)	May Wave$	«Хулиганка»	
2021	Come Back	Doni	«Мухи» (with Ганвест)	Осн.

== Videography ==
Videoclip of song
Year	Track
2021	«Diagnoz»
