= ELMAN =

Russian-Azerbaijani singer (born 1993)

ELMAN Elman Elman oğlu Zeynalov
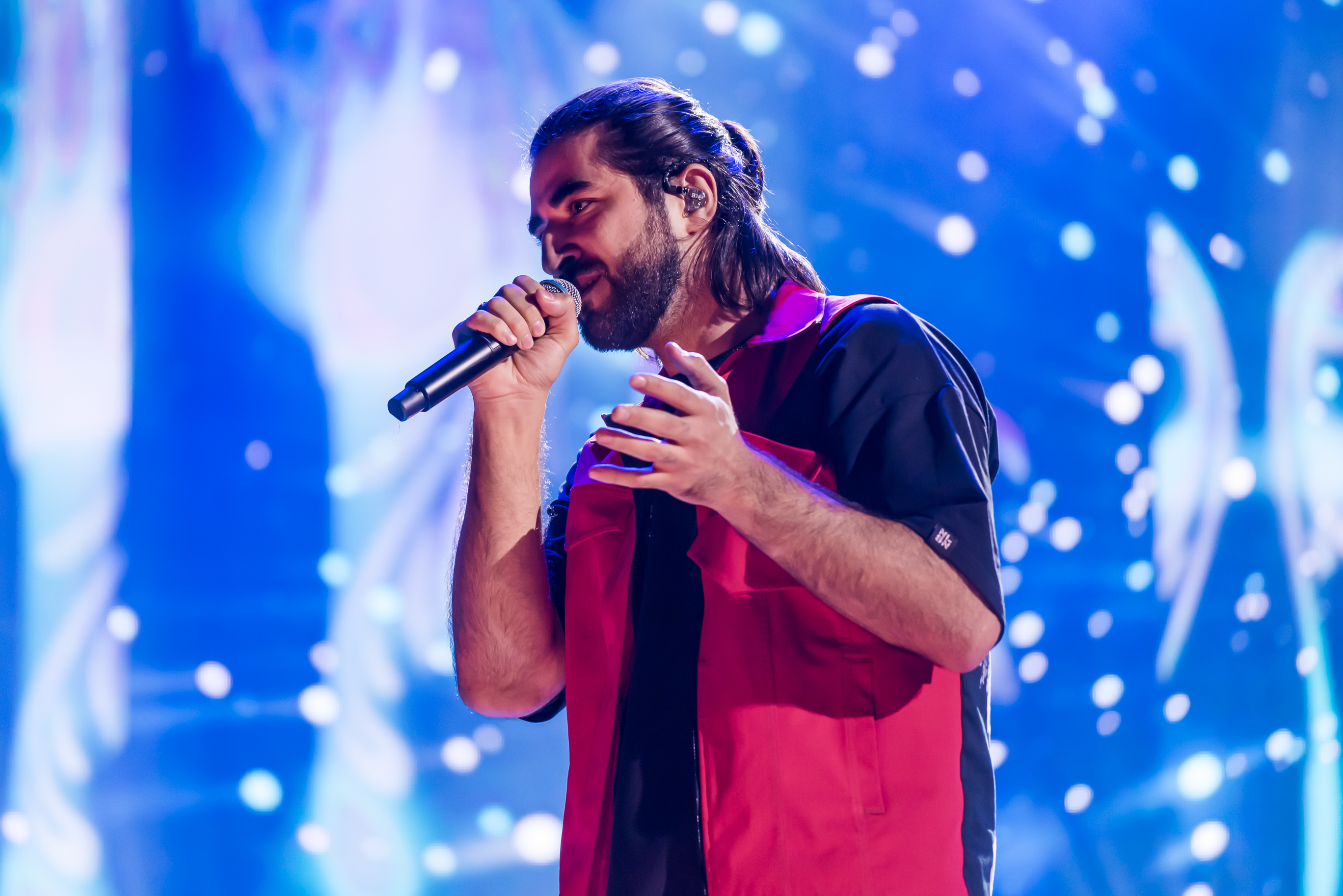

Background information
- Born: 18 November 1993 (age 32); Sumgait, Azerbaijan
- Genres: Rap; Pop
- Occupation: Music singer
- Labels: Warner Music Russia; RAAVA Music

ELMAN (Russian: Эльман Эльман оглы Зейналов; Azerbaijani: Elman Elman oğlu Zeynalov; born 18 November 1993) is a Russian singer and musician, who created the label RAAVA Music.

== Biography ==
=== Early life ===
Elman Zeynalov was born on 18 November 1993 in Sumgait. His father died before he was born, and thus his mother and stepfather raised him. When Elman was still a child, his family moved to Shakhty, where he spent his childhood. Elman went to school and practiced judo. After he finished school he attended Rostov State Transport University (Ростовский государственный университет путей сообщения) and at 17 years old moved out of his parents' house. At this time he learned music, but did not receive professional education for it.

=== Music career ===
In 2017 Elman released the song «Адреналин», and his contract with Warner Music Russia ended. That year he participated in the show Fabrika Zvoyzd on Muz-TV, taking 4th place. his producer was Viktor Drobysh, but his contract was eventually terminated. He wrote cover verses for popular songs and posted them to Instagram. In 2018, Elman started the label RAAVA Music, signing at the time three artists — Andro, JONY and himself, as well as a sound engineer.

=== Personal life ===
Elman married Margarite Tsoi on 6 December 2019. The couple have one child, a girl named Mariel who was born in 2020.

== Discography ==
=== Solo tracks ===
Year	Date	Title	Min	Album
2017	30 Apr.	Адреналин	4:00	«Адреналин»
2017	30 Apr.	Адреналин (Harmo & Vibes Remix)	3:13	«Адреналин»
2017	30 Apr.	Адреналин (Ayshot Prod. Remix)	3:38	«Адреналин»
2018	2 Feb.	Мой океан	3:50	Non-album single
2018	9 Sep.	Спаси меня	2:51	Non-album single
2019	10 Apr.	Уставший город	2:54	Non-album single
2019	6 Jun.	Антигерой	2:45	Non-album single
2019	1 Aug.	Нирвана	2:48	Non-album single
2019	7 Nov.	Лети	2:34	Non-album single
2020	23 Jan.	Loki	2:16	Non-album single
2020	10 Mar.	Мечта	2:15	Non-album single
2020	18 Nov.	Муза	2:00	«Муза»
2021	30 Apr.	Родная	3:09	Non-album single
2021	18 Jun.	Друг	3:24	Non-album single
2021	16 Jul.	Атлантида	2:19	Non-album single
2021	27 Aug.	Босоногая	2:01	Non-album single
2022	4 Feb.	Самолёт бумажный	2:07	Non-album single
2022	22 Apr.	Сердце винтаж	1:51	Non-album single

=== Tracks with other singers ===
Year	Date	Title	Min	Singers	Album
2016	12 Nov.	Танцуют ангелы	3:00	Maria Grai & El'man	Non-album single
2017	29 Dec.	Невесомость	2:42	Black Cupro & El'man	Non-album single
2018	22 June.	Дважды	2:59	El'man & Sam Vardi	Non-album single
2019	22 Jan.	Замело	2:43	El'man & Andro	Non-album single
2019	11 Mar.	Кроссы	2:19	El'man & Jony	Non-album single
2020	10 Apr.	Любви достойна только мама	3:12	Bahh Tee & El'man	«10 лет спустя»
2020	14 Aug.	Секрет	3:23	Elbrus & El'man	Non-album single
2020	11 Nov.	Морозы	3:06	Gafur & El'man	Non-album single
2021	15 Jan.	Отпускаю	3:03	El'man & Gafur	«Муза»
2021	15 Jan.	Балкон	2:23	El'man & Jony	«Муза»
2021	15 Jan.	Я тебе верил	3:07	El'man & Andro	«Муза»
2021	1 Oct.	Моя душа	2:40	Ramiz & El'man	Non-album single
2021	15 Oct.	С неба до земли	2:25	El'man & Orxan	Non-album single
2022	5 Aug.	Чёрная любовь	2:58	El'man & Mona	Non-album single
2022	16 Sep.	Круз	2:24	El'man & Andro	Non-album single
2022	18 Nov.	Истерика	2:35	El'man & Mona	Non-album single
2023	24 Mar.	Зари	2:52	El'man, Toni, Andro & Mona	Non-album single

=== Videoclips ===
Year	Date	Title	Director
2018	23 Apr.	Мой океан	Maria Skobeleva
2019	10 Apr.	Уставший город	Dimash Maymakov
2019	30 Sep.	Антигерой	Andrei Kovalyov
2019	24 Dec.	Лети	N/A
2020	15 Dec.	Морозы	Dimash Maymakov
2021	15 Oct.	С неба до земли (Mood video)	N/A
2022	10 Sep.	Чёрная любовь	N/A
2022	18 Jan.	Истерика	Diana Rogoznikova
2023	4 Apr.	Зари	N/A
