= Andro (singer) =

Russian rapper (born 2001)

- Born: Иоанн Жани Кузнецов; January 19, 2001 (age 25); Kyiv, Ukraine
- Origin: Ukraine
- Genres: Hip hop; R&B; pop
- Occupations: Rapper; singer
- Years active: 2014–present
- Label: Raava Music

Ioann Zhani Kuznetsov (Russian: Иоанн Жани Кузнецов; born 19 January 2001), known professionally as Andro, is a Ukrainian-born Russian Roma rapper and singer.

== Biography ==
Kuznetsov was born on 19 January 2001 in Kyiv into a Romani family.

In 2014 he rose to fame when he wrote the vocals to the song «Санта Лючия» by the group Quest Pistols.

In 2016, Andro released his debut single «Удиви меня».

In January 2019, Andro released the song «Замело». In March 2019, he released the song «Инопланетянин», which reached top 9 and stayed for 12 months on the charts on Shazam. In August 2019, Andro placed on the VK chart with the song «Болен твоей улыбкой», and again in December with the song «Моя душа».

In September 2019, Andro released his debut album «MoonFlame», which placed in the top 10 on the Russian charts of Apple Music. Music critic Alexei Mazhaev of InterMedia gave Andro a 7/10 for the album: "the album demonstrates the talent, musicality and sense of taste of Andro, but there is a lack of variety and Andro keeps to the same style too much".

In March 2020 he released the song «Мадам», featuring Jony, which topped the charts on VK (service) and Apple Music.

In May 2020, Andro released the single «X.O.», with The Limba, which entered the charts on VK and Apple Music. The song entered the top 10 for most popular songs on Apple Music in Russia, and Top-5 on the VK charts.

In March 2021, Andro and rapper Scriptonite released the song «Dragon», which placed highly on various internet charts.

In 2021 Andro released his second studio album «Jani Gipsy», which placed in the Тop 10 on the Russian charts on Apple Music.

In 2023, Andro announced he would be releasing his third studio album.

In the spring of 2023, Andro, along with ELMAN, TONI, and MONA (from Raava Music Label), presented the release of the track "Зари".

== Discography ==
=== Albums ===
- 2019 — «Moon Flame»
- 2021 — «Jani Gipsy»

=== Singles ===
- 2016 — «Удиви меня»
- 2018 — «Я бачу»
- 2019 — «Замело» (feat. El'man)
- 2019 — «Ночной рейс»
- 2019 — «Моя душа»
- 2019 — «Инопланетянин»
- 2019 — «Другому»
- 2019 — «Болен твоей улыбкой»
- 2020 — «Мадам» (feat. Jony)
- 2020 — «Купидон»
- 2020 — «X.O.» (feat. The Limba)
- 2020 — «Забываю обещания»
- 2020 — «Megamix» (feat. Jony, El'man & Gafur)
- 2020 — «Гипноз» (feat. Qontrast & Hiro)
- 2020 — «Любит пироги»
- 2020 — «Спокойная ночь» («Кино» cover)
- 2021 — «Dragon» (feat. Scriptonite)
- 2021 — «Никаких эмоций» (feat. The Limba & Navai)
- 2021 — «Подруга» (feat. Andy Panda)
- 2021 — «Чокопай» (feat. Rakhim & Blago White)
- 2021 — «Черёмушка» (feat. Jony)
- 2022 — «Как не любить»
- 2022 — «Губы»
- 2022 — «Осень» (feat. Basta)
- 2022 — «Телефон» (feat. Mayot)
- 2022 — «Мой брат»
- 2022 — «Круз» (feat. El'man)
- 2022 — «Соври» (feat. TONI)
- 2022 — «Разожги во мне огонь» (feat. Rakhim)
- 2023 — «Зари» (feat. ELMAN, TONI, MONA)

== Videos ==
- 2016 — «Удиви меня»
- 2018 — «Я бачу»
- 2019 — «Моя душа»
- 2019 — «Инопланетянин»
- 2019 — «Красивая»
- 2020 — «Купидон»
- 2020 — «X.O.»
- 2020 — «Забываю обещания»
- 2020 — «Megamix»
- 2020 — «Гипноз»
- 2022 — «Как не любить»
- 2022 — «Губы»
- 2023 — «Дай мне только шанс»

== Awards and nominations ==
Nominations

- 2021 — Nominated by «Жара Music Awards» in the category «Internet-hit».
