= Anikv =

Georgian musician (born 1995)

- Born: Anna Karenovna Onanova; April 29, 1995 (age 31); Tbilisi, Georgia
- Origin: Russia
- Genres: Hip hop; pop; R&B; soul
- Occupations: Singer; songwriter; composer
- Years active: 2015-present
- Label: Gazgolder (2019-present)

Anna Onanova or Anna Purtsen, better known as Anikv (Аника), is a Russian multi-genre music singer and songwriter who is signed to the record label Gazgolder.

== Biography and music career ==
On 3 March 2023 she released her second album titled Broken Season, streamed exclusively on VK Music.

== Discography ==
=== Studio albums ===
Title	Details
«Старше»	Release: 15 May 2020; Label: Gazgolder; Format: digital, streaming
Broken Season	Release: 3 March 2023; Label: Gazgolder; Format: digital, streaming

=== Mini-albums ===
Title	Details
«Киносеанс»	Release: 4 December 2020; Label: Gazgolder; Format: digital distribution, streaming

=== Singles ===
Year	Single	Highest charted position	
Year	Single	(Lithuania) Lithuania AGATA	(Russia) Russia Billboard
2018	Bad Lines	—	×
2018	Damn	—	×
2019	«Мис ю»	—	×
2019	«Ламбада» (featuring Smoky D)	—	×
2019	«Яд»	—	×
2019	Be Myself (featuring Kirill Mednikova)	—	×
2019	Virgin School Love	—	×
2019	Ballerina	—	×
2019	«Ярко»	—	×
2019	«Женщина плачет»	—	×
2020	«Путаница»	—	×
2020	«Меня не будет» (featuring Saluki)	—	×
2020	Criminal	—	×
2020	«Было или нет»	—	×
2020	«До свидания»	—	×
2021	«Слёз из хрусталя»	—	×
2021	«О чём мечтать?»	—	×
2021	«Там где хорошо»	—	×
2021	«ВПНП» (featuring Vacío)	—	×
2022	«Огни» (featuring Saluki)	—	12
2022	«Тесно» (with Aarne & Bushido Zho)	51	×
2022	Secret	—	×
Symbol «—» means, that the single did not chart; symbol «×» means, that the chart was inactive.

=== Guest singer on works of other artists ===
Year	Track	Artist	Album
2019	«Алый»	Saluki	«Властелин калек»
2019	«Понт»	Saluki	«Властелин калек»
2020	«Поколение Х»	Basta, Noize MC	«Баста 40»
2020	«Белый флаг»	104	«Кино без сигарет»
2020	«Не плачешь»	Osa, N1ky	Replexia
2020	«I Wanna Feel Alright»	Gorilla Zippo, Richie	Live in Miami
2021	«Закрытый клуб»	M'Dee	Non-album single
2021	«Лавэ»	Saluki, 104, Билик	«Стыд или слава»
2021	«Гори (Remix)»	Lizer	Non-album single
2021	«Rick James»	Markul	Sense of Human
2022	«Зонт»	Feduk	Non-album single
2022	«Тесно»	Aarne	AA Language
2022	«Дорога»	Saluki	«Поколение брат»

== Videography ==
Year	Track	Director
2019	«Ярко»	Oleg Che
2020	«Меня не будет» (featuring Saluki)	Oleg Che
2021	«Были мы»	Milaslava Vybornykh
2022	«Огни» (featuring Saluki)	N/A
