= Fendi (song) =

Single by Rakhim
- Released: July 17, 2020
- Genre: Hip Hop
- Length: 2:08
- Producer: Slava Marlow

"Fendi" is a song by Russian hip-hop singer Rakhim. It was released on 17 July 2020 as a non-label single, produced by Slava Marlow. The song was recorded after he Rakhim purchased a jacket from the brand Fendi.

== History ==
A record 3.2 million videos used the song for the Russian segment of the social media site TikTok. In 2020, the song landed on the list of most popular TikTok songs & top-30 tracks according to the social site VK.

== Music video ==
The official release for the track's music video was on 12 October 2020. Within 24 hours, the video gathered 1.2 million views.

Vladislav Shein of TNT Music compared the video with "a fragment of an action film" and noted that the video has dark colors.

== Conflicts ==
In September 2020, Russian rapper Gunwest released the song "Fendi2", which completely copies the chorus from the song "Fendi". Before the song's release, Gunwest wrote: "There is only one original, and that's mine". Rakhim did not like this, and the two had a clash.
