= Mayot (singer) =

Russian rapper (born 1999)

- Born: Artyom Gennadievich Nikitin (Russian: Артём Генна́дьевич Ники́тин); February 2, 1999 (age 27); Tyumen, Russia
- Genres: Hip-Hop
- Occupations: Rapper; singer; songwriter
- Label: Random Crew

Artyom Gennadievich Nikitin (Russian: Артём Геннадьевич Никитин; born 2 February 1999, Tyumen), better known as Mayot, is a Russian rapper and singer and member of the record association Melon Music.

== Biography ==
Artyom Gennadievich Nikitin was born on 2 February 1999 in Tyumen.

According to Artyom's words, he became interested in music as a child because his father played the guitar for him. His dad worked as a physical education teacher and prioritized sports. The boy went to gymnastics, taekwondo, and also practiced boxing, not thinking about musical creativity.

During elementary school, in the second grade, he began to practice playing the guitar. Later, he learned about rock, which opened for him the musical world in a new way: everything he heard was at variance with the usual knowledge about music, which he had received earlier — "solfeggio, musical notation". So he started to learn on his own using tutorials on YouTube.

In 8th grade, he began to take up guitar less as he began a period of constant partying.

== Discography ==
=== Albums ===
List of albums with details
Title	Details	List of tracks	Highest charted position
Title	Details	List of tracks	(Russia) Russia Apple Music
Long-play albums
B-Polar, Pt. 2	Release: 1 November 2018; Label: C+; Format: digital, streaming	List: # «В огне»; 1. «Rain»; 2. «Плати»; 3. «Перепутал»; 4. «Bye» (feat. Seemee); 5. «О чувствах» (feat. Маленького ярче); 6. «Drugs»	—
Scum Off the Pot (with Seemee)	Release: 19 April 2019; Label: CPlus; Format: digital, streaming	List: # «Xanny» (feat. 163onmyneck); 1. «High Definition»; 2. «Double Troubles»; 3. «Choppa» (feat. OG Buda); 4. «Scum Off the Pot»; 5. «Hit 2wice Freestyle»; 6. «Бонсай» (feat. Маленького ярче); 7. «Shiver Outro»	—
Ghetto Garden	Release: 4 September 2020; Label: CPlus; Format: digital, streaming	List: # «Торчи» (feat. OG Buda); 1. «Ауди» (feat. Bushido Zho & Seemee); 2. «Дождь»; 3. «Тигр»; 4. «Потратил» (feat. Yungway); 5. «Море» (feat. Feduk); 6. «Сон»; 7. «Лилия»; 8. «Забыл всё» (feat. G Ban & Seemee); 9. «Мото-мото»; 10. «Я прав»; 11. «Чипсы» (feat. Blago White, Seemee & Thrill Pill); 12. «Звезда упала»; 13. «Джинсы» (feat. OG Buda); 14. «Нинтендо» (feat. Doomee); 15. «Кен блок»; 16. «Снег»; 17. «Без пальтишка»; 18. «Впадлу (Slow)» (feat. Seemee & 163onmyneck)	3
«Заправка кид»	Release: 25 December 2020; Label: CPlus; Format: digital, streaming	List: # «Ёлки»; 1. «Фагаю»; 2. «Дерьмо»; 3. «Не ЗОЖ»; 4. «Колпак»; 5. «Накипь»; 6. «21»; 7. «Попкорн»	—
«Заправка кид 2»	Release: 26 March 2021; Label: CPlus; Format: digital, streaming	List: # «Абонент»; 1. «Калека»; 2. «Форсаж»; 3. «Двойники»; 4. «Приятного аппетита»; 5. «Лондон»; 6. «MJ»; 7. «Киллер»; 8. «May Wave$»; 9. «Шрамы»; 10. «Dope»	—
Scum Off the Pot 2 (with Seemee)	Release: 24 June 2022; Label: CPlus; Format: digital, streaming	List: # «Техника (Intro)»; 1. «Blessed»; 2. «Big Pun»; 3. «Первые»; 4. «Mike Amiri» (feat. Sid); 5. «2>1»; 6. «Генерал Таиланда»; 7. «Пашем»; 8. «Тирм» (feat. OG Buda); 9. «На волне»; 10. «Money Twerk»; 11. «Дружба народов» (feat. Hood Rich Luka); 12. «Швабра»; 13. «Бабара / Babina»; 14. «Прирост / Narcoz»; 15. «Хороший Smoking»; 16. «Old72»; 17. «Face ID» (feat. 163onmyneck); 18. «2 пака»; 19. «Draco» (feat. Bushido Zho); 20. «Spartak» (feat. Scally Milano); 21. «Эээбля»; 22. «+1 Frag»; 23. «Igra (Outro)»	—
«Заправка кид 3»	Release: 23 December 2022; Label: CPlus; Format: digital, streaming	List: # «Intro»; 1. «Flowmaster»; 2. «На моём месте»; 3. «Вандализм»; 4. «Дел нету»; 5. «Насморк»; 6. «Изо»; 7. «4»; 8. «Push»; 9. «Jake Paul»; 10. «Оппонент не вывез»; 11. «Hakuna Matata»; 12. «Воскресенье»; 13. «Ножевое»; 14. «У нас»; 15. «Oxycodone (BonusTrack)» (feat. Fendiglock)	—
Mini-albums
FendiMayot (with Fendiglock)	Release: 15 May 2020; Label: CPlus; Format: digital, streaming	List: # «Ботанический сад»; 1. «Много дел»; 2. «Дубина»; 3. «Корова»	—
Gems72 (with Yungway & Sqweezey)	Release: 7 May 2021; Label: CPlus; Format: digital, streaming	List: # «Не про полночь»; 1. «Высоко»; 2. «Созвездия»; 3. «Болтовня»	—
Symbol «—» means no information about charts and/or absence of charting

=== Singles ===
List of singles with details
Year	Title	Other singers		Album
Year	Title	Main singer	Featured singers	Album
As lead singer
2018	«Лимонад»	Маленький ярче	—	Non-album single
2019	«Afro»	Seemee	—	Non-album single
2019	«Ротик на замок»	Seemee	—	Non-album single
2019	«Lovepain»	Seemee	163onmyneck; Yungway	Non-album single
2019	«Не сплю»	—	4n Way	Non-album single
2019	«Biography»	163onmyneck	—	Non-album single
2019	«На мне»	OG Buda; Magnum Opus	—	Non-album single
2019	«Впадлу»	Seemee	163onmyneck	Non-album single
2019	«Снег»	—	—	Ghetto Garden
2020	«War»	Bushido Zho	—	Non-album single
2020	«Mjsm»	Jabo	Seemee; Marco-9	Non-album single
2020	«Под капюшон»	Lovv66	—	Non-album single
2020	«White Force Alert»	—	—	Non-album single
2020	«Дрипики»	Soda Luv	—	Non-album single
2020	«Свист»	Jabo	Seemee	Non-album single
2020	«Камни»	—	—	Non-album single
2020	«Море»	—	—	Non-album single
2020	«Звезда упала» (VisaGangBeatz & Maalice Remix)	—	—	Non-album single
2021	«Цветок»	Seemee; Lovv66	—	Puzzles
2021	«Добро пожаловать»	OG Buda	—	Non-album single
2021	«Новенький»	Magnum Opus	—	Non-album single
2021	«В моих мыслях»	—	—	Non-album single
2021	«Гори»	Lizer	—	Non-album single
2021	«Mixtape»	—	—	Non-album single
2021	«Пламя»	G4our	—	Non-album single
2021	«Вина»	OG Buda	17 Seventeen	Non-album single
2021	«Пламя» (Boris Redwall Remix)	G4our; Boris Redwall	—	Non-album single
2022	«Отпустил»	—	—	Non-album single
2022	«Дриблинг»	—	—	Non-album single
2022	«Поближе»	G4our	—	Non-album single
2022	«Прощай»	—	—	Non-album single
2022	«На волне»	Seemee	—	Non-album single
2022	«Солнце Монако» (Tha Remix)	Lusia Chebotina; Blago White	—	Non-album single
2022	«Tом4т»	Quin3D!	—	Non-album single
2022	«Summertime»	Guf	—	Non-album single
2022	«Лэйт Найт Скул» (Original Series Soundtrack)	Seemee	—	Non-album single
2022	«Два выстрела»	Mary Gu	—	Non-album single
As featured singer
2019	«Спи спокойно»	Seemee	163onmyneck	
2020	«Без названия»	Rvmzes; Jughead	Seemee	Visa Mode
2020	«Cod Freestyle»	VisaGangBeatz	MellowBite; Loco OG Rocka	
2020	«Мысли»	Jabo	—	Kout4real
2020	«Gaz»	Kout	—	Con Dios
2020	«Сытым»	Marco-9	—	«18/81»
2021	«Good»	LowLife	Baby19!	
2021	«Водопад»	VisaGangBeatz	Jabo; Seemee	«Сириус»
2021	«Мимо»	White Punk	—	
2021	«Бизнес»	VisaGangBeatz	Seemee; 163onmyneck	
2021	«Помню»	Маленький ярче	—	
2021	«Бизнес» (Boris Redwall & Tekraw Remix)	VisaGangBeatz	Seemee; 163onmyneck	
2021	«Мимо» (Remix)	White Punk; Treepside	—	
2022	«В такт»	Danchainz	Blago White	
2022	«Телефон»	Andro	—	
2022	«Будни»	May Wave$	—	
2022	«Бизнес» (Phonk Remix)	Rhodamine	Seemee; 163onmyneck	
2022	«Йупи йо»	Scally Milano	163onmyneck	Non-album single
2023	«Танцуй со мной»	GeeGun	Vacio	Non-album single
Symbol «—» means no other artists' single.

=== Guest on other singers' albums ===
List of albums with participation and details
Year	Album		Track			
Year	Title	Singer	Title	Other singers		
Year	Title	Singer	Title	Lead singer	Featured singer	
Long-play albums
2019	Jabo Season	Jabo	«Hell»	—	Seemee	
2019	«2020»	Jabo	«Хочу больше»	—	—	
2019	«Опг сити»	OG Buda	«Всё равно»	—	—	
2019	«К сожалению это трап»	Bushido Zho	«No Melody. Part 1»	—	Seemee	
2020	Visa Mode	VisaGangBeatz	«Гринч»	—	Seemee	
2020	Visa Mode	VisaGangBeatz	«Cod Freestyle»	—	MellowBite; Loco OG Rocka	
2020	Way	Yungway	«Moment»	—	—	
2020	«Московские хроники»	Thrill Pill	«Дима Билан»	—	—	
2020	Jabo Season 2	Jabo	«Мэрилин Монро»	—	—	
2020	Magic	Seemee; Yungway	«Plamya Havaet»	—	—	
2020	Mungam	Magnum Opus	«Vремя»	—	—	
2020	Kout4real	Kout	«Gaz»	—	—	
2020	Myasa	Blago White	«Karuptsi»	—	OG Buda; Plohoyparen; Thrill Pill	
2020	Viva La Vida	Soda Luv	«Попробуй возьми»	—	—	
2020	«2021»	Jabo	«Время»	—	—	
2020	Ghetto Mellow Melon Bite Christmas	Mellowbite; 163onmyneck	«Гирлянды»	—	—	
2021	Fendiglock	Fendiglock	«Тайна»	—	—	
2021	Puzzles	Lovv66	«Ловв и Майот»	—	—	
2021	Puzzles	Lovv66	«Цветок»	Seemee	—	
2021	Pinq Tastish	Pinq	«Разгон»	Seemee	—	
2021	«18/81»	LowLife	«Good»	—	Baby19!	feat.
2021	«Стыд или слава»	Saluki; 104	«Kelin»	—	OG Buda; «Кисло-Сладкий & Bonah»	feat.
2021	Con Dios	Marco-9	«Сытым»	—	—	feat.
2021	Trap Symphony	Killjoy	«Палево»	—	—	feat.
2021	Leave Your Bones	Pretty Scream	«Ты»	—	—	lead
2021	Txc	Seemee	«Windows»	—	—	feat.
2021	Txc	Seemee	«Микро»	—	—	feat.
2021	«18/81» (Slow&Rev)	LowLife	«Good» (Slow&Rev)	—	Baby19!	feat.
2021	Pussy Boy	Egor Kreed	«Puff»	—	—	feat.
2021	Welcome 2 Reap	G4our	«Растет»	—	—	lead.
2021	Welcome 2 Reap	G4our	«Детка»	—	—	lead.
2021	Welcome 2 Reap	G4our	«Растет» (Slow & Glitch) [Bonus Track]	—	—	lead.
2021	«Где плохой поц?»	Plohoyparen	«Химикаты»	—	—	feat.
2021	«5 элемент»	August	«Демоны»	—	—	feat.
2021	«5 элемент»	August	«Экзотика»	Kout	—	lead.
2021	Sosa Muzik	Платина	«Abu Dhabi Ba6y»	OG Buda	—	lead.
2021	«Сириус»	White Punk	«Мимо»	—	—	feat.
2021	Ecstasy	Fendiglock	«Уборщик»	—	—	lead.
2021	Roomination	Soda Luv	«Держи руками»	—	—	feat.
2021	«Живи и радуйся, жнец»	G4our	«Пламя»	—	—	lead.
2022	No Offence	163onmyneck	«Артур»	—	—	lead.
2022	No Bang! Hold On!	Bushido Zho	«В хлам»	—	—	feat.
2022	No Bang! Hold On!	Bushido Zho	«Шоколадки» (Bonus Track Freestyle)	—	—	feat.
2022	Fendiglock 2	Fendiglock	«Не по плану»	—	—	feat.
2022	Fendiglock 2	Fendiglock	«Аллилуйя»	—	—	feat.
2022	«Живи и радуйся, жнец» (Deluxe)	G4our	«Пламя»	—	—	lead.
2022	«Живи и радуйся, жнец» (Deluxe)	G4our	«Поближе»	—	—	lead.
2022	«Живи и радуйся, жнец» (Deluxe)	G4our	«Пламя» (Boris Redwall Remix)	—	—	lead.
2022	«Живи и радуйся, жнец» (Deluxe)	G4our	«Пламя» (Maiikiwassup Remix)	—	—	lead.
2022	Freerio 2	OG Buda	«Грусть 2 (Соната)»	—	—	feat.
2022	Dripskii	Маленький ярче	«Мунбут»	—	—	feat.
2022	Dripskii	Маленький ярче	«Помню»	—	—	feat.
2022	«Морфин дрип»	4n Way	«Запал!»	—	—	feat.
2022	«Комиксы»	No.Vel	«Первый»	—	—	lead.
2022	«Приятно познакомиться»	Nkeeei; Uniqe; Artem Shilovets	«У у у»	—	—	feat.
2023	«Cкучаю, но работаю»	OG Buda	«Касание»	—	—	feat.
Mini-albums
2020	Fendiglock's World	Fendiglock	«Благовоние»	—	—	feat.
2020	Birthday Mix 2020	Thrill Pill	«Untitled Freestyle»	—	—	feat.
2020	Birthday Mix 2020	Thrill Pill	«Part 2»	—	—	feat.
2021	Way 2	Yungway	«Трудно»	—	Seemee	feat.
2022	«Пластик»	Danchainz	«В такт»	—	Blago White	feat.
Symbol «—» means no other artists were on the album track

=== Videoclips ===
Year	Track	Director
2020	«Лилия»	Philipp Trapeznikov
2021	«Лондон»	Nikita Vilychinsky
2021	«Киллер»	Artyom Sharkho
2021	«Не про полночь»	Artyom Ignatyev
2021	«Mixtape»	Nikolai io.raw

== Ratings ==
At the end of 2021 Spotify named Mayot one of the most listened to singers of 2021 in Russia.
