= Yanix =

Russian rapper (born 1993)

- Born: Yanis Badurov; November 16, 1993 (age 32); Krasnogorsk, Moscow Oblast, Russia
- Genres: Hip Hop
- Occupation: Rapper

Yanis Bekirovich Badurov (Russian: Янис Бекирович Бадуров; born November 16, 1993, Krasnogorsk, Moscow Oblast), better known by his stage name Yanix, is a Russian hip-hop artist.

== Biography ==
Yanix was born into a family of doctors. His mother worked as a dentist in a city clinic for 30 years, while his father is a surgeon at a hospital. He excelled academically in school, but his performance was hindered by his struggle with biology, preventing him from graduating with a top-level diploma. He later completed his education at the Moscow State University of Economics, Statistics, and Informatics.

At the age of 18, Yanix had difficulty pronouncing the letter "R." To overcome this speech defect, he turned to rap music. He was drawn to the technicality of rap, particularly the fast-paced delivery. By attempting to replicate this style, he inadvertently worked on improving his diction and pronunciation. Eventually, he succeeded in pronouncing the letter "R," something even his childhood speech therapist couldn't help him with. Realizing his passion for rap, Yanix decided to pursue it further, and his efforts paid off.

== Career ==
=== 2014 ===
In October 2014, Yanix unveiled his single Nichego ili vsyo ("Nothing or Everything") from his upcoming EP. Then, on his 21st birthday, November 16, 2014, Yanix released the single Rok Star ("Rock Star") from the same EP.

=== 2017: Shou ulits getto 2,5 ===
Collaborating with DJ Nik-One, Yanix released the mixtape Shou ulits getto 2,5 ("Street Show Ghetto 2.5") on January 25, 2017. The album featured ST, Obladaet, Vlad, Face, Slim, and others. On September 27, 2017, Yanix teamed up with Thomas Mraz to release the mini-album Bla Bla Land. To conclude 2017, on December 31, Yanix unveiled the single Vniz-vverkh ("Down-Up") as a preview of his upcoming album, Poka trap ne razluchit nas ("Until Trap Separates Us").

=== 2018: Poka trap ne razluchit nas ===
On January 22, 2018, Yanix unveiled the single Pervaya liniya ("First Line") from his upcoming album, Poka trap ne razluchit nas ("Until Trap Separates Us"). Then, on February 8, 2018, Yanix released his studio album Poka trap ne razluchit nas, featuring collaborations with Face, Jacques Anthony, and Flesh. The album earned the 24th position on the Hip-Hop Portal The Flow's list of "50 Russian Albums of 2018." On September 18, Yanix released the single Bez lishnikh optsii ("No Extra Options"), expressing his critique of young rappers.

=== 2020: SS 20 ===
In Sergey Mezentsev's podcast, "Seryozha i mikrofon" ("Sergey and the Microphone"), which aired on May 27, 2020, Yanix revealed that he had never had a manager. In June 2020, Yanix released his studio album SS 20, comprising 12 tracks. The album featured collaborations with Obladaet and Gone.Fludd. On August 21, 2020, Yanix unveiled the single XXX. The music video for the track VVS was released on September 3, 2020, showcasing elements such as a white Aston Martin, a Dalmatian, a luxurious house, and a jewelry store, portraying the image of a successful rapper, as described in a review by the rap.ru portal. On October 2, 2020, Yanix released the single Mamacita. December 4, 2020, marked the release of two singles: D R.I.P. and Krasnaya pomada ("Red Lipstick"), falling within the trap and pop R&B genres, respectively.

=== 2021 ===
On June 4, 2021, Yanix teamed up with Poshlaya Molly to release the single Iz ladoni v ladon ("From Hand to Hand"). He dropped the drill genre single Mandem on April 9, 2021. Yanix released the Detroit hip-hop genre single Steik ("Steak") featuring OG Buda and 163onmyneck on June 11, 2021. On July 16, 2021, Yanix made a guest appearance in the single Papi by Bushido Zho.

=== 2022: G.O.A.T. Uslugi ===
On August 26, 2022, Yanix released his eighth studio album, G.O.A.T. Uslugi. The album featured collaborations with Dora, Lovv66, Pinq, Thomas Mraz, Noa, Tri Dnya Dozhdya, and Friendly Thug 52 Ngg.

== Discography ==
=== Studio albums ===
List of studio albums with relevant details
Title	Details
Finish Him	Release: 13 June 2011; Label: N/A; Format: streaming
«Шоу улиц гетто»	Release: 9 May 2013; Label: Dreams Come True Records; Format: digital, streaming
«Шоу улиц гетто 2»	Release: 9 May 2014; Label: Dreams Come True Records; Format: digital streaming
Block Star	Release: 11 March 2015; Label: Dreams Come True Records; Format: digital streaming
Gianni	Release: 10 February 2016; Label: Dreams Come True Records; Format: digital streaming
«Пока трэп не разлучит нас»	Release: 9 February 2018; Label: Yanix; Format: digital streaming
SS 20	Release: 3 June 2020; Label: Dreams Come True Records; Format: digital streaming
G.O.A.T. Uslugi	Release: 26 August 2022; Label: Yanix; Format: digital streaming

=== Mixtapes ===
List of mixtapes with relevant details
Title	Details
«Шоу улиц гетто 2,5»	Release: 15 January 2017; Label: Dreams Come True Records; Format: Digital streaming

=== Singles ===
==== As lead artist ====
List of singles as lead artist, showing year released and album name
Title	Year	Album
«Алкоголь»	2015	
«Кто-то ещё»	2016	
«Москва»	2016	
«Благословлён»	2016	
«Special»	2018	SS 20
«XXL»	2018	SS 20
«Hot»	2019	
«Один к десяти»	2019	
«Да или нет»	2019	SS 20
«Мув»	2019	
«XXX»	2020	
«Mamacita»	2020	
«Mandem»	2021	
«Из ладони в ладонь» (with Poshlaya Molly)	2021	
«Стейк» (with OG Buda & 163Onmyneck)	2021	
«Шоплифтер» (with 163Onmyneck, Fearmuch, Scally Milano)	2022	No Offence
«Don't Play, Bae» (with Molodoj Platon и Пошлой Молли)	2022	
«Monster Kill» (with Blago White)	2022	
«Badass» (with Soda Luv)	2022	

List of songs as guest singer, showing year released and album name
Name	Year	Album
«Wow» (Breezey Montana feat. Yanix)	2016	
«Мой день» (Платина feat. Yanix)	2018	
«Картинки из снов» (OG Buda feat. Yanix)	2019	
«Лайфстайл» (Olesya Bi feat. Yanix)	2019	
«Не верь мне» (Ураган Закат feat. Yanix & Kid Sole)	2019	
«Сердце» (Rozhden feat. Yanix)	2020	«Дорога домой»
«Красная помада» (Kid Sole feat. Yanix)	2020	Trap & B
«D R.I.P. » (Gidra feat. Yanix)	2020	2G
«Papi» (Bushido Zho feat. Yanix)	2021	

=== Other charted songs ===
Title	Year	Highest chart position				Album
Title	Year	Apple Music	(Moscow) Apple Music	Apple Music	VK Music	Album
«Вне зоны» (feat. Dora)	2022	11	8	9	18	G.O.A.T. Uslugi
«Level-Up 2»	2022	14	7	8	—	G.O.A.T. Uslugi

=== Guest singers ===
Title	Year	Other singers	Highest charted position						Album
Title	Year	Other singers	Apple Music	(Moscow) Apple Music	Apple Music	VK Music	Top Radio & YouTube Hits	Top YouTube Hits	Album
«Делаю деньги с любовью»	2014	Big Russian Boss, Young P&H	—	—	—	—	—	—	In Boss We Trust
«Ballin»	2015	Breezey Montana, Gidra	—	—	—	—	—	—	«Дар или проклятие»
«НПНБ»	2015	Мезза	—	—	—	—	—	—	«Лидер новой школы»
«На плаву»	2016	Rigos	—	—	—	—	—	—	«Время растопить лёд»
«777»	2017	Hustle Hard Flava	—	—	—	—	—	—	«Слово божье»
«Всю ночь»	2017	Kid Sole	—	—	—	—	—	—	Polaroid
«Кольцо»	2017	Хлеб	—	—	—	—	—	—	«Пушка»
«Ищу себя Enique»	2018	Enique, Souloud	—	—	—	—	—	—	«Чёрное и белое»
«Режим хард»	2018	DJ Nik One	—	—	—	—	—	—	«Сториз»
«Первый»	2018	Rocket	—	—	—	—	—	—	Swag Season
«Выход»	2018	Flesh	—	—	—	—	—	—	Audiopunk 3: Architector
«1 2 3»	2018	044 Rose	—	—	—	—	—	—	044 Rose
«Life 2 $hort»	2019	Мезза	—	—	—	—	—	—	Spas Na Krovi
«Fuck Yeah»	2019	Gidra, OG Buda	—	—	—	—	—	—	Double Back
«AFK»	2019	PKHAT, Boulevard Depo	—	—	—	—	173	28	Volk Walk
«Счётная машинка»	2019	Жак Энтони	—	—	—	—	—	—	Jaws 2
«Секси»	2019	OG Buda	—	—	—	—	—	—	«ОПГ Сити»
«Сердце»	2020	Rozhden	—	—	—	—	—	—	«Дорога домой»
«D R.I.P.»	2020	Gidra	—	—	—	—	—	—	2G
«Красная помада»	2021	Kid Sole	—	—	—	—	—	—	Trap & B
«King of Tha Jungle»	2021	Blago White	—	—	—	—	—	—	Krasavchik
«FREE Melly»	2021	Soda Luv	—	—	—	—	—	—	Roomination
«Ниагара»	2021	Hiro, Andro, Marco-9	—	—	—	—	—	—	Moonfantom
«FREE Melly»	2021	Soda Luv	—	—	—	—	—	—	Roomination: Reloaded
«Шоплифтер»	2022	163Onmyneck, Fearmuch, Scally Milano	—	—	—	—	—	—	No Offence
«Выдох»	2022	OG Buda, 163Onmyneck	—	—	—	—	—	—	Freerio 2
«Фиеста»	2022	Aarne, Seemee	7	5	6	5	—	—	AA Language
