= Big Baby Tape =

Russian rapper (born 2000)

Big Baby Tape Егор Олегович Ракитин
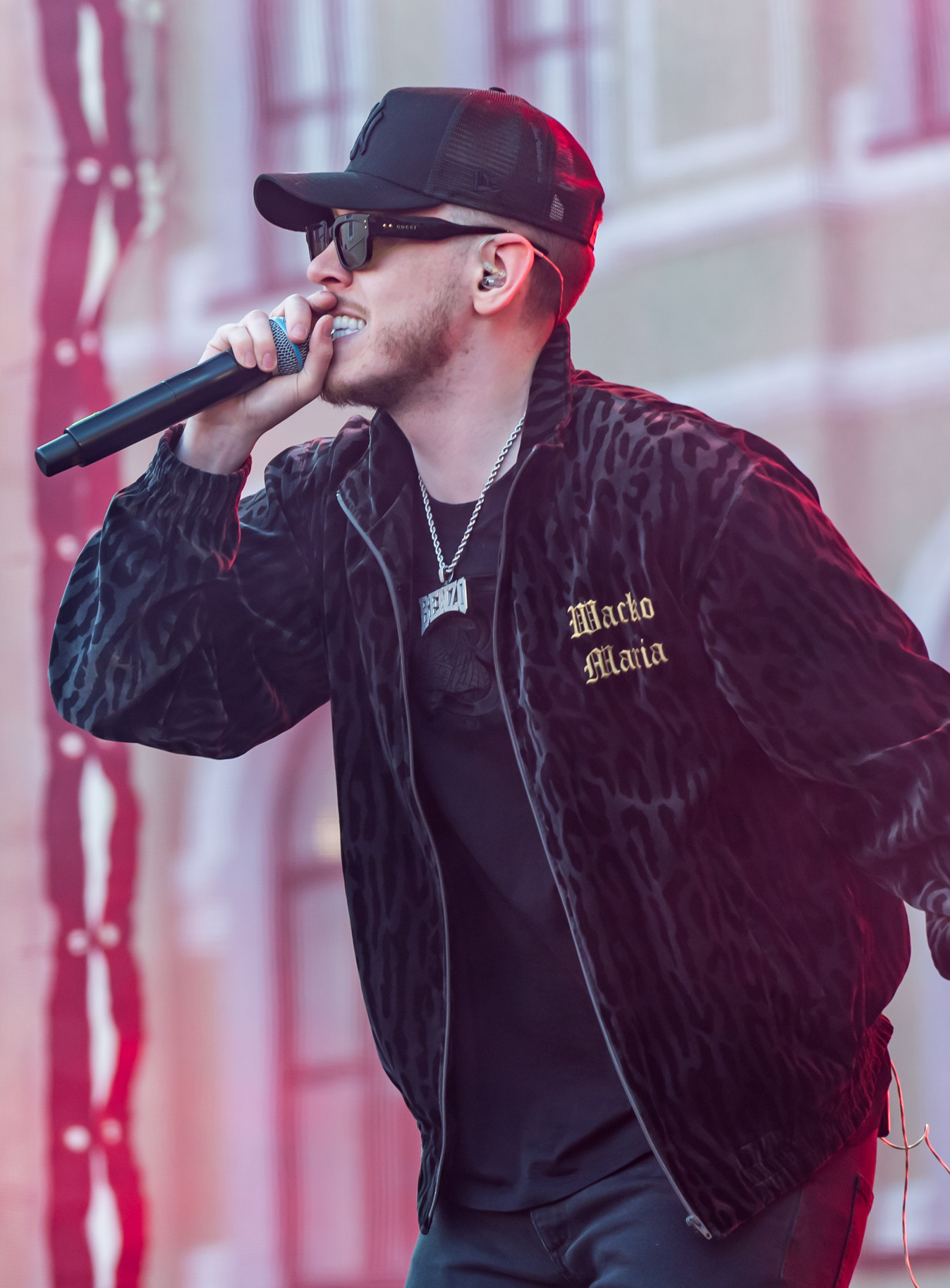
- Big Baby Tape in Saint Petersburg, 2023

Background information
- Also known as: Биг Бейби Тейп; DJ Tape; DJ Tape 2000; Tape LaFlare; Akidra
- Born: Egor Olegovich Rakitin; January 5, 2000 (age 26); Moscow, Russia
- Genres: Hip hop; trap
- Occupations: Rapper; songwriter; record producer
- Years active: 2013-present

Egor Olegovich Rakitin (Russian: Егор Олегович Раки́тин; born 5 January 2000), known professionally as Big Baby Tape, is a Russian rapper, songwriter, and record producer. He is the unofficial leader of the group Benzo Gang. He also performs under the pseudonym DJ Tape ("Ди́джей Тейп") and alter ego Tape LaFlare ("Тейп Лафлэ́р"). He is also a singer signed with the label Warner Music Russia.

== Biography and musical career ==
=== Early period: youth and start of music career ===
Rakitin was born on 5 January 2000. He has twin brothers, who are two years younger than him. Egor was familiar with rap since he was 4 years old, when he first listened to songs by 50 Cent, which impressed the future musician. Later on, he got familiar with the songs of Gucci Mane, which influenced Rakitin's current work. At the age of 6 years old, his aunt asked him: "What do you want to be when you're older?" Egor responded: "A rapper!". At 12 years old he started learning how to play music with Fruity Loops, where Egor met friends of his sister. At first, he was pressing random buttons, not understanding, how they work, and soon threw it away. A year later Egor returned to work in the program and didn't stop making beats (hip-hop instrumentals), Not taking breaks of more than one day for several years. Notable beatmakers for him at different times were Madlib, DJ Zinc, DJ Rashad, DJ Smokey & DJ Paul. At the age of 15 Егор took the stage name DJ Tape and planned to release the instrumental music album DJ Tape 2000, but the release did not come since Egor couldn't instill the quality as he had hoped. After this he decided to rap under the pseudonym Big Baby Tape.

=== 2017—2018: Hoodrich Tales — Dragonborn ===
In May 2017, Big Baby Tape released his first four-track mixtape Cookin' Anthems. At the end of 2017, the rapper met Feduk, seeing that he was listing to his song on his Instagram stories. In an interview on the show "вДудь", Feduk said that Big Baby Tape was in his top-2 for his favorite rappers, and Big Baby Tape got his first wide publicity. Subsequently, Egor began giving instrumentals to his colleagues.

Besides Feduk, in 2018, Egor caught the attention of major artists, like Kizaru, Boulevard Depo, Face & Pharaoh. On 8 March 2018 Egor released a single with Feduk titled "Hustle Tales". On 1 June 2018, he released his debut mini-album Hoodrich Tales with guest singers Polyana (MellowBite), Alizade, Boulevard Depo, Feduk & Egor's alter ego Tape LaFlare. Hip-hop portal The Flow placed the album at number 37 of the «50 domestic albums of 2018».

On 16 November 2018, he released his debut studio album Dragonborn through the label Warner Music Russia. Guests on the album include Boulevard Depo, Husky, Jeembo, i61, White Punk, and others. A couple of days later, after the release of the album track «Gimme the Loot», Big Baby Tape earned his first spot on the charts of Apple Music, iTunes Store, «ВКонтакте», replacing albums by Feduk & Eldzhey, and topping songs like «Sicko Mode» by Travis Scott & «Thank U, Next» by Ariana Grande on the site Genius.

=== 2019—2021: breakup of Benzo Gang, "ARGUMENTS & FACTS" ===
On 10 May 2019, Egor released another mini-album titled Arguments & Facts.

=== 2021 —present: collaboration with Kizaru, "BANDANA I" ===
From December 2021 — January 2022, Big Baby Tape presented some snippets of the album Bandana I. The album was supposed to be released in February. On 23 November 2021 in Moscow he presented the album BANDANA I. In an interview before the concert, Egor said that kizaru could not go to Russia due to his "wanted" status. It was then decided Kizaru would appear as a holographic. The album was released on 22 October 2021.

On 5 April 2023, on his official VK page, there was an excerpt of a track that was planned for his 2023 album "VARSKVA". The reaction by the audience was rather strong. Some users noted a connection in the form of a sample of a song by Yann Tiersen — J'y suis jamais allé (I've Never Been There) and quite popular meme on Runet — the video "Дисс на Дёрти Монка" by Stimyl.

== Music style ==
A great amount of influence that inspired Big Baby Tape was due to musicians Gucci Mane & MF Doom. He also draws creativity from American underground rappers KirbLaGoop, CHXPO, Goth Money Records & others. He also mixes American street slang with Russian and captures the authentic sound of trap music. According to the artist, he learned English from video games and songs. He played Grand Theft Auto: San Andreas and The Elder Scrolls V: Skyrim and translated tracks by Eminem & 50 Cent into Russian.

== Discography ==
=== Studio albums ===
| Year | Title |
|---|---|
| 2018 | Dragonborn |
| 2021 | Bandana I (with Kizaru) |
| 2023 | Varskva |
| 2024 | Peekaboo (with Aarne) |
| TBA | Bandana II (with Kizaru) |
| TBA | LaFlare |

=== EP ===
| Year | Title |
|---|---|
| 2018 | Hoodrich Tales |
| 2019 | Arguments & Facts |

=== Mixtapes ===
| Year | Title |
|---|---|
| 2016 | The Further Adventures Inside The Trap |
| 2017 | Cookin' Anthem |

=== Singles ===
==== As the lead singer with others ====
| Year | Title |
|---|---|
| 2017 | «Trailer Traphouse» |
| 2017 | «One Love» |
| 2017 | «Take A Lick 2017 FREESTYLE» |
| 2017 | «Trap Medals» (featuring Tape LaFlare & Alizade) |
| 2017 | «Dave Chappelle» |
| 2017 | «GUF (Tribute)» (featuring Tape LaFlare) |
| 2017 | «Neighborhood Hoe FREESTYLE» |
| 2017 | «Go Go Tape» |
| 2017 | «Big Dope» (featuring KirbLaGoop) |
| 2017 | «Wasabi» |
| 2017 | «Gelato» |
| 2017 | «Home Alone» |
| 2018 | «Flip Phone Twerk» |
| 2018 | «Hustle Tales» (featuring Feduk) |
| 2018 | «Point Em Out Freestyle» |
| 2018 | «Gimme the Loot» |
| 2019 | «Trap Luv» |
| 2020 | «Errday» |
| 2020 | «Balance» |
| 2020 | «Kari» |
| 2021 | «Влюбилась» (featuring Molodoj Platon) |
| 2022 | «Vlaga» (with Arut) |
| 2022 | «Мой белый» (with Young Moscow) |
| 2023 | «Hoodak MP3» (with Aarne) |
| 2024 | «Turbo (Majestic)» |

==== With other singers ====
| Year | Single |
|---|---|
| 2018 | «Twist It» (OG Prince featuring Big Baby Tape and Tveth) |
| 2019 | «Gucci» (Alizade featuring Big Baby Tape) |
| 2021 | «Stick Out» (Kizaru featuring Big Baby Tape) |

=== Guest singer on other albums ===
| Year | Title | Singer | Album |
|---|---|---|---|
| 2018 | «Люди дрессируют людей» | Boulevard Depo | RAPP2 |
| 2018 | «Outro», «Twist It» | OG Prince | The Decox |
| 2018 | «Шипучка» | Pharaoh | Phuneral |
| 2018 | «Pretty Boy Trap» | Loco OG Rocka | Touchdown, Vol. 1 |
| 2019 | «SOGAS» | Lovesomemama | Motherlode |
| 2019 | «War Or Powder Remix» | Undercodeine | United States of Trapp |
| 2019 | «7 дней» | Lil Krystalll | No Label |
| 2019 | «Легенды Зельды» | OG Buda | «ОПГ Сити» |
| 2021 | «KATER» | Молодой Платон | Son of Trap |
| 2021 | «В поле» | The Limba | Anima |
| 2021 | «Веном» | Платина | Sosa Muzik |
| 2021 | «Берегись» | Словетский | Antishlyagger V |
| 2022 | «КЭН» | OG Buda | Freerio 2 |
| 2022 | «Ski Ski» | Aarne | AA Language |

== Concert Tours ==
| Year | Title |
|---|---|
| 2018 | Dragonborn Tour |
| 2019 | Dragonborn Tour II |
| 2019 | Europe Tour |
| 2020 | Baby On Board (postponed/canceled because of the COVID-19 pandemic) |

== Ratings ==
| Year | Platform | Rating | Place | Ref. |
|---|---|---|---|---|
| 2019 | New York Times | Platinum Russia's Rap Album of 2019 | 1 | |
| 2021 | Spotify | Top-5 Russian singers | 5 | |
| 2024 | МТС | Most Listened Albums of Summer 2024 | 1 | |
