= Bla Bla Land =

EP by Yanix and Thomas Mraz
- Released: September 27, 2017
- Genre: Hip-hop
- Length: 21:27
- Language: Russian
- Label: Booking Machine

Bla Bla Land is an EP by Russian rappers Yanix & Thomas Mraz, released on 27 September 2017. The EP includes a total of 7 tracks, 2 of which were previously released as singles.

== Reception ==
- The hip-hop portal The Flow placed the EP at number 30 on the list of the 50 best Russian albums of 2017.
- According to The Flow readers' vote, the Bla Bla Land EP took fourth place in the Best EP of 2017 category.
- The website "Kanobu" included the track "Хочу к тебе" in its top 50 best songs of 2017 in the "Russian Music" category.

== Track listing ==
No.	Title	Length
1.	"Хочу к тебе"	4:01
2.	"Не сплю"	2:46
3.	"Когда она проходит мимо"	3:33
4.	"Бла Бла Лэнд"	2:49
5.	"Не бери трубку"	3:26
6.	"Большая рыба"	2:43
7.	"Ты ещё со мной здесь"	2:09
Total length:		21:27
