= Mary Gu =

Russian singer (born 1993)

Mary Gu Мэ́ри Гу
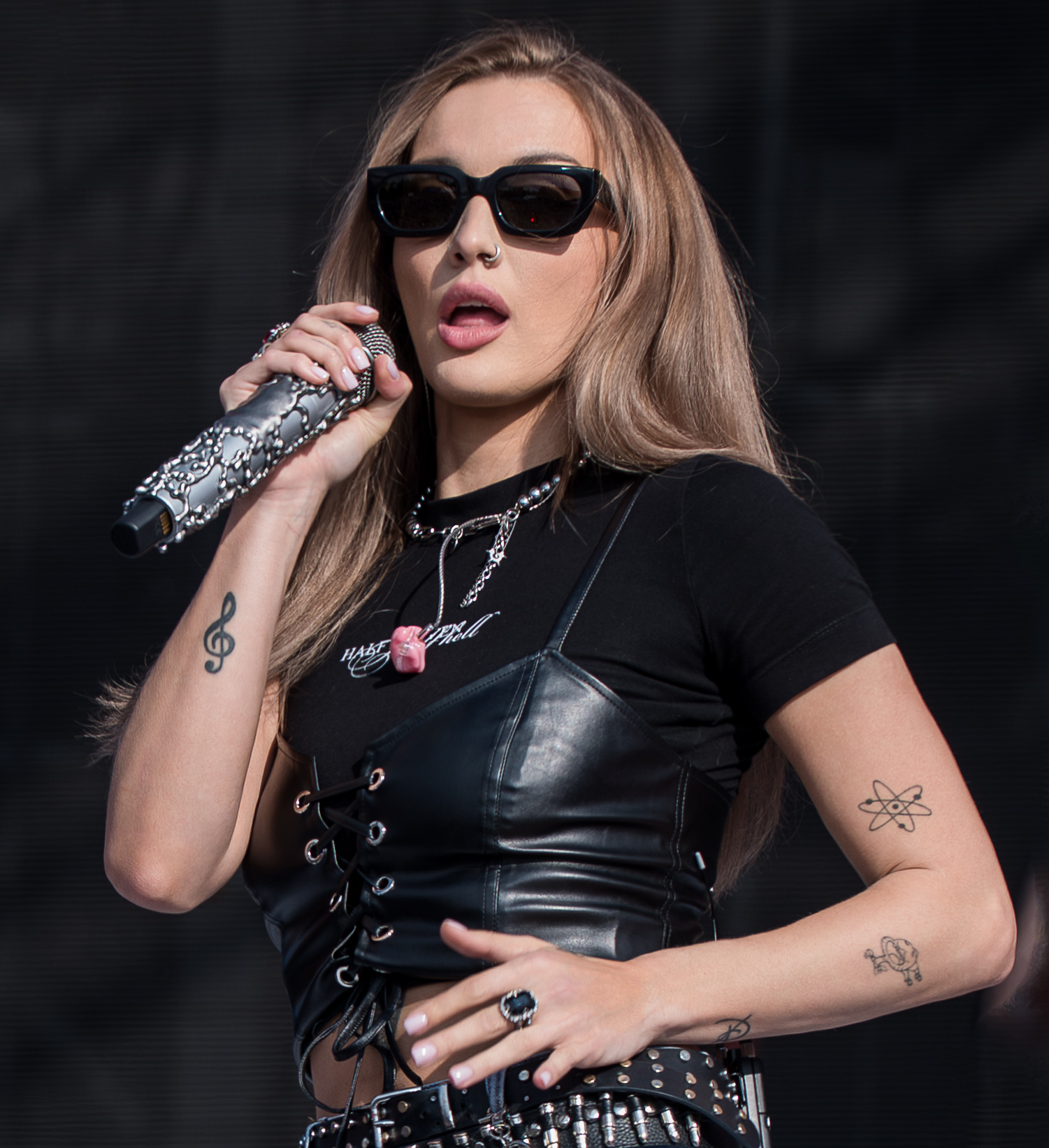

Background information
- Born: Maria Vyacheslavovna Gusarova; August 17, 1993 (age 33); Pokhvistnevo, Samara Oblast, Russia
- Genres: Pop
- Occupations: singer; poet
- Instrument: Piano
- Years active: 2018-present
- Label: Warner Music Russia

Maria Vyacheslavovna Gusarova (Russian: Мари́я Вячесла́вовна Гуса́рова; after marriage — Bogoyavlenskaya; Russian: Богоявле́нская; born 17 August 1993, Pokhvistnevo, Samara Oblast, Russia), better known under the stage name Mary Gu (Russian: Мэ́ри Гу), is a Russian singer, poet & blogger.

== Biography ==
=== Early years ===
Maria Gusarova was born on 17 August 1993 in Samara Oblast in the city of Pokhvistnevo.

=== Personal life ===
At the start of 2017, she moved to Saint Petersburg.

== Discography ==
"Дисней"
Review scores
Source	Rating
InterMedia	7/10 stars

=== Studio albums ===
Title
Details
References
Дисней
- Release: 12 March 2020
- Label: Warner Music Russia
- Format: digital distribution

Track-List
No.	Title	Length
1.	"Девочка из ниоткуда"	2:43
2.	"Ненавижу города"	2:23
3.	"Дисней"	2:55
4.	"Не любила" (feat. Драгни)	3:29
5.	"Вино виновато"	2:43
6.	"Обниматься"	2:42
7.	"Белая ворона" (feat. Loc-Dog)	3:09
8.	"Маленький принц"	3:34
9.	"Она весна"	3:36
10.	"Fuck You" (Bonus Track)	1:36
Total length:		26:50

luvcore
- Release: 16 February 2024
- Label: S&P Digital
- Format: digital distributiondigital distribution

Track-List
No.	Title	Length
1.	"что такое любовь?" (Intro)	0:59
2.	"это тоже пройдёт"	2:48
3.	"dead inside"	2:18
4.	"целуешь её"	1:55
5.	"радио"	2:43
6.	"толстовка" (with OG Buda)	2:17
7.	"мандаринки"	1:50
8.	"наизусть"	2:28
9.	"снег"	2:24
10.	"засыпай" (with Ramil')	2:37
Total length:		19:79

=== EPs ===
Title	Details	References
Грустный мотив — EP	Release: 17 September 2018; Label: Klever Label; Format: digital distribution	Track List: No. / Title / Length; 1. / "Грустный мотив" / 2:20; 2. / "Дикая" / 3:26; 3. / "Я мелодия" / 2:47; 4. / "Здравствуй" / 2:15; Total length: / / 10:08
Хорошее и плохое — EP	Release: 1 April 2021; Label: Warner Music Russia; Format: digital distribution	Track-List: No. / Title / Length; 1. / "Косички" / 2:29; 2. / "Вечеринки" / 3:06; 3. / "Не влюбляйся" / 2:54; 4. / "Она читает Бродского" / 2:03; 5. / "Виселица" / 2:38; Total length: / / 12:30
Плохое и хорошее — EP	Release: 23 April 2021; Label: Warner Music Russia; Format: digital distribution	Track-List: No. / Title / Length; 1. / "Bad Trip" / 2:02; 2. / "Небо" / 2:13; 3. / "+1" / 2:23; 4. / "Подруга" / 2:34; 5. / "Письмо" / 2:16; Total length: / / 10:88

=== Singles ===
Year	Title	References
2018	"Ай-Петри" (with Драгни)	Digital single, rel. 26 Sep. 2018
2018	"Я не прощаю"	Digital single, rel. 11 Dec. 2018
2019	"Папа"	Digital single, rel. 18 Feb. 2019
2019	"Магнолия"	Digital single, rel. 21 May 2019
2019	"17"	Digital single, rel. 13 Jun. 2019
2019	"Свежие раны" (with Asammuell)	Digital single, rel. 14 Aug. 2019
2019	"Ты моя слабость"	Digital single, rel. 6 Sep. 2019
2019	"Грустный Новый год"	Digital single, rel. 11 Dec. 2019
2020	«Пьяный романтик»	Digital single, rel. 5 Jun. 2020
2020	"Нежность"	Digital single, rel. 7 Aug. 2020. Remix of the song "Нежность" by singer MakSim.
2020	"Астероид"	Digital single, rel. 25 Sep. 2020
2020	"Не влюбляйся"	Digital single, rel. 20 Nov. 2020
2021	"Косички"	Digital single, rel. 5 Mar. 2021
2021	"Я в моменте 2" (with Dzharakhov)	Digital single, rel. 5 Aug. 2021
2021	"Кислород"	Digital single, rel. 9 Sep. 2021
2021	"Холодно не будет" (with Mot)	Digital single, rel. 3 Dec. 2021
2022	"Если в сердце живёт любовь (Из "Моя любимая Страшко")"	Digital single, rel. 3 Feb. 2022. Cover of song by singer Yulia Savicheva.
2022	"Не перегори"	Digital single, rel. 18 Mar. 2022
2022	"Спасибо" (with Dose)	Digital single, rel. 10 Jun. 2022
2022	"Невеста"	Digital single, rel. 1 Jul. 2022
2022	"Калифорния"	Digital single, rel. 30 Sep. 2022
2022	"Два выстрела" (with Mayot)	Digital single, rel. 18 Nov. 2022
2023	"Грустно и точка"	Digital single, rel. 24 Feb. 2023
2023	"Я тебя тоже" (with Wildways)	Digital single, rel. 16 Jun. 2023
2023	"Обожай"	Digital single, rel. 21 Jul. 2023
2023	"Снег (Iuvcore intro)"	Digital single, rel. 22 Sep. 2023
2023	"Засыпай" (with Ramil)	Digital single, rel. 16 Nov. 2023
2024	"Толстовка" (with OG Buda)	Digital single, вып. 2 Feb. 2024

== Awards and nominations ==
Year	Award	Nomination	Results	Ref.
2020	Премия OK	New faces. Music	Nominated	
