= Soda Luv =

Russian rapper (born 1997)

- Also known as: Soda Luv, Plea$ant_Freak, PVRPL\GENEZI$
- Born: Vladislav Ruslanovich Terentyuk (Владислав Русланович Терентюк); July 28, 1997 (age 29); Ukhta, Komi Republic, Russia
- Occupations: Singer; songwriter; rapper
- Years active: 2016-present

Vladislav Ruslanovich Terentyuk (Russian: Владисла́в Русла́нович Терентю́к; born 28 July 1997[1], Ukhta, Komi Republic [1]), better known as Soda Luv, is a Russian hip-hop singer, songwriter & rapper. He gained wide popularity in 2021 after he released several popular tracks, landing in charts of streaming services in Russia & Ukraine.

== Early years ==
After school Vladislav moved to Saint Petersburg, where he started selling narcotics, and also working as a dishwasher and clothes salesman. From 2017 to 2019, he worked as a webcam model.

== Musical career ==
In June 2021, five tracks, written featuring Soda Luv, entered the Russian & Ukrainian Spotify charts as the most streamed in a week. In the magazine GQ, Soda Luv was nominated for «Men of the Year 2021» in the category «Discovery of the year» with the wording «For top album Viva la Vida».

== Discography ==
=== Studio albums ===
Year	Title	Details
2016	«Re:Flexxxia»	Album not available on streaming platforms
2017	«Ой, прости, не тебе»	Album not available on streaming platforms
2017	«Как? Так!»	Album not available on streaming platforms
2019	«Ничего личного»	—
2020	«Viva La Vida»	—
2021	«Roomination»	—
2022	«Native Strangers»	—
2022	«Ничего личного 2»	—

=== Mini-albums ===
Year	Name
2018	«Превосходный синий»
2019	«Тупо мясо» (with со StereoRYZE)
2021	«Коть! Коть!»

==== With others as the lead artist ====
Year	Title
2019	«Супа дупа скэнк»
2019	«Содадайлув»
2019	«Ду ю ду»
2019	«Данко»
2019	«Блэсс гад»
2019	«Галоперидол»
2019	«Содадайлув»
2020	«Ognocap»
2020	«Рататуй» (with Seemee)
2020	«Дрипики» (with Mayot)
2020	«Запятые» (with FrozenGangBeatz & Rvmzes)
2020	«Хотбокс»
2020	«Бищ! Где трэп?!»
2021	«КаZантип» (featuring Blago White)
2021	«Казантип (Remix)» (featuring Sqwoz Bab)
2021	«Трап дом» (featuring Thrill Pill)
2021	«Cristal &amp; Моёт (Remix)» (featuring Morgenshtern, Blago White, OG Buda & Mayot)
2021	«Голодный пес (Remix)» (with Seemee & Kashin)
2021	«Чатик»
2021	«Прости»
2021	«Дым»
2021	«Кто сказал?» (with Rakhim & Slava Marlow)
2022	«Жорики»
2022	«Badass» (with Yanix)
2022	«Maybach»
2022	«DTF»

=== As guest singer ===
Year	Singer	Album	Song
2019	Sawyer Ford	Non-album single	«BAD!»
2019	Nahal	Non-album single	«Верхом»
2019	Куок & Why Berry	Decadance 3	«Будка»
2020	Seemee	2G	«Голодный пёс»
2020	Loco Og Rocka	Touchdown, Vol. 2	«Cod»
2020	Thrill Pill	Birthday Mix 2020	«M&M's»
2021	Lovv66	Puzzles	«На моих пальцах»
2021	OG Buda & Egor Kreed	FREERIO	«Сайфер»
2021	OG Buda	FREERIO	«Бонус трек (Гряссь)»
2021	OG Buda	«hu3ta»	
2021	Egor Kreed	Pussy Boy	«Грустно»
Bushido Zho	No Bang! Hold On!	«Не пара»	
2022	Pizdetboy & DaddyFour	Non-album single	«Dummy»
2022	OG Buda	FREERIO 2	«Спали»
2022	Klava Koka	Non-album single	«Думал»
2022	Pinq	K.O.	«Ночь»
2022	Thomas Mraz	Алукард	«Мув»
