= Dragonborn (album) =

Studio album by Big Baby Tape
- Released: November 16, 2018
- Genre: Trap
- Length: 60:34
- Language: Russian
- Label: Warner Music Russia

Dragonborn (Russian: «Драконорождённый») is the debut album by Russian singer and producer Big Baby Tape, released on 16 November 2018 through the label Warner Music Russia. It was co-produced with Husky, Boulevard Depo, i61, Jeembo, White Punk and others. Hip-hop portal The Flow placed the album 13th on the list "50 Best Albums of 2018."

== Background ==
After releasing the EP Hoodrich Tales, Big Baby Tape announced that he was working on a new musical project, later calling it Dragonborn.

The album was released on 16 November 2018. The recording also featured Boulevard Depo, Husky, Jeembo, i61, White Punk and others.
