= The Limba =

Kazakhstani singer (born 1996)

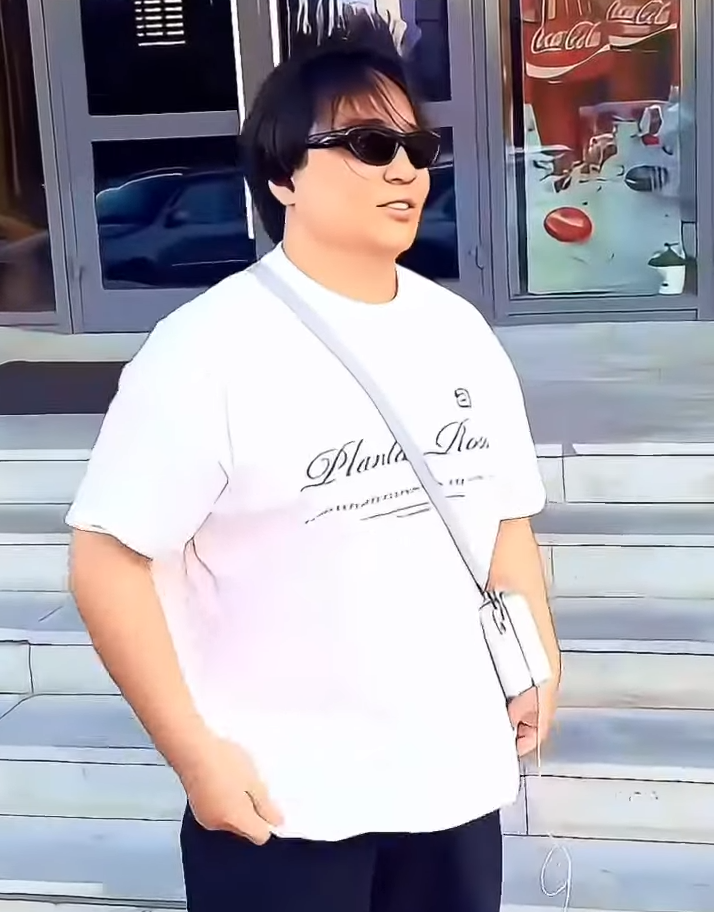
- The Limba's latest photo

Background information
- Born: Mukhametali Radikovich Akhmetzhanov; 13 December 1997 (age 28); Almaty, Kazakhstan
- Origin: Almaty, Kazakhstan
- Occupation: Musical artist
- Labels: Студия Союз; Ozen; Atlantic Records Russia

Mukhametali Radikovich Akhmetzhanov (Kazakh: Мұхаммедәлі Радикұлы Ахметжанов, romanized: Mūhammedälı Radikūly Ahmetjanov; born 13 December 1997), better known as The Limba, is a Kazakh musician and singer. He is an ethnic Uyghur.

== Career ==
On 26 October 2018, The Limba released his first studio album «Мы едем домой...», which has eight songs.

On 22 August 2019, The Limba released his second album «Я дома». The album has eight tracks, each of which describes breaking up in relationships.

On 13 December 2019, The Limba released a mini album called «Сакура».

On 6 March 2020, The Limba released the single «Таблетка», produced by Scriptonite.

On 21 May 2020 The Limba released the single «X.O» with Andro. The music video of the song was released on 9 July of that year, which was watched 20 million times and became The Limba's biggest hit at the time.

On 4 September 2020 The Limba released the song «Coco L'Eau» with Egor Kreed, done in the same style as «X.O» and has references to it. The song also had a music video, shot in the studio where the track was made. The Limba initiated the collaboration, аnd Egor Kreed made the instrumental for the song. The song was made in one day.

On 23 July 2021 The Limba released his third studio album «Anima». The album has 14 songs. It was produced by Atlantic Records Russia.

== Soccer ==
Mukhametali Akhmetzhanov
Personal information
- Full name: Mukhametali Radikovich Akhmetzhanov
- Date of birth: 13 December 1997 (age 28)
- Place of birth: Almaty, Kazakhstan
- Position: Forward

Team information
- Current team: FC Amkal Moscow

Senior career*
| Years | Team | Apps | (Gls) |
| 2025– | FC Amkal Moscow | | |
- * Club domestic league appearances and goals as of 6 August 2025

On August 5, 2025, Akhmetzhanov played his first official professional football match, coming out in the starting lineup for the FC Amkal Moscow in the match against Kvant in the 1/256 finals of the 2025–26 Russian Cup.

== Discography ==
=== Studio albums ===
List of albums with details
| Name | Details |
|---|---|
| «Мы едем домой...» | Released: 26 October 2018; Label: Студия «Союз»; Format: Digital distribution |
| «Я дома.» | Released: 22 August 2019; Label: õzen; Format: Digital distribution |
| «Anima» | Released: 23 July 2021; Label: Atlantic Records; Format: Digital distribution |
| «Celine» | Released: 31 March 2023; Label: Самиздат; Format: Digital distribution |

=== Mini albums ===
List of mini albums with details
| Name | Details |
|---|---|
| Reflex | Released: 3 August 2017; Label: Студия «Союз»; Format: Digital distribution |
| «Пойдём со мной?» | Released: 24 January 2018; Label: Студия «Союз»; Format: Digital distribution |
| «Сакура» | Released: 13 December 2019; Label: Студия «Союз»; Format: Digital distribution |

=== Singles ===
==== As lead artist ====
| Name | Year | Highest position on charts | | |
| Name | Year | Top Radio & YouTube Hits | Top Radio Hits | Top YouTube Hits |
|---|---|---|---|---|
| «Всё просто» | 2018 | — | — | — |
| «Пустыня» | 2018 | — | — | — |
| «Обманула» | 2018 | — | — | — |
| «Подруга» (feat. AlvinToday) | 2018 | — | — | — |
| «Софиты» | 2018 | — | — | — |
| «Это не девушка, это беда» (feat. Mufaddal) | 2018 | — | — | — |
| «Фаворит» (with qobee) | 2018 | — | — | — |
| «Не найду» (with Deke) | 2019 | — | — | — |
| «Наивная» (with M'Dee and abdr.) | 2019 | — | — | — |
| «Enigma» | 2019 | — | — | — |
| «Классно» (with Dilnaz Akhmadieva) | 2019 | — | — | — |
| «Не найду» (with Fatbelly) | 2019 | — | — | — |
| «Не дам» (with Yanke and Lumma) | 2019 | 157 | 847 | — |
| «Refresh» (with Darrem and Tolebi featuring QONTRAST, M'Dee, abdr., Smock SB and Bonapart) | 2019 | — | — | — |
| «Таблетка» | 2020 | — | — | — |
| «X.O» (with Andro) | 2020 | 33 | 218 | 7 |
| «Не одна» | 2020 | — | — | — |
| «Coco L'Eau» (with Egor Kreed) | 2020 | — | — | — |
| «Дай мне ответ» | 2020 | — | — | — |
| «Noir» (with Aarne and Markul) | 2021 | — | — | — |
| «Ронин» (with Scriptonite) | 2021 | — | — | — |
| «Инсайд» | 2021 | — | — | — |
| «Хентай (версия для Джигана)» (with Rakhim) | 2021 | — | — | — |
| «Она тебя любит» (with Slava Marlow and Eldzhey) | 2021 | — | — | — |
| «Босс» (with Jony) | 2021 | — | — | — |
| «Секрет» | 2022 | — | — | — |
| «Известным» (with Мorgenshtern) | 2022 | — | — | — |
| «Kiki» | 2022 | — | — | — |
| «Сколько стоит любовь» (with Morgenshtern, Niletto andBoombl4) | 2022 | — | — | — |
| «Секрет (Remix)» (with Edmofo) | 2022 | — | — | — |
| «Не больно» | 2022 | — | — | — |
| «Proof» (with Arut) | 2022 | — | — | — |
| «Новогодняя песня» (with Jony, Egor Kreed & Vladislav Bumaga ) | 2022 | — | — | — |
| «Ты и Я» (with Konfuz) | 2023 | — | — | — |

==== As featuring artist ====
| Name | Year | Album |
|---|---|---|
| «Вижу, но не слышу» (Tanir with The Limba) | 2018 | Non-album single |
| «Мяу-мяу» (AlvinToday with The Limba) | 2019 | Non-album single |
| «Модно» (Tolebi with The Limba) | 2019 | Non-album single |
| «Рассвет» (Loren with The Limba) | 2019 | Non-album single |
| «Коктейль» (Qontrast with The Limba & HIRO) | 2019 | Коктейль |
| «По пятам» (Loren with The Limba) | 2020 | Non-album single |
| «Чибо» (Lovanda with The Limba) | 2021 | Тепло |
| «Fall In Lova» (Молодой Платон with The Limba) | 2021 | Son of Trap |
| «На чиле» (With GeeGun, Egor Kreed, The Limba, Blago White, OG Buda, Timati, Soda Luv & Guf) | 2021 | Non-album single |
| «Yummy» (Andro with The Limba) | 2021 | Jani Gipsy |
| «Bestie» (Morgenshtern with The Limba) | 2022 | Last One |
| «Морось» (Soda Luv with The Limba) | 2023 | Ничего личного 2 (Deluxe) |

== Videography ==
| Name | Year |
|---|---|
| «Обманула» | 2018 |
| «Enigma» | 2019 |
| «Синие фиалки» | 2019 |
| «Скандал» | 2019 |
| «Яд» | 2019 |
| «X.O» (with Andro) | 2020 |
| «Coco L'Eau» (with Еgor Kreed) | 2020 |
| «Дай мне ответ» | 2020 |
| «На чиле» (with GeeGun, Egor Kreed, blago white, OG Buda, Timati, Soda Luv & Guf) | 2021 |
| «Босс» (with Jony) | 2021 |
| «Новогодняя песня» (with Jony, Egor Kreed & Владом А4) | 2022 |
