= Feduk =

Russian rapper (born 1992)

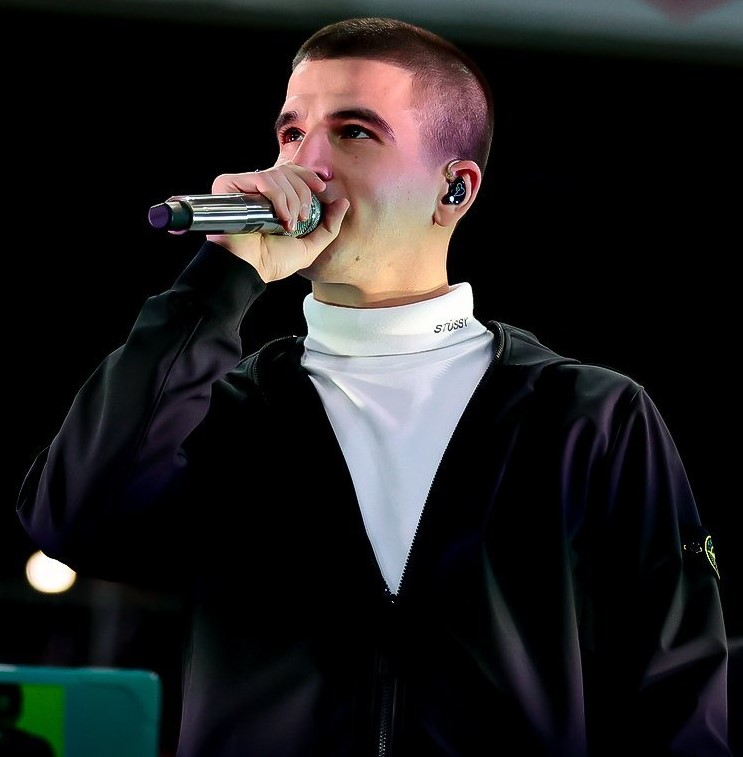
- Feduk in 2022

Background information
- Born: Fyodor Andreevich Insarov; February 9, 1992 (age 34); Moscow, Russia
- Occupation: Rapper
- Instruments: Guitar, Piano
- Years active: 2010-present
- Label: Warner Music Russia

Fyodor Andreevich Insarov (Russian: Фёдор Андреевич Инсаров Федук; born 9 February 1992, Moscow), known professionally as Feduk, is a Russian rapper. His solo career began in 2010, and has since released two mini albums and seven studio albums.

== Biography ==
=== Personal life ===
Feduk met Alexandra Novikova, the daughter of restaurateur Arkady Novikov, and they were married on 22 May 2021 after three years of dating. The couple welcomed a daughter, Nina, on 2 March 2022.

== Career ==
=== 2017: «Розовое вино» (Rosé Wine) ===
All-Russian fame came to the performer in 2017, when the song "Розовое вино", recorded together with rapper Eldzhey, became one of the top Russian-language hits of the year. The video for the song was released on November 14, 2017 and became the cause of a conflict between the performers who did not understand the order of names in the title of the video. Two days after its publication, the clip was blocked on YouTube, having previously gained two million views. A day later, the video was unblocked, but now the first in the list of performers was Eldzhey.

The track "Розовое вино" became the most popular in 2017 according to users of the social network "VKontakte". The song has been listened to over 200 million times in one year.

=== 2018: «Закрывай глаза» (Close Your Eyes) ===
On March 3rd 2023 Feduk sued Eldzhey over their joint track Punks Not Dead, which was allegedly posted without Fedor's permission.

== Discography ==
=== Albums ===
- 2013 — «Сезон пожарче» (with Toobe)
- 2014 — Ghetto Space
- 2015 — «Наш Остров»
- 2016 — «Фри»
- 2017 — F&Q
- 2018 — More Love
- 2020 — «Йай»
- 2022 — «В тон улицам»

=== Mini albums ===
- 2014 — «Нотный стаф»
- 2021 — «Заново»

=== Singles ===
==== 2010s ====
- 2011 — «Былым временам» (feat. No Kanifol')
- 2011 — «БТЛ (Буду Тебя Любить)» (feat. 158)
- 2011 — «One Love / Ван Лав» (feat. Toobe, ЧикаЛика)
- 2013 — «Околофутбола»
- 2013 — «Гуччи Мейн вернулся к маме» (feat. Паша Техник)
- 2015 — «Москва»
- 2016 — «TOUR DE FRANCE» (feat. Msb4x4)
- 2017 — «Мне нужна Москва» (feat. Reptar)
- 2017 — «Турки» (feat. Lil Melon)
- 2017 — «Моряк»
- 2017 — «Rozovoye vino» (Eldzhey feat. Feduk)
- 2017 — «Groove»
- 2018 — «Хлопья летят наверх»
- 2018 — «Hustle Tales» (Feduk feat. Big Baby Tape)
- 2018 — «Закрывай глаза»
- 2018 — «Тусинаруси»
- 2018 — «На лайте» (feat. Tony Tonite)
- 2018 — «Холостяк» (LSP feat. Feduk, Egor Kreed)
- 2018 — «По волнам»
- 2018 — «More Love»
- 2018 — «Амазонка»
- 2018 — «Где справедливость?» (feat. Джигли, Слава КПСС)
- 2019 — «Хорошая акустика» (OG Buda feat. Feduk)
- 2019 — «Ламбо» (Платина feat. Feduk)
- 2019 — «27»
- 2019 — «Море любви»
- 2019 — «Пальмы»
- 2019 — «Мой город»
- 2019 — «Сахарок» (feat. Вандер Фил)
- 2019 — «Их» (feat. Vacio)

==== 2020s ====
- 2020 — «Исповедь» (feat. Mishlawi)
- 2020 — «Останься» (feat. BMB SpaceKid)
- 2020 — «Друзья» (feat. Vacio)
- 2020 — «Краски»
- 2020 — «Бэнгер»
- 2020 — «Маяк»
- 2020 — «Фак опс»
- 2020 — «Покажи мне свою комнату»
- 2020 — «Водолей»
- 2021 — «Мама» (Scriptonite feat. Feduk, Truwer, Niman, Basta)
- 2021 — «Невобломе»
- 2021 — «Песня про лето»
- 2021 — «Я пони» (feat. Cream Soda)
- 2021 — «Просто открой» (feat. Coca-Cola)
- 2021 — «Заново»
- 2022 — «Танцы на кухне»
- 2022 — «Зонт» (feat. Anikv)
- 2022 — «Ты» (feat. Dose)
- 2022 — «Стильный Ай»
- 2022 — «Diss»
- 2022 — «Запрети мне носить аирмаксы» (feat. 158)
- 2022 — «Времени нет» (feat. Basta)
- 2022 — «Жить» (feat. Armich)
- 2022 — «Город несбывшихся надежд»
- 2023 — «Колыбельная»

==== As guest singer ====
- Artur Kreem — «Вся улица наша» («No Chill»)
- Big Baby Tape — «Hustle Tales» («Hoodrich Tales»)
- Кравц — «Скуби-Ду» («Что ещё объяснять?»)
- Рептар — «Мне нужна Москва» («Как было»)
- Платина & OG BUDA — «Биг-Бой» («Сладких снов»)
- Obladaet — «Billy Jean» («Ice Cream»)
- Lil Krystall — «Крутая» («No Label»)
- Платина — «Ламбо» («Опиаты Круг»)
- OG Buda & Платина & Obladaet — «Выше облаков» («Опг сити»)
- OG Buda — «Откровения» («Опг сити»)
- Vacio — «Их» («88»)
- Telly Grave — «Threesha» («Rager»)
- Mayot & Blago White & Seemee & Thrill Pill — «Чипсы» («Ghetto Garden»)
- Mayot — «Море» («Ghetto Garden»)
- Рыночные отношения — «Где же душа?» («2020»)
- SCAUT & ScauT & Riva-ma & Nokanie & Toobe & Zmeysab — «Каждому своё» («Сборник 2007—2020»)
- Скриптонит — «Рамок нет» («Свистки и бумажки»)
- Рыночные отношения — «На брендах» («2021»)
- OG Buda — «Нет, брат» («ОПГ Сити»)
- Aarne (producer) — «Перепонки» («Aa Language»)
- JuL — «Potion» («Coeur Blanc»)
- Yungway & OG Buda — «Тебе» («Excalibur»)
- SALUKI, FRIENDLY THUG 52 NGG — «Boy$»

As a featured artist

- Платина, OG Buda — «Биг бой»
- Lil Krystall — «Крутая»
- Telly Grave — «Threesha»
- T-Fest — «Изменчивый мир»
- Ed Sheeran & Slava Marlow — «Shivers»

== Filmography ==
- 2019 — Толя-робот — Denis Kalanikov (Den), ex-partner of Masha, beatmaker
- 2021 — Семейный бюджет — Plays himself

== Videography ==
- 2013 — «Околофутбола»
- 2014 — «Не одно и то же» (feat. Toobe)
- 2014 — «Улофа Пальме» (feat. Toobe)
- 2015 — «Москва» (feat. Antiosov)
- 2015 — «24 октября»
- 2016 — «Равнина»
- 2016 — «Перебрал»
- 2017 — «На этаже» (feat. FolkPro)
- 2017 — «Культурный агрессор»
- 2017 — «Rozovoye vino» (feat. Eldzhey)
- 2017 — «Розово-малиновое вино» (feat. Игорь Николаев, Иван Ургант, Александр Гудков)
- 2018 — «Моряк»
- 2018 — «Hustle Tales» (feat. Big Baby Tape)
- 2018 — «Луна»
- 2018 — «Хлопья летят наверх»
- 2018 — «Холостяк» (feat. ЛСП, Egor Kreed)
- 2018 — «По волнам»
- 2019 — «Амазонка»
- 2019 — «More Love»
- 2019 — «27»
- 2019 — «Пальмы»
- 2019 — «Billy Jean» (feat. Obladaet)
- 2020 — «Останься»
- 2020 — «Краски»
- 2020 — «Покажи мне свою комнату»
- 2021 — «Водолей»
- 2021 — «Бэнгер»
- 2021 — «Просто открой» (feat. Coca-Cola)
- 2021 — «Заново»
- 2022 — «Танцы на кухне»
- 2022 — «Diss»

Guest in videoclips of other singers:

- Платина & Og Buda — «Это не любовь»
- Кравц — «Руку на ритм»
- Og Buda — «Бандит»
- 2018 — Ты не верь слезам
- 2020 — Минимал
- 2022 — Гибралтар-Лабрадор

== Awards and nominations ==
2018

- He won "RU.TV"'s nomination of «breakthrough of the year».
- He won Fashion People Awards' nomination for «breakthrough of the year».
- Nominated for the «High five» award for the nomination «favorite song» («Розовое вино» feat Eldzhey).

== Guest in Rap Battles ==
=== «Versus Battle» ===
Rival	Release date
Yung Trappa	2014
