= Boulevard Depo =

Russian rapper (born 1991)

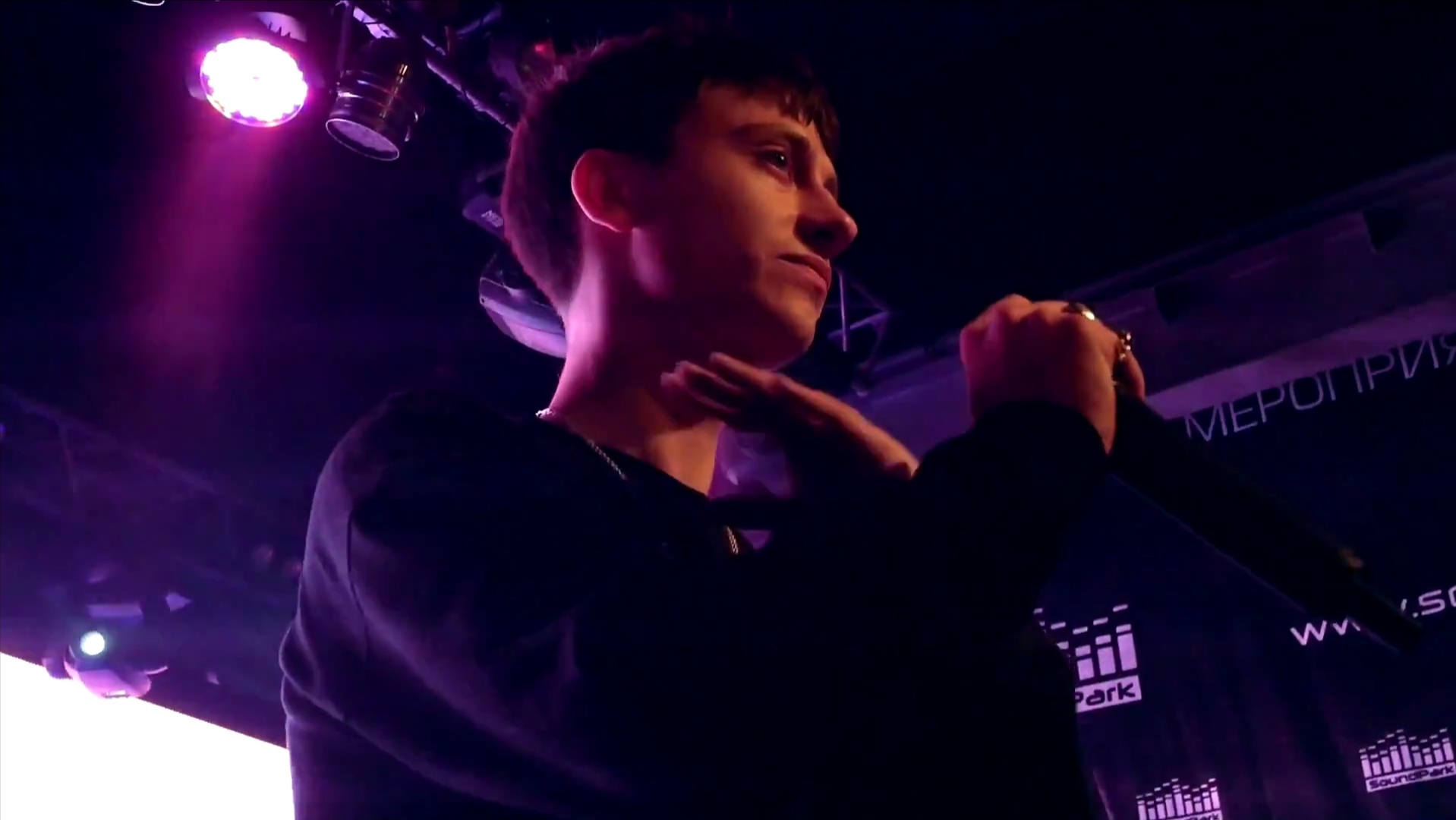

Background information
- Also known as: Boulevard Depo, PowerPuff Luv, Depo Blvrd, Наташа 16, Павел Топский
- Born: Artyom Sergeevich Kulik; Артём Серге́евич Кули́к; June 1, 1991 (age 35); Ufa, Russia
- Genres: Hip hop
- Years active: 2007-present

Boulevard Depo (Russian: Бульва́р Депо́) (real name Artyom Sergeevich Kulik; Russian: Артём Серге́евич Кули́к) (born 1 June 1991, Ufa) is a Russian rapper and songwriter, and a former member and founder of the creative association YungRussia.
