= 163onmyneck =

Russian rapper (born 1996)

- Born: Roman Vadimovich Shurov; Рома́н Вади́мович Щу́ров; August 31, 1996 (age 30); Tyumen, Russia
- Genre: Hip-hop
- Occupation: Rapper
- Years active: 2019-present
- Label: RANDOM CREW
- Member of: Melon Music

163onmyneck (real name Roman Vadimovich Shurov; Russian: Рома́н Вади́мович Щу́ров; born 31 August 1996, Tyumen) is a Russian rapper, who is signed to Melon Music.

== Biography ==
=== Early years ===
He was born on August 31, 1996, in Tyumen. His family constantly moved around different countries: he has lived in France, Italy, China, and the UK. He became interested in music while still in school, and in high school he started doing graffiti, where he met Seemee.

=== Career ===
In 2017, Lil Melon died, in whose honor the guys later organized the association Melon Music. In 2019, Seemee, DooMee and Mayot moved to Moscow and founded the recording studio Melon Music Records. 163onmyneck followed them to work at the studio. On December 25, 2020, he released a mixtape in collaboration with MellowBite titled Ghetto Mellow Melon Bite Christmas. In March 2021, he released his debut EP Grow Guide, in which it achieved 27th place on the charts on Apple Music and 2nd on the BandLink charts.

== Discography ==
=== Studio albums ===
Year	Title	Notes
2022	No Offence	1st place on the charts on Apple Music
2023	Grow Guide 3	—
2024	Ойкумена	With Polyana
2025	Ойкумена 2	With Polyana

=== EPs ===
Year	Title	Notes
2021	Grow Guide	27th place on the charts on Apple Music
