= Loc-Dog =

Russian singer (born 1989)

Loc-Dog Лок Дог
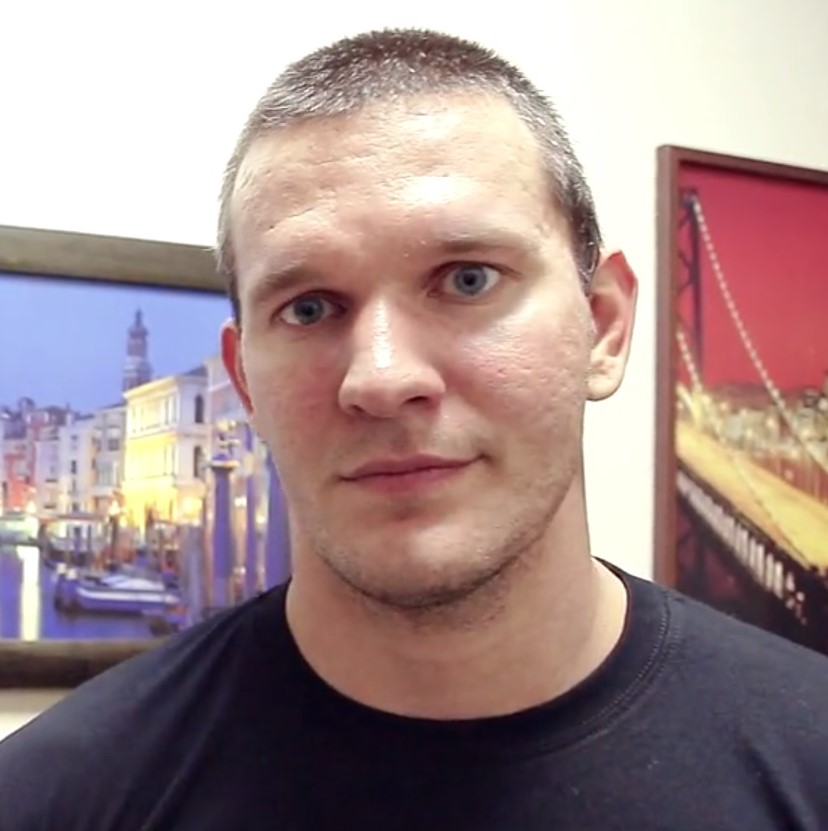

Background information
- Born: Aleksandr Mikhailovich Zhvakin; January 25, 1989 (age 37); Ulyanovsk, USSR
- Genres: hip hop; electropop; hip house
- Occupations: rap-singer; hip-hop singer; songwriter
- Years active: 2006-present
- Labels: X-Limit (2009–2012), Roof Records (2013 – present)

Aleksandr Mikhailovich Zhvakin (Russian: Алекса́ндр Миха́йлович Жва́кин; born 25 January 1989, Ulyanovsk), better known under the stage name Loc-Dog (Russian: Лок Дог), is a Russian rap and hip-hop singer, lyricist, & songwriter. He is a former member of the group "Стороны Ра". He became the first Russian-speaking musician to perform electrorap (combining rap & electro music) & hip-house. To date, he has released nine albums: "Паранойя", "Всем до свидания", "Апокалипсис 2012", "Прилетел", Electrodog 2, "Дисконнект", "Себе не ври", "Крылья", "Шумный город", & "Счастье в простом".

== Life and career ==
In 2010, he served as an opening act for American rapper 50 Cent.

In August 2014, the performer stated that the "Loc-Dog" project was temporarily frozen. Sometime later, in September, the album "Себе не ври" was released, which put an end to the existence of the "Loc-Dog" project.

In September 2016, he brought back the "Loc-Dog" nickname and returned to making music, releasing the album "Крылья" and returning to touring cities.

In November 2016, he won the Golden Grammophone for the song "На Расстоянии".

== Videography ==
Year	Title	Director(s)	Album
2009	"Паранойя"	No information	Паранойя
2010	"До небес"	Georgiy Korolyov	Паранойя
2010	"Город грехов"	Georgiy Korolyov	Singles
2010	"Сгораю" (feat. Fameclub)	Georgiy Korolyov	Singles
2011	"Снова"	Georgiy Korolyov	Апокалипсис 2012
2011	"Зачинщик беспредела"	Georgiy Korolyov	Апокалипсис 2012
2011	"Время три утра"	TheStudio46	Паранойя
2011	"Фраза силы"	Ilya Ivanov	Single
2012	"Могло бы быть иначе" (feat. Dr. Up, 4atty)	Andrei Lisanov	Прилетел
2012	"Питер, Питер" (feat. Tony VA)	Andrei Strugovetz	Прилетел
2012	"Слюни" (Live)	Vlad Zizdok	Singles
2013	"Спасибо"	Aleksandra Dyabdenko	Singles
2013	"Все знают всё" (feat. Tony VA)	Zakhar Bazarov	#ВсеЗнаютВсё
2013	"Деньги не ведут в Рай" (feat. Palevo)	Great Stuff	Single
2013	"На траве сырой"	Vlad Zizdok	Electrodog 2
2013	"Светофора" (feat. Dr. Up, 4atty)	Andrei Lisanov	Singles
2013	"2-CB"	Vlad Zizdok	Singles
2013	"Мы живы"	Vlad Zizdok	Singles
2013	"Счастье Project"	Georgiy Korolyov	Electrodog 2
2014	"Повседневка" feat. Артём Татищевский, 4sgm)	Alexey Tarasov	Singles
2014	"Не до абстракций"	Aleksandr Makov	Singles
2014	"Медленно падал снег" (feat. Андрей Ковалёв)	Mikhail Roitman	Singles
2016	"Серьёзным" (live)	Vlad Zizdok	Singles
2017	Смейся	No information	Крылья
2017	Мимо нот	No information	Крылья
2018	"Громче" (live)	Vlad Zizdok	Singles
2018	"До солнца" (feat. Ёлки)	Medet Shayakhmetov	Singles
2019	"Мне уже пора"	David Bintsene	Шумный город
2019	"Мне уже пора" (Piano Version)	Semyon Bagirov	Singles
2019	"Белая Ворона" (feat. Mary Gu)	No information	Singles
2020	"Киты"	Semyon Bagirov	Singles
2020	"Громче, чем гроза"	Evgeniy Shmelev	Романтика 2020
2021	"Взойдет"	Semyon Bagirov	Singles
2021	"Мы будем жить" (feat. Лев Лещенко)	Semyon Bagirov	Singles

== Awards and nominations ==
- The album "Паранойя" (2010) was recognized as album of the year according to the sites Indarnb.ru & Rap.ru.
- The album "Прилетел" (2012) was recognized as album of the year according to the site Rap.ru.
- In 2010, he was nominated for an award by Russian Street Awards in the category "Discovery of the year".
