= Big Russian Boss =

Russian singer (born 1991)

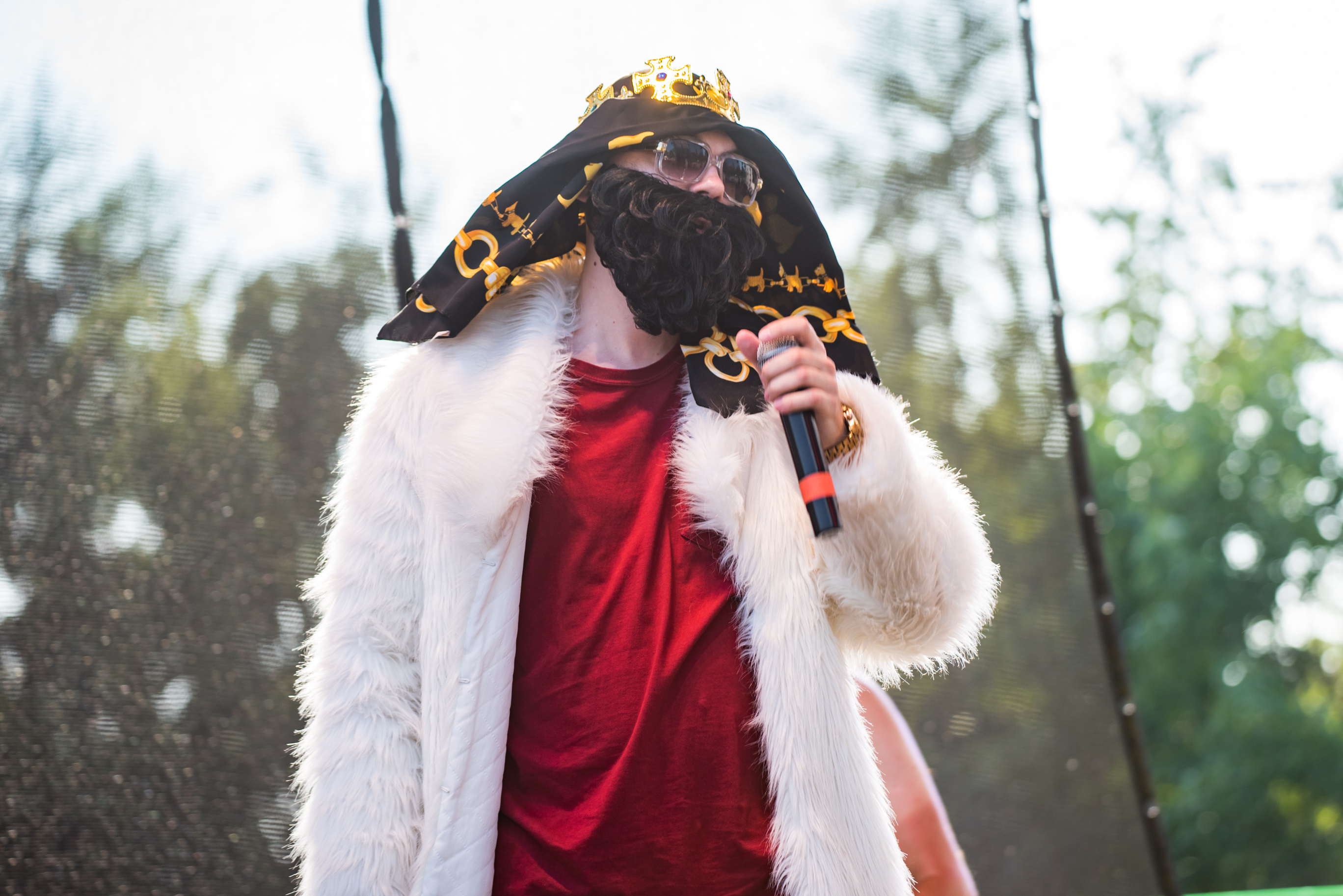

Background information
- Born: Igor Alekseyevich Lavrov; Игорь Алексеевич Лавров; June 8, 1991 (age 35); Samara, Russian SFSR, Soviet Union
- Genres: Hip hop; trap
- Occupations: Rapper; singer-songwriter; presenter; YouTuber
- Years active: 2010–present
- Labels: Koala Music, Soyuz, A+

Big Russian Boss (Russian: Биг Ра́шен Босс), real name Igor Alekseyevich Seravin (Note: at birth, his last name was "Lavrov") (Russian: И́горь Алексе́евич Сера́вин; born 8 June 1991, Samara) is a Russian rapper, musician, YouTube presenter, and member of the group Hustle Hard Flava.

== History ==
=== Big Russian Boss Show ===
On February 1, 2017, the "Big Russian Boss Show" YouTube channel reached one million subscribers, and in the first year of the show's existence, it reached more than two million.

=== Participation in other YouTube projects ===
On May 5, 2021, he took part in the interview program "Без души" with Danila Poperechny, where he first appeared before the general public without an image.

In March 2024, Big Russian Boss appeared as a guest star on the YouTube channel of the basketball media team "Hoops."

== Discography ==
=== Studio Albums ===
- 2014 — Big Russian Bo$$ — In Bo$$ We Trust
- 2015 — Big Russian Boss — I.G.O.R. (International God of Rap)
- 2019 — Big Russian Boss — G.O.L.D.

== Video ==
- 2016 — "Звёзды" (feat. Young P&H)
- 2017 — "Кто, если не Мы" (feat. MC Khovansky)
- 2017 — "Мне нравится" (feat. MOLLY)
- 2018 — "Шведский стол"
- 2018 — "Все впереди" (feat. MC Boyarsky)
- 2018 — "Не виноват" (feat. Yolka)
- 2019 — "Гена Букин" (feat. Dzharakhov, Тилэкс, Young P&H, DK, Morgenshtern, Khleb)
- 2020 — "Волк" (feat.. Roulanges)
- 2021 — "Нефертити" (feat. Rolana)
