= Gone.Fludd =

Russian rapper (born 1994)

GONE.Fludd Гон.Флад
- Born: Alexander Alexandrovich Smirnov; July 4, 1994 (age 32); Polyarny, Murmansk Oblast, Russia
- Genre: Hip hop
- Occupation: Rapper
- Years active: 2012–present

Alexander Alexandrovich Smirnov (Russian: Александр Александрович Смирнов; born July 4, 1994, Polyarny), better known as GONE.Fludd (Russian: Гон.Флад) is a Russian rapper, and co-founder of the association Glam Go Gang! He began his solo career in 2012 and has since released five studio albums and seven EPs.

== Biography ==
Eventually, the members of the Sabbat Cult (including him) joined the YungRussia coalition. Sabbat then left the coalition along with other groups.

Gone.Fludd is most notable for the album "Boys Don’t Cry", released in April 2018. The distributor was Sony Music Russia.

In the fall of 2018, he took part in the filming of the video for Little Big's song "Skibidi", where he and Morgenshtern played the roles of bandits who were taken along to the showdown by the band's vocalist Ilya Prusikin.

On December 13, the artist announced the creation of the group "Glam Go Gang!", which, in addition to himself, included Iroh, Cakeboy and Flipper Floyd.

On 22 November 2019 his fifth EP "Одиночная психическая атака" was released. The album became the most controversial, unlike the previous ones.

== Awards and nominations ==
Year	Ceremony	Category	Results
2018	ZD Awards	Hip-Hop artist of the year	Nominated
2018	Jager Music Awards	Hip-Hop artist of the year	Nominated
