= Rakhim =

Uzbekistan-born Russian rapper (born 1998)

Rakhim Рахим Абрамов
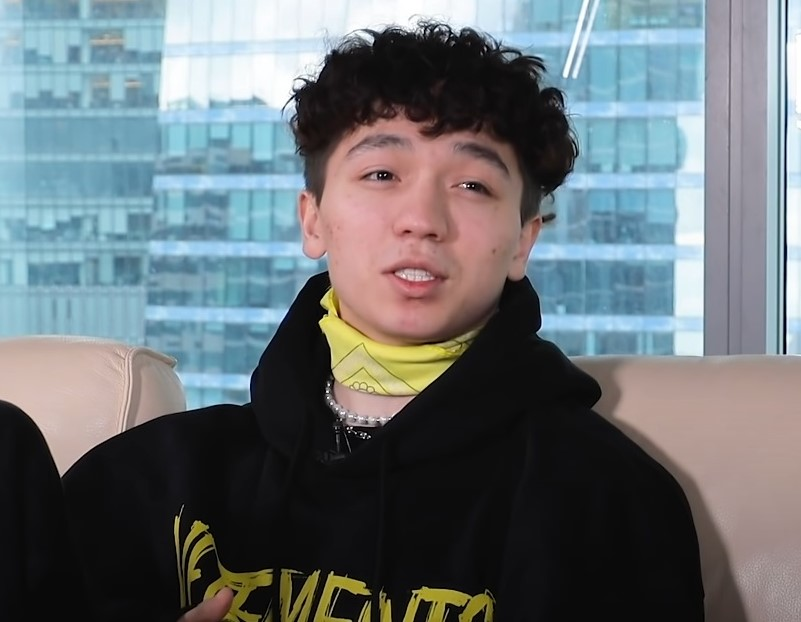

Background information
- Born: 15 March 1998 (age 28); Uzbekistan
- Occupations: Rapper; video blogger

Rakhim Abramov (Russian: Рахим Абрамов; born 15 March 1998), known professionally as Rakhim, is an Uzbekistan-born Russian rapper and video blogger. He became known for comedy videos on Instagram and TikTok and for his 2020 single "Fendi". In 2020, Forbes Russia ranked him first among the highest-earning Russian-speaking TikTok creators, estimating his earnings from July 2019 through June 2020 at 10.47 million rubles.

== Early life ==
Abramov was born in Uzbekistan and grew up in Siberia. He attended a sports school in Chita, where he trained as a boxer. In a 2020 interview with GQ Russia, he said that he stopped boxing at 16 for health reasons. After an unsuccessful application to a technical college, he moved to Moscow and enrolled in a programming course at the college of the Russian New University.

== Career ==
=== Social media and television ===
While studying in Moscow, Abramov and a classmate made videos for YouTube before turning to comedy sketches on Instagram. Their joint account attracted about 300,000 followers in a year, after which Abramov began making videos independently. He later joined TikTok with the help of Dina Saeva. In 2018, he appeared in the third season of the dating show Serdtsa za lyubov on STS Love.

By October 2020, Abramov had approximately 9.5 million TikTok followers. His comedy videos and music contributed to his position at the top of Forbes Russia's first ranking of the highest-earning Russian-speaking TikTok creators.

=== Music ===
Abramov released "Кто тебе сказал?" in April 2020. The song, which used an instrumental by Slava Marlow, was an early success in his music career. His single "Fendi" followed on 17 July 2020. By October, TikTok users had made more than three million videos using the song. He released "Milly Rock" on 25 September 2020, and the music video for "Fendi" on 12 October. The video was directed by Mikhail Kumarov.

In January 2021, R3hab and Smokepurpp collaborated with Rakhim on a new version of "Fendi". That year, he released "Синий Lamborghini" and appeared in Bella Poarch's music video for "Build a Bitch". The music video for his single "Этой ночью", released in August, featured TikTok creator Alina Kim. He also collaborated with Eldzhey on "Urus", for which a music video was released in November 2021.

Later releases included "Look at Me Habibi" in 2023, and the collaborations "Bella Hadid" (2024) and "Не бойся" (2025) with Nyusha.

=== Acting ===
Abramov played Artur in the 2022 comedy film Molodoy chelovek.

== Selected discography ==
=== Extended plays ===
Title	Year	Collaborator	Ref.
Habibi	2026	ayv1o	
Back	2026	ayv1o	

=== Singles ===
Title	Year	Other artists	Ref.
"Кто тебе сказал?"	2020	—	
"Fendi"	2020	—	
"Milly Rock"	2020	—	
"Fendi" (remix)	2021	R3hab and Smokepurpp	
"Синий Lamborghini"	2021	—	
"Этой ночью"	2021	—	
"Urus"	2021	Eldzhey	
"Аккорды"	2022	Konfuz	
"Look at Me Habibi"	2023	—	
"Bella Hadid"	2024	Nyusha	
"Не бойся"	2025	Nyusha	
"Plan B"	2025	The Limba	
