= Slava Marlow discography =

Discography of Slava Marlow

The discography of Russian music producer and song writer Slava Marlow consists of three studio albums, three mini-albums & 26 singles (including seven as a guest artist), as well as 47 songs produced for other singers.

== Studio albums ==
List of albums with details
Title	Details	Highest charted position
Title	Details	Russia Apple Music
Опенинг (Opening) (as Manny)	Release: 27 July 2019; Label: MediaCube Music; Format: CD, streaming	—
20	Release: 3 November 2019; Label: MediaCube Music; Format: CD, streaming	241
Тузик (Tuzik)	Release: 16 December 2022; Label: Independent; Format: CD, streaming	—
Эльф 1 (Elf 1)	Release: 13 June 2025; Label: Lotus Music; Format: CD, streaming	—

== EP ==
List of albums and details
Title	Details	Highest charted positions	
Title	Details	Azerbaijan Apple Music	Russia Apple Music
Галерея (Galery)	Release: 29 September 2018; Format: streaming, direct download	—	—
Артём (Artyom)	Release: 23 October 2020; Label: Zhara Distribution; Format: CD, streaming	5	4
"★" (as europesatan)	Release: 18 November 2022; Label: Independent; Format: CD, streaming	—	—

== Singles ==
Year	Title	Highest charted position															Album
Year	Title	Monthly charts							Monthly charts				Monthly charts				Album
Year	Title	Azerbaijan Apple Music	Belarus iTunes	Kazakhstan iTunes	Lithuania iTunes	Russia Apple Music	Russia iTunes	Moldova iTunes	Russia Radio & YouTube Hits	Russia YouTube Hits	Ukraine Youtube Hits	Ukraine Radio & YouTube Hits	Russia Radio & YouTube Hits	Russia YouTube Hits	Ukraine Radio & YouTube Hits	Ukraine YouTube Hits	Album
2019	«Дикий запад»	—	—	—	—	—	—	—	—	—	—	—	—	—	—	—	Non-album single
2019	«Будь проще»	—	—	—	—	—	—	—	—	—	—	—	—	—	—	—	Non-album single
2020	«No Problem»	—	—	—	—	—	—	—	—	—	—	—	—	—	—	—	Non-album single
2020	«Tik Tok Челлендж»	—	142	27	—	—	31	58	—	—	—	—	—	—	—	—	Non-album single
2020	«Сумасшедший»	—	—	—	—	—	—	33	—	—	—	—	—	—	—	—	Non-album single
2020	«Ты дура, прости»	—	—	—	—	—	—	—	—	—	—	—	—	—	—	—	Non-album single
2020	«Снова я напиваюсь»	14	—	9	186	1	17	—	16	3	1	1	24	4	3	1	«Артём»
2020	«Злой»	—	—	—	—	8	170	—	—	11	11	—	—	—	—	—	«Артём»
2020	«Быстро»	44	—	—	—	3	160	—	—	—	—	—	—	—	—	—	«Артём»
2020	«По глазам»	19	—	—	—	4	40	—	—	24	11	—	—	—	—	—	«Артём»
2020	«Нет проблем»	88	—	—	—	6	16	—	—	—	—	—	—	—	—	—	Non-album single
2021	"Ты горишь как огонь"	8	3	—	—	1	2	—	13	—	—	—	—	—	—	—	Non-album single
2021	"Кому это надо?"	—	—	29	—	1	88	—	125	30	—	—	—	—	—	—	Non-album single
2021	«Camry 3.5»	79	—	—	—	7	46	1	—	—	—	—	—	—	—	—	Non-album single
2021	«Она тебя любит» (with The Limba & Eldzhey)	—	—	—	—	—	—	—	—	—	—	—	—	—	—	—	Non-album single
2021	«Человек»	—	—	—	—	—	—	—	—	—	—	—	—	—	—	—	Non-album single
2021	«Я не знаю» (with Morgenshtern)	—	—	—	—	—	—	—	—	—	—	—	—	—	—	—	Non-album single
2021	«Бриллианты VVS» (with HammAli & Navai)	—	—	—	—	—	—	—	—	—	—	—	—	—	—	—	Non-album single
2021	«Хотел тебе сказать...»	—	—	—	—	—	—	—	—	—	—	—	—	—	—	—	Non-album single
2021	«Дикий я» (with Дикими Скричерами)	—	—	—	—	—	—	—	—	—	—	—	—	—	—	—	Non-album single
2021	«Бизнес вумен» (with Aarne)	—	—	—	—	—	—	—	—	—	—	—	—	—	—	—	Aa Language
2021	«Кто сказал?» (with Soda Luv & Rakhim)	—	—	—	—	—	—	—	—	—	—	—	—	—	—	—	Non-album single
2021	«Миллион дорог»	—	—	—	—	—	—	—	—	—	—	—	—	—	—	—	Non-album single
2022	«Saint Laurent»	—	—	—	—	—	—	—	—	—	—	—	—	—	—	—	Non-album single
2022	«Расстреляй меня»	—	—	—	—	—	—	—	—	—	—	—	—	—	—	—	Non-album single
2022	«Где найти силы»	—	—	—	—	—	—	—	—	—	—	—	—	—	—	—	Non-album single

== Featured guests ==
Year	Title	Other singers	Album
2020	«Съел деда»	Morgenshtern	«Легендарная пыль»
2020	«Домофон / Чича»	Morgenshtern, Frame Tamer	«Легендарная пыль»
2020	«Мой гэнг»	Stephan Pie	«Не паникуй!»
2020	«Sweethouse»	Motorollasheff	Motorollasheff2023
2020	«Выше» (as Manny)	Motorollasheff	Motorollasheff2023
2021	«Ой да на рейве»	Ilych & Sofiya	Non-album single
2021	«Shivers»	Ed Sheeran, Feduk	Non-album single

== Producer Discography ==
Year	Title	Album
2018	«ЧСВ» (N.Masteroff, Timurka Bits)	Outgrown
2019	«Дикий запад» (N.Masteroff, Slava Marlow)	Non-album single
2019	«Я богатый)))» (N.Masteroff, Stephan Pie)	Non-album single
2019	«Будь проще» (Yusha, Slava Marlow)	Non-album single
2019	«GTA» (Instasamka, СМН)	Non-album single
2019	«Yung Hefner» (Morgenshtern)	Non-album single
2020	«Я пыль» (Morgenshtern)	«Легендарная пыль»
2020	«Съел деда» (Morgenshtern, Slava Marlow)	«Легендарная пыль»
2020	«Четыре украинки» (Morgenshtern)	«Легендарная пыль»
2020	«Е! Банная» (Morgenshtern)	«Легендарная пыль»
2020	«Она — оно» (Morgenshtern)	«Легендарная пыль»
2020	«Красное вино фристайл» (Morgenshtern, Frame Tamer)	«Легендарная пыль»
2020	«Домофон / Чича» (Morgenshtern, Frame Tamer, Slava Marlow)	«Легендарная пыль»
2020	«Ратататата» (Morgenshtern, Витя АК)	«Легендарная пыль»
2020	«Опа» (Morgenshtern)	«Легендарная пыль»
2020	«Последняя» (Morgenshtern)	«Легендарная пыль»
2020	«Малышка» (Morgenshtern, Шарлот)	Non-album single
2020	«Не в обиду» (N.Masteroff)	«Все мечты давно сгорели»
2020	«В слэм!» (N.Masteroff)	«Все мечты давно сгорели»
2020	«Кто тебе сказал?» (Rakhim)	Non-album single
2020	«GGNB» (BRFF, Slava Marlow, CMH)	Non-album single
2020	«Pososi» (Morgenshtern)	Non-album single
2020	«Cadillac» (Morgenshtern, Eldzhey)	Non-album single
2020	«Чёрный бумер» (Dava, Seryoga)	«Король»
2020	«Ice» (Morgenshtern)	Non-album single
2020	«Fendi» (Rakhim)	Non-album single
2020	«Кендрик Ламар» (Stephan Pie, CMH, MediynayaBlad, N.Masteroff)	«Не паникуй!»
2020	«Мой гэнг!» (Stephan Pie, Slava Marlow)	«Не паникуй!»
2020	«На беду» (Stephan Pie, CMH, MediynayaBlad)	«Не паникуй!»
2020	«Intro2023» (Motorollasheff)	Motorollasheff2023
2020	«Tik-Tak» (Motorollasheff)	Motorollasheff2023
2020	«Sweethouse» (Motorollasheff, Slava Marlow)	Motorollasheff2023
2020	«Выше» (Motorollasheff, Manny)	Motorollasheff2023
2020	«Мусор» (Motorollasheff)	Motorollasheff2023
2020	«El Problema» (Morgenshtern, Timati)	«Транзит»
2020	«Watafuk?!» (Morgenshtern, Lil Pump)	Non-album single
2020	«Клип за 10 лямов» (Morgenshtern)	Non-album single
2020	«Слякоть» (PlohoyParen)	Non-album single
2020	«Cristal &amp; Моёт» (Morgenshtern)	Non-album single
2021	«Есть деньги нет чувств» (ЛСП)	Non-album single
2021	«Wunder King» (Eldzhey)	Non-album single
2021	«Дуло» (Morgenshtern)	Non-album single
2021	«Cristal &amp; Моёт (Remix)» (Morgenshtern, Soda Luv, Blago White, OG Buda, Mayot)	Non-album single
2021	«Последний бит от Славы» (Morgenshtern)	Million Dollar: Happiness
2021	«Hublot» (Morgenshtern)	Million Dollar: Business
2021	«Кто сказал?» (Slava Marlow, Rakhim, Soda Luv)	Non-album single
2022	«Обычный парень» (Некоглай, ivanzolo2004)	Non-album single
