= Cadillac (Morgenshtern and Eldzhey song) =

2020 single by Morgenshtern & Eldzhey

Single by Morgenshtern, Eldzhey
- Language: Russian
- Released: June 9, 2020
- Genre: Russian hip hop; Mumble rap
- Length: 2:57
- Label: Atlantic Records Russia
- Producer: Slava Marlow

"Cadillac" is a song by Russian hip-hop singers Morgenshtern & Eldzhey, released on 9 June 2020 through the label Zhara Music, with the musical producer being Slava Marlow.

== Music video ==
The release of the music video for the track was released on 9 July on Morgenshtern's official YouTube channel, which also was Eldzhey's birthday.

The video's directors were Jan Bokhanovich & Roman Nekhoda. Bokhanovich has worked with Egor Kreed, T-Fest, Miyagi, Mot & other popular singers.

== Awards and nominations ==
| Year | Award | Category | Result | Ref. |
|---|---|---|---|---|
| 2021 | Муз-ТВ | Best collaboration | Nominated | |
| 2021 | Муз-ТВ | Best song | Nominated | |

=== Ratings ===
| Year | Platform | Rating | Place | Ref. |
|---|---|---|---|---|
| 2020 | Apple Music | Top 10 songs | 5 | |
| 2020 | YouTube | Top 10 music videos | 6 | |
| 2020 | VK | Top 30 tracks | 3 | |
| 2020 | The Flow | 50 best songs of 2020 | 50 | |
