= Malishka (song) =

Single by Morgenshtern & Sharlot
- Language: Russian
- Released: March 8, 2020
- Genre: Pop
- Length: 2:32
- Label: Atlantic Records Russia
- Producer: Slava Marlow

Malishka (Russian: Малышка) is a song by Russian hip-hop singer Morgenshtern & singer Sharlot, released on 8 March 2020 through the label Zhara Atlantic Records Russia and is dedicated to International Women's Day. In this song Morgenshtern & Sharlot confessed their love to girls.

This song with Sharlot is a continuation of a series of joint songs by Morgenshtern. In December 2019, Morgenshtern wrote the song "Мне Пох" together with Klava Koka, and in February 2020 he released a music video for the song "Ратататата", written with AK-47.

== History ==
Morgenshtern published footage from the filming of the video a month before the song was released, where he wished everyone a happy Valentine's Day.

== Music video ==
The music video for the song was released on 8 March on Morgenshtern's official YouTube-channel, the same day the song was released. The video was shot by Basket Films and Nikita Zamoisky.

== Charts ==
Chart (2020)	Peak position
Russia (VK)	9
