= Artyom (EP) =

EP by Slava Marlow
- Released: October 23, 2020
- Genres: rap; hip hop
- Length: 9:01
- Language: Russian
- Label: Atlantic Records Russia
- Producer: Slava Marlow (himself)

Artyom (Russian: "Артём") is the second extended play (EP) by Russian rapper and music producer Slava Marlow, which was released on 23 October 2020. The album features guest appearances from Eldzhey and Morgenshtern. The EP had a previously released single, "Снова я напиваюсь", which was released on 7 October 2020.

== Background ==
On 26 September 2020, Slava Marlow decided that he would move out of his shared home with Morgenshtern to focus on his own career.

== Song descriptions ==
"Артём" is a nine-minute EP, consisting of five tracks.

- "Артём" (Skit) — the first composition on the album. He is the monologue performer, taken from his self-titled video on YouTube.
- "Снова я напиваюсь" — the only single from the EP. A snippet of the song was posted on 8 September 2020 via Instagram.
- "Быстро" (featuring MORGENSHTERN) — the first time the song was performed in the rockstyle at one of Morgenstern's concerts on 17 October 2020.
- "Злой" (featuring Eldzhey) — the first snippet of the song was posted in May 2020. It was also played a day before the release of the EP at the end of the music video "Артём".
- "По глазам" — an excerpt of the song was posted on 30 July 2020. Slava Marlow said: "This track, which will likely never come out, well, or only after my death, if I sign with a label and die, then a cool producer will competently put some hype artist on the track and promote it". The song is dedicated to Marlow's girlfriend who died in a traffic accident in 2011.

== EP cover ==
The cover shows Slava's passport, which lists his real name, surname and patronymic.

== Singles ==
On 7 October 2020, the first and only single from the EP "Снова я напиваюсь" was released. On 22 October 2020, the song debuted at number one on Apple Music.

== Ratings ==
| Year | Platform | Rating | Position | Ref. |
|---|---|---|---|---|
| 2021 | Apple Music | Top-10 albums in Russia | 3 | |
| 2021 | VK | Top albums of the year | 5 | |

== List of compositions ==
According to Genius.

All music is composed by Slava Marlow.

| No. | Title | Length |
|---|---|---|
| 1. | "Артём (Skit)" | 0:30 |
| 2. | "Снова я напиваюсь" | 1:57 |
| 3. | "Быстро" (together with Morgenshtern) | 1:56 |
| 4. | "Злой" (together with Eldzhey) | 2:38 |
| 5. | "По глазам" | 2:00 |
| Total length: | | 9:01 |
