= Cristal & Moet =

Single by Morgenshtern
- Language: Russian
- Released: December 28, 2020
- Genre: Rap; Hip Hop
- Length: 2:17
- Label: Zhara Distribution
- Producer: Slava Marlow

"Cristal & Moet" (Russian:"Cristal & Моёт"; stylized as "Cristal & МОЁТ") is a song by Russian rap-singer Morgenshtern, released on 28 December 2020 through the label Atlantic Records Russia as a non-album single. A music video was simultaneously released alongside the song, which was filmed by Romanov Production. In the clip, Morgenshtern describes his experience in 2020, which was a successful year for him. On 14 May 2021, a remix to the song was released, which is a reworked version of the song with new lyrics and guest verses from rappers OG Buda, Soda Luv, Mayot & Blago White.

== Creation and release ==
On 23 December 2020, Morgenshtern announced a music release on his Instagram stories.

=== Music video ===
The music video to the song was officially released on 28 December 2020 on Morgenshtern's YouTube channel, on the day the single was released. At the start of the video, inserts of news broadcasts covering Morgenshtern appear. He then shows off his cars and showers his beloved Dilara Zinatullina with Cristal champagne, and then he recounts his experience in 2020, detailing his successes. In less than 24 hours, the video garnered more than 4.2 million views. The director of the video was Alexander Romanov.

== Ratings ==
Year	Platform	Rating	Place	Ref.
2021	The Flow	50 best songs of 2021	9	
2021	Spotify	Summer 2021: Top-20 in Russia	5	
2021	Apple Music	Top-10 tracks in Russia	9	
2021	VK	Top Tracks of the Year	5	
2021	Spotify	Top 5 tracks in Russia	1	
