= Last One (album) =

Studio album by Morgenshtern
- Released: 21 October 2022
- Genres: hip-hop, rap, pop, drawl
- Length: 41:39
- Language: Russian
- Label: Bugatti Music

Morgenshtern chronology
Million Dollar: Business (2021)	Last One (2022)	Golden Hits (2023)

Last One (stylized as majuscule) is the sixth studio album by Russian rap singer and musician Morgenshtern. It was released on October 21, 2022, on the Bugatti Music label, distributed by ONErpm. The album contains guest participation from The Limba, LSP, Eldzhey and Entype. According to Alisher, this is his last album in Russian language.

== Backstory ==
On November 24, 2021, after Home of the chairman of the Investigative Committee Alexander Bastrykin of drug trafficking on social media, Alisher left Russia for the OAE.

In the summer of 2022, Morgenstern announced his intentions to release one last album in Russian. In his video message, the artist stated that he has a lot of tracks that he can release once a month and do nothing else for three years. "But the question that arises here is this: will humanity live for three more years? And if it does, will I as an artist in Russia be able to live that long? Or tomorrow I will be stripped of my citizenship and forbidden to mention?", - said the rapper, after which he decided to combine the tracks into one album, adding, 'And then I, like Vanya Face, will go to write in English'. Alisher also announced a concert tour of the US. The artist faced problems promoting the album due to various restrictions in Russia: "I can't get any promos out. My album can't be put on any banners in Russia. And, by the way, the question is: why should I? What am I, an enemy of the state? What have I done? All the last songs - they are sad, not very energetic. Didn't feel very good inside for a while. I've regained my energy. I'm tired of writing sad songs. I'm not gonna be sad anymore."

In October 2022, Alisher revealed the album's track list, with guests including The Limba, Zamai, LSP, Kizaru, Feduk, Milana Khametova, and Milana Star. The track list was taken as a joke, as Kizaru has long refused to collaborate with Morgenstern; the track "Bum" with Feduk is a reference to Feduk's words about the artists' collaboration: "Even if I'm a bum, you won't hear a collaboration with Morgenstern"; the diss on Skriptonite contradicts Alisher's words about his love for Adil's work. Kizaru responded to the published track list: "I'm begging you, man, leave me alone. I get it: marketing, all that stuff. You tell everyone you're my fan, so have some respect then, even though you're hardly familiar with that word".

Before the release of the album Alisher took part in the show "Vpiska", where he talked about the new album, as well as showed Vasya and Kolya all the tracks from the album, which in a small number were included as snippets in the video. According to Alisher, he is confident in the success of the album, and the track "Yeye" is currently his favorite song for all times of his musical career. Also, according to Alisher, just a couple of songs, in his opinion, will become hits, thanks to which the album can still bring him back to the same former fame.

== Video clips ==
On October 20, 2022, the music video for the song "Balance" from the upcoming album was released in 2021. The music video shows footage from the wedding of Alisher and Dilara Zinatullina. Later this clip was removed from the YouTube channel due to the final divorce with Dilara Zinatullina.

The day after the album's release, on October 22, Alisher posted a video clip of "Yeee" filmed during the concert and on the streets in Amsterdam.

On October 28, 2022, the music video for the song "Sheikh" was released, filmed in Dubai.

On November 23, 2022, a music video for a collaborative song with Eldzhey was released. "Location". The location of the music video was filmed in the OAE, Dubai.

== Track listing ==
Track list information is taken from Tidal., about the producers from YouTube

No.	Title	Producer(s)	Length
1.	"*"		0:28
2.	"Teaser"	Illuminati	3:03
3.	"Bestie" (in conjunction with The Limba)	Palagin	1:55
4.	"Tatu"	Palagin	2:22
5.	"Герой" (Skit)		0:15
6.	"CCTV"	Palagin	2:34
7.	"Ugu"	Palagin	2:37
8.	"Sheikh"	Palagin	2:10
9.	"Дор блю" (in conjunction with LSP)	Illuminati	2:56
10.	"Guf Diss"	Palagin	2:24
11.	"B"	Palagin	3:02
12.	"Вернуть прошлое" (Скит)		0:26
13.	"Balance"	Blackchain	2:48
14.	"Ночь, такси, заметки"	Palagin and Illuminati	2:48
15.	"Я понял" (Скит)		1:20
16.	"Eeee"	Illuminati	2:38
17.	"Katrina"	Palagin	2:57
18.	"Location" (in conjunction with Eldzhey)	Palagin	2:29
19.	"10 секунд перед последним треком" (Скит)		0:10
20.	"Вставал падал" (in conjunction with Entype)	Морено Тайрон Гийсберс	2:17
Total length:			41:39

== Recording participants ==
Information taken from Genius.

- Morgenshtern - main performer, songwriter
- Palagin - producer, songwriter, mastering engineer, arrangement
- Andrei Katikov - producer, songwriter
- Blackchain - producer, songwriter
- Moreno Tyrone Gijsbers - producer, songwriter
- Rio Leyva - producer
- Creamy - mastering engineer, mixing and mixing
- Podlesny Twins
- The Limba - The Limba
- Eldzhey - guest performer
- LSP - guest performer
- Entype is a guest performer
