= Million Dollar: Happiness =

2021 album by Morgenshtern

Studio album by Morgenshtern
- Released: 21 May 2021
- Genre: Hip hop
- Length: 22:08
- Language: Russian
- Label: Atlantic Records Russia

Morgenshtern chronology
Legendary Dust (2020)	Million Dollar: Happiness (2021)	Million Dollar: Business (2021)

Million Dollar: Business

Studio album by Morgenshtern
- Released: May 28, 2021
- Genres: Hip hop, Pop rap
- Length: 28:28
- Language: Russian
- Label: Atlantic Records Russia

Million Dollar: Happiness is the fourth studio album by Russian rapper and singer Morgenshtern, released on 21 May 2021 through the label Atlantic Records Russia. The album was preceded by the single "Show", which was released on 17 May 2021.

It was following, one week later, by Million Dollar: Business, the fifth studio album of Russian rapper and musician Morgenshtern, released on 28 May 2021 through the label Atlantic Records Russia.

== Title ==
According to some publications, the title of the album Million Dollar: Happiness is a reference to rapper Pharaoh's record Million Dollar Depression.

== Critical reception ==
The Flow pointed out that Million Dollar: Happiness was released on the birthday of rapper Oleg "Kizaru" Nechiporenko, with whom Morgenshtern has a long-standing conflict. The album was also accompanied by VK stickers, the pictures of which depict Kizaru himself, and they themselves are a sarcastic diminutive "Кизяка." In response to this, Oleg was going to withdraw all of his tracks from VK, according to a source familiar with the situation.

Million Dollar: Business reached its first million views on the platform VK 26 minutes after its release. Within 24 hours, the number of plays reached more than 16 million.

== Accolades ==
Accolades for Million Dollar: Happiness
Publisher	Rating	Position	Ref.
VK	Top Albums of the Year	8	

== Track listing ==
Million Dollar: Happiness track listing
No.	Title	Writer(s)	Producer	Length
1.	"Show"	Alisher Morgenshtern; Alisher Abdulakrimov	Leezey; Marlow Beats	1:38
2.	"Бебебе"	Morgenshtern; Aleksandr Merzlyakov; Oleg Beknazarov	Diamond Style; Обозначен как «DS»	2:08
3.	"Искусство за 90900 (Скит)"	Morgenshtern	Morgenshtern	0:40
4.	"Ретро рейв"	Morgenshtern; Aleksey Potekhin; Sergei Zhukov; Aleksandr Markov	Gredy	2:47
5.	"No Mo Luv"	Morgenshtern; Aleksandr Markov	Gredy	2:18
6.	"Слава вернись" (Interlude)	Morgenshtern	Morgenshtern	2:15
7.	"Скит от Славы"	Morgenshtern; Artyom Gotlieb	Morgenshtern, Slava Marlow	1:03
8.	"Последний бит от Славы"	Morgenshtern; Gotlieb	Slava Marlow	1:17
9.	"Скит заблокирован. Слив в телеге" (previously "Скит от первого канала")	Morgenshtern	Morgenshtern	0:20
10.	"Чёрный бумер"	Morgenshtern; Aleksandr Markov; Maksim Postoev	Gredy; Baggo	2:38
11.	"Ты ослеп"	Morgenshtern; Igor Vlasov	XWinner	2:06
12.	"Можно сфоткаться?"	Morgenshtern; Igor Negulyaev	Pretty Scream	1:05
13.	"Pablo"	Morgenshtern; Гаррингтон Спенс	Gerard	1:53
Total length:				22:08

For Million Dollar: Business: and VK.

No.	Title	Writer(s)	Producer	Length
1.	"Olala"	Morgenshtern; Aleksandr Markov	Gredy	2:22
2.	"Aristocrat"	Morgenshtern; Aleksandr Markov	Gredy	2:06
3.	"Hublot"	Morgenshtern; Slava Marlow	Slava Marlow	2:03
4.	"Nominalo"	Morgenshtern; Igor Vlasov	XWinner	2:12
5.	"GTA"	Morgenshtern; Ruslan Valeev	Vacemadest	2:07
6.	"Скит от @VSBattleVideo"	Morgenshtern	Morgenshtern	0:46
7.	"Папин танк"	Morgenshtern; Aleksandr Merzlyakov; Oleg Beknazarov	Diamond Style	2:07
8.	"Dinero"	Morgenshtern; Ruslan Valeev	Vacemadest	2:38
9.	"Мания"	Alisher Morgenshtern; Iskander Suleimanov	lskanther	2:00
10.	"Я на таблах"	Morgenshtern; Aleksandr Zaporozhets	Onix Beat	2:26
11.	"Когда нас отпустит"	Morgenshtern; Roman Mironchenko; Victor Mashinistov	Swamiq · Vic Handsome	2:49
12.	"Pull Up"	Morgenshtern; Alexey Maximov; Oleg Gladyanov	ERROR696 · Blackchain	2:12
13.	"Я когда-нибудь уйду"	Morgenshtern; Daniel Alguacil Monso; Luis Vitkevitz	Danny Mads · WizzleGotBeats	2:40
Total length:				28:28
