= El Problema (Morgenshtern song) =

Single by Morgenshtern and Timati
- Released: 18 September 2020
- Genre: Hip-hop
- Label: Timati
- Producer: Slava Marlow

Morgenshtern and Timati singles chronology
"Lollipop" (2020)	"El Problema" (2020)	"Watafuk?!" (2020)

Music video
- "El Problema" on YouTube

"El Problema" is a song by Russian hip-hop artists Morgenshtern and Timati, released on 18 September 2020, and produced by Slava Marlow.

== Background ==
On 4 July 2020, music producer Slava Marlow together with Morgenstern released a video on YouTube, in which Slava offered Timati to produce the track, and Morgenstern to write the lyrics and promote the song. The main condition of the cooperation is that the song should not undergo any modifications.

On 6 July 2020, Timati published a video on YouTube in which he accepted the artists' offer, but on the condition that they would take part in the music video for the song based on Timati's script without the right to change the music video on their part, and that the music video would contain as much advertising as Timati desired.

On 20 August 2020, publications appeared on the internet that Slava, Alisher and Timati were in Sochi filming. Among the locations was a casino.

On 22 August 2020, Morgenstern and Slava published a response to Timati's video in which they accepted his terms.

On 2 September 2020, Slava Marlow's YouTube channel released a video of Timati's visit to visit Morgenstern and Slava, where the single was recorded.

On 17 September 2020, the song was leaked online. On the night of 17–18 September, its official release took place.

On October 2020, Slava Marlow and Morgenstern posted a YouTube video in which they revealed the song's "top secret". The flatulence sound performed by Morgenstern was added to the bass of the song. According to the musicians' assurance, Timati was not aware of this feature of the beat.

== Music ==
The song was produced by Russian music producer Slava Marlow. The song uses elements of electronic beats, 808s bass and violin, which was used at Timati's request since he graduated from a music school with a violin class.

== Music video ==
The official music video for the song, directed by Zaur Zaseev (Hoodyakov production), premiered on September 18, 2020.

The music video had a lot of advertising, which, as stated at the end of the video, brought the musicians 50,000,000 rubles "even before its release". Among the brands in the video was Bashspirt, which held a tender for advertising in the video in the summer with a starting amount of 8.1 million rubles.
