= You're burning like fire =

"Ты горишь как огонь"

Single by Slava Marlow
- Language: Russian
- English title: You're burning like fire
- Released: February 19, 2021
- Genre: Rap; Hip Hop
- Length: 2:20
- Label: Atlantic Records Russia
- Producer: Slava Marlow (himself)

""You're burning like fire" (Russian: "Ты горишь как огонь") is a song by Russian music producer and vlogger Slava Marlow, released on 19 February 2021 as a single through the label Zhara Distribution.

== Description ==
For the main theme of the composition, Slava Marlow chose a story about his love & difficulties in relationships. In the words of the producer, the release of the composition is meant to coincide with Fire day.

== History ==
According to the site Srsly.ru, Slava Marlow announced he shot "the most expensive video of his life", and later published a video on his Instagram-stories, where he is dancing against a background of fire.

The release of the lyric video to the song was on 19 February 2021 on Slava Marlow's official YouTube-channel, the same day the single was released. On 8 March of that year, the official music video to the song was released, which starred blogger Karina "karrambaby".

== Reviews ==
The director of the hip-hop site The Flow noted that "Ты горишь как огонь" "was literally designed to fly to the top of the charts". A journalist for the website Rap.ru also noted that it would «conquer the charts" and that the sound is "recognizable", especially the text about love and chorus lines, "You're burning, like fire. I'm in agony...Is it love or is it paranoia?" which "play into the hands of the musician". Ulyana Pirogova from TNT Music called "Ты горишь как огонь" "a powerful new product", filled with "crackling new beats" & "shrill hooks" and stated that the composition "sounds like a sequel to 'Снова я напиваюсь'".

== Ratings ==
Year	Platform	Rating	Position	Ref.
2021	YouTube	Top-10: Music video	6	
2021	The Flow	50 best songs of 2021	5	
