= Sad Song (Thrill Pill song) =

2019 single by Thrill Pill, Egor Kreed & Morgenshtern

Single by Thrill Pill feat. Egor Kreed & Morgenshtern

from the album Revelations
- Language: Russian
- English title: Sad Song
- Released: November 1, 2019
- Genre: Mumble rap
- Length: 3:44
- Label: Warner Music Russia
- Producer: Viramaina

"Sad Song" (Russian: Грустная песня) is a song by Russian hip-hop singer Thrill Pill featuring singer Egor Kreed & rap singer Morgenshtern, released on 1 November 2019 through the label Warner Music Russia. The single topped the charts on Apple Music, VK & Genius, and it was part of Thrill Pill's debut studio album Revelations.

== Music video ==
The music video was released the same day the single came out, collecting more than one million views in a single day.

The video was produced by Airat Fattakhov & Svetlana Laki, who produced Egor Kreed's previous music video "Cerdtseyedka".

In the first week, the video garnered 10 million views.

On 19 May 2020, the video was removed from the singer's YouTube channel due to a conflict with the label, though on 20 May it was officially released on WOW TV's YouTube channel.

== Ratings ==
Year	Platform	Rating	Place	Ref.
2019	The Flow	50 best songs of 2019	21	
2019	Rap.ru	12 of the most important tracks in Russian rap of 2019	—N/a	
