= Home (Morgenshtern song) =

Single by Morgenshtern
- Language: Russian
- Released: December 10, 2021
- Genre: Hip-hop
- Length: 2:52
- Label: Atlantic Records Russia

"Home" (Russian: Домой) is a single by Russian rapper Morgenshtern, released on December 10, 2021 by Atlantic Records Russia. In the song, Morgenshtern discusses his departure from Russia after accusations of "selling drugs on social media" from the chairman of the Investigative Committee of Russia, Alexander Bastrykin. The track was leaked to the internet on December 9, one day before its scheduled release.

== Background ==
On November 19, 2021, the Investigative Committee of the Russian Federation began investigating Morgenshtern for promoting drug use after the release of the video for the song "Pablo". According to investigators, the artist's content posted from 2013 to 2021 may contain calls that encourage people to use drugs. On November 23, 2021, Alexander Bastrykin, Chairman of the Investigative Committee of the Russian Federation, accused Morgenshtern of "trafficking drugs in social networks": "Morgenstern today deals drugs, in fact, on social networks. It involves a huge number of our youth in its sphere of communication," Bastrykin said at the conference "The Role of Law in Ensuring Human Welfare". Morgenstern's lawyer Sergei Zhorin told RBC that Bastrykin's statement was bewildering: "In this situation, what we think about it and how we will react is of secondary importance. It is important how the subordinates of Alexander Ivanovich Bastrykin will react to this. Will they take this as a call to action?". Six months before Bastrykin's statement, in June 2021, Morgenstern had been fined 100,000 rubles for promoting drugs in his videos. Following the accusations and the start of investigations, on November 24, the rapper left Russia for the United Arab Emirates.

== Lyrics ==
In the song, the rapper defends himself from the Committee's accusations: "Bitch, I only sell my face on the internet". On November 25, the day after leaving Russia, Morgenshtern's restaurant "Kaif" was closed after being inspected for selling illegal alcohol. In response, Morgenshtern states in the song: "You can take my business, but you won't take happiness. […] I won't starve to death".

The rapper commented on the news of his departure in the song: "I just got on the train (Choo-choo!). The news is louder than Oxxxymiron's comeback."

== Music video ==
The music video was filmed in Dubai, directed by Leonid Afetrov (Kingeleo). In addition to Morgenshtern, his wife Dilara and the Tajik singer Abdu Rozik are present in the video. At the beginning of the video, a REN TV report about Morgenstern's departure from Russia is played. Within the first few hours of its upload to YouTube, the music video reached No. 1 trending in Russia, receiving 1.5 million views.
