= Do togo kak stal izvesten =

Studio album by Morgenshtern
- Released: 12 October 2018
- Genre: Russian rap
- Length: 39:00
- Language: Russian
- Label: Yoola Music

Morgenshtern chronology
Hate Me (2018)	Do togo kak stal izvesten (2018)	Ulybnis, durak! (2019)

Do togo kak stal izvesten is the debut studio album by Russian video blogger and rap singer Morgenshtern, released on 12 October 2018 on the Yoola Music. In support of the album, Alisher went on a concert tour called RIP Morgenshtern Tour.

== Description ==
The album consists of 13 tracks shifting from rock to pop punk. There are no collaborative songs on the album. The album is a re-release to digital platforms of tracks that were recorded by Alisher back in 2017 under the nickname 1 July. The album includes tracks from two of Alisher's earlier albums, Garage (31 May 2017) and Happy B-Day (1 July 2017).

== Promotion ==
In connection with the release of the album, Alisher announced a drawing for a 250,000-ruble chain and two other prizes, which required reposting the album record from his VKontakte group to his page. Within three hours, about 30,000 reposts were made, and over 50,000 in 24 hours, which broke the previous record for reposts in a day, belonging to rapper LIZER, who managed to collect 28.2 thousand reposts in a day.

== Track listing ==
No.	Title	Продюсер	Length
1.	"Привет, я Алишер"	4Teen; Morgenshtern	2:31
2.	"Я пиздатый"	4Teen; Morgenshtern	1:53
3.	"Если я спал с тобой"	Morgenshtern	3:35
4.	"Мы так молоды"	4Teen; Morgenshtern	2:37
5.	"Кисоньке"	4Teen; Morgenshtern	2:48
6.	"Братосын"	4Teen; Morgenshtern	3:21
7.	"Пиво и скейтборд"	Morgenshtern	3:35
8.	"Молодость"	Morgenshtern	2:13
9.	"Я хороший"	Morgenshtern; Yung Trappa	3:01
10.	"Когда буду умирать"	4Teen; Morgenshtern	4:03
11.	"Сон"	Morgenshtern	3:11
12.	"Я бы хотел"	4Teen; Morgenshtern	2:39
13.	"Танцуй"	Morgenshtern	3:44
Total length:			39:11
