= Legendarnaja pyl' =

Studio album by Morgenshtern
- Released: 17 January 2020
- Recorded: 6–12 January 2020
- Genre: Hip hop
- Length: 20:51
- Language: Russian
- Label: Zhara Distribution
- Producer: Slava Marlow

Morgenshtern chronology
Ulybnis, durak! (2019)	Legendarnaja pyl' (2020)	Million Dollar: Happiness (2021)

Legendarnaja pyl' (Russian: Легендарная пыль, lit. 'Legendary dust', stylized in all caps) is the third studio album by Russian rap-singer Morgenshtern, released on 17 January 2020. The album was recorded live on YouTube, during a series of livestreams from 6 to 12 January 2020.

== Background ==
Morgenshtern announced his intention to record an album live in the music video for his song "Yung Hefner" on 20 December, 2019.

== Achievements ==
On 2 September, 2020, all of the songs combined were certified 22× platinum.

At the end of 2020, VK named Legendarnaja pyl' the album of the year on the platform.

== Track listing ==
All lyrics are written by Morgenshtern.

Legendarnaja pyl' track listing
No.	Title	Producer	Length
1.	"Ja pyl'"	Slava Marlow	1:48
2.	"S'el deda" (with Slava Marlow)	Slava Marlow	1:48
3.	"Chetyre ukrainki"	Slava Marlow	2:02
4.	"E! Bannaja"	Slava Marlow	2:15
5.	"Ona - ono"	Slava Marlow	1:37
6.	"Krasnoe vino fristayl" (with Frame Tamer)	Slava Marlow	2:51
7.	"Domofon / Chicha" (featuring Frame Tamer and Slava Marlow)	Slava Marlow	1:32
8.	"Ratatatata" (with AK-47)	Slava Marlow	1:58
9.	"Opa"	Slava Marlow	1:59
10.	"Poslednjaja"	Slava Marlow	3:01
Total length:			20:51
