= Sayonara Boy Opal =

Studio album by Eldzhey
- Released: February 27, 2020
- Genre: Russian rap
- Length: 31:42
- Languages: Russian, English
- Label: Universal Music Russia

Sayonara Boy Oраl is the fourth studio album Russian Hip-Hop singer Eldzhey, released on 27 February 2020 through the label Universal Music Russia.

== List of tracks ==
Information via Genius
No.	Title	Producer	Length
1.	"Платина"	G-POL	2:36
2.	"Летсгирит"	Gangan	2:26
3.	"Рарный айтем"	stereoRYZE	2:07
4.	"Fans"	G-POL & Galiv	2:35
5.	"Sayonara Mama Boy"	stereoRYZE	3:11
6.	"ТрэпХаусРок"	G-POL & stereoRYZE	3:42
7.	"Darknet"	Palagin	2:36
8.	"Toilet" (with Tommy Cash & Kosta Lacosta)	Gosha	3:50
9.	"Шейх"	Galiv & G-POL	2:57
10.	"Самурай"	Palagin	2:31
11.	"Кровосток"	Gangan	2:40
12.	"Дырки в голове"	Thunder6	2:31
13.	"Tamagotchi (Bonus)"	G-POL	3:00
Total length:			31:42
