= Number (Morgenshtern song) =

"Номер"

Single by Morgenshtern
- Released: April 26, 2022
- Genre: trap-jazz
- Length: 1:58
- Label: Illuminati Production

Morgenshtern singles chronology
"Selyavi" (2022)	"Номер" (2022)	"Famous" (2022)

"Number" (Russian: Номер) is a song by Russian rap artist and musician Morgenshtern, released on April 26, 2022, on an independent label through ONErpm. The song was produced by Illuminati Production and written by Morgenshtern. According to the rapper himself, the genre of this song is trap jazz. The song is dedicated to Alisher's return to promiscuous sexual relations after breaking up with Dilara.

== Background ==
In March 2022, Morgenstern got new tattoos, one of which turned out to be a tattoo of a flower and a gray microphone that jazz musicians sing into.

On April 5, 2022, Alisher announced on his Telegram channel that he would be releasing an "experimental" track within twenty-four hours, adding that he will teach his listeners "a new sound".

== Music video ==
The music video was released on the day of the single's release, April 26, 2022.

== Text ==
In the song, the rapper considers himself first in everything, "Yeah, I'm number one".

== Scores ==
Russian rap singer OG Buda called Alisher an "old man" and added that this is Morgenshtern's best track ever.

== Track listing ==
Information from Tidal

Digital distribution
No.	Title	Writer(s)	producer	Length
1.	"Номер"	Andrei Katikov, Morgenshtern	Illuminati Production	1:58
