= Komu eto nado? =

"Кому это надо?"

Single by Slava Marlow
- Language: Russian
- English title: Who needs this?
- Released: May 14, 2021
- Genre: Hip Hop
- Length: 1:42
- Label: Atlantic Records Russia
- Producer: Slava Marlow (himself)

"Who needs this?" (Russian: "Кому это надо?") is a song by Russian music producer and vlogger Slava Marlow, released on 14 May 2021 through the label Atlantic Records Russia.

== Background ==
On 6 February 2021, Artyom posted on Instagram a snippet of the upcoming song. On 14 May on the same account, there was a short video with a fragment of the song, along with a description saying that it was released.

== Reviews ==
InterMedia said that the artist "reflects" on the topic of the value of love and money.
