= Revelations (Thrill Pill album) =

Studio album by Thrill Pill
- Released: November 8, 2019
- Genre: Russian hip hop
- Length: 25:17
- Language: Russian
- Label: Warner Music Russia

Revelations (Russian: "Откровения", stylized as "ОТКРОВЕНИЯ") is the debut studio album by Russian hip hop singer Thrill Pill, released on 8 November 2019 through the label Warner Music Russia. The single "Грустная песня" was released to support the album, topping the charts on Apple Music, VK & Genius. A concert tour for the album took place in November & December 2019.

== Background ==
On 15 November 2018 on the "Узнать за 10 секунд" by the magazine Afisha, Thrill Pill said he was working on a second project following "Сам Дамб Щит, Vol 2", and would arrive presumably in March 2019.

On 14 August 2019 in his Instagram Stories, Thrill Pill stated that the album was 68% completed.

On 7 October 2019, Thrill Pill said that he finished working on the album. On 17 October, the track list for the album was released.

== Promotion ==
On 1 November 2019, A week before the album's release, the single "Грустная песня" was released along with a video for the song, собравший за неделю 10 million views and landed on the charts of Apple Music, VK, Genius, Yandex Music, Deezer & Shazam.

== Track listing ==
Откровения
No.	Title	Producers	Length
1.	"Откровения Интро"	BLΛCKTΛPE; Palette	1:57
2.	"Грустная песня" (feat. Egor Kreed & Morgenshtern)	Viramaina	3:46
3.	"Большие Бизнесмены"	FrozenGangBeatz	1:55
4.	"Из Моих Кошмаров" (feat. Thomas Mraz)	RedLightMuzik	2:51
5.	"Аристократ Флоу"	RedLightMuzik	2:18
6.	"Неуязвимым"	ПЛАМЛИ; СПОТИ; TokyoSZN; Reality Beats	2:02
7.	"Самарканд 2008"	СПОТИ	2:10
8.	"Станцуй Для Меня"	Kirill Magai	2:33
9.	"Завтра" (feat. ЛСП)	Gangan	2:58
10.	"Чужими"	СПОТИ; ПЛАМЛИ; FrozenGangBeatz	2:47
Total length:			25:17
