= I'm Drinking Again =

Single by Slava Marlow

from the EP Artyom
- Language: Russian
- Released: October 7, 2020
- Genre: Pop
- Length: 1:56
- Label: Zhara Music
- Songwriter: Slava Marlow
- Producer: Slava Marlow

"I'm Drinking Again" (Russian: "Снова я напиваюсь") is a song by Russian music producer and rap singer Slava Marlow, which became a hit. It was released on 7 October 2020 as the lead single from his debut EP, Artyom through the label Zhara Distribution. In the song, Slava Marlow sings about "empty pockets and girls, which is why they don't want to be with him."

== Music video ==
An animated video for the song was released through Slava Marlow's official YouTube channel, on the same day as the single was released. Within 24 hours, the video received 1.5 million views and landed on 13th place in the trending section on Russian-language YouTube. On 12 December 2020, the official music video was released. In the video, Slava Marlow walks down a street with a bottle, visits hot spots and rides on a bus. Within 24 hours, the video was viewed three million times and landed in the Top 5 of YouTube's "trending" section.

== Ratings ==
Year	Platform	Rating	Place	Ref.
2020	Spotify	Top-5 tracks	1	
2020	The Flow	50 best songs of 2020	10	
2021	Apple Music	Top-10 tracks	2	
