= Samedov =

Samedov (Azerbaijani: Səmədov, Russian: Саме́дов) is an Azerbaijani surname. Notable people with the surname include:

- Aleksandr Samedov (born 1984), Russian footballer
- Alihan Samedov (born 1964), Soviet and Azerbaijani musician
- Thrill Pill, stage name of Timur Tofikovich Samedov (born 2000), Russian rapper
- Zabit Samedov (born 1984), Azerbaijani kickboxer
