= Viperr =

Former Russian rap duo

- Genres: Hip hop; trap; Alternative hip-hop; rage
- Years active: 2022-2025
- Label: Koala Music
- Past members: Dmitry Olegovich Itskov (Russian: Дмитрий Олегович Ицков) (aka Kai Angel; Кай Э́нджел); Sergey Igorevich Dmitriev (Russian: Сергей Игоревич Дмитриев) (aka 9mice; На́йн Ма́йс)

Viperr (Russian: Ва́йперр), also known as Kai Angel & 9mice (Russian. Кай Э́нджел и На́йн Ма́йс) were a Russian-speaking rap-duet, based in the United States.

== Biography of the Members ==
=== Kai Angel ===
Dmitry Olegovich Itskov (Russian: Дмитрий Олегович Ицков) was born on 4 February 1997. He grew up in Israel.

=== 9mice ===
Sergey Igorevich Dmitriev (Russian: Сергей Игоревич Дмитриев) was born on 27 August 2000.

== History of the duo ==
In December 2023, Kai Angel and 9mice, together with actor Yaroslav Mogilnikov, presented new merch to Kanye West, created by Gosha Rubchinskiy.

In 2024, the duo released a sequel, the album Heavy Metal 2. That same year, the duo was nominated for the list "30 of 30" of the journal Forbes.

In May 2025, the band announced their breakup due to internal conflicts.

== Ratings ==
Year	Journal	Nomination	Results	Ref.
2023	The Flow	"50 best albums of 2023"	27th place (Note: For the album Heavy Metal.)	
2023	"Звук Медиа"	"Top 10 best Russian rappers from the old and new schools"	2nd place	
2024	"Afisha Daily"	"17 best music videos of 2023"	13th place (Note: For the music video to the single Lipstick.)	
2024	Forbes	"30 of 30: Music"	Nominated	
2024	The Flow	"50 best albums of 2024"	14th place (Note: For the album Heavy Metal 2.)	

== Discography ==
Studio Albums

Year	Title
2023	Heavy Metal
2024	Heavy Metal 2

Album Guest

Year	Title	Other singers	Album
2023	Spray	Aarne	AA Language 2
2024	Hell	Egor Kreed	"Меньше чем три"
