= Tuzik =

2022 studio album by Slava Marlow

Studio album by Slava Marlow
- Released: December 16, 2022
- Genres: Hip hop; Rap rock; Alternative Rap; electronic rock
- Length: 17:18
- Language: Russian
- Producer: Slava Marlow

"Tuzik" (Russian: "Ту́зик") is the third album by Slava Marlow, released on 16 December 2022. The release marks a new stage in the artist's musical career.

== Description ==
Work on the album took a long time. According to Slava, he managed to delete three other albums while working on it. With this album, Slava puts an end to the past period and began a new one.

== Music videos ==
=== "O2" ===
The music video for the track "O2" was released on February 18, 2023. The video was created in abstract tones, which are not typical for Marlow, just like the song itself, which was written about panic attacks and fear.

== Reviews ==
The newspaper Meduza wrote, that with this album, Slava Marlow reimagined the genre and made it sharper, harsher, and more cutting. Furthermore, the author of the article noted that the work surprised not so much with its lyrics, as is typical with most rap artists, but with its sound. In the author's words, "completely wild, abrasive and beyond all possible limits."

== List of compositions ==
Information per Spotify.
No.	Title	Writer(s)	Length
1.	"Интро"	Artyom Artyomovich Gotlieb	2:16
2.	"Я в деле"	Gotlieb	1:33
3.	"Я потерялся"	Gotlieb	1:29
4.	"Каблуки"	Gotlieb; Artur Ravilevich Sadykov	1:41
5.	"Лиза"	Gotlieb	1:47
6.	"Ровер"	Gotlieb	1:53
7.	"О2"	Gotlieb	1:56
8.	"Забуду"	Gotlieb	2:05
9.	"Детские травмы" (featuring Platina and Larry Mayak)	Gotlieb; Robert Plaudis; Valeriya Sergeevna Ablayeva	2:40
Total length:			17:18
