= Ulybnis, durak! =

Studio album by Morgenshtern
- Released: 1 January 2019
- Genre: Hip-hop
- Length: 21:17
- Language: Russian
- Label: Yoola Music

Morgenshtern chronology
Do togo kak stal izvesten (2018)	Ulybnis, durak! (2019)	Legendary Dust (2020)

Ulybnis, durak! is the second studio album by Russian video blogger and rap singer Morgenshtern, released on January 1, 2019.

== Background ==
The previous album by Morgenshtern, Do togo kak stal izvesten, was the premise for the album Ulybnis, durak!. According to Alisher, the first tracks for this album were recorded in mid-2018, but he was not well known at the time and the decision was made to do a series of performances in order for the album to reach a wider audience.

== History ==
The album was announced on December 24, 2018, in a video by Morgenstern on his personal YouTube-channel, and the main release took place on January 1, 2019 (on other streaming platforms a couple of days later). The record consists of seven tracks, three of which are tracks with the participation of rapper and friend of Alisher - 4Teen, video blogger Dmitri Larin and LSP.

== Track listing ==
No.	Title	Продюсер	Length
1.	"Улыбнись, дурак!"	Morgenshtern	1:15
2.	"Буду твоей пальмой!"	4Teen · Morgenshtern	3:14
3.	"So High!" (in conjunction with 4Teen)	4Teen	3:05
4.	"Пам Пам Пам!"	4Teen	2:22
5.	"Вечный сон" (together with Larins)	Morgenshtern	3:25
6.	"Первый раз"	Morgenshtern	4:31
7.	"Green-eyed chicks!" (together with LSP)	4Teen · Morgenshtern	3:25
Total length:			21:17
