= 12 (song) =

2022 single by Morgenshtern

Single by Morgenshtern
- Released: 14 March 2022
- Genre: Hip hop
- Length: 3:00
- Label: Independent
- Songwriters: Alisher Morgenshtern; Vladislav Palagin
- Producer: Palagin

Morgenshtern singles chronology
"Pochemu?" (2022)	"12" (2022)	"Selyavi" (2022)

Music video
- "12" on YouTube

"12" is a 2022 single by Russian rap artist Morgenshtern. The song was released on 14 March 2022 on social media platform Telegram after several unsuccessful attempts to release "12" on streaming platforms.

== Background ==
"12" is dedicated to Morgenshtern's younger brother. In addition, the song is named in honor of Morgenshtern's younger brother's birthday, who had turned 12 on 14 March 2022. The song also speaks about the 2022 Russian invasion of Ukraine, calling for peace and friendship between Russia and Ukraine, while also condemning the actions of Russia from the invasion.

== Composition ==
The song starts off with words from Dmitry Gordon, a Ukrainian journalist, saying "get the fuck out of here, fucking motherfuckers!" The song talks numerous situations, including the economic collapse of the ruble, the 2022 Russian invasion of Ukraine and Morgenshtern's own problems with the law. During the chorus, Morgenshtern condemns Russian generals bringing Russian soldiers to the frontlines of the war, saying "Big bosses will send [you] to the slaughterhouse, [and] bosses never give a fuck'. At the end of the song, a voice recording with a woman, who is later revealed as Ukrainian producer Vladislav Palagin's mother, speaks that she is safe in a bomb shelter after a bombing raid. In the music video, the video ends with the caption "He is Ukrainian, I am Russian. We make music together. We want peace. We want friendship."
