= New Wave (song) =

"Новая волна"

Single by DJ Smash feat. Morgenshtern
- Language: Russian
- English title: New Wave
- Released: April 2, 2021
- Genre: Pop; Mumble Rap
- Length: 2:39

"New Wave" (Russian: "Новая волна") is a song by Russian DJ DJ Smash & Russian rap-singer Morgenshtern, released on 2 April 2021 through the labels Shirman, Morgenshtern & Mansion. The song is a new version of DJ Smash's single "Волна" from 2008.

== History ==
In 2008, DJ Smash released the single "Волна" alongside a music video for it, featuring Fast Food and Lyudmila Sokolov. A new version of the song, "Новая волна", was released on 2 April 2021, alongside a new music video. The single features singer Morgenshtern. «I grew up on this Wave, and now you will grow on the New Wave», wrote Morgenshtern on Instagram.

== Music video ==
The music video was released on 2 April 2021, the same day the track was released. The director was Alexander Romanov. In it, DJ Smash appears as a Catholic priest, while Morgenshtern appears as the Pope. The plot of the video is that a meteor files to Earth, and with the end of the world expected, people go to church to party one last time.

On 6 April 2021, the deputy of the State Duma from the CPRF, Chairman of the State Duma Committee for the Development of Civil Society, issues of public and religious associations Sergei Gavrilov filed a complaint to the prosecutor's office about a music video for extremism, alongside a complaint to Roskomnadzor asking that the music video be blocked.
