= Leck (song) =

2021 single by Morgenshtern, Imanbek & Fetty Wap

Single by Morgenshtern feat. Imanbek & Fetty Wap
- Language: English, Russian
- Released: April 30, 2021
- Genre: Hip-Hop; Rap
- Length: 2:31

"Leck" is a song by rap singers Morgenshtern, Imanbek & Fetty Wap, released on 30 April 2021 as a single through the label Effective Records and produced by Imanbek himself & beatmaker Tzukush. The first version of "Leck," which did not include Morgenshtern's part, was released in December 2020 as a remake to the song "Leak" by artists Shahar Saul & Tzukush.

== History ==
On 4 December 2020, at the initiative of KDDK, heads of the label Effective Records, & Kazakh producer Imanbek, a remaster of the composition of Israeli singers Shahar Saul & Tzukush "Leak" was released. American rapper Fetty Wap was invited to write and participate on the song.

On 30 April 2021, a new version of «Leck» was released, this time featuring Morgenshtern and a bridge, performed to the tune of "Kalinka," a Russian song written by Ivan Petrovich Larionov. The first version of the song was removed from streaming services in Russian territory.
