= DJ Smash =

Russian DJ (born 1982)

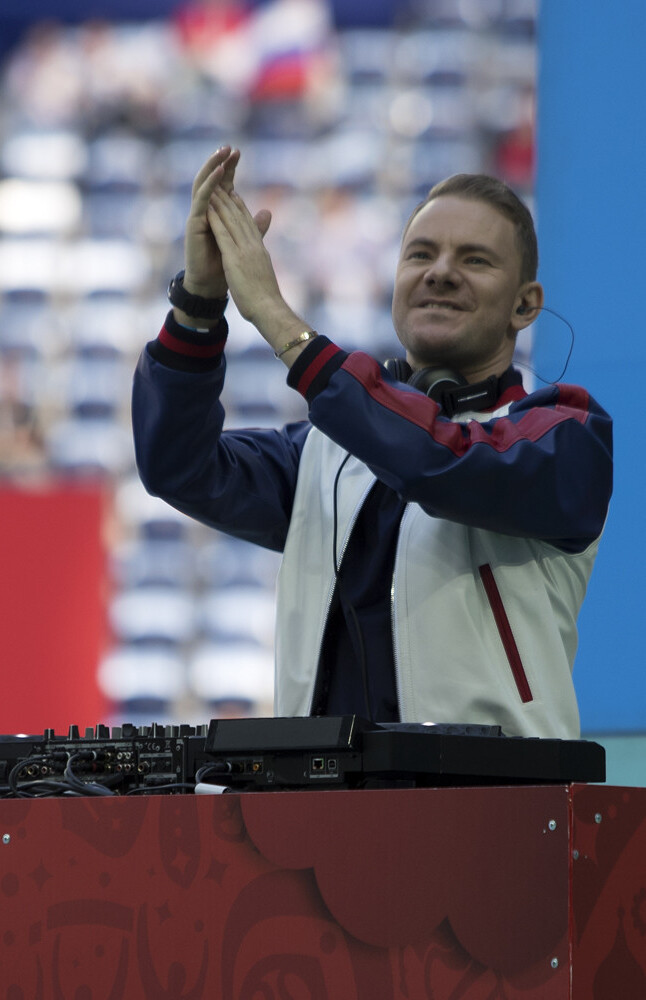
- DJ Smash in June 2017

Background information
- Born: Andrey Leonidovich Shirman; May 23, 1982 (age 44); Perm, Russian SFSR, Soviet Union
- Origin: Perm
- Genres: Electronic music, house
- Occupations: DJ, music producer
- Instruments: Piano, DAWs (Digital Audio Workstations), Samplers, Dj equipment, MIDI controllers, Drum machines, Synthesizers.
- Years active: 1996–present
- Labels: Sowa Music, Velvet Music
- Website: djsmash.ru

Andrey Leonidovich Shirman (Russian: Андрей Леонидович Ширман; born 23 May 1982), known professionally as DJ Smash, is a Russian DJ in house music and electronic music, and also a music producer. As of 2022, he is one of the most popular musical stars in Russia. DJ Smash was awarded Best New Act in 2008 at the MTV Russia Music Awards.

== Biography ==
DJ Smash was born in 1982 in Perm, Russia, and started making music at an early age. In 2006 he released the single "Moscow Never Sleeps", which became a hit, and brought him to wide attention. In 2008 at MTV Russian Music Awards, DJ Smash received nominations for “Debut of the Year” and “Best Dance Album”.

During the 2018 presidential elections, he became a member of the Putin Team movement, which supported Vladimir Putin, and became the author of the "Guiding Star" anthem.

Every year from 2007, Smash has produced several hit songs, including collaborations with other artists, which have enjoyed popularity across Russia, former Soviet Union countries, and beyond.

== Discography ==
=== Studio albums ===
- IDDQD (2008)
- Twenty Three (2011)
- Новый мир (New world) (2012)
- Star Tracks (2014)
- Smash World (2017)

=== Singles ===
- Moscow Never Sleeps (feat. Fast Food) (2007)
- Moscow Never Sleeps (feat. Timati & Fast Food) (2008)
- 2008 — Волна (Wave) (vocals: Lyudmila Sokolova)
- 2009 — Moscow Wait For February
- 2009 — The Best Song
- 2009 — Between The Earth And The Sky (feat. Shahzoda)
- 2010 — Airplane (feat. Fast Food)
- 2010 — Птица (Bird)
- 2010 — From Russia With Love
- 2011 — Without Words
- 2011 — Tricks (feat. Timati)
- 2011 — Rendez-vous (feat. Mauri)
- 2011 — Lifemission (feat. ChinKong)
- 2012 — Moscow (feat. Vintage)
- 2012 — Young Hearts
- 2012 — Jump (feat. T-Moor Rodriguez)
- 2012 — Long Distance Love (feat. Vera Brezhneva)
- 2012 — Only Forward (feat. DJ Vengerov)
- 2013 — New World (feat. Natalia Podolskaya)
- 2013 — Good Time (feat. Craig David)
- 2013 — Stop the Time
- 2013 — 3 Wishes (feat. Vintage)
- 2014 — BREAK IT (feat. Ch.Armstrong)
- 2014 — Rapture
- 2014 — The Edge (feat. Levingstone)
- 2014 — The Renegades (feat. Tara McDonald)
- 2015 — The Night Is Young (feat. Ridley)
- 2015 — Lovers 2 Lovers (feat. Ridley)
- 2016 — Dark Alleys (feat. Moya Michelle)
- 2020 — Begi (feat. Royot)
- 2020 — Puding (feat. NE Grishkovets)
- 2020 — Vesna u okna (feat. NE Grishkovets)
- 2021 — New Wave (with Morgenshtern)
- 2021 — Po Mozgam (feat. Royot and T-Fest)
- 2021 — Tikhi Gimn (feat. Karna.val)
- 2022 — ATML (feat. Royot)
- 2024 — CO2 (feat. Artik & Asti)

=== Video clips ===
- 2007 — Moscow Never Sleeps (feat. Fast Food)
- 2008 — Moscow Never Sleeps (feat. Timati & Fast Food)
- 2008 — Pasha — Face Control (feat. Diskoteka Avariya)
- 2008 — Волна (Wave) (vocals: Lyudmila Sokolova)
- 2010 — The Best Song
- 2010 — Between The Earth And The Sky (feat. Shahzoda)
- 2011 — Airplane
- 2011 — Tricks (feat. Timati & Fast Food)
- 2012 — From Russia With Love
- 2012 — Птица (Bird)
- 2012 — Rendez-Vous (feat. Mauri)
- 2012 — Without Words
- 2012 — Na Zare (feat. Aleksey Rizhov & ChinKong & DJ Abssent)
- 2012 — Moscow (feat. Vintage)
- 2012 — Young Hearts
- 2012 — Saturday (feat. MMDANCE)
- 2012 — Jump (feat. T-Moor Rodriguez)
- 2012 — Long Distance Love (feat. Vera Brezhneva)
- 2012 — Only Forward (feat. DJ Vengerov)
- 2013 — Откат (feat. Семён Слепаков)
- 2013 — Angels (feat. DJ Miller & Anya)
- 2013 — New World (feat. Natalia Podolskaya)
- 2013 — Oil (feat. Vengerov & Bobina feat. Matuya & Averin & Kravets
- 2013 — Stop The Time
- 2013 — 3 Wishes (feat. Vintage)
- 2014 — Break It (feat. Charlie Armstrong)
- 2014 — Rapture
- 2014 — The Edge
- 2015 — The Night Is Young (feat. Ridley)
- 2015 — Lovers 2 Lovers (feat. Ridley)
- 2016 — Dark Alleys (feat. Moya Michelle)
- 2017 — Команда 2018 (feat. Polina Gagarina & Egor Kreed)

== Awards ==
- 2008 — Golden Gramophone Award
