= Rozovoye vino =

2017 single by Eldzhey and Feduk

Single by Eldzhey and Feduk
- Released: 4 August 2017
- Recorded: 2017
- Genre: Hip-hop, Pop, Deep house, Hip house
- Length: 4:06
- Label: ZBV, Warner Music Russia
- Songwriters: Alexey Konstantinovich Uzenyuk, Fyodor Andreevich Insarov
- Producer: Valentin Filatov

Eldzhey singles chronology
| "Ul'tramarinovyye tantsy" (2017) | "Rozovoye vino" (2017) | "Hey, Guys" (2017) |

Feduk singles chronology
| "Moskva" (2015) | "Rozovoye vino" (2017) | "Groove" (2017) |

Music video
- "Rozovoye vino" on YouTube

"Rozovoye vino" (Russian: Розовое вино, lit. 'Rose wine') is a song by Russian rappers Eldzhey and Feduk. It was released through labels ZBV and Warner Music Russia on August 4, 2017. The song was commercially successful in the countries of former Soviet Union and Poland.

It was given the RU.TV award for best debut and was nominated for both the Muz-TV award for song of the year and the Russian National Music Award for dance hit of the year.

== Composition ==
Rozovoe vino is a song with a hip house sound and is based on a beat made by Valentin Filatov, aka Empaldo Beats, which was created over the course of a quarter of an hour. However, the producer stated that he had relinquished the rights to the aforementioned song and other compositions intended for Eldzhey himself.

== Music video ==
The music video, directed by Alina Pasok and shot in Malaysia, was published on November 14, 2017.

== Commercial performance ==
In Russia, the song was placed among the top ten of the most popular songs by Russian artists in 2017 according to Yandex Music users. "Rozovoye vino" was named the winner of the VK Music Awards, becoming the most listened to song (more than 200 million times) in 2017 on the social network VK.

In Poland, the song went viral year after its release. Maciej Grzenkowicz, journalist for Polish newspaper Gazeta Wyborcza stated in the article that the song has become the biggest Russian-language hit in Poland since "Nas ne dogonyat" recorded by the Russian band t.A.T.u. in 2001.

"Rozovoye vino" debuted at the 89th position on the Polish airplay chart based on radio data for the week of 23 June to 29 June 2018. The following week it climbed up to 57th place and later peaked at 18th. Thanks to the 10 000 units sold on Polish territory, it was certified gold by Polish Society of the Phonographic Industry on October 24, 2018. It was also among the seven songs with the most streams accumulated on Polish territory during the year of 2018 on Spotify.

== Charts ==
=== Weekly charts ===
2017 weekly chart performance for "Rozovoye vino"
| Chart (2017) | Peak position |
|---|---|
| Belarus Airplay (Eurofest) | 22 |
| CIS Airplay (TopHit) | 13 |
| Russia Airplay (TopHit) | 12 |
| Ukraine Airplay (TopHit) | 148 |

2018 weekly chart performance for "Rozovoye vino"
| Chart (2018) | Peak position |
|---|---|
| CIS Airplay (TopHit) | 23 |
| Latvia Streaming (DigiTop100) | 3 |
| Poland (Polish Airplay Top 100) | 18 |
| Poland (Polish TV Airplay) | 2 |
| Poland (Dance Top 50) | 6 |
| Russia Airplay (TopHit) | 21 |
| Ukraine Airplay (TopHit) | 181 |

2019 weekly chart performance for "Rozovoye vino"
| Chart (2019) | Peak position |
|---|---|
| CIS Airplay (TopHit) | 137 |
| Poland (Polish Airplay Top 100) | 51 |
| Russia Airplay (TopHit) | 145 |
| Ukraine Airplay (TopHit) | 114 |

2020 weekly chart performance for "Rozovoye vino"
| Chart (2020) | Peak position |
|---|---|
| Ukraine Airplay (TopHit) | 139 |

2023 weekly chart performance for "Rozovoye vino"
| Chart (2023) | Peak position |
|---|---|
| Latvia Airplay (TopHit) | 103 |
| Lithuania Airplay (TopHit) | 191 |
| Moldova Airplay (TopHit) | 115 |

2024 weekly chart performance for "Rozovoye vino"
| Chart (2024) | Peak position |
|---|---|
| Moldova Airplay (TopHit) | 61 |

2025 weekly chart performance for "Rozovoye vino"
| Chart (2025) | Peak position |
|---|---|
| Moldova Airplay (TopHit) | 48 |

=== Monthly charts ===
2017 monthly chart performance for "Rozovoye vino"
| Chart (2017) | Peak position |
|---|---|
| CIS Airplay (TopHit) | 16 |
| Russia Airplay (TopHit) | 15 |

2018 monthly chart performance for "Rozovoye vino"
| Chart (2018) | Peak position |
|---|---|
| CIS Airplay (TopHit) | 44 |
| Russia Airplay (TopHit) | 41 |

2024 monthly chart performance for "Rozovoye vino"
| Chart (2024) | Peak position |
|---|---|
| Moldova Airplay (TopHit) | 93 |

=== Year-end charts ===
2017 year-end chart performance for "Rozovoye vino"
| Chart (2017) | Position |
|---|---|
| CIS Airplay (TopHit) | 90 |
| Russia Airplay (TopHit) | 85 |

2018 year-end chart performance for "Rozovoye vino"
| Chart (2018) | Position |
|---|---|
| Estonia (Eesti Tipp-40) | 35 |
| CIS Airplay (TopHit) | 106 |
| Russia Airplay (TopHit) | 98 |

2024 year-end chart performance for "Rozovoye vino"
| Chart (2024) | Position |
|---|---|
| Moldova Airplay (TopHit) | 116 |

2025 year-end chart performance for "Rozovoye vino"
| Chart (2025) | Position |
|---|---|
| Moldova Airplay (TopHit) | 151 |

=== Decade-end charts ===
20s decade-end chart performance for "Rozovoye vino"
| Chart (2020–2025) | Position |
|---|---|
| Latvia Airplay (TopHit) | 61 |
| Moldova Airplay (TopHit) | 38 |

== Certifications ==
| Region | Certification | Certified units/sales |
|---|---|---|
| Poland (ZPAV) | Gold | 10,000^{‡} |
^{‡} Sales+streaming figures based on certification alone.

== Cover versions ==
In December 2024, Russian singer Philipp Kirkorov released a cover of the song, titled "Fioletovaya vata". The song received an award in category Best cover version at Premya Muz-TV 2025.
