= Alisher (EP) =

EP by Morgenshtern
- Released: 14 February 2025
- Genre: Rock
- Length: 12:54
- Language: Russian
- Label: Believe Digital

Morgenshtern chronology
| Golden Hits, Vol. 2 (2023) | Alisher (2025) |

Alisher is the second mini-album by Morgenshtern, released 14 February 2025. The EP contains five tracks with a total duration of 12 minutes and 54 seconds. In this release, the artist continues to develop the course on the genre of Russian rock, set in motion by the success of the single "Last Love".

== Background ==
On 30 December 2024, Morgenstern shared a post on his Telegram channel in which he recounted a challenging period of his life marked by his struggle with bipolar disorder, difficult relationships with loved ones, and deep depression. This explained his prolonged absence from the public eye.

On 1 February 2025, during a live broadcast from a rehab centre, the artist announced the release of an EP featuring five tracks reflecting the difficulties in his life.

== Description ==
Recorded prior to treatment, the album reflects the difficult period of Alisher's life leading up to rehabilitation. The musician conducts a deep self-reflection, analysing the psychotic episode he experienced, his separation from his homeland and family, his immersion in depression and the illusory world of "false high". The album shows the process of the artist's inner transformation, his attempts to make sense of what happened and learn to live again. The title of the release emphasises that the listener does not see Morgenstern's stage image, but the story of a real person - Alisher.

The guitar parts were recorded in Georgia with the participation of a group of musicians, while the vocals were recorded in different studios around the world during the three months the artist spent in depression. The mixing and mastering was done by Podlesny Twins. The album was finalised by Morgenstern in a rehabilitation centre in Israel, in the attic of a building.

== Tracklist ==
Adapted for Yandex Music.
| No. | Title | Writer(s) | Length |
|---|---|---|---|
| 1. | "Красный флаг" ("Red Flag") | Alisher Morgenshtern; Andrei Katikov | 2:26 |
| 2. | "Дом (Лондон, Прага, Ницца)" ("Home (London, Prague, Nice)") | Morgenshtern; Katikov | 2:33 |
| 3. | "Повод" ("Cause") | Morgenshtern; Katikov | 2:33 |
| 4. | "Антидепрессанты" ("Antidepressants") | Morgenshtern; Katikov | 2:32 |
| 5. | "Пустой вокзал" ("Empty Train Station") | Morgenshtern; Katikov | 2:50 |
| Total length: | | | 12:54 |

=== Notes ===
- All song titles are stylised to majuscule, except for track #2, which is originally titled ‘HOME (London, Prague, Nice)’.

== Reviews and ratings ==
Alexei Mazhayev of InterMedia describes Alisher as an unexpectedly mature and melodic release from Morgenshtern. Released shortly after the artist entered rehab, the mini-album went straight to the charts, with streaming services categorising its style as Russian rock. According to Mazhaev, the lyrics are "heartfelt and frank to a much greater extent than the current songs of the majority of Rusrock maestros", and the rhymes are apt and aphoristic. Morgenstern's vocals, especially in the chorus of the most successful track "The Reason", remind of Viktor Tsoi, although, as the reviewer notes, the leader of Kino would hardly end the line with the sounds of "nya-nya-nya-nya-nya-nya".
