= Sayonara detka =

2019 song by Eldzhey and Era Istrefi

Song by Eldzhey feat. Era Istrefi
- Language: English, Russian
- Released: June 20, 2019
- Genre: Pop-rap
- Length: 2:44

Sayonara детка is a song by Russian hip-hop-singer Eldzhey featuring Kosovar singer Era Istrefi, released on 20 June 2019 on Effective Records.

== Music video ==
Medet Shayakhmetov directed the music video, which was released on 15 August 2019.

== Awards and nominations ==
Year	Award	Category	Results	Refs.
2020	Новое Радио Awards 2020	Best Collaboration	Nominated	

== List of tracks ==
Digital download

No.	Title	Length
1.	"Sayonara детка" (feat. Era Istrefi)	2:44

Digital download — Rompasso Remix

No.	Title	Length
1.	"Sayonara детка" (feat. Era Istrefi) (Rompasso Remix)	3:13

== Charts ==
=== Monthly charts ===
Chart (2020)	Highest position
Latvia (LaIPA)	31
Lithuania (AGATA)	76
Russia (Tophit)	7

=== Yearly charts ===
Chart (2020)	Highest position
Latvia (LaIPA)	90
Russia (Tophit)	70
