= Rauf & Faik =

Azerbaijani trap duet

Rauf & Faik Рауф и Фаик
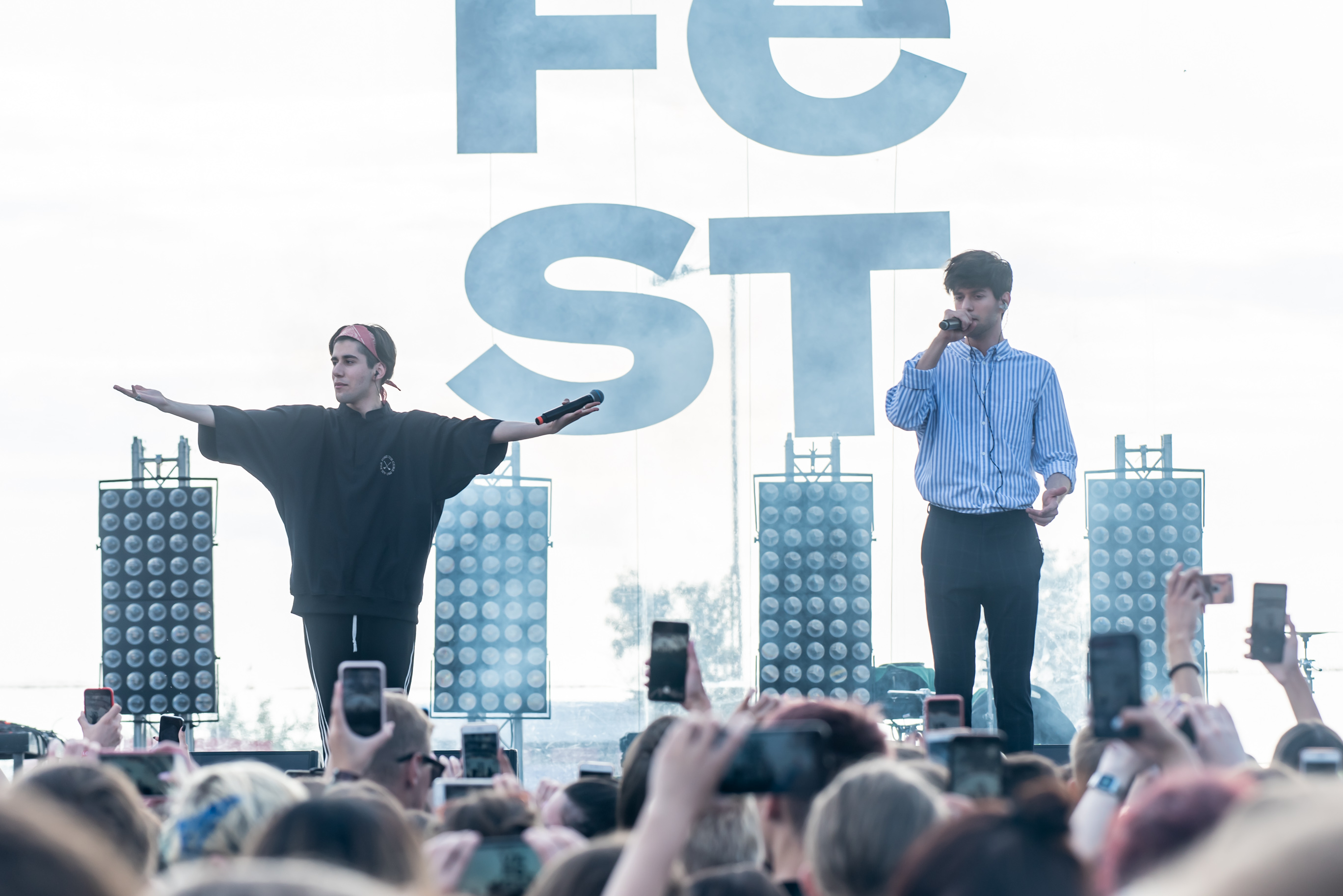
- Rauf & Faik live at VK Fest 5 in St. Petersburg, Russia

Background information
- Born: July 7, 1999 (age 27); Izhevsk, Russia
- Origin: Baku, Azerbaijan
- Genres: Pop, R&B, trap
- Occupations: Musician, Composer, Music Arranger, Songwriter, Record producer
- Instruments: Guitar, Piano
- Years active: 2015 - Present
- Label: Atlantic Records Russia (under exclusive license from Warner Music Group)
- Members: Rauf Mirzaev Faik Mirzaev (az. Mirzəyev)
- Website: https://youtube.com/@rauf_faik

Rauf & Faik (Рауф и Фаик) are a Russian trap duet of Azerbaijani origins, formed by twin brothers Rauf and Faik Mirzaev (Russian: Рауф и Фаик Мирзаевы; born July 7, 1999, Izhevsk, Russia). Their debut song is "вечера". They are best known for their Russian language No. 1 single "Childhood" (Russian: Детство), released in 2018. They release music sung in both Russian and English. They usually associate themselves with R&B and emo-rap grooves.

== Biography ==
The brothers are ethnically Azerbaijani. According to the brothers, they have always had a fascination with music, as they inherited musical talent from their maternal grandfather, who they knew as an opera singer and a director at an opera house in Baku. They began to study music at the age of 4; their neighbour saw that they were talented and offered to take them to a music-focused college, where they played the piano until 8 years old, where they transitioned to vocals. They later sung with the House of Children's Creativity (Russian: Доме детского творчества) and music studio Above the Rainbow (Russian: Выше радуги). According to the channel "Music First" (Russian: Музыки первого) their vocal range is 4 1/2 octaves.

They grew up listening to 90s Soul, R&B, and Pop and music, citing Brian McKnight and Michael Jackson. More recently, they have commented on receiving inspiration from western artists such as XXXTentacion, who they consider very inspiring, and to a lesser degree, Post Malone; though their profile on Music First also lists Sam Smith. XXXTentacion, according to Faik, means a lot to them and very inspiring. At the beginning of ”Detstvo” music video, a Tupac Shakur reference is seen. Before focusing entirely on music (2014-2018), they worked as singers in a cafe. They are both Muslims. Rauf & Faik released the single "Ramadan" in 2021.

== Music ==
Their first music video — released for the song "Evenings" (Russian: Вечера) — amassed several hundred thousand views, and thousands of likes, resulting in offers to sing at multiple venues. A later music video for the song "I Love You" (Russian: Я люблю тебя), became the 28th most popular song of 2018 on the Russian social networking site VKontakte.

Their debut album, also titled "Ya Lyublyu Tebya”, was released later in September, 2018. According to the brothers, they invested only 1,500 Rubles (approx. $25) into advertising the album. Despite little inherent publicity, the song "Childhood" (Russian: Детство) reached number one on VKontakte.

"Pain & Memories", their second studio album, released on March 15, 2019, and quickly reached 8th place on Apple Music.

Since beginning their professional music career, the brothers have toured in over 20 Russian cities, Estonia, Finland, Sweden, and Germany.

== Discography ==
=== Album ===
Name	Information	Notes
Я люблю тебя	Released: September 28, 2018; Format: digital distribution	* song list: No. / Title / Length; 1. / "Что между нами"; 2. / "Мосты"; 3. / "Апрель (feat. Интакто)"; 4. / "Было бы лето"; 5. / "Вечера"; 6. / "Где моя любимая"; 7. / "Голубые глаза"; 8. / "Наркотики и алкоголь (feat. Интакто)"; 9. / "Детство"; 10. / "Просто друг мой"; 11. / "Мама"; 12. / "Скажи мне как ты любишь меня"; 13. / "5 минут"; 14. / "Солнце"; 15. / "Я огонь ты вода"; 16. / "Которую любишь"; 17. / "Я люблю тебя"
Pain & Memories	Released: March 15, 2019; Format: digital distribution	* song list: No. / Title / Length; 1. / "OLA"; 2. / "Где солнца нет"; 3. / "Любишь и не любишь"; 4. / "My Pain My Pain"; 5. / "Не так красива"; 6. / "Метро"; 7. / "Lonely (feat. Foreign Vill)"; 8. / "Вальс"; 9. / "Что такое любовь?"; 10. / "Моя звезда"; 11. / "Из-за тебя"; 12. / "Просто любовь"; 13. / "Извини меня"
Youth I	Released: August 19, 2021; Format: digital distribution	* song list: No. / Title / Length; 1. / "Dream about.."; 2. / "Goodbye"; 3. / "Несутся часы счастливые (feat. Lyolya)"; 4. / "Вотсап"; 5. / "Где же ты была"; 6. / "Delete"; 7. / "Унесённые ветрами"; 8. / "Lola"; 9. / "Карнавал"; 10. / "Money Money"; 11. / "Случайная любовь"; 12. / "Самолёт (feat. Интакто)"
Youth II	Released: July 8, 2022; Format: digital distribution	* song list: No. / Title / Length; 1. / "Время летит"; 2. / "Дракон на воле"; 3. / "Первый поцелуй"; 4. / "Кусочек пиццы"; 5. / "Там, где мы с тобой"; 6. / "Она звонила мне"; 7. / "This game (feat. Интакто)"; 8. / "Навсегда"; 9. / "Ошибка"; 10. / "Бутафория"; 11. / "Горит душа"

=== Single ===
Year	Title	Table		
Year	Title	Commonwealth of Independent States		
Year	Title	Top Hit Top Radio & YouTube Hits	Top Hit & Top Radio Hits	Top Hit & Top YouTube Hits
2015	Love remained yesterday			
2017	Не нужны мне слова	—	—	—
2018	Ego			
2018	Я люблю тебя	—	—	—
2018	Апрель (feat. Интакто)			
2018	Было бы лето			
2018	Детство	54	861	13
2018	Детство - Amice Remix (Melali Beats)			
2019	Из-за тебя			
2019	OLA (feat. Никита N.B)			
2019	Это ли счастье?			
2019	Между строк			
2019	Моя			
2019	Скандалы			
2019	Я люблю тебя давно			
2019	Колыбельная			
2020	Australia			
2020	Wonderful			
2020	Деньги и счастье			
2020	Закат и рассвет			
2020	Если тебе будет грустно (feat. Niletto)			
2020	Угадай где я? (closing song Dani Milokhin and Artur Babich)			
2020	Запомни, I love you (feat Shami)			
2020	Тебя нет со мной (feat. TOXi$)			
2021	Школа берёзка			
2021	Засыпай спокойно, страна (feat. Bahh Tee)			
2021	Can't Buy Me Loving / La-La-La			
2021	Ramadan			
2021	Унесённые ветрами			
2021	Там, где мы с тобой			
2022	Rubicon			
2022	LUV			
2022	17 лет (feat. Джарахов)			
2022	Супергерой (feat. Bahh Tee)			
2022	ALONE AGAIN			
2022	Memories			
2022	Animal			
2023	ДОМ			
2023	Gotham			
2023	Апокалипсис			
2023	Perfume			
2024	Так много слов			
2024	fly			
2024	Mistake			
2024	Follow me			
2024	Самая			
2024	Sabr			
2025	Wild flame			
2025	Море			
2025	5 минут (Feat. BAbyBoi)			
2025	Улыбаться			
2026	My Tender Girl			
2026	LET IT BE			
2026	summer of '26			
2026	Homebound			
