= Hate Me (EP) =

EP by Morgenshtern
- Released: 17 February 2018
- Genres: Hip-hop; rap
- Length: 15:00
- Language: Russian
- Labels: Yoola Music (formerly), Rhymes Music

Morgenshtern chronology
Hate Me (2018)	Do togo kak stal izvesten (2018)

Hate Me is a mini-album by Russian rapper and blogger Morgenshtern. It was released on February 17, 2018, his birthday, on the Yoola Music label and was produced by Morgenstern himself. Along with the release of the mini-album, a tour called the RIP Morgenstern Tour was conducted.

== History ==
On February 6, 2018, Morgenstern released an improved version of the song “Hermit” from the mini-album Happy B-Day, released on July 1, 2017, by Alisher under the pseudonym 1 July.

On February 17, 2018, the day of the mini-album's release, he released a music video for the tracks “Dikiy” and “Insomnia”. The clip features two incarnations of Morgenstern: the entertainer and the creator.

On November 16, 2018, Morgenstern released a music video for the song “Uff... Dengi...” in which, according to Morgenshtern, he finally buries his old image and appears without his dreadlocks for the first time.

== Track listing ==
All tracks are written by Morgenshtern.

Information taken from the music service Apple Music
No.	Title	Length
1.	"Дикий"	1:22
2.	"Insomnia"	2:28
3.	"Fuck ’Em All"	2:23
4.	"Hermit"	2:19
5.	"Уфф… Деньги…"	3:08
6.	"Виски на завтрак"	3:20
Total length:		15:00
