= If you feel sad (song) =

"Если тебе будет грустно"

Single by Rauf & Faik feat. Niletto
- Language: Russian
- English title: If you feel sad
- Released: September 3, 2020
- Genre: Pop
- Length: 3:12
- Label: Zion Music

If you feel sad (Russian: «Если тебе будет грустно») is a song by Russian musical duo Rauf & Faik & Russian singer Niletto, released on 3 September 2020 as a single through the label Zion Music.

== History ==
On 19 November 2020, the track was discussed on the music show "Musicality."

== Music video ==
On 3 September 2020, the day of the single's release, a mood video for the song was released. It was filmed in one of the skateparks in Izhevsk. On 2 December of that year, the full length video was published on Niletto's official YouTube channel. The plot of the video involves the meeting of musicians in an apartment, where they do a photoshoot with guns. As a result, this was arranged, in order to "please mom."

== Nominations ==
Award	Year	Category	Ref.
Новое Радио Awards	2021	"Best Collaboration"	
Жара Music Awards	2021	"Internet-Hit"	
