= Moscow Never Sleeps =

"Moscow Never Sleep"

Single by DJ Smash

from the album IDDQD
- Released: October 31, 2007
- Genre: Electronic
- Length: 3:54
- Label: Houseworks
- Producer: DJ Smash

"Moscow Never Sleeps" (Russian: Москва никогда не спит) is a song recorded by Russian electronic musician DJ Smash who was inspired by the song "One (Always Hardcore)" by the German band Scooter.

A reworked version of this song, with the alternative refrain "Russia Never Sleeps", accompanied the Russian bid presentation for the 2018 FIFA World Cup.

The melody and rhythmical base of the song is very close to "Move on Baby" by the Italian group Cappella, though it is unknown if the similarity is occasional or intended.

== Content ==
The song is sung in both English and Russian (Я люблю тебя, Москва, meaning "I love you, Moscow"). It is an ode to the titular city of Moscow.

== Charts ==
=== Weekly charts ===
Weekly chart performance for "Moscow Never Sleeps"
Chart (2008)	Peak position
Russia Airplay (TopHit)	1

=== Year-end charts ===
Year-end chart performance for "Moscow Never Sleeps"
Chart (2008)	Position
Russia Airplay (TopHit)	8

=== Decade-end charts ===
Decade-end chart performance for "Moscow Never Sleeps"
Chart (2000–2009)	Position
Russia Airplay (TopHit)	44
