= Thrill Pill =

Russian rapper (born 2000)

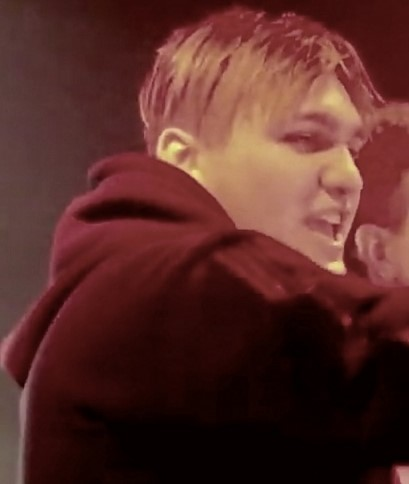

Background information
- Born: Timur Tofikovich Samedov; 22 October 2000 (age 25); Moscow, Russia
- Genres: Rap; Hip Hop; Trap
- Occupation: Musician
- Years active: 2015-present
- Labels: Warner Music Russia (2019–2020); Media Land (2020)

Timur Tofikovich Samedov (Russian: Тиму́р То́фикович Саме́дов) (born 22 October 2000, Moscow, Russia), better known under the stage name THRILL PILL (Russian: Трилл Пилл) is a Russian rapper and songwriter. He is a former member of the rap associations "Zakat 99.1", currently being a member of and contributor to the collective "Deceptikony".

== Biography ==
The young rapper was born in Moscow on 22 October 2000, spending his childhood years in the Maryino District.

== Career ==
Having released "Moskovskiye Hroniki" through the label, Timur shared details of cooperation with the label. At the time of creating the album "Otkroveniya", the artist had writer's block, and because of the release, he didn't like Warner Music Russia.

Thrill Pill's manager decided to resell the album on Sony Music. After the decision was made, threats from the director of Warner Music Russia followed. The director promised that if Timur left, they would do everything they could to make the album fail. Thrill Pill decided to release the album from them and go to Sony Music, but when everything was ready, the director said that if he doesn't sign a contract for 10 more songs, then neither the album nor the video would be released. Then the next album would be submitted to Warner Music Russia.

The main themes of Thrill Pill's early songs included amusement, alcohol, girls, sex & narcotics.

== Discography ==
=== Studio albums ===
Year	Title
2019	"Откровения"
2020	"Московские Хроники"
2021	"Грустное"
2022	Chelsea 3
2023	"Искренне я"

=== Mixtapes ===
Year	Title
2018	Fuelle Noir
2020	«BIRTHDAY MIX 2020»
2021	«BIRTHDAY MIX 2021»
2022	«BIRTHDAY MIX 2022»
2023	«BIRTHDAY MIX 2023»

=== Singles ===
==== As lead artist ====
Year	Title	Album
2017	"Thrill Pill"	Non-album single
2017	"Смерть комментатора"	Non-album single
2017	"Rest in Pussy" (feat. Lil $ega)	Non-album single
2017	"Молодой трилл"	Non-album single
2017	"Гламурный подонок"	Non-album single
2017	"Как достать соседа"	Fuelle Noir
2018	«Деньги» (feat. Yung Trappa)	Non-album single
2019	"Сука Раздевайся"	"Сам дамб щит, Vol. 2"
2019	"Boss Freestyle!"	Non-album single
2019	"Грустная песня" (feat. Egor Kreed & Morgenshtern)	"Откровения"
2020	"Бентли"	Non-album single
2021	"Миллионы"	"Грустное"
2021	"Трап Дом" (feat. Soda Luv)	Non-album single
2021	"ДЛТ" (feat. Famous Killa)	Non-album single
2021	"Дерево" (feat. Tima Belorusskih)	"Грустное"
2022	"ДУЛО"	Chelsea 3
2022	"2017"	Chelsea 3
2023	"DECEPTICON 2023"	Non-album single
2023	"Одна ночь" (feat. Johnyboy)	Non-album single
2023	"Я ЗВЕЗДА!"	Non-album single
2023	"Творить волшебство" (feat. ushira)	Non-album single
2023	"Бухаю" (feat. deyezaxo)	Non-album single
2023	"Кто Ты Такая?" (при уч. xxxmanera)	Non-album single
2023	"НЕ ДОГНАТЬ 3" (feat. LIL FLOM)	Non-album single
2024	"Я ГОВНО" (feat. Шайни)	Non-album single

==== Guest feature ====
Year	Title	Other singers	Album
2016	"Subaru"	Lizer	Frozen
2016	"Sci-Fi Weapons"	Flesh & Lizer	Sci-Fi
2016	"High Technologies"	Flesh, Lizer & Krestall/Courier	Audiopunk
2018	"ЮВАО"	Furry	"ЮВАО"
2018	"Bugatti"	Пиплток	Feminist
2018	"Golf"	Flesh	Audiopunk 3: Architector
2018	"Drug Racing"	Skylight	Trapdilla
2019	"Bag"	Henparty	—
2019	"Lifestyle Magnifique"	Playboidaddi	Loft 2
2019	"Волк с Уолл-стрит"	—	Up Next 2
2019	"Вокруг"	Shooval	"Граф"
2019	"Hot Wheels"	Little Prince	Prime Time
2020	"Cybertruck"	Flesh	Cosmopolitrap
2020	"Stein"	Nullzweizwei	Stein
2020	"Чипсы"	Mayot, Feduk, Blago White & Seemee	Ghetto Garden
2020	"Orange Bands"	Savage Red	Side Effect
2020	"Karuptsi"	Blago White, Mayot, OG Buda, Plohoyparen	Myasa
2020	"Секреты"	SKB	"Секретные материалы"
2020	"Окей"	Пламли & Споти	"Супер"
2021	"Yung Trappa"	D.masta & Yung Trappa	Extendo
2021	"Виктория Сикрет"	163onmyneck & OG Buda	Grow Guide
2021	"NHL Money"	Obladaet	Players Club
2021	"No Love"	Essay	—
2021	"Секса remix"	Lovv66	"Физикал Пэйн"
2021	"Око за око"	G4Our	Welcome 2 Reap
2021	"Business"	Yung Trappa	Forever
2021	"Узел"	Plohoyparen	"Грязный колдун"
2021	"Зажигалка"	Soda Luv	Roomination и Roomination: Reloaded
2022	"Весело"	SKB	808
2022	"Таймер"	SKB	808
2023	"Лизер"	FLESH	AUDIOPUNK 4: Couturier
2023	"Не абонент"	Паша Техник & МС Кальмар	Что-то с чем-то
