= Selyavi =

2022 single by Morgenshtern

Single by Morgenshtern
- Released: 8 April 2022
- Genre: Hip hop
- Length: 2:49
- Label: Independent
- Songwriters: Gredy; Morgenshtern; Morgenshtern
- Producers: Gredy; VisaGangBeatz; Illuminati Production

Morgenshtern singles chronology
"12" (2022)	"Selyavi" (2022)	"Nomer" (2022)

"Selyavi" is a song by Russian rap singer and musician Morgenshtern, released on April 8, 2022 on an independent label through NCA backed by Effective Records. The song is about Alisher's breakup with his girlfriend Dilara. The song was produced by Gredy, VisaGangBeatz, and Illuminati Production, and the lyrics were written by Morgenstern himself. In less than 24 hours, the song garnered over 1 million views on YouTube.

== Title ==
The title of the song refers to the French expression "c'est la vie", which translates to "that's the way life is"

== Cover artwork ==
The cover of the song depicts wedding rings Alisher and Dilara in the form of handcuffs set with diamonds.

== Background ==
On February 18, 2022, Dilara and Morgenshtern posted a joint post on their Instagram accounts with the caption "Recorded a fit. We're getting divorced" alarming some of their fans.

The lyrics of the song "12" released on March 14, 2022, hinted at the couple's divorce: "My bed is king size, but queens change fast [...] Shopaholic bitch - I wear chawls like things [...] A new bitch is nice, even nicer is a new passport".

On April 6, 2022, a leaked snippet of the song hit the internet, causing a public outcry online.

== Tracklist ==
Digital Distribution
No.	Title	Lyrics	Music	Length
1.	"Selyavi"	Morgenshtern	Gredy; VisaGangBeatz; Illuminati Production	2:40
