= Mediacube =

YouTube partnership program

- Founded: 2015
- Headquarters: Nicosia, Cyprus
- Key people: Michael Bychanok (founder and owner)
- Website: Official website

Mediacube is an international company founded in 2015 that provides fintech and support services for YouTube and Facebook content creators. The company has the status of an official partner of YouTube.

Mediacube provides such services as connecting bloggers with advertisers, copyright protection, content distribution, etc.

== History ==
Originally, the company created engaging video content, alongside commercials and broadcasts for banks, mobile service providers, and retail businesses. By 2015, it secured its position as an official YouTube partner through a successful tender. The company became an MCN (Multi-Channel Network), a company that provides assistance in managing channels on YouTube. After receiving MCN status, MediaCube entered the global market. Mediacube holds the status of a YouTube CSP (Content Service Provider).

In 2018, it was included in the top-3 YouTube partner networks in Eastern Europe. In 2019, the company raised investments from the Zubr Capital private equity fund.

In 2019, Mediacube became an official partner of the TikTok video service. Also in 2019, Mediacube was included in the TOP 20 content rights holders in the world and was one of Google's largest contractors, working with partners from 68 countries.

== Overview ==
Mediacube provides creators with alternative financial solutions and money management. Mediacube develops solutions to finance, manage, and simplify YouTube advertising revenue.

MC Pay, a product by Mediacube, allows creators to withdraw their earnings to their preferred payment methods. In 2022, MC Pay users generated over 200 billion views. MC Pay is available on web, Android, and iOS.

In 2018, the company's revenue was $4.5 million, in 2019, it was $18 million, in 2020 – $30 million, and in 2022 it was $70 million.
