= Sharlot =

Sharlot Шарлот
- Birth name: Eduard Valeryevich Sharlot
- Born: February 7, 1998
- Genres: Pop; Indie pop
- Instruments: keyboards; guitar; bass guitar; drums
- Years active: 2013 — present
- Labels: Sony Russia

Eduard Valeryevich Sharlot (Russian: Эдуард Валерьевич Шарлот; born on February 7, 1998), better known mononymously as Sharlot, is a Russian singer, songwriter, composer, musician, and actor. Since November 22, 2023 he has been detained for blasphemy, and is considered as a political prisoner.

== Biography ==
=== Early life ===
Eduard Valeryevich Sharlot was born on February 7, 1998, in Samara, Russia. He was raised in a single-parent household alongside his twin brother Vitaly. His parents divorced when Eduard was five, and his father, Valery Vladimirovich, took responsibility for his upbringing. Eduard studied music at a young age, learning solfège and various musical instruments. In his teenage years, he formed a band called The Way of Pioneers, playing rock music. Eduard also began posting music covers on YouTube, notably of The Beatles and other rock bands.

=== Career ===
Sharlot gained initial recognition for his covers of the Ukrainian band Poshlaya Molly. These covers caught the attention of the band's frontman, Kirill Bledny, who shared them on his social media, propelling Sharlot into the public eye. In 2017, he signed with the Djem label, releasing his first EPs "This Is Our World" and "Ah, I'm Happy". In 2019, Sharlot released his debut studio album "Forever Young" with Sony Music Russia. He also participated in the second season of the TV show Songs on TNT, but did not reach the finals.

In 2019, Sharlot appeared on the TV show Evening Urgant and released his first major album, Forever Young. He also performed his first solo concert in Moscow and later collaborated with singer Tosha Chaykina. His visibility grew further in 2020 with a commercial for MegaFon and the release of his music video for "Baby Girl," featuring a collaboration with rapper Morgenshtern.

== Imprisonment ==
Following Russia's invasion of Ukraine, Sharlot became a subject of controversy in Russia. He faced accusations from nationalist groups and political figures like Ekaterina Mizulina, who filed complaints against him. In June 2023, Sharlot burned his Russian passport, publicly denouncing the Russian government and expressing his desire to support Ukraine. He faced legal action for his actions, including the destruction of his passport and charges for insulting Russian authorities.

In November 2023, he was detained by Russian police and faced charges, including the destruction of his passport. He apologized for his actions but continued to publicly oppose the Russian government. In December 2023, Sharlot was placed in pretrial detention, with his incarceration extended through 2024.

In March 2024, the human rights organization Memorial recognized Sharlot as a political prisoner, citing violations of his right to free speech and fair trial. Sharlot's legal battles continue as he remains in custody. His political stance has led to widespread attention and his inclusion in Russia's list of extremists and terrorists in 2024.
