= Morgenshtern =

Russian and Israeli rapper (born 1998)

Morgenshtern Моргенштерн
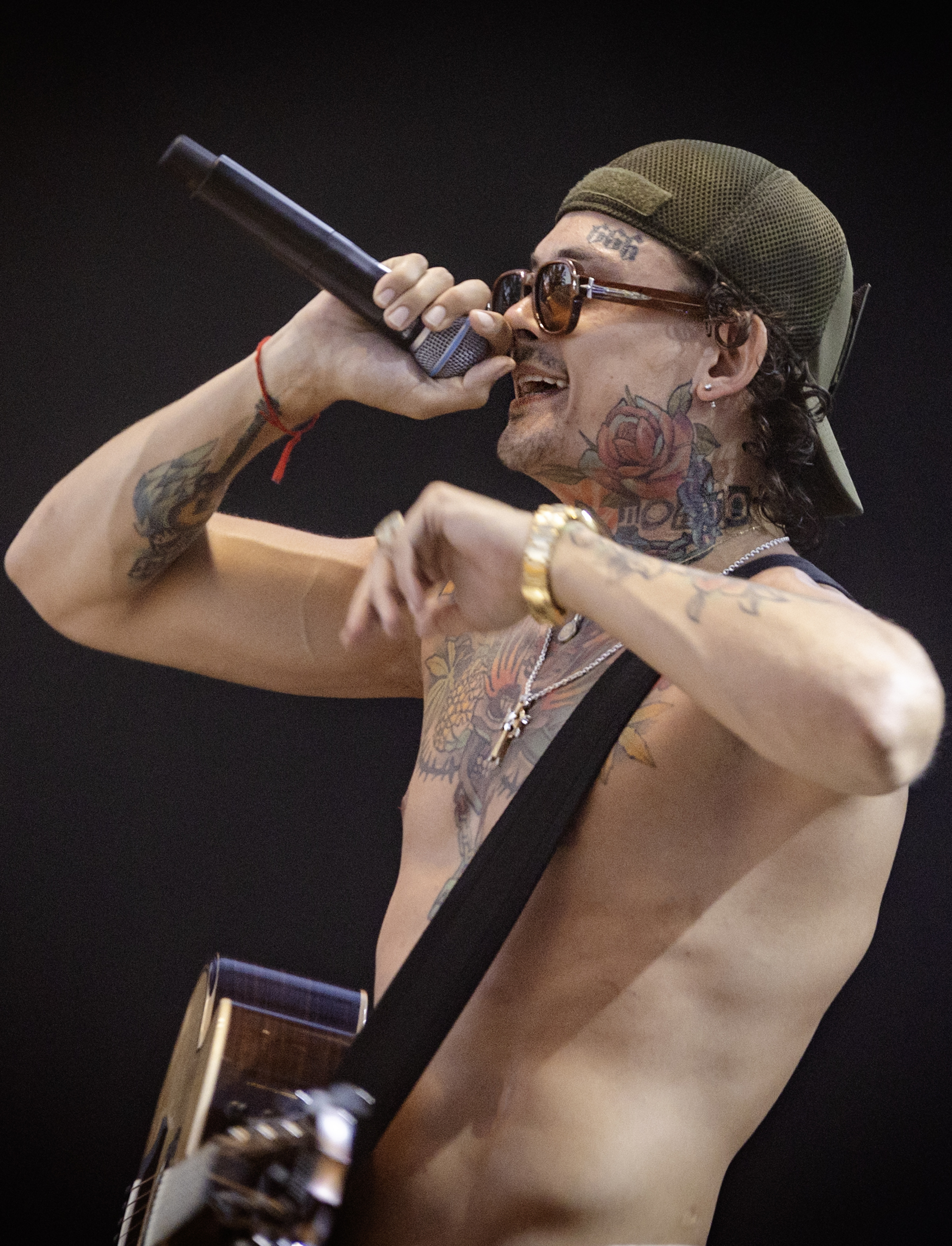
- Morgenshtern in 2024

Background information
- Also known as: 1st July; MamaVirgin; DeeneS MC
- Born: Alisher Tagirovich Valeyev; 17 February 1998 (age 28); Ufa, Bashkortostan, Russia
- Genres: Rap; trap; rock
- Occupations: Rapper; singer; songwriter; musician; YouTuber
- Instruments: Vocals; guitar
- Years active: 2015–present
- Labels: Bugatti; S&P Digital; Atlantic; Sony Russia; Believe Digital

Alisher Tagirovich Morgenshtern (Note: Russian: Алишер Тагирович Моргеншtern; Bashkir: Ғәлишер Таһир улы Моргенштерн, romanized: Alişer Tahir ulı Morgenştern) (né Valeyev; (Note: Russian: Алишер Тагирович Валеев; Bashkir: Алишер Таһир улы Вәлиев, romanized: Alişer Tahir ulı Väliyev); born 17 February 1998), known professionally as Morgenshtern, is a Russian-Israeli rapper, singer-songwriter, and record producer. In June 2026, he legally changed his name to Israel Yehuda Morgenshtern (Note: Russian: Исраэль Йегуда Моргенштерн; Hebrew: ישראל יהודה מורגנשטרן) following his conversion to Judaism.

He first gained fame in 2017 through parodies of popular music artists of the time, which he published on YouTube. In 2018, he abandoned this format to release original music, building his subsequent career on his own material. His work is often accompanied by eccentric PR campaigns, and his public persona, performances, and controversial stunts have frequently attracted attention from the media and government officials.

In addition to his music career, Morgenshtern co-founded the Moscow restaurants "Kaif Provenance" and "Kaif Burger" (both of which closed in 2022), and established the Telegram-based media outlet "Not Morgenshtern".

== Biography ==
Alisher Tagirovich Valeyev was born on 17 February 1998, in Ufa; he legally took his mother's surname, Morgenshtern, as a teenager. His mother, Marina Morgenshtern, is of Russian-Jewish descent and ran a flower shop business in Ufa, while his father, Tagir Valeyev, was a businessman of Bashkir descent. His parents divorced when he was young, and when Alisher turned 11, his father died of liver cirrhosis following a severe struggle with depression and alcoholism.

He developed an interest in music during childhood. As a teenager, he filmed skateboarding videos with his friends under the name "Others Crew" and, under the early pseudonym DeeneS MC, released his first music video, "My vyshe oblakov" (We Are Above the Clouds), in 2010 featuring Bely Ap.

He attended the Bashkir State Pedagogical University but was expelled due to his controversial YouTube activities. He later enrolled in the Ufa State Aviation Technical University to study computer science, but was also expelled shortly after starting.

Morgenshtern also worked as a street musician, and was the frontman of the rock band MMD Crew (short for "My Mother the Virgin Crew"), with whom he collaborated on a track with the Russian rapper Face and recorded under the aliases MamaVirgin and 1st July. He also provided post-production for Face's early music videos.

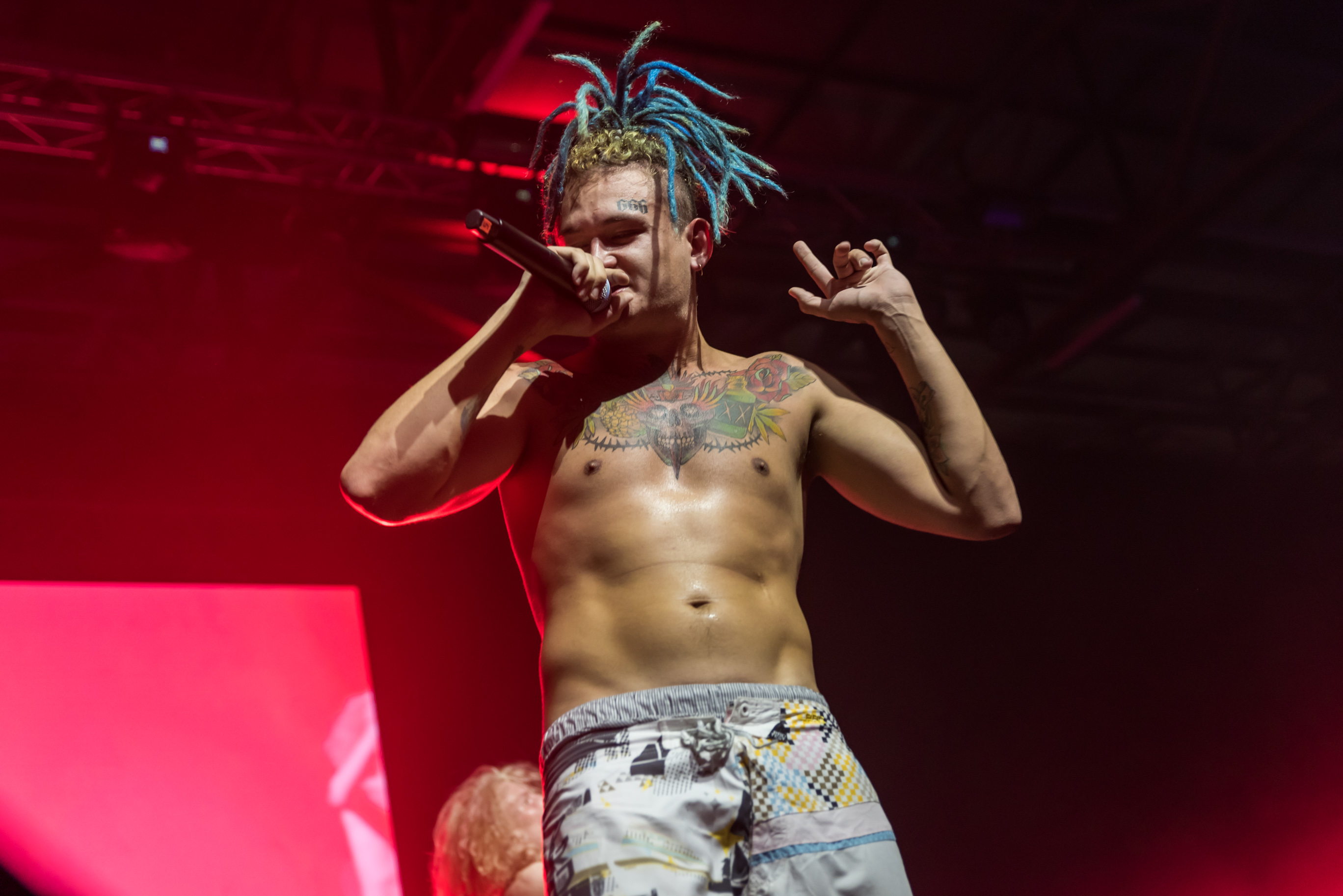
Morgenshtern performing at Vidfest 2018, Moscow, Russia

He is best known for his YouTube show "#EasyRap".

In April 2021, Morgenshtern donated ₽666,666 to the "Our Children" orphan support fund in Bashkortostan, representing the largest private donation to the non-governmental organization at the time.

In May 2022, the Russian Ministry of Justice designated Morgenshtern a foreign agent, citing funding from the Israeli multi-channel network Yoola Labs and his public remarks questioning the celebrations of Victory Day. Morgenshtern later apologized for his comments on his Telegram channel but unsuccessfully appealed the designation in court.

=== Conversion to Judaism ===
In June 2026, Morgenshtern officially completed giyur (the process of conversion to Judaism) under a rabbinical court (Beit Din) in Israel. He adopted the Hebrew name Israel Yehuda Morgenshtern (ישראל יהודה מורגנשטרן). This followed a period of spiritual reflection after his rehabilitation. In late 2025, he delivered a public lecture titled "How I Returned to God" at a synagogue in Vienna. Throughout late 2025 and 2026, he began studying Jewish scriptures, conducting public lectures on the Torah and religion, and incorporating these themes into his public communications, such as keeping kashrut and observing Shabbat.

== Personal life ==
=== Relationship with Dilara ===
Beginning in 2017, he dated social media personality Dilara Zinatullina, but the couple separated in October 2019 after Alisher proposed an open relationship. They reconciled in the summer of 2020 and married in Moscow on 31 August 2021. He had proposed to her in July 2021 during the filming of his "Nominalo" music video. On 8 April 2022, the single Selyavi was released, hinting at a separation. On 9 April, Dilara posted a YouTube video confirming their divorce.

=== Treatment for alcoholism ===
Morgenshtern has struggled with alcoholism and chronic insomnia, which he frequently self-medicated with alcohol and other substances. In January 2025, he checked into the "Phoenix Rehab" clinic in Rishon LeZion, Israel, to undergo a comprehensive treatment program for addiction. He completed a five-month course of rehabilitation, leaving the clinic in late May 2025 to commit to a sober lifestyle.

=== Bipolar disorder and depression ===
Morgenshtern has been diagnosed with bipolar affective disorder and depression, both of which he has discussed openly in his music and interviews as major influences on his behavior and artistic periods.

== Music career ==
On 17 January 2020, he released the album Legendarnaja pyl', which was recorded in one week during a series of live streams. The album became the most successful of his career up to that point, gaining one million streams on VK within the first half-hour of its release and five million streams in eleven hours. Within the first two days, the album accumulated over 21 million streams on VK, setting a record for the platform. On 30 January 2020, he appeared as a guest on the Evening Urgant show.

On 5 March 2020, he released the track "Malyshka", a collaboration with Sharlot. On 5 June 2020, he released the single "Pososi". The official music video for "Pososi" became the most disliked YouTube video in Russia. On 9 June 2020, he released the single "Cadillac", in collaboration with Eldzhey. On 31 July 2020, he released "Ice", which went viral on TikTok.

On 3 November 2020, Morgenshtern was interviewed by Yury Dud in an episode that lasted nearly three hours.

In July 2021, Spotify named Morgenshtern the most-streamed artist from Russia.

In November 2021, the head of the Investigative Committee of Russia, Alexander Bastrykin, publicly accused Morgenshtern of "effectively selling drugs on social media." Consequently, the artist left Russia and settled in Dubai, UAE, resulting in the cancellation of his remaining Russian concerts. On 10 December, he released the single "Domoy", addressing his forced emigration.

On 14 February 2025, Morgenshtern released his seventh EP, Alisher, which marked a transition to a raw, Russian-rock-influenced style. Recorded prior to his rehabilitation, the five-track EP details his struggles with mental illness, loneliness, and substance abuse.

On 13 February 2026, to mark his first year of sobriety, he released the acoustic live album Dead Sea Live, recorded on a salt island in the Dead Sea.

== Business ==
In June 2020, Alisher Morgenshtern and Eduard Popov (better known as the autoblogger Yanis Grek and a member of the YouTube channel "Team A") registered the private limited company "KAIF". In October 2020, Morgenshtern opened the restaurant "Kaif Provenance" in an office building on Bolshaya Dmitrovka Street in Moscow. In September 2021, he opened a second establishment, the "Kaif Burger" restaurant, on Nikolskaya Street.

In June 2022, Morgenshtern announced the closure of "Kaif Provenance" due to constant legal pressure, inspections, and fines; the "Kaif Burger" restaurant on Nikolskaya Street was also subsequently closed in October 2022.

In March 2021, Morgenshtern was appointed "youth director" of Alfa-Bank. While promoted as formal employment, the bank later clarified that it was a marketing campaign targeting younger audiences.

== Political views ==
Morgenshtern opposed the 2022 Russian invasion of Ukraine. His 2022 single 12 was dedicated to this stance, with lyrics condemning political and military leaders who send young soldiers to the front lines. Following his anti-war stances, he was officially designated a foreign agent in Russia in May 2022.

In June 2023, the government of Kyrgyzstan canceled his scheduled performance at the Alga Fest music festival in Bishkek, citing his "bad influence" on youth, which media observers attributed to the Kyrgyz government's alignment with Russian political pressure.

He supported the 2024 Bashkortostan protests, publishing images of the Bashkir national hero Salawat Yulayev on social media in solidarity with the protesters.

In 2024, his concerts in the United Arab Emirates were canceled, and he was subsequently denied re-entry to Dubai after Russian authorities pressured UAE officials to enforce restrictions against him as a "foreign agent." Following his exclusion from the UAE, he made Israel his primary place of residence.

In April 2026, he successfully challenged a 10-year ban on entering Lithuania. The Supreme Administrative Court of Lithuania ruled that the Lithuanian migration authorities' ban, originally imposed in November 2025 on national security grounds, was based on subjective opinions and lacked objective evidence.

== Scandals ==
=== Foreign agent designation and legal challenges ===
On 6 May 2022, the Ministry of Justice of Russia added Morgenshtern to its registry of "foreign agents". His legal team filed lawsuits to appeal the designation, arguing that the artist's activities were purely creative and entertainment-focused rather than political; however, Russian courts repeatedly rejected his appeals.

Throughout 2023 and 2024, the Savelovsky District Court of Moscow repeatedly fined Morgenshtern for failing to include the mandatory "foreign agent" warning labels on his social media and advertising posts, or for failing to submit financial reporting to the Ministry of Justice.

=== Criminal case and conviction ===
In September 2024, the Investigative Committee of Russia initiated a criminal case against Morgenshtern under Part 2 of Article 330.1 of the Criminal Code of the Russian Federation for deliberate evasion of duties imposed by the foreign agent legislation. In January 2025, he was officially placed on Russia's federal wanted list, and a Moscow court subsequently ordered the seizure of his remaining Russian real estate, including his Podmoskovye estate and three office buildings in Moscow.

On 20 April 2026, a Moscow court convicted Morgenshtern in absentia, sentencing him to a fine of ₽7 million. His defense team subsequently appealed the verdict, contesting the legal validity of the prosecution.

== Discography ==
=== Studio albums ===
- Do togo kak stal izvesten (2018)
- Ulybnis, durak! (2019)
- Legendarnaja pyl' (2020)
- Million Dollar: Happiness (2021)
- Million Dollar: Business (2021)
- Last One (2022)

=== Live albums ===
- Dead Sea Live (2026)

=== Remix albums ===
- Golden Hits (2023)
- Golden Hits, Vol. 2 (2023)

=== EPs ===
- Hate Me (2018)
- Alisher (2025)

=== Singles ===
- "Kopy na khvoste" (with Timurka Bits) (2018)
- "Vot tak" (2018)
- "Otpuskayu" (2018)
- "Turn It On!" (with PALC) (2019)
- "Guerra" (2019)
- "Novyy merin" (2019)
- "Igrovoy computer" (with EQT_Albert) (2019)
- "Mne pokh" (with Klava Koka) (2019)
- "Yung Hefner" (2019)
- "Sad Song" (with Thrill Pill and Egor Kreed) (2019)
- "Mne pokh (Acoustic Version)" (with Klava Koka) (2020)
- "Malyshka" (with Sharlot) (2020)
- "Pososi" (2020)
- "Cadillac" (with Eldzhey) (2020)
- "Ice" (2020)
- "Lollipop" (with Eldzhey) (2020)
- "El Problemá" (with Timati) (2020)
- "Watafuk?!" (with Lil Pump) (2020)
- "Klip za 10 lyamov" (2020)
- "Cristal & МОЁТ" (2020)
- "Degenerat (Deluxe)" (with Dzharakhov) (2021)
- "Rozovoye vino 2" (with Yung Trappa) (2021)
- "Family" (with Yung Trappa) (2021)
- "Novaya volna" (with DJ Smash) (2021)
- "Leck" (with Imanbek and Fetty Wap featuring KDDK) (2021)
- "Dulo" (2021)
- "Cristal & МОЁТ (Remix)" (with Soda Luv, OG Buda, blago white and MAYOT) (2021)
- "Show" (2021)
- "Ya ne znayu" (with Slava Marlow) (2021)
- "Home" (2021)
- "Pochemu?" (2022)
- "12" (2022)
- "Selyavi" (2022)
- "Nomer" (2022)
- "Izvestnym" (with The Limba) (2022)
- "Daleko" (with Aarne) (2022)
- "5:00 am" (with LSP) (2022)
- "Skolko stoi lubov" (with The Limba, Niletto and BoombI4) (2022)
- "Priton" (with Vacío) (2022)
- "Bugatti" (with Arut) (2022)
- "Ya ubil Marka" (Oxxxymiron Diss) (2022)
- "Double Cup" (with Kizary) (2022)
- "Tsveti" (with Lida) (2022)
- "Grustno" (with Magic Man) (2023)
- "Ne Prada" (with Arut and Eldzhey) (2023)
- "Poydet" (2023)
- "Ratatatata (MØRFI Remix)" (with Vitya AK) (2023)
- "If I Ever" (with Onative and Rich the Kid) (2023)
- "Chernyy Russkiy" (2023)
- "Schitalochka" (2023)
- "Poslednyaya Lyubov" (2024)

== Filmography ==
- Posledniy trek (2021)
- Ufaboyz (2025)

== Awards and honors ==
Year	Award	Nomination	Result	Source
2020	Topical Style Awards 2020	Woman of the Year	Won	
2020	GQ Person of the Year 2020	Musician of the Year	Won	
2025	Berlin Music Video Awards	Best Director (for "Last Love")	Nominated	
