= Eldzhey =

Russian rapper and songwriter (born 1994)

- Элджей
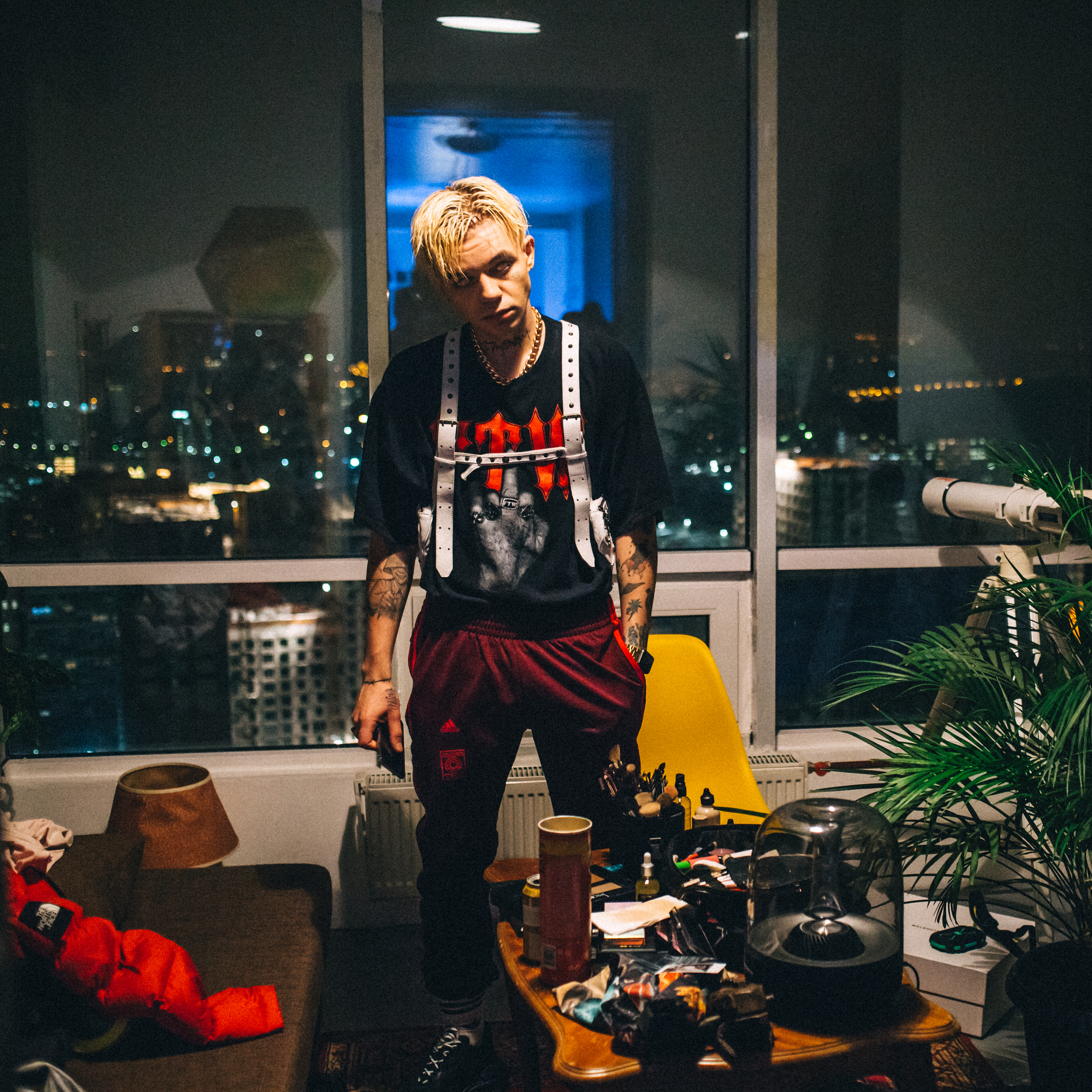
- Born: Alexey Konstantinovich Uzenyuk; July 9, 1994 (age 31); Novosibirsk, Russia
- Other name: Allj
- Occupations: Rapper; songwriter
- Years active: 2010–present
- Spouse: Nastya Ivleeva (m. 2019; div. 2021)
- Musical career
- Genres: Hip hop
- Labels: Company Pirates; Cream&Nal; Universal; 143; ZBV

Alexey Konstantinovich Uzenyuk (Russian: Алексей Константинович Узенюк; born July 9, 1994), known professionally as Eldzhey (Russian: Элджей), is a Russian rapper, hip-hop and pop singer and songwriter best known for his hit singles "Rozovoye vino" (The Pink Wine), "Рваные джинсы" (The Ripped Jeans) and "360°".

== Early life ==
Alexey Uzenyuk was born on July 9, 1994, in Novosibirsk, Russia.

== Career ==
Uzenyuk began his career by songwriting in early 2010s. He published his first album, Бошки дымятся, in 2015, but rose to fame in 2016 with his second album, Sayonara Boy, which charted well in Russian streaming platforms.

In 2017, Eldzhey and Feduk's single "Rozovoye vino" became one of the year's biggest hits in Russia, topping the streaming charts and gaining more than 200 million streams on VK.

The same year, Eldzhey was the face on Yves Saint Laurent's La Nuit De L’homme Intense perfum line. The next year, he voice-acted in the Russian version of Disney's Ralph Breaks the Internet in the role of Spamley.

=== The arrival of success ===
By the beginning of 2017, LJ's appearance started undergoing changes, and the rapper's new style started getting closer to the style of Zef and Die Antwoord.

Back in October 2016 in a video interviewTo the TNT MUSIC channel, Aljay talked about what influenced his changes in music. On September 15, 2016, the first single "Disconnect" was presented on iTunes together with the performer Kravts. October 7, 2016, he released the album Sayonara Boy, which successfully debuted on the Russian Apple Music and iTunes charts, taking second place there.

On June 22, 2017, he released his new album Sayonara Boy ろ, exclusively for the social network "VKontakte". The album was released on Apple Music and iTunes on June 24, 2017. The first single from the album was "FckuDJ", released on January 1, 2017. The second single was the track "Ripped Jeans", released on June 13, 2017: in a few days the track became the most popular on VKontakte and took the lead. Thus, by the end of 2017, LJ had six studio albums on his account, the last of which was Sayonara Boy ろ

On December 1, 2021, he went to live in Cyprus after allegations of promoting drugs. A month and a half later, on January 18, 2022, he returned to Russia.

On March 3, 2023, Feduk sued Eldzhey over their joint track Punks Not Dead, which was posted without Fedor's permission. That same month, it was revealed that Eldzhey had formed the Sayonara Boys basketball team, which has been competing in Medialiga since April 1.

== Personal life ==
Uzenyuk began dating Russian TV presenter Nastya Ivleeva in 2018, and they were married in 2019. In August 2021, the couple announced their divorce.

== Discography ==
=== Albums ===
- Бошки дымятся (2015)
- Катакомбы (2016)
- Sayonara Boy (2016)
- Sayonara Boy ろ (2017)
- Sayonara Boy X (2018)
- Sayonara Boy 143 (2018)
- Sayonara Boy Opal (2020)
- Sayonara bоль (2023)

=== Singles ===
- Rozovoye vino (feat. Feduk)
- Sayonara detka (feat. Era Istrefi)
- Cadillac (feat. Morgenshtern)
- Lamborghini Countach
