= The Flow (website) =

Russian music & entertainment portal

The Flow is a Russian music and entertainment site surrounding hip-hop culture, founded in 2014.

== History ==
On 2 June 2014, the former team of Rap.ru launched the site The Flow as the main media site for rap and everything, especially with what's popular among Russian youth.

In 2017, editors of The Flow released a show on their YouTube channel called "Russian rap in first person". The first guest on the show was rapper Vitya from the group "АК-47".

In 2019, The Flow and label Universal Music Russia launched a competition for rappers, with the main prize being a music video consisting of a budget for fifteen thousand dollars. The judge of the competition was rapper Vladi of "Kasta".

=== Management and employees ===
Editors:

- Ruslan Munnibaev (Moscow) (2014—present)
- Aleksei Gorbash (Minsk) (2014—2021)
- Nikolai Redkin (Moscow) (2014—2020)
- Andrei Nedashkovskiy (Kyiv) (2014—present)
- Kirill Busarenko (Vladivostok) (2018—present)

== Statistics ==
According to the Internet company Alexa, in November 2020, The Flow was rated among the 30 thousand most popular sites on the Internet.

== Other projects ==
In 2014, chief editor Andrei Nikitin became editor-in-chief of the Moscow-based journal Time Out, later becoming the section editor of "Music" on the site Afisha Daily, and also becoming a judge on the Jager Music Awards, where he has been getting help from Lesha Gorbash & Nikolai Redkin.

On 24 July 2017, Andrei Nikitin gave a lecture at the summer cinema "Музеон" on "how rap in Russia went from a marginal genre into the youth mainstream".
