= Slava Marlow =

Russian rapper, music producer (born 1999)

Slava Marlow Артём Артёмович Го́тлиб
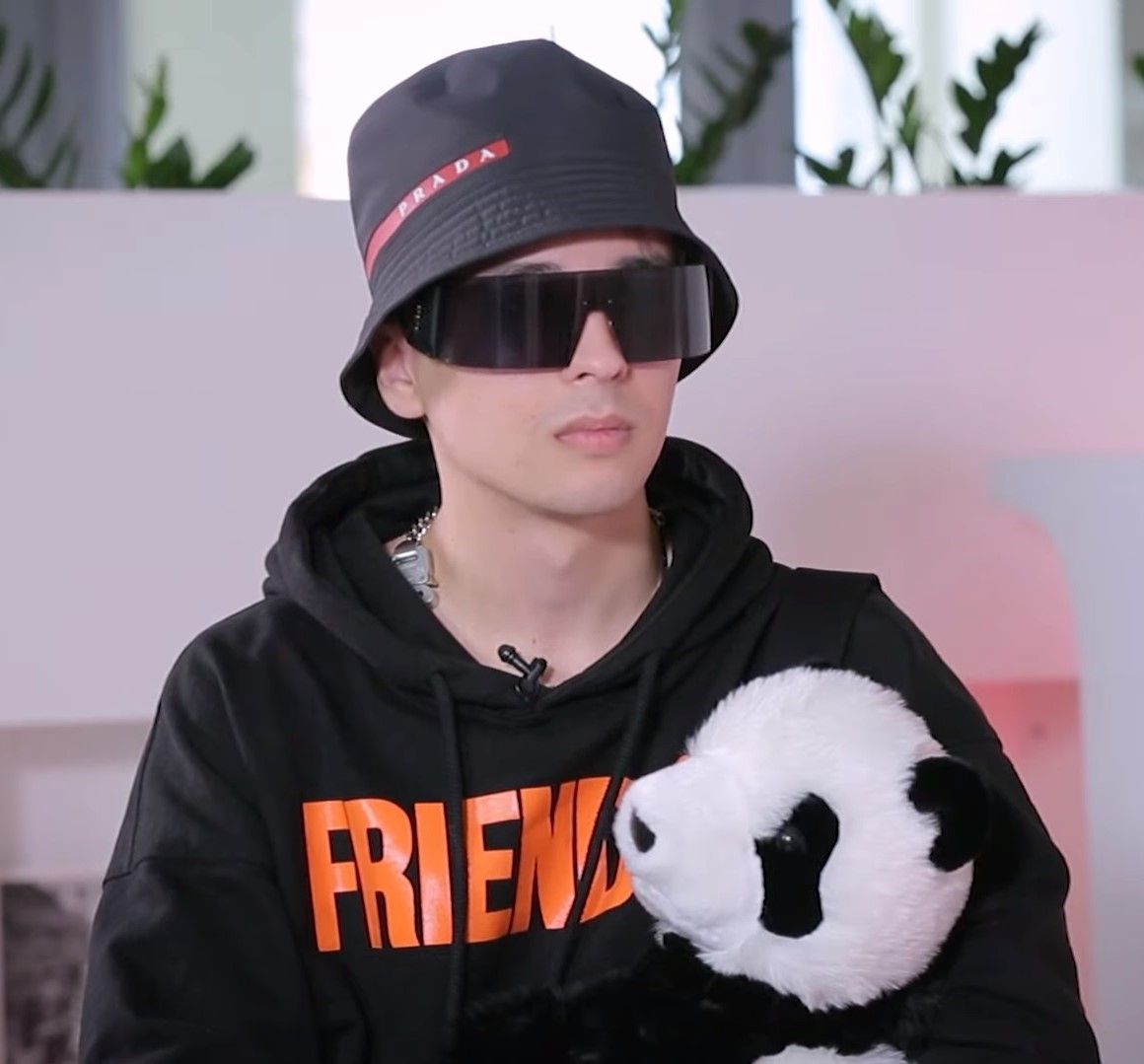

Background information
- Born: October 27, 1999 (age 26); Novosibirsk, Russia
- Genres: Rap, pop
- Occupations: Music producer, sound engineer, composer, rapper, YouTuber
- Years active: 2015-present
- Labels: Otackucrew (2015-2018); Mediacube Music (2018-2020); Atlantic Records Russia (2020-present)

Artyom Artyomovich Gotlib (born October 27, 1999, in Novosibirsk), better known as Slava Marlow, is a Russian rapper, music producer and YouTuber. He first gained popularity after producing music for Russian rap star Morgenshtern in 2019. Since 2020, he has had a successful solo career.

== Personal life ==
Artyom Artyomovich Gotlib was born on October 27, 1999, in Novosibirsk, Russia. His parents divorced when he was young. His father, Artyom Markovich Gotlib, is the deputy director of the Moscow Museum of the History of the Gulag and a member of the Russian Federation Union of Journalists and the Russian Geographical Society. His mother works as a psychotherapist.

On October 27, 2012, he graduated from a music school, where he focused on piano and saxophone.

In 2018, after leaving school, he moved to St. Petersburg. There, he entered the Institute of Film and Television in the Faculty of Screen Arts and studied towards a degree in Film and Television Production. In 2019, he went on academic leave and moved to Moscow. On March 10, 2021, he was expelled from this school for an undisclosed reason.

In December 2021, Marlow underwent a hair transplant.

== Career ==
=== 2015-2019: beginning ===
In 2015, Slava began experimenting with beatmaking.

On August 8, 2016, he created his YouTube channel. Among his first uploads were the music videos "Donat" (2016) and "King of Snapchat" (2017).

In April 2019, he co-founded the satirical music group Malchugeng along with N. Masteroff and Stephen Pie. Together, they released two albums: My Gang, which was recorded in 12 hours, and Back and Forth, which was recorded in one day.

On July 27, 2019, Slava released his first solo album Opening under the pseudonym Manny. The album did not receive much attention, gaining fewer than 10,000 listeners.

=== 2019-present: widespread fame ===
In October 2019, Slava began to collaborate with popular Russian rap star Morgenshtern.

On February 12, 2020, he released the song "TikTok Challenge", which became popular on the app TikTok. This sparked the usage of the hashtag #yamoguwottakvot on the app. As of August 2020, over 700,000 videos on TikTok have been made using this hashtag.

On August 3, 2020, in an interview with Forbes Magazine, Slava talked about how he earned his first million dollars after moving to Moscow, teaching beat-making courses.

On October 22, 2020, he uploaded a video to his YouTube channel entitled "Artyom", in which he reveals his birth name and that an unknown group had extorted large amounts of money from him for hiding his real name online. In the same video, he shared a story from his early life where, for an unknown reason, he began disliking his father, and subsequently, stopped liking his last name, patronymic and first name, deciding to go by Slava Marlow instead. On the same day, he released the song "I'm Getting Drunk Again", which topped the Apple Music song chart.

On October 23, 2020, he released the mini-album Artyom, which included features by Morgenshtern and Eldzhey.

On March 11, 2021, he was a guest on the Russian television show Evening Urgant.

== Collaborations with Morgenshtern ==
On September 11, 2019, Slava uploaded a song and accompanying video, both entitled, Morgenshtern Let's Make a Fit, in which he invites Russian rap star Morgenshtern to collaborate with him on a song. On October 19, he uploaded a video in which he revealed that Morgenshtern agreed to a collaboration.

On December 20, 2019, Morgenshtern released the song "Yung Hefner", which included music produced by Slava. In an accompanying video, Morgenshtern said that the song was made in 2 hours and announced a week long series of live broadcasts in which he and Slava would work on a new album together. These broadcasts took place on Morgenshtern's YouTube channel between January 6 and 12, 2020. The finished album was officially released on January 17, 2020, with the name LEGENDARNAYA PYL'.

On January 27, 2020, it was announced that Slava Marlow and Morgenshtern were to appear on the Russian television show Evening Urgant. On January 31, 2020, a rap track featuring Slava Marlow, Morgenshtern and the host of Evening Urgant, Ivan Urgant, was released

On July 4, 2020, Slava invited Russian rapper Timati to make a song with himself and Morgenshtern. Timati agreed, on the condition that the music video be filmed to his standards.

On December 24, 2020, Slava, along with Morgenshtern, became participants in the wedding talk show Let's Get Married.
