= Atlantic Records Russia =

Russian record label

- Parent company: Warner Chappell Music (Warner Music Group)
- Founded: 2018; 8 years ago
- Founder: Emin; Bahh Tee
- Defunct: 2022; 4 years ago
- Distributor: Warner Music Russia
- Country of origin: Russia
- Location: Krasnogorsk, Moscow Oblast, Russia

Atlantic Records Russia (known until 24 March 2021 as Zhara Music) was a Russian record label that served as one of Atlantic Records' branches, owned by Warner Music Group through its Russian division. The company took part in music distribution, bookings, promotion of artists, music content and organizational activities. The label's artists included Morgenshtern, HammAli & Navai, Emin, Bahh Tee, Rauf & Faik, Jony, ЛСП, Dava, Johnyboy, RaiM & other musicians.

== History ==
=== Zhara Music (2018–2020) ===
On 15 June 2018, Emin Agalarov, vice-president of the holding Crocus Group, better known as Emin, released the song «Невероятная». This release started the music label Zhara Music. The partner for helping the project was Russian singer Bakhtar Aliyev, also known by his stage name Bahh Tee, also the owner of music label Siyah Music.

=== Atlantic Records Russia (2021–2022) ===
On March 24, 2021, it became known about the purchase of the Warner Music Group label, on its basis the Russian division of the American label Atlantic Records, which is part of the Warner Music group of companies, was created. Bakhtiyar Aliyev headed the newly created label. Later, the approximate cost of acquiring the record company became known - $25,000,000. Later, the collection Atlantic Records Russia: F1rst Blood was released to coincide with the creation of a new label.

On February 24, 2022, a message appeared in the official Atlantic Records Russia VKontakte group about the cancellation of all upcoming releases and the postponement of their premieres for an indefinite period. On March 10, 2022, due to the Russian invasion of Ukraine, Atlantic's parent organization and distributor, Warner Music Group, announced the suspension of operations in Russia, including investment and project development, advertising and marketing activities, and the production of all physical products.

On 1 March 2023, Bahh Tee stepped down from his position as CEO of Atlantic Records Russia. He created a new label, Lotus Music.
