= Top Hit Music Awards =

Russian and Ukrainian music awards ceremony

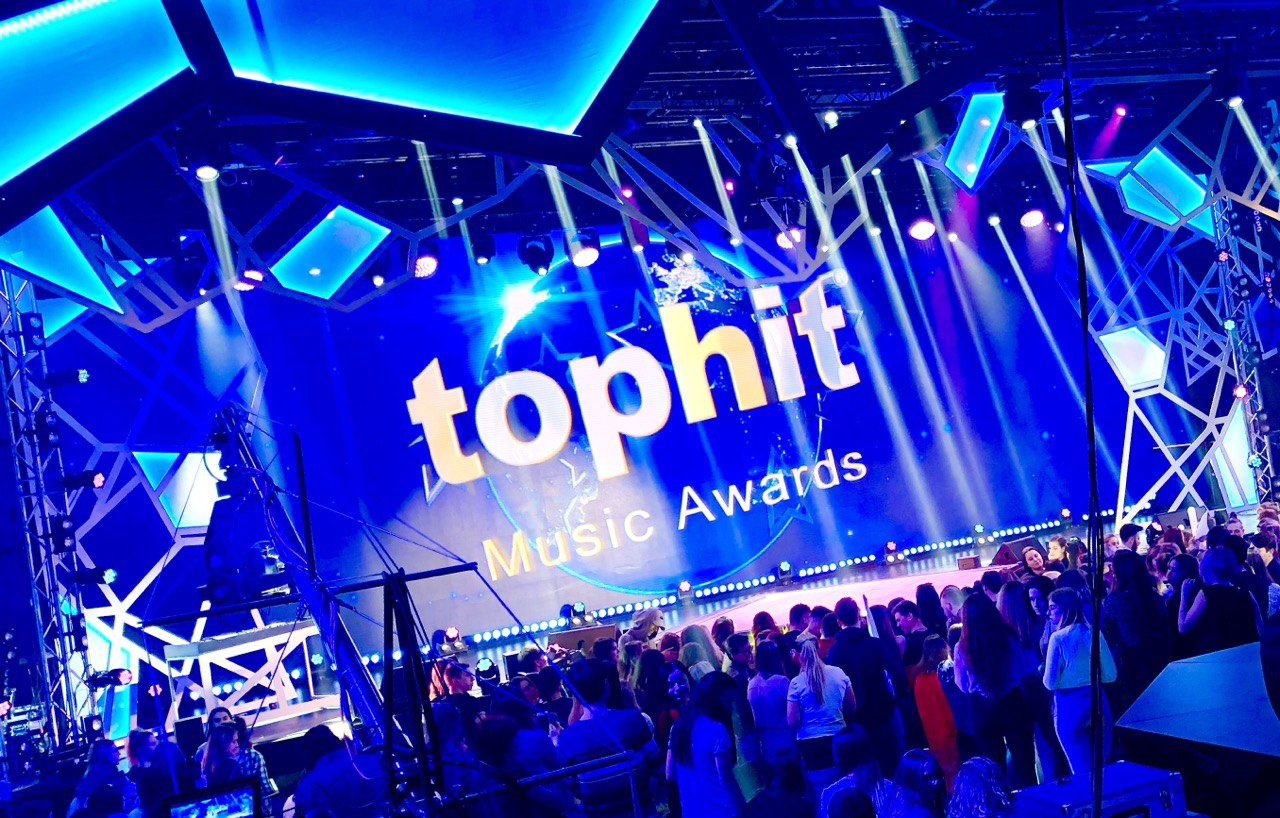
- Awarded for: Achievements in popular music and the recording industry based on radio airplay and streaming data
- Date: Since 2013
- Location: Moscow, Russia
- Country: Russia and Ukraine
- Presented by: TopHit (Igor Kraev)
- Website: thma.tophit.live

Top Hit Music Awards is an annual music award ceremony established by TopHit in 2013. Artists, songwriters, and producers from Russia, Ukraine, other countries of Eastern Europe, and worldwide are recognized for achievements in popular music and the recording industry based on radio airplay data and online music video views. Performers are also recognized for concert shows. Ceremonies have been held annually in Moscow.

Top Hit Music Awards recognizes performers from Russia, Ukraine, Eastern Europe, the Baltic states, Central Asia, and international markets. Past chart leaders and recipients include Alla Pugacheva, Valery Leontiev, Jason Derulo, Billie Eilish, David Guetta, Pink, Coldplay, Imagine Dragons, Imany, BTS, Svetlana Loboda, Bi-2, Zemfira, A'Studio, Dan Balan, Serebro, Little Big, Max Barskih, Zivert, and Niletto.

The ceremony also includes a Top Hit Hall of Fame. Each year, 10 nominees are proposed by partner radio stations through voting, after which existing Hall of Fame inductees elect two new members.

== Reception ==
Russian singer Yolka noted that the Top Hit Music Awards determines recipients strictly through statistical airplay data rather than a jury. Yolka has received the award multiple times, including the "Artist of the Decade" award after TopHit recorded over 19 million radio airplays of her songs over a ten-year period.

Time Out described the ceremony as an "unbiased prize of numbers" based on broadcast statistics.

== Nomination structure ==
Main awards for singers

- Local Russian artists and groups most played on Russian radio in the past year
- Foreign artists and groups most played on Russian radio in the past year
- Local Russian artists most played on YouTube Russia in the past year
- Foreign artists most played on YouTube Russia in the past year
- Local Russian artists most played on Spotify Russia in the past year
- Foreign artists most played on Spotify Russia in the past year

Other awards for singers

- Artist of the Decade, Takeoff, Breakthrough, Comeback, and other special categories

Nominations for songs

- Russian hits most played on Russian radio over the year
- Foreign hits most played on Russian radio over the year
- Russian hits most played and watched on YouTube Russia over the year
- Foreign hits played and watched on YouTube Russia over the year
- Russian hits most played on Spotify Russia in the past year
- Foreign hits most played on Spotify Russia in the past year

Professional nominations

- Local Russian composers and lyricists most played on Russian radio during the past year
- Local Russian producers whose artists were most played on Russian radio during the past year
- Local Russian record labels whose artists were most played on Russian radio during the past year
- Foreign record labels whose artists were most played on Russian radio during the past year
- Local Russian composers and lyricists most played and watched on YouTube Russia during the past year
- Local music video directors whose music videos were most played on YouTube Russia over the year
- Local record labels whose artists were most played on YouTube Russia over the year

== Winners ==
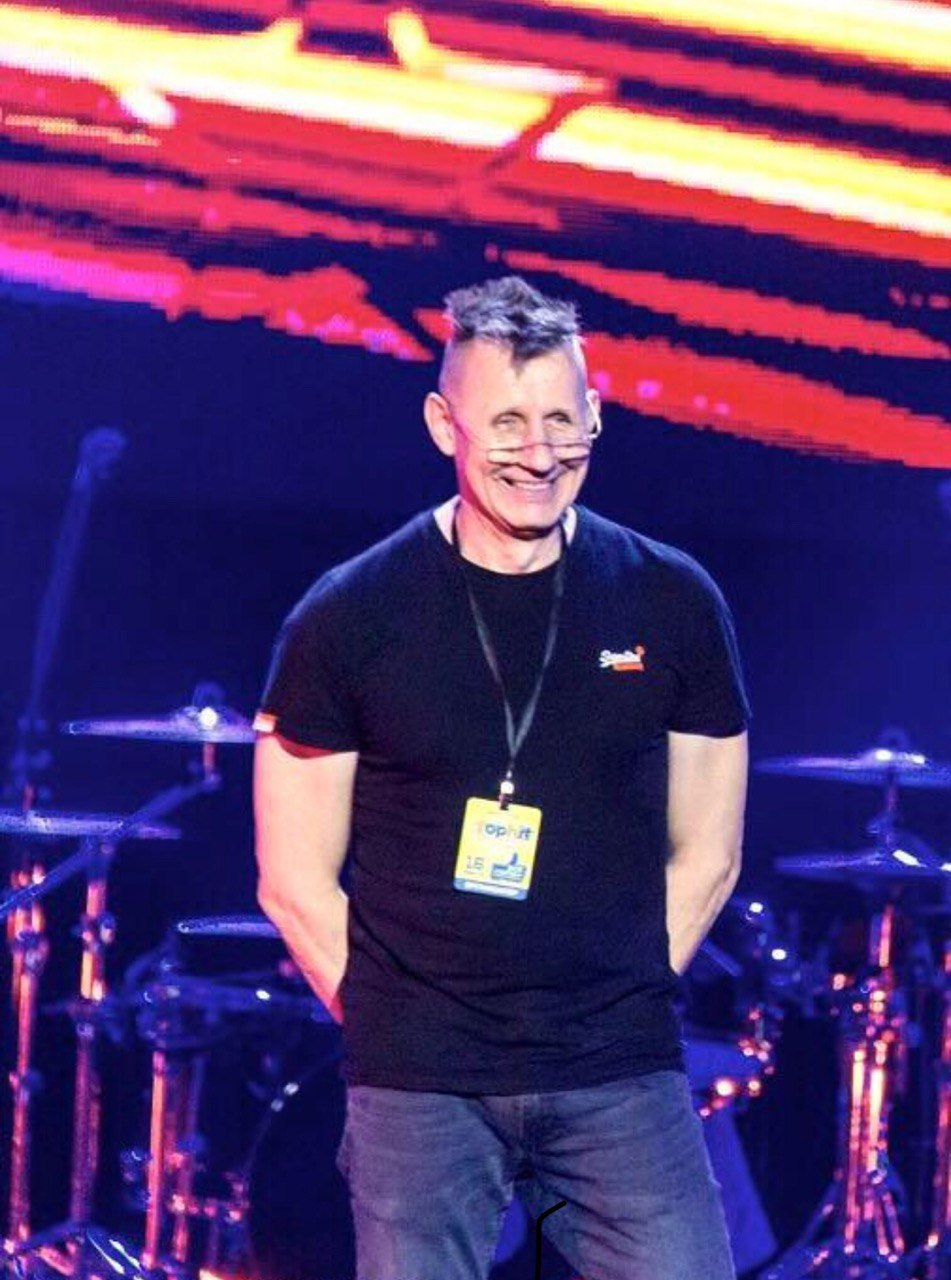
Igor Kraev hosting a ceremony

=== 2013 ===
Winners: Grigory Leps, Yolka, Nyusha, Gradusy, 5sta Family, Diskoteka Avariya, Kristina Orbakaitė, Eva Polna.

Date of ceremony: April 25, 2013, "The Artist" Club, Moscow.

Hosts: Yulia Kovalchuk, Dmitry Koldun, Zaza Napoli, Alexey Ostudin.

Featured musicians: Philipp Kirkorov, Yolka, Gradusy, Eva Polna, Dima Bilan, Vintage, Morandi, Irakli, Batishta, Dino MC47, Diskoteka Avariya, Polina Gagarina, 5sta Family, Dominic Joker, Elvira T, Reflex.

Winners of Top Hit Music Awards Russia 2013:

The best male singer on the radio

- Grigory Leps

The best female singer on the radio

- Nyusha
- Yolka

The best band on the radio

- Gradusy

Radio Hit of the Year (female vocals)

- "Next to you" (Около тебя) (Yolka)

Radio Hit of the Year (mixed vocals)

- "We are together" (Вместе мы) (5sta Family)
- "Weather forecast" (Прогноз погоды) (Diskoteka Avariya & Kristina Orbakaitė)

Radio Hit of the Year (male vocals)

- "Sweeps" ("Заметает") (Gradusy)

The most ordered song on the radio

- "I don't love you either" ("Я тебя тоже нет") (Eva Polna)

Awards in special nominations

Radio Discovery of the Year

- Elvira T

Radio Breakthrough

- Eva Polna
- DJ Smash
- Dominic Joker

Radio Comeback

- Polina Gagarina

The longest-playing radio hit

- "Provence" (Прованс) (Yolka)

Professional awards

Authors of the Year

- Lev Shapiro (for the song "The best day" (Самый лучший день) performed by Grigory Leps)
- Egor Solodovnikov (author of the songs "Next to you" (Около тебя) and "Provence" (Прованс) performed by Yolka)
- Alexey Romanov (author of the songs of Vintage)
- Roman Pashkov, Ruslan Tagiyev (authors of the Gradusy band's hits)

Producers of the Year

- Alyona Mikhailova, Liana Meladze (for producing the singer Yolka)
- Oleg Nekrasov (for producing the band Gradusy)
- Denis Sattarov, Irina Shcherbinskaya (for producing the singer Elvira T)

Labels of the Year

- Universal Music Russia
- Warner Music Russia
- Velvet Music

Hall of fame

- A-Studio
- Alexey Romanov
- Alla Pugacheva
- Valery Meladze
- Dima Bilan
- Eva Polna
- Zemfira
- Konstantin Meladze
- Maxim Fadeev
- Mitya Fomin
- Yuri Aizenshpis (posthumously)

=== 2014 ===
Winners: Grigory Leps, Yolka, Nyusha, Nu Virgos, Vintage, A-Studio, Calvin Harris, Imany, Serebro, Avicii, Pharrell Williams, Pink, Daft Punk.

Date of ceremony: February 27, 2014, "Radio City Bar & Kitchen" club, Moscow.

Hosts: Igor Kraev, Zaza Napoli.

Featured musicians: Nyusha, Mitya Fomin, A-Studio, Serebro, Nu Virgos, Gradusy, Vintage, DJ Smash, Roma Kenga, 30.02, Guru Groove Foundation.

Winners of Top Hit Music Awards Russia 2014:

Best Local male singer on the Radio

- Grigory Leps

Best Local female singer on the Radio

- Nyusha
- Eva Polna

The best local band on the radio

- Gradusy
- Vintage

Best international male singer on the Radio

- Avicii
- Pharrell Williams

Best international female singer on the Radio

- Pink

The best international band on the radio

- Daft Punk

The most ordered local singer on the radio

- Grigory Leps
- Nyusha
- Serebro

The most ordered international singer on the radio

- Pharrell Williams
- Pink

Song awards

Local Radio Hit of the Year (female vocals)

- "In private" ("Наедине") (Nyusha)

Local Radio Hit of the Year (male vocals)

- "I always remember the main thing" ("Я всегда помню о главном") (Gradusy band)

International Radio Hit of the Year (male vocals)

- "Get Lucky" (Daft Punk feat. Pharrell Williams)

International Radio Hit of the Year (female vocals)

- "Diamonds" (Rihanna)

The most ordered local song on the radio

- "I'm happy" ("Я счастливый") (Grigory Leps)
- "Not enough of you" (Serebro)
- "In private" ("Наедине") (Nyusha)

The most ordered international song on the radio

- "Lendo Calendo" (Dan Balan feat. Tany Vander & Brasco)
- "Get Lucky" (Daft Punk feat. Pharrell Williams)
- "Tu Me Manques" (Mia Martina)

Awards in special nominations

Radio Discovery of the Year

- Pizza (Пицца)
- 30.02

Radio Breakthrough

- A-Studio

Professional awards

- Dmitry Dubinsky (author of the music in the song "I'm happy" ("Я счастливый") performed by Grigory Leps)
- Yuri Parenko (author of the lyrics in the song "I'm happy" performed by Grigory Leps)
- Roman Pashkov, Ruslan Tagiyev (authors of the song "I always remember the main thing" performed by the band Gradusy)
- Olga Seryabkina (author of the song "Not enough of you" ("Мало тебя") performed by the band Serebro)
- Sergey Prikazchikov (author of the song "Weapons" ("Оружие") performed by the Pizza band)
- Alexander Khoroshkovaty (author of the song "Stars in puddles" ("Звёзды в лужах") performed by the band 30.02)

Producers of the Year

- Vladimir and Oksana Shurochkina (singer Nyusha)
- Alexander Nikitin (Grigory Leps)
- Oleg Nekrasov (Gradusy band)
- Alexey Romanov (Vintage)
- Maxim Fadeev (Serebro band)
- Anton Pronin (Pizza band)
- Sergey Baldin (band 30.02)
- Baigali Serkebayev (A-Studio band)

Labels of the Year

- Universal Music Russia
- Velvet Music
- National Music Corporation
- Pronin Management

Hall of fame

- Diskoteka Avariya

=== 2015 ===
Winners: Grigory Leps, Yolka, Nyusha, Nu Virgos, Vintage, Calvin Harris, Imany, Serebro, Egor Kreed, Dmitry Koldun.

Date of ceremony: April 23, 2015, "Radio City Bar & Kitchen" club, Moscow.

Hosts: Timur Rodriguez, Yulia Kovalchuk.

Featured musicians: Yolka, Serebro, Nyusha, Egor Kreed, MBAND, Anita Tsoy, 5'sta Family, Band'Eros, Nu Virgos, Vera Brezhneva, Vintage, Dasha Suvorova, Vakhtang, Burito, MakSim, Masha and Mowgli, Mayakovsky band, Pizza, Lexter.

Winners of Top Hit Music Awards Russia 2015:

Best Local male Singer on the Radio

- Grigory Leps

Best Local female Singer on the Radio

- Nyusha
- Yolka

The best Local band on the radio

- Nu Virgos
- Vintage

Best international male Singer on the Radio

- Calvin Harris

Best international female Singer on the Radio

- Imany

The most ordered local singer on the radio

- Serebro

Song awards

Local Radio Hit of the Year (female vocals)

- "I won't give you up" ("Я тебя не отдам") (Serebro)

Local Radio Hit of the Year (male vocals)

- "City of Big Lights" ("Город больших огней") (Dmitry Koldun)

Local Radio Hit of the Year (mixed vocals)

- "You know" ("Ты знаешь") (Yolka feat. Burito)

International Radio Hit of the Year (male vocals)

- "Am I Wrong" (Nico & Vinz)

International Radio Hit of the Year (female vocals)

- "You Will Never Know" (Imany)

The most ordered local song on the radio

- "I won't give you up" ("Я тебя не отдам") (Serebro)
- "I got another one" ("У меня появился другой") (Nu Virgos feat. Vakhtang)

The most ordered international song on the radio

- "Lendo Calendo" (Dan Balan feat. Tany Vander & Brasco)
- "Get Lucky" (Daft Punk feat. Pharrell Williams)
- "Tu Me Manques" (Mia Martina)

Awards in special nominations

Radio Discovery of the Year

- Egor Kreed
- Masha and Mowgli
- Mayakovsky band

Radio Comeback

- Nu Virgos

Professional awards

- Igor Burnyshev (author of the song "You Know" performed by Burito feat. Yolka)
- Maxim Fadeev (author of the song "I won't give you up" performed by the band Serebro)
- Olga Seryabkina (author of the lyrics of the song "I won't give you up" performed by the band Serebro)
- Dmitry Koldun (author of the song "City of Big Lights" performed by Dmitry Koldun)
- Irina Sekacheva (author of the lyrics of the song "City of Big Lights" performed by Dmitry Koldun)
- Konstantin Meladze (author of the song "I have Another one" performed by Nu Virgos feat. Vakhtang)

Producers of the Year

- Konstantin Meladze (Nu Virgos band)
- Alexey Romanov (Vintage band)
- Anna Pletneva (Vintage band)
- Maxim Fadeev (Serebro band)
- Valery Belotserkovsky (Masha and Mowgli band)
- Sergey Krasnenko (Mayakovsky band)
- Vladimir and Oksana Shurochkina (singer Nyusha)

Labels of the Year

- Sony Music Entertainment Russia
- Universal Music Russia
- Warner Music Russia
- Black Star
- Broma 16
- Velvet Music

Hall of fame

- Yolka, Alyona Mikhailova

=== 2016 ===
Winners: Grigory Leps, Egor Kreed, Yolka, Vintage, MBAND, Robin Schulz, Imany, Nyusha, Timati, Serebro.

Date of ceremony: April 28, 2016, Stereo Dome Club, Moscow.

The organizer of the IV TopHit Music Awards Ceremony was the TopHit company.

Producer General: Igor Kraev

Executive Producer: Pavel Balashov

Hosts: Timur Rodriguez, Anna Semenovich.

Featured musicians: Yolka, Nyusha, Egor Kreed, MBAND, Anita Tsoy, 5'sta Family, Band'Eros, Nu Virgos, Vera Brezhneva, Vintage, Dasha Suvorova, Vakhtang, Burito, MakSim, Masha and Mowgli, Mayakovsky band, Pizza, Lexter.

Winners of Top Hit Music Awards Russia 2016:

Best Local male Singer on the Radio

- Grigory Leps
- Egor Kreed

Best Local female Singer on the Radio

- Yolka

The best local band on the radio

- Vintage
- MBAND

Best international male Singer on the Radio

- Robin Schulz

Best international female Singer on the Radio

- Imany

The most ordered local singer on the radio

- Nyusha
- Vintage

Best local Singer on YouTube Russia

- Timati

The best local band on YouTube Russia

- Serebro

Song awards

Local Radio Hit of the Year (female vocals)

- "Tsunami" (Nyusha)

Local Radio Hit of the Year (male vocals)

- "Mama" (Burito)
- "You are the most" ("Самая-самая") (Egor Kreed)
- "Don't be silent" ("Не молчи") (Dima Bilan)

Local Radio Hit of the Year (mixed vocals)

- "There is nothing more to love" ("Любить больше нечем") (Jigan feat. Julia Savicheva)

International Radio Hit of the Year (male vocals)

- "Are You With Me" (Lost Frequencies)

International Radio Hit of the Year (female vocals)

- "The Good, The Bad And The Crazy" (Imany)

The best video clip YouTube Russia

- "You are the most" ("Самая-самая") (Egor Kreed)

Awards in special nominations

Radio Discovery of the Year

- Burito
- MBAND
- Yulianna Karaulova

Professional awards

- Igor Burnyshev (author of the music and words in the song "Mama" performed by Burito)
- Ilya Pale (author of the verses in the song "Mama" performed by Burito)
- Anna Shurochkina (author of the song "Tsunami" performed by singer Nyusha)
- Mikhail Reshetnyak (author of the music in the song "You are the most" ("Самая-Самая") performed by Egor Kreed)
- Egor Bulatkin (author of the words in the song "You are the most" ("Самая-Самая") performed by Egor Kreed)

Producers of the Year

- Alexey Romanov, Anna Pletneva (Vintage band)
- Maxim Fadeev (Serebro band, Yulia Savicheva)
- Black Star (Egor Kreed, Timati)
- Alyona Mikhailova, Liana Meladze (singer Yolka)
- Konstantin Meladze (MBAND band)
- Vladimir and Oksana Shurochkin (singer Nyusha)
- Irina Shcherbinskaya (Yulianna Karaulova)
- Yana Rudkovskaya (Dima Bilan)

Labels of the Year

- Black Star
- Velvet Music
- Warner Music Russia
- Universal Music Russia
- Sony Music Entertainment Russia

Hall of fame

- Sergey Lazarev, Sergey Shnurov, Arman Davletyarov / Muz-TV.

=== 2017 ===
Winners: Alekseev, Yolka, Yulianna Karaulova, Loboda, Serebro, Coldplay, Sia, Artik & Asti.

Date of the ceremony: March 16, 2017, Crocus City Hall, Moscow.

The organizer of the V TopHit Music Awards Ceremony was the TopHit company and Volkov PRO.

Producer General: Igor Kraev

Producer: Maxim Volkov

Executive Producers: Pavel Balashov and Ksenia Kabisheva

Director of Photography: Grigory Skomorovsky

Hosts: Timur Rodriguez and Zlatoslava, Yulia Kovalchuk and Alexey Chumakov, Mitya Fomin and Anita Tsoy.

Featured musicians: Yolka, Alekseev, Loboda, Elena Temnikova, Burito, MBAND, Anita Tsoy, Yulianna Karaulova, Nu Virgos, Artik & Asti, Anna Pletneva, Gradusy, Eva Polna, Banderos, Slava, Quest Pistols Show, Kristina Si. Sergey Shnurov, winner of the Top Hit Music Awards and a member of the TopHit Hall of Fame, and the Leningrad band performed a solo set at the end of the ceremony.

Winners of Top Hit Music Awards Russia 2017:

Best Local male Singer on the Radio

- Alekseev

Best Local female Singer on the Radio

- Yolka
- Yulianna Karaulova
- Loboda

The best Local band on the radio

- Serebro

Best International male Singer on the Radio

- Coldplay

Best International female Singer on the Radio

- Sia

Song awards

Local Radio Hit of the Year (female vocals)

- "I'm warming happiness" ("Грею счастье") (Yolka)

Local Radio Hit of the Year (male vocals)

- "Drunk sun" ("Пьяное солнце") (Alekseev)

Awards in special nominations

Radio Discovery of the Year

- Artik & Asti
- Quest Pistols
- Elena Temnikova
- Kristina Si

YouTube Russia Awards

Best Local male Singer on YouTube Russia

- Egor Kreed
- Timati

The best Local band on YouTube Russia

- Leningrad

The best Local video clip (female vocals)

- "Exhibit" ("Экспонат") (Leningrad)

The best Local video clip (male vocals)

- "Madwoman" ("Сумасшедшая") (Alexey Vorobyov)

The best Local video clip (mixed vocals)

- "Name 505" ("Имя 505") (Time and Glass band)

Professional awards

- Egor Solodovnikov (author of the music and words in the song "I'm warming happiness" ("Грею счастье") performed by Yolka)
- Ruslan Kvint (author of the music in the song "Drunk Sun" ("Пьяное солнце") performed by Alekseev)
- Vitaly Kurovsky (author of the words in the song "Drunk Sun" performed by Alekseev)
- Sergey Shnurov (author of the song "Exhibit" ("Экспонат") performed by Leningrad)
- Alexey Vorobyov (author of the song "Madwoman" ("Сумасшедшая") in his own performance)
- Alexey Potapenko (author of the song "Name 505" performed by the band Time and Glass)

Producers of the Year

- Sergey Shnurov (Leningrad band)
- Maxim Fadeev (Serebro band)
- Alyona Mikhailova, Liana Meladze (singer Yolka)
- Irina Shcherbinskaya, Denis Sattarov (Yulianna Karaulova)

Labels of the Year

- Warner Music Russia
- Sony Music Entertainment Russia
- Effective Records
- Black Star
- Velvet Music

Hall of fame

- Andrey Makarevich / Mashina Vremeni
- Bi-2

=== 2018 ===
Winners: Max Barskih, Yolka, Loboda, Egor Kreed, Gradusy, Burito, David Guetta, Imagine Dragons, Sia, Ed Sheeran

Date of the ceremony: April 11, 2018, Yota Arena, Moscow.

The organizer of the VI TopHit Music Awards Ceremony was the TopHit company and Master Gallery.

Producers General: Igor Kraev and Anita Tsoy.

Executive Producer: Pavel Balashov.

Director of Photography: Anita Tsoy.

Broadcast Director: Vasily Klimov.

Hosts: Timur Rodriguez and Alexander Anatolyevich.

Featured musicians: Double Max, Burito, Estradarada, Elena Temnikova, Filatov & Karas, Vera Brezhneva, Artik & Asti, Gradusy, MBAND, Polina Gagarina, Going Deeper, Yolka.

Winners of Top Hit Music Awards Russia 2018:

Radio

Singers awards

Best Local male Singer on the radio

- Max Barskih

Best Local female Singer on the radio

- Yolka
- Loboda

The best Local band on the radio

- Gradusy
- Burito

Best International male Singer on the radio

- David Guetta

Best International female Singer on the radio

- Sia

The best International band on the radio

- Imagine Dragons

Song awards

Local radio Hit of the Year (female vocals)

- "Your eyes" ("Твои глаза") (Loboda)

Local radio Hit of the Year (male vocals)

- "Fogs" ("Туманы") (Max Barskih)

Local radio Hit of the Year (mixed vocals)

- "Undivided" ("Неделимы") (Artik & Asti)

International radio Hit (male vocals)

- "Shape of You" (Ed Sheeran)

International radio Hit (mixed vocals)

- "Kissing Strangers" (DNCE feat. Nicki Minaj)

Awards in special nominations

Radio Breakthrough

- Gradusy

FonMix Artist of the Year

- Polina Gagarina

The Best Remix Producers

- Going Deeper

YouTube Russia Awards

YouTube Discovery of the Year

- Mushrooms (Грибы)

Best Local male Singer on YouTube Russia

- Egor Kreed

Best Local female Singer on YouTube Russia

- Loboda

The best Local band on YouTube Russia

- Time and Glass

Best International male Singer on YouTube Russia

- Psy

Best International female Singer on YouTube Russia

- C. C. Catch

The best International band on YouTube Russia

- Skillet

The best video clip on YouTube Russia Awards

The best Local video clip (female vocals)

- "Lyrics" (Filatov & Karas feat. Masha)

The best Local video clip (male vocals)

- "Ice melts" ("Тает лёд") (Mushrooms)

The best Local video clip (mixed vocals)

- "On the style" ("На стиле") (Time and Glass band)

Professional awards

- Grib, Daniil Dudulad, Evgeny Yaremenko, Ilya Kapustin (authors of the song "Ice Melts" (Тает лёд) by the band Mushrooms)
- Alexey Potapenko, Alexey Zavgorodny (authors of the song "On style" (На стиле) performed by the band Time and Glass)
- Igor Burnyshev (author of the song "On the Waves" (По волнам) performed by Burito)
- Max Barskih (author of the song "Fogs" (Туманы) performed by Max Barskih)
- Artem Umrikhin, Dmitry Lebedev (authors of the song "Indivisible" (Неделимы) performed by Artik & Asti)
- Loboda, Igor Maysky, Rita Dakota (authors of the song "Your Eyes" performed by Loboda)
- Egor Solodovnikov (author of the music and words in the song "Let the music in" (Впусти музыку) performed by Yolka)

Producers of the Year

- Alyona Mikhailova, Liana Meladze (singer Yolka)

Labels of the Year

- Velvet Music
- Warner Music Russia
- Universal Music Russia
- Effective Records

Hall of fame

- Yuri Shevchuk / DDT
- Leonid Agutin

=== 2019 ===
Winners: Valery Meladze, Yolka, Loboda, Lyube, Calvin Harris, Jax Jones, Imagine Dragons, Sia, Dmitry Malikov, Little Big, Maruv

Date of the ceremony: April 10, 2019, Crocus City Hall, Moscow.

The organizer of the VII TopHit Music Awards Ceremony was the TopHit company and Volkov PRO.

Producer General: Igor Kraev

Producer: Maxim Volkov

Executive Producers: Pavel Balashov and Ksenia Kabisheva

Director of Photography: Grigory Skomorovsky

Broadcast Director: Vasily Klimov

Hosts: Timur Rodriguez and Albina Dzhanabaeva

The host of the online broadcast: Alexander Anatolyevich

Featured musicians: DJ Groove, Yolka, Nu Virgos, Valery Meladze, MBAND, A'Studio & The Jigits, Slava, Gradusy, Rasa, Grivina, Mari Kraimbrery, Zvonkiy, Burito, Nyusha, and Dima Bilan performed a solo set at the end of the ceremony.

Winners of Top Hit Music Awards Russia 2019:

Radio awards

Singers awards

Best Local male Singer on the radio

- Valery Meladze

Best Local female Singer on the radio

- Yolka
- Loboda

The best Local band on the radio

- Lyube

Best International male Singer on the radio

- Calvin Harris
- Jax Jones

Best International female Singer on the radio

- Sia

The best International band on the radio

- Imagine Dragons

Song awards

Local radio Hit of the Year (female vocals)

- "Night" ("Ночь") (Nyusha)

Local radio Hit of the Year (male vocals)

- "Strokes" ("Штрихи") (Burito)

International Radio Hit (female vocals)

- "Breathe" (Jax Jones feat. Ina Wroldsen)

International Radio Hit (male vocals)

- "Hands Up" (Merk & Kremont feat. DNCE)

International Radio Hit (mixed vocals)

- "In My Mind" (Dynoro feat. Gigi D'Agostino)

Awards in special nominations

Radio discovery

- Maruv

Radio breakthrough

- Slava

Radio comeback

- Dmitry Malikov

YouTube Russia Awards

Best Local male Singer on YouTube Russia

- Egor Kreed

Best Local female Singer on YouTube Russia

- Loboda
- Polina Gagarina

The best Local band on YouTube Russia

- Time and Glass

Best International male Singer on YouTube Russia

- Daddy Yankee

Best International female Singer on YouTube Russia

- Katy Perry

The best International band on YouTube Russia

- Imagine Dragons

The best video clip on YouTube Russia Awards

The best Local video clip of the Year

- "Skibidi" (Little Big)

The best Local video clip (female vocals)

- "I want" ("Я хочу") (Grivina)

The best Local video clip (male vocals)

- "Medusa" (Matrang)

The best International video clip (male vocals)

- "Despacito" (Luis Fonsi feat. Daddy Yankee)

The best International video clip (female vocals)

- "Plakala" (Kazka)

YouTube Discovery of the Year

- Matrang
- HammAli & Navai

YouTube breakthrough of the Year

- Little Big

YouTube Comeback of the Year

- Philipp Kirkorov

Awards in special nominations

FonMix Artist of the Year

- Dominic Joker
- Gradusy

The Battle of fan clubs Winner

- Dima Bilan

Professional awards

Authors of the Year

- Konstantin Meladze (author of more than 200 hits performed by Valery Meladze, Vera Brezhneva, Nu Virgos, MBAND, which were performed more than 6.7 million times on Russian radio in 2018)

The Authors of the Hits of the Year

- Nyusha (author of the song "Night" ("Ночь") performed by Nyusha)
- Igor Burnyshev, Andrey Lyskov, Vladimir Krylov (authors of the song "Strokes" ("Штрихи") performed by Burito)
- Ilya Prusikin, Lyubim Khomchuk (authors of the song "Skibidi" performed by Little Big)
- Alan Hadzaragov, Garegin Tamrazyan (authors of the song "Medusa" performed by Matrang)
- Denis Gaziev, Farhad Veisov (authors of the song "I want" ("Я хочу") performed by Grivina)

Producers of the Year

- Natella Krapivina (Loboda)
- Konstantin Meladze (Valery Meladze)
- Alyona Mikhailova, Liana Meladze (Yolka, Burito)
- Igor Matvienko (Lyube)

Labels of the Year

- Warner Music Russia
- Universal Music Russia
- Effective Records
- Velvet Music

Hall of fame

- Yuri Antonov
- Polina Gagarina

=== 2020 ===
Winners: Valery Meladze, Loboda, Max Barskih, Dima Bilan, Ruki Vverh!, Artik & Asti, Billie Eilish, Calvin Harris, Imagine Dragons, Maruv, Little Big

Due to the COVID-19 pandemic, the VIII Top Hit Music Awards Russia ceremony, which was scheduled for April 2020, was canceled. All awards to artists, authors, producers, and record labels were sent by the organizers to the offices of the laureates.

Radio awards

Singers awards

Best Local male Singer on the radio

- Valery Meladze
- Max Barskih
- Dima Bilan

Best Local female Singer on the Radio

- Loboda

The best Local band on the radio

- Ruki Vverh!
- Artik & Asti

Best International male Singer on the Radio

- Calvin Harris

Best International female Singer on the Radio

- Maruv

The best International band on the radio

- Imagine Dragons

Song awards

Local radio Hit of the Year (female vocals)

- "Instadrama" (Loboda)

Local radio Hit of the Year (male vocals)

- "Voices" ("Голоса") (Zvonkiy)

Local Radio Hit (mixed vocals)

- "Sad Dance" ("Грустный Дэнс") (Artem Kacher feat. Artik & Asti)

International Radio Hit (female vocals)

- "Bad Guy" (Billie Eilish)

International radio Hit (male vocals)

- "Shameless" (Denis First & Reznikov & Bright Sparks)

International Radio Hit (mixed vocals)

- "Señorita" (Shawn Mendes & Camila Cabello)

Awards in special nominations

Radio discovery

- Filatov & Karas

YouTube Russia Awards

Best Local male Singer on YouTube Russia

- Arthur Pirozhkov

Best Local female Singer on YouTube Russia

- Zivert

The best Local band on YouTube Russia

- Little Big

Best International male Singer on YouTube Russia

- XXXTentacion

Best International female Singer on YouTube Russia

- Billie Eilish

The best International band on YouTube Russia

- BTS

Awards in special nominations

FonMix Artist of the Year

- Zivert

Professional awards

Authors of the Year

- Konstantin Meladze (author of more than 200 hits performed by Valery Meladze, Vera Brezhneva, Nu Virgos, MBAND, which were performed more than 6.6 million times on Russian radio in 2019)

The Authors of the Hits of the Year

- Andrey Frolov (author of the song "Instadrama" performed by Loboda)
- Dmitry Loren (author of the song "Sad Dance" ("Грустный дэнс") performed by Artik & Asti feat. Artem Kacher)
- Artem Umrikhin (author of the lyrics to "Sad Dance" performed by Artik & Asti feat. Artem Kacher)
- Ilya Prusikin (author of the song "Skibidi" performed by Little Big)
- Lyubim Khomchuk (author of the song "Skibidi" performed by Little Big)
- Denis Kovalsky (author of the song "Hooked" ("Зацепила") performed by Arthur Pirozhkov)
- 2MASHI (authors of the song "Mama I Dance" ("Мама, я танцую") performed by 2MASHI)

Producers of the Year

- Natella Krapivina (Loboda)
- Konstantin Meladze (Valery Meladze)
- Alyona Mikhailova, Liana Meladze (Yolka, Burito)
- Igor Matvienko (Lyube)

Labels of the Year

- Warner Music Russia
- Universal Music Russia
- Effective Records
- Velvet Music

Hall of fame

- Loboda

=== 2021 ===
Winners: Max Barskih, Ruki Vverh!, Zivert, Artik & Asti, The Weeknd, Dua Lipa, The Black Eyed Peas, Klava Koka

Date of the ceremony: April 19, 2021, Madison Restaurant & Club, Moscow.

The organizer of the IX TopHit Music Awards Ceremony was the TopHit company and Vsegda Krasivo (Всегда Красиво).

Producer General: Igor Kraev

Producers: Pavel Balashov, Lisa Bi-2

Executive Producer: Yulia Vlasova

Director of Photography: Olga Slobodskaya

Broadcast Director: Vasily Klimov

Hosts: Timur Rodriguez and Angelika Pushnova

The host of the online broadcast: Dmitry Nesterov

Featured musicians: Yolka, Dabro, Mari Kraimbrery, Habib, Vanya Dmitrienko, Nu Virgos, Filatov & Karas, Cobain Jackets (Куртки Кобейна).

Winners of Top Hit Music Awards Russia 2021:

Radio

Singers awards

Best Local male Singer on the radio

- Max Barskih

Best Local female Singer on the radio

- Zivert

The best Local band on the radio

- Ruki Vverh!
- Artik & Asti

Best International male Singer on the Radio

- The Weeknd

Best International female Singer on the Radio

- Dua Lipa

The best International band on the radio

- The Black Eyed Peas

Song awards

Local Radio Hit of the Year (female vocals)

- "ILY" ("ЯТЛ") (Zivert)

Local Radio Hit of the Year (male vocals)

- "Lei, ne zhalei" (Max Barskih)

Local Radio Hit (mixed vocals)

- "Girl dance" ("Девочка танцуй") (Artik & Asti)

International Radio Hit (female vocals)

- "All Good Things" (NRD1)
- "Salt" (Ava Max)

International Radio Hit (male vocals)

- "Blinding Lights" (The Weeknd)

Awards in special nominations

Radio discovery

- Dabro

Radio Breakthrough

- Klava Koka

YouTube Russia Awards

Best Local male Singer on YouTube Russia

- Niletto
- Morgenshtern

Best Local female Singer on YouTube Russia

- Klava Koka

The best Local band on YouTube Russia

- Little Big

Best International male Singer on YouTube Russia

- 6ix9ine

Best International female Singer on YouTube Russia

- Tones and I

The best International band on YouTube Russia

- BTS

The best video clip on YouTube Russia Awards

The best Local video clip of the Year

- "Uno" (Little Big)

The best Local video clip (female vocals)

- "Left the chat" ("Покинула чат") (Klava Koka)

The best Local video clip (male vocals)

- "Lyubimka" (Niletto)

The best International video clip (female vocals)

- "Dance Monkey" (Tones and I)
- "How You Like That" (Blackpink)

Awards in special nominations

FonMix Artist of the Year

- Mari Kraimbrery

Professional awards

Authors of the Year

- Konstantin Meladze (author of more than 200 hits performed by Valery Meladze, Vera Brezhneva, Nu Virgos, MBAND, which were performed more than 6.6 million times on Russian radio in 2020)
- Ilya Prusikin (author of the songs and clips that received the most views on YouTube Russia in 2020)

The Authors of the Hits of the Year

- Max Barskih (author of the song "Ley, ne zhaley" ("Лей, не жалей") performed by Max Barskih)
- Claudia Vysokova, Alexander Mikheev, Konstantin Koksharov (authors of the song "Left the chat" ("Покинула чат") performed by Klava Koka)
- Ilya Prusikin, Denis Zuckerman, Viktor Sibrinin (authors of the song "Uno" performed by Little Big)
- Danil Prytkov, Andrey Popov (authors of the song "Lyubimka" performed by Niletto)
- Artem Umrikhin, Dmitry Loren (authors of the song "Girl Dance" ("Девочка танцуй") performed by Artik & Asti)
- Ivan Zasidkevich, Mikhail Zasidkevich (authors of the songs "Youth" ("Юность") and "On the Roof" ("На крыше") performed by the Dabro group)

Producers of the Year

- Natella Krapivina (Loboda)
- Konstantin Meladze (Valery Meladze, Vera Brezhneva, Nu Virgos, MBAND)
- Alyona Mikhailova, Liana Meladze (Yolka, Burito)
- Igor Matvienko (Lyube)

Labels of the Year

- Warner Music Russia
- Universal Music Russia
- Effective Records
- Velvet Music

Hall of fame

- Sergey Zhukov, musician and songwriter of band Ruki Vverh!
- Vladimir Presnyakov Jr., musician
- Igor Krutoy, composer and producer

=== 2022 ===
Winners: Max Barskih, Ruki Vverh!, Dima Bilan, Zivert, Artik & Asti, The Weeknd, Inna, Imagine Dragons, Vanya Dmitrienko, Imanbek

Due to the Russian invasion of Ukraine, the X ceremony of the Top Hit Music Awards Russia, which was scheduled for April 2022, was canceled.

Awards to artists, authors, producers, and record labels were sent by the organizers of the award to the offices of the laureates during 2022.

In 2022, TopHit presented awards to artists and hits most streamed by users of the Spotify platform in Russia.

Winners of Top Hit Music Awards Russia 2022:

Radio

Singers awards

Best Local male Singer on the Radio

- Dima Bilan

Best Local female Singer on the Radio

- Zivert

The best Local band on the radio

- Artik & Asti

Best International male Singer on the Radio

- The Weeknd

Best International female Singer on the Radio

- Inna

The best International band on the radio

- Imagine Dragons

Song awards

Local Radio Hit of the Year (female vocals)

- "Ellipsises" ("Многоточия") (Zivert)

Local Radio Hit of the Year (male vocals)

- "Venus–Jupiter" (Vanya Dmitrienko)

Local Radio Hit (mixed vocals)

- "Bestseller" (Max Barskih & Zivert)

International Radio Hit (female vocals)

- "3 To 1" (Monoir feat. Eneli)

International Radio Hit (male vocals)

- "Your Love (9PM)" (ATB & Topic & A7S)

Awards in special nominations

Radio discovery

- Imanbek

YouTube Russia Awards

Best Local male Singer on YouTube Russia

- Habib

Best Local female Singer on YouTube Russia

- Mia Boyka

The best Local band on YouTube Russia

- Dabro

Best International male Singer on YouTube Russia

- Lil Nas X

Best International female Singer on YouTube Russia

- Minelli

The best International band on YouTube Russia

- BTS

The best video clip on YouTube Russia Awards

The best Local video clip (mixed vocals)

- "Pikachu" ("Пикачу") (Mia Boyka & Egor Ship)

The best Local video clip (male vocals)

- "Berry-raspberry" ("Ягода-Малинка") (Habib)

The best Local video clip (female vocals)

- "Dear" ("Родной") (Loboda)

The best International video clip (female vocals)

- "Dance Monkey" (Tones and I)

YouTube Discovery of the Year

- Sultan Laguchev
- Instasamka
- Galibri & Mavik

YouTube Breakthrough of the Year

- Jah Khalib
- Ruki Vverh!

Spotify Russia

Singers awards

Best Local male Singer on Spotify Russia

- Big Baby Tape
- Kizaru

Best Local female Singer on Spotify Russia

- Instasamka

Best Local band on Spotify Russia

- Poshlaya Molly

Best International male Singer on Spotify Russia

- Lil Nas X

Best International female Singer on Spotify Russia

- Doja Cat

The best International band on Spotify Russia

- Måneskin

Songs awards

The best Local hit (male vocals)

- "Déjà vu" ("Дежавю") (Kizaru)

The best Local hit (female vocals)

- "Malchik na devyatke" ("Мальчик на девятке") (Dead Blonde)

Professional awards

Authors of the Year

- Konstantin Meladze (author of more than 200 hits performed by Valery Meladze, Vera Brezhneva, Nu Virgos, MBAND, which were performed more than 6.2 million times on Russian radio in 2021)

Authors of the Hits of the Year

- Alexander Fomenkov, Rahman Sharipov, Evgeny Trukhin (authors of the song "Berry Raspberry" ("Ягода-Малинка") performed by Habib)
- Ivan Dmitrienko, Artem Shapovalov (authors of the song "Venus–Jupiter" ("Венера-Юпитер") performed by Vanya Dmitrienko)
- Samvel Vardyanyan, Julia Zivert, Bogdan Leonovich (authors of the song "Ellipsises" ("Многоточия") performed by Zivert)
- Nikolai Bortnik, Julia Zivert (authors of the song "Bestseller" performed by Max Barskih & Zivert)
- Ivan Zasidkevich, Mikhail Zasidkevich (authors of the songs "On the clock zero-zero" ("На часах ноль-ноль") and "The whole district will hear" ("Услышит весь район") performed by the band Dabro)
- Maria Boyko, Alexander Mikheev, Konstantin Koksharov, Egor Korablin (authors of the song "Pikachu" performed by Mia Boyka & Egor Ship)
- Artem Umrikhin, Dmitry Loren (authors of the song "Hysterical" ("Истеричка") performed by Artik & Asti)
- Dmitry Loren (author of the song "Dear" ("Родной") performed by Loboda)

Producers of the Year

- Yana Rudkovskaya (performer Dima Bilan)
- Bogdan Leonovich (performer Zivert)
- Artem Umrikhin (Artik & Asti group)
- Alexander Fomenkov, Evgeny Trukhin (performers Habib and Galibri & Mavik)
- Alisher Morgenshtern (Morgenshtern)
- Alyona Mikhailova, Liana Meladze (Yolka, Mari Kraimbrery)

Labels of the Year

- Warner Music Russia
- The Mikhail Gutseriev PC
- Effective Records

Hall of fame

Short list

- Artik & Asti
- Burito
- Filatov & Karas
- Zivert
- Andrey Gubin
- Basta
- Boris Grebenshchikov / Aquarium
- Diana Arbenina / Night Snipers
- Evgeny Khavtan / Bravo
- Zvonkiy
- Ilya Lagutenko / Mumiy Troll
- Max Barskih

== See also ==
- ZD Awards
- Russian pop music
- Pop music in Ukraine
