= Vadim Botnaruk =

Ukrainian and Russian musician, media manager, music producer

- Вадим Маркович Ботнарюк
- Born: April 10, 1953; Bălți, Moldavian SSR
- Died: January 19, 2008 (aged 54); Moscow, Russia
- Known for: Dialog project, TopHit, Russian Phonographic Association (RPA)

Vadim Markovich Botnaruk (April 10, 1953 – January 19, 2008) was a Soviet Moldavian-born Ukrainian and Russian musician, media manager, music producer (member of Dialog project) and one of the founders of TopHit scene monitoring project. He also served as Director General of the Russian Phonographic Association (RPA) since 2004 to 2008.

== Education, activities and death ==
Vadim Botnaruk was born in the town of Bălți in Moldavian SSR. He grew up and educated in Mykolayiv (Ukrainian SSR / Ukraine).

In 1976 he graduated from Admiral Makarov National University of Shipbuilding (then Nikolaev Shipbuilding Institute). Since 1975 he played in a local student music band called Gaudeamus. Since early 1980s he moved to another group called Orbita. Since 1997 until 2008 he lived and worked in Moscow, Russia.

On January 19, 2008, he died in a hospital in Moscow after being assaulted on January 15 by unknown criminals near house where he lived. His colleagues and mass media were generally consent that this was because of his professional activities at Russian Phonographic Association. He was trying to distribute money in favor of artists to stop unfair business practices, where businessmen hijacked artists' royalties via copyright manipulations. He was attacked before and received threats in the past.

== Career ==
In 1992 he became one of the founders and the Director of a radio station called Radio Set, the first non-state-owned broadcsaster in Mykolayiv, one of the first private stations in all Ukraine.

During 1990s, Vadim Botnaruk together with Kim Breitburg and Evgeny Fridland were organizing and implementing long-term project aimed to search and promote young talented musicians via local radio stations. The project was based on the 1969-formed Dialog band and was also called Dialog. Each of 50 participating stations were electing 2 songs of particular local artists, representing station's area. Songs were rotated on those 50 stations during half a year, and millions of listeners were voting for their favorites. The most prominent "graduates" of the Dialog project are Nikolai Trubach, Konstantin Meladze and Valery Meladze.

From 1997 to 2003 he headed a record label called ARS Records, that belonged to ARS media holding headed by prominent Soviet and Russian composer Igor Krutoy. Under Botnaruk's leadership, the label published hundreds of albums of popular Russian singers. Those include Andrei Gubin, Ruki Vverh!, Nikolai Trubach, Yuri Shatunov, Dima Bilan, Valeriy Meladze, Boris Moiseev, Diskoteka Avariya, VIA Gra, Valeriya, Premyer-Ministr, Danko, A'Studio, Laima Vaikule, Igor Krutoy, Philipp Kirkorov, Igor Nikolaev, Blestyashchiye and many others.

In 2003 he founded a company Novoye Vremya specialized in music producing.

In 2002–2003 he worked as producer for singer MakSim.

In 2002 until death in 2008 he actively helped to create and develop the TopHit project aimed at monitoring popularity of musicians on radio and on the Internet. The other co-founder of TopHit was Igor Kraev, who worked with Botnaruk at ARS Records.

Since 2004 he headed Russian Phonographic Association (RPA) specializing in collective management of related rights of musicians.
