= MTV Europe Music Award for Best Russian Act =

MTV award

The following is a list of the MTV Europe Music Award winners and nominees for Best Russian Act. The all-time winner in this category are Dima Bilan with 7 wins (in 2005–2010, 2012), followed by Nyusha with 2 wins (in 2011, 2014).

The leaders in the number of nominations:

- Dima Bilan — 7
- Kasta — 5
- t.A.T.u., Timati, Serebro — 4
- VIA Gra, Sergey Lazarev, Zemfira, Nyusha, Leningrad, Ivan Dorn, Yolka, Noize MC — 3

== Winners and nominees ==
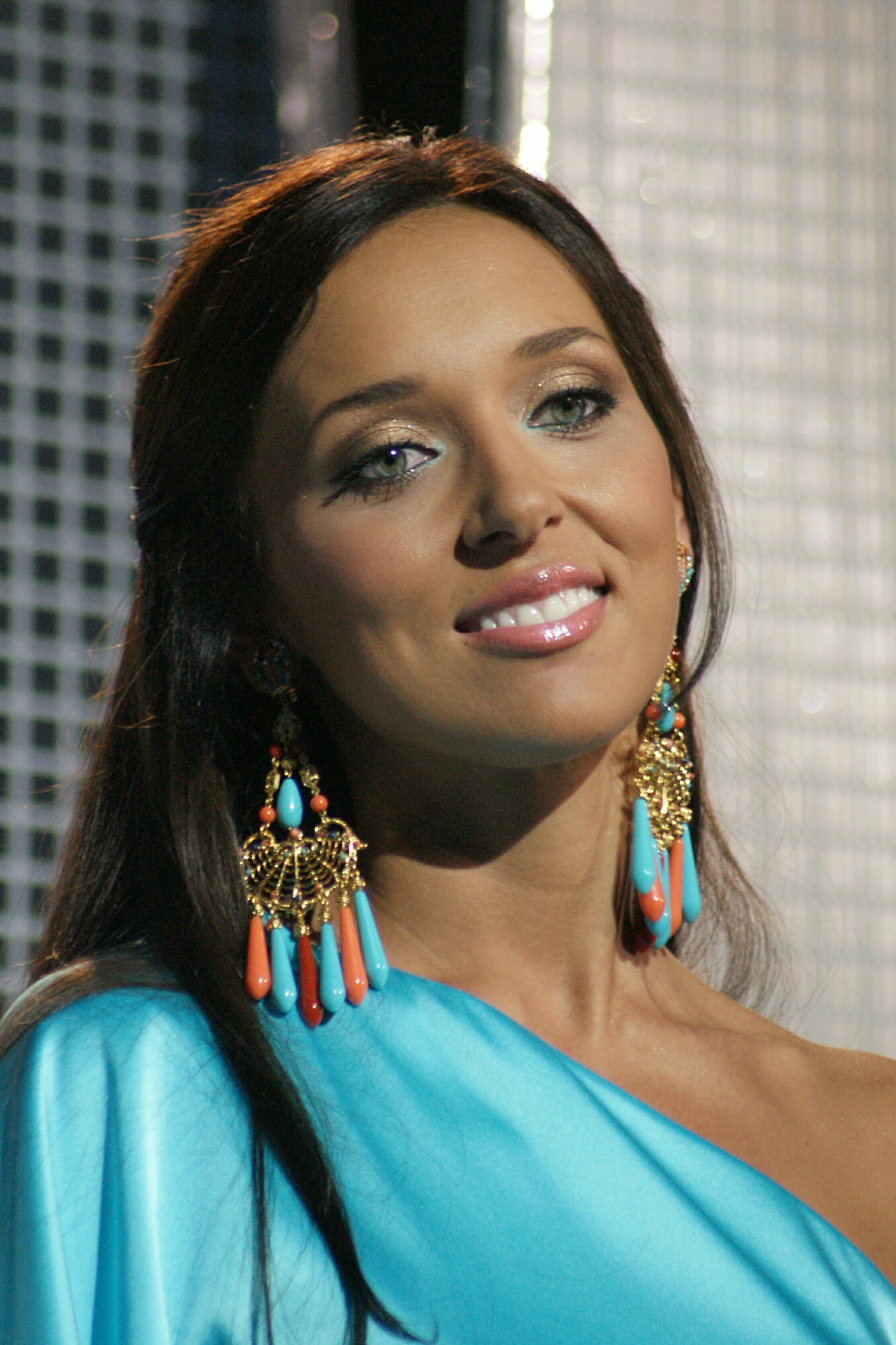
Alsou (winner in 2001)

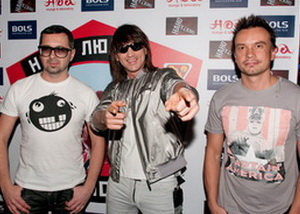
Diskoteka Avariya (winner in 2002)

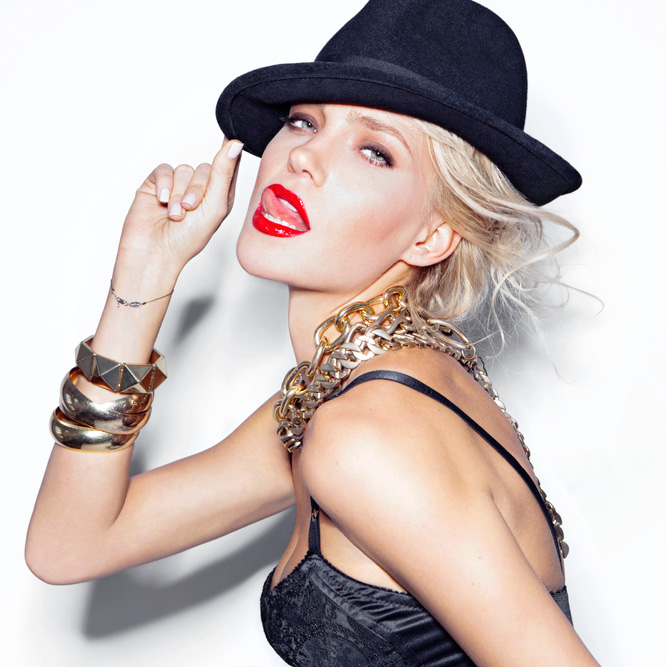
Glukoza (winner in 2003)

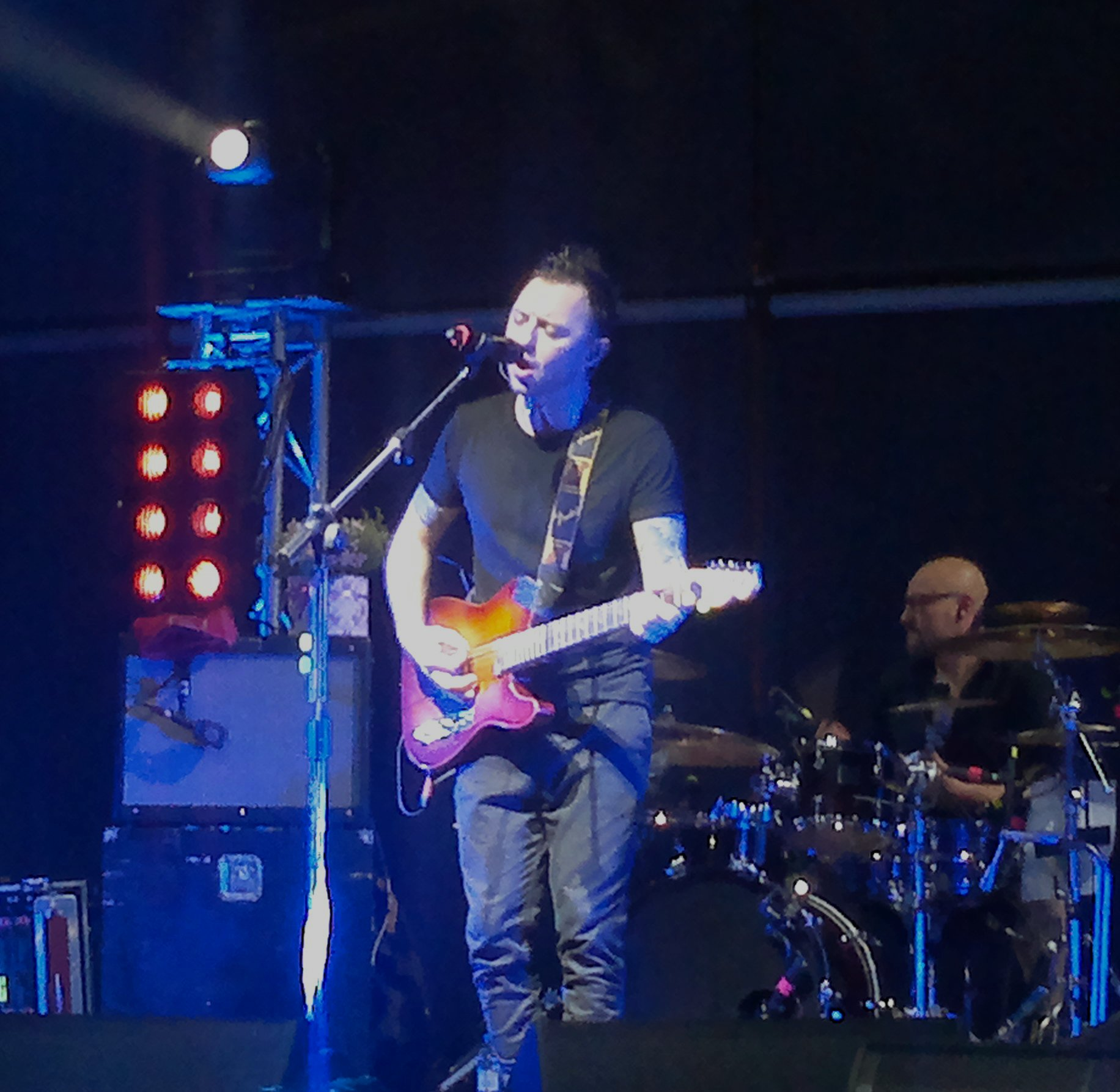
Zveri (winner in 2004)

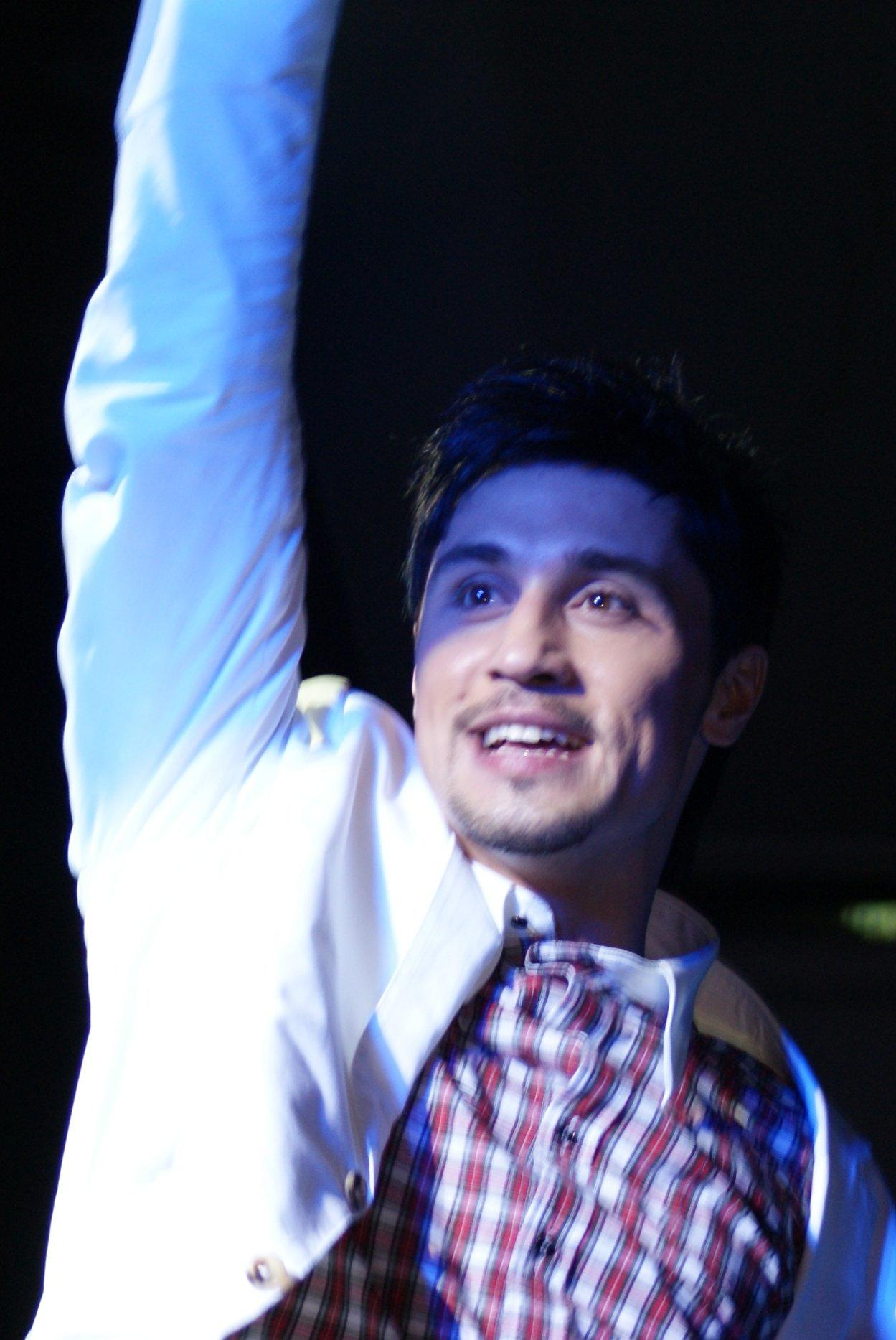
Dima Bilan (winner in 2005–2010, 2012)

Winners are listed first and highlighted in bold.

=== 1990s ===
Year	Artist	Ref
1994	**Bravo ^{[a]}**	

=== 2000s ===
Year	Artist	Ref
2001
2001	**Alsou**	
2001	Bi-2	
2001	Mumiy Troll	
2001	t.A.T.u.	
2001	Zemfira	
2002
2002	**Diskoteka Avariya**	
2002	Ariana	
2002	Epidemia	
2002	Kasta	
2002	t.A.T.u.	
2003
2003	**Glukoza**	
2003	Diskoteka Avariya	
2003	Leningrad	
2003	Splean	
2003	t.A.T.u.	
2004
2004	**Zveri**	
2004	Dolphin	
2004	Glukoza	
2004	Leningrad	
2004	VIA Gra	
2005
2005	**Dima Bilan**	
2005	VIA Gra	
2005	Uma2rman	
2005	Vyacheslav Butusov	
2005	Zemfira	
2006
2006	**Dima Bilan**	
2006	Gorod 312	
2006	Valeriy Meladze	
2006	t.A.T.u.	
2006	Uma2rman	
2007
2007	**Dima Bilan**	
2007	A-Studio	
2007	Sergey Lazarev	
2007	MakSim	
2007	VIA Gra	
2008
2008	**Dima Bilan**	
2008	Band'Eros	
2008	Sergey Lazarev	
2008	Timati	
2008	Nastya Zadorozhnaya	
2009
2009	**Dima Bilan**	
2009	Center	
2009	Kasta	
2009	Sergey Lazarev	
2009	Timati	

=== 2010s ===
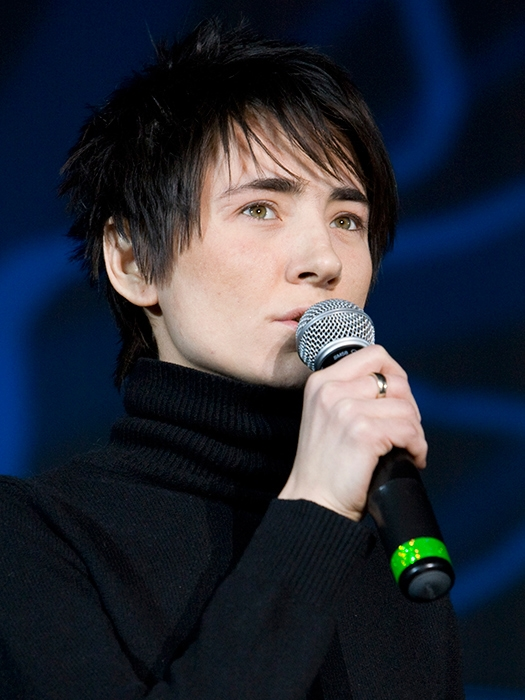
Zemfira (winner in 2013)

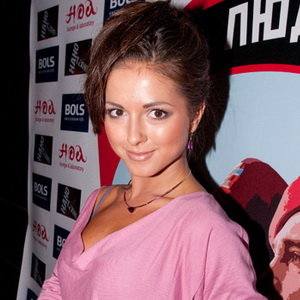
Nyusha (winner in 2011, 2014)

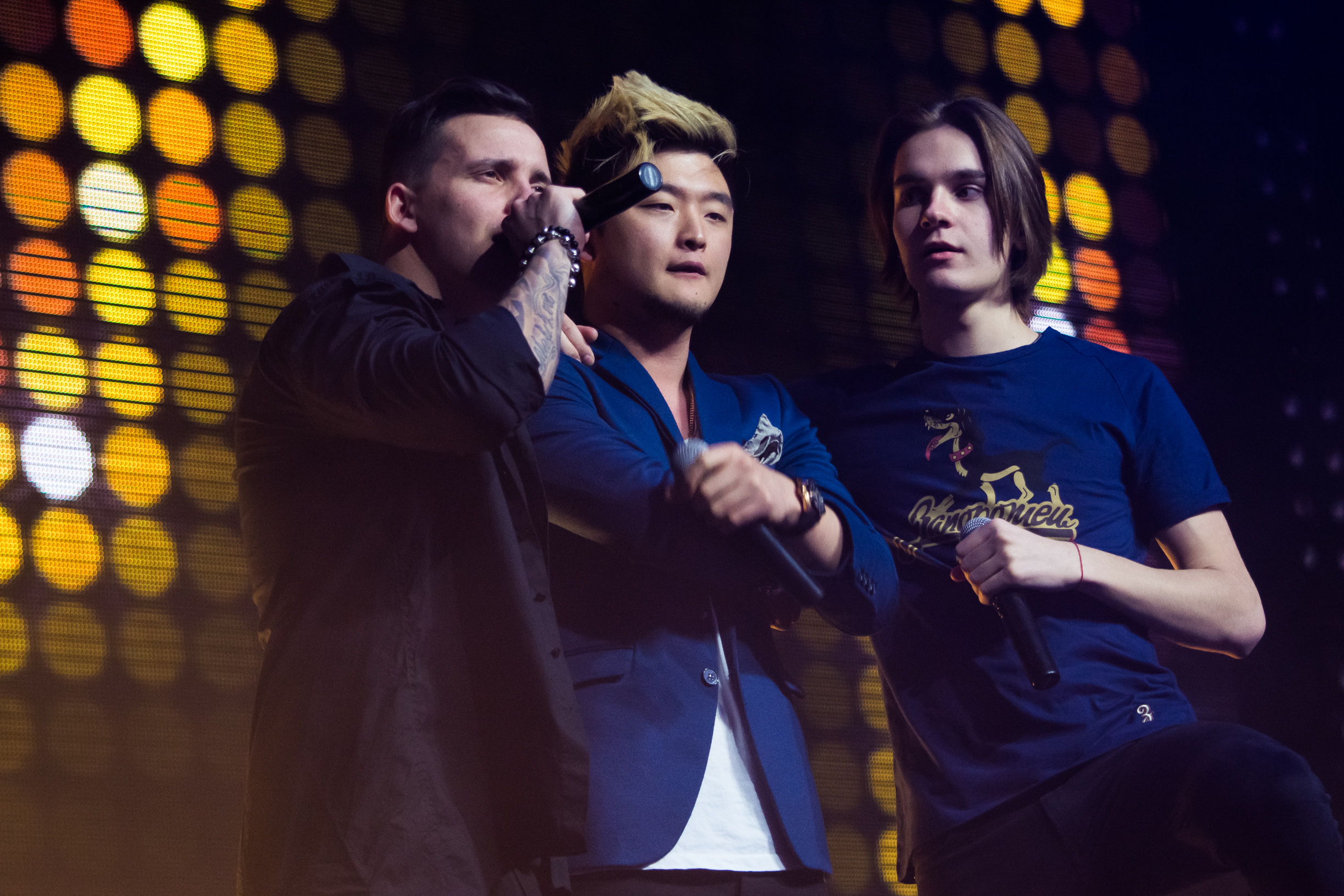
MBAND (winner in 2015)

Year	Artist	Ref
2010
2010	**Dima Bilan**	
2010	A-Studio	
2010	Noize MC	
2010	Serebro	
2010	Timati	
2011
2011	**Nyusha**	
2011	Gradusy	
2011	Kasta	
2011	Machete	
2011	Timati	
2012
2012	**Dima Bilan**	
2012	Kasta	
2012	Nervy	
2012	Serebro	
2012	Zhanna Friske	
2013
2013	**Zemfira**	
2013	Basta	
2013	Ivan Dorn	
2013	Nyusha	
2013	Yolka	
2014
2014	**Nyusha**	
2014	Serebro	
2014	Kasta	
2014	Noize MC	
2014	Bianka	
2015
2015	**MBAND**	
2015	IOWA	
2015	Quest Pistols	
2015	Serebro	
2015	Ivan Dorn	
2016
2016	**Therr Maitz**	
2016	Basta	
2016	Leningrad	
2016	OQJAV	
2016	Yolka	
2017
2017	**Ivan Dorn**	
2017	Elena Temnikova	
2017	Griby	
2017	Husky	
2017	Yolka	
2018
2018	**Jah Khalib**	
2018	Eldzhey	
2018	Pharaoh	
2018	Monetochka	
2018	We	
2019
2019	**Maruv**	
2019	Face	
2019	Little Big	
2019	Noize MC	
2019	Zivert	

=== 2020s ===
Year	Artist	Ref
2020
2020	**Niletto**	
2020	Cream Soda	
2020	Morgenshtern	
2020	Klava Koka	
2020	Manizha	
2021
2021	**Max Barskih**	
2021	Musia Totibadze	
2021	Imanbek	
2021	Mari Kraimbrery	
2021	Slava Marlow	

^{^[a]}Local Hero Award — Russia

== See also ==
- MTV VMA International Viewer's Choice Award for MTV Russia
- MTV Russia Music Awards
