= Igor Kraev =

Russian-Ukrainian music producer (born 1963)

- Игорь Евгеньевич Краев
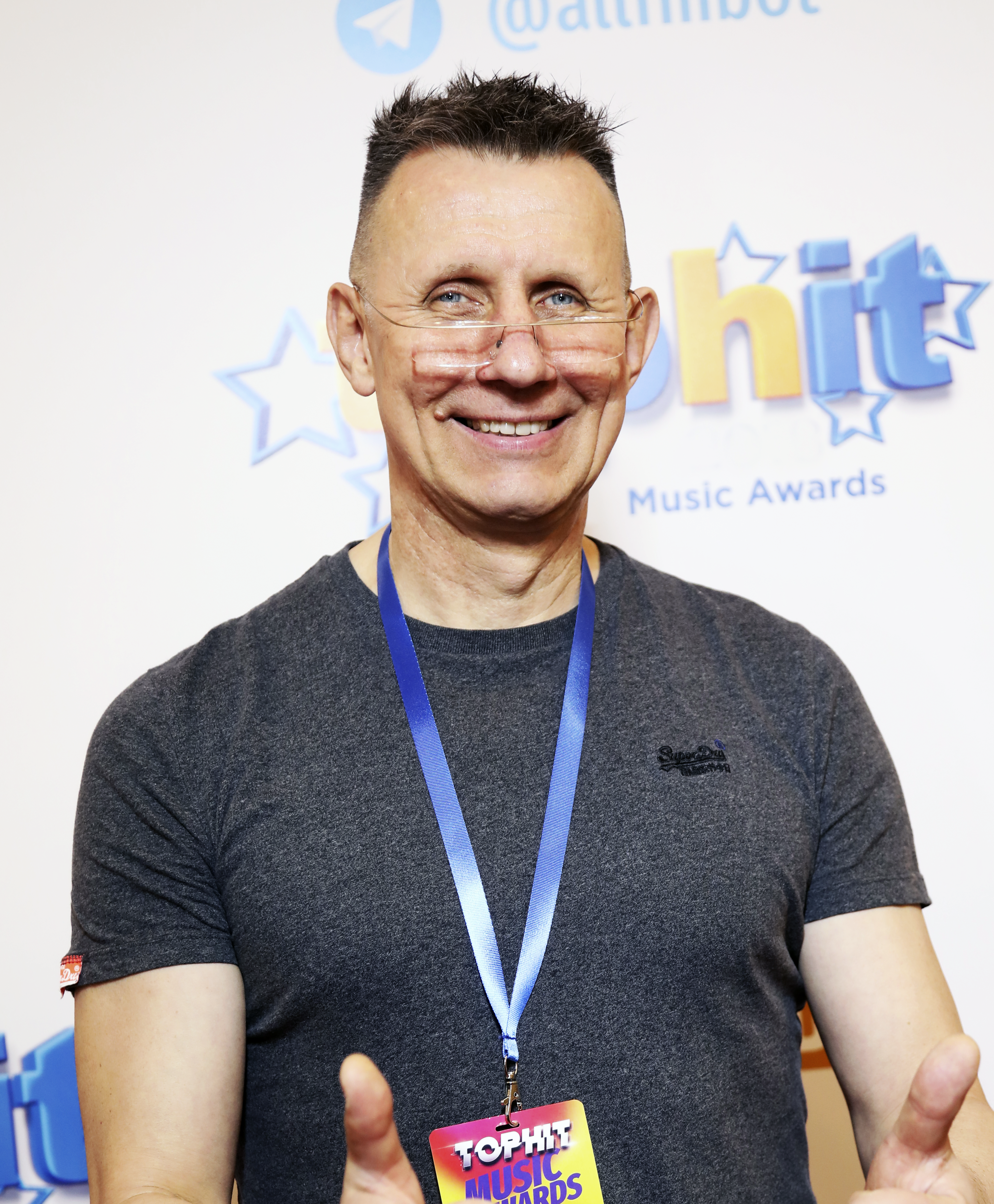
- Born: April 11, 1963 (age 63); Sochi
- Other name: Ігор Євгенович Краєв
- Occupations: producer, music promoter, entrepreneur, musician
- Known for: TopHit, Top Hit Music Awards

Igor Evgenievich Kraev (Russian: Игорь Евгеньевич Краев) or Ihor Evgenovich Kraiev (Ukrainian: Ігор Євгенович Краєв), is a Ukrainian and Russian producer, music promoter, entrepreneur, founder and CEO of TopHit project (founded in 2003), a music promotion platform and music chart authority for thousands of music artists and labels, 1200+ radio stations worldwide, mostly in Europe, Ukraine, Russia and the CIS.

== Early career ==
Kraev was born on April 11, 1963, in Sochi, Krasnodar krai, USSR. He moved to Sevastopol (then-USSR) in early childhood. In 1986, he graduated from Sevastopol instrument-making institute (now Sevastopol National Technical University) as a shipbuilding engineer.

He started making music in school times. He created his own band in school, and later, while a student, he played in popular Sevastopol youth bands Skif and Panorama. In 1986-87 he acted as keyboardist, arranger and vocalist at the rock band Stadion. In 1987 he participated in making of eponymous album by that group, which in 1989 was published by monopolist Soviet record company Melodiya.

In 1988 he returned to Panorama band which was functioning in Lunacharsky Sevastopol Drama Theatre. Igor Kraev wrote music for several plays by theatre director Roman Markholia that were later staged in theatres of Sevastopol, Riga and Kyiv, one of them "Rag Dolly" by William Gibson. Also, he, together with Vitaly Lvov and Yekaterina Trotsenko, participated in creation of orchestrations for Leonard Bernstein's "Candide" musical, staged in USSR for the first time in Kyiv and Sevastopol.

In 1989–90 he participated in rock band Li.Der of Sevastopol, where recorded the album "Money for faith" as keyboardist and arranger. The album was also released by Melodiya in 1991. During this period he also recorded his solo album called "Sombatkhey" where he acted as composer, arranger and vocalist.

In 1992, together with Aleksei Mikhailusev and Sergey Bogdan, he created professional recording studio called "Zurbagan", the first in Sevastopol. Acted as producer, musician and arranger. From 1991 until 1997 he also was producing music group called "Zurbagan" and recorded several songs that became local hits.

In 1996 he began to work as independent producer at "Crimea Radio Roks", one of the first music FM radios in region. In 1997 he became music editor and later program director of that radio.

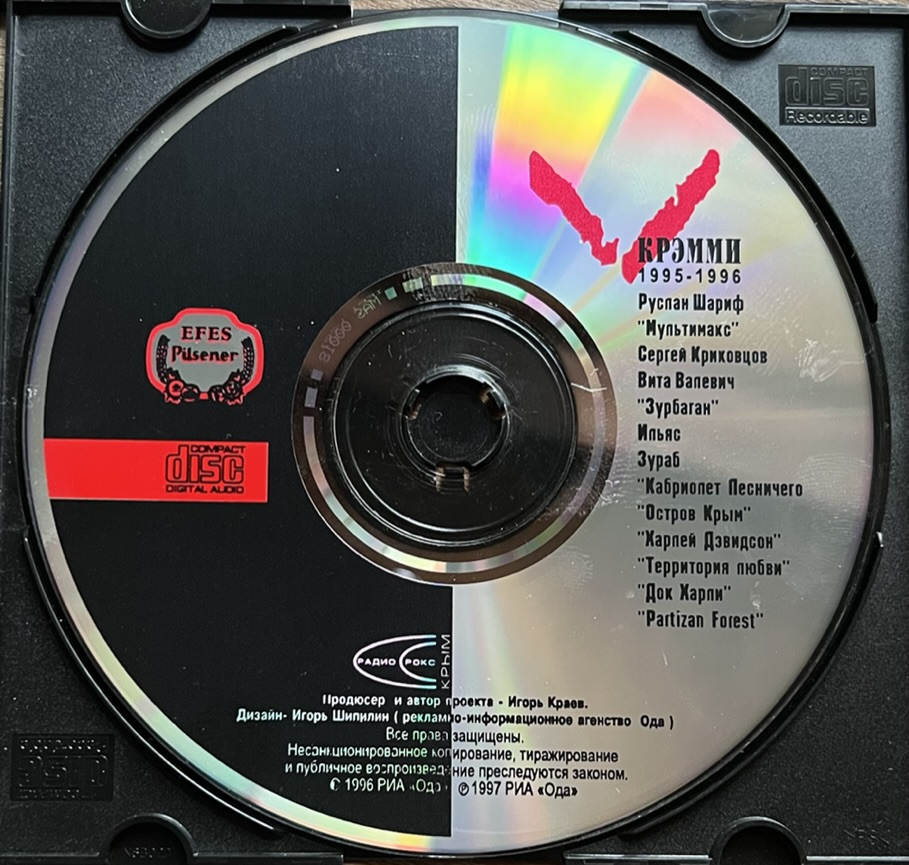
Crammy festival music CD produced by Igor Kraev in 1997

In 1996–97 he was one of the organizers of music festival "Crammy" where Crimean and Russian music groups participated. In 1997 produced creation of music CD with greatest hits of that festival.

Also, during that period, Igor Kraev was a participant of Dialog project which was founded by Vadim Botnaruk, Kim Breitburg and Evgeniy Fridland on the base of USSR-time progressive rock band Dialog. The project was aimed to search and promote young singers via regional radio stations. Popular Russian-language singers Nikolai Trubach, Konstantin Meladze and Valeriy Meladze gained their initial popularity through that project.

In 1999 Igor Kraev left Crimea and began to work in Moscow as PR manager and later PR director of recording studio "ARS Records" of the holding company "ARS" headed by prominent Russian composer Igor Krutoy. At the position, he took part in issuing albums of tens of popular singers of Russian and Ukrainian popular music scene. Among them Andrey Gubin, Ruki Vverh, Nikolai Trubach, Yuri Shatunov, Dima Bilan, Valeriy Meladze, Boris Moiseev, Diskoteka Avariya, VIA Gra, Valeriya, Premyer-Ministr, Danko, A'Studio, Laima Vaikule, Igor Krutoy, Philipp Kirkorov, Igor Nikolayev, Blestyashchiye, and many others.

== TopHit ==
In March 2003 he left ARS together with Vadim Botnaruk, former ARS Records CEO. They launched mp3fm.ru, the online platform to help young musicians get their songs played on the radio. Mp3fm.ru quickly gained popularity with performers, record labels, and radio stations. It led to hijacking of the domain name mp3fm.ru, so the crew was forced to rename the project to TopHit which is known under this name nowadays. In 2004, TopHit began publishing weekly updated radio charts of songs and artists. In 2015, in addition to radio charts, TopHit began to publish YouTube charts, and from 2021 Spotify charts. TopHit became known among Russian and Ukrainian musicians as "professional tool" for musicians, without being widely known among the general public.

The co-founder of TopHit, Vadim Botnaruk, started working as the CEO of the Russian Phonographic Association (RPA), one of the Russian PRO in 2004. In early 2008, Vadim Botnaryuk died after being assassinated by an assailant who could not be found. He was allegedly killed for preventing one of the ethnic criminal groups from establishing control over royalties to performers and record labels for the use of their phonograms in the public sphere.

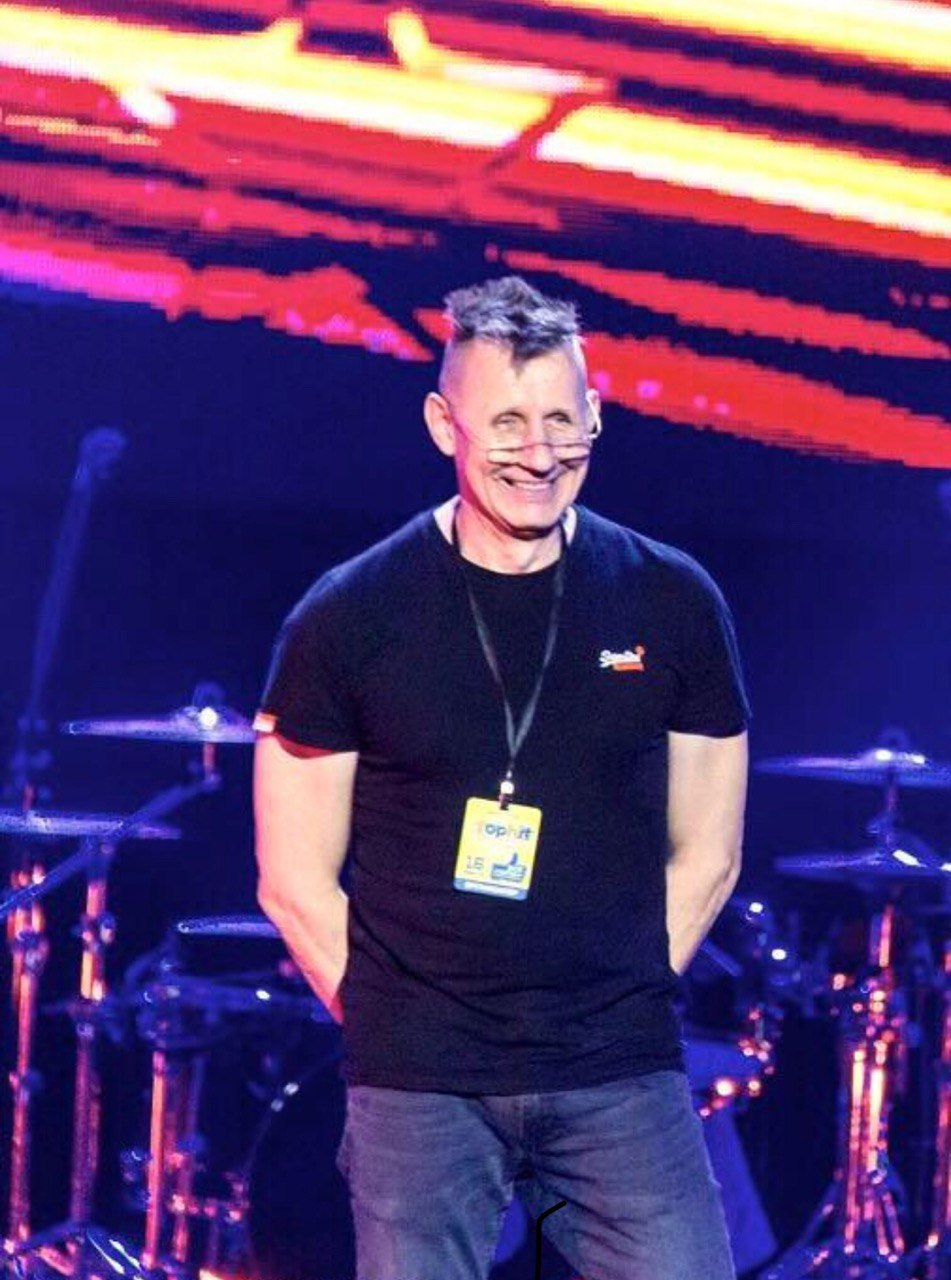
Igor Kraev hosts a Top Hit Music Awards ceremony

In 2009 Igor Kraev invented and launched the online testing of new songs by radio stations on TopHit, which allowed artists and labels to better understand the prospects for rotation of their songs on the radio.

In order to popularize the platform, Igor Kraev and Pavel Balashov together with the Russian music TV channel Muz TV initiated the production and broadcasting of the music hit parade Top Hit Chart. The radio version of the Сhart has been airing weekly on dozens of radio stations in Russia and CIS countries since 2010. The radio show is hosted by popular Russian artists Timur Rodriguez and Mitya Fomin. In different years they were joined by Nyusha, Dmitry Koldun, Eva Polna, Burrito, DJ Smash, Anita Tsoi, Filatov & Karas as the hosts of the radio show. Currently, the young artists: Vanya Dmitrienko, Lyusya Chebotina, Habib Sharipov, members of the Dabro band, are among the chart hosts.

Igor Kraev spent 2014-2016 in California, where he was being recruited as an adviser to a number of content startups.

In 2013, Igor Kraev and Pavel Balashov, head of TopHit Russia, established the Top Hit Music Awards Russia and the TopHit Hall of Fame. These awards are given to the local and international artists, songwriters, record labels, whose hits are most frequently heard on the radio and listened to on Spotify, and whose music videos are most frequently viewed on YouTube. Because of its objectivity and relevance, the Top Hit Music Awards have gained authority in professional music circles in Russia.

Since 2016, Igor Kraev has given a series of lectures in Moscow and Kyiv on using the Internet to promote new artists and their music.

Since 2020 TopHit Ukraine has been presenting Top Hit Music Awards Ukraine to the most popular Ukrainian artists, songwriters, producers and labels on the air and on the Internet.

In the fall of 2017, Igor Kraev initiated the launch of his own TopHit service for monitoring radio station airwaves, TopHit Spy. In 2019, Igor Kraev and Pavel Balashov founded their own TopHit record label, and in 2020 they launched TopHit Pay, a service for collecting donations for artists and authors on the platform.

In 2018-2019, Igor Kraev and Pavel Balashov founded several international companies to expand the platform's operations in the European, U.S. and Latin American markets.

In July 2022, Igor Kraev announced the buyout of the domain tophit.com and the upcoming integration of the company's services on this domain.
