= TopHit =

Internet platform for music distribution, airplay monitoring, and chart publishing

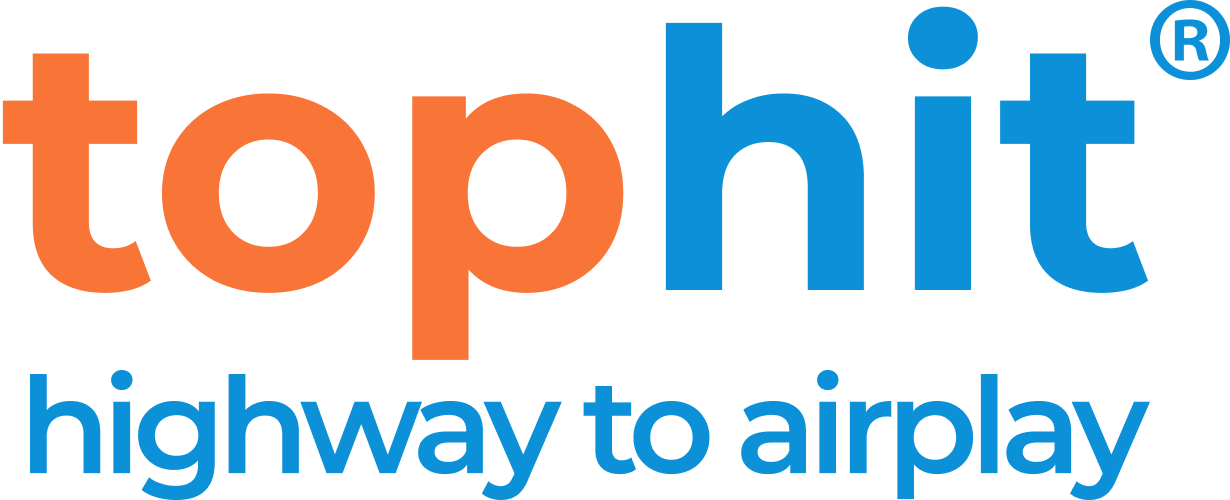
- Industry: Music industry & Media
- Founded: March 2003; 23 years ago
- Founders: Igor Kraev, Vadim Botnaruk
- Headquarters: San Jose, CA, United States
- Key people: Igor Kraev, Pavel Balashov
- Website: tophit.com

TopHit.com is a worldwide-oriented music chart website that includes internet platform for music distribution and airplay monitoring with generation of charts. As of 2024, TopHit has over 9,000 artists, songwriters, DJs, record labels, and music publishers. TopHit's services are utilized by more than 2,500 radio stations and 90 television channels across 45 countries, primarily in the US, UK, EU, Ukraine, Russia and the CIS. The platform's content library includes over 200,000 radio hit songs and more than 10,000 music videos. Universal Music has described TopHit as the most authoritative site for airplay monitoring in Russia. TopHit has been referenced by music critics and music producers as a key source for tracking the popularity of artists in Russia and the CIS.

Annually TopHit.com holds the live Top Hit Music Awards music ceremony that recognize the top radio and internet performers and their most popular hits, celebrating outstanding contributions to the music industry.

== Functionality ==
TopHit is a social network-like internet platform for aggregating, distributing and promoting digital music content. Authors, artists, producers and record labels upload their works to TopHit website. Music radio stations and TV channels examine uploaded songs and are able to download the ones they find suitable for airing. Representatives of labels watch new artists and songs using TopHit to determine most interesting ones to work further with them.

The website's own automated service TopHit Spy is aimed to monitor music broadcast at partner radio stations and to generate statistics of aired music. This data is used to form summary radio charts. As well, similar charts for YouTube and Spotify are available. Detailed play statistics for each song are given to rights holders — artists, authors, publishers and labels.

=== Formation of the TopHit content database ===
Producers and rights holders of musical content, upon registering with TopHit, upload their new works, phonograms and music videos to the platform. The TopHit content database is organized into two primary sections: Music Arrivals (featuring 600–800 successfully tested new releases from the past two months) and Golden Hits (comprising over 200,000 radio hits from the past 30 years). Approximately 60% of these songs are in English, while the remainder are performed in Russian, Spanish, German, Romanian, Ukrainian, Korean, and other languages.

=== Testing new songs ===
Since 2009, TopHit has introduced online testing of all music arrivals. On the Homepage and the Music Arrivals page of TopHit, all new songs undergo testing. The testing procedure consists of listening to a short demo version of a new track and then giving a "like" or "dislike" rating.

When forming a track's rating, TopHit considers both the song's parameters and the profiles of the radio stations or labels evaluating it. Ratings from radio stations, streaming platforms, and labels carry the most weight. After 2–3 days of testing, each track receives a rating on a 10-point scale.

The primary goal of testing is to help creators and rights holders objectively assess the potential of their hits before release and to select those for further promotion that have received the best feedback and ratings from music industry and media pros.

All preliminary song ratings on TopHit have a limited "shelf life." If a track does not get airplay on the radio or gain traction on the internet within six months after testing on TopHit, its "test" rating is reset. Subsequent ratings will only increase based on the accumulation of radio airplay, YouTube views, and streams on platforms like Spotify. Therefore, the highest ratings ultimately belong to tracks that have garnered the most radio airplay, YouTube views, and Spotify streams.

=== Song distribution and artist promotion ===
Promising tracks are downloaded by radio stations, added to their music libraries, and placed into rotation. Authors, artists, and labels can view detailed statistics on radio station activities concerning their content.

Label representatives use TopHit charts and music statistics to monitor the emergence of interesting new music and performers. They then reach out to the artists' representatives to discuss potential collaboration opportunities.

=== Monitoring airplay: TopHit Spy ===
TopHit Spy is an automated airplay monitoring system designed to identify the most frequently played songs. Operating 24/7 in real-time, TopHit Spy tracks the broadcasts of over 2,500 radio stations across 45 countries and collects streaming statistics from Spotify and YouTube.

The data gathered by TopHit Spy provides authors, performers, and rights holders on TopHit with detailed airplay and streaming statistics for their works and recordings. Additionally, it generates comprehensive airplay and streaming charts.

=== TopHit Music Charts ===
Based on the data collected, TopHit publishes airplay and streaming charts for the United States, the United Kingdom, Spain, Germany, Poland, Lithuania, Latvia, Estonia, Russia, Belarus, Kazakhstan, Ukraine, Moldova, and Romania. The platform also releases consolidated charts reflecting airplay and streaming statistics from all the countries where TopHit operates, including data from YouTube and Spotify.

TopHit charts are categorized into Radio Charts, YouTube Charts, Spotify Charts, and the All Media Chart, which uses both airplay and streaming data. Chart positions can represent tracks/videos (singles chart) or artists (artists chart).

Charts on TopHit are updated on a weekly, monthly, quarterly, annual, and decadal basis. Subscribers to TopHit have access to reports (charts) for individual radio stations, extended charts with up to 500 positions, and charts for ongoing periods, such as the current week, month, and year.

The TopHit Golden Hits section (music archive) is formatted as a consolidated chart of the most popular singles of the 21st century.

==== Chart milestones ====
- Dima Bilan and David Guetta are found to be the most aired musicians. They each have over 30 million of registered airplays.
- MakSim is the only singer in the chart's history, who has had four number one songs within a calendar year ("Отпускаю", "Знаешь ли ты", "Ветром стать", "Мой рай" in 2007).
- MakSim has had seven consecutive number one hits, which is considered an unbreakable record for other artists.
- Elka is the only artist to have topped the Annual General Chart twice and Annual Russian Chart three times on Tophit.
- Elka is the only Russian artist who topped all of the Tophit charts simultaneously, in 2010–2011.
- "Provence", performed by Elka, spent 109 weeks on Tophit General 100.
- Yulia Savicheva is the only artist to self-replace at the top of Tophit Audience Choice Chart.
- "Love You Like a Love Song" by Selena Gomez & the Scene holds the record as the longest-running chart-toper of the Tophit single chart, spending 20 weeks at the first spot.

== Top Hit Music Awards ==
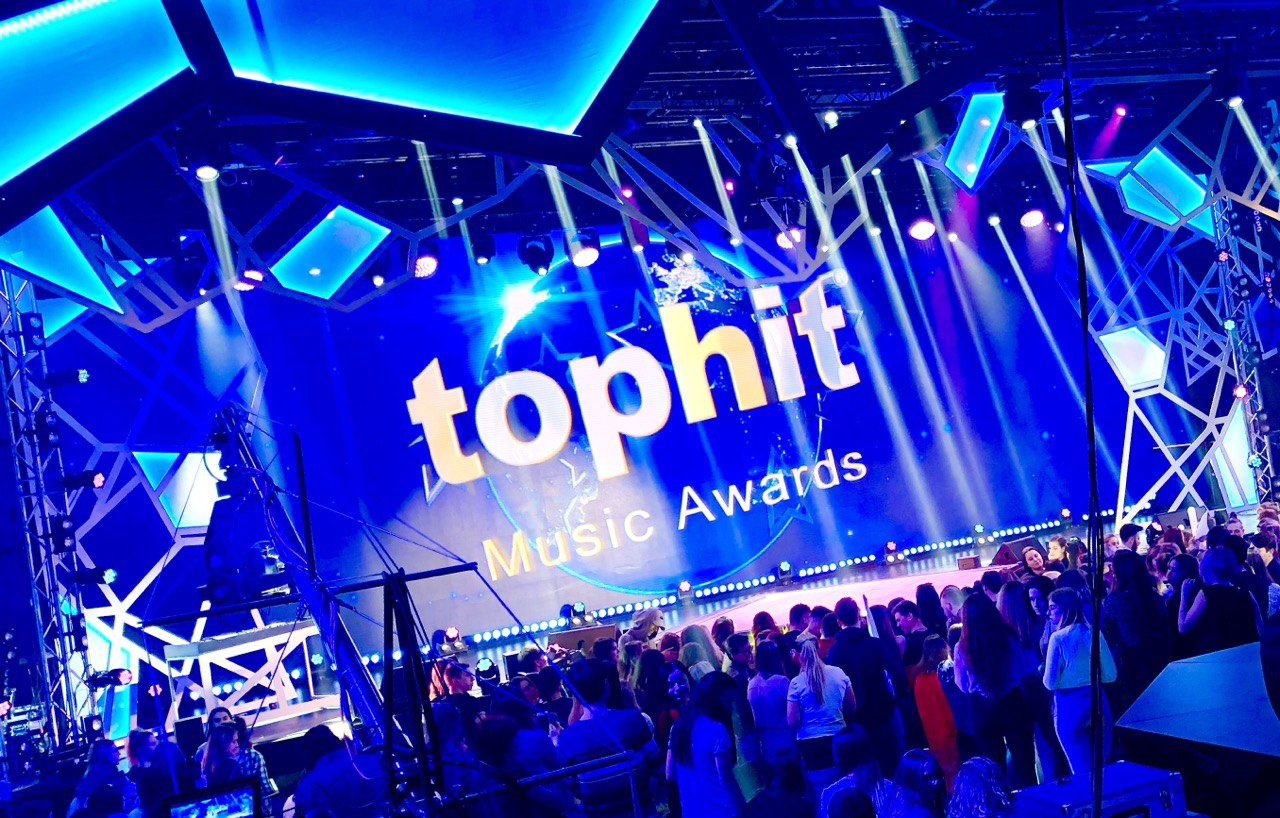
Top Hit Music Awards stage

Top Hit Music Awards is an annual awards ceremony established by TopHit in 2013. Russian artists, authors and producers are honored for outstanding achievements in popular music and record business, based on the data of song rotation on air of the radio stations. Ceremonies are held annually in Moscow. In April 2020, for the first time, the Top Hit Music Awards Ukraine recognized the best performers, authors, and record labels in Ukraine.

Yolka singer, one of the most popular Russian singers, honors Top Hit Music Awards as a tool for determining artists by their real statistical popularity, not by decisions of some jury. This also emphasizes professional nature of the award. Yolka was awarded multiple times, including "Artist of the decade award", as Top Hit measurements show that she is extremely popular among Russian-speaking listeners with over 19 million of airplays in 10 years.

There is a Top Hit Hall of Fame as a part of the award. Every year 10 nominees are announced by partnering radio stations, determined by voting. Then past Hall of Fame members elect 2 of them.

TimeOut showbiz magazine coined the ceremony a metaphor of "Unbiased Prize of Numbers which is based exceptionally on statistics and is not subject to objections".

== Recognition ==
Experts from the InterMedia news agency, Evgeny Safronov and Aleksey Mazhaev, expressed the opinion that the charts published by the portal could not fully reflect the artist popularity in Russia, as Tophit along with Moskva.FM deal with radio industry research. Nevertheless, the experts qualified the portal hit parades as professional. Boris Barabanov also marked that Tophit.ru activity is more familiar to the music industry professionals than public at large. "One of the most effective chart-based sources is Tophit.ru. It's rather a reliable, in professional circles, mechanism that allows the rightholders to place their compositions on the website and make them available for station download. The latter ones, in their turn, having downloaded the song, send reports on its rotation, if this song is put on air, which shows its popularity. Tophit.ru promotion model is considered very effective on the market," wrote the author. Guru Ken called Tophit the leader in the area of media content delivery to radio stations. In the journal Kompania (Company), Anastasia Markina also mentioned the portal as the leader in its professional sphere and wrote, "Tophit.ru took under its wing over 400 stations and 60 TV-channels. On the other hand, over a thousand rights holders, among which are the majority of record labels, including the majors Sony Music, Universal Music, Warner Music and EMI/Gala Records», work with this website."

In RMA (a course of lectures for professionals in the music business), Dmitry Konnov, Universal Music Russia CEO, speaking of Russian music promotion perspectives, underlined the fact that "if you want to reach popularity, I advise to write and perform Russian music, promote Russian artists and keep a close watch at Tophit.ru but not get lost in admiration at Billboard".

In 2010, the summary statistical data of the portal for the year of 2009 became the foremost source in defining the nominees for "Bog Efira" (Air God) Music Awards (a music version of Popov's Award in the area of radio broadcast). Tophit annual charts are also covered in the mass media.

== History ==
The idea of the TopHit project came out of the 1978-formed Soviet music band called Dialog. Members of the bang Kim Breitburg, Evgeniy Fridland and Vadim Botnaruk invented a system for searching for young talented musicians and promoting them via partnering radio stations. During the 1990s, over 50 stations participated and their audience voted for the best new artists. The most known of them so far are Nikolai Trubach, Konstantin Meladze and Valeriy Meladze.

Vadim Botnaruk worked at one of the radio stations, and in 2002 he joined efforts with his colleague Igor Kraev to use Internet for artist searching and voting for new hits. They established an Internet service for this, with the help of a record label ARS Records managed by Igor Krutoy. In early 2003 they entitled it mp3fm.ru.

Initially the website partnered with over 50 local radio stations, many new artists and some Russian showbiz establishment figures such as Alena Sviridova, Vladimir Kuzmin, Leonid Agutin, Alla Pugachova, Murat Nasyrov, Ilya Lagutenko. On 1 November 2003, the domain mp3fm.ru was intercepted and re-registered. The team qualified this as corporate raid and established a new domain name and brand: TopHit.ru.

In January 2004, TopHit's first annual chart was published (for 2003). TopHit determined that the most popular song among Russian-speaking listeners was "Ocean and three rivers" by Valeriy Meladze and VIA Gra. At the time, major radio networks began to join: Russkoye Radio Ukraine and international holding Europa Plus. They were shortly followed by AvtoRadio, Love Radio, Radio Maximum, Nashe Radio and others.

TopHit Live! concert was for the 1st time held in Moscow in April 2004. In 2005 TopHit became partners with record labels Sony Music Entertainment, Universal Music and Warner Music. In 2006, the number of partner radio stations exceeded 400. In 2007, TopHit received the professional Popov Award for "great contribution in development of Russian radio abroad". Also from 2007, TopHit began to process music videos.

In January 2008 one of the founders, Vadim Botnaruk, was killed by unknown criminals near his home in Moscow.

In 2010 TopHit started its Ukrainian branch with registering of trademark. Also in 2010 all new music became available for radios in uncompressed .wav format. 2010 was also the year when TopHit Chart online shows were introduced. In April 2010, TopHit held a concert in Kyiv, Top Hit Live! featuring Svetlana Loboda, Gaitana, Alyona Vinnytska and other stars of the Ukrainian pop scene.

In 2011 Igor Kraev published his first analysis of radio scene in Russia based on TopHit's substantial amount of statistics.

In January 2012, the final TopHit Ukraine radio charts for 2011 were published for the first time. The most popular artists on Ukrainian radio were Vera Brezhneva, Potap, Yolka and Ani Lorak. The most rotated hits were "Petals of Tears" by Dan Balan & Vera Brezhneva, "Real Life" by Vera Brezhneva and "You're the Best" by Vlad Darwin & Alyosha.

In 2013 the Top Hit Music Awards ceremony was held for the first time. Top Hit Hall of Fame was launched simultaneously. In 2015, TopHit became partners with Google to produce YouTube-based music charts: YouTube Russia and Radio & YouTube Russia. The next year music video charts were added along with charts Top 100 Radio & YouTube Artists Russia, Top 200 Radio & YouTube Hits Russia.

In 2017, TopHit Spy service was launched to monitor music on partner radios automatically (over 800 stations by that time). In 2019 there were more than 1000 stations and project's geography expanded onto 30 countries of Europe, Asia, Middle East and the United States. TopHit's own record label started to work also in 2019.

In January 2019, TopHit published the annual YouTube Ukraine charts for the first time: the artist and video charts, and the Radio & YouTube Ukraine charts. The main hit of these charts was the song "Plakala" by KAZKA.

In 2020 TopHit Pay payment system was launched. Its main purpose is collection of donations for musicians. In 2021, TopHit became partners with Spotify streaming service to provide more charts.

In March 2023, the Internet portal was re-launched under the new domain name tophit.com; a concert was held to commemorate.
