= Poshlaya Molly =

Ukrainian rock group

Poshlaya Molly Пошлая Молли

Background information
- Origin: Kharkiv Oblast, Ukraine
- Genres: Pop-punk; electropunk
- Years active: 2016–present

Poshlaya Molly (Russian: По́шлая Мо́лли) is a Ukrainian rock-band, founded by musician Kirill Timoshenko, better known under his pseudonym Kirill Bledny. It was officially founded in 2016, but its origins date back to 2014. The band is one of the most prominent synth-punk music groups in Ukraine, combining pop-punk with electronic music.

== History ==
At one of the band's performances, they expected an audience of around 150 people, but about 400 ultimately attended, even though the band had prepared only three songs. Timoshenko did not invest in promoting the project; instead, its popularity grew as listeners on VKontakte discovered and took an interest in the band.

On August 30, 2024, Poshlaya Molly released the single "Hell's Lullaby," their first release in two years. On October 11, 2024, a new EP titled RATT#WHORE was released.

== Discography ==
=== Studio albums ===
- 2017 — "8 способов как бросить дрочить"

=== EPs ===
- 2018 — "Грустная девчонка с глазами как у собаки"
- 2018 — «Очень страшная Молли 3 (Часть 1)»
- 2020 — Paycheck
- 2024 — Ratt#Whore
