= Yolka (singer) =

Ukrainian-born Russian singer (born 1982)

- Ёлка
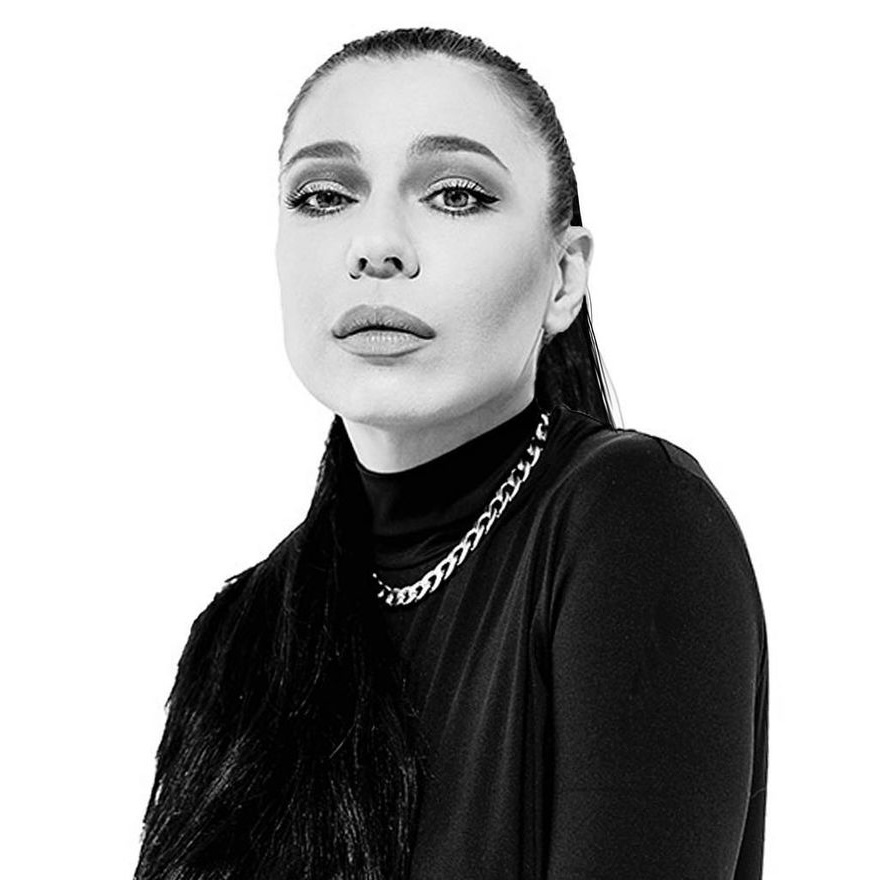
- Yolka in 2019
- Born: Elizaveta Valdemarovna Ivantsiv; 2 July 1982 (age 44); Uzhhorod, Ukrainian SSR, USSR
- Occupations: Singer; presenter
- Years active: 2004–present
- Musical career
- Genres: Pop; R&B; alternative rock
- Instrument: Vocals
- Labels: 100PRO (2004—2009); Velvet Music (2010—present)
- Website: www.elkasinger.ru

Elizaveta Valdemarovna Ivantsiv (Russian: Елизаве́та Вальдема́ровна Иванци́в; Ukrainian: Єлизаве́та Вальдема́рівна Іванці́в, romanized: Yelizaveta Valdemarivna Ivantsiv; born 2 July 1982), known professionally as Yolka (Russian: Ёлка, "Spruce"), is a Ukrainian-born Russian singer and presenter.

Raised in Uzhhorod, she started her musical career with R&B band. After that, she signed to the label 100PRO and producer Vlad Valov and released her debut album City of Deception (Russian: Город обмана), which included major hits "Girl in Peugeot" and "High Spirits" as for as album was proved a success. Afterwards Yolka released albums Shadows and This Gorgeous World in collaboration with Valov, which was unsuccessful.

Since 2010 to 2012, she was a judge in Ukrainian version of popular show The X Factor. Yolka's breakthrough came after the viral success of her single "Provence" in 2011. She was nominated in three categories at the annual Muz-TV Music Awards 2011. Her fourth studio album Points Are Collocated (Russian: Точки расставлены) was released in 2012 and received widespread critical acclaim. Several Russian critics called it 2012's best album. Also magazines such as Afisha, Time Out and Interview included Points Are Collocated on their year-end top lists.

Yolka has fourthly received Golden Gramophone Award (for songs "Handsome Man", "Provence", "Next to You" and "Fly, Liza"); she was nominated for MTV's Russia Music Awards. In 2011 she was recognized as Singer of the Year by Glamour magazine and among top-ten of the most successful people in Ukrainian show business, according to the Focus magazine. In the same year she won in category Singer of the Year at the annual ZD Awards by Moskovskij Komsomolets. In 2016 she won the "Best Female Singer in Popular Music" Award at the Russian National Music Awards. In 2019 she became a singer at WorldSkills (section "Experiment": the speaker - is the inventor Pranav Mistry, the artist - Denis Semionov).

In 2020, as part of the Top Hit Music Awards, she received the title of "Artist of the Decade", as the statistical music service TopHit found that "over the past 10 years, her songs have been played on the air of various radio stations about 19 million times".

== Early life ==
She was born on 2 July 1982 in Uzhhorod. At first she studied at secondary school No. 8 in Uzhhorod, and graduated from school No. 19. She grew up in a musical family, father - Valdemar Mironovich Ivantsiv (d. June 13, 2012, Uzhhorod) - a collector of jazz music, mother - Marina Eduardovna Lyashenko - a musician playing three instruments, grandparents sang in the Transcarpathian folk choir, Elizaveta sang in the school choir, then moved to the vocal circle at the Palace of Pioneers. While studying at school, she took part in the school KVN. Gained local popularity thanks to the KVN team of Uzhgorod schoolchildren "Ward No. 6", in 2001–2003 transformed into the team of Uzhgorod and Vinnitsa. According to the performer, she did not invent her pseudonym on purpose. From the age of eleven, everyone began to call her Yolka, after “one of my friends blurted out:“ Yolka ”, someone heard - and away we go”[16]. “... Yes, I have not responded to my name since the age of eleven. Even mom calls Yolochka. Only dad remembers everything and reacts very inadequately when my friends forget my name. He immediately lists all the vegetation of the Red Book to them, especially when they call at night, ”said the artist.

She studied vocal classes at the music school, but did not finish. According to her confessions, she did not develop relationships with teachers. In the mid-1990s, she joined the Uzhgorod group "B&B", where she performed as a backing vocalist.

== Career ==
=== 2001-2005: Early career and album "City of Deception" ===
In 2001, the B&B group performed at the Rap Music'01 international festival, where Yolka was noticed by Vlad Valov, the leader of the Bad Balance group, who later became the singer's first producer. After the group broke up, Youlka did not appear on stage for some time. At this time, she gave up her dream of becoming an artist and got a job as a waitress in a cafe. Three years later, Yolka received a call from Valov's company, and she moved to Moscow. Vladislav Valov signed a contract with Yolka, and one of the first songs recorded with him was “Words Spoken by You”, included in the collection “Girls Attack”.

In 2004, she performed in a concert on the day of memory of Mikhey with her group, which also included two guitarists and DJ Lenar. At the concert, Yolka sang Mikhey's song "Bitch Love". Continuing cooperation with Valov, the singer recorded a song of his composition "City of Deception".The composition was released on the radio in the summer of 2004 and became Yolka's first hit, hitting the hit parade of the Maximum radio station and staying there for twelve weeks.

On 9 November 2005, the debut album of the performer was released, entitled "City of Deception". Work on the disc, released on the 100PRO label, was completed in mid-2005, and, as the performer said, the record was written: "in one breath". Yolka presented music in a different style, which was attributed to both rock (due to guitar parts) and hip-hop (due to “broken” rhythms and scratches). The singer described her style as "guitar-heavy R&B". NewsMusic.ru wrote that "in Russia, such a mix is being done for the first time". The album was met with mixed reviews. Rita Skeeter of InterMedia spoke positively about the work, saying: "Yolka and Valov found a way to make this genre [R&B] truly competitive even in our market with its national characteristics". Andrei Nikitkin wrote in Rap.ru that Yolka is still a pop project, but “very high quality. Incorporating elements of both R'n'B and rock, reggae, chanson, and pop. And designed not so much for fans of one of these styles, but for a wide audience. Boris Barabanov in the Kommersant newspaper also spoke of the singer as the main hope of Russian pop music.

In 2005, Yolka became a nominee for the MTV channel's RMA award, in the Best Rap nomination. Several more singles were also released from the album, including the successful songs "Girl in Peugeot" and "Good mood", the latter of which reached position 56 on the Russian radio chart.

== Personal life ==
Following the 2022 Russian invasion of Ukraine, Yolka remained silent and maintained her residence in Russia. In 2025, she altered the lyrics to her 2010 song "Provans" to remove the mention of Boryspil International Airport, earning criticism in Ukraine. In January 2026, she announced that she was married. The same month, Russian and Ukrainian media reported that she had renounced her Ukrainian citizenship and taken the Russian one. Her representatives declined to comment on the matter.

== Filmography ==
- 2005 – Hoodwinked! – Red Riding Hood (Anne Hathaway) dubbing
- 2012 – Gentlemen of Fortune! – cameo, star at corporate
- 2012 – Scramble (film)
- 2013 – SashaTanya – cameo (5 series)
- 2013 – That's love

== Discography ==
=== Albums ===
- City of deception (2005)
- Shadows (2006)
- This magnificent world (2008)
- Point Apart (2011)
- Live concert (2013)
- #Neby (2015)
- Yavь (as YAVЬ) (2019)
- Past Perfect (2020)
- No offense (2021)

=== Songs ===
- "City of deception" (2005)
- "Girl in the Peugeot" (2005)
- "Good mood" (2005)
- "I Want to Be a Movie Star" ( 2005)
- "Two Roses" (2006)
- "Girl – student" (2006)
- "Terror" (2006)
- "Flood" (2006)
- "Mountains" (2006)
- "Handsome Boy" (2007)
- "Point – City" (2007)
- "Do not lose heart" (2008)
- "Good Morning" (2008)
- "Your Words" (2009)
- "Dreams" (2009)
- "Provence" (2010)
- "The large balloon" (2011)
- "Boy" (with Paul Will) (2011)
- "About You" (2011)
- "Chain Feeds" (2012)
- "I want" (2012)
- "Star Star" (with the band Megalopolis) (2012)
- "Body Ofigel" (2013)
- "The New World" (with the heat) (2013)
- "Fly, Liza" (2013)
- "We do not understand" (with Noize MC) (2013)
- "Do you know" (with Burito) (2014)
- "DJ Groove feat. Ёлка - Отпусти (Let it go)" (2016)
- "World opens" (2017)

=== Charts ===
Year	Title	Charts									Album
Year	Title	СНГ (Tophit Общий Топ-100)	Россия (Tophit Московский Топ-100)	Россия (Tophit Волгоградский Топ-100)	Россия (Tophit Санкт-Петербургский Топ-100)	Украина (Tophit Украинский Топ-100)	Украина (Tophit Киевский Топ-100)	Audience Choice TopHit 100	Латвия	СНГ (Tophit Годовой общий)	Album
2005	"Рассвет"	253	–	–	–	–	–	–	–	–	Тени
2005	"Девочка в Пежо"	132	147	–	–	–	–	–	–	–	Город обмана
2005	"Город обмана"	231	–	–	–	–	–	–	–	–	Город обмана
2005	"Хорошое настроение"	56	57	–	–	–	–	131	–	189	Город обмана
2005	"I Want To Be A Movie Star"	176	110	–	–	–	–	243	–	–	Город обмана
2006	"Две розы"	133	–	–	–	–	–	56	–	–	Город обмана
2006	"Девочка-студентка"	17	48	32	–	–	–	27	–	66	Тени
2006	"Террор"	240	145	–	–	–	–	227	–	–	Тени
2006	"Наводнение"	99	104	–	–	–	–	142	–	–	Тени
2006	"Горы"	40	92	19	–	–	–	85	–	–	Этот великолепный мир
2007	"Мальчик-красавчик"	51	105	41	–	–	–	26	–	–	Этот великолепный мир
2007	"Точки-города"	94	–	–	–	–	–	34	–	–	Этот великолепный мир
2008	"Не падай духом"	58	102	41	–	–	–	35	–	–	Этот великолепный мир
2009	"Твои слова"	154	–	–	–	–	–	56	–	–	—
2009	"Сны"	151	–	–	–	–	–	33	–	–	—
2010	"Прованс"	1	1	4	1	1	1	1	–	1	Точки расставлены
2011	"На большом воздушном шаре"	1	5	7	4	3	3	1	–	8	Точки расставлены
2011	"Мальчик"	109	–	–	–	–	–	13	–	–	Точки расставлены
2011	"Около тебя"	1	3	12	1	1	1	1	–	1	Точки расставлены
2012	"Цепи-ленты"	23	28	14	33	65	26	5	–	54	Точки расставлены
2012	"Хочу"	8	26	19	16	2	2	5	–	109	TBA
2012	"Звёзды, звёзды"	143	–	–	–	–	–	77	–	–	TBA
2013	"Тело офигело"	94	–	–	–	–	–	7	–	–	TBA
2013	"Новый мир"	163	–	–	–	–	–	35	–	–	TBA
2013	"Лети, Лиза"	36	63	47	69	–	94	14	–	–	TBA

"—" – missing song in the chart
