= Danko (singer) =

Russian singer (born 1969)

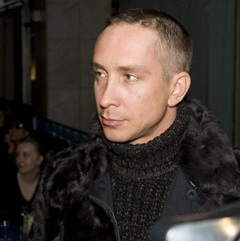

Background information
- Born: Alexander Valerievich Fadeyev; March 20, 1969 (age 57); Moscow, USSR
- Genre: Pop
- Occupations: Singer, Actor
- Years active: 1995–present
- Website: Official website

Alexander Valerievich Fadeyev (born March 20, 1969), better known by his stage name Danko, is a Russian singer, composer, songwriter, actor, businessman. Danko is the pseudonym of the singer, coined by producer Leonid Gutkin.

== Biography ==
Alexander Valerievich Fadeyev was born on March 20, 1969, in Moscow. His mother Elena Ilinskaya is a vocal teacher, father Valery Fadeyev, a physicist.

At the age of five he performed as a soloist in the choir of the Loktev Pioneers Palace. In ten years he entered the Choreography School at the Bolshoi Theatre. In 1995, at the Serge Lifar competition in San Francisco (USA), he received the Silver Award for the number staged by choreographer Sergei Bobrov. After graduation, in 1988, he was invited to the troupe of the Bolshoi Theater, where during the work he attended master classes from Asaf Messerer, Galina Ulanova, Marina Semyonova, Boris Akimov.

In the 1990s and 2000s he participated in the main repertoire performances of the Bolshoi Theater: Spartacus, Swan Lake, The Nutcracker, The Legend of Love, The Stone Flower, The Bayadere, Giselle, The Golden Age, Prince Igor, and many others.

Between 2000 and 2005 he attended the correspondence course at the Russian Academy of Theatre Arts in the Producer Faculty. He graduated as manager-producer of the Theater and Concert Business.

== Musical career ==
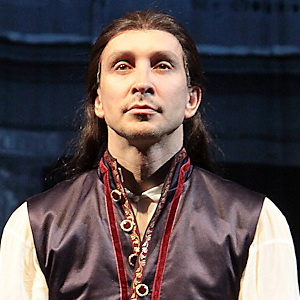
Alexander Fadeev as Vicomte de Valmont in the play "Valmont. Dangerous Liaisons"

Alexander Fadeev's singing career began as a soloist of the Bolshoi Theater. In the same period, he began to try himself as a composer, writing songs for poems of the Silver Age poets. His stepfather, a well-known bard Alexander Sukhanov, was a major influence. Fadeev repeatedly appeared at the concerts of Sukhanov.

In the late 1990s, on one of these author's evenings Alexander Fadeyev was noticed by producer and musician Leonid Gutkin, who invented the stage name Danko for him.

It was decided to work on the album with the prospect of not only a Russian but also an international release. To work on the project, Joakim Björklund from the TOEC production team was invited, who became co-producer of Leonid Gutkin. The group Premyer-Ministr, Masha Katz, Igor Butman, Pate (vocalist of the IFK group) were involved in work in Moscow. In the process of work, the idea arose to record a single with the soloist of the popular Swedish band Army of Lovers, known as La Camilla. The song "Russians are Coming" aired on European radio stations. As a result of their joint work, the album "Danko 2000" was released.

The first two singles "Moskovskaya noch" and "Delai raz, delai dva" increased Danko's popularity, and the song "Malysh", became a radio hit. Then a joint track with the Premyer-Ministr band was recorded.

In 2002, after the end of the contract, Danko parted with producer Leonid Gutkin, after which a long pause followed, only at the end of 2003 a music video for the song "Pust" was released.

In 2004, Danko released the album "Kogda muzhchina vlyublon", where he appeared as the author of texts and music of the majority of songs. The main hit of the album was the song "Ona".

At the end of 2010, the singer released "Album No. 5".

In 2013, the album "Tochka nevozvrata" was released, which, according to the singer, was much more experimental than his previous work. For the song "Bereg Ray", two clips were released (original and remix).

== Theatre ==
Alexander Fadeev accepted the offer of Yevgeny Slavutin, director of the Moscow State University "MOST" theater, to play a role in his performance, as a dramatic actor. "MOST" is the official place of work of the singer and actor Danko. "Airport", "I will get acquainted with her" (Don Juan) are some of the theater performances in which he plays the main roles.

== Personal life ==
He was married to Tatyana Vorobyova for three years.

He is currently married to model Natalia Ustyumenko. In early January 2004, they had a daughter, Sofia, and on April 19, 2014, a second daughter was born, who was named Agata. The girl was diagnosed with cerebral palsy.

September 29, 2011, took part as a groom in the program Let's Get Married.

== Discography ==
=== Albums ===
- 2000 — Danko
- 2001 — Moi talisman
- 2001 — Don Juan DE LuX
- 2004 — Kogda muzhchina vlyublon
- 2010 — Album № 5
- 2013 — Tochka nevozvrata
- 2013 — Singles (EP)

=== Singles ===
- 1999 — Russians Are Coming (maxi-single)

=== Compilations ===
- 2009 — The Best
- 2014 — The Best, Part 1,2,3

== Music videos ==
- 1999 — Moskovskaya noch
- 2000 — Malysh
- 2000 — Delay raz, delay dva
- 2000 — Pervyy sneg dekabrya
- 2001 — Tri spasibo
- 2001 — Ty menya razlyubila (Ya khochu byt s toboy)
- 2003 — Pust
- 2004 — Ona
- 2004 — Plachet osen
- 2006 — Oblaka
- 2009 — Lomanaya liniya
- 2013 — Bereg ray
- 2013 — Bereg ray remix
