= Andrey Gubin =

Russian singer (born 1974)

Andrey Gubin Андрей Губин
- Born: Andrey Valerevich Klementyev; 30 April 1974 (age 52); Ufa, Bashkir ASSR, RSFSR, Soviet Union
- Occupations: Singer; composer
- Years active: 1994–2005
- Height: 1.67 m (5 ft 6 in)
- Musical career
- Genres: Pop
- Instrument: Vocals

Andrey Viktorovich Gubin (Russian: Андрей Викторович Губин; born 30 April 1974), born Andrey Valerevich Klementyev (Russian: Андрей Валерьевич Клементьев) is a Russian pop-singer, poet, composer, hitmaker and record producer. Honored Artists of the Russian Federation (2004).

== Early years ==
Gubin was born on 30 April 1974 in Ufa. His family moved to Moscow in 1983, where they wandered about because of constant lack of money.

== Musical career ==
Gubin's first album I Am A Hobo (Russian: Я — бомж), released when he was 15, sold 200 copies. Gubin's second and third album Ave Maria and Prince and Princess (Russian: Принц и принцесса) respectively were the start of his career. His first performance on stage with his first hit Nomad Boy (Russian: Мальчик-бродяга) was in 1994.

In the late 2000s, Gubin stopped performing due to serious physical health problems. According to the singer, in the mid-2000s, he was diagnosed with left-sided trigeminal neuralgia of the face, a disease of the nervous system that causes constant facial pain. Gubin also disclosed that he was experiencing heart issues.

In 2024, media sources erroneously concluded that Gubin officially announced his retirement from singing while Gubin has clearly stated his intentions to gradually complete and record multiple new songs he has written over the years, as long as his physical health sufficiently improves.

According to an official fan-page post, Gubin's first ever vinyl record was issued in November 2024 with a rerelease of his fourth album (the first studio-recorded album), Nomad Boy (Russian: "Мальчик-бродяга"). Three hundred copies are available for sale.

== Discography ==
| Russian name | Translation | Year |
|---|---|---|
| Мальчик-бродяга | Nomad Boy | 1995 |
| Только ты | Only You | 1998 |
| Было, но прошло | It Was, But No Longer | 2000 |
| Всегда с тобой | Always With You | 2002 |
| Танцы | Dancing | 2002 |
| Время романтиков | Romantics' Time | 2004 |
