= MakSim =

Russian singer (born 1983)

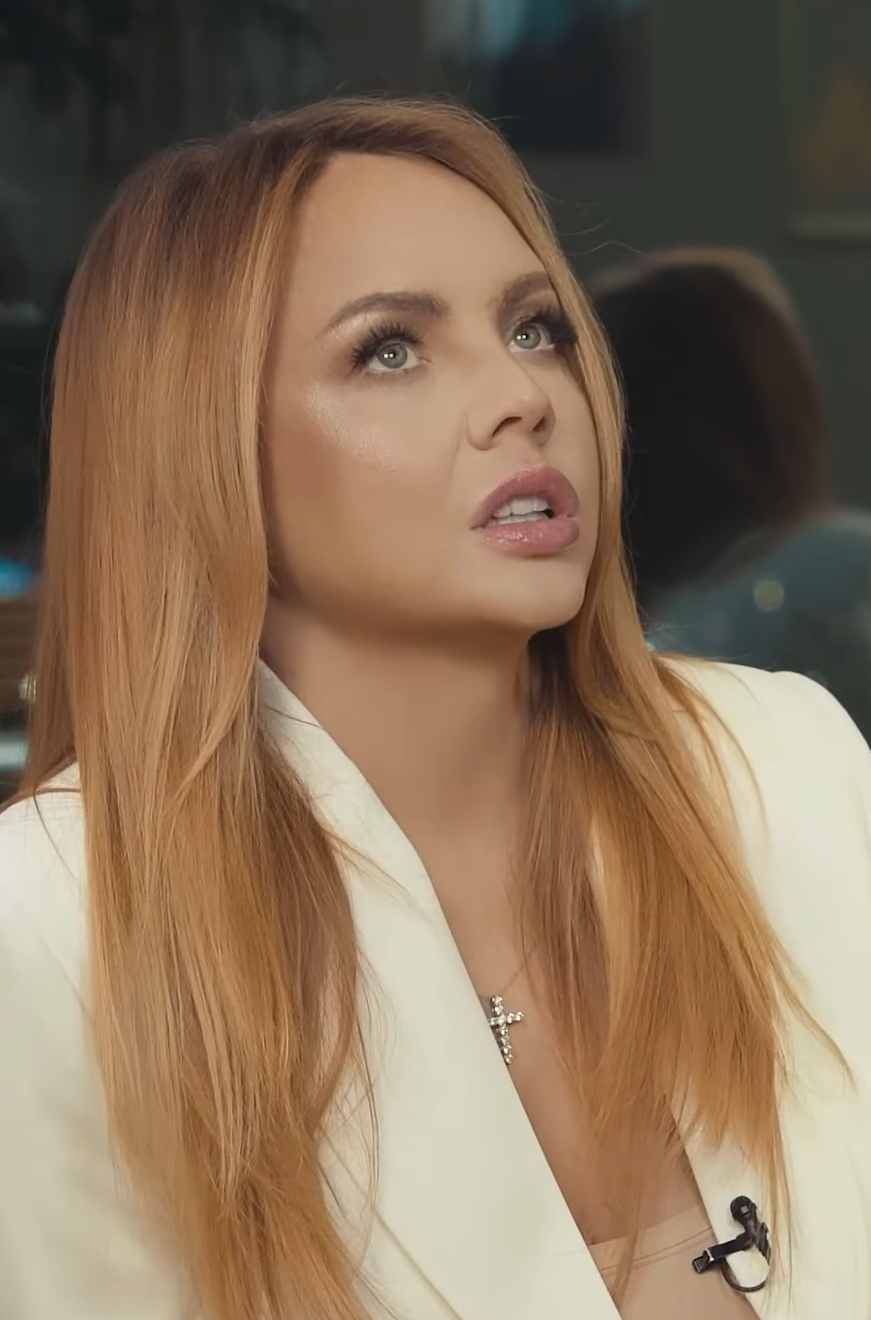
- MakSim in 2024

Background information
- Also known as: Maxi-M
- Born: Marina Sergeevna Abrosimova; 10 June 1983 (age 43); Kazan, Russian SFSR, Soviet Union
- Genres: Pop; pop rock; electropop; Europop; soft rock; blues; folk pop
- Occupations: singer, songwriter, music producer
- Years active: 2005–present
- Label: Warner Music Russia

Marina Sergeyevna Abrosimova (Russian: Марина Сергеевна Абросимова; born 10 June 1983), better known under her stage name MakSim (Russian: МакSим; earlier – Maxi-M) is a Russian singer, songwriter, and music producer.

MakSim rose to fame in the Russian-speaking world in the mid-2000s after releasing her debut album Trudnyi vozrast in 2006. She went on to release a string of successful singles afterwards, including "Moy ray", "Znayesh li ty" and "Vetrom stat'", which all topped the TopHit radio charts. Between 2007 and 2010, she enjoyed the peak of her career. In 2007 and 2008, MakSim won the award for Best Female Russian Singer at the MTV Russia Music Awards and in 2008 and 2009 won the same prize at the Muz-TV Music Awards, also winning the prize for Best Album in 2008 for Moy ray.

== Early life ==
Maksimova was born in Kazan in 1983 in a family of automechanic Sergey Abrosimov and kindergarten teacher Svetlana Maksimova. In her childhood, she was said to have been inseparable from her older brother Maksim, therefore taking his name as her nickname. From a young age, she was involved in music and studied vocals and piano at a local music school. In her childhood, Maksimova also enjoyed karate, reaching up to a red belt. Afterwards, Maksimova studied at the Kazan National Research Technical University named after A.N. Tupolev, where she graduated with a degree from the Faculty of Humanities.

== Career ==
=== 1998–2004: Early career ===
At the age of 15, Maksimova decided that she wanted to dedicate her life to music. She had participated in several music competitions in her schools prior, but then decided to become the lead singer of the Kazan group Pro-Z. With Pro-Z, she performed at several local events, enjoying local popularity. However, nationwide fame stayed out.

In 2003, Maksimova recorded her first independent song "Trudnyi vozrast" with the members of Pro-Z, which did not receive much radio attention. However, her follow-up single "Santimetry dykhaniya" peaked at number 34 on the TopHit general radio charts, which combined all radio charts in Eastern Europe.

After this, Maksimova moved to Moscow to create a larger chance for her music to be heard. However, upon arriving in Moscow, she did not have a place to live. For eight days, she slept in a train station before she met her future roommate, with whom she rented a one-room apartment for the course of six years.

=== 2005–2010: Breakthrough and peak of fame ===
In 2005, Maksimova signed a deal with Gala Records and re-released her song "Trudnyi vozrast", then breaking through in the Russian music industry, subsequently releasing an eponymous album a year later. In that time, MakSim also shot her first music videos for the songs "Trudnyi vozrast" and "Nezhnost'". Following the release of her album, MakSim embarked on her first nationwide tour.

With the single "Otpuskayu" in late 2006, MakSim was catapulted in nationwide fame, scoring her first number-one single in Russia. Her follow-up record "Znayesh' li ty" also topped the TopHit charts. As a result of her sudden commercial acclaim, her label motivated her to record a second album. MakSim's sophomore album Moy ray was subsequently released in November 2007.

In 2007, MakSim was first nominated for the MTV Russian Music Awards. At the ceremony, she was received awards in for both nominations she received: Best Female Singer and Best Pop Project. At the Muz-TV Awards, MakSim won the nomination Discovery of the Year and Best Ringtone for her song "Nezhnost'". A year later, she again received nominations for Best Female Singer at the Russian Music Awards and won the award of Best Female Singer at the Muz-TV Awards as well as winning awards for Best Song with "Moy ray" and Best Album for the eponymous album.

On 22 March 2008, MakSim became one of the few Russian pop artists to have performed at the Olympic Stadium in Moscow with a solo concert. At the end of 2008, it was named the fourth best-selling concert in Russia that year, selling more than 12,000 tickets.

In late 2008, it became known that MakSim was pregnant with her first child. Despite this, she continued with her touring activities. In August 2008, she released the single "Luchshaya noch'", which topped the TopHit general radio charts. The follow-up, "Ne otdam", also topped the charts and became her most-rotated song on Russian radio.

In June 2009, MakSim received the award for Best Female Singer for the second time at the Muz-TV Awards. In December of that year, she released her third album Odinochka.

=== 2010–present: Honours and continued artistry ===
In 2010, MakSim released her next single "Dozhd'", which became her first focus single to not top the TopHit general charts in several years. After that, her popularity started to further decline as her output dramatically decreased.

After several changes in her private life, MakSim released her fourth studio album Drugaya real'nost' in mid 2013. After this album, MakSim parted ways with her label Gala Records. In 2015, MakSim released her fifth album Khorosho.

In late 2016, MakSim got recognised with the title Honoured Artist of Tatarstan, her home region in Russia. In 2018, she released her sixth album Poligamnost'. After that, she stopped producing music for a while as she was recuperating after a car crash in 2019. In late 2020, she returned to the stage with the song "Zabyvay".

In June 2021 during a concert in her home city Kazan, the singer fell ill with symptoms of COVID-19, however a PCR-based test gave a negative result on three different occasions. MakSim was then transported to hospital as symptoms worsened. Her condition quickly deteriorated there and she was moved to an intensive care unit, where she was held in an artificial coma, from 19 June until 3 August. On 9 August, MakSim returned to Instagram and shared that she had been moved to an ordinary unit.

== Personal life ==
In 2008, Maksimova married her sound producer, but divorced him three years later. From this marriage, she had a daughter, who was born in 2009. From 2012 until 2014, Maksimova was in a relationship with Animal Jazz frontman Alexander Krasovitski. In 2014, she gave birth to a second daughter.

== Discography ==
=== Albums ===
- Trudnyi vozrast(2006)
- Moy ray (2007)
- Odinochka (2009)
- Drugaya real'nost' (2013)
- Khorosho (2015)
- Poligamnost' (2018)

=== Singles ===
Year	Title	Golden Gramophone	Charts						
Year	Title	Golden Gramophone	General Airplay	Russia Airplay	Ukraine Airplay	Latvian Airplay Top-50	Audience Choice Chart	Итоговый годовой	Europe Billboard Top 100
2005	"Трудный возраст" (2005 version)	–	46	–	–	–	–	161	–
2005	"Нежность" (album edit)	1	178	–	–	–	116	–	–
2006	"Отпускаю"	3	1	–	–	–	1	72	–
2007	"Знаешь ли ты"	1	1	–	–	–	2	20	43
2007	"Ветром стать"	1	1	–	–	9	3	15	–
2007	"Мой рай"	1	1	–	–	16	1	54	56
2008	"Научусь летать"	1	1	–	–	27	4	3	55
2008	"Лучшая ночь"	1	1	–	–	–	5	58	46
2009	"Не отдам"	1	1	–	–	5	3	12	58
2009	"На радиоволнах"	1	3	–	–	46	1	37	54
2010	"Весна"	–	65	–	96	30	4	138	–
2010	"Дождь"	2	2	4	22	–	3	61	–
2011	"Как летать?"	1	16	13	30	–	7	37	–
2011	"Осколки"	–	16	17	28	–	10	162	–
2012	"Живи" (feat. Animal ДжаZ)	–	–	–	–	–	160	–	–
2012	"Это же я"	–	170	–	–	–	54	–	–
2012	"Колыбельная"	–	171	–	–	–	48	–	–
2013	"Небо-самолёты"	–	–	–	–	–	42	–	–
2013	"Я ветер"	–	87	–	73	–	51	182	–
2013	"Другая реальность"	–	32	31	52	–	16	195	–
2013	"Я буду жить"	–	192	–	–	–	107	–	–
2014	"God"	–	179	–	–	–	25	–	–
