= Diskoteka Avariya =

Russian band

Дискотека “Авария” Diskoteka “Avariya”
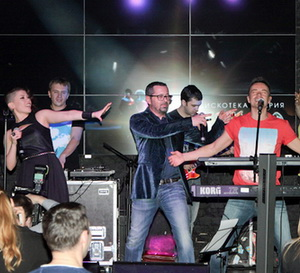
- In 2013

Background information
- Origin: Ivanovo, Russia
- Genres: Pop rap, house, hip-hop, nu-disco, dance-pop, pop rock
- Years active: 1990—present
- Labels: ARS Records, Corporation Avariya
- Members: Aleksey Ryzhov; Aleksey Serov
- Past members: Oleg Zhukov; Nikolay Timofeev; Anna Khokhlova
- Website: http://www.avariya.ru

Diskoteka "Avariya" (Russian: Дискотека "Авария" - Disco "Accident") are a Russian band from Ivanovo, Russia. The duo consists of Aleksey Borisovich Serov (Алексей Борисович Серов) and Aleksey Olegovich Ryzhov (Алексей Олегович Рыжов). Its former members include vocalist Anna Khokhlova (Анна Хохлова), who left in September 2020, vocalist Nikolay Stagoranovich Timofeev (Николай Стагоранович Тимофеев), who left in July 2012, and rapper Oleg Yevgenyevich Zhukov (Олег Евгеньевич Жуков), who died on February 9, 2002, of cancer.

Although "Avariya" knew only moderate success in Russia during the 1990s, they are considered to be pioneers of house music in that country. Following Zhukov's death in 2002, the trio slowly lost original popularity and oriented themselves into a mainstream electropop movement.

== History ==
=== Origins ===
Towards the end of the 1980s, Nikolay Timofeev and Alexey Ryzhov met in high school. Both being creative minds with good sense of humor, they started creating humorous material. After being noticed at a KVN (Клуб Весёлых и Находчивых, Klub Vesyolyh i Nahodchivyh, Club of Funny and Smart, is a Russian TV show, a humor contest, which indirectly spanned similar contests in schools, independent from the show), they started receiving invitations to provide entertainment at parties.

Meanwhile, the band was asked to perform in a local club called "Электрон" ("Electron"). Noticing the bad state of their club, they dubbed it "Disaster Disco". After a few fixing, the rating of their club went uphill as it became more and more famous.

=== From two to four ===
A childhood acquaintance of Timofeev and Ryzhov, Oleg Zhukov, was amongst the biggest and most loyal fans of "Disco 'Crash'", and soon joined the duo's closest circle of friends. One night, they took him with them to a soirée organized by a company called "Kranek", and all Zhukov did was repeating the company's name during one song. As Timofeev recalls: "And during one of our song, Zhukov repeated the company's name, Kranek, with such a voice, that the audience and us fell for his charm, and since then, he joined us for good". This happened in 1991. Around that time, the band was invited to Moscow for a trial studio record, resulting in their first album "Танцуй со мной" (Tantsuy so mnoy", Dance with me), but it wasn't what the band expected. Some of its songs were later reused in their first official album.

Towards 1997, the trio noticed their club was losing their popularity. They found out that a rival disco opened in town, and people there were charged half as much. They discovered that disco had only one MC, young and motivated, close in style to Timofeev. They decided that it was the best to join forces with him. That's how Alexey Serov joined the band. His first contribution to the band was recording a skit where he asked to turn the music off using many expletives (used later in the song "Заколебал Ты!" but with expletives covered by radio parasite sounds), and his second contribution was recording vocals for the second and final version of the song "Двигай-двигай" ("Dvigay-dvigay", Move it-move it).

=== First success ===
"At that time, our group was full—fledged: one was a handsome hairy man, the other was smart with glasses, played the piano, the third, a foolish athlete, jumped and ran, and Zhukov was the good that unites us all."

— Aleksey Serov, StarHit interview, 2020

In 1998, while Russia was in crisis, the band decided to record their second album (considered by many to be their first). They lacked the cash to pay for studio time, so they made a deal with the studio "Soyuz". At that time, the studio was working on a remix album for the Belarusian band Lyapis Trubetskoy called "Lyapis-Dance", and Diskoteka "Avariya" was asked to make four remixes for the album. They made three pure remixes, while the last one became a comic rap song using Lyapis Trubetskoy's chorus. The song, called "Ты кинула" ("Ty kinula", You dumped) became their first single and later, their first music video. The band then had enough money to record their first official album "Песня про тебя и меня" ("Pesnya pro tebya i menya", Song about you and me). Their single stint with a producer, Peter Volkov, was short-lived.

The song “New Year’s” brought national love to the group, which did not cause much excitement in the winter of 1999, but became very popular in the summer of 2000. The video "Новогодняя" has been broadcast on TV every year for the holiday it celebrates, Novy God -New Year's Day.

After their album "Маньяки" ("Manyaki", Maniacs) was released in 2001, Oleg Zhukov fell ill, and the band had to perform without him. On 9 February 2002, Zhukov died of brain cancer. "Disco Superstar" music video, which was originally prepared for the artist's return, turned out to be a dedication.

=== As a trio ===
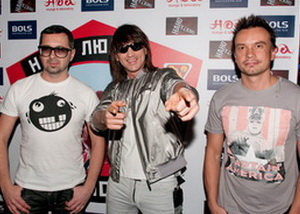
Presentation of "Nano-Techno" music video, 2011.

After Zhukov's death and a period of pause, the band decided to go on as a trio. They released their first music videos without Zhukov: "Х.Х.Х.И.Р.Н.Р." (acronym for "Hip-Hop, House and Rock'N'Roll") and "Небо" ("Nebo", Sky), the latter featuring international model Katia Elizarova.

After releases of some famous singles, the band released in 2006 a new album called "Четверо парней" ("Chetvero Parney", Four guys), which was praised by critics. It featured the song of the same name (although listed in the song list as an acronym of its title) which was recorded prior to the release of "Маньяки", but the band lacked time to put it in the album. This song was the last new song released to feature Oleg Zhukov's vocals.

=== Changes in style and lineup ===
In 2011, the band released a new album "Недетское время" ("Nedetskoe vremya", A Time not for Kids), featuring a more electropop-sounding style, and for the first time the autotune was used. The album itself was released online for free.

In July 2012, Timofeev left the band to start his own solo career. The main reason cited by both sides was a continuous strain in the relationship between Nikolay and the rest of the band. In November, the band announced on their website the arrival of a female vocalist, Anna Knokhlova.

== Members ==
- Aleksey Olegovich Ryzhov - songwriter, DJ, occasional singer, rapper (1990–present)
- Aleksey Borisovich Serov - rapper (1997–present)

Former members

- Oleg Yevgenyevich Zhukov - rapper (1991–2002; his death)
- Nikolay Stagoranovich Timofeev - singer (1990–2012)
- Anna Khokhlova - singer (2012–2020)

== Discography ==
=== Studio albums ===
- 1996: Танцуй со мной (Dance with Me)
- 1999: Марафон (Marathon)
- 2001: Маньяки (Maniacs)
- 2006: Четверо парней (Four Guys)
- 2011: Недетское время (Not a time for children)
- 2014: Девушка за рулём (Girl at the wheel)

=== Compilation albums ===
- 1999: Песня про тебя и меня (Song About You and Me)
- 2000: Все хиты: "Авария" против! (All Hits: "Avariya" Against)
- 2009: The Best
- 2010: Other
- 2023: THE BEST, PART 1

=== EPs ===
- 2001: Заколебал ты! (You've got me bugged!)
- 2002: Х.Х.Х.И.Р.Н.Р. (H.H.H.&.R.N.R - Hip-Hop House & Rock-n-Roll)
- 2003: Небо (The Sky)

=== Singles ===
- 1995: Малинки (Malinki) (the 1st version)
- 1998: Давай, Авария! (Come on, Avariya!)
- 1998: Ты кинула (You Dumped) (with Lyapis Trubetskoy)
- 1999: Пей пиво (Drink Beer)
- 1999: Новогодняя (New Year Song)
- 1999: Некуда деваться (Nowhere to go)
- 2000: Влечение (Appetence)
- 2001: Заколебал ты! (You've got me bugged!)
- 2001: На острие атаки (At the point of attack)
- 2001: Песна про яйца (Song about eggs)
- 2002: Disco Superstar
- 2002: Х.Х.Х.И.Р.Н.Р. (H.H.H.&.R.N.R)
- 2003: Небо (The Sky) (with Moral Code X)
- 2003: Небо ремикс (The Sky - remix)
- 2004: Суровый рэп (Severe Rap)
- 2004: Песенка разбойников (Thieves' Song)
- 2005: Если хочешь остаться (If you want to stay)
- 2006: Опа (Opa)
- 2006: Малинки (Malinki) (with Jeanna Friske) (the 2nd version)
- 2007: Зло (The Evil)
- 2007: Серенада (Serenade)
- 2008: Паша face-control (Pasha face-control) (with DJ Smash)
- 2008: Отцы (The Fathers)
- 2009: Отцы (The Fathers) - Dj Leonid Rudenko remix
- 2009: Планета Любовь (Planet Love)
- 2009: Модный танец Арам Зам Зам (Fashion Dance called Aram Zam Zam)
- 2010: Лето всегда (Summer Forever) (with Vera Brezhneva, Anastasia Zadorozhnaya and Svetlana Khodchenkova)
- 2010: ЧП (ChP)
- 2011: Нано-Техно (Nano-Techno)
- 2011: Недетское время (No children time)
- 2011: Прогноз погоды (Weather forecast) (with Christina Orbakaite)
- 2012: Карнавал (Carnival) (with Dzhigan and Vika Krutaya)
- 2012: Лабиринт (Labyrinth) (with Batishta)
- 2012: Вечер (The Evening)
- 2012: Музыка злектро (Electro music) (with E-not)
- 2013: Ноги-ноги (Legs and Legs)
- 2013: К.У.К.Л.А. (K.U.K.L.A, Doll)
- 2013: Качели (Swing)
- 2014: #ЛайкМи (#LikeMe)
- 2014: В тишине (In the silence)
- 2014: Девушка за рулём (Girl at the wheel)
- 2015: Самуи (Samui)
- 2016: Яркий Я (Bright Me) (with Philipp Kirkorov)
- 2017: Моя любовь (My Love)
- 2018: Мохер (Mohair) (with Khleb)
- 2018: Фантазёр (Fantazer) (with Nikolay Baskov)
- 2018: Welcome to Russia
- 2019: КОУЧ (COACH)
- 2020: Аве Авария (Ave Avariya)
- 2020: Алёна (Alyona)
- 2021: Улетела (Flew Away) (with Slava)
- 2024: Потерявший (Poteryavshiy)

=== Music videos ===
(directors in parentheses)

- 1999: 'Ты кинула' (Alexander Shmit)
- 1999: 'Некуда деваться' (Alexander Solokha)
- 1999: 'Давай, "Авария"!' (Mikhail Segal)
- 1999: 'Новогодняя' (No name/Hindrek Maasik)
- 2000: 'Пей пиво' (Alexey Repnikov)
- 2000: 'Влечение' (Hindrek Maasik)
- 2001: 'Заколебал ты!' (Hindrek Maasik)
- 2001: 'Яйца' (Hindrek Maasik)
- 2001: 'На острие атаки' (Hindrek Maasik)
- 2002: 'Disco Superstar' (Hindrek Maasik)
- 2002: 'Х.Х.Х.И.Р.Н.Р.' (Hindrek Maasik)
- 2003: 'Небо' (Mikeadelica)
- 2003: 'Небо' (remіх) (Hindrek Maasik)
- 2004: 'Песенка Разбойников' (Maxim Papernik and Diskoteka Avariya)
- 2004: 'Суровый рэп' (Arni Thor Jonsson)
- 2004: 'Суровый рэп' (remix) (Arni Thor Jonsson & 'Diskoteka Avariya')
- 2005: 'Если хочешь остаться' (Hindrek Maasik)
- 2006: 'Опа!' (Hindrek Maasik)
- 2006: 'Малинки-Малинки' (Hindrek Maasik/Vlad Opelyants) (совместно с Жанной Фриске)
- 2007: 'Зло' ('Diskoteka Avariya')
- 2007: 'Серенада' (Hindrek Maasik)
- 2008: 'Паша — face control' (Hindrek Maasik)
- 2008: 'Отцы' (Hindrek Maasik)
- 2009: 'Отцы — Dj Leonid Rudenko remix' (Hindrek Maasik)
- 2009: 'Планета Любовь' (Hindrek Maasik)
- 2009: 'Модный танец Арам зам зам' (Alexey Golubev)
- 2010: 'Новогодняя 2010 (DJ Рыжов ('Diskoteka Avariya') Remix)' (Hindrek Maasik)
- 2010: 'Лето Всегда!' (Sarik Anreasyan) (with Vera Brezhneva)
- 2010: 'ЧП (Четверо Парней)' (Hindrek Maasik)
- 2010: 'Звезда (Четверо Парней)' (Hindrek Maasik)
- 2011: 'Недетское время' (Hindrek Maasik)
- 2011: 'Нано-Техно' (Andrey Mudrov)
- 2011: 'Прогноз погоды' (Alexey Golubev, Egor Konchalovsky)
- 2012: 'Карнавал' (Hindrek Maasik)
- 2012: 'Лабиринт' (Evgeny Nikitin)
- 2012: 'Вечер' (Hindrek Maasik)
- 2012: 'Музыка Электро' (Hindrek Maasik)
- 2012: 'Недетское время' (Hindrek Maasik)
- 2012: 'Ноги-ноги' (Hindrek Maasik)
- 2013: 'К.У.К.Л.А.' (Hindrek Maasik)
- 2013: 'Качели' (Hindrek Maasik)
- 2014: 'Лайк ми' (Hindrek Maasik)

== Awards ==
- 2002: MTV Europe Music Awards - Best Russian Act
- 2002: Song of 2002 Festival - Group of the Year
- 2005: Russian Music Awards - Best Group
- 2009: ZD Awards 2008 - Best Dance Group of 2008
