= Russian National Music Award =

Music award, established in 2015 by the Academy of Russian Music

- Current: 5th Annual Russian National Music Awards
- Awarded for: Outstanding achievements in the Russian music industry
- Location: State Kremlin Palace in Moscow
- Country: Russia
- Presented by: The Academy of Russian Music
- Rewards: Diploma and award statuette "Prima"
- First award: December 10, 2015; 10 years ago
- Website: musicpremia.ru

Television/radio coverage
- Network: Russia-1

The Russian National Music Award (abbr. RNMA) (Russian: Российская национальная музыкальная премия; abbr. РНМП, romanized: Rossiyskaya natsional'naya muzykal'naya premiya. RNMP), also known as Russian Music Award, (abbr. RMA) (Russian: Российская музыкальная премия, romanized: Rossiyskaya muzykal'naya premiya. RMP; abbr. РМП) or Victoria Award (Russian: Виктория премия, romanized: Viktoriya premiya) is a music award, established in 2015 by the Academy of Russian Music, to recognise the talent and achievements in the Russian popular and classical music scene.

The nominees and winners are chosen by a jury consisting of members of the Academy of Russian Music. The Russian National Music Award is considered the Russian equivalent to the Grammy Award.

== History ==
The award was established in 2015 by the Academy of Russian Music and its president Yuri Kostin, (ru) following an initiative of Russian music industry grand Mikhail Gutseriev. The aim was to establish a professional, objective, impartial award to recognise achievements in the Russian music scene. According to its organisers, their goal is to be "the most objective music award in Russia".

"Russia is a country with a rich musical heritage [...] We deserve an institution of impartial, high-quality and honest assessment of the work of artists and authors of popular music. That is why the Russian National Music Award “Victoria” was created." — Yuri Kostin, President of the Academy of Russian Music

The award ceremony is held annually in December, in Moscow, and broadcast on Russia-1.

Award ceremonies have been held on

- 10 December 2015 (Live broadcast on Russia-1 on 11 December 2015)
- 7 December 2016 (broadcast on Russia-1 on 9 December 2016)
- 13 December 2017 (broadcast on Russia-1 on 15 December 2017)
- 7 December 2018 (broadcast on Russia-1 on 7 December 2018)
- 5 December 2019 (broadcast on Russia-1 on 13 December 2019)

The first award ceremony, in 2015, took place in the Crocus City Hall, since then, the ceremony has been held in the State Kremlin Palace.

The ceremonies have been accompanied by live performances of renowned Russian, such as Polina Gagarina, Philipp Kirkorov, Nikolay Baskov, Dima Bilan, Sergey Lazarev, and Leonid Agutin, international artists, including Christina Aguilera, and Russian-speaking artists like Alekseev, Svetlana Loboda, Ani Lorak and Dimash Kudaibergen.

The award ceremonies were hosted by Vera Brezhneva and Aleksandr Revva in 2015, Igor Vernik and Olga Shelest(ru) in 2016, Glukoza and Andrey Razygraev in 2017, and by Andrey Malakhov in 2018 and 2019.

== Voting procedure ==
The winners of the RNMAs are chosen by an expert jury, namely by the more than 150 members of the Academy of Russian Music, called "Academicians".

In the first round of the evaluation process, nominees are suggested by production centers, record labels and other professionals of the Russian music scene; but artists also have the possibility to apply themselves. Approximately a month before the award ceremony, the suggested nominees are announced at the Russian National Music Award Gala Dinner. With the gala dinner, the expert voting of the Academicians is officially launched. Then, in an anonymous online voting, each Academy member can cast one vote in each category. At the end of November the voting traditionally closes, and in early December the top nominees who received the most Academician votes within each category are presented as "finalists" to the media. Then, the winners of the expert voting are revealed at the Russian National Music Award Ceremony.

The voting process is controlled by the British international audit and consulting company Ernst & Young that keeps the voting results a secret, even to the Academy and the event organisers themselves, until the winners are announced at the award ceremony.

The winners receive a diploma and a gold statuette called "Prima".

== Categories ==
The National Russian Music Award has been presented in the following (occasionally changing) categories:

- Best Male Singer in Popular Music
- Best Female Singer in Popular Music
- Best Vocalist in Classical Music
- Best Instrumentalist in Classical Music
- Composer of the Year
- Lyricist of the Year
- Song of the Year
- Music Video of the Year
- Newcomer of the Year in Popular Music
- Best Pop Group
- Best Folk Artist/Band
- Best Rock Artist/Band
- Best Electronic Project
- Best Hip Hop Project
- Urban Romance
- Best Soundtrack
- Dance Hit of the Year
- Best Concert
- Best Music TV Show
- Best Music Producer

== Main category winners and finalists ==
Year	Best Male Singer in Popular Music	Best Female Singer in Popular Music	Best Vocalist in Classical Music	Best Instrumentalist in Classical Music	Composer of the Year
2015	Dima Bilan	Ani Lorak	Aida Garifullina	-	-
2015	Grigory Leps	Nyusha	Dmitri Hvorostovsky	-	-
2015	Sergey Lazarev	Polina Gagarina	Evgeny Kungurov(ru)	-	-
2015	Valery Meladze	Valeriya	Hibla Gerzmava	-	-
2015	-	Yolka	Ildar Abdrazakov	-	-
2015	-	-	Lyubov Kazarnosvskaya	-	-
2015	-	-	Maria Guleghina	-	-
2015	-	-	Vasily Gerello	-	-
2015	-	-	Vasily Ladyuk(ru)	-	-
2016	Alekseev	Nyusha	Anna Netrebko	Denis Matsuev (piano)	Bianka
2016	Dima Bilan	Polina Gagarina	Dmitri Hvorostovsky	Viki Lee (piano)	Igor Matvienko
2016	Grigory Leps	Svetlana Loboda	Hibla Gerzmava	Viktor Tretyakov (violin)	Konstantin Meladze
2016	Sergey Lazarev	Valeriya	Igor Morozov	Yuri Bashmet (violin)	Viktor Drobysh
2016	Valery Meladze	Yolka	Vasily Ladyuk(ru)	-	-
2016	-	Yulianna Karaulova	-	-	-
2017	Alekseev	Barbara Vizbor(ru)	Aleksey Tatarintsev	Borislav Strulev(ru) with Igor Krutoy (cello, piano)	Diana Arbenina
2017	Dima Bilan	Elena Temnikova	Anna Netrebko	Denis Matsuev (piano)	Igor Krutoy
2017	Leonid Agutin	Lolita	Hibla Gerzmava	Nikolai Lugansky (piano)	Igor Matvienko
2017	Sergey Lazarev	Svetlana Loboda	Khachatur Badalyan	Pavel Artemyev-Druchinin (piano)	Konstantin Meladze
2017	Philipp Kirkorov	Yolka	Veronika Dzhioeva	Vadim Repin (violin)	Viktoria Kokhana
2018	Aleksandr Panayotov	Alena Sviridova(ru)	Aida Garifullina	Borislav Strulev(ru) (cello)	Alena Sviridova(ru)
2018	Denis Klyaver(ru)	Elena Temnikova	Anna Netrebko	Catherine Mechetina (piano)	Anton Pustovoy
2018	Philipp Kirkorov	Kristina Orbakaitė	Dimash Kudaibergen	Denis Matsuev (piano)	Igor Krutoy
2018	Sergey Lazarev	Polina Gagarina	Hibla Gerzmava	Ivan Bessonov (piano)	Leonid Agutin
2018	Vladimir Presnyakov Jr.	Svetlana Loboda	Nikolai Baskov	Yuri Bashmet (violin)	Victor Zinchuk
2018	-	Taisia Povaliyi	-	-	Victoria Kokhana
2018	-	Yolka	-	-	-
2019	Dima Bilan	Lolita	Aida Garifullina	Daniil Trifonov (piano)	Denis Kovalsky
2019	Max Barskih	Maruv	Anna Netrebko	Denis Matsuev (piano)	Igor Krutoy
2019	Monatik	Polina Gagarina	Dimash Kudaibergen	Ivan Bessonov (piano)	Konstantin Meladze
2019	Nikolai Baskov	Svetlana Loboda	Hibla Gerzmava	Kirill Richter(ru) (piano)	Monatik Chilibi
2019	Philip Kirkorov	Zivert	Ildar Abdrazakov	Nikolai Lugansky (piano)	Victoria Kokhana
2019	Sergey Lazarev	-	Olga Peretyatko	Victor Zinchuk (guitar)	-
2019	Valery Meladze	-	-	-	-

== Special prize winners ==
2015	2016	2017	2018	2019
Special prize for a unique contribution to the formation of Russian pop music: Valery Leontiev	Special Prize for Discovery of the Year in Classical Music: Rostislav Mudritsky	Special Prize for Legend of the National Stage: Lev Leshchenko	Special Prize for contribution to the development of the music industry: Leonid Agutin	Special Prize for contribution to the development of popular music in Russia: Valery Leontiev
Special Prize for Exceptional Instrumental Performing Skills: Denis Matsuev		Special Prize for an invaluable contribution to the Russian musical culture: Eduard Artemiev	Memorial award: Joseph Kobzon	Special Prize for Discovery of the Year: Dimash Kudaibergen
		Special Prize for contribution to the development of the popular music industry: Philipp Kirkorov		Special Prize for Discovery of the Year: Zivert

== Award statistics ==
Number of awards	Number of nominations as finalist	Artist
7	13	Philipp Kirkorov
6	12	Basta
6	9	Sergey Shnurov/Leningrad
5	5	Denis Matsuev
4	11	Leonid Agutin
4	7	Svetlana Loboda
3	9	Dima Bilan
3	4	Anna Netrebko
3	4	Mikhail Gutseriev
3	4	Zivert
2	9	Konstantin Meladze
2	9	Sergey Lazarev
2	9	Yolka
2	8	Polina Gagarina
2	7	Bi-2
2	4	A-Studio
2	4	Dimash Kudaibergen
2	3	Denis Klyaver
2	3	MBand
2	2	Valery Leontiev
1	9	IOWA
1	5	Igor Krutoy
1	4	Arthur Pirozhkov
1	3	Aida Garifullina
1	3	Alekseev
1	3	Channel One Russia
1	3	Grigory Leps
1	3	Igor Matvienko
1	3	Mashina Vremeni
1	3	Oleg Mityaev
1	3	Stas Mikhailov
1	3	Valeriya
1	2	Dmitri Hvorostovsky
1	2	Estradarada(ru)
1	2	Monatik
1	2	Mushrooms(ru)
1	2	Semyon Slepakov
1	2	Serebro
1	2	Tamara Gverdtsiteli
1	2	Pelageya
1	1	Alien24
1	1	Andrej Cherny
1	1	Eduard Artemyev
1	1	Joseph Kobzom
1	1	Lev Leshchenko
1	1	Rostislav Mudritsky
1	1	#2Masha
-	8	Valery Meladze
-	5	Burito, Hibla Gerzmeva, Nikolay Baskov, Time and Glass
-	4	Ani Lorak, Diana Arbenina, Egor Creed, Max Barskih, Nargiz, New Wave Festival, Nochnye Snaipery
-	3	Alyona Sviridova, Elena Temnikova, Lolita, Mot(ru), Victoria Kokhana, Vladimir Presnyakov Jr., Yuri Bashmet
-	2	Borislav Strulev(ru), Brandon Stone, DDT, Degrees(ru), Denis Kovalsky, Face, Ildar Abdrazakov, Ivan Bessonov, Julianna Karaulova, Lilia Vinogradova(ru), Lyubov Uspenskaya, Maksim Fadeev, Mikhail Shufutinsky, Mummy Troll, Nikolai Lugansky, Nikolai Rastorguev, Ruki Vverh!, Nyusha, Splean, Taisia Povaliyi, Therr Maitz, Timati, Vasily Ladyuk(ru), Victor Drobysh, Victor Zinchuk
-	1	Aleksandr Marshal, Aleksandr Panayotov, Alexander Ivanov, Alexander Malinin, Alexander Rosenbaum, Alexander Shaganov, Alexander Vulykh, Alexey Belov(ru), Alexey Filatov, Alexey Romanov(ru), Alexey Tatarintsev, Alexey Vorobyov, Alliance, Aljay & Era Istrefi, Anatoly Alekseev & Artem Ivanov, Anton Luchbenko, Anton Pustovoy, Anzhelika Varum, Artik & Asti, Autoradio Festival, Autoradio Diskoteka 80s Festival, Bianka, Big Love Show Festival, Brainstorm, Butler, Chanson of the Year Awards(ru), Daniil Trifonov, Darina Ivanova, DJ Leonid Rudenko, DJ Smash, Ekaterina Mechetina, Elena Vaenga, Eljey & Feduk, Elvira T, Eva Polna, Evgeny Kungurov(ru), Filatov & Karas, Geegun(ru), Igor Morozov, Igor Nikolayev, Ivanushki International, Jah Khalib, Jenia Lubich, Kasta, Kchachatur Badalyan, Kirill Richter, Kristina Orbakaitė, Lara Deliya, Lesha Svik, Little Big, Loc-Dog(ru), L'One, Lyube, Lyubov Kazarnovskaya, Marina Devyatova, Marina Guleghina, Maruv, Masha Weber, Matrang, Max Korzh, Melnitsa, Miyagi & Andy Panda, Monatik Chilibi Sound, Monetochka, My Michelle, Na-na, Nina Shtaskaya, Noize MC, Oleg Lomovoy, Olga Kormukhina, Olga Peretyatko, Oxxxymiron, Pavel Artemyev-Druchinin, Pizza, Quest Pistols Show, Russia-1 TV channel, Sergey Trofimov, Soso Pavliashvili, ST, Sveta Aya(ru), T-Fest(ru), Tina Kuznetsova(ru), TNT TV channel, Utah, Vadim Repin, Vakhtang, Valeriy Syutkin, Varvara, Varvara Vizbor(ru), Vasily Gerello(ru), Vera Brezhneva, Veronika Dzhioeva, Viki Lee, Viktor Tretiakov, Vintage, World Cup Russia 2018 Gala Concert, Yulia Peresild, Zemfira, "ZHARA" International Music Festival, Zveri
