= Fix Everything =

2016 single by MBAND

Single by MBAND

from the album Fix Everything soundtrack
- Released: April 22, 2016
- Recorded: 2016
- Genre: Pop
- Length: 4:21
- Label: Velvet Music
- Songwriter(s): Konstantin Meladze; Artem Pindyura
- Producer(s): Konstantin Meladze

Music video
- Всё исправить (OST "Всё исправить") on YouTube

"Fix Everything" (Russian: Всё исправить) is a song written by Konstantin Meladze and Artem Pindyura and recorded by Russian boy band MBAND. It is part of the official soundtrack to the film of the same name with the members of the boy band in the lead roles. The single was released which became the official soundtrack to the film of the same name with the members of the boy band in the lead roles in April 2016.

== Background ==
In 2016, the musical group presented 2 albums at once - "No Filters" and "Acoustics", released 5 video clips for their own musical compositions. The tracks "Unbearable", "Raise Your Eyes" and "Fix Everything", included in the album "Without Filters", received video incarnations. The composition "Fix Everything" acted as a soundtrack to the Russian comedy film of the same name. But the role of the MBAND group in creating the picture was not limited to this: the soloists performed the main roles in the comedy.

The music producer of the film was Konstantin Meladze, who is the producer of the MBAND group. The film features some of the musical compositions of the MBAND group, in particular, She "Will Come Back", "Look at Me", as well as the song "Fix Everything", written by Konstantin Meladze and Artyom Pindyura specially for the film and which became its official soundtrack.

== Music video ==
At the time the film was released, Vladislav Ramm had not been part of the group for six months. In the video for the song "Fix Everything", released in April 2016, only three soloists (Nikita Kiosse, Artyom Pindyura, and Anatoly Tsoi) were filmed. The video was directed by Sergey Solodky, who had previously collaborated with MBAND for videos to the songs "She Will Return" and "Look at Me". In the video, the members of MBAND find a beautiful unconscious girl (Anna Rozputnia) on the beach. They dig out of the sand, put her in the trunk of their car, comb her hair, and change her clothes to that of a white dress.

As soon as they take her to a café, they find out that she is a dangerous robot. She effortlessly bites into a metal spoon along with the cake, accidentally breaks the edge of a wooden table with her head, and proceeds to jealously eliminate potential female rivals single-handedly. Anatoly tries to disable the girl by hitting her from behind with a baseball bat. The guys then proceed to pull out a bundle of wires from her back. With her eyes glowing orange, the girl manages to get back up and before she could strangle Nikita finally shuts down.

Artyom alongside Nikita and Anatoly next, carries the girl back to the beach where they initially found her. As soon as Artyom places her back in the sand, the girl sticks her hand in his face, which causes the guys to run off.

== Live performances ==
MBAND performed "Fix Everything" at the closing for New Wave 2016 on September 9. MBAND also performed "Fix Everything" on New Year's Eve on the First - 2017 on Channel One Russia.

== Charts ==
Chart (2016)	Peak position
General weekly chart	38
Weekly Chart by Application	17
Russian weekly chart	45
Moscow weekly chart	57
Ukrainian weekly chart
Kyiv chart
St. Petersburg chart	53
YouTube Weekly Chart	9
Russian digital tracks chart
