= Okean (Mari Kraimbrery song) =

Single by Mari Kraimbrery

from the album Nas uznayet ves mir
- Language: Russian
- Released: 24 July 2020
- Genre: Pop
- Label: Velvet Music
- Songwriter: Marina Zhadan

Mari Kraimbrery singles chronology
"Praga. Iyun" (2020)	"Okean" (2020)	"Ya ne zabudu" (2020)

Music video
- "Okean" on YouTube

"Okean" (Russian: Океан; transl. ocean) is a song by Russian singer Mari Kraimbrery, released on 24 July 2020 by Velvet Music.

== Music video ==
On 8 September 2020 on the YouTube channel Velvet Music the music video for the song «Океан» was released. The director of the video was Serghey Grey.

== Critical reception ==
Ulyana Pirogova, an internet correspondent for TNT Music, stated that the "light" mood and dance rhythm "gives "Okean" every chance of becoming a new summertime hit".

== Charts ==
=== Weekly charts ===
2020 weekly chart performance for "Okean"
Chart (2020)	Peak position
CIS Airplay (TopHit)	3
Russia Airplay (TopHit)	2

2021 weekly chart performance for "Okean"
Chart (2021)	Peak position
CIS Airplay (TopHit)	20
Russia Airplay (TopHit)	16
Ukraine Airplay (TopHit)	74

2022 weekly chart performance for "Okean"
Chart (2022)	Peak position
CIS Airplay (TopHit)	75
Russia Airplay (TopHit)	63

2023 weekly chart performance for "Okean"
Chart (2023)	Peak position
CIS Airplay (TopHit)	115
Lithuania Airplay (TopHit)	171
Moldova Airplay (TopHit)	48
Russia Airplay (TopHit)	84

2024 weekly chart performance for "Okean"
Chart (2024)	Peak position
CIS Airplay (TopHit)	168
Kazakhstan Airplay (TopHit)	95
Moldova Airplay (TopHit)	131
Russia Airplay (TopHit)	106

2025 weekly chart performance for "Okean"
Chart (2025)	Peak position
CIS Airplay (TopHit)	160
Kazakhstan Airplay (TopHit)	89
Moldova Airplay (TopHit)	139
Russia Airplay (TopHit)	97

2026 weekly chart performance for "Okean"
Chart (2026)	Peak position
CIS Airplay (TopHit)	176
Kazakhstan Airplay (TopHit)	49
Moldova Airplay (TopHit)	149
Russia Airplay (TopHit)	123

=== Monthly charts ===
2020 Monthly chart performance for "Okean"
Chart (2020)	Peak position
CIS Airplay (TopHit)	6
Latvia Airplay (LaIPA)	51
Russia Airplay (TopHit)	2

2021 Monthly chart performance for "Okean"
Chart (2021)	Peak position
CIS Airplay (TopHit)	21
Russia Airplay (TopHit)	16
Ukraine Airplay (TopHit)	77

2022 Monthly chart performance for "Okean"
Chart (2022)	Peak position
Russia Airplay (TopHit)	83

2023 Monthly chart performance for "Okean"
Chart (2023)	Peak position
Moldova Airplay (TopHit)	62
Russia Airplay (TopHit)	95

2026 Monthly chart performance for "Okean"
Chart (2026)	Peak position
Kazakhstan Airplay (TopHit)	77

=== Year-end charts ===
2020 year-end chart performance for "Okean"
Chart (2020)	Position
CIS Airplay (TopHit)	49
Russia Airplay (TopHit)	35

2021 year-end chart performance for "Okean"
Chart (2021)	Position
CIS Airplay (TopHit)	62
Russia Airplay (TopHit)	55

2022 year-end chart performance for "Okean"
Chart (2022)	Position
CIS Airplay (TopHit)	182
Russia Airplay (TopHit)	142

2023 year-end chart performance for "Okean"
Chart (2023)	Position
Moldova Airplay (TopHit)	123
Russia Airplay (TopHit)	163

2024 year-end chart performance for "Okean"
Chart (2024)	Position
Russia Airplay (TopHit)	164

2025 year-end chart performance for "Okean"
Chart (2025)	Position
Russia Airplay (TopHit)	157

== Awards and nominations ==
Year	Award	Nomination	Results	Ref.
2020	Pesnya goda		Won	
2021	Zhara Music Awards	Best female video	Nominated	
2021	Golden Gramophone Award		Won	
