= First Day Out (Kizaru album) =

Studio album by Kizaru
- Released: July 1, 2022
- Genre: Hip hop
- Length: 22:52
- Languages: Russian, English
- Label: Haunted Family

First Day Out (Russian: «Первый день на свободе») is the seventh studio album by Russian and Spanish hip-hop singer Kizaru. It was released on 1 July 2022 through the label Haunted Family, the distributor being Zvonko Digital. The deluxe version of the album was released on VK Music along with the rest of the album, and was released on other platforms on July 31st.

== Promotion ==
At midnight on July 1, 2022, with the release of the album, a chatbot became available in the artist's group in VK. By sending a private message to the group, users would receive a voice message and video from Kizaru and a chance to win branded Haunted Family merchandise, as well as exclusive access to the album's final track, which would be available exclusively on VK Music for a month. Voice messages would be sent to users as they listened to the album.

== Track listing ==
Standard edition of First Day Out
No.	Title	Writer(s)	Producer(s)	Length
1.	"Playa" (featuring Duke Deuce)	Duke Deuce, Mithad Melikov, Oleg Nechiporenko	YG Woods, DatBoiRiaa	3:12
2.	"Train Wreck"	Melikov, Nechiporenko	YG Woods, DatBoiRiaa	2:02
3.	"Yeah"	Dmitry Andrienko, Nechiporenko	jumpmvn	2:07
4.	"First Day Out"	Vladimir Vasiliev, Andrienko, Miltiadis Partalis, Nechiporenko	jumpmvn, Blondobeats, Blazerfxme	2:14
5.	"Hella Faded"	Melikov, Nechiporenko	YG Woods, DatBoiRiaa	2:40
6.	"That White"	Vitaly Kamalov, Andrienko, Nechiporenko	jumpmvn, LetDose	3:08
7.	"Elon Musk"	Melikov, Nechiporenko	YG Woods	2:43
8.	"No Stop"	Nechiporenko	BandPla, CLDHRT	2:19
9.	"Trap Shark"	Maximilian Rostoropa, Nechiporenko	Milian Beatz, Splited Stupid, whitebackisback	2:26
Total length:				22:52

Deluxe Version
No.	Title	Writer(s)	Producers	Length
10.	"Top Stunna"	Rostoropa, Nechiporenko	Milian Beatz, Splited Stupid, whitebackisback	3:22
Total length:				26:14
