= Victoria Kokhana =

Ukrainian musical artist

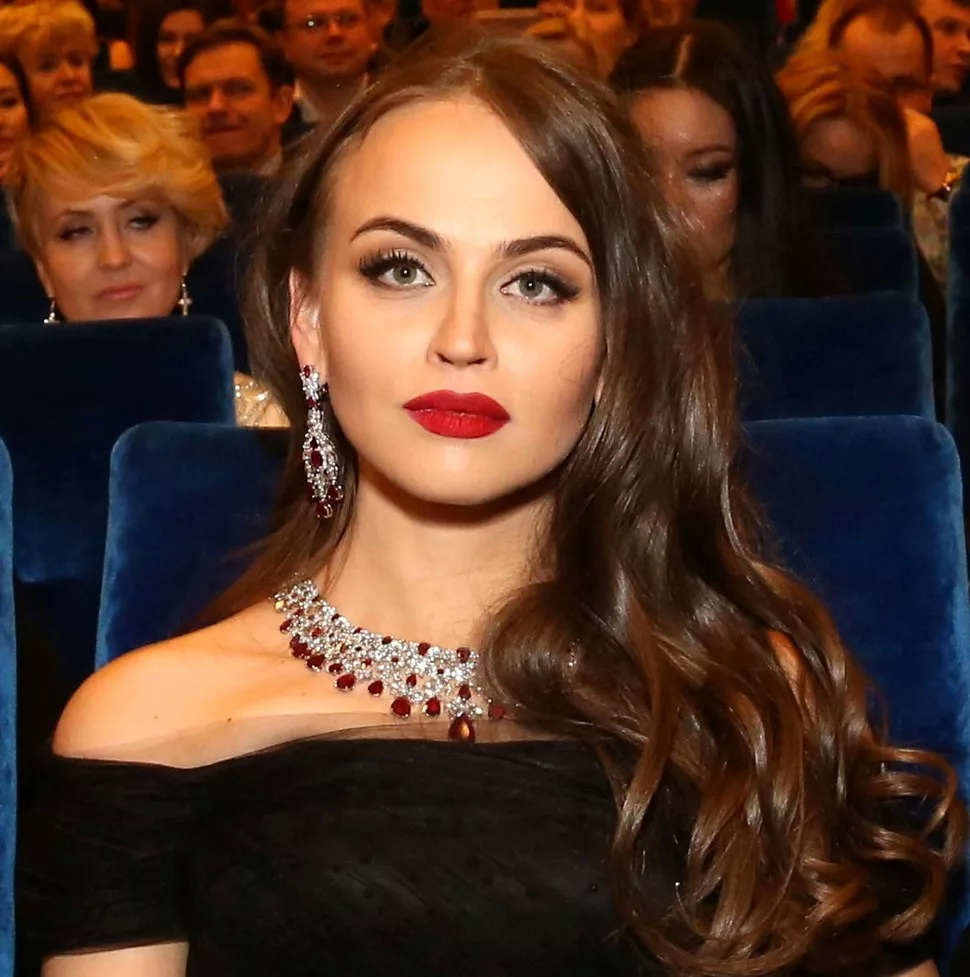
- Born: Victoria Kushch; May 27, 1990 (age 36); Kyiv, Ukrainian SSR, Soviet Union
- Other names: Victoria Kokhana, Toriya Tal

Victoria Kokhana Kushch (also known as Toria Tal, born on May 27, 1990, Kyiv) is a Ukrainian musician.

== Biography ==
Victoria Kokhana was born on 27 May 1990 in Kyiv, into a Ukrainian family. She began studying music at the age of five. She graduated from the Lysenko Music School, later completing the Department of Choral Conducting (class of Professor O. Tymoshenko) and the Department of Composition (class of Professor L. Dychko) at the Petro Tchaikovsky National Music Academy of Ukraine (Kyiv Conservatory).

== Career ==
=== 2006–2013 ===
After graduating from the conservatory, Kokhana devoted herself to the pop music industry. Her experience as a composer and sound producer helped her to gain recognition, and she contributed to the creation of songs and albums for a number of artists.

Kokhana was the author of the popular song "Nomer Odin" for the group NuAngels, as well as serving as an arranger on several of their other compositions. The album became a record holder for the number of copies sold in Ukraine, and was honoured with a prestigious "Gold Record" award by the IFPI, one of the oldest music industry associations in Europe. Two songs from the album were selected for the compilation 50 Best Songs of Ukraine, and the track "Yura, I'm Sorry" was ranked among the ten most successful songs of the decade by Russkoye Radio Ukraine. Among the best-known works from this early period are "You Are One of Those", "Yura, I'm Sorry", "I Know It's You", "Boy" and "Hanky-Panky". "You Are One of Those" and "Yura, I'm Sorry" were laureates of the Song of the Year festival in 2006 and 2007 respectively.

=== 2014 ===
During this period, Kokhana collaborated extensively with a number of popular performers from Ukraine and Russia. In 2014, she wrote songs for the Ukrainian group NikitA ("Master" and "Do What You Want") and served as sound producer for Natasha Korolyova's new album, "Magic of L." Kokhana gained popularity in Russia after writing the music for the duet "Depraved By You", performed by Aleksander Marshal and Natasha Korolyova, as well as the composition "My Mature One" for the singer Slava. Later that year, both "Depraved By You" and "My Mature One" won "Song of the Year".

=== 2015 ===
In 2015, the music Kokhana composed for the video "Depraved By You" won the "Fashion Video" category at the annual Fashion People Awards. Kokhana herself was honoured at the same ceremony as "Music Industry Discovery of the Year" for her work as a composer and sound producer. Her single "You Know" was also unanimously recognised by Ukrainian radio stations as the most rotated hit of 2015. That year, two further songs written by Kokhana were among the winners of the "Song of the Year" festival: "Your Beloved Embrace", performed by Taisia Povaliy, and the ballad "This Year of Love", performed by Zara.

=== 2016 ===
Victoria Kokhana's composition "Your Beloved Embrace", written for Taisia Povaliy, was unanimously declared the winner of the music competition "Chanson of the Year", held at the State Kremlin Palace. At the "New Wave 2016" festival in Sochi that September, Kokhana's song "Tea With Milk", also performed by Povaliy, received the highest ratings from music critics. In December 2016, two further songs written by Kokhana were named as laureates of the "Song of the Year" festival: "Crazy Happiness", performed by Anita Tsoy, and "Tea with Milk", performed by Taisia Povaliy.

=== 2017 ===
In April 2017, three singles written by Kokhana were included in the list of the best songs at the pop music award "Chanson of the Year": "Tea With Milk", performed by Taisia Povaliy, "Crazy Happiness", performed by Anita Tsoy, and "Gaps of Love", performed by Irina Krug. Two further compositions by Kokhana were premièred at the "New Wave 2017" music festival: "Autumn Under the Feet on the Soles", performed by Natasha Korolyova, and "Landmark of Love", performed by Tamara Gverdtsiteli. Both songs quickly won the affection of the festival's large audience.

In November 2017, the songs "Heart Is a House for Love" (Taisia Povaliy) and "Crazy Happiness" (Anita Tsoy) became winners of the "Golden Gramophone" award.

On 2 December 2017, four of Kokhana's songs were named as laureates of the country's oldest music festival, "Song of the Year": "Not Just Love" (Anna Semenovich), "Landmark of Love" (Tamara Gverdtsiteli), "Heart Is the House for Love" (Taisia Povaliy) and "Autumn Under the Feet on the Soles" (Natasha Korolyova). On 13 December 2017, Kokhana was ranked among the top five composers at the Russian National Music Award 2017 and was nominated for the title "Composer of the Year".

=== 2018 ===
In April 2018, four songs of Victoria Kokhana were recognized as laureates of the "Chanson of the Year" award. Among them were: "In The House Where My Sadness Lives" (Tatiana Bulanova), "Zinaida" (Na-na), "Autumn Under The Feet On The Soles" (Natasha Korolyova) and "Heart Is A House For Love" (Taisia Povaliy). In September, three of Victoria's compositions were performed at the "New Wave" festival in Sochi: "Happy Birthday!" (Nikolay Baskov), "Your Kiss" (Slava) and "Look Into My Eyes" (Taisia Povaliy). In November, the song "Look Into My Eyes" received the "Golden Gramophone" award. In December 2018 three songs, put to the music of Victoria, became laureates of the main music festival in Russia - "Song of the Year": "Happy Birthday" (Nikolay Baskov), "Look Into My Eyes" (Taisia Povaliy) and "Your Kiss" (Slava). On December 7, at the 4th ceremony of the Russian National Music Award, she was nominated for "Composer of the Year" with her song "Look Into My Eyes".

=== 2019 ===
On March 26, 2019, by the decree of the President of Ukraine, Kokhana was granted the honorary title of "Honored Art Worker of Ukraine" for "creating highly artistic works in the field of music, as well as for activities of organization in the cultural sphere".

On April 20, 2019, three songs, composed by Kokhana, became winners of the "Chanson of the Year" award: "Search For Me Or Don't" (Irina Krug), "Landmark Of Love" (Tamara Gverdtsiteli), and "Look Into My Eyes" (Taisia Povaliy). In addition, a new composition was presented at the concert: "Let's Forbid It To Separation", performed by Tamara Gverdtsiteli and Stas Mikhaylov.

In July 2019, within the framework of the International Festival "White Nights of St. Petersburg", spectators greeted Kokhana's songs with applause: "Landmark Of Love" (Tamara Gverdtsiteli), "Let's Forbid It To Separation" (T. Gverdtsiteli and S. Mikhailov), "Your Beloved Embrace" (Taisia Povaliy)," This Year Of Love" (Zara), as well as a completely new song, "Heart To Heart", performed by Nikolay Baskov.

Kokhana is currently working on a new album.

=== 2020 ===
In April 2020, two music compositions by V. Kohana received the award of the newspaper Moskovsky Komsomolets — ZD AWARDS-2019: «Let's Forbid It To Separation» performed by T. Gverdtsiteli and S. Mikhailov became the best in the category «Duet of the Year», and «Heart To Heart», performed by Nikolay Baskov received a special prize as the most rotated song on the chart «Most Russian Hit».

In December 2020 Victoria Kohana was recognized as one of the best composers of the year at the Russian National Music Award, and Fabrica band with the song «Call Me, Be Brave» on music by Kohana, shortlisted for the award as the Best Pop Group in the country.

4 songs written by Victoria Kohana were performed on December 5 at the festival «Song of the Year»: «Love is immortal» performed by Nikolay Baskov, «Special words» (Taisia Povaliy), «Call Me, Be Brave» (Fabrica band) and «Only For Redheads» (Ivanushki International band).

At the moment, a new album by Victoria Kohana is being prepared for the release, which will feature songs by the composer, written in collaboration with famous poets, and among the performers of the album are the first stars of the Russian stage.

== Awards ==
Kokhana is a winner of the "Gold Record" Award from the International Federation of the Phonographic Industry. She has also won multiple other awards including Song of the Year, Chanson of the Year, the Golden Gramophone Award, the Russian National Music Award, and others.

=== State awards ===
- Honored Art Worker of Ukraine (2019)

=== Professional awards and prizes ===
- 18 laureates of the song festival "Song of the Year"
- 12 "Chanson of the Year" awards
- 3 "Golden Gramophone" statuettes
- 2 "Fashion People Award" 2015 nominations

== Notable songs ==
Songs put to the music of Victoria Kokhana
Year of release	Song title and video clip link	Performing musician	Notes
2006	You Are One Of Those	NuAngels	The laureate of the festival «Song of the Year 2006»
2006	Yura, I'm Sorry	NuAngels	The laureate of the festival «Song of the Year 2007»
2007	Boy	NuAngels	
2007	I Know It's You	NuAngels	
2008	Hanky-Panky	NuAngels	
2014	Master	NikitA	
2014	Do What You Want	NikitA	
2014	Depraved By You	Korolyova Natasha & Marshal Aleksander	The laureate of the festival «Song of the Year 2014»
2014	My Mature One	Slava	The laureate of the festival «Song of the Year 2014»
2015	You Know	NuAngels	
2015	Your Beloved Embrace	Povaliy Taisia	The laureate of the festival «Song of the Year 2015», of the award «Chanson of the Year 2016»
2015	This Year Of Love	Zara	The laureate of the festival «Song of the Year 2015»
2015	Call Me, Be Brave	Rubanovskaya Maria	
2016	Not Just Love	Semenovich Anna	The song is co-authored with Alexey Romanof The laureate of the festival «Song of the Year 2017»
2016	Tea With Milk	Povaliy Taisia	The laureate of the festival «Song of the Year 2016», of the award «Chanson of the Year 2017»
2016	A Piece Of Plombiere Ice-Cream	Rybin Victor & Senchukova Natalia	The song is co-authored with Anatoliy Zubkov The laureate of the award «Chanson of the Year 2016»
2016	Crazy Happiness	Tsoy Anita	The laureate of the festival «Song of the Year 2016», of the awards «Chanson of the Year 2017» and «Golden Gramophone 2017»
2016	Gaps Of Love	Krug Irina	The laureate of the award «Chanson of the Year 2017»
2017	One Hundred Lakes And Five Seas	Slava	The song is co-authored with Sergey Revtov
2017	Heart Is A House To Love	Povaliy Taisia	The laureate of the award «Golden Gramophone 2017», of the festival «Song of the Year 2017», of the award «Chanson of the Year 2018»
2017	Zinaida	Na-Na	The laureate of the award «Chanson of the Year 2018»
2017	Autumn Under The Feet On The Soles	Korolyova Natasha	The song is co-authored with Aleksander Sokolov The laureate of the festival «Song of the Year 2017», of the award «Chanson of the Year 2018»
2017	Landmark Of Love	Gverdtsiteli Tamara	The laureate of the festival «Song of the Year 2017», of the award «Chanson of the Year 2019»
2017	In The House Where My Sadness Lives	Bulanova Tatiana	The song is co-authored with Maksim Pokrovskiy The laureate of the award «Chanson of the Year 2018»
2018	Look Into My Eyes	Povaliy Taisia	The laureate of the award «Golden Gramophone 2018», of the festival «Song of the Year 2018» and of the award «Chanson of the Year 2019»
2018	Your Kiss	Slava	The laureate of the festival «Song of the Year 2018»
2018	Only For Redheads	Ivanushki International	The song is co-authored with Alexey Romanof
2018	Search For Me Or Don't	Krug Irina	The laureate of the festival «Chanson of the Year 2018»
2018	Happy Birthday	Baskov Nikolay	The laureate of the festival «Song of the Year 2018»
2019	I Will Be Yours	Povaliy Taisia	The laureate of the festival «Song of the Year 2019»
2019	Let's Forbid It To Separation	Gverdtsiteli Tamara, Mikhaylov Stas	The laureate of the festival «Song of the Year 2019»
2019	Heart On Heart	Baskov Nikolay	The laureate of the festival «Song of the Year 2019»
2020	Special words	Povaliy Taisia	The laureate of the festival «Song of the Year 2020»
2020	Call Me, Be Brave	Fabrica, band	The laureate of the festival «Song of the Year 2020»
2020	Love is immortal	Baskov Nikolay	The laureate of the festival «Song of the Year 2020»

Albums Kokhana acts as a producer on:

1. "Apricot Dreams" (music D. Migdal, performer Natasha Korolyova);
2. "Depraved By You" (music Victoria Kokhana, performers Natasha Korolyova and Aleksander Marshal)
3. "My Mature One" (music Victoria Kokhana, performer Slava)
4. "Your Beloved Embrace" (music Victoria Kokhana, performer Taisia Povaliy)
5. "There Is No Word Like 'Me'" (music A. Pryazhnikov, performer Natasha Korolyova)
6. "Formula Of Happiness" (music Sergey Revtov, performer Valeriya)
7. "This Year Of Love" (music Victoria Kokhana, performer Zara)
8. "Rainbow - Smile of God" (music Sergei Revtov, performer Turetsky Choir)
9. "Tea with milk" (music Victoria Kokhana, performer Taisia Povaliy)
10. "I'm Tired..." (music Maxim Pokrovsky, performer Natasha Korolyova)
11. "A Piece of Plombier Ice-cream" (music Victoria Kokhana - A. Zubkov, performers Victor Rybin and Natalia Senchukova)
12. "You Know" (music A. Ktitarev, performer Turetsky Choir)
