= Zhadan =

Zhadan (Ukrainian: Жадан) is a gender-neutral Slavic surname. It may refer to:

- Marina Zhadan (better known as Mari Kraimbrery; born 1992), Ukrainian and Russian musician
- Serhiy Zhadan (born 1974), Ukrainian writer
