= NSouth+ =

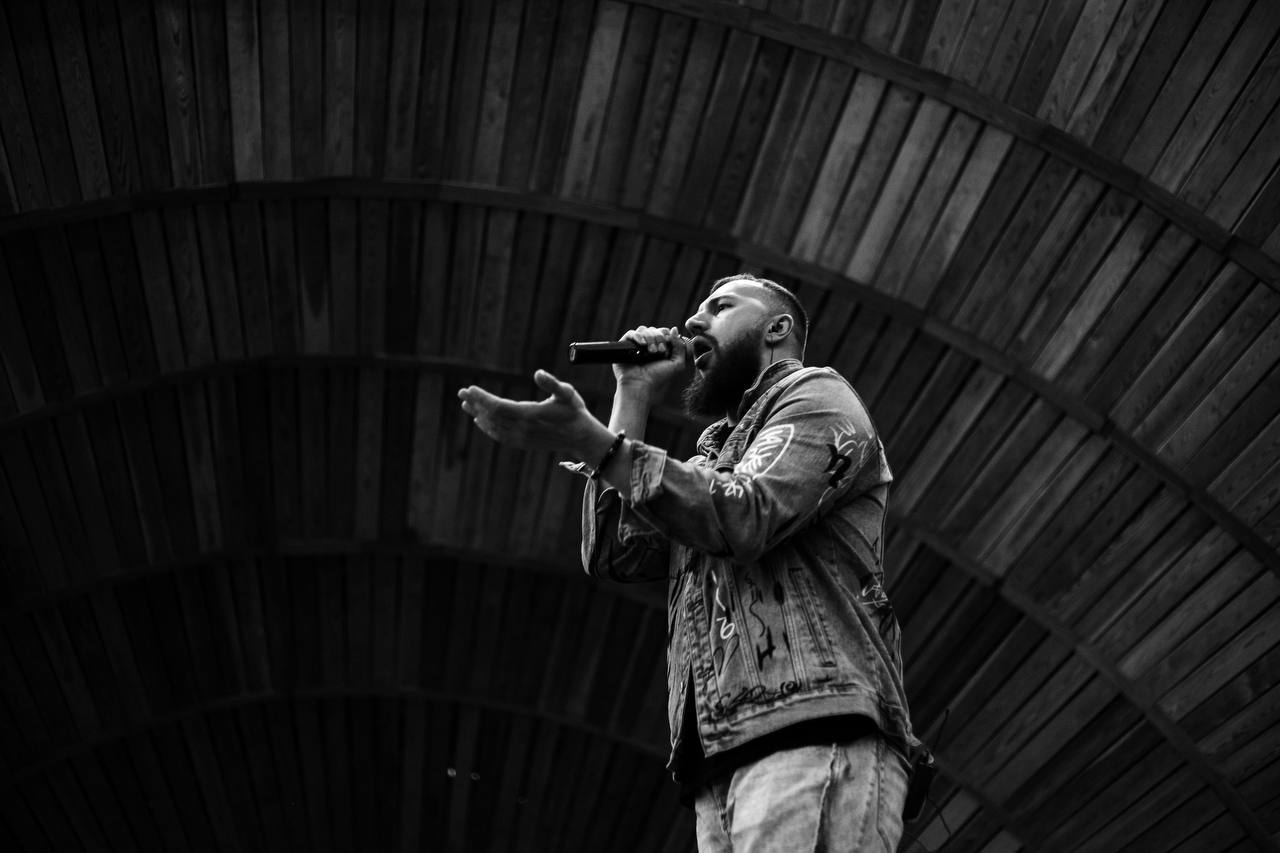

Background information
- Born: Danila Alexandrovich Sevryugin; July 21; Nizhniy Novgorod, Nizhny Novgorod Oblast, Russia
- Origin: Russia
- Genres: Hip-hop, alternative rap, pop-music, trap, electro, pop-rap, rap-rock, rapcore, gangsta-rap
- Occupations: Musician, record producer, singer
- Instruments: FL Studio, vocals, piano, Logic Pro
- Years active: 2020–present
- Labels: VIRTUAL STATION

Danila Alexandrovich Sevryugin (Russian: Данила Александрович Севрюгин, born July 21, Nizhniy Novgorod, Nizhny Novgorod Oblast, Russia), better known by his stage name NSouth+, is a Russian musician, singer, record producer, songwriter and audio engineer.

The co-founder of the VIRTUAL STATION music association, for all the time of producing, he has released and created more than 70 compositions of various styles: hip-hop, pop, rock, electro, disco, synthwave. He also actively collaborated with Brook Beatz & Marko Lenz, DJ Khaled, Lil Baby and Future, and also produced artists: Rod Wave, NBA YoungBoy, Homixide Gang, Kizaru, Bouncegohard, Tory Lanez, CashDrug.

Also, the music single "See you later" was in the rotation of New Radio 99.3 FM New York City, and the song "Warmth" has been popular with listeners in the US and Europe for several months, on Spotify and AppleMusic platforms. The single "M4" has been in radio rotation for a long time." in the DPR and LPR and Radio Tavria in the Kherson Oblast.

== Biography ==
Born on July 21 in the city of Nizhny Novgorod (Nizhny Novgorod Oblast), from early childhood he was fond of music and writing various musical compositions. He started releasing various music singles in early 2020, and his first project was the music single "District52".

After the successful release of the previous release, a few months later he releases the musical single "Metaphors" together with the musical artist TRIPPY MANE.

After releasing several successful projects, he became the founder of the VIRTUAL STATION. He also actively collaborated with Brook Beatz & Marko Lenz, DJ Khaled, Lil Baby and Future, and also produced artists: Rod Wave, NBA YoungBoy, Homixide Gang, Kizaru, Bouncegohard, Tory Lanez, CashDrug.

Also, the music single "See you later" was in the rotation of New Radio 99.3 FM New York City, and the song "Warmth" has been popular with listeners in the USA and Europe for several months, on Spotify and AppleMusic platforms. The single "M4" has been in radio rotation for a long time." in the DPR and LPR and Radio Tavria in the Kherson Oblast.

== Discography ==
=== Studio albums ===
Name	Info	Note
«Не похоже ни на что»	Release date: March 8, 2022; Label: VIRTUAL STATION; Format: digital distribution	
«Сатурн»	Release date: December 17, 2023; Label: VIRTUAL STATION; Format: digital distribution	

=== EP ===
- 2022 — «Гигрометр»

=== Singles ===
Years	Name	Note
2020	District52	
2020	Metaphors (feat. TRIPPY MANE)	
2020	Like!	
2020	See You Later	
2021	Шум от колонок	
2021	Бэксит фристайл (feat. Пафи, ALLK1DE)	
2021	Бездушие (feat. Самфиньенш Журалье)	
2021	Дикий Запад (feat. ALLK1DE)	
2021	I Feel (feat. chunya33)	
2021	Свет (feat. Gorkyya)	
2022	Late Night (feat. chunya33, ALLK1DE)	
2022	Не грущу (feat. chunya33)	
2022	Bloom (feat. ALLK1DE)	
2022	Как так?	
2022	Штормит (feat. Puffy Puff)	
2022	Бык	
2022	Rock Life (feat. Brook Beatz, FANTANA)	
2022	My God (feat. Marc Drell)	
2022	Стразы (feat. Marc Drell)	
2022	Тепло (feat. Colorado)	
2022	Грозовые облака (feat. Marc Drell)	
2022	Oldboy (feat. Brook Beatz)	
2022	Сильные (feat. ALLK1DE)	
2022	Ритмы (feat. Marc Drell)	
2022	Gonna Crazy (feat. Colorado)	
2022	Sakura (feat. Marc Drell)	
2022	Vampiros (feat. Marc Drell)	
2022	Сделал Stack (feat. Marc Drell)	
2022	Глубокий смысл (feat. Marc Drell)	
2022	Masks (feat. Marc Drell)	
2023	Valentines Day (feat. Brook Beatz, Colorado)	
2023	Good Fellas (feat. Marc Drell)	
2023	Любовь не болезнь (feat. Brook Beatz)	
2023	My Chance (feat. Brook Beatz)	
2023	Virtual Combat (feat. Bouncegohard)	
2023	Дожил (feat. Marc Drell)	
2023	Сделка с... (feat. Brook Beatz)	
2023	Online (feat. Brook Beatz, Colorado)	
2024	Я не буду (feat. Colorado)	
2024	Верчал станция (feat. Brook Beatz)	
2024	Добрая (feat. Marc Drell)	
2024	Городская суета (feat. Marc Drell)	
2024	M4	
2025	Virtual Drill (feat. Killa Killo)	
2025	Стать тобой (feat. Brook Beatz, Colorado)	
2025	Ереван (feat. Brook Beatz)	
2025	Tamagotchi	
2025	Шум воды	
2025	Как ты там (feat. Brook Beatz)	
2025	Художник (feat. Cashdrug, Boeing Boy)	
2025	Ephemeral Merchant (feat. Brook Beatz, Colorado)	
2025	Вечность (feat. Marc Drell, Colorado)	
2025	Столица закатов: ритм улиц и поэзия выживания (feat. Cashdrug, Boeing Boy)	
