= Hoodrich Pablo Juan =

American rapper (born 1988)

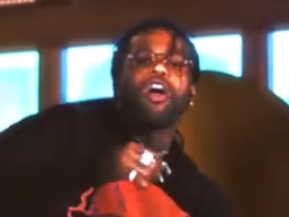
- Pennix in 2018

Background information
- Born: Sterling Leroy Pennix Jr. October 28, 1989 (age 36); Newark, New Jersey, U.S.
- Origin: Atlanta, Georgia, U.S.
- Occupations: Rapper; songwriter
- Years active: 2014–present
- Labels: MPR; EMPIRE; Hoodrich (Current); Alamo; 1017

Sterling Leroy Pennix Jr. (born October 28, 1989), better known by his stage name Hoodrich Pablo Juan, is an American rapper. He is best known for his collaborations with fellow rapper Lil Baby, and his track "We Don't Luv Em".

== Career ==
Pennix started pursuing a rap career in 2014 after he released a song titled "Go Get Money" and featured on a Peewee Longway track titled "African Diamonds". He released a string of mixtapes during 2015 to 2017, and was later signed to Gucci Mane's label 1017 Records. He gained attention with his track "We Don't Luv Em".

In 2020, Pennix was arrested on RICO charges. In 2022, he was sentenced to 5 years in prison, from 15 years prior to a plea bargain. He was released on October 19th 2025.

== Discography ==
=== Studio albums ===
Title	Album details
Designer Drugz 3	Released: October 6, 2017; Label: MPR, Hoodrich, Empire; Format: Digital download, streaming
DMV	Released: November 1, 2019; Label: MPR, 1017, Alamo; Format: Digital download, streaming
The Bloprint	Released: September 11, 2026; Label: Money World; Format: Digital download, streaming

=== Mixtapes ===
Title	Mixtape details	Peak chart positions
Title	Mixtape details	US OST
Designer Drugz	Released: March 24, 2015; Label: Hoodrich; Format: Digital download, streaming	—
Million Dollar Plugs (with Jose Guapo)	Released: May 7, 2015; Label: MPR, Hoodrich; Format: Digital download, streaming	—
Mony Powr Rspt: Designer Drugz Edition	Released: May 7, 2015; Label: MPR; Format: Digital download, streaming	—
Auto Juan	Released: September 1, 2015; Label: MPR, Hoodrich; Format: Digital download, streaming	—
P.S.C.: Da Grand Hussle (with Johnny Cinco)	Released: September 14, 2015; Label: MPR; Format: Digital download, streaming	—
15	Released: January 27, 2016; Label: MPR, Hoodrich; Format: Digital download, streaming	—
Designer Drugz 2	Released: April 8, 2016; Label: Hoodrich; Format: Digital download, streaming	—
Mony Powr Rspt World (with Drugrixh Peso)	Released: August 17, 2016; Label: MPR, Hoodrich; Format: Digital download, streaming	—
Master Sensei	Released: August 18, 2016; Label: MPR, Hoodrich; Format: Digital download, streaming	—
Million Dollar Plugs 2 (with Jose Guapo)	Released: November 27, 2016; Label: MPR, Hoodrich; Format: Digital download, streaming	—
Mony Powr Rspt World Rules (with Drugrixh Peso)	Released: April 9, 2017; Label: MPR, Hoodrich; Format: Digital download, streaming	—
Hoodwolf (with Danny Wolf)	Released: May 5, 2017; Label: MPR, Hoodrich; Format: Digital download, streaming	—
Dirty Money Power Respect (with Blacc Zacc)	Released: August 2, 2017; Label: 916%; Format: Digital download, streaming	—
Rich Hood	Released: January 5, 2018; Label: 916%; Format: Digital download, streaming	—
Hoodwolf 2 (with Danny Wolf)	Released: July 20, 2018; Label: 1017, Alamo; Format: Digital download, streaming	—
BLO: The Movie	Released: May 3, 2019; Label: MPR, 1017, Alamo; Format: Digital download, streaming	13
Hood Champ	Released: May 22, 2020; Label: MPR, Empire; Format: Digital download, streaming	—
Master Sensei 2	Released: October 30, 2020; Label: MPR, Empire; Format: Digital download, streaming	—
Designer Dope Boyz	Released: June 25, 2021; Label: MPR, Empire; Format: Digital download, streaming	—
Free Hood	Released: December 17, 2021; Label: MPR, Empire; Format: Digital download, streaming	—

=== Extended plays ===
Title	EP details
Guerilla Warfare	Released: September 1, 2015; Label: MPR, Hoodrich; Format: Digital download, streaming
Poppi Seed Connect (with Johnny Cinco)	Released: September 2, 2015; Label: BMM; Format: Digital download, streaming
South Dark (with Kenny Beats)	Released: August 8, 2017; Label: D.O.T.S; Format: Digital download, streaming
The Matrix (with Brodinski)	Released: February 23, 2018; Label: Broyal, MPR, Empire; Format: Digital download, streaming

=== Singles ===
==== As lead artist ====
Title	Year	Album
"From the Hood"	2016	Master Sensei
"Clean Lean"	2016	Master Sensei
"I Can" (with Migos)	2017	Non-album singles
"Diamond Dance" (featuring Famous Dex and Rich the Kid)	2017	Non-album singles
"I Used To" (with Drugrixh Peso)	2017	Mony Powr Rspt World Rules
"Buss Down" (with Drugrixh Peso)	2017	Mony Powr Rspt World Rules
"Zambamafoo" (with Lil Uzi Vert or remix including Lil Yachty)	2017	Designer Drugz 3
"Back and Forth" (with Gunna)	2017	Non-album single
"We Don't Luv Em" (solo or remix featuring Gucci Mane)	2018	Designer Drugz 3
"Screaming Slatt" (featuring Young Thug)	2019	BLO: The Movie
"Shoebox" (with Gucci Mane featuring Nav)	2019	BLO: The Movie
"Can't Fall N Luv" (featuring Smooky MarGielaa)	2019	BLO: The Movie
"Slang Dope"	2019	BLO: The Movie
"Honey's Kettle" (with Kizaru)	2020	Born to Trap

==== As featured artist ====
Title	Year	Album
"Trap Dab Freestyle" (Migos featuring Peewee Longway, Jose Guapo, and Hoodrich Pablo Juan)	2014	Designer Drugz and Million Dollar Plugs
"Almighty" (Gunna featuring Hoodrich Pablo Juan)	2018	Drip Season 3
"Boss Bitch" (Lil Baby featuring Hoodrich Pablo Juan)	2018	Harder Than Ever
"Alchoholic" (Dylan The Teen featuring Hoodrich Pablo Juan & YoungBoy Never Broke Again)	2018	Non-album single
