= MBAND =

Russian boy band

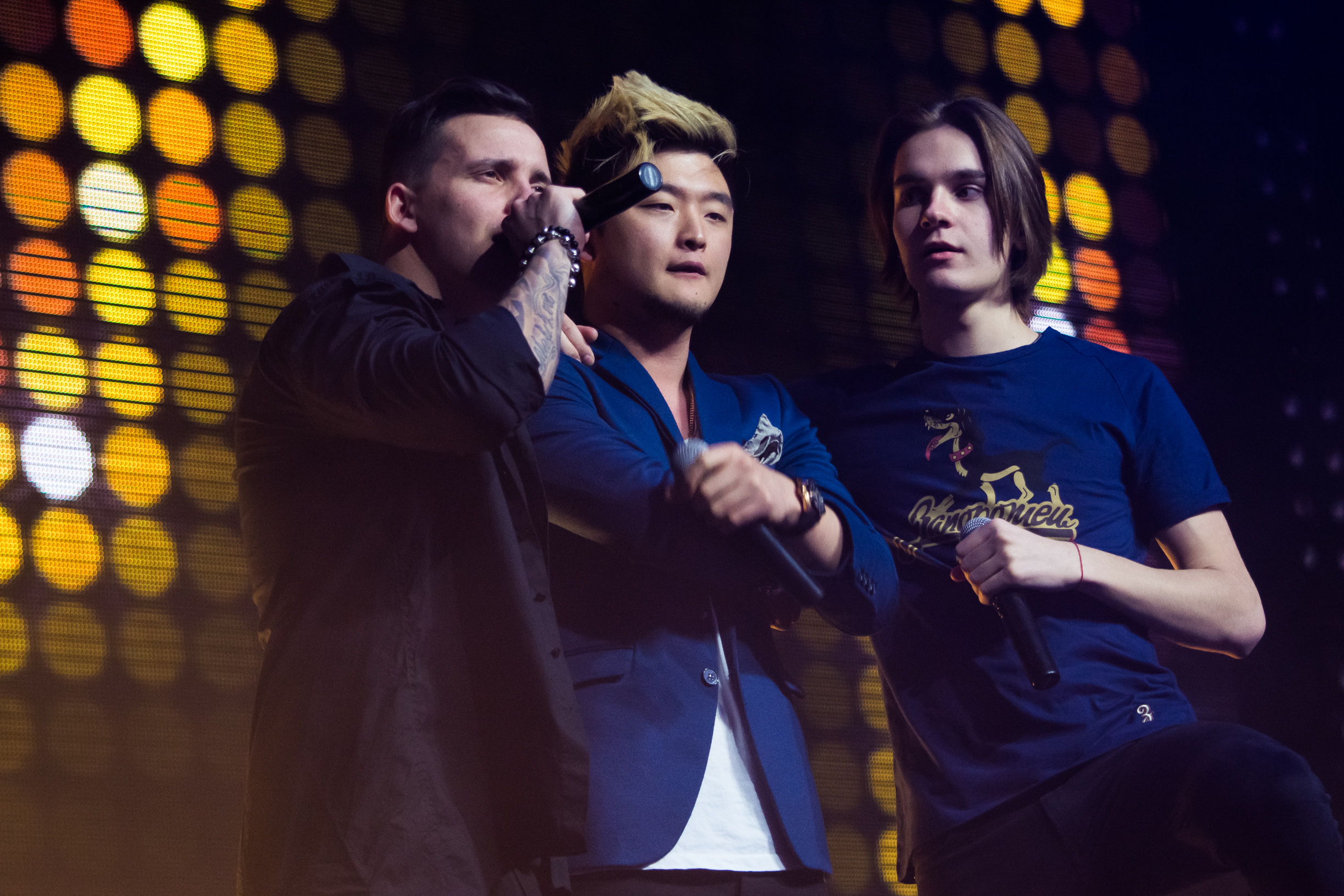
- The current formation of the band at the concert "Devichnik Teens" in Izvestia Hall

Background information
- Origin: Moscow, Russia
- Genres: Pop; Pop-rap; Dance-pop
- Years active: 2014–2020
- Labels: Velvet Music (2014–2017); Meladze Music (2017–2020)
- Past members: Vladislav Ramm (2014–2015); Anatoly Tsoi (2014–2020); Artyom Pindyura (2014–2020); Nikita Kiosse (2014–2020)
- Website: mband.ru

MBAND is a Russian boy band, founded by producer and composer Konstantin Meladze.

The group was established on November 22, 2014 after the grand final of the singing competition "I Want to Meladze". The band's first single, "She will be back", has become one of the most played songs in Russia in 2015.

The MBAND additionally won awards such as Golden Gramophone Award, Song of the Year, "RU.TV Award", and "Real Music Box Prize". In 2015, the group won the MTV Europe Music Award for Best Russian Act and was awarded "Discovery of the Year in Popular Music" at the Russian National Music Awards. They were also presented as "Russian musical breakthrough of the year" at the 2015 American Nickelodeon Kids' Choice Awards.

On April 28, 2016, the musical comedy film Fix Everything starring the group was released in Russia, which also starred Nikolay Baskov and other Russian actors.

== History ==
=== Show "I want to Meladze" ===
After the successful reality show "I Want to VIA Gra" which sought new members for the girl group Nu Virgos, Konstantin Meladze made a decision to start a project to search for participants of a new boy band under his leadership. April 30, 2014, it was announced the start of the casting for young people from the CIS countries. The show premiered in Russia (NTV), Belarus (ONT) and Kazakhstan (Seventh) on September 6, 2014, and in Ukraine (Ukraine) on September 7, 2014. At the initial stages of the show the participants were chosen by the jury. Its chairman was Konstantin Meladze himself, in addition, Anna Sedokova, Polina Gagarina and Eva Polna entered the women's jury, Sergey Lazarev, Vladimir Presnyakov Jr. and Timati joined the men's jury. November 22, 2014, in the Grand Final, the winners were chosen by the audience through SMS-voting. By its results, the four defeated Anatoliy Tsoi, Artem Pindyura, Nikita Kiosse and Vladislav Ramm.

=== History of the established group ===
In December 2014, the collective, named MBAND, presented its debut video for the song "Ona vernyotsa". For the first time the composition was presented during the Grand Final of the show "I Want to Meladze", and officially as a single was released on November 24, 2014. Music for it was written by Konstantin Meladze, the lyrics of the song are the joint work of Konstantin and Artem Pindyura. For five months, the video clip, shot by Sergei Solodky, scored over 10 million views on YouTube's video service. The single "Ona vernyotsa" also became successful: for two weeks it was at the top of the Golden Gramophone Award hit parade, subsequently receiving the award of this prize, led the Russian radiochart Tophit, and a similar Kyiv radio chat.

The first major performance of the band was the appearance on the annual large-scale concert "Big Love Show 2015", organized on February 14, 2015 by the radio station "Love Radio". After that, the band began to actively tour. In March 2015, the second single entitled "Give Me" was released. At the end of the same month, the results of the "Kids' Choice Awards 2015" award were summed up, where the band won the category "Russian musical breakthrough of the year", and at the award "RU.TV 2015" in May, the team won the nomination "The Real Arrival". In addition, the group was nominated in the category "Breakthrough of the Year" for the "Muz-TV 2015". At the gala concert of the same prize, held June 7, the team, according to the version of the portal "Woman.ru", was recognized as "Favorite Artist of the Year". On June 8, the boy band won the "Discovery of the Year" nomination at the 6th annual "Fashion People Awards-2015" award ceremony.

May 29, 2015, the group on the air of the radio station "Love Radio" presented a new single "Look at me", and on June 23, 2015 on the air of the channel RU.TV the team presented its video for this song. It is noteworthy that Konstantin Meladze took part in the shooting of the video, playing the role of gardener in it, as well as singer Nyusha as the girl to whom the song was directed. In addition, on June 23, the iTunes Store released a gift album dedicated to the jubilee of Valery Meladze, in which the band presented the perpetual song "Sdelai eto pryam seichas". October 10, 2015 the band gave their first solo concert at the Moscow club Bud Arena, which was broadcast on the channel STS Love on December 31, 2015. November 12, 2015, it became known that Vladislav Ramm was suspended from work and left the group.

In April 2016, the single "Fix Everything" was released, which became the official soundtrack to the film of the same name with the members of the boy band in the lead roles. On May 31, 2016, the socially-musical video project "Raise Your Eyes", created by MBAND group members specially for the Children's Day, was attended by children from orphanages. In June 2016, MBAND, together with Nyusha, starred in a 360 ° panoramic video clip "Poprobuy ... Pochustvuy", created specifically for advertising Coca-Cola. The song from the clip is a Russian version of the Coca-Cola anthem "Taste the Feeling". And in July a new clip of the boy band, "Nevynosimaya", was released.

In 2016, the band released two albums: "Bez filtrov" and "Akustika".

In December 2016, the boy band presented a video for the song "The Ballerina", which was included in the soundtrack of the Russian dubbing of the French animated film Ballerina. The very same song was written back in 1995 and was originally performed by Valery Meladze.

In April 2017, the band recorded the song "Life is a cartoon", which was included in the soundtrack of the Russian dubbing of the Ukrainian animated film Nikita Kozhemyaka; and the main character of the cartoon in the Russian version was voiced by Nikita Kiosse. In May, the single "Pravilnaya devochka" was released, and in November - "Pomedlennee".

In March 2018, the single "Nitochka" was released.

On April 16 2020, Meladze Music officially announced MBAND's disbandment and the members were starting their individual careers as solo artists.
