= You are not my mate (song) =

"Ты не моя́ па́ра"

Single by Dima Bilan, Mari Kraimbrery
- Language: Russian
- English title: You Are Not My Mate
- Released: September 24, 2021
- Genre: Power pop; R&B
- Length: 2:43
- Label: Warner Music Russia, Velvet Music
- Producer: Alex Davia

"You are not my mate" (Russian: "Ты не моя́ па́ра") is a song by Russian singers Dima Bilan & Mari Kraimbrery, released on 24 September 2021 through the label Warner Music Russia.

== Background and release ==
The release of the song was first announced by Mari Kraimbrery in an interview with Лаурой Джугелией on the channel FAMETIVE TV on 15 September 2021.

== Critics ==
Artyom Kuchnikov, a reporter for ТНТ Music, in commenting on the single noted that the track represents a fight between exes.

== History of release ==
Region	Date	Format	Label
Worldwide	24 September 2021	Airplay; Digital distribution; streaming	Warner Music Russia, Velvet Music
