= Born to Trap =

Studio album by Kizaru
- Released: 13 November 2020
- Genre: Hip hop
- Length: 53:00
- Label: Haunted Family

Kizaru chronology
Karmageddon (2019)	Born to Trap (2020)	Bandana I (2021)

Born to Trap is the fifth studio album of Russian-Spanish hip hop singer Kizaru, consisting of 18 tracks. The album was released on 13 November 2020. Two singles from the album were released prior to the album ("Honey's Kettle" on 22 June 2020, "Narcos" on 31 July 2020). The album features three songs that have American hip-hop singers: HoodRich Pablo Juan, Smokepurpp and Tory Lanez.

== Track listing ==
Born to Trap track listing
No.	Title	Length
1.	"Intro"	1:53
2.	"Что за бизнес сука?"	3:25
3.	"Block Baby"	3:29
4.	"G Shit"	3:21
5.	"Plug"	3:26
6.	"Изи арифметика"	2:31
7.	"Bad Blood" (with Tory Lanez)	3:11
8.	"Газ в пол"	2:23
9.	"Ice Cream"	2:58
10.	"Whistle Song"	2:25
11.	"Trapazoid"	2:54
12.	"You and Me" (with Smokepurpp)	3:01
13.	"Oh Whou"	2:55
14.	"Wassup Homie"	3:51
15.	"Honey's Kettle" (with Hoodrich Pablo Juan)	2:48
16.	"Mr. Slime"	2:53
17.	"Keep Straight"	2:55
18.	"Narcos"	2:50
