= Na Beregu Neba =

Studio album by Dima Bilan
- Released: 21 July 2004
- Recorded: 2004
- Genres: Pop, R&B, dance-pop, pop rock
- Label: Gala Records
- Producer: Yuri Aizenshpis

Dima Bilan chronology
Ya Nochnoy Huligan (2003)	Na Beregu Neba (2004)	Vremya reka (2006)

Na Beregu Neba (Russian: На Берегу Неба) is an album by Dima Bilan released in 2004.

== Track listing ==
1. Ты Должна Рядом Быть (English: You Must Be Close To Me)
2. Мулатка (English: Mulatto Girl)
3. На Берегу Неба (English: At The Sky's Shore)
4. Милая (English: My honey)
5. Листья Праздничных Клёнов (English: Leaves Of Festive Maples)
6. Только Ты Не Плачь (English: Only Do Not Cry)
7. Как Ромео (English: As Romeo)
8. Невеста (English: Bride)
9. Всё Равно Найду (English: I Will Find Anyhow)
10. Ночь Без Тебя (English: Night Without You)
11. В Западне (English: In The Trap)
12. Вода, Песок (English: Water, Sand)
13. Петербуржская Весна (English: Petersburg Spring)
14. Поздрaвляю! (English: Congratulations!)
15. Как Хотел Я (English: How I Wanted)

In 2005, the reissue of the album came out, which included English versions of 3 songs. From the English version of the song "Ты Должна Рядом Быть" Dima took part in the national preselection for the Eurovision Song Contest in 2005, where he took 2nd place.

Bonus on Special Edition

1. Between The Sky And Heaven
2. Not That Simple
3. Take Me With You
