= Mechtatel =

Studio album by Dima Bilan
- Released: May 25th, 2011
- Recorded: 2009–2011
- Genre: pop, r'n'b, dance-pop
- Language: Russian, English
- Label: Universal
- Producer: Jim Beanz; J. R. Rotem

Dima Bilan chronology
Believe (2009)	Mechtatel (2011)

Singles from Mechtatel
- 1. "Changes" Released: July, 2009; 2. "По парам" Released: December, 2009; 3. "Safety" Released: June 2010; 4. "Я просто люблю тебя" Released: October 2010; 5. "Мечтали" Released: March 2011; 6. "Он Хотел" Released: July 2011; 7. "Задыхаюсь" Released: September 2011; 8. "Слепая Любовь" Released: December 2011

Mechtatel (Russian: Мечтатель, English: Dreamer) is the sixth album by Russian singer-songwriter Dima Bilan. It was recorded in Russia and the United States in collaboration with Jim Beanz and J.R. Rotem. A bonus disc version was published with an attached DVD contains the official videos of five songs.

== Track listing ==
#	Title	Latin script	Translation	Length
1	«Мечтатели»	Mechtateli	Dreamers	3:48
2	«Changes»			3:42
3	«Задыхаюсь»	Zadyhayus	I'm suffocating	3:31
4	«Я просто люблю тебя»	Ya prosto lyublyu tebya	I just love you	4:21
5	«Rocket man»			3:34
6	«Он хотел»	On hotel	He wanted	3:21
7	«Safety»			3:34
8	«Я сильней»	Ya sil'ney	I'm stronger	3:49
9	«Лови мои цветные сны»	Lovi Moi Cvetnye Sny	Catch My Colorful Dreams	3:42
10	«По парам»	Po param	In pairs	3:42
11	«Пока!»	Poka	Goodbye	3:17
12	«Get outta my way»			3:39
13	«Звезда» (feat. Anya Belan)	Zvezda	Star	3:22
14	«Слепая любовь»	Slepaya Lubov'	Blind Love	3:40
15	«Я просто люблю тебя» (remix)	Ya prosto lyublyu tebya (remix)	I just love you (remix)	3:11
16	«Safety» (remix)			4:20

== DVD Track listing ==
#	Title
1	«Changes» video
2	«По парам» video
3	«Safety» video
4	«Я просто люблю тебя» video
5	«Мечтатели» video
