= Ya Nochnoy Huligan =

Я Ночной Хулиган

Studio album by Dima Bilan
- Released: 12 June 2003
- Recorded: 2003
- Genre: Pop, R&B, disco
- Language: Russian
- Label: Gala Records
- Producer: Yuri Aizenshpis

Dima Bilan chronology
Я Ночной Хулиган (2003)	Na Beregu Neba (2004)

Singles from Ya Nochnoy Huligan
- 1. "Ya Tak Lublu Tebya"; 2. "Ti, Tolko Ti"; 3. "Ya Nochnoy Huligan"

Ya Nochnoy Huligan (Russian: Я Ночной Хулиган, I am a Night Hooligan) is the first Russian album by Russian pop star Dima Bilan released on June 12, 2003. It was distributed by Gala Records and the First Musical Publishing House (Первое Музыкальное Издательство) in Russia. It was recorded in Star Studios and Paul Vorotnikov and Dmitry Lykov mixed the tracks.

== Track listing ==
#	Track title	Transliteration	Translation
1.	Я Ночной Хулиган	Ya Nochnoy Huligan	I am a Night Hooligan
2.	Звёздочка Моя Ясная	Zvyozdochka Moya Yasnaya	My Clear Star
3.	Малыш	Malish	Baby
4.	Я Так Люблю Тебя	Ya Tak Lyublyu Tebya	I Love You So Much
5.	SMS		
6.	Girlfriend		
7.	Я Ошибся, Я Попал	Ya Oshibsa, Ya Popal	I’ve Made Mistake, I’ve Swallowed The Bait
8.	Июньский Дождь	Iyunskiy Dozhd'	June Rain
9.	Дорогая	Dorogaya	Dear
10.	Бум!	Bum!	Boom!
11.	Полная Луна	Polnaya Luna	Full Moon
12.	Ты Была Всегда Такой	Ti Byla Vsegda Takoy	You Were Always Such A Sort Of Person
13.	Капелька Крови	Kapelka Krovi	Droplet Of Blood
14.	Я Жду Тебя	Ya Zhdu Tebya	I’m Waiting For You
15.	Ты, Только Ты	Ti, Tolko Ti	You, Only
16.	Я Так Люблю Тебя (Remix)	Ya Tak Lyublyu Tebya (Remix)	I Love You So Much (Remix)

== I am a Night Hooligan+ ==
In 2004, the reissue of the album came out including 19 songs, 15 of the original + four new tracks:

1. Бессердечная (Heartless)
2. В последний раз (The last time)
3. Остановите музыку (Stop the music)
4. Тёмная ночь (The Dark Night)
