= Vladislav Ramm =

Russian singer (born 1995)

- Born: Vladislav Alekseevich Ivanov; September 17, 1995 (age 30); Kemerovo, Russia
- Occupations: Singer, Actor
- Years active: 2014–present
- Musical career
- Genres: Pop
- Formerly of: MBAND

Vladislav Alekseevich Ramm (Russian: Владислав Алексеевич Рамм; born September 17, 1995) is a Russian singer and a former member of the boy group MBAND (2014–2015).

== Biography ==
=== Early life ===
Vladislav Alekseevich Ivanov was born on September 17, 1995, in the city of Kemerovo. His mother was an actress of a musical theatre. Vladislav studied piano and elementary music theory at a music school and later on started taking private singing lessons. There were also a couple of times where he tried to start out in local musical groups.

After finishing school he attended the Moscow Theatre School of Oleg Tabakov, which he left, during; his first year of studies.

=== "I want to Meladze" and MBAND ===
Vladislav Ramm's first performance on television took place on September 13, 2014 as part of the casting of the show "I Want to Meladze".

During the project, Vladislav got into the team of Timati, but as a result of castling he managed to be in Anna Sedakova's team, and finished the show as part of Sergey Lazarev's group.

November 22, 2014, Vladislav was named, the winner of the project and a member of the group MBAND, together with Anatoly Tsoi, Artyom Pindyura and Nikita Kiosse. The first single released by MBAND was "Ona vernyotsa" which topped, hit parades and radio charts of the CIS countries.

As part of the band, Vladislav became the laureate of many music awards and, prizes, including Nickelodeon Kids' Choice Awards, Fashion, People Awards and MTV Europe Music Award for Best Russian Act.

The actor made his cinematic debut by playing one, of the main roles, in the 2016 comedy film Fix Everything.

=== Solo career ===
On November 12, 2015, Vladislav Ramm announced; his decision to depart from MBAND and become an independent solo artist. In an interview with Muz-TV, the artist admitted that he plans to continue his musical career independently, without, a producer. According to the producer Konstantin Meladze, Vladislav was actually suspended due to his professional incompetence and that he is not allowed to start a solo career due to a contract he signed until the year 2021.

On December 25, 2016, the singer; presented his solo album "#Pervyi" at a closed presentation. On January 19, 2017, the pre-order of the album was announced and the song "Vliyanie" was released on iTunes and Google Play. On the first day, "Vliyanie" hit the iTunes top charts. On January 20, the official release of the album took place. On the first day of sales, the album led the top chart on iTunes, and a few, days later the top Google Play chart.

In April 2017, the song "Khvatit dukhu" was released which also featured Nikolai Baturin, and at the end of May a clip was produced by Alexei Golubev. From this moment, Vladislav began to cooperate with Yana Rudkovskaya. And on September 1, Vladislav together with Nikolai Baturin, presented the song "Ni ya, ni ty". On November 16, a clip for the song was released, again made by Alexei Golubev. In early December, Dima Bilan released the album "Egoist", which included the songs "Egoist" and "Dyshi" written by Vladislav.

On February 23, 2018, he released the album "Lu4she".

== Personal life ==
He was married to Veronika Generalova.

== Discography ==
=== MBAND singles ===
- 2014 — Ona vernyotsa
- 2015 — Dai mne
- 2015 — Posmotri na menya
- 2015 — Chego ty hochesh?
- 2015 — Telefon

=== Solo albums ===
- 2017 — #pervyi
- 2018 — Lu4she

=== Solo singles ===
- 2017 — Khvatit dukhu (featuring Kolyas)
- 2017 — Ni ya, ni ty (featuring Kolyas)

== Filmography ==
- 2016 - Fix Everything (ru)
