= Karmageddon (album) =

Studio album by Kizaru
- Released: August 19, 2019
- Genre: Hip Hop
- Languages: Russian, English

Karmageddon is the fourth studio album by Russian and Spanish hip-hop singer kizaru, released on 16 August 2019 through the labels Haunted Family and Sony. The first single from the album, "Money Long:, released on 6 May 2019 and reached third on the world chart on Genius. The album includes two tracks with American rappers Smokepurpp and Black Kray. The album was certified platinum two weeks after its release.

== List of tracks ==
No.	Title	Length
1.	"Дежавю"	2:53
2.	"Top Dog"	2:19
3.	"Водопад"	2:55
4.	"Держу район"	3:45
5.	"Все что угодно"	2:22
6.	"Money Long"	2:14
7.	"Deep End" (совместно со Smokepurpp)	4:32
8.	"Сим салабим"	3:28
9.	"Smooth Operator"	2:17
10.	"Психопат-лунатик"	2:56
11.	"Я сделал это"	3:01
12.	"Еще одна ночь"	2:53
13.	"Cinderella" (совместно с Black Kray)	3:38
14.	"На мне детка"	3:12
15.	"Исповедь"	3:16

== Certifications ==
Region	Certification
Russia	Platinum
