= Believe (Dima Bilan album) =

Studio album by Dima Bilan
- Released: 15 May 2009
- Length: 52:08
- Language: English
- Label: CD Land; Moon; Universal
- Producer: Ryan Tedder, Jim Beanz, Rudy Perez

Dima Bilan chronology
Protiv pravil (2008)	Believe (2009)	Mechtatel (2011)

Singles from Believe
- 1. "Number One Fan" Released: 2007; 2. "Believe" Released: 2008; 3. "Lonely" Released: 2009; 4. "Lady" Released: 2009

Believe is the fifth studio album and the first full-length English language album by Russian singer-songwriter Dima Bilan. Released on 15 May 2009, the album marked Bilan's primary attempt to break into the international music market following his victory at the Eurovision Song Contest 2008.

== Background and production ==
The album was recorded across several international studios, including locations in Los Angeles, Miami, and Philadelphia. Bilan collaborated with high-profile American producers to achieve a Western pop and R&B sound. Notable contributors include Ryan Tedder (of OneRepublic), who co-wrote "Amnesia", and Jim Beanz, who had previously worked with Timbaland and Nelly Furtado.

The title track, "Believe", won the Eurovision Song Contest 2008 held in Belgrade, Serbia. The performance notably featured Hungarian violinist Edvin Marton and Russian Olympic figure skater Evgeni Plushenko.

== Track listing ==
No.	Title	Length
1.	"Automatic Lady"	3:20
2.	"Don't Leave"	3:54
3.	"Amnesia" (written by Ryan Tedder and Jesse McCartney)	3:36
4.	"Number 1 Fan"	3:08
5.	"Believe"	3:54
6.	"Lonely"	3:30
7.	"Mistakes"	3:45
8.	"Lady"	3:41
9.	"Anythin 4 Love" (feat. D.O.E.)	3:32
10.	"Porque Aun Te Amo" (produced by Rudy Perez)	4:30
11.	"In Circles"	3:34
12.	"Take Me With You"	3:38
13.	"Lady Flame"	3:38
14.	"Between The Sky And Heaven"	3:45
15.	"Это Была Любовь" (Remix)	4:02
16.	"Lady" (Voguesound Remix)	4:21
17.	"Lady" (Opera Club Remix)	3:41

=== Limited edition bonus DVD ===
The limited edition release of the album included a DVD featuring music videos for the following tracks:

- "Number 1 Fan"
- "Believe"
- "Lonely"
- "Lady"
