= Mari Kraimbrery =

Ukrainian-Russian singer (born 1992)

Mari Kraimbrery Мари Краймбрери
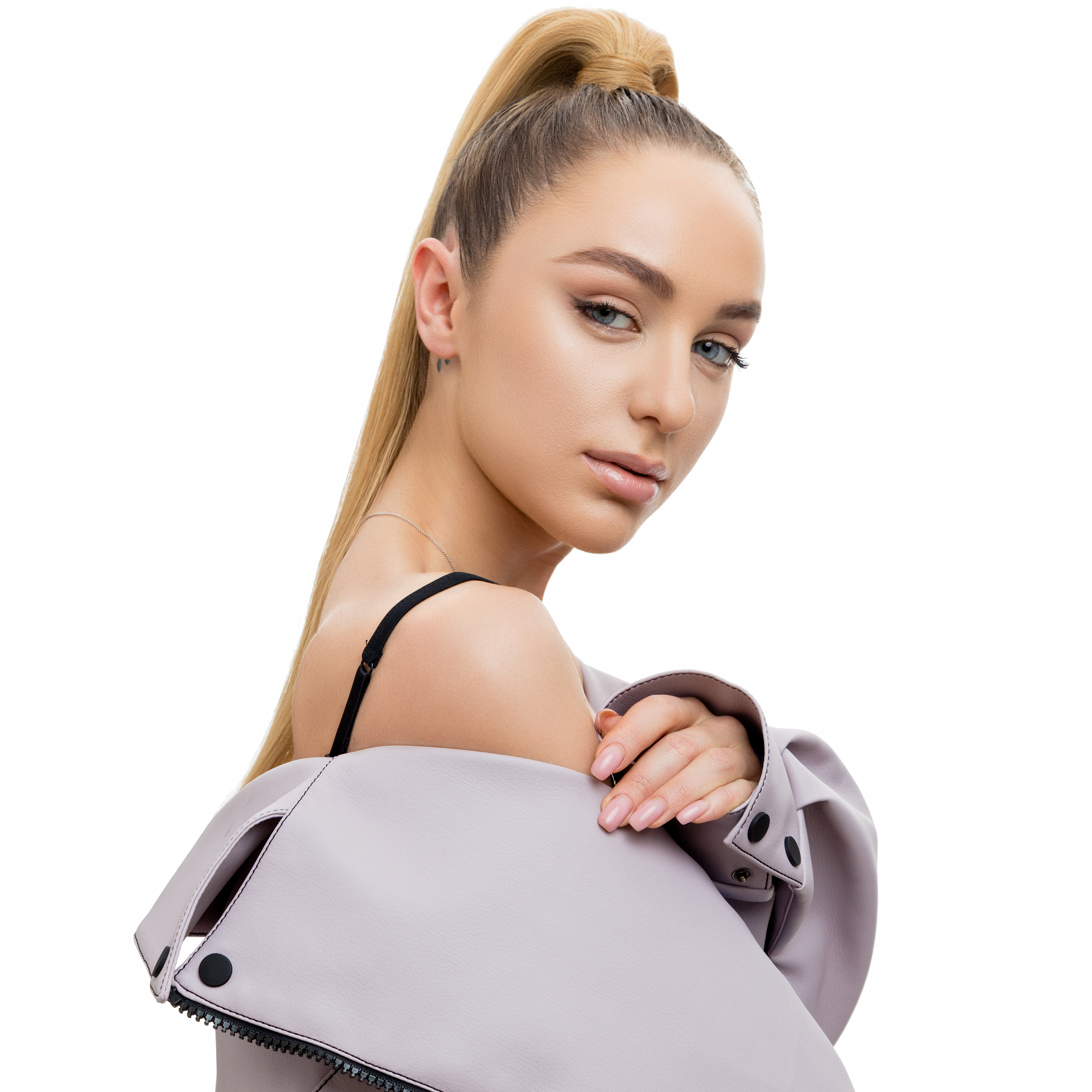
- Kraimbrery in 2021

Background information
- Born: Marina Vadimovna Zhadan; 21 August 1992 (age 34); Kryvyi Rih, Ukraine
- Origin: Moscow, Russia
- Genres: Russian pop; R&B
- Occupations: Singer; songwriter; record producer
- Years active: 2011–present
- Label: Velvet Music (2017–present)
- Website: kraimbrery.com/
- Mari Kraimbrery's voice (in Russian) Recorded February 2017

Marina Vadimovna Zhadan (Ukrainian: Марина Вадимівна Жадан; Russian: Марина Вадимовна Жадан; born 21 August 1992), known professionally as Mari Kraimbrery (Мари Краймбрери), is a Russian singer, songwriter, and record producer.

== Career ==
She garnered initial success after the release of the single "Smogu li ya bez tebya" on 16 July 2012, which was a great success on social networks.

Throughout her musical career, Kraimbrery has released four studio albums: NNKN, Pereobulas', Nas uznayet ves' mir (Part 1), and Nas uznayet ves' mir (Part 2). 77 singles were also released, two of which topped TopHit, charting for over 43 weeks.

She is a laureate and nominee of various music awards, including the Muz-TV, RU.TV and "ZD Awards" awards. Two-time winner of the Russian music award "Golden Gramophone Award" of the radio station "Russkoye Radio" (for the songs "Pryatalas' v vannoy" and "Okean").

== Discography ==
The main article in the Russian-language section of Wikipedia, see Mari Kraimbrery discography

=== Albums ===
- NNKN (2017)
- Pereobulas' (2018)
- Nas uznayet ves' mir (Part 1) (2021)
- Nas uznayet ves' mir (Part 2) (2022)

=== Singles ===
- Okean
- You are not my mate (feat. Dima Bilan)

== Awards and nominations ==
The main article in the Russian-language section of Wikipedia, see List of awards and nominations received by Mari Kraimbrery

Year	Award	Category	Work	Nominee	Result	Ref.
2018	OK! "More than stars"	New faces. Music	—	Mari Kraimbrery	Won	
2018	"ZD Awards"	Breakthrough of the Year	—	Mari Kraimbrery	Nominated	
2019	ZHARA Music Awards	Best Album	Pereobulas'	Mari Kraimbrery	Won	
2019	Muz-TV Awards	Breakthrough of the Year	—	Mari Kraimbrery	Nominated	
2020	"Golden Gramophone Award"	—	"Pryatalas' v vannoy"	Mari Kraimbrery	Won	
2021	ZHARA Music Awards	Female video	"Okean"	Mari Kraimbrery	Nominated	
2021	ZHARA Music Awards	Singer of the Year	—	Mari Kraimbrery	Nominated	
2021	ZHARA Music Awards	Collaboration of the Year	"Medlyak"	HammAli & Mari Kraimbrery	Nominated	
2021	Glamour Influencers Awards	#PROMUSIC	—	Mari Kraimbrery	Nominated	
2021	RU.TV Awards	Best Female Singer	—	Mari Kraimbrery	Nominated	
2021	Muz-TV Awards	Best Female Artist	—	Mari Kraimbrery	Nominated	
2021	"Golden Gramophone Award"	—	"Okean"	Mari Kraimbrery	Won	
2021	Prague Independent Film Festival	Best Music Video	"Pryatalas' v vannoy"	Mari Kraimbrery	Won	
