= Bandana I =

2021 album by Big Baby Tape & Kizaru

Studio album by Big Baby Tape and Kizaru
- Released: 22 October 2021
- Genre: Hip hop
- Length: 36:06
- Languages: Russian, English
- Label: Sony
- Producers: Big Baby Tape, Call Me G, Culoso Beats, Deyjan Beats, Evince Beats, Flory, JunioR Beats, Montana, Soulm8, Vickyferribeats, Waves B & YG Woods

Kizaru chronology
Born to Trap (2020)	Bandana I (2021)	First Day Out (2022)

Bandana I (or simply Bandana) is a collaborative studio album by Russian rappers Big Baby Tape & Kizaru. It was released on 22 October 2021 through the label Sony Music Russia.

== History ==
Big Baby Tape flew to Kizaru to Barcelona in mid June 2021. They built a home studio there, where they recorded the album.

The release name was announced on 17 July 2021 in the video of the same on the YouTube-channel of the creative association Haunted Family.

== Listens ==
The album garnered a million listens on the service VK in 15 minutes & three million listens an hour after the release. A day later, the number of listens increased to 18 million, but did not break the record of 21 million listens set by Russian rapper Morgenshtern with his album Million Dollar: Happiness.

=== Reception ===
Meduza praised the album, noting it followed a "nostalgic" trend in Russian hip-hop, offering throwbacks to 1990s rap stars such as Three 6 Mafia and Snoop Dogg. The album was named by The Flow as the #4 album of 2021 in their top-50 list.

== Track listing ==
All lyrics are written by Egor Rakitin (Big Baby Tape) & Oleg Nechiporenko (Kizaru).

No.	Title	Length
1.	"99 Problems"	2:39
2.	"So Icy Nihao"	2:33
3.	"Big Tymers"	3:11
4.	"Dirrt"	2:41
5.	"Ladidadida"	2:00
6.	"Million"	2:14
7.	"5 Nights Crazy"	2:19
8.	"Errbody Sleeping"	2:43
9.	"Mama Makusa"	2:52
10.	"Bandana"	2:31
11.	"Slip & Slide"	1:54
12.	"Andrew Story"	3:12
13.	"Bon Voyage"	2:14
14.	"Ride Or Die"	3:03
Total length:		36:00

== Personnel ==
This list of recording members is taken from Genius.

Producers

- Big Baby Tape (tracks 1, 2, 4, 6, 11 & 12)
- Waves B (track 2)
- Culoso Beats (tracks 3 & 5)
- Flory (tracks 3 & 5)
- Vickyferribeats (track 6)
- Soulm8 (track 6)
- Deyjan Beats (track 7)
- YG Woods (track 9)
- Montana (track 10)
- Evince Beats (track 13)
- Call Me G (track 13)
- JunioR Beats (track 14)
