= Igor Morozov (baritone) =

Russian-Ukrainian opera singer (born 1948)

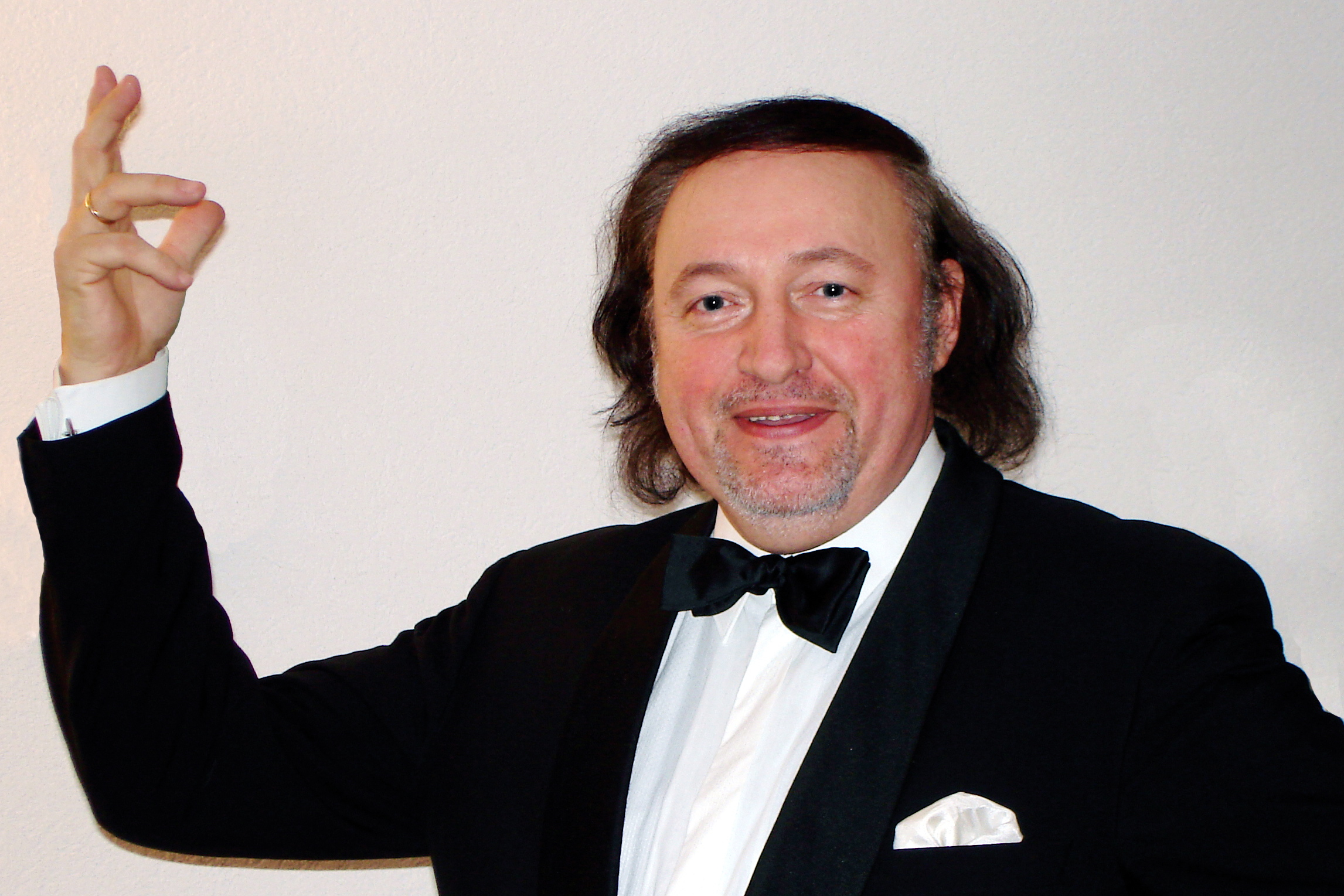
Igor Morozov

Igor Morozov (born 1948) is a Russian-Ukrainian opera singer (baritone) (in Russian: Игорь Анатолевич Морозов)

Igor Morozov was born in Dnipropetrovsk in Ukraine and started singing while still a child with professional orchestras. These concerts were broadcast by radio across the Soviet Union. At the age of 16, he left his hometown to study at the Tchaikovsky Conservatory in Moscow. There, his first teacher was the bass Mark Reizen, and his second the Georgian baritone and People's Artist of the Georgian SSR, David Gamrekeli. Immediately after having finished his studies, young Morozov received a contract as a leading baritone to the Kirov Opera (today's Mariinsky Theatre) and changed two years later to the leading opera house of the Soviet Union: the Bolshoi Theatre in Moscow. Here he sang the great parts of Russian and Italian repertoire such as the title role in Eugene Onegin, Lionel in The Maid of Orleans (with Makvala Kasrashvili in the title role), Yeletzki in The Queen of Spades, Robert in Iolanta all by Tchaikovsky, Rimsky-Korsakov's Misghir in The Snow Maiden (also recorded as CD), Andrey Bolkonsky in Prokofiev's War and Peace, Conte di Luna in Il trovatore, Gérmont in La traviata, Rodrigo in Don Carlo all by Verdi, Sharpless in Puccini's Madama Butterfly and Silvio in Leoncavallos Pagliacci (on DVD with Galina Kalinina and Vladimir Atlantov). Morozov also sang many rare and new operas, e.g. the part of Chichikov in Rodion Shchedrin's 1976 opera Dead Souls. Morozov used to be a frequent partner in concerts of the soprano Elena Obraztsova on TV.

In 1991 Igor Morozov was awarded by Boris Yeltsin with the highest title for artists in Russia, the title "Narodni Artist Rossii" (People's Artist of the USSR).

Since his very successful debut as Onegin at the Wiener Staatsoper, Igor Morozov has also been singing in many famous opera houses and festivals in Western Europe and the United States: Teatro alla Scala in Milan, Deutsche Oper Berlin and Staatsoper Unter den Linden Berlin, Staatsoper Hamburg, Cologne, Bayerische Staatsoper Munich, Amsterdam, Copenhagen, Opernhaus Zürich, Teatro Massimo Palermo, Bregenzer Festspiele, Salzburger Festspiele, Boston Music Festival, Houston Grand Opera with conductors such as Lorin Maazel, Anton Guadagno, Carlo Franci, Pinchas Steinberg and partners like Edita Gruberova, Vesselina Kasarova, Francisco Araiza, Giuseppe Giacomini, Nicolai Ghiaurov, Matti Salminen the leading roles in operas like Mazeppa (Tchaikovsky), Rigoletto, Nabucco, Simon Boccanegra all by Verdi, Kovaliov in Shostakovich's The Nose. He has become a well known singer for different works of Shostakovich (Thirteenth Symphony, Babi Yar, Michelangelo Suite, Lady Macbeth of the Mtsensk District).

In Germany, Austria and Switzerland his name is usually spelled "Igor Morosow".

Woody Allen chose his interpretation of "Iago's Dream" from Verdi's Otello for his 2005 film Match Point.

Morozov is also very busy singing works by composers from Russia and Ukraine that are little known outside their home country: Georgy Sviridov (among others: "My father is a farmer" recorded with the composer as pianist), Anton Rubinstein, Mykola Lysenko, Arthur Lourié, Semyon Gulak-Artemovsky.
