= Zvonko Digital =

Russian concern and music distributor

National Digital Aggregator LLC
- Trade name: ZVONKO digital
- Native name: ООО «Национальный цифровой агрегатор»
- Company type: Limited liability company
- Industry: entertainment music and video
- Founded: 2015; 11 years ago
- Founder: Aleksey Karelov; Aleksandr Sukhotin
- Headquarters: Moscow, Russia
- Area served: Worldwide
- Key people: Aleksey Luinov (CEO) Dmitry Konnov (Zvonko Group administrator)
- Brands: Velvet Music, Melodiya
- Services: music and video distribution, promotion and advertising
- Number of employees: 47 (2022)
- Parent: Prime Time AV Lab LTD. GMT Partners LTD.
- Website: https://zvonkodigital.ru/en

Zvonko Digital (stylised as ZVONKO digital, legally and previously known as National Digital Aggregator LLC, NDA) is a Russian concern and music distributor. Zvonko is a "preferred distributor/partner" for Spotify, Apple Music and YouTube.

Zvonko has its own publishing company in the United States, Iricom US Ltd., for managing rights in North America.

== History ==
NDA was founded in 2015 and started providing distribution services under this name. In the same year became distributor of Russian record labels, such as Velvet Music, Melodiya, Gamma Music and First Music Publishing (1MP).

With 1MP, NDA started the first national content registry in Russia.

As provided by SPARK-Interfax, NDA's revenue in 2019 is 448 million rubles, net profit — 13 million rubles.

In 2020, Russian Author's Society got about 40% of rights on NDA's releases from Prime Time AV Lab LTD, who are eventually got left with 30% of rights. Sergei Babich, founder of music conference Colisium, said this:

This, of course, happens in the interests of songwriters, who are signed on RAS, which thus increases its influence in the market.

As provided by List-Org, NDA's revenue in 2020 is 820 million rubles, net profit — 117 million rubles.

On the launch of YouTube Shorts in Russia NDA partnered with YouTube and provided its catalog for the platform, and also partnered with TikTok after their announcement of monetization of music on the platform.

In 2021 NDA stated, that they are going to create a concern with their labels: 1MP, Soyuz Studio, Effective Records and Soyuz Music, and also with indiependent Emirati distributor FreshTunes, named Zvonko Group. Analytics stated, that about 20% of releases on Russian market are distributed by Zvonko. The administrator of Zvonko Group will be Dmitry Konnov.

In 2022, NDA started providing its services as ZVONKO digital.
