= Dima Bilan =

Russian singer and model (born 1981)

Dima Bilan Дима Билан
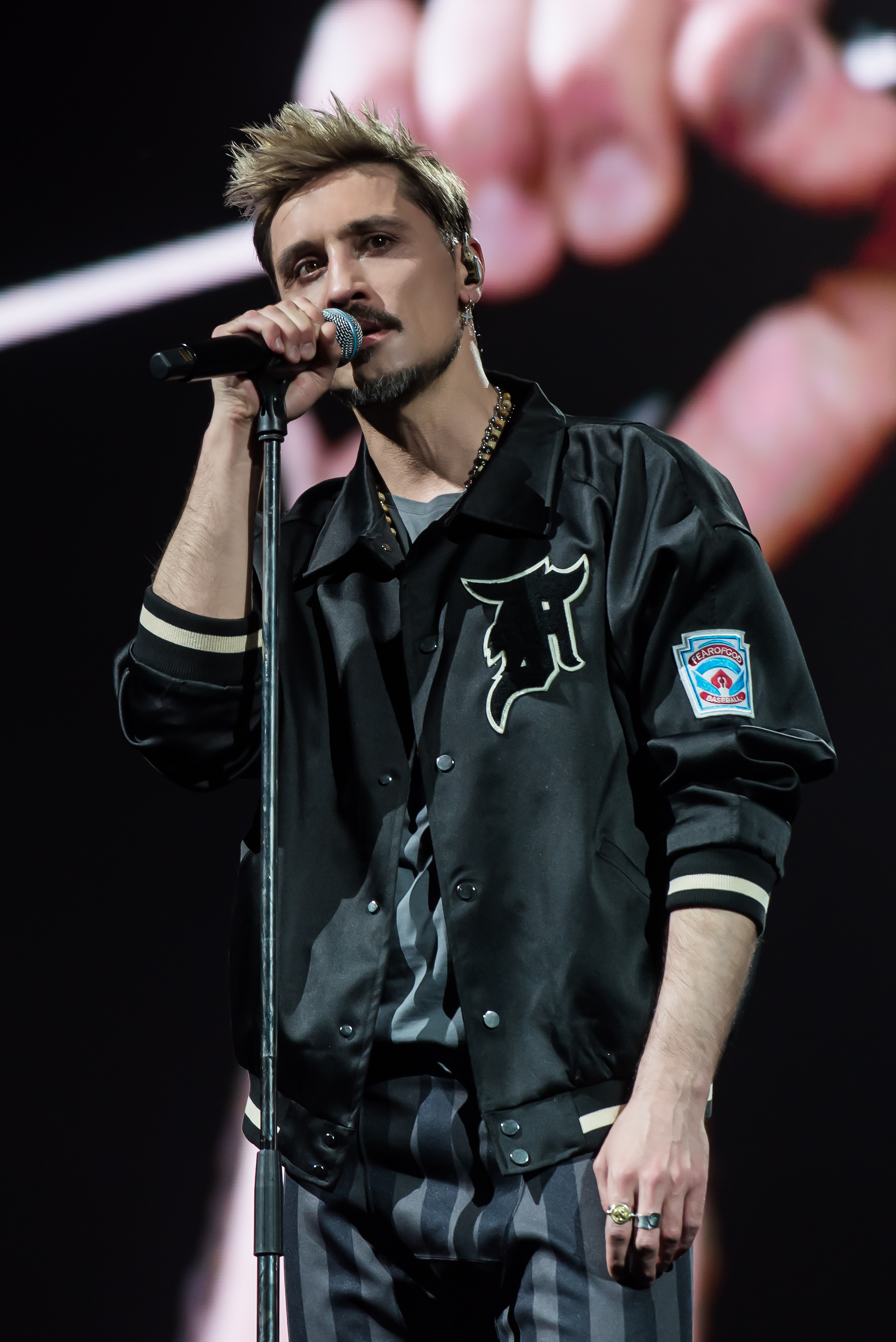
- Bilan in 2022

Background information
- Born: Viktor Nikolayevich Belan; 24 December 1981 (age 44); Ust-Dzheguta, Karachay-Cherkess AO, Russian SFSR, USSR
- Origin: Maysky, Kabardino-Balkaria, Russia
- Genres: Pop; R&B; soul
- Occupation: Singer
- Years active: 2000–present
- Labels: Universal; Gala Records; EMI; Misteriya Zvuka; Archer Music Production; Warner Music Russia
- Website: bilan.ru

Dima Nikolayevich Bilan (Russian: Ди́ма Никола́евич Била́н, IPA: [ˈdʲimə nʲɪkɐˈlajɪvʲɪdʑ bʲɪˈlan]; born Viktor Nikolayevich Belan [Russian: Ви́ктор Никола́евич Бела́н] on 24 December 1981) is a Russian singer. In 2002, Bilan participated in the first edition of New Wave. At the end of the contest, he finished in fourth place. He represented Russia at the Eurovision Song Contest 2006 with "Never Let You Go", finishing second, and he won the contest in 2008 in Belgrade, with the song "Believe".

== Early life ==
Dima Bilan was born as Viktor Belan in Ust-Dzheguta in the autonomous republic Karachay-Cherkessia in a mixed family of Tatar, Karachay and Russian heritage. Bilan's father, Nikolai Mikhailovich Belan, was born in Kabardino-Balkaria and his mother, Nina Dmitriyevna Belan, in Tatarstan. He has an elder sister, Yelena, and a younger sister, Anna. After having briefly lived in Tatarstan as a child, Bilan's family relocated to Maysky in Kabardino-Balkaria.

Bilan started playing bayan in the fifth class of school and participated in different music contests as a child. He became interested in music as he enjoyed singing during school and started to write letters to the Gnessin Musical College, asking them for entrance requirements. Although the musical college did not respond to his writings, he still went to the auditions and managed to enroll. Between 2000 and 2003, he specialised in classical singing. Afterwards, he enrolled at the Russian Institute of Theatre Arts, where he studied acting. At the time, Bilan lived at an apartment of an acquainted family. He financed his studies while working as a nighttime stock clerk in a shoe store.

== Career ==
=== 1998–2004: Early career, New Wave and first albums ===
"1998 came about (...) I already studied in the eleventh grade, but I had not graduated yet. During the Winter, I travelled to Moscow and I wrote in my diary [the lyrics of Meladze's "Vera"]: 'To the north, to the north, goes the train from nowhere to Moscow. The conductor sleeps, the drunken neighbours sleep.'. It was true that my neighbours were drunk, it was a couchette car. I was writing and writing and thought: this is exactly how my life is going now. I wrote five pages about it. It helped me a lot back then."

— Dima Bilan

Bilan started his music career during school. He regularly performed at school parties and for guests at home. He idolised Valeriy and Konstantin Meladze in his teen years. In 1995, he first performed at a televised music contest, singing Valeriy Meladze's "Aktrisa". Meladze's 1997 single "Vera" especially became important to Bilan.

In 1998, he first travelled to Moscow to participate in a children's music contest. He received a diploma from Iosif Kobzon, who was the chairman of the jury. After moving to Moscow to studying at Gnessin, Bilan started recording his first songs. His first music video "Osen'" was released in late 2000. He performed his first music video under the pseudonym Dima Belan.

Although Bilan studied to become an opera singer, he quickly found himself bored with is coursework and dreamt of becoming a pop singer. Via a classmate, he met Yuri Aizenshpis, who saw potential in Bilan. Bilan then officially started performing under the pseudonym "Dima Bilan", taking both the first name and surname of his grandfather.

In August 2002, Bilan participated in the first edition of New Wave. At the end of the contest, he finished in fourth place.

After New Wave, Bilan released a music video for "Boom". In 2003, Bilan released his debut album Ya nochnoy huligan, which became popular in Russia and was received well among critics. As a result, he performed its eponymous single "Ya nochnoy huligan" at the 2003 edition of Pesnya goda. However, Bilan's big break came with the release of the ballad "Na beregu neba", which peaked at #2 at the TopHit radio charts. The subsequent album Na beregu neba became one of the best-selling albums in Russia of 2004, receiving a gold certification.

=== 2005–2008: Eurovision participations, "Believe" and brief international breakthrough ===
Enjoying large success in his native Russia, Bilan was signed up by his producer Aizenshpis to compete at Russia's Eurovision Song Contest 2005's national selection. With the English-language track "Not That Simple", Bilan was the favourite to win the selection. However, he eventually finished second behind Natalia Podolskaya despite being on top of the televoting for most of the final. The Russian version of the song, titled "Ty dolzhna ryadom byt'" became the 21st most-played track on Russian radio in 2005.

In mid-March 2006, Bilan was chosen internally by Russian broadcaster Channel One to represent Russia at the Eurovision Song Contest in Athens, Greece. Out of 37 participating countries, Bilan took second place with the dark pop song "Never Let You Go", equalling one of Russia's best ever showing at Eurovision — Alsou's "Solo" was runner-up back in the 2000 contest. Also in 2007 he premiered the first single from his new album — Number One Fan. According to Russian and Eastern European radio airplay chart, Number One Fan topped the charts for eight weeks. Video for this song was shot in London by famous British director Trudy Bellinger.

On 4 October, Bilan premiered his second single from the forthcoming album, Amnesia, at the MTV Russia Music Awards 2007. During this show, Bilan won three awards, for Best Performer, Best Song and — for the third consecutive year — Best Artist.

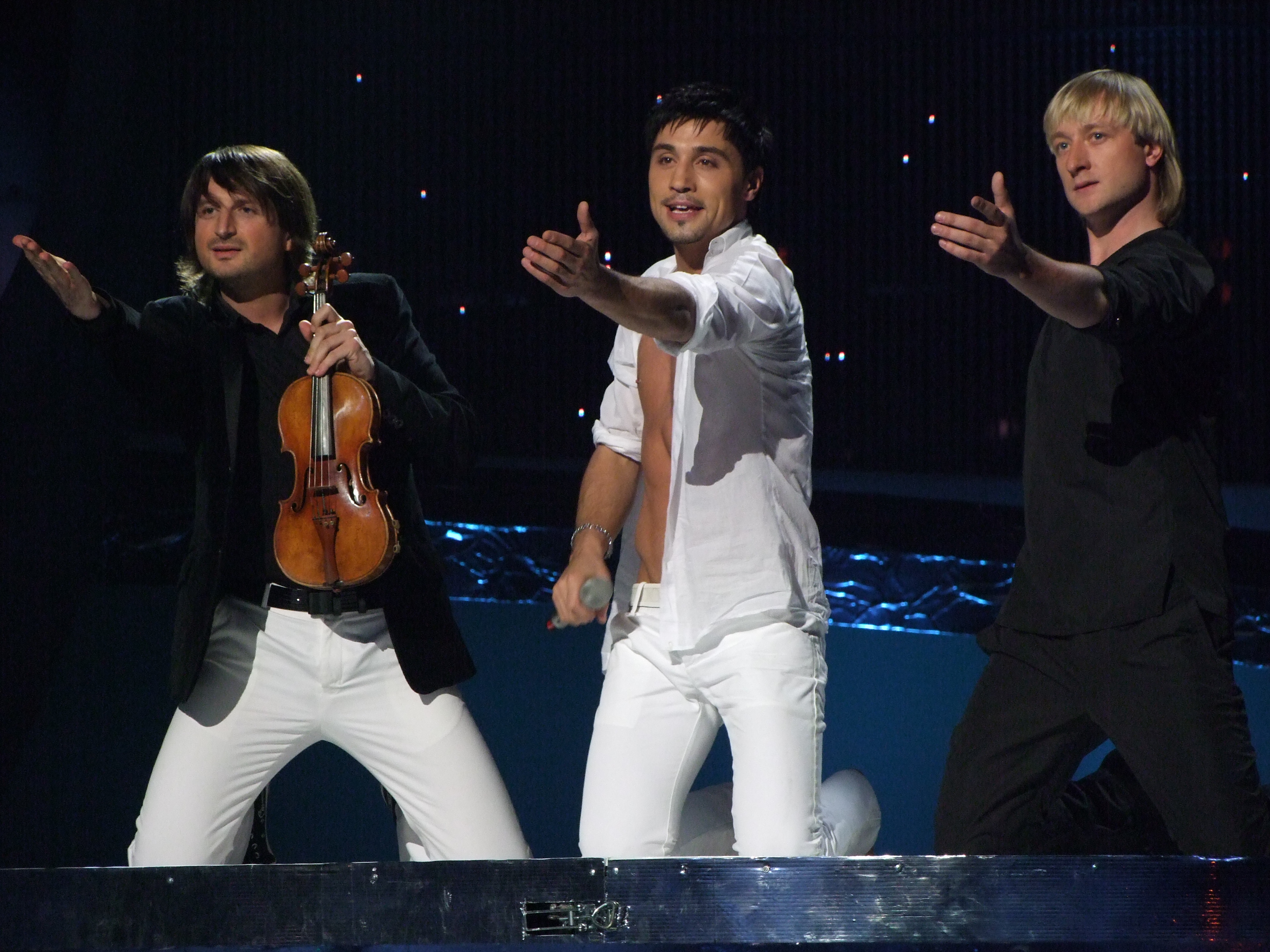
Bilan performing at the Eurovision Song Contest final in Belgrade, 2008. He is accompanied by Edvin Marton (left) and Evgeni Plushenko (right).

In 2008, Bilan released three albums — in Russian, English and Spanish. He also released an English album in 81 countries in co-operation with Interscope Records (Universal Group). He worked on his English album, with some tracks produced by Jim Beanz and Ryan Tedder (OneRepublic).

On 20 February, Bilan went to Miami and recorded a few tracks for his Spanish album with famous producer Rudy Perez. The Spanish album will include a duet with Nelly Furtado and a Spanish version of his first international single "Number One Fan."

In 2008, Bilan once again represented Russia in the Eurovision Song Contest in Belgrade with the song "Believe", accompanied by Hungarian violinist Edvin Marton and Russian olympic and three-time world champion figure skater Evgeni Plushenko. On 24 May 2008, Bilan won first place in the contest, receiving 272 points and seven twelves. His victory's integrity was questioned by Ukraine's officials later in May. The following years, the trio performed at various ice shows, among them the inaugural 2010 edition of the Fantasy on Ice show in Fukui.

=== 2009–2010 ===
During 2009 Bilan has continued with concerts and he also performed during the Eurovision Song Contest 2009, before handing over the title of Eurovision Song Contest winner to Alexander Rybak of Norway.

In 2010 Dima recorded a demo version of the song "White Nights", which would be competing in the Eurovision Song Contest 2010, but he did not enter the contest saying that it would be too soon to return to the contest after just 2 years after his win at the Eurovision Song Contest 2008.

In the Summer of 2010, Bilan produced and starred in the short film Театр Абсурда (Theatre of the Absurd, written and directed by Maxim Apriatin and based upon Bilan's song Он хотел (He Wanted To). In the film, Bilan performs monologues in which he shares his opinion on the moral values of the people who live in the Russian capital, as well as quotations from Ecclesiastes, and scraps of the diary of Jim Morrison. The film was released on the Internet in late 2010.

=== 2012–present ===
Bilan has recently competed at Russia's Eurovision 2012 song selection for the Eurovision Song Contest 2012 in Baku, Azerbaijan. He entered the competition with t.A.T.u. member Yulia Volkova with their song "Back To Her Future". They finished in 2nd place with 29.25 points from the winning entry, "Party for Everybody" by Russian ethno-pop band Buranovskiye Babushki who was 38.51 points ahead of them.

In January 2023, Ukraine imposed sanctions on Dima for his support of the 2022 Russian invasion of Ukraine. In February 2023 Canada sanctioned Dima Bilan.

He attended the Almost Naked Party held in a Moscow nightclub in December 2023.

On 12 June 2025, it was announced that he had become one of the official ambassadors of Intervision 2025.

== Awards ==
Dima Bilan is winner of 37 awards to date:

=== Honor Awards ===
- 2006 - Honoured Artist of Kabardino-Balkaria
- 2007 - Honored Artist of Chechnya
- 2007 - Honoured Artist of Ingushetia
- 2008 - People's Artist of Kabardino-Balkaria
- 2018 - Merited Artist of the Russian Federation

=== MTV Russia Music Awards ===
Dima Bilan record for most awards RMA - 10.

- 2005 - "Best Performer" and "Best Artist"
- 2006 - "Best Song" ( "Never Let You Go" ), "The Best Artist"
- 2007 - "Best Song", "Best Song" ("Невозможное возможно"), "Best Artist"
- 2008 - "Best Video", "Best Singer", "The Pop Project"

=== MTV Europe Music Awards ===
- 2005 - "Best Russian Act"
- 2006 - "Best Russian Act"
- 2007 - "Best Russian Act"
- 2008 - "Best Russian Act" entered into the category "Top5 Favorit Europe"
- 2009 - "Best Russian Act" hit the Top5 "Best European Act"
- 2010 - "Best Russian Act" hit the Top5 "Best European Act"
- 2012 - "Best Russian Act" and "Best European Act" hit the Top5 "Best Worldwide Act"

=== Muz-TV Award ===
- 2007 - "Song of the Year", "Album of the Year", "Best Performer".
- 2008 - "Best Ringtone", "Best Performer".
- 2009 - "Best Video", "Best Song".
- 2010 - "Best Performer".
- 2011 - "Best Performer".
- 2012 - "Best Performer".

=== Golden Gramophone Award ===
Dima Bilan has repeatedly been awarded the Golden Gramophone Award.

- 2005 - for the song "На берегу неба"
- 2006 год — "Так устроен этот мир"
- 2007 год — "Невозможное возможно"
- 2008 год — "Все в твоих руках"

=== ZD Awards ===
Bilan repeatedly became the laureate of "Soundtrack" in various categories:

- 2003 - Sexiest Artist
- 2004 - "Singer of the Year"
- 2007 - Soloist of the Year and Album of the Year (for the album "Время река")
- 2008 - "Soloist of the Year"
- 2009 - Singer of the Year and Album of the Year (for the album Believe)

=== Eurovision Song Contest ===
- 2006 - 2nd place Eurovision (Athens)
- 2008 - 1st place Eurovision (Belgrade)

Dima Bilan is the first artist representing Russia to win Eurovision Song Contest

=== Russian National Music Awards ===
- 2015 - "Best Electronic Project of the Year" for "Alien24" (by Dima Bilan feat. Andrej Cherny)
- 2015 - "Best Concert of the Year" for "33"
- 2016 - "Best Male Pop Singer of the Year"

=== Glamour Magazine Awards ===
- 2006 - Man of the year
- 2009 - Man of the year

Awards
World Music Awards
Preceded by 2005 Philipp Kirkorov	Best-Selling Russian Artist; 2006; Dima Bilan	Succeeded by 2007 Serebro

== Discography ==
=== Studio albums ===
- 2003: Ya Nochnoy Huligan (I'm a Night Hooligan)
- 2004: Na Beregu Neba (On the shore of the sky)
- 2006: Vremya reka (Time is a River)
- 2008: Protiv pravil (Against the Rules)
- 2009: Believe
- 2011: Mechtatel (Dreamer)
- 2013: Dotyanis (Reach)
- 2015: Ne molchi (Don't Be Silent)
- 2017: Egoist
- 2020: Perezagruzka (Reboot)
- 2020: Вторая жизнь (Second Life)
- 2025: Vector V

=== Compilation albums ===
- 2011: BEST. Ot Hooligana do Mechtatelya (BEST. From Hooligan to Dreamer)
- 2021: 13 druzej Bilana (13 Friends of Bilan) (Warner Music Russia, tribute album)

=== Singles ===
- 2003 — Ты, только ты (You, only you)
- 2004 — Ты должна рядом быть (You must be near)
- 2004 — Not That Simple (English version of "Ты должна рядом быть")
- 2006 — Я тебя помню (I remember you)
- 2006 — Never Let You Go (English version of "Так устроен этот мир")
- 2006 — Это была любовь (It was love)
- 2008 — Believe (English version of "Всё в твоих руках")
- 2008 — Lonely (English version of "Тоска")
- 2009 — Dancing Lady (English version of "Со мною")
- 2009 — Lady
- 2009 — Это модно (It's Fashion)
- 2009 — Changes (English version of "Больно")
- 2010 — По парам (On the pairs)
- 2010 — Safety (ft. Anastacia)
- 2010 — Я просто люблю тебя (I just love you)
- 2011 — Мечтатели (Dreamers)
- 2011 — Задыхаюсь (I'm suffocating)
- 2013 — Обними меня (Hug me)
- 2016 — Неделимые (Inseparable)
- 2017 — Прости меня (Forgive me) (with Sergey Lazarev)
- 2017 — Держи (Hold)
- 2018 – Пьяная любовь (Drunk love)
- 2018 – Молния (Lightning)
- 2019 – BilanPholiya (with Polina Gagarina)
- 2019 – Океан (Ocean)
- 2019 – Про белые розы (About white roses)
- 2019 – Полуночное такси (Midnight taxi)
- 2020 – Химия (Chemistry)
- 2020 – Вторая жизнь (Second life)
- 2020 – Dreams
- 2021 — Ради побед (For the sake of victories)
- 2021 — Это была любовь (It was love) (with Zivert)
- 2021 — Ты не моя пара (with Mari Kraimbrery)
- 2021 — Держи (Keep) (with Klava Koka)
- 2021 — Believe (with JONY)

== Filmography ==
Dima Bilan starred in several Russian films and serials:

- 2005 - Not Born Beautiful (cameo)
- 2006 - Club (cameo)
- 2006 - The Adventures of Pinocchio (Duremar)
- 2007 - Star break (Fortiano)
- 2007 - Kingdom of Crooked Mirrors (Gurd)
- 2008 - Goldfish
- 2009 - Pinocchio (visiting singer)
- 2011 - Theatre of the Absurd
- 2013 - Frozen (Russian dub, voice of Hans)
- 2014 - Space Pirate Captain Harlock live-action (Harlock in youth)
- 2016 - The Heritage of Love live-action (His first role in full-length film)

Awards and achievements
Preceded by (Serbia) Marija Šerifović with "Molitva"	Winner of the Eurovision Song Contest; 2008	Succeeded by (Norway) Alexander Rybak with "Fairytale"
Preceded by Natalia Podolskaya with "Nobody Hurt No One"	Russia in the Eurovision Song Contest; 2006	Succeeded by Serebro with "Song #1"
Preceded by Serebro with "Song #1"	Russia in the Eurovision Song Contest; 2008	Succeeded by Anastasia Prikhodko with "Mamo"
Preceded by (Germany) Lena	Best European Act in the MTV Europe Music Awards; 2012	Succeeded by Incumbent
