= Victor Zinchuk =

Russian composer

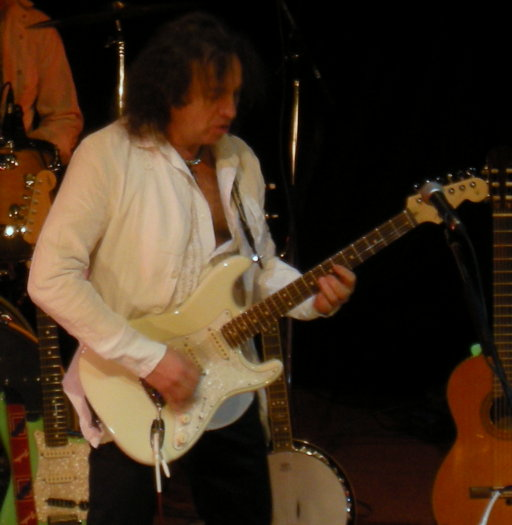
Victor Zinchuk in 2010

Victor Ivanovich Zinchuk (Russian: Виктор Иванович Зинчук; born April 8, 1958, in Moscow) is a Russian guitar virtuoso, composer, arranger, Honored Artist of Russia in 2005. Golden Guitar of Russia.
