= Stas Mikhaylov =

Russian singer (born 1969)

Stas Mikhaylov Стас Михайлов
- Mikhaylov in 2024

Background information
- Born: Stanislav Vladimirovich Mikhaylov; 27 April 1969 (age 57); Sochi, Soviet Union
- Genres: russian chanson, pop
- Occupation: Singer
- Years active: 1991–present

Stanislav Vladimirovich Mikhaylov (Russian: Станислав Владимирович Михайлов), better known as Stas Mikhaylov (Russian: Стас Михайлов; born 27 April 1969) is a popular Russian singer and songwriter, People's Artist of Russia (2022); laureate of the Russian National Music Award and the Golden Gramophone Award. Stas Mikhaylov reported the highest income of all singers in Russia in 2011 with $20 million and 2012 with $21 million

Mikhaylov is best known for his songs Dlya tebya (lit. For you) and Nu vot i vsyo. The first of those became the best-known among the releases of singer.

== Biography ==
Stas Mikhaylov was born in Sochi. His father, Vladimir Mikhaylov, was a pilot from Shamakhi, Azerbaijan, while Stas Mikhaylov's paternal great-grandmother is buried in Sumgayit.

== Pesnya goda ==
Year	Final	Title in English
2009	Между небом и землёй	Between heaven and earth
2010	Отпусти, Королева вдохновения	Release, Inspiration Queen
2011	Только ты	Only you
2012	Джокер	Joker
2013	Озноб души, Спящая красавица	Chills soul, Sleeping Beauty
2014	Под прицелом объективов	Under the eye lens
2015	Понимаю, ты устала	I understand, you're tired

== Albums ==
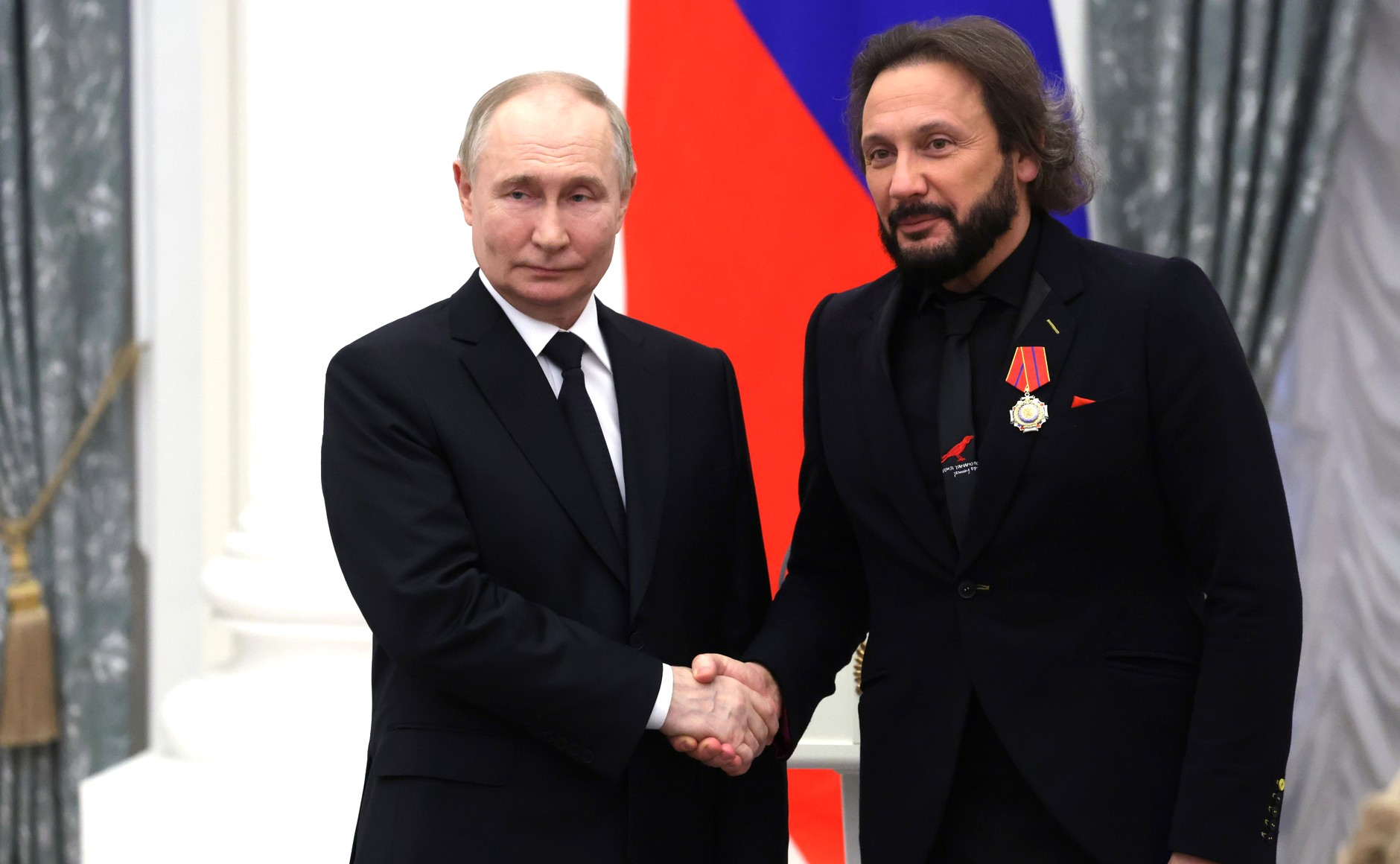
Mikhaylov receives the Order "For Merit in Culture and Art" from Russian president Vladimir Putin, 30 May 2024

- Свеча (Candle) (1997)
- Посвящение (Dedication) (2002)
- Позывные на любовь (Call-sign to the Love) (2004)
- К тебе иду (I'm Coming To You) (2005)
- Берега мечты (Coasts of the Dream) (2006)
- Небеса (Heaven) (2007)
- Жизнь-река (Life-river) (2008)
- Живой (Alive) (2010)
- Только ты (Only You) (2011)
- Джокер (2013)
- 1000 Шагов (1000 Steps) (2014)

== Compilations ==
- Все для тебя (Everything Is For You) (2007)
- Нежданная любовь (Unexpected Love) (2008)
- Лучшие песни на бис (The Best Songs Encore) (2010)
