= Taisia Povaliy =

Ukrainian singer (born 1964)

Taisia Povaliy Таїсія Повалій
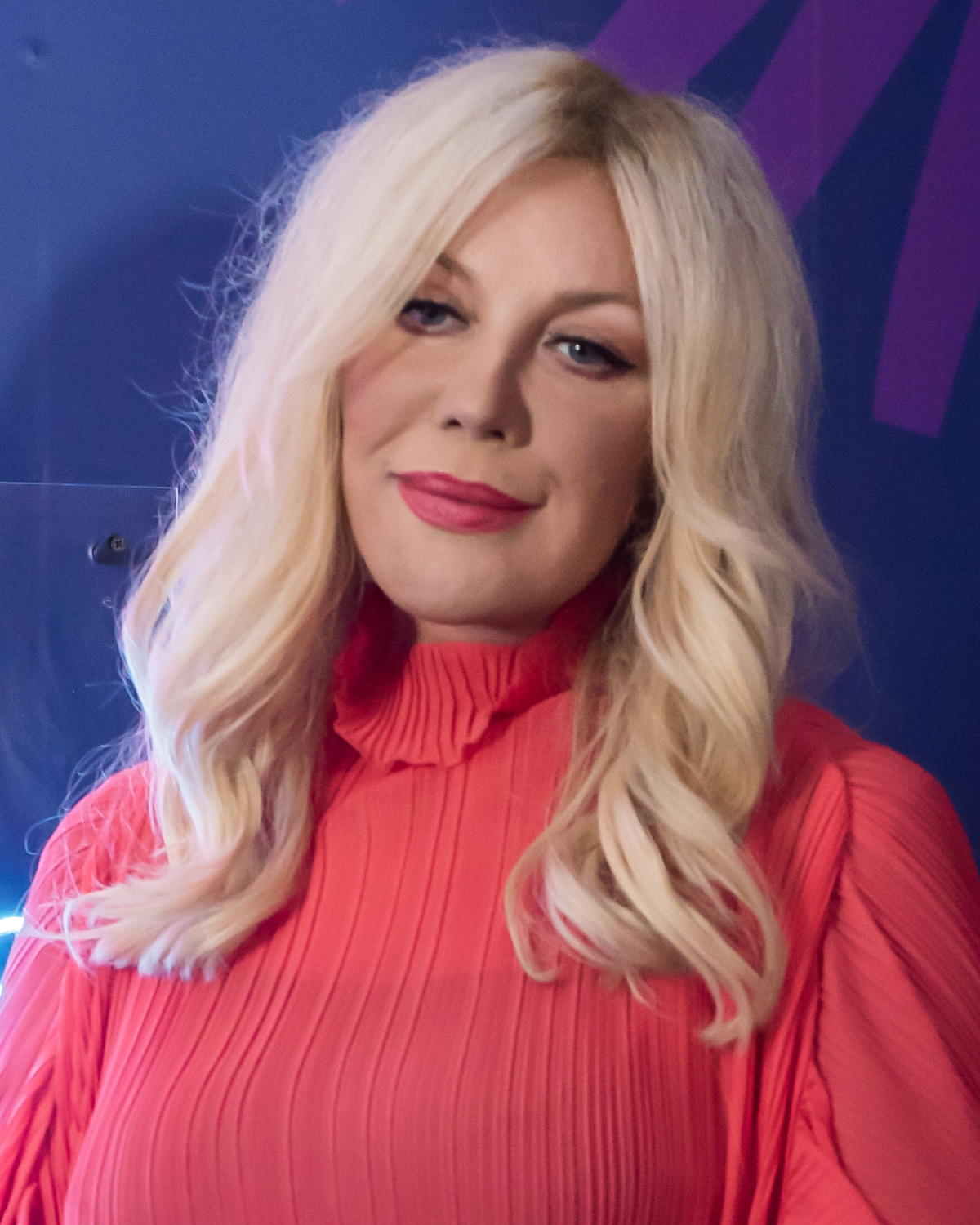
- Taisia Povaliy at White Nights Festival in Saint Petersburg in 2021
- Born: Taisia Mykolaivna Hiriavets; 10 December 1964 (age 61); Shamrayivka, Skvyra Raion, Kyiv Oblast, Ukrainian SSR, Soviet Union
- Occupations: singer; actress
- Awards: Merited Artist of Ukraine; People's Artist of Ukraine; Order of Friendship
- Musical career
- Genres: Pop; chanson; pop folk
- Instrument: Vocals
- Labels: NAC; Artur Music; UMG
- Website: povaliy.com

Taisia Mykolaivna Povaliy (Ukrainian: Таї́сія Микола́ївна Повалі́й; Russian: Таи́сия Никола́евна Повали́й, romanized: Taisiya Nikolaevna Povaliy; née Hiriavets, Ukrainian: Гиряве́ць, Russian: Гиряве́ц, romanized: Giryavets; born 10 December 1964) is a Soviet, Ukrainian, and Russian singer and actress.

She started her career of singer in 1985. In 1993, she won the Grand Prix at the Slavianski Bazaar in Vitebsk, Belarus.

In 1995, she released her first album. The next year she was awarded the honorary title of Merited Artist of Ukraine. In 1997, she was awarded the title of People's Artist of Ukraine. In 1998, she was awarded the Order of Saint Nicholas Thaumaturgus (International).

== Personal life ==
From 1982 to 1993, she was married to keyboardist Volodymyr Povaliy (born 6 June 1959), who worked in the Kyiv Music Hall as the artistic director of the singer Ivo Bobul's musical group, made backing tracks for Zhanna Bodnaruk, Vitalii Bilonozhko, Alla Kudlai and Taisia Povaliy, now he works as an arranger in the presidential orchestra. In this marriage, a son Denis Povaliy was born on 28 June 1983. In 1993, the marriage ended in divorce.

Since 31 December 1993, Taisia has been married for the second time to musician and producer Igor Likhuta (born 11 April 1961).

On February 22, 2022, she left Ukraine and lives in Moscow.

== Political views ==
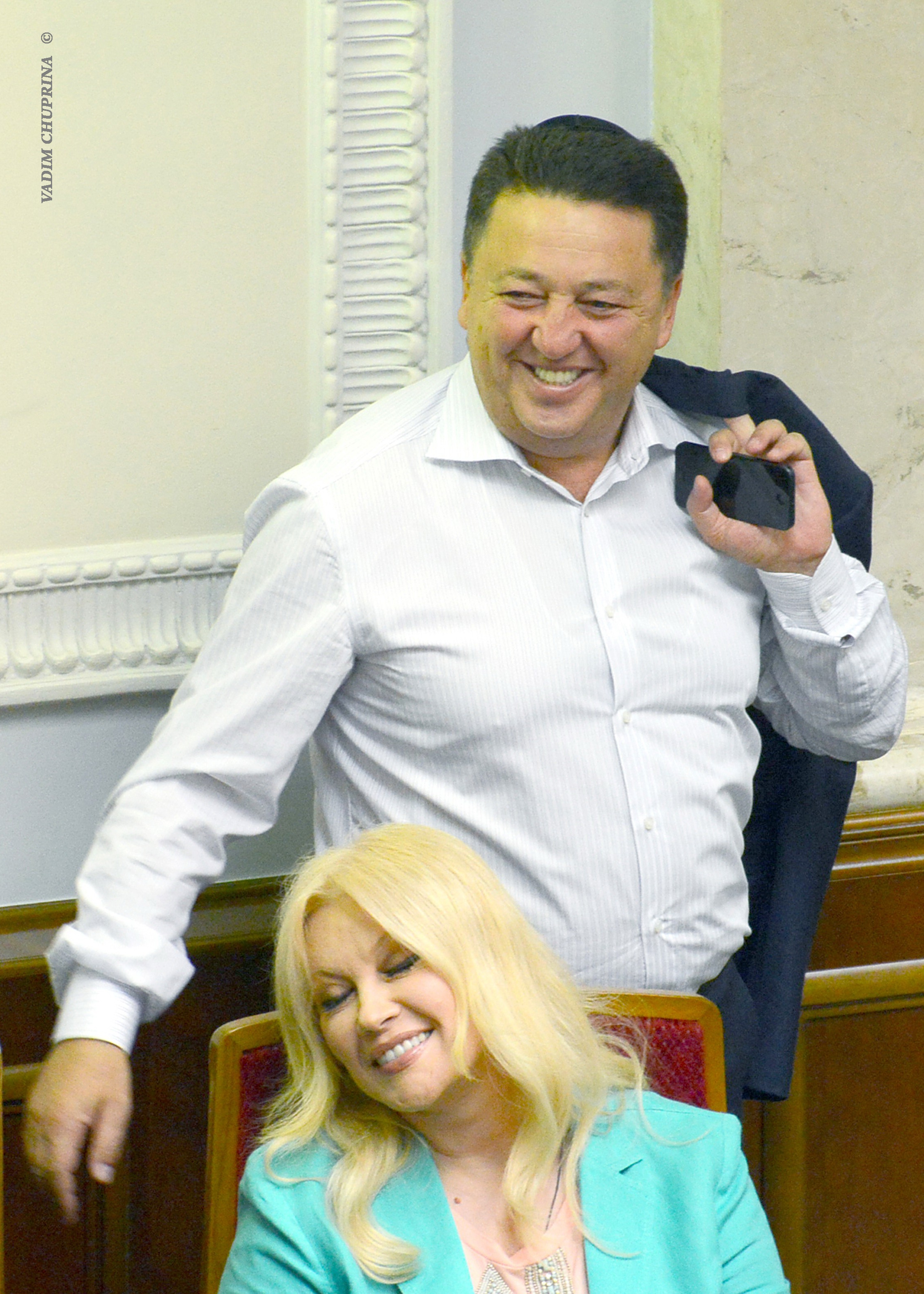
In the Verkhovna Rada together with Oleksandr Feldman, 2013

Povaliy was a candidate for Party of Regions at the October 2012 Ukrainian parliamentary election; placed second on the party list She was elected into parliament. She left the Party of Regions parliamentarian faction on 3 June 2014. Povaliy did not participate in the 2014 Ukrainian parliamentary election.

In 2015 Ukrainian parliament made a decree to remove Povali as Ukrainian National Singer because she does concerts in Russia.

On 9 May 2022 Povali performed in Russia at a concert for Victory Day, she did this 2.5 months after the Russian invasion of Ukraine.

In September 2022, the National Security and Defense Council of Ukraine added Taisia Povaliy to the sanctions list. During the 2023 New Years celebrations, Povaliy sang a traditional Ukrainian song on Russian state TV, which led her to being branded "shameless" and a "traitor" by many Ukrainians.

In February 2023, Povaliy stated that she supported Vladimir Putin's policy in Ukraine and called it "salvation". Povaliy also confirmed that she has been living in Russia since 2022.

In a large July 2024 video interview, Taisia Povaliy confirmed her pro-Russian views: she condemned the overthrow of Ukrainian President Yanukovych and the outbreak of hostilities in Donbas in 2014, calling Donbas the core of Ukraine, supported Russia's invasion of Ukraine in 2022, acknowledged receiving Russian citizenship and expressed confidence that Russia and Ukraine will be a single state, considering Russians and Ukrainians to be one people, while recognizing the existence of two languages.

== Discography ==
=== Studio albums ===
- Panno kokhannia (1995)
- Ya vas liubliu (1997)
- Sladkiy grekh (1999)
- Bude tak (2000)
- Odna-Yedyna (with Joseph Kobzon; 2002)
- Ptitsa volnaya (2002)
- Ukrainski pisenni perlyny (2002)
- Serdenko (2004)
- Za toboy (2007)
- Veryu tebe (2010)
- Serdtse – dom dlya lyubvi (2018)
- Eiforiia (2020)
- Osobennye slova. Ispoved (2021)

=== Live albums ===
- Ukraina. Golos. Dusha (2008)

=== Compilations albums ===
- Chortopolokh (2001)
- Charivna skrypka (2002)
- Vozvrashchayu (2003)
- Nakazany lyubovyu (2008)
- Ya pomoljus' (2012)
- Dve zvezdy (with Aleksandr Marshal; 2012)
- Osobennye slova (2020)

=== EPs ===
- Otpusti menya (with Nikolay Baskov; 2004)

== Filmography ==
Title	Year	Role	Notes
Golden Chicken (Золотой цыплёнок)	1993	Fox	Voice
Evenings on a Farm Near Dikanka (Вечера на хуторе близ Диканьки)	2001	Countess	
Cinderella (Золушка)	2002	Matchmaker	
The Snow Queen (Снежная королева)	2002	Ingrid	
A very New Year's movie, or a Night at the Museum (Очень новогоднее кино, или Ночь в музее)	2007	Sleeping beauty	
Golden Fish (Золотая рыбка)	2008	cameo	
