= Kizaru =

Russian rapper (born 1989)

- Born: Oleg Viktorovich Nechiporenko (Russian: Оле́г Ви́кторович Нечипоре́нко); May 21, 1989 (age 37)
- Genres: Hip hop; trap
- Occupations: Rapper; singer-songwriter
- Years active: 2010-present

Oleg Viktorovich Nechiporenko (Russian: Оле́г Ви́кторович Нечипоре́нко; born 21 May 1989), better known as Kizaru (stylized in lowercase letters), is a Russian rapper and singer-songwriter. Originally from Saint Petersburg, he currently lives in Barcelona. He is a member and founder of the group "Haunted Family".

== Biography ==
=== 2022: First Day Out & «Тебя любят там где меня нет» ===
At the end of October 2022, Kizaru announced a solo album that would be coming in November. On 18 November 2022, he released the studio album titled "Тебя любят там где меня нет" ("You are loved where I am Not").

== Legal issues ==
In 2014 Kizaru moved to Barcelona after his arrest in Saint Petersburg for trading narcotics. Oleg was wanted by Interpol, but his profile has long been deleted from the organization's website. He was jailed at the start of 2016. He served his prison term in the Spanish prison "Soto del Real" for three and a half months. As of May 2022, Nechiporenko was still on the federal wanted list. Kizaru was prohibited from entering Russian territory.

On 14 November 2021, Kizaru was arrested by Interpol in Germany for four months.

== Conflicts ==
=== Conflict with Yung Trappa ===
On 21 September 2017 on the YouTube-channel "Вписка" was an interview with Oleg, where he said, that Yung Trappa was his dealer and supplied him with narcotics. On 22 January 2018 on this YouTube channel came an interview with Vlad from the colony settlement, which he declared, that Kizaru was giving a lot of information, things he could not say, and that after the release, Vlad would go to Barcelona to deal with him. After the release, Vlad released a new interview on the channel «Вписка», where he spoke bad about Oleg, who in turn began to insult the rapper on Instagram, after which they insulted each other constantly for months. On 8 June 2021, Kizaru posted an audioclip of Vlad and an unknown girl, whom Yung Trappa asked to "help his finances". Oleg then posted screenshots of exchanges, where he is accused of violent acts against underage girls. Yung Trappa wrote in his Instagram stories, that he gives away money to his subscribers, and also promised, that on a new album he would prove that Kizaru worked with the police. The album was released in August 2021, but because there was no evidence, it was deemed a failure. In November Vlad was arrested due to rape allegations, and because of that, the conflict ended. After Yung Trappa's death, Oleg expressed his condolences.

== Musical style ==
His music style is inspired by rappers Boot Camp Clik, Heltah Skeltah, O.G.C. (band) & Black Moon (group).

== Books ==
- Дежавю. Богемский рэп, сода и я (2022)

== Discography ==
- Long Way Up EP (2016)
- Mas Fuerte (2016)
- «Яд» (2017)
- «Назад в будущее» (2018)
- Karmageddon (2019)
- SAY NO MO EP (2019)
- Born to Trap (2020)
- Bandana I (2021) (with Big Baby Tape)
- First Day Out (2022)
- «Тебя любят там где меня нет» (2022)
- «Gremlin EP» (2023)
- QUAZIMODO (2024)
- SIMBA (2025)
- Speedy Gonzales EP (2025)
- Bandana II (TBA) (with Big Baby Tape)
- Ca$hey (2026)

== Rating ==
Year	Platform	Rating	Place	Ref.
2020	Spotify	Top-5 singers in Russia	1	
2021	Spotify	Top-5 singers in Russia	3	
