= Zhara International Music Festival =

Annual music festival in Azerbaijan

Zhara Festival
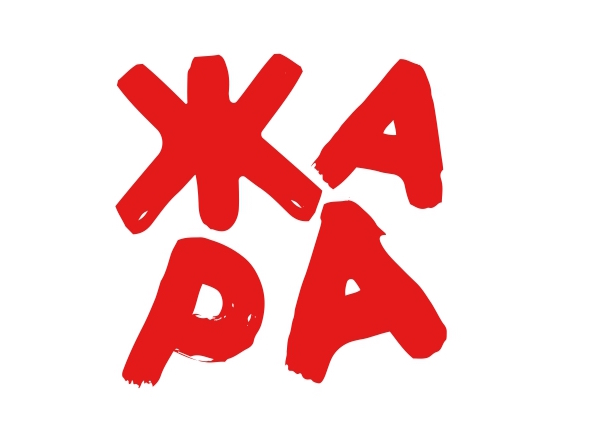
- Genre: Pop music
- Locations: Azerbaijan, Baku; Germany, Düsseldorf; Monaco; United Arab Emirates, Dubai; Russia, Sochi; Turkey, Bodrum
- Years active: 2016–present
- Website: https://zhara.tv/

Zhara Festival is a five-day music festival which takes place in Azerbaijan, near the coast of Caspian Sea every year. The festival was founded in 2016 by Grigory Leps, Sergey Kozhevnikov, and Emin Agalarov. Drawing 10,000 attendees to each year's festival, It is one of the largest music festivals held within Commonwealth of Independent States countries. One of the main guests of this festival was Dmitry Peskov, press secretary of the Russian Federation's president.

== History ==
The Zhara festival was first held in Baku, on 9 July 2016.

The second festival was held on 27 July 2017. This time even more CIS stars such as Valeriya, Loboda, Sergey Lazarev, the band Gradusy, Timur Rodriguez and others joined the festival.

The third festival was held on 27 July 2018. Special guest Steven Seagal sang in a duet with Emin Aghalarov. Other special guests were: Baskov, singers from Black Star inc. label.

Three years after the festival's creation, it was also held in Dubai, United Arab Emirates.

List of stars in the first festival was:

- 99Plajo
- A-DESSA
- Katya Lel
- Zulfiyya Khanbabayeva
- Philipp Kirkorov
- Aleksandr Revva
- Vlad Sokolovskiy
- Tomas N'evergreen
- Polina Gagarina

== See also ==
- Baku International Jazz Festival
- International World of Mugham Festival
