= Velvet Music =

Russian record label

- Founded: 2004
- Founder: Alyona Mikhaylova; Liana Meladze
- Distributor: ZVONKO digital
- Genre: Various
- Country of origin: Russia
- Location: Russia, Moscow
- Official website: velvetmusic.ru

Velvet Music is a Russian record label and production company established in February 2004 by Alyona Mikhailova and Liana Meladze.

== Artists ==
- Mari Kraimbrery
- Vintage
- Yolka
- Nyusha
- Vladimir Presnyakov
- Natalia Podolskaya
- Gosha Kutsenko
- Zvonkiy
- Daasha
- Venera
- Feigin
- Naidi
- Ars Jali
- Nikita Kiosse
- YAVЬ
- Nasty Ash
- Celofan
