= White Rose (disambiguation) =

The White Rose (die Weiße Rose in German) was a non-violent resistance movement in Nazi Germany, 1942-1943.

White Rose may also refer to:

== Arts and entertainment ==
=== Film ===
- The White Rose (1914 film), an American film
- White Rose (1919 film), a Hungarian film directed by Alexander Korda
- The White Rose (1923 film), directed by D. W. Griffith
- The White Rose (1933 film), an Egyptian film
- The White Rose (1954 film), a Cuban-Mexican drama film
- White Rose (2024 film), an Indian Tamil-language film

=== Literature ===
- The White Rose (Cook novel), a fantasy novel by Glen Cook
- The White Rose (Traven novel), by B. Traven
- Tokeah, or the White Rose, by Charles Sealsfield
- White Rose, part of a trilogy by R. Garcia y Robertson
- The White Rose (play), a 1991 play by playwright Lillian Garrett-Groag

=== Music ===
- White Rose (band), an Indonesian pop punk band
- "The White Rose" (song), a traditional Cornish folk song
- "White Rose", a song by Canadian folk/country artist Fred Eaglesmith
- Belye Rozy, or White Roses, a Russian Eurodisco song by Laskovyi Mai.

== Business ==
- White Rose Gasoline, a brand of Canadian Oil Companies
- White Rose oil field, off the coast of Newfoundland, Canada
- White Rose (food product), a low-cost food brand in New York City
- White Rose Centre, a shopping centre in Morley, West Yorkshire
- White Rose Hamburgers, a hamburger restaurant chain with locations in New Jersey

== Groups ==
- Order of the White Rose (1886–1915), a late Victorian Neo-Jacobite society
- White Rose (disinformation group), (2021) dedicated to spreading disinformation about COVID-19
- White Rose (Italy), an Italian political party (2008-2013)
- White Rose Foundation (de:Weiße Rose Stiftung) (1987), a foundation commemorating the White Rose resistance group

== Places ==
- White Rose, Indiana, an unincorporated community in the United States
- White Rose, a community that is now part of Aurora, Ontario, and Newmarket, Ontario, Canada

== Sports ==
- White Rose Stakes, an English horse race last run in 1993
- White Rose Varsity Tournament, a sports competition between the University of York and York St John College
- White Rose Classic, a Nike Tour golf tournament played only in 1993
- White Rose Trophy, a rugby league RFL Yorkshire Cup award from 1966 to 1993

== Transport in England ==
- White Rose cycle route, Yorkshire, part of the National Cycle Network
- White Rose Way (walking trail), a walking trail in West and North Yorkshire
- White Rose Way, Doncaster, a road in Doncaster, South Yorkshire
- White Rose railway station, a proposed railway station in West Yorkshire

== Other uses ==
- White Rose of York, the symbol of Yorkshire and the House of York
- Order of the White Rose of Finland, an award in Finland
- White Rose University Consortium, a partnership between the University of Leeds, University of Sheffield and University of York
  - White Rose College of the Arts & Humanities, a doctoral training partnership
- PGC 6240, also known as the White Rose galaxy, in the constellation Hydrus
- NGC 7789, also known as the White Rose cluster, a star cluster in the constellation Cassiopeia
- Bánh bao bánh vạc, a Vietnamese dumpling, often called "White Rose" by westerners
- White Rose Project, a proposed power plant in the UK
- White Rose Inn, a listed building in Lindsey, Suffolk, England

== See also ==
- Lydia Litvyak (1921–1943), Soviet World War II fighter pilot nicknamed the "White Rose of Stalingrad"
- White Rose Lane, a Local Nature Reserve in Woking, Surrey, England
- White Rose Movement, a British post-punk band
- Die Weiße Rose (film), a 1982 German film based on the anti-Nazi movement
- Weiße Rose (opera), a 1976 opera by Udo Zimmermann
- Julian Whiterose, stage name of early 20th century calypso singer and songwriter Henry Julian
- Whiterose, a character in the television series Mr. Robot
