= Laskovyi Mai (film) =

- Directed by: Vladimir Vinogradov
- Written by: Yelena Rayskaya
- Produced by: Yefim Lyubinsky
- Starring: Vyacheslav Manucharov; Sergey Romanovich; Dmitry Blokhin; Viktor Verzhbitsky
- Cinematography: Sergey Yudayev
- Music by: Aleksey Shelygin
- Production companies: Dixi-TV; Karoprokat
- Release date: 2009
- Running time: 115 minutes
- Country: Russia
- Language: Russian
- Budget: US $4,500,000

Laskovyi Mai (Russian: Ла́сковый май) is a 2009 Russian biographical film about the best-selling Soviet boy-band Laskovyi Mai.

== Plot ==
In 1985, during the period of Perestroika in the Soviet Union, the musical group Laskovyi Mai was formed. Their concerts were always sold out, and their immense popularity led to mass adoration—some fans even committed suicide due to unrequited love for the band’s members. The fame of the band’s creator, Andrei Razin, soon overshadowed that of Mikhail Gorbachev himself.

A childhood photograph of Razin with the Gorbachev family, taken by chance on a beach, changed his fate. Using the photo, Razin hinted that he was related to Gorbachev, which opened all doors for him—television, radio, and the Soviet stage.

Razin began traveling across orphanages throughout the USSR, recruiting talented children for multiple touring versions of Laskovyi Mai. The group performed in several cities simultaneously, sometimes giving five to six concerts per day. During its seven-year existence, Laskovyi Mai never had an unsold ticket; nearly one in five Soviet citizens attended one of their concerts.

The film shows how the story ends differently for each character. The young musicians, particularly lead singer Yuri Shatunov, achieve fame; Razin earns his greatest fortune; and two unfortunate female fans, after being raped by gangsters, commit suicide. By the end of 1991, as Gorbachev resigns from the presidency and the cultural house faces closure, the band performs one final concert to a full audience — an overwhelming success.

== Cast ==
- Vyacheslav Manucharov as Andrei Razin, producer of Laskovyi Mai
- Sergey Romanovich as Yuri Shatunov, lead singer of Laskovyi Mai
- Maxim Litovchenko as Sergey Kuznetsov, composer for the band
- Kristina Kuznetsova as Natasha
- Dmitry Blokhin as the collective farm chairman
- Lyudmila Zaitseva as Valentina Mikhaylovna Gostyeva, Razin’s foster grandmother
- Ivan Agapov as Mikhail Gorbachev, General Secretary of the CPSU
- Natalia Starykh as Raisa Gorbacheva
- Raisa Konyukhova as Maria Panteleyevna Gorbacheva, Mikhail Gorbachev’s mother
- Maxim Kostromykin as Maksim, Razin’s friend
- Marina Oryol as Katya (a composite character based on Natalia Gulkina and Katya Semyonova)
- Raisa Ryazanova as Valentina Nikolaevna Tazekenova, head of the orphanage
- Pyotr Skvortsov as Kolya
- Yekaterina Fedulova as Lilia, Razin’s girlfriend (based on Irina Bespalova, Razin’s first common-law wife)
- Vasiliy Belokopytov as security chief
- Viktoria Matveyeva as Sergey’s mother
- Viktor Verzhbitsky as circus director
- Vladimir Steklov as Aleksandr N. Aksyonov, chairman of the State Committee of Television and Radio Broadcasting of the Soviet Union
- Ivan Shabaltas as the prosecutor
- Yevgeny Samarin as host of Little Blue Light
- Inga Oboldina as teacher-supervisor

== Release and reception ==
Yuri Shatunov said the following about the film in an interview with Argumenty i Fakty: "This film is not the true story of the group. It was made without my participation — I was simply presented with the finished result. A lot in the movie is embellished, although there are a few very accurate moments that hit the mark. For example, how Andrei Razin was accidentally photographed with Gorbachev and then claimed to be his nephew. But as for me — none of those events actually happened to me. There’s nothing real of me in this movie, except for my name, surname, and my songs. Still, the film turned out well — positive and nicely done."
