= Julian D. Richards =

British archaeologist and academic

Julian D. Richards OBE FSA
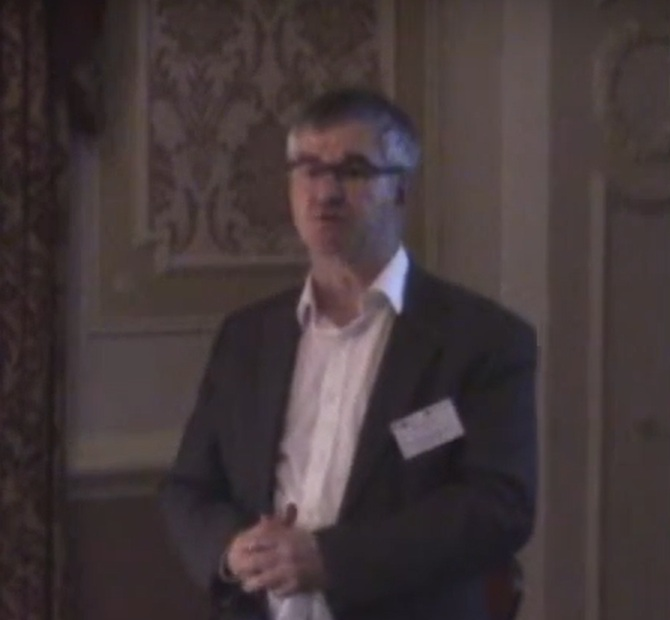
- Richards in 2016

Academic background
- Education: University of Cambridge; North Staffordshire Polytechnic

Academic work
- Discipline: Archaeologist
- Sub-discipline: Early medieval period; Anglo-Saxons; Viking Age; archaeological computing
- Institutions: University of Leeds; University of York

Julian Daryl Richards OBE FSA is a British archaeologist and academic. He works at the University of York where he is Professor of Archaeology, director of its Centre for Digital Heritage, and director of the Archaeology Data Service (ADS). He is also co-director of the academic journal Internet Archaeology, and contributed to the founding of The White Rose College of the Arts & Humanities. His work focuses on the archaeological applications of information technology. He has participated in excavations at Cottam, Cowlam, Burdale, Wharram Percy, and Heath Wood barrow cemetery.

== Career ==
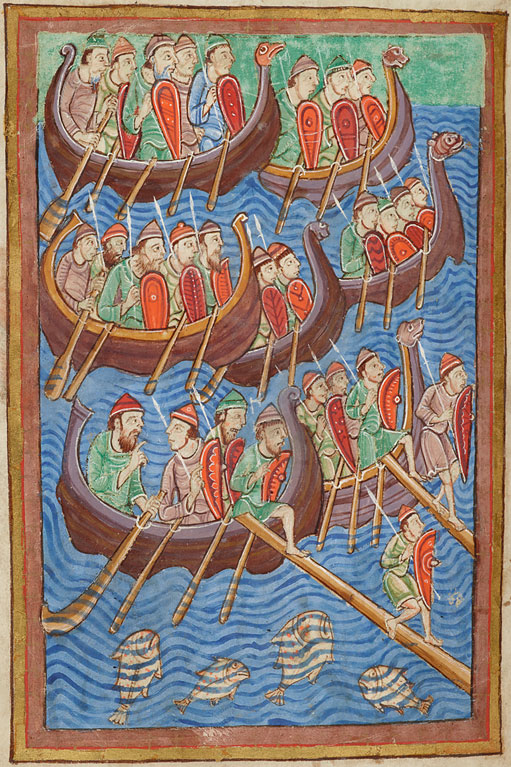
Sea-faring Danes depicted invading England, from the Miscellany on the Life of St. Edmund, c. 1130 AD

Richards studied archaeology and anthropology at the University of Cambridge, after switching from history. He began his Doctor of Philosophy (PhD) degree at North Staffordshire Polytechnic in 1980, researching burial rituals among pre-Christian Anglo-Saxons. His doctoral thesis was titled "An investigation of the significance of form and decoration in Early Anglo-Saxon funerary urns" and was completed in 1985.

In the 1970s or 1980s Richards was a volunteer in the excavations of Viking Age settlements around the Coppergate Shopping Centre in York. He then spent time at the University of Leeds, before returning to York in 1986 to lecture about Anglo-Saxon and Viking archaeology at the University of York.

Richards lectured at the University of York, concentrating on Anglo-Saxon and Viking Age archaeology, particularly mortuary behaviour and settlement evolution, in England. In that capacity he published Viking Age England in 1991, and has worked at Cottam, Cowlam, Burdale, Wharram Percy, and Heath Wood barrow cemetery. As of February 2018, he is re-examining a winter camp used by the Great Viking Army at Torksey, Lincolnshire, stretching over 136 acres (55 ha).

Another concentration of Richards is the intersection of archaeology and technology. In 1985 he co-edited a textbook on archaeological computing, Current Issues in Archaeological Computing, a focus of subsequent books and papers. He is the director of the Archaeology Data Service, a digital archive of archaeological research, and the co-director of Internet Archaeology, an electronic peer-reviewed journal. He is also the director the Centre for Digital Heritage at the University of York. He was elected a Fellow of the Society of Antiquaries in 1991 and is a Member of the Chartered Institute for Archaeologists (MCIfA).

Richards was appointed Officer of the Order of the British Empire (OBE) in the 2024 New Year Honours for services to heritage and digital archiving.

== Selected works ==
- Richards, Julian D. (1992). "Anglo Saxon Symbolism". In Carver, Martin (ed.). The Age of Sutton Hoo: The seventh century in north-western Europe. Woodbridge: Boydell Press. pp. 131–147.
- Richards, Julian D. (2005). The Vikings: A very short introduction. Oxford: Oxford University Press. ISBN 978-0-19-280607-9.
- Richards, Julian D.; Hadley, Dawn M. (2016). "The Viking Winter Camp and Anglo-Scandinavian Town at Torksey, Lincolnshire – The Landscape Context". In Turner, Val E.; Owen, Olwyn A.; Waugh, Doreen J. (eds.). Shetland and the Viking World: Papers from the Seventeenth Viking Congress, Lerwick. Lerwick: Shetland Amenities Trust. pp. 127–139. ISBN 978-0-9932740-3-9.
- Hadley, Dawn M.; Richards, Julian D. (September 2016). "The Winter Camp of the Viking Great Army, AD 872–3, Torksey, Lincolnshire" (PDF). The Antiquaries Journal. 96. Society of Antiquaries of London: 23–67. doi:10.1017/s0003581516000718. S2CID 132613900.
- Hadley, D.M; Richards, J.D. (2021). The Viking Great Army and the Making of England. Thames and Hudson. ISBN 978-0500022016.
