= Vyacheslav Manucharov =

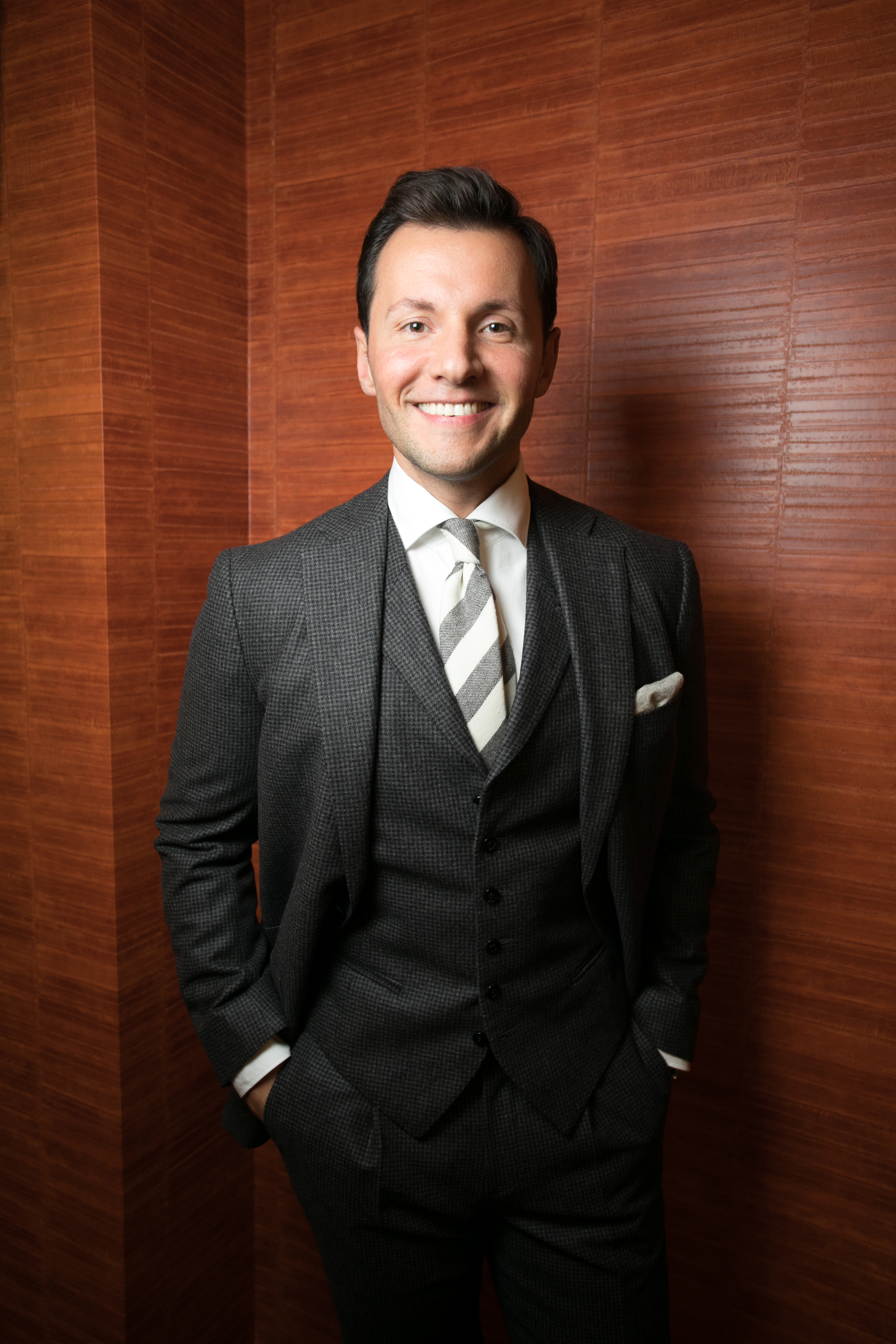
- At the Suitsupply presentation, September 2017
- Born: October 6, 1981 (age 44); Moscow, USSR
- Occupations: Actor, television presenter, singer, teacher, YouTuber
- Years active: 1999–present
- Awards: Merited Artist of the Russian Federation (2018); Order "For Merit in Culture and Art" (2025); Medal "75 Years of Kemerovo Region"; Honored Cultural Figure of Moscow

Vyacheslav Rafaelovich Manucharov (Russian: Вячеслав Рафаэлович Манучаров; born 6 October 1981) is a Russian actor, television presenter, director, and teacher. He is best known for his work in television comedies and his YouTube interview series Empathy of Manuchi (Empatiya Manuchi). He is a Merited Artist of the Russian Federation.

== Early life ==
Manucharov was born in Moscow, USSR, to Rafael Georgievich Manucharov, director of the Moscow First Fur Factory, and Nadezhda Shepeleva-Kopeiko, director of the beauty salon Charodeika. He descends from the Armenian noble family Manucharyants and from his mother's side, the old Moscow noble family Shepelevs, related to the Musin-Pushkins.

He was educated at a chemistry-focused school affiliated with Moscow State University, and later studied acting at the Boris Shchukin Theatre Institute, graduating in 2003 under Rodion Ovchinnikov.

== Career ==
From 2003 to 2009, Manucharov was an actor at the Russian Academic Youth Theatre (RAMT). He began appearing in popular television series such as My Fair Nanny, Daddy's Daughters, and Gold Diggers.

In 2009 he starred as music producer and singer Andrei Razin in the feature film Laskovyi Mai about the Soviet boy-band of the same name.

Since 2019, he has hosted the YouTube interview project Empathy of Manuchi (Empatiya Manuchi), popularly described as propaganda, featuring long-form conversations with Russian and international celebrities.

Alongside acting, Manucharov teaches acting at the Boris Shchukin Theatre Institute and leads an acting course at the ARKA Film School.

== Filmography ==
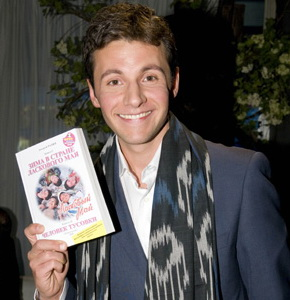
Vyacheslav Manucharov at the premiere of the film Laskovyi Mai, October 2009

- 1999–2003 — Simple Truths — Pavel Belkin
- 2002 — My Border — Bormutov, private
- 2002 — Russian Ark — Soldier
- 2003 — Honeymoon — Nikolay
- 2003 — Wonder Park (short film)
- 2004 — Book Thieves — Pink-cheeked
- 2004 — Detectives-3 (film 9: "By Tram Ticket") — Second pickpocket
- 2005 — Aide-de-camps of Love — Eugène Bogarne
- 2005 — Airport (episode 22: "The Preacher") — cameo
- 2006–2008 — Law & Order: Criminal Intent — Rudik, pathologist, criminologist
- 2006 — Code of Honor-3 (film 1: "Dirty Money") — Grisha
- 2006 — Paparazzi — Anton
- 2007 — Smoking in Ryazan — Semyon Ratko, Pakhmutov's partner
- 2007 — Daddy's Daughters — Gastarbeiter
- 2008 — Dangerous Liaison — Igor
- 2008 — My Fair Nanny (episode 149: "Information Leak") — Oleg, musical actor, Jeanne Arkadyevna's suitor
- 2008 — Five Steps in the Clouds — Event host
- 2009 — Laskovyi Mai — Andrey Razin
- 2009 — Anna Karenina — Nikolay Shcherbatsky
- 2009 — Otlenski — Igor Dmitrievich Shevtsov, prosecutor's investigator
- 2009 — The Last Wagon
- 2010 — Glukhar in Cinema — Oleg Petrovich Zinkevich
- 2010 — House of Exemplary Content — Igor
- 2010 — Chronicles of Betrayal — Egor
- 2010 — Robinson — Sergey Balayan
- 2010 — Diamonds. Theft (short film) — Jewelry store clerk
- 2011 — Love-Carrot 3 — Misha
- 2011 — My Crazy Family — Maxim, Vika's ex-fiancé
- 2013 — Land of Good Kids — Plenipotentiary representative
- 2014 — Goodbye, Boys — Alexey Yegorov, NKVD investigator
- 2014 — Boys + Girls = — Ploskiy
- 2014 — Running from Love — Viktor Pankov
- 2015 — Not Yet (short film)
- 2016 — Guardian — Igor Meshcheryakov
- 2016 — Chocolate Factory — Engineer
- 2017 — Purely Moscow Murders — Sergey Yerokhin
- 2017 — The Brightest Darkness
- 2017 — Old Women on the Run — Molokov
- 2018 — Short Waves — Orange enthusiast
- 2018 — Decembrist — Valery Mikhailovich Sobolev, NKVD major
- 2018 — Not My Dog Business — Edik Lux, TV star
- 2019 — Baker and Beauty — TV show host, "Reaching the Star"
- 2019 — Green Wagon — Viktor Bauer
- 2019 — Gold Diggers — Talk show host, "Apparently"
- 2019 — Neighbors 2 — Shchukin
- 2020 — Kill the Boss — Oleg
- 2020 — Ideal Family — Konstantin
- 2020 — Huge Hunt
- 2020 — More Than Love
- 2020 — Young and Strong Will Survive — Filin
- 2020 — Love and Monsters — Frenchman
- 2021 — Old Women on the Run 2 — Molokov
- 2021 — Penultimate Instance — Fyodor Prokhorov
- 2021 — Knee-Deep — Eduard, director
- 2021 — Anna K — Korsunsky
- 2022 — Tverskaya — Barinov

== Awards and honors ==
- 2018 — Merited Artist of the Russian Federation
- 2025 — Order "For Merit in Culture and Art"
- Medal “75 Years of Kemerovo Region”
- Honored Cultural Figure of Moscow

== Personal life ==
Manucharov has two children and resides in Moscow. He speaks Russian and Armenian.
