= Vladimir Shurochkin =

Russian composer (born 1966)

- Born: Vladimir Vyacheslavovich Shurochkin; April 12, 1966 (age 60); Moscow, Soviet Union
- Occupation: Singer
- Years active: 1989–1990

Vladimir Shurochkin (Russian: Владимир Вячеславович Шурочкин; born 12 April 1966) is a Russian singer and musician. He is one of the former lead singers of Laskovyi Mai (1989—1990). He is the father and producer of pop star Nyusha and synchronized swimmer Maria Shurochkina.

He was born in Moscow.

== Biography ==
=== 1989–1995: "Laskovyi Mai" ===
Fame came to Vladimir Shurochkin in 1989, when he became a member of the Laskovyi Mai pop group.

In the second half of the 1980s, Shurochkin was one of the musicians of the Rush Hour VIA under the direction of Mikhail Tomilin. The ensemble performed music in the style of "electropop" with elements of the "new wave" and was based at the studio of the famous composer Igor Granov.

At the end of 1988, a conflict occurred between Igor Granov and the producer of the Laskovy May group, Andrei Razin. The reason was the disruption of the planned tour of "Laskovyi Mai" in Kharkov, which was organized by Granov. In order not to cancel the concerts, Igor Granov decided to release the musicians of the Rush Hour group on stage.

In the shortest possible time they rehearsed all the material of "Laskovyi Mai" and worked out all the scheduled concerts called "Laskovyi Mai-2". Moreover, unlike the original "Laskovyi Mai", they played and sang exclusively "live", that is, without a phonogram.

After that, Igor Granov officially assigned the name "Laskovyi Mai-2" to the team, and Vladimir Shurochkin and 13-year-old Roman Emelianenko became the main soloists of the group. The “Birds” magnetic album is released (already with its own repertoire), and the “Doves” video clip is actively rotated on television.

In March 1989, composer Sergei Kuznetsov left Laskovyi Mai. And then, despite the inflamed "information war" between the two groups, Andrey Razin invited Shurochkin to participate in his project as a composer and vocalist. Together with the poet Alla Goltseva, Vladimir wrote several songs that were published as the eighth magnetic album of "Laskovyi Mai" called "Goodbye, baby!". A couple of songs in the album are performed by Andrey Razin, the rest are by Shurochkin himself. The album became the leader of the hit parade of the Moskovsky Komsomolets newspaper.

In 1990, Shurochkin left the group and began a solo career.

=== 2008–2014: Music producer ===
Vladimir Shurochkin is not only the father of the singer Nyusha, but also her music producer. At the beginning of his career as a singer, he came up with songs for Nyusha, but soon Nyusha began to write her own songs.

== Family ==
Father Vyacheslav Vitalyevich Shurochkin (born May 12, 1940). Mother Svetlana Alekseevna Shurochkina (nee Vasina) (born February 23, 1943).

Sister Alina Kopylova (born August 27, 1963).

Daughters Anna (1990) – singer, better known as Nyusha, Maria (1995) – Russian synchronized swimmer, two-time Olympic champion, 11-time world champion.

Son Ivan Shurochkin (born September 29, 1997) is a fitness trainer and sports nutrition specialist.

First wife Irina Aleksandrovna Shurochkina (Kalitchenko) (b. 25 June 1967), divorced when daughter Anna was 2 years old.

Second wife Oksana Vladimirovna Shurochkina (Baranovskaya) (b. 08/21/1972), master of sports in artistic gymnastics – mother of Maria and Ivan, co-producer of Nyusha's albums.
