= Julian Richards =

Julian Richards may refer to:

- Julian C. Richards, British television and radio presenter, writer and archaeologist
- Julian D. Richards, British archaeologist and professor
- Julian Richards (director), Welsh film director
