= Andrei Razin (singer) =

Russian musician

Andrei Razin Андре́й Ра́зин
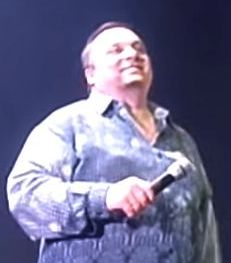
- Born: Андрей Разин; 15 September 1963 (age 62); Stavropol, Russia, USSR
- Citizenship: Russia, Türkiye
- Education: East Siberian State Institute of Culture Stavropol State University
- Alma mater: East Siberian Academy of Culture and Arts; Stavropol State University
- Occupations: Singer producer politician founder of the group "Laskovyj Maj"
- Years active: 1985–present
- Notable work: Masquerade, Uncle Misha, Goodbye baby I don't need any more, Old Forest, Fatima, If you remember, Ah Christina ah, Red Limousine, Ataman, Ugly Duckling, Crimean Coast, Island for Two, Eldorado, You Are Alone on the Whole Earth, 2009 — Laskovy May — Cameo (film), In the summer of 1990 Razin's first book "Winter in the Land of Laskovy May" was published, On 1 August 1990 the first issue of the newspaper "Laskovy May" was published, On 1 April 1991 Razin's second book "The Party Man" was published, Member of the Union of Journalists of Belarus (2006) and the Union of Journalists of Russia, Member of the Union of Writers of Belarus.
- Children: Ilya (born 1985) Alexander (2001–2017)
- Parents: Alexander Vatslavovich Razin (father); Valentina Ivanovna Krivorotova (born in 1941 in Ussuriysk) (mother)

The speaking voice of Andrei Razin
Interview from the Echo of Moscow program, 29 September 2009.

Andrei Aleksandrovich Razin (Russian: Андре́й Алекса́ндрович Ра́зин; born 15 September 1963) is a Russian musician, producer of the group Laskovyi Mai.

== Biography ==
=== Early life ===
Razin was born in Stavropol. From 1964 to 1972 he was brought up in the Kislovodsk sanatorium orphanage. From 1972 to 1978 he was a pupil of the Svetlogradsky orphanage, where he finished 8 classes.

From 1977 to 1979 he studied at the Stavropol GPTU 24, received the profession of mason. From 1979 to 1982 he worked on the direction of the Komsomol in the regions of the Far North. From 1979 to 1982, he worked under Komsomol direction in the Far North, including the cities of Nizhnevartovsk, Novy Urengoy, and Nadym. He participated in the construction of the Urengoy-Pomary-Uzhgorod gas pipeline. He graduated from evening high school in Urengoy.In 1985, he worked as deputy chairman for supplies at the Sverdlov collective farm in the village of Privolnoye, Krasnogvardeisky district, Stavropol Krai. After receiving money to buy a combine harvester, he went to Moscow.

He graduated from the East Siberian Academy of Culture and Arts, and Stavropol State University. Andrei Razin is the author of many songs for the band Laskovyi Mai, including such hits as Belye Rozy, Belye Rozy, Pink Evening, Uncle Misha, Everything, Homeless Dog, and others. Some of the songs have been adapted for screen and used in feature films, such as Laskoviy May (2009) and How Much Are Laskoviy Now? (1990).

In addition to his musical work, Razin is a literary author. His first book, Winter in the Land of Laskoviy May, was published in the summer of 1990. The first issue of the newspaper "Laskoviy May" was published on 1 August 1990. Razin's second book, Party Man, was published on 1 April 1991.

Razin is a member of the Union of Journalists of Belarus (since 2006), the Union of Journalists of Russia, and the Union of Writers of Belarus.

=== 1985-99 ===
In 1985 he first appeared on television as a singer. From 1988 to 1991 – General Director of the All-Union Central Creative Studio of the Ministry of Culture of the USSR for gifted orphans. In 1985, he first appeared on television as a singer with the song You and I in the program Morning Mail (issue On the ship Georgia).

In 1985, he briefly worked as an assistant director for the Chita Committee for Television and Radio. From 1985 to 1986, he served as deputy director of the Ryazan Regional Philharmonic. In 1986, he worked at the Saratov Philharmonic as an assistant director for the Integral group. From 1987 to 1990, he was a producer-manager at the All-Union Association of the USSR Ministry of Culture SPM Record.

In 1993, Razin became the rector of the Stavropol Institute of Contemporary Arts at Stavropol State University. In the 1996 Russian presidential election, he was the trustee of Gennady Zyuganov. Also in December he ran for the State Duma of the third convocation in Stavropol single-mandate electoral district No. 55 as an independent deputy. In the election he took 2nd place out of 16 (14.38% of votes), losing to Vasily Iver (18.08%).

=== 2000-present ===
On 1 July 2008, by the decision of the president of the Russian Olympic Committee, he was appointed general director of the International Olympic Festival and the post of artistic director of the Russian Olympic Committee.

In November 2022, Sergey Malinkovich, the Chairman of the Communists of Russia political party, accused Razin of treason for selling the rights to the songs of the band Laskovyi Mai (Tender May) to an American company.

== Mirage ==
He worked as the administrator of the Mirage group. For the first time he performed a duet with singer Katya Semyonova. This was later played out in the 2009 feature film Tender May, where Semyonova became the prototype for the singer Katenka.

== Laskovyi Mai ==
From 1987 to 1990 he worked as a producer-manager in the All-Union Association of the Ministry of Culture of the USSR SPM Record. In June 1988, the album of the group Laskovyi Mai, recorded in the city of Orenburg, got into Razin's hands. On 4 July that year, he moved the group to Moscow. On 9 September 1988 Yuri Shatunov became the lead singer of the group. Then followed work in the recording studio and numerous tours by the band. His idol was the singer Donna Summer, so he himself became a soloist of Laskovyi Mai. He performed songs of his band and hits of other famous authors. In the first five years of Laskovyi Mai's performances, over 47 million tickets were sold. Due to their incredible success, the group was entered into the Guinness Book of World Records.
