= La rosa blanca =

La rosa blanca may refer to:

- The White Rose (1954 film), a Cuban-Mexican drama film
- Rosa Blanca, a 1961 Mexican film
- La Rosa Blanca, an anti-Castro organization founded by Rafael Díaz-Balart

== See also ==
- White Rose (disambiguation)
