= Lucy Moore (Wikipedia editor) =

British archaeologist and Wikipedia editor

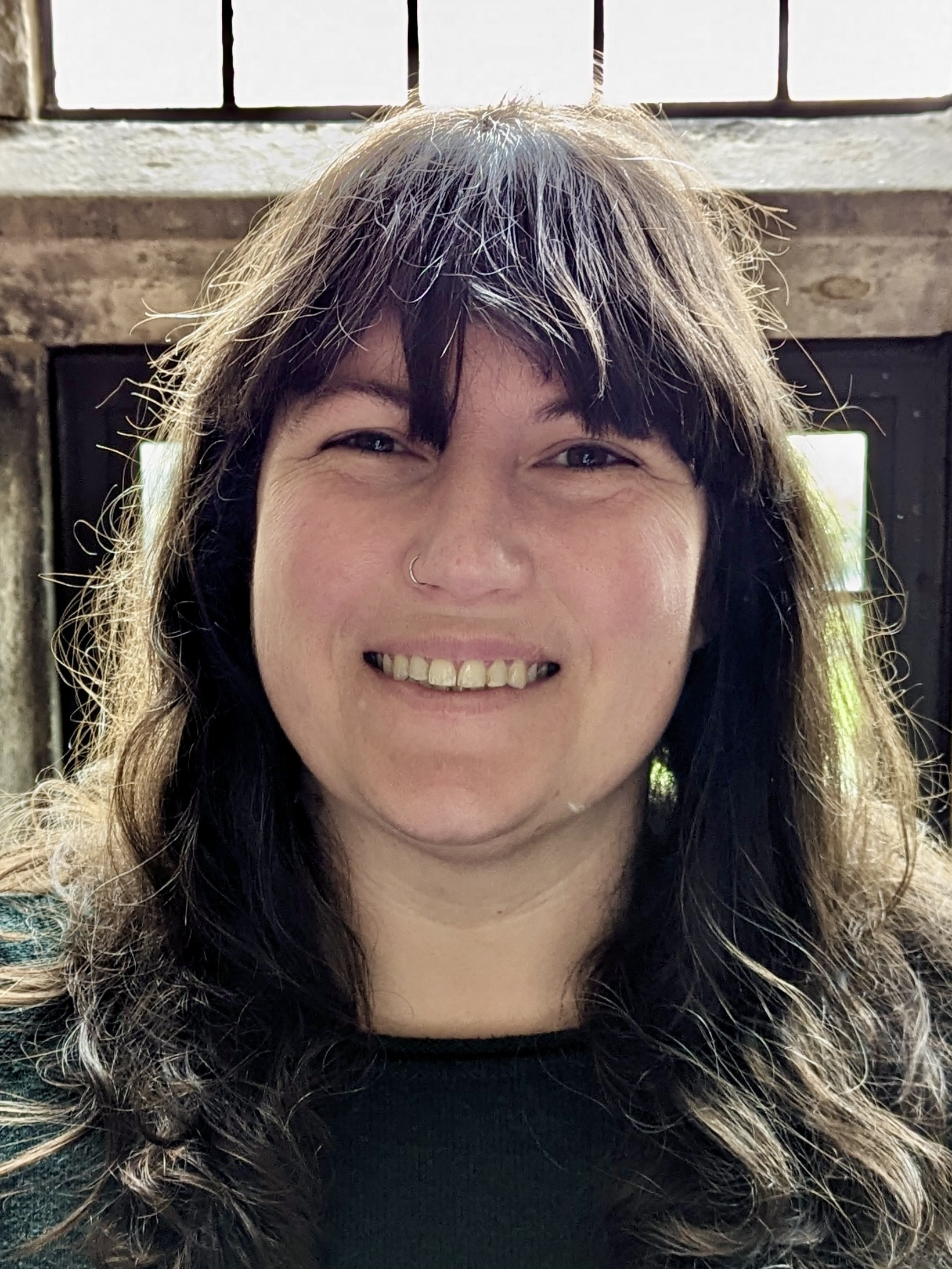
- Moore in April 2024
- Occupations: Archaeologist, curator, Wikipedia editor

Academic background
- Education: Wadham College, University of Oxford, University of Leeds, University of York
- Thesis: Coinage in 9th-century Northumbria: Copper-alloy, Kings and Vikings (2025)
- Doctoral advisor: Dawn Hadley; Andrew Woods

Lucy Moore is a British curator and numismatist, known for improving the coverage of women on Wikipedia. She was UK Wikimedian of the Year in 2022.

== Education ==
Moore earned a BA in Modern History in 2006 from Wadham College, University of Oxford, then an MA in Medieval Studies in 2009 from the Institute for Medieval Studies at the University of Leeds. Studying part-time while working in a call-centre, she focused on researching early medieval coinage. In 2019 she began doctoral research at the University of York. Her 2025 thesis is titled Coinage in 9th-century Northumbria: Copper-alloy, Kings and Vikings.

== Career ==
Moore is an archaeologist and curator. After completing her MA, she juggled work as a carer and for the National Trust with internships and fixed-term contracts at Leeds Museums & Galleries and the Ashmolean Museum. In 2013, Moore gained the position of Project Curator at Leeds Museums and Galleries a position she held until 2023. During this period, she co-authored the 2015 book Great War Britain. Leeds: Remembering 1914-18.

In 2024, Moore became Associate Curator of Numismatic and Object Collections in the Leeds University Libraries. At that time, she also worked as an unpaid carer.

Alongside Wikipedia editing, Moore has undertaken voluntary work, including being a trustee of the Royal Numismatic Society, Leeds Civic Trust, and Carers Leeds.

== Wikipedia editing ==
Moore became a Wikipedia editor in 2019. Her initial editing focused on soldiers in World War I, but she later decided to improve Wikipedia's coverage of women, who are underrepresented in Wikipedia articles.

In 2021, Moore started a project to create a Wikipedia article for a woman from every country in the world. She completed the project in 2024, ahead of International Women's Day. As of March 2024, Moore had written 533 biographies of women, including Sharbat Gula, Julia Chinn, Jeanne Gapiya-Niyonzima, Ólafía Einarsdóttir and Gloria Meneses.

Moore also works to encourage others to volunteer on the effort to improve gender representation on Wikipedia, including as an edit-a-thon leader. She has commented that "I think it’s made me better at listening and more compassionate".

== Honors ==
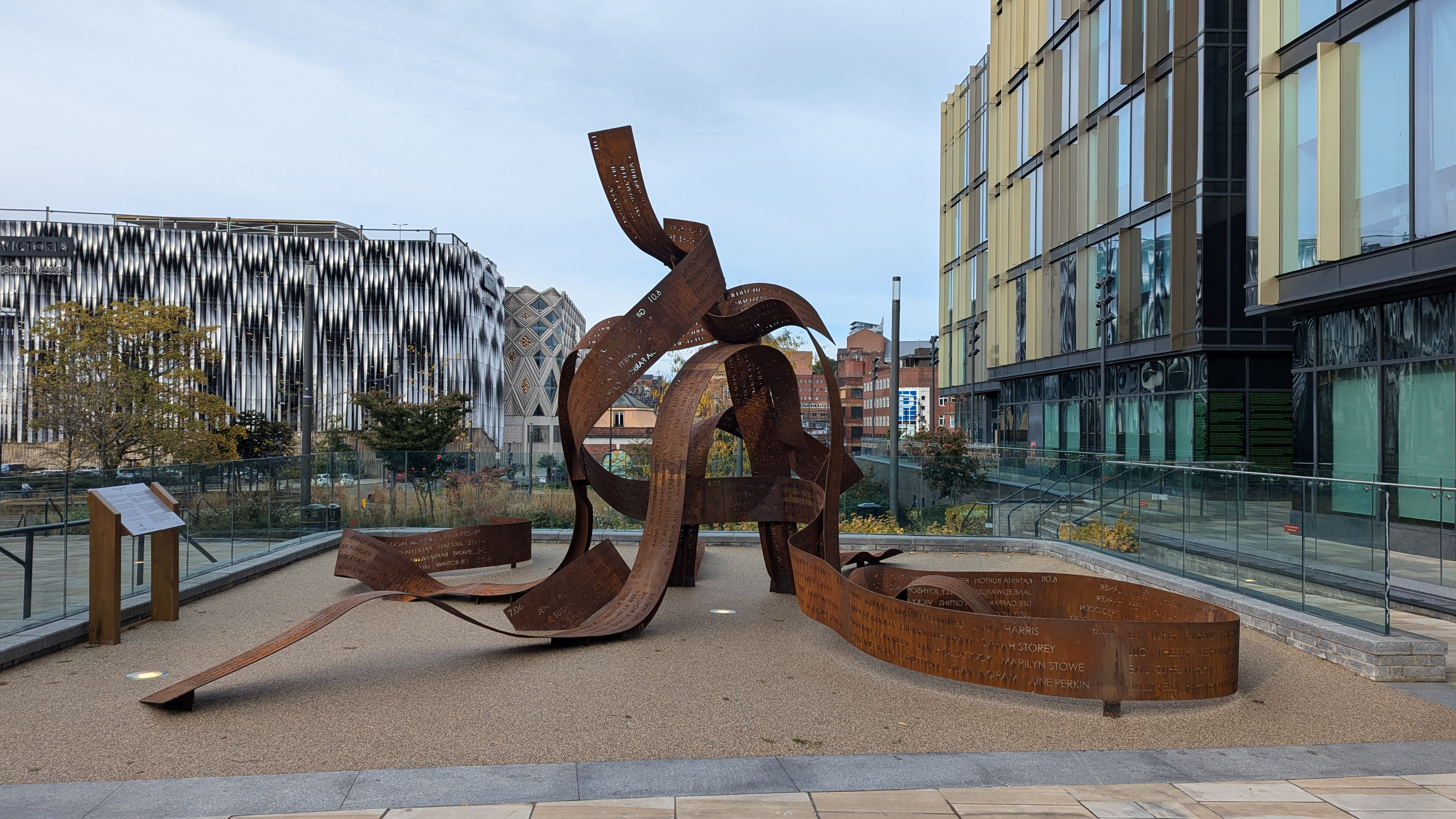
Ribbons sculpture by Pippa Hale

In 2021, she was named Up and Coming Wikimedian of the Year by Wikimedia UK. In 2022, she was UK Wikimedian of the Year.

In 2024, she was one of several hundred women in Leeds recognized on a public sculpture called Ribbons by Pippa Hale.

In 2026, Moore received a Wikipedia Silver Jubilee Award, one of five awards issued in London to mark the twenty-fifth anniversary of Wikipedia and fifteenth anniversary of Wikimedia UK as a registered charity.

== Personal life ==
Moore lives in Leeds.

== Select publications ==
- Allfrey, F., Moore, L. & Nevell, R. 2024. 'Forging the medieval on Wikipedia'. Postmedieval 15. 549–580. doi:10.1057/s41280-024-00321-6
- Nevel, Richard, and Lucy Moore. 2024. 'Wikipedia and Archaeology', in The Routledge Handbook of Archaeology and the Media in the 21st Century. Routledge. 2024. 195-213.
- Carruthers, W., Niala, J.C., Davis, S., Challis, D., Schiappacasse, P.A., Dixon, S., Milosavljević, M., Moore, L., Nevell, R., Fitzpatrick, A. and Abd el Gawad, H. 2021. 'Inequality and Race in the Histories of Archaeology', Bulletin of the History of Archaeology 31(1). 1-19.
