= RAF Cottam =

Royal Air Force base in Yorkshire, England

RAF Cottam
- Langtoft, East Riding of Yorkshire in England
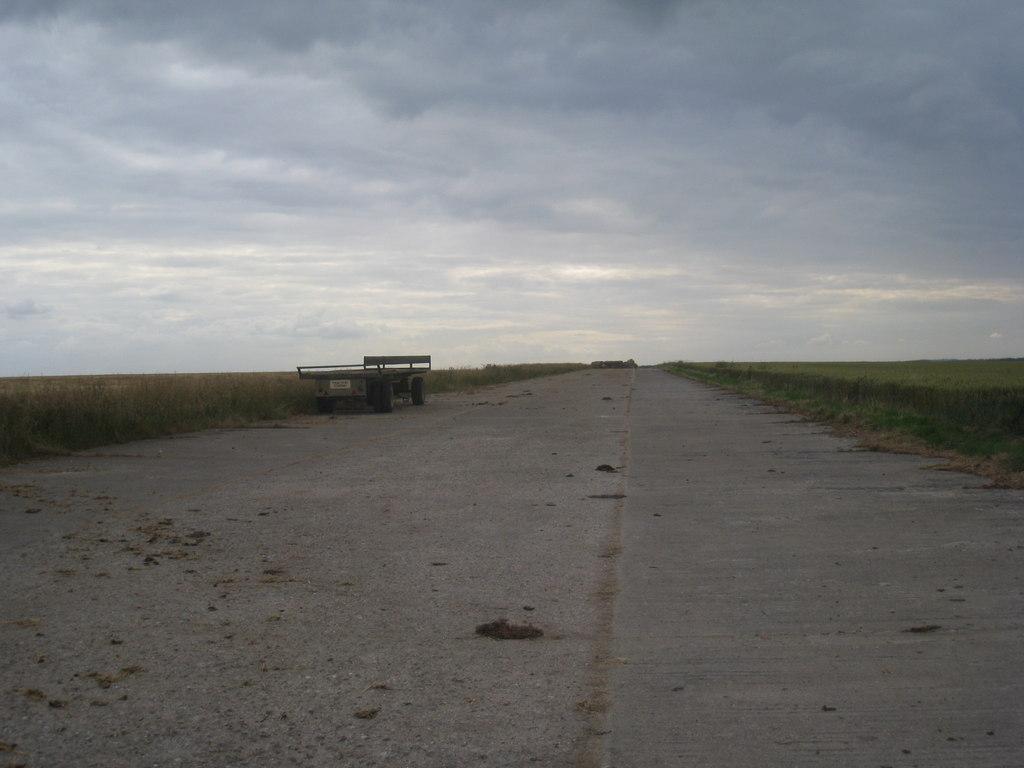
- Disused runway

Site information
- Type: Royal Air Force satellite station
- Owner: Air Ministry
- Operator: Royal Air Force
- Controlled by: RAF Maintenance Command

Location
- Shown within East Riding of Yorkshire RAF Cottam (the United Kingdom)
- Coordinates: 54°03′48″N 000°28′59″W

Site history
- Built: 1939
- In use: 1939 - 1954
- Battles/wars: European theatre of World War II

Airfield information
- Elevation: 150 metres (492 ft) AMSL
Runways
Direction	Length and surface
00/00	1,610 metres (5,282 ft) Concrete and Wood chips
00/00	1,230 metres (4,035 ft) Concrete and Wood chips
00/00	1,210 metres (3,970 ft) Concrete and Wood chips

Royal Air Force Cottam or more simply RAF Cottam is a former Royal Air Force satellite station near Cottam in the East Riding of Yorkshire, England and 3.9 miles (6.3 km) north west of Driffield, East Riding of Yorkshire. The airfield was used only occasionally for flying, mostly being utilised as a bomb storage site.

== History ==
Despite being built as a bomber airfield as a satellite to RAF Driffield, poor weather conditions meant it was never used as its intended use as operational airfield, though some flying did occur. The site was constructed with three runways measuring 5,280 feet (1,610 m), 4,050 feet (1,230 m), and 3,960 feet (1,210 m). The airfield was used temporarily as a dispersal site in August 1940 after a devastating raid on RAF Driffield. An attack by up to 30 Junkers Ju 88's saw 169 bombs dropped, 13 personnel killed, 12 Armstrong Whitworth Whitley bombers destroyed, and as a result of the raid, Driffield was non-operational for the rest of 1940. Cottam's watch office was demolished in 1980. The airfield operated until June 1954.

The airfield was then used by RAF Maintenance Command as No. 91 Maintenance Unit RAF (MU) used the runways and buildings for bomb storage, until the 1950s. In December 1944, the station was listed as having 1,057 and 188 women from Maintenance Command and No. 42 Group billeted there.

== Current use ==
The airfield is currently farmland with little remaining buildings spread over the entire site and the dispersed areas, however the traces of the runways and dispersals can be seen from the air. Ordnance Survey mapping from 1982 shows that the main north east/south west runway had been removed by that time.

RAF Cottam has a unique claim to fame as the 'virtual' airfield for RAF Air Traffic Controller as well as Flight Operations simulator training at RAF Shawbury.

== Units ==
Unit	Dates	Details	Ref
No. 4 Group Target Towing Flight	September–October 1940	Based at nearby RAF Driffield, a detachment flew from here using Lysander aircraft	
No. 91 Maintenance Unit	1946–1954		
No. 244 Maintenance Unit	September 1944–December 1945	Transferred in from RAF Connel in autumn 1944	
