= St Mary's Church, Cowlam =

Church in the East Riding of Yorkshire, England

Coordinates: 54°04′35″N 0°31′30″W

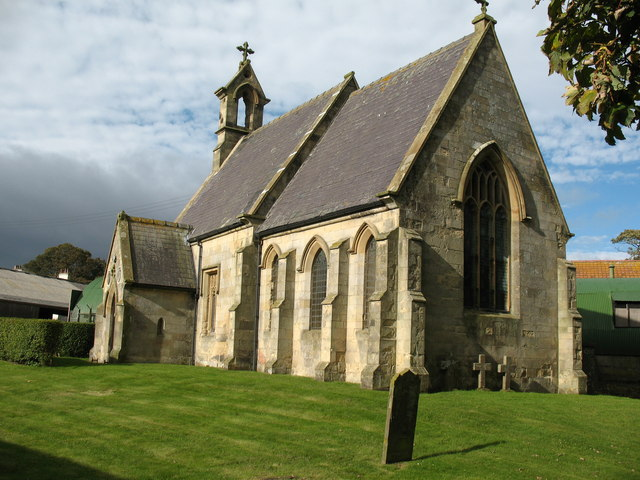
The church, in 2008

St Mary's Church is an Anglican church in Cowlam, a hamlet in the East Riding of Yorkshire, in England.

The church was built in the 12th century. It was largely rebuilt in 1852, part of a group of churches with work funded by Tatton Sykes. Uniquely, it was designed by his daughter, Mary Sykes. The building was grade II listed in 1966. It was long thought to date entirely from the 19th century, but in 2004 the discovery of a fragment of a mediaeval wall painting suggested it had instead been substantially altered. Access to the church is through a working farm and in 2017 it was threatened with closure. By 2026 it was in need of major repairs, but still hosted a monthly church service.

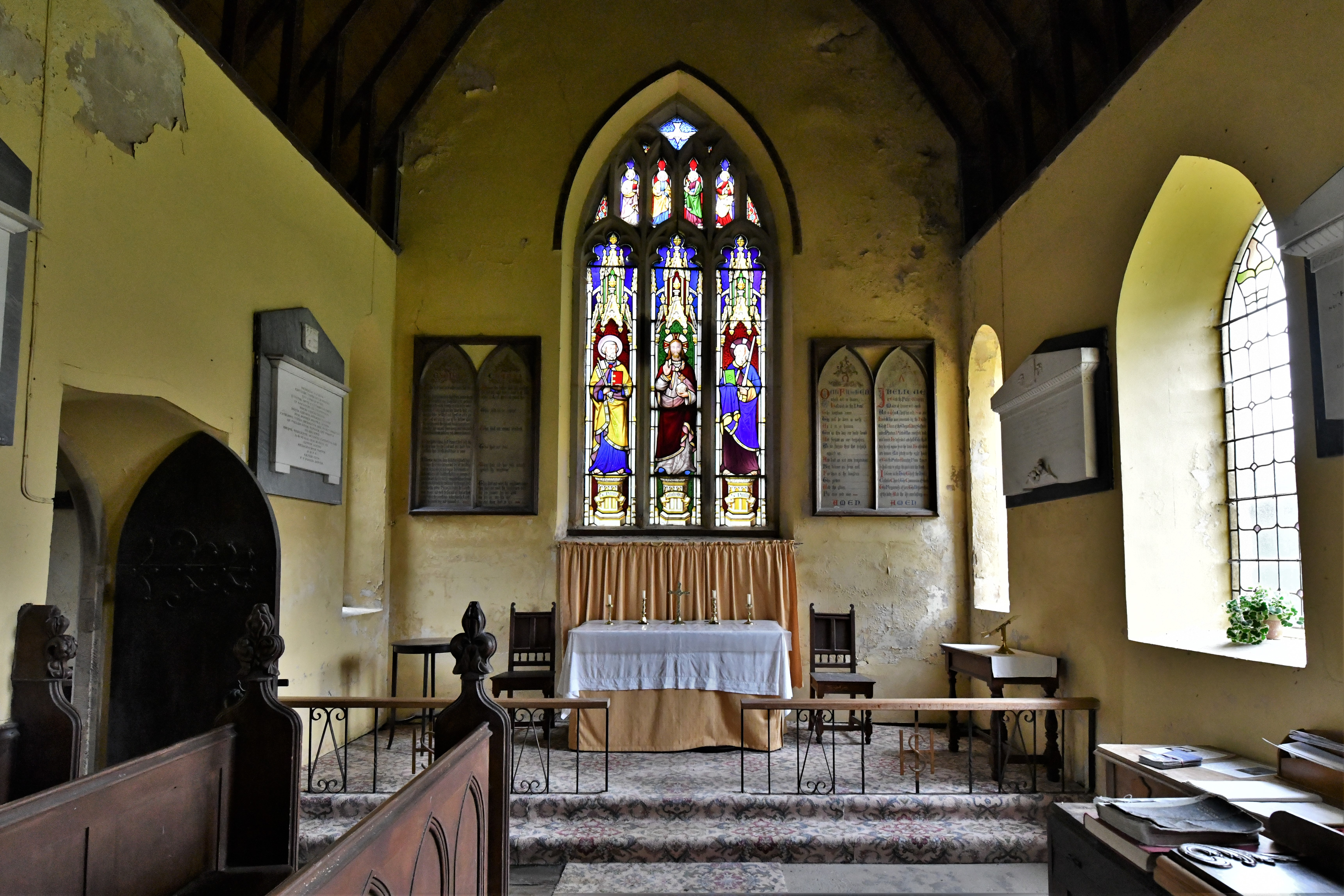
The chancel

The church is built of sandstone with a Welsh slate roof. It consists of a nave, a south porch and a chancel with a north vestry. At the west end are angle buttresses, and a lancet window with a moulded hood mould, above which is a quatrefoil, and on the gable is a bellcote with ogeed trefoil openings, surmounted by a cross. Inside, there is a Norman tub font with rich but crude carving, and a marble wall tablet carved by Francis Leggatt Chantrey.

== See also ==
- Listed buildings in Cottam, East Riding of Yorkshire
