= Listed buildings in Cottam, East Riding of Yorkshire =

Cottam is a civil parish in the county of the East Riding of Yorkshire, England. It contains two listed buildings that are recorded in the National Heritage List for England. Both the listed buildings are designated at Grade II, the lowest of the three grades, which is applied to "buildings of national importance and special interest". The parish contains the hamlets of Cottam and Cowlam and the surrounding countryside, and the listed buildings consist of a farmhouse and a church.

== Buildings ==
Name and location	Photograph	Date	Notes
Cottam House; 54.06878°N 0.48292°W		Late 18th century	The farmhouse is in pinkish-brown brick, with dressings in red brick and stone, a wooden modillion eaves cornice on the main block, and stepped eaves on the wings, and a pantile roof, with stone copings, some with shaped kneelers. The main block has three storeys and five bays with a double-depth plan, and there are flanking two-storey single-bay wings. The central doorway has pilasters and a fanlight, and most of the windows are sashes.
St Mary's Church, Cowlam; 54.07642°N 0.52507°W		1852	The church is in sandstone with a Welsh slate roof. It consists of a nave, a south porch and a chancel with a north vestry. At the west end are angle buttresses, and a lancet window with a moulded hood mould, above which is a quatrefoil, and on the gable is a bellcote with ogeed trefoil openings, surmounted by a cross.
