= Dawn Hadley =

Archaeologist and lecturer

Professor Dawn Hadley FSA
- Born: 1967 (age 58–59)
- Occupations: Archaeologist; historian; professor

Academic background
- Education: Birmingham University (PhD)

Academic work
- Discipline: Archaeology; Anglo-Saxons; Medieval history
- Institutions: University of Sheffield; University of York
- Doctoral students: Lucy Moore

Dawn Marie Hadley FSA (born 1967) is a British historian and archaeologist, who is best known for her research on the Anglo-Saxon and Viking Age periods, the study of childhood, and gender in medieval England. She is a member of the Centre for Medieval Studies and the department of archaeology at the University of York.

== Biography ==
=== Education and career ===
Born in Walsall, Hadley studied Modern History at the Universities of Hull and Birmingham. She was a temporary lecturer in History at the University of Leeds. In 1996, Hadley was hired by the University of Sheffield as a lecturer. From 2009 to 2018, Hadley was a professor at the university. She served as faculty director of postgraduate studies from 2009 to 2013. She was promoted to head of department in 2014. She also was acting vice-president for arts and humanities at the university from 2017 to 2018.

Hadley joined the University of York in 2018. She has written several publications on Anglo-Saxon culture and society and Viking-Age history. Her primary research focus is the study of childhood, gender, migration, and funerary rituals. Hadley is Director of White Rose College of Arts and Humanities, Universities of Leeds, Sheffield, and York.

=== Current research ===
Hadley's most recent research includes contributions to The Rothwell Charnel Chapel Project, the Sheffield Castle project and Tents to Towns: the Viking Great Army and its Legacy project. Hadley, along with Jennifer Crangle and Elizabeth Craig-Atkins (University of Sheffield), led the Rothwell Charnel Chapel Project’, which focuses on the 13th century charnel chapel at Holy Trinity Church, in Rothwell, Northamptonshire. The below-ground chapel house contains one of two remaining medieval ossuaries in England.

Hadley co-directs the "Viking Torksey project" on the 9th century Viking winter camp at Torksey, Lincolnshire with Prof. Julian Richards, and its extension Tents to Towns. Building on the late Mark Blackburn's identification and characterisation of the site, the new project focused on the legacy of the Viking army in the area, its interaction with the local community, the development of Anglo-Saxon towns, and the changing nature of commerce during the Anglo-Saxon period at Torksey. Hadley has co-authored a new book with Prof. John Moreland (University of Sheffield) on Sheffield Castle, which was destroyed (slighted) during the English Civil War. The book is based on the research project led by Hadley and Moreland on previous excavations of the castle site.

== Media ==
From 1998 to 2010, Hadley appeared on five episodes of the British TV series, Time Team. She also appeared as herself in the TV Movie Documentary, Saxon Hoard: A Golden Discovery in 2012.

== Awards and honours ==
In November, 2006, Hadley was elected a Fellow of the Society of Antiquaries of London.

== Selected publications ==
=== Books (authored) ===
- Hadley, D. M. (2000). The Northern Danelaw: Its Social Structure c. 800-1100. Leicester University Press. ISBN 978-0-7185-0014-6.
- — (2001). Death in Medieval England: An Archaeology. Tempus. ISBN 9780752414706.
- — (2007). The Vikings in England: Settlement, Society and Culture (Manchester Medieval Studies). Manchester University Press. ISBN 978-0719059827.
- — (2020). Sheffield Castle: Archaeology, Archives, Regeneration, 1927-2018 (White Rose University Press). White Rose University Press. ISBN 978-1-912482-28-3.
- —; Richards, J.D. (2021). The Viking Great Army and the Making of England. Thames and Hudson. ISBN 978-0500022016.

=== Books (editor) ===
- —; Dyer, Christopher, eds. (2017). The Archaeology of the 11th Century: Continuities and Transformations (The Society for Medieval Archaeology Monographs). Routledge. ISBN 978-1138201156.
- Crawford, Sally; ——; Shepherd, Gillian, eds. (2018). The Oxford Handbook of the Archaeology of Childhood (Oxford Handbooks). Oxford University Press. ISBN 978-0199670697.
- —; Richards, Julian D., eds. (2000). Cultures in Contact: Scandinavian Settlement in England in the Ninth and Tenth Centuries. Brepols Publishers. ISBN 9782503509785.

=== Journal papers ===
- — (2000). "Burial practices in the northern Danelaw". Northern History. 36 (2): 192–216.
- —; Buckberry, Jo (2007). "An Anglo-Saxon Execution Cemetery at Walkington Wold, Yorkshire". Oxford Journal of Archaeology. 26 (3): 309–329. doi:10.1111/j.1468-0092.2007.00287.x. hdl:10454/677.
- — (2008). "Warriors, Heroes and Companions: Negotiating Masculinity in Viking-Age England". Anglo-Saxon Studies in Archaeology and History. Vol. 15. pp. 270–284. doi:10.2307/j.ctvh1dw9r.10.
- —; Hemer, K.A. (2011). "Microcosms of Migration: Children and Early Medieval Population Movement". Childhood in the Past. 4 (1): 63–78. doi:10.1179/cip.2011.4.1.63. S2CID 126871923.
- Crewe, V.A.; —— (2013). "Uncle Tom was there, in crockery': Material Culture and a Victorian Working-class Childhood" (PDF). Childhood in the Past. 6 (2): 89–105. doi:10.1179/1758571613Z.0000000008.
- —; Richards, J.D. (2018). "In search of the Viking Great Army: Beyond the Winter Camps". Medieval Settlement Research. 33: 1–17.
- —; et al. (2019). "Charnel practices in medieval England: new perspectives" (PDF). Mortality. 24 (2): 145–166. doi:10.1080/13576275.2019.1585782. S2CID 182735588.
