= Cottam, East Riding of Yorkshire =

Coordinates: 54.068375°N 0.481665°W

Cottam
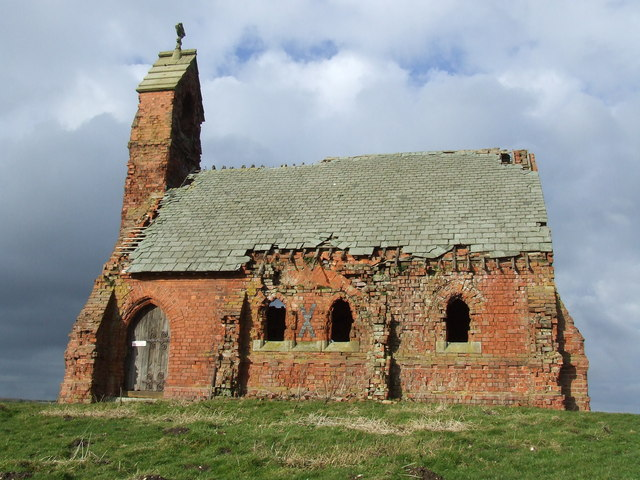
- Cottam Church of the Holy Trinity

- Location within the East Riding of Yorkshire
- Population: 108 (2011 census)
- OS grid reference: SE994646
  - London: 175 mi (282 km) S
- Civil parish: Cottam
- Unitary authority: East Riding of Yorkshire
- Ceremonial county: East Riding of Yorkshire
- Region: Yorkshire and the Humber
- Country: England
- Sovereign state: United Kingdom
- Post town: DRIFFIELD
- Postcode district: YO25
- Dialling code: 01377
- Police: Humberside
- Fire: Humberside
- Ambulance: Yorkshire
- UK Parliament: Bridlington and The Wolds

Cottam is a hamlet and civil parish in the East Riding of Yorkshire, England. The hamlet is west of the B1249 Skipsea to Staxton road, and in the Yorkshire Wolds. It is 16 miles (30 km) north from the county town of Beverley, and approximately 4 miles (6 km) east from the village of Sledmere.

The civil parish is formed by the hamlet of Cottam, and Cowlam 2.5 miles (4 km) to its north-west. According to the 2011 UK census, Cottam parish had a population of 108, an increase on the 2001 UK census figure of 74, which was the lowest population figure of any East Riding of Yorkshire civil parish in 2001.

== History ==
According to A Dictionary of British Place Names, Cottam derives from the Old English 'cot' (plural: cotum), meaning "a place at the cottages or huts". In the Domesday Book of 1086 the manor is written as 'cottun'. Cottam was in the Hundred of Toreshou, of nine geld units—taxable units assessed by hide area—and contained five ploughlands. In 1066 the lordship was held by Ulf of Carlton, who held sixteen manors in the north of Yorkshire, transferred in 1086 to the Archbishop of York, Thomas of Bayeux, who was also Tenant-in-chief to king William I.

Cottam was previously an Anglo-Scandinavian medieval village that was deserted. All that remains today is the now derelict Church of Holy Trinity which was rebuilt in 1818 and again c. 1890. The font of the first Norman church on the site is now in Langtoft church.

In 1823, Baines recorded that 'Cotham' was in the parish of Langtoft, the wapentake of Dickering, and the liberty of St Peter's, and noted a chapel of ease to the parish church at Langtoft. The population of sixteen included a curate and a gentleman farmer.

RAF Cottam was built as a bomber airfield in the Second World War but was never used for flying. Later the runways were used for bomb storage and the buildings were demolished in 1980.

== See also ==
- Listed buildings in Cottam, East Riding of Yorkshire
