= Natalia Gulkina =

Russian singer (born 1964)

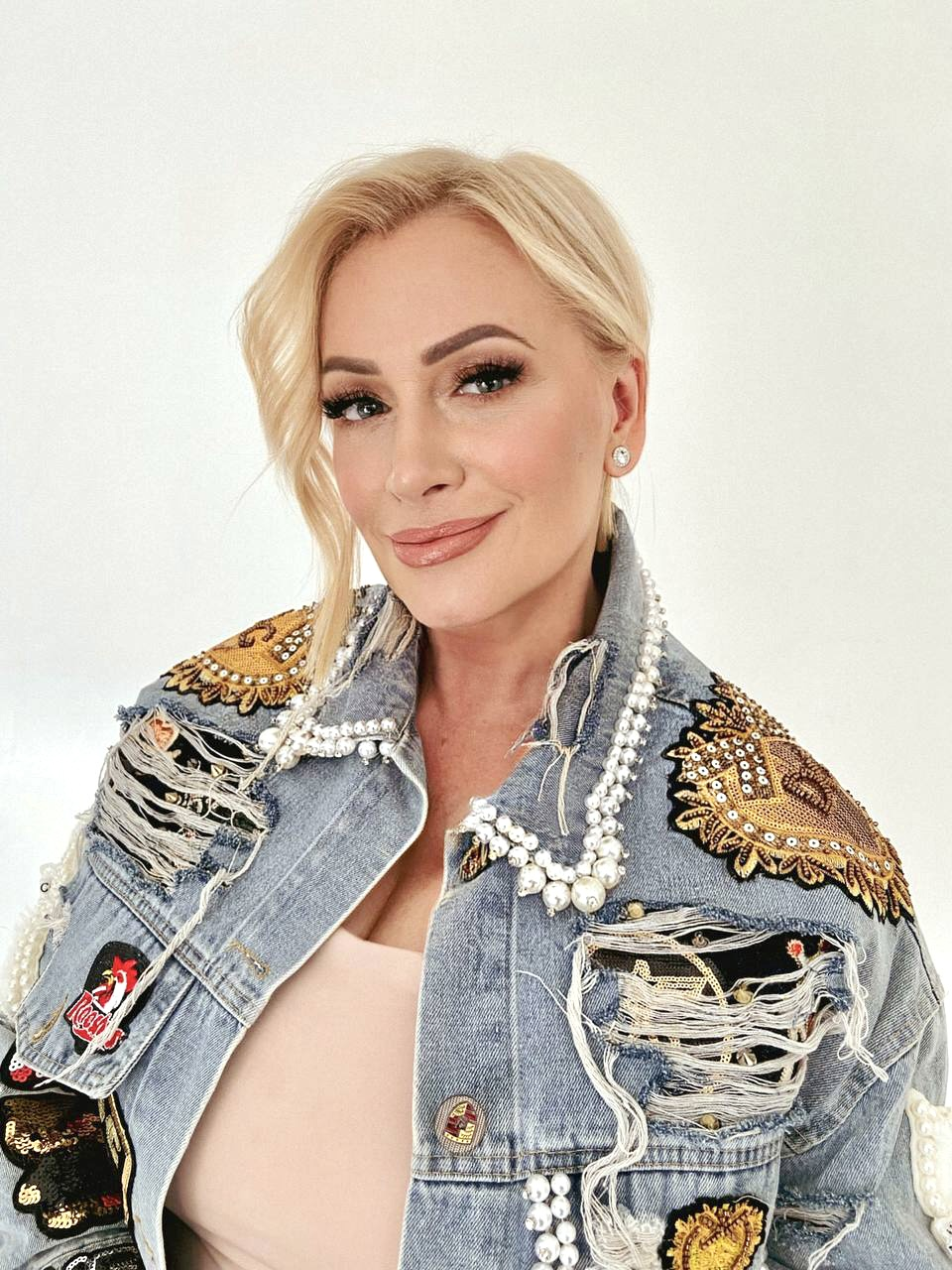

Background information
- Born: Natalia Valeryevna Klyarenok; 20 February 1964 (age 62)
- Origin: Moscow, USSR
- Genres: Pop, rock
- Occupations: Singer, actress
- Years active: 1986–present
- Website: gulkina.ru

Natalia Valeryevna Gulkina is a Russian singer and actress.

== Biography ==
=== 1964-1986: Childhood and youth ===
Born in Moscow. She studied well at school, but was not distinguished by exemplary behavior. Natalia began to practice singing, taking an example from her father. Having learned to play the guitar, she began to compose songs herself, which she sang in friendly companies, pioneer camps, at graduation parties. Won competitions.

She married Nikolai Gulkin early and gave birth to a son Alexey at the age of 20.

=== 1986-1988: Mirage Group ===
Mirage (group) Studying vocals in a jazz studio, I dreamed of entering the professional stage. Svetlana Razina, one of the participants of the studio, introduced Gulkina to the young composer and keyboardist Andrey Lityagin. At that time, he was looking for a new vocalist for the Mirage collective, since Margarita Sukhankina, who took part in the recording of three compositions "Stars are waiting for us", "Video" and "This Night", refused to participate in the recording of the rest of the material for the future album, because she intended to make an opera career at the Bolshoi Theater and did not want to be seen in a group performing pop music. Lityagin suggested Natalia to record some songs.

Gulkina performed vocal parts for five songs: "Sunny Summer", "Crazy World", "I Don't Want", "Electricity", "Magic World"

=== 1988-1992: The group "Stars" ===
In 1988, Mirage was preparing the release of the second album "Together again", which Gulkina insisted on creating. At this time Natalia toured the country with the band. Lityagin, in order not to distract the singer, again invited Sukhankina to record, with whom the album was recorded. Natalia was offered to learn songs and perform them under the soundtrack of Margarita. Gulkina refused and left the Mirage group, deciding to start a solo career.

"Probably the first time I left Mirage because I had to try my own hand," Natalia said. - "Yes, and the circumstances in the group developed that pushed me to such a decision. Then several band members went on tour at the same time, which, of course, could not please me. Besides, I found out that I earn less than the other soloists. I thought it was unfair and left. By that time I was already quite popular, so it was easier for me to start my new path."

The singer did not understand legal issues and continued to perform those songs of "Mirage", which she performed as a soloist of the group. Soon, however, the organizers of the group forbade her to do this.

"I didn't worry too much about it," Gulkina said, "but I took and wrote the song "The Sun is Burning", which was immediately picked up by various radio stations. Soon she became a hit, and I started touring the country with her. Then there was a new song "I believe and I love"".

At the same time, Natalia got acquainted with Leonid Velichkovsky. He told her that he had a lot of interesting material, and invited Gulkina to watch it. Natalia liked Velichkovsky's music, and they recorded the album "The Little Prince", which included the song "The Sun is burning". The album was very popular. In Gorky Park, Moscow a team concert was held in connection with the celebration of the City Day, which the TV crews of the American channel MTV came to shoot. The Mirage group was invited to perform at it with Tatiana Ovsienko, "Fairy" with Svetlana Razina and Natalia Gulkina.

"Until that moment, our group didn't have a name at all," Gulkina recalled." - We were announced as Natalia Gulkina - "Ex-Mirage" or simply Natalia Gulkina. And then we grabbed our heads — what should we call ourselves? There can't be two "Mirage" or "Mirage" and ex-"Mirage" on the stage. They began to come up with some names on the move. And at this time, the MTV crew enters the dressing room. I am presented to them as a Russian star, or rather, a star of the USSR, and they let's ask what I have, since I am a star. And my husband, now deceased, Kostya Terentyev, suddenly starts telling them that I have my own train, on which my group and I travel all over the country. And that we also have a plane. And how he went to lie! I'm terrified. What is he talking about?! And he just wanted to show that we are not worse than their stars. And suddenly one of us has an idea, what if we call our group "Stars". At first I doubted that we would call ourselves stars — that we are so cool, or what? And then someone said, what does it have to do with cool or not cool. There's the moon and the stars. And they are already shouting to us: "Your exit! How to declare?!"Well, we waved our hand: "Announce: Natalia Gulkina and the group of Stars"".

At the same time, the band shot the first two videos for the songs "The Sun is burning" and "I Believe and love".

In 1989, the band released their second album "Disco", which gained huge popularity .

In 1990, after winning the Inter-Chance International festival, Natalia Gulkina went on tour to China, becoming in fact the first Soviet pop singer to perform in this country. In Beijinge about 20 thousand spectators gathered at the concert of "Stars" in the Sports Palace.

In 1991 Natalia Gulkina recorded two albums. The first of them is "You just have to dream", the songs for which were written by Sergey Lemoh on the words of Gulkina ("Ivanhoe", "This is China", etc., clips were shot on them) and Oleg Molchanov on the words Arkady Slavorosova. The second is the singer's solo album "Day Angel", the songs for which were written by Oleg Molchanov and Slavorosov. The singer took 9th place in the "Song of the Year" according to the "Moskovsky Komsomolets".

Since 1992, dancers have appeared in the "Stars", cooperation with choreographer Sergei Mandrik began. For several years, the dancers changed repeatedly, and by 1995 the quartet "Street Jazz" was determined: Sergey Mandrik, Maxim Nedolechko aka "Peps", Volodya Suvorov and Araik Martirosyan. Gulkina worked with this team until 2001.

=== 1993-2004: Solo career ===
In 1993 Natalia Gulkina founded the "New Generation" studio school for gifted children on the basis of the children's creativity center "Constellation". In the same year, the recording company ZeKo Records released her album "Holy Love" with the hits "Rio de Janeiro" and "Goodbye, love". In this and subsequent years, Gulkina performed concerts in Germany for a Russian-speaking audience.

In 1995, Natalia Gulkina entered GITIS at the Faculty of Pop Art, majoring in "Director of pop-mass spectacles" at the course of the People's Artist of Russia Andrey Nikolaev.

In 1996, the record company ZeKo Records released the album "Dancing City" with the hits "Albatross" and "Melody of Love". In the album, in addition to the works of Molchanov and Lemokh, there were songs by young authors - Rafael Safin and Lyubov Lyubovtsova. Director Andrey Shcherbakov shot a video for the title song "Melody of Love", in which the dancers of the Street Jazz collective took part. In December, Natalia Gulkina's solo concerts dedicated to the 10th anniversary of her creative activity took place at the Moscow Youth Palace. To participate in the show, the dance groups "Krim's" and "Shine" were invited, as well as pupils of the New Generation studio school.

In 1997, Gulkina transferred to the acting faculty of GITISa and began to study at the course of David Livnev. In the same and subsequent years, Natalia worked on a new album under the working title "Sail of Dreams", which was recorded by Tchaikovsky Grand Symphony Orchestra under the direction of V. I. Fedoseev and many musicians. This album was never released. In 1999 Natalia successfully graduated from GITIS, having received a diploma of a dramatic actress of theater and cinema.

In 2000, Gulkina recorded a remix of the song "Sunny Summer" from the first album "Mirage", for which a clip was shot by music video maker Viktor Konisevich. Racing driver Alexey Dudukalo, the champion of Russia in auto racing, took part in the shooting. At the same time, two more remixes were recorded for the songs "Mirage" — "I don't want" and "Mad World".

In 2001, to replace the Street Jazz collective, Gulkina began collaborating with the Mobius ballet, a collaboration with which lasted until January 2005.

In 2002 Natalia took part in the festival "Disco of the 80s", performing remixes of the songs "Sunny Summer", "Mad World" and "Disco".

In 2003, Gulkina tried to create a new group-the duo "Malta" and recorded two new songs, but soon returned to solo work.

=== 2004-2011: Duet with M. Sukhankina and the revival of "Mirage" ===
In 2004, Natalia Gulkina and Margarita Sukhankina recorded solo albums at the same time, and since Sukhankina had already left the Bolshoi Theater, one of the journalists concluded that they decided to unite. Gulkina had the idea to revive the Mirage group, having created a duet with Sukhankina, with whom she was not even familiar, although at one time they both participated in recording songs for the first album "Mirage". Natalia called Margarita, but she did not immediately agree to see her, because the offer seemed to her unpromising. Natalia recalled: ""I persuaded her: "Let's tell the truth — that it was you and me, Rita Sukhankina and Natasha Gulkina, and not someone else, who made the Mirage. That we recorded phonograms, to which a dozen aspiring singers sang in different parts of the country." Persuaded ..."".

The singers decided to join forces and record a common album. Natalia as a producer invited Sergey Lavrov, with whom she collaborated in "Stars", and introduced him to Margarita. The result of their joint activity was the song "Just a Mirage" and the single "Mirage of Love", which aroused great interest among the public. The words to the song were written by Gulkina herself, and the music was written by Vadim Zolotykh. Despite the dissatisfaction of the owner of the rights to the Mirage brand, Gulkina and Sukhankina continued their joint activities first under the name Solo, and then changed it to the Golden Voices of the Mirage group. The singers participated in the "Disco of the 80s" with a song from Natalia Gulkina's repertoire "Ivanhoe". In 2005, they released the album "Just a Mirage", and also shot a video for the song of the same name. Dance teams "WA", "Scotch", "VIP" took part in the project. In 2006, in the SCCZ "Russia" the concert of the Golden Voices of the Mirage group took place". The singers paid the composer To Andrey Lityagin for the right to perform his works.

In 2007 Natalia Gulkina and Margarita Sukhankina teamed up with Andrey Lityagin, reviving the group "Mirage". In the same year, the video for the song "A Thousand Stars" was filmed.

In 2008, Natalia Gulkina and Margarita Sukhankina took part in the television show NTV "Superstar 2008. The dream team" and became the winners of this project by the number of audience votes scored. Natalia played the roles of the Snow Maiden, the Witch, the Waitress and other characters.

On September 17, 2009, the new album of the Mirage group was released under the title "A thousand stars", in which Gulkina performed four songs solo and four more in a duet with Sukhankina. At the same time, a new clip of the band "The Night is Twinkling" was released.

In 2010, Natalia, as part of Mirage, took part in the opening ceremony of the Winter Olympic Games in Vancouver, Canada, where the group gave two concerts.

=== 2011 - modern period ===
In January 2011, Natalia Gulkina left the group "Mirage" due to disagreements with colleagues, resuming her solo career. Her place in the team was taken by Svetlana Razina. Natalia was banned from performing even those songs of "Mirage" in which she was a soloist. But Gulkina herself refused in principle to speak with them.

Natalia Gulkina has taken up new projects. In February, she gave her first solo concert at the Jazzman club, performing her famous hits "Disco", "Ivanhoe", etc. in jazz processing. On April 21, Natalia's new solo song "Your Name" was released. Starred in "The best movie-3" and the TV series "Baby" of the channel STS, in the musical "The Three Musketeers" to the music of Maxim Dunaevsky played the main role, presenting in the image of Queen Anne of Austria.

In 2012 Natalia Gulkina performed solo and in a duet with Svetlana Razina.

On November 28, the presentation of Natalia Gulkina's fifth solo album "By Itself" took place, the songs for which were written by Arsen Kasiev. Natalia appeared in a new look and new costumes of her own design, prepared for the release of the albumRussian Radio.

In December 2012 on the air "Russian Radio" Gulkina's new song "Falcon", written by Andrey Demidov, sounded. In early 2013, Maxim Rozhkov shot a video for this song, with which the singer wanted to perform at "Eurovision Song Contest", but another performer went to the contest.

In 2013, Natalia was preparing for the release of a new solo album with songs of her own composition recorded in jazz arrangements, as well as preparing a solo performance with original sets, costumes and choreographic productions called "Love is to blame for everything", where she was going to perform not only as a performer, but also as a director of the show.

In 2013, she held a number of concerts in Russia together with former colleagues in the "Mirage" Svetlana Razina and Roma Zhukov under the title "Stars of the 80s. Together again 25 years later." In January, Voronezh and Ryazan hosted the show "New Year with Retro FM Stars", which was attended by Roman Zhukov, Natalia Gulkina and Svetlana Razina. Natalia recorded a solo version of the song "Fly, Dream", as well as a remix of the same song. Together with Svetlana Razina, a remix of the song "You can't trust a woman" was created.

In March 2013 Natalia Gulkina supported the public "Movement against Cancer". March 29 at the Morozov Hall club in Tver Natalia Gulkina, Roma Zhukov and Svetlana Razina performed at the joint concert "Legends of Discos".

On April 7, Gulkina took part in the action for children "Knigohod", which was held at the Russian State Children's Library, took part in the "Angels of Spring" ball on April 21, organized by the Constellation of Children's Talents Charity Foundation in Korston Hotel Moscow.

In April, Gulkina again visited China with concerts. The tour in this country, as before, was a great success.

Natalia's performances took place in Germany and Turkey in May. On May 26, Gulkina received the first order from the Runway Charity Foundation - "For Creative Creation for the Benefit of Russia". Natalia Gulkina and Ruslan Alekhno performed at the "DISCO DACHA" party in the Leningrad Club on May 30 in Moscow. In May and June, Gulkina's song "Tears like Rain" took 1st place in the "People's Hit Parade" of Radio Radio Radio.

On June 12, Natalia Gulkina performed at the national concerts dedicated to Day of Russia at VVC and Poklonnaya Gora in Moscow. In the same month, she recorded a new song by Arsen Kasiev "SE LA VIE" together with the Shakhunts brothers. On June 29, Gulkina, together with Svetlana Razina and Roma Zhukov, performed at the City Day in Tver with the program "Legends of Retro".

On July 7, Gulkina participated in a concert dedicated to the City Day Sebezhand.

In the autumn and winter of 2013-2014 Natalia Gulkina took part in the program "Live sound" on the TV channel "Russia".

In October 2014, Natalia participated in the new project "I can" on the TV channel "Russia".

In 2015, Natalia released a new single "Clock", which included three songs - "Clock" (music and words by N. Gulkina), "Mad World" (music and words by N. Gulkina) and a remix of the song "Falcon" (music and words by A. Demidov). The presentation of the single took place on February 26 in the restaurant of the hotel "Corston" in Moscow. On this day Natalia also celebrated her birthday and presented the first designer collection of bags under her brand "GN".

At the beginning of 2016, Natalia Gulkina was the host of the project "I'm losing weight!" on the NTV channel.

In the autumn of 2016, Natalia Gulkina, with the assistance of Director Sofia Rotaru and head of the Kremlin Concert Sergey Lavrov, organized a large tour of Russia with original sets, costumes and choreographic productions, where she performed not only as a performer, but also as a director of the show.

In May 2019, Natalia Gulkina took part in a concert dedicated to the Founding Day of the City of St. Petersburg in the Frunzensky district.

In 2020, she was one of the hundred members of the jury in the second season of the project "Come on all together!".

In the spring of 2020, she performed as a Mirror Man in the Mask show as a special guest.

== Personal life ==
- 1st husband - Nikolai Anatolyevich Gulkin (born September 19, 1960).
  - Son - Alexey Nikolaevich Gulkin (born February 6, 1984) - composes and performs music that Natalia Gulkina calls "difficult".
- 2nd husband - Konstantin Viktorovich Terentyev (October 21, 1963 - April 7, 2006) - director Gulkina (during her marriage Natalia bore the surname of her spouse), concert director of the group "Stars", soloist of the group Sheriff from 1990 to 1994, 2002.
- 3rd husband - Sergey Mandrik - choreographer, artistic director of the ballet "Street Jazz", led the dance numbers of the participants "Factories of stars-7"
  - Daughter - Yana Sergeevna Mandrik (1999).
- 4th husband - Sergey Reutov - pediatrician.

== Discography ==
=== As part of the Mirage group ===
- "Stars are waiting for us (album)/" (1987)
- "A Thousand Stars (album)" (2009)

=== As part of the "Stars" group ===
- "My Little Prince" (Magnetoalbum) (1988):
  - "Intro"
  - "The sun is burning" (N. Bite — N. Gulkin)
  - "Believe in love" (Leonid Velichkovsky, N. Bite — N. Gulkin)
  - "No, I want..." (P Velichkovsky — N. Gulkin)
  - "You are a beautiful angel" (L Velichkovsky — N. Gulkin)
  - "I'm waiting" (L Velichkovsky — N. Gulkin)
  - "I'm not sad" (L Velichkovsky — N. Gulkin)
  - "Only with you" (Leonid Velichkovsky — N. Gulkin)
  - "My little Prince" (L Velichkovsky — N. Gulkin)
  - "You call" (L Velichkovsky — N. Gulkin)
  - "Night" (Leonid Velichkovsky — N. Gulkin)
- "Disco" (Releases)(1989):
  - "Intro"
  - "Disco (Music is)" (L Velichkovsky — N. Gulkin)
  - "The wind tell me..." (P Velichkovsky — N. Gulkin)
  - "Winter" (L Velichkovsky — N. Gulkin)
  - "Never (I'm tired)" (L Velichkovsky — N. Gulkin)
  - "The first letter (In a fabulous dream)" (L Velichkovsky — N. Gulkin)
  - "Old Park (I Remember)(Candles are extinguished)" (L Velichkovsky — N. Gulkin)
  - "The Sea (The Bird)" (L Velichkovsky — N. Gulkin)
  - "Starry love (Star world)" (L Velichkovsky — N. Gulkin)
  - "Music idol (Music again)" (L Velichkovsky — N. Gulkin)
- "It is only necessary to dream" (Releases) (1991)
  - "Intro"
  - "This is China" (S. Lemoh — N. Gulkina)
  - "Ivanhoe" (S. Lemoh — N. Gulkina)
  - "Liar-night" (O. Molchanov - A. Slavorosov)
  - "Day Angel (Angel of light)" (O. Molchanov - A. Slavorosov)
  - "Goodbye for ever" (S. Lemoh — N. Gulkina)
  - "We just have to dream (Dream)" (S. Lemoh - N. Gulkina)
  - "It's you (Code)" (O. Molchanov - A. Slavorosov)
  - "Dedication (To those who left)" (O. Molchanov - A. Slavorosov)
  - "The Night before Christmas" (O. Molchanov - A. Slavorosov)
  - "Conclusion"

Work with Konstantin Terentyev the Sheriff

| Official site

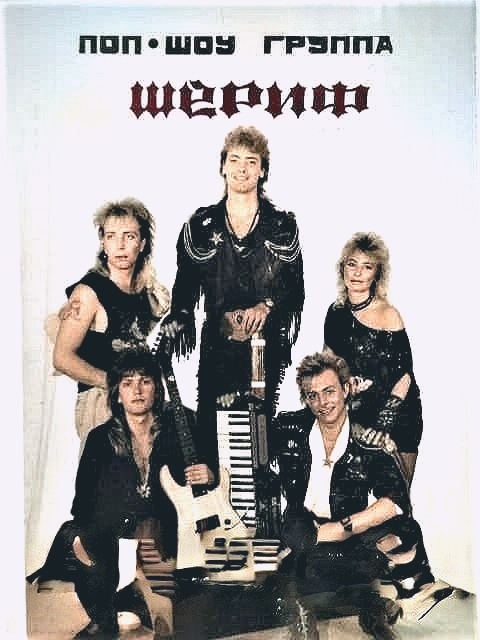
Sheriff (Russian Disco Band) 1990

- "Natali" (1990), "Julia" (1992), "Julia" (2002)
  - "Julia" (D. Bohlen — N. Gulkina)
  - "Don't go" (Terent'eva E. — N. Gulkina)
  - Natali (Terent'eva E. — N. Gulkina)
  - "Fast train" (Terent'eva E. — N. Gulkina)
  - "This day" (Terent'eva E. — N. Gulkia)
  - "Birthday"(Terent'eva E. — N. Gulkina)
  - "Warm rain" (Terent'eva E. — N. Gulkina)
  - "Where are you" (Terent'eva E. — N. Gulkina)
  - "Fairy forest" (Terent'eva E. — N. Gulkina)
  - "Dance Under the Moon" (Terent'eva E. — Terent'eva E., Terent'ev K.)

=== Solo creativity ===
- "Day Angel". Magnetoalbum (1991)
- "Holy Love" MS, CD, LP (1993)
- "You Just Have to Dream" LP (1993) CD (1994)
- "Disco" MS, CD (1995)
- "Dancing City" MS, CD (1996)
- "Sail of My Dreams", unreleased (1998)
- "Legends of Russian Disco" MS, CD (2000) - compilation
- «Sobranie /collectional edition/» CD (2003) - collection
- "The DISCO Queen" (2004) - compilation
- "Love Mood" (2004) - compilation
- "By myself..." (2012)
- "Se La Vie" (2014)
- "The Clock" (2015)

=== In a duet with Svetlana Razina ===
- "Mirages" song 2012 (author G. Phillips)
- "You can't trust a Woman" song 2012 (author S. Razin)
- "Fly, dream" song 2012 (author N. Gulkina)
- "You can't trust a woman" remix 2013 (author S. Razin)

"'DUETS'"

- Hurt (with Alexander Popov (ex - group "turbomode") (2014)
- Stay with me (with Tatiana Tretiak) (2016)
- Our spring (with Felix Carikati) (2016)
- It does not happen (with Roma Zhukov) (2017)
- Gasp feat ILLUS!'I (2018)

=== Musicals ===
- "The Three Musketeers", the role of Queen Anne of Austria, 2011.

=== In a duet with Margarita Sukhankina ===
- "'"Mirage of Love" single (2004)"'
- "'"Just a Mirage" album (2005)"'
- "Ivanhoe" (2004) (S. Lemoh — N. Gulkina)
- "New Year" (2004) (V. Zolotykh — N. Gulkina)
- "Moonlight Shadow" (2004)
- "Medley" (2004) (A. Lityagin - V. Sokolov)
- "Sunny summer" (2005) (A. Lityagin - V. Sokolov) with the group "Multfilms"
- "Tricky candy" (We are being watched) (2005) (E. Timofeev) with the group "Multfilms"
- "I don't ask anymore" (2005) (A. Lityagin - E. Stepanova)
- "The Stars are waiting for us" (2005) (A. Lityagin - V. Sokolov)
- "The Night is Coming" (2005) (A. Lityagin - V. Sokolov)
- "Music connected us" (2006) (A. Lityagin - V. Sokolov)
- "Together Again" (2007) (A. Lityagin - V. Sokolov)
- "Disco" (2005) (L. Velichkovsky — N. Gulkina)
- "I See You Again" (2007) (A. Lityagin - E.Stepanova)
- "Sunny Summer" (2007) (A. Lityagin - V. Sokolov)
- You're A SUPERSTAR, 2008.
  - Cinderella. with L. Senchina and M. Sukhankina
  - I will live. with M. Sukhankina, T. Ivanova and A. Apina.
  - I went crazy. with M. Sukhankina.
  - Adagio G- Minor. with M. Sukhankina. (T. Albinoni-S. Osiashvili)
  - Yes Sir, I Can Boogie. with M. Sukhankina.
  - Do you believe me or not. with M. Sukhankina. (A. Rybnikov).
  - Goodbye. with M. Sukhankina. (V. Dobrynin -L. Derbenev).
  - Just A Mirage. (V. Zolotykh — N. Gulkina) with M. Sukhankina.
  - "Music connected us." with M. Sukhankina. (A. Lityagin — V. Sokolov)
- Live Sound" 2013.

=== Video Clips ===
- The Sun is Burning (1988)
- My Little Prince (1989)
- Disco (1990)
- Ivanhoe (1991)
- This is China (1992)
- Melody of Love (1996)
- Sunny Summer (2000)
- Just a Mirage (together with Margarita Sukhankina) (2005)
- 1000 stars (as part of the Mirage group) (2008)
- The night is twinkling (as part of the Mirage group)(2009)
- New Year (2012)
- Falcon (2013)
- In the hubbub of the city (2015)
- Watch (2016)
- Eye to Eye (2017)
- Choking feat ILLUS!'I am (2018).
- You have me. (2018).
- A balloon flies into the sky. (2018)

== Awards ==
- International competition "INTERSHANCE" - GRAND PRIX (1990).
- Order from the Runway Charity Foundation — "FOR CREATIVE CREATION FOR THE BENEFIT OF RUSSIA" (2013).
