= Bánh bao bánh vạc =

Vietnamese dumpling

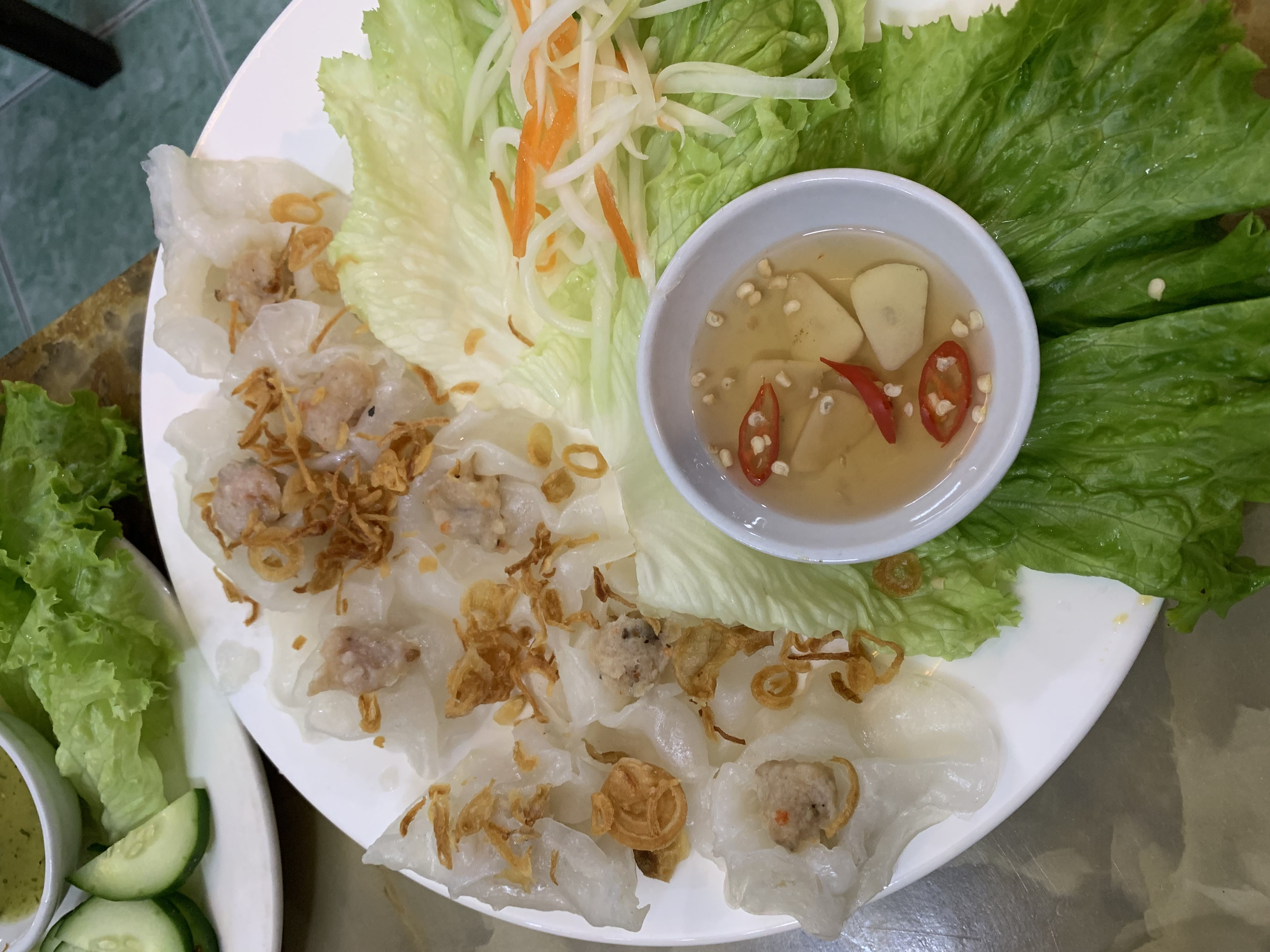
Bánh bao bánh vạc

Bánh bao bánh vạc (also called white rose dumplings) are a regional specialty of Vietnamese cuisine unique to Hội An. The rice paper is translucent and wrapped to resemble a flower shape (the origin of the name "white rose"). It is said to be made with water from a certain well in Hội An, hence this dumpling is not found anywhere else. The filling is prepared with a mix of shrimp, mushrooms, bean sprouts and spring onions. The dough is made by mixing rice flour with water and pounding the mixture in a mortar, and its preparation of the dough is rumored to be a family secret. The full meal bánh bao bánh vạc consists of seven bao style dumplings filled with shrimp paste, and three shell-shaped vac dumplings filled with shredded vegetables. The finished dish is topped with fried shallots and served with nước mắm chấm (sweetened fish sauce flavored with sugar, chillis, garlic and lime).

== Origins ==
The dish is said to have origins rooted in Chinese cuisine. Brought to Vietnam by the Hoa (Vietnamese of Chinese descent), the presentation of the dish is unique to Hội An where it is prepared by a single Chinese-Hoianese family.

The name "White Rose" dates back to the 1990s when it was coined by a French tourist to describe the appearance. It has since become the standard term used for the dish in the West.

== Customs ==
The dish is mostly served at restaurants that cater to tourists. When asked, local Hoianese have described the dish as "too expensive" and Chinese in origin. The dish is considered symbolic of the new identity of Hoianese-Chinese because it has not retained its distinct regional Chinese aspects (association with the regional Cantonese cuisine, Fukienese cuisine, Hainanese cuisine, etc.). Instead, it is associated with a general Hoianese-Chinese identity which has emerged as Chinese communities from different regions of China have assimilated into the Vietnamese culture, intermarried and adopted the Vietnamese language.
