= Cowlam =

Hamlet in East Riding of Yorkshire, England

Coordinates: 54°05′01″N 0°31′56″W

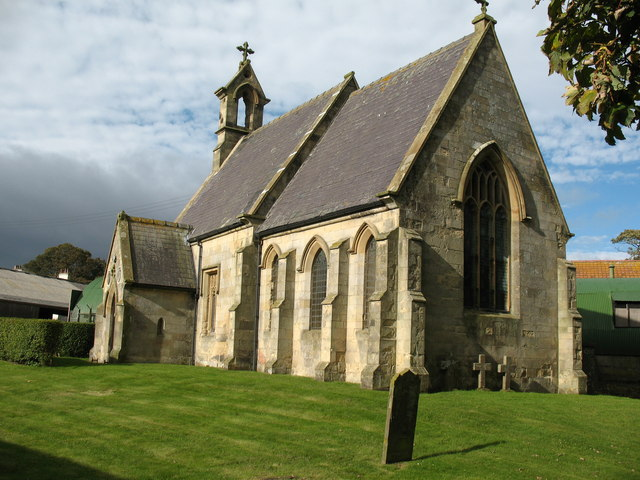
- St Mary's Church, Cowlam

- Location within the East Riding of Yorkshire
- OS grid reference: SE965655
  - London: 175 mi (282 km) S
- Civil parish: Cottam
- Unitary authority: East Riding of Yorkshire
- Ceremonial county: East Riding of Yorkshire
- Region: Yorkshire and the Humber
- Country: England
- Sovereign state: United Kingdom
- Post town: DRIFFIELD
- Postcode district: YO25
- Dialling code: 01377
- Police: Humberside
- Fire: Humberside
- Ambulance: Yorkshire
- UK Parliament: Bridlington and The Wolds

Cowlam is a hamlet in the civil parish of Cottam, in the East Riding of Yorkshire, England, and in the Yorkshire Wolds. The hamlet is on the B1253 Bridlington to North Grimston road, 17 miles (30 km) north from the county town of Beverley, 2 miles (3 km) east from the village of Sledmere, and 2.5 miles (4 km) north-west from the parish hamlet of Cottam. The hamlet contains eight houses and two farms.

== History ==
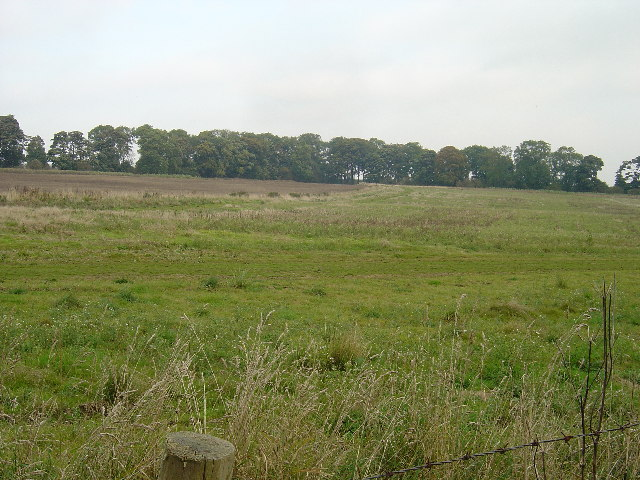
Site of the medieval village of Cowlam

The name Cowlam derives from the plural form of the Old Norse kollr meaning 'hilltop'.

Older names for the settlement were 'Colume' and 'Coleham', and the Domesday Book lists the manor as 'Colnun'. Cowlam in 1066 was in the Hundred of Toreshou, of eighteen geld units—taxable units assessed by hide area—and contained 5.6 households and three ploughlands. In 1066 the lordship was held by Ketilbert, who held thirteen manors in the north of Yorkshire. Cowlam was transferred in 1086 directly to king William I.

Cowlam was previously a Bronze Age encampment, evidenced by earthworks, 0.5 miles (0.8 km) from the hamlet, and a later medieval village that was deserted in the late 17th century.

In 1931 the civil parish had a population of 47. On 1 April 1935 the parish was abolished and merged with Cottam.

St Mary's Church, Cowlam is one of the churches on the Sykes Churches Trail. It is a small medieval church with a Norman font, and was restored in 1852 to a design by Mary E. Sykes, daughter of Sir Tatton Sykes, 4th Baronet. The living of the parish was held by the family of Barnard Foord Bowes. In 1966 the church was designated a Grade II listed building and is now recorded in the National Heritage List for England, maintained by Historic England.

== See also ==
- Listed buildings in Cottam, East Riding of Yorkshire
