= Sergei Romanovich =

Russian footballer

Personal information
- Full name: Sergei Ivanovich Romanovich
- Date of birth: 18 February 1984 (age 42)
- Height: 1.79 m (5 ft 10 in)
- Position: Forward

Youth career
- FC Spartak-2 Moscow

Senior career*
Years	Team	Apps	(Gls)
2001–2005	FC Sportakademklub Moscow	115	(14)
2005	FC Amur Blagoveshchensk	3	(0)
2006	FC Dynamo Vologda	21	(3)
2006	FC Sportakademklub Moscow	9	(0)
2007	FC Zvezda Irkutsk	11	(1)
2007	FC Mashuk-KMV Pyatigorsk	9	(0)
2008	FC MVD Rossii Moscow	26	(4)
2009–2010	FC Sportakademklub Moscow	29	(4)
2010	FC Podolye Podolsky district (amateur)		
2011	FC Yu.-M.-Spartak-2 Moscow		
2012	FC StArs Kolomensky District		
2013	FC Yu.-M.-Spartak-2 Moscow		
2013–2016	FC Chayka-Yubileyny Korolyov		
2016–2017	FC Solyaris Moscow	0	(0)
2017	FC Chayka-Yubileyny Korolyov		
2018	FC Prialit Reutov		
2018	FC Rosich Moscow		
2019	FC SSh #75 Moscow		
- * Club domestic league appearances and goals

Sergei Ivanovich Romanovich (Russian: Серге́й Иванович Романович; born 18 February 1984) is a Russian former professional football player.

== Club career ==
He played two seasons in the Russian Football National League for FC Amur Blagoveshchensk, FC Zvezda Irkutsk and FC Mashuk-KMV Pyatigorsk.
