= White Rose (band) =

- Origin: Bali, Indonesia
- Genres: Pop punk
- Years active: 2007z–2013, 2014–present
- Labels: Heartless Records
- Members: Surya Dipta; Ian Putra; Adi 'Goib' Krisna; Satria Priangga
- Past members: Gung Nandha; Riga Pradiska
- Website: www.whiterosepoppunk.com

White Rose is an Indonesian pop punk band from Denpasar, Bali, formed in 2007 and reformed again in 2014. They consist of guitarist and vocalist Surya Dipta, lead guitarist Ian Putra, bassist Adi 'Goib' Krisna, and drummer Satria Priangga. They have released the ‘Buktikan ‘Ku Bisa EP’ in 2012, and followed with their debut full-length album ‘Buka Mata Mereka’ in May 2015.

== Discography ==
=== Studio albums ===
- Buktikan 'Ku Bisa EP (2012, Self-released)
- Buka Mata Mereka (2015, Heartless Records)
- Sentimental (2018, H.M.V.U Collective Records)

=== Music video ===
- "Takkan Pernah Padam" (Buka Mata Mereka, 2015)
- "Nol Derajat" (Buka Mata Mereka, 2015)
- "Serenade" (Sentimental, 2018)

== Band members ==
=== Current members ===
- Surya Dipta – vocals, guitar (2007–present)
- Ian Putra – guitar (2014–present)
- Adi 'Goib' Krisna – bass guitar (2014–present)
- Satria Priangga – drums (2015–present)

=== Past members ===
- Gung Nandha – drums (2007–2015)
- Riga Pradiska – bass guitar (2007–2013)
