= Belye Rozy =

Song by Laskoviy Mai

from the album Belye Rozy
- A-side: "Belye Rozy"
- B-side: "Sedaya Noch"
- Released: 1989
- Recorded: 1988
- Genre: Eurodisco
- Length: 5:43 (Spotify)
- Label: Melodiya
- Songwriter: Sergey Kuznetsov
- Composer: Sergey Kuznetsov

"Belye Rozy" (Russian: Белые розы, White Roses) is a song by the Soviet group Laskoviy Mai. Both music and lyrics were written by Sergey Kuznetsov.

== Background ==
According to Kuznetsov, the song was written in 1986 while he was mildly intoxicated.

More than 25 years later, Kuznetsov stated that the roses in the song symbolise people who are discarded after being used.

Kuznetsov also claimed that the song was written the morning after the group’s first concert, held for New Year 1987. The group received its name “Laskoviy Mai” just before going on stage. The phrase “white roses” came to Kuznetsov on his way home, and he wrote the song in 15 minutes the next morning using a red pen. He stated in 2013 that the original manuscript survives. Yuri Shatunov, who first performed the song as the group’s lead vocalist, was 13 years old.

== Popularity ==
The music video debuted on Soviet Central Television in January 1989 on the programme Utrennyaya pochta (Morning Post). It had been filmed in late 1988. The song made the group an immediate nationwide sensation.

The song was also popular in Poland in the late 1980s. It gained renewed popularity in early 2008 after Polish singer Natasza Urbańska performed it during a New Year’s concert broadcast simultaneously on two major Polish TV channels. The song remains popular in Poland and is frequently played in restaurants.

Ukrainian group TIK released a Ukrainian-language version, "Bili troiandy", in July 2008.

In Russia, the song remains widely known and was voted for by viewers on an episode of Dostoyanie Respubliki on Channel One Russia in 2009.

Many artists have covered the song, including Mikhail Shufutinsky.

== Influence ==
A parody titled "White Goats" (Belye kozy) was recorded by Sergey Minaev and Vladimir Markin. A musical phrase from the song appears in a track by the group Serebryanaya Svadba.

In 2019, Dima Bilan released the song About White Roses, which references “Belye Rozy” and other late-1980s/early-1990s hits. It was later covered by Yuri Shatunov.

The B-side to "White Roses", "Grey Night" has been used in various Russian films and TV series, including I Am (2009) and The Boy's Word: Blood on the Asphalt. (2023)

== Track listing ==
7-inch vinyl single, 33⅓ rpm (Melodiya – С62 28083 003)

All songs written and composed by Sergey Kuznetsov.

Side A
No.	Title	Length
1.	"Belye Rozy (White Roses)"	5:48

Side B
No.	Title	Length
1.	"Sedaya Noch (Grey Night)"	6:55

== Charts ==
=== Year-end charts ===
Chart (1988)	Category	Position
Zvukovaya Dorozhka	Most popular songs of the year	10
Chart (1989)	Category	Position
TASS Hit Parade	Top 20 songs of the year	4
Zvukovaya Dorozhka	“Unpopular Song of the Year” nomination	1
