= Laskovyi Mai =

Soviet synth-pop band

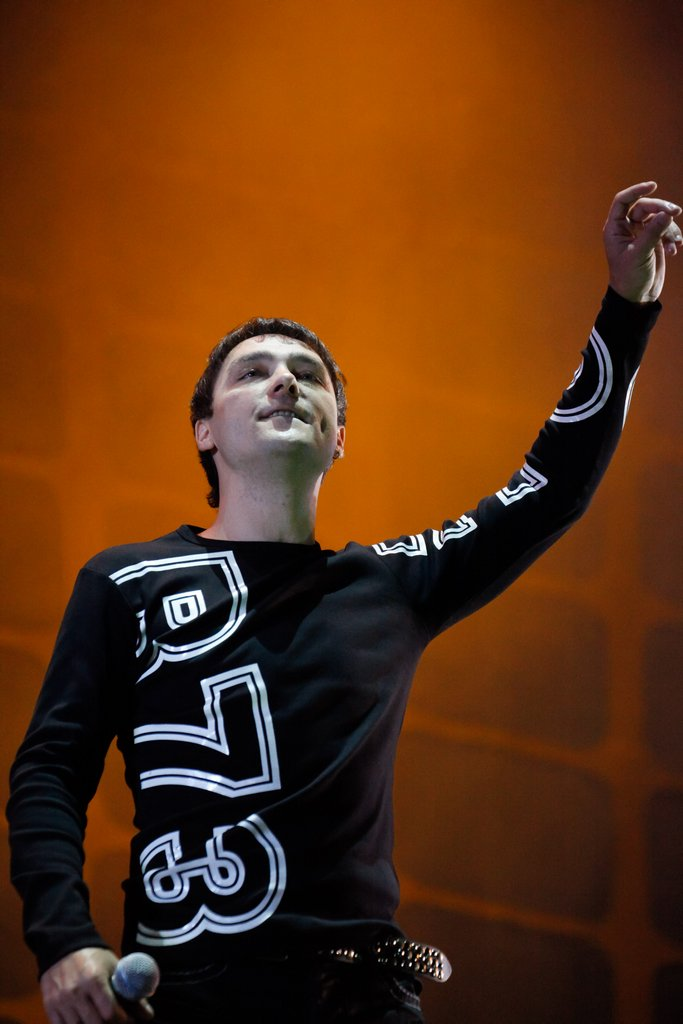

Background information
- Also known as: Laskovyi Mai
- Origin: Orenburg, Soviet Union
- Genres: Pop, rock, disco
- Years active: 1986–1992; 2009–present
- Members: Andrei Razin; Sergey Serkov; Andrei Kucherov; Sergei Lenyuk
- Past members: Sergei Kuznetsov; Yuri Shatunov; Vladimir Shurochkin

Laskovyi Mai (Russian: Ласковый май, lit. 'Tender May') is a Soviet boy band from Orenburg founded by Russian songwriter, composer and musician Sergei Kuznetsov. The group's best-known member was Yuri Shatunov, who subsequently went on to some solo success. The group disbanded in 1992. Laskovyi Mai once had been called "the legends of the 80–90s".

Laskovyi Mai was formed in the middle of the 1980s when Sergei Kuznetsov decided to create a group of musicians with orphan children from an orphanage in Orenburg.

== History ==
The band Laskovyi Mai (Tender May) was founded on 6 December 1986 at Orenburg Boarding School No. 2 by the school's music instructor Sergey Kuznetsov, musician Vyacheslav Ponomaryov, and thirteen-year-old student Yuri Shatunov as the lead vocalist.

By the time the New Year’s disco came around, the repertoire was ready. Only the name of the band was missing... On December 7th (again that number seven!), I suggested a name from one of the song lyrics. It sounded symbolic but somewhat sugary. None of us liked it, including me. “Laskovyi Mai.” The phrase came from a song line in “Leto” (“Summer”): “But tender May will come into its own...” We decided to keep it just temporarily, but in the end, the name stuck. About ten minutes before going on stage, we looked at each other — what should we call ourselves? Everyone looked at me. “Ah, let it be. Laskovyi Mai.”

— Sergey Kuznetsov, "Official website of Sergey Kuznetsov". kuziaart.ru. Archived from the original on 30 November 2021.

Later, Kuznetsov met Konstantin Pakhomov, and together they gave several concerts under the name Laskovyi Mai, even filling a stadium with 5,000 people.

== Popularity ==
Commercial success came to the group in 1988 after Arkady Kudryashov, who worked with Andrei Razin as an administrator for the band Mirage, discovered them. While on tour in Alma-Ata, Kudryashov accidentally heard the song Belye Rozy (“White Roses”). Impressed, he bought a cassette of the band's songs and brought it to Moscow. Although others dismissed the music as “primitive,” Kudryashov obtained contact information for the Orenburg musicians from a local acquaintance.

According to Andrei Razin, who had earlier been the first producer of Mirage, he later created multiple touring line-ups of Laskovyi Mai performing to Shatunov’s pre-recorded vocals. In 1988, Razin traveled to Orenburg to invite the original group to Moscow for professional studio recordings at SPM Records with producer Yuri Chernavsky. During these sessions, Kuznetsov insisted that the real Shatunov perform the vocals.

The core members were:

- Yuri Shatunov (lead vocalist)
- Konstantin Pakhomov
- Andrei Razin (from 1988, band leader)
- Musical director and composer Sergey Kuznetsov
- From 1989, composer Vladimir Boyko

The group lived and worked at Moscow Boarding School No. 24 on Kakhovka Street, where the “Laskovyi Mai Studio” was also located. Because Shatunov was still in school, Razin also recorded several of Kuznetsov’s new songs with his own vocals, becoming a full-fledged soloist and later the band’s manager.

Razin’s activity generated many controversies, one of which he tried to diffuse by spreading the rumor that he was Mikhail Gorbachev’s nephew. When the scandal over duplicate line-ups could no longer be hidden, Razin officially founded the Laskovyi Mai Studio, allowing him to create multiple “official” versions of the band.

The first manager of the group was Rashid Dairabayev. In 1989, after Kuznetsov’s departure, Razin appointed Vladimir Boyko, founder of the group Belye Rozy, as musical director. All tracks were re-recorded at the Rekord studios by sound engineer Anatoly Meshayev.

As the first Soviet teenage pop group performing in the Euro-disco style of the 1980s, Laskovyi Mai achieved unprecedented popularity among both youth (aged 13–18) and adults.

However, tensions between Razin and Kuznetsov escalated in 1989 over financial and creative disputes. Kuznetsov left, believing the group could not survive without him. After his departure, the quality of the group’s songs declined, though commercial success continued due to the multiple touring line-ups.

Between 1989 and 1990, Laskovyi Mai performed to packed stadiums (40,000–60,000 spectators) and set records for the number of concerts per day. During the winter holidays of 1989–1990, the band held 13 sold-out solo concerts at Moscow’s Luzhniki Olympic Complex with the program White Roses – in White Winter… Attendance across the Soviet Union reached up to eight concerts per day and over forty per month.

Although later attempts to recreate the success of White Roses and Pink Evening were less successful, Laskovyi Mai had a lasting influence on the development of Russian pop.

No one in Russia has yet managed to repeat the phenomenal success of Laskovyi Mai. According to some reports, every third Russian attended at least one of their concerts.

— Valeriya Ukolova, "Laskovyi Mai caught on film". Moskovsky Komsomolets. 24 October 2008. Archived from the original on 12 April 2019.

In November 2022, Sergey Malinkovich, the Chairman of the Communists of Russia political party, accused musician Andrey Razin of treason for selling the rights to the songs of Laskovyi Mai to an American company.

== Members ==
(Russian names in parentheses)

=== 1986–1992 period ===
Vocalists

- Yuri Shatunov (Юрий Шатунов) (died 2022)
- Andrei Razin (Андрей Разин)
- Andrey Gurov (Андрей Гуров)
- Anton Tokarev (Антон Токарев)
- Viktor Kulikov (Виктор Куликов)
- Vlada Moscovskaya (Влада Московская) (died 2006)
- Oleg Krestovsky (Олег Крестовский)
- Konstantin Pakhomov (Константин Пахомов)
- Vladimir Shurochkin (Владимир Шурочкин)
- Rafael Isangulov (Рафаэль Исангулов) – also keyboardist
- Yuri Barabash (Юрий Барабаш) (died 1996)
- Yuri Gurov (Юрий Гуров) (died 2012)
- Anna Kuznetsova (Анна Кузнецова) — founder, lyricist, composer, arranger, keyboardist (died 2022)

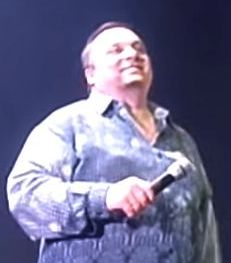
Vocalist Andrei Razin

Key staff

- Vladimir Boyko (Владимир Бойко) – musical director, composer
- Alla Goltseva (Алла Гольцева) – lyricist (for Razin, Shatunov, Krestovskiy and other soloists)
- Rashid Dayrabaev (Рашид Дайрабаев) – band's first director (died 2013)
- Arkady Kudryashov (Аркадий Кудряшов) – band administrator
- Anatoly Meshaev (Анатолий Мешаев) composer, arranger
- Natalia Grozovskii (Наталья Грозовская) – vocal group "Белые розы" "Belye Rozi" (meaning "White Roses") – after a famous song by the band
- Eugene Zakulaev (Евгений Закулаев) – deputy general director of the orphanage

Musicians

- Igor Anisimov (Игорь Анисимов) – main keyboardist of the first band (1986–1991)
- Alexei Burda (Алексей Бурда) – keyboards
- Alexander Priko (Александр Прико) – keyboards (died 2020)
- Evgeny Bychkov (Евгений Бычков) – keyboards
- Sergei Kulagin (Сергей Кулагин) – keyboards
- Arvid Yurgaytis (Арвид Юргайтис) – keyboards (died 2004)
- Mikhail Sukhomlinov (Михаил Сухомлинов) – keyboards (died 1993)
- Vyacheslav Ponomarev (Вячеслав Пономарёв) – bass guitar
- Igor Safiullin (Игорь Сафиуллин) – saxophone
- Igor Igoshin (Игорь Игошин) – drums, percussion engineer (died 1992)
- Sergei Lenyuk (Сергей Ленюк)- drums
- Sergei Kuznetsov (Сергей Кузнецов) — founder, lyricist, composer, arranger, keyboardist (died 2022)

Technicians

- Oleg Andreev (Олег Андреев) – sound engineer
- Alexander Egunov (Александр Егунов) – sound engineer
- Vladimir Hozyaenko (Владимир Хозяенко) – sound engineer
- Pavel Tomov (Павел Томов) – sound engineer

=== 2009 reformed band members ===
- Andrei Razin (Андрей Разин)
- Sergei Serkov (Сергей Серков)
- Andrei Kucherov (Андрей Кучеров)
- Sergei Lenyuk (Сергей Ленюк)

== Discography ==
- White Roses/Tender - 1 May (Russian: Белые розы/Ласковый май — 1) (1988)
- Autumn is slowly leaving/Tender - 2 May (Russian: Медленно уходит осень/Ласковый май — 2) (1988)
- A little about myself/Old Forest (Russian: Немного о себе/Старый лес) (1988)
- Broken Love (Russian: Разбитая любовь) (1988)
- 8 March (Russian: 8 марта) (1989)
- Pink Evening (Russian: Розовый вечер) (1989)
- On the roof (Russian: На крыше) (1989)
- Goodbye Baby (Russian: Гудбай, беби) (1989)
- Tender Summer (Russian: Ласковое лето) (1989)
- Fairy Shore (Russian: Сказочный берег) (1989)
- October Album (Russian: Октябрьский альбом) (1989)
- Stupid snowflakes (Russian: Глупые снежинки) (1990)
- Matryoshka Masha (Russian: Машка-матрёшка) (1990)
- Naughty girl (Russian: Озорная девочка) (1990)
- Come back (Russian: Возвращайся) (1990)
- Island for two (Russian: Остров на двоих) (1990)
- Close the door on me (Russian: Закрой за мной дверь) (1991)
- Chance Encounter/Younger Sister (Russian: Случайная встреча/Младшая сестрёнка) (1992)
- The Best (Russian: Лучшее) (1996)
- CPR (Russian: Искусственное дыхание) (1996)
- Legends #1 (Russian: Легенды #1) (2000)
- Legends #2 (Russian: Легенды #2) (2000)
- Legends #3 (Russian: Легенды #3) (2000)
- Star (Russian: Звезда) (2007)
- All hits (Russian: Все хиты) (2008)
- New songs (Russian: Новые песни) (2016)

== Feature film ==
In 2009, Russian film director Vladimir Vinogradov released his film titled Laskovyi Mai, a biographical drama film about the band's career.
