= White Rose College of the Arts & Humanities =

Partnership between the Universities of Leeds, Sheffield and York

The White Rose College of the Arts & Humanities (WRoCAH) is a doctoral training partnership between the Universities of Leeds, Sheffield and York, which are members of the White Rose University Consortium, formed in 2013.

WRoCAH funds doctoral research and provides training for postgraduate researchers in the arts and humanities at the three institutions through funding from the three universities and the Arts and Humanities Research Council, with support from 16 core partner organisations. Recipients collaborate between the three universities, present and discuss their research with the public and policy-makers, and complete a project with an organisation, intended as an introduction to working after completing the doctorate and a benefit to the organisation. As of December 2015, WRoCAH offered 50 openings per year to students from any European Union country; as of December 2017, it was funding more than 500 postgraduates.

== Core partners ==
=== Museums, galleries, archives and libraries ===
- The British Library
- The National Archives (United Kingdom)
- The National Media Museum
- The National Railway Museum
- The Royal Armouries
- The Victoria and Albert Museum

=== Arts and heritage organizations ===
- The Arts Council
- English Heritage

=== Creative industries ===
- CidaCo
- Continuum Attractions

=== Design, manufacturing and retail ===
- Marks & Spencer
- Microsoft

=== Publishing and performing arts ===
- Maney Publishing
- Opera North

=== Media ===
- Carm Productions and Strategy
- Reel Solutions

=== Charities and Public Sector ===
- Sheffield Health Partnership University NHS Foundation Trust
- The Young Foundation
