= Mirage (Russian band) =

Russian pop group

Mirage (Мираж)
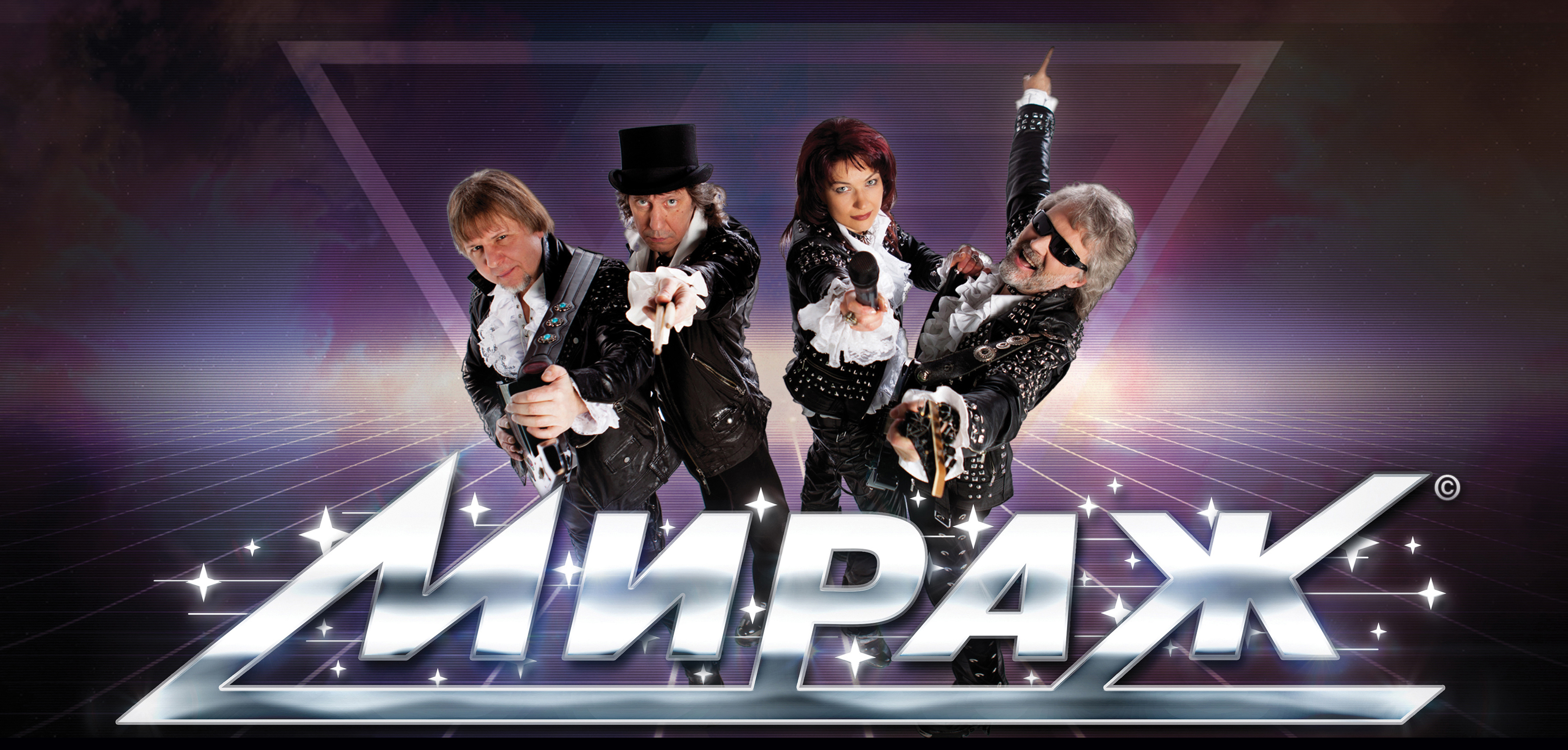

Background information
- Origin: USSR, Russia
- Genres: Euro disco, Eurodance, Italo disco, Eurobeat, hi-NRG
- Years active: 1986–present
- Label: Sound / Jam / Quad Disc
- Website: mirage-vocal.ru, mirage.su

Mirage (Russian: Мираж, romanized: Mirazh — Mirage) is a Soviet Russian pop group founded in Moscow in 1986 by Russian composer-keyboardist Andrey Litjagin.

== Biography ==
=== 1986–1988 ===
Mirage borrowed their musical style from other eurodisco groups of the time such as Modern Talking and Bad Boys Blue.

Gulkina and Suhankina shared vocals on the debut album The Stars Await Us (Russian: Звёзды нас ждут) . The group toured without Suhankina, who was attempting a career as a professional opera singer, and using her pre-recorded vocals on the tour.

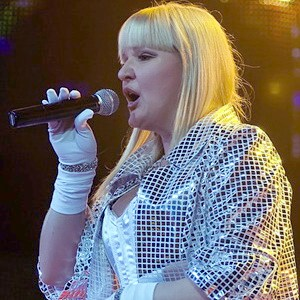
Margarita Suhankina

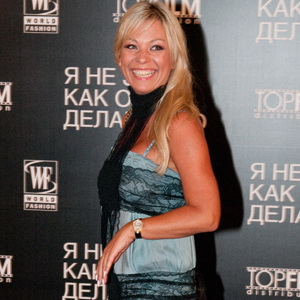
Irina Saltykova

Litjagin decided to create several "doubles" of Mirage to simultaneously tour different Russian cities, with the vocalists performing along with the studio session recording done by Gulkina and Suhankina. Among the new performers on stage were guitarist Igor Ponomarev, keyboardist Roman Zhukov, drummer Sergei Solopov, dancer Svetlana Razina (also the girlfriend of Litjagin), and "vocalists" Tatiana Ovsiyenko and Irina Saltykova.

Financial and creative disagreements led to Gulkina quitting the group in 1988. After the separation, Gulkina felt entitled to perform under the name Mirage, as she had provided most of the vocals. Litjagin and Sokolov prevailed in the Mirage name use issue; Gulkina formed a new group called Stars.

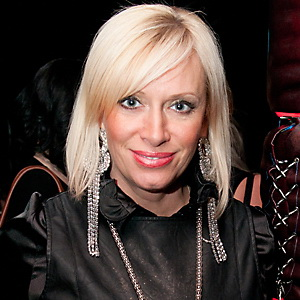
Natalia Gulkina

The second album Together Again (Russian: Снова вместе) was released in 1988 with only Suhankina featured on lead vocals. The combination of Mirage's trademark Euro disco sound with the guitar rock stylings of Gorbashov created a new style of music in Soviet Russia. The best known songs of the group were part of the album including Music has connected us (Russian: Музыка нас связала) and Together again (Russian: Снова вместе). The tour for this album featured the band performing along to studio-recorded vocals, and such was noted by the media.

=== 1991–present ===
In 1991, Ekaterina Boldysheva joined the group. She was the first vocalist to perform live with the group. Mirage song remixes were made of the group's then two albums that included Boldysheva's vocals and issued in 1994. She sang on what was to be the group's third studio album, Not for the first time (Russian: не в первый раз) which was completed in 2004, but released in 2008 due to the difficult economic climate of the time.

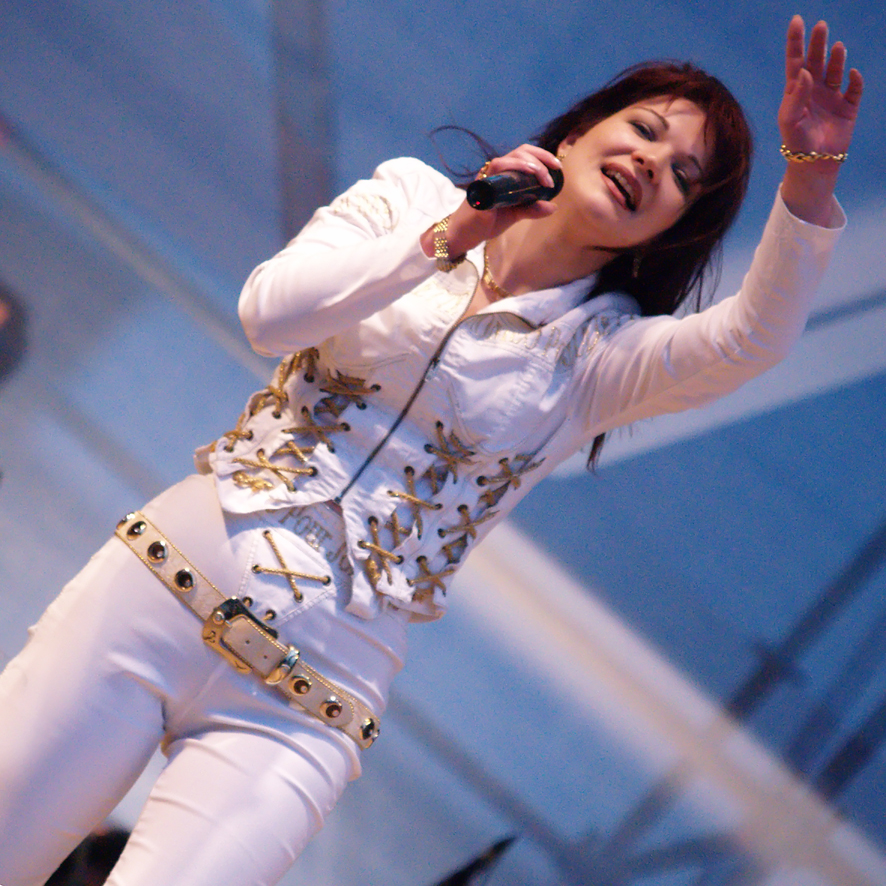
Ekaterina Boldysheva

Litjagin revived Mirage in 2003 with three new females that performed to remixed versions of already released Mirage songs. The new project enjoyed limited success, despite the release of several new remix albums.

In 2005, at an event at the "Olympic" arena in Moscow, all the ex-members of Mirage performed together live. Despite never having met before, Gulkina and Suhankina performed alongside one another. They later intended to perform as Mirage, but Litjagin took legal action to prevent such a use of the name, as he believed it would harm his version of Mirage that featured younger vocalists. Relations did improve enough for the three to collaborate on a poorly received fourth album, A Thousand Stars (Russian: Тысяча Звёзд), released in 2009.

Litjagin later renamed the younger version of the group "Mirage Junior". In 2011, Litjagin ended his working relationship with Gulkina and she was briefly replaced by former Mirage vocalist Svetlana Razina.

In 2013, a fifth Mirage album, Let Me Go! (Russian: Отпусти Меня) was released, featuring Suhankina on vocals.

In September 2016, Andrey Lityagin transferred the exclusive rights to the public performance of a number of his works and the right to the trademark "Mirage" to the "Jam" publishing company for management. Because of the mutual understanding found, it was decided to stop the activity of the group with the soloist Margarita Sukhankina as not corresponding with the stylistics and author's idea, and to revive the group "Mirage" in its original living line-up of 1980-1990s.

Currently, "Mirage" consists of Ekaterina Boldysheva (vocals), Alexei Gorbashov (guitar), Andrey Grishin (drums), and Sergey Krylov (keyboard instruments). To date, this line-up has the rights to perform songs from the repertoire of "Mirage" and the rights to use the trademark "Mirage" in the concert activities.

== Discography ==
- 1987: Звёзды нас ждут (The Stars Await Us)
- 1988: Снова вместе (Together Again)
- 2008: Не в первый раз (Not For The First Time)
- 2009: Тысяча звёзд (A Thousand Stars)
- 2013: Отпусти меня! (Let Me Go!)
