= Yuri Shatunov =

Russian singer (1973–2022)

Yuriy Shatunov
- Юрий Шатунов
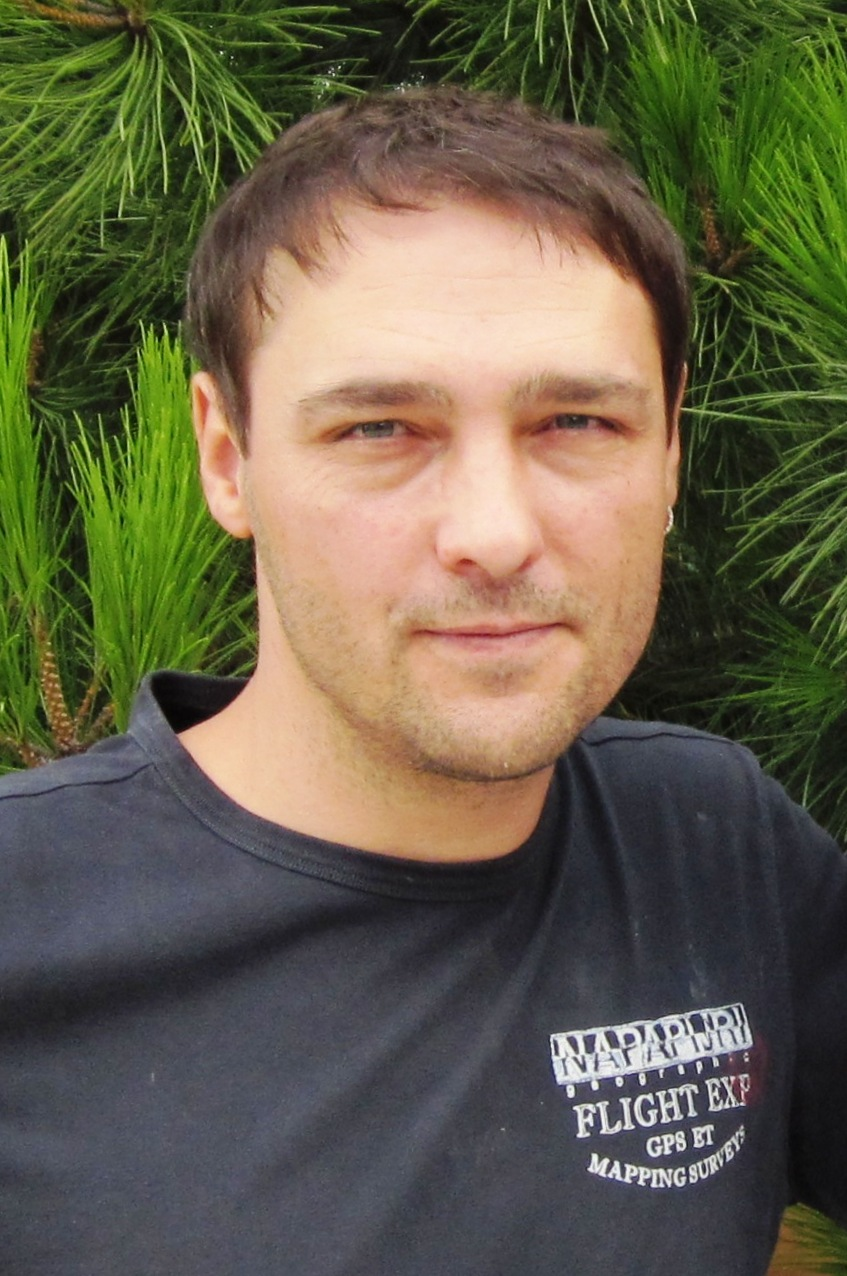
- Shatunov in 2011
- Born: 6 September 1973; Kumertau, Bashkir ASSR, Russian SFSR, Soviet Union
- Died: 23 June 2022 (aged 48); Domodedovo, Moscow Oblast, Russia
- Occupation: Singer
- Years active: 1986–2022
- Spouse: Svetlana Shatunova (m. 2007)
- Children: 2

Signature
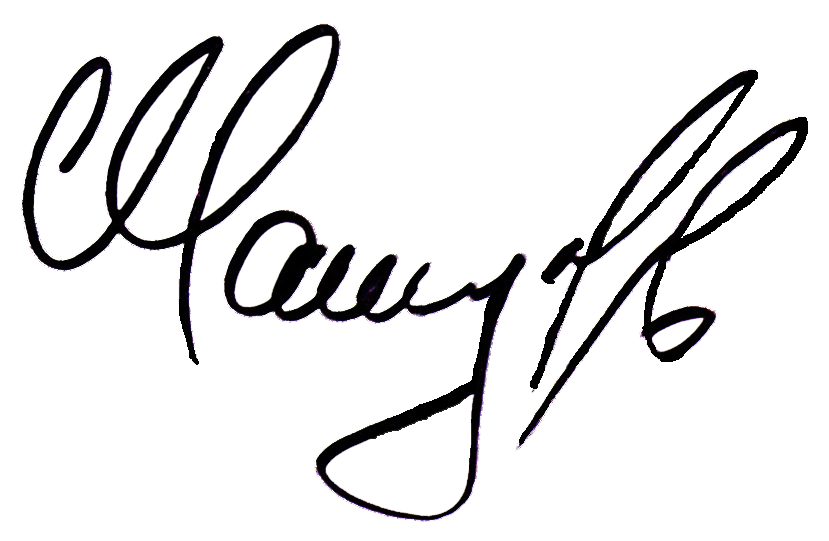

Yuriy Vasilevich Shatunov (Russian: Юрий Васильевич Шатунов; 6 September 1973 – 23 June 2022) was a Russian singer, best known as the lead vocalist of the Russian band Laskoviy Mai (Ласковый май), which were active during the 1980s. After Laskoviy Mai disbanded in 1992, Shatunov found recognition as a solo singer.

== Name ==
Due to a non-existent relationship with his father, Vasiliy Klimenko, Yuriy chose to use his mother's, Vera Shatunova's, surname at a young age.

== Personal life ==
Shatunov was born on the 6th of September 1973 in the city of Kumertau (Bashkir ASSR), Russian Soviet Federative Socialist Republic of the former Soviet Union. His father, Vasiliy Vladimirovich Klimenko, was half Russian and half Ukrainian.

At the age of three, Yuriy was abandoned by his father and thereafter, raised by his grandparents and then by his mother. When he was 11, his mother died of a heart disease. He went to live with his aunt's family, who soon found themselves unable to support him.

Shatunov was sent to Orenburg Children's Home Number 2 in Orenburg, where he had a reputation for poor behavior. This included running away from the orphanage, playing the guitar, singing on the streets to get money and cigarettes, getting into fights, and avoiding work.

He met with Sergei Kuznetsov, a music teacher in the orphanage, and they formed the band, "Laskoviy Mai" ("Tender May") At the age of 13, Yury Shatunov became the frontman for Laskovy Mai. One of the most common themes the young band members would sing about was unfortunate love. This was uncommon at the time, although, atypical considering the age of the two, both young teenagers. This group, in which Shatunov was the most famous lead singer, existed from 1986 to 1992. It was very popular in Russia.

In 1996, Shatunov moved to Germany, where he wanted to complete his education, but left unfinished as a result of his turbulent youth and early career in music. Whilst in Germany, Shatunov learned how to become a music producer.

Shatunov had a wife, a son and a daughter. Shatunov and his wife married in 2007 in Germany, after seven years of dating.

Before Shatunov died, he was busy working on his solo career and performed frequently in the Eastern European countries, Germany and Russia, as well as some of the former Soviet bloc countries in Central Asia such as Kazakhstan and Kyrgyzstan.

Yuriy Shatunov died on the night of 23 June 2022 of acute heart failure (myocardial infarction) in a Moscow hospital at the age of 48. The singer's condition deteriorated critically on the way to a hospital in Domodedovo where he underwent intensive resuscitation, but could not be saved. Funeral ceremonies for Yuriy Shatunov were held on 26 June 2022 in the farewell hall of Moscow's Troyekurovskoye Cemetery. He was cremated a day later. On 28 June 2022, the urn containing his ashes was partially buried in Moscow's Troyekurovskoye Cemetery and the other part of the ashes, in accordance with the singer's wishes, were to be scattered into one of the lakes in Munich, Germany.

=== Rights to songs and performances ===
On 17 June 2022, it became known that Shatunov had sued for the rights to the compositions of the group "Tender May". On 20 June the singer gave the last TV interview in his life, in which he commented on the trial with Razin. In 1992, the songwriter Sergey Kuznetsov signed a contract with Andrey Razin and 14 years later they made a deal, based on which the producer became the sole owner of the group's hits. However, during the trial it turned out that "no one has ever seen the original contract." Moreover, the examination proved that Kuznetsov's signature was forged, which meant that the transaction was wrong.

== Discography ==
=== Studio albums ===
- Do You Remember... (Russian: Ты помнишь…) (1994)
- Remember May (Russian: Вспомни май) (2001)
- Gray Night (Russian: Седая ночь) (2002)
- Leaves Fall (Russian: Падают листья) (2003)
- If You Want... Don't Be Afraid (Russian: Если хочешь… Не бойся) (2004)
- Record My Voice (Russian: Запиши мой голос) (2006)
- I Believe... (Russian: Я верю…) (2012)
- Happy Birthday! (Russian: С днём рождения!) (2017)
- On Christmas (Russian: В Рождество) (2018)
- Don't Be Silent... (Russian: Не молчи…) (2018)
- Favorite Songs (Russian: Любимые песни) (2019)
- Thank You (Russian: Спасибо тебе) (2020)
- I Cannot Stop (Russian: Остановиться не могу) (2020)
- Snow Covers Leaves (Russian: Заметает листья снег) (2020)
- About White Roses (Russian: Про белые розы) (2025)
- Don't Argue With Me (Russian: Не спорь с мной) (2022)
- To Each His Own (Russian: Каждому своё) (2022)

=== Singles ===
- Belye rozy – The White Roses: 1986 demo, 1988, 1996 remix, 2003 remix, 2004, 2005, 2019
- Zabud – Forget: 2001, 2002 remix, 2004, 2019
- Tet-a-tet – One-in-one: 2011, 2019
- A leto cveta – The summer colors: 2012, 2018
- Detstvo – Childhood: 1992, 2002, 2005, 2019
- Sedaya noch – Grizzled night: 1986 demo, 1988, 1996 remix, 2001, 2019
- Ne boisya – Do not be afraid: 2003, 2005, 2018
- Rozovyi vecher – Pink evening: 1988, 1996 remix, 2003 remix, 2005, 2019
- Gryozy – Dreams: 2014, 2018
- Leto – Summer: 1986 demo, 1988, 1996 remix, 2001 remix, 2004
- Vecher holodnoyi zimy – Cold winter evening: 1986 demo, 2002, 2019
- Ryadom s nei – Next to her: 2014, 2018
- Chto zh ty, leto – What are you, summer: 2002, 2019
- Nu chto zhe ty – Well, what are you: 1986 demo, 1988, 1996 remix, 2004
- Zvyozdnaya noch – Starry night: 1992, 2018
- Poezda – Trains: 2014
- Pust budet noch – Let it be the night: 1986 demo, 1988, 2004
- Glupye snezhinki – Silly snowflakes: 1988, 2011
- Zhizn moya – My life: 2014, 2018
- Zapishi moi golos na kassettu – Record my voice on tape: 2005, 2018
- Medlenno uhodit osen – Slowly autumn departs: 1986 demo, 1988, 2002, 2005, 2019
- Odnoklassniki – Classmates: 2015, 2018
- Maiskii vecher – May evening: 2008, 2012
- Zvezda – Stars: 2015, 2018
- Padayut listya – Leaves are Falling: 2001, 2002 remix, 2005
- Ot belyh roz – From the white roses: 2011
- Tayuschii sneg – Melting snow: 1986 demo, 1988, 1996 remix, 2005
- I ya pod kitaru – And I play guitar: 2015, 2017
- Ty prosto byl : You've just been: 1988
- Ya otkrovenen – I'm frankly: 1986 demo, 1988, 1996 remix, 2004
- Posle vypusknogo – After the graduation: 2005
- Ne molchi – Do not be silent: 2018
- Privet – Hi: 2012
- Esli hochesh – If you want to: 2004
- Ya teryayu – I'm losing: 2001, 2002 remix
- S dnjom rozhdenija: Happy birthday – 2017
- I upav na koleni – And having fallen on his knees: 1993
- Ya veryu – I believe: 2012
- Ty prosti menya, prosti – Forgive me, forgive: 2005
- V pozhdestvo – (On) The Christmas: 2018
- Bez tebya – Without you: 2012
- Skolko mozhno – How much: 2005
- A pomnish – The remember: 1999, 2005, 2019
- A ty vosmi i pozvoni – And you take it and call: 2018
- Ya peressorilsya v dozhdyom – I quarreled in the rain: 2001
- Ne hochu – I do not want: 2012, 2019
- Mama – Mum: 1993
- Ty mne ne verish – You do not believe me: 2018
- Romashki – Daisies: 2012, 2019
- Pismo – Letter: 1993, 2019 remix
