= Imperial Treasures =

- Created by: Tina Kandelaki; Arkady Vodakhov
- Developed by: Plan B Media
- Directed by: Lika Blank; Tatiana Mironova
- Presented by: Olga Buzova; Mikhail Galustyan
- No. of series: 3

Imperial Treasures (Russian: Сокровища императора) is a Russian reality television show, that broadcast on TNT. The format was claimed an unlicensed edition of the international franchise The Amazing Race, but, unlike all other versions, filmed within only one country, China.

Every leg begins with an Initial Trial, series of mini-challenges to determine the starting order and amount of provided money. After completing, a hint is given to reach a definite location and perform there a task, finishing which next clue is deduced; this creates a unique route containing from eight to ten checkpoints. Typical race requires teams of celebrities to navigate themselves in foreign areas and interact with locals, while travelling across provinces by public transportation options, such as taxi, bus, metro or train. Ending up participants arrive to a Pit Stop, where meet Mikhail Galustyan & Olga Buzova and find their standings: first ones receive 1 million, last ones eliminate immediately. Winners get additional 8 millions, that makes the prize pool of 20 million rubles.

The concept was introduced at the St. Petersburg International Economic Forum and was named "a new story for the television", due to the largest production crew, so players being filmed in the different places at the same time, independently of others.

== Series overview ==
Series	Teams	Episodes	Originally released		Winners	Runners-up	Finalists
Series	Teams	Episodes	First released	Last released	Winners	Runners-up	Finalists
1	15	13	10 March 2024	2 June 2024	Maria Minogarova & Pavel Mamaev	Kirill Sarychev & Vasily Kamotsky	Evgenia Iskandarova & Karina Koks
2	15	13	6 April 2025	29 June 2025	Nyusha & Maria Shurochkina	Anton Shkaplerov & Kristina Shkaplerova	Sofia Kashtanova & Wolfgang Cerny
3	15	13	12 April 2026	5 July 2026	Nikita Katsalapov & Victoria Sinitsina	Ekaterina Morgunova & Yana Koshkina	David Manukyan & Misha Marvin

=== Season 1 (2024) ===
Contestant	Age	Occupation	Team colour	Entered	Exited	Status
Zurab Matua	43	Comedy Club comedian		Day 1	Day 3	Eliminated 1st
Andrey Averin	45	Comedy Club comedian		Day 1	Day 3	Eliminated 1st
Evelina Tarkhanova	23	TikTok blogger		Day 1	Day 6	Eliminated 2nd
Yan Shaimukhametov	25	TikTok blogger		Day 1	Day 6	Eliminated 2nd
Alexander Ptashenchuk	37	Once in Russia comedian		Day 7	Day 9	Eliminated 3rd
Mikhail Stognienko	39	Once in Russia comedian		Day 7	Day 9	Eliminated 3rd
Vladimir Selivanov	38	Real guys actor		Day 4	Day 12	Eliminated 4th
Alexandra Selivanova	29	Dietitian		Day 4	Day 12	Eliminated 4th
Anfisa Chekhova	46	Talk show presenter		Day 13	Day 15	Eliminated 5th
Alexander Zlatopolsky	43	Film director		Day 13	Day 15	Eliminated 5th
GeeGun	38	Rapper		Day 1	Day 18	Eliminated 6th
Oxana Samoilova	36	Cosmetics brand founder		Day 1	Day 18	Eliminated 6th
Marat Basharov	49	Bitva extrasensov presenter		Day 16	Day 21	Eliminated 7th
Anastasia Borisova	37	Stage actress		Day 16	Day 21	Eliminated 7th
Denis Lebedev	44	Boxer		Day 1	Day 24	Eliminated 8th
Kostya Tszyu	54	Boxer		Day 1	Day 24	Eliminated 8th
Ivan Pyshnenko	42	KVN comedian		Day 1	Day 27	Eliminated 9th
Daria Blokhina	30	Voice actress		Day 1	Day 27	Eliminated 9th
Anatoly Tsoy	34	MBAND singer		Day 1	Day 30	Eliminated 10th
Ksenia Lugovaya	34	Singer		Day 1	Day 30	Eliminated 10th
Timur Rodriguez	44	Radio personality		Day 1	Day 33	Eliminated 11th
Ekaterina Kabak	33	The Club actress		Day 1	Day 33	Eliminated 11th
Oleg Vereshchagin	41	Comedy Woman comedian		Day 1	Day 36	Eliminated 12th
Alexandra Vereshchagina	42	Wedding photographer		Day 1	Day 36	Eliminated 12th
Evgenia Iskandarova	32	Stand-Up comedienne		Day 1	Day 39	Finalists
Karina Koks	41	Slivki singer		Day 1	Day 39	Finalists
Kirill Sarychev	35	Powerlifter		Day 1	Day 40	Runners-up
Vasily Kamotsky	34	Armwrestler		Day 1	Day 40	Runners-up
Maria Minogarova	34	Model		Day 10	Day 40	Winners
Pavel Mamaev	35	Football player		Day 10	Day 40	Winners

Pair	1	2	3	4	5	6	7	8	9	10	11	12	13	Avg
Maria & Pavel	❌	❌	❌	6th	7th	1st	5th	2nd	3rd	4th	3rd	1st	1st	3.3
Kirill & Vasily	6th	3rd	3rd	3rd	4th	2nd	6th	7th	2nd	2nd	1st	3rd	2nd	3.3
Evgenia & Karina	4th	2nd	2nd	1st	3rd	4th	1st	1st	1st	5th	2nd	2nd	3rd	2.3
Oleg & Alexandra	1st	1st	1st	9th	2nd	3rd	4th	6th	5th	1st	4th	4th		3.4
Timur & Ekaterina	5th	4th	6th	2nd	1st	5th	3rd	4th	6th	3rd	5th			4.0
Anatoly & Ksenia	2nd	9th	7th	4th	6th	8th	8th	5th	4th	6th				5.9
Ivan & Daria	3rd	5th	4th	8th	5th	9th	2nd	3rd	7th					5.1
Denis & Kostya	9th	7th	8th	7th	9th	6th	7th	8th						7.6
Marat & Anastasia	❌	❌	❌	❌	❌	7th	9th							8.0
GeeGun & Oxana	7th	6th	9th	5th	8th	10th								7.5
Anfisa & Alexander	❌	❌	❌	❌	10th									10.0
Vladimir & Alexandra	❌	8th	5th	10th										7.6
Alexander & Mikhail	❌	❌	10th											10.0
Evelina & Yan	8th	10th												9.0
Zurab & Andrey	10th													10.0

=== Season 2 (2025) ===
Contestant	Age	Occupation	Team colour	Entered	Exited	Status
Masha Malinovskaya	44	Video jockey		Day 1	Day 3	Eliminated 1st
Marina Sadkova	56	Real estate agent		Day 1	Day 3	Eliminated 1st
Alexey Dolmatov	45	Centr rapper		Day 1	Day 6	Eliminated 2nd
Olga Dolmatova	42	Record producer		Day 1	Day 6	Eliminated 2nd
Roza Syabitova	63	Let's Get Married presenter		Day 4	Day 9	Eliminated 3rd
Denis Syabitov	35	Toastmaster		Day 4	Day 9	Eliminated 3rd
Glukoza	38	Singer		Day 1	Day 12	Eliminated 4th
Lidia Chistyakova	18	Music college student		Day 1	Day 12	Eliminated 4th
Mikhail Kukota	37	KVN comedian		Day 13	Day 15	Eliminated 5th
Karen Arutyunov	42	KVN comedian		Day 13	Day 15	Eliminated 5th
Dmitry Shchebet	33	Dancing with the Stars professional		Day 1	Day 18	Eliminated 6th
Yulianna Bukholts	32	Dancing with the Stars professional		Day 1	Day 18	Eliminated 6th
Denis Klyaver	50	Chai vdvoem singer		Day 1	Day 21	Eliminated 7th
Alexandra Savelieva	41	Fabrika singer		Day 1	Day 21	Eliminated 7th
Artem Kacher	36	Rapper		Day 1	Day 24	Eliminated 8th
Lesha Svik	34	Rapper		Day 1	Day 24	Eliminated 8th
Alena Zhigalova	44	Interviewer		Day 10	Day 27	Eliminated 9th
Ekaterina Gordon	44	Public figure		Day 10	Day 27	Eliminated 9th
Lina Dzhebisashvili	39	Bitva extrasensov star		Day 1	Day 30	Eliminated 10th
Magomed Ismailov	38	MMA fighter		Day 1	Day 30	Eliminated 10th
Ksenia Borodina	41	Dom-2 presenter		Day 16	Day 33	Eliminated 11th
Regina Todorenko	35	Heads and Tails presenter		Day 16	Day 33	Eliminated 11th
Irina Dubtsova	43	Singer		Day 1	Day 36	Eliminated 12th
Natan Mirov	39	Rapper		Day 1	Day 36	Eliminated 12th
Sofia Kashtanova	37	Psychologistesses actress		Day 7	Day 39	Finalists
Wolfgang Cerny	40	Nuremberg actor		Day 7	Day 39	Finalists
Anton Shkaplerov	53	Cosmonaut		Day 1	Day 40	Runners-up
Kristina Shkaplerova	30	Rocket scientist		Day 1	Day 40	Runners-up
Nyusha	34	Singer		Day 1	Day 40	Winners
Maria Shurochkina	30	Synchronized swimmer		Day 1	Day 40	Winners

Pair	1	2	3	4	5	6	7	8	9	10	11	12	13	Avg
Nyusha & Maria	5th	5th	9th	6th	2nd	8th	3rd	6th	5th	5th	1st	1st	1st	4.3
Anton & Kristina	2nd	4th	3rd	3rd	1st	2nd	2nd	4th	4th	1st	2nd	3rd	2nd	2.5
Sofia & Wolfgang	❌	❌	6th	1st	4th	7th	5th	1st	3rd	3rd	4th	2nd	3rd	3.5
Irina & Natan	1st	1st	5th	5th	6th	1st	6th	3rd	1st	2nd	3rd	4th		3.1
Ksenia & Regina	❌	❌	❌	❌	❌	5th	4th	5th	2nd	4th	5th			4.1
Lina & Magomed	3rd	2nd	1st	4th	9th	9th	1st	2nd	6th	6th				4.3
Alena & Ekaterina	❌	❌	❌	7th	5th	6th	8th	7th	7th					6.6
Artem & Lesha	9th	6th	7th	9th	3rd	4th	7th	8th						6.6
Denis & Alexandra	4th	3rd	2nd	2nd	7th	3rd	9th							4.2
Dmitry & Yulianna	8th	7th	4th	8th	8th	10th								7.5
Mikhail & Karen	❌	❌	❌	❌	10th									10.0
Glukoza & Lidia	6th	8th	8th	10th										8.0
Roza & Denis	❌	9th	10th											9.5
Alexey & Olga	7th	10th												8.5
Masha & Marina	10th													10.0

=== Season 3 (2026) ===
Contestant	Age	Occupation	Team colour	Entered	Exited	Status
Anna Tsukanova-Kott	36	Silver Spoon actress		Day 1	Day 3	Eliminated 1st
Anna Chapman	44	Intelligence officer		Day 1	Day 3	Eliminated 1st
Alexander Emelianenko	44	MMA fighter		Day 4	Day 6	Eliminated 2nd
Igor Kostenko	45	Lawyer		Day 4	Day 6	Eliminated 2nd
Igor Rybakov	53	Businessman		Day 1	Day 9	Eliminated 3rd
Polina Rybakova	25	MFTI student		Day 1	Day 9	Eliminated 3rd
Instasamka	25	Rapper		Day 1	Day 12	Eliminated 4th
Moneyken	25	Rapper		Day 1	Day 12	Eliminated 4th
Irina Bezrukova	60	Stage actress		Day 1	Day 15	Eliminated 5th
Stanislav Vlaiku	36	PR director		Day 1	Day 15	Eliminated 5th
Leonid Slutsky	54	Football manager		Day 10	Day 18	Eliminated 6th
Oleg Yarovinsky	44	Football coach		Day 10	Day 18	Eliminated 6th
Ilya Glinnikov	41	Interns actor		Day 1	Day 21	Eliminated 7th
Daria Yanina	35	The Club actress		Day 1	Day 21	Eliminated 7th
Natasha Koroleva	52	Singer		Day 16	Day 24	Eliminated 8th
Melissa Glushko	25	Make-up artist		Day 16	Day 24	Eliminated 8th
Pavel Derevyanko	49	Unprincipled actor		Day 7	Day 27	Eliminated 9th
Zoya Futs	35	Clothing line designer		Day 7	Day 27	Eliminated 9th
Victoria Daineko	38	Singer		Day 1	Day 30	Eliminated 10th
Berkeli Ovezov	39	Oil engineer		Day 1	Day 30	Eliminated 10th
Dina Averina	27	Rhythmic gymnast		Day 1	Day 33	Eliminated 11th
Arina Averina	27	Rhythmic gymnast		Day 1	Day 33	Eliminated 11th
Maria Pogrebnyak	38	Instagram blogger		Day 1	Day 36	Eliminated 12th
Ekaterina Shkuro	26	TikTok blogger		Day 1	Day 36	Eliminated 12th
David Manukyan	33	Rapper		Day 1	Day 39	Finalists
Misha Marvin	36	Singer		Day 1	Day 39	Finalists
Ekaterina Morgunova	39	Once in Russia comedienne		Day 13	Day 40	Runners-up
Yana Koshkina	36	Once in Russia comedienne		Day 13	Day 40	Runners-up
Nikita Katsalapov	34	Figure skater		Day 1	Day 40	Winners
Victoria Sinitsina	30	Figure skater		Day 1	Day 40	Winners

Pair	1	2	3	4	5	6	7	8	9	10	11	12	13	Avg
Nikita & Victoria	1st	4th	2nd	2nd	8th	3rd	8th	1st	3rd	5th	1st	3rd	1st	3.2
Ekaterina & Yana	❌	❌	❌	❌	7th	9th	5th	2nd	4th	3rd	3rd	2nd	2nd	4.1
David & Misha	9th	3rd	9th	6th	6th	4th	4th	3rd	2nd	4th	4th	1st	3rd	4.4
Maria & Ekaterina	2nd	6th	5th	3rd	9th	7th	3rd	7th	5th	1st	2nd	4th		4.5
Dina & Arina	4th	1st	6th	1st	1st	2nd	6th	6th	1st	2nd	5th			3.1
Victoria & Berkeli	6th	7th	1st	5th	3rd	1st	1st	5th	6th	6th				4.1
Pavel & Zoya	❌	❌	8th	7th	4th	6th	2nd	4th	7th					5.4
Natasha & Melissa	❌	❌	❌	❌	❌	8th	7th	8th						7.6
Ilya & Daria	7th	9th	4th	8th	5th	5th	9th							6.7
Leonid & Oleg	❌	❌	❌	4th	2nd	10th								5.3
Irina & Stanislav	8th	8th	7th	9th	10th									8.4
Instasamka & Moneyken	5th	2nd	3rd	10th										5.0
Igor & Polina	3rd	5th	10th											6.0
Alexander & Igor	❌	10th												10.0
Anna & Anna	10th													10.0
