= Artik & Asti =

Russian music duo

Artik & Asti

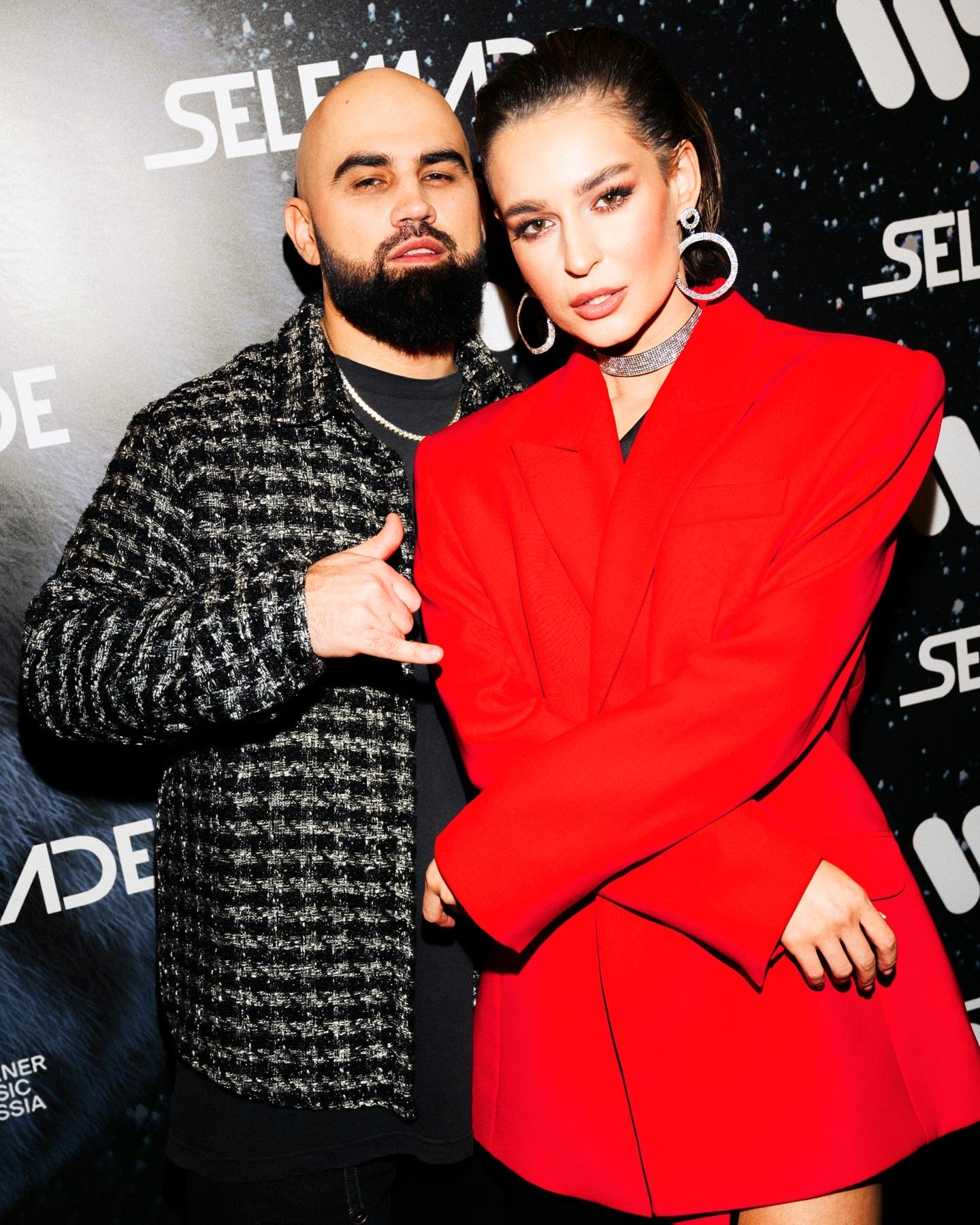
- Artik and Seville, 2022

Background information
- Origin: Moscow, Russia
- Genres: Pop music; R&B; Pop rap; Deep house; Dance music
- Years active: 2010–present
- Members: Artyom Umrikhin; Seville Velieva
- Past members: Anna Dzyuba (2010–2021)
- Website: Official site

Artik & Asti (Russian: «Артик и Асти») is a Ukrainian pop group, formed in 2010 by producer and singer Artyom Umrikhin. The group currently consists of Seville (Seville Velieva).

== History ==
In 2010, producer Artyom Umrikhin thought of another musical project, but he needed a vocalist. On the Internet he found Anna Dzyuba and offered her a spot. In a music studio in Kyiv, they wrote their first composition. The first song of Artik & Asti was «Антистресс». Their next song «Моя последняя надежда» appeared on radio airwaves & brought them fame. A video for the song garnered 1.5 million views on YouTube over the course of a few months. Their third single «Облака» entered the top 100 most played songs in Russia. In 2013 they released the composition «Сладкий сон», for which the music video has over 2 million views on YouTube. The group performed many tours in Russia and in Europe.

== Formation of the group ==
Artyom Igorevich Umrikhin (Artik) was born on 9 December 1985 in Zaporizhzhia. At the age of eleven he fell in love with hip-hop. He recorded his first songs in 1997. From there, he performed in local clubs. In 2003 he helped form the group «Караты» and moved to Kyiv. His group quickly became popular. Later, Artik collaborated with other well-known artists, including Yulia Savicheva, Anna Sedokova, Dj Smash, & Ivan Dorn.

== Discography ==
=== Studio albums ===
Title	Information	Notes
#РайОдинНаДвоих	Release: 1 October 2013; Label: Self Made Music; Format: CD, digital distribution	* Track List: No. / Title / Length; 1. / "Антистресс" / 2:52; 2. / "Облака" / 3:38; 3. / "Сладкий сон" / 3:19; 4. / "Больше, чем любовь" / 2:54; 5. / "Очень-очень" / 3:00; 6. / "До утра" / 3:30; 7. / "На край земли" / 3:17; 8. / "Атом" (feat. DJ Smash) / 3:47; 9. / "Один на миллион" / 2:58; 10. / "Осколки" / 4:29; 11. / "Держи меня крепче" / 3:29; 12. / "Моя последняя надежда" / 3:15; Total length: / / 37:88
Здесь и сейчас (Platinum Edition)	Release: 10 February 2015; Label: SBA Production; Format: CD, digital distribution	* Track-list: No. / Title / Length; 1. / "Здесь и сейчас" / 3:09; 2. / "Поцелуи" / 4:09; 3. / "Половина" / 3:07; 4. / "Необыкновенная" / 3:22; 5. / "Никому не отдам" / 3:36; 6. / "Небо над Москвой" (feat. DJ LOYZA) / 2:59; 7. / "Сто причин" / 3:53; 8. / "Зима" / 3:21; 9. / "Тебе всё можно" / 4:03; 10. / "Помню" / 3:35; 11. / "Так было" / 3:24; 12. / "Кто я тебе?" / 3:08; 13. / "Половина" (DICAPRI Remix) / 5:04; 14. / "Никому не отдам" (DJ Vincent & DJ Diaz Remix) / 5:22; 15. / "Тебе всё можно" (Radio Edit) / 4:06; 16. / "Кто я тебе?!" (Diggo & Dizza Remix) / 5:23; 17. / "Кто я тебе?!" (Santi & Rebets Radio Edit) / 2:54; 18. / "Кто я тебе?!" (Tobie Bryant Remix) / 5:07; 19. / "Кто я тебе?!" (Original Voice) / 3:08; 20. / "Тебе всё можно" (XDMX Remix) / 4:41; Total length: / / 39:86
Номер 1	Release: 21 April 2017; Label: Self Made Music / Warner Music; Format: CD, digital distribution	* Track-list: No. / Title / Length; 1. / "Номер 1" / 2:58; 2. / "Таких не бывает" / 3:00; 3. / "До последнего вздоха" / 3:13; 4. / "Я твоя" / 3:28; 5. / "Тебе одному" / 3:52; 6. / "Неделимы" / 3:26; 7. / "Любовь никогда не умрёт" / 4:04; 8. / "Мы будем вместе" / 3:06; 9. / "Ангел" / 3:47; 10. / "От тебя" / 3:08; 11. / "Когда ты со мной" / 3:27; 12. / "Зачем я тебе?!" / 3:27; 13. / "Lips On Mine" (Bonus Track) / 3:42; Total length: / / 42:38
Миллениум X	Release: 23 July 2021; Label: Self Made Music / Warner Music; Format: digital distribution	* Track-list: No. / Title / Length; 1. / "Она не я" / 3:34; 2. / "Истеричка" / 3:42; 3. / "Бла Бла" / 3:37; 4. / "Лампочки" / 3:16; 5. / "Любовь после тебя" / 4:05; 6. / "Голову кружу" / 3:05; 7. / "Фурия" / 3:46; 8. / "Буду одна" / 3:18; 9. / "Миллениум" / 3:11; Total length: / / 30:14

=== Mini albums ===
Title	Information	References
7 (Part 1)	Release: 29 March 2019; Label: Self Made Music / Warner Music; Format: CD, digital distribution	Track-list (link)
7 (Part 2)	Release: 7 February 2020; Label: Self Made Music / Warner Music; Format: CD, Digital distribution	Track-list (link)

=== Official singles ===
Year	Single	Album
2011	«Моя последняя надежда»	#РайОдинНаДвоих
2012	«Облака»	#РайОдинНаДвоих
2013	«Сладкий сон»	#РайОдинНаДвоих
2013	«Держи меня крепче»	#РайОдинНаДвоих
2013	«На край земли»	#РайОдинНаДвоих
2013	«Больше, чем любовь»	#РайОдинНаДвоих
2014	«Очень-очень»	#РайОдинНаДвоих
2014	«Половина»	Здесь и сейчас
2014	«Никому не отдам»	Здесь и сейчас
2015	«Кто я тебе?»	Здесь и сейчас
2015	«Тебе всё можно»	Здесь и сейчас
2016	«Я твоя»	Номер 1
2017	«Неделимы»	Номер 1
2017	«Номер 1»	Номер 1
2018	«Зачем я тебе?!»	Номер 1
2018	«Ангел»	Номер 1
2018	«Невероятно»	
2019	"Грустный дэнс" (feat. Artyom Kacher)	7 (Part 1)
2020	«Девочка танцуй»	7 (Part 2)
2021	«Истеричка»	Миллениум Х
2021	«Она не я»	Миллениум Х
2021	«Я так люблю тебя»	13 друзей Билана (compilation of Dima Bilan)
2022	«Гармония»	TBA
2022	«CO2» (with DJ Smash)	TBA
2023	«Кукла»	TBA

=== Featuring Artik & Asti ===
Year	Title	Альбом
2016	«Меланхолия» (Интонация feat. Artik & Asti)	Не отступай (album of Интонация)
2016	«Не отдам» (Марсель feat. Artik & Asti)	О любви, печали и радости (album of Марсель)
2017	«Пахну лишь тобой» (Glukoza feat. Artik & Asti)	
2018	«Азербайджан» (EMIN, Aleks Malinovsky, Emil Kadyrov, Glukoza, Aleksandr Panayotov, Timur Rodriguez & Bahh Tee feat. Artik & Asti)	ЖАРА'18
2018	«Вдвоём» (Misha Marvin feat. Artik & Asti)	Чувствуй — EP (album of Misha Marvin)
2019	«Таких не бывает» (GeeGun feat. Artik & Asti)	Край рая (album of GeeGun)
2019	«Моя вина» (ST feat. Artik & Asti)	Поэт дуэт (album of ST)
2019	«Полечу за тобою» (Руки Вверх! feat. Artik & Asti)	
2020	«Возьми мою руку» (Stas Mikhaylov feat. Artik & Asti)	
2020	«Спасибо докторам» (Various artists feat. Artik & Asti)	
2020	«Капелькою» (DJ Loyza & Valeriya feat. Artik & Asti)	
2020	«Мы в Солярисе» (DJ Leonid Rudenko feat. Artik & Asti)	
2020	«Не все герои носят плащи» (Various artists feat. Artik & Asti)	
2020	«Москва не верит слезам» (Руки Вверх! feat. Artik & Asti)	
2021	«Танцуй» (Ханза &amp; QWEEK feat. Artik & Asti)	
2021	«Молча» (Artyom Kacher feat. Artik & Asti)	КАЧЕР (album of Artyom Kacher)
2021	«МамаМия» (Jah Khalib feat. Artik & Asti)	Desert Eagle (album of Jah Khalib)
2021	«Градусы» (Dmitry Malikov feat. Artik & Asti)	
2021	«Family» (David Guetta feat. Artik & Asti & A Boogie wit da Hoodie)	

== Videography ==
Year	Clip	Director	Composers	Album
2011	«Моя последняя надежда»	A.I Lisenkov	Artyom Umrikhin (ARTIK) & Anna Dzyuba (ASTI)	#РайОдинНаДвоих
2012	«Облака»	Artyom Umrikhin (Artik)	Artyom Umrikhin (ARTIK) & Anna Dzyuba (ASTI)	#РайОдинНаДвоих
2013	«Сладкий сон»	Aleksei Figurov	Artyom Umrikhin (ARTIK) & Anna Dzyuba (ASTI)	#РайОдинНаДвоих
2013	«Держи меня крепче»	Stanislav Morozov	Artyom Umrikhin (ARTIK) & Anna Dzyuba (ASTI)	#РайОдинНаДвоих
2013	«На край земли»	Indy Hait	Artyom Umrikhin (ARTIK) & Anna Dzyuba (ASTI)	#РайОдинНаДвоих
2013	«Больше, чем любовь»	Stanislav Morozov	Artyom Umrikhin (ARTIK) & Anna Dzyuba (ASTI)	#РайОдинНаДвоих
2014	«Очень-очень»	Indy Hait	Artyom Umrikhin (ARTIK) & Anna Dzyuba (ASTI)	#РайОдинНаДвоих
2014	«Половина»	Pavel Hoodyakov	Artyom Umrikhin (ARTIK) & Anna Dzyuba (ASTI)	Здесь и сейчаc
2014	«Никому не отдам»	Aleksei Verenchik	Artyom Umrikhin (ARTIK) & Anna Dzyuba (ASTI)	Здесь и сейчаc
2015	«Кто я тебе?»	Nadezhda Bedzhanova	Artyom Umrikhin (ARTIK) & Anna Dzyuba (ASTI)	Здесь и сейчаc
2015	«Тебе всё можно»	Rina Kasyura	Artyom Umrikhin (ARTIK) & Anna Dzyuba (ASTI)	Здесь и сейчаc
2016	«Я твоя»	Yudzhin	Artyom Umrikhin (ARTIK) & Anna Dzyuba (ASTI)	Номер 1
2016	«Не отдам» (feat. Марсель)	Yudzhin	Artyom Umrikhin (ARTIK) & Anna Dzyuba (ASTI)	О любви, печали и радости (album of Марсель)
2017	«Неделимы»	Aleksei Golubev	Artyom Umrikhin (ARTIK) & Anna Dzyuba (ASTI)	Номер 1
2017	«Пахну лишь тобой» (feat.Glukoza)	Maks Kitaev	Artyom Umrikhin (ARTIK) & Anna Dzyuba (ASTI)	No album
2017	«Номер 1»	Simon Saprichyan	Artyom Umrikhin (ARTIK) & Anna Dzyuba (ASTI)	Номер 1
2018	«Зачем я тебе?!»	Dmitry Litvinenko	Artyom Umrikhin (ARTIK) & Anna Dzyuba (ASTI)	Номер 1
2018	«Ангел»	Mareta Keligova	Artyom Umrikhin (ARTIK) & Anna Dzyuba (ASTI)	Номер 1
2018	«Невероятно»	Simon, Pavel Hoodyakov	Artyom Umrikhin (ARTIK) & Anna Dzyuba (ASTI)	No album
2019	«Грустный дэнс» (feat. Artyom Kacher)	VISNU	Artyom Umrikhin (ARTIK) & Anna Dzyuba (ASTI)	7 (Part 1)
2019	"Под гипнозом"	Alan Badoev	Artyom Umrikhin (ARTIK) & Anna Dzyuba (ASTI)	7 (Part 1)
2019	«Таких не бывает» (feat. GeeGun)	Aleksei Golubev	Artyom Umrikhin (ARTIK) & Anna Dzyuba (ASTI)	Край рая (album of GeeGun)
2020	«Девочка танцуй»	Alan Badoev	Artyom Umrikhin (ARTIK) & Anna Dzyuba (ASTI)	7 (Part 2)
2020	«Мы в Солярисе» (feat. DJ Leonid Rudenko)	Unknown	Artyom Umrikhin (ARTIK) & Anna Dzyuba (ASTI)	
2020	«Не все герои носят плащи» (feat. Разные артисты)	Unknown	Artyom Umrikhin (ARTIK) & Anna Dzyuba (ASTI)	
2020	«Спасибо докторам» (feat. Разные артисты)	Unknown	Artyom Umrikhin (ARTIK) & Anna Dzyuba (ASTI)	
2020	«Возьми мою руку» (feat. Stas Mikhaylov)	Yudzhin	Artyom Umrikhin (ARTIK) & Anna Dzyuba (ASTI)	
2020	«Москва не верит слезам» (feat. Руки Вверх!)	Artyom Sotnik	Artyom Umrikhin (ARTIK) & Anna Dzyuba (ASTI)	
2021	«Истеричка»	Alan Badoev	Artyom Umrikhin (ARTIK) & Anna Dzyuba (ASTI)	Миллениум Х
2021	«МамаМия» (feat. Jah Khalib)	Aymat Rakhmatov	Artyom Umrikhin (ARTIK) & Anna Dzyuba (ASTI)	Desert Eagle (album of Jah Khalib)
2021	«Она не я»	Alan Badoev	Artyom Umrikhin (ARTIK) & Anna Dzyuba (ASTI)	Миллениум Х
2022	«Гармония»	Yuriy Katunsky	Artyom Umrikhin (ARTIK) & Seville Velieva (SEVILLE)	TBA
2022	«CO2» (feat. DJ Smash)	Katerina Yak	Artyom Umrikhin (ARTIK) & Seville Velieva (SEVILLE)	TBA
2023	«Кукла»	Sasha Sakhanaya & Nikolai S.-Frantsus	Artyom Umrikhin (ARTIK) & Seville Velieva (SEVILLE)	TBA
Featuring other singers
2021	«Бабки есть» (clip Yurkissa)	Unknown		

== Charts ==
Year	Title	Charts								Album
Year	Title	CIS (Tophit General Top-100)	Russia (Tophit Russia Тоp-100)	Russia (Tophit Moscow Тоp-100)	Russia (Tophit Saint-Petersburg Тоp-100)	Ukraine (Tophit Ukrainian Top-100)	Ukraine (Tophit Kyiv Top-100)	Audience Choice TopHit 100	CIS (Tophit Annual Total)	Album
2014	«Половина»	80	117	100	—	78	25	6	—	Здесь и сейчас
2016	«Тебе всё можно»	27	31	34	19	132	—	13	—	Здесь и сейчас
2016	«Я твоя»	68	77	70	53	—	—	4	—	Номер 1
2016	«Не отдам» (Марсель feat. Artik & Asti)	—	—	—	—	—	—	76	—	О любви, печали и радости (album by. «Марсель»)
2017	«Неделимы»	1	1	9	—	461	937	9	—	Номер 1

== List of awards and nominations ==
2014

- Nominated by Russian MusicBox and nominated as "best promotion".

2019

- Won the "Golden Gramophone Award" за песню "Грустный дэнс" (feat Артём Качер)

2020

- Nominated for "Golden Gramophone award" for the song "Девочка, танцуй"
- Won «song of the year» for the song "Девочка, танцуй"
