= It Hurts =

It Hurts may refer to:

- "It Hurts" (Angels & Airwaves song), 2006
- "It Hurts" (Nyusha song), 2011
- "It Hurts" (Lena Philipsson song), 2004
- "It Hurts (Slow)", or "It Hurts", a song by 2NE1
- "It Hurts", a song by Tom Grennan from the album Evering Road
