= Under Hypnosis (song) =

2019 single by Artik & Asti

"Under hypnosis"

Song by Artik & Asti
- Language: Russian
- Released: March 29, 2019
- Genre: Pop
- Length: 3:29
- Label: Self Made

"Under hypnosis" (Russian: "Под гипнозом") is a song by Ukrainian pop-group Artik & Asti which debuted on their mini-album 7 (Part 1).

== History ==
At the end of 2019, the music chart Tophit published a list of the most popular songs on the radio. "Под гипнозом" took third place in the category "Best song — mixed vocals", earning a total of 715,409 listens.

== Music video ==
The music video for the song was released on 30 August 2019 on the YouTube-channel Self Made Music. The director for the video was Alan Badoev, who previously worked with artists such as Max Barskih, Elena Temnikova, Anna Sedokova, Lesha Svik and others.

== Charts ==
Chart (2020)	Peak position
Russia (МТS)	4
Russia (Odnoklassniki)	4
Russia (Zvooq.online)	3
Russia (Boom)	4
Russia (Russkoye Radio)	1
Russian chart (ТНТ Music)	1
Top chart (ТНТ Music)	3
