= Hanna (Russian singer) =

Russian singer and model (born 1991)

Hanna Ханна
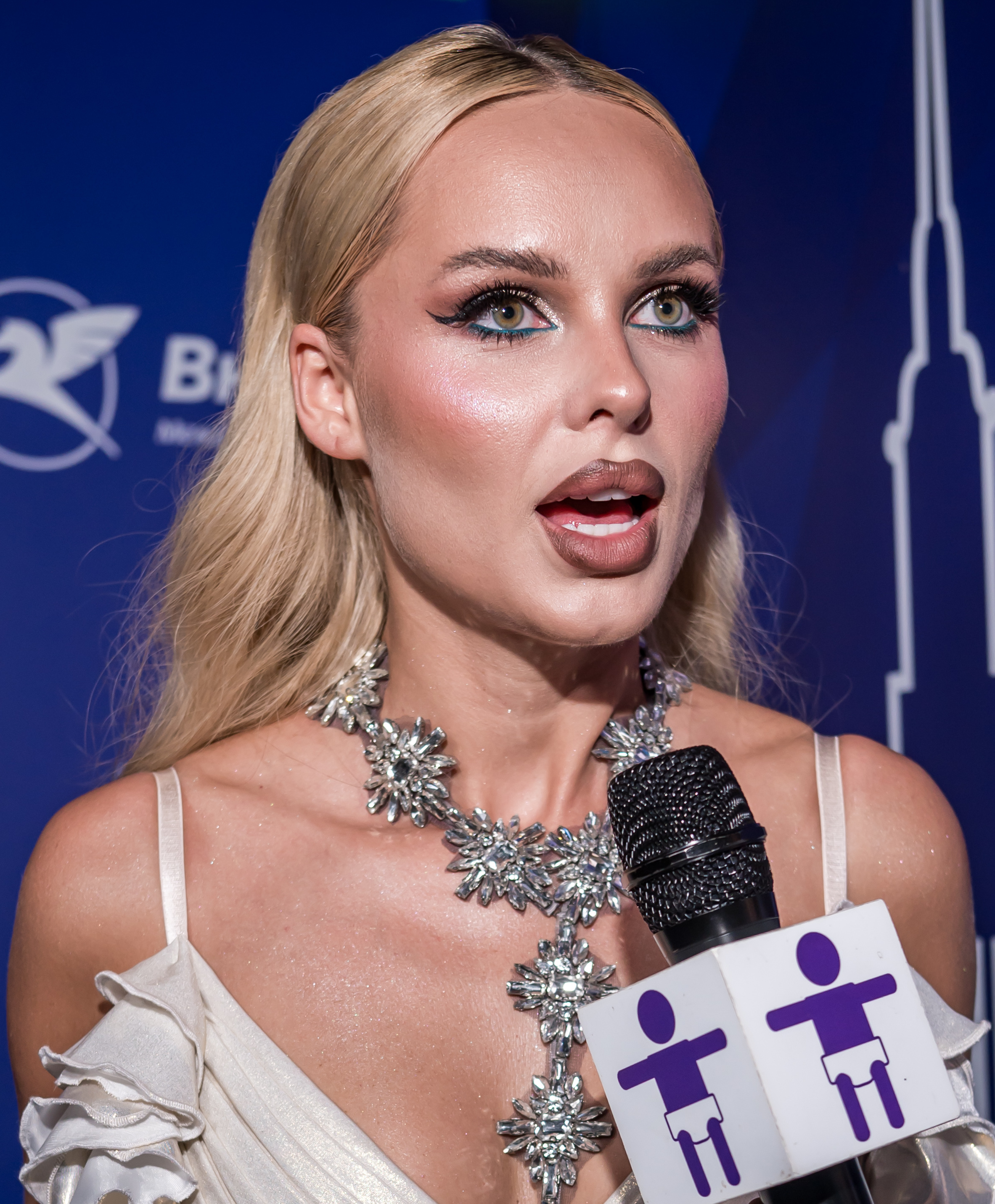
- Hanna in July 2024

Background information
- Born: Anna Vladimirovna Ivanova; 23 January 1991 (age 35); Cheboksary, Chuvash ASSR, Russian SFSR, USSR
- Genres: Pop; R&B
- Occupations: Singer; model
- Years active: 2006–present

Anna Vladimirovna Ivanova (Russian: Анна Владимировна Иванова; born 23 January 1991), known professionally as Hanna (Russian: Ханна), is a Russian singer and model.

== Biography ==
Anna Ivanova was born on 23 January 1991 in Cheboksary. As a child she wanted to become a singer. She finished music school learning piano. In 2013 she finished her studies at Saint Petersburg State University of Economics with the specialized «Economics and management at the enterprise of tourism and hotel industry».

She repeatedly won many beauty contests, including «Miss Chuvashia – 2009», «Miss Volga – 2009», «Miss Apollon – 2009», Miss Viva Volga-Don – 2010, Miss Volga International – 2010, Miss Kemer International – 2010. She was a finalist for «Miss Russia 2010».

== Personal life ==
In July 2015 the singer married the director of music label Black Star Inc., Pavel "Pasha" Kuryanov. They met when Hanna was a contestant for «Miss Kemer International – 2010», where Hanna achieved 1st place. Pavel promoted Hanna as a singer. On 3 April 2018, Hanna announced she was expecting a child. On 3 September the singer gave birth to a daughter, named Adriana. On 9 February 2023 she welcomed her next child.

== Discography ==
=== Studio albums ===
Title
Мысли. Часть 1
Information
- Release: 23 January 2018
- Label: Make It Music
- Format: Digital distribution

* Track-list
No.	Title	Length
1.	"Не вернусь"	3:08
2.	"Глаза"	3:05
3.	"Буду"	3:07
4.	"Изучай меня"	3:20
5.	"Пули"	3:37
6.	"Опять одна я"	2:49
7.	"Невиновная"	2:58
8.	"Непобедим"	2:38
9.	"Вопросов нет"	3:17
10.	"Немерено"	3:07
11.	"Потеряла голову"	3:40
12.	"Омар Хайям"	3:05
13.	"Без тебя я не могу"	4:02
14.	"Любовь-боль"	3:35
15.	"Te Amo"	2:58
Total length:		45:86

=== Mini-albums ===
Title
Чувства — EP
Information
- Released: 7 December 2022
- Label: Make It Music
- Format: Digital distribution

* Track-list
No.	Title	Length
1.	"Отвали"	2:51
2.	"Наедине"	2:37
3.	"Изучай меня"	2:49
4.	"Его глаза"	2:38
5.	"Прощай"	2:30
6.	"Fell in Love"	2:25
Total length:		14:30

=== Singles ===
- «Я просто твоя» (2013)
- «Вздохи» (2014)
- «Так и знай» (2014)
- «Знаю» (2014)
- «Скромным быть не в моде» (feat. Egor Kreed) (2014)
- «Манекен» (2014)
- «Небо» (2014)
- «Чтобы лето не кончалось» (2014)
- «Лучше нет» (2014)
- «Инстаграм» (2015)
- «Мама, я влюбилась» (2015)
- «Потеряла голову» (2015)
- «Когда он зайдёт» (2016)
- «Омар Хайям» (2016)
- «Без тебя я не могу» (2016)
- «Невиновная» (2017)
- «Te Amo» (2017)
- «Пули» (2017)
- «Не вернусь» (2018)
- «Целуемся» (2018)
- «Нарушаем правила» (feat. Luxor) (2018)
- «Поговори со мной» (2019)
- «Солнце лишь круг» (2019)
- «Музыка звучит» (2019)
- «Запрещённая любовь» (2019)
- «Трогать запрещено» (2020)
- «Не теряй» (2020)
- «Французский поцелуй» (feat. Misha Marvin) (2020)
- «Навсегда твоя» (2020)
- «Небо» (feat. Джоззи) (2020)
- «Не любовь?» (2020)
- «Статус влюблена» (2020)
- «Шанс» (feat. Зомб) (2021)
- «Весна» (2021)
- «Coco Inna» (feat. Arsenium & Tymma) (2021)
- «Сладкий туман» (2021)
- «Убью тебя» (feat. Misha Marvin) (2021)
- «Как в первый раз» (feat. Artik) (2021)
- «Time Out» (2022)
- «Девочка Рок» (2022)
- «Море» (2022)
- «Отвали» (2022)
- «Финал» (feat. Misha Marvin) (2023)

== Videoclips ==
Year	Clip	Director	Album
2013	«Я просто твоя»	Bratiya Misyura	No album
2014	«Скромным быть не в моде» (featuring Egor Kreed)	Rustam Romanov	No album
2014	«Чтобы лето не кончалось»	Rustam Romanov	No album
2014	«Лучше нет (Интернет-видео)»	Anton Trushnikov	No album
2015	«Мама, я влюбилась»	Aleksey Kupriyanov	No album
2015	«Потеряла голову»	Katya Yak	Мысли. Часть 1
2016	«Омар Хайям»	Katya Yak	Мысли. Часть 1
2016	«Без тебя я не могу»	Zaur	Мысли. Часть 1
2017	«Te Amo»	Vlad Akushevich	Мысли. Часть 1
2017	«Пули»	Vlad Akushevich	Мысли. Часть 1
2018	«Не вернусь»	Katya Yak	Мысли. Часть 1
2018	«Целуемся»	Zaur Zaseev, Pavel Hoodyakov	No album
2018	«Нарушаем правила» (featuring Luxor)	Lev Efimov	No album
2019	«Поговори со мной»	Katya Yak	No album
2019	«Солнце лишь круг»	Katya Yak	No album
2019	«Музыка звучит»	Katya Yak	No album
2020	«Трогать запрещено» (Mood Video)	Masha Zhemchuzhina	No album
2020	«Французский поцелуй» (featuring Misha Marvin)	Katya Yak	No album
2020	«Навсегда твоя»	Katya Yak	No album
2020	«Не любовь?»	Katya Yak	No album
2021	«Весна»	Katya Yak	No album
2021	«Убью тебя» (featuring Misha Marvin)	Katya Yak	No album
2022	«Как в первый раз» (feat. Artik)	Yudzhin	No album
2023	«Финал» (feat. Misha Marvin)	Katya Yak	No album

== Charts ==
Year	Title	Charts							Album
Year	Title	Russia & CIS (TopHit Total Top-100)	Russia (TopHit Moscow Top-100)	Russia (TopHit Saint Petersburg Top-100)	Ukraine (TopHit Ukrainian Top-100)	Ukraine (TopHit Kiev Top-100)	Radiochart on request TopHit 100	Russia & CIS (TopHit Yearly Total)	Album
2013	«Просто твоя»	348	–	–	–	–	311	–	Мысли. Часть 1
2014	«Скромным быть не в моде» (featuring Egor Kreed)	232	–	–	732	–	310	–	Мысли. Часть 1
2015	«Мама, я влюбилась»	74	90	90	30	65	68	–	Мысли. Часть 1
2015	«Потеряла голову»	46	51	41	582	606	8	–	Мысли. Часть 1
2016	«Омар Хайям»	30	34	33	722	705	29	–	Мысли. Часть 1
2016	«Без тебя я не могу»	71	65	73	585	729	58	–	Мысли. Часть 1

== Awards and nominations ==
Year	Award	Nominated work	Results
2016	Премия RU.TV 2016	«Свадьба года» (Hanna & Pasha)	Nominated
2016	Премия «Муз-ТВ»	«Прорыв года»	Nominated
2016	Golden Grammophone Award	«Омар Хайям»	Nominated
2016	Премия «Высшая лига»	«Омар Хайям»	Won
2017	Премия «Music Box»	«Лучшее из нового»	Won
2017	Премия «Муз-ТВ»	«Лучшее видео»	Nominated
2018	Премия «Муз-ТВ»	«Лучшее женское видео»	Nominated
2022	Golden Grammophone Award	«Море»	Won
