= Nyusha =

Russian singer (born 1990)

Nyusha Нюша
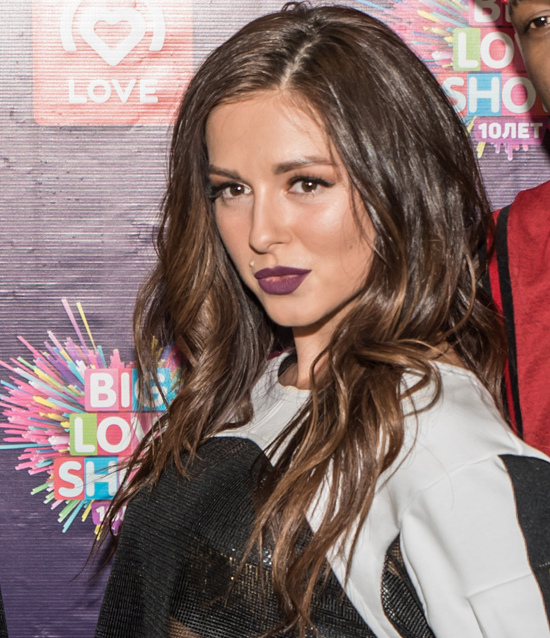
- Nyusha at the 2018 Big Love Show in Saint Petersburg

Background information
- Born: Anna Vladimirovna Shurochkina; 15 August 1990 (age 36); Moscow, Soviet Union
- Genres: Pop; dance; R&B
- Occupations: Singer; songwriter; actress; television host; activist
- Instrument: Vocals
- Years active: 2007–present
- Labels: Velvet Music; Gala Records; First Music Publishing
- Website: nyusha.ru

Anna Vladimirovna Shurochkina (Russian: Анна Влади́мировна Шу́рочкина; born 15 August 1990), better known simply as Nyusha (Russian: Нюша), is a Russian singer, songwriter, actress, activist and television host. One of the most popular musicians in contemporary Russia, Nyusha has eight number-one singles in Russia.

The daughter of former Laskovyi Mai member Vladimir Shurochkin, Nyusha began her career as a teenager, competing in New Wave 2008, where she placed seventh. Afterwards, she was signed to Warner Music Russia and released her debut studio album Choose a Miracle in 2010; the album went on to produce four number-one singles in Russia and Nyusha won Best Russian Act at the 2011 MTV Europe Music Awards. Her second studio album Union was later released in 2014, producing four more number-one singles and she winning the award for Best Russian Act again at the 2014 MTV Europe Music Awards. Nyusha is also the winner of the awards Golden Gramophone, Song of the Year, Zhara Music Awards, Zhara Media Awards, Muz-TV, RU.TV, MusicBox, Glamour Awards: Woman of the Year, Woman.ru, Fashion People Awards.

== Early life ==
Nyusha was born on 15 August 1990 into a family of musicians, her father, Vladimir Shurochkin was a former member of the musical group Laskovyi Mai (Ласковый май). Her mother, Irina Shurochkina sang in a rock band in her youth.

At age 11 she began performing on stage in the group Grizli. The group toured in Russia and Germany. At age 17 she changed her name from Anna to Nyusha.

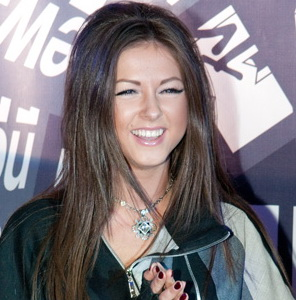
Nyusha at the celebration of the 15th anniversary of the News Block on MTV Russia, in 2011

== Career ==
=== 2007–2009: Early career ===
In 2008 Nyusha took seventh place in the international contest New Wave 2008 and also wrote the final song of the heroine in the dubbed version of the film Enchanted. In 2009, she released her first single "Howl at the Moon". Her composition won Song of the Year 2009. At the concert Europa Plus Live 2009 she introduced the new songs "Angel" in Russian and the English "Why".

=== 2010–2011: Choose a Miracle ===
In February 2010 Nyusha released her second single "Do Not Interrupt". The song became the most popular Russian hit in April 2010. On June 18, 2010, the song reached number three on the Russian digital singles chart. Nyusha was nominated as Best New Artist for the 2010 Muz-TV Awards.

In September 2010, Nyusha signed a contract with Gala Records. At the same time, the third single "Choose a Miracle" becomes number one on the Russian radio chart and debuts at the seventh position of digital singles. The debut album Choose a Miracle was released on November 11, 2010. The album reached number six on the Russian album chart and was nominated in the category Album of the Year at the 2011 Muz-TV Awards.

In 2011, she released three new singles: "Hurts", "Higher" and "Plus Près (We Can Make It Right)" with french DJ and producer Gilles Luka. On March 22, Nyusha was announced among the nominees for the 2011 Muz-TV Awards, in the nominations for Best Female Artist and Best Album. In October, Nyusha won Best Russian Act at the 2011 MTV Europe Music Awards. The editors of the Russian Billboard included her victory in the list of twenty main musical events for 2011. In December, Afisha Magazine included the song "Choose a Miracle" in the list of the main songs of 2011, and the song "Hurts" in the list of the brightest and most memorable Russian pop hits over the past 20 years.

=== 2012–2014: Union ===
In January 2012, the song "Higher" became number one on many Russian charts. On April 28, she gave the first big show at Crocus City Hall in Moscow, which was called Choose Your Miracle. During the concert, Nyusha presented three new songs: two singles "Memory" and "Alone" and a duet with her father "You Are My Life".

"Higher" won Best Song at the 2012 Muz-TV Awards. In early June, Nyusha's new single "Memory" was released, which received positive reviews from critics. On the radio, the song was first performed on June 10 on the air of the program Big Love 20 (Love Radio). "Memory" was on the number one of the chart at the request of listeners, compiled by the TopHit, continuously for 19 weeks, longer than any other song in the history.

In 2012, Nyusha took 17th place in the final list and 2nd place in the nomination Audience Interest in the list of 50 Russian celebrities annually compiled by Forbes in 2011. On August 1, 2012, RU.TV presented the nominees for the second awards ceremony. Nyusha was nominated in three categories: Best Dance Song ("Higher"), Best Song ("Higher") and Best Female Artist. According to the results of the voting, Nyusha won the nomination Best Female Artist.

At the 2012 Glamour: Woman of the Year Nyusha won the Best Artist award by performing Christina Aguilera's song "But I Am a Good Girl" from the movie Burlesque.

On November 27, the music video for "This Is the New Year" was released. The song became the soundtrack for the animated film The Snow Queen, in which Nyusha voiced Gerda. In cinemas, the film was released on December 31, 2012.

On January 28, 2013, preparations began for the new show Union, which took place on November 2 at the Crocus City Hall. In addition to the new program, a new, second in a row, studio album was presented.

On March 8, 2013, at the Valentin Yudashkin show, Nyusha performed the song "Alone", which became the second single in support of the new album. The shooting of the music video took place from March 19 to 21 in Kyiv. The official release of the song was March 18 on TopHit. The digital release of the single took place on April 15, and on May 9 a video for the song was released.

On March 21, 2013, the animated film The Croods started in cinemas, in which Nyusha voiced one of the main roles, Gip.

In June, the single "Memory" won the 2013 Muz-TV Awards in the Best Song category.

On February 22, 2014, the release of the third single "Only" and the pre-order of the second album Union took place on Russian iTunes. On April 22, 2014, Union was released, and on April 26, its presentation took place at the Arena Moscow Club. On May 19, 2014, the music video for "Only" was released. On May 31, 2014, Crocus City Hall hosted the RU.TV Award, Nyusha won the Best Female Artist.

On July 23, 2014, the song "Tsunami" was chosen as the fourth and last single from Union. In October 2014, a music video was released. The song reached number one on the radio chart and became one of Nyusha's most commercially successful singles. At the 2015 Muz-TV Awards, "Tsunami" won Best Song.

=== 2015–2017: Further success and development ===
In April 2015, Nyusha released "Where Are You, There I Am", a dance-pop single inspired by Indian culture, as well as a music video released in June. "Where Are You, There I Am" was nominated as Best Music Video and Best Song at the 2016 Muz-TV Awards, won Best Dance Video at the 2016 RU.TV Awards, Best Music Video at the 2016 MusicBox Awards and Trend of the Year at the 2025 Zhara Media Awards, ten years after the single release.

In early April 2016, Nyusha released "Kiss", a pop-rock single, that won the Golden Gramophone Award a year later.

On November 2, 2016, Nyusha's third big show, 9 Lives, took place at Crocus City Hall, where new songs intended for the third studio album were presented. At the end of November, the single "To Love You" was released, which was officially released in English in March 2017 under the title "Always Need You".

Nyusha performed the song "I'm Not Afraid" for the first time on Europa Plus Live 2017. In October 2017, the maxi-single "I’m Not Afraid" was released, and in November a music video was premiered, directed by Sergey Solodky.

=== 2018–2019: Career pause and return ===
On January 26, 2018, the single "Night" premiered, and a music video was released in February. "Night" became one of the most popular Russian radio hits of 2018 and won Best Song of the Year, Female Vocals at the 2019 TopHit Awards.

In June 2018, Arash, Nyusha, Pitbull and Blanco presented their version of the football anthem of the FIFA World Cup, releasing the single and music video "Goalie Goalie".

July 10, 2018 it became known that Nyusha takes a break in her career for the first time in ten years due to pregnancy.

On September 21, 2018, Nyusha releases the lyrical single "I Melt", and on September 25 a music video in which she shares touching ultrasound footage.

On April 29, 2019, Nyusha returns and launches a digital project in conjunction with the cosmetics brand Artistry. Fans of the singer chose a new style and song, which will be released after the completion of the project. Voting consisted of four stages: makeup, hairstyle, clothing and song.

On May 31, 2019, the mood video and promo single "I'm Looking For Him" is released exclusively for VK.

On September 13, 2019, Nyusha and Artyom Kacher release the song "Between Us". On September 27, 2019, a new version of the song was also presented. On October 23, 2019, a music video in the style of the 2000s, directed by Eugene, was released on the original version of the song.

=== 2020–2021: Solaris Es ===
In January 2020, Nyusha became the advertising face of Avon and presented a cover and music video for Natalia Vetlitskaya's song "Look Me into the Eyes" — "Bye Bye, Exes".

On World Earth Day, the first Glamour Eco Awards took place, where Nyusha became an activist and ambassador of the environmental project for the collection and processing of recyclables "Sobirator".

On April 9, 2020, it became known that Nyusha and her former lover Egor Kreed unexpectedly teamed up to release a collaboration song "Mr. & Mrs. Smith". On June 29, 2020, the mood video is released, and on December 9, 2020, the music video is released.

On September 4, 2020, the single "Drunk Thoughts" is released. From the music video, which was released on the same day, Nyusha created an art project.

Nyusha's third studio album, Solaris Es, was released on May 29, 2020. Music videos were released for each new song, combined into one musical film Solaris Es Spiritual Journey. The album has been working on for six years.

"Breathe, Love, Appreciate" became the fourth single from the album on October 29, 2020. On December 9, 2020, a music video was released with blogger Anastasia Radzinskaya (Like Nastya).

On February 19, 2021, a remix and a new video "Dirty Dancing" with LSP were released for the song "Drunk Thoughts". Nyusha and Oleg also launched a challenge on TikTok in support of the single.

In July 2021, Nyusha releases the single "Sky Knows", and on July 21, 2021, a music video with dancer Anton Panufnik (winner of the show Dancing: Battle of the Seasons), in which viewers learn that Nyusha is expecting her second child.

=== 2022–present ===
On March 17, 2023, the remake of "Choose a Miracle" with Arash was released. On October 13, 2023, Nyusha officially signed a contract with the Russian music label Velvet Music, and on November 24, 2023, the single "Again" was released. On December 15, 2023, the single "Russian Girl" is released.

In December 2023, Nyusha performed a song Bagt nury in Turkmen language at a concert in Winter Sports Complex Ashgabat. During the concert, a ceremony was held to award her the honorary title "Honored Artist of Turkmenistan".

At the ceremony The EMIGALA 2024 Fashion & Beauty Awards in Dubai, Nyusha performed the new song "Supermodels" and received an award in the nomination Artist In Fashion Awards (Fashion Artist of the Year).

Rakhim and Nyusha released the single "Bella Hadid," a remix of "Choose a Miracle", which was released on August 2, 2024.

On her birthday, August 15, 2024, Nyusha released a single in English and the music video "Wrong Radio" as a gift to fans. On September 20, 2024, the single and music video "Strong Girls" were released.

In November 2024, Nyusha became a member of the jury of the Green Prize of the Russian Environmental Operator (REO), where, together with other members of the jury, she evaluated environmental projects. In December, Nyusha received an award as the "Ambassador of the Green Prize".

Nyusha and Andro released their single "Crystal" on February 14, 2025.

In March 2025, at the Victoria Award, Nyusha premiered the single "Bad Weather", a remake from the 1983 film Mary Poppins, Goodbye, to verses by Mikhail Gutseriev, music by Maksim Dunayevsky and ChinKong (Vladimir Chinyaev).

Nyusha released the single "Amore" on April 25, 2025, and a music video was released in early 2026. Nyusha and Rakhim released their second collaboration, "Don't Be Afraid", which was released on June 27, 2025. On October 24, 2025, the single "Poisonous" was released.

The first song released in 2026 was "Wake Up", recorded with Lesha Svik. In March 2026, Nyusha released a cover of Uma2rman's song "Everything Will Work Out" for the tribute album Stars Count Us, Part II.

== Television ==
In 2007, she won the STS Lights Up a Superstar television contest, performing Bianka's song "There Were Dances", Maxim Fadeev's song "Dancing On Glass", a cover version of the Ranetki Girls group song "I Loved You", "London Bridge" by Fergie, "Lullaby" by Polina Gagarina and "Hurt" by Christina Aguilera.

Since April 21, 2012 Nyusha has become a regular television host of TopHit chart on the Muz-TV channel.

She appeared in the fourth season of ice show contest Ice Age with competitive ice dancer Maxim Shabalin. As part of one of their performances, she presented the single "Only", released in 2014.

In February 2017, she joined as a coach of the fourth season of The Voice Kids. Her team took the third place in the final.

In November 2017, Nyusha became the jury of the vocal show Success on the STS with Philip Kirkorov and Slava KPSS.

In 2025, together with her sister Maria Shurochkina, she became the winner of the second season of the TNT reality competition Treasures of the Emperor, the Russian adaptation of The Amazing Race.

== Personal life ==
In 2017, she married Igor Sivov in the Maldives and became stepmother to his two children from a previous marriage. The couple have a daughter born in 2018. Her name is Simba (Seraphima). In July 2021 Nyusha announced a second pregnancy. Their son Saffron was born December 14, 2021. In March 2022, Nyusha's family left for the UAE (Dubai). In 2024, she divorced with her husband.

== Discography ==
=== Albums ===
Title	Details
Выбирать чудо (Choose a Miracle)	Released: 12 July 2010; Label: Gala Records; Format: CD, DVD, Digital Distribution
Объединение (Union)	Released: 22 April 2014; Label: First Music Publishing House; Format: CD, Digital Distribution
Solaris Es	Released: 16 October 2020; Label: Nyusha; Format: Digital Distribution

=== Singles ===
Title	Year	Peak chart positions							Album
Title	Year	RUS Radio	UKR Radio	LAT Radio	RUS Golden Gramophone	RUS VK Music	RUS Yandex Music	RUS Apple Music	Album
"Вою на луну" ("Howl at the Moon")	2009	37	—	11	15	×	×	×	Выбирать чудо (Choose a Miracle)
"Не перебивай" ("Do Not Interrupt")	2010	1	—	—	12	×	×	×	Выбирать чудо (Choose a Miracle)
"Выбирать чудо" ("Choose a Miracle")	2010	1	4	7	1	×	×	×	Выбирать чудо (Choose a Miracle)
"Plus Près (We Can Make It Right)" (with Gilles Luka)	2010	62	—	—	—	×	×	×	Ici Ensemble
"Больно" ("Hurts")	2011	1	3	5	8	×	×	×	Выбирать чудо (Choose a Miracle)
"Выше" ("Higher")	2011	1	3	7	2	×	×	×	Выбирать чудо (Choose a Miracle)
"Воспоминание" ("Memory")	2012	1	1	11	1	×	×	×	Объединение (Union)
"Это Новый год" ("This Is the New Year")	2012	22	6	—	—	×	44	×	Объединение (Union)
"Наедине" ("Alone")	2013	1	3	9	1	×	×	×	Объединение (Union)
"Только" ("Only")	2014	1	10	—	1	×	×	×	Объединение (Union)
"Цунами" ("Tsunami")	2014	1	12	—	1	×	×	×	Объединение (Union)
"Где ты, там я" ("Where Are You, There I Am")	2015	13	45	—	1	19	48	21	Non-album singles
"Целуй" ("Kiss")	2016	30	—	—	3	×	—	—	Non-album singles
"Тебя любить" ("Always Need You")	2017	18	—	—	6	×	2	—	Non-album singles
"Не боюсь" ("I'm Not Afraid")	2017	38	—	—	—	×	—	—	Non-album singles
"Ночь" ("Night")	2018	2	—	—	6	×	3	26	Non-album singles
"Goalie Goalie" (with Arash, Pitbull & Blanco)	2018	170	—	—	—	×	25	126	Non-album singles
"Таю" ("I Melt")	2018	65	—	—	—	58	23	100	Solaris Es
"Я ищу его" ("I'm Looking For Him")	2019	—	—	—	—	—	—	—	Solaris Es
"Между нами" ("Between Us") (with Artyom Kacher)	2019	219	—	—	—	—	84	102	Solaris Es
"Мr. & Mrs. Smith" (with Egor Kreed)	2020	53	—	—	—	4	16	2	58
"Пьяные мысли" ("Drunk Thoughts")	2020	380	—	—	—	—	—	—	Solaris Es
"Дыши, люби, цени" ("Breathe, Love, Appreciate")	2020	350	—	—	—	—	—	135	Solaris Es
"Грязные танцы" ("Dirty Dancing") (with LSP)	2021	102	—	—	—	29	—	60	Non-album singles
"Небо знает" ("Sky Knows")	2021	298	—	—	—	—	—	—	Non-album singles
"Выбирать чудо (Remake)" ("Choose a Miracle (Remake)") (with Arash)	2023	—	—	—	—	—	—	—	Non-album singles
"Заново" ("Again")	2023	50	—	—	19	—	—	—	Non-album singles
"Русская девушка" ("Russian Girl")	2023	—	—	—	—	—	—	—	Non-album singles
"Цунами" ("Tsunami") (with AUM RAA)	2024	—	—	—	—	—	—	—	Non-album singles
"Сверху вниз" ("Top To Bottom")	2024	86	—	—	—	—	—	—	Non-album singles
"Bella Hadid" (with Rakhim)	2024	—	—	—	—	48	26	170	Non-album singles
"Wrong Radio"	2024	—	—	—	—	—	—	—	Non-album singles
"Сильные девочки" ("Strong Girls")	2024	56	—	—	—	—	—	—	Non-album singles
"Не перебивай 2.0" ("Do Not Interrupt 2.0") (with Ice Lo & ayv1o)	2025	—	—	—	—	37	32	—	Non-album singles
"Хрусталь" ("Crystal") (with Andro)	2025	—	—	—	—	—	—	—	Non-album singles
"Цунами" ("Tsunami") (with Leonid Rudenko & DILARA)	2025	—	—	—	—	—	—	—	Non-album singles
"Непогода" ("Bad Weather") (with ChinKong)	2025	28	—	—	—	—	—	—	Non-album singles
"Amore"	2025	50	—	—	—	—	—	—	Non-album singles
"Не бойся" ("Don't Be Afraid") (with Rakhim)	2025	74	—	—	—	—	—	—	Non-album singles
"Целуй 2.0" ("Kiss 2.0") (with Rakhim & ayv1o)	2025	—	—	—	—	27	—	—	Non-album singles
"Не бойся 2.0" ("Don't Be Afraid 2.0") (with Rakhim & ayv1o)	2025	—	—	—	—	—	—	—	Non-album singles
"Ядовитая" ("Poisonous")	2025	143	—	—	—	—	—	—	Non-album singles
"Пробуди" ("Wake Up") (with Lesha Svik)	2026	—	—	—	—	38	—	—	Non-album singles
"Всё получится" ("Everything Will Work Out") (Uma2rman cover)	2026	—	—	—	—	—	—	—	Звёзды считают нас, часть II (Stars Count Us, Part II)
The "—" symbol signifies that the song was missing from the chart; "×" indicates that the chart was inactive

=== Music videos ===
Year	Song	Director
2009	"Вою на луну" ("Howl at the Moon")	Bahodyr Yuldashev
2010	"Не перебивай" ("Do Not Interrupt")	Bahodyr Yuldashev
2010	"Выбирать чудо" ("Choose a Miracle")	Bahodyr Yuldashev
2011	"Plus Près (We Can Make It Right)" (with Gilles Luka)	Harvey Kahn
2011	"Больно" ("Hurts")	Pavel Hudyakov
2011	"Выше" ("Higher")	Bahodyr Yuldashev
2012	"Воспоминание" ("Memory")	Alexey Golubev
2012	"Это Новый год" ("This Is the New Year")	Pavel Vladimirskiy
2013	"Наедине" ("Alone")	Sergey Pertsev
2014	"Только" ("Only")	Natella Krapivina
2014	"Цунами" ("Tsunami")	Bahodyr Yuldashev
2015	"Где ты, там я" ("Where Are You, There I Am")	Sergey Solodky
2016	"Целуй" ("Kiss")	Sergey Solodky
2017	"Тебя любить" ("Always Need You")	Dmitriy Bushuev
2017	"Не боюсь" ("I'm Not Afraid")	Sergey Solodky
2018	"Ночь" ("Night")	Sergey Solodky
2018	"Goalie Goalie" (with Arash, Pitbull & Blanco)	Farbood Khoshtinat
2018	"Таю" ("I Melt")	Vladimir Besedin
2019	"Я ищу его" ("I'm Looking For Him") (Mood Video)	Ines Polskih
2019	"Между нами" ("Between Us") (with Artyom Kacher)	Yudzhin
2019	"Между нами" ("Between Us") (Ice Lyrical Version) (with Artyom Kacher)	Ines Polskih
2020	"Пьяные мысли" ("Drunk Thoughts")	Maxim Sokolov
2020	"Дыши, люби, цени" ("Breathe, Love, Appreciate")	Karina Kandel
2020	"Mr. & Mrs. Smith" (with Egor Kreed)	Alexander Romanov
2021	"Грязные танцы" ("Dirty Dancing") (with LSP)	Ines Polskih & Leo Salif
2021	"Небо знает" ("Sky Knows")	Gex
2024	"Заново" ("Again") (Mood Video)	Unknown
2024	"Bella Hadid" (with Rakhim)	Mikhail Kumarov & Ramzat Makhametov
2024	"Wrong Radio"	Ines Polskih
2024	"Сильные девочки" ("Strong Girls")	Maxim Voronchuk
2025	"Не бойся" ("Don't Be Afraid") (Mood Video) (with Rakhim)	Unknown
2025	"Непогода" ("Bad Weather") (with ChinKong)	Sasha Saharnaya
2026	"Amore"	Unknown

== Honours and awards ==
=== Titles ===
- Honored Artist of Turkmenistan (2023)
