= Solaris Es =

2020 album by Nyusha

Solaris Es is the third studio album by Russian singer Nyusha, released on 16 October 2020. The album name comes from the Latin Solaris Es — solar art. The album has 19 songs. Nyusha was the producer and songwriter for her own album. Each track came with its own visualizer, along with one musical film «Solaris Es Spiritual Journey», filled with various easter eggs. The film's directors were Ines Po and Valeriya Masalevich.

== Singles ==
- «Таю» — the first single of the album, released on 21 September 2018.
- «Между нами» — the only duet work of Nyusha with Артём Качер on the album, released on 13 September 2019.
- «Пьяные мысли» — The third single of the album, published on 4 September 2020. In the video, which was released on that day, Nyusha made an art project. On 19 February 2021 a remix and a new video was titled «Грязные танцы» with ЛСП.
- «Дыши, люби, цени» — the fourth single, released together with the album. On 29 October 2020 during the online concert «OK На связи!» the singer announced that the track was the album's next single. On 9 December 2020 a video was released, shot by vlogger and YouTuber Anastasiya Radzinskaya (Like Nastya).

== List of songs ==
Information from Tidal.

No.	Title	Writer(s)	Length
1.	"Entrance"	Dimitriy Vladislavovich Agafonov	0:56
2.	"Капкан"	Nyusha Vladimirovna Shurochkina	3:14
3.	"По факту в моменте больно"	Shurochkina, Agafonov	0:53
4.	"Я ищу его"	Shurochkina	3:09
5.	"Похоже на пульс"	Shurochkina	0:36
6.	"Хочу"	Shurochkina	2:44
7.	"Кто решает?"	Shurochkina, Agafonov	0:41
8.	"Программируй"	Shurochkina	3:20
9.	"Безобидна"	Shurochkina	3:46
10.	"Не ревную"	Shurochkina	3:20
11.	"Летать далеко"	Shurochkina	3:10
12.	"Simba"	Shurochkina, Agafonov	0:46
13.	"Дыши, люби, цени"	Shurochkina, Anatoliy Anatolivich Alekseev	3:40
14.	"Между нами" (feat. Артём Качер)	Shurochkina, Artyom Arestakovich Kacharyan	3:36
15.	"Таю"	Shurochkina	3:19
16.	"Mood"	Agafonov	0:42
17.	"Пьяные мысли"	Shurochkina	2:48
18.	"Таю" (Remix)	Shurochkina	3:12
19.	"Exit"	Agafonov	1:06
Total length:			47:48

== Recording members ==
- Nyusha Shurochkina — producer, vocals, backing vocalist, composer, songwriter
- Dimitriy Agafonov — composer
- Aleksandr Kryukov — sound producer, composer
- Anatoliy Alekseev — composer
