= Artyom Kacher =

Russian singer (born 1988)

Artyom Kacher Артём Ка́чер
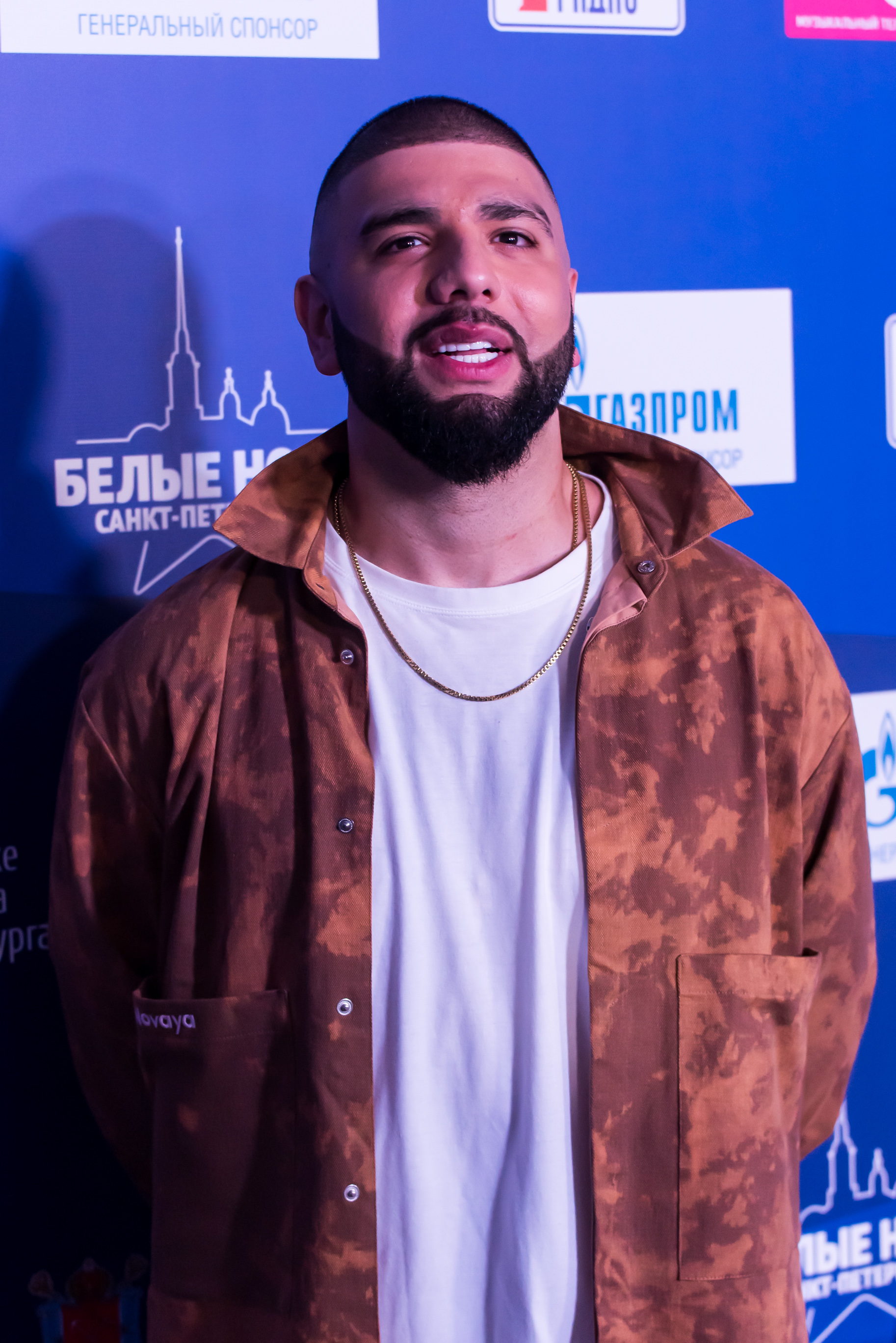

Background information
- Born: Artyom Arestakovich Kacharyan; August 17, 1988 (age 38); Ordzhonikidze, Russian SFSR, Soviet Union (now Vladikavkaz, Russia)
- Occupations: Singer; rapper
- Years active: 2015-present
- Label: Self Made Music

Artyom Kacher (Russian: Артём Ка́чер, also transcribed as "Artem Kacher"), born Artyom Arestakovich Kacharyan (Russian: Артём Ареста́кович Качаря́н; 17 August 1988) is a Russian singer and rapper.

== Discography ==
=== Studio albums ===
Title	Information	Notes
Один на один	Release: 22 February 2019; Label: Self Made Music; Format: Digital Distribution	* Track-list: No. / Title / Length; 1. / "Миллион" / 1:54; 2. / "Вайб" (feat. Artik) / 2:49; 3. / "220" / 3:27; 4. / "Выстрел" / 3:22; 5. / "Джоинт" / 3:07; 6. / "Плюс на минус" (feat. SuperSonya) / 3:22; 7. / "Наркотик" / 2:51; 8. / "Мимо тебя" (feat. Жак Энтони) / 4:12; 9. / "Сильнее дыма" / 3:23; 10. / "Фиаско" / 3:32; 11. / "Бэйба" (feat. Artik) / 4:16; 12. / "Я рядом" / 3:30; 13. / "Flashback" / 3:23; Total length: / / 40:68
Буду тебя любить	Release: 26 May 2020; Label: Self Made Music; Format: Digital Distribution	* Track-list: No. / Title / Length; 1. / "Интро" / 1:29; 2. / "Иду" / 3:40; 3. / "Энергия солнца" / 3:53; 4. / "Ночное шоссе" / 4:04; 5. / "А может быть" / 3:46; 6. / "Буду тебя любить" (Interlude) / 0:59; 7. / "Буду тебя любить" / 3:54; 8. / "Нескромно" / 3:14; 9. / "Делаю больно" / 3:12; 10. / "Мечтали мы" / 2:57; 11. / "Каждый день" / 3:38; 12. / "Больше, чем дружба" (feat. Artik) / 3:05; 13. / "Моё признание" / 3:03; 14. / "Ещё чуть-чуть" / 2:32; 15. / "Время" (Аутро) / 1:49; Total length: / / 41:95
КАЧЕР	Release: 28 January 2021; Label: Self Made Music; Format: Digital Distribution	* Track-list: No. / Title / Length; 1. / "Это стильно" / 2:43; 2. / "В ритме танца" / 3:44; 3. / "Мои раны" / 3:22; 4. / "Тело как гитара" / 3:03; 5. / "Дуру люблю" / 2:10; 6. / "Стреляй" / 2:58; 7. / "Молча" (with Artik & Asti) / 4:04; 8. / "Дикая" / 3:18; 9. / "Виноват" / 3:39; 10. / "Так как я" (with Artik) / 3:04; 11. / "Сука" / 2:53; 12. / "Давай забудем" (feat. TARAS) / 3:48; 13. / "Дикая" (ICEDADDYKILLA Remix) / 3:24; 14. / "Молча" (ICEDADDYKILLA Remix) / 3:22; Total length: / / 42:92
Девочка, не плачь	Release: 27 January 2022; Label: Self Made Music; Format: Digital Distribution	* Track-list: No. / Title / Length; 1. / "Девочка, не плачь" / 2:51; 2. / "Пьёшь и танцуешь" / 2:41; 3. / "Из-за тебя" / 2:34; 4. / "Один на один" (Interlude) / 1:24; 5. / "Один на один" / 3:07; 6. / "До луны и обратно" / 2:42; 7. / "100 проблем" / 2:58; 8. / "Материк" (feat. Ani Lorak) / 2:35; 9. / "Последний поцелуй" / 2:52; Total length: / / 21:44
Февраль	Release: 3 February 2023; Label: Self Made Music; Format: Digital Distribution	* Track-list: No. / Title / Length; 1. / "Февраль" / 3:07; 2. / "Пока ты с ним" / 2:58; 3. / "Перегорело" / 2:49; 4. / "Терапия-любовь" / 2:48; 5. / "Аномалия" / 2:18; 6. / "Если" (with Misha Marvin) / 3:18; 7. / "Вера, надежда & love" / 3:22; 8. / "Я не Я" / 1:56; 9. / "Я не Я" (epilogue) / 1:03; 10. / "Город помнит" / 2:32; Total length: / / 24:11

=== Mini-albums ===
Title
DRAMA ― EP
Information
- Release: 1 July 2021
- Label: Self Made Music
- Format: Digital Distribution
Notes

Track-list
No.	Title	Length
1.	"100 проблем"	2:58
2.	"Всё это ты"	3:03
3.	"Пьёшь и танцуешь"	2:41
4.	"P.S."	2:45
5.	"На берегу" (Interlude)	0:52
6.	"На берегу" (feat. Isupov)	2:35
Total length:		13:34

=== Singles ===
Year	Title	Charts			Album	Notes
Year	Title	RU			Album	Notes
Year	Title	TopHit Top Radio & YouTube Hits	TopHit Top Radio Hits	TopHit Top YouTube Hits	Album	Notes
2016	«Яд»	199	138	—	digital single	
2017	«Энергия солнца»	509	358	—	Буду тебя любить	album single
2017	«Неправильно»	—	—	—	digital single	
2018	«Люби меня»	—	—	—	digital single	
2018	«Голая»	752	—	—	digital single	
2019	«Мимо тебя» (feat. Жак Энтони)	—	—	—	Один на один	album single
2019	«Бэйба» (feat. Artik)	—	—	—	Один на один	album single
2019	«Я рядом»	—	—	—	Один на один	album single
2019	«Между нами» (with Nyusha)	219	331	70	Solaris Es (album of Nyusha)	album single
2019	«Одинокая луна»	10	10	88	digital single	
2020	«Давай забудем» (feat. TARAS)	—	—	—	КАЧЕР	album single
2020	«Твой первый»	105	92	—	без альбома	digital single
2020	«Под дождём» (Irina Dubtsova)	110	88	—	без альбома	digital single
2020	«Chica Bonita» (with Artik & Marvin)	—	—	—	без альбома	digital single
2020	«Дикая»	203	234	—	КАЧЕР	album single
2021	«Дуру люблю»	—	—	—	КАЧЕР	album single
2021	«Стреляй» (with КУЧЕР)	—	—	—	digital single	
2021	«100 проблем»	—	—	—	DRAMA ― EP / Девочка, не плачь	album single
2021	«Пьёшь и танцуешь»	—	—	—	DRAMA ― EP / Девочка, не плачь	album single
2021	«Дружба» (Из к/ф «Друг на продажу»)	—	—	—	digital single	
2021	«Девочка не плачь»	—	—	—	Девочка, не плачь	album single
2022	«3 слова»	—	—	—	digital single	
2022	«Материк» (feat. Ani Lorak)	—	—	—	Девочка, не плачь	album
2022	«Пока ты с ним»	—	—	—	Февраль	digital single
2022	«Если» (with Misha Marvin)	—	—	—	Февраль	digital single
2022	«Перегорело»	—	—	—	Февраль	digital single
2023	«Февраль»	—	—	—	Февраль	album single

=== Singles featuring Artyom Kacher ===
Year	Title	Charts			Album	Примечания
Year	Title	RU			Album	Примечания
Year	Title	TopHit Top Radio & YouTube Hits	TopHit Top Radio Hits	TopHit Top YouTube Hits	Album	Примечания
2018	«ДНК» (Джиган feat. Артём Качер)	1	1	8	digital single	
2019	"Грустный дэнс" (Artik & Asti feat. Артём Качер)	1	1	2	7 (Part 1)	album single

== Music videos ==
=== Videoclips ===
Year	Title	Director
2015	«Энергия солнца»	Unknown
2016	«Яд»	Artyom Umrikhin
2017	«Неправильно»	Yuriy Dvizhon
2018	«Люби меня»	Gevorkyan A.
2018	«ДНК» (with GeeGun)	GeeGun
2019	«Голая»	Andrei Lisanov
2019	«Мимо тебя» (with Жак-Энтони)	Jacques Antony & Andrei Isakin
2019	«Грустный дэнс» (with Artik & Asti)	VISNU
2019	«Бэйба» (with Artik)	Artik & Dannykekspro
2019	«Я рядом»	Warner Music Russia
2019	«Между нами» (with Nyusha)	Yudzhin
2019	«Одинокая луна»	Yura Katinsky
2020	«Твой первый»	Katya Yak
2020	«Под дождём» (with Irina Dubtsova)	Aleksandr Igudin
2020	«Дикая»	Elvin Fomin
2021	«Дуру люблю»	Oven
2021	«100 проблем»	Masha Zhemchuzhina
2021	«Пьёшь и танцуешь»	Askar Uzabaev
2021	«Дружба» (Из к/ф «Друг на продажу»)	Aleksandr Danilov
2021	«Девочка, не плачь»	Unknown
2022	«3 слова»	Georgiy Matsukatov
2022	«Материк» (with Ani Lorak)	Yudzhin
2022	«Если» (with Misha Marvin)	Sasha Li

== Awards and nominations ==
Year	Ceremony	Nomination	Nominee / Nominated work	Results	Ref.
2018	Golden Gramophone		GeeGun feat. Артем Качер — «ДНК»	Won	
2019	Премия Муз-ТВ 2019	Best Duet	GeeGun feat. Артем Качер — «ДНК»	Nominated	
2019	Golden Gramophone		Artik &amp; Asti / Артём Качер — «Грустный дэнс»	Won	
2020	«Новое радио Awards»	Best Collaboration	Artik &amp; Asti vs Артём Качер — «Грустный дэнс»	Won	
2020	Zhara Music Awards 2020	Collaboration of the year	Artik &amp; Asti / Артём Качер — «Грустный дэнс»	Won	
2020	Golden Gramophone 2020		Артём Качер — «Одинокая луна»	Won	
2021	Golden Gramophone		Артём Качер и Ирина Дубцова — «Под дождём»	Won	
