= Sad Dance (song) =

2019 song by Artik & Asti

Song by Artik & Asti feat. Artyom Kacher
- Language: Russian
- Released: February 14, 2019
- Length: 3:37
- Label: Warner Music Russia

"Sad Dance" (Russian: Грустный дэнс) is a song by Ukrainian pop-group Artik & Asti featuring Russian singer Artyom Kacher, released on 14 February 2019 through the label Warner Music Group. The song debuted on the group's EP 7 (Part 1).

== Music video ==
On 29 March 2019, a music video for the song was released. The Internet edition of ТНТ Music placed the video at 11th for best videos of 2019.

== Success ==
After its release, the song began increasing in popularity, landing on many charts.

=== Awards and nominations ===
Year	Ceremony	Rating	Results	Ref.
2019	Новое радио Awards	Best collaboration	Won	
2021	Муз-ТВ	Best collaboration	Nominated	

=== Final lists ===
Year	Platform	Rating	Place	Ref.
2019	Yandex Music	Top-10 songs	3	
2019	Apple Music	Top-10 songs in Russia	1	
2019	VK	Top-30 tracks	1	
2019	ТНТ Music	Best video of 2019	11	

=== Yearly charts ===
Chart (2019)	Peak position
Russia (Top Radio & YouTube Hits)	1
Ukraine (Top Radio & YouTube Hits)	5
Russia (Top YouTube Hits)	9
Ukraine (Top YouTube Hits)	7
