= Artik (singer) =

Ukrainian singer & composer (born 1985)

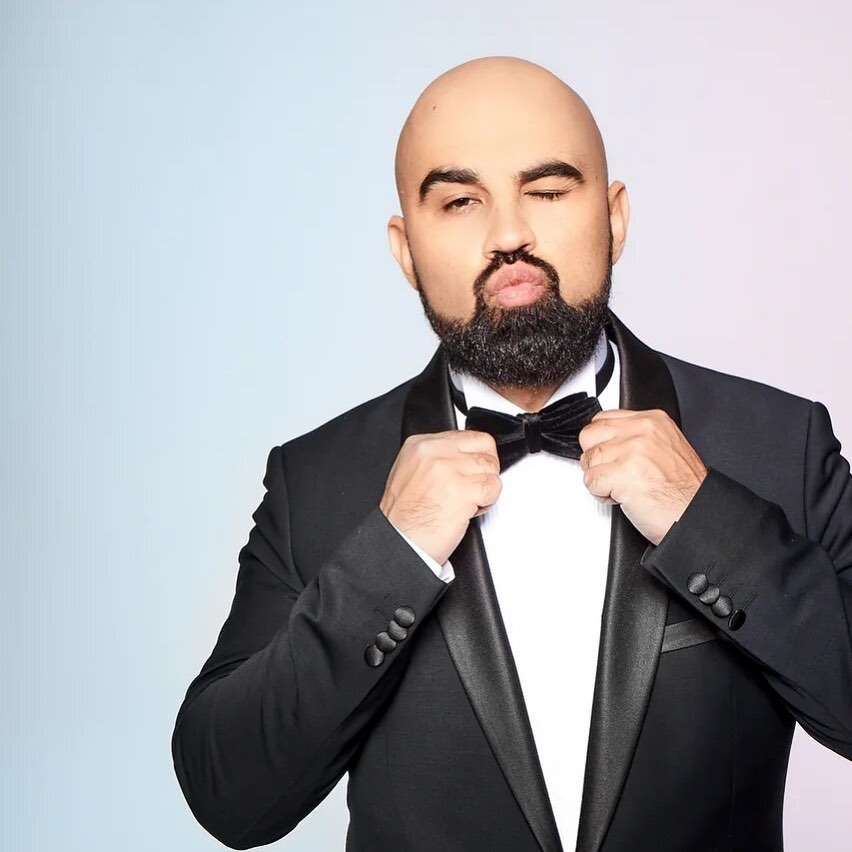
- Artik in 2020

Background information
- Born: Artem Ihorovych Umrikhin; December 9, 1985 (age 40); Zaporizhzhia, Ukrainian SSR, Soviet Union
- Genres: Pop rap; hip hop; R&B
- Occupations: Singer; songwriter; producer; composer; rapper; director
- Member of: Artik & Asti

Artyom Igorevich Umrikhin (Russian: Артём Игоревич Умрихин; Ukrainian: Артем Ігорович Умріхін, romanized: Artem Ihorovych Umrikhin; born 9 December 1985), better known as Artik, is a Ukrainian singer, director, producer, and composer. He is the recipient of "Pesnya goda 2011", as well as "Golden Gramophone 2011" for the music to the song "Отпусти" by GeeGun & Yulia Savicheva.

== Biography ==
Umrikhin wrote many compositions, including "Над землей" (T-Killah & Nastya Kochetkova), "Отпусти" (GeeGun & Yulia Savicheva), "Ты рядом" (GeeGun & Jeanna Friske), and "Домой" (Ivan Dorn). He's also worked with Dima Bilan, Anna Sedokova, DJ Smash, Leonid Rudenko, and Evgeny Milkovsky (Nervy).

== Musical career ==
In 2005 the group was nominated "best RnB/HipHop group" by the Ukrainian music award "ShowBiz AWARD".

=== Artik and Asti ===
In 2010 Artik listened to the work of an unknown vocalist at the time, Asti. He launched the project «Artik & Asti», continuing his creative activity. The team gained popularity with the release of the single «Моя последняя надежда». The video for the song went on YouTube and in a few months garnered about one and a half million views.

In January 2023 Artem Umrikhin emigrated from Russia to the United Arab Emirates.

== Personal life ==
Artik's wife, Ramina Umrikhina (Ezdovska), is of Romani descent. His son, Itan, was born in 2017 in Miami and, therefore, has United States citizenship. On 9 August 2019 his daughter Naomi was born.

== Discography ==
- 2007 — "Копий нет» with the group "Караты"
- 2009 — "Основы" with the group "Караты"
- 2010 — "Не альбом" as ARTIK
- 2013 — "#РайОдинНаДвоих" with ARTIK & ASTI
- 2015 (February) — "Здесь и сейчас" with ARTIK & ASTI
- 2017 (April) — "Номер 1" with ARTIK & ASTI
- 2019 (March) — "7 (Part 1)" with ARTIK & ASTI
- 2020 (February) — «7 (Part 2)» with ARTIK & ASTI
- 2021 (March) — "Миллениум" with ARTIK & ASTI
- 2021 (July) — "Миллениум Х" with ARTIK & ASTI
