= 7 (Part 2) =

2020 EP by Artik & Asti

7 (Part 2) (Russian: «7 (Часть 2)») — is the second Mini-album (EP) by Ukrainian group Artik & Asti, released on 7 February 2020 through the record label Self Made.

== Singles ==
On 7 February 2020, at the same time as the EP's release, the duo released a music video for the song «Девочка, танцуй», which eventually became the lead single of the album. The director of the video was Alan Badoev.

=== Nominations ===
7 (Part 2) was «Альбомом года» ("album of the year") according to SberZvuka, and also was one of the top 3 most listened albums on VK. The song «Девочка, танцуй» at that moment was nominated at the «Жара Music Awards».

== List of songs ==
According to Apple Music:

| No. | Title | Length |
|---|---|---|
| 1. | "Последний поцелуй" | 3:12 |
| 2. | "Все мимо" | 3:48 |
| 3. | "Чувства" | 3:57 |
| 4. | "Девочка танцуй" | 4:21 |
| 5. | "Обесточено" | 3:15 |
| 6. | "Крылья" | 3:30 |
| 7. | "Незаменимы" | 3:27 |
| Total length: | | 24:10 |
