= It Hurts (Nyusha song) =

Single by Nyusha

from the album Choose Your Miracle
- Released: February 16, 2011
- Recorded: 2010
- Genre: hip hop, pop ballad
- Length: 3:31
- Label: Gala Records
- Songwriter: Nyusha
- Producers: Nyusha, Vladimir Shurochkin, Vlad Strekalin

Nyusha singles chronology
"Choose Your Miracle" (2010)	"It Hurts" (2011)	"Plus pres (We can make it right)" (2011)

Music video
- "It Hurts" on YouTube

It Hurts (Russian: Больно) is a song written by Russian singer Nyusha. Produced the most artist, Vladimir Shurochkin and Vlad Strekalin composition was released as the fourth single from her singer's debut album Choose Your Miracle (2010).

Recorded in the genre of pop ballads, It Hurts incorporates elements of dance music and hip-hop. According to the singer, the composition was written under the impression of the history of the singer's life and describes the situation of break in relations.

It Hurts received both positive and mixed reviews from critics. A magazine Afisha included it in the list of the most striking and memorable Russian pop hits of the last 20 years. The final review of 2011 music analyst of the newspaper Kommersant Boris Barabanov Nyusha called the song as a contender for the title song of the year.

The single was a commercial success, hitting the top 3 most rotating songs in Russia and Ukraine, according to the portal Tophit. Company 2M and Lenta.ru reported that It Hurts topped the charts best-selling digital tracks and took him to 11th place in 2011 in Russia, received platinum certification and broke up a circulation of 200 thousand copies.
