= 7 (Part 1) =

2019 EP by Artik & Asti

7 (Part 1) (Russian: «7 (Часть 1)») is the debut mini-album (EP) of Ukrainian group Artik & Asti, released on 29 March 2019 by the label Self Made. According to ТНТ Music, the title, like how many songs are on the album, was meant to coincide with seven years of the beginning of their music activity.

== History ==
The concert presentation of the album occurred on 30 March 2019. The venue was decided as "Главклуб Green Concert". In December of that year album placed 6th out of the top-10 albums on VK, and 3rd place on Yandex Music.

On 14 February 2019, the first song of the album was released. The song, «Грустный дэнс» written and sung with Артём Качер was the only pre-released song of the album. On 29 March, the day the album was released, a music video for the song the released. The director of it was Visnu. On 30 August, a music video for the song «Под гипнозом» was released, with the director being Alan Badoev.

== List of songs ==
According to Apple Music:

No.	Title	Length
1.	"Забудешь"	3:30
2.	"Грустный дэнс" (featuring Артём Качер)	3:38
3.	"Под гипнозом"	3:29
4.	"По проспектам"	3:34
5.	"Привет"	3:24
6.	"Роза"	3:26
7.	"Мне не нужны"	3:51
Total length:		24:52

== Charts ==
Chart (2019)	Highest Position
Russia (Apple Music)	2
