= Misha Marvin =

Ukrainian singer (born 1989)

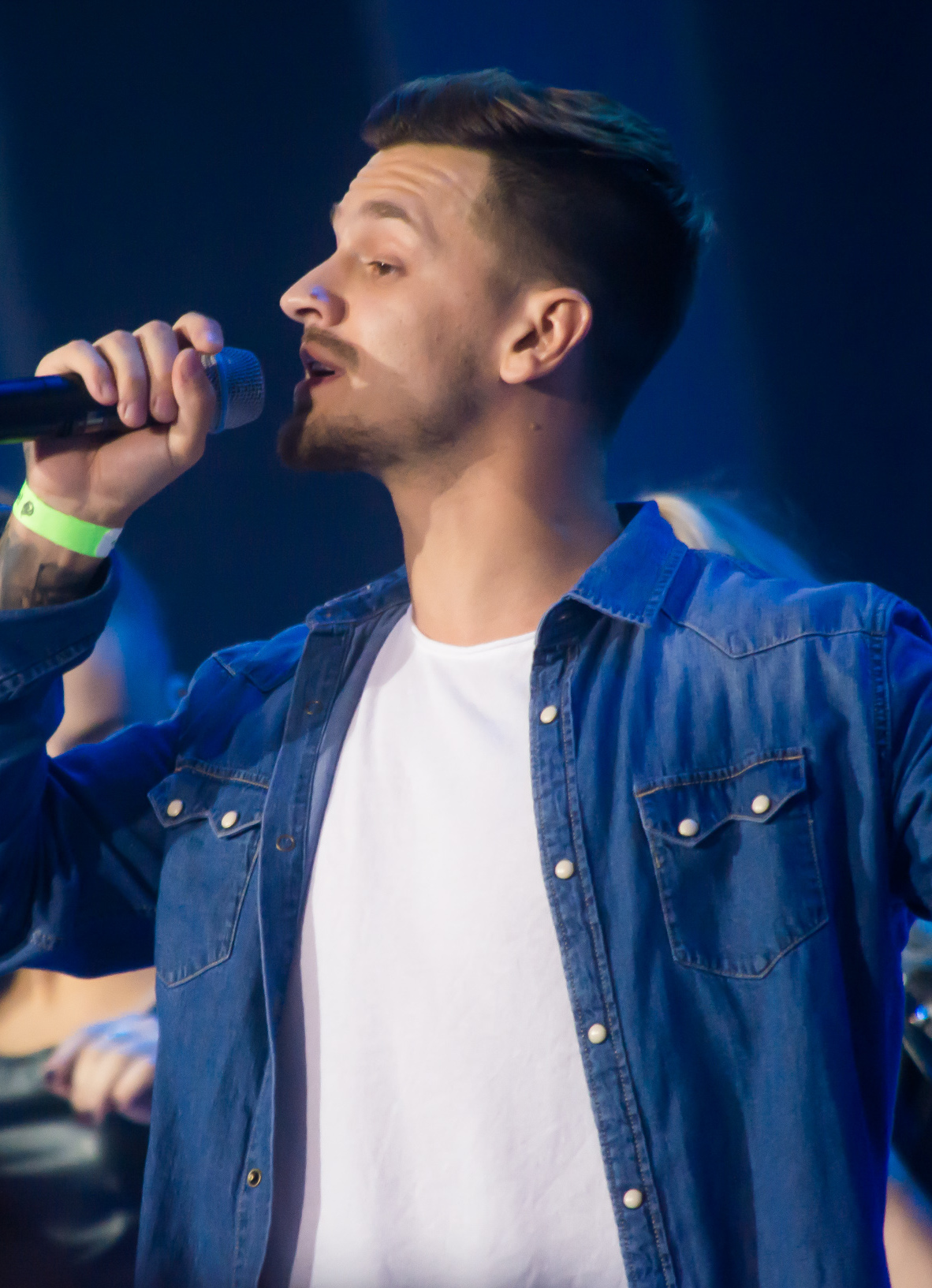
- Marvin performing in 2016

Background information
- Born: Mikhail Mikhailovich Reshetnyak; July 15, 1989 (age 37); Chernivtsi, Ukrainian SSR, Soviet Union
- Genres: Pop; dance
- Occupations: Singer; songwriter; actor; musician
- Years active: 2009–present

Mikhail Mikhailovich Reshetnyak (Note: Russian: Михаил Михайлович Решетняк; Ukrainian: Михайло Михайлович Решетняк; Mykhailo Mykhailovych Reshetniak) (born 15 July 1989), known professionally as Misha Marvin, is a Ukrainian singer and songwriter.

== Biography ==
=== Early years ===
Mikhail was born on 15 July 1989 in Chernivtsi (Ukraine). Both of his parents are massage therapists. His older sister is singer Tayanna. He also has two younger brothers, Bogdan and Taras.

=== Career ===
In 2013 Mikhail met the director of Black Star Inc. Pavel Kuryanov (Pasha), who offered to collaborate with him in songwriting. The musician quickly began working with the team of Egor Kreed. The result of their work was the release of the album «Холостяк». He also worked with other artists of the label and other singers overall. Together with Misha Marvin were the tracks «Кислород» (Mot feat. Nu Virgos), «Наверно» (Elena Temnikova feat. Natan), «Мама, я влюбилась» (Ханна) & others.

In March 2019 he worked on the soundtrack for the film «Счастье — это...» with Наzима, and in November with Oleg Ternovym (TERNOVOY) for the series «Дылды». That year, he released a song in Ukrainian with HammAli & Navai named «Я закохався». He also starred in Наzима's clip «Я твоя», after they wrote the acoustic version of the song.

In January 2020 Mikhail released a song with Ani Lorak called "Ухожу". In May he released a track with Ханна, which was featured on iTunes Russia Top-100. Then, in August, he released the single «Спой», created together with Mot.

In May 2022 after Russia invaded Ukraine, he announced his work with Russian music label Black Star Inc. was finished, saying: "I'm no longer an artist with the Black Star label. I'm no longer Misha Marvin".

== Discography ==
=== Studio albums ===
| Title | Information |
|---|---|
| Танцуй | Release: 3 September [2018; Label: Black Star Inc.; Format: Digital distribution |
| Чувствуй | Release: 6 November 2018]; Label: Black Star Inc.; Format: digital distribution |

=== Concert albums ===
| Title | Information |
|---|---|
| Чувствуй. Танцуй | Release: 4 June 2021; Label: Black Star Inc.; Format: Digital distribution |

=== Singles ===
| Title | Date released |
|---|---|
| Ну что за дела? (featuring DJ KAN & Timati) | 22 December 2015 |
| Стерва (featuring DJ KAN) | 28 April 2016 |
| Ненавижу | 11 July 2016 |
| Я так и знал | 14 March 2017 |
| Перемотай (featuring Эмма М) | 25 April 2017 |
| Выделяйся | 26 May 2017 |
| По венам яд (featuring DJ Daveed) | 23 June 2017 |
| Глубоко | 27 June 2017 |
| История | 14 September 2017 |
| По венам яд (featuring DJ Daveed) (Acoustic Version) | 10 October 2017 |
| Молчишь (featuring Bumble Beezy) | 19 December 2017 |
| С ней | 12 February 2018 |
| Ближе (featuring Masha Koltsova) | 20 March 2018 |
| Нравится мне | 2 April 2018 |
| Признание (OST «Леонардо: Миссия Мона Лиза») | 9 April 2018 |
| 4 утра (featuring Timati) | 17 April 2018 |
| История (featuring SOLOMONA & PLC) | 30 April 2018 |
| Странные | 19 June 2018 |
| Мы есть (featuring TERNOVOY & Natan) | 11 February 2019 |
| Танцуй (Acoustic Version) | 27 February 2019 |
| Под окнами | 3 March 2019 |
| Моя мечта (featuring Наzима) (OST «Счастье — это... Часть 2») | 26 March 2019 |
| Ты небо | 8 April 2019 |
| Остаться | 27 May 2019 |
| Ты одна | 15 July 2019 |
| Ты одна (Acoustic Version) | 23 September 2019 |
| Дура | 8 October 2019 |
| Атомы (featuring TERNOVOY) | 6 November 2019 |
| Я закохався (featuring HammAli & Navai) | 8 November 2019 |
| Я твоя (featuring Наzима) (Acoustic Version) | 14 November 2019 |
| Дура (DJ Noiz Remix) | 21 November 2019 |
| Ухожу (featuring Ani Lorak) | 21 January 2020 |
| Не надо быть сильной | 20 February 2020 |
| Ангел или Бес | 17 April 2020 |
| Ай-яй-яй | 12 May 2020 |
| Французский поцелуй (featuring Hanna) | 29 May 2020 |
| О мама | 22 July 2020 |
| Спой (featuring Мот) | 26 August 2020 |
| Усни | 30 September 2020 |
| Неправильная | 5 November 2020 |
| Фамилия | 17 January 2021 |
| Пьяный в такси (featuring Pasha Leem) | 11 February 2021 |
| Набери | 16 March 2021 |
| Обменяю всё на тебя | 22 April 2021 |
| Девочка, не бойся | 17 June 2021 |
| Красиво | 15 July 2021 |
| Любовь? (featuring Кирилл Мойтон) | 4 August 2021 |
| Убью тебя (featuring Ханна) | 16 September 2021 |
| Полюбил такую | 18 November 2021 |
| Не в этой жизни (featuring Natan) | 14 December 2021 |
| Человек | 4 May 2022 |
| Останови планету | 18 June 2022 |
| Спи | 15 July 2022 |
| Спи (Acoustic Version) | 18 July 2022 |
| Porn | 16 September 2022 |
| Спасибо (featuring Наzима) | 12 October 2022 |
| Спасибо (Acoustic Version) | 17 November 2022 |
| Если (featuring Artyom Kacher) | 25 November 2022 |
| Ретроград | 27 January 2023 |
| Держи | 3 March 2023 |
| Финал (featuring Ханна) | 30 March 2023 |

=== Guest on other singers' releases ===
| Name & album | Release date |
|---|---|
| Девочка S-класса — «В пути» (featuring Mc Doni) | 3 August 2016 |
| В пути — «В пути» (featuring Mc Doni) | 15 September 2016 |
| А может? — «92 дня» (featuring Мот) | 20 October 2016 |
| По венам яд — «дневник памяти» (featuring DJ Daveed) | 25 January 2018 |
| Ангел или Бес — «Палагин и партнеры» (featuring Palagin) | 17 April 2020 |

== Charts ==
| Year | Work | Chart | | | | Album |
| Year | Work | iTunes Top-100 Russia | Top Radio & YouTube Hits Russia | Top Radio Hits Russia | Top YouTube Hits Russia | Album |
|---|---|---|---|---|---|---|
| 2016 | Ну что за дела? | 1 | 56 | 173 | 9 | Single |
| 2016 | Стерва | 13 | 116 | — | 23 | Single |
| 2016 | Ненавижу | 3 | 170 | 142 | — | Single |
| 2016 | Девочка S-класса | 19 | 116 | 173 | 17 | В пути |
| 2017 | Перемотай | 58 | 35 | 28 | 97 | Single |
| 2017 | История | 2 | — | — | 50 | Single |
| 2018 | С ней | 3 | — | — | 46 | Single |
| 2020 | Ухожу | 3 | 284 | — | 57 | Single |
| 2020 | Французский поцелуй | 1 | 11 | 11 | 11 | Single |
