= Lesha Svik =

Russian singer (born 1990)

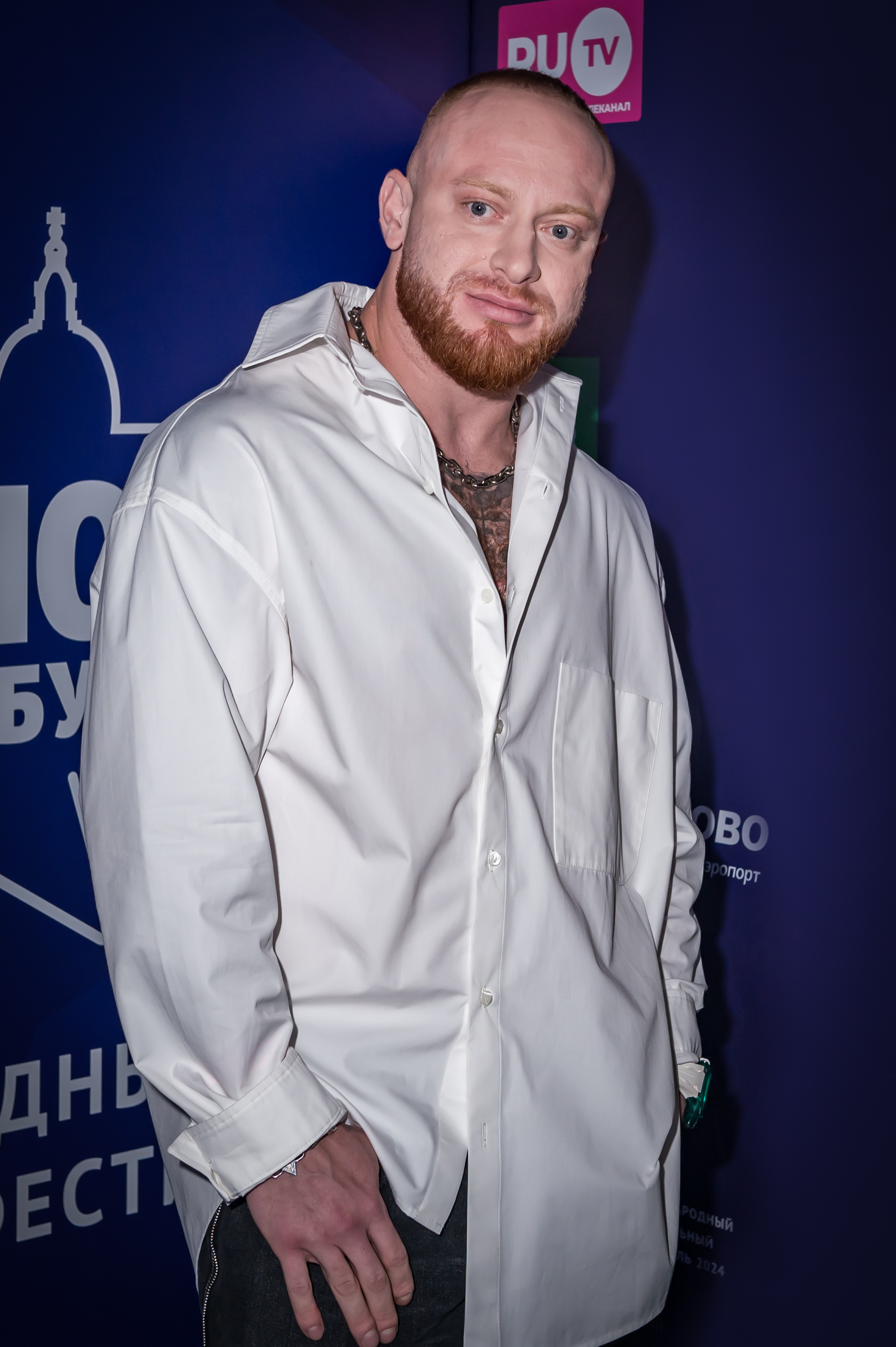

Background information
- Born: Aleksei Igorevich Norkitovich; November 21, 1990 (age 35); Sverdlovsk, USSR
- Genres: Hip hop; Pop; Deep house
- Occupations: singer; musician
- Label: Warner Music Russia

Lesha Svik (Russian: Лёша Свик) (real name: Aleksei Igorevich Norkitovich; Russian: Алексей Игоревич Норкитович, born 21 November 1990) is a Russian singer.

Svik became famous in 2017 with the song "Я хочу танцевать". Based on the results of 2018, two songs of Lesha Svik, "Дым" & "Малиновый свет", produced by beatmaker Nikolai Dubrovin (WZ Beats) entered into the top-30 most popular songs of the year on the social network VK (placing 16th & 17th respectively).

== Biography ==
Lesha Svik was born on 21 November 1990 in Sverdlovsk (now Yekaterinburg).

Svik was part of the music group Puzzle together with Fahmi & Appledream.

== Discography ==
«Юность»
Review scores
Source	Rating
InterMedia	4/5 stars

«Алиби»
Review scores
Source	Rating
InterMedia	7/10 stars

=== Studio albums ===
Title	Information	Notes
Юность	Release: 27 April 2018; Label: Warner Music Russia; Format: Digital distribution	* Tracklist: No. / Title / Length; 1. / "Юность" (feat. DJ Димиксер) / 3:35; 2. / "Молоды" / 3:04; 3. / "Дым" / 3:39; 4. / "Со мной улетай" / 2:36; 5. / "Ранены" / 4:26; 6. / "Двигайся" / 3:17; 7. / "Вселенная" (feat. DJ Mikis) / 2:53; 8. / "Потанцуй со мной" / 3:24; 9. / "Много ли надо" / 3:08; Total length: / / 28:42
Алиби	Release: 27 June 2019; Label: Warner Music Russia; Format: Digital distribution	* Tracklist: No. / Title / Length; 1. / "Остаюсь" / 1:47; 2. / "Танцуй пока молодой" / 2:24; 3. / "Луна" / 4:35; 4. / "Манекен" / 3:07; 5. / "Девчонка" / 3:13; 6. / "Рядом нет тебя" / 2:59; 7. / "Друг" / 4:51; 8. / "Не забывай меня" / 3:21; 9. / "Луна" (Arseny Troshin Remix) / 3:40; Total length: / / Общее: 27:97
Инсомния	Release: 4 February 2021; Label: Warner Music Russia; Format: Digital distribution	* Tracklist: No. / Title / Length; 1. / "Голливуд" / 2:45; 2. / "Инсомния" / 3:03; 3. / "Ей нравится" / 2:54; 4. / "Если ты здесь" / 3:58; 5. / "Не зашьёшь" / 3:29; 6. / "Я буду помнить" / 2:32; 7. / "Ты так пьяна" / 2:39; 8. / "Ищу твои глаза" / 2:58; 9. / "Пацаны" / 3:37; Total length: / / 25:55

=== Mini albums ===
Title
Information
Notes
Торнадо — EP
- Release: 22 May 2020
- Label: Warner Music Russia
- Format: Digital distribution

* Tracklist
No.	Title	Length
1.	"Кеды"	3:15
2.	"Торнадо"	3:06
3.	"Беззаботные дни"	3:38
Total length:		9:59

Я-Начало
- Release: May 24 2024
- Label: Warner Music Russia
- Format: Digital distribution
* Tracklist

No. Title Length

1. "Бывшим" 3:15
2. "Таро" 3:49
3. "Районы-кварталы" 3:30
4. "Если ты со мной" 2:50
5. "Эмилия" 4:28

Total Length: 17:55

=== Duet albums ===
Title	Information	Notes
Послевчера (Vnuk & Lesha Svik)	Release: 18 June 2014; Label: AFERA MUSIC; Format: Digital Distribution	* Тracklist: No. / Title / Length; 1. / "Послевчера" / 3:15; 2. / "По кругу" / 3:32; 3. / "Закрой глаза" / 3:16; 4. / "Градусы" / 3:34; 5. / "Последнее солнце" (feat. Дима Un1cal) / 3:07; 6. / "Белые кроссовки" (feat. KSA & Дима Un1cal) / 6:26; 7. / "Эффекты" / 3:42; 8. / "Так реально" (feat. Dramma & Дима Un1cal) / 4:58; Total length: / / 30:30
Утопия (Xamm & Lesha Svik)	Release: 1 March 2015; Label: Soyuz Music; Format: Digital Distribution	* Tracklist: No. / Title / Length; 1. / "Она так любит" / 2:52; 2. / "Мне не нужно слов" / 3:38; 3. / "Хочешь?" / 2:56; 4. / "Настя" / 2:57; 5. / "Настя, Часть 2" / 3:38; 6. / "Настя, Часть 3" / 3:13; 7. / "Ухожу от тебя" (feat. Ahimas) / 3:47; Total length: / / Общее: 21:03
Ноль градусов (Vnuk & Lesha Svik)	Release: 7 March 2017; Label: AFERA MUSIC; Format: Digital Distribution	* Tracklist: No. / Title / Length; 1. / "Ангелы" / 3:15; 2. / "День или ночь" / 3:12; 3. / "День рождения" / 3:47; 4. / "Красными губами" / 3:31; 5. / "Нас больше солнце не греет" / 3:39; 6. / "Перелётными птицами" / 3:31; 7. / "Сорт кокаина" / 3:56; Total length: / / 23:31

== Music videos ==
External videos
- YouTube
- «Я хочу танцевать»
- «#Неодета»
- «Малиновый свет»
- «Шантарам» (с Анной Седоковой)
- «Поцелуй на балконе» (с Ольгой Бузовой) (Mood Video)
- «Самолеты»
- «Стерва»
- «Луна»
- «Беззаботные дни» (Mood Video)
- «Торнадо» (Mood Video)
- «Paco Rabanne»
- «Ей нравится»
- «Стреляй»
- «Плакала»

== Annual charts ==
Song	Chart (2018)	Pos.	Ref.
Lesha Svik — «Дым»	Apple Music Top-100 in Russia: 2018	48	
Lesha Svik — «Дым»	TopHit YouTube – Top Year-End Hits	156	
Lesha Svik — «Малиновый свет»	Apple Music Top-100 in Russia: 2018	29	
Lesha Svik — «Малиновый свет»	TopHit Radio & YouTube – Top Year-End Hits 2018	99	
Lesha Svik — «Малиновый свет»	TopHit YouTube – Top Year-End Hits	51	

== Awards and nominations ==
Year	Award	Nomination	Category	Result	Ref.
2018	Russian National Music Award 2018	Lesha Svik — «Малиновый свет»	Dance hit of the year	Nominated	
2019	Премия RU.TV	Lesha Svik	Strong start	Nominated	
