= Podonok (song) =

Single by Danya Milokhin
- Language: Russian
- Released: June 24, 2020
- Genre: Pop
- Length: 2:01
- Label: WJ Music

"Podonok" (Russian: «Подонок») is a song by Russian TikTok-blogger and rapper Danya Milokhin, released as a single on June 24, 2020, through the label WJ Music.

== Music video ==
An audio video was released along with the song, which, collected about 500,000 views in 13 hours.
