= Yulia Gavrilina =

Russian vlogger & singer (born 2002)

Gavrilina
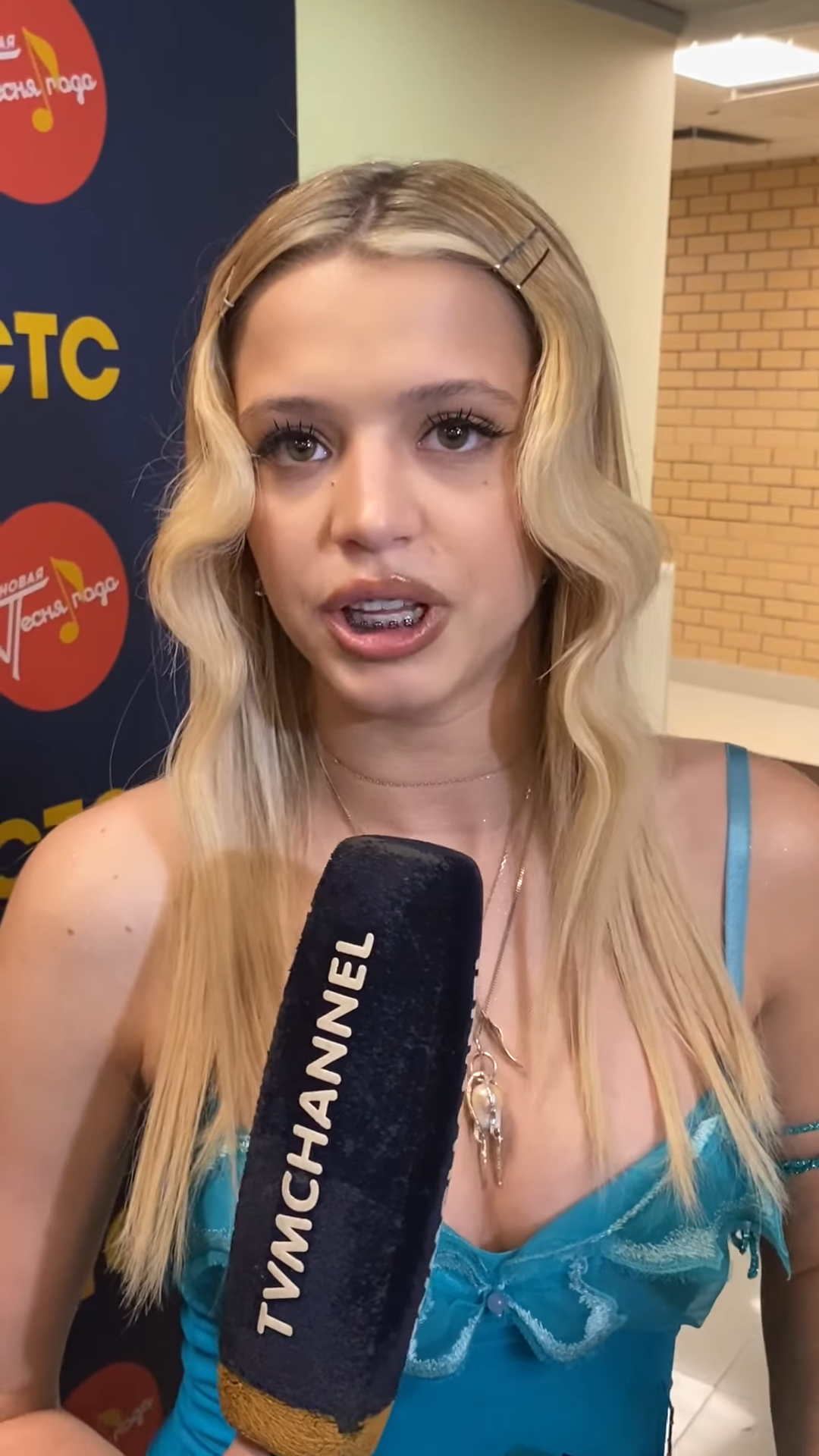
- Gavrilina in January 2024

Background information
- Born: Yulia Mikhailovna Gavrilina; June 26, 2002 (age 24); Tyumen, Russia
- Genres: Pop
- Occupations: Vlogger; singer; television actress
- Years active: 2017–present
- Label: Koala Music

Yulia Mikhailovna Gavrilina (Russian: Ю́лия Миха́йловна Гаври́лина; born 26 June 2002), better known as Yulka Shpulka (Russian: Ю́лька Шпу́лька, lit. 'Yulka the Bobbin'), or simply Gavrilina (stylized in Latin all caps, GAVRILINA), is a Russian vlogger (TikToker), singer, and actress.

== Biography ==
Gavrilina was born on 26 June 2002. She lost her father at an early age.

At 14, Gavrilina opened an account on Musical.ly and then TikTok.

In 2020, Russian edition of Forbes placed her #4 among the highest-paid Russian TikTokers.

At the end of March 2021, a book called "Ближе к звёздам! Не стесняйся, будь собой", written by Gavrilina, became available for pre-order. In September, Gavrilina participated on the show "Stars in Africa" (Russian: Звёзды в Африке) on the television channel ТNТ; she subsequently became a finalist.

In 2023, on the online streaming service Okko, a series called "Open Marriage" (Russian: Открытый брак) was released, where Yulia held a role.

== Discography ==
=== Singles ===
Year	Date	Title	Charts		Label
Year	Date	Title	CIS		Label
Year	Date	Title	TopHit Top Radio & YouTube Hits	TopHit Top YouTube Hits	Label
2020	24 Jul.	"Жу Жу"	119	23	Legacy Music
2020	20 Oct.	"Только ты"	—	—	Legacy Music
2020	25 Dec.	"Замело"	371	61	Legacy Music
2021	17 Feb.	"Ближе к звёздам"	—	—	Liveliness
2021	29 Apr.	"Омут"	167	32	Liveliness
2021	28 Sept.	"Всё равно"	—	—	Sony Music Russia
2022	9 Aug.	"Хватит"	—	—	Zion Music
2022	21 Dec.	"Забей и просто танцуй"	—	—	Kiss Koala
2023	1 May.	"Брекеты"	—	—	VK Records
2023	20 Oct.	"Tiffany"	—	—	VK Records

== Awards and nominations ==
Year	Award	Nomination	Result	Ref.
2020	Results of 2020 per the television show «ТНТ Music»	Best TikToker of the year	Nominated	
2021	"Девичник Teens Awards 2021"	Instagrammer of the year	Won	
2021	Results of 2021 per the television show «ТНТ Music»	Best TikToker of the year	Won	
