= Swagg (album) =

Studio album by Timati
- Released: June 8, 2012
- Recorded: 2008–2012
- Genre: Dance, Hip Hop, R&B
- Length: 79:55 (Russian Edition); 116:37 (European 2CD Edition)
- Label: Black Star Inc. Kontor Records; Global Productions

Timati chronology
The Boss (2006)	Swagg (2012)	XIII (2013)

Singles from SWAGG
- 1. "Groove On" Released: September 2009 December 2010 (Global Productions) February 2013 (Kontor Records Re-Release); 2. "Love You" Released: October 2009; 3. "Party Animal" Released: April 2011; 4. "Welcome to St. Tropez" Released: April 2011; 5. "Money In Da Bank" Released: April 2011; 6. "I'm On You" Released: February 2012; 7. "Not All About the Money" Released: June 2012 July 2012 (Remixes); 8. "Forever" Released: August 2012; 9. "Match Me" Released: September 2012; 10. "Sex in the Bathroom" Released: October 2012

Swagg is the third studio album by Russian rapper Timati, released on June 8, 2012.

== Track listing ==
No.	Title	Length
1.	"My Life" (featuring Matisse and Sadko)	4:11
2.	"Not All About the Money" (with La La Land featuring Timbaland and Grooya)	4:13
3.	"Sex in the Bathroom" (featuring Craig David)	4:28
4.	"Party Animal" (featuring DJ M.E.G.)	3:14
5.	"Welcome to St. Tropez" (vs. DJ Antoine featuring Kalenna)	3:15
6.	"Amanama" (featuring DJ Antoine vs. Mad Mark)	4:17
7.	"Got Damn" (featuring Laurent Wolf and Michael Yousher)	3:44
8.	"Baby Be My Girl"	3:19
9.	"Love to Love" (featuring Victoria Kimani)	3:35
10.	"Last Call" (featuring Music Hayk)	3:02
11.	"I'm On You" (featuring P. Diddy and DJ Antoine vs. Mad Mark)	3:27
12.	"Tonight"	3:54
13.	"Lonely" (featuring La La Land)	4:58
14.	"Forever" (featuring Mario Winans)	4:04
15.	"Top of the World"	4:15
16.	"Money in Da Bank" (featuring Eve)	3:38
17.	"Get Money" (featuring Mims and Mann)	4:12
18.	"Boomerang"	3:34
19.	"Match Me" (featuring J-Son and DJ Antoine vs. Mad Mark)	3:58
20.	"Groove On" (featuring Snoop Dogg and Big Ali)	3:52
21.	"Love You" (featuring Busta Rhymes and Mariya)	4:13
Total length:		79:55

== European 2CD-Set Edition ==
CD1
No.	Title	Length
1.	"Not All About The Money (DJ Antoine vs Mad Mark 2K12 Radio Edit)" (Timati & La La Land featuring Timbaland and Grooya)	3:12
2.	"Forever (FlameMakers Radio Edit)" (Timati featuring Mario Winans)	3:18
3.	"Groove On (Remady Radio Edit)" (Timati featuring Snoop Dogg)	3:21
4.	"Amanama [Money] (DJ Antoine vs Mad Mark Deluxe Edit)" (DJ Antoine vs Timati)	4:17
5.	"My Life" (Timati featuring Matisse and Sadko)	4:09
6.	"Top Of The World"" (Timati)	4:13
7.	"I'm On You (DJ Antoine vs Mad Mark Radio Edit)" (Timati & P. Diddy, DJ Antoine, Dirty Money)	3:17
8.	"Love You (B-Case vs Nicolas Rapture Radio Edit)" (Timati featuring Busta Rhymes and Mariya)	3:56
9.	"Match Me (DJ Antoine vs Mad Mark Re-Construction)" (Timati featuring J-Son)	3:58
10.	"Got Damn" (Timati featuring Laurent Wolf and Michael Yousher)	3:43
11.	"Get Money (Jerome Radio Edit)" (Timati featuring Mims and Mann)	3:51
12.	"Money In Da Bank (Bodybangers Radio Edit)" (Timati featuring Eve)	3:52
13.	"Baby Be My Girl (produced by Mark Holiday)" (Timati)	3:18
14.	"Love To Love (Rene Rodrigezz Radio Edit)" (Timati featuring Victoria Kimani)	2:54
Total length:		51:06

CD2
No.	Title	Length
1.	"Welcome To St. Tropez (DJ Antoine vs Mad Mark Radio Edit)" (DJ Antoine vs Timati featuring Kalenna)	3:15
2.	"Party Animal Mike Candys Radio Edit)" (DJ M.E.G. featuring Timati)	3:14
3.	"Sex In The Bathroom (PH Electro Radio Edit)" (Timati featuring Craig David)	3:35
4.	"Last Call" (Timati featuring Music Hayk)	3:02
5.	"Lonely" (Timati featuring La La Land)	4:57
6.	"Tonight (FlameMakers Radio Edit)" (Timati)	3:13
7.	"Boomerang" (Timati)	3:32
8.	"Welcome To Saint Tropez (Russian Version)" (Timati featuring Blue Marine)	3:52
9.	"Love To Love" (Timati featuring Victoria Kimani)	3:35
10.	"Groove On (DJ Antoine vs Mad Mark Radio Edit)" (Timati featuring Snoop Dogg and Big Ali)	3:15
11.	"Party Animal (Radio Mix)" (DJ M.E.G. featuring Timati)	3:14
12.	"Forever" (Timati featuring Mario Winans)	4:02
13.	"Love You" (Timati featuring Busta Rhymes and Mariya)	4:11
14.	"Money In Da Bank" (Timati featuring Eve)	3:39
15.	"Get Money" (Timati featuring Mims and Mann)	4:12
16.	"Sex In The Bathroom" (Timati featuring Craig David)	3:27
17.	"Not All About The Money (Radio Edit)" (Timati & La La Land featuring Timbaland and Grooya)	3:10
18.	"Not All About The Money (PH Electro Radio Edit)" (Timati & La La Land featuring Timbaland and Grooya)	3:55
Total length:		65:30

== Charts ==
Chart (2012)	Peak position
Austrian Albums Chart	60
German Albums Chart	31
Swiss Albums Chart	17
Russian Albums Chart	9
