= Vlad Topalov =

Russian singer (born 1985)

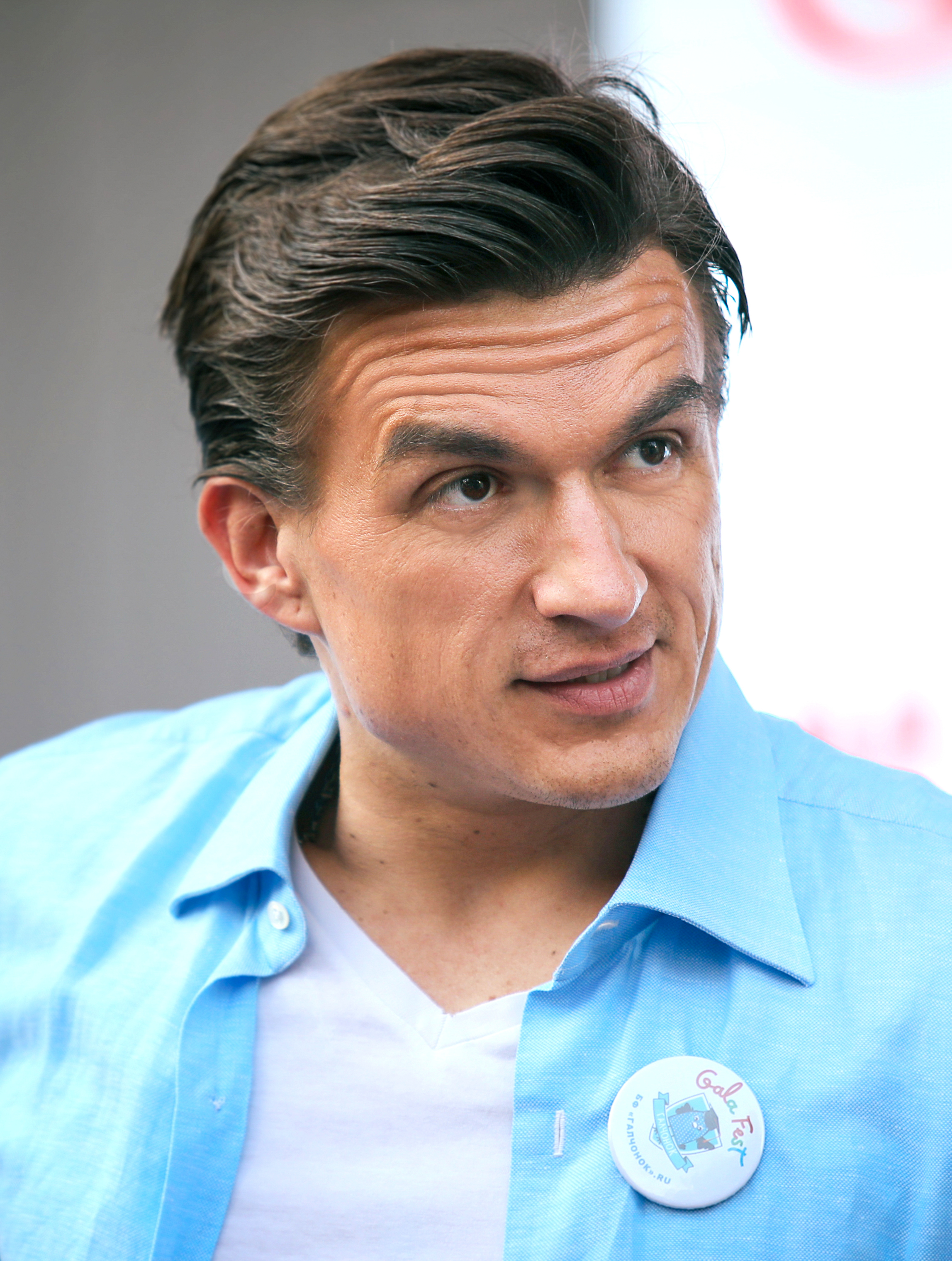
- Vlad Topalov, 2018

Background information
- Born: Vladislav Mikhailovich Topalov; 25 October 1985 (age 41)
- Origin: Moscow, Russian SFSR, USSR
- Genres: Pop, pop rock, hip hop
- Occupation: Musician
- Instrument: vocals
- Years active: 1993–present
- Label: Style Records

Vladislav Mikhailovich Topalov (Russian: Владислав Михайлович Топалов; born 25 October 1985) better known as just Vlad Topalov (Влад Топалов) is a singer born in Moscow, Russia. He is most famous for his singing career, when he rose to fame as the blond-haired member of the group Smash!!. The group broke up in 2006. Since then Topalov has pursued a solo career. He appeared in the seventh season of ice show contest Ice Age.

== SMASH!! ==
In 2000 Sergey Lazarev and Vlad Topalov started the boy band Smash!!. Shortly after they were signed by Universal Music Records in Russia and were one of the biggest Russian pop groups in 2002–2003. The duo had five No. 1 hits, numerous awards and sold millions of records in Russia, CIS and East Asia (including Hong Kong, Taiwan, Thailand) during their brief career as a group.

At the beginning of 2002 the duo shot their first video clip for the song "Should Have Loved You More". That August Smash!! won the 'New Wave' contest in Jūrmala and in October 2002 Smash!! released their first single "Belle". The video for "Belle" topped MTV Russia's chart for 6 months and entered the list of top 20 clips of the past five years. The story behind this song tells about the formation of the duo Smash!!, apparently Vlad and Sergey rehearsed the song as a birthday present to Vlad's father, but after he heard the song he immediately told all his friends and ended up on the radio as one of his friends started playing at a local station.

In February 2003 the band finally released their debut album, Freeway. Over a million discs were sold in Russia and other nations in the Commonwealth of Independent States. Smash!! subsequently toured Russia throughout 2003.

The following year Freeway was released in East Asian countries including; Korea, China, Taiwan, Thailand, Hong Kong, Malaysia, Singapore, Indonesia, India, and the Philippines. The release of the album was followed by the promotional tour in the South-Eastern Asia, during which the band shot a video clip for the cover-version of George Michael's song "Faith" in Shanghai.

In May 2004 Smash!! in cooperation with the Italian band Earphones recorded the song "Obsession". When the song entered the radio rotation, it immediately gained the top of hit parades and became the top summer hit 2004. That year Smash!! received the award of the MTV Russian Music Awards (RMA in short) 2004 as the pop-project of the year, and the award of the sound-track as the band of the year.

On 1 December 2004 Smash!! released the second album, 2Nite. The band split up only one week after the release,

== Evolution and the breakup of the band (2006) ==
Vlad Topalov released one more album, Evolution, under the band's name, with seven musicians, due to the band's contract obligations with Universal Music. After that, Vlad followed Sergey's footsteps and also went solo, which led to the formal discontinuation of the band.

Smash!! reunited for a short performance in RMA 2006, where Sergey and Vlad sang Belle.

In 2008 Topalov claimed that he was a regular user of cocaine and ecstasy pills and his drug use was a reason in the breakup of the band.

== Studio albums ==
=== "Smash!!" albums ===
- 2003 – Freeway
- 2004 – 2Nite

=== Solo albums ===
- 2005 – Evolution (This album was marked like Smash album but only Topalov took part in recording)
- 2006 – Odinokaya Zvezda/Одинокая звезда (Lonely Star)
- 2008 – Pust' Serdtse Reshaet/Пусть сердце решает (Let heart decide)
- 2008 – I Will Give It All To You
