= TV show (disambiguation) =

TV show may refer to:

- television program, a broadcast segment on television
- TV Show (album), a 2007 music recording by Russian singer Sergey Lazarev WWE

== See also ==
- Lists of television programs
