= Don't Be Fake =

Studio album by Sergey Lazarev
- Released: 1 December 2005
- Recorded: 2005
- Genre: Pop rock
- Length: 49:11
- Label: Style Records
- Producer: Brian Rawling

Sergey Lazarev chronology
Don't Be Fake (2005)	TV show (2007)

Don't Be Fake is the debut solo album by Russian pop star Sergey Lazarev. Formerly in boyband duo Smash!!, Sergey and Vlad Topalov dominated Eastern Europe with their albums which reached platinum success.

Although the album has only been released in Eastern Europe it is primarily English songs with an "East meets West"-style ballads and pop songs. The album was recorded in London, England in 2005, but there are currently no plans to release it in the West.

== Singles ==
- Eye Of The Storm [With a music video shot in South Africa]
- Lost Without Your Love Music video shot in Miami, Florida, USA]
- Just Because You Walk Away
- Fake Music video shot in London, UK]

== Track listing ==
No.	Title	Writer(s)	Producer	Length
1.	"Fake"	Ben Adams, Cliff Masterson	Cliff Masterson	2:36
2.	"Can't Let You Go" (Earphones Mix)	Ben Robbins, Luca Lento, Roberto Terranova	Earphones	2:43
3.	"Lost Without Your Love"	Graham Stack, Peter Cunnah	Ben "Jammin" Robbins	3:37
4.	"Beautiful"	Ashley Alexander, Chesney Hawkes, Joanne Youle	Ashley Alexander, Ben "Jammin" Robbins	3:55
5.	"Eye of the Storm"	Tonino Speciale	Ben "Jammin" Robbins	3:53
6.	"Do It for Me"	Kalimber, Lamont Dozier, Paul Barry		3:19
7.	"Nobody Told Me"	Pete Martin, Steve Lee		3:30
8.	"Just Because You Walk Away"	Gordon Pogoda, John Stephan	Ben "Jammin" Robbins*	4:01
9.	"Someone Like You"	Jeff Taylor, Mark Taylor, Steve Torch	Groove Brothers	3:42
10.	"That's Where I'll Belong"	Katherine Ellis, Paul Meehan, Tim Woodcock		3:19
11.	"I'm Gone"	Ben Adams, Mark Read	Brian Rawling	4:19
12.	"Earth Song"	Michael Jackson	Ben "Jammin" Robbins	5:45
13.	"Do It for Me" (Groove Brothers Remix)		Groove Brothers	3:28
14.	"That's Where I'll Belong" (Slow Version)	Katherine Ellis, Paul Meehan, Tim Woodcock		3:33
15.	"Eye of the Storm" (HarDrum Remix)		Alexei HarDrum	4:34
