= Konfuz =

Armenian-born Russian singer (born 2003)

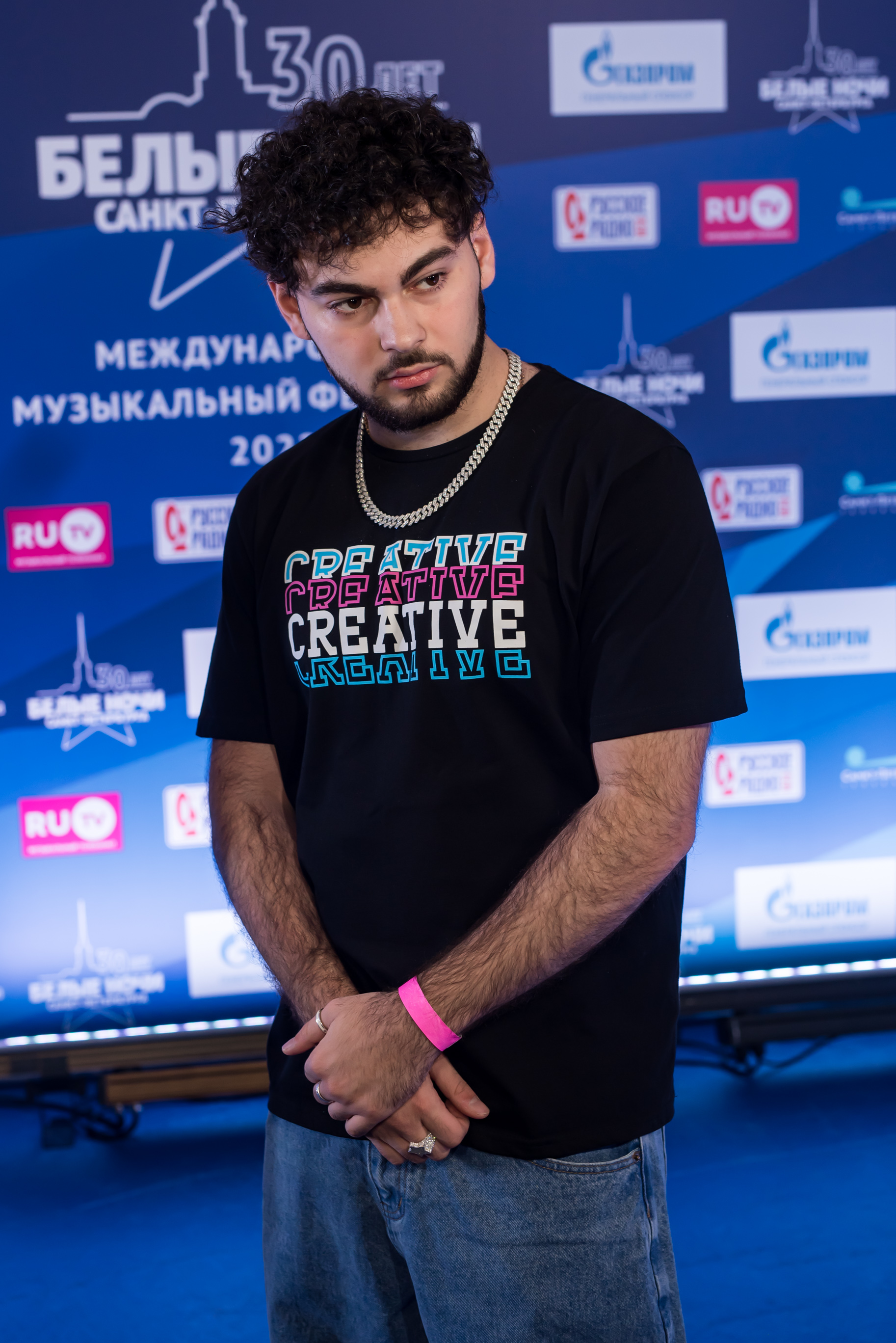
- Konfuz in 2022
- Born: Mikhail Armanovich Margaryan; 29 June 2003 (age 23); Vanadzor, Armenia
- Occupations: pop and rap singer, songwriter
- Years active: 2020–present
- Known for: music

Mikhail Armanovich Margaryan (Russian: Михаил Арманович Маргарян; Armenian: Միքայել Արմանի Մարգարյան; born 29 June 2003), better known by his stage name Konfuz, is a Russian and Armenian pop and rap artist and songwriter.

== Biography ==
Mikhail Margaryan was born on 29 June 2003 in Vanadzor, Lori Province, Armenia. At the age of 1, he moved to Moscow with his family.

From the age of 6 to 15, he played football professionally. At 15, he moved to Spain, where he lived for six months and played for the FC Barcelona youth team. At 14, he received his first Leather Ball, but at 15, he suffered a meniscus injury in his left knee and was forced to end his career without ever making his professional debut.

As a child he learned to play musical instruments. It was then that he wrote his first song.

Since 2020, he has been studying at the Financial University under the Government of the Russian Federation.

In January 2020, at the age of 16, he released his first track, "Aw, how cute!" (Ути путишка), which went double platinum and garnered over 40 million plays. It reached number 25 on the charts of major streaming platforms. Later, he released the songs "Sweet Little One" (Милая малая), "Lambo" (Ламбо), and "You Wounded Me" (Ранила меня).

In March 2020, Konfuz released the track "You Got High" (Кайф ты поймала). It has garnered over 200 million streams, 10 platinum awards, and over 92 million views on YouTube. The song has inspired over 1.1 million TikTok videos. In 2021, the song received the "Soundtrack of Self-Isolation" button award on VKontakte. The track became the most-streamed song in the Russian internet during quarantine from the COVID-19 pandemic.

In October 2020, the track "Lambo" was released, which collected 17 million plays and went platinum. In December 2020, the track "You Wounded Me" was released, garnering over 120 million plays and 9.4 million views on YouTube.

In 2021, the music video for the song "Ratata" (Ратата) was released. Its views on YouTube exceeded 82 million. More than 8 million videos of the song have been posted on TikTok. At the end of 2021, the song became the third most popular on TikTok, and also entered the top 30 tracks on VK Music.

In 2021, he released the single “Lost Interest” (Пропал интерес), which reached number 2 on the VK Music chart.

On 30 September 2022, the track “You Caught the Vibe” (Вайб ты поймала) was released, reaching 3rd place in the VK Music chart.

On 14 April 2023, he released his debut album, “Voice Recorder and Notes” (Диктофон и заметки), which included 8 songs.

On 1 September 2023, together with The Limba, he released the single “You and I” (Ты и Я).

On 28 February 2024, he released the mini-album "Love Airlines" featuring Alisha, Jacques Anthony and GeeGun.

In 2024, he also released the singles "Sponsor of Your Smile" (Спонсор твоей улыбки) and "Italy" (Италия), which reached high positions on streaming service charts. The music video for "Italy" has garnered over 10 million views on YouTube.

On 8 June 2024, he took part in the VK Fest, and on 8 December, in the New Song of the Year festival.

== Discography ==
=== Studio albums ===
Year	Name
2023	Диктофон и заметки

=== Mini-albums ===
Year	Name
2024	Love Airlines

=== Singles ===
==== As a leading performer ====
Year	Name	Album
2020	«Ути путишка»	Non-album singles
2020	«Милая малая»	Non-album singles
2020	«Кайф ты поймала»	Non-album singles
2020	«Няшка»	Non-album singles
2020	«LOVA LOVA» (in collaboration with RIPSI)	Non-album singles
2020	«Море волнуется раз»	Non-album singles
2020	«Ламбо»	Non-album singles
2020	«Ранила меня»	Non-album singles
2021	«Ратата»	Non-album singles
2021	«Война»	Non-album singles
2021	«Не поверю (OST „Проклятый чиновник“)»	Non-album singles
2021	«Касаюсь»	Non-album singles
2021	«Очень-очень»	Non-album singles
2021	«Капкан (Волшебная Ариэль)» (with Mia Boyka)	Non-album singles
2021	«Миллионы причин»	Non-album singles
2021	«Пропал интерес»	Non-album singles
2022	«Сказка»	Non-album singles
2022	«Кома»	Non-album singles
2022	«Автопилот»	Non-album singles
2022	«Извини»	Non-album singles
2022	«Вайб ты поймала»	Non-album singles
2022	«Скучаю»	Non-album singles
2023	«Выше»	Диктофон и заметки
2023	«Чувства»	Non-album singles
2023	«Yerevani sirun axjik»	Non-album singles
2023	«Ты и я»	Non-album singles
2023	«Ой ой»	Non-album singles
2023	«Отпускаю»	Non-album singles
2024	«Спонсор твоей улыбки»	Non-album singles
2024	«Она Искусство»	Non-album singles
2024	«Италия»	Non-album singles
2024	«Манера» (feat. Wallem)	Non-album singles
2024	«Грация»	Non-album singles
2024	«На миллион» (feat. Акулич)	Non-album singles
2025	«Холода»	Non-album singles
2025	«BINGO»	Non-album singles
2025	«Ракурс»	Non-album singles
2025	«Тост»	Non-album singles
2025	«Танцуй со мной»	Non-album singles
2025	«Как звучит любовь»	Non-album singles
2025	«Party»	Non-album singles
2025	«ZA»	Non-album singles
2025	«Miss»	Non-album singles
2025	«Сеньорита»	Non-album singles

==== As a guest artist ====
Year	Name	Album
«Не смотри» (Escape featuring Konfuz)	2021	Non-album singles
«Аккорды» (Rakhim featuring Konfuz)	2022	Non-album singles
«Вопросы» (Ханза in collaboration with Konfuz)	2022	Fashion Movements
«Yerevani sirun axjik» (Siris featuring Konfuz)	2023	Non-album singles
«Ты и Я» (The Limba featuring Konfuz)	2023	Non-album singles
«По всем клубам» (Molodoj Platon featuring Konfuz)	2023	Non-album singles
«Много раз» (Jabo featuring Konfuz)	2023	Why Always Me?
«Вали» (DJ Smash featuring Konfuz)	2024	Miu Miu

== Videos ==
Year	Name
2020	«Кайф ты поймала»
2021	«Ранила меня»
2021	«Ратата»
2021	«Война»
2021	«Не смотри»
2021	«Касаюсь»
2021	«Капкан (Волшебная Ариэль)»
2021	«Пропал интерес»
2022	«Вайб ты поймала»
2023	«Тише»
2023	«Выше»
2024	«Манера»
2024	«Италия»

== Television ==
- From January 27 to October 27, 2023, he hosted "Top Chart" on TNT Music (now called FON MUSIC).

== Awards ==
Year	Prize	Category	Result
2021	Премия Bloggers & Kids Music Awards	«Дуэт года» (with Mia Boyka)	Won
2022	Премия RU.TV	«Лучший кавер» («Не смотри» with Escape)	Won
2023	Премия RU.TV	«Лучший кавер» («Выше»)	Won
