= Koala Music =

Russian record label

- Founded: 1999; 27 years ago
- Genre: Popular music
- Country of origin: Russia
- Location: Moscow

Koala Music (until 8 September 2022, known as Sony Music Russia or Sony Music Entertainment Russia; and until 18 September 2023, known as Kiss Koala) is a Russian record label. Until in the fall of 2022, it was a division of Sony Music Entertainment.

== History ==
=== 1999—2022: Sony Music Russia ===
The company opened its division in the Russian Federation on 1 December 1999. In 2000, the company signed its first contract with Russian group Bi-2.

On 10 March 2022, after the Russia's invasion of Ukraine, Sony Music Entertainment announced they would be suspending operations and releases in Russia, though Russian employees of Sony Music Group would continue to receive salaries indefinitely.

On 17 January 2023, the newspaper Kommersant reported that former top managers of Warner Music Russia, who founded ООО "Мерит", a company associated with the Russian distributor S&P Digital, had purchased the label.

== Current artists ==
Artist	Real Name
Sergey Lazarev	Sergey Vyacheslavovich Lazarev
Alsou	Alsou Ralifovna Abramova
GeeGun	Denis Aleksandrovich Ustimenko
Ramil’	Ramil Aleksandrovich Alimov
VAVAN	Vladimir Yurievich Selivanov
CMH	Ruslan Sergeevich Tushentsov
OG Buda	Grigoriy Alekseevich Lyakhov
Big Russian Boss	Igor Alekseevich Seravin
Young P&H	Stanislav Dmitrievich Konchenkov
VESNA305	Yuriy Andreevich Nikolaenko
Olehan	Oleg Sergeevich Trempoltsev
Soska 69	Nancy Olegovna Sosa
ALISHA	Aaliya Adzharatu Lyudmila Ismailovna Kone
Кишлак	Maksim Sergeevich Fisenko
Минин	Mikhail Karenovich Kardashian
9mice	Sergei Dmitriev
Raikaho	Viktor Likarenko
nyan.mp3	Sergei Sergeevich Nalyotov
FRIENDLY THUG 52 NGG	Aleksandr Dmitrievich Romanov
Voskresenskii	Evgeny Sergeevich Ostrovskiy
WhyBaby?	(No Information)
dabbackwood	(No Information)
Ицык Цыпер	Igor Aleksandrovich Tsiba
