= Khavchik =

Single by Timati feat. GeeGun & Danya Milokhin

from the album Transit
- Language: Russian
- Released: June 10, 2020
- Genre: Hip Hop
- Length: 3:05
- Label: Black Star

Khavchik (Russian: Хавчик) is a single by Russian hip hop singers Timati, GeeGun & Danya Milokhin, released on 10 June 2020 through the label Black Star.

== History ==
While GeeGun was in a mental hospital, he did live broadcasts on Instagram. In one of them, he said he was going to eat a "delicious snack." This became the idea for the song.

On 11 June 2020, Timati, GeeGun & Danya Milokhin performed the song on the show Evening Urgant.

== Music video ==
The music video to the track was released on 10 June 2020 on Timati's official YouTube channel. The video's director was Zaur Zaseev.
