= The Boss (Timati album) =

Studio album by Timati
- Released: November 13, 2009
- Recorded: 2007–2009
- Genre: Hip hop, pop, R&B
- Length: 79:18
- Label: Black Star

Timati chronology
Black Star (2006)	The Boss (2009)	SWAGG (2012)

Singles from The Boss
- 1. "Forever" Released: September 2008; 2. "Welcome to St. Tropez" Released: January 2009; 3. "Groove On" Released: March 2009; 4. "Одноклассница" Released: July 2009

The Boss is the second studio album by Russian rapper Timati, released on November 13, 2009.

== Overview ==
It is the first Russian hip hop release to have multiple American guest features and collaborations. Both artists and producers including names such as Busta Rhymes, Xzibit, Mario Winans, Snoop Dogg, etc.

== Track listing ==
No.	Title	Producer(s)	Length
1.	"Nokturne "BOSS LIFE"" (feat. Music Hayk)	B.K., Timati	2:55
2.	"Время [Vremya]" (feat. B.K.)	B.K., Timati	4:19
3.	"Forever" (feat. Mario Winans)	Timati, Mario Winans	4:35
4.	"Одноклассница [Odnoklassnitsa]" (feat. GeeGun)	Michael Yousher, Timati	4:08
5.	"Не звони [Ne zvoni]"	Fun2mass	3:47
6.	"Сколько стоит любовь [Skolko Stoit Lubov]"	Michael Yousher, Timati	3:35
7.	"Прыгай в тачку [Prigay v tachku]" (feat. Tom'n'Jerry)	Mr. Bruce	3:57
8.	"Bossa"	Fun2mass	4:23
9.	"Cosmos" (feat. B.K.)	B.K., Timati	4:52
10.	"Welcome To Saint-Tropez" (feat. Blue Marine)	Michael Yousher, Timati	3:51
11.	"Love You" (feat. Busta Rhymes & Mariya)	James BKS Edjouma	4:09
12.	"Zajigalki" (feat. La Fouine & Jimi Sissoko)	garage.raver	4:21
13.	"Limb by Limb" (feat. Xzibit)	Xzibit	4:08
14.	"Groove On" (feat. Snoop Dogg)	James BKS Edjouma	3:50
15.	"Sexy Bitch" (feat. Kalenna Harper from Dirty Money)	Jordan "Trackstorm" Houyez	2:51
16.	"Сюрприз [Surpriz]"	B.K.	4:43
17.	"Ноты-Числа [Noti-Chisla]" (feat. Music Hayk)	B.K.	4:48
18.	"Наедине [Naedine]"	Michael Yousher	4:14
19.	"Всё кончается [Vsyo konchaetsya]"	B.K., Timati	5:45
Total length:			79:18

Special Edition Bonus DVD
No.	Title	Director (s)	Length
1.	"Forever"	Rezo Gigineishvili	4:26
2.	"Welcome To Saint-Tropez"	Konstantin Cherepkov	3:55
3.	"Groove On"	Pavel Hoodykov	5:50
4.	"Одноклассница [Odnoklassnitsa]"	Pavel Hoodykov	4:28
5.	"Boss Life (Documentary)"	Anna Kiselyova	14:51
