= Sergey Lazarev =

Russian singer (born 1983)

- Сергей Лазарев
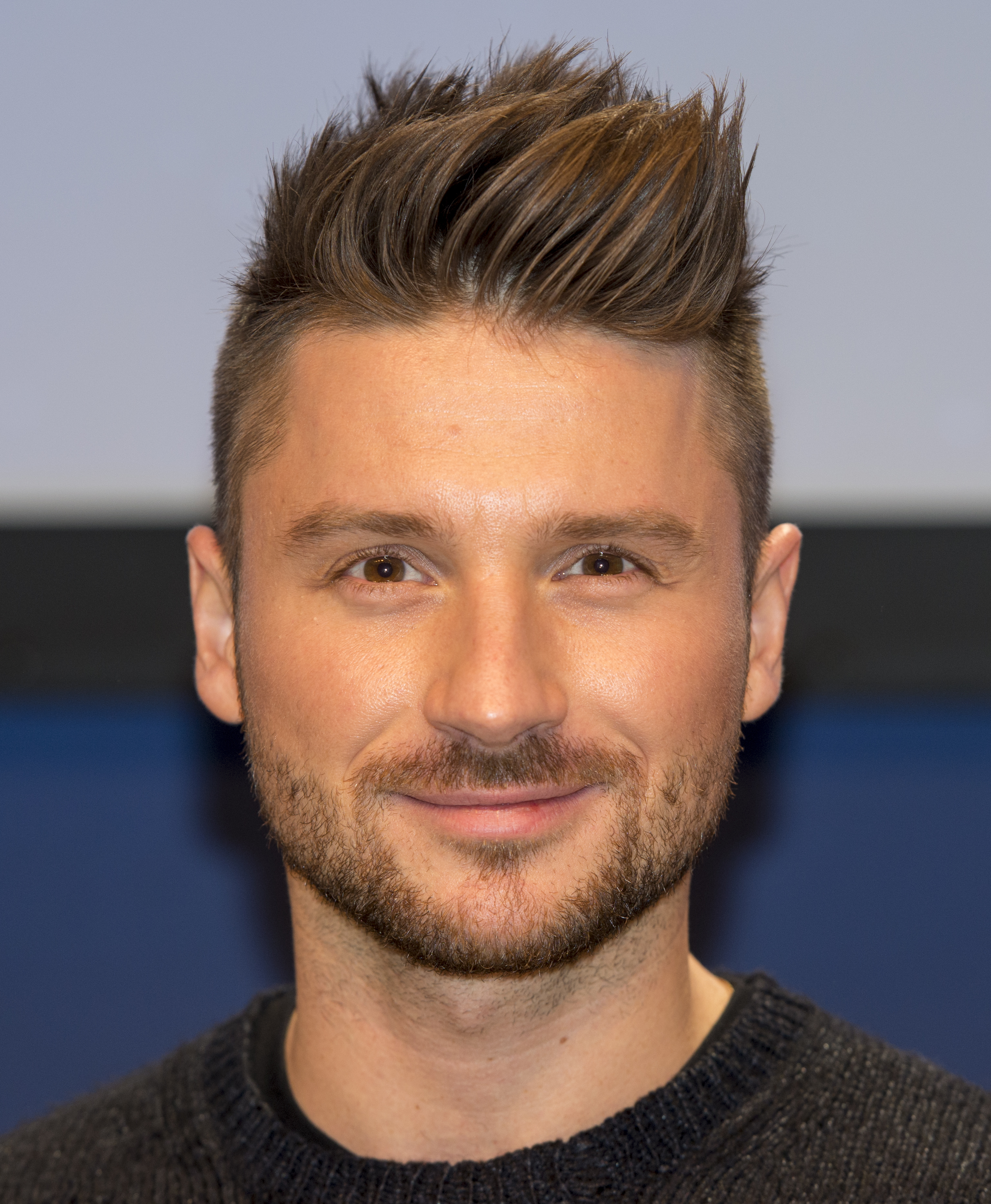
- Lazarev in 2016
- Born: Sergey Vyacheslavovich Lazarev; 1 April 1983 (age 43); Moscow, Soviet Union
- Occupations: Singer; dancer
- Years active: 1991–present
- Children: 2
- Musical career
- Genre: Pop
- Labels: Style; Sony Music Russia; Koala Music
- Website: sergeylazarev.fun

Sergey Vyacheslavovich Lazarev (Russian: Серге́й Вячесла́вович Ла́зарев, IPA: [sʲɪrˈɡʲej vʲɪtɕɪˈslavəvʲɪtɕ ˈlazərʲɪf]; born 1 April 1983) is a Russian singer. He is most famous for his singing career, when he rose to fame as a member of the group Smash!!. The group broke up in 2006. Since then Lazarev has pursued a solo career. He represented Russia in the Eurovision Song Contest 2016 in Stockholm, Sweden, and finished in third place, coming first in the televote. He represented Russia again at Eurovision Song Contest 2019 in Tel Aviv, Israel with the song "Scream", and similarly finished in third place.

During his career, he achieved international success in Eastern Europe, winner of Russian and international music prizes, including ZD Awards and Bravo International Professional Music Awards.

== Life and career ==
=== 1983–99: Early life and career beginnings ===
“All my childhood is connected with the stage, with the viewer, with the joy of victories and achieving goals, with the desire for self-improvement when I had to experience failures and defeats. But I never doubted that I would continue my musical activity, or rather, I did not even think about it, I just knew that it would be so. Because it simply cannot be otherwise. When the realization came that childhood was over, I realized that it was necessary to continue my musical career in a new quality. For some time it was completely unclear where to go next. And then everything turned out by itself."

— Lazarev's explanation about his childhood years.

Born Sergey Vyacheslavovich Lazarev on 1 April 1983 in Moscow, he was the younger of Valentina Viktorovna Lazareva and Vyacheslav Yuriyevich Lazarev's two sons and one daughter, being five years younger than his elder brother. The couple's daughter died in childbirth. His mother, Valentina, was graduated from an aviation school, while his father, Vyacheslav, was also graduated from an aviation school and worked as a soloist in the culture and arts community. When he was five years old, his father left home. After this divorce, her mother Valentina started a bed sheet sewing business in a cooperative in order to take care of her two sons. Later she married Mikhail Alexandrovich. Along with their mom; their stepfather, Mikhail, and grandmother, Zhanna Petrovna also played an active role in raising Sergey and his brother.

Lazarev grew up in Moscow, and since his childhood made it known that he wished to become a singer. From ages four to nine Lazarev practiced artistic gymnastics, and participated in various tournaments. However, he had to quit gymnastics due to an injury, about which he later said: "There were two things I liked most: standing on my head and singing songs. I liked jumping on the trampoline most of all. I was never afraid even though the first tournament I participated in did not achieve the success I expected. I continued to compete with tough rivals and finally won the first place. Unfortunately during this time I was seriously injured. Training has been very beneficial for me, I still have a flexible body like plastic. Even today I can walk on my arms for a long time." His transition from sports to music began with his participation in the children's song contest Utrennyaya zvezda. Before the age of 10, he took another step in his music career by singing in the Lokteus Children Choir. He sang at the Moscow Musical Theater, won several children's song contests, and ended up as a member of child group Neposedy, the same group in which Yulia Volkova and Lena Katina of t.A.T.u. met each other. Also his friend Vlad Topalov joined the band, who later would become the other half of Smash!!. In 1996, he took part in the presidential orchestra led by Pavel B. Ovsyannikov.

=== 2000–07: Smash!! band, Don't Be Fake, and TV Show ===
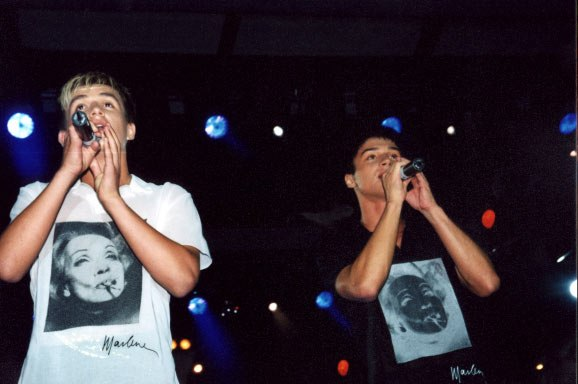
Sergey Lazarev and Vlad Topalov, performing as "Smash!!"

In 2000, Lazarev entered Moscow's MKhAT Theatre School and graduated in 2004 as a professional actor. In 1999 he enrolled at Russia's leading dramatic institute, the school-studio MAAT, and graduated with honors in 2003. As a student, Lazarev played the main parts in Pushkinski Theatre's productions of Romeo and Juliet, and Karamazov.

Lazarev's music career blossomed when he became part of Smash!! (Russian: СМЭШ!!), a Russian pop duo formed in 2000 by Lazarev and Vlad Topalov. At the beginning of 2002 the duo shot their first video clip for the song "Should Have Loved You More". Lazarev was excited with the video clip saying: "Everything was terribly exciting then - we recorded this duet, the disc with the record was distributed on radio stations, some even began to play it. And then the Universal Music Russia label drew attention to us, they offered us a contract for 3 albums. From that moment on, we never belonged to ourselves again - the recording of the album began, then the videos, then the tour... I woke up, one might say, only three years later." That August Smash!! won the New Wave contest in Jūrmala and in October 2002 Smash!! released their first single "Belle". The video for "Belle" topped MTV Russia's chart for 6 months and entered the list of top 20 clips of the past five years.

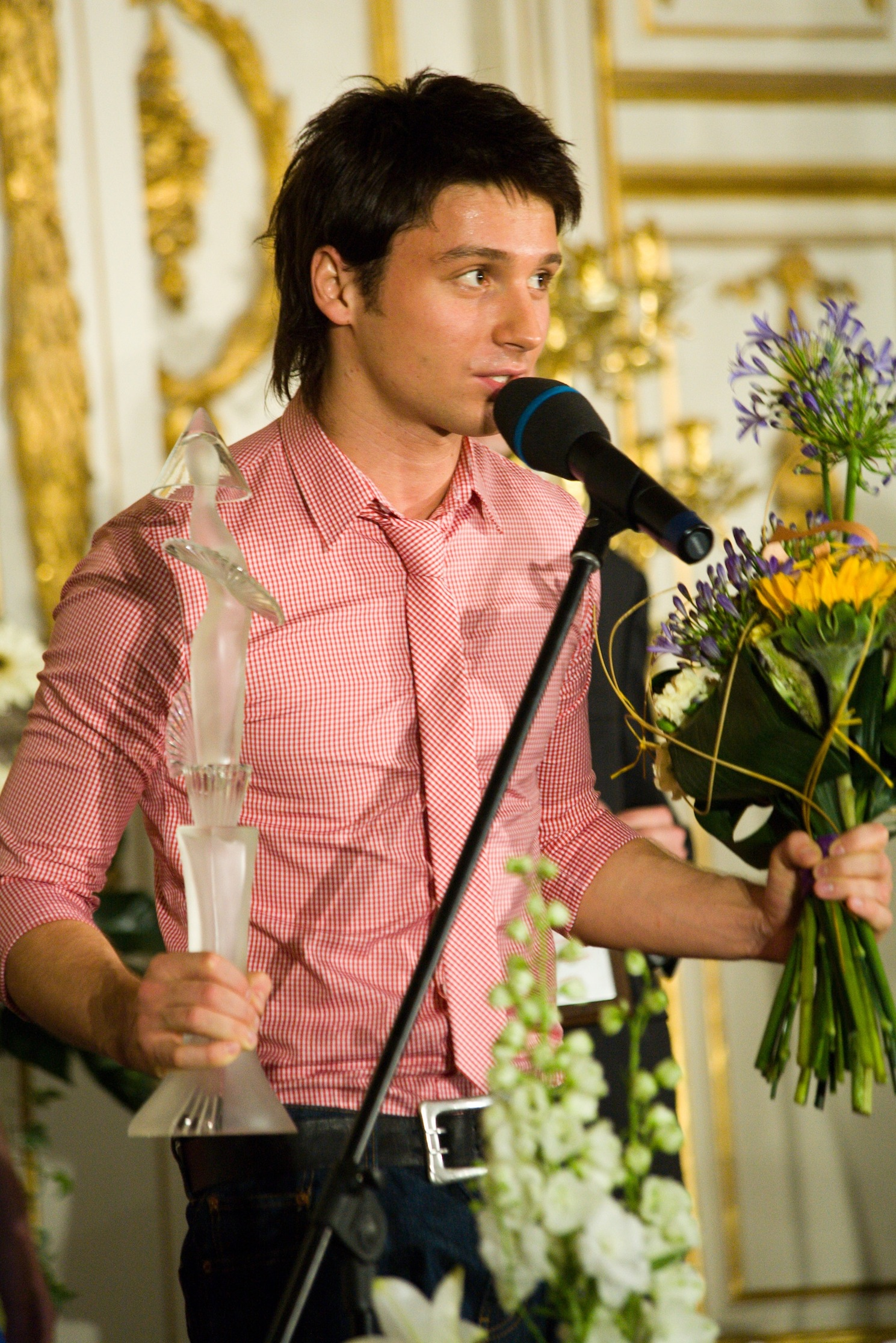
Lazarev during the "Crystal Turandot" award ceremony in 2006

In February 2003 the band finally released their debut album, Freeway. Over a million discs were sold in Russia and other nations in the Commonwealth of Independent States. Smash!! subsequently toured Russia throughout 2003.

The following year Freeway was released in East Asian countries including; Korea, China, Taiwan, Thailand, Hong Kong, Malaysia, Singapore, Indonesia, India, and the Philippines. The release of the album was followed by the promotional tour in the South-Eastern Asia, during which the band shot a video clip for the cover-version of George Michael's song "Faith" in Shanghai.

On 1 December 2004 Smash!! released the second album, 2Nite. The band split up only one week after the release, with both Lazarev and Topalov deciding to pursue solo careers. After the band disbanded, Lazarev has said that he valued input from his experiences in Smash!!. He further explained:

The bar that we set for ourselves in Smash !! was very high, and I am glad that I had the opportunity to work with people who gave me the opportunity to collaborate with world-class professionals, producers and musicians, authors and arrangers. When I started my solo career, the experience that I gained in Smash !! was very useful to me, after working in this duet I had all the prerequisites to develop further from a very high start.

Together with British producer Brian Rawling, Lazarev recorded most of the songs for his solo debut Don't Be Fake that was released in November 2005 and sold more than 300,000 copies in Russia alone. Album's first two singles, "Eye of the Storm" and "Lost Without Your Love", were soon released. The video clips of these singles were shot in Miami and South Africa, respectively. The third single "Daje Esli Ty Uydiosh (Даже Если Ты Уйдёшь)" (English: Just Because You Walk Away) became the biggest single from the album, peaking at #1 for many weeks, remaining on the charts for over six months, coming back to the charts twice more, and eventually reaching #2 in the annual airplay chart of most played songs in 2006. Due to the massive popularity of the song, the album was re-issued with bonus tracks including 3 versions of the song—the English version (which can be found on the first issue), the Russian version, and a dance remix also sung in Russian. Lazarev also performed the song at the MTV Russia Awards. The single was written by American songwriter Gordon Pogoda and Australian writer/artist John Stephan. The fourth single, "Fake", was plugged and the video clip was shot in London. Meanwhile the Fake Remixes EP was published. This was also promoted to some clubs in the United Kingdom. After the success of his first album, Lazarev went to the studio and recorded a new album TV Show. The video for the lead single, "Vspominay (Вспоминай)" was shot in Moscow. The English version of the song, "Everytime", was soon released along with the video clip, this one being similar to the Russian version. Consequently, releasing the video of the Russian version of the song "Almost Sorry", ("Зачем придумали любовь") this one being the fifth and last single of the album. Songwriters of the Russian version were Chris Landon, Taryn Murphy and Lara D'elia. In 2007, he placed first in the reality show Circus of the Stars, finished second in the Russian version of Dancing on Ice and performed Earth Song by Michael Jackson at the New Wave festival.

=== 2008–13: Electric Touch and Lazarev. ===
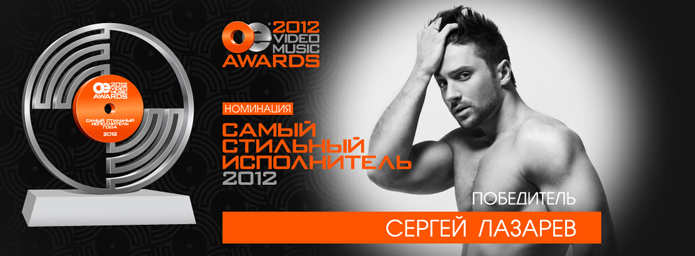
Lazarev wins the 2012 Video Music Awards.

In 2008, he was a candidate to represent Russia in the Eurovision Song Contest 2008 with the song "the Flyer". He finished fourth in Russia's national final, which was won by Dima Bilan. Furthermore, he was nominated in the category of Best Russian Act at the 2007 MTV Europe Music Awards, which again was won by Dima Bilan. During this time, Lazarev was dating television presenter Lera Kudryavtseva. As his international fame rose, he performed to full-capacity crowds at The Opera House in Bournemouth, England on 23 March 2008 as a supporting act to British dance group Booty Luv. Also in 2008, Lazarev won MTV's Artist of the Year Award. The same year, he took part in the New Year's Eve special program broadcast on Channel One. In 2009 Lazarev collaborated with artist Timati and made a video of the song "Lazerboy". In April 2009 Lazarev promoted "Stereo", the lead single for his third solo album and sang "Already Know" and "Out of Control". All four songs were expected to appear on his upcoming album, but only "Lazerboy" made the cut. On 31 March 2010 Electric Touch was released in Russian music stores. The video for "Alarm" was released on 10 May and on 26 June it was confirmed the song "Feeling High" was the new single from Electric Touch. Two months after the release, the album became the sales leader in Russia and certified gold by Sony Music.

On September 18, 2010, during the Rostov-on-Don City Day, his concert was interrupted by the organizers and his microphone turned off. In addition, whenLazarev wished to continue his concert later, this request was rejected by the organizers. A few days later, Lyudmila Lisitsina, head of the cultural department of the Rostov city administration, stated that Lazarev and those who worked with him had been previously informed about the duration of the stage use and that his later request was rejected because of the possible danger of the stampede.

In July 2011, they released a song called When You Tell Me That You Love Me with Ani Lorak for New Wave. Lazarev, Timati, and DJ M.E.G. collaboration followed this duet. Moscow to California was premiered 6 February 2012 via the web site of the Russian Billboard magazine. It was included in his album Lazarev.. By the end of 2012, his fourth studio album, Lazarev. was released. A few months later it became a bestseller in the country and Lazarev was once again awarded with Golden Disc. The same year, Lazarev released another English-language song, "Take It Off". On May 14, 2013, the music video of the track "Slyozy v moyom serdse" was released. Subsequently, another single "Stumblin'" was released and this followed by the release of the Russian version of the song, "Pyanya pesnya", on October 12.

Lazarev threatened to sue the social networking service VKontakte for its illegal placement of pirated copies of his songs even before their official release. He demanded to remove these copies, but instead, on December 12, 2012, almost all of Sergey's songs were removed from VKontakte "due to lack of cultural value" or "due to poor performance" (as it turned out later, this fate did not befall all songs). The singer himself was very unhappy with this fact, and later, he decided to sue the service.

=== 2014–15: The Best ===
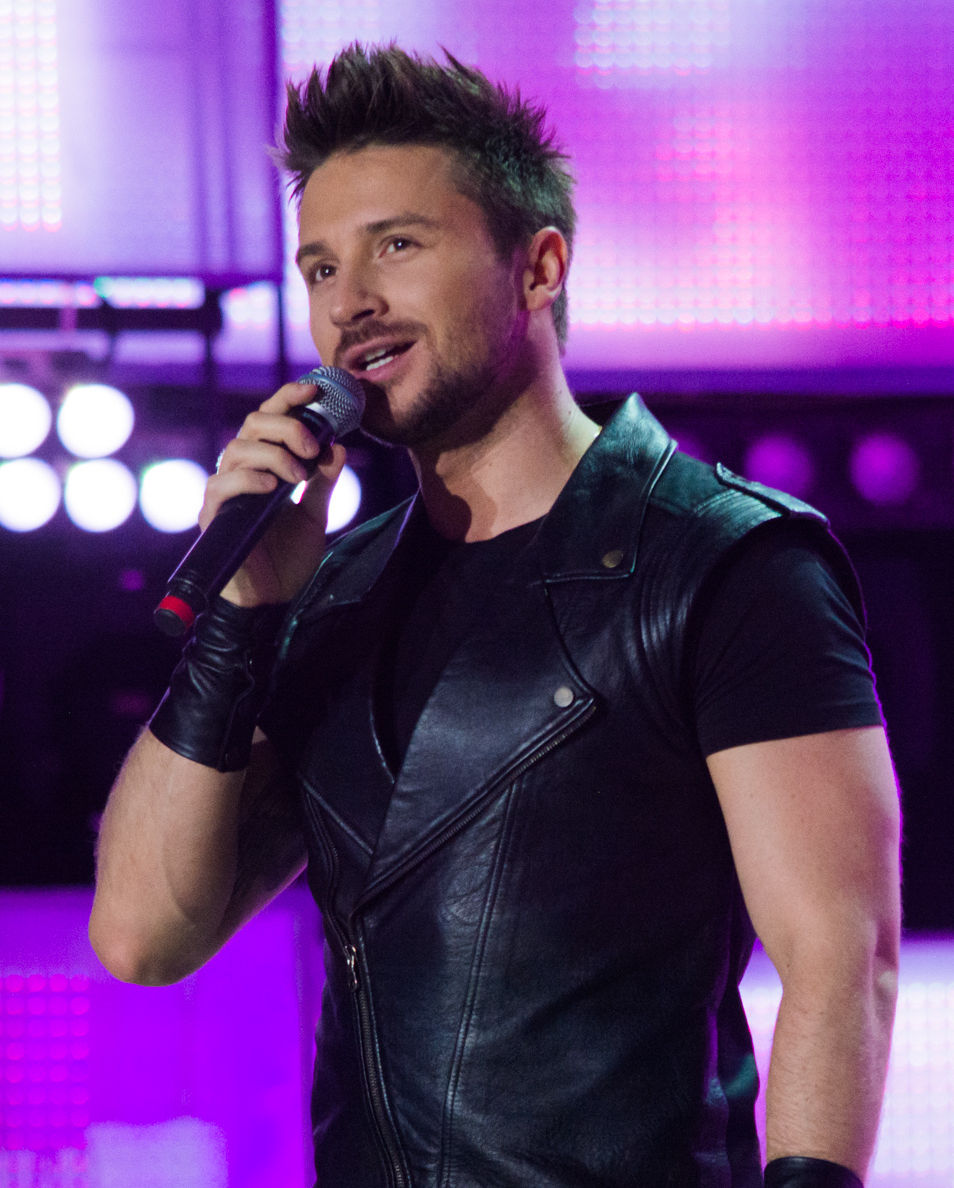
Lazarev in 2015.

The music video of "Take It Off" was premiered on March 2, 2014. On March 25, "7 Wonders" was released as part of his fourth studio album, Lazarev.. "7 Cifr" released later that year in September. In December 2014, he released footage of his March 30, 2013 concert at the Moscow Olympic Stadium as a concert album named Lazarev. Show: Live in Moscow. At the Muz-TV Awards, he won Best Concert of the Year award. In 2014, he was one of the juries of The Voice of Ukraine. Following the Russian annexation of Crimea during his stay in Ukraine, Lazarev stated to Ukrainian television, "Maybe my own Russian fans will throw tomatoes at me, but this is the way it is for me. When I travel to Yalta, for me it's Ukraine." However, in his later comments on Ukrainian television the singer said that his words had been taken out of context. Lazarev explained that in fact he meant that the territorial change was so instant that he could not get used to the idea that Crimea was part of Russia again and "need[ed] time to realize it"; the singer compared it to the feeling of those who remember the transfer of Crimea from Russia to Ukraine in 1954: "I perfectly understand those who, in 1954, suddenly woke up in Ukraine, and who wanted Crimea to return to Russia. I know, many are happy with that. But I need time to realize that". Lazarev added that the recording of his speech was shortened and edited by the Ukrainian TV crew so as to create "an anti-Russian interview" and regretted for being involved in an information war. In 2015, Lazarev participated as a host for Tanstuy!, a project of Channel One. At that time, he released Eto vso ona. His older brother, Pavel Lazarev, died in hospital on March 25, 4 days after the car accident.

The Best (Russian Edition), Lazarev's greatest-hits compilation album, was released on April 1, 2015 to mark the tenth anniversary of his solo career, when he also premiered music video for the song "Lucky Stranger". The video starred Maria Kravchenko from Comedy Woman and Alexander Gudkov from Evening Urgant. In October 23, Lazarev released English edition of The Best, along with the new single, "Hard To Love".

=== 2016–19: You Are The Only One and Scream ===
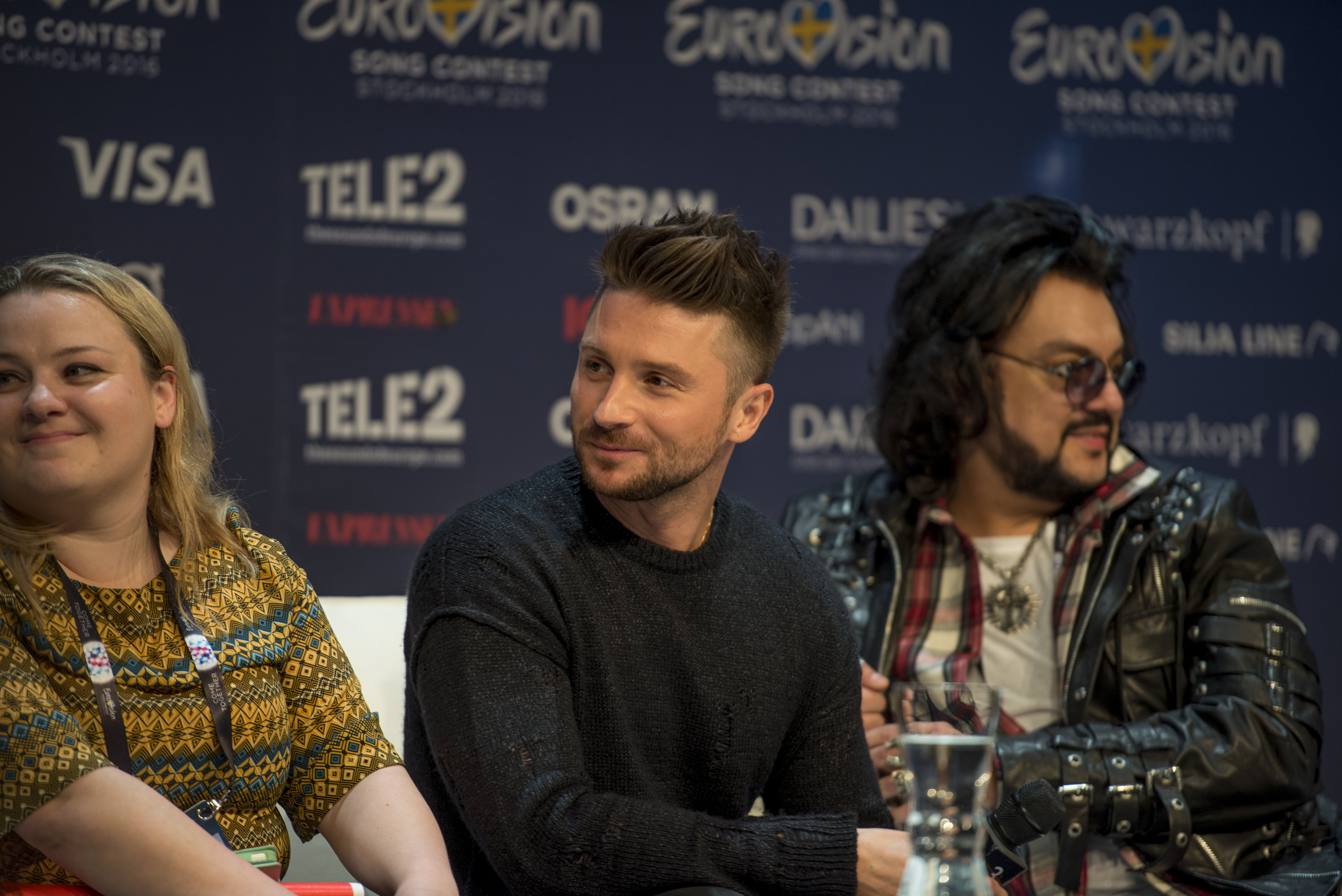
Lazarev at Eurovision Song Contest 2016 press conference.

On 10 December 2015, it was announced that Lazarev would represent Russia at the Eurovision Song Contest 2016 in Stockholm. The song produced by Philipp Kirkorov was later released along with its music video which features Miss Universe Russia 2015 Vladislava Evtushenko on 5 March 2016. Lazarev performed in the first half of the first semi-final and qualified to perform in the grand-final on May 14. In the grand final where he reached third place, Lazarev won the televote with 361 points, and came fifth with the national jury scoring 130 points. Lazarev revealed that he fell from the high platform during the rehearsals on May 2, 2016, and overcame the accident with bruises on his right leg without any injury afterward.

In December 2016, he announced that he has a two-year-old son, Nikita, after pictures of both attending church were captured by paparazzi. Speaking of having a child in an interview with Regina Todorenko, Lazarev stated: "Even when it became known that I have a son, some people said that this was not my son. He is blue-eyed, and I am brown-eyed. They said that this is not my child, and I am raising my brother's child, or he may be the child of my guitarist. These are all unfounded rumors." Then he added "The most interesting thing is that Nikita is very similar to me as a child. The same antics and habits. He constantly stands on his head. This is how my interest in gymnastics began as a child." Nikita was later featured in Lazarev's music video for "Tak krasivo" in 2017.

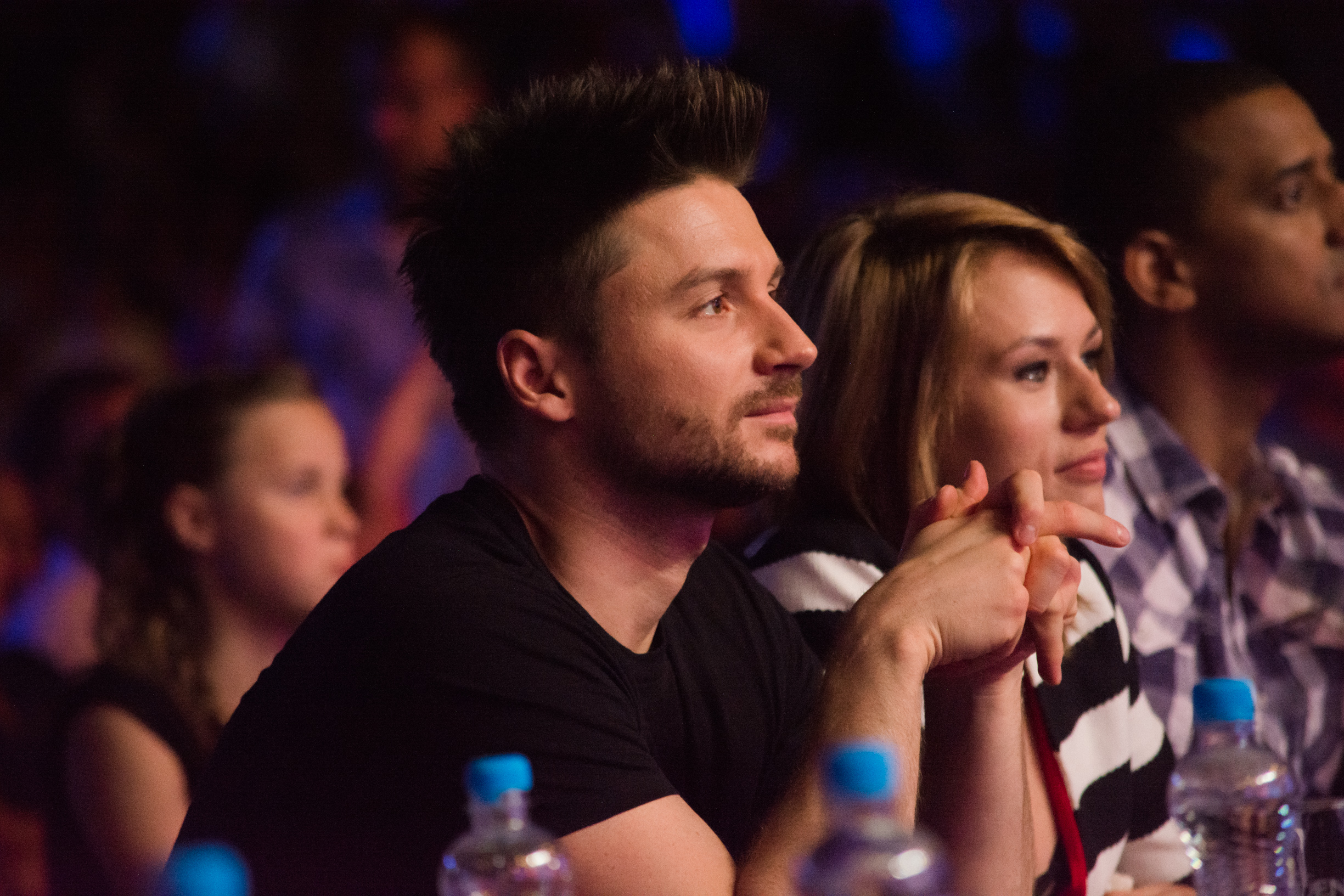
Lazarev at New Wave Junior as a juror, 2015

After a five-year absence of releasing an album, Lazarev released his fifth studio album, V Epitsentre, in December 2017.

On February 7, Lazarev announced that he would represent Russia in the Eurovision Song Contest 2019 in Tel Aviv, Israel with the song "Scream". He again finished third in the final.

== Personal life ==
In January 2023, Lazarev was sanctioned by the Ukrainian government following the Russian invasion of Ukraine, despite him earlier speaking out strongly against the invasion.

== Discography ==
=== Studio albums ===
Title	Details
Don't Be Fake	Released: 1 December 2005; Label: Style Records; Formats: Digital, CD; Certification: Platinum (NPPF)
TV show	Released: 10 May 2007; Label: Style Records; Formats: Digital, CD; Certification: Gold (NPPF)
Electric Touch	Released: 16 October 2010; Label: Sony Music Russia; Formats: Digital, CD; Certification: Gold (NPPF)
Лазарев. (Lazarev.)	Released: 18 February 2013; Label: Sony Music Russia; Formats: Digital, CD; Certifications: Gold (NPPF)
В эпицентре (V Epitsentre)	Released: 15 December 2017; Label: Sony Music Russia; Formats: Digital; Certifications: Platinum (NPPF)
The One	Released: 1 April 2018; Label: Sony Music Russia/WMG Russia; Formats: Digital
Это я (Eto Ya)	Released: 29 November 2019; Label: Sony Music Russia; Formats: Digital; Certifications: Platinum (NPPF)
Я Видел Свет (Ya videl svet)	Released: 27 October 2023; Label: Koala Music; Formats: Digital
Счастливые тоже плачут (Schastlivyye tozhe plachut)	Released: 28 March 2025; Label: Koala Music; Formats: Digital
Мы и Есть Любовь (My i Yest' Lyubov' )	Released: 11 July 2025; Label: Koala Music; Formats: Digital; Certification:

=== Extended plays ===
Title	Details
Я не боюсь (Ya ne boyus)	Released: 23 August 2019; Label: Sony Music Russia/WMG Russia; Formats: Digital
8	Released: 26 November 2021; Label: Sony Music Russia; Formats: Digital

=== Compilation albums ===
Title	Details
Лучшие Песни (Luchshye Pesni)	Released: 2010 (EU); Label: Monolit Records; Formats: CD
The Best	Released: 1 April 2015 (RU); 16 October 2015 (EN); Label: Sony Music Russia; Formats: Digital; Certifications: Platinum (NPPF)

=== Live albums ===
Title	Details
Шоу «ЛАЗАРЕВ» Live in Moscow	Released: 5 December 2014; Label: Sony Music Russia; Formats: Digital
Шоу N-Tour в СК «Олимпийский»	Released: 22 May 2020; Label: Sony Music Russia; Formats: Digital

=== Remix albums ===
Title	Details
London Club Remixes	Released: 15 August 2008; Label: Style Records/Moon Records; Formats: CD
Идеальный Мир Remixes (Ideal'nyy Mir Remixes)	Released: 17 February 2017; Label: Sony Music Russia; Formats: Digital
Stand By Me Remixes (featuring DJ Miller)	Released: 13 March 2019; Label: Sony Music Russia; Formats: Digital

=== Singles ===
Title	Year	Peak chart positions							Album
Title	Year	RUS	AUT	FRA	SCO	SPA	SWE	UK	Album
"Eye of the Storm"	2005	47	—	—	—	—	—	—	Don't Be Fake
"Lost Without Your Love"	2005	6	—	—	—	—	—	—	Don't Be Fake
"Just Because You Walk Away"	2006	5	—	—	—	—	—	—	Don't Be Fake
"Fake"	2006	7	—	—	—	—	—	—	Don't Be Fake
"Shattered Dreams"	2006	19	—	—	—	—	—	—	TV Show
"Everytime" "Vspominay" "Вспоминай"	2007	11	—	—	—	—	—	—	TV Show
"TV or Radio"	2007	72	—	—	—	—	—	—	TV Show
"Girlfriend"	2007	28	—	—	—	—	—	—	TV Show
"Almost Sorry" "Zachem pridumali lyubov" "Зачем придумали любовь"	2007	174	—	—	—	—	—	—	TV Show
"The Flyer"	2008	—	—	—	—	—	—	—	London Club Remixes
"Lazerboy" (featuring Timati)	2008	69	—	—	—	—	—	—	Electric Touch
"Stereo"	2009	18	—	—	—	—	—	—	Electric Touch
"Найди меня" "Naydi menya"	2009	18	—	—	—	—	—	—	Electric Touch
"Alarm"	2010	38	—	—	—	—	—	—	Electric Touch
"Feelin' High"	2010	33	—	—	—	—	—	—	Electric Touch
"Instantly"	2010	97	—	—	—	—	—	—	Electric Touch
"Heartbeat" "Биение сердца"	2011	26	—	—	—	—	—	—	Electric Touch
"Electric Touch"	2011	30	—	—	—	—	—	—	Electric Touch
"Moscow to California" (featuring Timati and DJ M.E.G.)	2012	19	—	—	—	—	—	—	Lazarev.
"Take It Off"	2012	69	—	—	—	—	—	—	Lazarev.
"Нереальная любовь"	2012	129	—	—	—	—	—	—	Lazarev.
"Cure the Thunder" (featuring T-Pain)	2013	40	—	—	—	—	—	—	Lazarev.
"Слёзы в моём сердце"	2013	138	—	—	—	—	—	—	Lazarev.
"Stumblin'"	2013	46	—	—	—	—	—	—	Lazarev.
"В самое сердце"	2013	8	—	—	—	—	—	—	Non-album single
"7 Wonders"	2014	35	—	—	—	—	—	—	Lazarev.
"7 Цифр" "7 Cifr"	2014	714	—	—	—	—	—	—	Non-album singles
"Это всё она" "In My Lonely Life"	2015	10	—	—	—	—	—	—	Non-album singles
"Весна"	2015	80	—	—	—	—	—	—	The Best (RU)
"Эх, лук-лучок"	2015	7	—	—	—	—	—	—	Non-album single
"You Are the Only One"	2016	18	40	53	71	49	34	206	The One
"Пусть весь мир подождет" "Pust ves mir podozhdyot"	2016	22	—	—	—	—	—	—	Non-album singles
"Чем измерить Сочи?" (with Звезды "Новой Волны")	2016	58	—	—	—	—	—	—	Non-album singles
"Breaking Away"	2016	199	—	—	—	—	—	—	The Best (EN)
"Идеальный Мир" "Idealnij Mir"	2016	81	—	—	—	—	—	—	Non-album single
"Лаки Стрэнджер"	2017	27	—	—	—	—	—	—	В эпицентре
"Lucky Stranger"	2017	209	—	—	—	—	—	—	The One
"Прости меня" (with Dima Bilan)	2017	252	—	—	—	—	—	—	Non-album single
"Сдавайся"	2017	25	—	—	—	—	—	—	В эпицентре
"Шёпотом"	2017	15	—	—	—	—	—	—	В эпицентре
"Так красиво"	2017	3	—	—	—	—	—	—	В эпицентре
"Вдребезги"	2017	—	—	—	—	—	—	—	В эпицентре
"Новый год"	2017	306	—	—	—	—	—	—	В эпицентре
"Холодный ноябрь"	2018	478	—	—	—	—	—	—	Non-album singles
"Пьяным, чем обманутым"	2018	—	—	—	—	—	—	—	Non-album singles
"Грустные Люди" (with Diana Arbenina)	2018	—	—	—	—	—	—	—	Non-album singles
"Scream"	2019	—	—	—	89	—	—	—	Non-album singles
"Лови" "Lovi" "Catch"	2019	14	—	—	—	—	—	—	Я не боюсь
"Я не боюсь" "Ya ne boyus" "I'm Not Afraid"	2019	12	—	—	—	—	—	—	Я не боюсь
"Бонни и Клайд" "Bonnie & Clyde"	2019	—	—	—	—	—	—	—	Это я
"Снег в океане"	2019	—	—	—	—	—	—	—	Это я
"Back in Time" (featuring DJ Ivan Martin)	2020	28	—	—	—	—	—	—	Non-album singles
"последний день помпеи"	2020	296	—	—	—	—	—	—	Non-album singles
"Лабиринт" "Maze"	2020	—	—	—	—	—	—	—	Это я
"Я не могу молчать"	2020	32	—	—	—	—	—	—	8
"Я не могу молчать (New Version)"	2020	339	—	—	—	—	—	—	Non-album singles
"Неодиночки" "Not lonely"	2020	—	—	—	—	—	—	—	8
"Неодиночки (Nostalgic EDM Version)"	2020	—	—	—	—	—	—	—	Non-album singles
"Ароматом"	2021	67	—	—	—	—	—	—	8
"Не отпускай" (with Ani Lorak)	2021	140	—	—	—	—	—	—	Non-album singles
"Снег" (with Evgenia Vlasova)	2022	94	—	—	—	—	—	—	Non-album singles
"Не пытайся повторить"	2023	26	—	—	—	—	—	—	Я Видел Свет
"Вкус Малины"	2023	39	—	—	—	—	—	—	Я Видел Свет
"Алый закат"	2023	42	—	—	—	—	—	—	Я Видел Свет
"Самообман"	2023	56	—	—	—	—	—	—	Я Видел Свет
"Загадай любовь"	2023	—	—	—	—	—	—	—	Я Видел Свет
"Я видел свет"	2024	—	—	—	—	—	—	—	Я Видел Свет
"Цвета одного"	2024	69	—	—	—	—	—	—	Я Видел Свет
"Если бы я мог"	2025	43	—	—	—	—	—	—	Счастливые тоже плачут
"Тут или Там"	2025	92	—	—	—	—	—	—	Мы и Есть Любовь
"—" denotes a single that did not chart or was not released.

== Tours ==
- Don't Be Fake Tour (2006–07)
- TV Show Tour (2007–08)
- Lazerboy Live (2009–10)
- Heartbeat Tour (2011)
- Lazarev Live (2013–14)
- The Best Tour (2015–17)
- N Tour (2018–21)
- Я не боюсь! Live (2022–25)
- Showman Tour (2025)

Date	City	Country	Venue
October 11	Saint Petersburg	Russia	Ice Palace (Saint Petersburg)
October 12	Saint Petersburg	Russia	Ice Palace (Saint Petersburg)
October 17	Moscow	Russia	Live Arena
October 18	Moscow	Russia	Live Arena
October 26	Yaroslavl	Russia	KZC Millenium
October 27	Yaroslavl	Russia	KZC Millenium
November 2	Omsk	Russia	G-Drive Arena
November 4	Barnaul	Russia	Titov Arena
November 8	Kemerovo	Russia	CRK Arena
November 10	Tomsk	Russia	DZiS
November 12	Novosibirsk	Russia	Sibir Arena
November 14	Krasnoyarsk	Russia	Grand Hall Siberia
November 15	Krasnoyarsk	Russia	Grand Hall Siberia
November 20	Ulan-Ude	Russia	Fizkulturno-Sportivniy Kompleks
December 2	Perm, Russia	Russia	Universal Sports Palace Molot
December 3	Yekaterinburg	Russia	МТС Live Hall
December 4	Chelyabinsk	Russia	МТС Live Hall
December 7	Kurgan, Kurgan Oblast	Russia	Kurganskaya Oblastnaya Filarmoniya
December 8	Kurgan, Kurgan Oblast	Russia	Kurganskaya Oblastnaya Filarmoniya
December 9	Tyumen	Russia	Tyumenskaya Filarmoniya
December 10	Tyumen	Russia	Tyumenskaya Filarmoniya
December 14	Khanty-Mansiysk	Russia	KTC Yugra-Klassik

== See also ==
- Russian pop music

Awards and achievements
Preceded by Polina Gagarina with "A Million Voices"	Russia in the Eurovision Song Contest; 2016	Succeeded by Julia Samoylova with "I Won't Break"
Preceded by Julia Samoylova with "I Won't Break"	Russia in the Eurovision Song Contest; 2019	Succeeded by Little Big with "Uno"
