= Escape (singer) =

Russian singer (born 1995)

- Born: Artur Edikovich Vardanyan; May 3, 1995 (age 31); Yerevan
- Genre: Pop
- Occupations: singer; musician
- Years active: 2019-present
- Label: Atlantic Records Russia

Escape (real name: Artur Edikovich Vardanyan; Russian: Артур Эдикович Варданян; born 3 May 1995, Yerevan) is a Russian pop & rap singer of Armenian descent.

== Biography ==
Vardanyan was born on 3 May 1995 in Yerevan. He spent his childhood in Novosibirsk, where he began to take up music.

In November 2019, he released his debut single "Амали." Escape first gained popularity in 2020.

In April 2021, together with Konfuz, he released a cover version of Yulia Savicheva's song "Не смотри." The song reached 13th place on the chart VK & 15th place on SberZvuk.

In June 2022, the artist released the track "Не похожи", which took 19th place on the VK chart.

He served as the speaker of "Zhara Kids Awards 2021", "Московском выпускном 2022" and other major concerts.

== Discography ==
=== Singles ===
- 2019 — "Амали"
- 2020 — "Аладдин"
- 2020 — "Цунами"
- 2020 — "Суперзвезда"
- 2020 — "Над уровнем неба"
- 2020 — "Эй, бейба"
- 2020 — "Lo Siento"
- 2020 — "Не уходи"
- 2021 — "Слёзы"
- 2021 — "Не смотри" (feat. Konfuz)
- 2021 — "Забудь о нём"
- 2021 — "Оранжевый закат"
- 2021 — "Игрушка"
- 2021 — "So Low" (feat. Danya Milokhin)
- 2021 — "Escape"
- 2021 — "Сердце не игрушка" (feat. Asammuell)
- 2022 — "Please don't break my heart"
- 2022 — "Don't cry"
- 2022 — "Не похожи"
- 2022 — "Broken Love"
- 2022 — "52 герца"
- 2022 — "Прощай"
- 2022 — "Moonlight"
- 2023 — "Нарисую"
- 2024 — "Someone Like You"
- 2024 — "Холодный Май"
- 2025 — "My love is a fire"
