= Rolls Royce (song) =

Single by Timati featuring GeeGun & Egor Kreed

from the album Transit
- Released: October 23, 2020
- Genre: Hip-hop
- Length: 2:23
- Label: Sony Music

"Rolls Royce" is a song by Russian hip hop singers Timati, GeeGun & Egor Kreed. It was released on 23 October 2020 as a single through the labels of Sony Music Entertainment & Timati and it was written by Eldar Bayramov, Egor Bulatkin & Sergei Demyanko.

== History ==
Three days before its release, a snippet of the song was posted. Also, at the end of the song "Звездопад," the cover of the song was shown.

== Music video ==
A teaser was released alongside the song.

The official music video for the track was released on 30 October 2020 года. In the video, Timati, GeeGun & Egor Kreed attack a sushi bar owned by their competitor, and it serves as a drug lab and money depository. At the end of the video, GeeGun, later revealed to be Sergey Bezrukov, betrays his accomplices. On the day it was released, the video garnered 2.5 million views and reached second place on the "Trends" section of the Russian segment of YouTube. The director of the video was Pavel Hoodyakov.
