= Danya Milokhin =

Russian blogger & singer (born 2001)

- Milokhin in 2021

Background information
- Born: Danila Vyacheslavovich Milokhin; December 6, 2001 (age 24); Orenburg, Russia
- Origin: Russia
- Occupations: Rapper; musician; vlogger; actor
- Years active: 2019–present

Danila Vyacheslavovich Milokhin (Note: Russian: Дани́ла Вячесла́вович Мило́хин;) (born 6 December 2001), better known as Danya Milokhin (Russian: Да́ня Мило́хин) is a Russian TikToker, rapper, musician, vlogger and actor.

In October 2020, the Russian version of Forbes placed Milokhin in sixth place on their inaugural list of highest paid TikTokers.

== Personal life ==
Danila Milokhin was born in Orenburg on 6 December 2001. His childhood was not easy; his father was an alcoholic, and his mother was divorced. For three years, Danila and his older brother were in a foster home, where the director was the adoptive mother of Yuri Shatunov and Valentina Tazekenova.

When Danila was 13 years old, he and his brother Ilya was adopted by a foster family.

At 16 years old he was addicted to narcotics, but later managed to overcome the addiction.

In October 2022, a former enforcer wrote a denunciation against Milokhin because he sang the Ukrainian anthem on a stream with Ukrainian TikToker Artur Babich. Following this, he flew to Dubai for a vacation, and then went to Los Angeles, US, but denied rumors of his emigration to the United States, later returning to Russia on September 8. On September 11, 2023, he left Russia for Dubai again after Ekaterina Mizulina demand to the Ministry of Defense to call Milokhin for compulsory service in the Armed Forces of the Russian Federation.

== Career ==
In 2019, he opened an account on TikTok, where he started to record and upload videos. During this time he lived in Anapa and worked as a waiter, later deciding to move to Moscow. At this time he gained the attention of Yaroslav Andreev, the founder of the agency WildJam, and invited Milokhin to participate in sponsorship events. The agency took over the work with other advertisers.

On 10 March 2020, he started a TikTok-team (commonly called TikTok house) under the name Dream Team House.

On 17 September 2020 he released a music video for the song Дико тусим, which Milokhin wrote with Nikolay Baskov.

On 21 April 2021, he released his debut album Бум, which came with eight songs.

In 2021, he took part in Sber's advertising campaign, starring in a number of clips and commercials. On May 17, Milokhin's clip for Sber and Visa's advertising campaign was released.

In 2021, he became one of the speakers of the St. Petersburg International Economic Forum, as well as its youth face. He was later criticized by Russian Foreign Ministry spokeswoman Maria Zakharova for "clowning" at the forum.

As of mid-July 2021, Danya Milokhin has more than 14 million subscribers on TikTok, over 3 million on Instagram.

In 2022, he was a member of the ice show Ice Age where he was paired with two time world champion Evgenia Medvedeva, but after some time, they were featured only four times, and right before filming a new episode he left the show after a scandal on Channel One, having fought with Ilia Averbukh and Medvedeva.

== Discography ==
=== Album ===
Name	Information
БУМ	Release: 21 April 2021; Label: Dream Team Family; Format: digital distribution

=== Singles ===
Year	Title	Charts			Album
Year	Title	Top Radio & YouTube Hits	Top Radio & YouTube Russian Hits	Top YouTube Russian Hits	Album
2020	Я дома	—	—	—	No album
2020	Khavchik (with Timati & GeeGun)	23	11	2	Транзит (album of Timati)
2020	Подонок	—	—	—	No album
2020	Потанцуй со мной	—	—	—	No album
2020	Лав	—	—	—	No album
2020	Дико тусим (with Nikolay Baskov)	190	—	46	No album
2020	Детство (with Artur Babich) (cover of the song by Rauf & Faik)	—	—	—	No album
2020	Есть только миг (with Maruv)	—	—	—	No album
2020	Обращение к 2020 году	—	—		No album
2020	Чётко (with Artur Babich)	—	—		No album
2020	Новый год (with Artur Babich, Oleg Liquidator & Klymtok)	—	—	—	No album
2021	Выдыхаю боль	—	—	—	No album
2021	Among Us (with Nikita Levinsky)	—	—	—	No album
2021	Единорог	—	—	—	БУМ
2021	Везде топ	—	—	—	No album
2021	Мама (with Sorry Jesus)	—	—	—	No album
2021	so low (with escape)	—	—	—	No album
2021	Башня (with Mumiy Troll)	—	—	—	No album
2021	Дико влюблены (with Nikolay Baskov)	—	—	—	No album
2022	Без капли мыслей	—	—	—	No album
2022	Выпускной	—	—	—	No album

== Ratings ==
- Highest paid TikTokers according to Forbes — 6th place
- Most popular TikTokers in Russia according to MTV — 10th place
- Top-5 singing stars on TikTok — 1st place
- In 2022, he placed 7th in the ratings of influential blogger Romir Influence Ranking.

== Awards and nominations ==
Year	Award	Category	Result	Notes
2020	GQ Man of the Year 2020	Breakthrough of the year	Won	
2020	End of year awards for 2020 according to the TV channel ТНТ Music	TikToker of the year	Nominated	5th place
2021	Influencers Awards	#PROMUSIC	Won	
2021	Cosmopolitan Man Awards		Won	
