= Moscow to California =

Single by DJ M.E.G. featuring Sergey Lazarev and Timati

from the album Lazarev.
- Released: 6 February 2012
- Recorded: 21 December 2011
- Genre: Dance, Pop, Hip-Hop
- Length: 4:03; 4:11 (video version)
- Label: Black Star Inc. Studio "MONOLITH"
- Producer(s): DJ M.E.G.

DJ M.E.G. singles chronology
"Show The Way" (2011)	"Moscow to California" (2012)	"Illegal" (2012)

Sergey Lazarev singles chronology
"Electric Touch" (2011)	"Moscow to California" (2012)	"Take It Off" (2012)

Timati singles chronology
"Requiem for Love" (2011)	"Moscow to California" (2012)	"I'm on You" (2012)

Moscow to California is a single by DJ M.E.G., featuring Sergey Lazarev and Timati.

It was premiered 6 February 2012 via the Web site of the Russian Billboard magazine. The vocal track was recorded 21 December 2011, and production was finished in January 2012 by DJ M.E.G..

Because Lazarev provided the lead vocals for the song, it was included in his album Lazarev.

== Music video ==
Semko Videos recorded a music video for "Moscow to California" 18 January 2012 in Miami (USA). The music video was directed by Pavel Khudyakov. In America, about 100 people were involved in the filming of the clip. After shooting ten locations in America, a group of actors and a director went to Moscow to shoot some scenes.

The video was presented in the Paradise club in Moscow on 23 February 2012. The music video was released using the World Wide Web on 8 March 2012.

== Versions ==
Single

No.	Title	Length
1.	"Moscow to California"	4:03

Remix

No.	Title	Length
1.	"Moscow to California" (DJ M.E.G. & N.E.R.A.K. Remix)	6:38

== Charts ==
Chart	Chart position
SNG (Tophit General Top-100)	19
SNG (Tophit Top-100 requested)	8
Russia (Tophit Moscow Top-100)	23
Russia (Tophit Saint-Petersburg Top-100)	13
