= L'One =

Georgian-Russian rapper (born 1985)

L’One / Леван Горозия / Levan Gorozia ლევან გოროზია
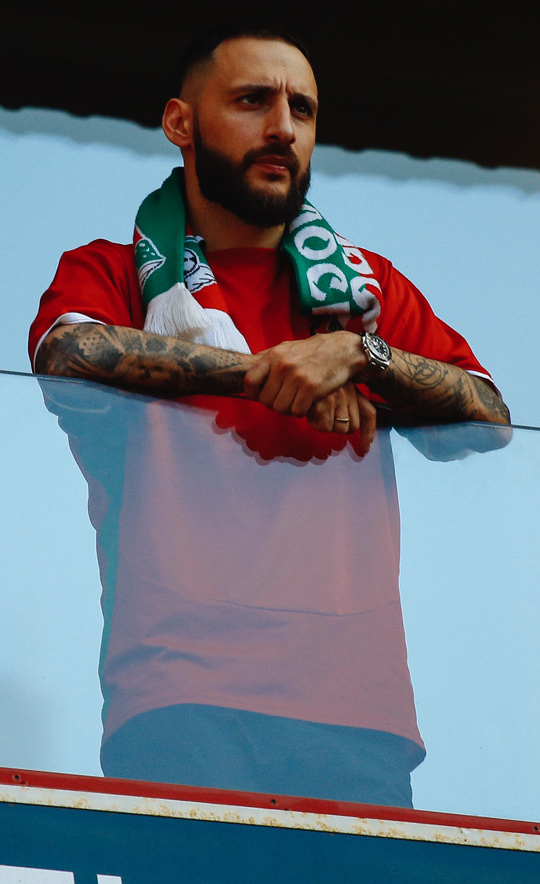

Background information
- Born: Levan Emzarovich Gorozia; October 9, 1985 (age 40); Krasnoyarsk, Russian SFSR, Soviet Union
- Genres: Hip hop; R&B; hip house
- Occupation: Musician
- Years active: 2005-present
- Labels: Phlatline, Black Star Inc.

Levan Emzarovich Gorozia (Georgian: ლევან ემზარის ძე გოროზია, Russian: Леван Емзарович Горозия) also known professionally as L'One and more recently as Levan Gorozia is a Georgian-Russian rapper, singer, and songwriter. Known for his solo career, for co-founding the WDKTZ (weedkatz) project with DJ Pill.One and for co-founding the hip hop group Marselle. From April 17, 2012, until March 16, 2019, Gorozia was an artist of Black Star Inc., where he released three space-themed studio albums. Gorozia is also the owner of his own clothing line label, 'Cosmokot', produced under the Black Star Wear brand. In 2019, after leaving the Black Star label, he lost the right to perform under the pseudonym L'One, and the right to perform with the tracks created under the pseudonym L'One. From 2019-2021 he performed under his real name. Following an agreement, he now performs under his pseudonym.

== Biography ==
Levan Emzarovich Gorozia was born in Krasnoyarsk on October 9, 1985. As a teenager, he moved to Yakutsk, where he began his career as an artist. Levan played basketball for the Yakutia national team, but following a knee injury he was forced to cease, and focused fully on his career in rap.

In Yakutsk, L'One was regarded as a celebrity. He was featured in KVN. He also worked on radio and TV. After the release of the first solo album in 2005, Levan moved to Moscow along with his friend Nel, where they formed the hip-hop group Marselle. Marselle's debut album "Mars" was released in 2008 and featured artists like Teona Dolnikova, Dza-Dze, Sasha Legend, Knara and Basta.. A track "Moscow" was featured in Timur Bekmambetov's movie The Darkest Hour. The track also topped the Next FM chart for 32 weeks. After this successful release, Marselle gained fame across the country and traveled all over Russia, receiving national recognition.

In 2008, L'One took part in the TV show BiTVa for Respect on the channel Muz-TV, where he published his first mix tape Mars FM. The show allowed viewers to see the process of recording tracks.

In 2009, he published a compilation of Phlatline in da building, celebrating the fifth anniversary of the label that he was signed with at the time. Included in the disc were new works from Marselle. Along with the album, music videos were filmed for the songs "Marselle and ST" and "In Your House". In 2010, he released his second mixtape, entitled L.

In May 2012, after his work with Phlatline was finished, L'One signed a contract with Black Star Inc., a hip hop label owned by Timati. His first release with the label was the album, Спутник in 2013. The single "Все танцуют локтями" from this LP became a hit and gave L'One's solo career a jump start.

Спутник and two albums that followed it, together, form a so-called "cosmic trilogy": Спутник (2013), Одинокая Вселенная (2014), Гравитация (2016). The trilogy tells a story of an astronaut traveling to Mars and back, as a metaphor of the artist's personal emotional experience from dealing with fame, work, and family.

L'One states that his obsession with space comes from his childhood when he dreamt of becoming an astronaut. Space theme is also used in his merchandise called "Cosmokot", i.e. cosmic cat.

As of June, 2019, L'One left the label Black Star Inc.

== Discography ==
=== Studio albums ===
- 2013 - Спутник (Satellite)
- 2014 - Одинокая Вселенная (Lonely Universe)
- 2016 - Гравитация (Gravitation)
- 2019 - Пангея (Pangea)
- 2020 - Рассвет (Dawn)
- 2021 - Восход 1 (Sunrise)
- 2023 - Дом (Home)
- 2024 - Пиросмани

=== EPs ===
- 2015 — "Автолюбитель" ("Motorist")
- 2016 — "С самых низов"
- 2017 — "1985"
