= TV Show (album) =

Studio album by Sergey Lazarev
- Released: 10 May 2007
- Recorded: 2006–2007
- Genre: Pop, dance
- Length: 65:22
- Label: Style Records
- Producer: Brian Rawling

Sergey Lazarev chronology
Don't Be Fake (2005)	TV Show (2007)	London Club Remixes (2008)

Singles from TV Show
- 1. "Shattered Dreams" Released: 2006; 2. "Everytime (Вспоминай)" Released: 2007; 3. "TV or Radio" Released: 2007; 4. "Girlfriend" Released: 2007; 5. "Almost Sorry (Зачем придумали любовь)" Released: 2007

TV Show is the second studio solo album by Russian singer Sergey Lazarev. The album was released in Russia on 10 May 2007 and features 12 English tracks, one Russian re-recording and 3 remixes which serve as bonus tracks for the album. Five tracks of the album were released as singles: "Shattered Dreams" (a cover version of the hit song by British band Johnny Hates Jazz), "Everytime" (along with its Russian version "Вспоминай"), "TV or Radio", "Girlfriend" and "Almost Sorry" ("Зачем придумали любовь" is the Russian version of "Almost Sorry", which was not included on the album). The album was recorded in London, England.

== Track listing ==
1. "Music Under My Skin" (P. Martin, T. Woodcock) – 3:10
2. "Everytime" (P. Barry, B. Davis) – 4:08
3. "Girlfriend" (P. Martin, B. Adams, M. Read) – 3:48
4. "Shiver" (G. Stack, P. Reine) – 3:10
5. "Breakthrough" (S. Balsamo, B. Robbins) – 3:26
6. "Rebound" (D. Frank, B. Adams) – 3:59
7. "Curiosity" (J. Taylor, B. Adams) – 3:37
8. "Shattered Dreams" (C. Datchler) – 3:15
9. "Almost Sorry" (C. Landon, T. Murphy) – 3:52
10. "Do Me Right" (A. Dannvik, M. Ek) – 3:15
11. "He Said She Said" (C. Mason, M. Ek) – 3:39
12. "TV or Radio" (S. Halldin, J. Thander, F. Westlund) – 3:16
13. "Vspominay" ("Вспоминай") (P. Barry, B. Davies, М. Bordyukova, S. Lazarev) – 4:08
14. "Shattered Dreams" (Metro Mix) (C. Datchler) – 5:52
15. "Shattered Dreams" (Kid 79 Mix) (C. Datchler) – 5:38
16. "Everytime" (Vorontsov Club Mix) (P. Barry, B. Davis) – 6:59

== Credits ==
Production

- Producers: Brian Rawling (tracks 1, 2, 3, 4, 5, 6, 7, 8, 9, 13, 14, 15), Måns Ek (tracks 10, 11), The Line Up (track 12), Ben Robbins (track 5).
- Executive Producers: Asya Kalyasina, Sergey Lazarev.
- Mastering: Dick Beetham for studio 360 Mastering, London.
- Design: Valera Kibiks for Agency of Creative Management - Supermarket of Culture.
- Photographer: Vlad Loktev.

Personnel

- Vocals, background vocals: Sergey Lazarev.
- Background vocals: Ben Adams, Donovan Blackwood, Tim Woodcock, Mark Read, Micki Flynn, Oskar Nilsson, Matias Garzon.
- Guitar: Adam Phillips, Christian Fast.
