= Smash (Russian band) =

Russian musical ensemble

Smash!!
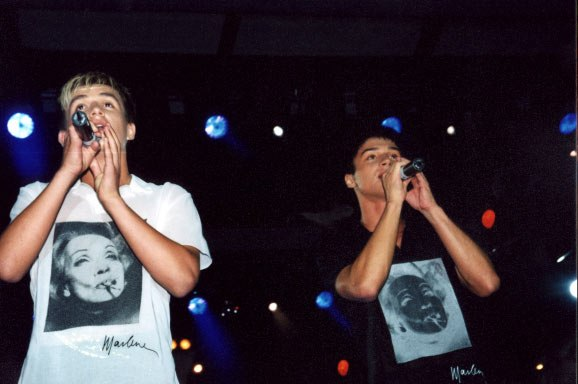
- Smash!! in 2002; Topalov (left) and Lazarev (right).

Background information
- Also known as: СМЭШ!!
- Origin: Moscow, Russia
- Genres: Pop
- Years active: 2001–2005
- Label: Universal Music
- Past members: Sergey Lazarev; Vlad Topalov

Smash!! (in Russian: СМЭШ!!) was a Russian pop duo formed in 2001 which consisted of members Sergey Lazarev and Vlad Topalov. They sang mainly in English, and were most popular among teenagers in Russia and Southeast Asia. The duo were the first winners of New Wave, winning the contest in 2002. Although the duo fell apart in 2004, Smash!! officially disbanded in 2005.

== Biography ==
=== 2000-2002: Beginnings ===
Vlad Topalov and Sergey Lazarev had both risen to fame as soloists of the popular Russian children's group Neposedy, which had enjoyed success in the 1990s on the Russian television show Morning Star. The idea of starting a duo between the two was born after they first sang a cover of the song "Belle" from the musical Notre Dame de Paris for Topalov's father Mikhail, who worked as a musician for Neposedy. Mikhail Topalov eventually initiated creating an actual group, naming the duo Smash!!. Mikhail Topalov then sent a recording of "Belle" to various radio stations. Universal Music Russia CEO David Junk heard the recording by accident on the radio and eventually signed the group up for a contract for three albums, hoping to create a masculine alternative to the success of t.A.T.u.

=== 2002-2004: Breakthrough in Russia ===
Topalov and Lazarev received a make-over before debuting their group on stage. Prior to the group's public release, both Smash!! members were naturally dark blonde. A stylist decided to dye Topalov's hair light blonde and Lazarev's hair brown. In April 2002, Smash!! released their first single, the English-language track "Should Have Loved You More". In the summer, the duo won the "New Wave" pop-music competition in Jurmala. In October, the band released their first single "Belle" and shot a music video for this song.

The group made their television debut during the first edition of New Wave, where they became one of the contestants representing Russia. After three contest days, Smash!! finished on top of the score board and were crowned as the winners.

In March 2003, the group released their debut album Freeway, achieving a double platinum status in their native Russia. The group also started to enjoy attention and commercial success in Southeast Asia. Smash!! then tried to represent Russia in the Eurovision Song Contest on two occasions. Both in 2003 and 2004, Smash!! entered a song to respective Russian broadcasters, but were both times refused. In 2003, t.A.T.u. represented the country and in 2004, Yulia Savicheva was given the honour.

=== 2004-2005: Lazarev's exit and disbandment ===
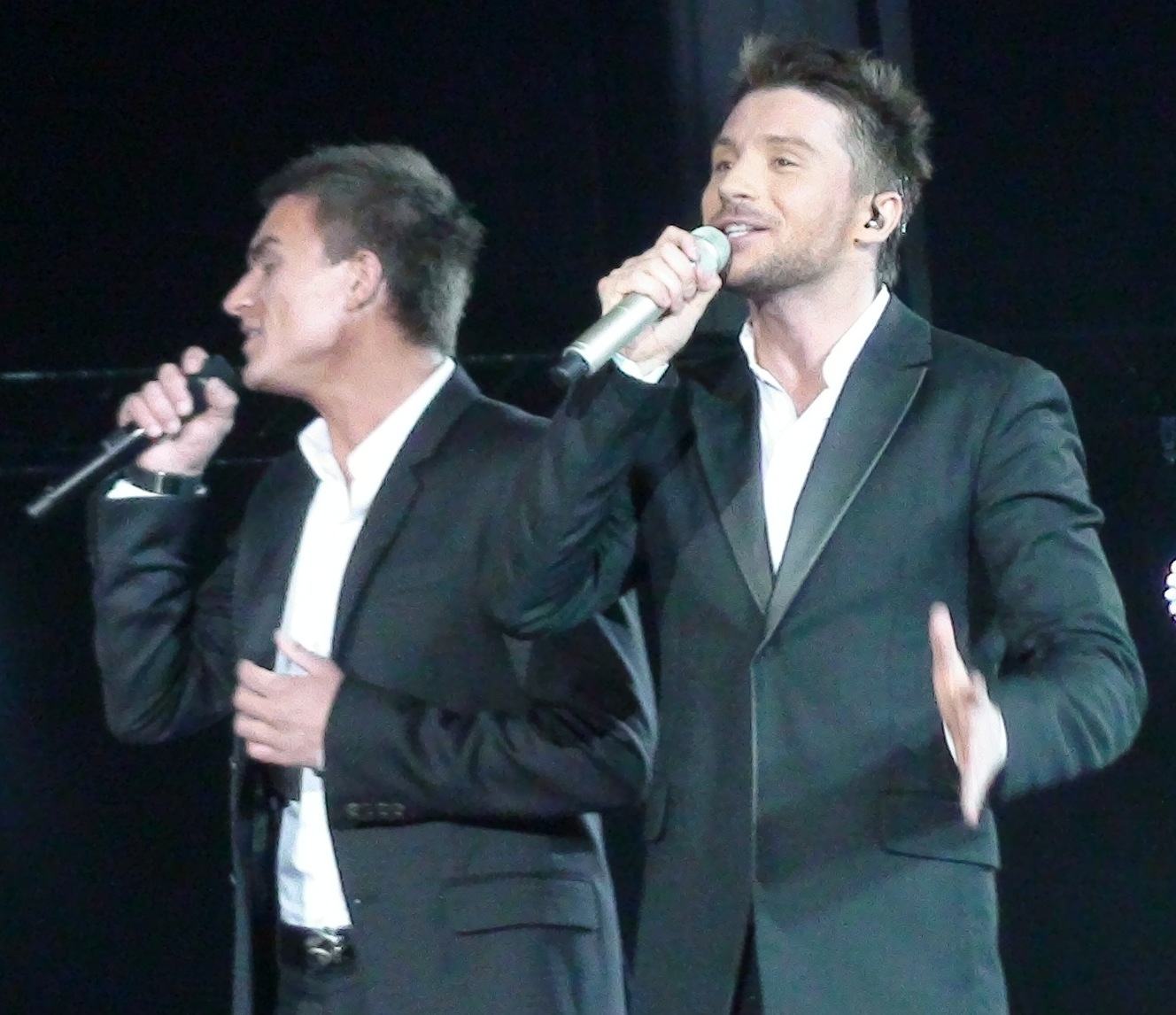
Smash!! shortly reunited in 2011 for a performance at Lazarev's concert.

Shortly after Smash!!'s second album was released, it was revealed that Lazarev had left the duo after he did not appear during the album presentation. Their last concert together was in Kyiv in December 2004. Topalov and Lazarev later cited tension between each other as the main reason for the duo to disband. Contributing to the tension were the rumours that Lazarev wanted to start a solo career without Topalov, Topalov's problems with drug addiction and general tiredness of each other.

As they were obliged by contract with Universal Music Russia to release a third album, they tried to reconcile. However, reconciliation attempts failed and Lazarev left the group for good. Their third album Evolution was released in 2005, only featuring Topalov's vocals. Both Lazarev and Topalov subsequently established solo careers.

After the official disbandment of the group in 2005, Topalov and Lazarev did not communicate for a long time. One of their first appearances together again was in 2011, when Lazarev invited Topalov to sing a duet at one of his concerts in Moscow. In 2017, Topalov told in a broadcast of Secret for a million that he did not consider Lazarev a close friend and that they only rarely talked. However, in a broadcast of the same show in 2019, Lazаrev and Topalov revealed that they had grown a close bond since and that the birth of their sons had brought them together again.

In 2021, Lazarev and Topalov again reunited as Smash!! to perform their song "Molitva" during a broadcast of the Russian version of All Together Now.

== Discography ==
Album Information
Freeway
- Released: 2003
- Singles: "Should Have Loved You More", "Belle", "Talk to Me", "Freeway"
2Nite
- Released: December 1, 2004
- Singles: "Obsession", "Faith"
Evolution
- Released: 2005

=== Singles ===
Year	Song	Album
January 2002	"Should Have Loved You More"	Freeway
October 2002	"Belle"	Freeway
March 2003	"Talk to Me"	Freeway
September 2003	"Freeway"	Freeway
May 2004 (September 2004 in India)	"Obsession"	2Nite
2004	"Faith"	2Nite
2004	"Мечта"	2Nite
