= Freeway (album) =

Studio album by Smash!!
- Released: 6 March 2003
- Recorded: 2002–2003
- Genre: Pop
- Label: Universal Music
- Producers: Ben "Jammin'" Robbins (tracks 1, 2, 5, 6, 9 and 10), Pam Sheyne (track 2), Mike Spencer (track 3), Andy Marvel (tracks 4 and 8), Aron Friedman (track 7), Keith Beauvais (track 7)

Smash!! chronology
Freeway (2003)	2Nite (2004)

Freeway is the debut album by Russian pop duo Smash!!. It was released in Eastern Europe in 2003 and Southeast Asia in 2004. It is primarily composed of English songs.

== Track listing ==
Original release

1. "The Real Thing"
2. "Talk to Me"
3. "Should Have Loved You More"
4. "Freeway"
5. "Make a Little Time"
6. "The One to Cry"
7. "Rich Boy"
8. "Don't Look Back"
9. "Gonna Be Our Night"
10. "Belle"
11. "Molitva (Молитва)"
12. "Talk to Me" (Energy Mix by That Black)

Re-release

1. "The Real Thing"
2. "Talk to Me"
3. "Should Have Loved You More"
4. "Freeway"
5. "Make a Little Time"
6. "The One to Cry"
7. "Rich Boy"
8. "Don't Look Back"
9. "Gonna Be Our Night"
10. "Belle"
11. "Molitva" (New Mix) (Молитва)
12. "From Souvenirs to Souvenirs"
13. "Zvezda Kak Sleza" (Звезда Как Слеза)
14. "Rich Boy" (Remix)

Asian release (2004)

1. "Faith"
2. "The Real Thing"
3. "Talk to Me"
4. "Should Have Loved You More"
5. "Freeway" (New Mix)
6. "Make a Little Time"
7. "Obsession"
8. "The One to Cry"
9. "Rich Boy"
10. "Don't Look Back"
11. "Gonna Be Our Night"
12. "Belle" (Notre Dame Paris)
13. "Freeway"
14. "Rich Boy" (Remix)
