= DJ M.E.G. =

Russian DJ (born 1982)

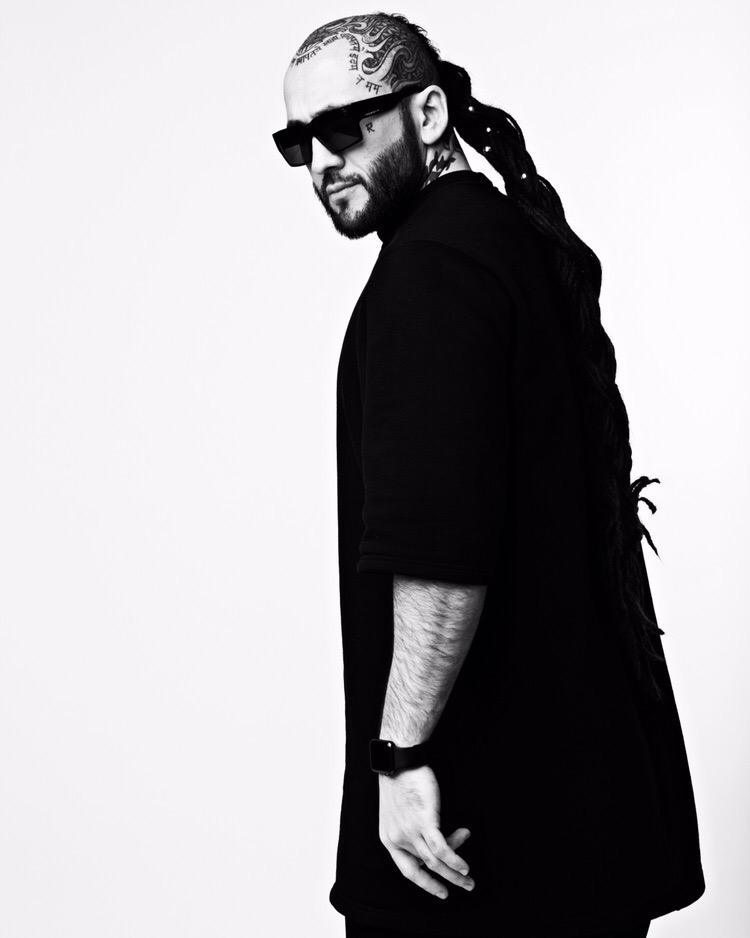
- DJ M.E.G.

Background information
- Also known as: DJ M.E.G.
- Born: Eduard Georgievich Magaev; 20 December 1982 (age 43)
- Origin: North Ossetia–Alania, Russia
- Genres: Electro house, progressive house, Dutch house, trap
- Occupations: DJ, record producer, remixer
- Instrument: Logic Pro Ableton
- Years active: 2008—present
- Labels: Black Hole Recordings, Burn The Fire Records.
- Website: dj-meg.com

Eduard Georgievich Magaev (Russian: Эдуард Георгиевич Магаев, born 20 December 1982), better known by his stage name DJ M.E.G., is a Russian DJ and record producer. M.E.G. was a former member of duo M.E.G. & N.E.R.A.K. alongside DJ N.E.R.A.K.. and is often associated with fellow Russian acts Swanky Tunes and Hard Rock Sofa. He mixes electro house and trap music in his productions.

== Biography ==
In year 2006, at the beginning of his DJ career, Eduard Magaev was signed to Russian Hip-Hop label Black Star inc. While being signed to this label, DJ M.E.G. worked with Russia's mainstream POP artists like Timati, Sergey Lazarev, Karina Koks, and more. On January 28-th 2013 he released single DJ M.E.G. & N.E.R.A.K. «Rock The Beat» on Tiesto's record label Black Hole Recordings. Track entered label's EP «Electro House EP 002». Then he released "Antares" and Crux on Burn The Fire Records. On February 16-th 2013, his remix "Duher и M-3ox - Girls (DJ M.E.G. & N.E.R.A.K. remix) was supported by David Guetta.

== Discography ==
=== Singles ===
2010

- «Можешь только ты» / «Only You» (feat. Karina Koks)
- «Party Animal» (feat. Timati)

2011

- «Make Your Move» (feat. B.K.)
- «Light» (feat. Globass & B.K.)
- «Там где ты» (feat. Karina Koks)
- «Ayo» (feat. Karina Koks & B.K.)
- «Freeworld» (feat. Demirra)
- «Show The Way» (feat. Demirra)

2012

- «Moscow to California» (feat. Sergey Lazarev & Timati)
- «Illegal» (Shaka Muv feat. DJ M.E.G.)
- «My Name Is Optimus Prime» (feat. N.E.R.A.K.)
- «Turn the Volume Up» (feat. N.E.R.A.K. & Demirra)
- «Stock-Holm»
- «Не с тобой» (B.K. feat. M.E.G., prod. by DJ M.E.G.)
- «Rumble (Trap Era Mix)» (feat. N.E.R.A.K.)
- «Al Pachino»
- «Calipso»

2013

- «Rock The Beat» (feat. N.E.R.A.K.)
- «Antares» (feat. N.E.R.A.K.)
- «Crux» (feat. N.E.R.A.K.)
- «На краю земли» (feat. N.E.R.A.K. & Karina Koks)
- «Угар» (feat. Serebro)

=== Remixes ===
M-3ox & Duher feat. AjB — «Girls» (DJ M.E.G. & N.E.R.A.K. Remix)
