= GeeGun =

Russian-Ukrainian singer (born 1985)

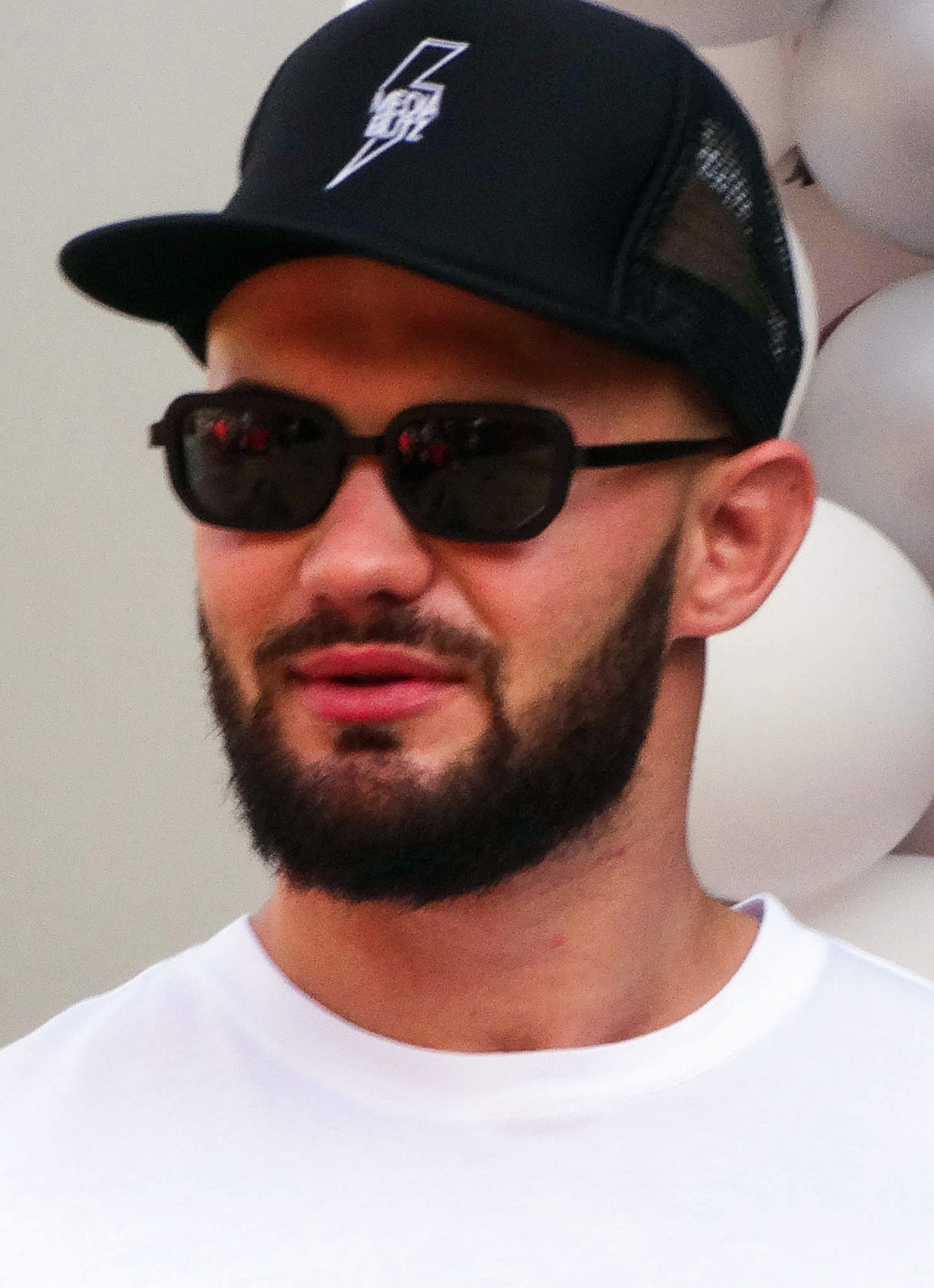
- GeeGun

Background information
- Born: Denis Aleksandrovich Ustimenko-Veinshtein; 2 August 1985 (age 41); Odesa, Ukrainian SSR, Soviet Union
- Genre: Hip hop
- Occupations: Rapper; singer
- Years active: 2004-present

Denis Aleksandrovich Ustimenko-Veinshtein (Russian: Денис Александрович Устименко-Вейнштеин; Ukrainian: Денис Олександрович Устименко-Вейнштейн, romanized: Denys Oleksandrovych Ustymenko-Veynshteyn; born 2 August 1985), better known by his stage name GeeGun (Russian and Ukrainian: Джиган), is a Ukrainian rapper and singer.

== Biography ==
Vaynshtein was born on 2 August 1985 in Odesa.

On 30 June 2017 he released his fifth studio album «Дни и ночи», consisting of 12 tracks.

In December 2017 with the single «Дни и ночи», GeeGun became a winner at the «VK Music Awards».

On 8 June 2018 on the award show «МУЗ-ТВ», GeeGun received an award for «best hip-hop project of the year».

On 25 July, the song «ДНК» achieved the status of quadruple platinum; 400,000 copies were sold.

On 27 May 2019, at the Russian award show RU.TV GeeGun was nominated for «best hip-hop project».

On 12 May 2020 GeeGun officially reconciled with Timati, with whom he had a conflict with.

== Personal life ==
On 27 July 2011, his daughter Ariela was born.

On 3 September 2014 his daughter Leya was born.

On 27 April 2017 his daughter Maya was born.

On 18 February 2020 his son David was born.

== Social-political positions ==
In 2022, in response to Russia's invasion of Ukraine, he criticized those fleeing Russian mobilization efforts.

He attended the Almost Naked Party held in a Moscow nightclub in December 2023.

== Sports achievements ==
At the age of 7 years old he started to take up sports: boxing, Thai boxing & kickboxing. He became a kickboxing master in Ukraine. To this day, GeeGun is constantly active in sports.

== Discography ==
=== Studio albums ===
- 2012 — «Холодное сердце»
- 2013 — «Музыка. Жизнь.»
- 2015 — «Твой выбор»
- 2016 — «Джига»
- 2017 — «Дни и ночи»
- 2019 — «Край рая»

=== Singles ===
- 2012 — «Ты чемпион»
- 2012 — «Поиграем в любовь»
- 2012 — «Прогноз — зима» (feat. Теоны Дольниковой)
- 2012 — «О тебе» (feat. Artik)
- 2012 — «Тесно» (feat. Мулата)
- 2012 — «Деньги» (feat. Сосо Павлиашвили)
- 2012 — «Холодное сердце»
- 2012 — «Нас больше нет»
- 2013 — «На край света»
- 2013 — «Жизнь моя» (feat. Полины Скай)
- 2013 — «Береги любовь» (при уч. Лои)
- 2013 — «Держи меня за руку»
- 2014 — «#Надоподкачаться»
- 2015 — «Не со мной» (feat. Доминик Джокер)
- 2015 — «Ахумилительная туса»
- 2015 — «Я и ты»
- 2015 — «Любить больше нечем» (feat. Yulia Sevicheva)
- 2015 — «Дождь» (feat. MakSim)
- 2016 — «Любовь-наркоз» (feat. Stas Mikhaylov)
- 2016 — «Всё будет хорошо» (feat. Asti)
- 2016 — «Мелодия» (feat. Jah Khalib)
- 2016 — «Мой мир» (feat. Asti)
- 2016 — «Долетай» (feat. Саши Жемчуговой)
- 2016 — «До последнего вздоха» (feat. Basta)
- 2016 — «Нас больше нет»
- 2017 — «Дни и ночи»
- 2017 — «Лови меня»
- 2018 — «ДНК» (feat. Artyom Kacher)
- 2018 — «777»
- 2018 — «Молоды мы»
- 2018 — «На восьмом этаже»
- 2018 — «Наутро» (при уч. Grigory Leps)
- 2019 — «Голые ладони» (feat. Ганвест)
- 2019 — «Плавно»
- 2019 — «Таких не бывает» (feat. Artik & Asti)
- 2019 — «Я Буду...» (feat. Софии Берг)
- 2019 — «Кислород» (feat. Bahh Tee)
- 2020 — «Для неё» (feat. Зомб)
- 2020 — «Тайны»
- 2020 — «Jiggy» (Remix) (feat. Индаблэка)
- 2020 — «Khavchik» (feat. Timati & Danya Milokhin)
- 2020 — «Rolls Royce» (feat. Timati & Egor Kreed)
- 2021 — «На чиле» (feat. Egor Kreed, The Limba, Blago White, OG Buda, Timati, Soda Luv & Guf)
- 2022 — «Pime Time»
- 2023 — «Танцуй со мной» (feat. Mayot & Vacio)

== Videography ==
Year	Title	Chart					Album
Year	Title	Russian radio chart	Moscow radio chart	Ukrainian radio chart	Kyiv radio chart	Latvia Radio Chart	Album
2010	«Холодное сердце» (feat. Anna Sedokova)	181	198	—	28	—	Холодное сердце
2011	«Отпусти» (feat. Yulia Savicheva)	8	13	7	6	8	Холодное сердце
2011	«Ты рядом» (feat. Jeanna Friske)	71	—	27	37	9	Холодное сердце
2012							Холодное сердце
2012	«Нас больше нет»	23	34	16	18	14	Холодное сердце
2012	«Держи меня за руку»	104	—	—	—	—	Музыка. Жизнь.
2013	«На край света»	132	—	—	—	—	Музыка. Жизнь.
2013	«Береги любовь» (feat. Лоя)	149	—	—	—	—	Музыка. Жизнь.
2014	«Небо» (feat. Asti)	169	—	—	—	—	Музыка. Жизнь.
2014	«Любить Больше Нечем» (feat. Yulia Savicheva)	5	15	—	—	5	Твой Выбор
2015	«Я и ты»	181	8	—	—	8	Твой Выбор
2017	«Дни и ночи»	85	56	33	—	—	Дни и ночи
Symbol «—» means, that the song did not chart.

== Videography ==
- 2007 — «Baby Boy» (feat. RI & XL Deluxe)
- 2008 — «Грязные шл**ки» (feat. Timati & Титомир)
- 2009 — «Всё ровно» (feat. DJ Nik-One & Smoky Mo)
- 2009 — «Одноклассница» (feat. Timati)
- 2010 — «Холодное сердце» (feat. Anna Sedokova)
- 2010 — «Одесса-мама»
- 2010 — «Мои мысли» (feat. Мулат)
- 2011 — «Отпусти» (feat. Yulia Savicheva)
- 2011 — «Будь собой» (with Black Star Mafia)
- 2011 — «Ты рядом» (feat. Jeanna Friske)
- 2012 — «Ты чемпион»
- 2012 — «Карнавал» (feat. Дискотека Авария & Вика Крутая)
- 2012 — «Нас больше нет»
- 2012 — «Тесно» (feat. Мулат)
- 2012 — «Глаза» (feat. Artik)
- 2012 — «Tattoo» (with Black Star Mafia)
- 2012 — «Держи меня за руку»
- 2013 — «Туса» (with Black Star Mafia)
- 2013 — «На край света»
- 2013 — «Встреча» (feat. Таня Терёшина)
- 2013 — «Жизнь моя» (feat. Полина Скай)
- 2013 — «Береги любовь» (feat. Лоя)
- 2014 — «#Надо подкачаться»
- 2014 — «Небо» (feat. Asti)
- 2014 — «Любить больше нечем» (feat. Yulia Savicheva)
- 2015 — «Время похудеть»
- 2015 — «Твой Выбор»
- 2015 — «Я и ты»
- 2015 — «Ахумилительная туса»
- 2015 — «Дождь» (feat. MakSim)
- 2016 — «Любовь—наркоз» (feat. Stas Mikhaylov)
- 2016 — «Всё будет хорошо» (feat. Asti)
- 2016 — «Должен сиять»
- 2016 — «Карма»
- 2016 — «Готов на всё» (feat. Базиль)
- 2016 — «Бентли»
- 2016 — «Долетай» (feat. Sasha Zhemchugova)
- 2017 — «Мелодия» (feat. Jah Khalib)
- 2017 — «Дни и ночи»
- 2017 — «Больше чем жизнь»
- 2018 — «ДНК» (feat. Artyom Kacher)
- 2018 — «Молоды мы»
- 2018 — «На восьмом этаже»
- 2019 — «Плавно»
- 2019 — «Таких не бывает» (feat. Artik & Asti)
- 2019 — «Я Буду...» (при уч. София Берг)
- 2019 — «Кислород» (feat. Bahh Tee)
- 2020 — «Тайны»
- 2020 — «Хавчик» (feat Timati & Danya Milokhin)
- 2020 — «Rolls Royce» (feat. Timati & Egor Kreed)
- 2021 — «На чиле» (feat. Egor Kreed, The Limba, blago white, OG Buda, Timati, Soda Luv & Guf)

=== Guest appearances in music videos of other singers ===
- Timati — «Звездопад»
- YurKiss — «Бабки есть»
- Egor Kreed, Dzharakhov & Buster — «Самый худший трек»
- Doni, Harrt & Dj Daveed — «Лучшая попса»
- Egor Kreed — «We Gotta Get Love»

== Soundtracks ==
- 2012 — «Ты чемпион» (OST «Goon»)

== See also ==
- Ukrainians in Russia
