= Timati =

Russian rapper (born 1983)

Timati Тимати
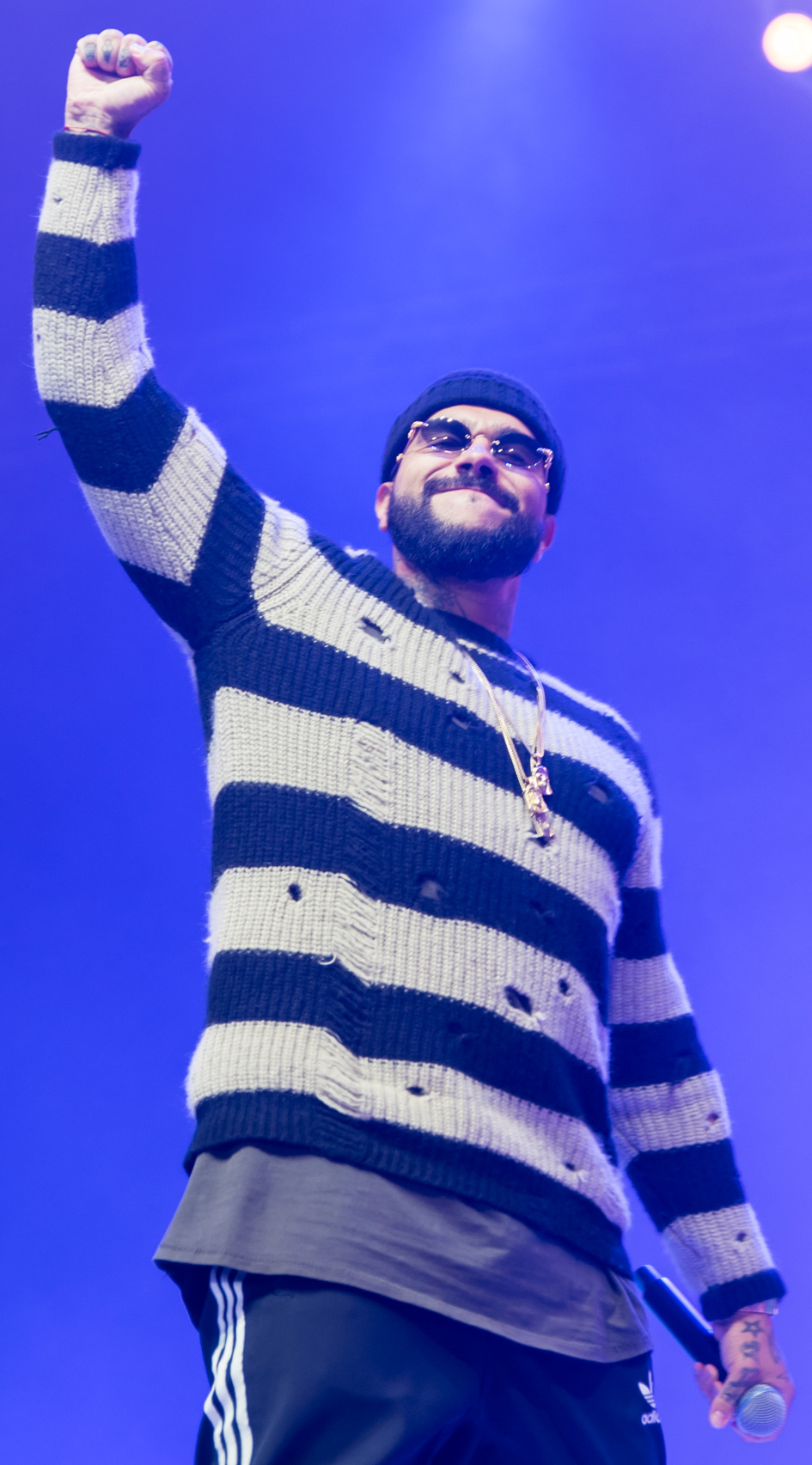
- Timati in 2018

Background information
- Born: Timur Ildarovich Yunusov; 15 August 1983 (age 43); Moscow, Russian SFSR, Soviet Union
- Genres: Russian hip hop; R&B; trap
- Occupations: Rapper; singer; songwriter; record producer; actor; entrepreneur
- Labels: Timati (since 2020); Black Star Group (2006–2020); SBA Production/Gala Records (2004–2013)

Timur Ildarovich Yunusov (Russian: Тимур Ильдарович Юнусов; born 15 August 1983), better known by his stage name Timati (Russian: Ти́мати), is a Russian rapper, singer, record producer, actor, and entrepreneur.

== Biography ==
=== Early life ===
Timur Ildarovich Yunusov (Tatar: Тимур Илдар улы Юнысов, romanized: Timur İldar ulı Yunısov, Russian: Тиму́р Ильда́рович Юну́сов) was born on 15 August 1983 in Moscow to an ethnically mixed family of Tatar father Ildar Vakhitovich Yunusov and Jewish mother Simona Yakovlevna Yunusova (née Chernomorskaya); he also has a younger brother, Artyom. He grew up in a wealthy industrialist family, saying "I have very wealthy parents", but "I was never spoiled."

He was raised mainly on Mira Avenue in Moscow. His current stage name "Timati" has stuck with him since he was young. Yunusov also lived in Los Angeles for 3 years. At the urgent request of his grandfather, composer and conductor Yakov Chervomorsky, Timur graduated from violin class in music school. He studied at the Higher School of Economics, and finished his third year, but left to focus on his music career. He later became associated with the YPS squad. His first single came out with Konaldo.

=== Career ===
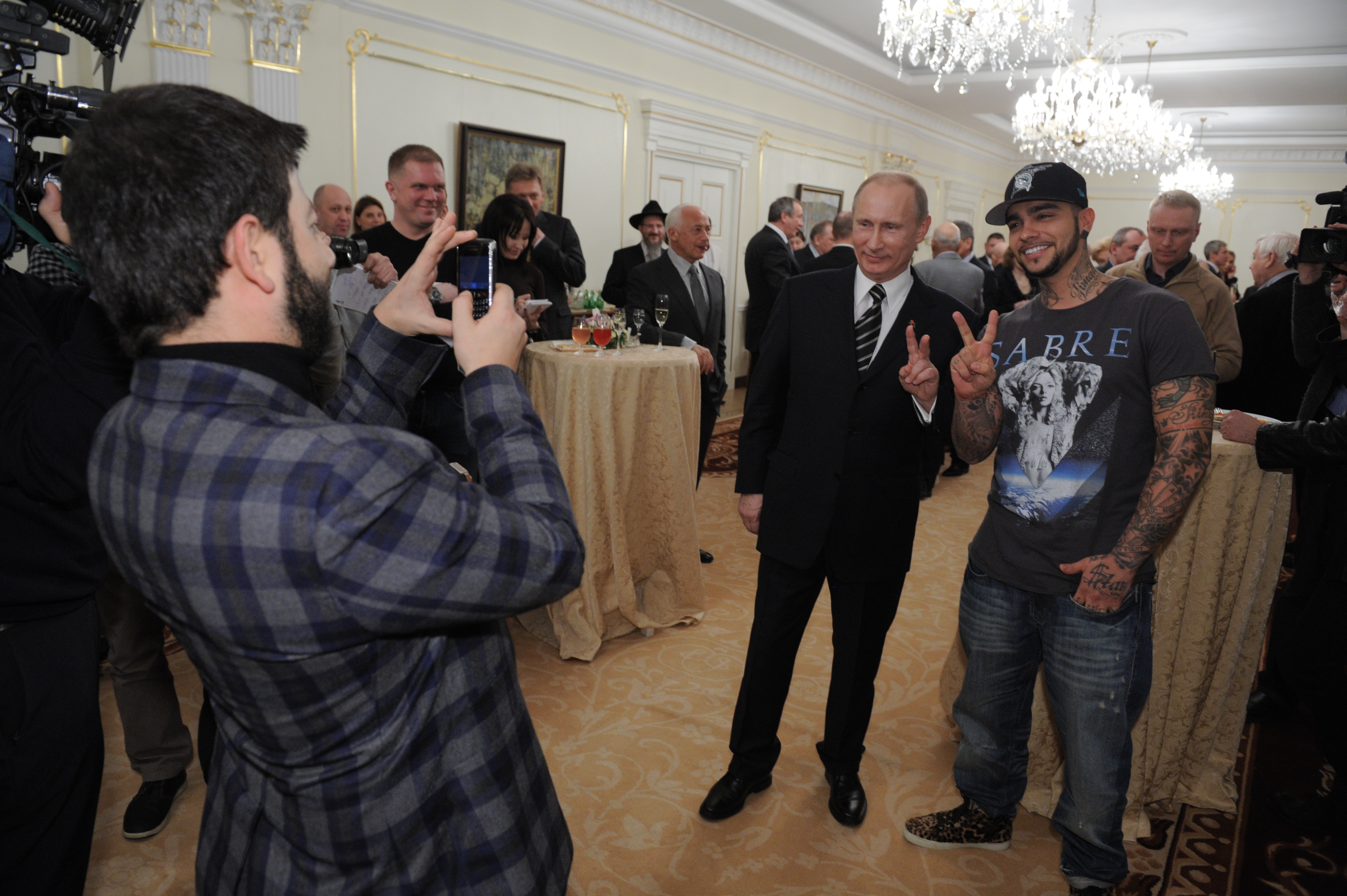
Timati and Vladimir Putin

He became well known to the Russian community from the music reality show Star Factory 4, but before it he collaborated with Detsl. Member of the group Banda (Russian: Банда; lit. "Gang") and co-founder of VIP 77. Former owner of B-Club nightclub, the bar Black October and the stores Ё-Life. He is the CEO of his label called "Black Star Inc". In 2006, was featured in Heat produced by Fyodor Bondarchuk. In 2008, Timati was featured in a Fat Joe song called "Put U Take It", also featuring German rapper Nox and Raul, produced by Scott Storch, referencing Jacob Arabo. In 2008 Mario Winans featured Timati in the single "Forever". In the same year, Timati appeared in the comedy film Hitler goes Kaput!. Timati, in 2009, featured Snoop Dogg in the single "Groove On".

Michael 'Mike' David is currently Timati's UK producer. He is responsible for Timati's collaborations with foreign artists, such as Snoop Dogg, Busta Rhymes, and Mario Winans, and much of Timati's popularity in the Western world.

In summer 2011, he topped the charts in Luxembourg, Poland, and Romania with the single "Welcome to St. Tropez" vs. DJ Antoine and feat. Kalenna Harper from Diddy – Dirty Money, shortly after being nominated for the best clip in Russia's Capital Moscow with "I'm on You" feat. P Diddy. The clip was created by Timati's old friend and partner, Pavel Hoodyakov, in the U.S.

In 2016, Timati gave his biggest solo performance in the Olympic Stadium in Moscow. The concert was attended by 15,000 people and featured a 3D installation, a car on stage and other spectacular show elements.

On the night of 21 June 2018 Timati and Egor Kreed held an unauthorized mass event in Moscow on Bolshaya Dmitrovka by staging an impromptu performance right on the roof of a car, which caused a major traffic jam on the street. This action was devoted to the opening of Timati's beauty salon. The next day, lawyer Alexander Khaminsky filed an application to initiate a case on this incident in the Department of the Ministry of Internal Affairs of Tver and the Moscow State Traffic Safety Inspectorate. The court was appointed on 1 August 2018.

In 2021, Timati's music video ''Scandal'' featuring Hanza and Oweek received a nomination at the Berlin Music Video Awards for Best Visual Effects. The VFX company behind the music video is HoodyFX.

=== Friendship with Ramzan Kadyrov ===
Timati calls the Chechen president Ramzan Kadyrov a friend and brother. In 2017, Timati shared an Instagram post of himself posing in Kadyrov's private jet. When anti-corruption activists highlighted this, Timati removed the Instagram post.

=== Support for Vladimir Putin ===
He participated in a political video to support Vladimir Putin during the 2012 Russian presidential election. During the 2018 Russian presidential election, he endorsed and was an official supporter of Vladimir Putin.

During the repression of candidates for the election of the Moscow State Duma, police brutality was used to hold back protestors and Timati collaborated with another rapper "Guf" to make "Москва" (Moscow), a song including the chorus "my best friend is President Putin", dissing the protesters and Russian opposition movement while praising the mayor of Moscow, the Kremlin, and Vladimir Putin and the video amassed 1.48 million dislikes on YouTube, the highest amount for a Russian video on YouTube before Russian rapper MORGENSHTERN broke the record for a music video for song "Pososi". Later, Timati deleted the "Moscow" video due to a "wave of negativity".

On 18 March 2022, Timati sang at Vladimir Putin's Moscow rally, celebrating the annexation of Crimea by the Russian Federation from Ukraine and justifying the 2022 Russian invasion of Ukraine.

=== AliExpress Scandal ===
On Timati's merchandise store, Black Star Wear, Timati collaborated with the Russian Army with military-style clothes but users found nearly identical clothing being sold on Chinese online marketplace AliExpress being rebranded and price gouged on Black Star Wear. Similarly, the wireless earphones also sold on Black Star Wear that were branded as "unique" also were traced back to near identical AliExpress counterparts. Timati then did a brand deal with AliExpress, making a short rap video promoting AliExpress, praising AliExpress for delivery speed and good deals on the website.

== Books ==
- 2008 – "The Moor" – producer books
- 2009 – "Audio of Audi. History of the brand" – Executive audiobooks
- 2010 – "Tatar folk tales" – Executive audiobooks
- 2012 – "A boy of twelve. Tatar folk tale" – Executive audiobooks
- 2012 − "A white serpent. Tatar folk tales" − Executive audiobooks
- 2012 − "Kamyr-Batyr. Tatar folk tales" − Executive audiobooks

== Business ==
Timati has several successful businesses including:

- "Black Star Wear" - clothing line.
- "Black Star Burger" - restaurant opened in 2016 in Moscow, it later became a franchise with several locations such as Los Angeles and Chelyabinsk. The burger restaurant is popular among the youths in Russia.
- "13 by Black Star" - barber shop and a tattoo shop in Moscow.
- "Stars Coffee", taking over the former Starbucks coffees in Russia after the company withdrew due to the Russian invasion of Ukraine.

== Concert tours ==
- 2009–2010 – The Boss Tour
- 2011 – Carrera Tour 2011 [30]
- 2015 – GTO (with L'One)
- 2016 – Olimp tour

== Discography ==
=== Studio albums ===
- Black Star (2006)
- The Boss (2009)
- SWAGG (2012)
- 13 (2013)
- RELOAD (2013)
- Audiokapsula (2014)
- G.T.O. (With L'One) (2015)
- Olimp (2016)
- Tranzit (2020)
- Шипы и Розы (2021)
- Banger Mixtape (2021)

=== Collaboration albums ===
- Noviye Lyudi (New People) (2004) – with Banda
- The Album (2006) – with VIP77

=== Singles ===
==== As lead artist ====
List of singles as lead artist, with selected chart positions and certifications, showing year released and album name
Title	Year	Peak chart positions							Certifications	Album
Title	Year	AUT	BEL	FRA	GER	NED	SPA	SWI	Certifications	Album
"Groove On" (featuring Snoop Dogg)	2009	–	21	–	62	88	—	—		The Boss
"Welcome to St. Tropez" (featuring Blue Marine)	2010	–	–	–	–	–	–	45		The Boss
"Welcome to St. Tropez" (DJ Antoine vs. Timati featuring Kalenna)	2011	4	9	7	3	7	16	2	IFPI SWI: 3× Platinum; BVMI: 3× Gold	2011
"I'm on You" (featuring P. Diddy, Dirty Money and DJ Antoine)	2012	–	–	–	50	–	–	62		SWAGG
"Not All About The Money" (with La La Land featuring Timbaland and Grooya)	2012	32	–	–	29	–	–	7		SWAGG
"Sex in the Bathroom" (featuring Craig David)	2012	–	—	—	—	—	—	—		SWAGG
"London" (with DJ Antoine featuring Grigory Leps)	2016	–	–	–	–	–	–	–		
"El Problemá" (with Morgenshtern)	2020	–	–	–	–	–	–	–		

Others

- Forever
- Love You
- Money in the Bank
- Top of the World
- Not All About The Money
- Gucci (feat. Egor Kreed)
- Khavchik (feat. GeeGun & Danya Milokhin)
- Rolls Royce (feat. GeeGun & Egor Kreed)

==== As featured artist ====
List of singles as featured artist, with selected chart positions and certifications, showing year released and album name
Title	Year	Peak chart positions		Album
Title	Year	UK	US	Album
"Lazerboy" (Sergey Lazarev featuring Timati)	2008	–	—	Electric Touch
"Фокусы" (DJ Smash featuring Timati)	2011	–	—	Twenty Three
"Moscow to California" (DJ M.E.G. featuring Sergey Lazarev and Timati)	2012	–	—	Lazarev.
"8 Days a Week" (Jean-Roch featuring Timati)	2012	–	—	Music Saved My Life
"—" denotes a recording that did not chart or was not released in that territory.

== Awards ==
=== Berlin Music Video Awards ===
- Best Visual Effect ''Scandal'' - 2021 (nominated)

=== MTV Russian Music Awards ===
- Best Hip-Hop Artist – 2007 (nominated)
- Best Hip-Hop Artist – 2008 (nominated)
- Best Artist – 2008 (nominated)
- Best Male Act – 2008 (nominated)

=== MUZ-TV Awards ===
- Best Hip-Hop Artist – 2009 (nominated)
- Best Hip-Hop Artist – 2010 (won)
- Best Album "The Boss" – 2010 (won)
- Best Video "Love You" – 2010 (won)
- Best Video "I'm on You" – 2011 (won)

=== MTV Europe Music Awards ===
- Best Russian Act – 2009 (nominated)
- Best Russian Act – 2010 (nominated)
- Best Russian Act – 2011 (nominated)

=== Golden Gramophone Award ===
- Award winner for the "I love you..." song – 2008
- Award winner for the "Moscow Never Sleeps..." song − 2009
- Award winner for the "London" song (together with Grigory Leps) − 2013

=== Night Life Awards ===
- Best club hit – 2003
- Best club figure of the year − 2007

=== World Fashion Awards ===
- Best R'n'B artist – 2007
- Fashion R'n'B project − 2008

=== Other awards ===
- 2008 − MTV RMA Award (Best club project for the Black Star Club)
- 2009 − In Da Awards (Best album according to Indarnb.ru)
- 2010 − Love Radio Awards (Best artist according to Love Radio)
- 2010 − "Trud" newspaper award - (Best-looking man)
- 2014 − World Music Awards (Best Russian Artist and Best RnB Artist of Russia)

=== Other achievements ===
His 2019 pro-Kremlin and anti-gay music video "Moscow" became the most disliked Russian video on YouTube, with 1.48 million dislikes before it was removed from YouTube.

During the 2022 Russian invasion of Ukraine, he argued in favor of the Russian attack.

== Filmography ==
- 2004 − Countdown
- 2006 − Heat
- 2008 − Albania!
- 2008 − Monday Twist
- 2008 − Daddy's Daughters
- 2008 − Hitler Goes Kaput!
- 2009 − Little Red Riding Hood
- 2010 − How the Cossacks...
- 2012 − My path to success (a videoseminar)
- 2013 − Odnoklassniki.ru
- 2014 - Capsule
- 2015 − Zero
- 2016 − Russian Hip Hop Beef
- 2019 − Hot!
- 2019 − Mafia
- 2020 − Mafia 2

Translation dubbing:

- 2006 − Arthur and the Invisibles
- 2007 − Surf's Up
- 2009 − District 13: Ultimatum
- 2009 − Arthur and the Revenge of Maltazard
- 2014 − Brick Mansions

== Personal life ==
Timati was in a relationship with Alexa – his colleague from the “Fabrika Zvyozd” – a popular Russian television talent show. The pair split up in 2007.

He was also in a relationship with model Alena Shishkova. They share a daughter named Alisa (born 19 March 2014).

Since 2015, Timati has been dating Russian model Anastasia Reshetova. On 16 October 2019 the couple had a son, named Ratmir.

In 2025, he became a father for the third time. His current girlfriend, Valentina Ivanova, gave birth to a daughter, Emma.

== See also ==
- MD&C Pavlov
