= 13th Rifle Division =

13th Rifle Division can refer to:

- 13th Guards Rifle Division
- 13th Motor Rifle Division NKVD
- 13th Rifle Division (Soviet Union)

== See also ==
- 13th Division (disambiguation)
