= Ilya Vlasenko =

Soviet Major General

- Vlasenko in 1940
- Born: Ilya Arkhipovich Vlasenko; 19 July 1902; Dobrush, Gomel Region, Russian Empire
- Died: 11 May 1963 (aged 60); Kyiv, Ukrainian SSR, Soviet Union
- Military career
- Allegiance: Soviet Union
- Service years: 1932–1957
- Rank: Major general
- Conflicts: World War II; Battle of Moscow; Second Battle of Kharkov; Battle of Stalingrad; Battle of Kursk; Battle of the Dnieper; Operation Bagration; Vistula–Oder Offensive; Battle of Berlin
- Awards: Hero of the Soviet Union; Order of Lenin
- Other work: Political Head of the Military District

Ilya Arkhipovich Vlasenko (19 July 1902 – 11 May 1963) (Ukrainian: Ілля Архипович Власенко, Belarusian: Ілья Архіпавіч Уласенка, Russian: Илья Архипович Власенко) was a political commissar in the Red Army during and following World War II. Vlasenko was awarded the title Hero of the Soviet Union in 1943 for his leadership in the Battle of the Dnieper.

== Pre-war ==
Vlasenko was born on 19 July 1902 in the town of Dobrush (now part of the Gomel Region in Belarus). His father was a worker at the city's paper mill. Vlasenko graduated from the city's two year primary school. In 1917, he began working at the paper mill. Between 1924 and 1926, Vlasenko served in the Red Army as a soldier with the 2nd Radio Regiment at Bryansk. After demobilization, Vlasenko became a trade union leader at the Dobrush paper mill. He was elected to the Central Committee of the Trade Union of Paper Industry Workers. In 1929, he became head of the trade union's personnel department in Moscow. In 1931, Vlasenko became the director of the Krasnaya Zvezda paper mill in Chashniki. He then became head of the quality control department in the 7th Anniversary of the October Revolution Factory in Moscow. He was elected a deputy of the Moscow Soviet of People's Deputies.

In May 1932, by the decision of the Communist Party he was mobilized and sent to strengthen the Party and political work in the troops of the NKVD. He served in the Tula region and graduated from the KomVUZ and the Higher School of Border Troops.

== Second World War ==
On 24 June 1941 according to the mobilization plan Battalion Commissar Vlasenko forms together with Lieutenant-Colonel Safiulin 69th Brigade NKVD in the city of Tula and becomes a military commissar of the brigade. 69th Brigade as part of the 50th Army actively participates in the Tula defense operation (the part of Battle of Moscow), reflecting the onset of the 2nd Panzer Army under command of Guderian, who later wrote: "An attempt to capture the city at once stumbled on a strong anti-tank and anti-aircraft defenses and ended in failure, and we have suffered significant losses in tanks and officers". For his personal bravery, courage and leadership in combat Vlasenko awarded the Order of the Red Banner and the title of "Senior Battalion Commissar".

He was appointed a military commissar of the 8th Motor Rifle Division NKVD and then of the 13th Motor Rifle Division NKVD, and participated in the Second Battle of Kharkov, was fighting in the region of Izium, Kupiansk, Voronezh, Borisoglebsk.

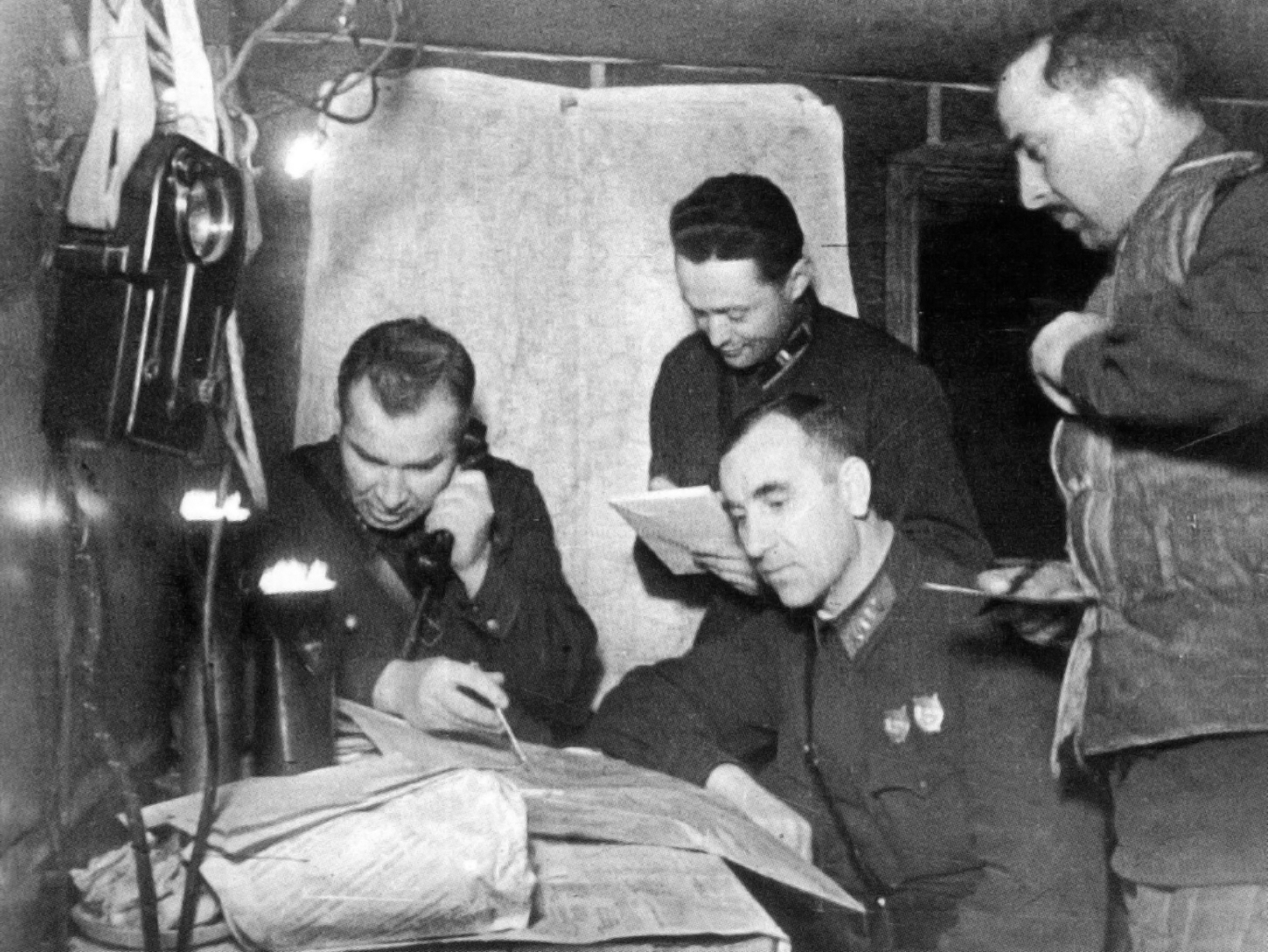
The command post of the 95th Rifle Division in Stalingrad. From left to right: division commander Col. V. Gorishnii, military commissar of the division Col. I. Vlasenko (sitting), Maj. G. Slutsky, chief of division artillery Col. A. Dalakishvili. 1942

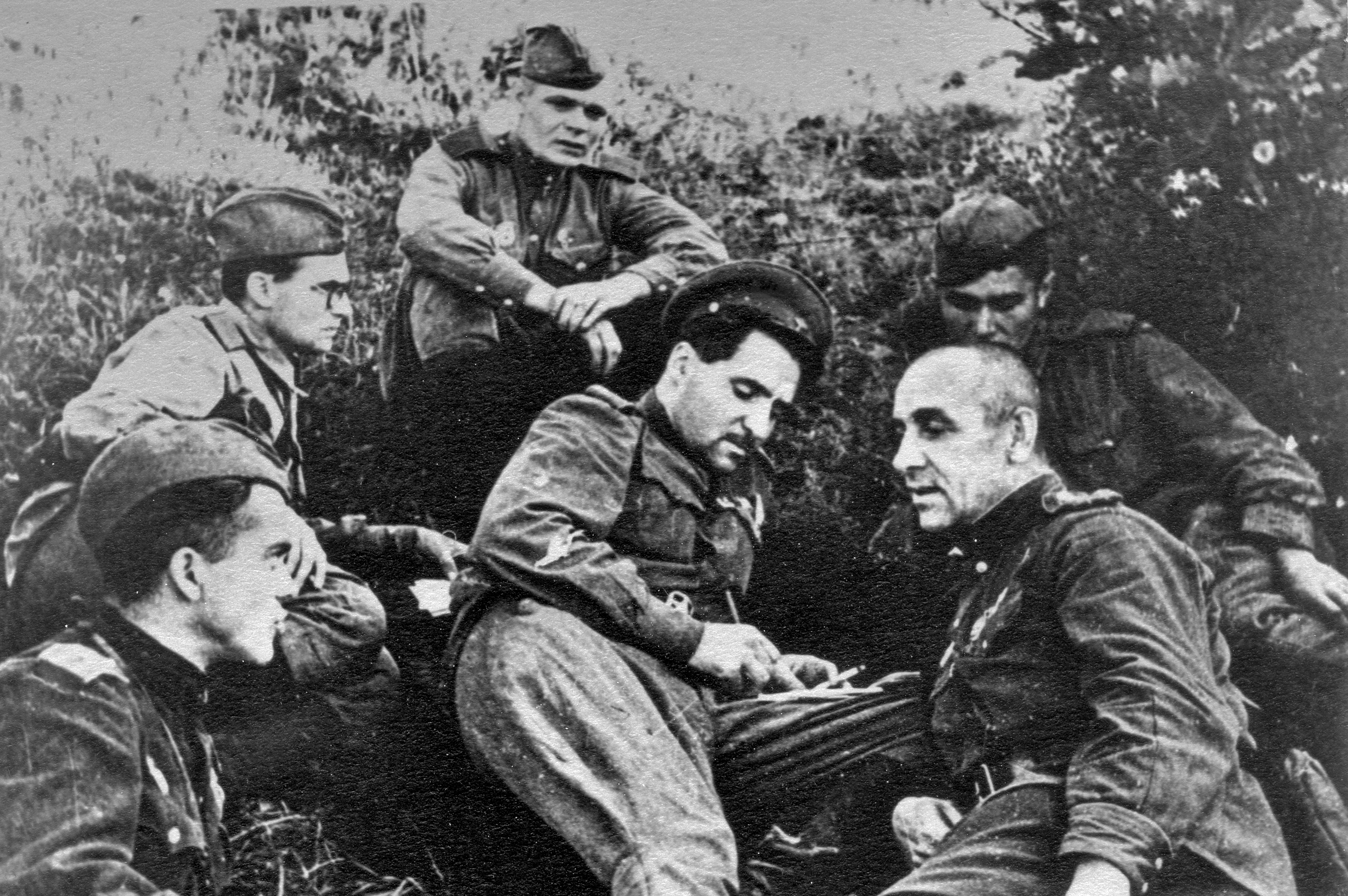
Konstantin Simonov (in center) and Ilya Vlasenko (right) at the command post of the 75th Guards Rifle Division near Ponyri. Battle of Kursk. 1943

After significant losses in the battle, June 15, 1942, the 13th Motorized Rifle Division NKVD was reorganized, incorporated into the Red Army and was named the 95th Rifle Division. In September 1942 the division arrived in Stalingrad. It defended the Mamayev Kurgan, the Krasny Oktyabr factory, Stalingrad Tractor Plant. For the defense of Stalingrad, the 95th Rifle Division was awarded the title of Guards, March 1, 1943, it transformed into the 75th Guards Rifle Division. For his courage, determination and leadership in the battle Colonel Vlasenko awarded a second Order of the Red Banner.

In July 1943, the Division as part of the 13th Army participated in the Battle of Kursk near the Ponyri – Olhovatka. In the heavy fighting the offensive of German troops, who used a large number of tanks, was halted with heavy losses to the enemy. For exemplary performance of combat tasks and for displaying courage and heroism the Division was awarded the Order of the Red Banner, and Colonel Vlasenko awarded the Order of the Red Star.

August 27, 1943, the Division entered the territory of Ukraine. In the battles for the liberation of Ukraine and Battle of the Dnieper the Division liberates station Khutor-Mikhailovsky, townships Yampil, Baturyn and September 9 town Bakhmach. For the heroism shown during the liberation of the city Bakhmach, the division is assigned the name "Bakhmach". September 21 the Division forces the Desna River, and September 23 Division boosts the Dnieper River, 35 km north of Kyiv, near the village Yasnogorodka (Vyshhorod Raion). The capture and expansion of the bridgehead made it possible to concentrate the troops for an attack on Kyiv and the liberation of the Ukrainian capital. Guard Colonel Vlasenko for his courage and heroism was awarded the title of Hero of the Soviet Union.

He participates in the further liberation of Ukraine, then Belarus (Operation Bagration) and was awarded the third Order of the Red Banner. In June 1944, Vlasenko was appointed head of the political department of the 61st Rifle Corps of the 69th Army of the 1st Belorussian Front.

During the Lublin–Brest offensive 61 Corps July 20, 1944, crossed the Bug River, and July 29 crossed the Vistula near the town of Puławy and captured the bridgehead. January 15, 1945, the Corps, acting in the Vistula–Oder offensive, freed the city of Radom and was awarded the honorary name "Radom." Continuing the offensive, the Corps forcing the rivers Pilica and Warta, freed the city Tomaszow and Jarocin and came to the Oder to the north of the city of Frankfurt (Oder). For his heroism and bravery, the skill to lead troops in combat Guard Colonel Vlasenko was awarded the Order of Kutuzov 2nd Class.

In April 1945, the Corps participated in the Battle of Berlin, doing offensive from the Kyustrin's bridgehead. In the Battle of the Seelow Heights the Corps gave not retreat 9th Army (Wehrmacht) to Berlin, then it participated in the elimination of the enemy force, which was surrounded by the south-east of Berlin. For a breakthrough fortified enemy band and skilful political leadership of the offensive operations Colonel Vlasenko was awarded the Order of Bogdan Khmelnitsky (Soviet Union) 2nd Class.

May 1, 1945, Guards Colonel Ilya Vlasenko graduated part in the hostilities of World War II when the 61st Radom Rifle Corps came out on the river Elbe near the city of Magdeburg and met with US troops.

== Post-war ==
In July 1945, Vlasenko was appointed head of the Political Department and Deputy Chief for Political Affairs for the Soviet Military Administration in Germany in Mecklenburg province and he served in that position until the German Democratic Republic was established in 1949. For his work in Germany, he was awarded the Order of the Red Banner of Labour.

Between 1950 and 1951 Vlasenko studied at the Lenin Military-Political Academy. From April 1951 he was the Deputy Head of the Political Administration of the South Ural Military District, and from October 1953 to 3 October 1957 Vlasenko was Head of the Political Administration of the District. He was promoted to the rank of "Major-General" in 1954. Vlasenko was awarded the Order of the Red Banner in 1950 and the Order of Lenin in 1956.

Vlasenko retired in 1957. He lived in Kyiv, died on May 11, 1963, and was buried in Kyiv Lukyanovka military cemetery next to his wife Valentina Vlasenko (Subbocheva). The couple tied their fate during the battles in Stalingrad.

== Awards ==
- "Gold Star" Medal Hero of the Soviet Union, № 1551 (1943)
- Two Orders of Lenin, № 15872 (1943); № 323959 (1956)
- Orders of the Red Banner, three times № 36663 (1942); № 1974 (1942); № 6676 (1950)
- Order of Kutuzov, 2nd class, № 1151 (1944)
- Order of Bogdan Khmelnitsky, 2nd class, № 1022 (1945)
- Order of the Red Banner of Labour, № 61618 (1948)
- Two Orders of the Red Star, № 252484 (1943); 1272563 (1945)
- Medal "For Battle Merit", №1504878
- Medal "For the Defence of Moscow"
- Medal "For the Defence of Stalingrad"
- Medal "For the Victory over Germany in the Great Patriotic War 1941–1945"
- Medal "For the Capture of Berlin"
- Medal "For the Liberation of Warsaw"
- Medal "In Commemoration of the 800th Anniversary of Moscow"
- Jubilee Medal "30 Years of the Soviet Army and Navy"
- Bronze medal Meritorious on the Field of Glory (Poland)
- Medal Medal for the Oder, Neisse, Baltic (Poland)

== Honors ==
- A street in Dobrush was named for Vlasenko.
- A stele with Vlasenko's name was erected in Dobrush's Second World War memorial.
- A memorial plaque is located on house number 4 on Lavra St. in Kyiv, where Vlasenko lived in his last years (abducted by unknown persons in September 2022).
- There is a monument to Vlasenko at the Lukyanovka military cemetery in Kyiv.

== Bibliography ==
- (in Russian) «Dnipro – the river of heroes» – 2nd ed., Ext. – Kyiv: Political lit. Publ. of Ukraine, 1988 – ISBN 5-319-00085-5.
- Jones, Michael K. (2010). Stalingrad: How the Red Army Triumphed. UK: Pen & Sword Books. ISBN 978-1-84884-201-4.
- (in Russian) Memoirs by Vasili Chuikov: Сражение века Battle of the Century.
- (in Russian) Diaries of Konstantin Simonov: Разные дни войны Various days of the war.
- (in Russian) О войне и товарищах. Сборник воспоминаний. — Красноград: АО «КМП», 1996. — 208 с. с илл. — 950 экз. About the War and Comrades. Collection of the veterans memories.
