= Coat of arms of Izium =

Symbol of Izium

Coat of Arms of Izium
- Armiger: Mayor of Izium
- Adopted: 2024
- Supporter: None
- Use: City flag, official correspondence, insignia of city agencies and institutions

The coat of arms of Izium is a symbol of Izium, a city in Kharkiv Oblast, Ukraine. The current coat of arms was adopted in 2024 following a contest. It author is Alisa Tirayan, a 19-year old native of Kharkiv.

== Previous versions ==
The first project of the coat of arms was suggested in 1863 which had the following description: "There are three green bunches of grapes on the surface of the golden shield: two of them are at the top and one is at the bottom. The shield is decorated with the silver three-tormented crown and encircled with golden wheat stalks linked with Alexander's banner". The project of 1863 was not approved then, but in 2001 the City Hall took the project as a base for the city's coat of arms adopting it on September 25, 2001. In June 2024 a contest for a new coat of arms was announced by the local administration, as the previous arms was considered to be part of Russian imperial legacy.

== Gallery ==
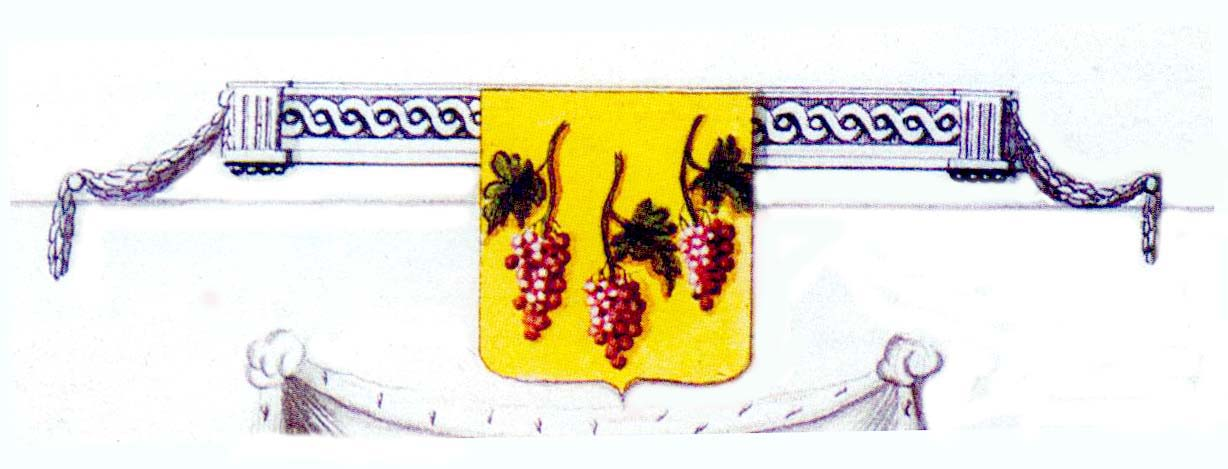
Depiction on a map from 1787

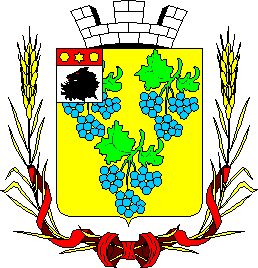
Project by Berhnard Karl von Koehne

The city's previous coat of arms from 2001

Historical flag of Izium
