= 95th Rifle Division =

95th Rifle Division 1st Formation – November 1923 – 30 July 1942 2nd Formation – 2 Aug 1942 – 1 Mar 1943 3rd Formation – Order of the Red Banner, Order of Suvorov (2nd class), honorary name "Verkhnedneprovsk" 1 Mar 1943 – 1945
- Active: Formed three times: November 1923, 2 August 1942, 1 March 1943
- Country: Soviet Union
- Branch: Red Army
- Type: Infantry
- Size: over 12,000 (Second World War)
- Engagements: Winter War of 1939–1940; Soviet occupation of Bessarabia and Northern Bukovina of 1940 World War II: Defence of Odessa; Defence of Sevastopol; Battle of Stalingrad; Operation Bagration
- Battle honours: Order of the Red Banner, Order of Suvorov (2nd class), honorary name "Verkhnedneprovsk" (Third formation)

Commanders
- Notable commanders: Colonel Alexander Grigoryevich Kapitokhin (First formation); Colonel Vasilii Akimovich Gorishny (Second formation)

The 95th Rifle Division (Russian: 95-я стрелковая дивизия 95-y strelkovaya diviziya) was a Red Army Rifle Division during World War II, formed three times. The division was first formed in November 1923 with the 6th Rifle Corps. It fought in the Winter War and the Soviet occupation of Bessarabia and Northern Bukovina. After Operation Barbarossa, the division fought in the retreat from Moldova and fought in the siege of Odessa and the siege of Sevastopol. It was destroyed during the siege of Sevastopol and was disbanded in late July 1942. The division was reformed in August 1942 from the 13th Motor Rifle Division NKVD and fought at the Battle of Stalingrad. For its actions during the battle, the division became the 75th Guards Rifle Division in March 1943. In April 1943, the division was formed a third time at Kaluga from the 121st Rifle Brigade. It fought in Operation Bagration.

== First formation ==
The first time the 95th Rifle Division was formed in the 6th Rifle Corps of the Ukrainian Military District during November 1923. It participated in the Winter War of 1939–1940 and in the Soviet occupation of Bessarabia and Northern Bukovina of 1940. With the beginning of World War II it became part of the Separate Coastal Army, defence of Odessa and defence of Sevastopol. The 95th Infantry Division (1st formation) was completely destroyed in the fighting and disbanded July 30, 1942.

=== Composition ===
The First Formation of the 95th Rifle Division included the following units:

- 90th Rifle Regiment
- 161st Rifle Regiment
- 241st Rifle Regiment
- 57th Artillery Regiment
- 134th Howitzer Artillery Regiment
- 97th Separate Antitank Battalion
- 194th Anti-aircraft Battery (175th Separate Anti-aircraft Artillery Battalion)
- 13th Reconnaissance Company
- 48th Separate Sapper Battalion
- 91st Separate Communications Battalion
- 103rd Medical Battalion
- 30th Separate Chemical Defence Company
- 46th (283rd) Trucking Company
- 174th (47th) Field Bakery
- 7th Divisional Veterinary Hospital
- 321st Mobile Car Repair Workshop
- 126th Divisional Artillery Repair Workshop
- 163rd Field Post Office
- 348th Field Ticket Office of the State Bank

=== Division commanders ===
- Major General Pastrevich A.I. (17-01-1941 – 15–07–1941)
- Major General Vorobyov V.F. (10-08-1941 – 29–12–1941)
- Colonel Kapitohin A.G. (01-01-1942 – 17–07–1942)

== Second formation ==
The 95th Rifle Division (2nd formation) was established on the basis of the 13th Motor Rifle Division NKVD, which by the order of the NKVD № 001 547 from 07.28.1942 was transferred to the Red Army and in accordance with the directive of the General Staff of the Red Army (org / 2/2172 from 02.08.1942) was reformed in the 95th Rifle Division. The 4th Motorized Rifle Regiment of the NKVD became the 90th Rifle Regiment, 266th Rifle Regiment – 161st Rifle Regiment, 274th Rifle Regiment – 241st Rifle Regiment.

On September 2, 1942, the division in the number of 10,600 men and officers were directed to the Western Front and arrived at the station Mozhaysk but then received another order to follow in the disposal of the 62nd Army in Stalingrad. In the evening on September 17 trains came to the stations Leninsk and Zaplavnoe (Medial Akhtuba). Having made a 40-km march, the division came to the left bank of the Volga in front of Stalingrad, to the ferriage of the 62nd Army. On the night of September 18, the 90th and 161st Rifle Regiment, 97th separate antitank battalion, 96th engineer battalion and division headquarters crossed over into Stalingrad. The division received an order to drive out the enemy from Height 102.0 (Mamayev Kurgan) by using the available forces, and they engaged in the battle and captured the top of the hill, but could not advance further due to the big losses under heavy artillery and mortar fire. The rest of the division crossed the Volga late because the crossing was subjected to constant blows of the enemy and was only possible at night. During September 19–27 the division continued with bloody battles against superior enemy forces, supported by tanks and aircraft, but in spite of heavy losses, held the Mamayev Kurgan. According to a report by the formation's headquarters, from 19 through 25 September the division's units lost 5,186 men in killed and wounded. On September 27 alone, the division suffered 4,000 casualties and was nearly decimated. Division headquarters was located in the Banny ravine at the foot of Mamayev Kurgan. On 28 September due to the deterioration of the situation near the "Red October" factory, the division was ordered to give the defense of Mamayev Kurgan to the 284th Rifle Division of Colonel Batiouk N.F. and defend the factory and working settlement.

In October, together with the 37th Guards Rifle Division of Major-General Zholudev V.G., the division defended the Tractor Plant. On 14 October the Germans launched a powerful offensive with all that they possessed, but the division maintained its position, thus bearing huge losses—15 October losses amounted to about 75 percent of combat composition. On 17 October the division remains were consolidated into one – 161st Rifle Regiment. Division headquarters and the headquarters of the two other Regiments were sent to the left bank of the Volga for replenishment. During the period of September 19-October 17, the division was reduced from three regiments totaling over 10,000 men to just one regiment composed of only 50 active combatants.

In early November, the division again kept the defense under the steep bank of the Volga, being pressed to the water. Neighbors on the right flank were the 138th Rifle Division of Colonel Lyudnikov I.I. and the 308th Rifle Division of Colonel Gurtiev L.N., and on the left – the 45th Rifle Division Colonel Sokolov V.P. and the 39th Guards Rifle Division, General-Major Guriev S.S.

On 11 November the enemy launched a massive attack on the division position by two infantry divisions, which were supported by tanks. The defense of the 241st Rifle Regiment was broken, and German troops reached the banks of the Volga in the width of 500 meters. The 62nd Army was divided at the junction of the 95th and 138th Rifle Divisions. Further enemy advance was halted, but at the cost of heavy losses. The counteroffensive of the Soviet troops (Operation Uranus) began on November 19, and the enemy was forced to reduce their activity of fighting in Stalingrad. When the 6th Army of Paulus was completely surrounded on November 23, the Germans had to go on the defensive. The division continued to battle, destroying enemy garrisons, which had a very strong resistance. On December 23 the division broke through the enemy positions and established direct contact with the 138th Rifle Division of Colonel Lyudnikov.

From December 29, the division was fighting for the Plant "Barricades". On the morning of February 2, after a short artillery bombardment, the enemy was attacked in the Tractor Plant and "Barricades" Plant area and the 95th Rifle Division, together with units of the 45th Rifle Division captured the Plant "Barricades". The northern group of enemy troops in the factory district of the city capitulated and the Battle of Stalingrad was over.

According to the Journal of Hostilities, as of February 1, 1943, the numbers of soldiers in the 95th Rifle Division were: 90th regiment – 20 men, 161st regiment – 85 men (including 22 fighters of mortar units), 241st regiment – 49 (including 22 fighters of mortar units). Veterans remembered that during the fighting in Stalingrad about 60,000 people passed through the division, but in an echelon which was transporting the division to re-forming, there were about 600 people. For excellent military operations to defeat the Nazi troops 398 men and officers of the 95th Rifle Division were awarded orders and medals.

On March 1, 1943, by the Order of the People's Commissariat of Defense of the USSR number 104 the 95th Rifle Division was reorganized into the 75th Guards Rifle Division.

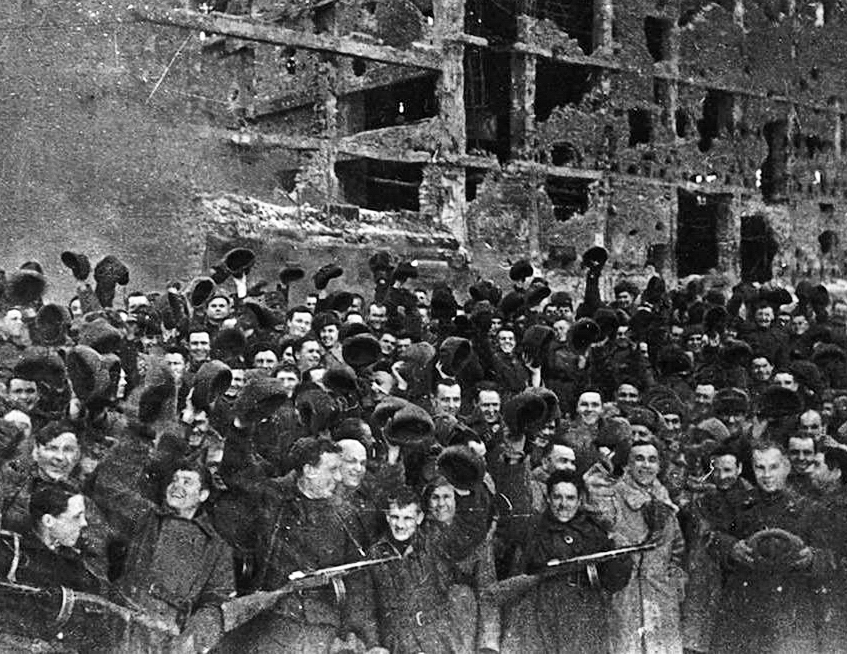
The fighters of the 95th Rifle Division on the day the Battle of Stalingrad ended. In the front row first from right Colonel Gorishnii, second (in a white sheepskin coat) – Colonel Vlasenko.

External image
- The memorial stela on the common grave of officers and men of the 95th Rifle Division in Stalingrad

=== Composition ===
The Second Formation of the 95th Rifle Division included the following units:

- 90th Rifle Regiment
- 161st Rifle Regiment
- 241st Rifle Regiment
- 57th Artillery Regiment
- 97th Separate Antitank Battalion
- 13th Reconnaissance Company
- 48th Separate Sapper Battalion
- 119th Separate Communications Company
- 103rd Medical Battalion
- 30th Separate Chemical Defence Company
- 283rd Trucking Company
- 174th Field Bakery
- 7th Divisional Veterinary Hospital
- 1766th (2054th) Field Post Office
- 1723rd (652nd) Field Ticket Office of the State Bank

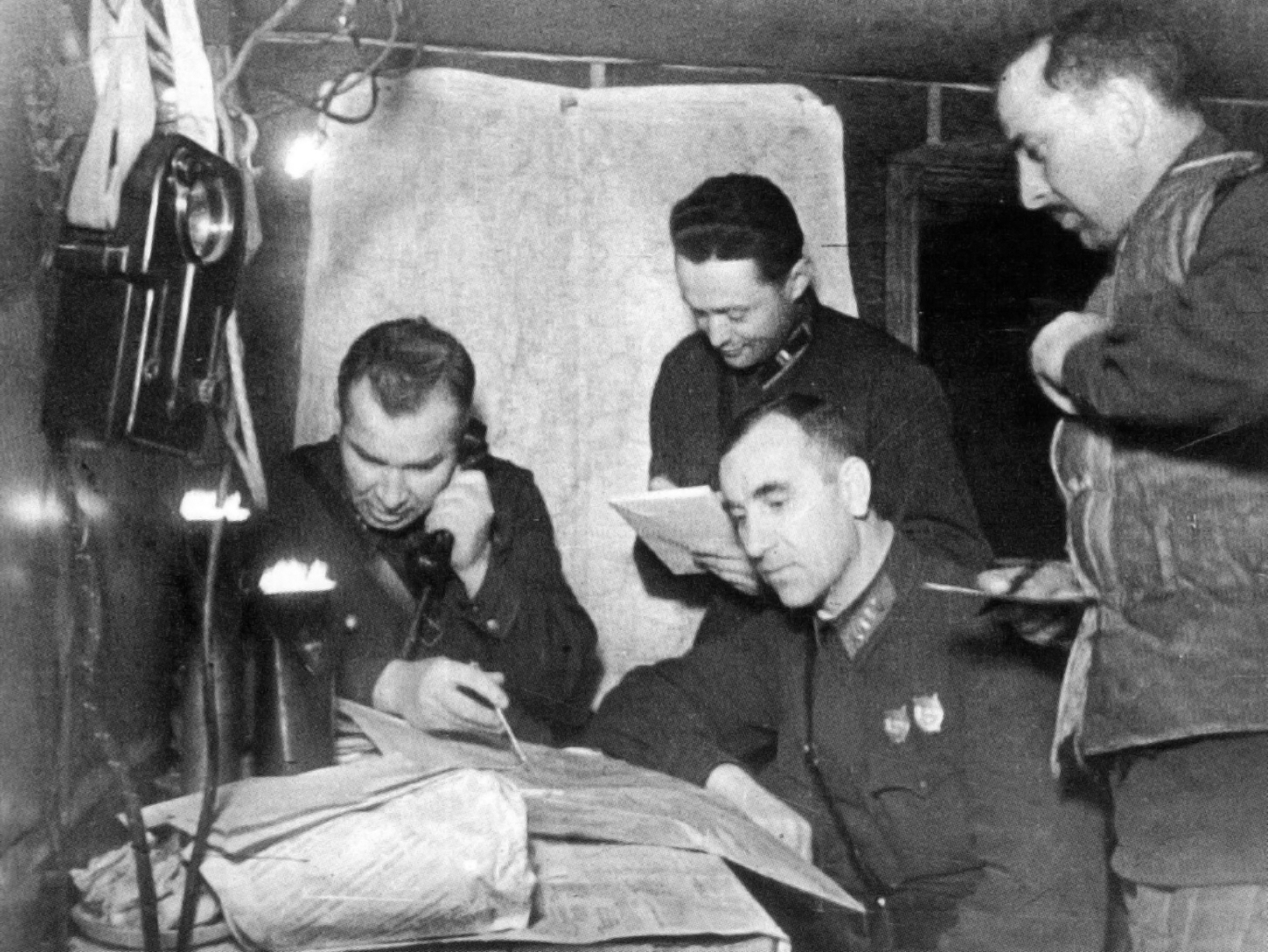
The command post of the 95th Rifle Division in Stalingrad. From left to right: the Division commander, Col. Gorishnii V.A., military commissar of Division Col. Vlasenko I.A. (sitting), Head of the 1st Dep. Maj. Slutsky G.G., the Head of Division artillery, Lt. Col. Dalakishvili A.A. 1942

=== Commanders ===
- The division commander, Colonel Gorishnii V.A.
- The military commissar of the division, Colonel Vlasenko I.A.
- Head of division artillery, Lieutenant Colonel Dalakishvili A.A.
- The commander of the 90th Rifle Regiment, Lieutenant Colonel Borisov M.S.
- The commander of the 161st Rifle Regiment, Lieutenant Colonel Rudnev I.V. (KIA September 19, 1942, on Mamayev Kurgan); Major Makovetskii F.E.
- The commander of the 241st Rifle Regiment, Major Selimov.
- The commander of the 57th Artillery Regiment, Lieutenant Colonel Levkin N.A.

== Third formation ==
The 95th Rifle Division (3rd formation) was created in Kaluga 15 April 1943 by the order of Headquarters of the command of the Supreme Commander № 46081 from 20.03.1943. Towards the end of World War II, the division was awarded the Order of the Red Banner, the Order of Suvorov (2nd class) and the honorary name of "Verkhnedneprovsk".

=== Composition ===
The Third Formation of the 95th Rifle Division included the following units:

- 90th Rifle Regiment
- 161st Rifle Regiment
- 241st Rifle Regiment
- 57th Artillery Regiment
- 97th Separate Antitank Battalion
- 13th Reconnaissance Company
- 48th Separate Sapper Battalion
- 119th Separate Communications Company
- 103rd Medical Battalion
- 30th Separate Chemical Defence Company
- 283rd Trucking Company
- 174th Field Bakery
- 7th Divisional Veterinary Hospital
- 1766th Field Post Office
- 1723rd Field Ticket Office of the State Bank

== Bibliography ==
- Jones, Michael K. (2010). Stalingrad: How the Red Army Triumphed. UK: Pen & Sword Books. ISBN 978-1-84884-201-4.
- (in Russian) Memoirs by Vasili Chuikov: Сражение века Battle of the Century.
- (in Russian) О войне и товарищах. Сборник воспоминаний. — Красноград: АО «КМП», 1996. — 208 с. с илл. — 950 экз. About the War and Comrades. Collection of the veterans memories.
