= Follow Me (2022 film) =

2022 Ukrainian documentary

- Directed by: Lubomir Levitski
- Produced by: Mykola Orekhovsky, Vitaliy Kolomiets, Dmytro Nykyforov (Executive Producer)
- Release date: 2022
- Running time: 30 minutes
- Country: Ukraine
- Languages: Ukrainian and English

Follow Me (Ukrainian: «Йди за мною», romanized: Yidy za mnoiu) is a 2022 documentary film directed by Lubomir Levitski about the shooting of Andrii Bohomaz.

== Production ==
Follow Me is the first documentary directed by Lubomir Levitski. Levitski was inspired to make the film by journalist Vasyl Krutchak, who contacted him after seeing drone footage filmed by Ukraine's 93rd Mechanized Brigade.

The documentary includes Arri Alexa filmed interviews, aerial footage from drones, communicated by Starlink satellite, and reconstructions of events.

The film was released in Ukrainian and English. The first trailers were released on October 21, 2022. The film was screened in Cyprus in February 2023.

== Synopsis ==
Follow Me is 30 minutes in length and documents the story of a married couple fleeing fighting in Kyiv, via Izyum by car. They are on a journey to collect the husband's parents from Izyum when they accidentally drive too close to the front lines. A Ukrainian military drone observes the subsequent attack on the couple's vehicle from the Russian Armed Forces. Ukrainian police then investigate the events.

== See also ==
- 20 Days in Mariupol
