= 69th Brigade NKVD =

69th Brigade of the NKVD troops for protection of especial importance industrial facilities 24 June 1941 – 31 January 1942
- Country: Soviet Union
- Branch: NKVD
- Type: Infantry
- Engagements: World War II: Tula defense operation (the part of Battle of Moscow)

Commanders
- Notable commanders: Colonel Alexander K. Melnikov

The 69th Brigade of the NKVD troops for protection of especial importance industrial facilities (Russian: 69-я бригада войск НКВД CCCP по охране особо важных предприятий промышленности 69-y brigada vnutrenikh voisk NKVD SSSR po okhrane osobo vaznykh predpriyatyi promyshlenosty) – the subdivision of internal troops NKVD in the subordination to the Main Directorate of the NKVD for protection of especial importance industrial facilities.

The brigade was formed June 24, 1941, in accordance with the mobilization plan in the city of Tula on the basis of the 11th Division of the NKVD troops to protect the defense plants in Tula and Tambov regions. The formation made Commander of the brigade Colonel Safiullin G.B. and Military Commissar of the brigade Battalion Commissar Vlasenko I.A. After a secondment Colonel Safiullin G.B. to the Acting army, 2 July Colonel Melnikov A.K. was appointed the brigade commander.

== Subordinate units ==
In July 1941 the division included:

- 180th Rifle Regiment stationed in Stalinogorsk, now the town Novomoskovsk, Tula Region
- 114th separate Rifle Battalion, which in August was deployed into the 156th Infantry Regiment, housed in Tula and was a guard of the Tula Arms Plant
- 76th separate Rifle Battalion stationed in the town Kotovsk, Tambov Region
- 115th separate Rifle Battalion stationed in the town Aleksin, Tula Region

== A fighting way ==
Due to the deep advancement of Guderian's 2nd Panzer Army, which began September 30, 1941, there was a real threat of capture of Tula. 69 Brigade was given to the 50th Army and participated in the defense of Tula, first as part of the Bryansk Front, and then the Western Front.

In the early days of the Tula defensive operation, 20 October – 2 November, Guderian's tanks and Panzer-Grenadier-Division Großdeutschland made continuous attacks in an attempt to capture Tula immediately. At this time, the city was protected by the parts of the 69th Brigade, which together with Tula Working Regiment, 732nd Anti-aircraft Artillery Regiment and some other force (formed from the dispersed after the retreat) were able to keep the defense until reinforcements. The main role in the reflection of the first German strike played the 156th Rifle Regiment, which battled on the southern outskirts of Tula, 115-th separate Rifle Battalion, which covered the retreat parts of the 49th Army to a new line of defense in the direction of Aleksin and the 180th Rifle Regiment, who defended Stalinogorsk.

November 10 by the order of the 50th Army Colonel Melnikov A.K. was appointed the Chief of the garrison city of Tula, Battalion Commissar Vlasenko I.A. – the Military Commissar of Tula, the Quartermaster of the 2nd rank Seleznev V.M. - the Commandant of Tula. The militia of city and the squads of workers were subordinated to the 69th Brigade. The Tula defense continued until 6 December 1941, when the Red Army passed to the counteroffensive.

For courage and heroism in the defense of Tula, more than fifty men and officers of the 69th Brigade of the NKVD were awarded orders and medals (by order of the Military Council of the Western Front number 411 of 19 December 1941). Colonel Melnikov A.K. and Battalion Commissar Vlasenko I.A. for the skilful organization of the heroic defense of Tula were awarded the Orders of the Red Banner (by the Decree of the Supreme Soviet of the USSR from April 12, 1942).

External image
- Soldiers with anti-tank gun at the crossroads in the center of Tula

External image
- The commanders of the 156th Rifle Regiment NKVD

January 31, 1942, by the orders of the NKVD number 00223 the 69th Brigade was renamed into the 2nd Brigade of the NKVD troops for protection of especial importance industrial facilities. Later, April 15, 1943, the 156th Rifle Regiment was awarded the honorary title of "Tula" (by order of the NKVD USSR No. 0144) and for the achievements during the defense of Tula by the Decree of the Supreme Soviet of the USSR from April 12, 1943, the regiment was awarded the Order of the Red Banner.

External image
- ru:Файл:Командир 69-й бригады войск НКВД полковник Мельников А.К..jpg Colonel Melnikov Aleksandr Konstantinovich

External image
- ru:Файл:Военный комиссар 69-й бригады войск НКВД батальонный комиссар Власенко И.А..jpg Battalion Commissar Vlasenko Ilya Arkhipovich

=== Commanders ===
- The Division commander, Colonel Gorishnii V.A.
- The military commissar of Division,
  Senior Battalion Commissar Vlasenko I.A.
