= Shooting of Andrii Bohomaz =

2022 shooting of a civilian in Ukraine

- Part of Russian invasion of Ukraine
- Location: 49°12′46″N 37°15′25″E; Izium, Kharkiv Oblast, Ukraine
- Date: June 2022
- Attack type: Military shooting of civilian

Andrii Bohomaz is a Ukrainian civilian who was shot by Russian Armed Forces in Izium, in the Kharkiv region of Ukraine, in June 2022, during the Russian invasion of Ukraine.

Bohomaz and his wife Valeria Ponomarova accidentally drove into Russian occupied territory. Their vehicle and Bohomaz were struck by gunfire, before Ponomarova was led to safety by a Ukrainian military drone.

Russian forces assumed Bohomaz to be dead, but he woke the next day and walked to safety.

Ukrainian police are pursuing a Russian commander for attempted murder. Filmmaker Lubomir Levitski directed the documentary Follow Me about the attack.

== Shooting ==
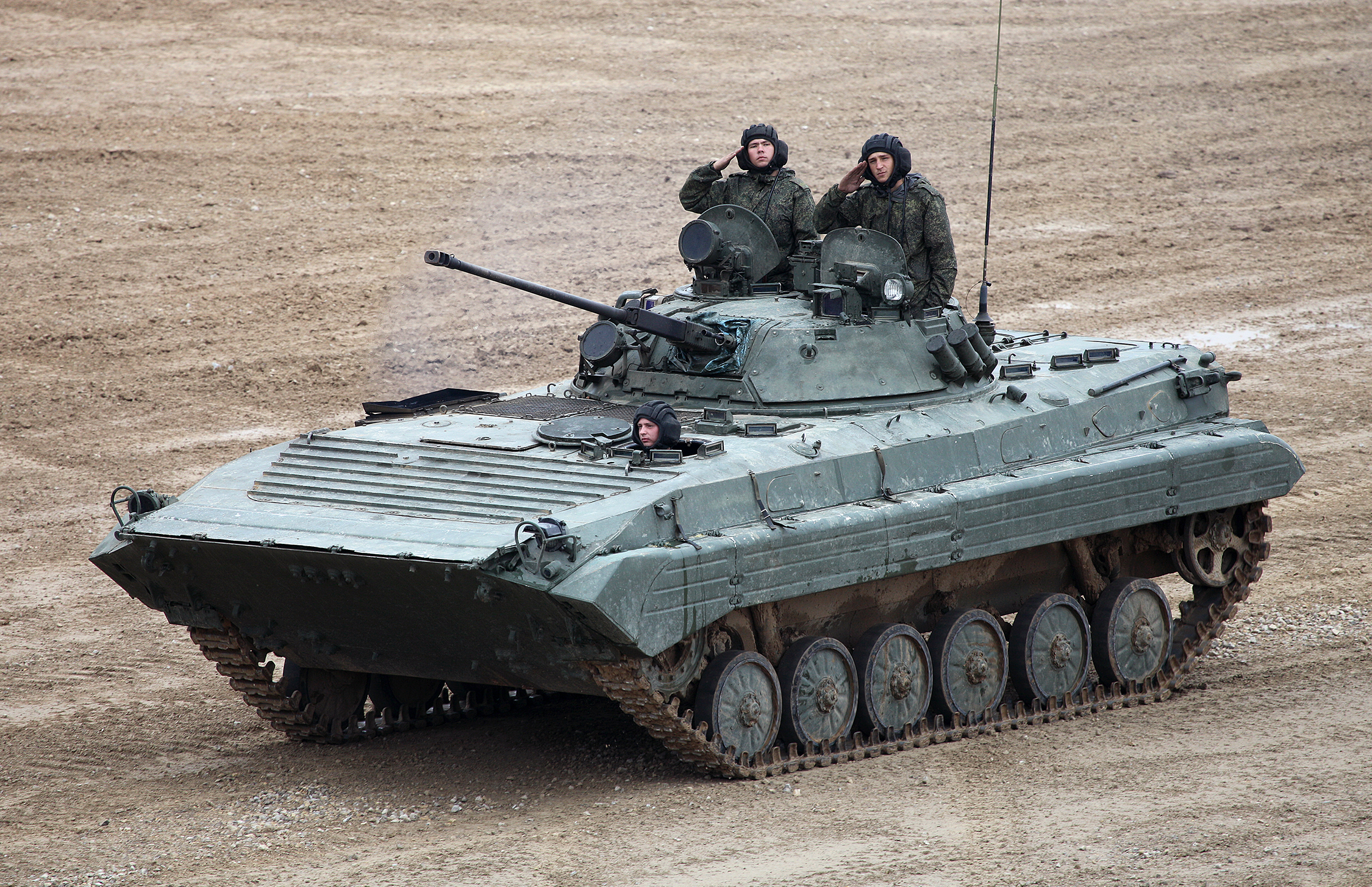
A Russian BMP-2 fighting vehicle

In June 2022, married couple Andrii Bohomaz (born 1986 or 1987) and Valeria Ponomarova were driving their Mazda3 to Izium in order to help Bohomaz evacuate his elderly parents from the Russian-held city. During their journey, Bohomaz accidentally drove their car towards the front lines of the conflict. Their car was struck with a 30 millimetre round fired from the gun on a BMP-2 fighting vehicle.

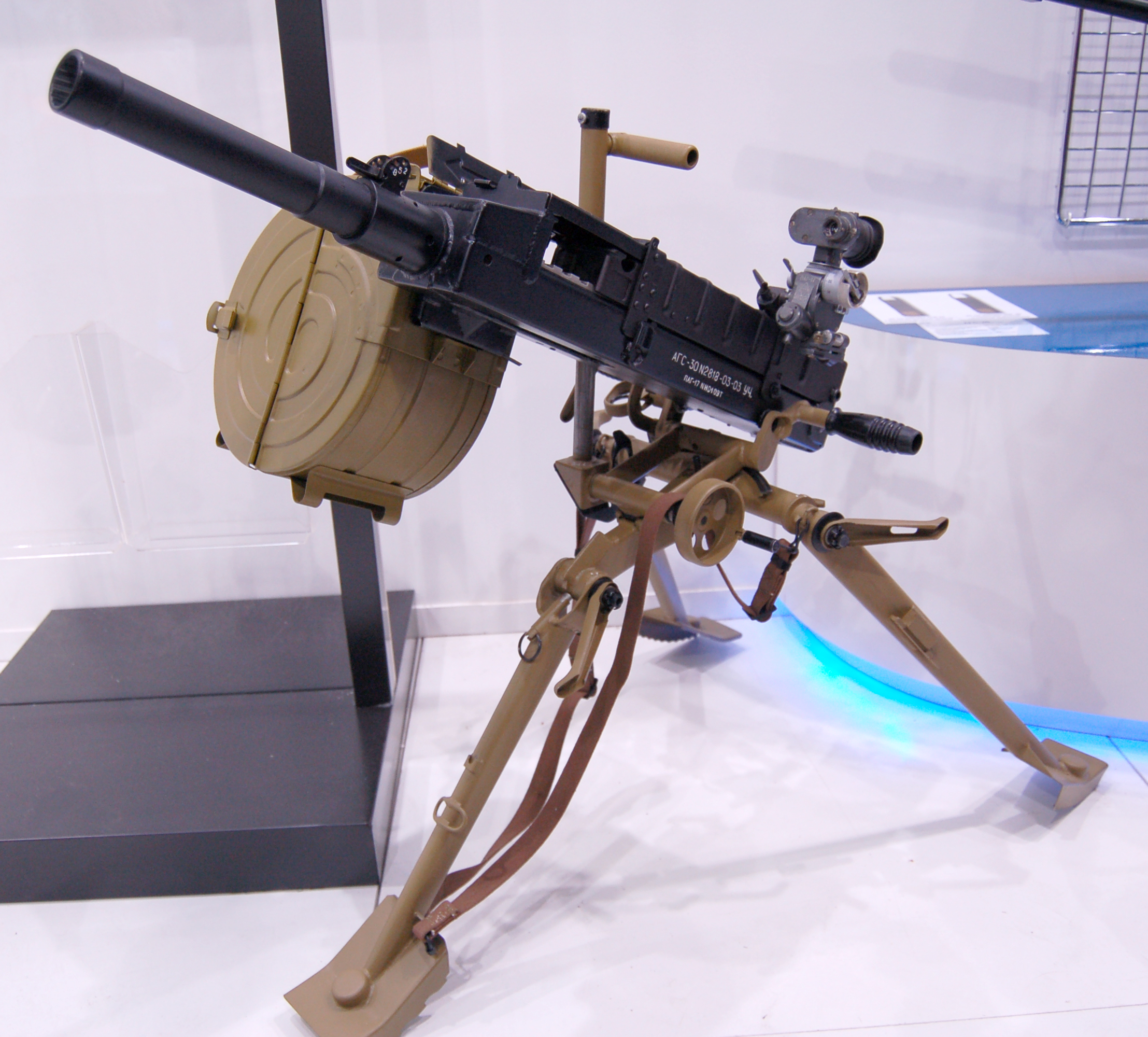
A Russian automatic grenade launcher

The couple fled from their damaged car, before returning to it soon after. The car sustained fire from an automatic grenade launcher, badly injuring Bohomaz on the head and prompting the couple to exit the car again. Ponomarova helped the injured Bohomaz to move behind the car. His injuries prevented him from moving and Ponomarova administered first aid to him, using towels on his wounds, which were forming a puddle on the road.

The events had been observed by a reconnaissance drone operated by nearby Ukrainian armed forces. The Ukrainian military sent over a second drone. Ponomarova observed the drone, not knowing if it was Ukrainian or Russian. The drone operator moved the drone in an attempt to encourage Ponomarova to follow it. Ponomarova screamed in distress to the drone operators via its camera system and did not understand the drone operator's signalling intent.

The drone's depleted battery forced the operators to return it to them. While it was being charged, the drone operator wrote "Follow Me" in Ukrainian on a piece of paper with a marker. He attached the sign and flew back to the scene. Ponomarova phoned Bohomaz's brother to ask for his advice. Ponomarova saw the drone, but did not initially see the sign and did not leave, and indicated to the drone operators Bohomaz's need for medical assistance. Russian shells continued to land nearby. After the drone operator lowered the drone, she saw the Follow Me sign. After receiving advice from Bohomaz's brother, she followed the drone. Unable to carry Bohomaz, Ponomarova left him and told him that she would return.

As she fled, Russian soldiers arrived at the attack location, and moved Bohomaz to a ditch where they abandoned him.

Ponomarova met the Ukrainian military team, and requested to return to Bohomaz, but they prevented her from doing so.

== Immediate aftermath ==
An intercepted phone call from Russian fighters indicated they incorrectly understood Bohomaz to be dead.

30 hours later, Bohomaz awoke. He had thirty pieces of shrapnel in his torso, four lodged in his head, six in his back, three in his spleen, twenty-three in his limbs. Over the period of 40 minutes, stopping several times, Bohomaz walked to the Ukrainian position. Ukrainian soldiers were shocked that he survived, noting his multiple injuries. They made a video and sent it to Ponomarova.

== Later aftermath ==
Later, Ukrainian military liberated the area, enabling Ukrainian police to investigate the scene.

Bohomaz underwent six surgeries.

Ukrainian police have accused Russian commander Klim Kerzhaev of the shooting, based on their interceptions of his phone call to his wife on the day of the shooting. Kerzhaev was part of the 2nd Guards Motor Rifle Division of the Russian Ground Forces. As of March 2023, Bohomaz was receiving treatment for injuries to his spine, brain, and chest.

The events featured in the 2022 documentary Follow Me, produced by Ukrainian director Lubomir Levitski.
