= 13th Motor Rifle Division NKVD =

13th Motorized Rifle Division of the NKVD Internal Troops May 1942 – 15 August 1942
- Country: Soviet Union
- Branch: NKVD
- Type: Infantry
- Engagements: World War II: Second Battle of Kharkov. Fighting in the area Izium-Kupiansk; Voronezh-Ostrogozhsk-Borisoglebsk

Commanders
- Notable commanders: Colonel V.A.Gorishnii

The 13th Motorized Rifle Division of the NKVD Internal Troops (Russian: 13-я мотострелковая дивизия внутренних войск НКВД СССР 13-y motostrelkovaya diviziya vnutrenikh voisk NKVD SSSR) was formed as a division of the NKVD, but was used as a division of the Red Army Rifle Division during short period of World War II.

The Division was formed in Voronezh region in May 1942, using the management and part of the forces of 8th Motorized Rifle Division of the NKVD internal troops as the basis.

== Composition ==
In May 1942 the division included:

- 4th Motorized Rifle Regiment of the Red Banner
- 266th Motorized Rifle Regiment
- 274th Motorized Rifle Regiment

Also in the Division was handed over to the 287th Rifle Regiment of the 3rd Rifle Division of the internal troops of the NKVD.

As part of the 6th Army of the Southwestern Front, the Division participated in the Second Battle of Kharkov. In March–May 1942, the Division was advancing, and then defended in the area of Izium, keep the defense on the rivers Donets and Oskol. As part of the 38th Army the Division was fighting in the area of Kupiansk, defending Voronezh by the 287th Rifle Regiment, conducted heavy fights for Ostrogozhsk. The 287th Rifle Regiment defended Voronezh. The Division, moved on across the Don River's by order, holding back the German offensive in the area Listky-Belogory. In June 1942, the Division kept a defensive along the river Khopyor east of Borisoglebsk, has suffered heavy losses in the battle, and was relocated to Tesnitskie camp (25 km north of Tula) for reorganization.

By order of the NKVD of the USSR No. 001547 from July 28, 1942, in pursuance of the State Defense Committee Resolution number 2100-ss of 26 July 1942 the Division was handed over to the Red Army. According to the Directive the General Staff of the Red Army No. org/2/2172 on August 2, 1942, the Division was reorganized in the 95th Rifle Division of the Red Army. By the Order of the NKVD of the USSR from August 15, 1942 No. 001692 the 13th Motorized Rifle Division was excluded from the NKVD because was transferred into the Red Army.

== Subordinate Units ==
External image
- Officers of the 13th Motorized Rifle Division of the NKVD at the day of its transfer to the Red Army

On 15 August 1942 the division included:

- 4th Motorized Rifle Regiment of the Red Banner
- 266th Rifle Regiment
- 274th Rifle Regiment
- 289th Rifle Regiment
- Separate Logistics Company
- Separate Medical Company

=== Commanders ===
- The Division commander, Colonel Gorishnii V.A.
- The military commissar of Division, Senior Battalion Commissar Vlasenko I.A.
