= Lubomir Levitski =

Ukrainian filmmaker

- Любомир Левицький
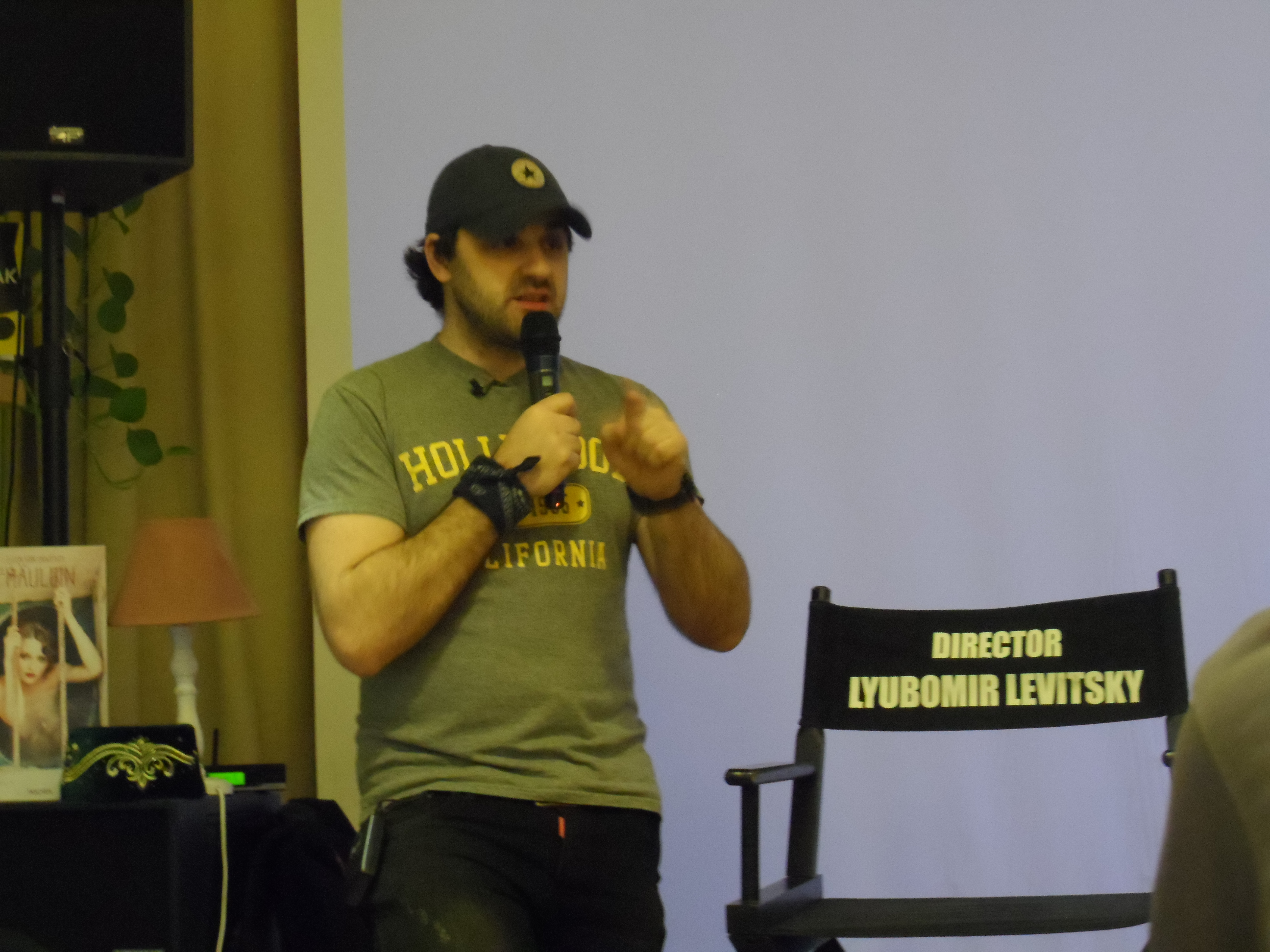
- Born: народженні Кобильчук Любомир Васильович; September 17, 1980 (age 45); Verkhovyna, Ivano-Frankivsk Oblast, Ukrainian SSR, Soviet Union
- Education: Chernivtsi University
- Occupation: Filmmaker
- Notable work: Follow Me (2022 documentary)

Lubomir Vasyliovych Levitski (Ukrainian: Любомир Васильович Левицький, romanized: Liubomyr Vasyliovych Levytskyi; September 17, 1980) is a Ukrainian film director, screenwriter and producer most noted for his production of the 2006 horror film Tunnel.

In 2023, he released the documentary Follow Me, a reporting on the Shooting of Andrii Bohomaz.

== Early life and education ==
Levitski was born on September 17, 1980, in Verkhovyna, Ivano-Frankivsk Oblast. He studied archeology at Chernivtsi University before attending film school in Germany.

== Career ==
Levitski is a director, producer, and film maker. In 2006, with screenwriter Oleksiy Khoroshko, Levitski directed the horror Штольня [UK]. Marta Shokalo writing for BBC News Ukrainian noted how unusual it is for a Ukrainian language film to be in a genre other than Ukrainian nationalism. In the film students navigate an underground maze searching for a lost idol of the Slavic god Perun. While many well known critics avoided reviewing the film, those who did largely produced positive reviews.

Levitski has produced television commercials, as well as working on the films: Штольня (English: Stolnya, 2006), Ломбард [UK] (Pawnshop, 2013), Тіні незабутих предків [UK] (Shadows of Unforgotten Ancestors, 2013), Хранитель шляху (Guardian of the Path, 2015), Smash (2015), #SelfieParty [UK] (2016), as well as short films Обійми мене (Hug Me, 2009) and 20 доларів (20 Dollars, 2007), and the 2021 comedy Скажене весілля 3 [UK] (Crazy Wedding 3). In 2007, his film Штольня (Stolnya) won Best Trailer, Best Poster and Best Advertising Slogan at the IV Kyiv International Film Forum Ukraine, dubbed the Ukrainian Oscars by the media publication Telekritika [UK].

In 2023, Levitski released the film Follow Me, a documentary about the Shooting of Andrii Bohomaz.

== Personal life ==
Levitski is married with one son.

== Filmography ==
Year	Type	Name	Original name	Credited as				Notes
Year	Type	Name	Original name	Director	Scriptwriter	Producer	Other	Notes
2004	Animated film	Terkel in Trouble	Terkel i knibe	—N/a	—N/a	—N/a	Yes	Ukrainian-language dubbing director; in the credits it is listed as "Lyubomyr Kobylchuk-Levytskyi"
2006	Feature film	Tunnel	Штольня	Yes	Yes	No	—N/a	The first debut full-length feature film; listed as "Lyubomyr Kobylchuk" in the credits
2007	Short film	20 dollars	20 доларів	Yes	Yes	Yes	—N/a	Russian-language short film shot in Ukraine
2009	Short film	Hug me	Обними меня	Yes	Yes	No	—N/a	Russian-language short film shot in Ukraine
2013	Feature film	Pawnshop (film)	Ломбард	Yes	Yes	No	—N/a	Russian-language feature film shot in Ukraine; Ukrainian dubbing was made for Ukrainian distribution
2013	Feature film	Shadows of Unorgotten Ancestors	Тіні незабутих предків	Yes	Yes	No	—N/a	Ukrainian-language feature film shot in Ukraine for distribution
2016	Feature film	#SelfieParty	#SelfieParty	Yes	No	No	—N/a	Ukrainian-language feature film shot in Ukraine
2021	Feature film	Mad Wedding 3	Скажене весілля 3	Yes	No	No	—N/a	
2023	Feature film	Captain Ukraine	Капітан Україна	Yes	Yes	Yes	—N/a	English-language feature film shot in Ukraine; the project was stopped because of the war
TBD	Feature film	Path keeper	Хранитель пути	Yes	No	No	—N/a	"Kazakh Russian-language film shot in Kazakhstan"
TBD	Feature film	Sceleton in the closet		Yes	No	No	—N/a	American feature film
TBD	Feature film	Black Friday		Yes	No	No	—N/a	American project; canceled at the stage of writing the script

== See also ==
- Cinema of Ukraine
