= Izium =

City in Kharkiv Oblast, Ukraine

Izium Ізюм Izyum
- City
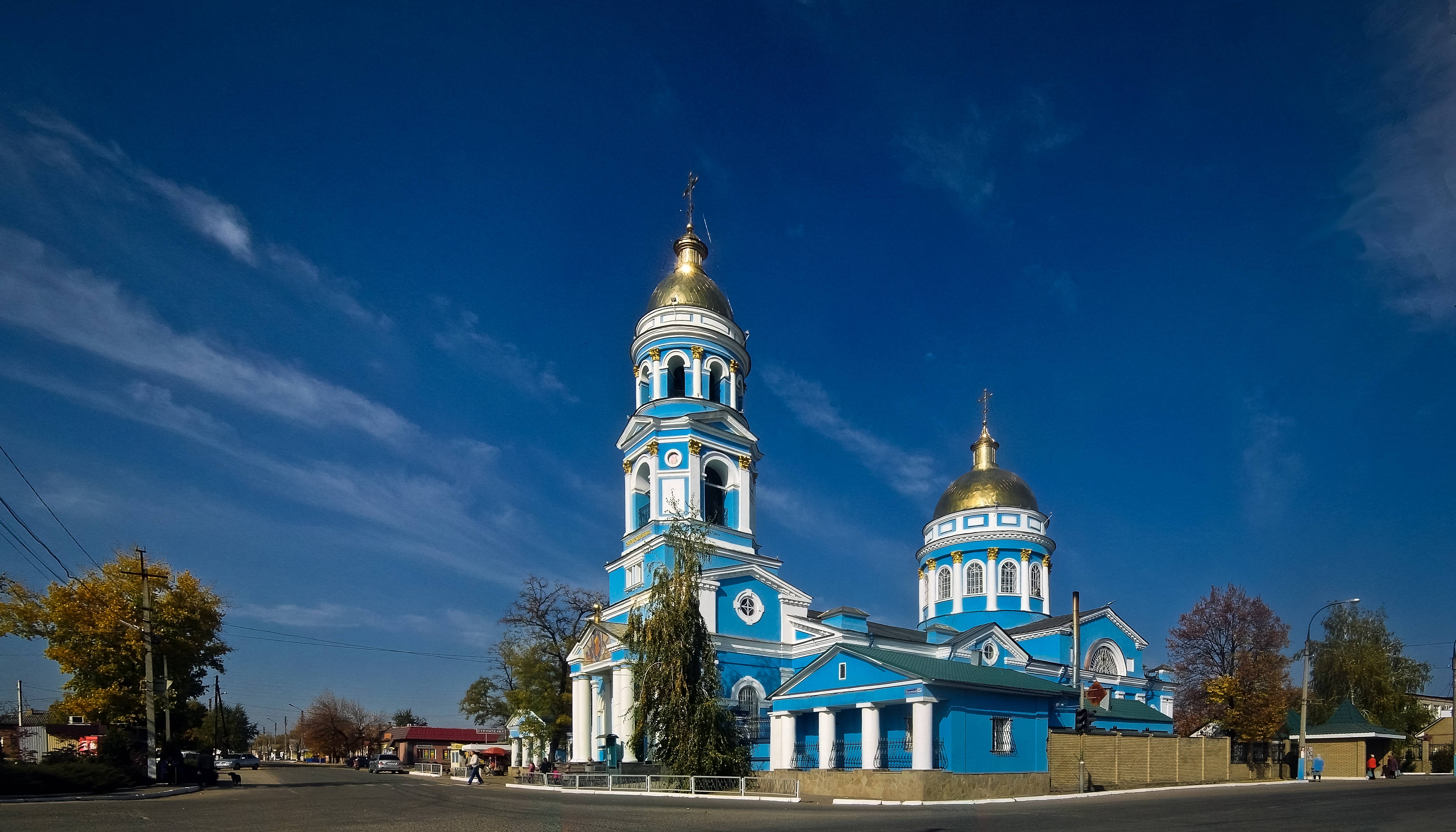
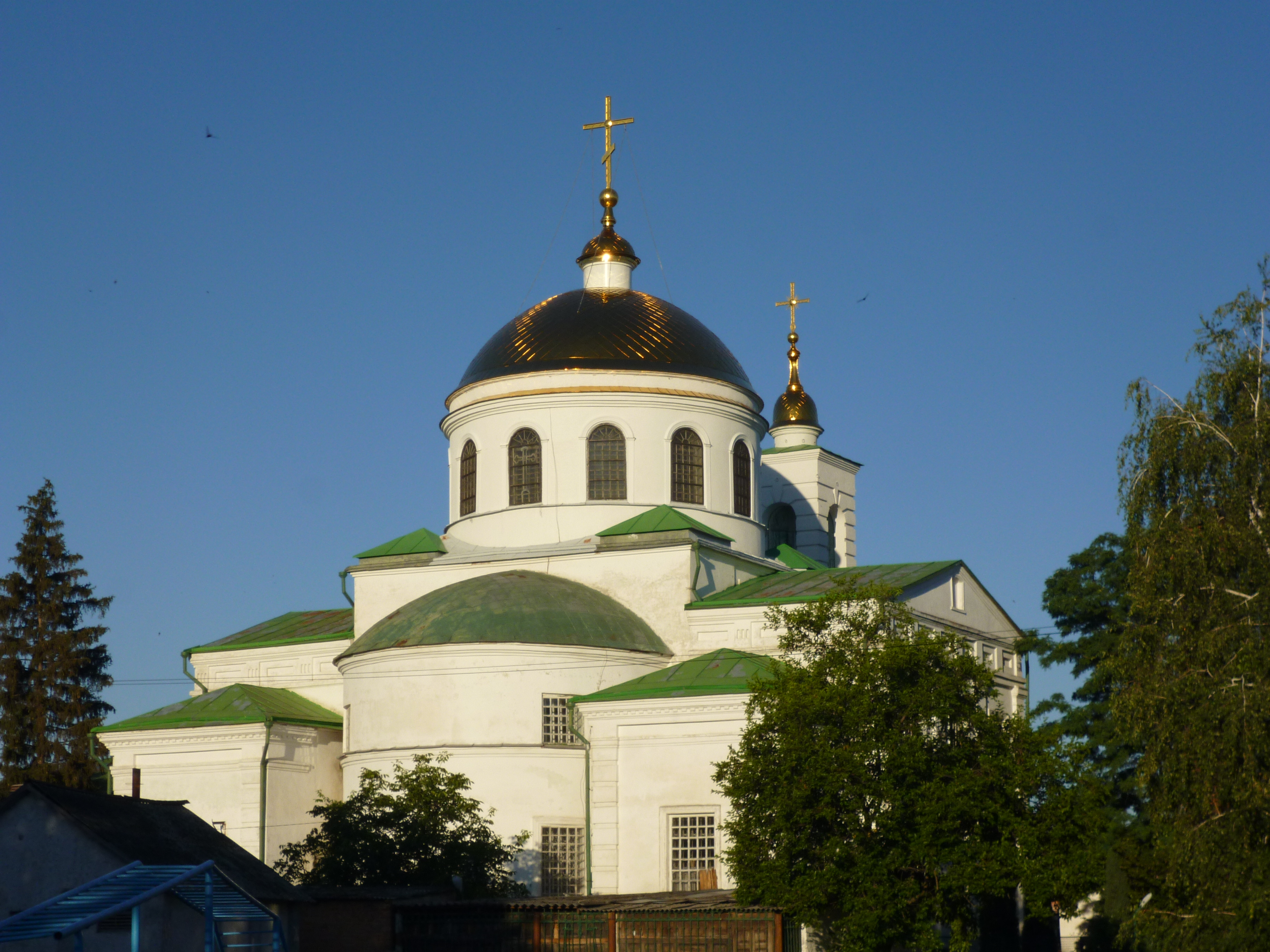
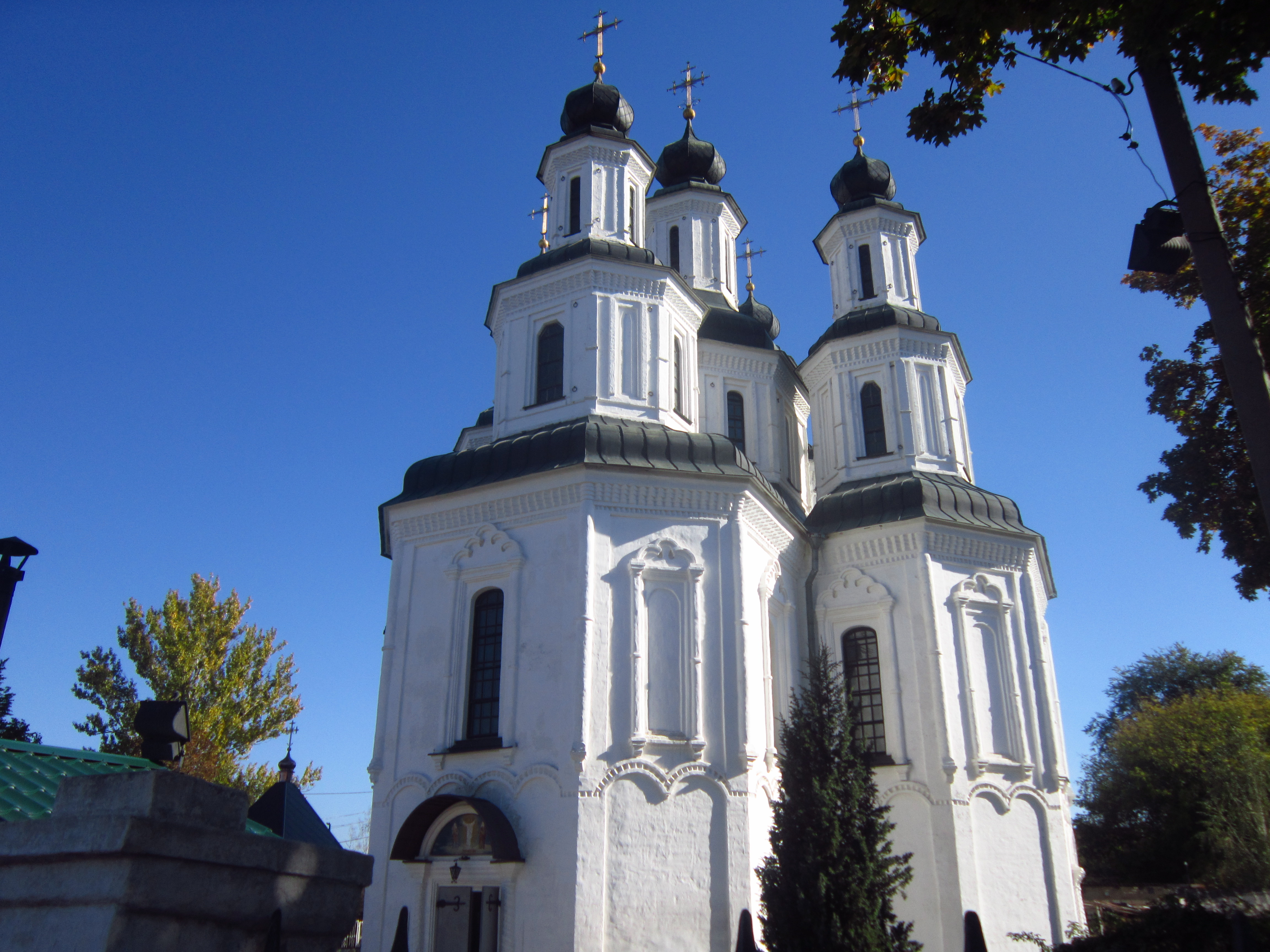
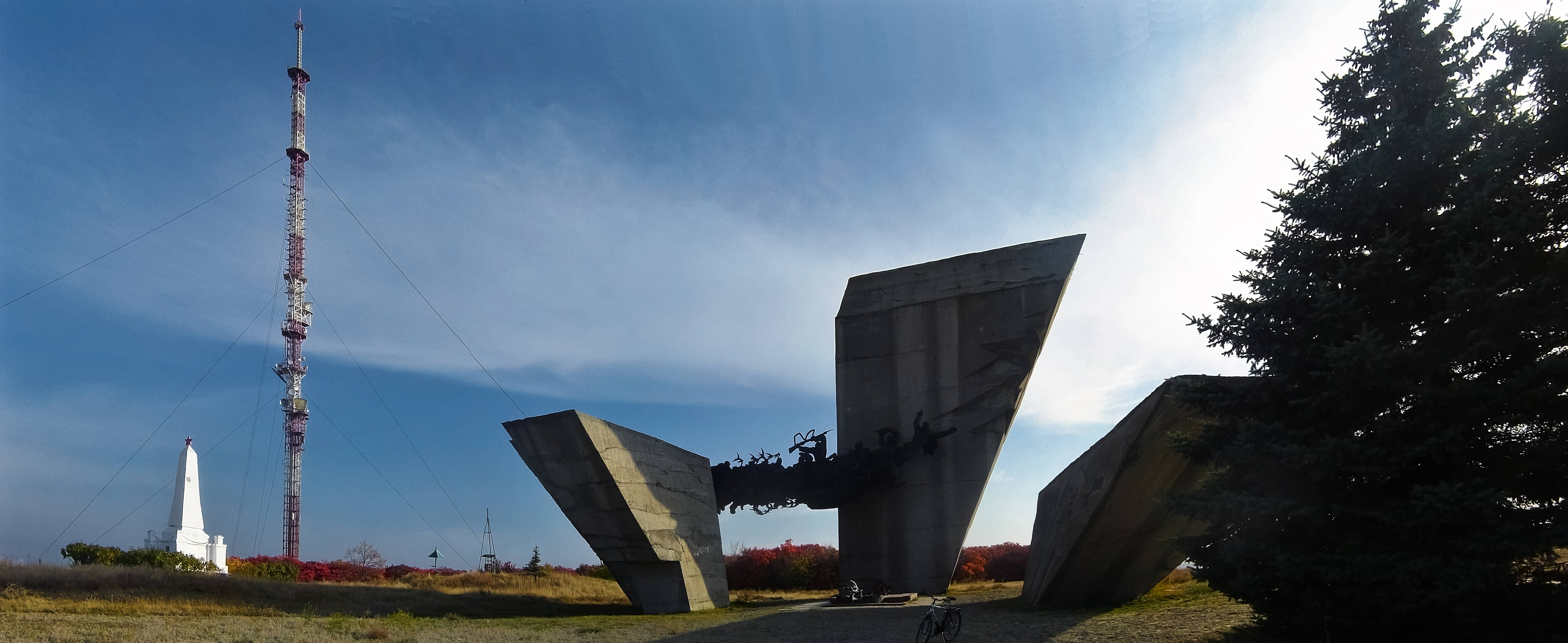
- From top, left to right: Ascension Cathedral; Church of the Exaltation of the Cross; Church of Transfiguration; World War II memorial

- Flag Coat of arms
- Interactive map of Izium
- Location of Izium in Kharkiv Oblast Location of Izium in Ukraine
- Coordinates: 49°12′46″N 37°15′25″E
- Country: Ukraine
- Oblast: Kharkiv Oblast
- Raion: Izium Raion
- Hromada: Izium urban hromada
- Founded: 1681
- City status: 1765

Government
  - Mayor: Valerii Marchenko (Servant of the People)

Area
  - Total: 43.6 km^{2} (16.8 sq mi)
- Elevation: 71 m (233 ft)

Population (2022)
  - Total: 44,979
  - Density: 1,030/km^{2} (2,670/sq mi)
- Postal code: 64300
- Area code: 380-5743
- License plate: АХ, КХ
- Website: city-izyum.gov.ua

Izium or Izyum (Ukrainian: Ізюм, IPA: [iˈzʲum]; Russian: Изюм) is a city on the Donets River in Kharkiv Oblast, eastern Ukraine that serves as the administrative center of Izium Raion and Izium urban hromada. It is about 120 kilometres (75 mi) southeast of the city of Kharkiv, the oblast's administrative center.

Izium has a population of 44,979 (2022 estimate), making it the second-most populous city in Kharkiv Oblast behind Kharkiv proper. It has held economic significance for centuries due to its position as a transportation link between Kharkiv and the Donbas region to the southeast.

The area around Izium has been periodically inhabited since ancient times, but the modern city has its origins in a 17th-century fortress defending against Tatar raids. Izium was the site of several battles during World War II, but still grew rapidly during the 20th century due to its importance as a transport hub. During the Russian invasion of Ukraine, Russian forces occupied the city in April 2022 after a battle that destroyed much of the city. The city was recaptured by Ukrainian forces in the 2022 Kharkiv counteroffensive.

== History ==
=== Pre-founding ===
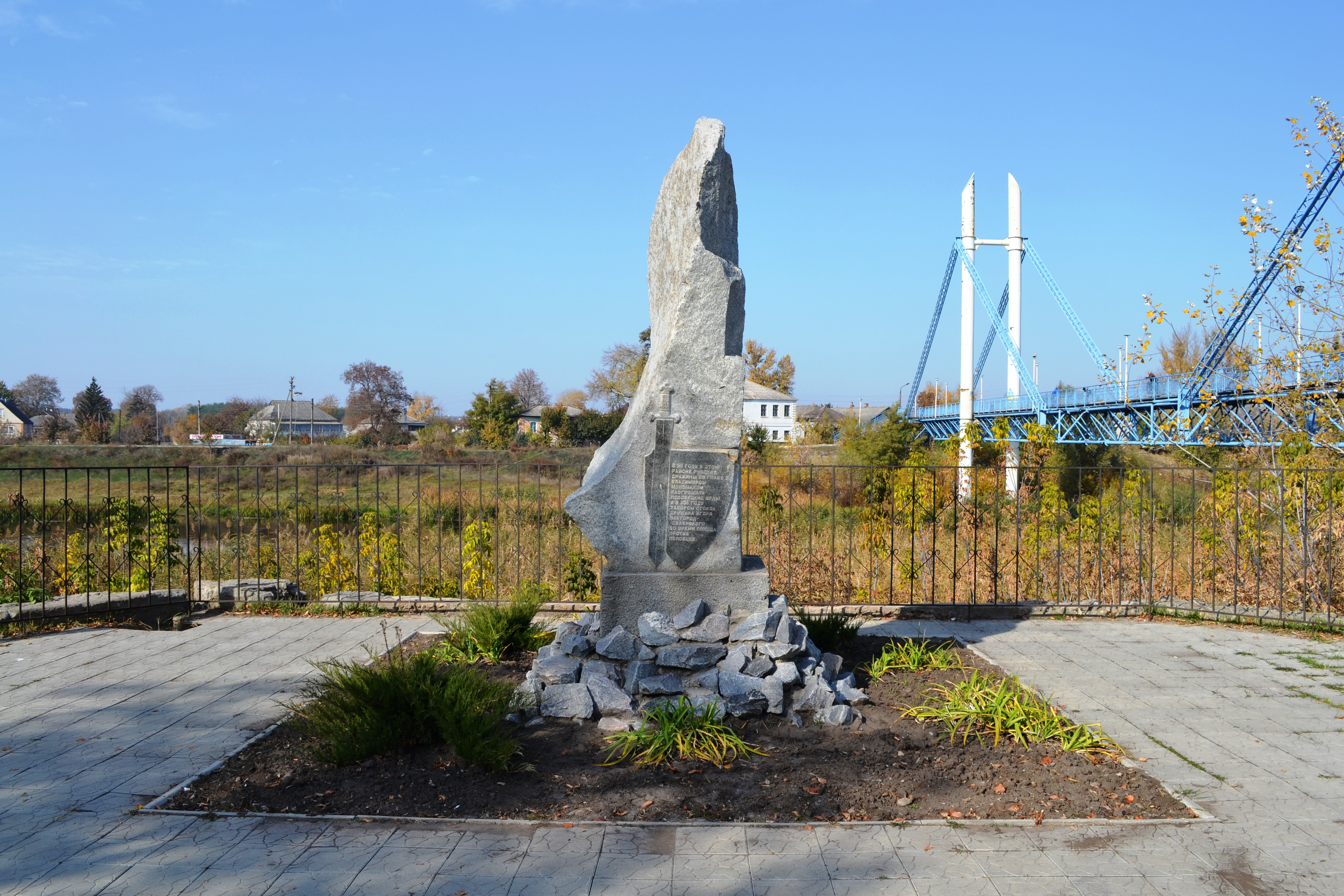
A monument commemorating the Battle of the Salnitsa river

The area that is now Izium has been inhabited since ancient times. Archeologists have discovered remnants of Mesolithic settlements from the 13th- to 6th-century BC, and Neolithic settlements from the fifth- to third-century BC. These finds include ceramic implements and flint tools. The "Bondarisi" archeological tract near Izium gives its name to the Bondarikha culture.

The territory was later part of the ancient East Slavic state Kievan Rus. In the 12th century AD Kievan Rus began to disintegrate, leading to increased incursions by Cuman nomads. In the year 1111, the territory that is now modern Izium was the site of the Battle of the Salnytsia River, in which the East Slavs, led by Vladimir II Monomakh and Sviatopolk II of Kiev, defeated a Cuman army on the Salnytsia river. The larger conflict between the East Slavs and the Cumans continued until the early 13th century. The area around Izium was devastated in the 1240s by the Mongol Empire and its invasion of the already collapsing Kievan Rus.

=== Founding and early history ===
Settlement of the region by Slavs did not resume until the late 15th century, after the creation of a new centralized East Slavic state in the form of the Principality of Moscow, more intensified settlement took place on the banks of the Donets river. As the Principality of Moscow evolved into the Tsardom of Russia, there was an effort to secure the southern border of the East Slavic lands, to stop the "devastating" attacks by the Crimean Tatars. The Izium Trail, one of the branches of the Muravsky Trail, was a warpath of the Crimeans in the area in the 16th and 17th centuries before the official founding of the city, passing near the future location of Izium.

In response, Muscovy built fortifications in the Sloboda Ukraine region, like the Belgorod line (1635–1658) and the Izium line (1679–80), causing the Izium Trail to fall into disuse and easing invader pressure on Muscovy's border. In 1681, a fortress named Izium was built by colonel Donets of the Kharkiv Sloboda Cossack Regiment within a small settlement on the location of Izium. This is generally regarded as the foundation date of Izium.

The origin of the name "Izium" is uncertain. It may originate from a Turkic-language word "huzun", meaning "a crossing", or from the Mokryi Iziumets (also simply Iziumets) river that the city was built on the banks of, or from a Tatar word "izzun" meaning "long", or "elongated". According to historical materials, it is likely that a Tatar settlement existed on nearby Mount Kremenets as early as the 14th century, which makes it likely that the name of the town has some sort of Tatar origin. In Ukrainian and Russian, the town's name is spelled the exact same way as the word for "raisin", but historian V. V. Markin argues that this is a coincidence, and any connection to a supposed Turkic word meaning "raisin" is false etymology. Markin notes that it would have probably been impossible to grow grapes in the area, making such a name illogical, and argues that such a word "huzun" meaning "raisin" does not exist in any Turkic language.

Izium grew to be an important defense against Tatar invasions of the region. In 1684, Izium's Transfiguration Cathedral was built. Starting from 1685 and until 1765, Izium served as the seat of the Izium Regiment within Sloboda Ukraine Governorate. Residents of Izium took part in the Bulavin Rebellion of 1707–1708. On 7 October 1707, not far from Izium, a detachment of salt workers from Bakhmut and Cossacks led by Kondraty Bulavin defeated a Tsarist punitive expedition heading to Bakhmut. In summer 1708, Bulavin sent a squad to Izium, but this was defeated by the Tsarist authorities, and the rebellion overall ended in defeat. In 1708, due to the 1708 Russian administrative reform, Izium was assigned to Azov Governorate. In 1718, it was reassigned to Belgorod Province inside Kiev Governorate.

=== Russian Empire ===
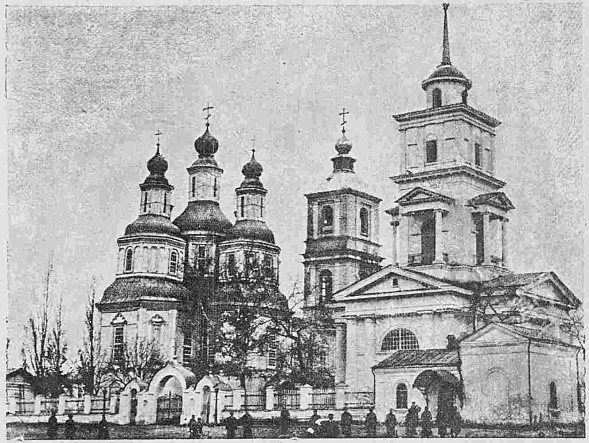
The Church of Transfiguration, pictured in 1897

In 1765, after the Izium Regiment was converted into a regular Russian hussar regiment as part of the abolition of the Cossack system in Sloboda Ukraine, Izium received city status and was assigned to Sloboda Ukraine Governorate of the recently proclaimed Russian Empire. Starting in 1780, Izium was the administrative center of Izyumsky Uyezd. Izyumsky Uyezd was originally a subdivision of Kharkov Viceroyalty in 1780, but was transferred to the reformed Sloboda Ukraine Governorate in 1796.

In 1809, construction began on Saint Nicholas's church in Izium. Construction was finished in 1823, and today the church is one of Izium's most notable architectural features. In 1835, Izyumsky Uyezd was transferred again, this time to Kharkov Governorate.

By the 18th and 19th centuries, Izium was considered one of the largest economic centers in the Sloboda Ukraine region. By the 1880s, factories producing bricks, vodka, butter, lard, and wax operated in Izium. By 1884, the city's main exports were wool, sold to Kharkiv and Poltava, and building materials sold to Taganrog. It had a population of 14,761 people.

In 1910, the Kharkiv-Donbas railway that passed through the city was built. In 1916, in accordance with an edict by Tsar Nicholas II, the construction of an optical glass plant began in Izium. This was the first optical glass plant to be built in the Russian Empire.

=== 20th century and early 21st century ===
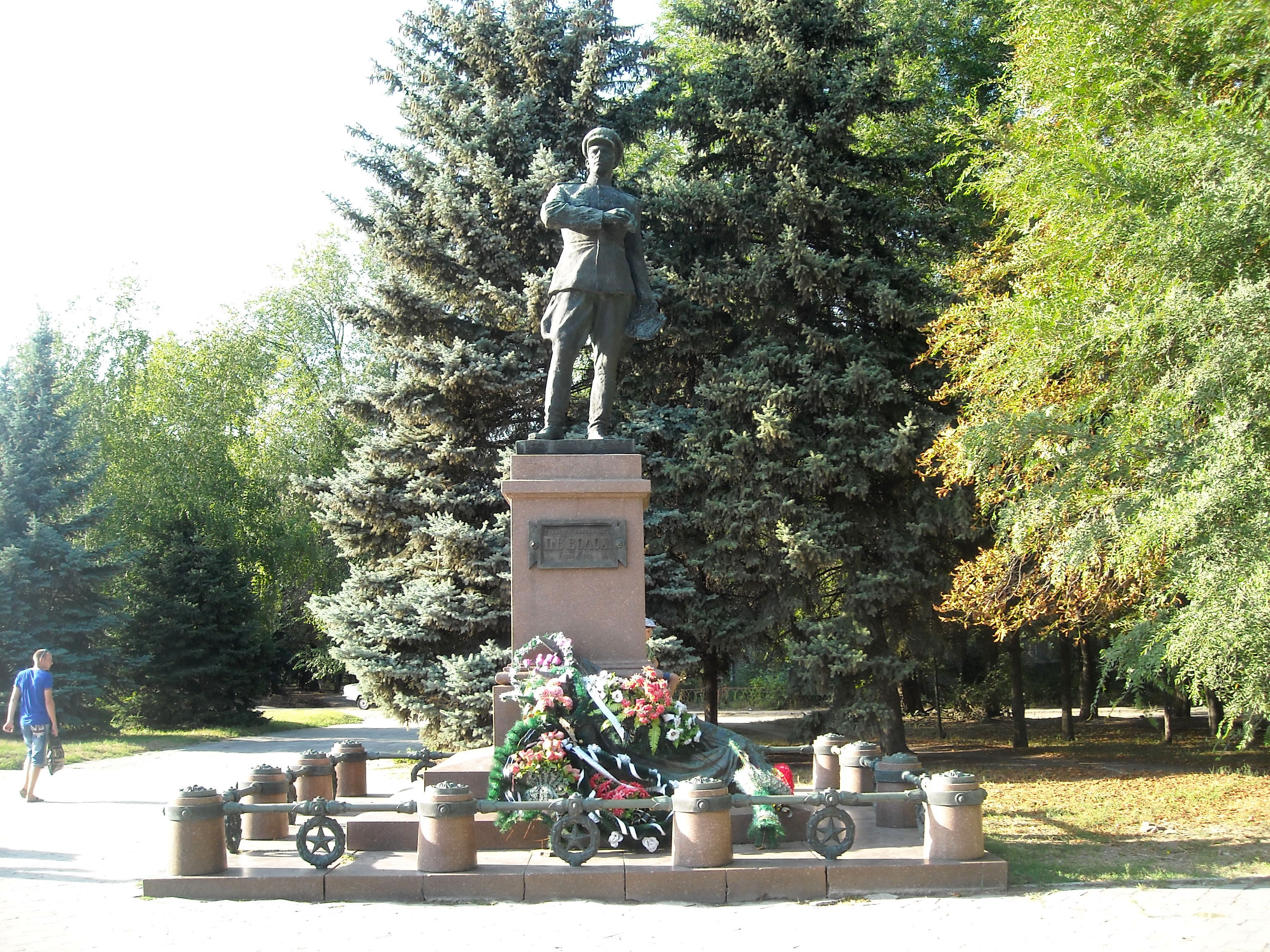
The monument to Pyotr Volokh in Izium

Izium changed hands several times during the Russian Civil War between 1918 and 1920, before finally being taken by the victorious Bolsheviks, who established the Soviet Union on the territory of the former Russian Empire. In 1923, Izium became the administrative center of the newly formed Izium Okruha inside the Ukrainian SSR. In 1930, in accordance with republic-wide abolition of the okruha system in the Ukrainian SSR, Izium Okruha was abolished and replaced with Izium Raion, which was subordinated directly to the federal government of Soviet Ukraine. In 1932, Izium and Izium Raion were assigned to the newly created Kharkiv Oblast of the Ukrainian SSR. Izium was incorporated as a city of oblast significance; while Izium served as the administrative center of the raion, it did not belong to it, being subordinated directly to Kharkiv Oblast.

Izium suffered under the repressions of Soviet dictator Joseph Stalin. As a result of the Holodomor, a manmade famine in Soviet Ukraine between 1932 and 1933, 2,761 people from Izium are documented to have died.

During World War II, Izium was the site of numerous important battles. A Red Army salient was cut off by counterattacking German forces during the Second Battle of Kharkiv and was eliminated in one of the most expensive learning errors for the Red Army. Izium was occupied by the German Army starting on 24 June 1942. The Germans operated a Nazi prison in the city. Izium was liberated by the Red Army on 5 February 1943. In mid-March 1943, German troops attacked Izium again, but were unsuccessful, according to Soviet sources. There were more clashes near the city in summer 1943, during the Izyum–Barvenkovo offensive. Soviet Lieutenant General Pyotr Volokh, commander of the 18th Mechanized Corps that fought on the Izium bridgehead, died in combat in the southern outskirts of the city. On 13 September 1950, after the end of the war, a monument to Volokh was unveiled in Izium. Until 2022, there was also a street named after Volokh.

Izium's population grew rapidly in the 20th century due to its importance as a junction between Kharkiv and the Donbas. In January 1989 the population was 64,334 people, up from 12,000 in 1926.

During the 2010 Ukrainian presidential election, more than 85% of people in Izium voted for Viktor Yanukovych. In January 2013, Izium's population was 51,511 people.

=== Russo-Ukrainian War ===
==== War in Donbas and decommunization ====
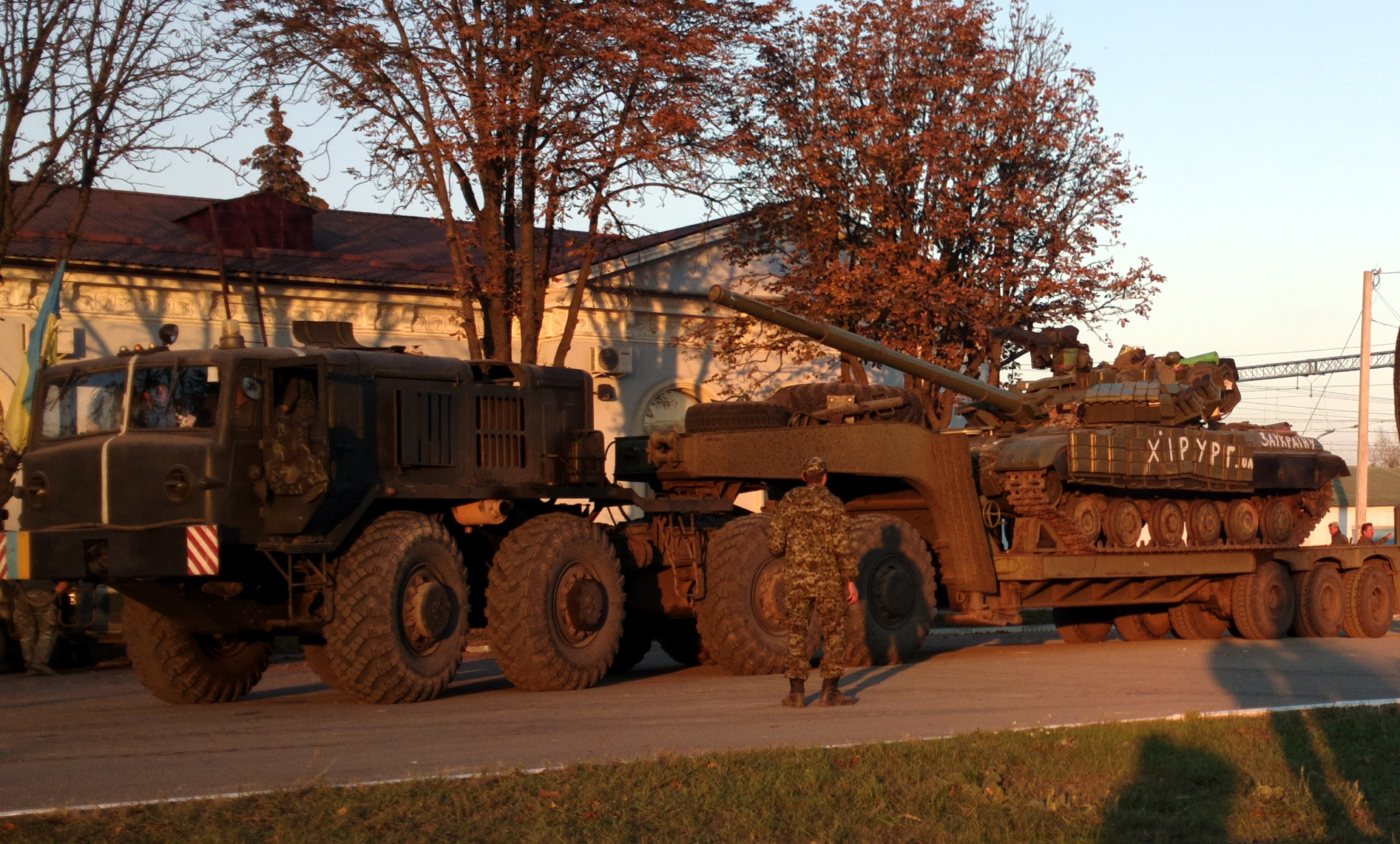
Ukrainian tanks in Izium, October 2014

Deutsche Welle (DW) reported in April 2014 that during the 2014 pro-Russian unrest in Ukraine, there was only one attempt to hoist the Russian flag on any government buildings in Izium. Many of the people who had voted for Yanukovych in 2010 still supported him amidst the Euromaidan protests that ousted him. Most of the people DW interviewed supported some kind of federalization of Ukraine, or united Ukraine, and did not support the idea of joining the Russian Federation. A local government official said that out of the approximately 50,000 inhabitants, Izium had "a maximum of 200 active pro-Russian people".

Izium was the site of sporadic fighting during the beginning of the war in Donbas in 2014. The Sloviansk-Izium highway was referred to as the "highway of death" by locals during the summer of 2014 due to constant shelling from pro-Russian separatists. Izium was seen as an important link between separatist-held Sloviansk and Kharkiv, which also had active pro-Russian movements, and there were fears that separatists would move in that direction. During Ukraine's Siege of Sloviansk to reclaim it from the separatists, Izium was used as a base for operations by the Ukrainian military. Large-scale fighting in the proximity of Izium halted once Ukrainian forces liberated Sloviansk in July 2014.

On 30 September 2014, a monument to Vladimir Lenin in Izium was destroyed by unknown persons. This came as part of a larger trend of demolition of monuments to Vladimir Lenin in Ukraine. To comply with nationwide decommunization laws enacted in 2016, the local "Lenin Square" was renamed "John Lennon Square" in February 2016.

Izium urban hromada was formed on 14 June 2019, as an amalgamated hromada with its administrative center in Izium by uniting the Izium city council with a nearby village council. On 12 June 2020, the hromada was expanded to include several other local councils, and, along with all other amalgamated hromadas in the country, was converted into a plain hromada. On 18 July 2020, the city of Izium, along with the rest of the hromada, was subordinated to Izium Raion, as part of the administrative reform of Ukraine. The area of Izium Raion was also significantly expanded to include the area of several other raions, which reduced the number of raions of Kharkiv Oblast to seven.

==== Russian invasion of Ukraine ====
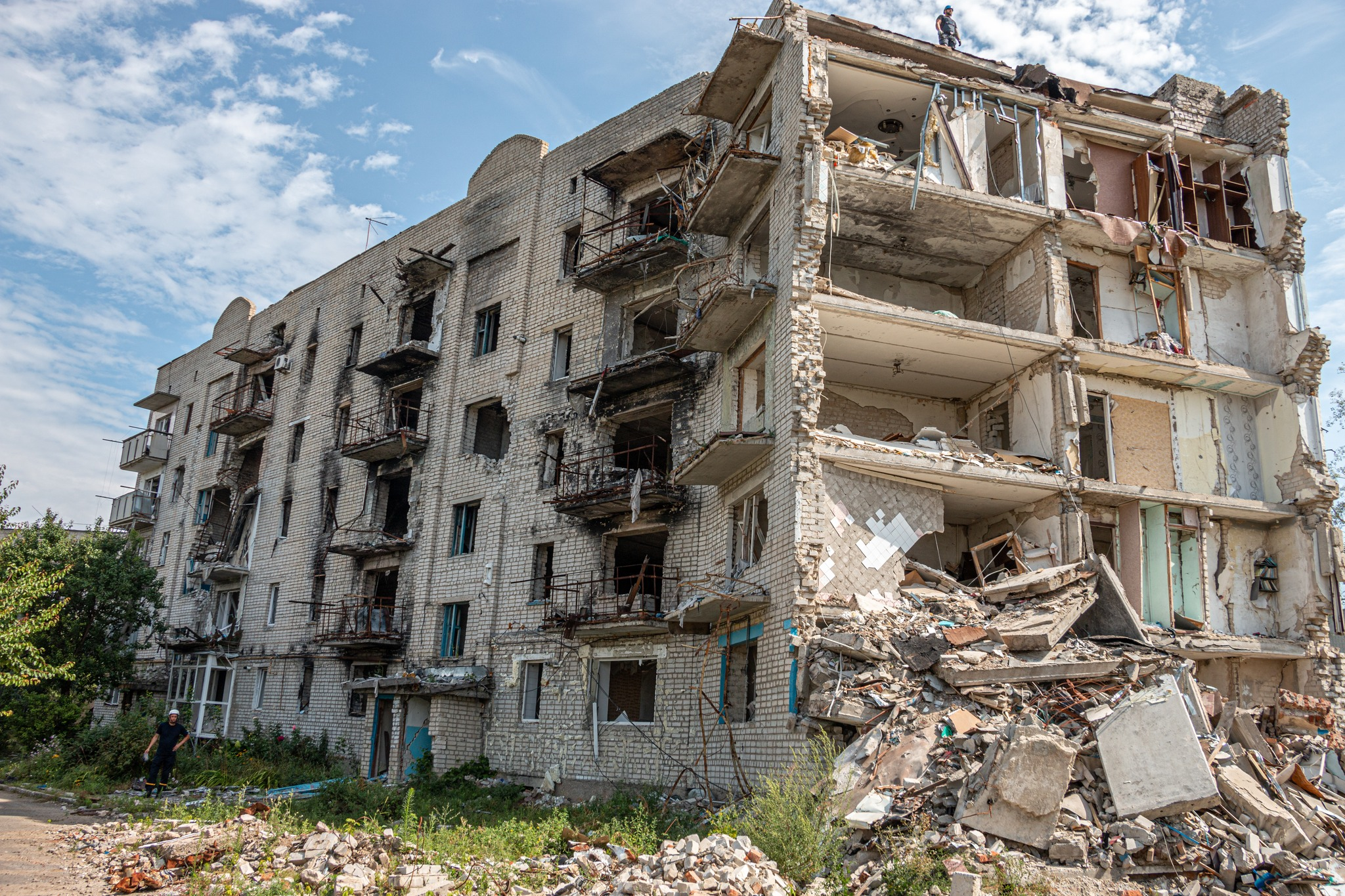
A building in Izium destroyed in March 2022, pictured in August 2023 during reconstruction attempts

During the full-scale Russian invasion of Ukraine, Russia began trying to take Izium in March 2022, beginning the battle of Izium. Its importance as a rail hub made it an important target for the invading Russian military. On 9 March, Russian forces used a large airborne munition on a civilian apartment building in Izium, killing at least 44 civilians in what Human Rights Watch called one of the deadliest attacks on civilians during the war.

Russia gained control over Izium on 1 April 2022. Russian soldiers used the "Lyceum No. 2" school as a base. The director of the school was one of the residents of Izium accused of collaborating with Russia, and would later be put on trial in Kharkiv by Ukraine after the end of occupation. On 3 April 2022, the Ukrainian government stated that two Russian soldiers were killed and 28 others hospitalized after Ukrainian civilians handed out poisoned cakes to Russian soldiers of the Russian 3rd Motor Rifle Division in Izium. In May 2022, Russian forces attempted to cross the Siverskyi Donets River and advance south. According to the British Ministry of Defense, Ukrainian forces rebuffed the attempted river crossing with substantial Russian losses. Residents of Izium said they were imprisoned, and tortured by Russian soldiers during the occupation. The June 2022 shooting of Andrii Bohomaz by Russian soldiers in Izium during the occupation was featured in Lubomir Levitski's documentary Follow Me.

Ukraine began a counteroffensive in the Kharkiv region in early September 2022, during which Izium was recaptured. During the frantic Russian retreat, the Russian soldiers "completely gutted" the school that served as their base, looting "anything of possible value", including water heaters and small sinks from each classroom. After Ukrainian troops secured the liberated city, local police officers found mass graves of 440 bodies in Izium. According to city officials, by the end of the occupation, more than 80% of the city's infrastructure was destroyed; about 70% of multi-storey buildings are destroyed. The city administration estimates that all in all, about 1,000 people lost their lives under the Russian occupation.

In December 2022, Izium decided to rename 22 street names in the city that previously held names affiliated with communism and with Russia. Among others, the street named after Pyotr Volokh was renamed to honor Hetman Pavlo Polubotok.

Unexploded ordnance has posed a major threat to Izium's population, even months after the battle. In March 2023, a local doctor said that on average, the hospital received a person with wounds from landmines every week. In September 2023, a year after the end of Russian occupation, Izium was still scarred and its people traumatized by war. Most of the city's schools were destroyed in the battles, and were planned to open by the start of 2024, so most students had to attend through online school technology. The hospital still bore heavy damage from a missile strike, and urgent surgeries were held in a "small, dank room in the basement" due to fear of Shahed drone attacks. One resident said, "People still haven’t recovered from this psychological trauma[.] This feeling of total fear that came with the occupation — it hasn’t disappeared."

== Geography ==
=== Landmarks and location ===
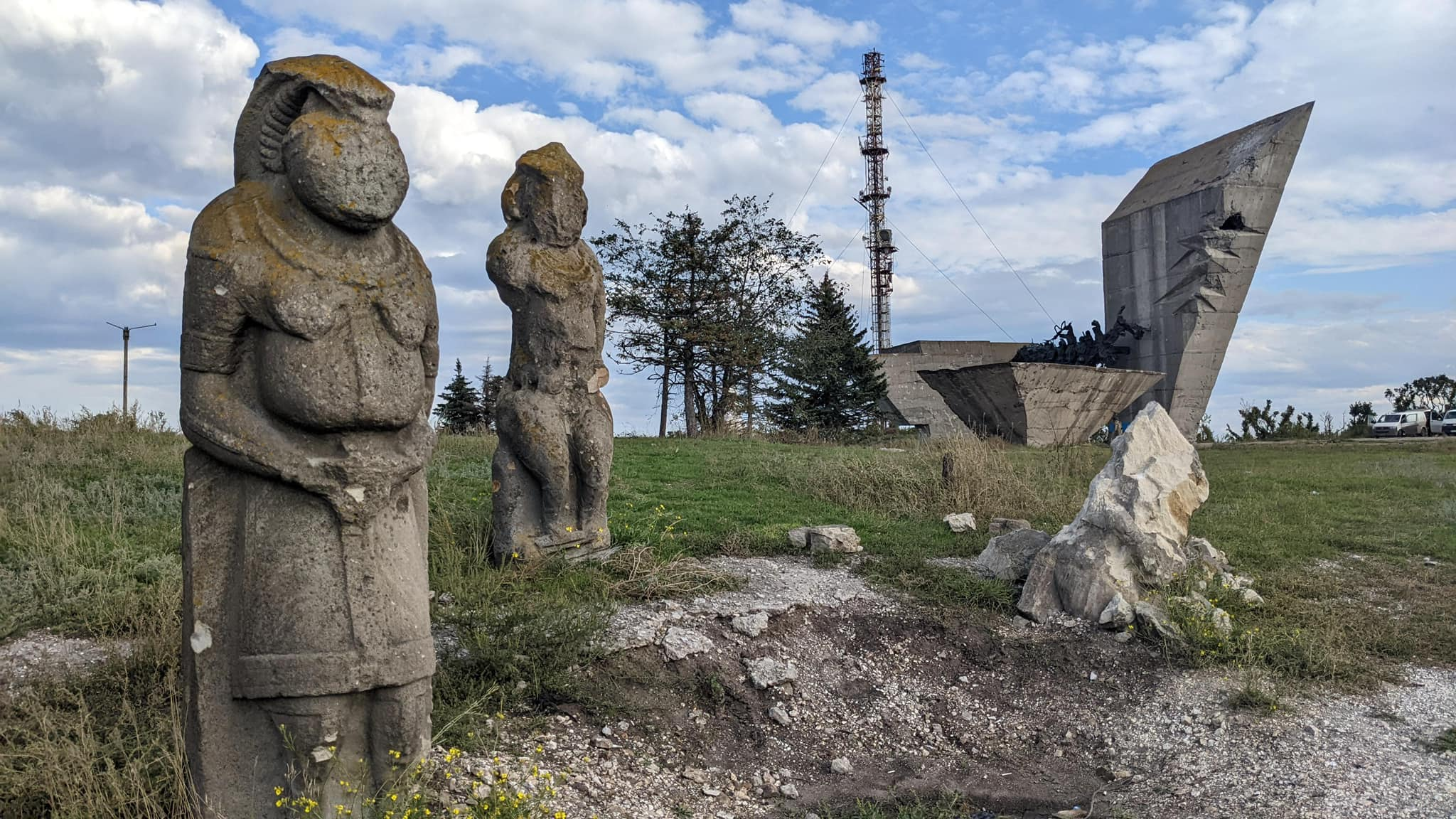
The Polovetsian statues on Kremenets, after war damage

Izium is located at the foot of the Kremenets Mountain, on the right bank of the Donets river. On top of the mountain, there are several ancient Polovtsian (Cuman) stone statues known as "stone babas", dating from the ninth- to the thirteenth-century. The statues were heavily damaged during the battle of Izium in 2022, with one being completely destroyed.

=== Climate ===
The Köppen climate classification subtype for this climate is "Dfb", warm summer continental climate.

Climate data for Izium (1981–2010, extremes 1949–2011)
Month	Jan	Feb	Mar	Apr	May	Jun	Jul	Aug	Sep	Oct	Nov	Dec	Year
Record high °C (°F)	13.1 (55.6)	16.3 (61.3)	24.0 (75.2)	31.0 (87.8)	36.7 (98.1)	38.9 (102.0)	39.9 (103.8)	39.4 (102.9)	34.4 (93.9)	31.1 (88.0)	22.0 (71.6)	20.0 (68.0)	39.9 (103.8)
Mean daily maximum °C (°F)	−1.9 (28.6)	−1.2 (29.8)	5.0 (41.0)	14.7 (58.5)	21.6 (70.9)	25.1 (77.2)	27.4 (81.3)	26.8 (80.2)	20.6 (69.1)	12.9 (55.2)	4.3 (39.7)	−0.7 (30.7)	12.9 (55.2)
Daily mean °C (°F)	−4.1 (24.6)	−4.0 (24.8)	1.3 (34.3)	9.5 (49.1)	15.6 (60.1)	19.5 (67.1)	21.5 (70.7)	20.1 (68.2)	14.4 (57.9)	8.0 (46.4)	1.6 (34.9)	−2.9 (26.8)	8.4 (47.1)
Mean daily minimum °C (°F)	−6.9 (19.6)	−7.2 (19.0)	−2.2 (28.0)	4.5 (40.1)	10.2 (50.4)	14.3 (57.7)	16.0 (60.8)	14.9 (58.8)	9.9 (49.8)	4.4 (39.9)	−1.3 (29.7)	−5.7 (21.7)	4.2 (39.6)
Record low °C (°F)	−35.0 (−31.0)	−36.1 (−33.0)	−29.7 (−21.5)	−9.0 (15.8)	−2.8 (27.0)	1.1 (34.0)	3.0 (37.4)	1.1 (34.0)	−6.7 (19.9)	−17.0 (1.4)	−22.6 (−8.7)	−33.2 (−27.8)	−36.1 (−33.0)
Average precipitation mm (inches)	47.9 (1.89)	43.3 (1.70)	44.0 (1.73)	37.9 (1.49)	48.3 (1.90)	62.8 (2.47)	58.8 (2.31)	38.2 (1.50)	48.9 (1.93)	43.0 (1.69)	46.0 (1.81)	46.2 (1.82)	565.3 (22.26)
Average precipitation days (≥ 1.0 mm)	10.4	8.8	8.4	7.0	7.2	8.5	7.5	5.2	6.7	6.5	7.7	9.2	93.1
Average relative humidity (%)	84.9	81.8	77.3	67.5	64.9	68.2	68.2	67.5	73.4	79.2	85.1	85.5	75.3
Source 1: World Meteorological Organization
Source 2: Climatebase.ru (extremes)

== Economy ==
The factories of Izium produce optical equipment, mechanical components, concrete products, building materials, and foodstuffs. Other industries include railroad repair, brewing and glass production. A clay deposit and a natural gas field are located in the surrounding area.

== Culture ==
A regional museum functions in the city.

In 2017 Izium housed the Road to the East (Ukrainian: Дорога на Схід) festival of literature and music organized by Serhiy Zhadan. Among guests of the event were Ukrainian authors and artists including Yuriy Andrukhovych and Dmytro Lazutkin. A mural dedicated to John Lennon and a cafe named after Yoko Ono were opened during the festival. The mural survived the following Russian invasion, but suffered some damage, like most of the city.

== Demographics ==
Population census
Year	Pop.	±% p.a.
1860	9,200	—
1884	14,761	+1.99%
1897	24,300	+3.91%
1926	12,000	−2.40%
1989	64,334	+2.70%
2013	51,511	−0.92%
2022	44,979	−1.50%

According to the 2001 Ukrainian census, the native languages of Izium residents were 74.22% Ukrainian, 23.77% Russian, and 2.01% other/undecided. The same census data concluded that over 80% of the city's population were ethnic Ukrainians and roughly 13% were Russians. Other significant minorities were Belarusians and Armenians. The exact ethnic composition was as follows:

Ethnic groups in Izium
	percent
Ukrainians	83.57%
Russians	13.36%
Armenians	0.47%
Belarusians	0.42%
others	0.24%

Deutsche Welle, reporting in 2014, said that most of the people in Izium were ethnic Ukrainians, but the Russian language was the most common language of communication on the streets.

It is the second most populous city in Kharkiv Oblast behind the oblast center Kharkiv.

== Notable people ==
- Serhii Vasylkivsky (1854–1917), artist
- Denys Kulakov (born 1986), footballer

== Twin towns ==
On April 17, 2023, Izium formed a Sister City partnership with Greenwich, Connecticut, USA.

== Gallery ==
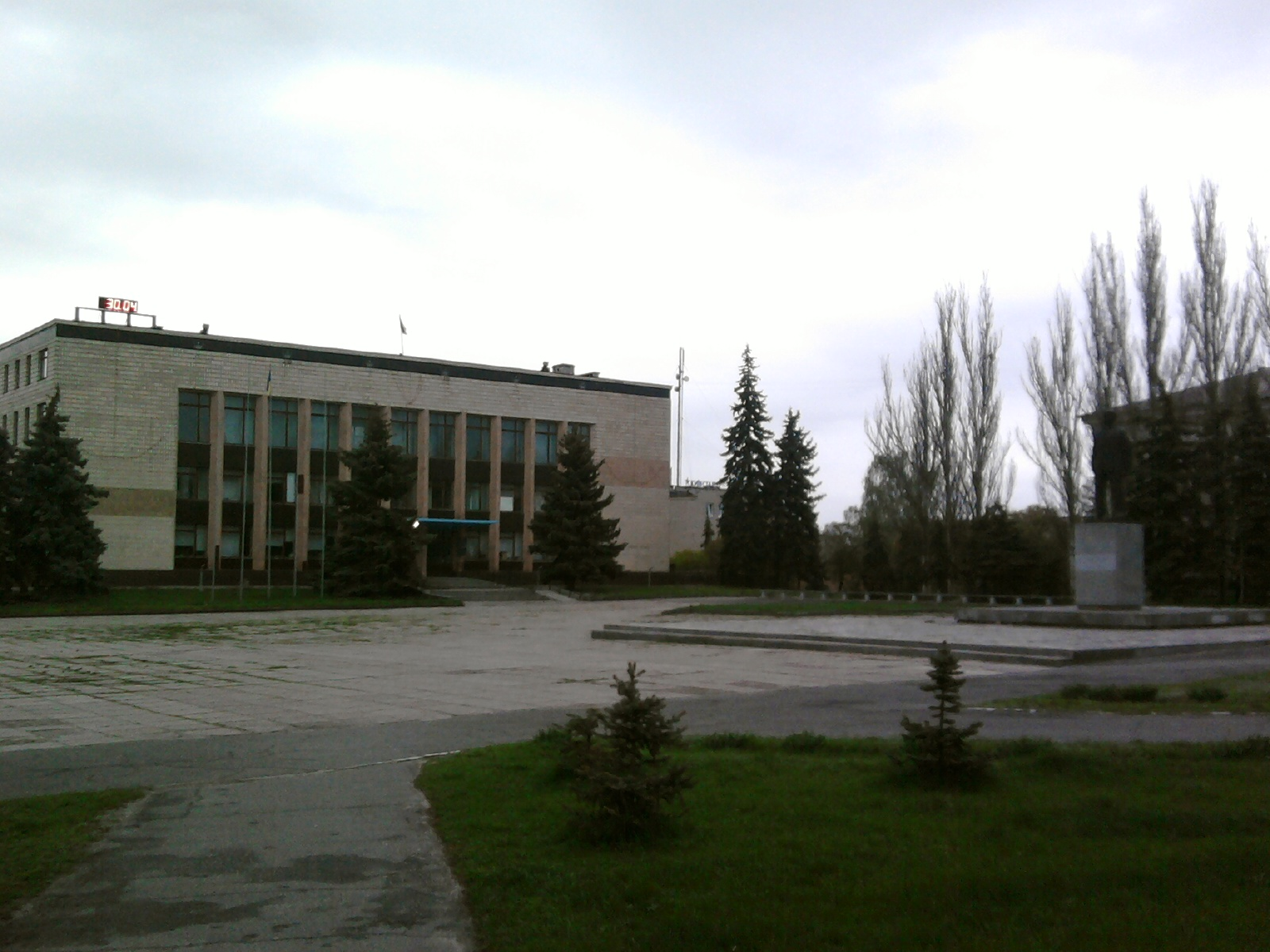
Izium City Hall

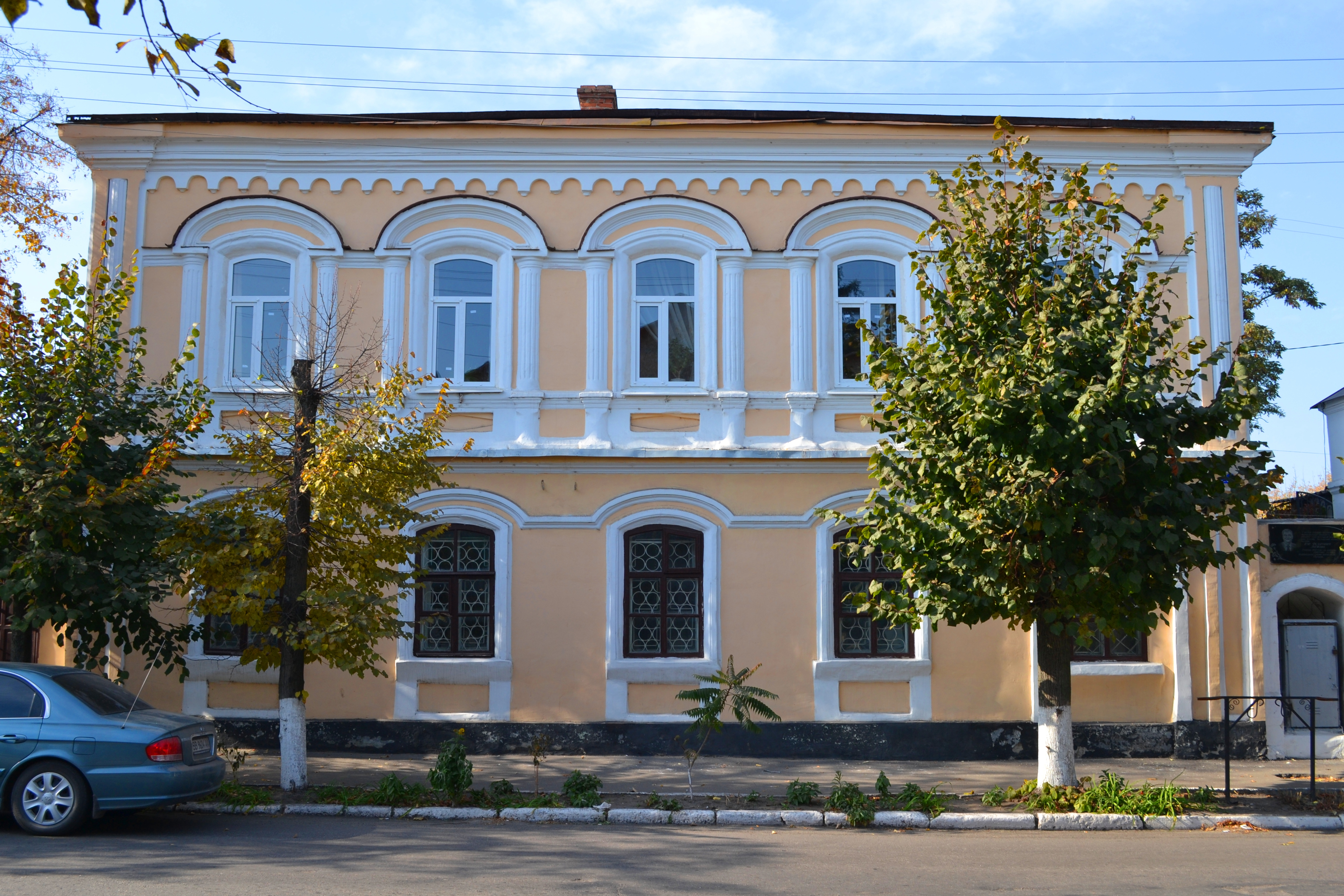
A historical building in Izium

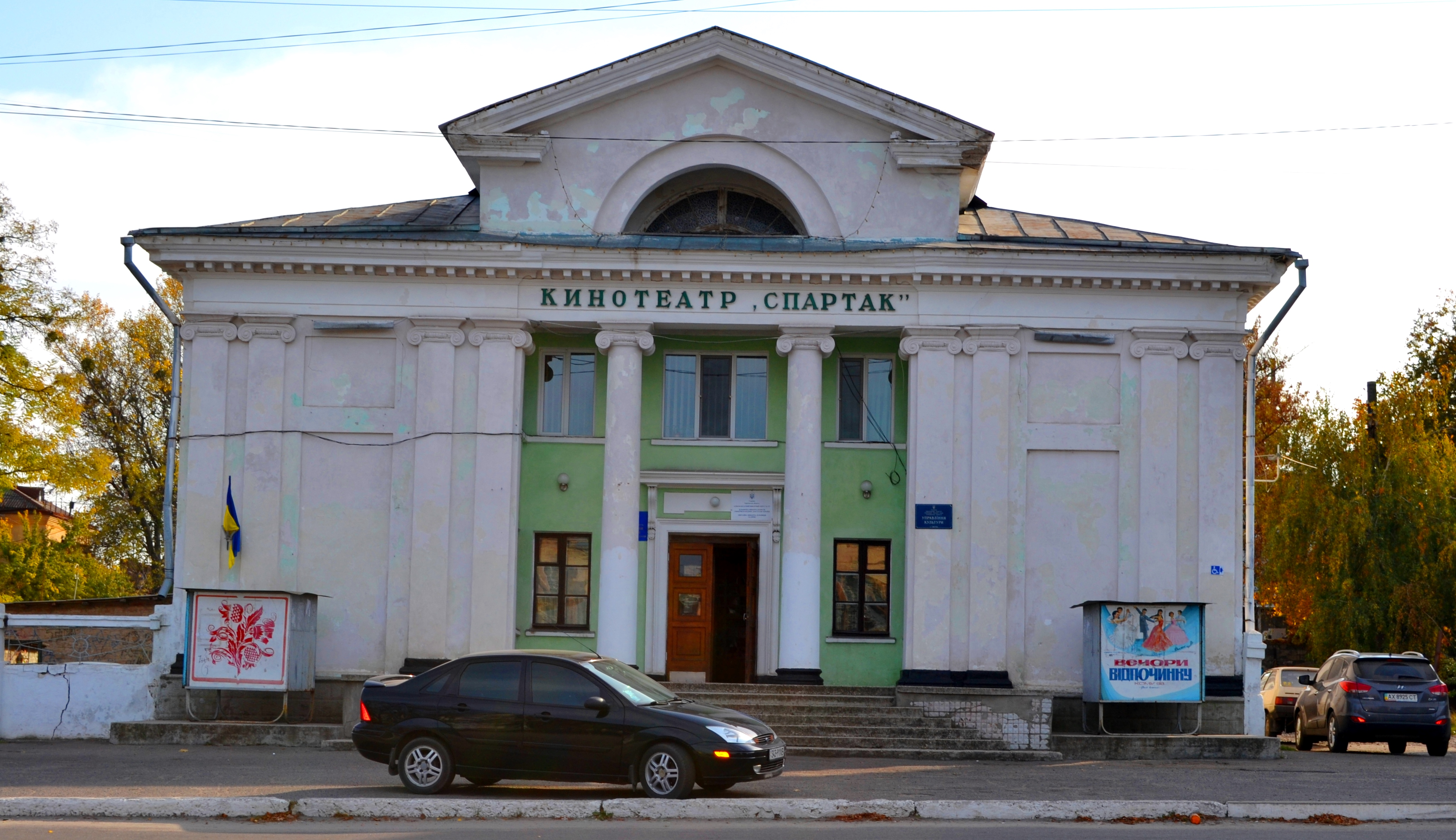
The Spartak cinema

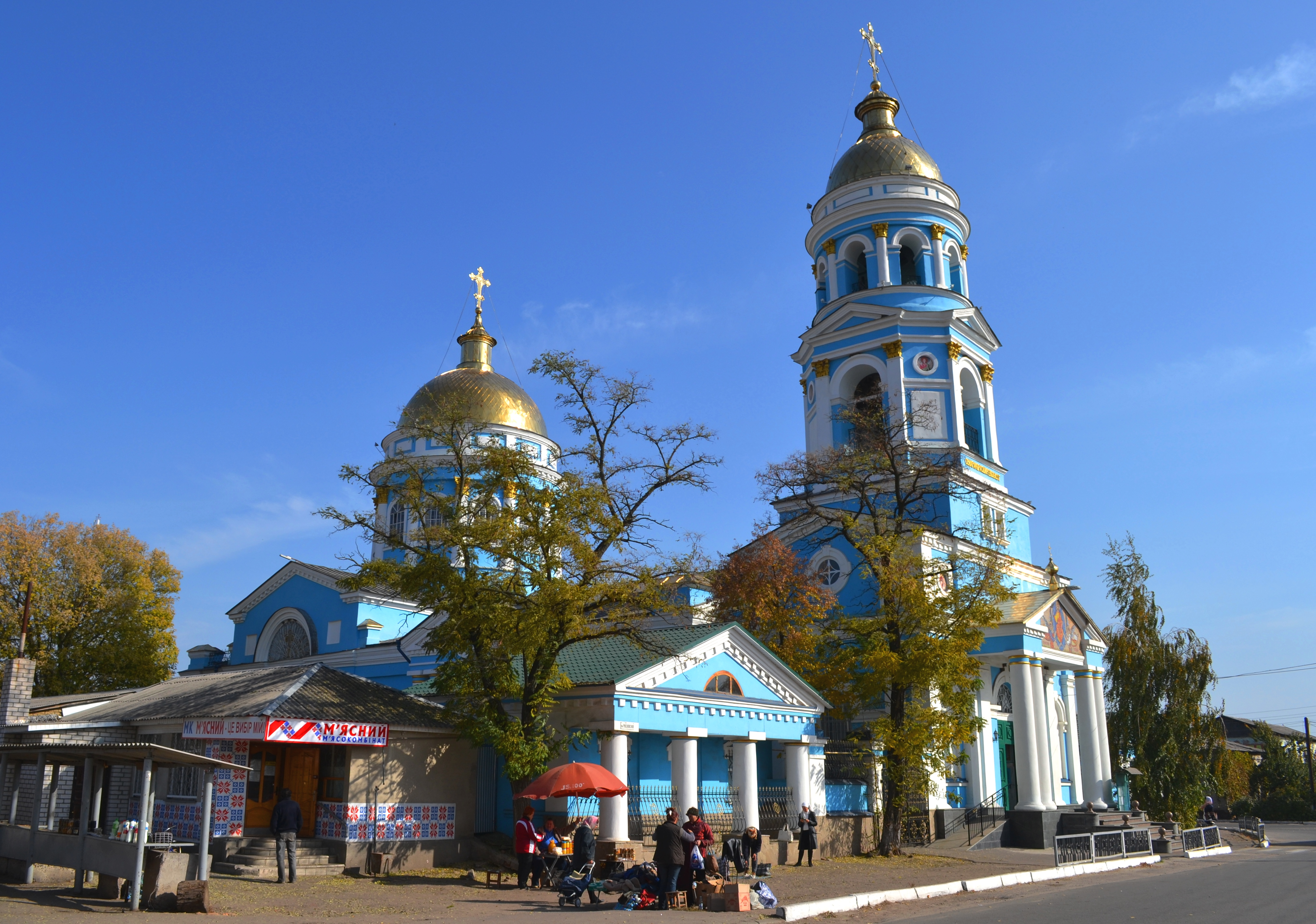
The Ascension Church

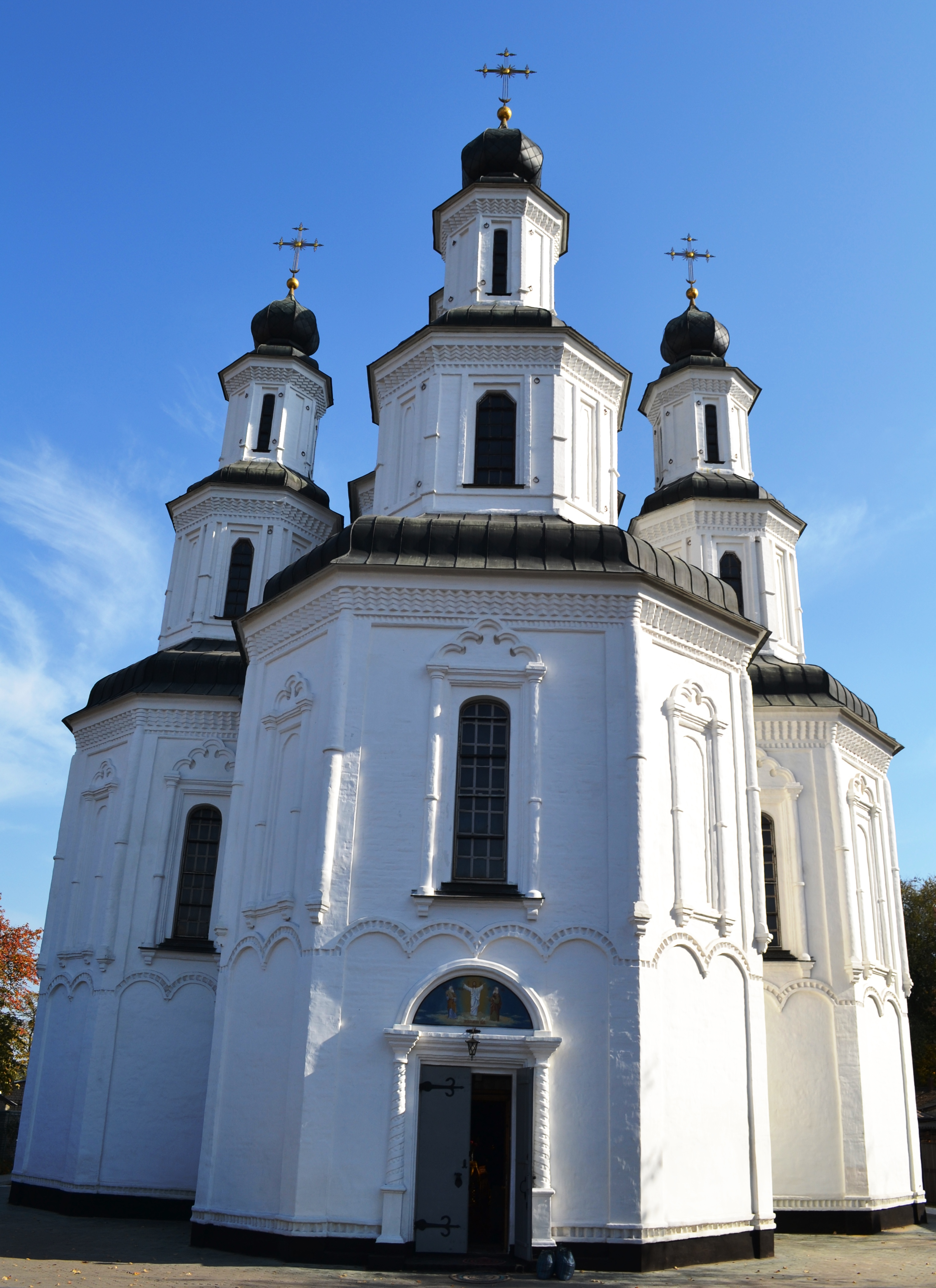
The Transfiguration Church

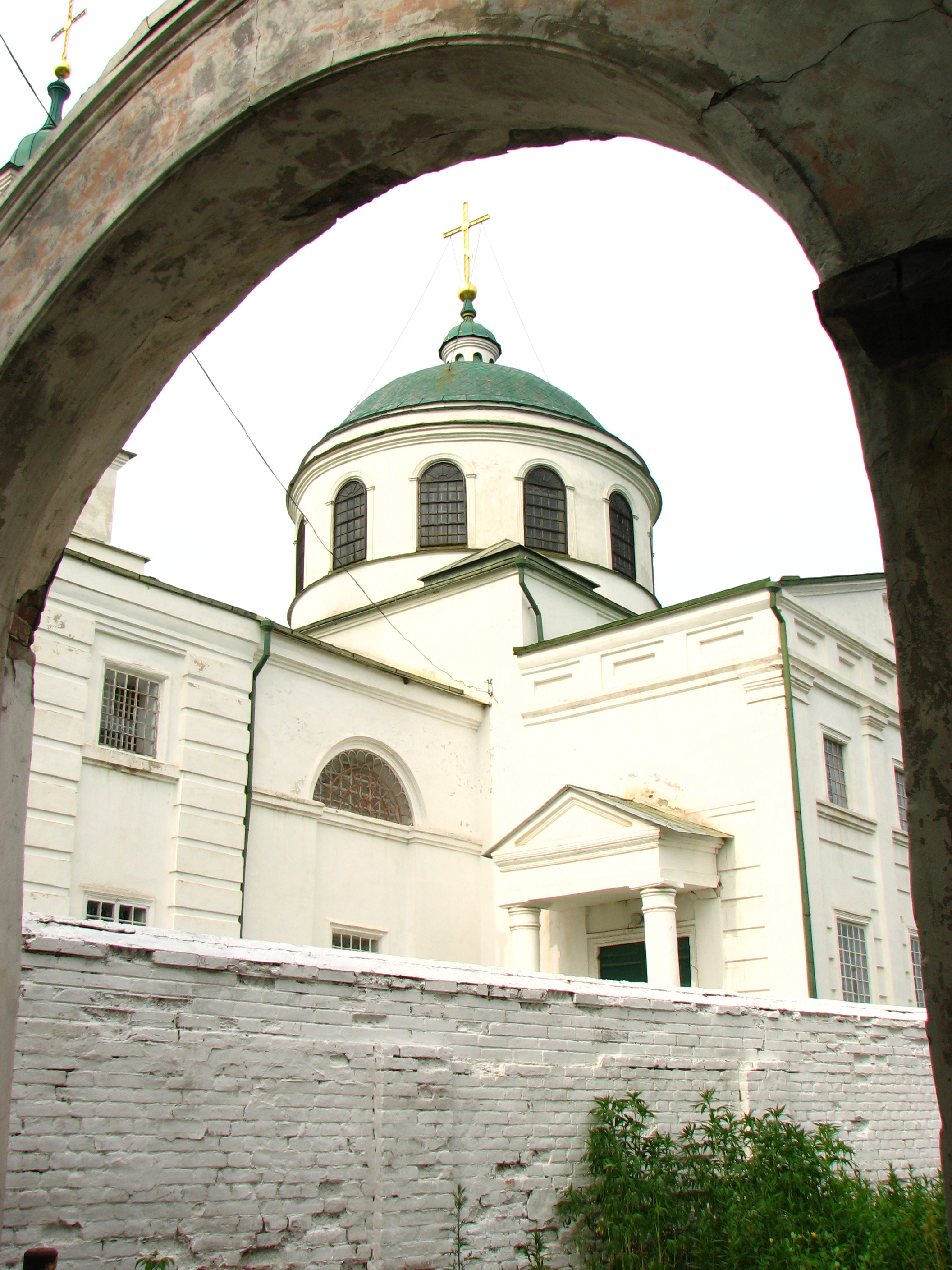
The Holy Cross Church

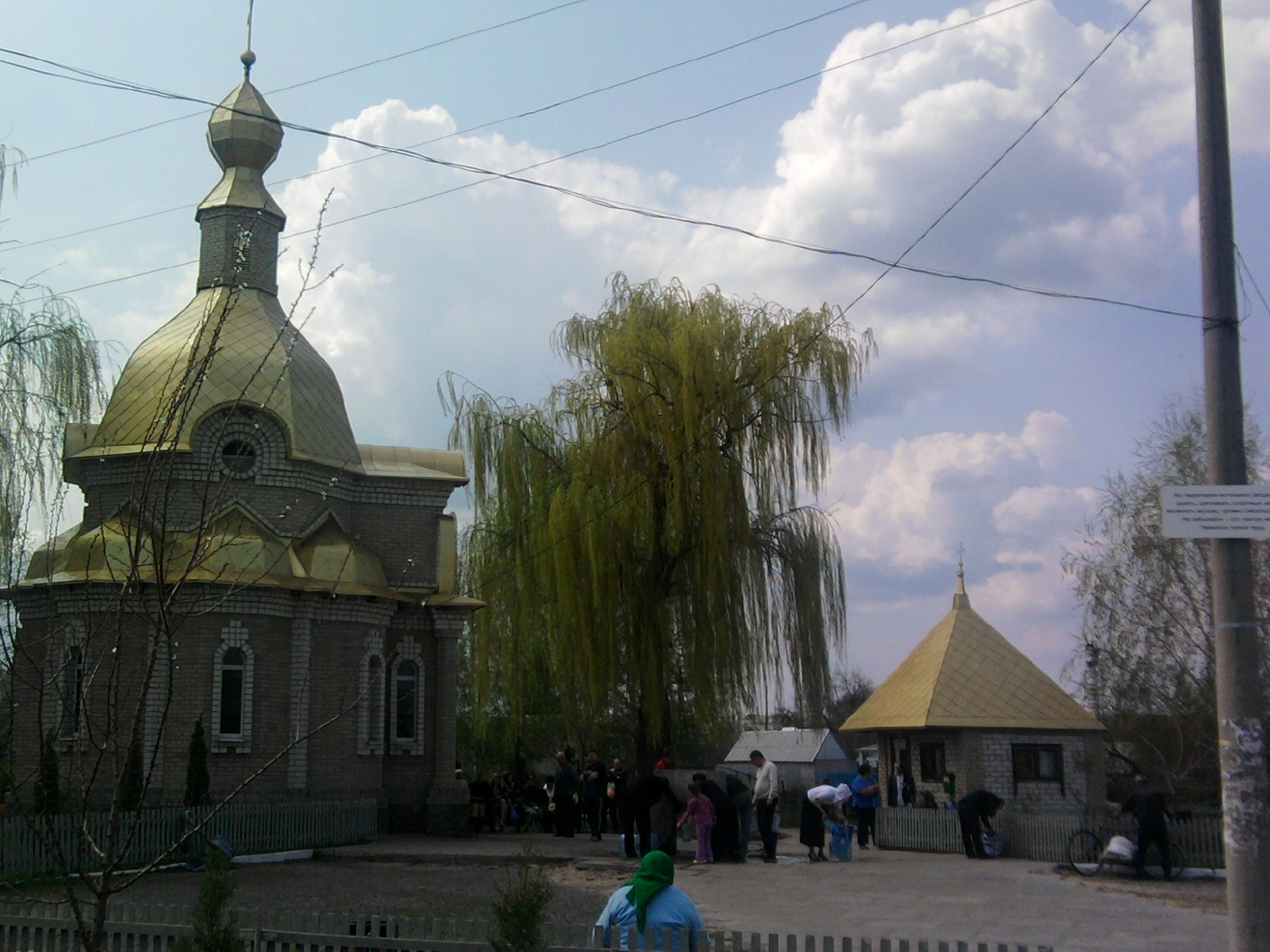
A holy well in Izium

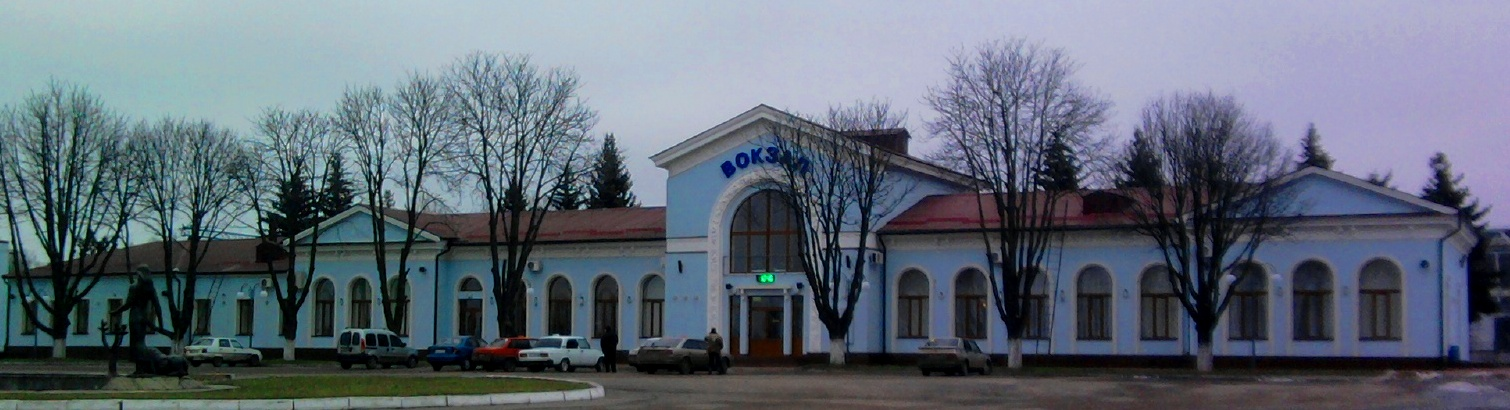
Izium railway station
