= Diana Aster =

Russian vlogger (born 2000)

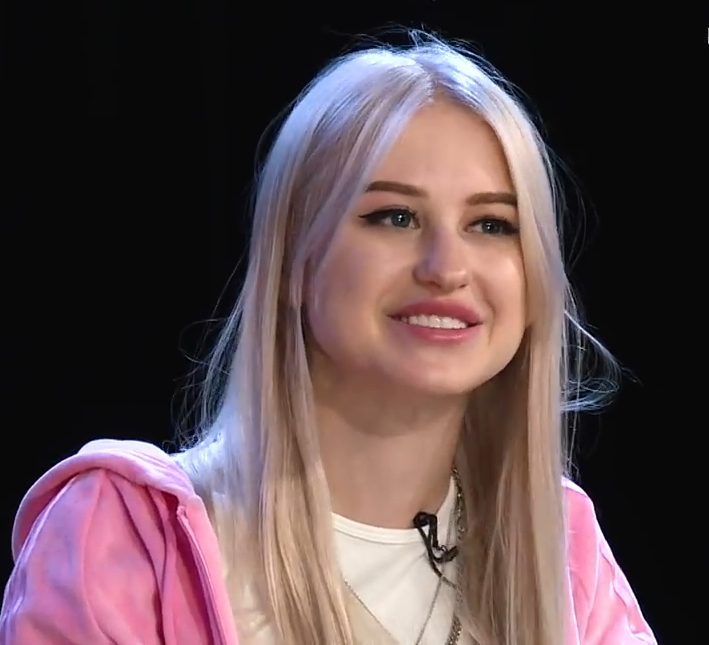
- Born: Diana Dmitrievna Serikova; Диана Дмитриевна Серикова; April 19, 2000 (age 26); Voronezh, Russia
- Occupations: Video blogger; singer; actress
- Years active: 2019–present

Diana Aster (Russian: Диа́на А́стер), real name Diana Dmitrievna Serikova (Russian: Диа́на Дми́триевна Се́рикова; born 19 April 2000, Voronezh) is a Russian vlogger, music singer and actress. In October 2020, the Russian magazine Forbes placed her at number 10 on their first-ever list of the highest paid TikTokers.

== Biography ==
She was born in Voronezh, Russia, on April 19, 2000.

From March 2020 to June 2022, she was a member of the TikTok community (TikTok House) Dream Team House.

External videos
- • «Barbie» на YouTube

== Personal life ==
From July to October 2023, she dated Gleb Viktorov, a soloist from the group "Tri Dna Dozhda."

== Awards and nominations ==
Year	Award	Nomination	Result	Refs.
2020	The TV channel ТНТ Music 2020 results	Best TikToker of the year	Won	
