= Anya Pokrov =

Russian singer and blogger (born 1999)

- Аня Покров
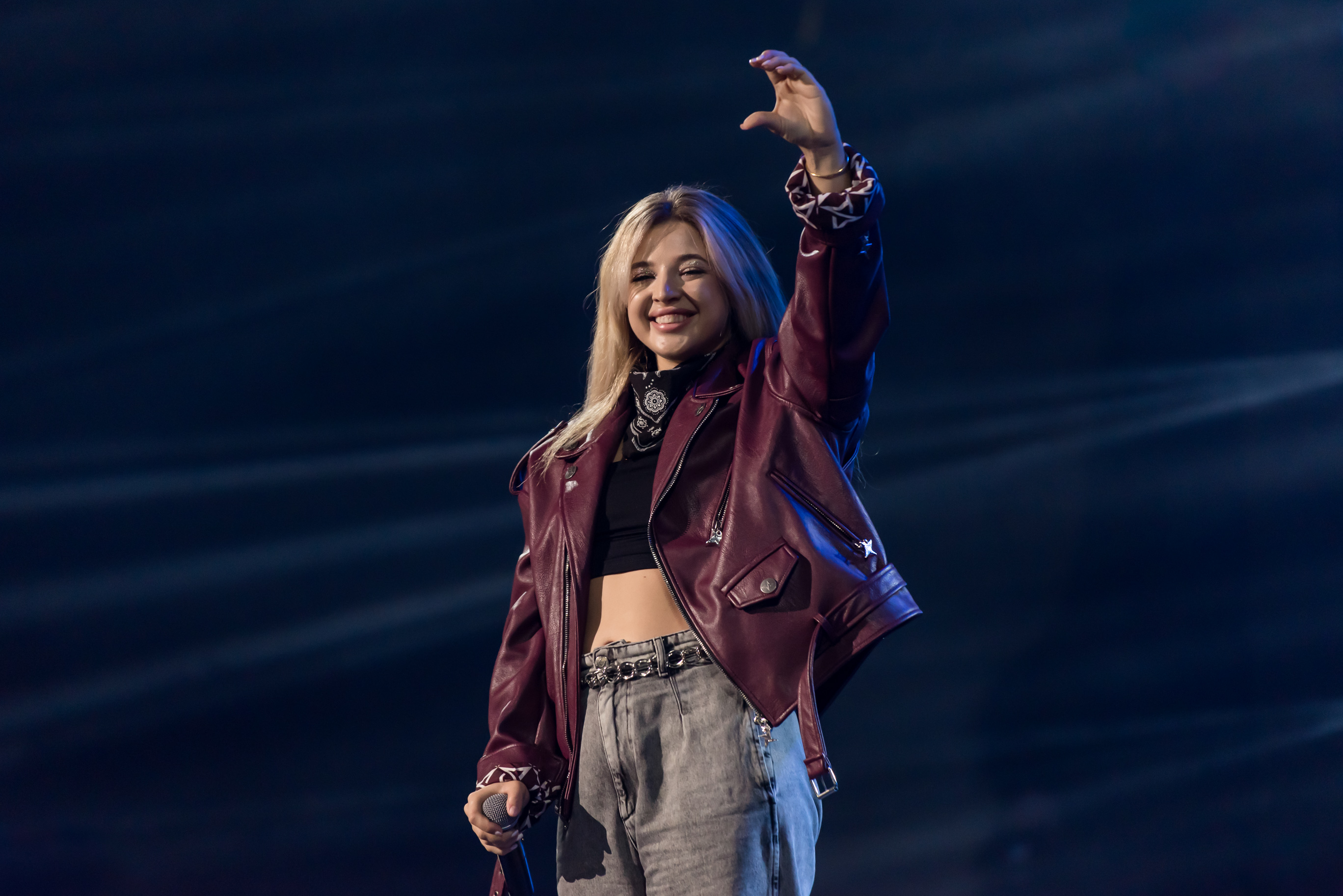
- Born: Anna Aleksandrovna Pokrovskaya; Анна Александровна Покровская; December 15, 1999 (age 26); Volgograd, Russia
- Other names: Avokado; Antigrustin
- Occupations: Video blogger; singer
- Spouse: Artur Babich (m. 2026)

Anya Pokrov (real name Anna Aleksandrovna Babich; Russian: А́нна Алекса́ндровна Ба́бич; at birth Pokrovskaya; Russian: Покро́вская; born 15 December 1999, Volgograd) is a Russian vlogger (TikTok, YouTube) and singer. She is a former and original member of the original TikToker house Dream Team House (from March 2020 to October 2023).

== Biography ==
Pokrov was born on December 15, 1999, in Volgograd.

She studied at a music school, graduating with a background in domra. Since childhood, she loved to dance and was involved in dancing.

In 2022, she lived in the United States and returned to Russia in 2023.

Anna Pokrov also officially changed her surname to Babich on July 30, 2026; her passport name is now Babich, Anna Aleksandrovna.

== Channel topics ==
In May 2020, Pokrov launched a YouTube channel dedicated to news from the world of blogging.

== Discography ==
External videos
- Видеоклипы на «Ютюбе» • «Не игра в Симс» • «Снежинка»

== Ratings ==
- 9th amongst the highest paid TikTokers according to Forbes.
- 3rd place among the Top 20 Fastest-Growing Instagram Bloggers in Russia in 2020.
- 3rd place among the Top 5 Singing Stars on "TikTok".

== Personal life ==
She is married to fellow video blogger Artur Babich. They have been in a relationship since 2020. In May 2025, Babich proposed to Pokrov. On April 6, 2026, the couple got married.

== Awards and nominations ==
Year	Award	Nomination	Nominee(s)	Results	Notes and Refs.
2020	The TV channelТНТ Music's 2020 results	Favorite TikToker of the Year	Anya Pokrov	Nominated	4th place
2021	Nickelodeon Kids’ Choice Awards	Russian viewers' favorite "ship" of the year	Anya Pokrov & Artur Babich	Won	
