= Artur Babich =

Russian-Ukrainian vlogger, singer (born 2000)

Artur Samvelovich Babich
- Артур Самвелович Бабич
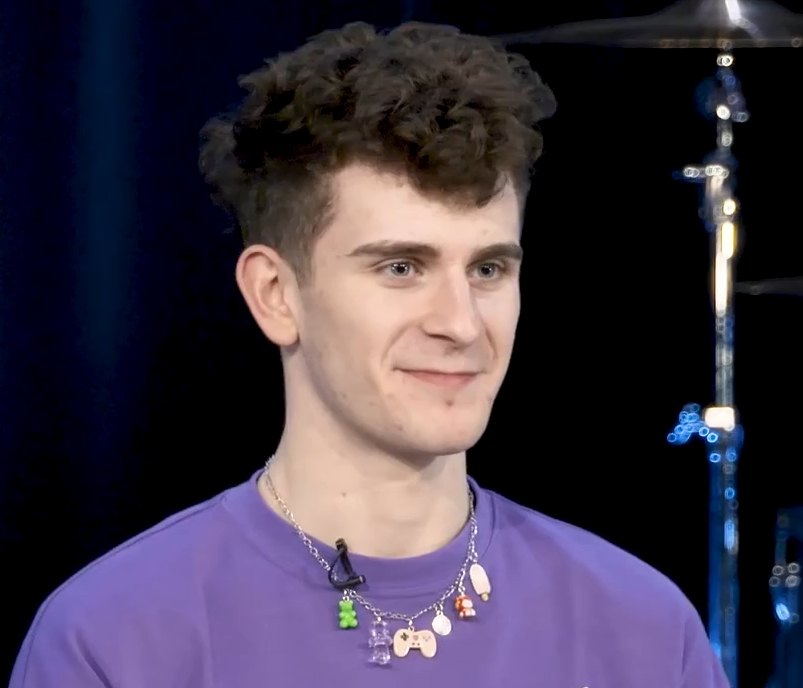
- Born: May 16, 2000 (age 26); Kryvyi Rih, Dnipropetrovsk Oblast, Ukraine
- Citizenship: Ukraine; Russia
- Occupations: Video blogger; singer; voice actor
- Years active: 2018-present
- Spouse: Anya Pokrov (m. 2026)

Artur Samvelovich Babich (Note: Ukrainian: Арту́р Самве́лович Ба́бич) (born 16 May 2000, Kryvyi Rih, Dnipropetrovsk Oblast, Ukraine) is a Ukrainian and Russian TikToker, music singer, and voice actor. He is a former member of the TikTok house Dream Team House (2020–2024).

== Biography and career ==
Babich was invited to the TikToker house Dream Team House founded by Danya Milokhin, and he moved to Moscow.

On October 16, 2020, he released the song "Marmeladka." A few days earlier, he shared a short clip of it on TikTok, so by the time of its official release, 65,000 videos had already been made for the song.

On December 16, 2020, Babich released the New Year's song "Holiday."

In December 2024, Artur Babich returned to Russia, and in December 2025 he received Russian citizenship.

== Personal life ==
Babich is married to fellow vlogger Anya Pokrov. They've been in a relationship since 2020, but only announced it two years later. In May 2025, Babich proposed to Pokrov, and they married on April 6, 2026.

== Scandal ==
In 2022, during a joint stream with Milokhin, they performed the National Anthem of Ukraine together, after which Artur was banned from entering Russia. For this reason, he settled in Armenia, but was able to return to Russia in 2024.

== Ratings ==
- Fastest-Growing Instagram Bloggers of 2020 — 8th Place
- Top 5 Singing TikTok Stars - 5th Place

== Awards and nominations ==
Year	Award	Nomination	Nominee	Results	Notes and refs.
2020	The TV channel ТНТ Music's 2020 results	Favorite TikToker of the year	Babich	Nominated	7th place
2021	Nickelodeon Kids’ Choice Awards	Russian viewers' favorite "ship" of the year	Anya Pokrov & Babich	Won	
