= Valeriy Dolgin =

Russian guitar player, songwriter

Valeriy Dolgin Valeriy Dolgin
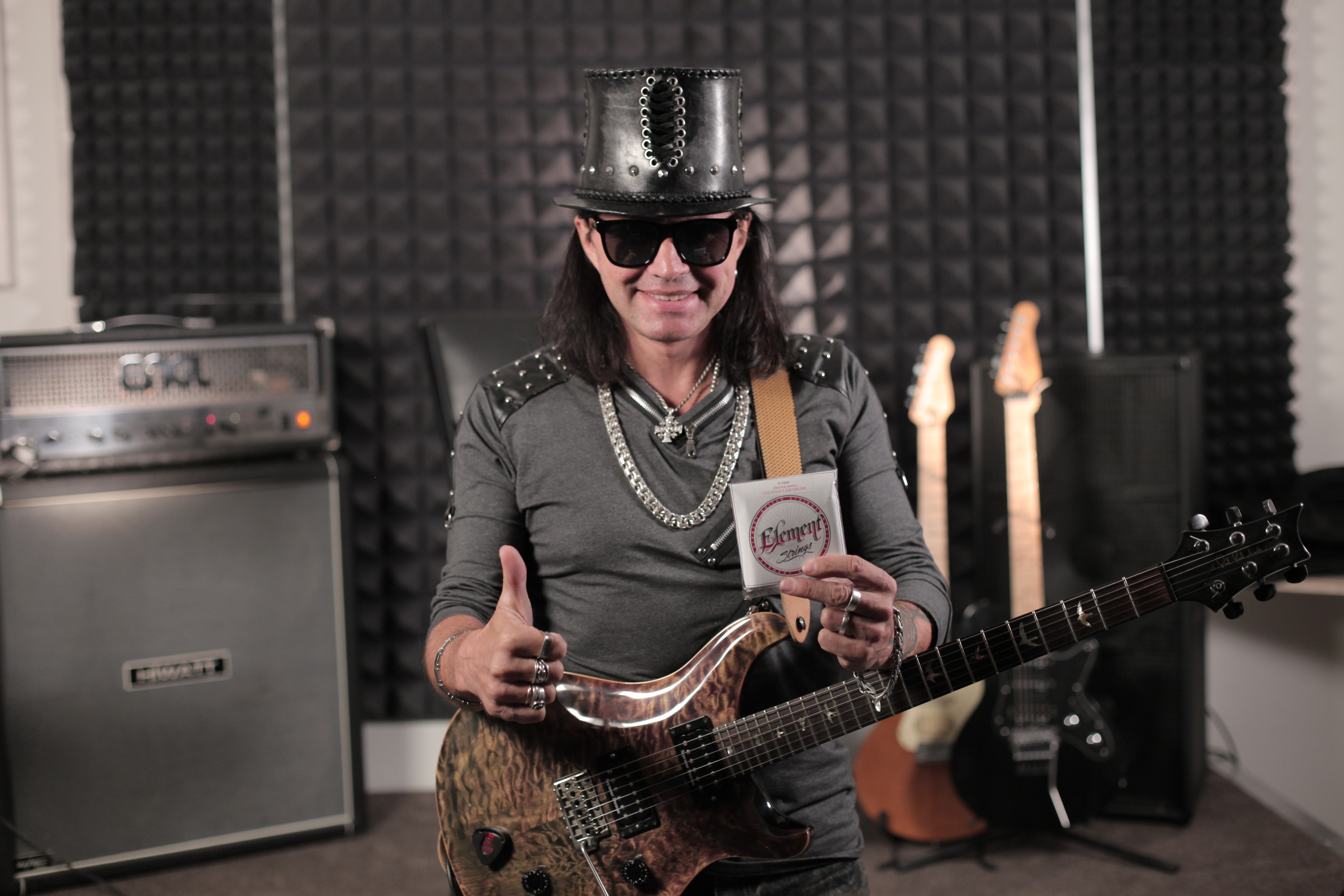

Background information
- Born: March 13, 1964 (age 62); Kamensk-Yralski, Sverdlovskaya Oblast, USSR
- Genres: rock, pop, dance-pop
- Instrument: guitar
- Years active: 1981–present
- Labels: Монолит (from 2006), Kvadro (2002-2006)

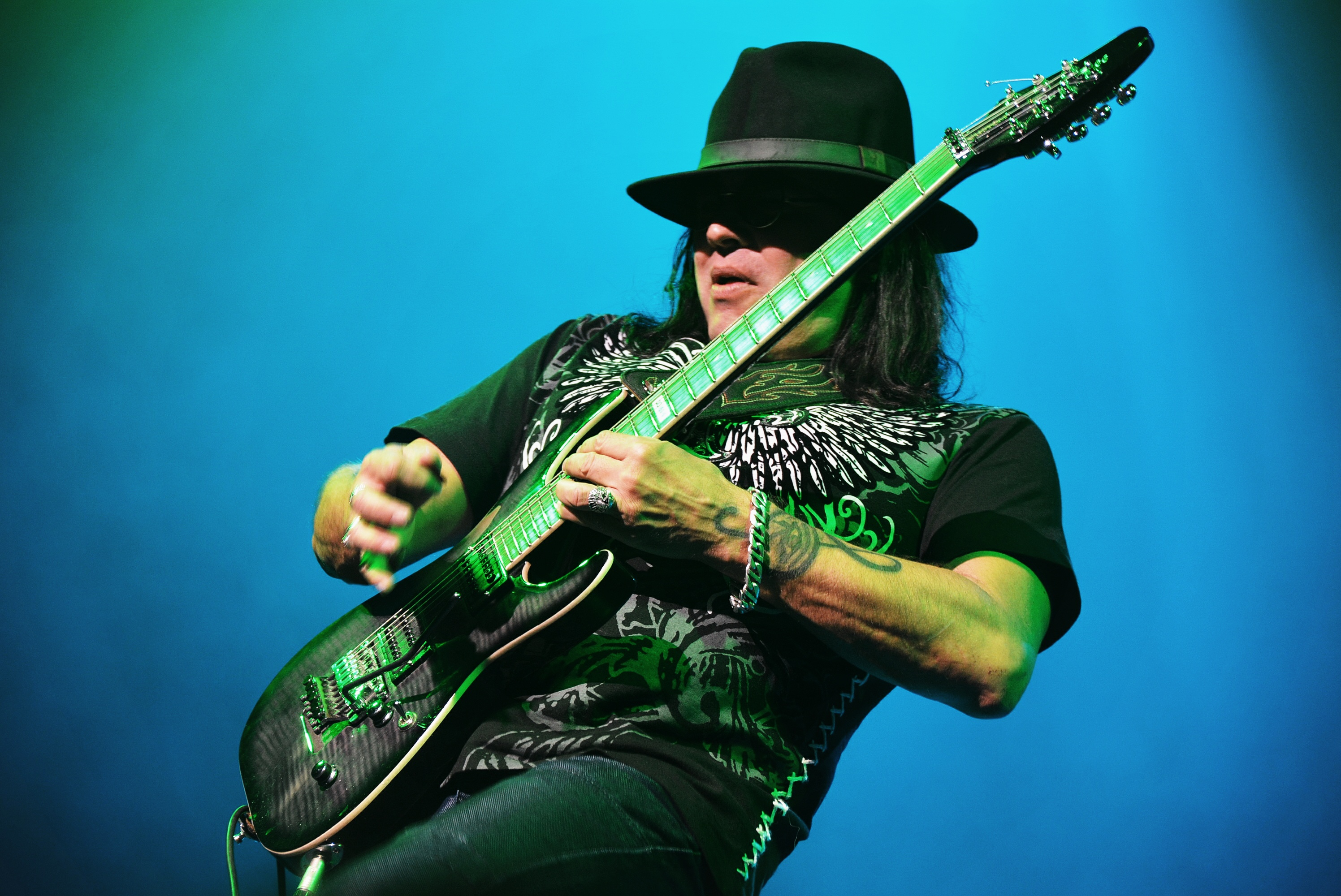

Valeriy Dolgin (born March 13, 1964, Kamensk-Yralski City, Sverdlovskaya Oblast) is a Russian guitar player, songwriter, known for his collaboration with V. Leontiev, V. Presnyakov, L. Dolina as well as for his solo performances and albums. On numerous occasions took part in music score creation for Russian movies (The Turkish Gambit, The Admiral, High Security Vacation) and mini-series (Esenin, Hunt).

== Biography ==
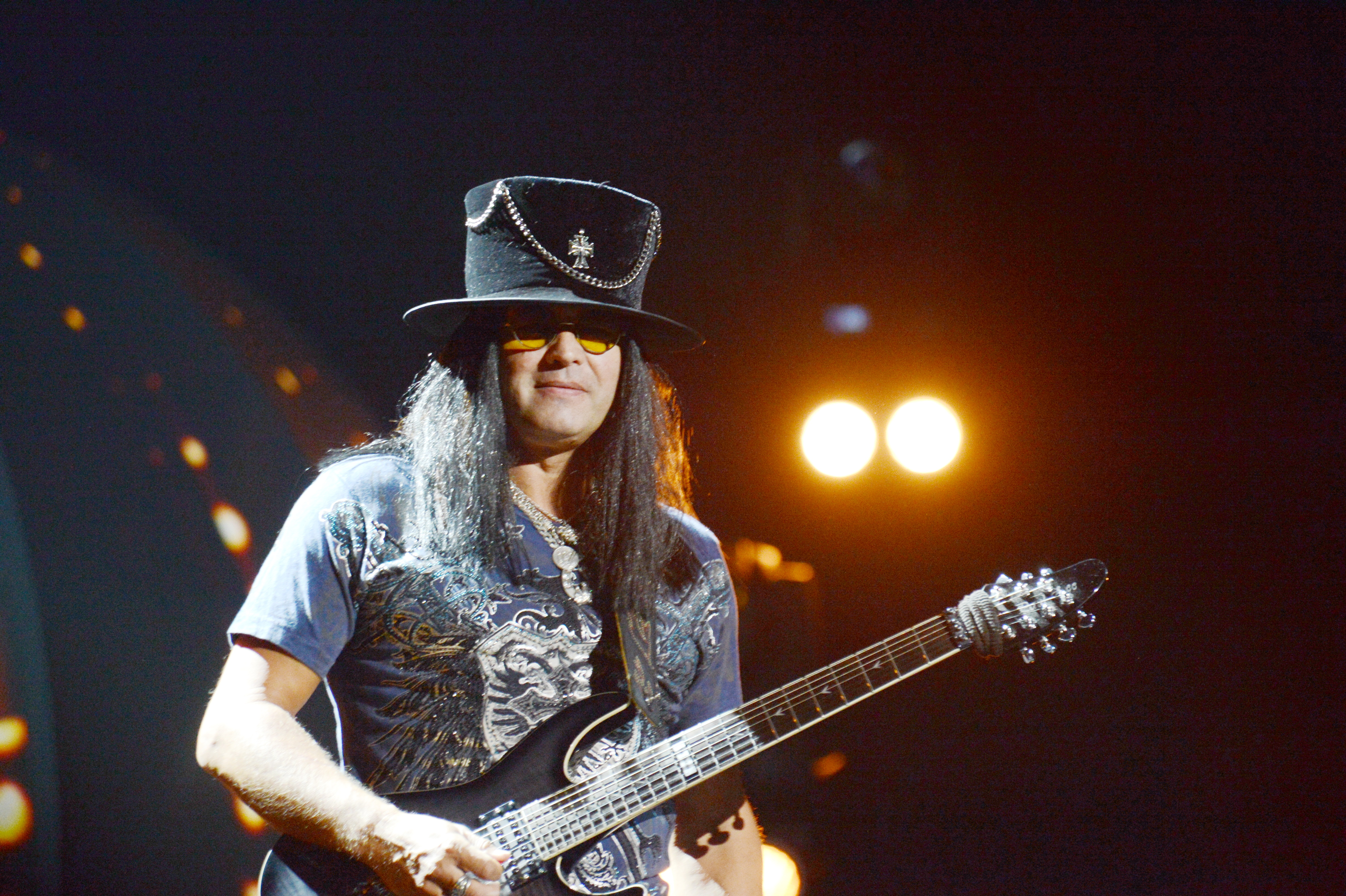

Valeriy Dolgin was born March 13, 1964, in the City of Kamensk-Yralski (Russia). His father was a military officer and his mother played Cello.
In 1981 he began performing in the gypsy band “Djang” formed by a famous violinist Nikolai Eredenko.
In 1987 graduated from Moscow School of Music majoring in classical guitar.
1987-1988 played bass guitar in the musical group “Inguri” (Georgia).
1990-1991 took part in musical group “Formula-2”, began touring with L. Dolina.
1991 became solo guitar player in musical group of Valery Leontiev ”Echo”.
1991 was cast in music videos of V. Leontiev “Night” and “At Heavenly Gate”.
1992 took part in the live recording of “The Land of Love” for the program “Bomond” (In duet with V. Leontiev).
1993-1995 played with famous group, named “MF-3” by Christian Ray.
1995 returned to the permanent position of V. Leontev’s group “Echo”.
1996 performed major solo concerts in the super-show “The One Way to Hollywood” (act the “City of Angels”, “Drunk Taxi”, “Tango of broken hearts”). The show was recognized as the best show of the year in Russia twice (1996, 1997).
1998 recorded almost all of the guitar parts for songs featured in the creative evenings with Igor Krutoy. Also took part in preparation of the same program in 2001, 2004 and 2014.
1999 took part in recording of a famous song by Igor Nikolaev “Five Reasons”, featuring a major solo by Dolgin.
2002 recorded the first solo album “Mascarad”.

== Discography ==
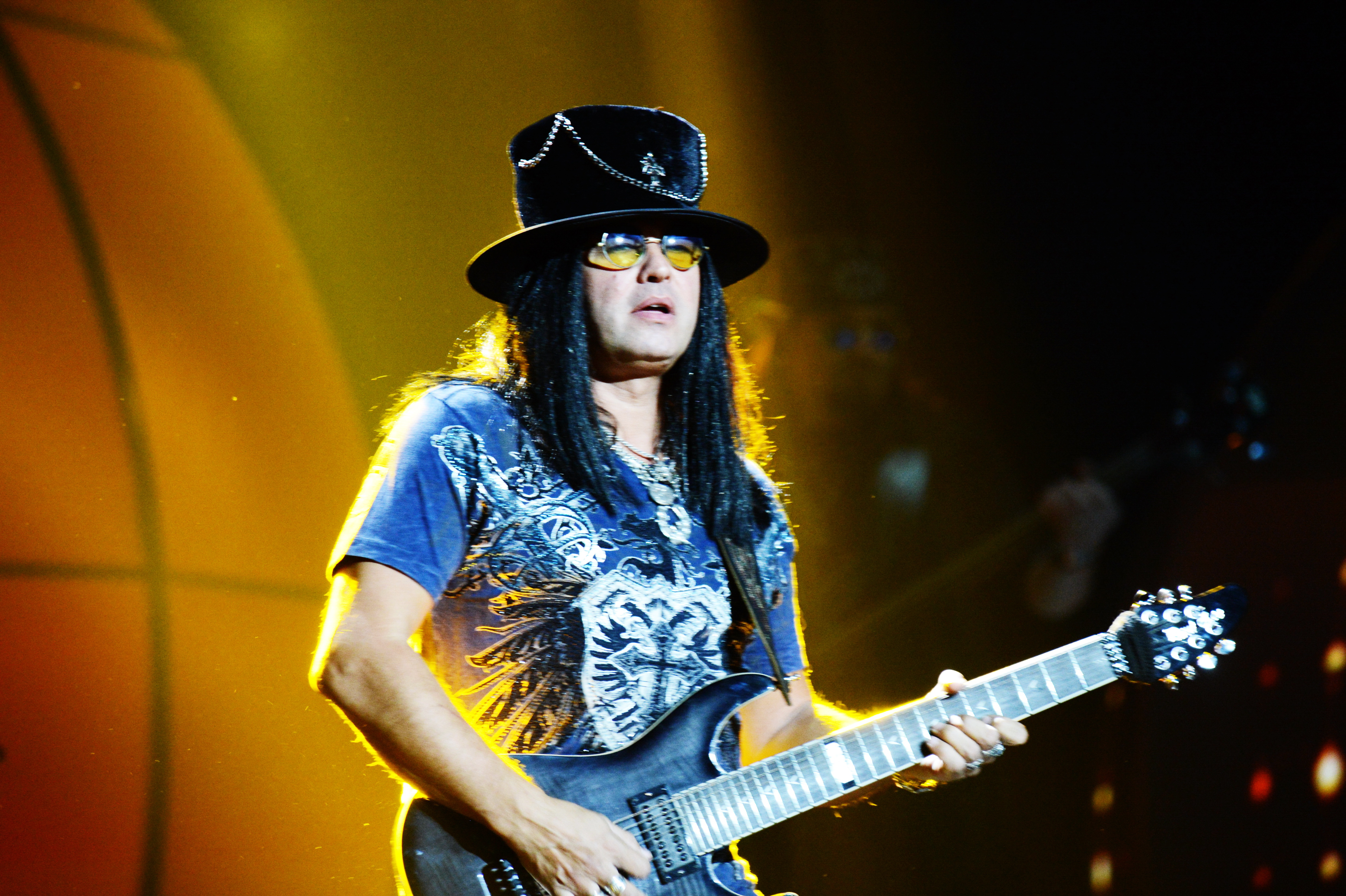

2002 - Mascard (Kvadro Disc)
2002 - Memories (Sploshnoff music)
2004 - Electric Guitar (Kvadro Disc)
2005 - “Cards, Jeans and Romances” (Russian Style)
2006 - “Funtktom” (Monolith Records)

== Participation in other recordings ==
1993 – Full moon. Valery Leontiev (Aprelevka Sound Inc. - Russia; SBI Records, Viennasound Inc., Apex Records – Europe)
2003 – «Pelagic» (FeeLee Records, Russia)
