= Michael Yanis =

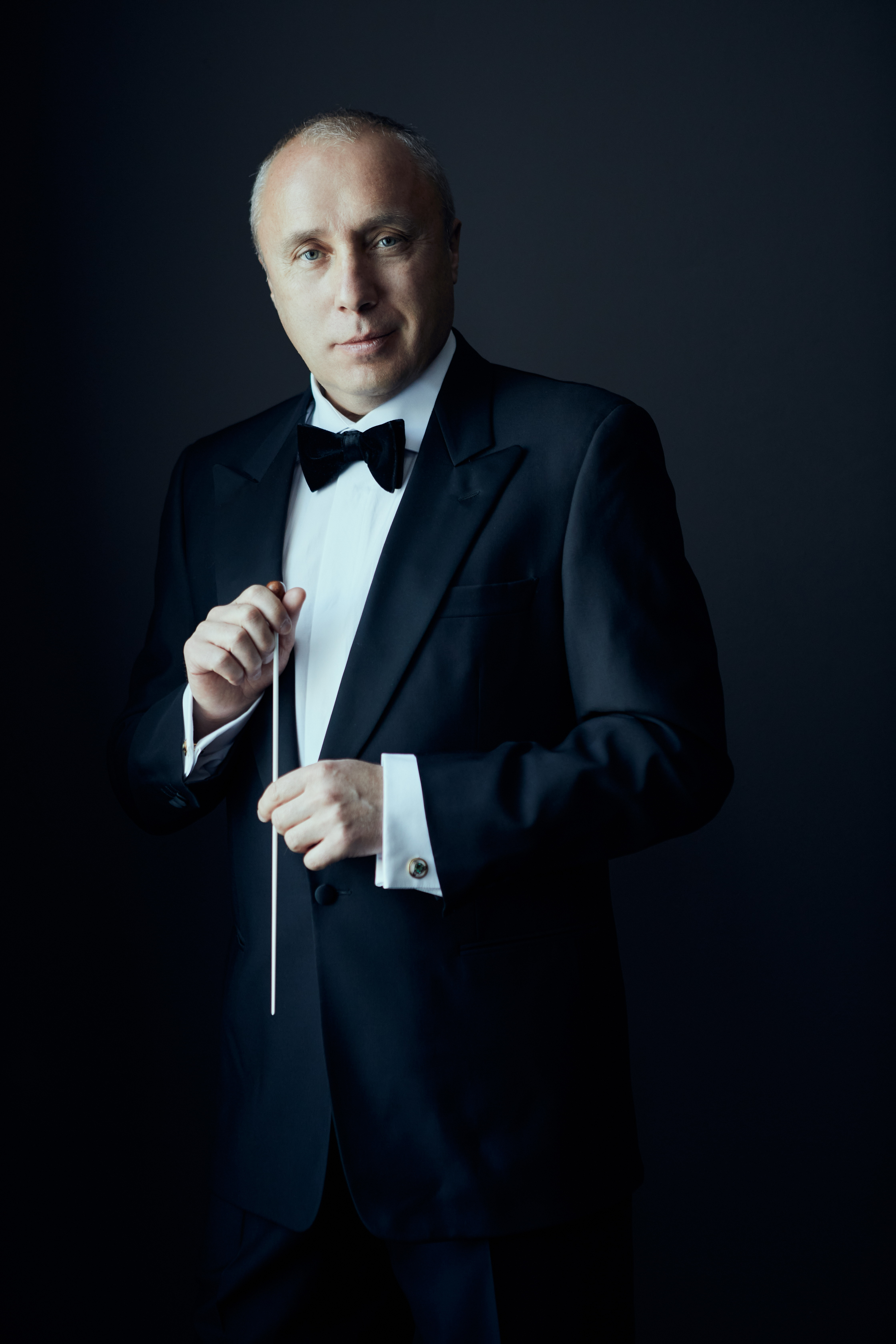

Background information
- Born: 7 February 1972 (age 54); Russia
- Origin: Los Angeles, California, U.S.
- Genres: Neoclassical, contemporary classical, orchestral
- Occupations: Composer, conductor
- Years active: 1990s–present
- Labels: Aemeralds GmbH (Berlin), Kurate / Dreamscape (London)
- Website: https://michaelyanis.com

Michael Yanis (Михаил Янис, born 7 February 1972) is a Los Angeles–based Russian-American composer and conductor. He is known for his participation in the 2014 Olympic Games at Sochi and for collaborations with Olympic figure skating champions. Michael Yanis is also a Voting Member of the Recording Academy (GRAMMYs).

== Early life and education ==
Michael Yanis studied conducting at the Moscow State University of Culture and Arts (MGUKI).

== Career ==
As a young musician, Michael Yanis was a recipient of the Presidential Scholarship of Boris Yeltsin, awarded to outstanding talents in Russia.

In 2014 Yanis took part in the Sochi 2014 Winter Olympics, presenting the project Mark on the Ice. The anthem of the Figure Skating Federation of Russia, composed by Michael Yanis, was performed by French tenor Benjamin Bernheim and Russian pop singer Dima Bilan.

He also collaborated with Russian Kirov ballet legend Farukh Ruzimatov on the project Lord of the Dance

Michael Yanis’s piano compositions such as Piano Dreams, Queen and Blue Notes have been widely performed and shared on social media, with several works reaching viral success on Instagram and TikTok.

== Works ==
- Echo of a Butterfly Album (2025)
- Piano Dreams (2025)
- Waltz of the Stars (2024)
- Rose Waltz (2024)
- Queen (2024)
- Blue Notes (2024)
- Seconds (2024)
- Steps (2024)
- Mark o the Ice (2014)
- Lord of the Dance (2012)
- My Ingushetia (2012)

== Honors ==
- Presidential Scholarship of Boris Yeltsin (1990s)
- People's Artist of the Republic of Ingushetia (2014)
