= Sex and Violence =

Sex and Violence may refer to:

== Music ==
- Sex and Violence (album), a 1992 album by Boogie Down Productions
- Sex and Violence, a 2007 album by Jane Air
- "Sex & Violence", a song by The Exploited from the 1981 album Punks Not Dead
- "Sex and Violence", a song by the Scissor Sisters from their 2010 album Night Work
- "Sex and Violence", a song by the thrash metal band Carnivore from the album Retaliation

== Film and television ==
- The Muppet Show: Sex and Violence, a television special that served as a pilot episode for The Muppet Show
- "Sex and Violence" (Dawson's Creek), a 2003 television episode
- "Sex and Violence" (Supernatural), a 2009 television episode
- "Sex and Violence," a Monty Python's Flying Circus episode
- "Sex and Violence," the fifth episode of Men Behaving Badly
- "Sex and Violence," an unscreened episode of Doomwatch
- "Gender Education", an episode of The Goodies also known as "Sex and Violence"
- Sex & Violence (TV series), by Thom Fitzgerald

== Comics ==
- The Savage Dragon: Sex & Violence, a two-issue miniseries in the Savage Dragon comic book franchise

== See also ==
- Gender and violence
- Sexual violence
- Sex & Violins, a 1995 album by Rednex
