= Jane Air discography =

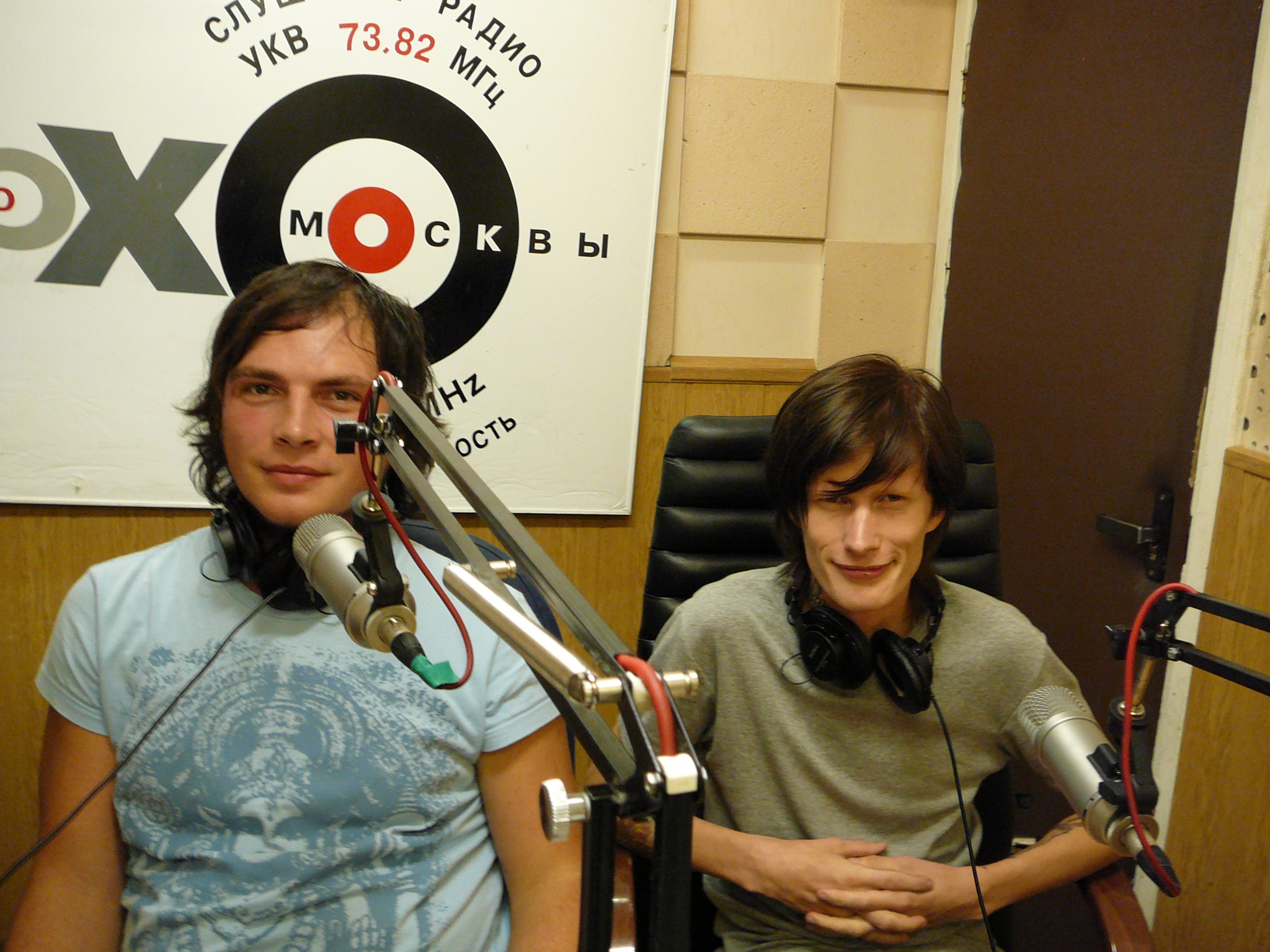
- Studio albums: 6
- EPs: 2
- Singles: 10
- Music videos: 20

The Russian alternative rock band, Jane Air, has released 6 studio albums, 10 singles and 20 music videos.

== Junk ==
"Junk"

Song by Jane Air

from the album Pull Ya? Let It Doll Go!
- Language: Russian
- Released: 2003
- Recorded: 2002
- Genre: Nu metal, Rap metal
- Length: 3:50
- Songwriter: Jane Air
- Producer: Deviant Creations

Junk (also known as Jazz-funk) is a single released by Jane Air in 2003, as well as the eponymous song that first appeared in the album Pull Ya? Let It Doll Go! (2002). The song has music video and movie. The main idea of the song is the harm caused to young people by drug use (presented in satirical form). In 2005 Jane Air was awarded for the song «Junk» with the RAMP prize ("Russian Alternative Music Prize") established by the A-One channel, in the category «Song of the year».

The song was used in the Amazon Prime series The Boys, for the season 3 episode "Glorious Five Year Plan".

=== Music video ===
The video was shot in 2003 and was directed by "Deviant creations". At the beginning a scene plays of a child and his mother, playing with a red ball. It then cuts to Anton Lissov, the leader of the band, playing a drug addict. Also present in the video are two men smoking in a stairwell, portraying nicotine addictions; many people attending a party, portraying the negative effects of drunkenness and alcohol addictions; and a woman infected with AIDS and gonorrhea. During the chorus, all members of the band appear playing in a room and garage. The video ends with Lissov lying motionless in the yard, having died from a drug overdose, while the red ball rolls in front of him.

The video is mixed with live performance at concerts.

=== Track list ===
1. "Junk" (album version) – 3:28
2. "Junk" (video version) – 3:25
3. "Кровь и Молоко" – 3:16
4. "Злое Солнце" – 4:14
5. "Обрывки" (garage version) – 1:47

== Nevesta ==
"Nevesta"

Song by Jane Air

from the album Sex and Violence
- Language: Russian
- Released: 2007
- Recorded: 2006
- Genre: pop punk, emo, horror punk
- Length: 3:30
- Songwriter: Jane Air

Nevesta (The bride) is a song released by Jane Air from the album Sex And Violence released in 2007. The song has a music video.

Lyrics The lyrics were written in 2006. It is a mystical story about dead newlyweds, lying together in the same grave.

Music video The beginning scene is of members of the band drinking champagne in a limousine. The car then delivers them to a large stage outside of Saint Petersburg, where the band begins to play. Meanwhile, hordes zombies and a zombie bride begin to climb out of the ground, and the video ends with the zombies attacking the band.

Other facts During the first 10 seconds, another Jane Air song, "Superzvezda," is playing.

== Lyubit' Lyubov' ==
"Lyubit' Lyubov'"

Single by Jane Air

from the album Lyubit' Lyubov' (EP)
- Language: Russian
- Released: 2011
- Recorded: 2010
- Genre: pop rock, rap-rock, emo, trip hop
- Length: 4:45
- Songwriter: Jane Air

Lyubit' Lyubov' (To Love Love) is a single and EP released by Jane Air in 2011. It includes 3 songs and 1 music video.

=== Music video ===
The video was shot by director "Alexey/MAV/Medyantsev," and presented in 2011. The video depicts a man riding his bicycle in the city. At the four minute mark, he stops at a bridge, and is shown with his eyes covered by a bandage, reading "Любить любовь". At this point, more blindfolded people riding motorcycles appear, following the original man.

=== Track list ===
- 1. ЗВВЗС (ZVVZS)
- 2. Любить Любовь (To love the Love)
- 3. Пламя Огня (The flame of fire)
