= Dream Team House =

Former Russian TikTok House

Dream Team House was a Russian TikTok house. It was founded by bloggers Danya Milokhin, Nikita Levinsky and entrepreneur Yaroslav Andreev. The home began to work in March 2020, and disbanded in 2024.

== History ==
The project officially began on March 3, 2020, when the first video was uploaded to TikTok, outlining what would happen on the account.

In April-October 2023, Yanger, Vlad Levskiy, Ten Yujin, Danya Milokhin, Ira Blanc, and Anya Pokrov announced that they were leaving Dream Team House.

== Team ==
=== Final Members ===
Member	Real name	Country	Birth date	TikTok followers	Years
Artur Babich		Ukraine	May 16, 2000 (age 26)	14.1 mil	2020-2024
Makha Goryachova	Maria Goryachova	Russia	July 5, 1999 (age 27)	10,1 mil	2020-2024
Lianelle	Liana Suleimanova	Ukraine	May 29, 2002 (age 24)	9,1 mil	2021-2024
Michelle Kennelly		Moldova	January 25, 2003 (age 23)	7,5 mil	2022-2024
I'm Katyusha	Ekaterina Tolstopiatova	Russia	January 14, 2003 (age 23)	2,5 mil	2022-2024

=== Former members ===
Member	Real name	Nationality	Birth-date	Year left	Notes
Mimimizhka	Denis Nikulin	Russia	January 12, 2003 (age 23)	2020	Former member, singer
Tenderlybae	Amina Mirzoeva	Russia	May 5, 2002 (age 24)	2020	Former member, singer
Waterfork	Artyom Pimenov	Russia	June 30, 2001 (age 25)	2020	Former member
Pipsses	Ksenia Litvinova	Russia	June 5, 1998 (age 28)	2020	Former member
Karina Manukyan		Armenia	June 22, 1998 (age 28)	2020	Former member
Marina Manukyan		Armenia	June 22, 1998 (age 28)	2020	Former member
Sasha Lygalov	Aleksandr Lygalov	Russia	March 3, 2001 (age 25)	2020	Former member
Vlad Neopoznanni	Vladislav Kochepasov	Russia	July 30, 2000 (age 26)	2020	Former member, singer
NickiGeser	Veronica Gerasimovskaya	Ukraine	April 23, 1999 (age 27)	2020	Former member
Nastya Useeva	Anastasia Useeva	Kazakhstan	May 5, 2001 (age 25)	2020	Former member
Oleg Romanenko	Oleg Romanenko	Russia	July 28, 2000 (age 26)	2021	Former member, singer
Olya Shelby	Olya Shevchenko	Ukraine	December 18, 1998 (age 27)	2021	Former member, singer, actress
Max Klimtok	Maksym Klymchuk	Ukraine	April 4, 2001 (age 25)	2021	Former member, singer
Nik Manager	Nikita Levinsky	Russia	November 3, 2001 (age 24)	2021	Former member, singer
Anya Khakhadetka	Anna Kalashnik	Uzbekistan	September 4, 1997 (age 28)	2021	Former member
Nastya Ryzhik	Anastasia Balashova	Russia	January 15, 2002 (age 24)	2021	Former member, singer
Diana Aster	Diana Serikova	Russia	April 19, 2000 (age 26)	2022	Former member, singer
Vasha Marusya	Maria Lodyanova	Russia	March 10, 2001 (age 25)	2022	Former member, singer
Yanger	Alexey Avdeev	Russia	May 23, 2001 (age 25)	2023	Former member
Vlad Levskiy	Vladislav Mikhailevsky	Russia	January 15, 1998 (age 28)	2023	Former member
Ten Yudzhin	Evgeny Butov	Ukraine	September 30, 1997 (age 28)	2023	Former member
Danya Milokhin	Danila Milokhin	Russia	December 6, 2001 (age 24)	2023	Former member, singer
Anya Pokrov	Anna Pokrovskaya	Russia	December 15, 1999 (age 26)	2023	Former member, singer
Ira Blan	Irina Blan	Russia	January 30, 1993 (age 33)	2023	Former member

== Awards and nominations ==
Year	Award	Nomination	Results
2021	Nickelodeon Kids’ Choice Awards	Favorite blogger's home among Russian viewers	Nominated
2021	Fashion People Awards Teens	TikTok House of the year	Won
2022	Жара Media Awards	Best TikTok House	Won
