= Russian pop =

Russian-language pop music produced either in Russia or other countries

Russian pop music
- Stylistic origins: Traditional pop, Romance, classical music, Bard music, Europop
- Cultural origins: 1950s, USSR

Russian pop music is Russian language pop music produced in Russia, CIS countries, Baltic states, Central Asia and other foreign countries in which the songs are primarily performed in Russian language, languages of the countries of the CIS, and in the other languages of the world. This is the successor to popular "variety" Soviet music with its pop idols such as Alla Pugacheva or Valery Leontiev.

The first hit parade in the USSR was the ZD hit parade. Since the creation of the hit parade to the present day, it has identified the most popular artists, as well as popular albums and singles in Russia and other countries of the former USSR.

Modern-day mainstream Russian-language pop music is very diverse and has many ways to spread through the audience. The most famous pop stars can be seen on general television in music or talk shows, and also on music TV channels such as Music Box, MTV and Muz-TV. So, the Music Box channel presents its prize to popular artists in Russia and the CIS.

In the 1990s and 2000, Alla Pugacheva and Valery Leontyev retained their popularity in Russia and Eastern European countries. Also at this time, Gorky Park, Na Na, Bi-2, Zemfira, Vitas, t.A.T.u., Serebro and others became popular. In 2020, Zivert, Niletto and Danya Milokhin became popular.

== History ==
Since the mid-1970s and 1980s, Russian-language pop music has experienced development. Many musical compositions, such as “Lavender” and “Moon” (Sofia Rotaru), “Million Roses”, “Iceberg” and “Ferryman” (Alla Pugacheva), “I Want Change” (Kino), created during this period, will become signature a card of Soviet and then Russian pop music in the world. Russian music is becoming popular in Eastern Europe, the Baltics, Scandinavia and Central Asia. In 1990, the song “Moscow Calling” by Gorky Park became an international hit.

From the mid-1980s, into the 1990s and 2000s, in addition to Russian performers in Russia, performers from other countries in Europe, Asia and America became popular, including Marylya Rodowicz from Poland, Army of Lovers and Roxette from Sweden, Gloria Gaynor from USA, Ricky Martin from Puerto Rico, In-Grid from Italy, Natalia Oreiro from Uruguay, Dan Balan from Moldova, Patricia Kaas from France, Laima Vaikule from Latvia, Thomas N'evergreen from Denmark, Svetlana Loboda and Verka Serduchka from Ukraine, A-Studio from Kazakhstan, Tarkan from Turkey, Arash from Iran, Avraam Russo from Syria and others. For several years, one of the most popular music programs on Soviet television was the show Melodies and Rhythms of foreign pop, which also showed the best performances from the Sanremo festival in Italy.

== In the Billboard charts ==
Date	Chart	Performer
May 19, 1990	Billboard Hot 100, Billboard 200	Gorky Park
April 27, 2002	Dance Club Songs	PPK
March 15, 2003	Billboard Hot 100, Billboard 200, Pop Songs, Dance Club Songs, Latin Pop Airplay, European Hot 100 Singles, European Albums	t.A.T.u.
May 28, 2011	Uncharted, Next Big Sound	Neoclubber

== See also ==
- ZD Awards
- Ovation
- Top Hit Music Awards
- Slavianski Bazaar in Vitebsk
- Music of Russia
