= Tenderlybae =

Russian singer & vlogger (born 2002)

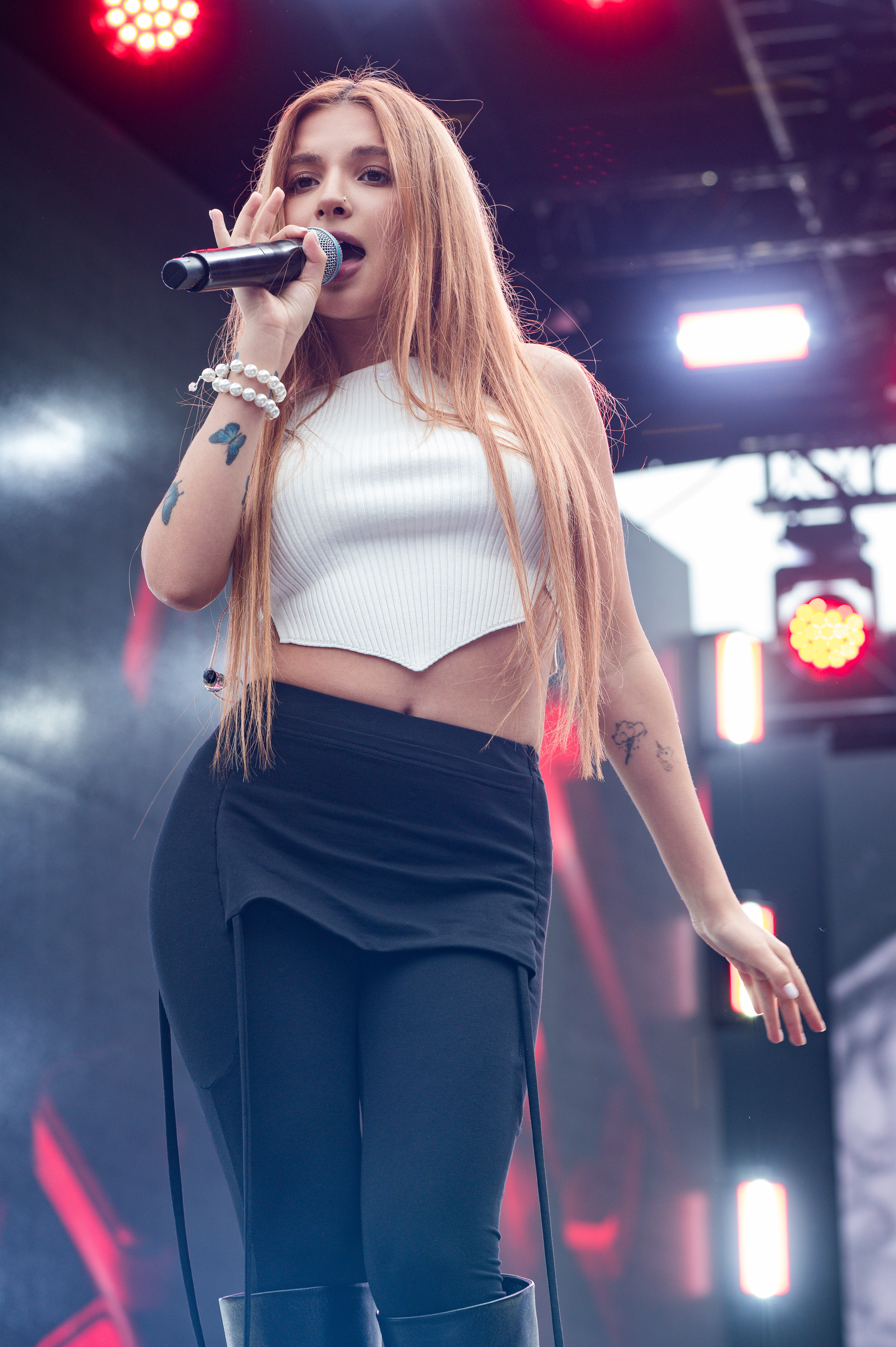
- Tenderlybae in 2025

Background information
- Born: Amina Rashidovna Mirzoeva; 5 May 2002 (age 24); Azerbaijan
- Occupations: Streamer; Singer
- Years active: 2018-present

Amina Rashidovna Mirzoeva (Russian: Ами́на Раши́довна Мирзо́ева; born 5 May 2002, Moscow), better known as Tenderlybae, is a Russian online streamer & singer.

== Biography ==
=== Youth and early years (2002–2018) ===
Amina Mirzoeva was born in Azerbaijan on 5 May 2002. According to Amina herself, she had a strict mother, they did not see each other and did not communicate. She mostly spent her time at home. At the age of 10, Amina began to play computer games, including Warcraft. She was bullied at school because of her nationality.

=== Streaming and singing career (2018–present) ===
At the end of 2018, Amina first gained popularity after performing the song "Аскорбинка" by singer MAYBE BABY. At the time of her popularity, Amina was still in school, where students took pictures of her and uploaded them to the Internet.

In Summer 2019, Amina started studying in order to write her debut album "Юность." The album was released on 1 May 2020.

== Personal life ==
In 2021, she was in a romantic relationship with streamer Nekoglai, but they later broke up because Nekoglai betrayed her.

== Discography ==
=== Album ===
Title	Information
"Юность"	Release: 1 May 2020; Label: DNK Music; Format: digital distribution

=== Singles ===
Year	Title		
Year	Title	2020	"Я урод"
"Не верю" (with Перфе)		2020	
"Не верю (Rock Version)" (with Перфе)		2020	
"Кудрявая няшка" (with Перфе)		2020	
2021	"Летучая мышка"		
2021	"Дружим"		
2021	"Не надо"		
2022	"Антикобыла" (with daybe)		
2022	"Игрушка"		
2022	"Летаю" (with nkeeei)		
2023	"Автограф"		
2023	"Ломай"		
2023	"Выдумал тебя"		
2023	"Пацанский FONK" (with Egor Kreed & Егорик)		

=== Guest artist ===
- Lida — "Грустный реп" (2019)
- MOTELBLVCK — "Что-то не так" (2020)
- Lovv66 — "Всё равно" (2021)
- PINQ — "Дисней" (2023)
- Egor Kreed & Егорик — "Таро" (2023)

=== Music videos ===
- "Грустный реп" (with Lida) (2019)
- "Не верю" (with Перфе) (2020)
- "Кудрявая няшка" (with Перфе) (2021)
- "Дружим" (2022)
- "Антикобыла" (with daybe) (2022)
- "Игрушка" (2022)
- "Ломай" (2023)
- "Таро" (with Egor Kreed & Егорик) (2023)
- "Пацанский FONK" (with Egor Kreed & Егорик) (2023)

== See also ==
- Dream Team House
