= Jane Air =

Russian nu-metal band

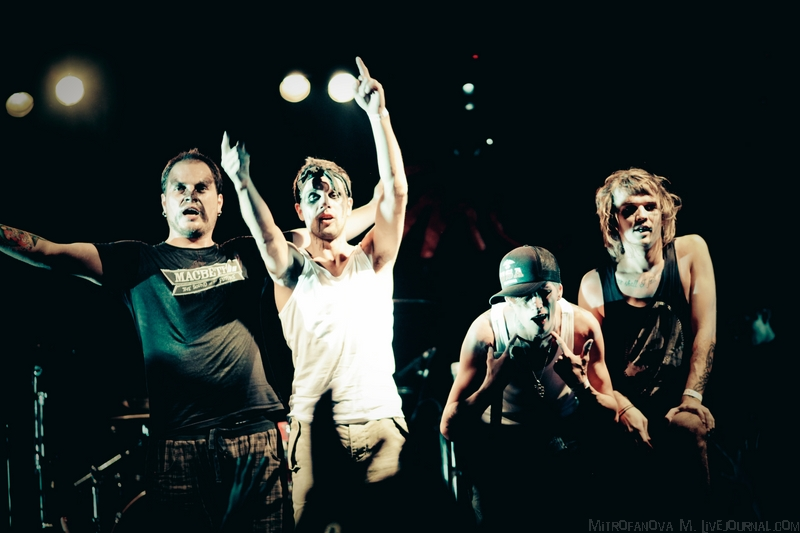

Background information
- Origin: Saint Petersburg, Russia
- Genres: Alternative rock; alternative metal; emo; nu metal
- Years active: 1999–present
- Labels: Kapkan Records, A-One Records
- Website: janeair.ru

Jane Air is a Russian rock band. The band was founded in 1999 in Saint Petersburg. In 2002, Jane Air signed a contract with Kapkan Records and released their first record, Pull Ya? Let It Doll Go!.

After three years on Kapkan they released a second album, Jane Air. The first single was "Junk" (Jazz-funk) from this album was awarded "Song of the year" and received the prize Rock Alternative Music Prize from music channel A-One. The song is featured in the Amazon Prime TV series The Boys (TV series), season 3 episode 4. In 2006, their third album, Pere-Lachaise, was released. The fourth album, Sex and Violence, was released in 2007 on the label A-One Records.

== Members ==
- Anton "Boo!" Lissov – vocals
- Sergey "Gokk" Makarov, – bass, (founder of the group)
- Anton "Toha" Sagachko – drum
- Sergey "Root" Grigoriev – guitar

== Discography ==
=== Albums ===
- 2002 — Pull Ya? Let It Doll Go!
- 2004 — Jane Air
- 2006 — Pere-Lachaise
- 2007 — Sex and Violence
- 2010 — Weekend Warriors
- 2012 — Иллюзия полета (The illusion of flight)

=== Singles ===
- 2004 — Junk
- 2005 — Стёкла Стекла
- 2006 — Nevesta
- 2007 — Новый Год Одна
- 2009 — Моя Стая
- 2009 – Can-Can
- 2009 — Апокалипсис Уже За Тобой
- 2009 — Джульетта (Maxi)
- 2010 — Вечный огонь
- 2011 — Не Забывай Меня
- 2011 — Любить Любовь (EP)
- 2012 — Рычащие искрами тигры
- 2012 — Западный Ветер (EP)

=== Music videos ===
- Junk, 2003
- "Париж", 2004
- "Pere-Lachaise", 2006
- "Джейн в эфире", 2006
- "Суперзвезда", 2006
- "9.80665", 2006
- "Мессалина", 2007
- "Невеста", 2007
- "Новый год одна", 2007
- "Моя стая", 2009
- "Джульетта", 2009
- "Королева Фэйк", 2010
- "Вечный Огонь", 2010 (dedicated to the May, 9)
- "Новый день", 2010
- "Моё сердце сейчас это открытая рана", 2011
- "Не Забывай Меня", 2011 (dedicated to the May, 9)
- "Любить любовь", 2011
- "Рычащие искрами тигры", 2012
- "Звезда Востока и Вечернее Солнце Запада", 2013
- "Сожженный дотла", 2013
