= Gleb Viktorov =

Russian musician (born 1996)

Gleb Viktorov Глеб Викторов

Background information
- Born: Gleb Ostapovich Damba-Khuurak; February 20, 1996 (age 30); Kyzyl, Tuva, Russia
- Genres: Pop rock; Alternative rock; Electronic music
- Occupations: Musician; singer; songwriter; composer; arranger
- Member of: Tri dnya dozhdya

Gleb Ostapovich Viktorov (Russian: Глеб Оста́пович Ви́кторов (at birth: Дамба-Ху́урак; born February 20, 1996, Kyzyl) is a Russian musician, singer, guitarist and beatmaker, who formed the rock-group "Tri dnya dozhdya."

== Biography ==
=== Early years ===
He was born on February 20, 1996, in Kyzyl, Republic of Tuva, in Russia. His mother played the dombra, while his dad was a painter.

== Family and personal life ==
From June to October 2023, Viktorov was in a relationship with blogger Diana Aster; they announced their breakup on social media.

In May 2023, Viktorov declared his love for Russia and Russians and suggested that those dissatisfied with the country's developments leave. He also announced negotiations to hold charity concerts in Donetsk and Luhansk and promised to perform in Crimea.

On July 12, 2026, during a concert in Yekaterinburg, Viktorov delivered a political speech. He spoke about the deaths of his acquaintances in the war, criticized the use of the abbreviation "SVO" instead of the word "war," and called on the audience to vote for the Communist Party of the Russian Federation (CPRF).
