= Tri dnya dozhdya =

Russian rock group

Tri dnya dozhdya Три дня дождя

Background information
- Origin: Kyzyl, Tuva, Russia
- Genres: Rock
- Years active: 2019-present

Tri dnya dozhdya (Russian: «Три дня дождя»), translated to Three Days of Rain, is a Russian rock band, formed by Gleb Viktorov in 2019. Initially, Viktorov's solo project existed under this name; later, the permanent lineup of the group was formed.

== History ==
=== 2019—2021: Start of the project ===
In 2017, Viktorov began making music as a beatmaker under the pseudonym tranqsad. In October 2019, he released the rock single "Autumn and Alcohol" under the new pseudonym "Tri Dnya Dozhdya"; this was originally Viktorov's solo project.

=== 2022–2023: "Bipolar" and suspension of operations ===
On June 4, 2023, during a concert in Yekaterinburg, Viktorov appeared on stage heavily intoxicated and was unable to perform. The following day, IZBA announced the project's indefinite suspension and the cancellation of all scheduled concerts.

=== 2024: Award and joint projects ===
On October 4, 2024, the band, together with Tosya Chaikina, released a cover version of the song "Zemlya" by Masha i Medvedi. The song was included in the soundtrack for the TV series "Amur."

== Critical reception ==
In 2024, Afisha Daily named Tri Dnya Dozhdya one of the most notable rock projects of the Russian-language scene of the early 2020s, attributing its popularity to its unsettling guitar music and songs about personal relationships. The publication described the album Melancholia as the band's most personal and mature work to date.

== Discography ==
Studio Albums

- «Любовь, аддикция и марафоны» (2020)
- «Когда ты откроешь глаза» (2021)
- «Байполар» (2022)
- Melancholia (2023)
- «Висхолдинг» (2025)
