= Christian Ray Flores =

Chilean-Russian entrepreneur (born 1969)

- Born: March 15, 1969 (age 57); Moscow, Russia
- Occupations: Entrepreneur, Evangelist, Philanthropist, Investor, Coach

Christian Ray Flores (born March 15, 1969) is an American artist, entrepreneur, evangelist, philanthropist, investor and coach.

== Early life ==
Christian Ray Flores was born in Moscow, Russia, on March 15, 1969, to a Chilean father and a Russian mother. The family moved to Chile when Christian was nine months old.

During the 1973 military coup of Augusto Pinochet, Christian's father, Americo Flores, was arrested along with thousands of others and spent time in one of the infamous concentration camps. His mother Larisa and two children went into hiding under an assumed name and with a fake Argentinian passport. After Americo's release, the family spent some time in a UN refugee camp and was granted asylum in Germany, moving to Munich. After living in Germany and Russia, Americo and Larisa moved to Mozambique, at the government's invitation, which was recruiting international professionals after a mass exodus of Portuguese upon the nation's independence. Christian learned four languages by age nine: Russian, Spanish, English, and Portuguese. After his parents' divorce, Christian returned to Russia with his mother and sister in 1983. Christian got a master's degree in economics in 1991 from the RUDN University in Moscow.

== Music career ==
In 1993, Christian released his first single in Russia and became an instant success, winning awards like Generation ‘93 and Ovation in 1996 and playing nationwide. Back-to-back top-ten hits culminated in his number-one single, "Our Generation" – an anthem of freedom and change. It became a song widely used as the anthem of Boris Yeltsin's election campaign. Christian campaigned for Yeltsin as part of the Russian version of Rock The Vote, credited to giving Yeltsin the youth vote and victory in the campaign. Christian, together with his co-producers, Andrey Grozny and Andrey Shlykov, produced several other musical projects including a "girl band" called Blestyashchiye, which has had a more than 20-year run and generated several of the biggest female solo careers in Russia.

== Career in the United States ==
After moving to the US in 2004, Christian worked for the international charity HOPE Worldwide, serving as a country director for Latin America, focusing on health care and education in nine countries. He also developed and directed the Positive Choice education program, implemented around the US and internationally in Mexico, Jamaica, Indonesia.

Christian co-founded a production company, Hollywood World, in Los Angeles with his wife, Deb de Flores. Hollywood World allowed international artists to work with top Hollywood producers and directors. Among other projects, Christian did voice acting for the English and Spanish versions of Masha and the Bear, a popular animated TV series.

After moving to Austin, Texas, Christian and Deb co-founded (with Brandon Knicely) Third Drive, raising millions of dollars for startups and creating digital media projects for emerging businesses, public personalities and non-profit organizations.

Christian speaks to audiences in the US and internationally, hosts the Headspace with Christian Ray Flores podcast and YouTube Channel dedicated to success in career and calling Headapace newsletter. His short film Dance With Me was selected to several international film festivals, and its title song was released on all major music platforms.

In the first days of the war in Ukraine, the Ascend Mission Fund launched the Ukraine Relief Network, serving refugees in Ukraine. Christian and Deb personally visited Ukraine in September 2022.

In 2022, Christian and Deb launched the Xponential career coaching program for high-achievers. Xponential

== Family and Faith ==
Christian married Deb de Flores in 1999. They met during a Christian conference for entertainers in Los Angeles, where Deb was living at the time as she worked for MTV, Universal Studios, and VH1, as well as serving in Christian ministry.

Christian Ray and Deb have three daughters: Diana, Violetta, and Isabella.

Christian and Deb have been active in Christian ministry in the US, Eastern Europe, and Latin America for two decades. They lead The Tribe, a community of faith in Austin, Texas. Ray frequently speaks to different audiences in the US and overseas. They are also active in philanthropy through their charity Ascend Mission Fund and projects like the Ascend Academy in Mozambique that lifts children out of poverty through developing character, communication, and computer skills.
