= Neoclubber =

Russian electropop duo

- Origin: Moscow, Russia
- Genres: Dance, pop, electropop
- Years active: 2008–present
- Label: Neoclubber Records
- Members: Serge Novikov; Marina Cherniavskaja
- Website: www.neoclubber.com

Neoclubber is a Russian electropop duo that was organized in late 2008. Neoclubber is one of few Russian dance-pop projects which have released music abroad.

The music can be described as a weave of electronic genres, with an integration of urban and rock elements. However the central genre in which the duo prefers to work is pop.

== History ==
=== Songwriting contests ===
Track “Another World” participating in the International Songwriting Contest (ISC 2008) entered the top twenty songs of the competition according to the opinions of rather a competent jury (Rob Thomas, Chaka Khan, Jerry Lee Lewis, Tiesto, Tom Waits and others).

=== Radio ===
The songs of the project were included in the playlists of the numerous radio stations of the world. In the summer of 2009 the song «In the Shack» hit the TOP 10 of the biggest Turkish radios, such as Metro FM, Radyo Mydonose, Radyo5, RadyoVizyon and others. «In the Shack» was released in a number of bestselling collections (Metro FM Dance Hits, etc.). Being a Russian project, Neoclubber don't forget about native listeners and from time to time release some of their songs in Russian. The song under the name «Chto so mnoj» (original - «Don't Believe») was a debut of Neoclubber in Russia. It immediately entered into manifold charts of local radio stations. The following track «Noch» («Night») at once became a summer hit in several countries of Baltic and CIS. In Lithuania «Noch» got a title of «the best song of 2009» in Russkoje Radio Baltia. A New Year of 2010 began with a song called «Zagadaj Zhelanie» («Make a wish») which attracted an attention of a great number of radios. The result of those rotations was the 12th position in the Christmas Tophit chart.

=== Internet ===
Neoclubber started as an online project and, to date, has gained a hundred thousand listeners and millions of song plays, downloads and views. Nowadays, Neoclubber maintains a web presence and allows listeners to download the band's latest songs for free.

=== Cover versions ===
16 feb 2012 Neoclubber released a cover version of Katy Perry's "Part of Me". This cover quickly attracted enormous interest and earned the Bronze Trend YouTube status with more than 1,500,000 views in just one week.

24 apr 2012 Neoclubber released a cover version of Maroon 5's "Payphone". This cover also attracted interest of 4M people and music magazines such as PopCrush.

== Releases ==
Albums
| Release | Title |
|---|---|
| 2008 | Uplifting |
| 2009 | In The Shack: Night |
| 2011 | Pozitivizer |

Singles
| Release | Title |
|---|---|
| 2010 | Call It Love |
| 2010 | Feel The Vibe |
| 2010 | I Will Say |
| 2010 | Na Na Nah |
| 2011 | Live Fantasy |
| 2012 | Illusions |
| 2012 | Hear Me Cry |
