= FON MUSIC =

Russian television channel

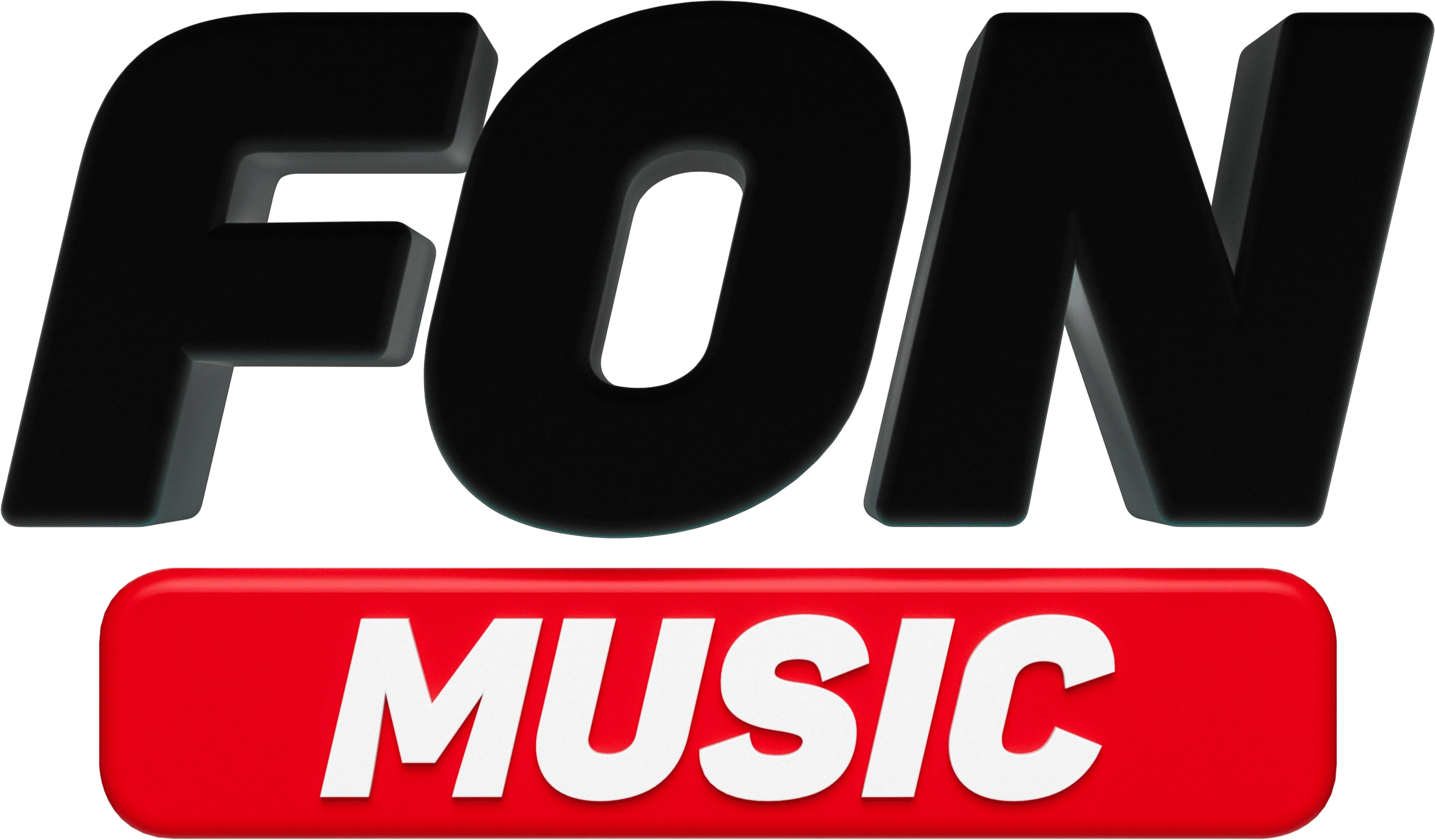
- Country: Russia
- Headquarters: Moscow

Programming
- Language: Russian

Ownership
- Owner: Solaris Promo Production (43%); Eleonora Mishustina (1%); Fonbet (56%)

History
- Launched: May 31, 2016
- Replaced: A-One
- Former names: ТНТ Music (2016–2026)

Links
- Website: fonmusic.ru

FON MUSIC (ООО "Fonbet ТV") is a Russian musical entertainment TV channel, which airs exclusive shows, popular music and entertainment programs. It started broadcasting on 31 May 2016 at 16:00 (Moscow time), replacing the TV channel "A-One". FON MUSIC broadcasts throughout Russia and is present in packages with over 750 cable operators.

== History ==
On 17 October 2016, a related online radio station, TNT MUSIC RADIO, was launched.

On 4 June 2018, the TV channel switched to a 16:9 broadcasting format.

In September 2019, the TV channel TNT Music & THT Music Radio launched the sister project HIPHOP RADIO.

In March 2023, it became known that the betting company Fonbet became the sole owner of ТNТ Music.

== Broadcasting ==
=== Essential ===
- Birobidzhan — 1 ТВК (from 00:00 to 02:00).

=== Satellite ===
The TV channel is broadcast from the satellites "Horizons 2", "Express АМ5" & "Ямал-401", as well as from the platforms "Триколор ТВ", "Телекарта" (Orion Express) & "NTV-PLUS".

== Presenters ==
- Vlad Bogdanov — presenter of the program "Big News"
- Vlada Goldberg — presenter of the program "Big News"
- Yaroslava — presenter of the program "Big News Sport"
- Alyona Ruse — presenter of the program "Гаджеты и Люди"
- VJ Chuck (Mikhail Klimov) — presenter of the program "Плей-лист. Новинки"
- ANNA (Anna Romanovskaya) — presenter of "Топ Чарта"
- Lissa (Lissa Avemi) — presenter of the program "K-POP Тайм"
- Пол Пунш (Pavel Boginich) — presenter of "Русского Чарта"

== Former presenters ==
- Mot — former presenter of "Топ Чарта"
- ST — former presenter of "Топ Чарта"
- Gleb Bolelov — former presenter of the programs "Big News", "Soundcheck" & "Funbox"
- Elena Temnikova — former presenter of "Русского Чарта"
- Yulia Parshuta — former presenter of "Русского Чарта"
- Polina Favorskaya — former presenter of "Русского Чарта"
- Yulia Gavrilina — former presenter of the program "Топ ТикТок"
- Timofey Sushin — former presenter of the program "Гаджеты и Люди"
- Anya Pokrov — former presenter of the program "Цветответ"
- Daniil Boom or Liza Vasilenko — former presenter of the program "Топ ТикТок"
- Nastya Bad Barbie (Anastasia Chernyshova) — former presenter of the program "Топ ТикТок"
- Mary Gu (Maria Bogoyavlenskaya) — former presenter of "Русского Чарта"
- TERNOVOY (Oleg Ternovoy) — former presenter of "Топ Чарта"
- Konfuz (Mikhail Margaryan) — former presenter of "Топ Чарта"

In December 2018 the station went on air in Bishkek. At the same time, the station competes with those owned by "Gazprom-Media" stations NRJ & Like FM.
