= A-One (TV channel) =

Russian television channel

A-One Первый альтернативный
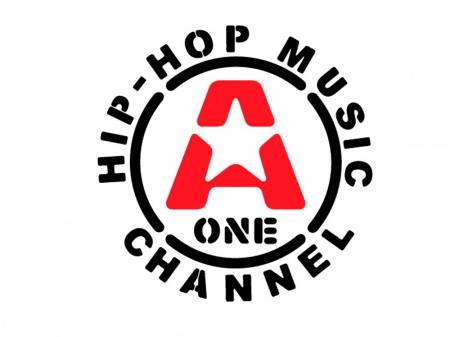
- Country: Russia
- Broadcast area: Russia (cable and satellite networks)

Programming
- Languages: Russian, English
- Picture format: 4:3 (576i, SDTV)

History
- Launched: 1 August 2005; 20 years ago
- Closed: 31 May 2016; 10 years ago
- Replaced by: TNT Music
- Former names: Alternative One (2005)

Links
- Website: http://aonehiphop.ru/

A-One Hip-Hop Music Channel was a Russian music television channel broadcasting hip hop music.

The channel was broadcast on the satellite ABS-2 (FTA), on the "Tricolor TV" platform, and in 850 cable packages.

== History ==
After briefly being known as Alternative One before launch, A-One launched on 1 August 2005. The channel initially broadcast alternative and rock music, including the establishment of a Rock Alternative Music Prize. In 2011, Alexander Tolmatsky took over and changed the channel's format to hip-hop music. Tolmatsky departed in 2013; the channel won several national awards during this time and launched a national party series, "A-One Hype Nights", featuring popular Russian and foreign artists.

In 2016, Gazprom-Media acquired a 49 percent stake in the channel, which was rebranded as TNT Music on 31 May.
