= XIII Corps =

13 Corps, 13th Corps, Thirteenth Corps, or XIII Corps may refer to:

== Germany ==
- XIII (Royal Württemberg) Corps, Imperial German Army, World War I
- XIII Army Corps (Wehrmacht), World War II
- XIII SS Army Corps, Waffen-SS, World War II

== Russia and Soviet Union ==
=== Russian Empire ===
- 13th Army Corps (Russian Empire)

=== Soviet Union ===
- 13th Guards Army Corps
- 13th Mechanized Corps
- 13th Rifle Corps
- 13th Tank Corps

== United Kingdom ==
- XIII Corps (United Kingdom)

=== Artillery Volunteer Corps ===
- 13th (St Just) Cornwall Artillery Volunteer Corps
- 13th (Keyham) Devonshire Artillery Volunteer Corps
- 13th (Calton Artisans) Lanarkshire Artillery Volunteer Corps
- 13th (Everton) Lancashire Artillery Volunteer Corps

=== Rifle Volunteer Corps ===
- 13th (Dukinfield) Cheshire Rifle Volunteer Corps
- 13th (East Devon and Honiton) Devonshire Rifle Volunteer Corps
- 13th (Odd Fellows – Cheltenham) Gloucestershire Rifle Volunteer Corps
- 13th Kent (Greenwich) Rifle Volunteer Corps
- 13th Lanarkshire Rifle Volunteer Corps
- 13th Staffordshire Rifle Volunteer Corps
- 13th (Hurstpierpoint) Sussex Rifle Volunteer Corps

== United States ==
- XIII Corps (United States)
- XIII Corps (Union Army), American Civil War

== Other countries ==
- 13th Air Force Corps, People's Republic of China
- XIII Corps (Grande Armée), a unit of the Imperial French Army during the Napoleonic Wars
- XIII Army Corps (Italy)
- XIII Corps (Ottoman Empire)
- 13th Army Corps (Ukraine)

== See also ==
- List of military corps by number
- 13th Army (disambiguation)
- 13th Battalion (disambiguation)
- 13th Brigade (disambiguation)
- 13th Division (disambiguation)
- 13th Group (disambiguation)
- 13th Regiment (disambiguation)
- 13th Squadron (disambiguation)
- 13th (disambiguation)
