= 13th Cavalry =

13th Cavalry may refer to:

== Divisions ==
- 13th Cavalry Division (Russian Empire)
- 13th Cavalry Division (Soviet Union)
- 13th Guards Cavalry Division, Soviet Union

== Brigades ==
- 13th Cavalry Brigade (British Indian Army)
- 13th Indian Cavalry Brigade

== Regiments ==
- 13th Cavalry Regiment (United States)
- 13th Hussars
- 13th Lancers
- 13th Duke of Connaught's Lancers (Watson’s Horse)
- 13th Reserve Cavalry Regiment
- 13th/18th Royal Hussars
- XIII Corps Cavalry Regiment

=== American Civil War regiments ===
==== Union Army ====
- 13th Indiana Cavalry Regiment
- 13th Illinois Cavalry Regiment
- 13th Kentucky Cavalry Regiment
- 13th Ohio Cavalry Regiment
- 13th Pennsylvania Cavalry Regiment
- 13th Tennessee Cavalry Regiment

==== Confederate Army ====
- 13th Missouri Cavalry Regiment
- 13th Texas Cavalry Regiment
- 13th Virginia Cavalry Regiment

== Battalions ==
- 13th (Irish) Battalion, Imperial Yeomanry

== See also ==
- 13th Division (disambiguation)
- 13th Brigade (disambiguation)
- 13th Regiment (disambiguation)
