= Thirteenth =

Thirteenth or 13th may refer to:

- Ordinal form of the number 13 (number).
- A fraction, 1/13, equal to one of 13 equal parts
- Thirteenth (interval)

== Popular culture ==
- 13th (film), a 2016 documentary on the Thirteenth Amendment to the United States Constitution
- 13th (TV series), 2025 Indian television series
- "The 13th", a song from Wild Mood Swings by The Cure
- "The Thirteenth" (Orange Is the New Black), a 2019 television episode
- Thirteenth (fairy tale), an Italian fairy tale from Sicily

== Geography ==
- 13th meridian east, a line of longitude
- 13th meridian west, a line of longitude
- 13th parallel north, a circle of latitude
- 13th parallel south, a circle of latitude
- Thirteenth Avenue (disambiguation)
- 13th Street (disambiguation)

== Military ==
- Thirteenth Army (disambiguation)
- 13th Battalion (disambiguation)
- 13th Brigade (disambiguation)
- 13th Division (disambiguation)
- 13th Regiment (disambiguation)
- 13th Squadron (disambiguation)

== Other ==
- Thirteenth Amendment (disambiguation)
  - Thirteenth Amendment to the United States Constitution
- 13th century
- 13th century BC
- Thirteenth of the month, a recurring calendar date
  - Friday the 13th

== See also ==
- 13 (disambiguation)
