= 13th Group =

13th Group may refer to:

- 13th Carrier Air Group, a unit of the United Kingdom Royal Navy
- 13th Air Expeditionary Group, a unit of the United States Air Force
- 13th Bombardment Group, a unit of the United States Air Force

== See also ==
- 13th Army (disambiguation)
- XIII Corps (disambiguation)
- 13th Division (disambiguation)
- 13th Brigade (disambiguation)
- 13th Regiment (disambiguation)
- 13th Battalion (disambiguation)
- 13 Squadron (disambiguation)
