= V Corps (United States) =

- Shoulder sleeve insignia
- Active: 7 July 1918–2 May 1919; 29 July 1921–15 November 1924; 20 October 1940–12 June 2013; 16 October 2020–present
- Country: United States of America
- Branch: United States Army
- Type: Corps
- Role: Headquarters
- Part of: United States Army Europe and Africa
- Nickname: "Victory Corps"
- Motto: "It Will Be Done"
- Colors: Blue and white
- March: "Victory!"
- Decorations: Meritorious Unit Commendation (2), Army Superior Unit Award (2)
- Campaigns: World War I; St. Mihiel; Meuse-Argonne; Lorraine 1918; World War II; Normandy (with arrowhead); Northern France; Rhineland; Ardennes-Alsace; Central Europe; Kosovo; Kosovo Air Campaign; War on terrorism; Afghanistan; Transition I; Iraq; 2003 invasion of Iraq; Transition of Iraq; National Resolution

Commanders
- Current commander: (United States) LTG Thomas M. Feltey
- Command Sergeant Major: (United States) CSM Philip B. Blaisdell
- Command Sergeant Major, Forward: (United States) CSM Eric Bohannon
- Deputy Commanding General, Interoperability: (Poland) Maj.Gen Piotr Trytek, Polish Army
- Deputy Commanding General, Maneuver: (United Kingdom) Maj Gen Charles Grist, British Army
- Deputy Commanding General, Readiness: (United States) BG John B. Mountford
- Chief of Staff: (United States) COL Kevin Jackson

Insignia
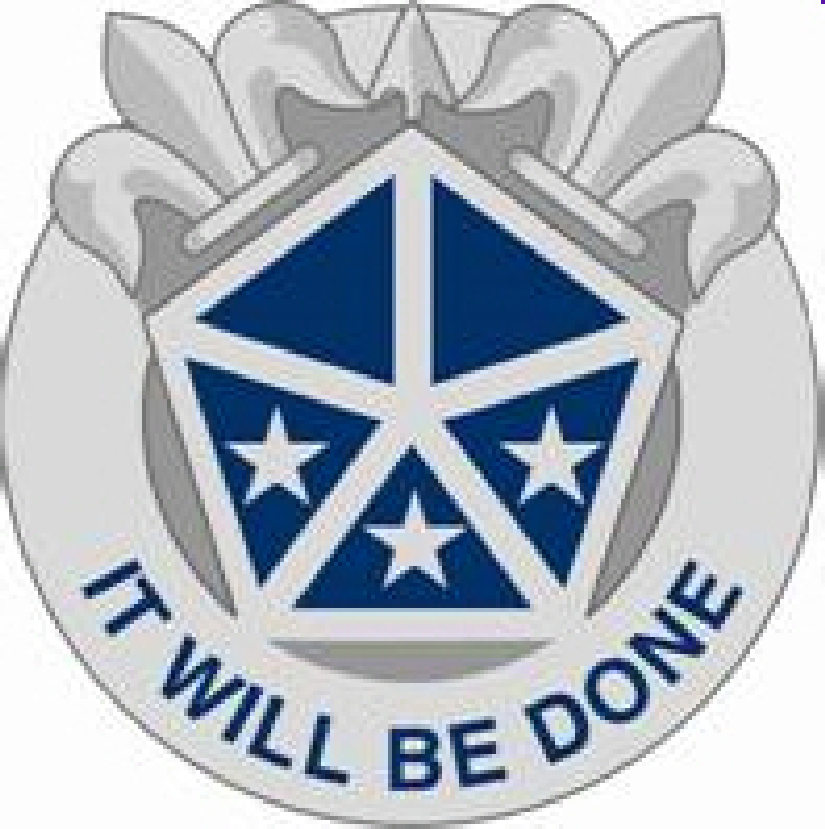
- Distinctive insignia

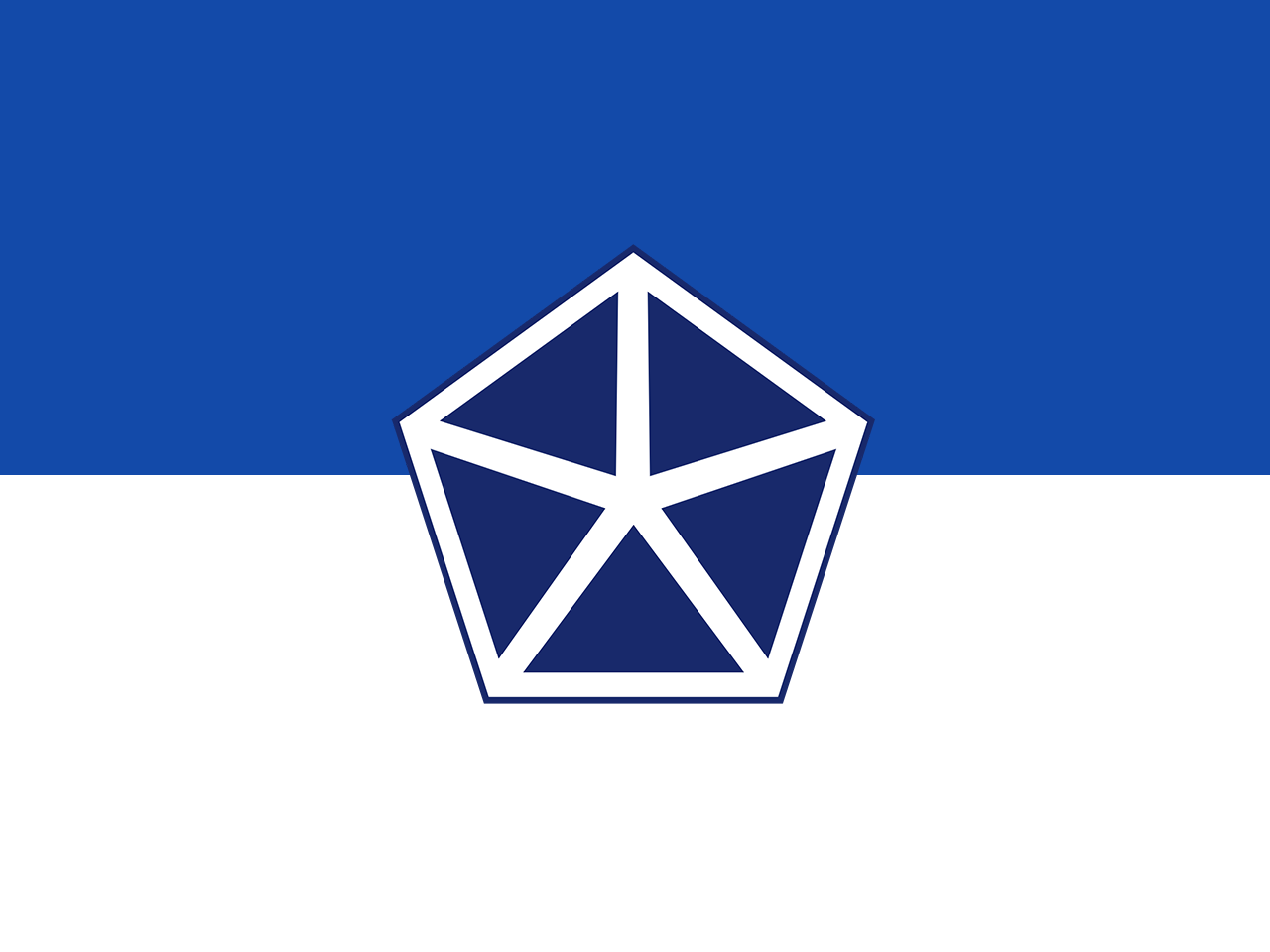
- V Corps Flag

V Corps (/ˈviː kɔːr/), formerly known as the Fifth Corps, is a regular corps of the United States Army headquartered at Fort Knox, Kentucky, and Camp Kościuszko, Poland.

It previously served during World War I, World War II, the Cold War, Kosovo War, and the war on terrorism.

== Shoulder sleeve insignia ==
The corps's shoulder patch, a pentagon whose points lie on an imaginary circle 2 1/8 inches (2.1 in) in diameter whose edges are white lines 3/16 inch (0.19 in) in width and whose radial lines are white 1/8 inch (0.13 in) in width, was approved on 3 December 1918. The triangles thus outlined in white are flag blue. The pentagon represents the number of the Corps, while blue and white are the colors associated with Corps flags.

== History ==
=== World War I ===
V Corps was organized 7–12 July 1918 in the Regular Army in France, as part of the American Expeditionary Forces. By the end of World War I, the Corps had fought in three named campaigns.

=== Interwar period ===
The V Corps was constituted in the Organized Reserve on 29 July 1921, allotted to the Fifth Corps Area, and assigned to the Second Army. The corps headquarters was activated on 17 February 1922 at Fort Thomas, Kentucky, with Regular Army and Organized Reserve personnel. The Headquarters Company was allotted to the Ohio National Guard, but was placed on the "Deferred National Guard" list on 2 July 1923 and allotted to the Organized Reserve.

The Headquarters Company was initiated late 1924 with Reserve personnel at Columbus, Ohio. The corps headquarters was responsible for providing and planning administration, organization, supply, and training for army, corps, and other non-divisional Reserve units, less field and coast artillery, in the Fifth Corps Area. The headquarters was relieved from active duty on 15 November 1924, and all Regular Army personnel were reassigned to the Headquarters, Non-Divisional Group, Fifth Corps Area, which assumed the responsibilities previously held by the V Corps. Both the Headquarters and Headquarters Company remained active in the Organized Reserve. The corps headquarters was relocated in late 1924 to Indianapolis, Indiana, where most of the Reserve personnel assigned to the unit were located. Headquarters, V Corps was withdrawn from the Organized Reserve on 15 August 1927 and allotted to the Regular Army; Headquarters Company, V Corps was withdrawn from the Deferred National Guard list on 15 September 1927 and permanently allotted to the Organized Reserve.

The headquarters company was withdrawn from the Organized Reserve on 1 October 1933 and allotted to the Regular Army. At the same time, the corps headquarters was partially activated at Fort Hayes, Ohio, with Regular Army personnel from the headquarters, Fifth Corps Area, and Organized Reserve personnel from the corps area at large. Though a "Regular Army Inactive" unit from 1927 to 1940, the corps headquarters was organized provisionally for short periods using its assigned Reserve officers and staff officers from Headquarters, Fifth Corps Area. These periods of provisional active duty were generally for command post exercises and major maneuvers. Headquarters, V Corps was fully activated on 20 October 1940, less Reserve personnel, at Camp Beauregard, LA.

=== World War II ===
After Nazi Germany declared war on the United States on 11 December 1941, the corps deployed (January 1942) the first American soldiers to the European Theater of Operations, United States Army. That initial deployment was known as the U.S. Army Northern Ireland Force or MAGNET. On 6 June 1944, V Corps assaulted Omaha Beach, Normandy. Corps soldiers then broke out from the beachhead, liberated Paris and Sedan, Ardennes, and raced to the German border. After liberating Luxembourg, V Corps fought in the Battle of the Bulge, captured Leipzig, made first contact with the Red Army at Torgau, and, south in Czechoslovakia, liberated Plzeň by May 1945.

=== Cold War ===
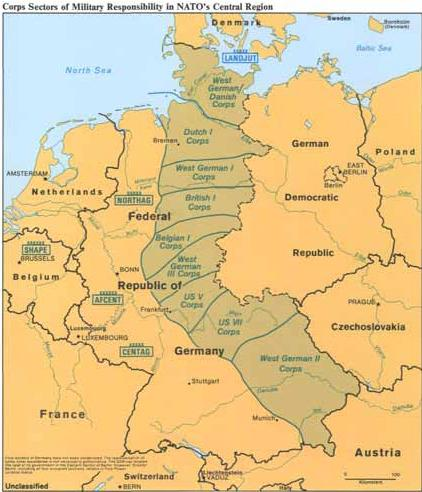
V Corps Cold War NATO assignment

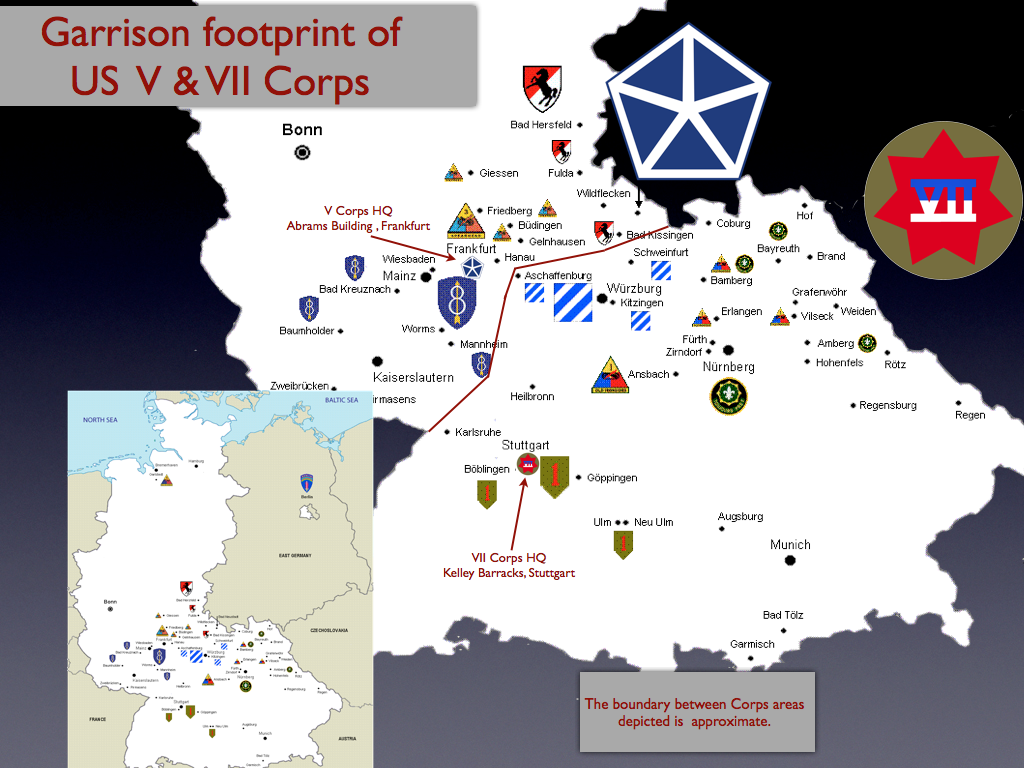
V Corps Garrison Footprint in the 1980s

In March 1947, United States European Command directed that its combat forces were to convert to "Occupation duties." On 1 December 1950, due to concern of a Soviet threat to Western Europe during the Korean War, Seventh Army was activated as a field army in Europe. Seventh Army absorbed the two main Occupation Duty forces then in Germany, namely the 1st Infantry Division and the United States Constabulary.

By middle 1948 limited combat training had been restored within the European Command.

In December, 1950 President Truman declared a National Emergency due to the Korean War, and four divisions were dispatched to reinforce U.S. forces in Europe, including the National Guard's 28th and 43rd Infantry Divisions. In May 1951 the 4th Infantry Division arrived in United States Army Europe (USAREUR) in Germany, and on 3 August 1951, V Corps was reactivated and assigned to the Seventh Army in USAREUR. In July the 2d Armored Division arrived in Germany, and on 25 August 1951 the 4th Infantry Division (HQ: Frankfurt) and 2d Armored Division (HQ: Bad Kreuznach) were assigned as V Corps divisions.

As of June 1954, the main unit assignments to V Corps were 1st Infantry Division, 4th Infantry Division, 2d Armored Division, and 19th Armor Group (19th AG was the size of a large brigade, with 3 tank battalions and one mech. infantry battalion stationed from Mannheim to Wildflecken). The first U.S. armored division to be stationed east of the Rhine River in the Cold War, namely V Corps' 3d Armored Division, arrived in May/June 1956. (The 3d Armored Div. replaced the 4th Infantry Div.; later, the 2d Armored Div. was replaced by the Bad Kreuznach arriving 8th Infantry Div.) The 19th Armor Group (HQ Frankfurt) was replaced by the 4th Armor Group on 1 July 1955 (the 4th AG was approximately the size of the replaced 19th AG); the 4th Armor Group was deactivated in the 1963 ROAD conversion. In 1955 the 1st Infantry Division gyroscoped to CONUS, and was replaced in V Corps by the 10th Infantry Division from CONUS. In 1958 the 3rd Infantry Division gyroscoped from CONUS and the 10th Infantry Division gyroscoped to CONUS.

Due to the 1963 ROAD reorganization in USAREUR, V Corps ultimately lost two assigned units: (1) the 4th Armor Group was inactivated; (2) the 3rd Infantry Division, with its headquarters at Wuerzburg, was reassigned to VII Corps. After the Cold War collapse of the Warsaw Pact, V Corps soldiers deployed both units and individuals to Saudi Arabia for the Gulf War; and to other operations in Kuwait, northern Iraq, Croatia, Somalia, Republic of Macedonia, Rwanda, and Zaire.

== Organization 1989 ==
=== Reorganization ===
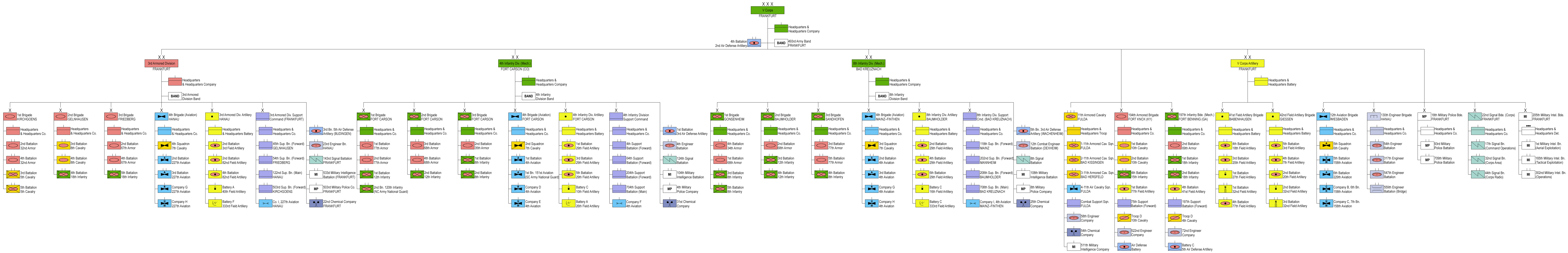
V US Corps 1989

At the end of the Cold War in 1989 V Corps consisted of the following units:

- V Corps, Frankfurt, West Germany
  - 3rd Armored Division, Frankfurt
  - 4th Infantry Division (Mechanized), Fort Carson, Colorado (Operation Reforger unit)
  - 8th Infantry Division (Mechanized), Bad Kreuznach
  - V Corps Artillery, Frankfurt
    - 41st Field Artillery Brigade, Babenhausen
    - 42nd Field Artillery Brigade, Giessen
  - 11th Armored Cavalry Regiment, Fulda
  - 194th Armored Brigade, Fort Knox, Kentucky (Operation Reforger unit)
  - 197th Infantry Brigade (Mechanized), Fort Benning, Georgia (Operation Reforger unit)
  - 12th Aviation Brigade, Wiesbaden
  - 130th Engineer Brigade, Hanau
  - 18th Military Police Brigade, Frankfurt
  - 22nd Signal Brigade (Corps), Frankfurt
  - 205th Military Intelligence Brigade, Frankfurt
  - 3rd Corps Support Command, Wiesbaden

=== 1990s ===
In December 1994, as part of the realignment of United States Armed Forces, V Corps moved from the IG Farben Building to Campbell Barracks in Heidelberg, severing a forty-three-year tie with Frankfurt. The corps reached out to the armed forces of eastern Europe with numerous initiatives to foster closer ties and better understanding. Maintaining the NATO commitment, V Corps in 1994 created two bi-national corps with Germany. For Command Component Land Heidelberg missions, the corps commanded the 13th (German) Armored Infantry Division, while II (German) Corps commanded the 1st Armored Division.

After the Cold War collapse of the Warsaw Pact, V Corps soldiers deployed both units and individuals to Saudi Arabia for the Gulf War; and to other operations in Kuwait, northern Iraq, Croatia, Somalia, Republic of Macedonia, Rwanda, and Zaire.

=== Germany ===
In December 1994, as part of the realignment of United States Armed Forces, V Corps moved from the IG Farben Building to Campbell Barracks in Heidelberg, severing a forty-three year tie with Frankfurt. The corps reached out to the armed forces of eastern Europe with numerous initiatives to foster closer ties and better understanding. Maintaining the NATO commitment, V Corps in 1994 created two bi-national corps with Germany. For Command Component Land Heidelberg missions, the corps commanded the 13th (German) Armored Infantry Division, while II (German) Corps commanded the 1st Armored Division.

=== Eastern Europe ===
In December 1995, V Corps deployed 1st Armored Division and elements of six separate brigades for the Implementation Force (IFOR). The corps headquarters and Headquarters Company, the 3d Support Command, and the separate brigades helped form the National Support Element headquartered in Hungary for United States Armed Forces in Bosnia. Brigades of the two divisions rotated in the peace enforcement mission for a number of years in Bosnia. Headquarters and Headquarters Company, V Corps, was decorated with the Army Superior Unit Award in 1998 in recognition of the unit's performance in Implementation Force (IFOR). In April 1999, V Corps deployed the headquarters and subordinate units to Albania as Task Force Hawk, a force involved in the ongoing crisis in Kosovo. The 1st Infantry Division served in Kosovo twice and the 1st Armored Division served once, in addition to V Corps separate brigades.

=== Iraq ===
V Corps US Army

At the end of 2002, V Corps deployed to Kuwait under United States Central Command for the Iraq War. The United States-led coalition brought about a regime change in Iraq and satisfied international concerns about Iraq and weapons of mass destruction. The corps and its maneuver brigades crossed into Iraq on 21 March 2003 as the main effort. In sixteen days of fighting, V Corps advanced more than 540 miles straight-line distance from Kuwait to Baghdad, decisively defeated the Iraqi Armed Forces, and toppled the regime of Saddam Hussein.

On 15 June 2003, the corps formed Combined Joint Task Force 7, based in Baghdad, and continued military operations to pacify the remainder of Iraq, rebuild the country, and create democratic institutions. As part of Combined Joint Task Force 7 mission, V Corps soldiers sought out and arrested or killed the major figures in the previous Iraqi regime, culminating in the arrest of Saddam Hussein himself. On 1 February 2004, V Corps was succeeded in Combined Joint Task Force 7 by III Corps and redeployed to its home station in Heidelberg, Germany. In recognition of its combat achievements in Iraq, the Department of the Army, in 2004, awarded the Headquarters and Headquarters Company the Meritorious Unit Commendation (Army).

=== War on terrorism ===
The 2003 invasion of Iraq command structure.

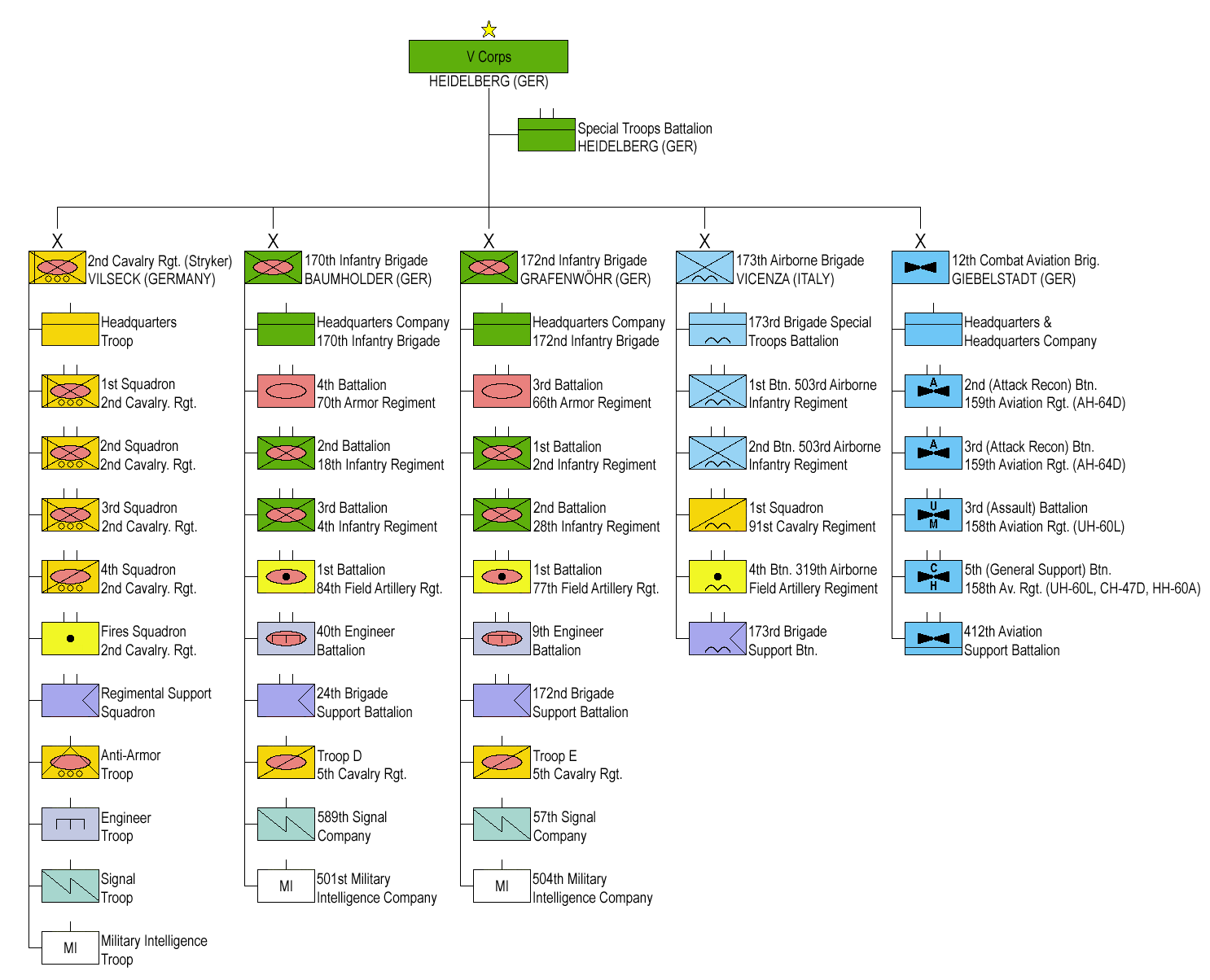
War on terrorism command structure

At the end of 2002, V Corps deployed to Kuwait under United States Central Command for the Iraq War. The United States-led coalition brought about a regime change in Iraq and satisfied international concerns about Iraq and weapons of mass destruction. The corps and its maneuver brigades crossed into Iraq on 21 March 2003 as the main effort. In sixteen days of fighting, V Corps advanced more than 540 miles straight-line distance from Kuwait to Baghdad, decisively defeated the Iraqi Armed Forces, and toppled the regime of Saddam Hussein.

On 15 June 2003, the corps formed Combined Joint Task Force 7, based in Baghdad, and continued military operations to pacify the remainder of Iraq, rebuild the country, and create democratic institutions. As part of Combined Joint Task Force 7 mission, V Corps soldiers sought out and arrested or killed the major figures in the previous Iraqi regime, culminating in the arrest of Saddam Hussein himself. On 1 February 2004, V Corps was succeeded in Combined Joint Task Force 7 by III Corps and redeployed to its home station in Heidelberg, Germany. In recognition of its combat achievements in Iraq, the Department of the Army, in 2004, awarded the Headquarters and Headquarters Company the Meritorious Unit Commendation (Army). In January 2006, the corps, deployed to Iraq and replaced XVIII Airborne Corps as the command and control element for Multi-National Corps–Iraq. During its second year-long deployment, which ended on 14 December 2006, V Corps continued to lead coalition forces and made great strides battling a widespread insurgency, and conducting a massive rebuilding effort. From 2012 to 2013, V Corps served in the Islamic Republic of Afghanistan, providing command and control of all U.S. ground forces stationed there. On 16 February 2012, it was announced that Headquarters and Headquarters Battalion, V Corps would inactivate upon redeployment from Afghanistan per guidance issued by the Department of the Army earlier that same year. On 12 June 2013, V Corps was awarded an Army Superior Unit Award, a Meritorious Unit Commendation, then ceremonially inactivated at Biebrich Palace, Wiesbaden, Germany.

=== Reactivation ===
On 11 February 2020, the United States Department of the Army announced the activation of corps headquarters (V Corps). V Corps Headquarters will have approximately 635 soldiers, with approximately 200 who will support an operational command post in Europe. The Corps Headquarters is projected to be operational by autumn 2020. On 12 February 2020, the Army announced that V Corps' new headquarters would be located at Fort Knox, Kentucky. United States Army Chief of Staff, General James McConville stated:

The activation of an additional Corps headquarters provides the needed level of command and control focused on synchronizing U.S. Army, allied, and partner nation tactical formations operating in Europe. It will enhance U.S. Army Europe and U.S. European Command as they work alongside allies and partners to promote regional stability and security.

The establishment of V Corps supports United States European Command's request for increased command and control capability. In May 2020, MG John Kolasheski, commanding general of the 1st Infantry Division was nominated to command the newly reactivated V Corps. Once confirmed by the Senate he would receive a third star. Kolasheski was confirmed to the rank of lieutenant general on 21 May 2020. He was promoted by Army Chief of Staff James C. McConville on 4 August 2020 in Kraków, Poland. McConville announced that V Corps forward headquarters would be established in Poland after the next fiscal year started on 1 October 2020. Two hundred of the expected 630 headquarters staff members would be stationed in Poznań on a rotational basis.

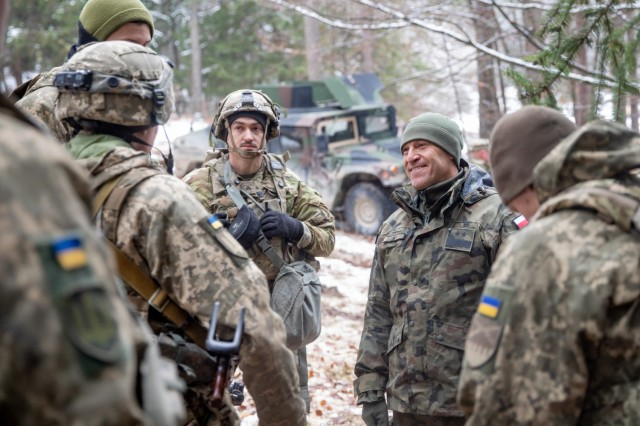
DCG for Interoperability Adam Joks (Poland) visits soldiers of the US and Ukraine, 10 Dec 2021

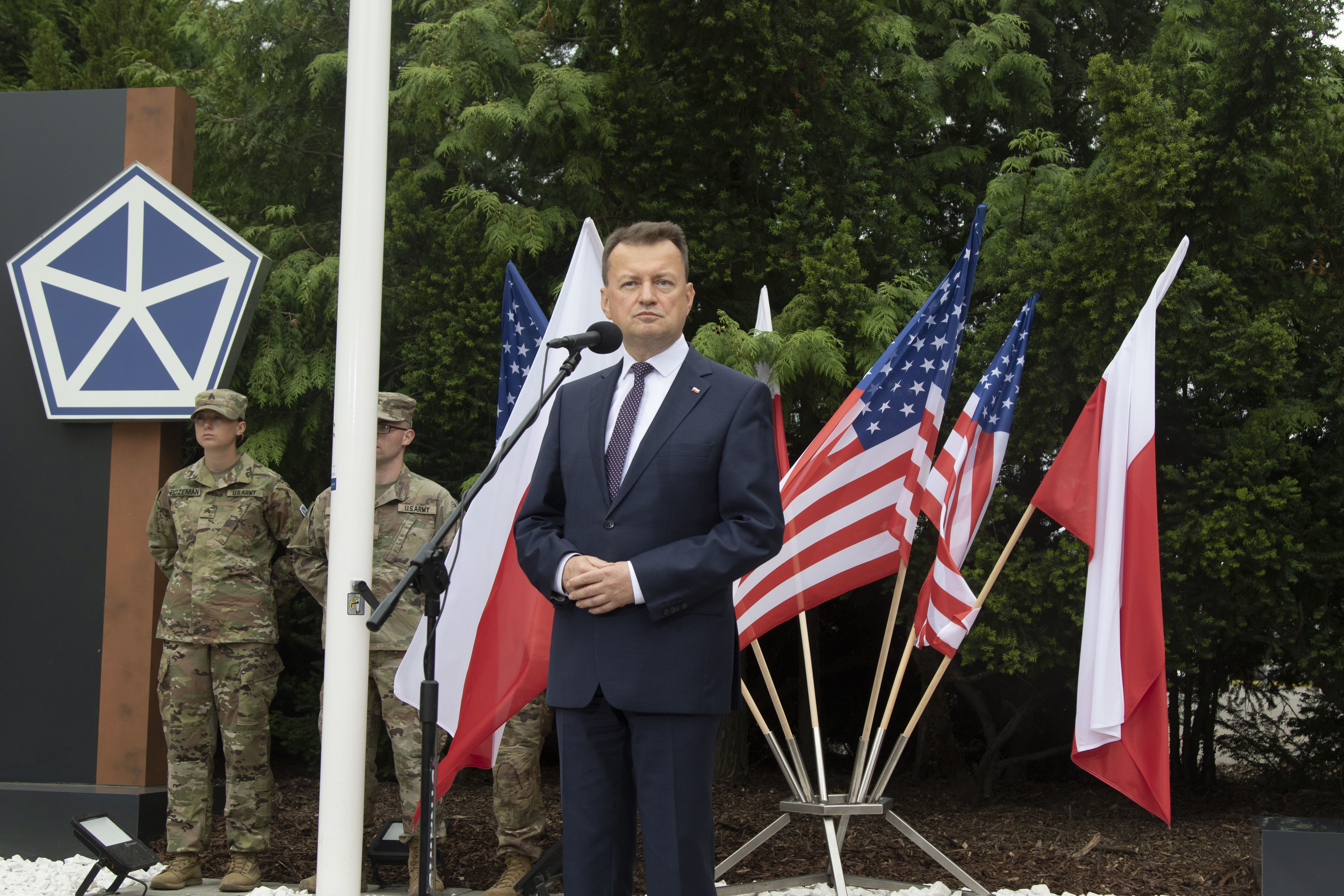
Polish Minister of National Defense Mariusz Blaszczak speaks at the naming ceremony for Camp Kosciuszko

The forward headquarters will "conduct operational planning, mission command and oversight of the rotational forces in Europe", and work alongside allies and partners to build readiness and enhance interoperability. On 21 July 2021 MG Jeffery Broadwater was announced as DCG, V Corps. (In May 2021, MG Matthew Van Wagenen was appointed as DCG-Manoeuvre to be based in Poznan, Poland, but who presently serves as a DCG for the Army component of SHAPE.) On 7 March 2022 a V Corps headquarters element deployed to Germany, joining the forward element already in Europe, to "provide additional command and control of U.S. Army forces in Europe." The headquarters is also tasked to "provide a more robust presence in Europe and enable the Corps to synchronize current contingency operations, support the ongoing mission to reinforce NATO’s eastern flank and coordinate multinational exercises across the continent." This deployment is in response to the Russian invasion of Ukraine. At the 29 June 2022 NATO summit in Madrid US President Joe Biden announced that a permanent military base would be established in Poland that would serve as the new headquarters of V Corps and "strengthen the US-NATO interoperability across the entire eastern flank," in further response to the Russian campaign in Ukraine. On 30 July 2022 the headquarters of V Corps (Forward) in Poznań was renamed Camp Kosciuszko. On 13 to 15 December 2023 V Corps and the Polish Armed Forces General Command co-hosted their first Warfighting Symposium, in Warsaw. The symposium included briefings on training, technical interoperability, operational development, scenario-based practical exercises, and intelligence assessments.

== Organization ==
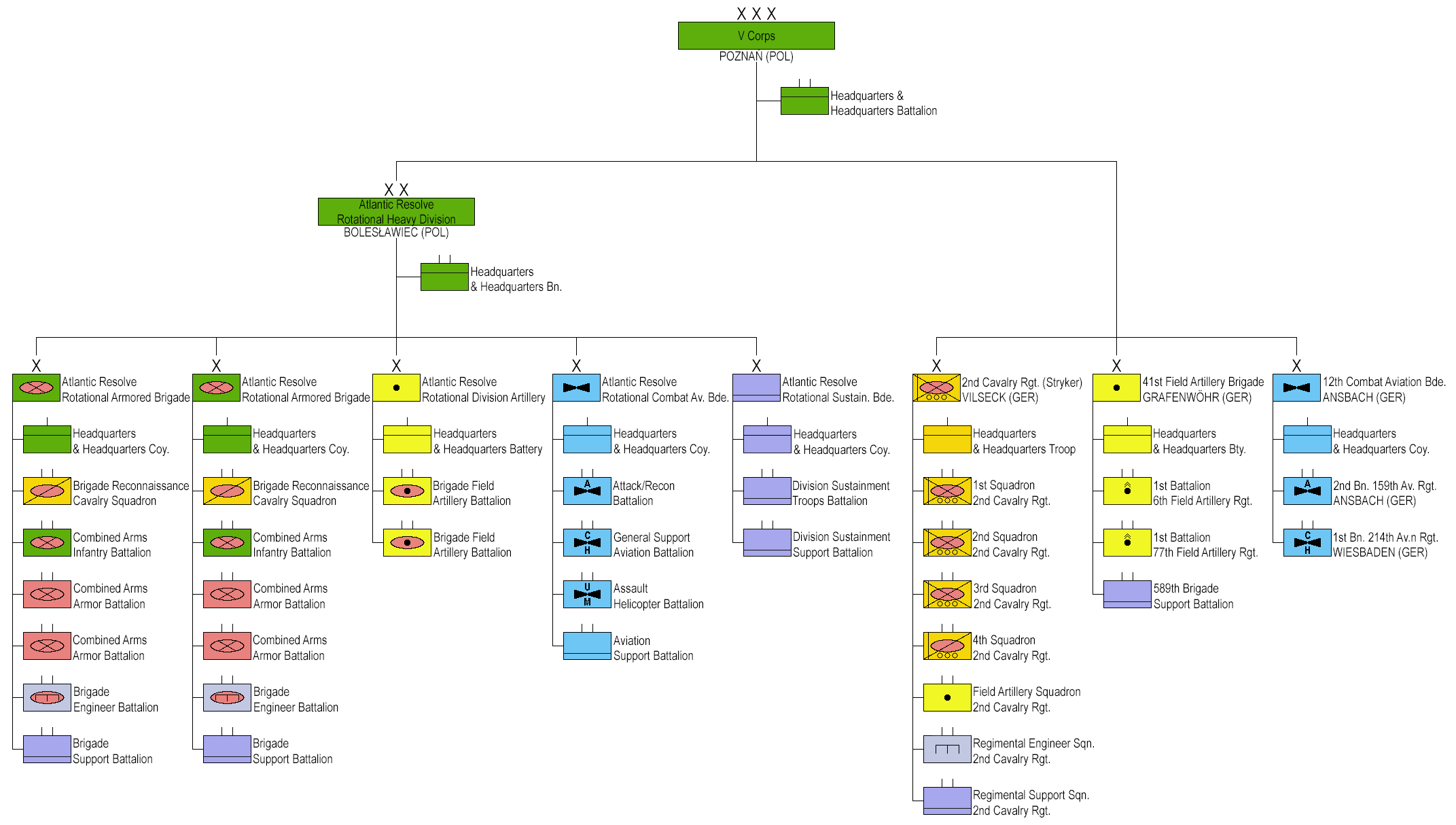
V Corps organization December 2025

As of December 2025 V Corps consists of the following units:

- V Corps, in Poznań (Poland)
  - Headquarters and Headquarters Battalion, in Poznań (Poland)
  - 2nd Cavalry Regiment, in Vilseck (Germany)
  - 41st Field Artillery Brigade, in Grafenwöhr (Germany)
  - 12th Combat Aviation Brigade, in Ansbach (Germany)
  - Atlantic Resolve rotational units:
    - Rotational Heavy Division in Bolesławiec (Poland)
      - 2 × Rotational Armored Brigade Combat Teams
      - 1 × Rotational Division Artillery
      - 1 × Rotational Combat Aviation Brigade
      - 1 × Rotational Sustainment Brigade
  - NATO Enhanced Forward Presence (EFP) Poland

== List of commanders ==
No.	Commander		Term		
No.	Portrait	Name	Took office	Left office	Term length
1	John S. Kolasheski	Lieutenant General; John S. Kolasheski (born 1961)	4 August 2020	8 April 2024	3 years, 248 days
2	Charles D. Costanza	Lieutenant General; Charles D. Costanza	8 April 2024	8 August 2026	2 years, 122 days
3	Thomas Feltey	Major General; Thomas Feltey	8 August 2026	Incumbent	24 days

== See also ==
- List of commanders
- Meuse-Argonne Order of Battle
- Ardennes-Alsace Order of Battle
- Liberation of Iraq Order of Battle

== Bibliography ==
- Burger, Eric H. Staff Sgt. "V Corps Song–March "Victory!"." Print.
- Condon, Edward J., Jr., and Raymond A. Mathews Historical Report of the V Corps-1949. n.p., 1950.
- Hill, John G. V Corps Operations in ETO, 6 Jan 1942 – 9 May 1945. Paris: Paul Viviers, 1945.
- History V Corps June 6, '44. 668th Engineer Topographic Company, 1945.
- Huebner, C.R. "V Corps From Belgium to Czechoslovakia". Army and Navy Journal 83 (4 December 1945):55ff.
- Tucker, Spencer, ed. A Global Chronology of Conflict: From the Ancient World to the Modern Middle East. Volume V: 1861–1918. Santa Barbara, Calif.: ABC-CLIO, 2010.
- United States. Dept. of Army. Center of Military History. Armies, Corps, Divisions, and Separate Brigades. Wilson, John B., Comp. Washington: GPO, 1999.
- United States. Dept. of Army. Center of Military History. "Ruck it up!" The post-Cold War transformation of V Corps, 1990–2001. By Charles E. Kirkpatrick. Washington: GPO, 2006.
- United States. Dept. of Army. Combined Arms Center. V Corps in Bosnia-Herzegovina, 1995–1996: an oral history. Harold E. Raugh, Jr., Ed. Fort Leavenworth, Kansas: Combat Studies Institute Press, 2010.
- United States. Dept. of Army. Headquarters, V Corps. "It Will Be Done!" U.S. Army V Corps, 1918–2009: a pictorial history. Harold E. Raugh, Jr., Ed. Grafenwoehr, Germany: Druckerei Hutzler, 2009.
- United States. Dept. of Army. Headquarters, V Corps. The History of V Corps. By Charles E. Kirkpatrick. n.p., 2001.
