= Thirteenth Army =

Thirteenth Army or 13th Army may refer to:

- 13th Group Army, China
- Thirteenth Army (Japan)
- Thirteenth Area Army, Japan
- 13th Army (Russian Empire), unit in World War I
- 13th Army (RSFSR), a unit in the Russian Civil War
- 13th Army (Soviet Union)
- 13th Air Army, Soviet Union

== See also ==
- List of armies by number
- XIII Corps (disambiguation)
- 13th Division (disambiguation)
- 13th Brigade (disambiguation)
- 13th Regiment (disambiguation)
- 13th Battalion (disambiguation)
- 13th Squadron (disambiguation)
- 13th (disambiguation)
