= 13th Infantry =

13th Infantry may refer to:

- 13th Infantry Division (disambiguation)
- 13th Infantry Brigade (disambiguation)
- 13th Infantry Regiment (disambiguation)

== See also ==
- 13th (disambiguation)
