= 13 =

Thirteen or 13 most often refers to:

- 13 (number), the natural number following 12 and preceding 14
- Any of the years 13 BC, AD 13, 1913, or 2013

Thirteen or 13 may also refer to:

== Music ==
=== Albums ===
- 13 (Black Sabbath album), 2013
- 13 (Blur album), 1999
- 13 (Borgeous album), 2016
- 13 (Brian Setzer album), 2006
- 13 (Die Ärzte album), 1998
- 13 (The Doors album), 1970
- 13 (Havoc album), 2013
- 13 (HLAH album), 1993
- 13 (Indochine album), 2017
- 13 (Marta Savić album), 2011
- 13 (Norman Westberg album), 2015
- 13 (Ozark Mountain Daredevils album), 1997
- 13 (Six Feet Under album), 2005
- 13 (Suicidal Tendencies album), 2013
- 13 (Solace album), 2003
- 13 (Second Coming album), 2003
- 13 (Timati album), 2013
- 13 (Ces Cru EP), 2012
- 13 (Denzel Curry EP), 2017
- Thirteen (CJ & The Satellites album), 2007
- Thirteen (Emmylou Harris album), 1986
- Thirteen (Harem Scarem album), 2014
- Thirteen (James Reyne album), 2012
- Thirteen (Megadeth album), 2011
- Thirteen (October Noir album), 2019
- Thirteen (Robert Miles album), 2011
- Thirteen (Teenage Fanclub album), 1993
- Thirteens (album), by Leona Naess, 2008

=== Songs ===
- "13", by Anthrax from State of Euphoria
- "13", by D'espairsRay from Monsters
- "13", by Megadeth from Thirteen
- "13", by Perspects from the Miss Kittin album A Bugged Out Mix
- "13", by Tally Hall on the album Marvin's Marvelous Mechanical Museum
- "13", by Queen from Made in Heaven
- Track 13, an untitled spoken-word track on the album Miscellaneous T by They Might Be Giants
- "Thirteen", one of the Number Pieces by John Cage
- "Thirteen" (song), 1972, by Big Star
- "Thirteen", by Danzig from 6:66 Satan's Child; first recorded by Johnny Cash
- "Thirteen", by C418 from Minecraft – Volume Alpha, 2011
- "Thirteen", by The Antlers from Hospice
- "Thir13teen", by Type O Negative from Life Is Killing Me

== Fictional characters ==
- Thirteen (House) or Dr. Remy Hadley, in the television series House
- Thirteen (My Hero Academia), in the manga series My Hero Academia
- Doctor Thirteen, a DC Comics character
- 13, from the Japanese anime Dorohedoro
- 13, a cat in the animated series The Zimmer Twins

== Film, television, and theater ==
=== Films ===
- The Thirteen, a 1937 Soviet action film
- Thirteen (1974 film), a Hong Kong film
- Thirteen (2003 film), an American film
- 13 (2006 film), a horror comedy released as Botched
- 13 (2010 film), an English-language remake of 13 Tzameti, starring Jason Statham
- 13th (film), a 2016 American documentary
- 13: The Musical, 2022, a Netflix film adaptation of the stage musical 13

=== Television ===
- 13: Fear Is Real, a 2009 reality TV show
- Thirteen (TV series), a 2016 British drama
- Thirteen (television station), or WNET, a television station licensed to Newark, New Jersey

=== Other ===
- 13 (musical), 2007, by Jason Robert Brown
- 13 (play), 2011, by Mike Bartlett

== Literature ==
- 13 (Armstrong novel), 2012, in the Women of the Otherworld series
- 13 (Zeitoun novel)
- 13 (manga), 2014, by Sorachi Hideaki
- XIII (comics), a Belgian graphic novel series
- Thirteen (comics), a story published in 2000 AD magazine
- Thirteen, the US title of Black Man, a 2007 science fiction novel
- Thirteen, a 2008 children's novel in the Winnie Years series by Lauren Myracle

== Games ==
- 13 (card game), a Vietnamese card game
- Thirteens, or Baroness, a solitaire card game
- XIII (game), a 2003 first-person shooter video game based on the Belgian comic series

== Other uses ==
- Thirteen (roller coaster), a steel coaster at Alton Towers in England
- List of highways numbered 13
- List of public transport routes numbered 13
- The Brave Thirteen, refers to the Apprentice Boys who shut the City Gates of Derry on the advancing Jacobite forces

== See also ==
- XIII (disambiguation)
- Number 13 (disambiguation)
- Th1rt3en (disambiguation)
- Thirteenth (disambiguation)
- 十三 (disambiguation)
