= NS13 =

NS13, NS-13, NS 13, NS.13, or, variation, may refer to:

== Places ==
- Yishun MRT station (station code: NS13), Yishun, Singapore
- Tokiwadai Station (Osaka) station code: NS13; Toyono, Toyono District, Osaka Prefecture, Japan
- Uchijuku Station (station code: NS13), Ina, Saitama, Japan
- Marowijne District (FIPS region code NS13), Suriname
- Cole Harbour-Portland Valley (constituency N.S. 13), Nova Scotia, Canada

== Other uses ==
- Blue Origin NS-13, a 2020 October 13 Blue Origin suborbital spaceflight mission for the New Shepard
- RAF N.S. 13, a British NS class airship

== See also ==
- NS (disambiguation)
- 13 (disambiguation)
