= 13th Street =

13th Street may refer to:

== Television ==
- 13th Street (TV channel), a European and Australian television channel featuring action and suspense programming.
  - 13th Street (Australian TV channel), former Australian version of 13th Street
  - 13th Street (German TV channel), German version of 13th Street
  - 13ème Rue, French version of 13th Street
  - Calle 13 (TV channel), Spanish version of 13th Street

== Places in the United States ==
- 13th Street (Manhattan), a street in Manhattan, New York City
- 13th Street (Omaha), a street in Omaha, Nebraska
- 13th Street (St. Louis), a street in St. Louis, Missouri
- 13th Street (Sacramento RT), a Sacramento RT light rail station in Sacramento, California
- 13th Street (SEPTA station), a SEPTA rapid transit station in Philadelphia, Pennsylvania

== See also ==
- 13th Avenue (disambiguation)
