= American order of battle Meuse–Argonne offensive =

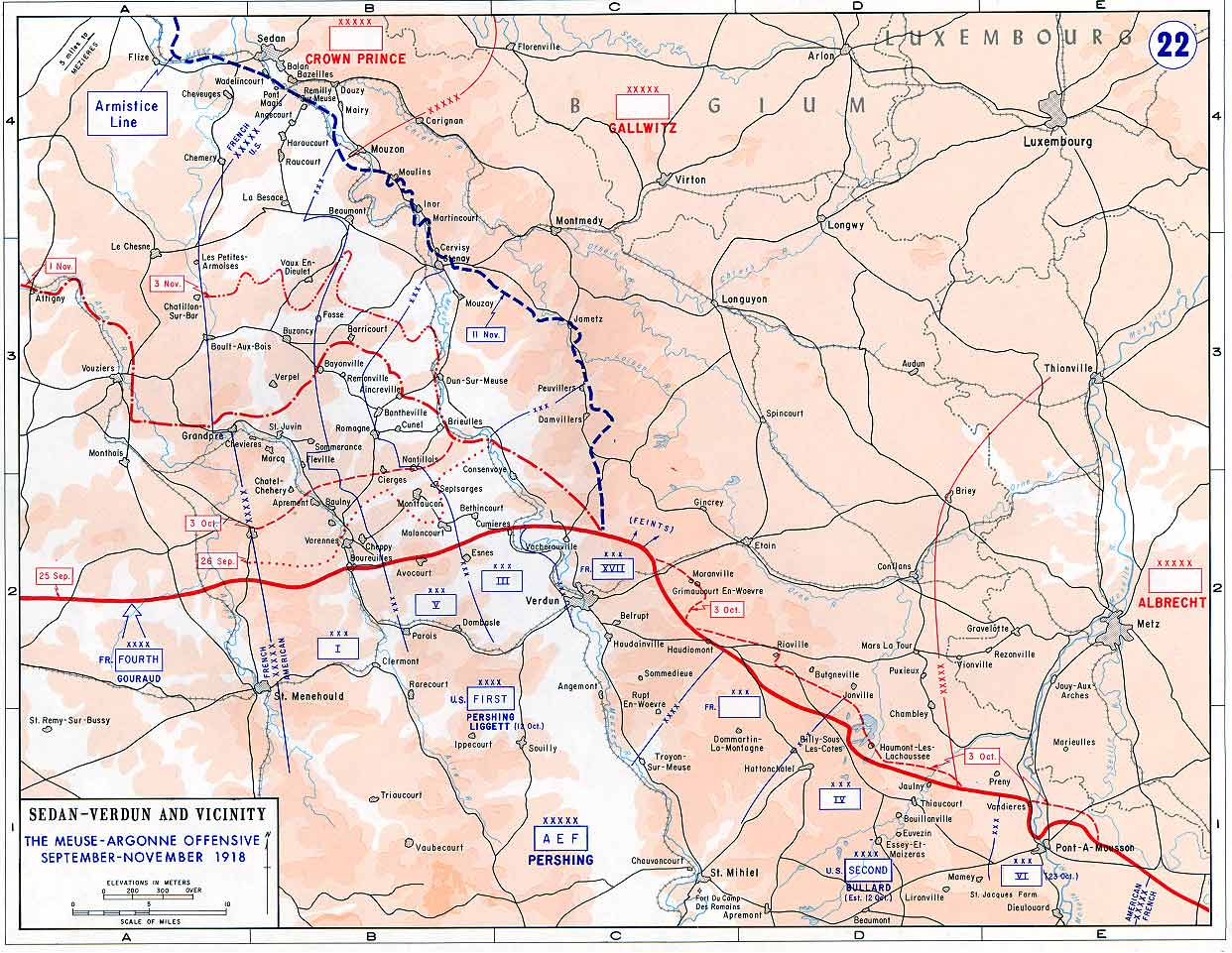
Map of the Meuse-Argonne Offensive.

This is the order of battle for the American Expeditionary Force at the beginning and end of the Meuse-Argonne Offensive, September 26 to November 11, 1918.

== Beginning of the battle (September 26, 1918) ==
=== First U.S. Army ===
General John J. Pershing, Commanding

I Corps

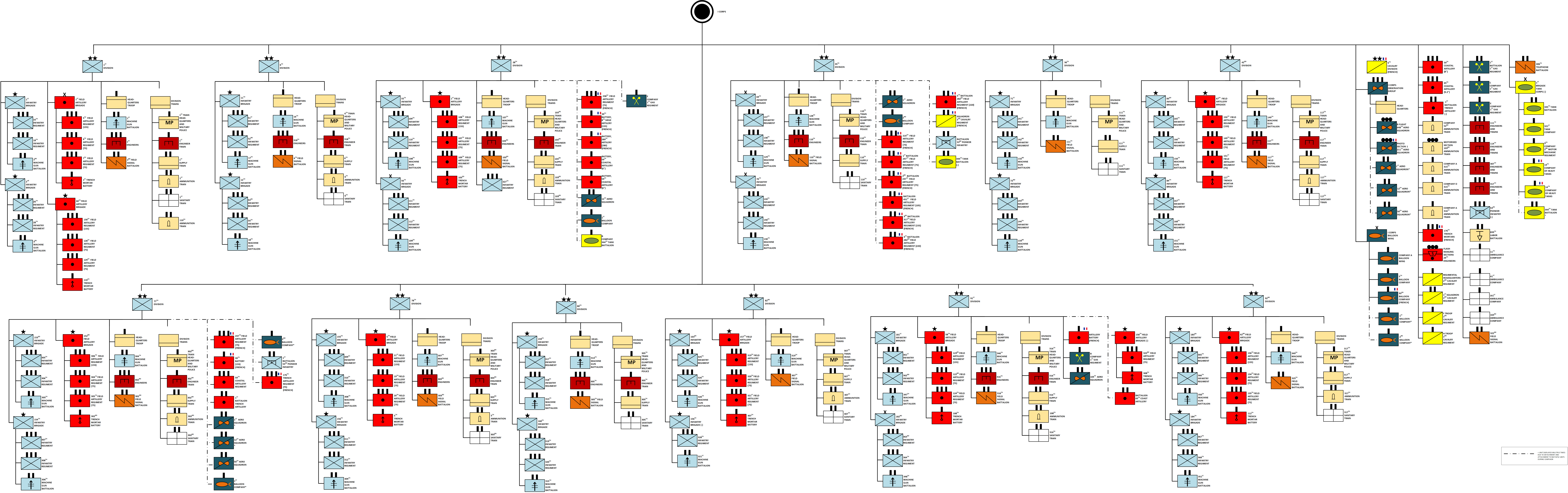
Order of Battle of I Corps

Major General Hunter Liggett, Commanding

- 28th Division (Maj. Gen. Charles H. Muir)
- 35th Division (Maj. Gen. Peter E. Traub)
- 77th Division (Maj. Gen. Robert Alexander)
- Reserve: 92nd Division (Maj. Gen. Charles C. Ballou)

III Corps Major General Robert Lee Bullard, Commanding

- 4th Division (Maj. Gen. John L. Hines)
- 33rd Division (Maj. Gen. George Bell)
- 80th Division (Maj. Gen. Adelbert Cronkhite)
- Reserve: 3rd Division (Maj. Gen. Beaumont B. Buck)

V Corps Major General George H. Cameron, Commanding

- 37th Division (Maj. Gen. Charles S. Farnsworth)
- 79th Division (Maj. Gen. Joseph E. Kuhn)
- 91st Division (Maj. Gen. William H. Johnston)
- Reserve: 32nd Division (Maj. Gen. William G. Haan)

In Reserve

- 1st Division (Maj. Gen. Charles P. Summerall)
- 29th Division (Maj. Gen. Charles G. Morton)
- 82nd Division (Brig. Gen. William P. Burnham)

== End of the battle (November 10, 1918) ==
General John J. Pershing, Army Group Commander

=== First U.S. Army ===
Lieutenant General Hunter Liggett, Commanding

I Corps Major General Joseph T. Dickman, Commanding

- 42nd Division (Maj. Gen. Charles T. Menoher until Nov 7, Maj. Gen. Charles Dudley Rhodes until Nov 10, Brig. Gen. Douglas MacArthur)
- 77th Division (Maj. Gen. Robert Alexander)
- 78th Division (Maj. Gen. James H. McRae)

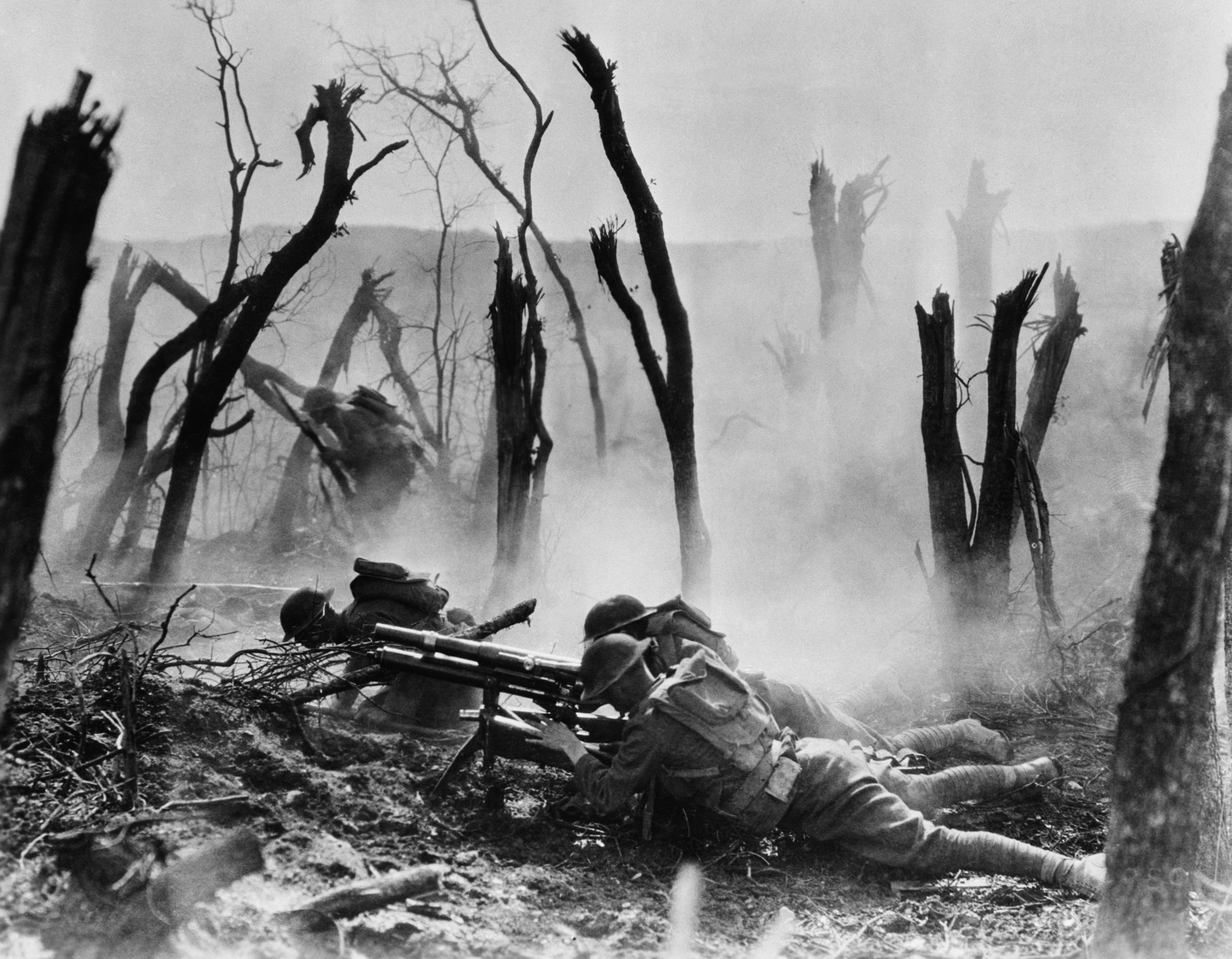
U.S. soldiers of 2nd Division engaged in the Argonne Forest

III Corps Major General John L. Hines, Commanding

- 3rd Division (Brig. Gen. Preston Brown)
- 5th Division (Maj. Gen. Hanson E. Ely)
- 32nd Division (Maj. Gen. William G. Haan)
- 90th Division (Maj. Gen. Henry T. Allen)

V Corps Major General Charles P. Summerall, Commanding

- 1st Division (Brig. Gen. Frank Parker)
- 2nd Division (Maj. Gen. John A. Lejeune)
- 29th Division (Maj. Gen. Charles G. Morton)
- 80th Division (Maj. Gen. Adelbert Cronkhite)
- 89th Division (Maj. Gen William M. Wright)

=== Second U.S. Army ===
Lieutenant General Robert L. Bullard, Commanding

IV Corps Major General Charles H. Muir, Commanding

- 4th Division (Maj. Gen. Mark L. Hersey)
- 28th Division (Maj. Gen. William H. Hay)
- 37th Division (Maj. Gen. Charles S. Farnsworth)

VI Corps Major General Charles C. Ballou, Commanding
(Note: With the exception of one brigade from the 88th Division, VI Corps did not actively participate in the battle.)

- 7th Division
- 88th Division
- 92nd Division

French II Colonial Corps

- French Division
- French Division
- 26th Division
- 79th Division

French XVII Corps

- French Division
- French Division
- 33rd Division
- 35th Division

== List of divisions engaged ==
At one point or another during the 47-day battle, all or part of 23 American divisions were engaged in the fighting:

- 1st Division
- 2nd Division
- 3rd Division
- 4th Division
- 5th Division
- 26th Division
- 28th Division
- 29th Division
- 32nd Division
- 33rd Division
- 35th Division
- 36th Division
- 37th Division
- 42nd Division
- 77th Division
- 78th Division
- 79th Division
- 80th Division
- 81st Division
- 82nd Division
- 88th Division
- 89th Division
- 90th Division
- 91st Division
- 92nd Division
