= 13th Division =

In military terms, 13th Division or 13th Infantry Division may refer to:

== Infantry divisions ==
- 13th Infantry Division (Belgium)
- 13th Division (People's Republic of China)
- 13th Division (German Empire)
- 13th Landwehr Division, German Empire
- 13th Panzergrenadier Division, Bundeswehr, Germany
- 13th Reserve Division, German Empire
- 13th Luftwaffe Field Division, Wehrmacht, Germany
- 13th Waffen Mountain Division of the SS Handschar (1st Croatian), a German unit in World War II
- 13th Infantry Division (Greece)
- 13th Infantry Division "Re", a unit of the Royal Italian Army
- 13th Division (Imperial Japanese Army)
- 13th Division (North Korea)
- 13th Infantry Division (Poland)
- 13th Infantry Division (Russian Empire)
- 13th Guards Rifle Division, Soviet Union
- 13th Motor Rifle Division NKVD, Soviet Union
- 13th Rifle Division (Soviet Union), Soviet Union
- 13th Division (Nationalist Spain)
- 13th Division (Syrian rebel group)
- 13th (Western) Division, United Kingdom
- 13th Infantry Division (United Kingdom)
- 13th Division (United States)
- 13th Division (Yugoslav Partisans)

== Airborne divisions ==
- 13th Guards Airborne Division, Soviet Union
- 13th Airborne Division (United States)

== Armoured divisions ==
- 13th Tank Division (People's Republic of China)
- 13th Tank Division (Czechoslovakia)
- 13th Panzer Division, a German unit in World War II
- 13th Guards Tank Division, Soviet Union
- 13th Armored Division (United States)

== Cavalry divisions ==
- 13th Cavalry Division (Russian Empire)
- 13th Guards Cavalry Division, Soviet Union

== Aviation divisions ==
- 13th Strategic Missile Division, United States
- 13th Air Defense Division, Yugoslavia

== Other divisions ==
- 13th Red Banner Rocket Division, Soviet Union
- 13th Army Division, Sweden

== See also ==
- 13th Army (disambiguation)
- 13th Brigade (disambiguation)
- 13th Regiment (disambiguation)
- 13th Group (disambiguation)
- 13th Battalion (disambiguation)
- 13 Squadron (disambiguation)
