= VF-13 (1948–1969) =

Fighter Squadron 13
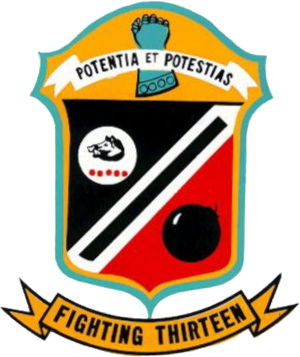
- VF-13 squadron patch
- Active: 2 August 1948 – 1 October 1969
- Country: United States
- Branch: United States Navy
- Part of: Inactive
- Nickname(s): Night Cappers
- Aircraft: F4U-5 Corsair; F8F Bearcat; F-9F Cougar; F4D Skyray; F3B Demon; F-8 Crusader

VF-13 was a Fighter Squadron of the U.S. Navy, established on 2 August 1948 and disestablished on 1 October 1969. It was the second squadron to be assigned the VF-13 designation, the original VF-13 Black Cats was established on 2 November 1943 and disestablished on 20 October 1945.

== Operational history ==
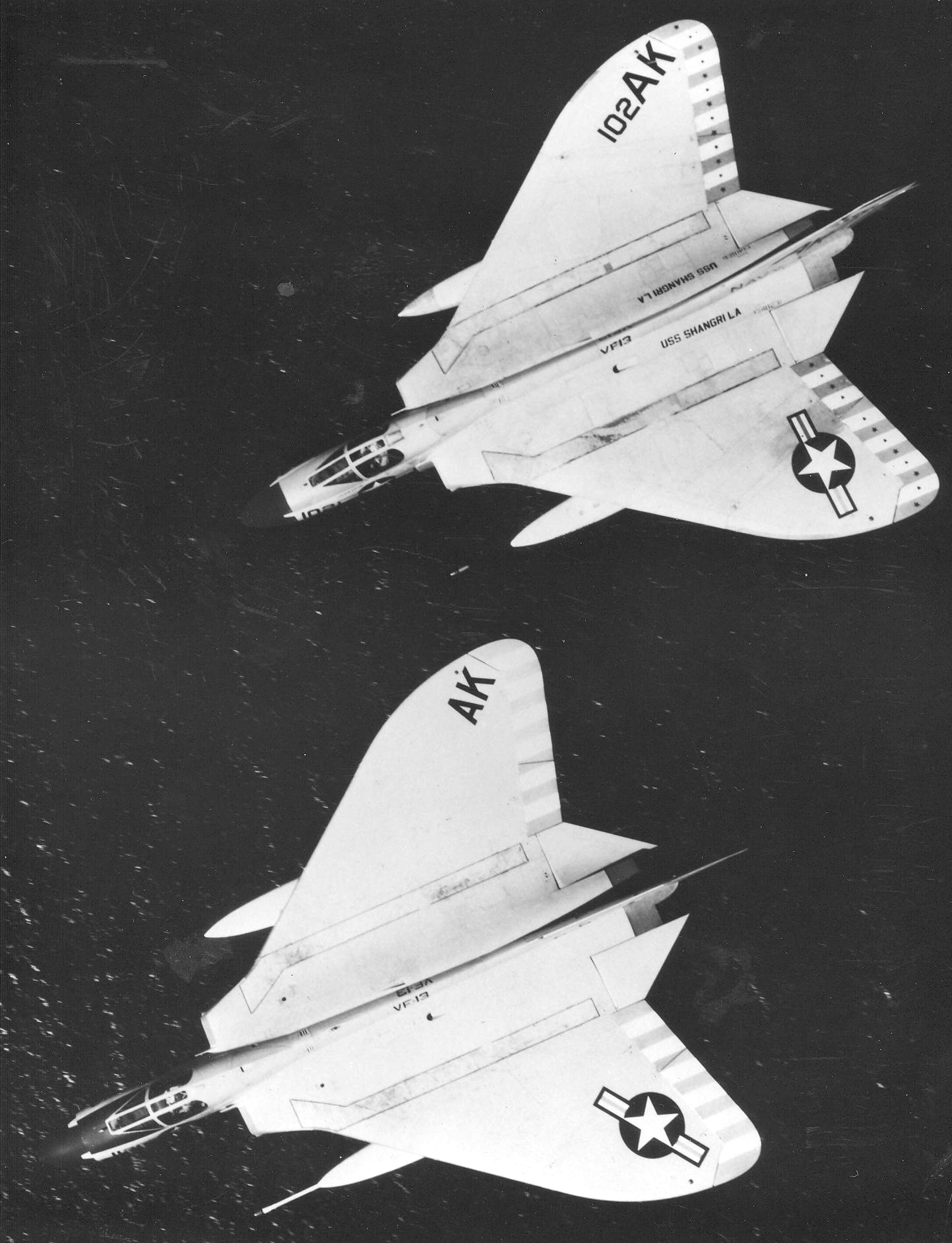
VF-13 F4D-1s in flight in 1961

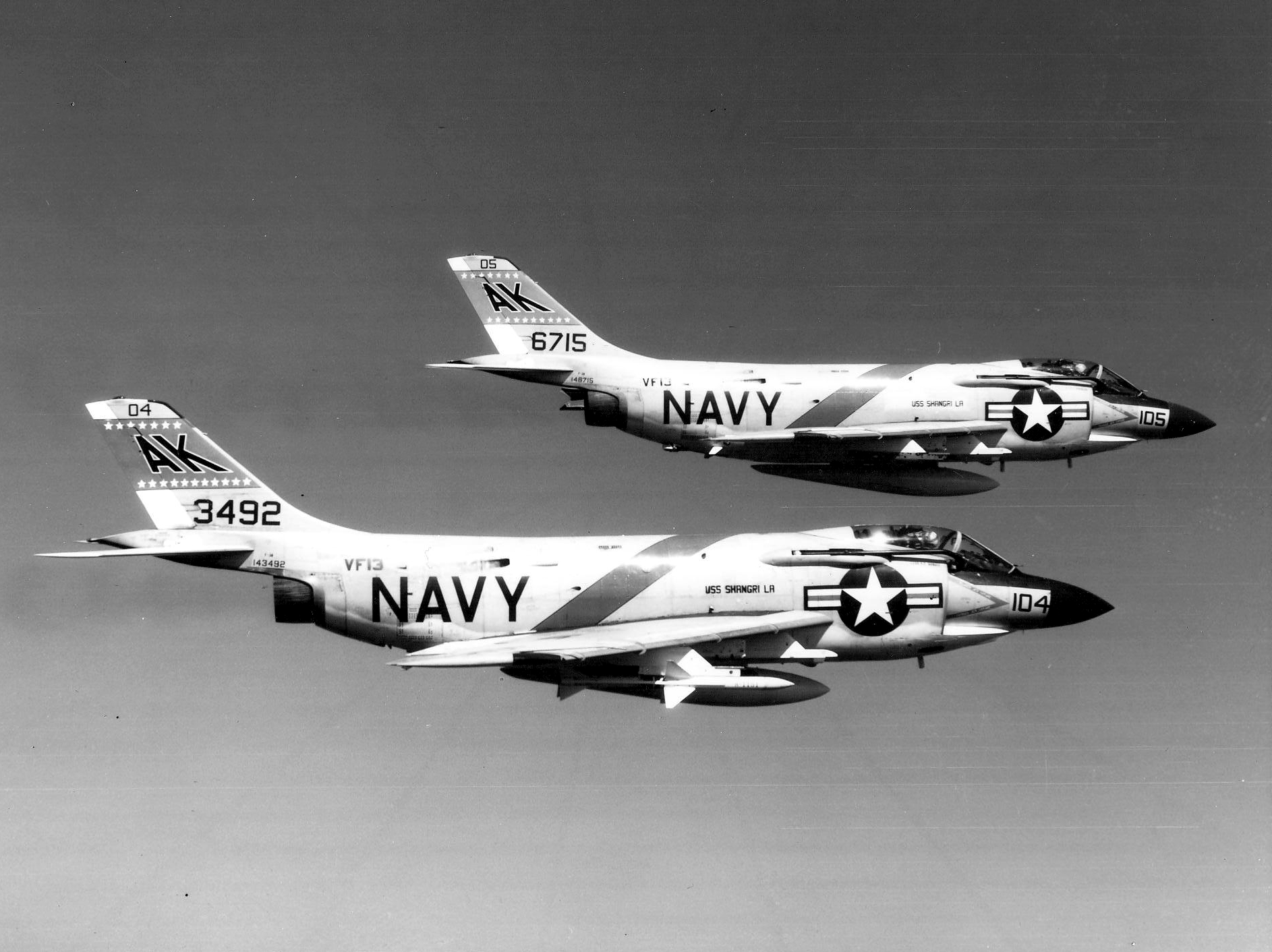
VF-13 F3Bs in flight in 1963

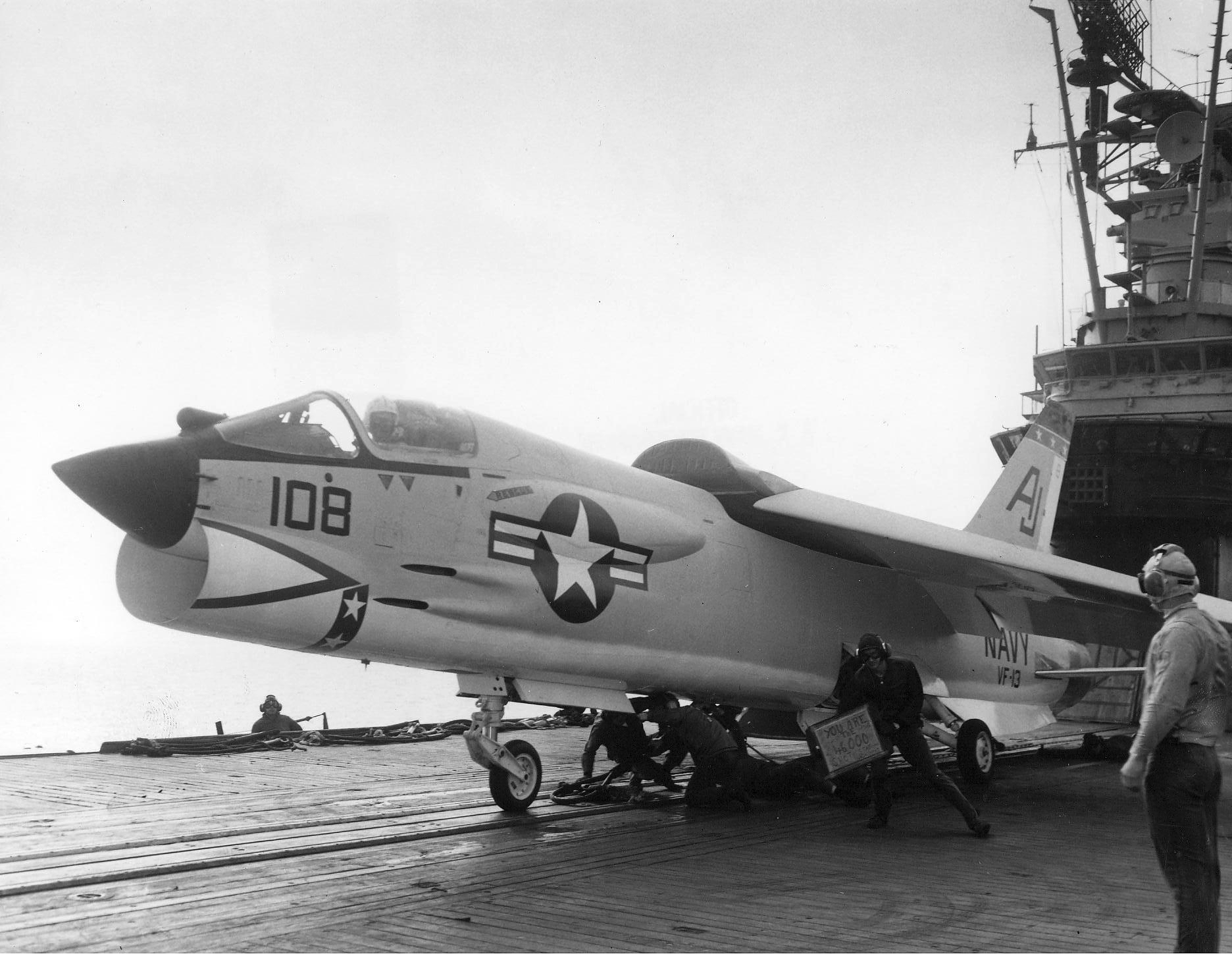
VF-13 F-8D preparing to launch from USS Shangri-La in 1968

In late 1954, VF-13 became the first operational squadron to receive the F-9F8 Cougar.

VF-13 was assigned to Air Task Group 201 (ATG-201) aboard USS Bennington for her voyage around South America from 8 September to 20 October 1955 and for the subsequent deployment to the Western Pacific from 31 October 1955 to 16 April 1956.

In the 1960s VF-13 was assigned to Carrier Air Group 10 (CVG-10) and embarked on board USS Essex for a Mediterranean deployment from 7 August 1959 to 26 February 1960. VF-13 was embarked aboard USS Shangri-La for Mediterranean deployments from 2 February to 15 May 1961 and from 7 February to 28 August 1962.

VF-13 was assigned to Carrier Air Wing 8 (CVW-8) aboard USS Shangri-La for Mediterranean deployments from 29 September 1966 to 20 May 1967, from 15 November 1967 to 4 August 1968 and from 7 January to 29 July 1969.

== Home port assignments ==
The squadron was assigned to these home ports:

- NAS Cecil Field

== Aircraft assignment ==
- F4U-5 Corsair
- F8F Bearcat
- F9F Cougar
- F4D Skyray
- F3B Demon
- F-8 Crusader

== See also ==
- List of inactive United States Navy aircraft squadrons
- History of the United States Navy
