= Th1rt3en =

Th1rt3en or TH1RT3EN may refer to:

== In music ==
- TH1RT3EN (Megadeth album), 2011
- TH1RT3EN (Robert Miles album), 2011
- TH1RT3EN (Band)

== See also ==
- Th1rte3n, a book by Richard Morgan (2007)
- Thirteen (disambiguation)
