= Thirteenth of the month =

Recurring ordinal calendar date

The thirteenth of the month or thirteenth day of the month is the recurring calendar date position corresponding to the day numbered 13 of each month. In the Gregorian calendar (and other calendars that number days sequentially within a month), this day occurs in every month of the year, and therefore occurs twelve times per year.

At least once per year, and as many as three times per year, the thirteenth of the month will fall on a Friday; such dates, referred to as Friday the 13th, are considered bad luck in some cultures. In Hispanic countries, instead of Friday, Tuesday the 13th (martes trece) is considered a day of bad luck.

- Thirteenth of January
- Thirteenth of February
- Thirteenth of March
- Thirteenth of April
- Thirteenth of May
- Thirteenth of June
- Thirteenth of July
- Thirteenth of August
- Thirteenth of September
- Thirteenth of October
- Thirteenth of November
- Thirteenth of December

In addition to these dates, this date occurs in months of many other calendars, such as the Bengali calendar and the Hebrew calendar.

== See also ==
- Thirteenth (disambiguation)
