= Achim Lidsba =

German military officer (1955–2021)

- Born: 4 March 1955; Breinum
- Died: 16 September 2021 (age 66)
- Allegiance: Germany
- Branch: German Army
- Service years: 1973–2016
- Rank: Major General
- Commands: Armoured Brigade 14; 9th German ISAF contingent; 13th Mechanized Division; German Armed Forces Staff College
- Wars and conflicts: Kosovo Force; War in Afghanistan (2001–2021) (ISAF)

Achim Lidsba (4 March 1955 – 16 September 2021) was a Major General of the Army and the German Armed Forces and since 14 July 2011 Commander of the Armed Forces Staff College in Hamburg.

== Military career ==
=== Training ===
After graduating from high school in Bad Gandersheim in 1973 he join the service of the armed forces. By 1977, he graduated in the armored infantry squad officer training and was promoted to lieutenant. From 1977 to 1981 he was first as a platoon commander and then as an intelligence officer (S2) at 341 Infantry Battalion (later 62) used in Wolf Hagen. During this time he was promoted to Lieutenant. During this time he was promoted to Lieutenant. From 1981 to 1985 was in the Infantry Battalion 52 in Rotenburg an der Fulda twice as company commander and received the promotion to captain during this time.

=== Service as a Staff Officer ===
From 1985 to 1987 he graduated from the National General Staff Course at the Staff College in Hamburg and thus received the promotion to major. Subsequently, he was from 1987 to 1989 Deputy Head of the Military Intelligence (G2) on the staff of I Corps in Münster under the command of Lieutenant Generals Dieter Clauss and Jörn Söder.

There followed a foreign assignment in Brussels, where from 1989 to 1992 acted as a consultant for military policy in the staff of the German military representative to the NATO Military Committee, underLieutenant General Rolf Hüttel. As Hüttel was added in 1992 in the Ministry of Defence in Bonn, there to take up the post of the chief of the planning staff, he took with Achim Lidsba as a speaker. After Hüttel was replaced four months later, Lidsba served until 1994 as a speaker at Hüttels successor, Vice Admiral Ulrich Weisser.

From 1994 to 1996, Lieutenant Colonel Lidsba served in the Infantry Battalion 323 in Schwanewede. In 1994 he returned to Hamburg, to serve at the Leadership Academy until 1996 as a tutor and lecturer in troop leadership in the Army General Staff Course. In 1998 he was transferred to Koblenz and served at the local Army Forces Command to 2000 as a group leader) under the command of Lieutenant-General Rüdiger Drews. In this role he was also in international missions in Kosovo.

In 2000 he moved again into the Ministry of Defence in Berlin, where he remained until 2005 as the Head of Unit in the military staff department of the Joint Staff of the Armed Forces (Armed Forces Staff III) under the Chief of Staff, Major General Egon Ramm and Rear Admiral Wolfram Kühn. Here, he was also responsible for the preparation and support of military-political armed military missions, Cabinet decisions and referrals to the German Bundestag as well as coordination with NATO, the EU, United Nations and partners.

=== Service in the rank of General ===
Under appointment to Brigadier General in 2005 by Wolfgang Brüschke he took over command of the Neustadt Armoured Brigade 14, 12 which he led until July 2007. He gave this command to Colonel Theodore Herkel, who commanded the brigade only as a brigade leader. during this time he was again deployed abroad, this time from November 2005 to April 2006 as commander of the 9th German contingent in Afghanistan as part of ISAF.

From 2007 to 2010 he was deployed again in Brussels to the NATO Military Committee and served as Deputy Staff Director and Chief of Staff of the German military representative, Vice Admiral Frank Roper and Lieutenant General Jürgen Bornemann.

On 21 June 2010, in Leipzig he took over from Major General Reinhard Kammerer command of the 13th Panzer Grenadier Division. The then German Defence Minister Karl-Theodor zu Guttenberg promoted him on 30 June 2010 in Berlin to Major General.

Starting on 14 July 2011 he was the commander of the Staff College in Hamburg. On 31 August 2016, he retired from the Staff College and the army altogether.

== Personal life ==
Lidsba was married and had three sons. One of his sons, Christian, is the guitarist of the band Stanfour. Lidsba died on 16 September 2021.

Military offices
| Preceded by Generalmajor Reinhard Kammerer | Commander of 13th Panzergrenadier Division (Bundeswehr); 21 June 2010 – 14 July 2011 | Succeeded by Generalmajor Erich Pfeffer |
