= Gleb Vannovsky =

Imperial Russian army commander

Gleb Mikhailovich Vannovsky
- Born: 5 March 1862; Putyvl, Kursk Governorate, Russian Empire
- Died: 17 October 1943 (aged 81) Cannes, France
- Allegiance: Russian Empire (Russia) White Movement
- Branch: Imperial Russian Army (Russia) White Army
- Commands: 1st Brigade, 2nd Cavalry Division; 2nd Brigade, 13th Cavalry Division; 35th Army Corps; 1st Army
- Conflicts: Boxer Rebellion; Russo-Japanese War; World War I Russian Civil War

Gleb Vannovsky (Russian: Глеб Миха́йлович Ванно́вский, 5 March 1862 – 17 October 1943) was an Imperial Russian army commander. He served in China and fought in the war against the Empire of Japan. After the October Revolution of 1917, he fought against the Bolsheviks. After the end of the civil war, he emigrated to France.

Preceded by	Commander of the 1st Brigade, 2nd Cavalry Division; 12 April – 4 August 1908	Succeeded by
Preceded by	Commander of the 2nd Brigade, 13th Cavalry Division; 1908–1914	Succeeded by
Preceded by	Commander of the 35th Army Corps; 18 April – 7 July 1917	Succeeded by
Preceded by	Commander of the 1st Army; 31 July – 9 September 1917	Succeeded by
