= XIII =

XIII may refer to:

- 13 (number) or XIII in Roman numerals
- 13th century in Roman numerals
- XIII (comics), a Belgian comic book series by Jean Van Hamme and William Vance
  - XIII (2003 video game), a 2003 video game based on the comic book series
  - XIII (2020 video game), a remake of the 2003 video game
  - XIII: The Conspiracy, a TV miniseries based on the comic book series and game of the same title
  - XIII: The Series, a 2011 TV series based on the comic book series and miniseries
- XIII (Rage album), 1998
- XIII (Mushroomhead album), 2003
- XIII (TNT album), 2018
- Factor XIII, a clotting factor inside the coagulation cascade
- Rugby league, still often known as just XIII in France due to the name Rugby once being forbidden for the league code

== See also ==
- Thirteen (disambiguation)
- Number 13 (disambiguation)
- Red XIII, a character from Final Fantasy VII
- Organization XIII, a fictional organization from the Kingdom Hearts series
- Final Fantasy XIII, a 2009 video game
- The Land Before Time XIII: The Wisdom of Friends, a 2007 film
- The King of Fighters XIII, a 2010 fighting video game
