= Number 13 =

Number 13 can refer to:

- 13 (number)
- Number 13 (comics) a comic strip in The Beano
- Number 13 (1922 film), a film by Alfred Hitchcock and starring Ernest Thesiger which was shot but never completed and is believed to be lost
- "Number 13" (2006 film), an adaptation of the M. R. James ghost story
- Number 13-class battleship
- "Number 13" (short story), by M. R. James
- "Number Thirteen", a song by Red Fang from the album Murder the Mountains

== See also ==
- 13 (disambiguation)
- XIII (disambiguation)
