= 13 Squadron =

13 Squadron or 13th Squadron may refer to:

== Aviation squadrons ==
- No. 13 Squadron RAAF, a unit of the Royal Australian Air Force
- 13th Light Bomber Squadron a World War II unit of the Hellenic Air Force
- No. 13 Squadron RAF, a unit of the United Kingdom Royal Air Force
- No. 13 Squadron RSAF, a unit of the Royal Saudi Air Force
- 13th Aero Squadron, a unit of the United States Army Air Service
- 13th Bomb Squadron, a unit of the United States Air Force
- 13th Delta Operations Squadron, a unit of the United States Space Force
- 13th Fighter Squadron, a unit of the United States Air Force
- 13th Reconnaissance Squadron, a unit of the United States Air Force
- 13th Space Warning Squadron, a unit of the United States Air Force
- Marine Air Base Squadron 13, a unit of the United States Marine Corps
- Marine Aviation Logistics Squadron 13, a unit of the United States Marine Corps
- RVAH-13 (Reconnaissance Attack (Heavy) Squadron 13), a unit of the United States Navy
- VF-13 (Fighter Squadron 13), a unit of the United States Navy
- VF-13 (1948–1969), a unit of the United States Navy
- VPB-13 (Patrol Bombing Squadron 13), a unit of the United States Navy

== Ground combat squadrons ==
- 13th Field Squadron, a unit of the 13th Engineer Regiment of the Australian Army

== See also ==
- 13th Army (disambiguation)
- 13th Division (disambiguation)
- 13th Brigade (disambiguation)
- 13th Regiment (disambiguation)
- 13th Group (disambiguation)
- 13th Battalion (disambiguation)
