= 13th Division (People's Republic of China) =

13th Division (1950–53)
- Active: 1950.1 - 1953.5
- Country: People's Republic of China
- Branch: People's Liberation Army
- Type: Division
- Role: Infantry
- Part of: 5th Corps
- Engagements: Chinese Civil War

The 13th Division (Chinese: 第13师) was created in January 1950 under the Regulation of the Redesignations of All Organizations and Units of the Army, issued by Central Military Commission on November 1, 1948, basing on the forces from Xinjiang National Army.

The division is part of 5th Corps. Under the flag of 13th division it took part in several battles and fights against anti-communist rebels during the incorporation of Xinjiang into the People's Republic of China. In May 1953, it was disbanded and became Kashgar Military sub-district. Its 40th Regiment was reorganized and renamed as 3rd Cavalry Regiment, Xinjiang Military Region.

As of disbandment division was composed of:

- 40th Regiment;
- 41st Regiment;
- 42nd Regiment.
