= 13th Psychological Operations Battalion =

The 13th Psychological Operations Battalion (originally, the 13th Psychological Warfare Battalion (Enemy Prisoner of War)) is a Battalion in the United States Army Reserve.

== History ==
It was established on 4 October 1961 in the Regular Army as Headquarters and Headquarters Co, 13th Psychological Warfare Battalion was activated on 15 November 1961 at Fort Bragg, North Carolina. The 13th was redesignated on 20 December 1965 as Headquarters and Headquarters Company, 13th Psychological Operations Battalion. Army Radio Station WCSW-FM operated under its command. Most unit members rotated from Smoke Bomb Hill to Vietnam, Korea, Germany or elsewhere based on special MOS qualifications. Inactivated on 13 September 1972 at Fort Bragg. Withdrawn from the Regular Army, allotted to the United States Army Reserve and activated at Fort Snelling, Minnesota on 30 October 1975. It was then relocated to Minneapolis, Minnesota on 1 January 1978; to Fort Snelling, Minnesota on 1 December 1979 and to Arden Hills, Minnesota on 16 January 1996.

== Campaign streamers ==
The 13th POB was awarded Campaign streamers for the defense of Saudi Arabia and for the liberation of Kuwait.

== Conflicts ==
- Operation Iraqi Freedom (Iraq)
- Operation Enduring Freedom (Afghanistan)
- Desert Shield/Desert Storm
- Support of PSYOP/Vietnam 1968-69
- Vietnam 1967-70
