= 13 (Zeitoun novel) =

2002 novel by Mary-Lou Zeitoun

- Author: Mary-Lou Zeitoun
- Language: English
- Publisher: The Porcupine's Quill
- Publication date: 2002
- Publication place: Canada
- Media type: Paperback

13 is the debut novel of Canadian author Mary-Lou Zeitoun, first published in 2002 by Porcupine's Quill.

The novel tells the story of a John Lennon obsessed 13-year-old girl called Marnie Harmon growing up in Ottawa in 1980.

== Plot ==
Marnie Harmon is a 13-year-old girl growing up in Ottawa. Initially she attends an ordinary high school, where she is alienated from her peers, who don't understand her angst, her rejection of fashionable clothes. She experiences unwelcome attention from a male teacher, and when she tries to retaliate, she is the one who is punished, being sent to a Roman Catholic high school.

It is at the more controlled school that Marnie makes friends, among the schools other rebels. They engage in rebellious behavior, like underage drinking, and hanging out in strip clubs.

Her dream of running away to New York City, to meet her hero, John Lennon, is the narrative arc that cements the story.

== Reception ==
In 2002 The Globe and Mail named Zeitoun one of their 10 "Writer's to Watch" based on 13 praising the novel and saying reading it was "like going through adolescence all over again".

Ray Robertson praised the novel's sparse narrative style, writing: "Whereas a less plot-conscious writer might have let Marnie marinate for 140 pages in her own emotional juices, stewing in the sop of her oh-so-sensitive soul, Zeitoun cleverly uses Marnie's obsession with meeting Lennon as a simple but effective storyline to hang a series of witty observations about the life of a properly alienated teenager."

Quill and Quire wrote: "First-time novelist Mary-Lou Zeitoun's 13 wryly evokes an unavoidable time and place in everyone's life – the teenage years – without rendering the experience into saccharine nostalgia."
