= 13 (Timati album) =

Studio album by Timati
- Released: October 28, 2013
- Recorded: 2013
- Genre: Hip hop
- Length: 53:42
- Label: Black Star Inc.

Timati chronology
SWAGG (2012)	13 (2013)	Olimp (2016)

13 is the fourth studio album by Russian hip hop artist Timati, released on October 28, 2013, via Black Star Inc. The album's live presentation took place on October 26 at the Crocus City Hall in Moscow.

== History ==
Timati announced the upcoming Russian-language record on September 13, 2011, even before the release of his English-language album SWAGG, on one of the episodes of the program "Table of Orders" on the TV channel RU.TV. Since then, such Russian-language singles as "On the Edge of the Earth", "Requiem for Love", "Rock Star", "London" were released, which were not included in the album. At the beginning of 2013, the poster of the presentation concert "XIII", which will be held on November 26, 2013, was presented. On September 13, 2013, the label Black Star Inc. announced the cover of Timati's fourth album. On October 21, 2013, the album's tracklist was revealed and the release date announced.

On February 14, 2014, Timati posted on his Instagram page the news about the re-release of the album 13 with unreleased tracks. On March 7, 2014, Timati announced the release date of the reissued album and noted that it will be supplemented with two unreleased tracks, a new video clip and a digital booklet. On March 17, 2014, the reissue of Album 13 was released on the iTunes Store.

== Singles ==
The first single from the album was released on June 24, 2013. A song called "What do You See" was released along with a video clip that was shot in the mountains of the Chechen Republic.

On July 2, the second single from the album "Look" was released with the participation of singer Kristina Si. In the first week of digital sales, the song took 1st place in Russia. A music video was also shot for the song, which will premiere in October 2013.

On September 2, the third video song "Time does not Wait" was released-a collaboration with musician Pavel Murashov. The song premiered on July 28, 2013, on New Wave 2013, where it was performed live by artists. Subsequently, the singles "Look " and" Time Does not Wait " were not included on the album.

== Track list ==
No.	Title	Lyrics	Music	Length
1.	"Пролог" (feat. Сергей Минаев)	Тимати, С.Минаев	П.Мурашов	2:32
2.	"Демоны" (feat. Павел Мурашов)	Тимати, П.Мурашов	П.Мурашов, Тимати	5:04
3.	"Все было не зря" (feat. Гарик Сукачёв)	Тимати	Capella	3:26
4.	"Рентген"	Тимати, Ю.Ряшенцев	П.Мурашов, В.Лебедев	3:47
5.	"Выключаем свет"	Тимати	П.Мурашов, Тимати	4:29
6.	"Голая"	Тимати	П.Мурашов, Тимати	4:00
7.	"GQ" (feat. L'One и Сергей Мазаев)	Тимати, L'One	Capella	3:27
8.	"Выходной"	Тимати	Capella	3:26
9.	"Ловушка" (feat. L'One, Мот, Фидель)	Тимати, L'One, Мот, Фидель	Capella	4:02
10.	"Море" (feat. Павел Мурашов и Фидель)	Тимати, П.Мурашов	П.Мурашов, Тимати	4:42
11.	"Полночь" (feat. Natan)	Тимати, П.Мурашов, Natan	П.Мурашов	5:37
12.	"Вертолет"	Тимати	П.Мурашов, Тимати	5:55
13.	"Что видишь ты"	Тимати	Capella	3:06
14.	"Прокатись со мной" (feat. Тимур Сказка)	Тимати	П.Мурашов, Тимати	4:02
15.	"Понты" (feat. Егор Клинаев)	Тимати	П.Мурашов, Тимати	4:16

== Recording participants ==
- Timati — album artist, lyricist, producer, music author (tracks 2, 5, 6, 10, 12, 14, 15)
- Capella — author of music (tracks 3, 7, 8, 9, 13), co-producer
- Pavel Murashov-General music Producer, guest artist (tracks 2, 10), music author (tracks 1, 2, 4, 5, 6, 10, 11, 12, 14, 15)
- L'One - guest artist (tracks 7, 9), lyricist (tracks 7, 9)
- Sergey Minaev - guest artist (track 1), lyricist (track 1)
- Garik Sukachev - guest artist (track 3)
- Sergey Mazaev - guest artist (track 7)
- Moth-guest artist (track 9), lyricist (track 9)
- Fidel — guest artist (tracks 9, 10), lyricist (track 9)
- Nathan-guest artist (track 11), lyricist (track 11)
- Egor Klinaev - guest artist (track 15)
- Lebedev V. M.-author of music (track 4)
- Ryashentsev Yu. E. - author of words (track 4)
- Pasha — Executive Producer
- Viktor Abramov-Executive Producer
- Konstantin "Kostorch" Matafonov-mixing and recording
- Chris Gehringer — Sterling Sound Mastering) - mastering

== Release history ==
Region	Date	Format	Label
Worldwide release	October 28, 2013	digital distribution	Black Star Inc.
Russia	November 5, 2013	CD	Black Star Inc., Monolith Records
Worldwide release (reissue)	March 17, 2014	digital distribution	Black Star Inc.
