= Thirteenth Amendment (disambiguation) =

The Thirteenth Amendment to the United States Constitution was proclaimed in 1865 and abolished slavery and involuntary servitude.

Thirteenth Amendment may also refer to:

- Thirteenth Amendment of the Constitution of India, established the Indian state of Nagaland
- Thirteenth Amendment of the Constitution of Ireland, which specified that the prohibition on abortion would not limit freedom of travel
- Thirteenth Amendment to the Constitution of Pakistan, which stripped the president of many of his reserve powers
- Thirteenth Amendment of the Constitution of South Africa, which re-enacted provisions of the Twelfth Amendment
- Thirteenth Amendment to the Constitution of Sri Lanka, which created Provincial Councils in Sri Lanka
