= VF-13 =

Fighter Squadron 13
- Active: 2 November 1943 – 20 October 1945
- Country: United States
- Branch: United States Navy
- Type: Fighter
- Nickname: Black Cats
- Engagements: World War II

Aircraft flown
- Fighter: F6F-3/5 Hellcat

Fighter Squadron 13 or VF-13 was an aviation unit of the United States Navy. Established on 2 November 1943, it was disestablished on 20 October 1945. It was the first US Navy squadron to be designated as VF-13.

== Operational history ==
VF-13 equipped with the F6F-5 Hellcat formed part of Carrier Air Group 13 (CVG-13) which was assigned to USS Franklin. In June 1944 the Franklin deployed to Pearl Harbor. On 24 October during the Battle of Leyte Gulf, CVG-13 participated in the sinking of the Japanese battleship Musashi. In early November 1944 following damage to Franklin in a Kamikaze attack, CVG-13 was temporarily landbased on Manus Island before re-embarking on Franklin as it proceeded to Puget Sound for repairs. In December 1944 CVG-13 was reforming at Naval Air Station Alameda, and then subsequently underwent training at Naval Air Station Fallon and Naval Air Station Livermore. In early August 1945 CVG-13 was assigned to USS Bunker Hill, but the war in the Pacific ended before they could deploy.

== See also ==
- History of the United States Navy
- List of inactive United States Navy aircraft squadrons
- List of United States Navy aircraft squadrons
