= 13th Cavalry Division (Russian Empire) =

- 13-я кавалерийская дивизия
- Active: 1914–1918
- Country: Russian Empire
- Branch: Russian Imperial Army
- Role: Cavalry
- Engagements: World War I; Battle of the Vistula River

The 13th Cavalry Division (Russian: 13-я кавалерийская дивизия, 13-ya Kavaleriiskaya Diviziya) was a cavalry formation of the Russian Imperial Army.

== Organization ==
- 1st Cavalry Brigade
  - 13th Regiment of Dragoons
  - 13th Uhlan Regiment
- 2nd Cavalry Brigade
  - 13th Regiment of Hussars
  - 13th Regiment of Cossacks
- 13th Horse Artillery Division

== Commanders (Division Chiefs) ==
- 1905: Evgeny Sykalov
- 1909: baron Nikolai von der Ropp

== Commanders of the 1st Brigade ==
- 1905: Alexei von Krusenstern
- 1909: Petr Myshetsky

== Commanders of the 2nd Brigade ==
- 1905: Petr Myshetsky
- 1908–1914: Gleb Vannovsky
