= 13th Indian Cavalry Brigade =

- Active: September 1918 –
- Country: British India
- Allegiance: British Crown
- Branch: British Indian Army
- Type: Cavalry
- Size: Brigade
- Part of: 4th (Quetta) Division
- Service: First World War

Commanders
- Notable commanders: Br.-Gen. G.A.H. Beatty

The 13th Indian Cavalry Brigade was a cavalry brigade of the British Indian Army that formed part of the Indian Army during the First World War. It remained in India throughout the war.

== History ==
The 13th Indian Cavalry Brigade (Note: Perry also names the brigade as 13th Mounted Brigade.) was formed under 4th (Quetta) Division in September 1918. It took command of three cavalry regiments, newly formed with squadrons from Egypt:

- 43rd Cavalry formed in August 1918 from
  - a squadron of 6th King Edward's Own Cavalry (Note: At this time, the parent regiment was serving in the Sinai and Palestine Campaign with the 12th Cavalry Brigade (British Indian Army).)
  - a squadron of 9th Hodson's Horse (Note: At this time, the parent regiment was serving in the Sinai and Palestine Campaign with the 13th Cavalry Brigade (British Indian Army).)
  - a squadron of 18th King George's Own Lancers
  - another squadron
- 44th Cavalry formed in August 1918 from
  - a squadron of 2nd Lancers (Gardner's Horse) (Note: At this time, the parent regiment was serving in the Sinai and Palestine Campaign with the 10th Cavalry Brigade (British Indian Army).)
  - a squadron of 19th Lancers (Fane's Horse)
  - a squadron of 29th Lancers (Deccan Horse) (Note: At this time, the parent regiment was serving in the Sinai and Palestine Campaign with the 11th Cavalry Brigade (British Indian Army).)
  - another squadron
- 45th Cavalry formed in August 1918 from
  - a squadron of 20th Deccan Horse (Note: At this time, the parent regiment was serving in the Sinai and Palestine Campaign with the 14th Cavalry Brigade (British Indian Army).)
  - a squadron of 34th Prince Albert Victor's Own Poona Horse
  - a squadron of 36th Jacob's Horse
  - a squadron of 38th King George's Own Central India Horse

The brigade remained with the division throughout the First World War. It was commanded from 1 September 1918 by Brigadier-General G.A.H. Beatty. All three constituent regiments were disbanded in 1919.

== See also ==
- 13th Cavalry Brigade (British Indian Army) existed at the same time but was unrelated other than having the same number

== Bibliography ==
- Gaylor, John (1996). Sons of John Company: The Indian and Pakistan Armies 1903–1991 (2nd ed.). Tunbridge Wells: Parapress. ISBN 1-898594-41-4.
- Perry, F.W. (1993). Order of Battle of Divisions Part 5B. Indian Army Divisions. Newport: Ray Westlake Military Books. ISBN 1-871167-23-X.
