= 13th Brigade =

13th Brigade or 13th Infantry Brigade may refer to:

== Australia ==
- 13th Brigade (Australia)

== Bulgaria ==
- 13th Tank Brigade (Bulgaria)

== British India ==
- 13th Cavalry Brigade (British Indian Army)
- 13th Indian Cavalry Brigade
- 13th Indian Infantry Brigade

== Canada ==
- 13th Canadian Infantry Brigade

== China ==
- 13th Armored Brigade (People's Republic of China)

== France ==
- 13th Demi-Brigade of the Foreign Legion

== Hungary ==
- 13th Infantry Brigade (Hungary)

== Italy ==
- 13th Infantry Regiment "Pinerolo"

== Japan ==
- 13th Brigade (Japan)

== Netherlands ==
- 13th Light Brigade (Netherlands)

== Russia/Soviet Union ==
- 13th Light Tank Brigade
- 13th Separate Air Assault Brigade

== South Korea ==
- 13th Special Mission Brigade (South Korea)

== Ukraine ==
- 13th Khartiia Brigade

== United Kingdom ==
- 13th Infantry Brigade (United Kingdom)
- 13th Mounted Brigade
- 13th (Highland) Pack Brigade, Royal Artillery
- 13th (Sussex Yeomanry) Army Brigade, Royal Field Artillery

== See also ==
- 13th Army (disambiguation)
- 13th Division (disambiguation)
- 13th Group (disambiguation)
- 13th Regiment (disambiguation)
- 13th Battalion (disambiguation)
- 13 Squadron (disambiguation)
