= 13th Panzergrenadier Division =

Coordinates: 51°22′48.64″N 12°21′03.93″E

- 13. Panzergrenadierdivision
- 13th Panzergrenadier Division insignia
- Active: September 26, 1990 – June 28, 2013
- Country: Germany
- Branch: German Army
- Type: Panzergrenadier
- Role: Conventional warfare, homeland defense
- Size: About 12,500 soldiers
- Part of: German Army
- Garrison/HQ: Leipzig
- Nicknames: The thirteenth Die Dreizehnte
- Engagements: Kosovo War; Macedonian Civil War; Afghanistan War: Kunduz Province Campaign

Commanders
- Notable commanders: Major General Achim Lidsba; Lieutenant General Roland Kather, former Allied Land Component Commander; Lieutenant General Bruno Kasdorf, serving twice as ISAF Chief of Staff

The 13th Panzergrenadier Division (13. Panzergrenadierdivision) was a mechanized division of the German Army. Its staff was based at Leipzig. The division was a unit of the German Army's stabilization forces and specialized on conflicts of low intensity and homeland defense. The division was Germany's permanent contribution to Multinational Corps North East.

== History ==
This division was formed in 1990 after German reunification and integrated troops of the former German Democratic Republic's National People's Army into the new unified military of Germany.

The division saw action in the Balkans during numerous deployments, including one deployment to Kosovo with division commander Lieutenant General Roland Kather serving as KFOR commanding officer. Troops of this division were also deployed to the support of civilian agencies during large natural disasters such as disastrous floods in 1997. In more recent times, the division has seen intense action against insurgents in northern Afghanistan.

A member of the 13th Panzergrenadier Division was awarded his nation's highest decoration for gallantry, the Honour Cross for Bravery on January 22, 2010. Master Sergeant Daniel Seibert led a heroic counterattack against a superior insurgent force in the village of Basoz in Afghanistan's Kunduz Province on June 4, 2009. His actions killed ten Taliban insurgents and saved a jeopardized reconnaissance squad from almost certain destruction.

The 13th Panzergrenadier Division was disbanded on June 28, 2013, as part of a restructuring of the German armed forces. The division's units had previously been transferred to 1st Panzer Division and the Airmobile Operations Division. 13th Panzergrenadier Division was succeeded by the Army Training Command (Ausbildungskommando Heer).

== Organisation ==
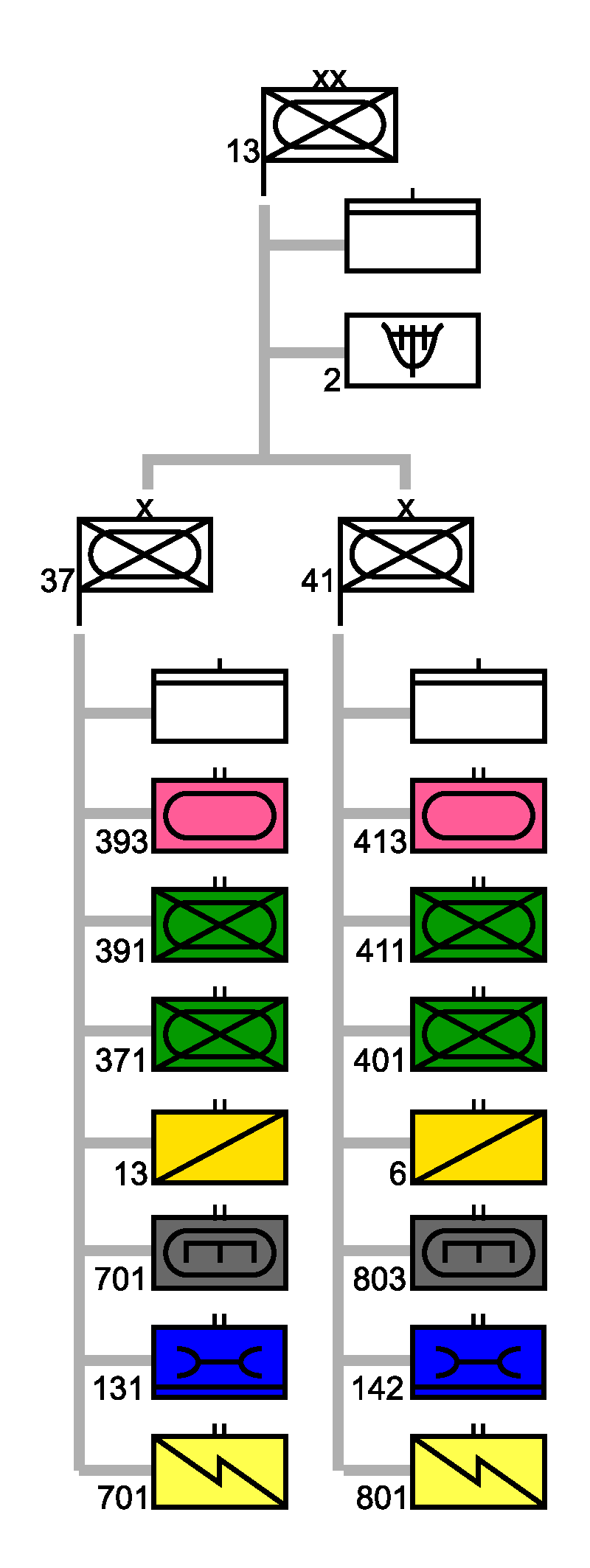
Organization of the 13th Mechanized Infantry Division (without reserve forces)

- 13th Panzergrenadier Division
  - Staff Company
  - Army Band 2
  - Signals Battalion 610
  - Mechanized Infantry Brigade 37 "Free State of Saxony"
    - Staff Company
    - Armoured Battalion 393
    - Mechanized Infantry Battalion 371
    - Mechanized Infantry Battalion 391
    - Mechanized Infantry Battalion 909 (reserve)
    - Reconnaissance Battalion 13
    - Reconnaissance Battalion 910 (reserve)
    - Armoured Engineer Battalion 701
    - Engineer Battalion 903 (reserve)
    - Signals Battalion 701
    - Logistics Battalion 131
  - Mechanized Infantry Brigade 41 "Hither Pomerania"
    - Staff Company
    - Armoured Battalion 413
    - Mechanized Infantry Battalion 401
    - Mechanized Infantry Battalion 411
    - Mechanized Infantry Battalion 908 (reserve)
    - Reconnaissance Battalion 6
    - Armoured Engineer Battalion 803
    - Engineer Battalion 901 (reserve)
    - Signals Battalion 801
    - Logistics Battalion 142

== See also ==
- Bundeswehr
- German Army
- Multinational Corps North East
