= Thirteenth Avenue =

Thirteenth Avenue, 13th Avenue or 13 Av may refer to:

- Thirteenth Avenue (Brooklyn), the commercial center of Borough Park, Brooklyn
- Thirteenth Avenue (Manhattan), a short street in the west side of Manhattan
- 13th Avenue (BMT Culver Line), a station on the former BMT Culver Line
- 13th Avenue station (RTD), a train station in Denver, Colorado
- 13 Av, the thirteenth day of Av, the fifth month of the Hebrew calendar
