= 13th Illinois Cavalry Regiment =

13th Regiment Illinois Volunteer Cavalry "German Guides"
- Illinois flag
- Active: October 30, 1861, to August 31, 1865
- Country: United States
- Allegiance: Union
- Branch: Cavalry

The 13th Regiment Illinois Volunteer Cavalry was a cavalry regiment that served in the Union Army during the American Civil War.

== Service ==
The original eight companies of the 13th Illinois Cavalry was mustered into service at Camp Douglas between October 30, 1861, and February 20, 1862. Surviving members of the regiment were consolidated into a battalion of three companies on May 20, 1863. Seven new companies were added to the regiment in February, 1864.

The regiment was mustered out on August 31, 1865.

== Total strength and casualties ==
The regiment suffered 21 enlisted men who were killed in action or who died of their wounds and 4 officers and 360 enlisted men who died of disease, for a total of 385 fatalities.

== Commanders ==
- Colonel Joseph W. Bell - mustered out May 20, 1863.
- Colonel Albert Erskine

== See also ==
- List of Illinois Civil War Units
- Illinois in the American Civil War
