= 13th Regiment =

13th Regiment or 13th Infantry Regiment may refer to:

- 13th Aviation Regiment, a unit of the United States Army
- 13th Parachute Dragoon Regiment, a unit of the French Special Forces
- Somerset Light Infantry (13th Regiment of Foot), a unit of the British Army
- 13th Infantry Regiment (Greece)
- 13th Infantry Regiment (Philippine Army), a unit of the Philippine Army
- 13th Cavalry Regiment (United States), a unit of the United States Army
- 13th Infantry Regiment (United States), a unit of the United States Army
- 13th Infantry Regiment (Imperial Japanese Army), a unit of the Imperial Japanese Army

American Revolutionary War regiments

- 13th Continental Regiment
- 13th Massachusetts Regiment
- 13th Pennsylvania Regiment
- 13th Virginia Regiment

American Civil War regiments

Union (Northern) Army

- 13th Illinois Volunteer Infantry Regiment
- 13th Iowa Volunteer Infantry Regiment
- 13th Maine Volunteer Infantry Regiment
- 13th Regiment Massachusetts Volunteer Infantry
- 13th Michigan Volunteer Infantry Regiment
- 13th Regiment Illinois Volunteer Cavalry
- 13th West Virginia Volunteer Infantry Regiment
- 13th Wisconsin Volunteer Infantry Regiment

== See also ==
- 13th Army (Soviet Union)
- 13th Division (disambiguation)
- 13th Brigade (disambiguation)
- 13th Group (disambiguation)
- 13th Battalion (disambiguation)
- 13 Squadron (disambiguation)
