= 13th Battalion =

13th Battalion may refer to:

- 13th Battalion (Australia), a unit of the Australian Army
- 13th Battalion (Royal Highlanders of Canada), CEF, a unit of the Canadian Army
- 13th "Shavnabada" Light Infantry Battalion, a unit of the Georgian Army
- 13th Airmobile Battalion (Ukraine), a unit of the Ukrainian Army
- 13th Psychological Operations Battalion, a unit of the United States Army
- Combat Logistics Battalion 13, a unit of the United States Marine Corps

== See also ==
- 13th Army (Soviet Union)
- 13th Division (disambiguation)
- 13th Brigade (disambiguation)
- 13th Regiment (disambiguation)
- 13th Squadron (disambiguation)
